= 2021 FA Cup final =

Association football championship match between Chelsea and Leicester City in 2021

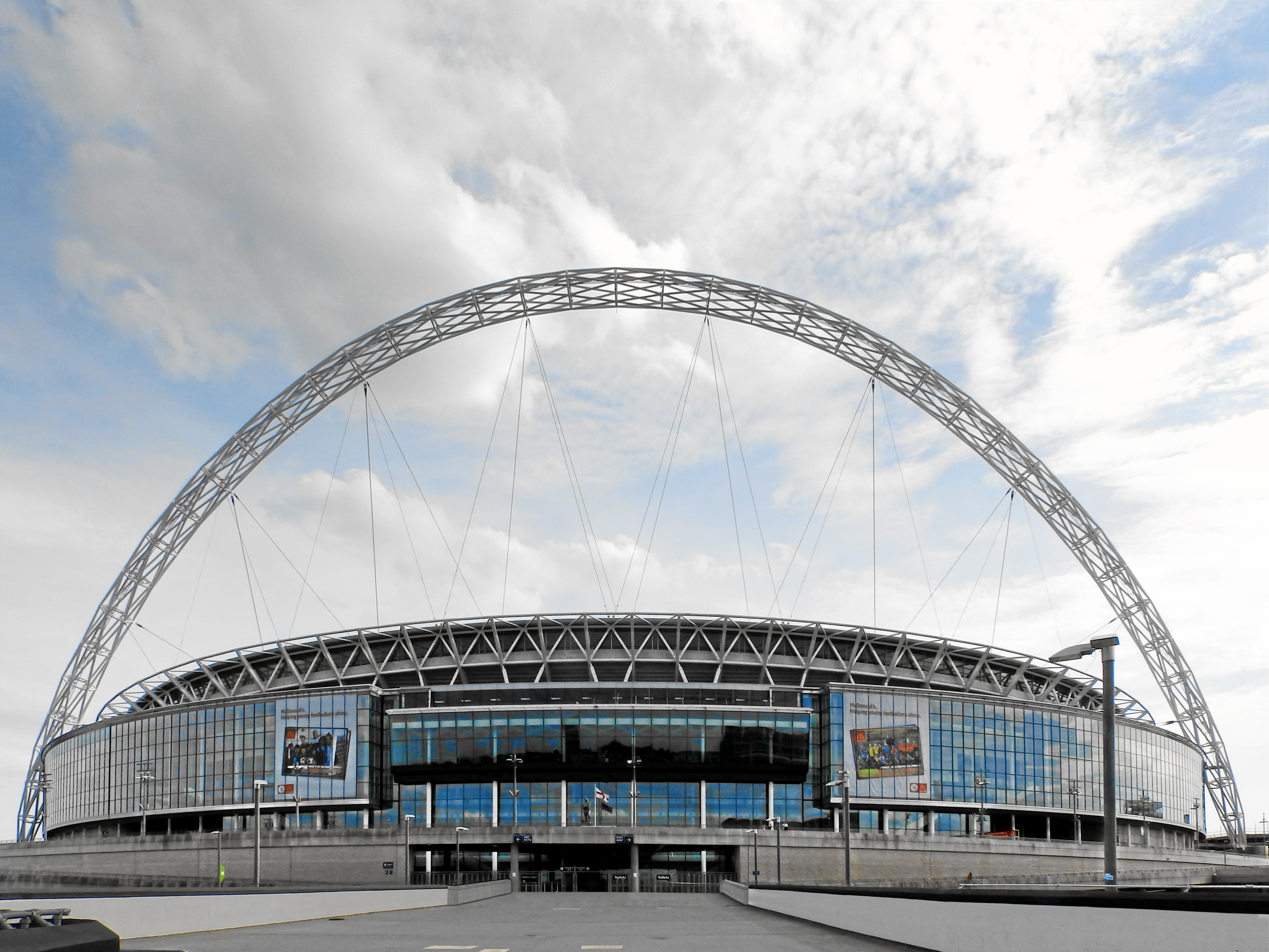
- The match took place at Wembley Stadium.
- Event: 2020–21 FA Cup
Chelsea	Leicester City
0	1
- Date: 15 May 2021
- Venue: Wembley Stadium, London
- Man of the Match: Youri Tielemans (Leicester City)
- Referee: Michael Oliver (County Durham)
- Attendance: 20,000 (Note: Attendance was capped at 20,000 due to the COVID-19 pandemic in the United Kingdom.)
- Weather: Rain

The 2021 FA Cup final was an association football match played between Chelsea and Leicester City at Wembley Stadium, London, England on 15 May 2021. Organised by the Football Association (FA), it was the 140th final of the Football Association Challenge Cup (FA Cup) and the showpiece match of English football's primary cup competition. The match was among the first football events where the return of large crowds was piloted after the COVID-19 pandemic in England, with an official attendance of 20,000 after the previous year's final was held behind closed doors. The match was televised live in the United Kingdom on free-to-air channel BBC One and on pay TV channel BT Sport 1. In the UK, live radio coverage was provided by BBC Radio 5 Live, Talksport and local stations BBC Radio London and BBC Radio Leicester. The match was watched by more than 9 million people in the United Kingdom.

Michael Oliver was the referee. After a goalless first half, Youri Tielemans scored midway through the second half with a strike from distance which flew into the top-left corner of Chelsea's goal past Kepa Arrizabalaga. In the final minute of regular time, Thiago Silva passed to Ben Chilwell, who shot; Çağlar Söyüncü cleared Chilwell's shot off the line but it deflected back off Wes Morgan and into the Leicester City net. The goal was referred to the video assistant referee, who deemed Chilwell was offside in the build-up; the goal was disallowed and the match ended 1–0 to Leicester City who won the first FA Cup title in their history. Tielemans was named as man of the match. As winners, Leicester City entered the group stage of the 2021–22 UEFA Europa League. They also faced 2020–21 Premier League champions Manchester City in the 2021 FA Community Shield.

== Route to the final ==
=== Chelsea ===
Chelsea's route to the final
Round	Opposition	Score
3rd	Morecambe (H)	4–0
4th	Luton Town (H)	3–1
5th	Barnsley (A)	1–0
QF	Sheffield United (H)	2–0
SF	Manchester City (N)	1–0
Key: (H) = Home venue; (A) = Away venue; (N) = Neutral venue

As a Premier League team, Chelsea entered the competition in the third round where they played at home at Stamford Bridge against League Two side Morecambe, whom had been affected by a COVID-19 outbreak at the club prior to the match. Mason Mount opened the scoring in the 18th minute with a 25-yard (23 m) strike before Timo Werner made it 2–0 to Chelsea before half-time from close range. Callum Hudson-Odoi scored four minutes after the interval and Kai Havertz made it 4–0 after heading in a cross from César Azpilicueta. In the fourth round, they played Championship side Luton Town at home. Chelsea were 2–0 ahead inside 17 minutes with two goals from Tammy Abraham. Jordan Clark reduced the deficit, scoring after an error from Kepa Arrizabalaga, but Abraham completed his hat-trick in the 74th minute. Werner missed a late penalty and the match ended 3–1 to Chelsea.

Their opposition for the fifth round was Championship team Barnsley who they played away at Oakwell. After a goalless first half, Abraham gave Chelsea the lead midway through the second, with his side's only shot on target in the match. A late shot from Michael Sollbauer was cleared off the goalline by Abraham, and Chelsea progressed to the quarter-final with a 1–0 victory. There they played fellow Premier League side Sheffield United at Stamford Bridge. Midway through the first half, Chelsea took the lead when Oliver Norwood deflected Ben Chilwell's cross into the Sheffield United net for an own goal. In second-half stoppage time, Chelsea counter-attacked as Sheffield United pushed players up the field, and Hakim Ziyech's 92nd minute strike secured a 2–0 win. Chelsea then faced the Premier League leaders Manchester City in the semi-final at Wembley Stadium which was being used as a neutral venue. The first half ended goalless and ten minutes into the second half, Ziyech scored from Werner's pass. No further goals were scored and Chelsea reached their fourth final in five years with a 1–0 victory.

=== Leicester City ===
Leicester City's route to the final
Round	Opposition	Score
3rd	Stoke City (A)	4–0
4th	Brentford (A)	3–1
5th	Brighton & Hove Albion (H)	1–0
QF	Manchester United (H)	3–1
SF	Southampton (N)	1–0
Key: (H) = Home venue; (A) = Away venue; (N) = Neutral venue

As a Premier League team, Leicester City started in the third round, playing Championship team Stoke City away at the Bet365 Stadium. The home side's Sam Vokes struck his shot over the crossbar before James Justin opened the scoring for Leicester in the 34th minute. Marc Albrighton doubled the lead fourteen minutes into the second half before strikes from Ayoze Pérez and Harvey Barnes secured a 4–0 victory. In the fourth round, they played Championship side Brentford at the Brentford Community Stadium. Mads Bech Sørensen put the home side ahead after seven minutes to give them a 1–0 half-time lead. Within a minute of the restart, Cengiz Ünder scored from a James Maddison pass to level the score. Youri Tielemans was then fouled in the Brentford penalty area and scored the resulting penalty to make it 2–1 to Leicester City. Maddison then scored from a rebound after Brentford's goalkeeper Luke Daniels failed to hold on to Barnes' shot, to give Leicester City a 3–1 win.

Leicester's fifth round home match was at home at the King Power Stadium against fellow Premier League team Brighton & Hove Albion. After a goalless first half, both Ünder and Brighton's Andi Zeqiri had goals disallowed before Kelechi Iheanacho headed in a Tielemans cross four minutes into second-half stoppage time to give his side a 1–0 victory. Leicester played fellow Premier League side Manchester United at home in the quarter-final. Iheanacho capitalised on a poor backpass by Fred to score past Dean Henderson in the 24th minute. Mason Greenwood equalised for Manchester United seven minutes before half time but Tielemans restored Leicester's one-goal lead with a low shot in the 52nd minute. Iheanacho scored his second and Leicester's third twelve minutes before the end of the match to secure a 3–1 win. Wembley Stadium hosted the semi-final as a neutral venue where Leicester City faced Southampton, another Premier League team, in front of 4,000 spectators as part of a pilot scheme with coronavirus restrictions easing. No goals were scored in the first half but Iheanacho's 55th minute strike secured a 1–0 win for Leicester City and qualification for their first FA Cup final since 1969.

== Background ==
This was Chelsea's fifteenth FA Cup Final appearance and their fourth in the last five seasons, having missed out in 2019. However, they won only one of those four, beating Manchester United 1–0 in 2018. They had lost 2020's final to Arsenal. Chelsea had won eight finals, seven of those occurred since 1997. Leicester City appeared in four FA Cup Finals prior to 2021, losing them all; their most recent appearance was in 1969, when they were defeated 1–0 by Manchester City. In the clubs' 118 previous meetings, Chelsea won 57, Leicester City won 27 and the remaining 34 were drawn. Leicester City had never beaten Chelsea in their seven previous FA Cup ties, although two had gone to a replay. Their most recent meeting was in the 2020–21 Premier League on 19 January 2021 where Leicester won 2–0 with goals from Wilfred Ndidi and Maddison. This was the first FA Cup Final since 2013 held before the Premier League season ended. With two league games remaining, Leicester were in third place, two points ahead of Chelsea in fourth. Leicester went into the final as the only prior league champions of England not to have won the FA Cup. This was also the first cup final Leicester participated in since the 2000 Football League Cup Final.

Michael Oliver (Durham) was the referee, assisted by Stuart Burt and Simon Bennett. Stuart Attwell was the fourth official, and Dan Cook the reserve assistant referee. Chris Kavanagh was the video assistant referee (VAR) and Sian Massey-Ellis, acting as assistant VAR, became the first female referee involved in an FA Cup final.

For their team selections, Chelsea dropped Abraham and brought in Ziyech. Leicester started Jonny Evans and had their captain Wes Morgan on the bench.

== Pre-match ==
=== Ticketing and attendance ===
Due to the COVID-19 pandemic in the United Kingdom, crowds at football matches in England had not exceeded 8,000 since March 2020. The Football Association planned for the FA Cup Final to be part of a pilot scheme to allow fans to attend. The English Football League had delayed the 2021 EFL Cup Final, hoping to admit supporters under the same scheme.

On 14 March 2021, it was announced that up to 20,000 fans would be able to attend the final after it was selected for the pilot. This also came as Wembley was due to host several matches, including the final, of UEFA Euro 2020 in the summer. Initial government plans required fans to provide evidence of their COVID vaccine status. Following opposition, the government announced fans would not need vaccine passports but would still have to provide evidence of a recent negative COVID-19 lateral flow test in order to enter the stadium. After the event fans were requested to take a PCR test to track whether the event caused any spread of COVID-19.

=== Broadcasting ===
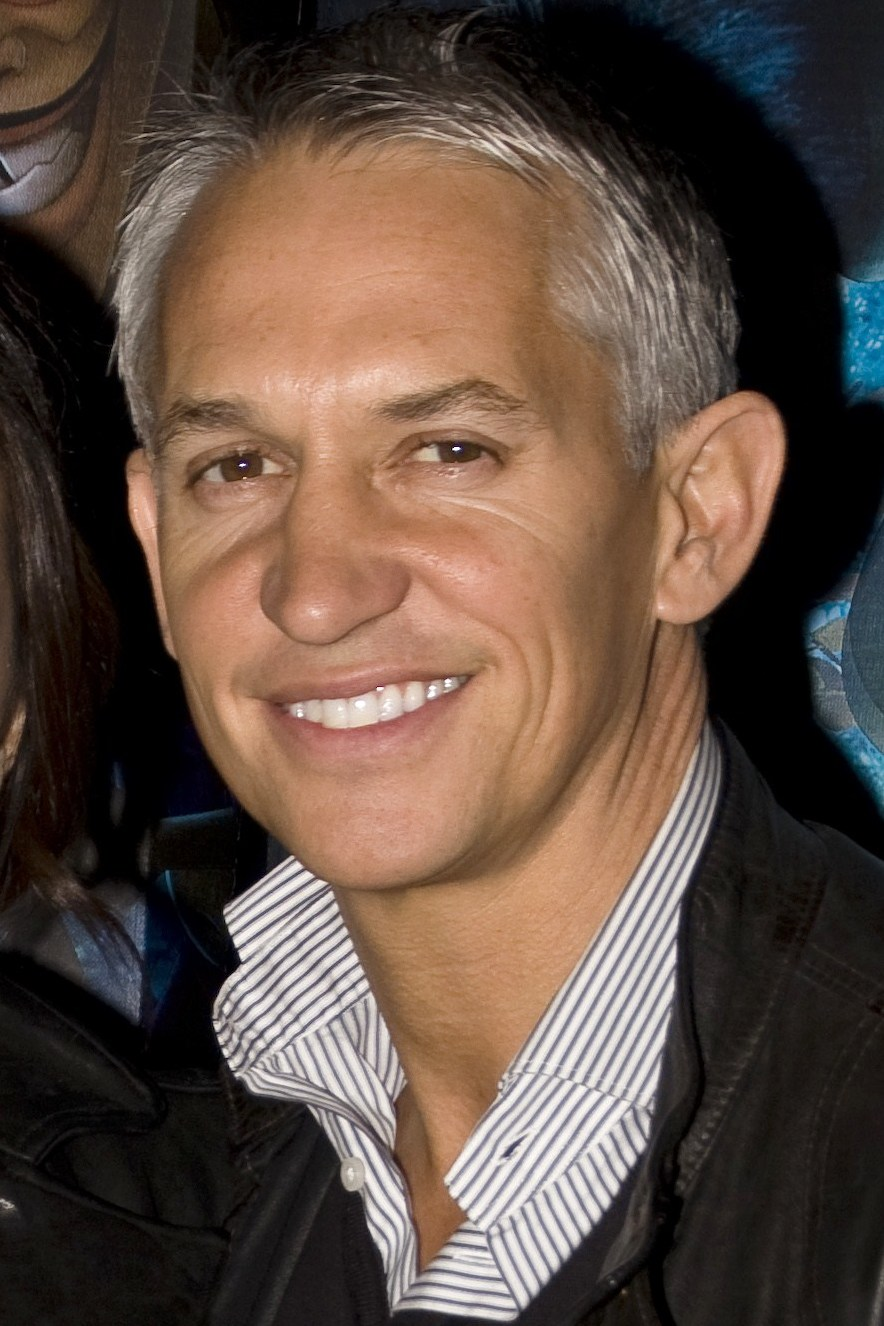
Former Leicester City player Gary Lineker (pictured in 2010) presented the BBC One coverage of the final.

The match was televised live in the United Kingdom on BBC One and BT Sport 1. BBC One's coverage was presented by former Leicester City player Gary Lineker alongside former Newcastle United forward Alan Shearer, former Arsenal forward and two-time FA Cup winner Ian Wright, and former Chelsea defender Ashley Cole, with commentary from Guy Mowbray and former Tottenham Hotspur midfielder Jermaine Jenas. BBC coverage of the final was watched by 9.1 million people in the United Kingdom, making it the most watched match of the season. BBC Sport presenter Dan Walker presented the preview to the final on Football Focus with former Aston Villa player Dion Dublin and former Arsenal Women's player Alex Scott. BT Sport's broadcast was presented by Jake Humphrey, former Chelsea midfielder Joe Cole, former Leicester City forward Emile Heskey, and former players Rio Ferdinand and Michael Owen. Ian Darke was BT's main commentator, joined by former Leicester midfielder Robbie Savage and former Chelsea player-manager Glenn Hoddle. Former referee Peter Walton provided commentary on the match officiating. Under the terms of the broadcasting deal they struck with the FA in 2013, it was the last time BT Sport showed the FA Cup final, having lost the rights for the 2021–2025 broadcasting cycle to ITV in 2019.

Talksport's coverage was presented by Mark Saggers; Sam Matterface and Andy Townsend provided commentary. BBC Radio also covered the match nationally on BBC Radio 5 Live, whose commentary team comprised John Murray and Dion Dublin, and on the local stations for the two clubs, BBC Radio London and BBC Radio Leicester.

=== Opening ceremony ===
British singer-songwriter Becky Hill sang the national anthem "God Save the Queen" alongside the B Positive Choir and the Band of the Coldstream Guards. The B Positive Choir also sang "Abide with Me", the traditional FA Cup Final hymn. Prince William, Duke of Cambridge, led the presentation party of FA interim chairman Peter McCormick, Emirates' UK divisional vice president Richard Jewsbury and chairman of the FA Cup Challenge Committee Steve Curwood. The coin toss featured a commemorative coin with a red poppy, marking the Royal British Legion's centenary. Players from both teams dropped to one knee immediately prior to kick-off, in support of the No Room For Racism campaign; this was booed by some sections of the crowd.

== Match ==
=== Summary ===
==== First half ====
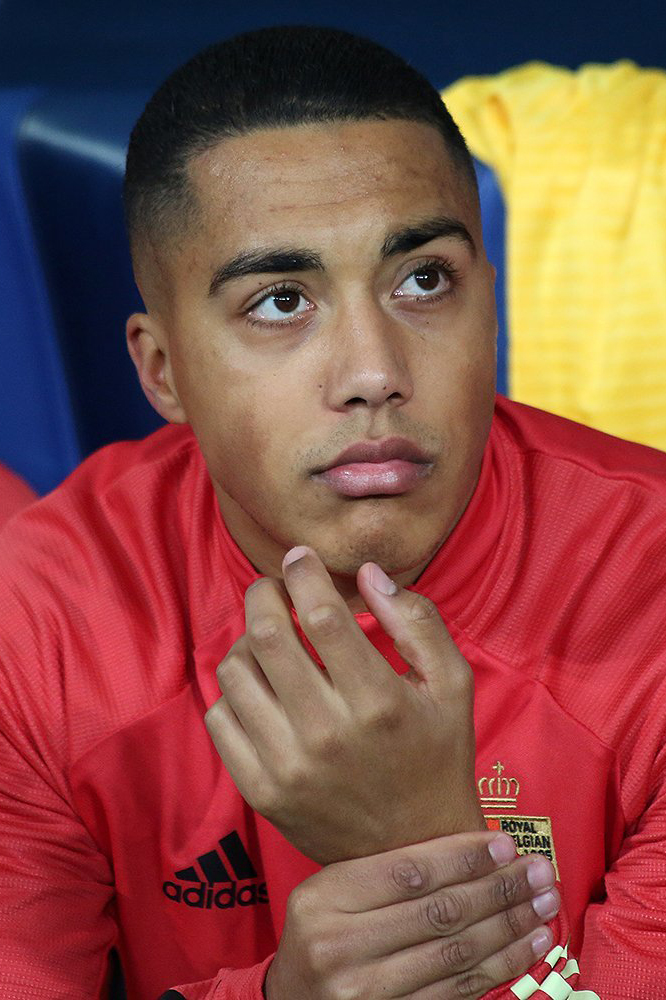
Youri Tielemans (pictured in 2019) scored the only goal of the game.

Leicester City kicked off the match around 5:15 p.m. in front of an official attendance of 20,000. Chelsea started the match the dominant side but Antonio Rüdiger's 15th minute shot from 30 yards (27 m) went wide of Leicester City's goal. Timothy Castagne then sent in a low cross which Jamie Vardy struck towards the Chelsea goal but the ball was blocked by Reece James. In the 20th minute, Thiago Silva was adjudged to have handled the ball after Leicester City's Iheanacho tried to get past him. Tielemans' resulting free kick was headed over the Chelsea crossbar by Çağlar Söyüncü from around 6 yards (5.5 m). Midway through the first half, rain began to heavily fall.

Marcos Alonso had a scoring opportunity cleared by Tielemans before Mount's strike from the edge of Leicester City's penalty area took a deflection from Wesley Fofana, going just wide of Leicester City's goal. Werner then struck high over the crossbar from distance before both he and Azpilicueta missed a cross from Mount. Evans became the match's first substituted player when he picked up an injury in the 34th minute and was replaced by Albrighton. A minute later, Fofana was shown the game's first yellow card after fouling Werner; Werner was booked minutes later after a lunging slide on Fofana. With three minutes of the half remaining, Pérez was brought down by Jorginho and Söyüncü headed Tielemans' resulting free kick wide from 12 yards (11 m). Werner had a shot deflected out for a corner by Fofana. Vardy's stoppage time header from that corner went wide of the Chelsea goal. The half ended 0–0 with neither team registering a shot on target.

==== Second half ====
No substitutions were made during the interval. Chelsea kicked off the second half. Eight minutes in, after Leicester City had dominated, Chelsea's N'Golo Kanté delivered a cross, but Leicester City goalkeeper Kasper Schmeichel easily caught Alonso's weak header. Schmeichel then saved Azpilicueta's shot. In the 63rd minute, Luke Thomas passed to Tielemans whose strike from distance flew into the top-left corner of Chelsea's goal, giving Leicester City a 1–0 lead. Despite claims from Chelsea that there had been a handball during the build-up, the goal stood. Chelsea's Ziyech then shot but his strike was deflected out for a corner which came to nothing. Midway through the second half, Iheanacho was replaced by Maddison before Chelsea made a double-substitution, with Ziyech and Alonso coming off for Christian Pulisic and Chilwell. With 19 minutes remaining, Mount went down after being tackled by Söyüncü but Chelsea's claims for a penalty were denied by the referee.

Azpilicueta was then substituted in the 75th minute after a clash of heads. Jorginho was also substituted at the same time, with Havertz and Hudson-Odoi replacing them. Kanté's 78th minute cross was headed goalbound by Chilwell but Schmeichel saved the attempt. With eight minutes of regular time remaining, Chelsea replaced Werner with Giroud; Leicester City's Thomas and Pérez were substituted for Hamza Choudhury and Morgan. A minute later, Rudiger's shot was high over Leicester City's crossbar before Mount's rising shot was pushed out for a corner by Schmeichel. In the final minute of regular time, Silva passed to Chilwell, who shot; Söyüncü cleared Chilwell's shot off the line but it deflected back off Chilwell and into the Leicester City net. The goal was referred to the VAR, who deemed Chilwell was offside in the build-up and the goal was disallowed. Five minutes of stoppage time were played but there were no more goals. The match ended 1–0 to Leicester City, who won the FA Cup for the first time. Tielemans was named man of the match.

=== Details ===
15 May 2021
17:15 BST

Chelsea	0–1	Leicester City
	Report	Tielemans 63'

Wembley Stadium, London
Attendance: 20,000
Referee: Michael Oliver (County Durham)

Chelsea	Leicester City

GK	1	Kepa Arrizabalaga (ESP)
CB	28	César Azpilicueta (ESP) (c)		(substituted off) 76'
CB	6	Thiago Silva (BRA)
CB	2	Antonio Rüdiger (GER)
RM	24	Reece James (ENG)
CM	7	N'Golo Kanté (FRA)
CM	5	Jorginho (ITA)		(substituted off) 75'
LM	3	Marcos Alonso (ESP)		(substituted off) 68'
AM	22	Hakim Ziyech (MAR)		(substituted off) 68'
AM	19	Mason Mount (ENG)
CF	11	Timo Werner (GER)	(yellow card) 40'	(substituted off) 82'
Substitutes:
GK	16	Édouard Mendy (SEN)
DF	15	Kurt Zouma (FRA)
DF	21	Ben Chilwell (ENG)		(substituted on) 68'
DF	33	Emerson (ITA)
MF	10	Christian Pulisic (USA)		(substituted on) 68'
MF	20	Callum Hudson-Odoi (ENG)		(substituted on) 76'
MF	23	Billy Gilmour (SCO)
MF	29	Kai Havertz (GER)		(substituted on) 75'
FW	18	Olivier Giroud (FRA)		(substituted on) 82'
Manager:
Thomas Tuchel (GER)

GK	1	Kasper Schmeichel (DEN) (c)
CB	3	Wesley Fofana (FRA)	(yellow card) 36'
CB	6	Jonny Evans (NIR)		(substituted off) 34'
CB	4	Çağlar Söyüncü (TUR)
RM	27	Timothy Castagne (BEL)
CM	8	Youri Tielemans (BEL)
CM	25	Wilfred Ndidi (NGA)
LM	33	Luke Thomas (ENG)		(substituted off) 82'
AM	17	Ayoze Pérez (ESP)		(substituted off) 82'
CF	14	Kelechi Iheanacho (NGA)		(substituted off) 67'
CF	9	Jamie Vardy (ENG)
Substitutes:
GK	12	Danny Ward (WAL)
DF	5	Wes Morgan (JAM)		(substituted on) 82'
DF	18	Daniel Amartey (GHA)
DF	21	Ricardo Pereira (POR)
MF	10	James Maddison (ENG)		(substituted on) 67'
MF	11	Marc Albrighton (ENG)		(substituted on) 34'
MF	20	Hamza Choudhury (BAN)		(substituted on) 82'
MF	24	Nampalys Mendy (SEN)
MF	26	Dennis Praet (BEL)
Manager:
Brendan Rodgers (NIR)

Man of the Match:
Youri Tielemans (Leicester City)

Assistant referees:
Stuart Burt (Northamptonshire)
Simon Bennett (Staffordshire)
Fourth official:
Stuart Attwell (Birmingham)
Reserve assistant referee:
Dan Cook (Hampshire)
Video assistant referee:
Chris Kavanagh (Manchester)
Assistant video assistant referee:
Sian Massey-Ellis (Birmingham)

Match rules

- 90 minutes
- 30 minutes of extra time if necessary
- Penalty shoot-out if scores still level
- Nine named substitutes
- Maximum of five substitutions, with a sixth allowed in extra time (Note: Each team was given only three opportunities to make substitutions, with a fourth opportunity in extra time, excluding substitutions made at half-time, before the start of extra time and at half-time in extra time.)

== Post-match ==
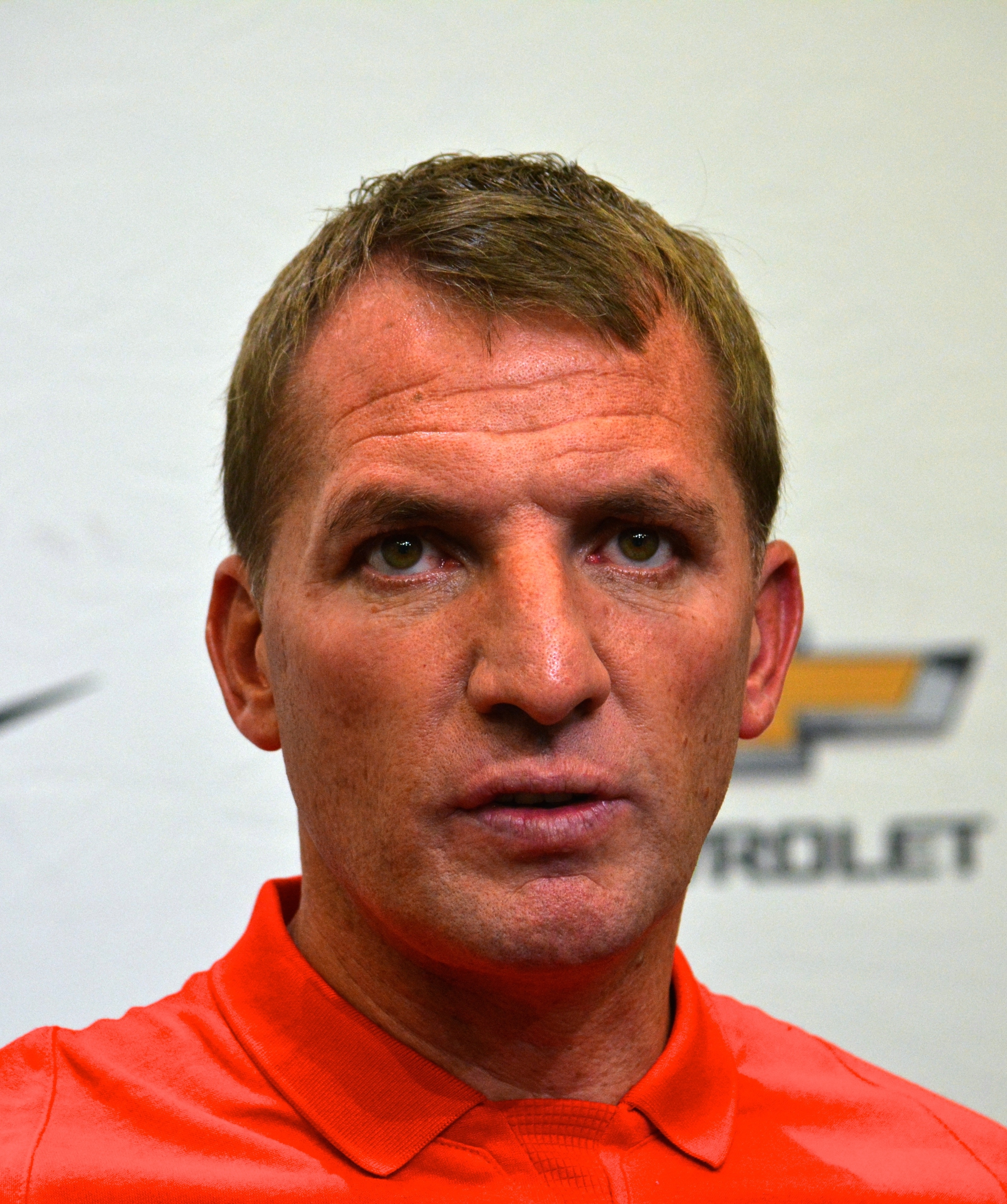
Brendan Rodgers (pictured in 2014) won his seventh final as a manager.

As President of The Football Association, Prince William, Duke of Cambridge, presented the FA Cup to Schmeichel, Leicester City's captain. Due to the COVID-19 pandemic in England, the presentation took place on the pitch instead of in the Royal Box. Players and managers of both clubs picked up their own medals. The FA did not punish Leicester players Choudhury and Fofana for parading the flag of Palestine during the post-match celebrations. This was despite it being claimed that such an action was against The FA's rules on political statements.

The Leicester City manager Brendan Rodgers paid tribute to his side and the supporters: "I'm very proud, it's a historic day for the club. Winning the FA Cup for the first time is clearly a special day. The players were so courageous in the game ... It was a fantastic atmosphere and I'm so happy Leicester supporters could be there to see us win it." He described Tielemans' strike as "an old-school FA Cup-winning goal" but highlighted his goalkeeper's influence on the game, saying " ... Kasper Schmeichel's saves – those are the special moments you need in games." It was Rodgers' seventh final win in seven attempts as a manager. Schmeichel himself was jubilant: "To think of the people who have lifted this trophy, and to be able to do it today is beyond my wildest dreams." Thomas Tuchel, the Chelsea manager, suggested that his team were "simply unlucky" and suggested that VAR had missed a handball in the build-up to the winning goal. He also described Tielemans' goal as "fantastic ... but lucky".

Tielemans' goal was lauded in the media: the BBC described it as a "stunner", Miguel Delaney of The Independent said that it was "one of the most spectacular FA Cup winners this competition will ever see", while David Hytner of The Observer called the goal a "firecracker" and one that "will live forever". It was declared "a remarkable goal, a thunderous strike" by CBS Sports and "a moment of magic" by Ali Humayun in The Athletic.

As winners, Leicester City earned £1.8 million in prize money, while runners-up Chelsea earned £900,000. Leicester City also qualified for the 2021–22 UEFA Europa League group stage. Furthermore, Leicester qualified for the 2021 FA Community Shield, where they beat 2020–21 Premier League champions Manchester City 1–0. Chelsea became the first team since Newcastle United in 1998 and 1999 to lose two consecutive FA Cup finals.
