= 2017–18 Leicester City F.C. season =

113th season in existence of Leicester City

Leicester City
2017–18 season
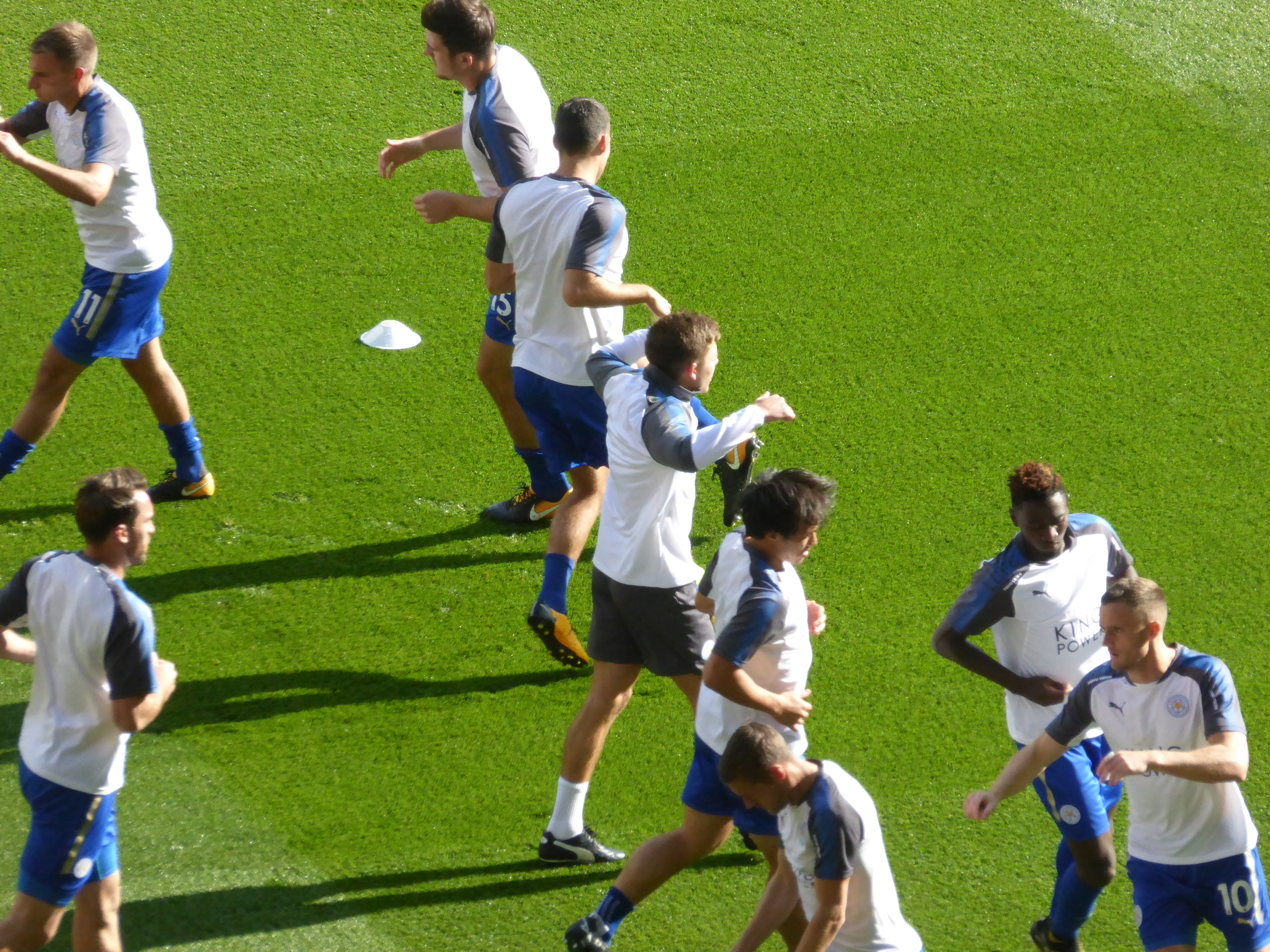
- Leicester City players warming up before a Premier League match Manchester United in August 2017
- Owner: King Power
- Chairman: Vichai Srivaddhanaprabha
- Manager: Craig Shakespeare (Until 17 October); Claude Puel (From 25 October)
- Stadium: King Power Stadium
- Premier League: 9th
- FA Cup: Quarter-finals
- EFL Cup: Quarter-finals
- Top goalscorer: League: Jamie Vardy (20); All: Jamie Vardy (23)
| Home colours | Away colours | Third colours |

The 2017–18 Leicester City season was the club's 113th season in the English football league system and its 50th (non-consecutive) season in the top tier of English football. This season saw Leicester City participate in the Premier League for the fourth consecutive season as well as the FA Cup and EFL Cup. The season covered the period from 1 July 2017 to 30 June 2018.

== Transfers ==
=== Transfers in ===
| Date | Position | Nationality | Name | From | Fee | Ref. |
|---|---|---|---|---|---|---|
| 1 July 2017 | CB | (England) | Sam Hughes | (England) Chester | Free | |
| 1 July 2017 | CB | (England) | Harry Maguire | (England) Hull City | £17,000,000 | |
| 6 July 2017 | DM | (Spain) | Vicente Iborra | (Spain) Sevilla | £15,000,000 | |
| 19 July 2017 | GK | (Switzerland) | Eldin Jakupović | (England) Hull City | Undisclosed | |
| 3 August 2017 | CF | (Nigeria) | Kelechi Iheanacho | (England) Manchester City | £25,000,000 | |
| 8 August 2017 | RW | (Wales) | George Thomas | (England) Coventry City | Undisclosed | |
| 1 January 2018 | CM | (Portugal) | Adrien Silva | (Portugal) Sporting CP | £22,000,000 | |
| 9 January 2018 | CF | (Mali) | Fousseni Diabaté | (France) Gazélec Ajaccio | £2,000,000 | |

=== Transfers out ===
| Date | Position | Nationality | Name | To | Fee | Ref. |
|---|---|---|---|---|---|---|
| 30 June 2017 | CB | (Poland) | Marcin Wasilewski | (Poland) Wisła Kraków | Released | |
| 30 June 2017 | CM | (England) | Michael Cain | (England) Whitehawk | Released | |
| 30 June 2017 | CB | (Austria) | David Domej | (Germany) 1. FC Nürnberg II | Released | |
| 30 June 2017 | LM | (England) | Brandon Fox | (England) Tamworth | Released | |
| 30 June 2017 | CB | (France) | Cédric Kipré | (Scotland) Motherwell | Released | |
| 30 June 2017 | DM | (England) | Matty Miles | (England) Eynesbury Rovers | Released | |
| 30 June 2017 | CF | (Grenada) | Kairo Mitchell | (England) Nuneaton Town | Released | |
| 12 July 2017 | GK | (Germany) | Ron-Robert Zieler | (Germany) VfB Stuttgart | Undisclosed | |
| 15 August 2017 | SS | (Wales) | Tom Lawrence | (England) Derby County | Undisclosed | |
| 31 August 2017 | CM | (England) | Danny Drinkwater | (England) Chelsea | £35,000,000 | |

=== Loans in ===
| Start date | Position | Nationality | Name | From | End date | Ref. |
|---|---|---|---|---|---|---|
| 31 August 2017 | CB | (Austria) | Aleksandar Dragović | (Germany) Bayer Leverkusen | 30 June 2018 | |

=== Loans out ===
| Start date | Position | Nationality | Name | To | End date | Ref. |
|---|---|---|---|---|---|---|
| 14 July 2017 | AM | (Poland) | Bartosz Kapustka | (Germany) SC Freiburg | 30 June 2018 | |
| 31 July 2017 | LB | (Australia) | Callum Elder | (England) Wigan Athletic | 30 June 2018 | |
| 11 August 2017 | LW | (England) | Harvey Barnes | (England) Barnsley | 30 June 2018 | |
| 18 August 2017 | CB | (England) | Elliott Moore | (Belgium) Oud-Heverlee Leuven | January 2018 | |
| 31 August 2017 | DM | (France) | Nampalys Mendy | (France) Nice | 30 June 2018 | |
| 29 January 2018 | CF | (Argentina) | Leonardo Ulloa | (England) Brighton & Hove Albion | 30 June 2018 | |
| 30 January 2018 | CF | (Nigeria) | Ahmed Musa | (Russia) CSKA Moscow | 30 June 2018 | |
| 31 January 2018 | CM | (Wales) | Andy King | (Wales) Swansea City | 30 June 2018 | |
| 31 January 2018 | CF | (Algeria) | Islam Slimani | (England) Newcastle United | 30 June 2018 | |

== Players and staff ==
=== First team squad ===
- This section lists players who were in Leicester's first team squad at any point during the 2016–17 season
- Asterisks indicates player left mid-season
- Hash symbol indicates player retired mid-season
- Italics indicate loan player

| No. | Nationality | Name | Position | Joined | Signed from |
Goalkeepers
| 1 | (Denmark) | Kasper Schmeichel | GK | 2011 | (England) Leeds United |
| 12 | (England) | Ben Hamer | GK | 2014 | (England) Charlton Athletic |
| 17 | (Switzerland) | Eldin Jakupović | GK | 2017 | (England) Hull City |
Defenders
| 2 | (England) | Danny Simpson | RB | 2014 | (England) Queens Park Rangers |
| 3 | (England) | Ben Chilwell | LB / LM | 2015 | Youth |
| 5 | (Jamaica) | Wes Morgan | CB | 2012 (winter) | (England) Nottingham Forest |
| 6 | (Germany) | Robert Huth | CB | 2015 | (England) Stoke City |
| 15 | (England) | Harry Maguire | CB | 2017 | (England) Hull City |
| 16 | (Austria) | Aleksandar Dragović | CB | 2017 | (Germany) Bayer Leverkusen (loan) |
| 28 | (Austria) | Christian Fuchs | LB / CB | 2015 | (Germany) Schalke 04 |
| 29 | (Tunisia) | Yohan Benalouane | CB | 2015 | (Italy) Atalanta |
| 31 | (Australia) | Callum Elder | LB | 2013 | Youth |
| 33 | (England) | Elliott Moore | CB | 2016 | Youth |
Midfielders
| 7 | (England) | Demarai Gray | LW / RW / CF | 2016 (winter) | (England) Birmingham City |
| 11 | (England) | Marc Albrighton | RM / LM | 2014 | (England) Aston Villa |
| 14 | (Portugal) | Adrien Silva | CM | 2017 | (Portugal) Sporting CP |
| 18 | (Ghana) | Daniel Amartey | CM / CB / RB / DM | 2016 (winter) | (Denmark) Copenhagen |
| 21 | (Spain) | Vicente Iborra | DM | 2017 | (Spain) Sevilla |
| 22 | (England) | Matty James | CM | 2012 | (England) Manchester United |
| 25 | (Nigeria) | Wilfred Ndidi | DM | 2017 (winter) | (Belgium) Genk |
| 26 | (Algeria) | Riyad Mahrez | LW / RW / AM | 2014 (winter) | (France) Le Havre |
| 32 | (England) | Harvey Barnes | AM / CM / RM / LM | 2016 | Youth |
Forwards
| 8 | (Nigeria) | Kelechi Iheanacho | CF | 2017 | (England) Manchester City |
| 9 | (England) | Jamie Vardy | CF | 2012 | (England) Fleetwood Town |
| 20 | (Japan) | Shinji Okazaki | CF / AM | 2015 | (Germany) Mainz 05 |
| 30 | (Wales) | George Thomas | RW / LW / CF | 2017 | (England) Coventry City |
| 33 | (Mali) | Fousseni Diabaté | RW / LW / CF | 2018 | (France) Gazélec Ajaccio |

== Pre-season ==
=== Premier League Asia Trophy ===
| 19 July 2017 Semi-final | Leicester City | 1–1 (7–6 p) | West Bromwich Albion | So Kon Po, Hong Kong |
| 18:00 HKT | Mahrez 24' | Report | Rodriguez 10' | Stadium: Hong Kong Stadium; Attendance: 40,000; Referee: Paul Tierney (England) |
| | Penalties |
| | Ulloa (penalty scored); Vardy (penalty scored); Fuchs (penalty scored); Drinkwater (penalty scored); Iborra (penalty scored); King (penalty scored); Albrighton (penalty scored) | | (penalty scored) Chadli; (penalty scored) Robson-Kanu; (penalty scored) Evans; (penalty scored) Dawson; (penalty scored) McClean; (penalty scored) Leko; (penalty missed) Field |

| 22 July 2017 Final | Liverpool | 2–1 | Leicester City | So Kon Po, Hong Kong |
| 20:30 HKT | Salah 20'; Coutinho 44' | Report | Slimani 12'; Mahrez (yellow card) 43'; Ndidi (yellow card) 73' | Stadium: Hong Kong Stadium; Attendance: 39,498; Referee: Bobby Madley (England) |

=== Pre-season friendlies ===
Leicester City announced five pre-season friendlies against Burton Albion, Luton Town, Wolverhampton Wanderers, Milton Keynes Dons and Borussia Mönchengladbach.

| 26 July 2017 | Luton Town | 0–1 | Leicester City | Luton |
| 19:45 BST | | Report | Mahrez 83' | Stadium: Kenilworth Road; Attendance: 4,237; Referee: Darren Deadman |

| 28 July 2017 | Milton Keynes Dons | 0–0 | Leicester City | Milton Keynes |
| 19:45 BST | | Report | | Stadium: StadiumMK; Attendance: 7,561; Referee: Darren Deadman |

| 29 July 2017 | Wolverhampton Wanderers | 1–0 | Leicester City | Wolverhampton |
| 15:00 BST | Cavaleiro 59' | Report | Maguire (yellow card) 66' | Stadium: Molineux; Attendance: 11,953; Referee: Stephen Martin |

| 1 August 2017 | Burton Albion | 2–1 | Leicester City | Burton upon Trent |
| 19:45 BST | Akpan 17'; Akins 29' | Report | Maguire 66' | Stadium: Pirelli Stadium; Referee: Simon Hooper |

| 4 August 2017 | Leicester City | 2–1 | Borussia Mönchengladbach | Leicester |
| 19:45 BST | Vardy 67', 74' | Report | Hazard 46' | Stadium: King Power Stadium; Attendance: 12,385; Referee: Andre Marriner |

== Competitions ==
=== Overview ===
| Competition | First match | Last match | Starting round | Final position | Record | | | | | | | |
| Competition | First match | Last match | Starting round | Final position | Pld | W | D | L | GF | GA | GD | Win % |
|---|---|---|---|---|---|---|---|---|---|---|---|---|
| Premier League | 11 August 2017 | 13 May 2018 | Matchday 1 | 9th | 38 | 12 | 11 | 15 | 56 | 60 | −4 | 31.58 |
| FA Cup | 6 January 2018 | 18 March 2018 | Third round | Quarter-finals | 5 | 3 | 1 | 1 | 9 | 3 | +6 | 60.00 |
| EFL Cup | 22 August 2017 | 19 December 2017 | Second round | Quarter-finals | 4 | 3 | 1 | 0 | 10 | 3 | +7 | 75.00 |
| Total | | | | | 47 | 18 | 13 | 16 | 75 | 66 | +9 | 38.30 |

Last updated: 13 May 2018
Source: Soccerway

=== Premier League ===
==== League table ====
| Pos | Team | Pld | W | D | L | GF | GA | GD | Pts | Qualification or relegation |
|---|---|---|---|---|---|---|---|---|---|---|
| 7 | Burnley | 38 | 14 | 12 | 12 | 36 | 39 | −3 | 54 | Qualification for the Europa League second qualifying round (Note: Since the winners of the 2017–18 FA Cup (Chelsea) and the winners of the 2017–18 EFL Cup (Manchester City) both qualified for European competition based on their league positions, the berths awarded to the 5th-placed team (Europa League group stage) and the League Cup winners (Europa League second qualifying round) were passed down the league.) |
| 8 | Everton | 38 | 13 | 10 | 15 | 44 | 58 | −14 | 49 | |
| 9 | Leicester City | 38 | 12 | 11 | 15 | 56 | 60 | −4 | 47 | |
| 10 | Newcastle United | 38 | 12 | 8 | 18 | 39 | 47 | −8 | 44 | |
| 11 | Crystal Palace | 38 | 11 | 11 | 16 | 45 | 55 | −10 | 44 | |

Source: Premier League
Rules for classification: 1) Points; 2) Goal difference; 3) Goals scored. 4) Play-offs (only if needed to decide champion, teams for relegation or teams for UEFA competitions).

==== Result summary ====
| Overall | | | | | | | | Home | | | | | | Away | | | | | |
| Pld | W | D | L | GF | GA | GD | Pts | W | D | L | GF | GA | GD | W | D | L | GF | GA | GD |
|---|---|---|---|---|---|---|---|---|---|---|---|---|---|---|---|---|---|---|---|
| 38 | 12 | 11 | 15 | 56 | 60 | −4 | 47 | 7 | 6 | 6 | 25 | 22 | +3 | 5 | 5 | 9 | 31 | 38 | −7 |

Last updated: 13 May 2018.
Source: Premier League

==== Results by matchday ====
| Matchday | 1 | 2 | 3 | 4 | 5 | 6 | 7 | 8 | 9 | 10 | 11 | 12 | 13 | 14 | 15 | 16 | 17 | 18 | 19 | 20 | 21 | 22 | 23 | 24 | 25 | 26 | 27 | 28 | 29 | 30 | 31 | 32 | 33 | 34 | 35 | 36 | 37 | 38 |
|---|---|---|---|---|---|---|---|---|---|---|---|---|---|---|---|---|---|---|---|---|---|---|---|---|---|---|---|---|---|---|---|---|---|---|---|---|---|---|
| Ground | A | H | A | H | A | H | A | H | A | H | A | H | A | H | H | A | A | H | H | A | A | H | A | H | A | H | A | H | H | A | A | H | A | H | A | H | H | A |
| Result | L | W | L | L | D | L | D | D | W | W | D | L | D | W | W | W | W | L | D | L | L | W | D | W | L | D | L | D | D | W | W | L | L | D | L | L | W | L |
| Position | 13 | 9 | 15 | 17 | 15 | 16 | 17 | 18 | 14 | 11 | 12 | 12 | 12 | 9 | 9 | 8 | 8 | 8 | 8 | 8 | 8 | 8 | 8 | 7 | 8 | 8 | 8 | 8 | 8 | 8 | 8 | 8 | 8 | 8 | 9 | 9 | 9 | 9 |

Updated to match(es) played on 13 May 2018. Source: 11v11
A = Away; H = Home; W = Win; D = Draw; L = Loss

==== Matches ====
On 14 June 2017, the 2017–18 season fixtures were announced. Leicester City played in the first Premier League fixture that opened the season on Friday.

| 11 August 2017 1 | Arsenal | 4–3 | Leicester City | Holloway, London |
| 19:45 BST | Lacazette 2'; Welbeck 45+2'; Ramsey 83'; Giroud 85' | Report | Okazaki 5'; Vardy 29', 56'; Morgan (yellow card) 90+4' | Stadium: Emirates Stadium; Attendance: 59,387; Referee: Mike Dean |

| 19 August 2017 2 | Leicester City | 2–0 | Brighton & Hove Albion | Leicester |
| 15:00 BST | Okazaki 1'; Morgan (yellow card) 50'; Maguire 54' | Report | | Stadium: King Power Stadium; Attendance: 31,902; Referee: Lee Probert |

| 26 August 2017 3 | Manchester United | 2–0 | Leicester City | Old Trafford |
| 17:30 BST | Lukaku (penalty missed) 53'; Mkhitaryan (yellow card) 54'; Rashford 70'; Fellaini 82' | Report | James (yellow card) 89'; Schmeichel (yellow card) 90+5' | Stadium: Old Trafford; Attendance: 75,021; Referee: Michael Oliver |

| 9 September 2017 4 | Leicester City | 1–2 | Chelsea | Leicester |
| 15:00 BST | Vardy 62' (pen.); Ndidi (yellow card) 84' | Report | Morata 41'; Kanté 50' | Stadium: King Power Stadium; Attendance: 30,923; Referee: Lee Mason |

| 16 September 2017 5 | Huddersfield Town | 1–1 | Leicester City | Huddersfield |
| 15:00 BST | Schindler (yellow card) 40'; Depoitre 46' | Report | Vardy 50' (pen.); Okazaki (yellow card) 80' | Stadium: Kirklees Stadium; Attendance: 24,129; Referee: Jon Moss |

| 23 September 2017 6 | Leicester City | 2–3 | Liverpool | Leicester |
| 17:30 BST | Albrighton (yellow card) 17'; Ndidi (yellow card) 22'; Okazaki 45+3'; Vardy 69', (yellow card) 90+2' | Report | Salah 15'; Coutinho 23'; Matip (yellow card) 45+2'; Lovren (yellow card) 56'; Henderson 68'; Mignolet (yellow card) 72' | Stadium: King Power Stadium; Attendance: 32,004; Referee: Anthony Taylor |

| 30 September 2017 7 | Bournemouth | 0–0 | Leicester City | Bournemouth |
| 15:00 BST | Pugh (yellow card) 20' | Report | | Stadium: Dean Court; Attendance: 10,444; Referee: Graham Scott |

| 16 October 2017 8 | Leicester City | 1–1 | West Bromwich Albion | Leicester |
| 20:00 BST | Iheanacho (yellow card) 62'; Albrighton (yellow card) 68'; Mahrez 80' | Report | Hegazi (yellow card) 8'; Myhill (yellow card) 47'; Chadli 63' | Stadium: King Power Stadium; Attendance: 30,203; Referee: Mike Dean |

| 21 October 2017 9 | Swansea City | 1–2 | Leicester City | Swansea |
| 15:00 BST | Mawson 56' | Report | Fernández 24' (o.g.); Okazaki 49' | Stadium: Liberty Stadium; Attendance: 20,521; Referee: Michael Oliver |

| 29 October 2017 10 | Leicester City | 2–0 | Everton | Leicester |
| 16:00 GMT | Vardy 18'; Gray 29' | Report | Davies (yellow card) 20'; Gueye (yellow card) 65' | Stadium: King Power Stadium; Attendance: 31,891; Referee: Andre Marriner |

| 4 November 2017 11 | Stoke City | 2–2 | Leicester City | Stoke-on-Trent |
| 12:30 GMT | Shaqiri 39'; Crouch 73' | Report | Iborra 33'; Mahrez 60' | Stadium: Bet365 Stadium; Attendance: 29,602; Referee: Bobby Madley |

| 18 November 2017 12 | Leicester City | 0–2 | Manchester City | Leicester |
| 15:00 GMT | Maguire (yellow card) 83' | Report | Kompany (yellow card) 3'; Jesus 45'; De Bruyne 49' | Stadium: King Power Stadium; Attendance: 31,908; Referee: Graham Scott |

| 24 November 2017 13 | West Ham United | 1–1 | Leicester City | Stratford, London |
| 20:00 GMT | Kouyaté 45'; Ayew (yellow card) 79' | Report | Albrighton 8'; Gray (yellow card) 79' | Stadium: London Stadium; Attendance: 56,897; Referee: Martin Atkinson |

| 28 November 2017 14 | Leicester City | 2–1 | Tottenham Hotspur | Leicester |
| 19:45 GMT | Vardy 13'; Mahrez 45+1'; Schmeichel (yellow card) 90+5' | Report | Vertonghen (yellow card) 20'; Kane 79'; Lamela (yellow card) 89' | Stadium: King Power Stadium; Attendance: 31,950; Referee: Anthony Taylor |

| 2 December 2017 15 | Leicester City | 1–0 | Burnley | Leicester |
| 15:00 GMT | Gray 6' | Report | Bardsley (yellow card) 56'; Mee (yellow card) 90+1' | Stadium: King Power Stadium; Attendance: 30,714; Referee: Paul Tierney |

| 9 December 2017 16 | Newcastle United | 2–3 | Leicester City | Newcastle upon Tyne |
| 17:30 GMT | Joselu 4'; Gayle 73'; Hayden (yellow card) 75'; Lejeune (yellow card) 81' | Report | Gray (yellow card) 12', (goal) 60'; Mahrez 20'; Pérez 86' (o.g.) | Stadium: St James' Park; Attendance: 52,117; Referee: Neil Swarbrick |

| 13 December 2017 17 | Southampton | 1–4 | Leicester City | Southampton |
| 19:45 GMT | Austin (yellow card) 52'; Yoshida 61' | Report | Mahrez 11'; Okazaki 31', 69'; King 38' | Stadium: St Mary's Stadium; Attendance: 27,714; Referee: Chris Kavanagh |

| 16 December 2017 18 | Leicester City | 0–3 | Crystal Palace | Leicester |
| 12:30 GMT | Ndidi (yellow card) 52' (yellow-red card) 61'; Maguire (yellow card) 56'; Simpson (yellow card) 86' | Report | Benteke 19', (yellow card) 50'; Zaha 40'; Schlupp (yellow card) 68'; Sako 90+4' | Stadium: King Power Stadium; Attendance: 31,081; Referee: Martin Atkinson |

| 23 December 2017 19 | Leicester City | 2–2 | Manchester United | Leicester |
| 19:45 GMT | Vardy 27'; Albrighton (yellow card) 54'; Amartey (yellow card) 69' (yellow-red card) 73'; Mahrez (yellow card) 81'; Maguire 90+4' | Report | Lindelöf (yellow card) 34'; Mata 40', 60'; Matić (yellow card) 47' | Stadium: King Power Stadium; Attendance: 32,202; Referee: Jonathan Moss |

| 26 December 2017 20 | Watford | 2–1 | Leicester City | Watford |
| 15:00 GMT | Watson (yellow card) 8'; Kabasele (yellow card) 13'; Wagué 45'; Schmeichel 65' (o.g.); Zeegelaar (yellow card) 88' | Report | Maguire (yellow card) 4'; Dragović (yellow card) 30'; Mahrez 37'; King (yellow card) 81' | Stadium: Vicarage Road; Attendance: 20,308; Referee: Chris Kavanagh |

| 30 December 2017 21 | Liverpool | 2–1 | Leicester City | Liverpool |
| 15:00 GMT | Milner (yellow card) 8'; Salah 52', 76'; Can (yellow card) 53'; Robertson (yellow card) 90+1' | Report | Vardy 3'; Maguire (yellow card) 53'; Ndidi (yellow card) 62' | Stadium: Anfield; Attendance: 53,226; Referee: Neil Swarbrick |

| 1 January 2018 22 | Leicester City | 3–0 | Huddersfield Town | Leicester |
| 15:00 GMT | Morgan (yellow card) 24'; Mahrez 53'; Slimani 60'; Albrighton 90+2' | Report | Malone (yellow card) 84' | Stadium: King Power Stadium; Attendance: 31,748; Referee: Graham Scott |

| 13 January 2018 23 | Chelsea | 0–0 | Leicester City | Fulham |
| 15:00 GMT | Kanté (yellow card) 56'; Morata (yellow card) 87' | Report | James (yellow card) 18'; Okazaki (yellow card) 61'; Chilwell (yellow card) 63' (yellow-red card) 68' | Stadium: Stamford Bridge; Attendance: 41,552; Referee: Mike Jones |

| 20 January 2018 24 | Leicester City | 2–0 | Watford | Leicester |
| 15:00 GMT | Vardy 39' (pen.); Mahrez 90+1' | Report | | Stadium: King Power Stadium; Attendance: 31,891; Referee: Lee Probert |

| 31 January 2018 25 | Everton | 2–1 | Leicester City | Liverpool |
| 19:45 GMT | Walcott 25', 39' | Report | Vardy 71' (pen.); Albrighton (yellow card) 90'; Ndidi (yellow card) 90+1' | Stadium: Goodison Park; Attendance: 38,390; Referee: Chris Kavanagh |

| 3 February 2018 26 | Leicester City | 1–1 | Swansea City | Leicester |
| 15:00 GMT | Diabaté (yellow card) 3'; Vardy 17' | Report | Fernández 53' | Stadium: King Power Stadium; Attendance: 31,179; Referee: Anthony Taylor |

| 10 February 2018 27 | Manchester City | 5–1 | Leicester City | Manchester |
| 17:30 GMT | Sterling 3'; Agüero 48', 53', 77', 90'; Gündoğan (yellow card) 73'; Laporte (yellow card) 83' | Report | Vardy 24', (yellow card) 83'; Ndidi (yellow card) 71'; Maguire (yellow card) 89' | Stadium: City of Manchester Stadium; Attendance: 54,416; Referee: Mike Jones |

| 24 February 2018 28 | Leicester City | 1–1 | Stoke City | Leicester |
| 12:30 GMT | Albrighton (yellow card) 18'; Butland 70' (o.g.) | Report | Allen (yellow card) 9'; Diouf (yellow card) 23'; Shaqiri 43'; Adam (yellow card) 83' | Stadium: King Power Stadium; Attendance: 31,769; Referee: Michael Oliver |

| 3 March 2018 29 | Leicester City | 1–1 | Bournemouth | Leicester |
| 15:00 GMT | Silva (yellow card) 50'; Schmeichel (yellow card) 90+4'; Mahrez 90+7' | Report | King 35' (pen.); Gosling (yellow card) 64' | Stadium: King Power Stadium; Attendance: 31,384; Referee: Lee Probert |

| 10 March 2018 30 | West Bromwich Albion | 1–4 | Leicester City | West Bromwich |
| 15:00 GMT | Rondón 8'; Livermore (yellow card) 80' | Report | Vardy 21', (yellow card) 41'; Simpson (yellow card) 53'; Mahrez 62'; Ndidi (yellow card) 73'; Iheanacho 76'; Iborra 90+3' | Stadium: The Hawthorns; Attendance: 23,558; Referee: Bobby Madley |

| 31 March 2018 31 | Brighton & Hove Albion | 0–2 | Leicester City | Falmer |
| 15:00 BST | Kayal (yellow card) 66'; Bong (yellow card) 79' | Report | Morgan (yellow card) 12'; Ndidi (yellow card) 24' (yellow-red card) 87'; Chilwell (yellow card) 63'; Simpson (yellow card) 64'; Maguire (yellow card) 68'; Iborra 83'; Vardy 90+6' | Stadium: Falmer Stadium; Attendance: 30,629; Referee: Chris Kavanagh |

| 7 April 2018 32 | Leicester City | 1–2 | Newcastle United | Leicester |
| 15:00 BST | Maguire (yellow card) 21'; Vardy 83' | Report | Shelvey 18'; Lascelles (yellow card) 21'; Gayle (yellow card) 52'; Ritchie (yellow card) 55'; Pérez 75' | Stadium: King Power Stadium; Attendance: 32,066; Referee: Stuart Attwell |

| 14 April 2018 33 | Burnley | 2–1 | Leicester City | Burnley |
| 15:00 BST | Wood 6'; Long 9'; Lennon (yellow card) 65'; Barnes (yellow card) 81' | Report | Vardy 72'; Iheanacho (yellow card) 87' | Stadium: Turf Moor; Attendance: 21,727; Referee: Martin Atkinson |

| 19 April 2018 34 | Leicester City | 0–0 | Southampton | Leicester |
| 19:45 BST | | Report | | Stadium: King Power Stadium; Attendance: 31,160; Referee: Roger East |

| 28 April 2018 35 | Crystal Palace | 5–0 | Leicester City | Selhurst |
| 15:00 BST | Zaha 17'; McArthur 38'; Cabaye (yellow card) 53'; Loftus-Cheek 81'; Van Aanholt 84'; Benteke 90' (pen.) | Report | Albrighton (red card) 56'; Silva (yellow card) 77' | Stadium: Selhurst Park; Attendance: 25,750; Referee: Mike Dean |

| 5 May 2018 36 | Leicester City | 0–2 | West Ham United | Leicester |
| 15:00 BST | Dragović (yellow card) 64' | Report | João Mário 34'; Arnautović (yellow card) 41'; Cresswell (yellow card) 49'; Noble 64' | Stadium: King Power Stadium; Attendance: 32,013; Referee: Chris Kavanagh |

| 9 May 2018 37 | Leicester City | 3–1 | Arsenal | Leicester |
| 19:45 BST | Iheanacho 14'; Vardy 76' (pen.); Simpson (yellow card) 78'; Mahrez (yellow card) 85', (goal) 90' | Report | Mavropanos (red card) 15'; Aubameyang 53'; Holding (yellow card) 75'; Xhaka (yellow card) 77' | Stadium: King Power Stadium; Attendance: 32,095; Referee: Graham Scott |

| 13 May 2018 38 | Tottenham Hotspur | 5–4 | Leicester City | Wembley |
| 15:00 BST | Kane 7', 76'; Lamela 49', 60'; Fuchs 53' (o.g.); Wanyama (yellow card) 55' | Report | Vardy 4', 73'; Mahrez 16'; Iheanacho 47'; Choudhury (yellow card) 83'; Silva (yellow card) 90' | Stadium: Wembley Stadium; Attendance: 77,841; Referee: Craig Pawson |

=== FA Cup ===
In the FA Cup, Leicester City entered the competition in the third round and were drawn away to Fleetwood Town.

| 6 January 2018 Third round | Fleetwood Town | 0–0 | Leicester City | Fleetwood |
| 12:45 GMT | | Report | | Stadium: Highbury Stadium; Attendance: 5,001; Referee: Simon Hooper |

| 16 January 2018 Third round replay | Leicester City | 2–0 | Fleetwood Town | Leicester |
| 19:45 GMT | Iheanacho (yellow card) 17', (goal) 43', 77'; Benalouane (yellow card) 35' | Report | Glendon (yellow card) 45'; Dempsey (yellow card) 71' | Stadium: King Power Stadium; Attendance: 17,237; Referee: Jonathan Moss |

| 27 January 2018 Fourth round | Peterborough United | 1–5 | Leicester City | Peterborough |
| 12:30 GMT | Hughes 58' | Report | Diabaté 9', 87'; Iheanacho 12', 29'; Iborra (yellow card) 14'; Ndidi 90+2' | Stadium: London Road; Attendance: 13,193; Referee: Michael Oliver |

| 16 February 2018 Fifth round | Leicester City | 1–0 | Sheffield United | Leicester |
| 19:45 GMT | Vardy 66' | Report | | Stadium: King Power Stadium; Attendance: 28,336; Referee: Lee Mason |

| 18 March 2018 Quarter-finals | Leicester City | 1–2 (a.e.t.) | Chelsea | Leicester |
| 16:30 GMT | Maguire (yellow card) 25'; Vardy 76' | Report | Morata 42'; Bakayoko (yellow card) 45+1'; Moses (yellow card) 89'; Pedro 105' | Stadium: King Power Stadium; Attendance: 31,792; Referee: Craig Pawson |

=== EFL Cup ===
Leicester City entered in the second round of the competition with an away trip to Sheffield United. A home tie against Liverpool was confirmed for the third round. Another home tie was drawn for the fourth round with Leeds United the visitors. A third consecutive home tie in the competition was announced for the quarter-finals, against Manchester City.

| 22 August 2017 Second round | Sheffield United | 1–4 | Leicester City | Sheffield |
| 19:45 BST | Lafferty (yellow card) 4'; Lundstram (yellow card) 52'; Lavery 84' | Report | Musa (yellow card) 20', (goal) 90+4'; Slimani (yellow card) 24', (goal) 63', 67'; Gray 52' | Stadium: Bramall Lane; Attendance: 11,280; Referee: Tony Harrington |

| 19 September 2017 Third round | Leicester City | 2–0 | Liverpool | Leicester |
| 19:45 BST | Okazaki 65'; Slimani 78'; Iborra (yellow card) 90' | Report | Grujić (yellow card) 57'; Klavan (yellow card) 75' | Stadium: King Power Stadium; Attendance: 31,609; Referee: Stuart Attwell |

| 24 October 2017 Fourth round | Leicester City | 3–1 | Leeds United | Leicester |
| 19:45 BST | Iheanacho 30'; Slimani 70'; Mahrez 88' | Report | Hernández 26' | Stadium: King Power Stadium; Attendance: 31,516; Referee: Lee Probert |

| 19 December 2017 Quarter-finals | Leicester City | 1–1 (a.e.t.) (3–4 p) | Manchester City | Leicester |
| 19:45 GMT | Iheanacho (yellow card) 23'; Vardy 90+7' (pen.); Maguire (yellow card) 105' | Report | B. Silva 26'; Gündoğan (yellow card) 61'; Danilo (yellow card) 90+6'; Walker (yellow card) 96' | Stadium: King Power Stadium; Attendance: 31,562; Referee: Bobby Madley |
| | Penalties |
| | Fuchs (penalty scored); Maguire (penalty scored); Iborra (penalty scored); Vardy (penalty missed); Mahrez (penalty missed) | | (penalty scored) Gündoğan; (penalty scored) Touré; (penalty scored) Nmecha; (penalty scored) Jesus |

== Squad statistics ==
=== Appearances ===
| No. | Pos | Nat | Player | Total | | Premier League | | FA Cup | | League Cup | |
| No. | Pos | Nat | Player | Apps | Goals | Apps | Goals | Apps | Goals | Apps | Goals |
|---|---|---|---|---|---|---|---|---|---|---|---|
| 1 | GK | (Denmark) | Kasper Schmeichel | 35 | 0 | 33 | 0 | 2 | 0 | 0 | 0 |
| 2 | DF | (England) | Danny Simpson | 31 | 0 | 27+1 | 0 | 3 | 0 | 0 | 0 |
| 3 | DF | (England) | Ben Chilwell | 32 | 0 | 20+4 | 0 | 3+1 | 0 | 4 | 0 |
| 5 | DF | (Jamaica) | Wes Morgan | 35 | 0 | 32 | 0 | 2 | 0 | 1 | 0 |
| 6 | DF | (Germany) | Robert Huth | 0 | 0 | 0 | 0 | 0 | 0 | 0 | 0 |
| 7 | MF | (England) | Demarai Gray | 44 | 4 | 17+18 | 3 | 4+1 | 0 | 3+1 | 1 |
| 8 | FW | (Nigeria) | Kelechi Iheanacho | 28 | 8 | 7+14 | 3 | 4+1 | 4 | 2 | 1 |
| 9 | FW | (England) | Jamie Vardy | 42 | 23 | 37 | 20 | 2+1 | 2 | 0+2 | 1 |
| 11 | MF | (England) | Marc Albrighton | 42 | 2 | 30+4 | 2 | 1+4 | 0 | 3 | 0 |
| 12 | GK | (England) | Ben Hamer | 9 | 0 | 3+1 | 0 | 1 | 0 | 4 | 0 |
| 14 | MF | (Portugal) | Adrien Silva | 16 | 0 | 9+3 | 0 | 3+1 | 0 | 0 | 0 |
| 15 | DF | (England) | Harry Maguire | 44 | 2 | 38 | 2 | 3 | 0 | 3 | 0 |
| 16 | DF | (Austria) | Aleksandar Dragović | 16 | 0 | 7+4 | 0 | 2 | 0 | 3 | 0 |
| 17 | GK | (Switzerland) | Eldin Jakupovic | 4 | 0 | 2 | 0 | 2 | 0 | 0 | 0 |
| 18 | MF | (Ghana) | Daniel Amartey | 14 | 0 | 6+2 | 0 | 2 | 0 | 4 | 0 |
| 20 | FW | (Japan) | Shinji Okazaki | 32 | 7 | 17+10 | 6 | 0+3 | 0 | 1+1 | 1 |
| 21 | MF | (Spain) | Vicente Iborra | 26 | 3 | 17+2 | 3 | 4 | 0 | 3 | 0 |
| 22 | MF | (England) | Matty James | 15 | 0 | 11+2 | 0 | 1+1 | 0 | 0 | 0 |
| 25 | MF | (Nigeria) | Wilfred Ndidi | 38 | 1 | 33 | 0 | 2+1 | 1 | 2 | 0 |
| 26 | MF | (Algeria) | Riyad Mahrez | 41 | 13 | 34+2 | 12 | 3 | 0 | 0+2 | 1 |
| 28 | DF | (Austria) | Christian Fuchs | 29 | 0 | 21+4 | 0 | 2 | 0 | 2 | 0 |
| 29 | DF | (Tunisia) | Yohan Benalouane | 6 | 0 | 1 | 0 | 3 | 0 | 0+2 | 0 |
| 30 | FW | (Wales) | George Thomas | 0 | 0 | 0 | 0 | 0 | 0 | 0 | 0 |
| 32 | MF | (England) | Harvey Barnes | 5 | 0 | 0+3 | 0 | 2 | 0 | 0 | 0 |
| 33 | MF | (Mali) | Fousseni Diabaté | 16 | 2 | 5+9 | 0 | 1+1 | 2 | 0 | 0 |
| 34 | DF | (England) | Josh Knight | 1 | 0 | 0 | 0 | 0 | 0 | 0+1 | 0 |
| 37 | MF | (England) | Layton Ndukwu | 0 | 0 | 0 | 0 | 0 | 0 | 0 | 0 |
| 38 | MF | (England) | Hamza Choudhury | 9 | 0 | 4+4 | 0 | 0 | 0 | 0+1 | 0 |
| 45 | DF | (England) | Sam Hughes | 0 | 0 | 0 | 0 | 0 | 0 | 0 | 0 |
Players who left during the season
| 10 | MF | (Wales) | Andy King (on loan at Swansea City) | 15 | 1 | 5+6 | 1 | 1 | 0 | 3 | 0 |
| 13 | FW | (Nigeria) | Ahmed Musa (on loan at CSKA Moscow) | 1 | 1 | 0 | 0 | 0 | 0 | 1 | 1 |
| 19 | FW | (Algeria) | Islam Slimani (on loan at Newcastle United) | 17 | 5 | 2+10 | 1 | 2 | 0 | 3 | 4 |
| 23 | FW | (Argentina) | Leonardo Ulloa (on loan at Brighton & Hove Albion) | 6 | 0 | 0+4 | 0 | 0 | 0 | 2 | 0 |
| 24 | MF | (France) | Nampalys Mendy (on loan at Nice) | 1 | 0 | 0 | 0 | 0 | 0 | 0+1 | 0 |

=== Top scorers ===
| Rnk | No | Pos | Nat | Name | Premier League | FA Cup | League Cup | Total |
|---|---|---|---|---|---|---|---|---|
| 1 | 9 | FW | (England) | Jamie Vardy | 20 | 2 | 1 | 23 |
| 2 | 26 | MF | (Algeria) | Riyad Mahrez | 12 | 0 | 1 | 13 |
| 3 | 8 | FW | (Nigeria) | Kelechi Iheanacho | 3 | 4 | 1 | 8 |
| 4 | 20 | FW | (Japan) | Shinji Okazaki | 6 | 0 | 1 | 7 |
| 5 | 19 | FW | (Algeria) | Islam Slimani | 1 | 0 | 4 | 5 |
| 6 | 7 | MF | (England) | Demarai Gray | 3 | 0 | 1 | 4 |
| 7 | 21 | MF | (Spain) | Vicente Iborra | 3 | 0 | 0 | 3 |
| 8 | 15 | DF | (England) | Harry Maguire | 2 | 0 | 0 | 2 |
| 8 | 11 | MF | (England) | Marc Albrighton | 2 | 0 | 0 | 2 |
| 8 | 33 | MF | (Mali) | Fousseni Diabaté | 0 | 2 | 0 | 2 |
11
| 11 | 10 | MF | (Wales) | Andy King | 1 | 0 | 0 | 1 |
| 11 | 25 | MF | (Nigeria) | Wilfred Ndidi | 0 | 1 | 0 | 1 |
| 11 | 13 | FW | (Nigeria) | Ahmed Musa | 0 | 0 | 1 | 1 |
| Own goals | | | | | 3 | 0 | 0 | 3 |
| Total | | | | | 56 | 9 | 10 | 75 |

== Awards ==
=== Club awards ===
Leicester's annual award ceremony, including categories voted for by the players and supporters, was held on 1 May 2018. The following awards were made:

| Player of the Year Award | (England) Harry Maguire |
| Young Player of the Year Award | (Nigeria) Wilfred Ndidi |
| Players' Player of the Year Award | (England) Harry Maguire |
| Academy Player of the Year Award | (England) Connor Tee |
| Development Squad Player of the Season | (England) Hamza Choudhury |
| Goal of the Season Award | (England) Jamie Vardy vs. West Brom, 10 March 2018 |
| Performance of the Season | vs. Southampton, 13 December 2017 |
