= Marc Albrighton =

English footballer (born 1989)

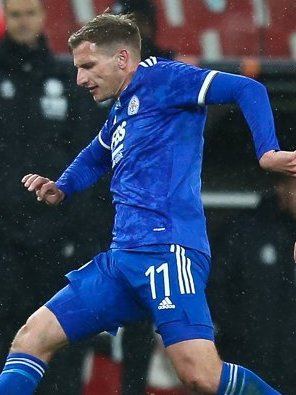
- Albrighton playing for Leicester City in 2021

Personal information
- Full name: Marc Kevin Albrighton
- Date of birth: 18 November 1989 (age 37)
- Place of birth: Tamworth, England
- Height: 5 ft 9 in (1.75 m)
- Positions: Winger; wing-back

Youth career
- 1998–2009: Aston Villa

Senior career*
Years	Team	Apps	(Gls)
2009–2014	Aston Villa	86	(7)
2013	→ Wigan Athletic (loan)	4	(0)
2014–2024	Leicester City	236	(13)
2023	→ West Bromwich Albion (loan)	17	(0)
Total		343	(20)

International career
2009	England U20	2	(0)
2010–2011	England U21	8	(1)
- * Club domestic league appearances and goals

Marc Kevin Albrighton (born 18 November 1989) is an English former professional footballer who played as a winger or wing-back.

Albrighton joined Aston Villa at the age of eight, and made his professional debut for them in 2009. He totalled nine goals in 101 professional appearances for Villa, also spending a loan spell at Wigan Athletic in 2013.

After being released in 2014, he signed for Leicester City, going on to make over 300 appearances for the club. He was a regular during the club's most successful ever era, winning the Premier League in 2016 whilst playing in every league match of the season, as well as the FA Cup in 2021, and scored key goals against both Club Brugge and Sevilla in the club's run to the quarter-finals of the 2016–17 UEFA Champions League. He departed Leicester in June 2024, retiring from football two months later.

Albrighton also represented the England U21 and U20 sides.

== Club career ==
=== Aston Villa ===
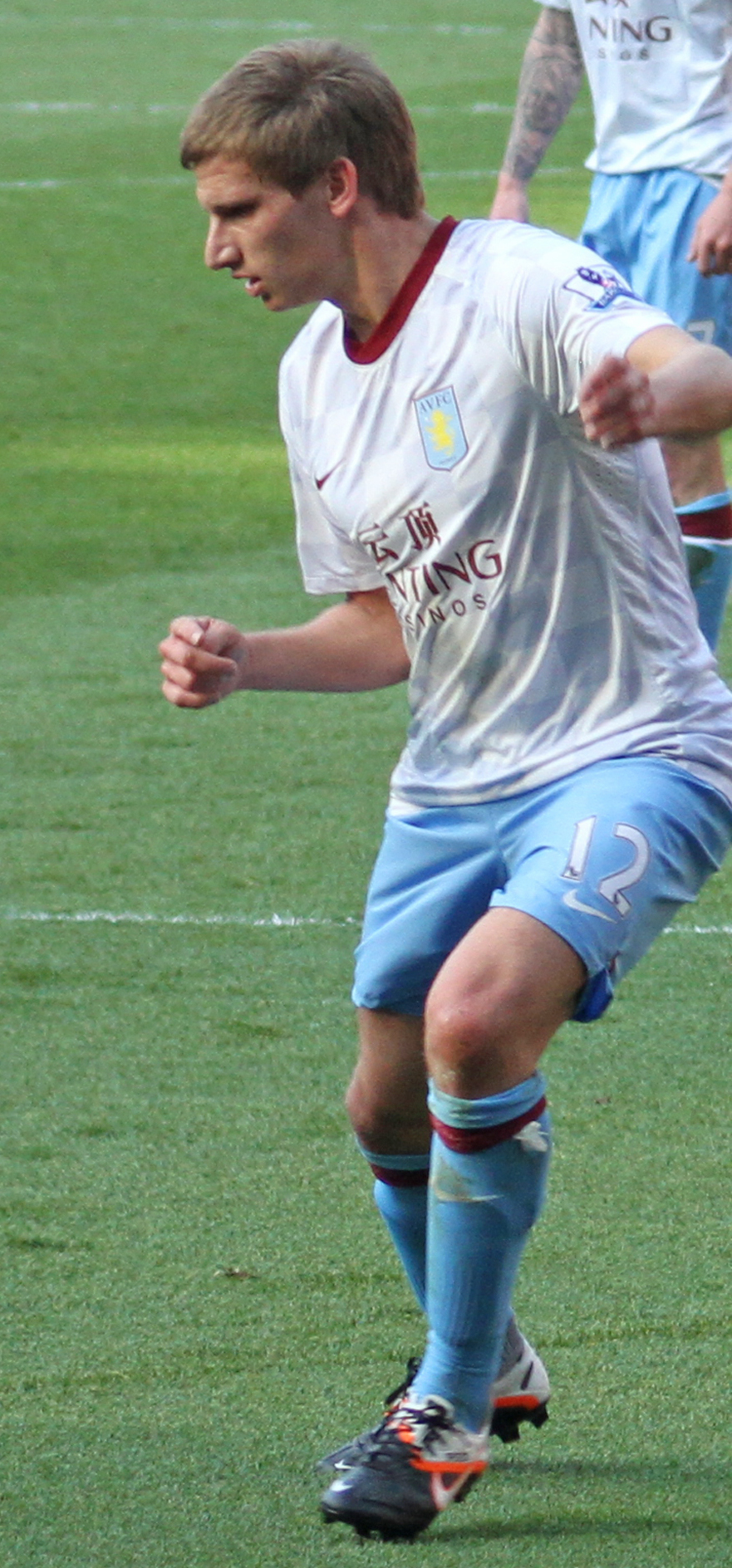
Albrighton playing for Aston Villa in 2012

==== Early career ====
Born in Tamworth, Staffordshire, Albrighton started his career at hometown club Mile Oak Monarchs, before he was offered a trial at Villa's local rivals West Bromwich Albion. He was rejected by Albion, then subsequently signed for Villa at the age of eight.

After impressing in the under-18 squad and playing in the reserves, Albrighton's first taste of senior action came on 10 July 2008, playing 17 minutes as a substitute in the 6–0 pre-season friendly victory over Wil. He made his competitive debut in the UEFA Cup match away at CSKA Moscow on 26 February 2009, a 2–0 loss (3–1 aggregate).

During the 2009–10 pre-season, Albrighton was included in the squad which played in the pre-season friendly tournament, the 2009 Peace Cup, in which he scored his first goal for the club in a 3–1 win over Atlante. He played in the Peace Cup final in which Villa beat Italians Juventus 4–3 in a penalty shootout.

==== First team ====
Albrighton made his Premier League debut on 15 August 2009, the opening day of the 2009–10 season against Wigan Athletic at Villa Park, coming on as a 68th-minute substitute for Habib Beye in a 0–2 loss. On 24 September, he extended his contract with Villa by three years. In December, manager Martin O'Neill admitted that Albrighton along with fellow youngsters Nathan Delfouneso and Ciaran Clark were the subject of many loan offers, but went on to state his belief that the trio were good enough to learn their trade in the fringes of the Aston Villa side.

After a good pre-season, Albrighton made his first Premier League start in the first match of the 2010–11 season against West Ham United on 14 August 2010, assisting two goals in Villa's 3–0 win. He scored his first goal for Villa against Tottenham Hotspur on 2 October. He was sent off against Burnley in the League Cup on 27 October, therefore missing a chance to play in the following match against local rivals Birmingham City. On 5 November, Albrighton signed a new contract keeping him at the club until 2014. On 23 November, Albrighton was ruled out of action for three to four weeks after having his appendix removed, but made his return ahead of schedule in a 3–0 defeat to Liverpool at Anfield on 6 December, playing 65 minutes before being replaced by Robert Pires. Albrighton then set up both goals for the home side in the 2–1 defeat of local rivals West Bromwich Albion in December 2010.

On 21 December 2011, he scored the Premier League's 20,000th goal at home against Arsenal, winning a £20,000 cheque from league sponsors Barclays, donated to his chosen charity, Acorns Children's Hospice. He then scored the opening goal in a 3–1 win against Bristol Rovers at the Memorial Ground in the FA Cup.

A throat operation restricted Albrighton to a single outing, in the League Cup, up to October 2013. He joined Wigan Athletic on a 28-day loan on 30 October 2013. He made four appearances for Wigan before returning to his parent club on 27 November 2013. Albrighton was released by Villa on 20 May 2014.

=== Leicester City ===
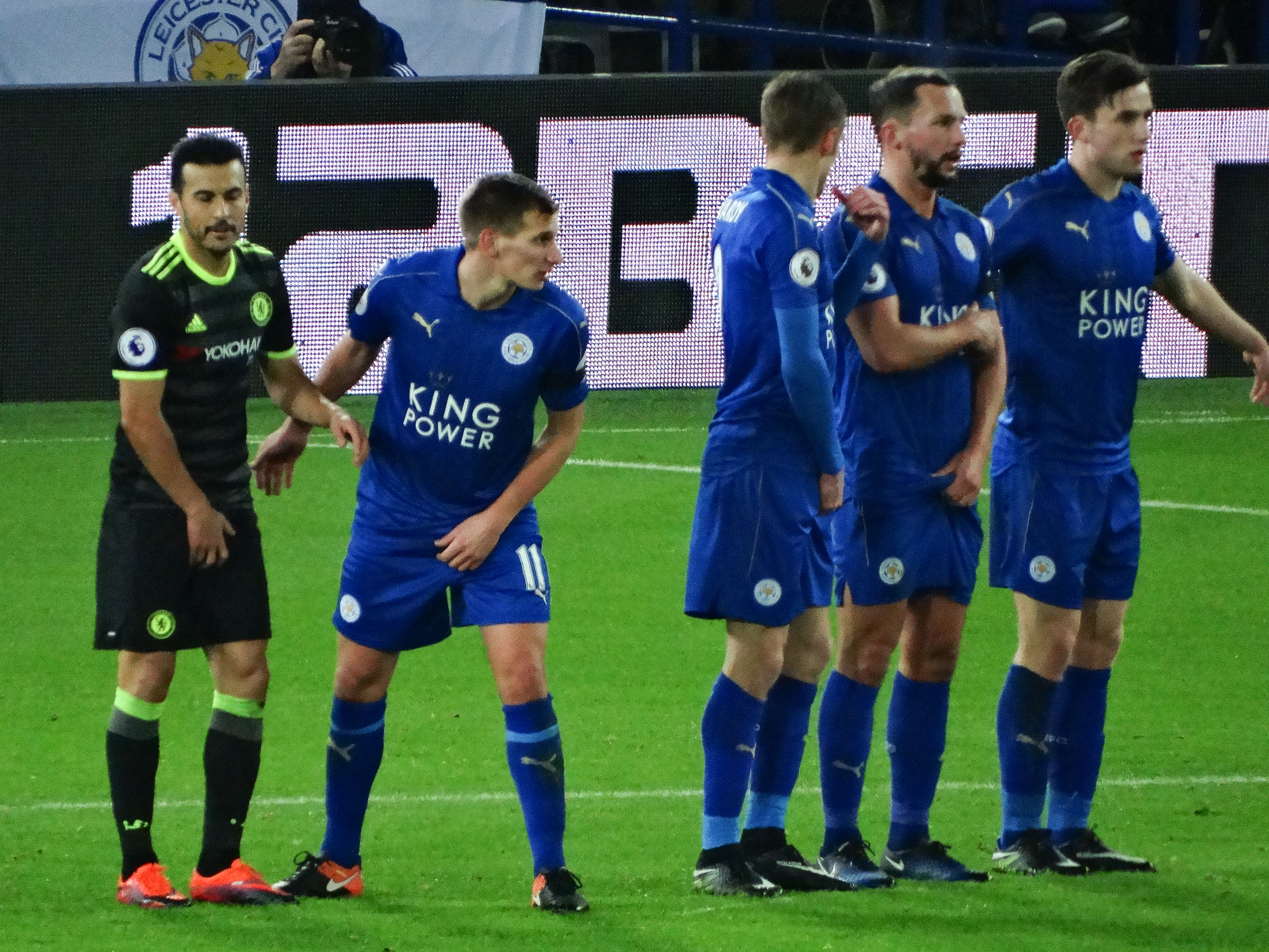
Albrighton (second from left) playing for Leicester City in 2017

==== 2014–15 season ====
On 23 May 2014, Albrighton joined Leicester City on a four-year contract, following their return to the Premier League for the first time in a decade. He made his debut for the Foxes on 23 August, replacing Riyad Mahrez for the final 22 minutes of a 2–0 loss at Chelsea. The following 29 April, in the reverse fixture at the King Power Stadium, he scored his first Leicester goal, putting Leicester ahead just before half time in an eventual 3–1 loss. Albrighton totalled 18 league appearances in his first season at his new club, adding a second goal in the last match of the season, a 5–1 win against Queens Park Rangers on 24 May. Albrighton struggled to break into the first team squad at the start of the season, but nearer the end of the year was used as a wing-back by manager Nigel Pearson in a new formation that brought Leicester success. He played an instrumental role in helping complete Leicester's 'great escape' as the team won 7 out of their last 9 matches to finish 14th.

==== 2015–16 season ====
Albrighton played more regularly under new manager Claudio Ranieri, featuring in every league match in the campaign. Albrighton scored his first goal of the season in the opening 4–2 victory over Sunderland, which set the tone for a remarkable season. He partnered N'Golo Kanté, Riyad Mahrez and Danny Drinkwater in a regular 4-man midfield as the club won their first ever top-flight title. Albrighton played on the left of midfield for the majority of the campaign, and was noted for his "diligent work defensively and when going forward, as well as his high-class crossing from open play and set pieces." with manager Ranieri claiming "Albrighton embodies the spirit of Leicester" for his "unmistakable sense of sacrifice." Whilst playing every match, Albrighton scored two goals, with his second coming in Leicester's crucial 4–0 win over Swansea on 24 April. He was rewarded with a new four-year contract in August 2016.

==== 2016–17 season ====
On 14 September 2016, Albrighton scored the club's first ever Champions League goal in a 3–0 win over Club Brugge at the Jan Breydel Stadium. He was the first Leicester player to score in a European competition since Muzzy Izzet against Red Star Belgrade in September 2000. Albrighton described the goal as "probably one of the greatest achievements of my career so far".

On 25 February 2017, reports emerged alleging that Albrighton was among several teammates who met with chairman Vichai Srivaddhanaprabha following their 2–1 Champions League defeat at Sevilla on 22 February, which led to manager Claudio Ranieri being sacked. Albrighton dismissed the claims as "totally incorrect".

In Leicester City's Champions League Last 16 tie against Sevilla on 14 March 2017, Albrighton scored the second goal for the hosts which capped off a remarkable win, sealing a 3–2 aggregate win and progression to the quarter-finals.

==== 2017–2023 ====
Leicester City finished in 9th place in consecutive seasons in 2017–18 and 2018–19 with Albrighton scoring two league goals in each season respectively. After Brendan Rodgers was appointed new Leicester City manager in February 2019, Albrighton continued to be a crucial and reliable member of the first-team squad, with his versatility allowing him to play both on the flanks and in defence. The Foxes ended the 2019–20 season in fifth place to qualify for the group stage of the 2020–21 UEFA Europa League.

On 9 January 2021, Albrighton scored his first goal for Leicester for 53 matches in all competitions, netting his side's second in their 4–0 win over Stoke City in the third round of the FA Cup. His first Premier League goal of the 2020–21 season came on 8 May 2021 in a 2–4 home defeat against Newcastle United. He would help the Foxes win their first-ever FA Cup later that month, coming on for an injured Jonny Evans in the 34th minute in the final.

On 30 July 2021, Albrighton signed a new contract to stay at Leicester until 2024. Albrighton made an appearance off the bench in Leicester's 1–0 triumph over reigning Premier League champions Manchester City in the FA Community Shield on 7 August 2021.

==== 2023: Loan to West Bromwich Albion ====
On 31 January 2023, West Bromwich Albion completed the signing of Albrighton from Leicester City on loan until the end of the season.

==== 2023–24: Return to Leicester, Championship title and retirement ====
Albrighton returned to Leicester City for the 2023–24 season, where they achieved the EFL Championship, securing promotion back to the Premier League. On 7 June 2024, he was among the players announced to depart Leicester City upon the conclusion of the season, ending his ten-year spell with the club. He was one of the last remaining players from Leicester's Premier League winning side, alongside Jamie Vardy.

On 29 August 2024, Albrighton officially announced his retirement from professional football on social media.

== International career ==
On 2 April 2009, Albrighton made his debut for the England under-20s. He made his debut for the England U21 team in September 2010 during their Euro 2011 qualifying play-offs, and scored just fifteen minutes after coming on as a substitute.

== Personal life ==
Albrighton confirmed to the Birmingham Mail that his dreams came true in playing for Aston Villa Football club, the team he has supported since he was a boy. He named former Villa players David Ginola, Benito Carbone and Robert Pires as some of his footballing role models, along with England legend David Beckham to whom he has been compared due to crossing ability and technique.

Albrighton became a father for the first time on 19 February 2012 when his partner Chloe Fulford gave birth to a daughter in Sutton Coldfield. Fulford's mother, Sue Davey, was killed in the Tunisian terror attacks in June 2015.

== Career statistics ==
Appearances and goals by club, season and competition
Club	Season	League			FA Cup		League Cup		Europe		Other		Total	
Club	Season	Division	Apps	Goals	Apps	Goals	Apps	Goals	Apps	Goals	Apps	Goals	Apps	Goals
Aston Villa	2008–09	Premier League	0	0	0	0	0	0	1 (Note: Appearance in UEFA Cup)	0	—		1	0
Aston Villa	2009–10	Premier League	3	0	1	0	1	0	1 (Note: Appearance(s) in UEFA Europa League)	0	—		6	0
Aston Villa	2010–11	Premier League	29	5	2	1	1	0	1	0	—		33	6
Aston Villa	2011–12	Premier League	26	2	1	1	2	0	—		—		29	3
Aston Villa	2012–13	Premier League	9	0	1	0	1	0	—		—		11	0
Aston Villa	2013–14	Premier League	19	0	1	0	1	0	—		—		21	0
Aston Villa	Total		86	7	6	2	6	0	3	0	—		101	9
Wigan Athletic (loan)	2013–14	Championship	4	0	—		—		—		—		4	0
Leicester City	2014–15	Premier League	18	2	2	0	0	0	—		—		20	2
Leicester City	2015–16	Premier League	38	2	2	0	2	0	—		—		42	2
Leicester City	2016–17	Premier League	33	2	4	0	0	0	9 (Note: Appearances in UEFA Champions League)	2	1 (Note: Appearance in FA Community Shield)	0	47	4
Leicester City	2017–18	Premier League	34	2	5	0	3	0	—		—		42	2
Leicester City	2018–19	Premier League	27	2	1	0	4	1	—		—		32	3
Leicester City	2019–20	Premier League	20	0	4	0	4	0	—		—		28	0
Leicester City	2020–21	Premier League	31	1	5	1	1	0	5	0	—		42	2
Leicester City	2021–22	Premier League	17	1	1	1	2	0	10 (Note: Three appearances in UEFA Europa League, seven appearances and one goal in UEFA Europa Conference League)	1	1	0	31	3
Leicester City	2022–23	Premier League	6	1	1	0	4	0	—		—		11	1
Leicester City	2023–24	Championship	12	0	3	0	3	0	—		—		18	0
Leicester City	Total		236	13	28	2	23	1	24	3	2	0	313	19
West Bromwich Albion (loan)	2022–23	Championship	17	0	—		—		—		—		17	0
Career total			343	20	34	4	29	1	27	3	2	0	435	28

== Honours ==
Leicester City

- Premier League: 2015–16
- FA Cup: 2020–21
- FA Community Shield: 2021
- EFL Championship: 2023–24

=== Individual ===
- Honorary Freedom of the Borough of Tamworth: 2022
