= Kelechi Iheanacho =

Nigerian footballer (born 1996)

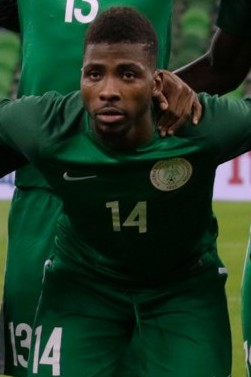
- Iheanacho with Nigeria in 2017

Personal information
- Full name: Kelechi Promise Iheanacho
- Date of birth: 3 October 1996 (age 30)
- Place of birth: Owerri, Imo State, Nigeria
- Height: 1.85 m (6 ft 1 in)
- Position: Forward

Team information
- Current team: Bursaspor
- Number: 14

Youth career
- 2011–2014: Taye Academy
- 2014–2015: Manchester City

Senior career*
| Years | Team | Apps | (Gls) |
| 2015–2017 | Manchester City | 46 | (12) |
| 2017–2024 | Leicester City | 173 | (35) |
| 2024–2025 | Sevilla | 9 | (0) |
| 2025 | → Middlesbrough (loan) | 15 | (1) |
| 2025–2026 | Celtic | 13 | (5) |
| 2026– | Bursaspor | 14 | (17) |

International career^{‡}
| 2013–2015 | Nigeria U17 | 7 | (8) |
| 2015–2017 | Nigeria U20 | 2 | (0) |
| 2015– | Nigeria | 59 | (15) |
Medal record
Representing Nigeria
Men's football
Africa Cup of Nations
| Runner-up | 2023 |
FIFA U-17 World Cup
| Winner | 2013 |
- * Club domestic league appearances and goals as of 19:20, 6 November 2026 (UTC) ‡ National team caps and goals as of 23:24, 6 October 2026 (UTC)

Kelechi Promise Iheanacho MON (Igbo: Ịheanachọ; born 3 October 1996) is a Nigerian professional footballer who plays as a forward for TFF First League club Bursaspor and the Nigeria national team.

Iheanacho began his senior career at Manchester City during the 2015–16 season, winning the Football League Cup. He moved to Leicester City in 2017 for a reported £25 million fee, the largest ever transfer amount for a Nigerian player at the time and the second-largest for an African player after Egyptian Mohamed Salah. Iheanacho was instrumental in Leicester City's 2020–21 FA Cup win, scoring a joint-high four goals across the edition as the club won the trophy for the first time. He also scored the sole goal from the penalty spot as Leicester won the 2021 FA Community Shield.

At international level, Iheanacho represented Nigeria's under-17 team at the 2013 FIFA U-17 World Cup, being named the tournament's best player and finishing as the second-highest goalscorer as he led the side to their record fourth title. He would then be included in Nigeria's under-20 team for the 2015 FIFA U-20 World Cup, before making his senior international debut later the same year. Since then, he has represented the country at the 2018 FIFA World Cup, as well as the 2021 and 2023 Africa Cup of Nations, finishing as runner-up in the latter tournament. Iheanacho was voted the Most Promising African Talent twice in 2013 and 2016 and named as a substitute for the 2016 CAF Team of the Year.

== Club career ==
=== Manchester City ===
==== Early career ====
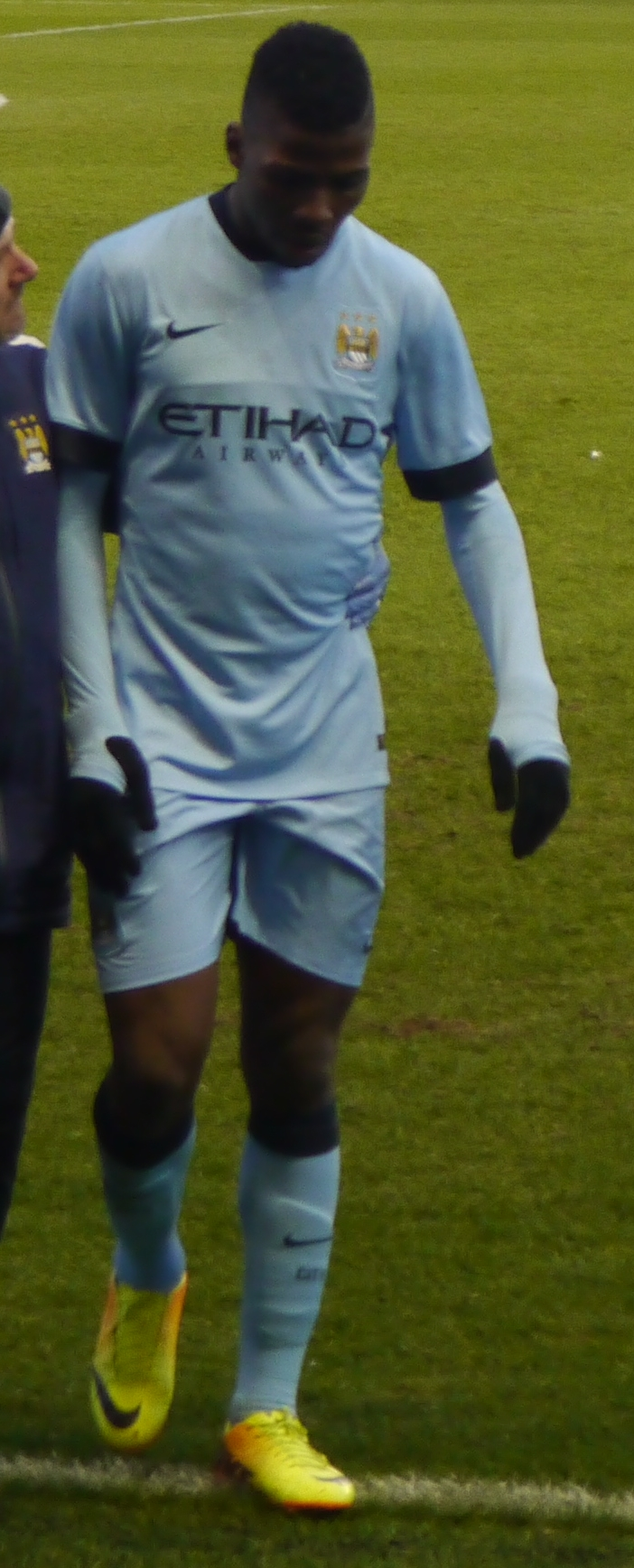
Iheanacho with Manchester City in 2015

Iheanacho was born in Owerri, Imo State. As a youth, he represented Taye Academy in Owerri, the capital city of Imo. His performances for Nigeria in the 2013 FIFA U-17 World Cup led to interest from clubs in Europe; teams following his progress included Arsenal, Sporting CP and Porto. In December 2012, Iheanacho travelled to England to discuss a move to Manchester City. He signed a pre-contract agreement with the club, stating his intent to formally sign for City on his 18th birthday in October 2014. In the interim, he returned to Nigeria. As the year drew to a close, the Confederation of African Football (CAF) named him the Most Promising Talent of the Year for 2013 at the CAF Awards of 2013.

Iheanacho joined Manchester City's Academy on 10 January 2015. Before the 2014–15 season, City visited the United States on a pre-season tour, and although still not formally a City player, he joined up with the squad. He played and scored in the first match of the tour, a 4–1 win against Sporting Kansas City, and scored again against AC Milan in a 5–1 win. After the conclusion of the tour, Manchester City arranged for Iheanacho to train with the Columbus Crew until mid-October.

Delays in obtaining a work permit meant Iheanacho was unable to play in England until February 2015. He made his debut at under-19 level in a UEFA Youth League match against Schalke 04, but sustained an injury after only 11 minutes. After his recovery, he began to represent Manchester City at both youth and under-21 level in the latter part of the season. He played in the FA Youth Cup final, where he scored, but ended on the losing side after Chelsea claimed a 5–2 aggregate victory. The following week, he scored the only goal as Manchester City beat Porto in the final of the 2014–15 Premier League International Cup.

==== 2015–16 season ====
In July 2015, Iheanacho was included in City's pre-season tour team in Australia. On the tour, he set up the first goal for Raheem Sterling and scored the second goal in the win against Roma in the 2015 International Champions Cup. He also set up Sterling for the fourth goal in City's 8–1 victory against the Vietnam national team. In City's last preseason game, against VfB Stuttgart, he came on as a substitute, scoring late in a 4–2 defeat. Due to his impressive pre-season, Iheanacho was promoted to the Manchester City senior squad.

On 10 August 2015, Iheanacho was included in a first-team matchday squad for the first time in a competitive fixture, however he remained an unused substitute in their 3–0 win at West Bromwich Albion in their first game of the Premier League season. Nineteen days later, he made his competitive debut, replacing Raheem Sterling for the final minute of a 2–0 win against Watford at the City of Manchester Stadium. He scored his first competitive goal on 12 September, replacing Wilfried Bony in the final minute in a match away to Crystal Palace and scoring the only goal of the game.

Iheanacho scored his first career hat-trick on 30 January 2016 against Aston Villa in the fourth round of the FA Cup, also setting up City's fourth goal, scored by Raheem Sterling. The following month, he was put in City's UEFA Champions League squad at the expense of the injured Samir Nasri. During February, Iheanacho scored against Tottenham Hotspur in a 2–1 home defeat for City.

Iheanacho's next goals came on 23 April 2016, where he scored twice against Stoke City in a 4–0 victory. He followed this up with a Champions League semi-final substitute appearance on 26 April 2016. Five days later, on 1 May 2016, he scored a brace again, albeit in a 4–2 defeat at the hands of Southampton. Iheanacho ended the 2015–16 season with eight Premier League goals and had the best goals-per-minute ratio of any player, averaging a goal every 93.9 minutes. In all competitions he finished with a record of 14 goals and 5 assists from 35 appearances, although he only started 11 of these games. His goals total also meant he ended the season as City's third-highest scorer.

==== 2016–17 season ====
On 10 September 2016, Iheanacho started in the Manchester derby. He recorded an assist and his first goal of the season in a 2–1 win for City. Four days later, Iheanacho came off the bench to score the final goal in City's 4–0 home win in the Champions League, against Borussia Mönchengladbach. This was his first European goal for Manchester City. Three days after the 4–0 win, Iheanacho scored the second goal, also assisting the third, in City's game against AFC Bournemouth. That goal took his tally in the Premier League to 10, allowing him to join an exclusive list of players to have scored 10 Premier League goals before the age of 20. This list includes players such as Wayne Rooney, Ryan Giggs, Nicolas Anelka, Michael Owen and Romelu Lukaku.

In October 2016, Iheanacho was nominated for the FIFA Golden Boy award, which was eventually won by Bayern Munich's midfielder Renato Sanches. Previous winners of the award include teammates Raheem Sterling and Sergio Agüero.

Iheanacho's next goal would come in the Champions League, against Celtic, in a 1–1 home draw on 6 December 2016. Iheanacho's final goal of the season, and subsequently final goal for City, came against Huddersfield in a 5–1 FA Cup fifth round replay win, in which Iheanacho scored the final goal of the game.

=== Leicester City ===
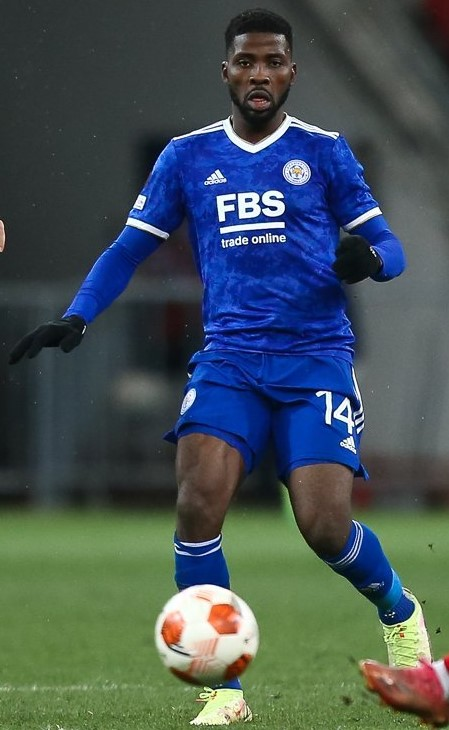
Iheanacho on the ball for Leicester City in 2021

==== 2017–2020 ====
Iheanacho was signed by Premier League club Leicester City on a five-year contract on 3 August 2017, for a reported £25 million fee. He made his debut for the club in a 4–3 defeat to Arsenal on 11 August 2017. He scored his first goal for Leicester in an EFL Cup tie against Leeds United on 24 October 2017. On 16 January 2018, Iheanacho became the first player in English football to be awarded a goal due to video assistant referee, as the referee deemed that the player had been incorrectly ruled offside for his second goal. The goal was Iheanacho's second in a 2–0 win over Fleetwood Town in the FA Cup Third Round replay.

==== 2021–2024 ====
Iheanacho wasn't in the first-choice starting eleven at the start of the season, and only started two of Leicester's first 21 Premier League games. However, several injuries to key players meant that Iheanacho got an extended run of games. Iheanacho then went on a goal-scoring run of 12 goals in 10 games in all competitions during March and April of 2021.

Iheanacho scored his first Premier League hat-trick in a 5–0 win against Sheffield United on 14 March 2021. A week later, Iheanacho netted a brace in Leicester's 3–1 win over Manchester United in the quarter-finals of the FA Cup, sending the club into the semi-finals of the competition for the first time since 1981–82. The two strikes were Iheanacho's eighth and ninth goals in his last nine matches in all competitions. Iheanacho won the Premier League Player of the Month award in March 2021 after scoring five goals in three league appearances. On 3 April, Iheanacho signed a new three-year contract with Leicester, keeping him at the club until at least 2024. On 18 April, Iheanacho scored the only goal in a 1–0 win over Southampton in the FA Cup semi-final at Wembley Stadium. The win took the Foxes to their first FA Cup final since 1969.

Iheanacho and Leicester started the 2021–22 season with the 2021 FA Community Shield against Manchester City. Iheanacho was substituted on during the 79th minute and scored the winning goal, an 89th-minute penalty against his former club.

Iheanacho received Leicester's Player of the Year award following the end of the 2022–23 season that resulted in the club's relegation from the Premier League.

In the 2023–24 season, Iheanacho scored six goals in 26 matches in all competitions, as his club managed to achieve the EFL Championship title, securing promotion back to the Premier League. On 7 June 2024, Leicester confirmed that Iheanacho would not sign a new contract with the club and would be released, ending his seven-year stay with the club.

=== Sevilla ===
On 31 July 2024, Iheanacho joined Spanish club Sevilla on a free transfer following the expiration of his contract at Leicester. On 1 September 2025, the club agreed to terminate his contract by mutual consent, after he scored 3 goals in 11 appearances in all competitions during his time in Spain.

==== Loan to Middlesbrough ====
On 3 February 2025, Iheanacho moved to Championship club Middlesbrough on loan until the end of the season. He scored 1 goal in 15 games during his loan spell at the club.

=== Celtic ===
On 2 September 2025, Iheanacho signed for Scottish Premiership side Celtic on a one-year contract, with the club having an option for another year. His arrival meant that he would reunite with his former manager at Leicester City Brendan Rodgers as well as his former teammate Kasper Schmeichel. Iheanacho made his debut for Celtic against Kilmarnock on 14 September, coming on as a substitute and scoring a last-minute penalty to win the match 2–1.

He also came on later in the season against St Mirren in the Scottish Cup on 19 April 2026, scoring twice in extra time to help Celtic win 6-2 and advance to the final. He scored another winner against Hibernian at Easter Road on 3 May, followed by a 99th-minute penalty against Motherwell at Fir Park to win the match 3–2 and keep Celtic within touching distance of Hearts.

On 16 May, Celtic played Hearts in the final game of the season. Iheanacho replaced Sebastian Tounekti at half-time, and was instrumental in helping turn the game around in Celtic's favour, as they won the match 3–1 and snatched the title from Heart of Midlothian in the final minutes of the season.

=== Bursaspor ===
On 17 July 2026, Iheanacho signed for TFF 1. Lig side Bursaspor.

== International career ==
=== Youth ===
Iheanacho has represented Nigeria at youth levels from under-13 upwards. His first experience of a major international tournament was the 2013 African U-17 Championship in Morocco. For Iheanacho, the highlight was a hat-trick in a win against Botswana. He dedicated his goals to his mother, who died two months before the tournament. Nigeria reached the final of the competition, where they were defeated on penalties by the Ivory Coast.

Iheanacho played a significant role in the 2013 FIFA U-17 World Cup, where he won the Golden Ball award for player of the tournament. Nigeria won the competition, in which Iheanacho scored six times, including once in the final, and provided seven assists. In the run-up to the 2014 African Nations Championship, Iheanacho trained with the senior Nigeria squad but was released from the squad in order to travel to England to sign with Manchester City. He was part of the Nigeria squad for the 2015 FIFA U-20 World Cup in New Zealand, and featured in two matches.

Iheanacho was selected by Nigeria for their 35-man provisional squad for the 2016 Summer Olympics, but failed to make the final 18.

=== Senior ===
Iheanacho made his senior debut as a substitute in a 2018 FIFA World Cup qualifying match against Eswatini in which Nigeria drew 0–0. His first start for the senior team was on 25 March 2016, a 1–1 draw with Egypt in a 2017 Africa Cup of Nations qualifying match.

Iheanacho was selected by Nigeria in friendly matches against Mali and Luxembourg in May 2016. He scored in the two games, providing an assist against Luxembourg.

His performance in the friendly matches inspired further confidence within football circles in the nation and was invited to make his competitive debut against Egypt in an African Cup of Nations qualifying series where he provided an assist for Oghenekaro Etebo in the home game.

Despite the change made in the coaching personnel in August 2016, he distinguished himself again as one of the most important players in the team when he scored two superb goals in the two matches against Tanzania in Uyo and Zambia in Ndola, during the AFCON and 2018 World Cup qualifications respectively.

In June 2018, he was named in Nigeria's 23-man squad for the 2018 World Cup in Russia.

On 25 December 2021, Iheanacho was shortlisted in Nigeria's 2021 Africa Cup of Nations 28-man squad by caretaker coach Austin Eguavoen. He scored Nigeria's first goal of the tournament in the 30th minute of their opening match victory against Egypt.

In December 2023, he was called up for the 2023 Africa Cup of Nations in Ivory Coast. In the semi-final match against South Africa, Iheanacho, coming off the bench, scored the winning penalty in a 4–2 victory during the shootouts following a 1–1 draw, which qualified his country to the final.

== Player profile ==
=== Style of play ===
Affectionately known as the Senior Man in his native Nigeria, Iheanacho is known for his vision, dribbling, speed, finishing and athleticism. Although mainly a striker, he is able to play anywhere in the final third, and was once described by pundits as one of the most efficient strikers in England.

=== Reception ===
Iheanacho first rose to prominence in 2013 after the FIFA U-17 World Cup as an attacking midfielder. Manuel Pellegrini has profiled him as an important and hard working player. His manager, Brendan Rodgers described him as an incredible, hardworking, and a highly talented player with no ego, in an interview with BBC and Sky Sports. FA Cup named him one of the most iconic black players in the history of the competition. BBC and other several media outlets profiled him as the “deadliest striker in Europe”, and has been deemed as the most in-form striker in Premier League while praising his speed rate at scoring goals. Former British strikers and sports pundits, Gary Lineker and Alan Shearer, described him as “bag of talents” and a player who has a great pace and massive potentials. His manager, Craig Shakespeare proclaimed him as an enormously talented player that has shown a huge amount of promise at every level in which he's played. His compatriot, Isaac Success described him as the best player he has ever played with in his entire career.

As of 2015 and 2016, Iheanacho emerged as the player who has the best goals-per-minute record in Premier League history and currently the only African to do so, and was proclaimed Premier League and Europe's "Most Prolific Goal Scorer" by The Telegraph, Sky Sports and various other media outlets. Former English Ballon d'Or nominee and pundit Rio Ferdinand has described him, saying to Sports Extra; 'Kelechi at the moment is the best Nigerian player playing in the EPL this season, because he scores goals man, he's a goalscorer'. Emerging Nigerian football talents often consider Iheanacho a role model. He idolizes Kaka, Wayne Rooney, Didier Drogba and Leo Messi, and has profiled Ronaldinho and Sergio Aguero as his inspirations, also former Leicester teammate Jamie Vardy who has been described by pundits as his rival. But he has rejected this and cited him as a legend and a motivation for him to become a better player. He has also expressed his interest to emulate attacking midfielder Jay-Jay Okocha and forward Nwankwo Kanu in the Premier League and they have both cited Iheanacho as a great player and one of the best strikers in the world.

=== Goal celebration trademark ===
After scoring a goal, Iheanacho's goal celebration trademark is going on his knees and pointing with both hands to the sky, inspired by his favorite wrestler, Bryan Danielson. In 2013, Danielson acknowledged Iheanacho after he was instrumental in Nigeria's win over Mexico, scoring four goals.

== Personal life ==
Iheanacho is from the Igbo ethnic group of Nigeria. He is a Christian.

== Career statistics ==
=== Club ===
As of match played 6 November 2026

Appearances and goals by club, season and competition
| Club | Season | League | | | National cup (Note: Includes FA Cup, Copa del Rey, Scottish Cup) | | League cup (Note: Includes Football League/EFL Cup, Scottish League Cup) | | Europe | | Other | | Total | |
| Club | Season | Division | Apps | Goals | Apps | Goals | Apps | Goals | Apps | Goals | Apps | Goals | Apps | Goals |
|---|---|---|---|---|---|---|---|---|---|---|---|---|---|---|
| Manchester City | 2015–16 | Premier League | 26 | 8 | 3 | 4 | 2 | 2 | 4 (Note: Appearances in UEFA Champions League) | 0 | — | | 35 | 14 |
| Manchester City | 2016–17 | Premier League | 20 | 4 | 3 | 1 | 2 | 0 | 4 | 2 | — | | 29 | 7 |
| Manchester City | Total | | 46 | 12 | 6 | 5 | 4 | 2 | 8 | 2 | — | | 64 | 21 |
| Leicester City | 2017–18 | Premier League | 21 | 3 | 5 | 4 | 2 | 1 | — | | — | | 28 | 8 |
| Leicester City | 2018–19 | Premier League | 30 | 1 | 1 | 0 | 4 | 1 | — | | — | | 35 | 2 |
| Leicester City | 2019–20 | Premier League | 20 | 5 | 2 | 1 | 4 | 4 | — | | — | | 26 | 10 |
| Leicester City | 2020–21 | Premier League | 25 | 12 | 6 | 4 | 1 | 0 | 7 (Note: Appearances in UEFA Europa League) | 3 | — | | 39 | 19 |
| Leicester City | 2021–22 | Premier League | 26 | 4 | 1 | 1 | 3 | 1 | 12 (Note: Four appearances in UEFA Europa League, eight appearances and one goal in UEFA Europa Conference League) | 1 | 1 (Note: Appearance in FA Community Shield) | 1 | 43 | 8 |
| Leicester City | 2022–23 | Premier League | 28 | 5 | 3 | 3 | 4 | 0 | — | | — | | 35 | 8 |
| Leicester City | 2023–24 | Championship | 23 | 5 | 1 | 0 | 2 | 1 | — | | — | | 26 | 6 |
| Leicester City | Total | | 173 | 35 | 19 | 13 | 20 | 8 | 19 | 4 | 1 | 1 | 232 | 61 |
| Sevilla | 2024–25 | La Liga | 9 | 0 | 2 | 3 | — | | — | | — | | 11 | 3 |
| Middlesbrough (loan) | 2024–25 | Championship | 15 | 1 | — | | — | | — | | — | | 15 | 1 |
| Celtic | 2025–26 | Scottish Premiership | 13 | 5 | 2 | 3 | 2 | 0 | 7 | 1 | — | | 24 | 9 |
| Bursaspor | 2026–27 | TFF First League | 14 | 17 | 0 | 0 | — | | — | | — | | 14 | 17 |
| Career total | | | 270 | 70 | 29 | 24 | 26 | 10 | 34 | 7 | 1 | 1 | 360 | 112 |

=== International ===
As of match played 6 October 2026

Appearances and goals by national team and year
| National team | Year | Apps | Goals |
|---|---|---|---|
| Nigeria | 2015 | 1 | 0 |
| Nigeria | 2016 | 6 | 4 |
| Nigeria | 2017 | 6 (Note: Iheanacho also appeared in one match against Togo in 2017, scoring one goal, however Nigeria made nine substitutions during this match, and therefore it is not recognised as an official match by FIFA.) | 3 |
| Nigeria | 2018 | 11 | 0 |
| Nigeria | 2020 | 4 | 1 |
| Nigeria | 2021 | 9 | 2 |
| Nigeria | 2022 | 6 | 1 |
| Nigeria | 2023 | 6 | 3 |
| Nigeria | 2024 | 7 | 0 |
| Nigeria | 2025 | 2 | 0 |
| Nigeria | 2026 | 1 | 1 |
| Total | | 59 | 15 |

As of match played 6 October 2026
Nigeria score listed first, score column indicates score after each Iheanacho goal.

List of international goals scored by Kelechi Iheanacho
| No. | Date | Venue | Opponent | Score | Result | Competition |
|---|---|---|---|---|---|---|
| 1 | 27 May 2016 | Stade Robert Diochon, Rouen, France | Mali | 1–0 | 1–0 | Friendly |
| 2 | 31 May 2016 | Stade Josy Barthel, Luxembourg City, Luxembourg | Luxembourg | 2–0 | 3–1 | Friendly |
| 3 | 3 September 2016 | Akwa Ibom Stadium, Uyo, Nigeria | Tanzania | 1–0 | 1–0 | 2017 Africa Cup of Nations qualification |
| 4 | 9 October 2016 | Levy Mwanawasa Stadium, Ndola, Zambia | Zambia | 2–0 | 2–1 | 2018 FIFA World Cup qualification |
| 5 | 23 March 2017 | The Hive Stadium, London, England | Senegal | 1–1 | 1–1 | Friendly |
| * | 1 June 2017 | Stade Municipal de Saint-Leu-la-Forêt, Paris, France | Togo | 3–0 | 3–0 | Friendly |
| 6 | 1 September 2017 | Akwa Ibom Stadium, Uyo, Nigeria | Cameroon | 4–0 | 4–0 | 2018 FIFA World Cup qualification |
| 7 | 14 November 2017 | Krasnodar Stadium, Krasnodar, Russia | Argentina | 1–2 | 4–2 | Friendly |
| 8 | 13 October 2020 | Jacques Lemans Arena, Sankt Veit an der Glan, Austria | Tunisia | 1–0 | 1–1 | Friendly |
| 9 | 3 September 2021 | Teslim Balogun Stadium, Lagos, Nigeria | Liberia | 1–0 | 2–0 | 2022 FIFA World Cup qualification |
| 10 | 3 September 2021 | Teslim Balogun Stadium, Lagos, Nigeria | Liberia | 2–0 | 2–0 | 2022 FIFA World Cup qualification |
| 11 | 11 January 2022 | Roumdé Adjia Stadium, Garoua, Cameroon | Egypt | 1–0 | 1–0 | 2021 Africa Cup of Nations |
| 12 | 18 June 2023 | Samuel Kanyon Doe Sports Complex, Monrovia, Liberia | Sierra Leone | 3–2 | 3–2 | 2023 Africa Cup of Nations qualification |
| 13 | 13 October 2023 | Estádio Municipal de Portimão, Portimão, Portugal | Saudi Arabia | 2–1 | 2–2 | Friendly |
| 14 | 19 November 2023 | Stade Huye, Butare, Rwanda | Zimbabwe | 1–1 | 1–1 | 2026 FIFA World Cup qualification |
| 15 | 6 October 2026 | Nizhny Novgorod Stadium, Nizhny Novgorod, Russia | Russia | 1–0 | 3–3 | Friendly |

== Honours ==
Manchester City

- Football League Cup: 2015–16

Leicester City

- FA Cup: 2020–21
- FA Community Shield: 2021
- EFL Championship: 2023–24

Celtic

- Scottish Premiership: 2025–26
- Scottish Cup: 2025–26

Nigeria U17

- FIFA U-17 World Cup: 2013

Nigeria

- Africa Cup of Nations runner-up: 2023

Individual

- FIFA U-17 World Cup Golden Ball: 2013
- FIFA U-17 World Cup Silver Shoe: 2013
- CAF Most Promising Talent of the Year: 2013, 2016
- CAF Team of the Year: 2016 (as a substitute)
- CAF U-17 African Championship Silver Shoe: 2013
- Premier League Player of the Month: March 2021
- Leicester City Player of the Year: 2022–23

Orders

- Member of the Order of the Niger
