= 2021 FA Community Shield =

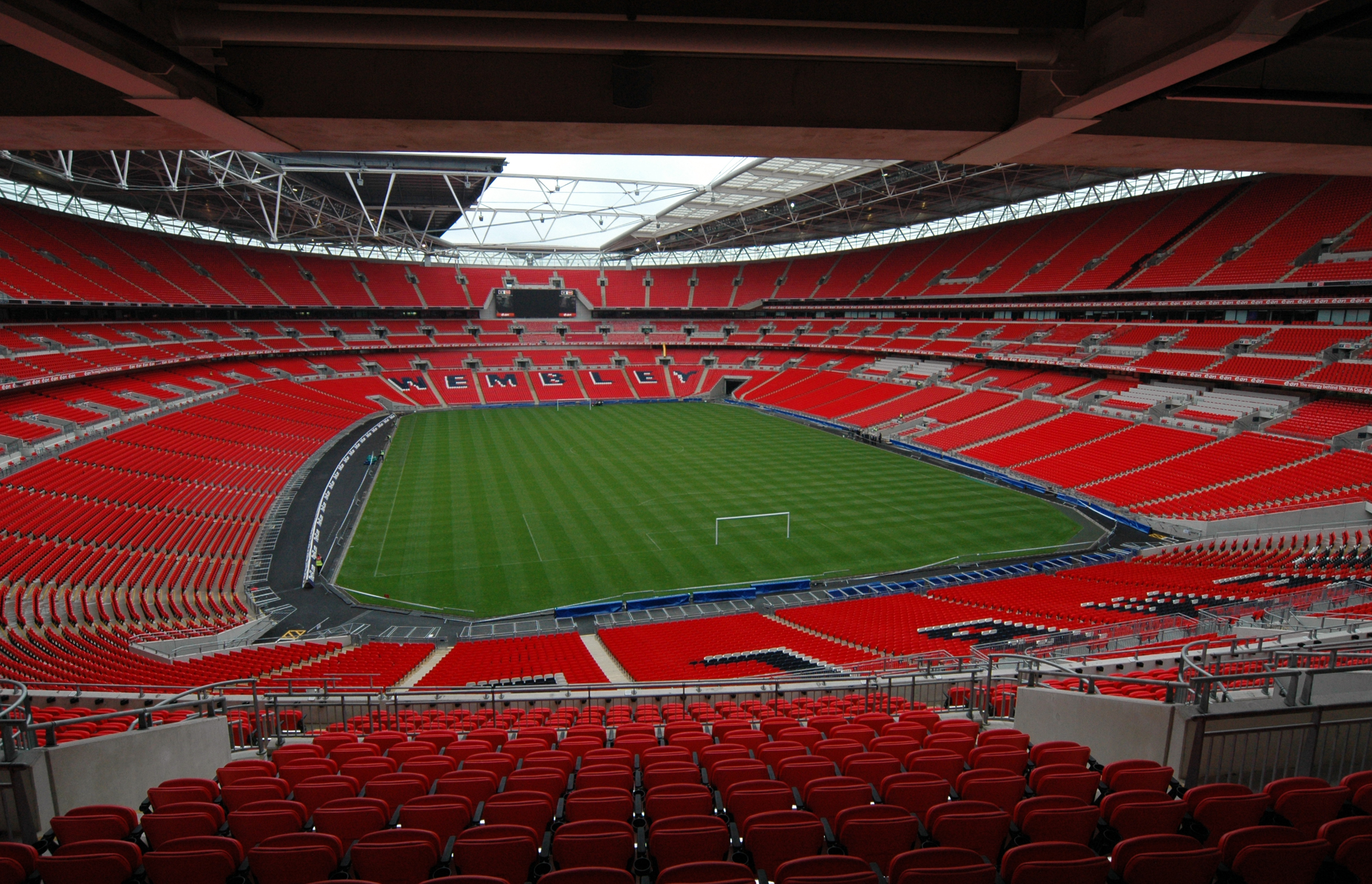
- Wembley Stadium in London hosted the match.
Leicester City	Manchester City
1	0
- Date: 7 August 2021
- Venue: Wembley Stadium, London
- Man of the Match: Kelechi Iheanacho (Leicester City)
- Referee: Paul Tierney (Lancashire)
- Attendance: 45,602

The 2021 FA Community Shield (also known as The FA Community Shield supported by McDonald's for sponsorship reasons) was the 99th FA Community Shield, an annual football match played between the winners of the previous season's Premier League, Manchester City, and the winners of the previous season's FA Cup, Leicester City. This was Manchester City's first FA Community Shield appearance since 2019 when they beat Liverpool 5–4 on penalties after a 1–1 draw, and Leicester's first since losing 2–1 to Manchester United in the 2016 edition. The game was played on 7 August 2021 at Wembley Stadium in Wembley, London, with Leicester beating Manchester City 1–0 with a 89th-minute penalty by Kelechi Iheanacho.

Arsenal were the holders having won the 2020 edition, but did not qualify for this match, as they finished eighth in the Premier League and were knocked out of the FA Cup in the fourth round. The match was televised live on ITV. It was the first time the FA Community Shield went free-to-air on television since the 2012 FA Community Shield, which was also shown on ITV.

== Background ==
Leicester City won their first FA Cup title after beating Chelsea 1–0 in the final. They were appearing in their third FA Community Shield match, having won one (1971), and lost one (2016).

Manchester City won their third Premier League title in four years under the management of Pep Guardiola, after derby rivals Manchester United lost 2–1 to Leicester at Old Trafford on 11 May 2021. They were appearing in their 13th match, having won six (1937, 1968, 1972, 2012, 2018, 2019), and lost six (1934, 1956, 1969, 1973, 2011, 2014).

== Match ==
=== Summary ===
In the first half, Steffen managed to save a shot from Vardy with his trailing right foot while diving to the left, with ball coming back off the left post. In the last minute of the match Leicester were awarded a penalty when Aké tripped former City forward Kelechi Iheanacho in the penalty area after he had failed to control a pass from Rodri. Iheanacho scored the penalty left-footed to the right of the net to win the game 1–0. This was the first time that a team from outside the so-called Big Six had won the Charity/Community Shield since 1995, when Everton beat Blackburn Rovers.

=== Details ===
7 August 2021
17:15 BST

Leicester City	1–0	Manchester City
Iheanacho 89' (pen.)	Report

Wembley Stadium, London
Attendance: 45,602
Referee: Paul Tierney (Lancashire)

Leicester City	Manchester City

GK	1	(Denmark) Kasper Schmeichel (c)
RB	21	(Portugal) Ricardo Pereira
CB	18	(Ghana) Daniel Amartey
CB	4	(Turkey) Çağlar Söyüncü
LB	5	(England) Ryan Bertrand	(yellow card) 50'	(substituted off) 78'
CM	8	(Belgium) Youri Tielemans		(substituted off) 72'
CM	25	(Nigeria) Wilfred Ndidi
RW	17	(Spain) Ayoze Pérez		(substituted off) 71'
AM	10	(England) James Maddison		(substituted off) 71'
LW	7	(England) Harvey Barnes		(substituted off) 79'
CF	9	(England) Jamie Vardy		(substituted off) 71'
Substitutes:
GK	12	(Wales) Danny Ward
DF	16	(Croatia) Filip Benković
DF	33	(England) Luke Thomas		(substituted on) 78'
MF	11	(England) Marc Albrighton		(substituted on) 71'
MF	20	(Bangladesh) Hamza Choudhury
MF	22	(England) Kiernan Dewsbury-Hall		(substituted on) 71'
MF	42	(France) Boubakary Soumaré		(substituted on) 72'
FW	14	(Nigeria) Kelechi Iheanacho		(substituted on) 79'
FW	29	(Zambia) Patson Daka		(substituted on) 71'
Manager:
(Northern Ireland) Brendan Rodgers

GK	13	(United States) Zack Steffen
RB	27	(Portugal) João Cancelo
CB	3	(Portugal) Rúben Dias	(yellow card) 87'
CB	6	(Netherlands) Nathan Aké
LB	22	(France) Benjamin Mendy
CM	80	(England) Cole Palmer		(substituted off) 74'
CM	25	(Brazil) Fernandinho (c)	(yellow card) 87'
CM	8	(Germany) İlkay Gündoğan		(substituted off) 65'
RF	26	(Algeria) Riyad Mahrez
CF	21	(Spain) Ferran Torres		(substituted off) 74'
LF	53	(England) Samuel Edozie		(substituted off) 65'
Substitutes:
GK	33	(England) Scott Carson
DF	34	(Netherlands) Philippe Sandler
DF	39	(Brazil) Yan Couto
MF	10	(England) Jack Grealish		(substituted on) 65'
MF	16	(Spain) Rodri		(substituted on) 65'
MF	20	(Portugal) Bernardo Silva		(substituted on) 74'
MF	69	(England) Tommy Doyle
MF	81	(France) Claudio Gomes
MF	96	(England) Ben Knight		(substituted on) 74'
Manager:
(Spain) Pep Guardiola			(yellow card) 41'

Man of the Match:
Kelechi Iheanacho (Leicester City)

Assistant referees:
Ian Hussin (Liverpool)
Neil Davies (London)
Fourth official:
Peter Bankes (Liverpool)
Reserve assistant referee:
Nick Hopton (Derbyshire)
Video assistant referee:
Darren England (Sheffield & Hallamshire)
Assistant video assistant referee:
Dan Robathan (Norfolk)

Match rules

- 90 minutes
- Penalty shoot-out if scores still level
- Nine named substitutes, of which six may be used

== Post-match ==
Leicester City boss Brendan Rodgers spoke to BBC Radio Leicester about winning the Community Shield for the first time: "There was a great feeling coming here today. Every Leicester player, fan, staff member coming here, it was a really special feeling. We wanted to take that into the game and keep that feeling going, and thankfully we've done that." Manchester City manager Pep Guardiola congratulated Leicester on their win and said, "I am more than satisfied with how we played. Many things were really good, the young players were excellent. We got minutes for players so in general, many good things." Guardiola gave debuts to academy players Cole Palmer, Samuel Edozie and Ben Knight; Edozie and Palmer started the match and Knight came off the bench to replace Ferran Torres in the 74th minute.

Leicester City started their 2021–22 Premier League campaign with a 1–0 win over Wolverhampton Wanderers at the King Power Stadium, with Jamie Vardy scoring the only goal in the 41st minute, while Manchester City began the defence of their league title at the Tottenham Hotspur Stadium where they faced Tottenham Hotspur; they lost 1–0 to a Son Heung-min goal in the 55th minute, giving new Tottenham Hotspur head coach Nuno Espírito Santo his first win in charge of the club. Manchester City's record signing Jack Grealish made his first start for the club in that match.
