= Hamza Choudhury =

Bangladesh international footballer (born 1997)

- Choudhury with Leicester City in 2025

Personal information
- Full name: Hamza Dewan Choudhury
- Date of birth: 1 October 1997 (age 29)
- Place of birth: Loughborough, England
- Height: 5 ft 10 in (1.78 m)
- Positions: Defensive midfielder; right-back

Team information
- Current team: Sheffield United
- Number: 8

Youth career
- 2005–2015: Leicester City

Senior career*
Years	Team	Apps	(Gls)
2015–2026	Leicester City	123	(1)
2016–2017	→ Burton Albion (loan)	26	(0)
2022–2023	→ Watford (loan)	36	(0)
2025	→ Sheffield United (loan)	16	(0)
2026–	Sheffield United	12	(0)

International career^{‡}
2018–2019	England U21	7	(0)
2025–	Bangladesh	15	(5)
- * Club domestic league appearances and goals as of 21 November 2026 ‡ National team caps and goals as of 18:33, 11 November 2026 (UTC)

Hamza Dewan Choudhury (Bengali: হামজ়া দেওয়ান চৌধুরী, pronounced [hamza dewaːn t͡ʃoud̪ʱuriː]; born 1 October 1997) is a professional footballer who plays as a defensive midfielder or right-back for EFL Championship club Sheffield United. Born in England, and a former English youth international, he plays for the Bangladesh national team.

Choudhury is a product of the Leicester City Academy, joining the club at the age of seven. After signing professionally for Leicester City's first-team in 2015, and gaining professional experience with two loan spells at Burton Albion, he made over 100 senior appearances for Leicester between 2017 and 2026. With Leicester, Choudhury won the FA Cup in 2021, and won the EFL Championship in 2024.

Choudhury has represented England at the under-21 level and, after receiving his Bangladeshi passport in late 2024, made the decision to play for Bangladesh.

== Early life ==
Choudhury was born in Loughborough, Leicestershire, to a Grenadian father and Bangladeshi mother. Choudhury was raised in a traditional Bangladeshi Muslim household by his mother and stepfather and has visited Bangladesh since he was a child. His maternal ancestral home is in Snanghat, Bahubal Upazila, in the Habiganj District of Bangladesh's Sylhet Division.

== Club career ==
=== Leicester City ===
==== Early career ====
Choudhury began his career at the Leicester City Academy, joining the club at the age of 7 in 2005. At the age of 16, Choudhury was reportedly monitored by a number of top European clubs.

==== Loans to Burton Albion ====
Choudhury joined League One leaders Burton Albion on a one-month loan deal on 27 February 2016. He made his debut in the Football League later that same day, coming on as a 77th-minute substitute for Tom Naylor in a 0–0 draw with Walsall at the Pirelli Stadium. On 6 August, Choudhury signed another loan deal with Burton Albion for the 2016–17 season. On the same day, Choudhury featured in Burton Albion's first ever Championship game, claiming an assist in a 4–3 defeat against Nottingham Forest.

==== First-team breakthrough ====
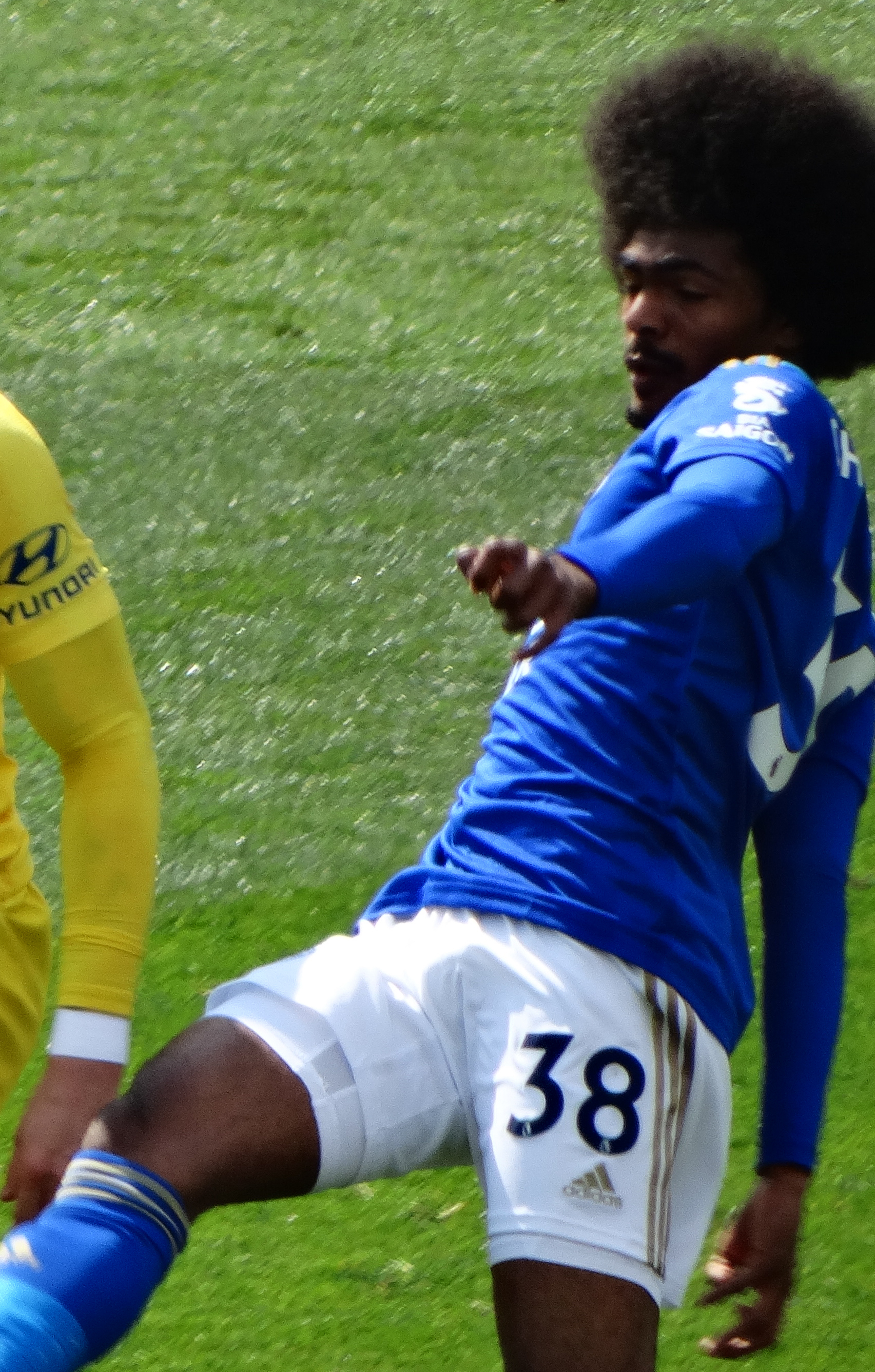
Choudhury playing for Leicester City in 2019

Choudhury made his first-team debut for Leicester City on 19 September 2017, coming on as substitute in a 2–0 win against Liverpool at home in the third round of the EFL Cup. He made his Premier League debut on 28 November as a substitute at home in a 2–1 win against Tottenham Hotspur. His first Premier League start came on 14 April 2018, in a 2–1 away defeat to Burnley.

On 30 August 2019, Choudhury signed a new four-year contract with Leicester. On 1 January 2020, Choudhury scored his first senior goal for Leicester, an outside the box strike in the 86th minute, in a 3–0 away win at Newcastle United.

On 22 October 2020, Choudhury made his first appearance in a European competition, coming off the bench in the 71st minute against Zorya Luhansk. He became the first footballer of Bangladeshi descent to make an appearance in a European competition by doing so. One week later, Choudhury scored a 39th-minute volley against AEK Athens, winning the match 2–1. He became the first footballer of Bangladeshi descent to score in one of the two major UEFA club competitions, the first British Asian to score in European competitions since Michael Chopra in the defunct UEFA Intertoto Cup, and the first British Asian to score in the current UEFA competitions.

On 11 April 2021, Choudhury was one of three players dropped from Leicester's squad for the game against West Ham United after breaching COVID-19 protocols. On 15 May 2021, he came on as an 82nd-minute substitute in the 2021 FA Cup Final, which Leicester won 1–0 for his first career honour.

==== Loan to Watford ====
On 10 August 2022, Choudhury joined Championship club Watford on loan for the season, with the option to make the move permanent the following summer. He made his debut two days later in a 1–0 home win over Burnley, and was praised by manager Rob Edwards.

==== Loan to Sheffield United ====
Choudhury joined Championship club Sheffield United on 27 January 2025 on loan until the end of the 2024–25 season. He appeared in 16 matches before returning to Leicester at the end of the season.

=== Sheffield United ===
On 31 August 2026, Choudhury joined Championship club Sheffield United on a one-year deal for an undisclosed fee. This brought an end to his 21-year association with his boyhood club Leicester City.

== International career ==
=== England ===
On 26 May 2018, Choudhury made his debut for the England national under-21 football team, coming on as a substitute during the 2–1 win against China under-21 in the 2018 Toulon Tournament. Choudhury started for England in the next match of the tournament, a 0–0 draw against Mexico.

On 27 May 2019, Choudhury was included in England's 23-man squad for the 2019 UEFA European Under-21 Championship but was shown a straight red card for a reckless tackle during the second half of the opening 2–1 defeat to France in Cesena.

=== Bangladesh ===
While eligible to represent Bangladesh and Grenada, Choudhury expressed in October 2019 that his goal was to play for England, saying, "To play for England is my biggest dream, to represent the senior team." However, on 27 February 2024, reports confirmed he was in talks to join the Bangladesh national team for their 2026 World Cup qualifiers in March 2024. Choudhury obtained his Bangladeshi passport on 23 August 2024, and on 24 September 2024, the English Football Association issued him a No Objection Certificate (NOC), allowing him to officially represent Bangladesh. He officially switched allegiance to Bangladesh on 19 December 2024.

On 9 February 2025, Hamza was included in the preliminary squad for Bangladesh's 2027 AFC Asian Cup third round qualifier match against India. On 25 March, he made his debut for Bangladesh in a 0–0 draw against India. On 4 June 2025, Choudhury scored his first international goal in a 2–0 friendly win over Bhutan.

== Personal life ==
Choudhury can speak Sylheti with a good degree of fluency. Choudhury is a Sunni Muslim, and attended evening madrasa during his youth. He has stated that before leaving the changing room for a match, he recites parts of the Qur'an in Arabic such as the Throne Verse and various duas.

Choudhury and his wife have three children born in 2018, 2020, and 2023.

After winning in the 2021 FA Cup final, Choudhury and his teammate Wesley Fofana both celebrated draped in the flag of Palestine, during the 2021 Israel–Palestine crisis. In October 2023, Choudhury used the phrase "from the river to the sea" on X in the wake of the Gaza war. The Football Association later wrote to clubs to ask their players not to use the phrase on social media.

In 2024, Choudhury won the Sports Personality of the Year award at the Asian Achievers Awards for his achievements and contribution to professional football in the UK.

In November 2025, Choudhury was appointed as the brand ambassador for the mobile financial service bKash, succeeding actor Afran Nisho.

== Career statistics ==
=== Club ===
As of match played 8 September 2026

Appearances and goals by club, season and competition
Club	Season	League			FA Cup		League Cup		Europe		Other		Total	
Club	Season	Division	Apps	Goals	Apps	Goals	Apps	Goals	Apps	Goals	Apps	Goals	Apps	Goals
Leicester City	2015–16	Premier League	0	0	0	0	0	0	—		—		0	0
Leicester City	2016–17	Premier League	0	0	0	0	0	0	0	0	—		0	0
Leicester City	2017–18	Premier League	8	0	0	0	1	0	—		—		9	0
Leicester City	2018–19	Premier League	9	0	1	0	2	0	—		—		12	0
Leicester City	2019–20	Premier League	20	1	4	0	5	0	—		—		29	1
Leicester City	2020–21	Premier League	10	0	3	0	1	0	8 (Note: Appearances in UEFA Europa League)	1	—		22	1
Leicester City	2021–22	Premier League	6	0	1	0	1	0	4 (Note: One appearance in UEFA Europa League, three appearances in UEFA Europa Conference League)	0	—		12	0
Leicester City	2023–24	Championship	34	0	4	0	3	0	—		—		41	0
Leicester City	2024–25	Premier League	4	0	0	0	2	0	—		—		6	0
Leicester City	2025–26	Championship	30	0	1	0	1	1	—		—		32	1
Leicester City	2026–27	League One	2	0	0	0	1	0	—		0	0	3	0
Leicester City	Total		123	1	14	0	17	1	12	1	0	0	166	3
Burton Albion (loan)	2015–16	League One	13	0	—		—		—		—		13	0
Burton Albion (loan)	2016–17	Championship	13	0	0	0	2	0	—		—		15	0
Watford (loan)	2022–23	Championship	36	0	0	0	1	0	—		—		37	0
Sheffield United (loan)	2024–25	Championship	16	0	—		—		—		3 (Note: Appearances in Championship play-offs)	0	19	0
Sheffield United	2026–27	Championship	3	0	0	0	0	0	—		—		3	0
Sheffield United	Total		19	0	0	0	0	0	0	0	3	0	22	0
Career total			203	1	14	0	20	1	12	1	3	0	252	3

=== International ===
As of match played 11 November 2026

Appearances and goals by national team and year
National team	Year	Apps	Goals
Bangladesh	2025	7	4
Bangladesh	2026	8	1
Total		15	5

Scores and results list Bangladesh's goal tally first.

List of international goals scored by Hamza Choudhury
No.	Date	Venue	Opponent	Score	Result	Competition
1	4 June 2025	National Stadium, Dhaka, Bangladesh	Bhutan	1–0	2–0	Friendly
2	9 October 2025	National Stadium, Dhaka, Bangladesh	Hong Kong	1–0	3–4	2027 AFC Asian Cup qualification
3	13 November 2025	National Stadium, Dhaka, Bangladesh	Nepal	1–1	2–2	Friendly
4	13 November 2025	National Stadium, Dhaka, Bangladesh	Nepal	2–1	2–2	Friendly
5	11 November 2026	National Stadium, Dhaka, Bangladesh	Sri Lanka	2–0	4–0	2026 SAFF Championship

== Honours ==
Burton Albion

- Football League One second-place promotion: 2015–16

Leicester City

- FA Cup: 2020–21
- FA Community Shield: 2021
- EFL Championship: 2023–24

England U21

- Toulon Tournament: 2018

== See also ==
- British Asians in association football
