= Peter McCormick =

British lawyer

Peter McCormick OBE
- Born: Peter David Godfrey McCormick; 27 June 1952 (age 74)
- Occupations: Solicitor; Executive Vice Chairman of Leeds United FC (since 1 May 2025)
- Website: www.mccormicks-solicitors.com

Peter David Godfrey McCormick OBE (born 27 June 1952) is an English lawyer. He is the Founder of McCormicks Solicitors of Harrogate, North Yorkshire, England. Ranked among the country's top sports lawyers, he is best known as Chairman of the Premier League's Legal Advisory Group and Chairman of the League's Football Board. In 2026, he was appointed executive vice chairman for Leeds United.

== Early life and education ==
He was educated at Ashville College and King's College London (LLB, 1973).

== Career ==
McCormick started advising the Premier League in 1996. He was elected chairman of the Legal Advisory Group in November 2008. McCormick first served as acting chairman of the Premier League from March 2014 to June 2015, and again from February 2022 to January 2023. McCormick was with the Premier League until March 2025, when he left to become executive vice chairman of Leeds United.

In May 2016, he became a member of the Football Regulatory Authority (FRA) which is responsible for regulatory, disciplinary and rule-making for football played in England. He was also appointed Chairman of the FA International Committee; and a member of the FA Group Remuneration Committee, the FA Council Membership and Appointments Committee.

In August 2016, he was appointed Chairman of the FA Group Remuneration Committee, serving a six year term, expiring in July 2022. He was also made Chairman of the FA Premier League Medical Care Scheme Ltd, a company providing private health care to 95% of professionals in football in this country.

McCormick was unanimously elected Vice Chairman of the FA in July 2017, serving a five-year term until July 2022.

In November 2018, he was elected Chairman of the Professional Game Board of the FA.

In November 2020, he became interim chairman of the Football Association (FA), replacing Greg Clarke, and served until January 2022, when the new independent Chair took office; he continued as an FA Board Member. He stood down from the FA Board at the end of his term, in July 2023.

In January 2022, he was unanimously appointed by the 20 Premier League Clubs as interim Chairman of the Premier League. He served until January 2023, when the new independent Chair took office.

He has been Chairman of Premier League Stadium Fund and a Trustee of the Football Foundation.

In July 2023, he was elected Chairman of the FA Challenge Cup Committee.

In March 2025, it was announced that he would be leaving the Premier League and FA to take up an unsolicited offer to be the Executive Vice Chairman of Leeds United FC.

He was the inaugural Yorkshire Lawyer of the Year and Niche Practice Lawyer of the Year 2000. In 2008, he received the Lifetime Achievement in Business Award at the Ackrill Media Group Business Awards.

He was the inaugural Chairman of Visit Harrogate, the Destination Management Organisation for business and leisure tourism in the Harrogate district. In April 2017, he was appointed a Harrogate Conference Ambassador for the Harrogate Convention Centre.

He has been Chairman of War Memorials Trust, and is Chairman of the Yorkshire Young Achievers Foundation and a Trustee of the Helen Feather Memorial Trust.

He is a Future 50 Campaign Vice President of Harrogate International Festivals.

== Awards and recognition ==
He was appointed Officer of the Order of the British Empire (OBE) for charitable services in the 2000 New Year Honours. He was awarded the Order of Mercy in July 2016 by the League of Mercy Foundation, for outstanding voluntary service.

He is ranked as a leading expert by the Legal 500 and Chambers UK in Sport, Media and Entertainment, Commercial Litigation, Agriculture and Estates, Charities and Not-for-Profit, Contentious Trusts and Probate, Mediators, Professional Discipline, EU and Competition Law, Employment, Insolvency and Corporate Recovery, Personal Tax, Trusts and Probate, Property Litigation, Commercial Property, Corporate and Commercial and Reputation Management. The Legal 500 ranks him in the Hall of Fame as the UK's leading sports lawyer. Chambers UK ranks him as an Eminent Practitioner for both Agricultural and Rural Affairs and Sport.
