= Ampthill (disambiguation) =

Ampthill is the name of several things around the world.

== Places ==
=== United Kingdom ===
- Ampthill, a town in Bedfordshire, England
- Ampthill Park, an estate in Ampthill, Bedfordshire, England
- Ampthill RUFC, a rugby club in Ampthill, England
- Ampthill Town F.C., a football club in Ampthill, England
- Ampthill Clay, a geologic formation in England
- Ampthill Tunnel, a railway tunnel near Ampthill, England
- Ampthill Rural District, a rural district in Bedfordshire, England that existed from 1894 to 1974
- Ampthill railway station, a railway station near Ampthill, England

=== United States ===
- Ampthill (Chesterfield County, Virginia), an 18th-century plantation in Chesterfield County, Virginia
- Ampthill (Cumberland County, Virginia), an 1830s plantation in Cumberland County, Virginia

== People ==
- Baron Ampthill, a title of peerage in the United Kingdom
