= 2016–17 Leicester City F.C. season =

117th season in existence of Leicester City

Leicester City
2016–17 season
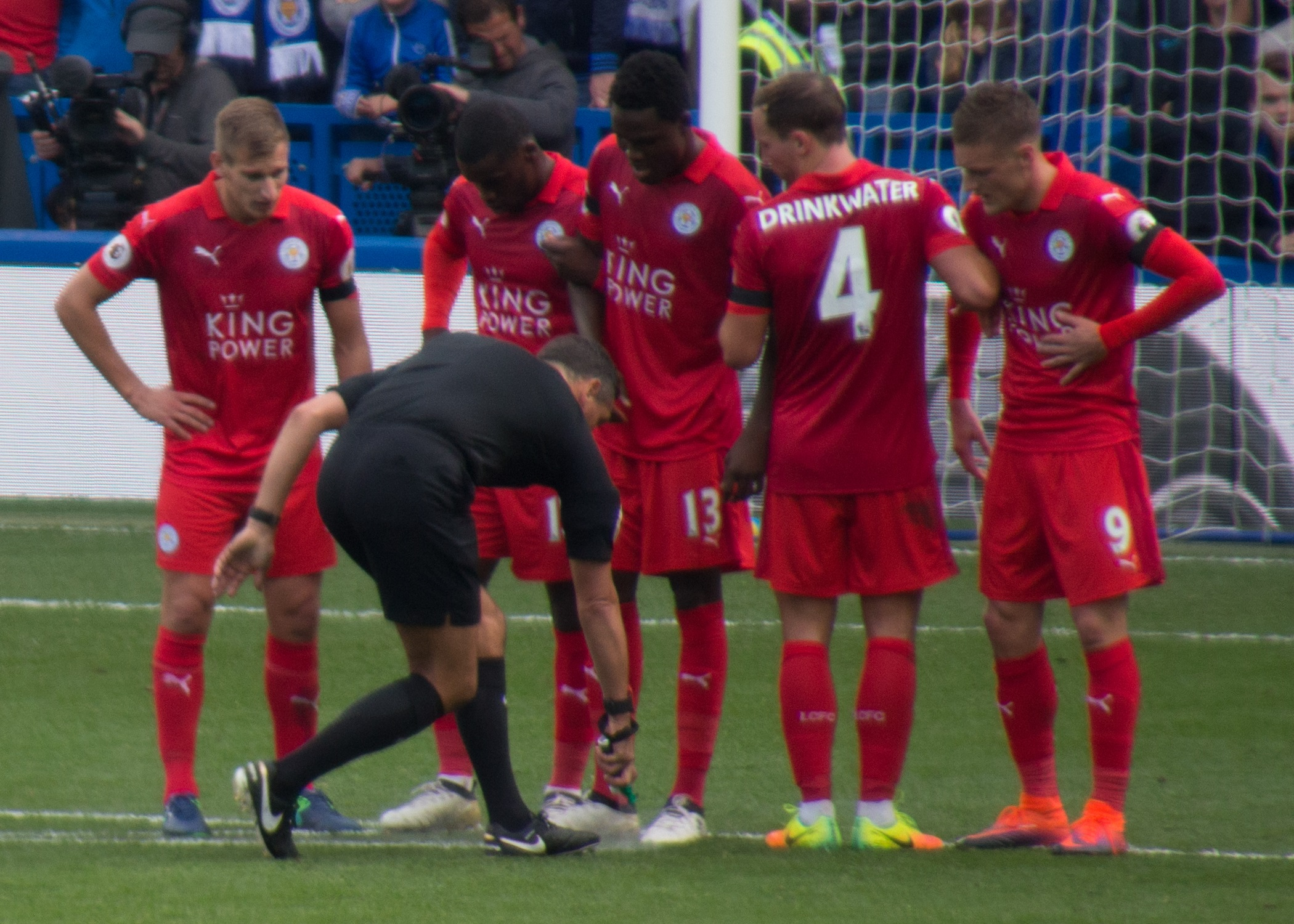
- Leicester City wall defending a Chelsea free-kick, 2016
- Owner: King Power
- Chairman: Vichai Srivaddhanaprabha
- Manager: Claudio Ranieri (until 23 February); Craig Shakespeare (from 23 February)
- Stadium: King Power Stadium
- Premier League: 12th
- FA Cup: Fifth round
- EFL Cup: Third round
- UEFA Champions League: Quarter-finals
- Community Shield: Runners-up
- Top goalscorer: League: Jamie Vardy (13); All: Jamie Vardy (16)
- Highest home attendance: 32,072 vs. Manchester United (5 February 2017)
- Lowest home attendance: 29,899 vs. Chelsea (20 September 2016)
- Average home league attendance: 31,886
Home colours	Away colours	Third colours

The 2016–17 Leicester City season was the club's 112th season in the English football league system and its 49th (non-consecutive) season in the top tier of English football. Leicester City participated in the Premier League for the third consecutive season as well as the FA Cup and EFL Cup. The season covers the period from 1 July 2016 to 30 June 2017. The club also took part in the pre-season FA Community Shield as the reigning Premier League champions, losing to reigning FA Cup winners Manchester United, and entered this season's UEFA Champions League at the group stage, their first ever involvement in the club's history, reaching the quarter-finals, before losing to Atlético Madrid, The club also entered the 2016–17 league season as reigning Premier League champions after winning their first ever Premier League title in the previous season.

== Kit and sponsorship ==
Supplier: Puma / Sponsor: King Power

Home	Home alt. 1	Home alt. 2	Home 2017–18	Away	Third	Third alt.

Goalkeeper 1	Goalkeeper 1 alt.	Goalkeeper 2	Goalkeeper 2 alt.	Goalkeeper 2017–18

== Pre-season events ==
Note: This section does not include close season transfers or pre-season match results, which are listed in their own sections below.

- 27 July 2016 – Jamie Vardy signs a four-year contract extension until June 2020.
- 28 July 2016 – Ben Chilwell signs a five-year contract extension until June 2021.
- 29 July 2016 – Andy King signs a four-year contract extension until June 2020.
- 30 July 2016 – Callum Elder signs a three-year contract extension until June 2019.
- 6 August 2016 – Hamza Choudhury signs a four-year contract extension until June 2020.
- 6 August 2016 – Kasper Schmeichel signs a five-year contract extension until June 2021.

== Pre-season ==
=== Friendlies ===
Win Draw Loss Postponed

19 July 2016 Friendly	Oxford United	1–2	Leicester City	Oxford
19:45 BST	Maguire 10'	Report	Gray 28'; Schlupp 69'	Stadium: Kassam Stadium; Attendance: 9,487; Referee: John Busby

=== International Champions Cup ===
Win Draw Loss Postponed

23 July 2016 ICC	Celtic	1–1 (5–6 p)	Leicester City	Glasgow, Scotland
17:30 BST	O'Connell 59'	Report	Mahrez 46'	Stadium: Celtic Park; Attendance: 32,658; Referee: John Beaton (Scotland)
	Penalties
	Çiftçi (penalty scored); Johansen (penalty scored); Allan (penalty scored); O'Connell (penalty scored); Christie (penalty scored); Forrest (penalty missed)		(penalty scored) Fuchs; (penalty scored) Wasilewski; (penalty scored) Drinkwater; (penalty scored) Chilwell; (penalty scored) Okazaki; (penalty scored) Amartey

30 July 2016 ICC	Paris Saint-Germain	4–0	Leicester City	Carson, California, United States
20:03 PDT	Cavani 26' (pen.); Ikoné 45'; Lucas 65'; Édouard 90'	Report	Hernández (yellow card) 9'	Stadium: StubHub Center; Attendance: 25,667; Referee: Ismail Elfath (United States)

3 August 2016 ICC	Barcelona	4–2	Leicester City	Stockholm, Sweden
20:00 CEST	Munir 26', 45'; L. Suárez 34'; D. Suárez (yellow card) 38'; Mújica 84'	Report	Musa 47', 66'	Stadium: Friends Arena; Attendance: 42,879; Referee: Martin Strömbergsson (Sweden)

== Events ==
Note:This section does not include transfers or match results, which are listed in their own sections below.

- 10 August 2016 – Claudio Ranieri signs a four-year contract extension until June 2020.
- 17 August 2016 – Riyad Mahrez signs a four-year contract extension until June 2020.
- 25 August 2016 – Danny Drinkwater signs a five-year contract extension until June 2021.
- 9 June 2017 – Alex Pașcanu signs a two-year contract extension until June 2019.
- 9 June 2017 – Kiernan Dewsbury-Hall signs a two-year contract extension until June 2019.

== Players and staff ==
=== First-team squad ===
- This section lists players who were in Leicester's first-team at any point during the 2016–17 season
- Asterisks indicates player left mid-season
- Hash symbol indicates player retired mid-season
- Italics indicate loan player

No.	Nationality	Name	Position	Joined	Signed from
Goalkeepers
1	(Denmark)	Kasper Schmeichel	GK	2011	(England) Leeds United
12	(England)	Ben Hamer	GK	2014	(England) Charlton Athletic
21	(Germany)	Ron-Robert Zieler	GK	2016	(Germany) Hannover 96
Defenders
2	(Spain)	Luis Hernández*	CB / RB	2016	(Spain) Sporting Gijón
3	(England)	Ben Chilwell	LB / LM	2015	Youth
5	(Jamaica)	Wes Morgan	CB	2012	(England) Nottingham Forest
6	(Germany)	Robert Huth	CB	2015	(England) Stoke City
15	(Ghana)	Jeffrey Schlupp*	LB / LW / LM / CF	2010	Youth
17	(England)	Danny Simpson	RB	2014	(England) Queens Park Rangers
18	(Mali)	Molla Wagué	CB	2017	(Italy) Udinese
27	(Poland)	Marcin Wasilewski	CB / RB	2013	(Belgium) Anderlecht
28	(Austria)	Christian Fuchs	LB	2015	(Germany) Schalke 04
29	(Tunisia)	Yohan Benalouane	CB	2015	(Italy) Atalanta
Midfielders
4	(England)	Danny Drinkwater	CM	2012	(England) Manchester United
8	(England)	Matty James	CM	2012	(England) Manchester United
10	(Wales)	Andy King	CM	2006	Youth
11	(England)	Marc Albrighton	RM / LM	2014	(England) Aston Villa
13	(Ghana)	Daniel Amartey	CM / CB / RB / DM	2016	(Denmark) Copenhagen
14	(Poland)	Bartosz Kapustka	LW / RW / AM	2016	(Poland) Cracovia
22	(England)	Demarai Gray	LW / RW	2016	(England) Birmingham City
24	(France)	Nampalys Mendy	DM	2016	(France) Nice
25	(Nigeria)	Wilfred Ndidi	DM	2017	(Belgium) Genk
26	(Algeria)	Riyad Mahrez	LW / RW / AM	2014	(France) Le Havre
39	(England)	Harvey Barnes	AM / CM / RM / LM	2016	Youth
Forwards
7	(Nigeria)	Ahmed Musa	CF / LW	2016	(Russia) CSKA Moscow
9	(England)	Jamie Vardy	CF	2012	(England) Fleetwood Town
19	(Algeria)	Islam Slimani	CF	2016	(Portugal) Sporting CP
20	(Japan)	Shinji Okazaki	CF / LW / RW / AM	2015	(Germany) Mainz 05
23	(Argentina)	Leonardo Ulloa	CF	2014	(England) Brighton & Hove Albion

=== Backroom staff ===
- This section lists members of staff who were in Leicester's first team squad at any point during the 2016–17 season
- Asterisks indicate member of staff left mid-season

Position	Nationality	Name
Manager	(England)	Craig Shakespeare*
First Team Coach/Goalkeeping Coach	(England)	Mike Stowell
Head physio	(England)	David Rennie
Academy manager		Vacant
Academy coach (Under 18s)	(England)	Trevor Peake

== Transfers ==
=== Transfers in ===
Date	Position	Nationality	Name	From	Fee	Ref.
1 July 2016	GK	GER	Ron-Robert Zieler	Hannover 96	Undisclosed	
1 July 2016	CB	ESP	Luis Hernández	Sporting Gijón	Free transfer	
1 July 2016	CF	ESP	Raúl Uche	Rayo Vallecano	Undisclosed	
3 July 2016	DM	FRA	Nampalys Mendy	Nice	£13,000,000	
8 July 2016	CF	NGA	Ahmed Musa	CSKA Moscow	£16,000,000	
3 August 2016	LW	POL	Bartosz Kapustka	Cracovia	£2,500,000	
31 August 2016	ST	ALG	Islam Slimani	Sporting CP	£28,000,000	
1 September 2016	AM	IRL	Dylan Watts	University College Dublin	Undisclosed	
30 September 2016	LB	NGA	Josh Debayo	Free agent	Free transfer	
3 January 2017	DM	NGA	Wilfred Ndidi	Genk	£17,000,000	
10 April 2017	ST	ENG	Josh Gordon	Stafford Rangers	Undisclosed	

=== Transfers out ===
Date	Position	Nationality	Name	To	Fee	Ref.
1 July 2016	CF	CRO	Andrej Kramarić	1899 Hoffenheim	Undisclosed	
1 July 2016	LB	ENG	Elliot Percival	Sheffield Wednesday	£950,000	
16 July 2016	CM	FRA	N'Golo Kanté	Chelsea	£32,000,000	
20 August 2016	CB	ENG	Liam Moore	Reading	Undisclosed	
23 August 2016	RB	BEL	Ritchie De Laet	Aston Villa	Undisclosed	
31 August 2016	CM	SUI	Gökhan Inler	Beşiktaş	Free transfer	
13 January 2017	LB	GHA	Jeffrey Schlupp	Crystal Palace	£12,000,000	
24 January 2017	RB	ESP	Luis Hernández	Málaga	Undisclosed	

=== Loans in ===
Date from	Date until	Position	Nationality	Name	From
31 January 2017	End of Season	CB	MLI	Molla Wagué	Udinese

=== Loans out ===
Date from	Date until	Position	Nationality	Name	To
30 July 2016	31 January 2017	LB	AUS	Callum Elder	Brentford (Note: On 31 January 2017, Callum Elder's loan at Brentford was terminated.)
5 August 2016	End of Season	CM	ENG	Michael Cain	Blackpool
6 August 2016	End of Season	DM	ENG	Hamza Choudhury	Burton Albion
30 August 2016	End of Season	SS	WAL	Tom Lawrence	Ipswich Town
20 January 2017	End of Season	AM	ENG	Harvey Barnes	Milton Keynes Dons
25 January 2017	End of Season	CM	ENG	Matty James	Barnsley
31 January 2017	End of Season	LB	AUS	Callum Elder	Barnsley

=== Released ===
Date	Position	Nationality	Name	Subsequent club
30 June 2016	CB	NIR	Conor Anderson	
30 June 2016	AM	ENG	Kyle Bailey	
30 June 2016	LW	ENG	Jack Barmby	Portland Timbers
30 June 2016	FW	ENG	Jacob Blyth	Motherwell
30 June 2016	CM	ENG	Dean Hammond	Sheffield United
30 June 2016	RW	WAL	Aaron Hassall	
30 June 2016	LB	ENG	Michael Kelly	Hurlford United
30 June 2016	FW	ENG	Keenan King	Hayes & Yeading
30 June 2016	LB	ENG	Paul Konchesky	Gillingham
30 June 2016	GK	ENG	Jonny Maddison	Yeovil Town
30 June 2016	SS	SKN	Harry Panayiotou	Barrow
30 June 2016	GK	AUS	Mark Schwarzer	
30 June 2016	GK	ENG	Max Smith-Varnam	
30 June 2016	CM	ENG	Ryan Watson	Barnet
30 June 2016	RW	GHA	Joe Dodoo	Rangers

== Competitions ==
Win Draw Loss

=== Overview ===
Competition	First match	Last match	Starting round	Final position	Record							
Competition	First match	Last match	Starting round	Final position	Pld	W	D	L	GF	GA	GD	Win %
Premier League	13 August 2016	21 May 2017	Matchday 1	12th	38	12	8	18	48	63	−15	31.58
FA Cup	7 January 2017	18 February 2017	Third round	Fifth round	4	2	1	1	7	5	+2	50.00
EFL Cup	20 September 2016	20 September 2016	Third round	Third round	1	0	0	1	2	4	−2	0.00
Champions League	14 September 2016	18 April 2017	Group stage	Quarter-finals	10	5	2	3	11	10	+1	50.00
FA Community Shield	7 August 2016		Final	Runners-up	1	0	0	1	1	2	−1	0.00
Total					54	19	11	24	69	84	−15	35.19

Last updated: 21 May 2017
Source: Soccerway

=== FA Community Shield ===
7 August 2016 Community Shield	Leicester City	1–2	Manchester United	London
16:00	Simpson (yellow card) 40'; Vardy 52', (yellow card) 75'; King (yellow card) 55'	Report	Lingard 32'; Bailly (yellow card) 71'; Ibrahimović 83'	Stadium: Wembley Stadium; Attendance: 85,437; Referee: Craig Pawson

=== Premier League ===
==== League table ====
Pos	Team	Pld	W	D	L	GF	GA	GD	Pts
10	West Bromwich Albion	38	12	9	17	43	51	−8	45
11	West Ham United	38	12	9	17	47	64	−17	45
12	Leicester City	38	12	8	18	48	63	−15	44
13	Stoke City	38	11	11	16	41	56	−15	44
14	Crystal Palace	38	12	5	21	50	63	−13	41

Source: Premier League
Rules for classification: 1) Points; 2) Goal difference; 3) Goals scored; 4) Play-offs (only if needed to decide champion, teams for relegation or teams for UEFA competitions).

==== Results summary ====
Overall								Home						Away					
Pld	W	D	L	GF	GA	GD	Pts	W	D	L	GF	GA	GD	W	D	L	GF	GA	GD
38	12	8	18	47	63	−16	44	10	4	5	29	26	+3	2	4	13	18	37	−19

Last updated: 21 May 2017.
Source: Premier League

==== Results by matchday ====
Matchday	1	2	3	4	5	6	7	8	9	10	11	12	13	14	15	16	17	18	19	20	21	22	23	24	25	26	27	28	29	30	31	32	33	34	35	36	37	38
Ground	A	H	H	A	H	A	H	A	H	A	H	A	H	A	H	A	A	H	H	A	H	A	A	H	A	H	H	A	H	H	A	A	A	A	H	A	H	H
Result	L	D	W	L	W	L	D	L	W	D	L	L	D	L	W	L	D	L	W	D	L	L	L	L	L	W	W	W	W	W	L	D	L	W	W	L	L	D
Position	17	14	9	15	9	11	12	13	12	10	14	14	13	15	14	14	15	16	15	14	15	15	16	16	17	15	15	15	13	10	11	12	15	11	9	11	11	12

Updated to match(es) played on 21 May 2017. Source: Statto.com
A = Away; H = Home; W = Win; D = Draw; L = Loss

==== Matches ====
On 15 June 2016, the fixtures for the forthcoming season were announced.

13 August 2016 1	Hull City	2–1	Leicester City	Kingston upon Hull
12:30 BST	Diomande 45+1'; Snodgrass 57'; Davies (yellow card) 71'; Clucas (yellow card) 83'	Report	Fuchs (yellow card) 29'; Simpson (yellow card) 33'; Mahrez 47' (pen.)	Stadium: KC Stadium; Attendance: 21,037; Referee: Mike Dean

20 August 2016 2	Leicester City	0–0	Arsenal	Leicester
17:30 BST	Mendy (yellow card) 45'	Report	Coquelin (yellow card) 24'; Holding (yellow card) 90'	Stadium: King Power Stadium; Attendance: 32,008; Referee: Mark Clattenburg

27 August 2016 3	Leicester City	2–1	Swansea City	Leicester
15:00 BST	Huth (yellow card) 26'; Vardy 32'; Morgan 52'; Simpson (yellow card) 70'	Report	Fernández (yellow card) 10'; Fer (yellow card) 66', (goal) 80'	Stadium: King Power Stadium; Attendance: 31,727; Referee: Roger East

10 September 2016 4	Liverpool	4–1	Leicester City	Liverpool
17:30 BST	Firmino 13', 89'; Mané 31'; Henderson (yellow card) 44'; Lallana 56'	Report	Amartey (yellow card) 28'; Vardy 38'; Huth (yellow card) 82'	Stadium: Anfield; Attendance: 51,232; Referee: Craig Pawson

17 September 2016 5	Leicester City	3–0	Burnley	Leicester
15:00 BST	Slimani 45+1', 48'; Mee 78' (o.g.)	Report	Lowton (yellow card) 88'	Stadium: King Power Stadium; Attendance: 31,916; Referee: Anthony Taylor

24 September 2016 6	Manchester United	4–1	Leicester City	Manchester
12:30 BST	Smalling 22'; Mata 37'; Rashford 40'; Pogba 42'	Report	Huth (yellow card) 50'; Gray 59'; Simpson (yellow card) 74'	Stadium: Old Trafford; Attendance: 75,256; Referee: Mike Dean

2 October 2016 7	Leicester City	0–0	Southampton	Leicester
14:15 BST	Mahrez (yellow card) 54'	Report		Stadium: King Power Stadium; Attendance: 31,563; Referee: Martin Atkinson

15 October 2016 8	Chelsea	3–0	Leicester City	Fulham
12:30 BST	Costa 7'; Hazard 33'; Azpilicueta (yellow card) 51'; Moses 80'	Report	Huth (yellow card) 27'	Stadium: Stamford Bridge; Attendance: 41,547; Referee: Andre Marriner

22 October 2016 9	Leicester City	3–1	Crystal Palace	Leicester
15:00 BST	Musa 42'; Okazaki 63'; Fuchs 80'	Report	Cabaye 85'	Stadium: King Power Stadium; Attendance: 31,969; Referee: Michael Oliver

29 October 2016 10	Tottenham Hotspur	1–1	Leicester City	London
15:00 BST	Rose (yellow card) 37'; Son (yellow card) 41'; Janssen 44' (pen.); Wanyama (yellow card) 67'	Report	Musa 48', (yellow card) 63'; Mahrez (yellow card) 54'; Vardy (yellow card) 65'; Simpson (yellow card) 88'	Stadium: White Hart Lane; Attendance: 31,868; Referee: Robert Madley

6 November 2016 11	Leicester City	1–2	West Bromwich Albion	Leicester
16:30 GMT	Slimani 55'	Report	Morrison 52'; Phillips 72'; Gardner (yellow card) 87'; Brunt (yellow card) 90'	Stadium: King Power Stadium; Attendance: 31,879; Referee: Craig Pawson

19 November 2016 12	Watford	2–1	Leicester City	Watford
15:00 GMT	Capoue 1'; Pereyra 12'; Zúñiga (yellow card) 21'; Britos (yellow card) 32'	Report	Mahrez 15' (pen.); Fuchs (yellow card) 53'; Drinkwater (yellow card) 65'; Gray (yellow card) 81'	Stadium: Vicarage Road; Attendance: 20,640; Referee: Neil Swarbrick

26 November 2016 13	Leicester City	2–2	Middlesbrough	Leicester
15:00 GMT	Albrighton (yellow card) 29'; Mahrez 34' (pen.); Fuchs (yellow card) 37'; Amartey (yellow card) 51'; Vardy (yellow card) 65'; Slimani 90+4' (pen.)	Report	Negredo 12', 70', (yellow card) 34'; Chambers (yellow card) 31'; Valdés (yellow card) 90'; Stuani (yellow card) 90'	Stadium: King Power Stadium; Attendance: 32,058; Referee: Lee Mason

3 December 2016 14	Sunderland	2–1	Leicester City	Sunderland
15:00 GMT	Huth 64' (o.g.); Van Aanholt (yellow card) 68'; Larsson (yellow card) 72'; Defoe 77'; Djilobodji (yellow card) 78'	Report	Okazaki 80'; Fuchs (yellow card) 81'	Stadium: Stadium of Light; Attendance: 39,725; Referee: Andre Marriner

10 December 2016 15	Leicester City	4–2	Manchester City	Leicester
17:30 GMT	Vardy 3', 20', 78'; King 5'; Simpson (yellow card) 19'; Mahrez (yellow card) 57'; Okazaki (yellow card) 90+2'	Report	Fernando (yellow card) 67'; Kolarov 82'; Nolito 90'	Stadium: King Power Stadium; Attendance: 31,966; Referee: Michael Oliver

13 December 2016 16	Bournemouth	1–0	Leicester City	Bournemouth
19:45 GMT	Pugh 34'	Report	King (yellow card) 36'; Morgan (yellow card) 83'; Hernández (yellow card) 87'	Stadium: Dean Court; Attendance: 11,068; Referee: Paul Tierney

17 December 2016 17	Stoke City	2–2	Leicester City	Stoke-on-Trent
15:00 GMT	Bojan 39' (pen.); Allen 45+3'; Johnson (yellow card) 48'; Pieters (yellow card) 67'	Report	Vardy (red card) 28'; Simpson (yellow card) 38'; King (yellow card) 43'; Slimani (yellow card) 43'; Fuchs (yellow card) 45+1'; Albrighton (yellow card) 45+2'; Huth (yellow card) 48'; Ulloa 74'; Amartey 88'	Stadium: Bet365 Stadium; Attendance: 27,663; Referee: Craig Pawson

26 December 2016 18	Leicester City	0–2	Everton	Leicester
15:00 GMT	Simpson (yellow card) 79'; Drinkwater (yellow card) 85'	Report	Mirallas 51'; Lukaku 90'	Stadium: King Power Stadium; Attendance: 31,985; Referee: Stuart Attwell

31 December 2016 19	Leicester City	1–0	West Ham United	Leicester
15:00 GMT	Slimani 20'; Huth (yellow card) 44'; Amartey (yellow card) 47'; Albrighton (yellow card) 66'; Schmeichel (yellow card) 72'; Simpson (yellow card) 83'	Report	Ogbonna (yellow card) 45'; Nordtveit (yellow card) 45'; Lanzini (yellow card) 84'	Stadium: King Power Stadium; Attendance: 32,060; Referee: Anthony Taylor

2 January 2017 20	Middlesbrough	0–0	Leicester City	Middlesbrough
12:30 GMT	Ramírez (yellow card) 26'; Gibson (yellow card) 43'; Clayton (yellow card) 90+2'	Report		Stadium: Riverside Stadium; Attendance: 32,437; Referee: Robert Madley

14 January 2017 21	Leicester City	0–3	Chelsea	Leicester
17:30 GMT	Fuchs (yellow card) 51'	Report	Alonso 6', 51'; Pedro 71'	Stadium: King Power Stadium; Attendance: 32,066; Referee: Andre Marriner

22 January 2017 22	Southampton	3–0	Leicester City	Southampton
12:00 GMT	Ward-Prowse 26'; Rodriguez 39'; Tadić 85' (pen.)	Report	Morgan (yellow card) 84'	Stadium: St Mary's Stadium; Attendance: 30,548; Referee: Michael Oliver

31 January 2017 23	Burnley	1–0	Leicester City	Burnley
15:00 GMT	Lowton (yellow card) 43'; Vokes 87'	Report		Stadium: Turf Moor; Attendance: 19,202; Referee: Mike Dean

5 February 2017 24	Leicester City	0–3	Manchester United	Leicester
16:00 GMT	Drinkwater (yellow card) 5'; Fuchs (yellow card) 40'	Report	Mata (yellow card) 28', (goal) 49'; Mkhitaryan 42'; Ibrahimović 44'; Herrera (yellow card) 55'; Pogba (yellow card) 56'; De Gea (yellow card) 88'	Stadium: King Power Stadium; Attendance: 32,072; Referee: Anthony Taylor

12 February 2017 25	Swansea City	2–0	Leicester City	Swansea
16:00 GMT	Fer (yellow card) 25'; Mawson 35'; Cork (yellow card) 38'; Olsson 45+1'	Report	Huth (yellow card) 35'; Chilwell (yellow card) 56'	Stadium: Liberty Stadium; Attendance: 20,391; Referee: Jonathan Moss

27 February 2017 26	Leicester City	3–1	Liverpool	Leicester
20:00 GMT	Vardy 28', 60'; Drinkwater 39'	Report	Coutinho 68'	Stadium: King Power Stadium; Attendance: 32,034; Referee: Michael Oliver

4 March 2017 27	Leicester City	3–1	Hull City	Leicester
15:00 GMT	Fuchs 27'; Drinkwater (yellow card) 49'; Mahrez 59'; Huddlestone 90' (o.g.)	Report	Clucas 14'; Huddlestone (yellow card) 89'	Stadium: King Power Stadium; Attendance: 31,971; Referee: Mike Dean

18 March 2017 28	West Ham United	2–3	Leicester City	Stratford
15:00 GMT	Lanzini 20'; Ayew 63'	Report	Mahrez 5'; Huth 7'; Vardy 38'; Drinkwater (yellow card) 56'	Stadium: London Stadium; Attendance: 56,979; Referee: Roger East

1 April 2017 29	Leicester City	2–0	Stoke City	Leicester
15:00 BST	Ndidi 25'; Vardy 47'; Fuchs (yellow card) 60'	Report	Shawcross (yellow card) 16'; Whelan (yellow card) 29'; Crouch (yellow card) 69'; Arnautović (yellow card) 90+5'	Stadium: King Power Stadium; Attendance: 31,958; Referee: Lee Mason

4 April 2017 30	Leicester City	2–0	Sunderland	Leicester
19:45 GMT	Slimani 69'; Vardy 78'	Report	Cattermole (yellow card) 35'	Stadium: King Power Stadium; Attendance: 21,757; Referee: Graham Scott

9 April 2017 31	Everton	4–2	Leicester City	Liverpool
16:00 BST	Davies 1'; Lukaku 22', 56'; Mirallas (yellow card) 28'; Jagielka 40'; Baines (yellow card) 44'	Report	Slimani 3'; Albrighton 9'; Huth (yellow card) 28'; King (yellow card) 63'	Stadium: Goodison Park; Attendance: 39,573; Referee: Bobby Madley

15 April 2017 32	Crystal Palace	2–2	Leicester City	Selhurst
15:00 BST	Cabaye 54'; C. Benteke 70'	Report	Huth 6'; Simpson (yellow card) 34'; Vardy 52'; King (yellow card) 63'	Stadium: Selhurst Park; Attendance: 25,504; Referee: Mike Dean

26 April 2017 33	Arsenal	1–0	Leicester City	Holloway, London
19:45 BST	Xhaka (yellow card) 82'; Huth 86' (o.g.); Sánchez (yellow card) 90+3'	Report	Simpson (yellow card) 38'; Fuchs (yellow card) 52'; Benalouane (yellow card) 80'; Huth (yellow card) 90+4'	Stadium: Emirates Stadium; Attendance: 59,829; Referee: Mike Jones

29 April 2017 34	West Bromwich Albion	0–1	Leicester City	West Bromwich
15:00 BST	Yacob (yellow card) 22'; Morrison (yellow card) 66'	Report	Drinkwater (yellow card) 16'; Vardy 43'; Benalouane (yellow card) 52'	Stadium: The Hawthorns; Attendance: 24,611; Referee: Mark Clattenburg

6 May 2017 35	Leicester City	3–0	Watford	Leicester
15:00 BST	Ndidi 38'; Mahrez 58'; Albrighton 90+2'	Report		Stadium: King Power Stadium; Attendance: 31,628; Referee: Roger East

13 May 2017 36	Manchester City	2–1	Leicester City	Manchester
12:30 BST	Silva 29', (yellow card) 90+8'; Gabriel Jesus 36' (pen.); Kompany (yellow card) 50'; Agüero (yellow card) 84'	Report	Benalouane (yellow card) 35'; Okazaki 42'; Fuchs (yellow card) 72'; Albrighton (yellow card) 80'	Stadium: Etihad Stadium; Attendance: 54,407; Referee: Bobby Madley

18 May 2017 37	Leicester City	1–6	Tottenham Hotspur	Leicester
19:45 BST	Chilwell 58'; Albrighton (yellow card) 65'; Gray (yellow card) 74'; Simpson (yellow card) 80'	Report	Kane 24', 62', 88', 90+1'; Son 35', 70'; Sissoko (yellow card) 65'	Stadium: King Power Stadium; Attendance: 31,351; Referee: Michael Oliver

21 May 2017 38	Leicester City	1–1	Bournemouth	Leicester
15:00 BST	Benalouane (yellow card) 45+1'; Vardy 51'; Simpson (yellow card) 57'; Mahrez (yellow card) 84'; Chilwell (yellow card) 90'	Report	Stanislas 1'; Francis (yellow card) 75'	Stadium: King Power Stadium; Attendance: 32,000; Referee: Lee Mason

=== FA Cup ===
7 January 2017 Third round	Everton	1–2	Leicester City	Liverpool
15:00 GMT	Lukaku 63'; Funes Mori (yellow card) 81'	Report	Musa 66', 71'; Kapustka (yellow card) 89'	Stadium: Goodison Park; Attendance: 35,493; Referee: Martin Atkinson

27 January 2017 Fourth round	Derby County	2–2	Leicester City	Derby
19:55 GMT	Bent 20'; Bryson 39'; Pearce (yellow card) 54'	Report	Bent 7' (o.g.); Morgan 85'	Stadium: Pride Park Stadium; Attendance: 25,079; Referee: Mark Clattenburg

8 February 2017 Fourth round replay	Leicester City	3–1 (a.e.t.)	Derby County	Leicester
19:45 GMT	Mendy (yellow card) 9'; King 46'; Musa (yellow card) 84'; Ndidi 95'; Gray 114'	Report	Christie (yellow card) 5'; Camara 62'	Stadium: King Power Stadium; Attendance: 31,648; Referee: Mike Jones

18 February 2017 Fifth round	Millwall	1–0	Leicester City	Bermondsey
15:00 GMT	Cooper (yellow card) 45' (yellow-red card) 52'; Cummings 90'	Report	Zieler (yellow card) 54'	Stadium: The Den; Attendance: 18,012; Referee: Craig Pawson

=== EFL Cup ===
20 September 2016 Third round	Leicester City	2–4 (a.e.t.)	Chelsea	Leicester
19:45	Okazaki 17', 34'; Wasilewski (yellow card) 52' (yellow-red card) 89'; Drinkwater (yellow card) 87'; Chilwell (yellow card) 103'	Report	Cahill 45'; Azpilicueta 49'; Matić (yellow card) 83'; Fàbregas 92', 94'; David Luiz (yellow card) 109'	Stadium: King Power Stadium; Attendance: 29,899; Referee: Robert Madley

=== UEFA Champions League ===
Leicester City qualified for the group stage of the 2016–17 UEFA Champions League by winning the 2015–16 Premier League. It was their first participation in this competition. As champions of England, the club was in Pot 1 for the group stage draw.

==== Group stage ====
Pos	Team	Pld	W	D	L	GF	GA	GD	Pts	Qualification	LEI	POR	CPH	BRU
1	(England) Leicester City	6	4	1	1	7	6	+1	13	Advance to knockout phase	—	1–0	1–0	2–1
2	(Portugal) Porto	6	3	2	1	9	3	+6	11	Advance to knockout phase	5–0	—	1–1	1–0
3	(Denmark) Copenhagen	6	2	3	1	7	2	+5	9	Transfer to Europa League	0–0	0–0	—	4–0
4	(Belgium) Club Brugge	6	0	0	6	2	14	−12	0		0–3	1–2	0–2	—

Source: UEFA

14 September 2016 1	Club Brugge (Belgium)	0–3	(England) Leicester City	Bruges, Belgium
20:45	Simons (yellow card) 28'; Engels (yellow card) 35'; Butelle (yellow card) 60'; Vormer (yellow card) 90+3'	Report	Albrighton 5'; Mahrez 29', 61' (pen.); Slimani (yellow card) 48'; Ulloa (yellow card) 90'	Stadium: Jan Breydel Stadium; Attendance: 20,970; Referee: Anastasios Sidiropoulos (Greece)

27 September 2016 2	Leicester City (England)	1–0	(Portugal) Porto	Leicester
19:45 BST	Vardy (yellow card) 24'; Slimani 25', (yellow card) 32'; Huth (yellow card) 54'	Report	Felipe (yellow card) 21'; Silva (yellow card) 23'; D. Pereira (yellow card) 49'	Stadium: King Power Stadium; Attendance: 31,805; Referee: Cüneyt Çakır (Turkey)

18 October 2016 3	Leicester City (England)	1–0	(Denmark) Copenhagen	Leicester
19:45 BST	Mahrez 40'; Fuchs (yellow card) 79'	Report	Jørgensen (yellow card) 87'	Stadium: King Power Stadium; Attendance: 31,037; Referee: Nicola Rizzoli (Italy)

2 November 2016 4	Copenhagen (Denmark)	0–0	(England) Leicester City	Copenhagen, Denmark
20:45		Report	Drinkwater (yellow card) 22'; Huth (yellow card) 24'; Hernández (yellow card) 42'; Morgan (yellow card) 78'	Stadium: Parken Stadium; Attendance: 34,146; Referee: Felix Brych (Germany)

22 November 2016 5	Leicester City (England)	2–1	(Belgium) Club Brugge	Leicester
19:45 GMT	Okazaki 4'; Mahrez 29' (pen.); Zieler (yellow card) 89'	Report	Izquierdo 52'	Stadium: King Power Stadium; Attendance: 31,443; Referee: Ruddy Buquet (France)

7 December 2016 6	Porto (Portugal)	5–0	(England) Leicester City	Porto, Portugal
19:45	Silva 6', 64' (pen.); Corona 26'; Brahimi 44'; Jota 77'	Report	Chilwell (yellow card) 38'	Stadium: Estádio do Dragão; Attendance: 39,310; Referee: Felix Zwayer (Germany)

==== Knockout phase ====
===== Round of 16 =====
22 February 2017 First leg	Sevilla (Spain)	2–1	(England) Leicester City	Seville, Spain
19:45 GMT	Sarabia 25'; Correa 62'; Escudero (yellow card) 77'; Carriço (yellow card) 90+2'	Report	Vardy 73'	Stadium: Ramón Sánchez Pizjuán Stadium; Attendance: 38,834; Referee: Clément Turpin (France)

14 March 2017 Second leg	Leicester City (England)	2–0 (3–2 agg.)	(Spain) Sevilla	Leicester, England
19:45 GMT	Morgan 27'; Albrighton 54'; Vardy (yellow card) 74'; Schmeichel (yellow card) 79'; Ndidi (yellow card) 84'; Mahrez (yellow card) 89'	Report	Nasri (yellow card) 18' (yellow-red card) 74'; Vitolo (yellow card) 59'	Stadium: King Power Stadium; Attendance: 31,520; Referee: Daniele Orsato (Italy)

===== Quarter-finals =====
12 April 2017 First leg	Atlético Madrid (Spain)	1–0	(England) Leicester City	Madrid, Spain
19:45 BST	Griezmann 28' (pen.)	Report	Albrighton (yellow card) 28'; Benalouane (yellow card) 49'; Huth (yellow card) 58'	Stadium: Vicente Calderón; Attendance: 51,423; Referee: Jonas Eriksson (Sweden)

18 April 2017 Second leg	Leicester City (England)	1–1 (1–2 agg.)	(Spain) Atlético Madrid	Leicester
19:45 BST	Vardy 60'	Report	Saúl 25'	Stadium: King Power Stadium; Attendance: 31,548; Referee: Gianluca Rocchi (Italy)

== Statistics ==
=== Squad statistics ===
No.	Pos	Nat	Player	Total		Premier League		FA Cup		League Cup		FA Community Shield		Champions League	
No.	Pos	Nat	Player	Apps	Goals	Apps	Goals	Apps	Goals	Apps	Goals	Apps	Goals	Apps	Goals
1	GK	(Denmark)	Kasper Schmeichel	41	0	30	0	2	0	0	0	1	0	8	0
2	DF	(Spain)	Luis Hernández*	9	0	3+1	0	0	0	0	0	0+1	0	4	0
3	DF	(England)	Ben Chilwell	18	1	7+4	1	4	0	1	0	0	0	1+1	0
4	MF	(England)	Danny Drinkwater	43	1	27+2	1	2	0	1	0	1	0	10	0
5	DF	(Jamaica)	Wes Morgan	40	3	27	1	2	1	1	0	1	0	9	1
6	DF	(Germany)	Robert Huth	43	2	33	2	2	0	0	0	1	0	7	0
7	FW	(Nigeria)	Ahmed Musa	30	4	7+13	2	2+2	2	0	0	0+1	0	3+2	0
8	MF	(England)	Matty James	1	0	0+1	0	0	0	0	0	0	0	0	0
9	FW	(England)	Jamie Vardy	48	16	33+2	13	1+1	0	0+1	0	1	1	9	2
10	MF	(Wales)	Andy King	32	2	15+8	1	3	1	1	0	1	0	2+2	0
11	MF	(England)	Marc Albrighton	47	4	29+4	2	3+1	0	0	0	1	0	8+1	2
12	GK	(England)	Ben Hamer	1	0	0	0	0	0	0	0	0	0	1	0
13	MF	(Ghana)	Daniel Amartey	35	1	17+7	1	2	0	0+1	0	0	0	3+5	0
14	MF	(Poland)	Bartosz Kapustka	3	0	0	0	2+1	0	0	0	0	0	0	0
15	DF	(Ghana)	Jeffrey Schlupp*	9	0	1+3	0	0	0	1	0	0+1	0	2+1	0
17	DF	(England)	Danny Simpson	45	0	34+1	0	2	0	1	0	1	0	6	0
18	DF	(Mali)	Molla Wagué	1	0	0	0	1	0	0	0	0	0	0	0
19	FW	(Algeria)	Islam Slimani	29	8	13+10	7	0+1	0	0	0	0	0	3+2	1
20	FW	(Japan)	Shinji Okazaki	41	6	21+9	3	2	0	1	2	1	0	5+2	1
21	GK	(Germany)	Ron-Robert Zieler	13	0	8+1	0	2	0	1	0	0	0	1	0
22	MF	(England)	Demarai Gray	42	2	9+22	1	3+1	1	1	0	0+1	0	1+4	0
23	FW	(Argentina)	Leonardo Ulloa	23	1	3+13	1	1	0	0+1	0	0+1	0	0+4	0
24	MF	(France)	Nampalys Mendy	9	0	4	0	3	0	0	0	0+1	0	1	0
25	MF	(Nigeria)	Wilfred Ndidi	22	3	17	2	1+1	1	0	0	0	0	3	0
26	MF	(Algeria)	Riyad Mahrez	48	10	33+3	6	0+2	0	0	0	1	0	9	4
27	DF	(Poland)	Marcin Wasilewski	5	0	1	0	1+1	0	1	0	0	0	1	0
28	DF	(Austria)	Christian Fuchs	48	2	35+1	2	1+1	0	0	0	1	0	9	0
29	DF	(Tunisia)	Yohan Benalouane	15	0	11	0	2	0	0	0	0	0	2	0
36	DF	(England)	Elliott Moore	0	0	0	0	0	0	0	0	0	0	0	0
39	MF	(England)	Harvey Barnes	1	0	0	0	0	0	0	0	0	0	0+1	0

=== Goalscorers ===
Rnk	No	Pos	Nat	Name	Premier League	FA Cup	League Cup	Champions League	Community Shield	Total
1	9	FW	(England)	Jamie Vardy	13	0	0	2	1	16
2	26	MF	(Algeria)	Riyad Mahrez	6	0	0	4	0	10
3	19	FW	(Algeria)	Islam Slimani	7	0	0	1	0	8
4	20	FW	(Japan)	Shinji Okazaki	3	0	2	1	0	6
5	7	FW	(Nigeria)	Ahmed Musa	2	2	0	0	0	4
5	11	MF	(England)	Marc Albrighton	2	0	0	2	0	4
7	5	DF	(Jamaica)	Wes Morgan	1	1	0	1	0	3
7	25	MF	(Nigeria)	Wilfred Ndidi	2	1	0	0	0	3
9
9	28	DF	(Austria)	Christian Fuchs	2	0	0	0	0	2
9	6	DF	(Germany)	Robert Huth	2	0	0	0	0	2
9	22	MF	(England)	Demarai Gray	1	1	0	0	0	2
9	10	MF	(Wales)	Andy King	1	1	0	0	0	2
13
13	23	FW	(Argentina)	Leonardo Ulloa	1	0	0	0	0	1
13	13	MF	(Ghana)	Daniel Amartey	1	0	0	0	0	1
13	4	MF	(England)	Danny Drinkwater	1	0	0	0	0	1
13	3	DF	(England)	Ben Chilwell	1	0	0	0	0	1
Own goals					2	1	0	0	0	3
Total					48	7	2	11	1	69
