= Harlington Manor =

Manor house in Bedfordshire, England

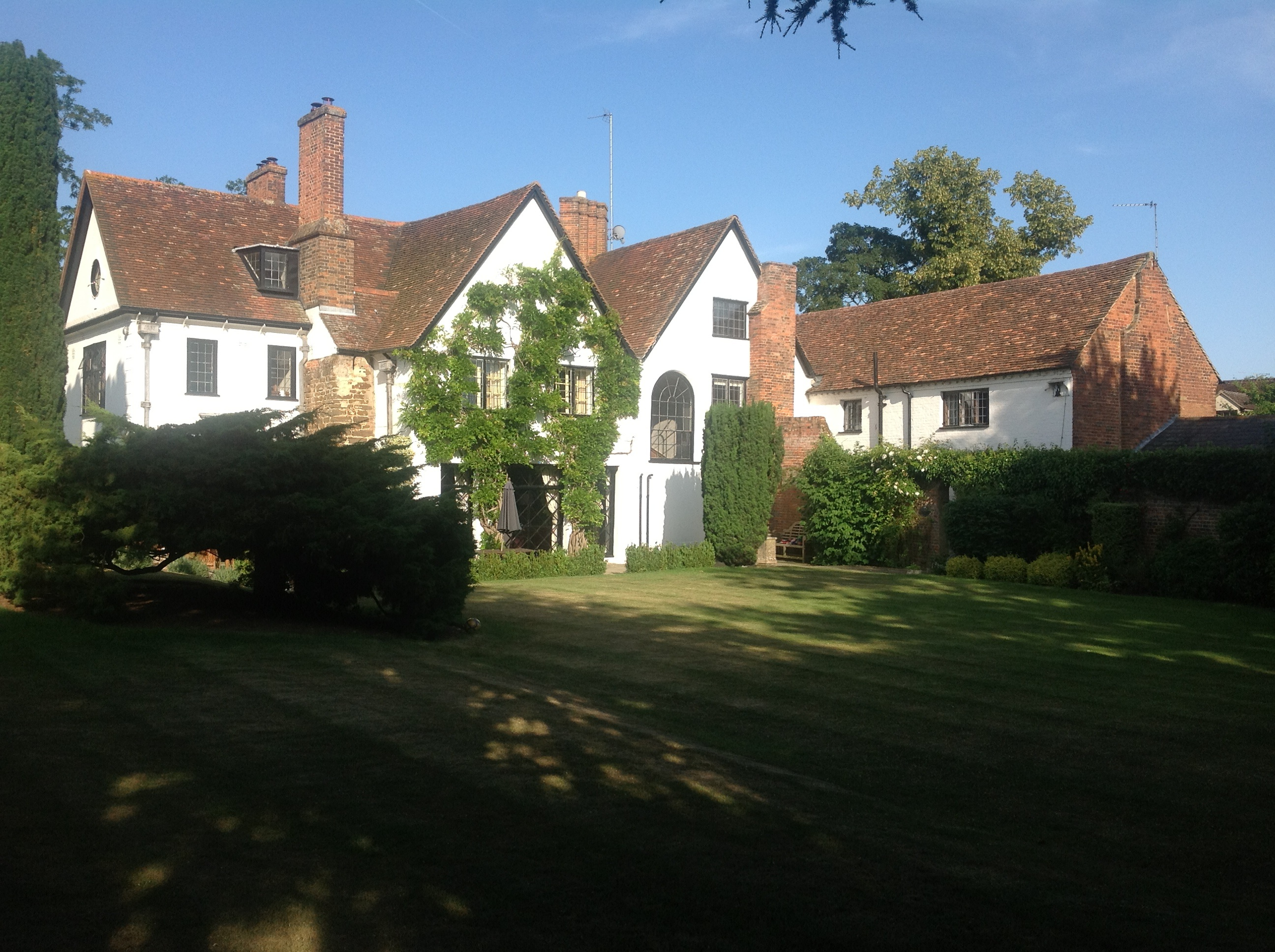
- Harlington Manor in 2013

- Location within Bedfordshire

General information
- Type: House
- Location: Harlington, Bedfordshire, England, Station Road; Harlington; Dunstable; LU5 6LD
- Coordinates: 51.962883°N 0.492794°W
- Year built: 16th century

Listed Building – Grade II*
- Official name: Harlington Manor
- Designated: 22 October 1952
- Reference no.: 1137774

Harlington Manor is a Grade II* listed manor house in Harlington, Bedfordshire, England. The house abuts, and has views over, Bury Orchard, the village common, which itself abuts the Chilterns Area of Outstanding Natural Beauty.

== History ==
English Heritage, in their listing notice, ascribe Harlington Manor to the 16th century, though recent architectural and documentary examination strongly suggests that the house dates, in fact, to the late 14th century and, possibly, to 1396. The Little Parlour contains obviously original, trestle sawn joists. Trestle sawing, as a technique, ceased to be used after the mid-1400s, putting the latest constructional date no later than that time. The house was owned by the Burwell family from around 1500 (the Burwells were early colonisers of Virginia in the New World), but it passed, through intermarriage, to the Wingate family in the early 17th century. It was, the listing notice claims, owned by Edmund Wingate, mathematician and tutor to Queen Henrietta Maria.

Famously, John Bunyan, the English divine, was interrogated by Sir Francis Wingate and briefly imprisoned in the house, in November 1660. Bunyan was sent to Bedford gaol where, over the next 12 years, he wrote The Pilgrim's Progress. It is thought that Harlington Manor is the only building still standing at which Bunyan is known to have stayed.

Charles II is said to have stayed briefly at the house in late 1660, apparently to thank Sir Francis Wingate for his help in dealing with the potential sedition of John Bunyan.

Harlington Manor was formerly known as Harlington House, its name being changed at some point towards the end of the 19th century.

== Architecture ==
The house is of complex plan, and possesses some fine early 17th-century panelling, as well as four centred Tudor fireplaces, moulded beams and a Tudor foliate boss. There is an unusual modillion cornice adorning the eastern elevation.

In 1937 the architect, Sir Albert Richardson (responsible for works to Somerset House and the designer of the North London Collegiate School, Manchester Opera House and numerous other high-profile commissions) designed an extension forming a new north wing. Prior to the undertaking of those works, the house had also been extended in the 17th and 19th centuries.

The barn, situated in the grounds of the house, is fully beamed. The roof timbers display apotropaic (ritual) burn marks, probably dating from the 17th century. The structure of the building is likely to be considerably older, however-probably no later than the mid-15th century. The beams show many carpenter's marks-used as an aid to re-assembly of the structure on site, after the timbers had first been cut and erected at the yard of the local wright.

Its exterior possesses a blue plaque, part of the Harlington Heritage Blue Plaque Scheme, commemorating the appearance of John Bunyan at the house. Harlington Manor currently operates as an upmarket bed and breakfast, having been listed as one of the top thirty in the UK by The Times in 2017.

== See also ==
- Grade II* listed buildings in Bedfordshire
