= Church of Saint Mary the Virgin, Harlington, Bedfordshire =

Church in Harlington, Bedfordshire, England

Coordinates: 51.9638°N 0.4908°W

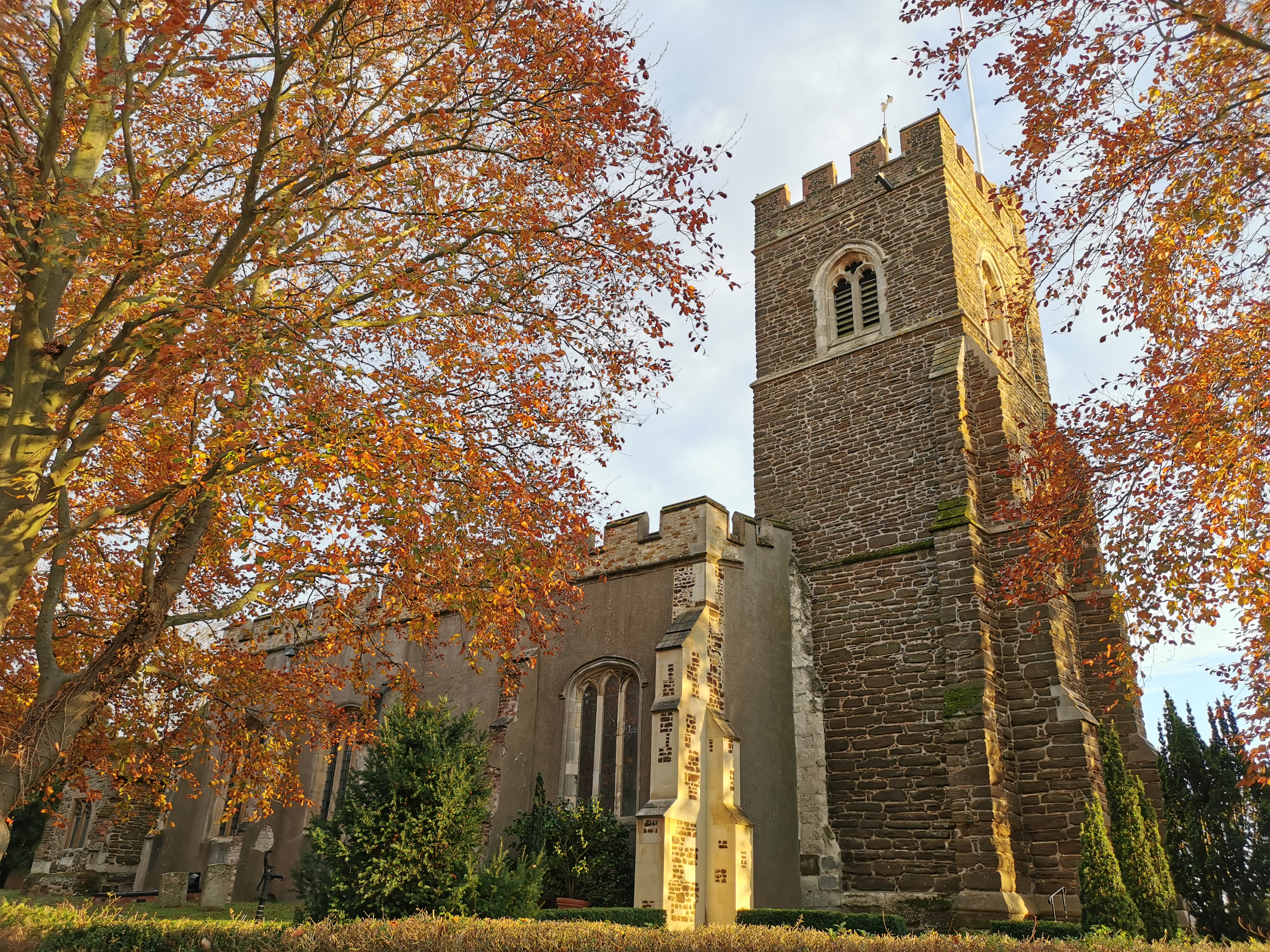

Church of Saint Mary the Virgin is a Grade I listed church in Harlington, Bedfordshire, England. It became a listed building on 23 January 1961.

== See also ==
- Grade I listed buildings in Bedfordshire
