= Ben Chilwell =

English footballer (born 1996)

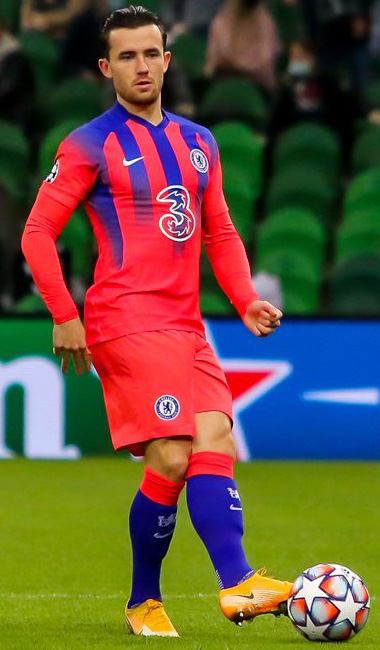
- Chilwell playing for Chelsea in 2020

Personal information
- Full name: Benjamin James Chilwell
- Date of birth: 21 December 1996 (age 29)
- Place of birth: Milton Keynes, England
- Height: 5 ft 10 in (1.78 m)
- Positions: Left-back; left wing-back

Team information
- Current team: Crystal Palace
- Number: 33

Youth career
- –2009: Rushden & Diamonds
- 2009–2015: Leicester City

Senior career*
Years	Team	Apps	(Gls)
2015–2020	Leicester City	99	(4)
2015–2016	→ Huddersfield Town (loan)	8	(0)
2020–2025	Chelsea	70	(8)
2025	→ Crystal Palace (loan)	8	(1)
2025–2026	Strasbourg	20	(0)
2026–	Crystal Palace	2	(1)

International career
2014	England U18	3	(0)
2014–2015	England U19	6	(0)
2015	England U20	2	(1)
2016–2018	England U21	10	(0)
2018–2024	England	21	(1)
Medal record
Men's football
Representing England
UEFA European Championship
Runner-up	2020 Europe
UEFA Nations League
Third place	2019 Portugal
- * Club domestic league appearances and goals as of 19:02, 19 October 2026 (UTC)

Benjamin James Chilwell (born 21 December 1996) is an English professional footballer who plays as a left-back or left wing-back for Premier League club Crystal Palace.

Beginning his career at Leicester City, Chilwell had a loan spell with Huddersfield Town. He was part of Leicester City’s Premier League-winning squad in 2015–16. He joined Chelsea in 2020 and won the UEFA Champions League in his first season with the club. He made over 100 appearances for Chelsea, as well as won the FA Cup on loan with Crystal Palace in 2025. He departed Chelsea permanently and joined French side Strasbourg in 2025, subsequently leaving Strasbourg as a free transfer to join Crystal Palace for the second time in his career in 2026.

At international level, Chilwell made his debut for England in 2018. He was a member of the England squad that finished as runners-up at UEFA Euro 2020.

== Early life ==
Benjamin James Chilwell was born on 21 December 1996 in Milton Keynes, Buckinghamshire, and was raised in Ampthill, Bedfordshire. He attended Redborne Upper School and Community College in Ampthill.

== Club career ==
=== Leicester City ===
Chilwell joined Leicester City's academy aged 12 in 2009 having played in Rushden & Diamonds' centre of excellence. He won their Academy Player of the Year award at the end of the 2014–15 season.

After featuring for the club in pre-season under new manager Claudio Ranieri, Chilwell was given the number 30 shirt ahead of the 2015–16 season. On 27 October 2015, in the club's League Cup match against Hull City, he made his first-team debut. Chilwell played the entire match as Leicester lost 5–4 in a penalty shootout following a 1–1 draw after extra time.

On 19 November 2015, Chilwell joined Championship club Huddersfield Town on a loan until 3 January 2016. He made his debut nine days later in a 2–0 home loss to Middlesbrough. Despite only spending six weeks at the West Yorkshire club, Chilwell would later describe his spell as "a big part of [his] growth in [his] career" and credited Huddersfield manager David Wagner with aiding his development as an attacking full back.

In January 2016, Chilwell was recalled from his loan by Leicester City. On 10 January, he started at left-back and played the full 90 minutes of a 2–2 draw away at Tottenham Hotspur in the third round of the FA Cup. Ten days later, he made his first appearance at King Power Stadium as Leicester were beaten 2–0 by Tottenham in the replay. He was described in the BBC's match report as "Leicester's best player" and "exceptional as an attacking full-back".

On 28 July 2016, Chilwell signed a new contract with Leicester until June 2021. Having previously been assigned the number 30, Chilwell was given the squad number 3 for the 2016–17 season.

He made his Premier League debut on 26 December in a 2–0 home defeat to Everton. Five days later, he made his first home appearance in the Premier League, playing the full 90 minutes of a 1–0 win over West Ham United.

He made 19 appearances across the 2016–17 season, including two in the UEFA Champions League, and scored his first career goal on 18 May 2017 in a 6–1 home loss to Tottenham Hotspur.

During the 2017–18 season, Chilwell became Leicester's first-choice left-back ahead of Christian Fuchs. Chilwell was sent off for the first time in his career on 13 January 2018 after receiving two yellow cards within five minutes of each other in a goalless draw away to Chelsea.

He signed a new six-year contract with Leicester on 20 October 2018 and, five days later, scored once and assisted two more goals in the team's record 9–0 win away at Southampton.

On 9 November 2019, Chilwell made his 100th appearance for Leicester City in a 2–0 home win over Arsenal in the Premier League.

=== Chelsea ===
==== 2020–2023 ====
On 26 August 2020, Chilwell signed a five-year contract with Chelsea, after Leicester City had accepted an offer for the player, reported by BBC Sport to be £45 million. He made his debut on 23 September, providing the assist for Olivier Giroud's goal in a 6–0 home win against Barnsley in the third round of the EFL Cup after he came off from the bench. On his first league start for the club on 3 October, Chilwell scored the opening goal and assisted Kurt Zouma for the second as Chelsea beat Crystal Palace 4–0 at home.

On 7 April 2021, Chilwell scored his first UEFA Champions League goal in a 2–0 away win over Porto in the first-leg of the quarter-final tie. On 16 May, Chilwell scored against his former club Leicester City in the 2021 FA Cup final in the 88th minute, only for it to be disallowed by VAR, as Leicester went on to win 1–0. On 29 May, Chilwell won his first-ever trophy after Chelsea defeated Manchester City 1–0 in the 2021 UEFA Champions League final in Porto.

On 2 October 2021, on his first Premier League start of the campaign, Chilwell scored his first goal of the season in a 3–1 home win over Southampton. Chilwell would go on to score in Chelsea's next two league games as well, 1–0 win against Brentford and a 7–0 victory over Norwich City. Having scored in Chelsea's final match of the 2020–21 Premier League season, Chilwell became the first English player to score in four consecutive Premier League games for Chelsea since Frank Lampard in February 2013.

On 23 November 2021, Chilwell sustained a ruptured cruciate ligament injury in a 4–0 home win during Chelsea's 2021–22 UEFA Champions League group stage match against Juventus. He was substituted in the second half after a coming together with Adrien Rabiot. On 28 December 2021, it was revealed in a statement by Chelsea that Chilwell would have to receive a surgical repair, which ruled him out for the rest of the season.

==== 2023–2025 ====
Chilwell signed a new contract with Chelsea on 11 April 2023, keeping him at the club until the summer of 2027. In August, he was named as Chelsea's new vice-captain, acting as deputy to Reece James. On 25 February 2024, Chilwell captained Chelsea in the 2024 EFL Cup final where they lost 1–0 to Liverpool.

Chilwell's future with the club was cast into doubt in late August 2024 when new manager Enzo Maresca made clear the player was not in his plans, telling reporters "with (Chilwell), I said he is a lovely guy but with his position, he's going to struggle with us." On 23 September, Maresca announced that Chilwell was back in the squad for the EFL Cup home tie against Barrow the following day; he appeared as a 46th-minute substitute in a 5–0 win, which ended up being his only appearance for Chelsea of the season.

==== Loan to Crystal Palace ====
On 3 February 2025, Chilwell joined Crystal Palace on loan for the remainder of the 2024–25 season. On 1 March, he was subjected to homophobic chants by Millwall supporters during the fifth round of the FA Cup, an incident which sparked an investigation by the Football Association. Crystal Palace defeated Millwall 3–1, and would eventually progress to the final; Chilwell was an unused substitute as the club went on to lift the FA Cup for the first time in its history following a 1–0 victory against Manchester City. On 20 May, he scored his first goal for Palace in a 4–2 league win over Wolverhampton Wanderers.

=== Strasbourg ===
On 1 September 2025, Chilwell joined Ligue 1 club RC Strasbourg on a two-year contract. He made his RC Strasbourg debut against Le Havre AC on 15 September, and went on to play 20 Ligue 1 matches and nine UEFA Conference League matches in the 2025–26 season .

=== Return to Crystal Palace ===
On 1 September 2026, Chilwell rejoined Crystal Palace on a permanent transfer.

== International career ==
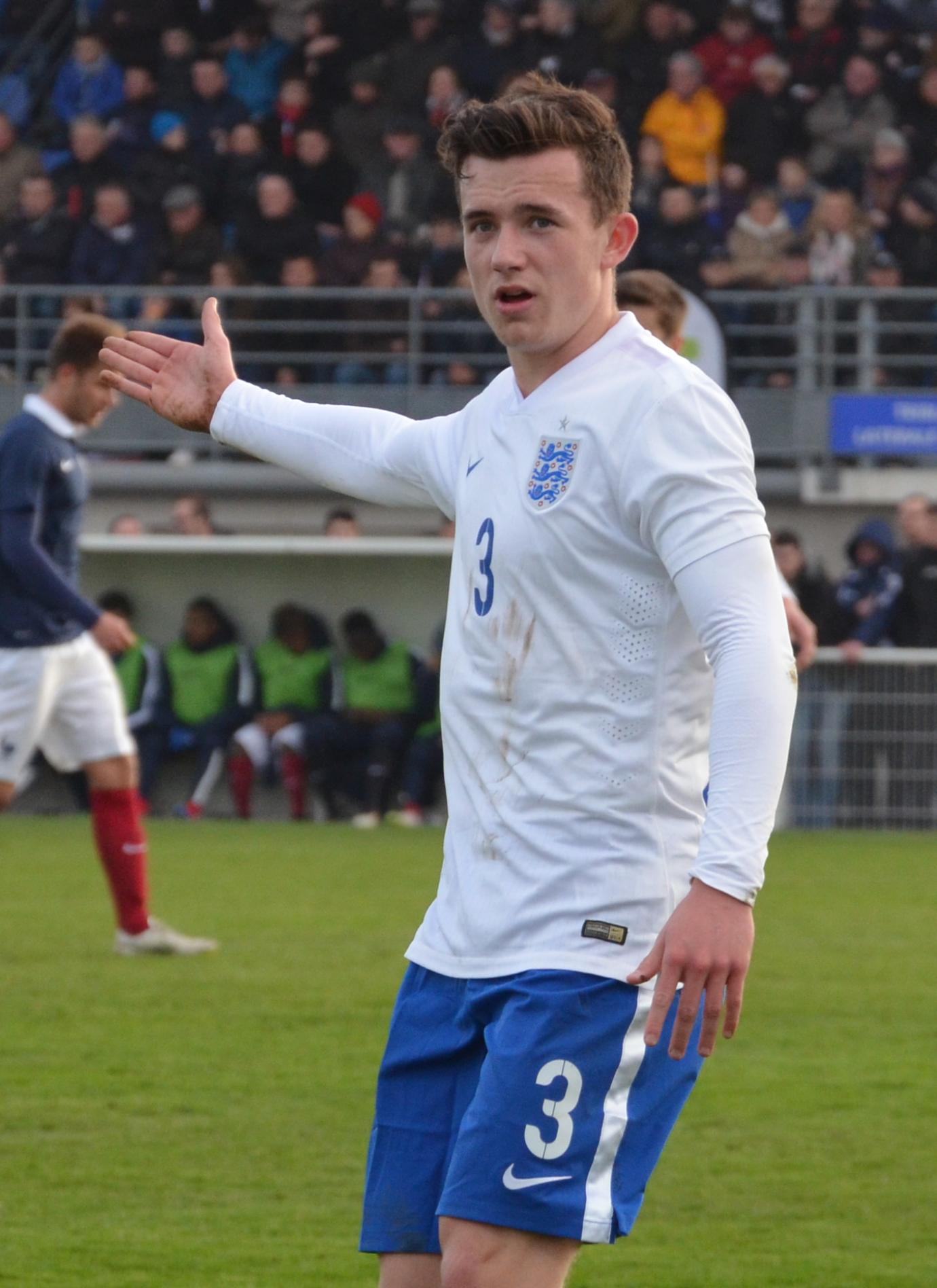
Chilwell playing for England U19 in 2015

Along with his Leicester teammate Demarai Gray, Chilwell was called up from the under-21 team to the full England squad in September 2018 for a friendly match against Switzerland. He made his debut in this match on 11 September, as a 79th-minute substitute for Danny Rose in a 1–0 home win. Upon taking to the pitch in the match at the King Power Stadium he became the first England player to debut at his club ground since Paul Scholes at Old Trafford in 1997. Chilwell made his first start on 12 October in a goalless draw with Croatia in the 2018–19 UEFA Nations League A, in a match played behind closed doors.

Chilwell was named in the 26-man England squad for UEFA Euro 2020. On 22 June 2021, Chilwell and fellow England player Mason Mount were forced to self-isolate after coming into contact with Scotland player Billy Gilmour, who tested positive for COVID-19 after England's goalless draw with Scotland at the tournament.

On 9 October 2021, Chilwell scored his first international goal in a 5–0 away win during England's 2022 FIFA World Cup qualification match against Andorra.

== Personal life ==
Chilwell's father was from New Zealand and emigrated to England in 1993, three years prior to Chilwell's birth.

Chilwell's maternal grandfather Guy Shuttleworth was also a sportsman who played football for Corinthian-Casuals — winning an international cap for England Amateurs in 1949 — and represented Cambridge University at first-class cricket. He died at the age of 94 on 21 January 2021. Chilwell played cricket for his local club, Flitwick.

Chilwell is the godfather to former Leicester City teammate James Maddison's son.

Chilwell was the victim of a campaign of harassment by TikToker Orla Melissa Sloan between 2021 and 2023. Sloan was convicted for harassment in June 2023, as well as of stalking Chilwell's former team-mates Mason Mount and Billy Gilmour.

== Career statistics ==
=== Club ===
As of match played 28 October 2026

Appearances and goals by club, season and competition
Club	Season	League			National cup (Note: Includes FA Cup, Coupe de France)		League cup (Note: Includes EFL Cup)		Europe		Other		Total	
Club	Season	Division	Apps	Goals	Apps	Goals	Apps	Goals	Apps	Goals	Apps	Goals	Apps	Goals
Leicester City	2015–16	Premier League	0	0	2	0	1	0	—		—		3	0
Leicester City	2016–17	Premier League	12	1	4	0	1	0	2 (Note: Appearances in UEFA Champions League)	0	0	0	19	1
Leicester City	2017–18	Premier League	24	0	4	0	4	0	—		—		32	0
Leicester City	2018–19	Premier League	36	0	0	0	0	0	—		—		36	0
Leicester City	2019–20	Premier League	27	3	3	0	3	0	—		—		33	3
Leicester City	Total		99	4	13	0	9	0	2	0	0	0	123	4
Huddersfield Town (loan)	2015–16	Championship	8	0	—		—		—		—		8	0
Leicester City U23	2016–17	—			—		—		—		1 (Note: Appearance in EFL Trophy)	0	1	0
Chelsea	2020–21	Premier League	27	3	3	0	2	0	10	1	—		42	4
Chelsea	2021–22	Premier League	7	3	0	0	2	0	4	0	0	0	13	3
Chelsea	2022–23	Premier League	23	2	0	0	0	0	7	0	—		30	2
Chelsea	2023–24	Premier League	13	0	5	0	3	0	—		—		21	0
Chelsea	2024–25	Premier League	0	0	0	0	1	0	0	0	0	0	1	0
Chelsea	Total		70	8	8	0	8	0	21	1	0	0	107	9
Crystal Palace (loan)	2024–25	Premier League	8	1	3	0	—		—		—		11	1
Strasbourg	2025–26	Ligue 1	20	0	5	0	—		9 (Note: Appearances in UEFA Conference League)	0	—		34	0
Crystal Palace	2026–27	Premier League	2	1	0	0	2	0	0	0	—		4	1
Career total			207	14	29	0	19	0	32	1	1	0	288	15

=== International ===
As of match played 26 March 2024

Appearances and goals by national team and year
National team	Year	Apps	Goals
England	2018	5	0
England	2019	6	0
England	2020	1	0
England	2021	5	1
England	2023	2	0
England	2024	2	0
Total		21	1

As of match played 26 March 2024
England score listed first, score column indicates score after each Chilwell goal

List of international goals scored by Ben Chilwell
No.	Date	Venue	Cap	Opponent	Score	Result	Competition	Ref.
1	9 October 2021	Estadi Nacional, Andorra la Vella, Andorra	15	Andorra	1–0	5–0	2022 FIFA World Cup qualification	

== Honours ==
Chelsea

- UEFA Champions League: 2020–21
- UEFA Super Cup: 2021
- FIFA Club World Cup: 2021
- FA Cup runner-up: 2020–21
- EFL Cup runner-up: 2023–24

Crystal Palace

- FA Cup: 2024–25

England

- UEFA European Championship runner-up: 2020
- UEFA Nations League third place: 2018–19

Individual

- UEFA Champions League Squad of the Season: 2020–21
- Leicester City Under-21s Player of the Season: 2015–16
- Leicester City Academy Player of the Year: 2014–15
