= Harlington railway station =

Railway station in Bedfordshire, England

Harlington
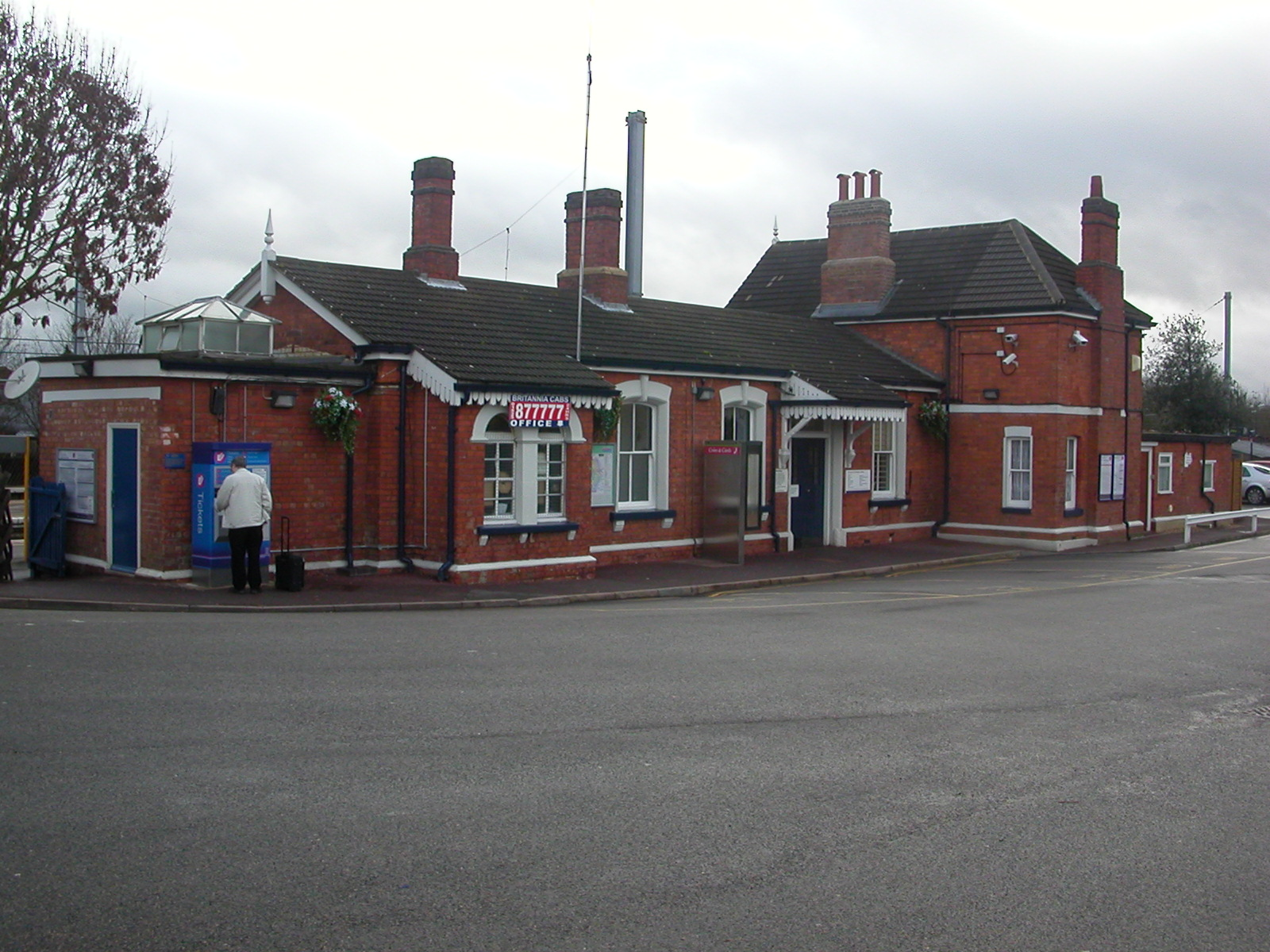
- The front of the main station building

General information
- Location: Harlington, District of Central Bedfordshire; England
- Coordinates: 51.962°N 0.496°W
- Grid reference: TL034303
- Manager: Thameslink
- Platforms: 4

Other information
- Station code: HLN
- Classification: DfT category D

History
- Opened: 1868

Passengers
- 2020/21: ▼67,484
- 2021/22: ▲0.198 million
- 2022/23: ▲0.266 million
- 2023/24: ▲0.296 million
- 2024/25: ▲0.308 million
Location
Notes
- Passenger statistics from the Office of Rail and Road

Harlington railway station is located in Bedfordshire. It is named after the village of Harlington, on the outskirts of which it is located, but serves a wide rural area including the larger villages of Toddington and Barton-le-Clay. The station is situated on the Midland Main Line and managed by Thameslink. Schedules and other material often call the station Harlington (Bedfordshire) to avoid confusion with the Hayes & Harlington railway station in West London.

== History ==
It was built by the Midland Railway in 1868 on its extension to St. Pancras. The station buildings still exist and were carefully restored in the early 1980s.

== Facilities ==
Harlington station has the following facilities shelters on each platform, a telephone, a ticket machine, cycle storage and a car park.

The ticket office is open on weekdays and Saturdays. In January 2009, the previous franchisee First Capital Connect proposed that the ticket office at Harlington railway station would open for just four hours per day, although opening hours were not reduced as much as planned.

== Services ==
All services at Harlington are operated by Thameslink using Class 700 EMUs.

The typical off-peak service in trains per hour is:

- 4 tph to Bedford
- 2 tph to Brighton
- 2 tph to Three Bridges via Redhill

During the peak hours, the station is served by additional services to and from Rainham, Sutton and East Grinstead.

The station is also served by a half-hourly night service between Bedford and Three Bridges on Sunday to Friday nights.

Preceding station	National Rail	Following station
Flitwick	Thameslink Thameslink	Leagrave
