= Harlington, Bedfordshire =

Village in Bedfordshire, England

Coordinates: 51.963355°N 0.495006°W

Harlington
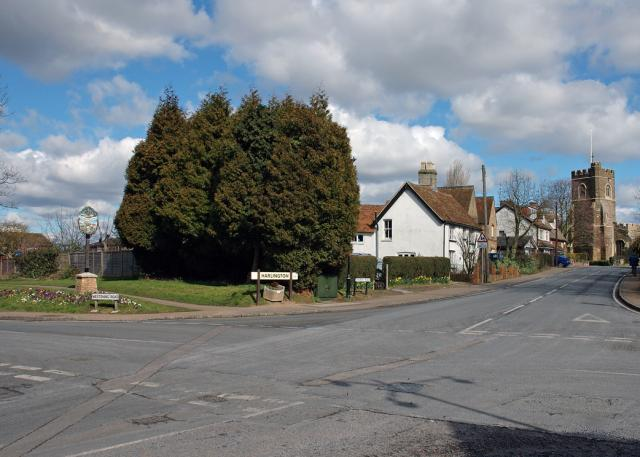
- Harlington Crossroads

- Location within Bedfordshire
- Population: 2,300 (2011 Census); 2,278 (2021 Census)
- OS grid reference: TL035305
- Civil parish: Harlington
- Unitary authority: Central Bedfordshire
- Ceremonial county: Bedfordshire
- Region: East
- Country: England
- Sovereign state: United Kingdom
- Post town: DUNSTABLE
- Postcode district: LU5
- Dialling code: 01582, 01525
- Police: Bedfordshire
- Fire: Bedfordshire
- Ambulance: East of England
- UK Parliament: Mid Bedfordshire

Harlington is a village and civil parish located in Bedfordshire, England, near the M1 motorway. The nearest town is Flitwick about 3 miles (4.8 km) to the north.

== Transport links ==
=== Road ===
The village is about 1.5 miles (2.4 km) from junction 12 of the M1, 7 miles (11 km) north of Luton, 10 miles (16 km) south of Bedford and 40 miles (64 km) north northwest of London.

=== Rail ===
Harlington has a railway station in the west of the village. It was built by the Midland Railway in 1868 on its extension to St Pancras. The original intention had been to call it "Harlington for Toddington". The station is served by Thameslink route trains. From Harlington station, you can travel north to Flitwick and Bedford, or south to Luton, Luton Airport Parkway, Harpenden, St Albans, Central London, East Croydon, Gatwick Airport and Brighton.

=== Buses ===
The X42 service provides a direct link to Toddington, Westoning, Flitwick, Ampthill, Houghton Conquest, Kempston, and Bedford.

=== Air ===
The nearest airport is at Luton, about 8 miles (13 km) to the south.

== Amenities ==
There are several churches, including the Church of St Mary the Virgin, Harlington Methodist Church and Life Church (part of the Pioneer network of churches). There is a small parade of shops consisting of a general store with post office counter, a dry cleaner, an estate agent and a cafe.

There are several buildings surrounding the village green (also called Bury Orchard) used for community activities. These include the parish hall, village hall and scout hut. A cricket pitch adjoins the village green.

== Schools ==
The village is home to two schools, Harlington Lower and Harlington Upper. The lower school takes children from reception class through to age 9 (end of school Year 4), and received an "Outstanding" rating in its 2010 OFSTED Report. Also on the Lower School site is Harlington Village Pre-School, a volunteer-run charity accepting children from the ages of two years and nine months. As Central Bedfordshire operates a three-tier system, children aged between 9 and 13 (school Years 5 to 8) attend Parkfields Middle School in nearby Toddington.

Harlington Upper School serves a large rural area, and takes children from age 13 (school Year 9) up to A-level. In 2006, Harlington Upper School became a specialist science college, thanks to funding raised by its parent-teacher association, HUSA.

== History ==
- 1086: The Domesday Book calls the village Herlingdone and lists Nigel D'Albini as Lord of the Manor; he took over from four Saxon thegns who lost their lands at the time of the Norman Conquest in 1066.
- 1300–1350: The Church of St Mary the Virgin was built, replacing what was probably a wooden church with a thatched roof. The church tower was not added until the 15th century.
- 1349: Over a quarter of the village died of the Black Death.
- 1660: John Bunyan led an unauthorised religious meeting at a farmhouse near Harlington, for which he was arrested and taken to Harlington House (now known as Harlington Manor – the only currently occupied residential house connected with Bunyan). After being questioned he was imprisoned for 12 years in Bedford county gaol. While serving his sentence he began writing his most famous work, The Pilgrim's Progress.
- 1830: the first English National Steeplechase on record was run from Bury Orchard to Wrest Park Obelisk.
- 1859: the first village school was built.
- 1868: Harlington railway station opened.
- 1920: Harlington War Memorial dedicated to the memory of 27 Harlington men killed in the First World War.
- 1937: Sir Albert Richardson designs a new North range of Harlington Manor

== See also ==
- Harlington railway station
