= Ampthill =

Town and civil parish in Bedfordshire, England

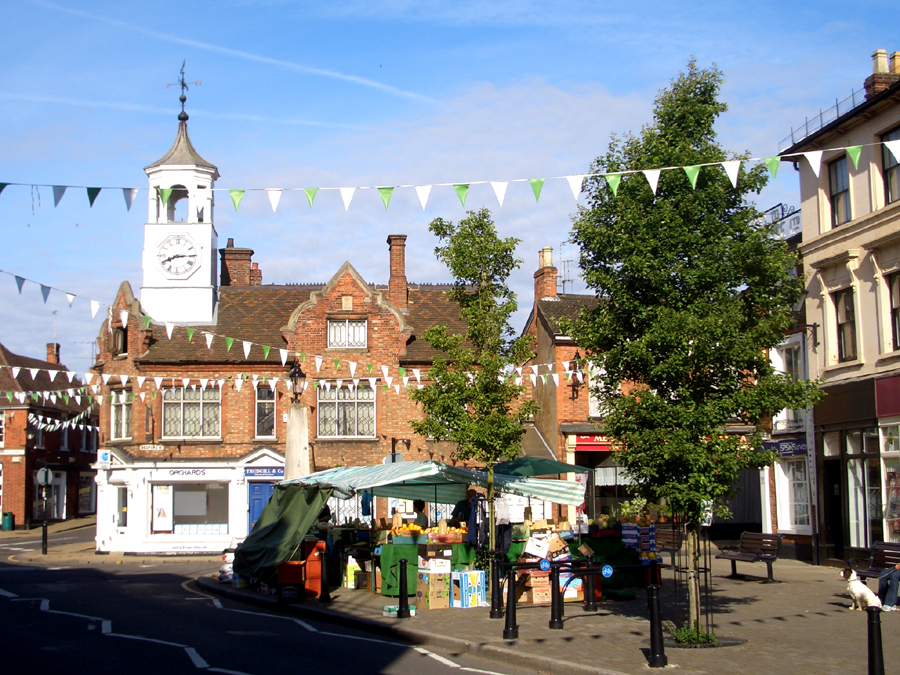
- Ampthill town centre with clock tower (1852) and market place

- Location within Bedfordshire
- Population: 8,822 (Parish, 2021)
- OS grid reference: TL035375
  - London: 40 mi (64 km) SE
- Civil parish: Ampthill
- Unitary authority: Central Bedfordshire
- Ceremonial county: Bedfordshire
- Region: East
- Country: England
- Sovereign state: United Kingdom
- Post town: BEDFORD
- Postcode district: MK45
- Dialling code: 01525
- Police: Bedfordshire
- Fire: Bedfordshire
- Ambulance: East of England
- UK Parliament: Mid Bedfordshire

Ampthill (/ˈæmt(h)ɪl/) is a town and civil parish in the Central Bedfordshire district of Bedfordshire, England. It lies between Bedford and Luton. At the 2021 census it had a population of 8,825.

== History ==
The name 'Ampthill' is of Anglo-Saxon origin. The first settlement was called 'Æmethyll', which literally means either 'anthill' or 'ant-infested hill'. In the Domesday Book, Ampthill is referred to as 'Ammetelle', with the landholder in 1086 being Nigel de la Vast. The actual entry reads: Ammetelle: Nigel de la Vast from Nigel d'Aubigny. A further variation may be 'Hampthull', in 1381.

In 1219 King Henry III granted a charter for a weekly market to be held on a Thursday. In 2019 the market celebrated 800 years.

Henry VIII was a frequent visitor to Ampthill Castle, and it was there that Catherine of Aragon lived from 1531 until her marriage was annulled in 1533, when she was moved to Kimbolton. The castle was built in the 15th century by Sir John Cornwall, later Lord Fanhope, from ransoms after the Battle of Agincourt. Today a park remains just north of the town centre, site of Ampthill's former castle, where Henry VIII would come and hunt. It was in the castle's Great Dining Room that Queen Catherine defiantly received news of the end of her marriage. A cross erected in the 1770s marks the site of this important building which is set within Ampthill Great Park, a "Capability" Brown landscape.

In 1542 an Act of Parliament created the 'Honour of Ampthill', an area of 45 parishes around the town, including 11 in Buckinghamshire, in which the crown owned extensive property and the manorial rights. The Honour was sold to the Dukes of Bedford in parts between 1730 and 1881.

In the mid-1780s, John Fitzpatrick, the 2nd Earl of Upper Ossory, led a campaign to improve the town centre. He created the current market place, erected the water pump and built a new clock tower. Lord Upper Ossory was also responsible for a cross commemorating Catherine of Aragon, with an inscription by Horace Walpole, and a row of thatched cottages built between 1812 and 1816 to house his estate workers.

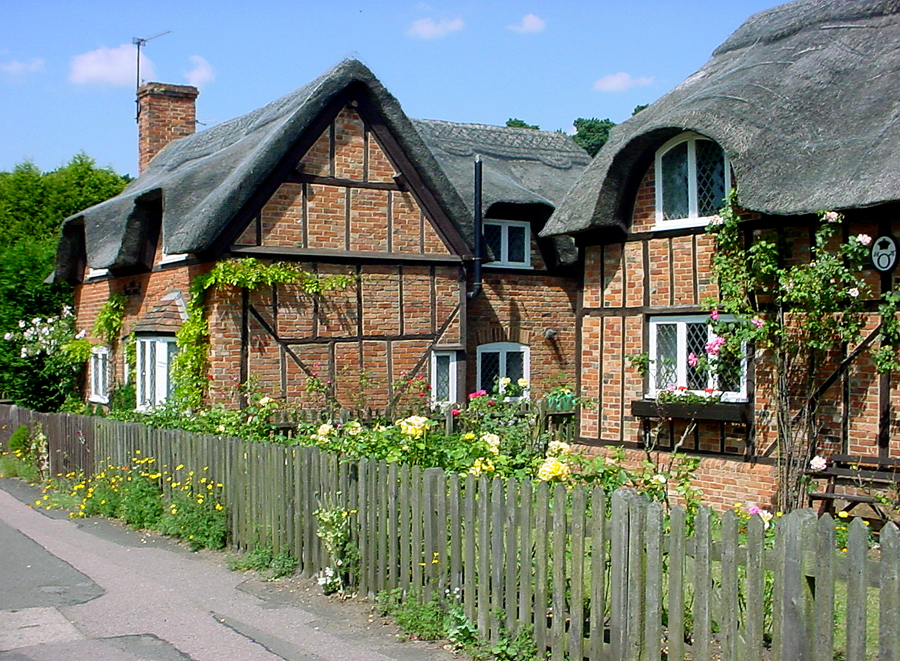
Thatched cottages in Woburn Street, Ampthill. Built 1812–16

On the death of Lord Upper Ossory in 1818, Ampthill Park became the seat of Lord Holland in whose time Holland House in Kensington, London, became famous as a gathering place for intellectuals. Lady Holland planted trees to create the Alameda walk, inspired by the Almeida in Madrid. Ampthill Park was later home to Baron Ampthill.

In 1835 Ampthill became the centre of a Poor Law Union, and a workhouse was built on Dunstable Street shortly afterwards to serve the town and surrounding parishes.

The London and North Western Railway's Bedford Railway branch line opened in 1846, with a station at Millbrook, three miles north-west of Ampthill. At different times this station was known as "Ampthill", "Ampthill (Marston)" and "Millbrook for Ampthill", before the name was changed to "Millbrook" in 1910. In 1868 the Midland Railway opened its main line from the Midlands to London. In order to cross the ridge of high ground on which Ampthill stands, the Ampthill Tunnel was built to the west of the town. Ampthill railway station was built to the south of the tunnel, at the bottom of the hill and over a mile from the market place. This station closed in 1959.

During WWII there was a farming camp near Ampthill where volunteers recovered sugarbeet and were accommodated in tents in the grounds of a nearby country mansion.

Recent years have witnessed substantial development in Ampthill and the surrounding area. The former site of the old Ampthill Brewery in Bedford Street area was substantially redeveloped in 2006/2007, with the demolition of a Shell petrol station, shopping arcade and small Budgens supermarket, to make way for a new Waitrose supermarket, an improved town car park and a development of shops and apartments known as Oxlet House. The supermarket opened on 29 September 2006, with Oxlet House being completed in late 2007. Since then, two major new housing estates have been constructed on the south side of town - Ampthill Heights to the west and Ampthill Gardens to the east. Other significant housing developments have been completed behind The Limes, at the former site of Russell House, off Swaffield Close and in the old orchard off Church Street. A microbrewery reviving the name of the Ampthill Brewery was started in 2014 on the Ampthill industrial estate but ceased operations the following year.

== Governance ==
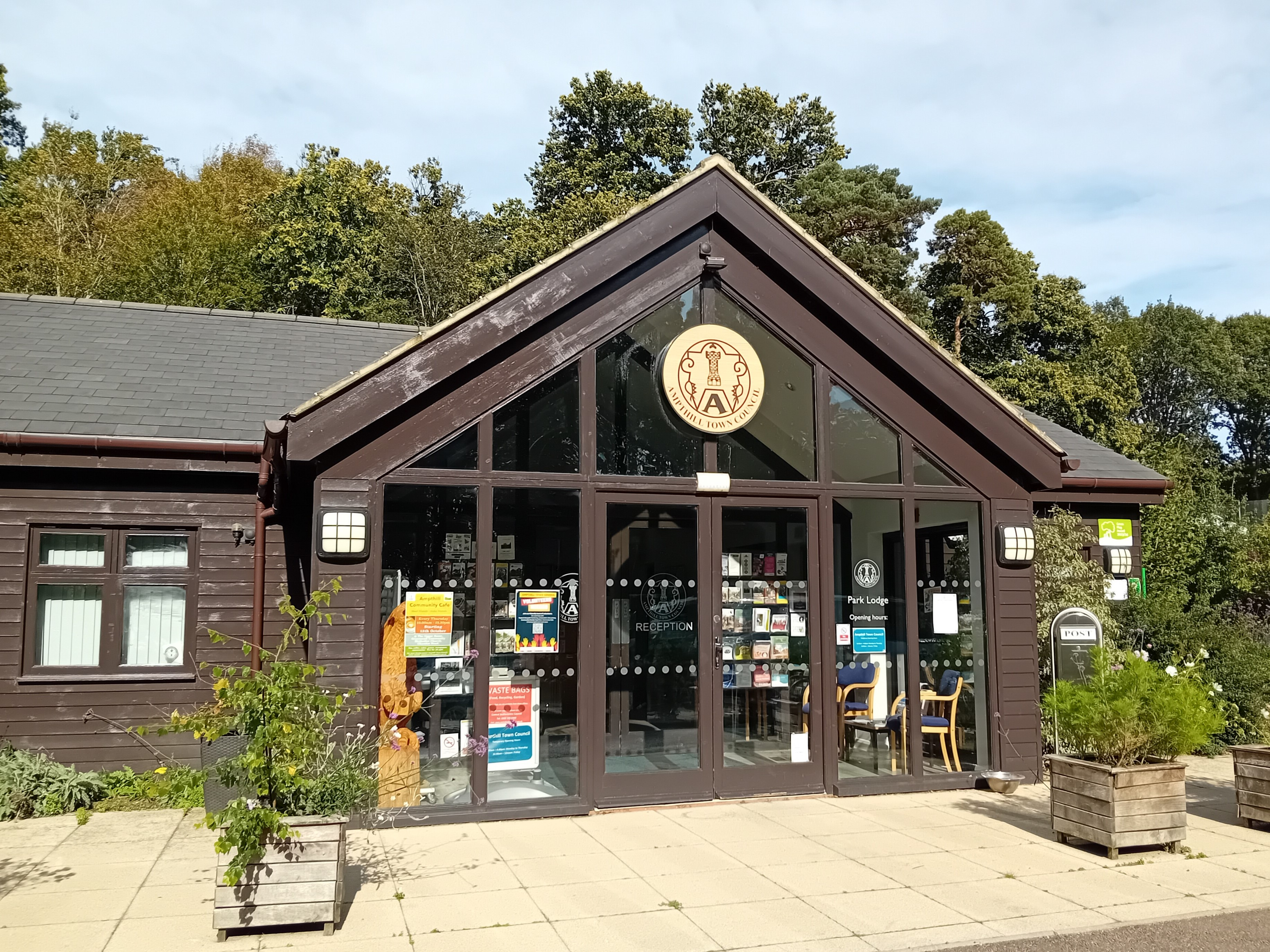
Park Lodge: Town Council offices

There are two tiers of local government covering Ampthill, at parish (town) and unitary authority level: Ampthill Town Council and Central Bedfordshire Council. The town council has its headquarters at Park Lodge in Ampthill Great Park, off Woburn Street.

=== Administrative history ===
Ampthill was an ancient parish. Until 1893 it was governed by its vestry and manorial courts. In 1893 it was made a local government district, administered by an elected local board. The board held its first meeting on 14 April 1893 at the town's courthouse on Church Street, which had been built in the 1860s.

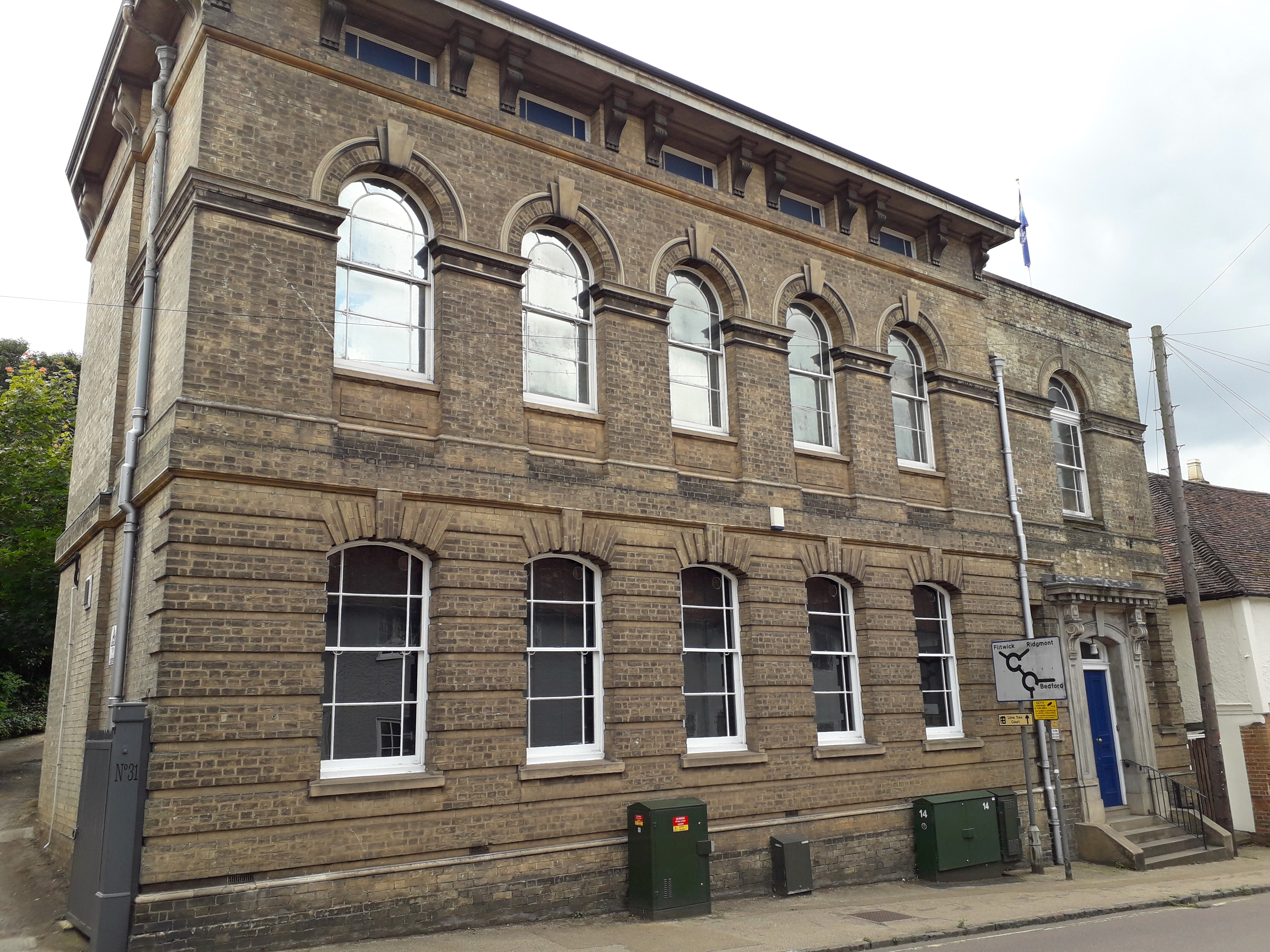
Old Court House, 29b Church Street

Such districts were reconstituted as urban districts in 1894. The urban district council continued to meet at the courthouse until 1920, when it moved its meetings to a room at the town's fire station at 10 Bedford Street, which had been built in 1902. After a new fire station was built in Oliver Street in 1954, the council converted the rest of the old fire station into its offices.

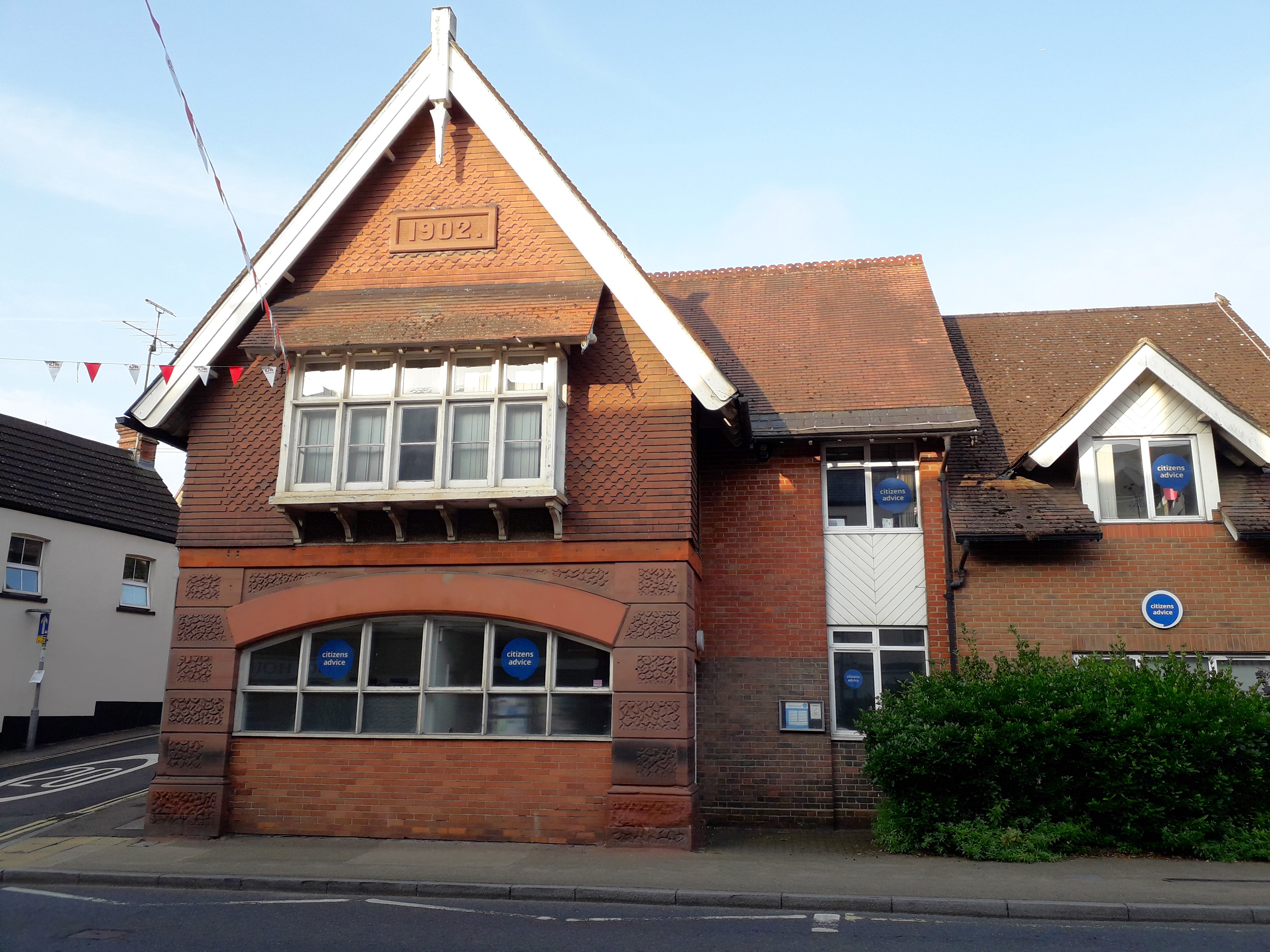
10 Bedford Street: Built 1902 as fire station

Ampthill Urban District was abolished in 1974 under the Local Government Act 1972. It merged with four other districts to become Mid Bedfordshire. The new district council had one of its main offices in the town at the former Ampthill Rural District Council's headquarters at 12 Dunstable Street. A successor parish of Ampthill was created in 1974 for the former urban district, with its council taking the name Ampthill Town Council.

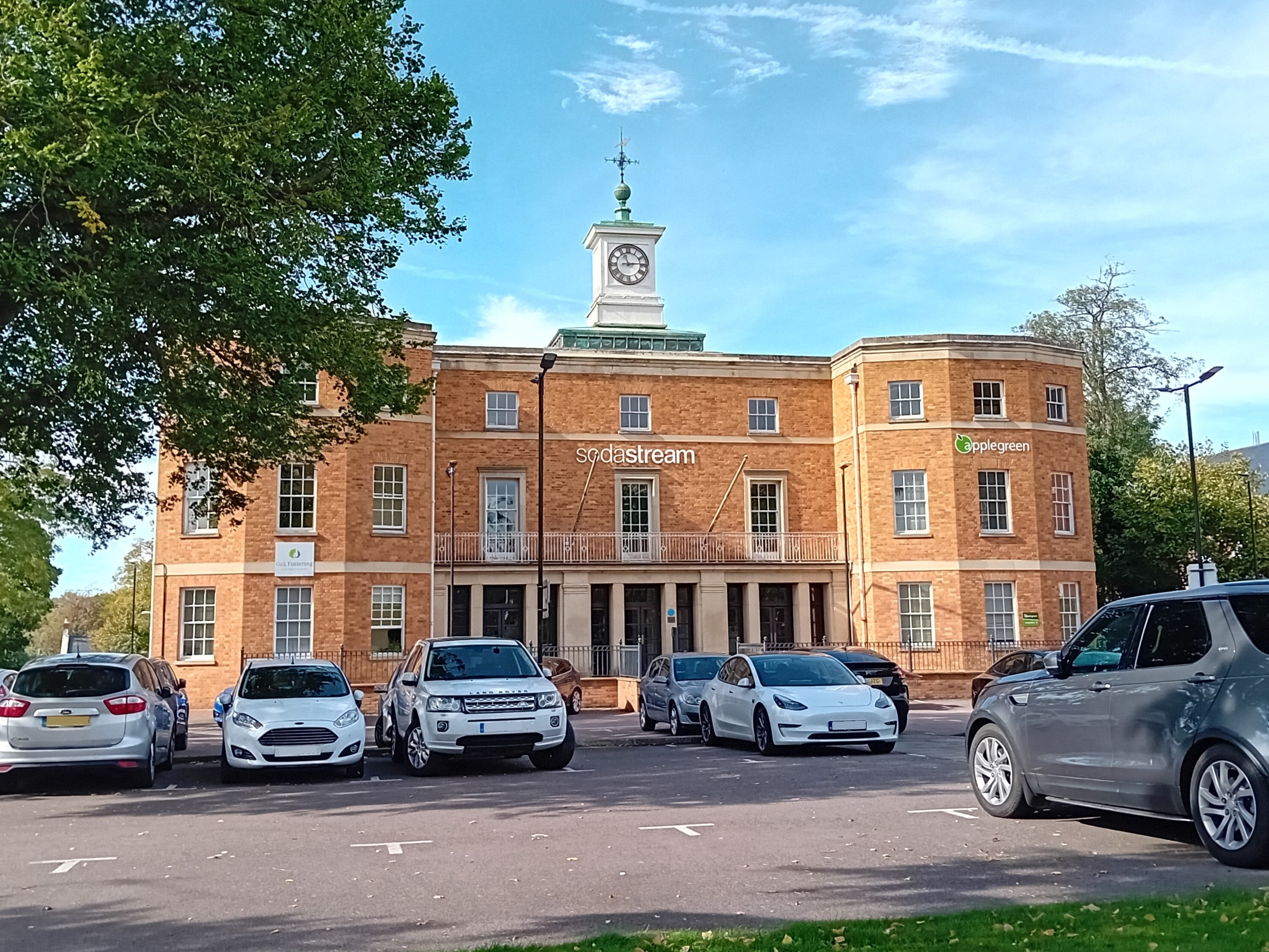
12 Dunstable Street: Completed 1965 for Ampthill Rural District Council, then offices of Mid Bedfordshire District Council 1974–2006

Mid Bedfordshire and Bedfordshire County Council were both abolished in 2009, since when Ampthill has formed part of the unitary authority of Central Bedfordshire.

== Economy ==
Ampthill is a commercial centre for surrounding villages; it has several pubs, restaurants, a Waitrose supermarket and a selection of small independent specialist shops. A number of small businesses such as solicitors, estate agents, financial and professional services, hairdressers, are also located in town, with larger businesses found on the commercial and industrial developments on the outskirts, along the town's bypass.

Ampthill is one of the most expensive places to buy a house in Bedfordshire, even in comparison with other mid-Bedfordshire towns such as neighbouring Flitwick, and Cranfield. In a survey, it was found that the majority of Ampthill's workers are employed locally, with around 20% working in Ampthill itself, and most of the remainder travelling to nearby centres of employment such as Bedford, Luton and Milton Keynes. Around 13% of workers commute from Ampthill to London daily. The survey also found that the turnover of residents was low, most having been in Ampthill for well over a decade.

== Sport and leisure ==
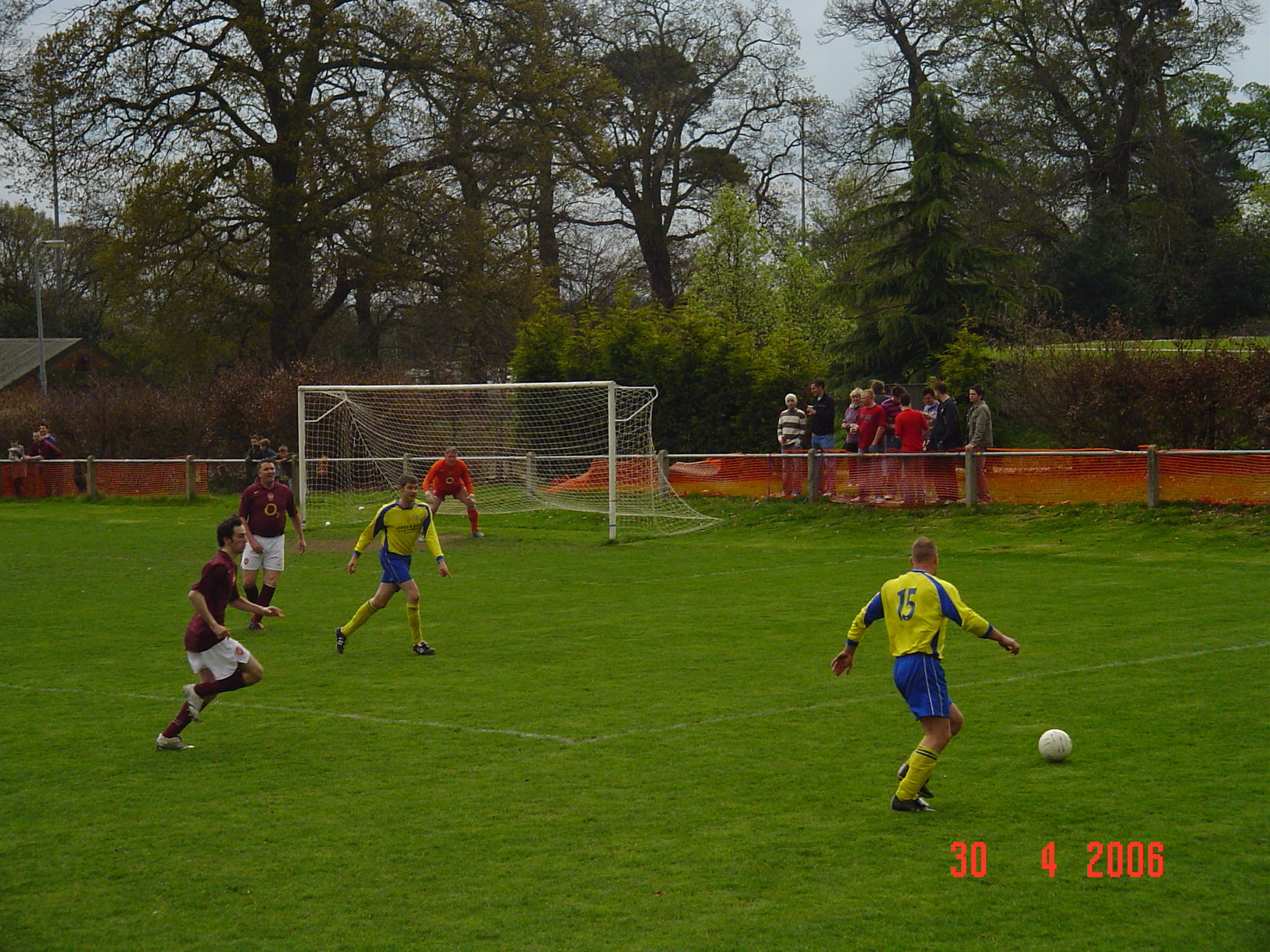
Arsenal Celebrity Charity Team against Ampthill Town. Ampthill (yellow) vs Arsenal (red).

Ampthill has a non-League football team, Ampthill Town F.C. who play at Ampthill Park. Ampthill Super7s is the local 7-a-side football league. It takes place every Monday and Thursday at Redborne Upper School. The town's rugby union club Ampthill RUFC was established in 1881 and plays in the RFU Championship, the second from top-tier league in the English rugby union system and are thus one of the top 24 sides in the country. The Rugby Club has over 1000 registered members, fields teams from every age group from U6's up to U18's. They also have 2 ladies sides and 6 adult men sides. Ampthill Town Cricket Club has been established since 1890 and currently have teams playing in the Hertfordshire league and the Bedfordshire league putting out at least four teams on Saturdays and Sunday. They also host a Bedfordshire CCC match yearly and host an annual friendly game with London Zoo. Their home is in Ampthill Great Park with a clubhouse and scorebox near the west carpark.

Ampthill also has a very popular and active Bowls Club, off Brinsmade Road and accessed through the attractive Kings Arms Path Gardens. The club celebrated its centenary in 2019, and has a llama as its emblem, representing the zoo owned by club founder, Sir Anthony Wingfield. All ages and abilities welcomed.

The Greensand Ridge Walk and the Greensand Cycle Way pass through the lower end of the town.

There is a Center Parcs site at Warren Wood to the west of Ampthill.

== Culture and community ==
Ampthill formerly hosted its own annual festival weekend in the summer. This event included two music events: a live rock music event "AmpRocks", which hosted acts such as Razorlight and Toploader, and the "Ampthill Park Proms", where classical music was performed by bands such as Ampthill Orchestra, Ampthill Band and Redborne Jazz Band from the local upper school. This event was held in Ampthill Great Park, where a temporary soundstage was erected to entertain local residents.

The event also included the Ampthill Gala, which began with a parade of floats around the town, built and staffed by people from the local schools and communities. The parade ended at Ampthill Cricket Club, located just outside of Ampthill Great Park, where a variety of stalls set up by local charities and businesses could be found, as well as a number of fairground attractions.

The Ampthill Festival was first held in 1981 and was held annually with some exceptions. In 2023 the event was cancelled due to adverse weather conditions and as a result the company behind the festival, Ampthill Festival CIC, entered administration due to a lack of funding and the event was permanently cancelled in 2024.

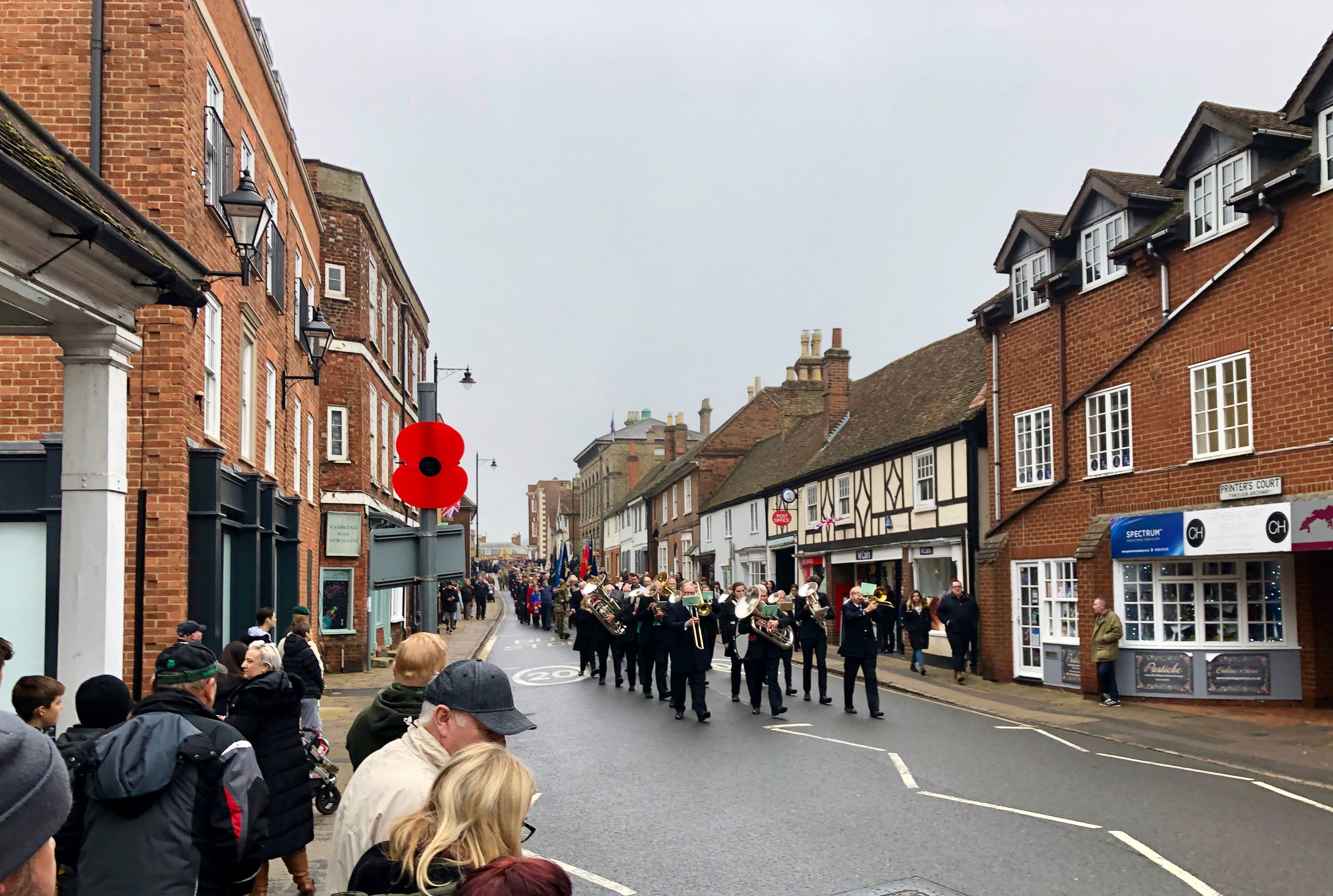
Ampthill Town Remembrance Day Parade 14 November 2021

The annual Remembrance Day parade takes place, commencing at St Andrews Church, passing through the town streets, down the Alameda walk to the Cenotaph war memorial. The parade includes marchers representing all the services and civilian organisations of Ampthill who each leave a wreath on the memorial.

Ampthill has a high concentration of public amenities, including schools, doctors surgeries, a fire and ambulance station.

As part of Central Bedfordshire, Ampthill's schools are organised in a three-tier system. There are two lower schools (Russell and The Firs), one middle school (Alameda) and one upper school, Redborne, which is shared with the neighbouring town of Flitwick.

=== Cultural references ===
Ampthill Park was the burial place for the golden hare in the Kit Williams treasure hunt Masquerade near the cross-shaped monument to Queen Catherine of Aragon, at the precise spot touched by the tip of the monument's shadow at noon on the day of either the March or September equinox.

== Media ==
Local news and television programmes are provided by BBC East and ITV Anglia. Television signals are received from the nearby Sandy Heath TV transmitter.

Local radio stations are BBC Three Counties Radio on 95.5 FM, Heart East on 96.9 FM, In2beats on 106.5 FM, and Bedford Radio, a community based radio station which broadcast online.

The town is served by the local newspaper, Bedford Today (formerly Times & Citizen).

== Transport ==
Ampthill is located along the A507, which links to the M1 to the west and the A6 to the east.

Grant Palmer provides frequent bus services to Bedford and Flitwick, along with less frequent services to Milton Keynes, Dunstable, and several smaller villages surrounding the town.

The Bedfordshire Railway & Transport Association is campaigning for the reopening of Ampthill railway station which closed in 1959. The nearest railway station is Flitwick railway station approximately 2.5 km (1.6 miles) south of Ampthill.

The nearest airport is London Luton Airport, which is accessible by Thameslink train via Flitwick to Luton Airport Parkway railway stations.

== Notable buildings ==
=== St Andrew's Church of England ===
The church of St Andrew ranges in date from Early English to Perpendicular. It contains a monument to Richard Nicolls (1624–1672), an Ampthill native, who, under the patronage of the Duke of York, brother to Charles II, to whom the king had granted the Dutch North American colony of New Netherland, received the submission of its chief town, New Amsterdam, in 1664, and became its first English governor, the town taking the name of New York. Nicolls perished in the action between the English and Dutch fleets at the Battle of Solebay off the Suffolk coast, and the cannonball which killed him is preserved on his tomb. The church also contains a ring of eight bells. There were six until 1981, when the two new bells were installed. Services run weekly, with Sung Eucharist at 9.30am and Evensong at 6.30pm on Sundays. The church has a regular 4-part choir, which has sung morning and evening services for over 100 years.

=== Houghton House ===
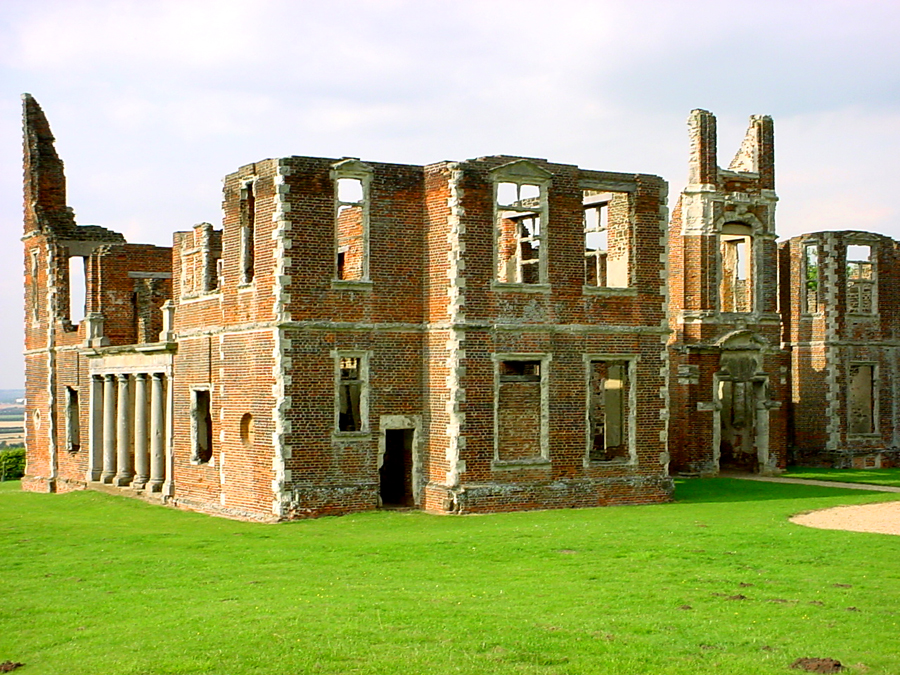
Houghton House

Houghton House was built in 1621 by Mary, Countess of Pembroke and sister of the poet Sir Philip Sidney. In 1675, the house may have provided the inspiration for 'House Beautiful' in John Bunyan's The Pilgrim's Progress. It is thought that Bunyan's work is loosely based on his own journey between Bedford and Luton, and the steep slope leading into Ampthill could have been the model for the 'Hill of Difficulty'. Houghton House passed to the Duke of Bedford in 1738 and became a ruin after the removal of the roof in 1794.

== Notable people ==
- Sir Anthony Wingfield (1857 - 1952) who lived in Ampthill House (demolished in 1953). Sir Anthony served as High Sheriff of Bedfordshire and was known for keeping a menagerie of animals including cheetahs, sloth bears, barbary rams, llamas, ostriches and camels. In 1939, the outbreak of war necessitated the disposal of this private zoo and the animals were relocated to Whipsnade zoo which Sir Anthony had helped to establish a few years earlier. The site of Ampthill House 52.0313°N 0.4889°W was developed for housing along Church Avenue, with the site adjacent to the Wingfield Club of which Sir Anthony was president.
- Notable 20th-century architect Sir Albert Richardson lived in Ampthill from 1919 until his death in 1964 at Avenue House, 20 Church Street. Among his last projects was the building that housed Mid Bedfordshire District Council (formerly the Ampthill Rural District Council offices) until August 2006, at 12 Dunstable Street (1963–1965).
- Brian Clemens, screenwriter and producer of many famous action/adventure TV series including The Avengers and The Professionals lived at Park Farm until his death in January 2015. One episode of The Avengers, "Noon Doomsday", was filmed there in July 1968.
- Raymond Austin AKA Raymond DeVere-Austin Baron of Delvin, film and television director, screenwriter, novelist and producer of many action/adventure TV series including The Avengers and The Professionals reactivated Elizabethan cottage in Millbrook and lived there for many years until he moved to America in 1969 where he directed and produced many American TV shows. He was a known philanthropist and benefactor in Bedfordshire.
- Lewis Ludlow, Gloucester Rugby back-row forward, also originally hails from Ampthill.
- Ben Chilwell, Chelsea and England footballer, was raised in Ampthill.
- Robert Daws, the actor, has lived in the town for many years with his wife, actress and singer Amy Robbins.
- Richard Nicolls, the first governor of the province of New York, was born in Ampthill.
- Cathrine of Aragon resided in Ampthill castle during her divorce from King Henry Viii

== Twin towns ==
Ampthill is twinned with Nissan-lez-Enserune, France.

== See also ==
- Sport in Bedfordshire
- Baron Ampthill
- Ampthill Square Estate in London, named after Ampthill
