= Lewis Ludlow =

England international rugby union player

- Born: Lewis Wyndham Ludlow; 11 September 1994 (age 32) Bedford, England
- Height: 1.91 m (6 ft 3 in)
- Weight: 102 kg (16 st 1 lb)
- School: Redborne Upper School; Hartpury College

Rugby union career
- Position: Flanker
- Current team: Gloucester Rugby
Senior career
Years	Team	Apps	(Points)
2015–	Gloucester Rugby	251	(130)
- Correct as of 7 Dec 2025
International career
Years	Team	Apps	(Points)
2013	England U18	4	(0)
2021–	England	2	(0)
- Correct as of 10 July 2021

Lewis Ludlow (born 11 September 1994) is an English professional rugby union player who plays as a flanker for Gloucester.

== Club career ==
Ludlow joined the academy of Gloucester Rugby at the age of 17. In November 2013, Ludlow made his Gloucester debut in a friendly against Japan and competitive debut in an Anglo-Welsh Cup fixture against the Scarlets, suffering a knee injury which ruled him out of the 2014 Junior World Cup.

He was a member of the Gloucester squad that lost consecutive European Rugby Challenge Cup finals to Stade Français in 2017 and Cardiff Blues in 2018. In November 2020 it was announced that he was the new club captain at Gloucester. He will remain as club captain for the 2021–22 season.

== International career ==
In the summer of 2013 Ludlow represented England under-18 on their tour of South Africa. He had also been eligible for Wales qualifying through a grandfather.

In October 2020 Ludlow was called up to a senior England training squad by head coach Eddie Jones. On 4 July 2021 Ludlow made his Test debut for England against the United States at Twickenham and became the fifth player in history to captain England on his debut. He also captained the following weekend against Canada and subsequently received a four-game suspension for foul play during this match.
