= Flitwick railway station =

Railway station in Bedfordshire, England

Flitwick
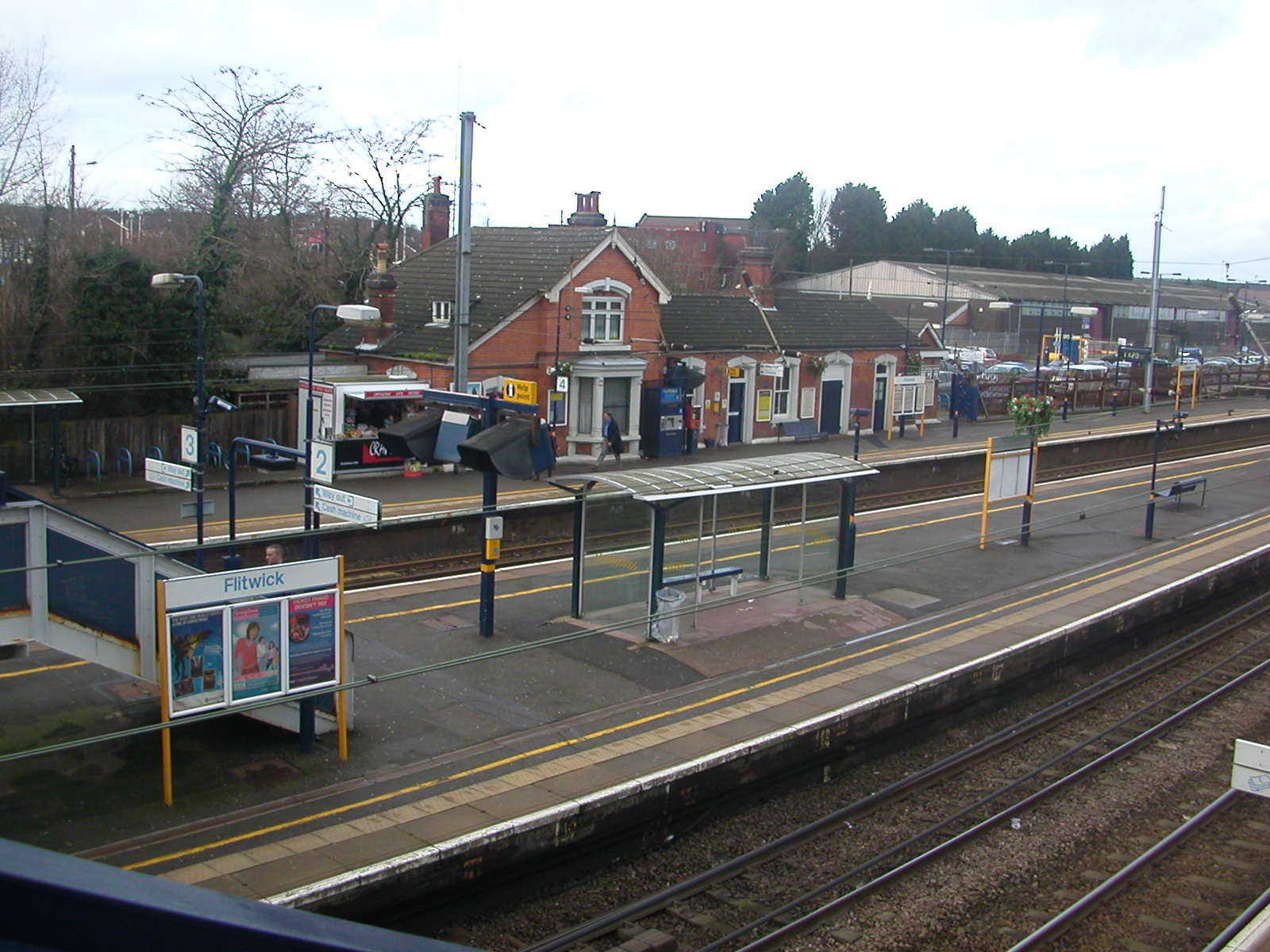
- View across Flitwick station towards the main building on the Down side, 13 January 2007

General information
- Location: Flitwick, District of Central Bedfordshire; England
- Coordinates: 52.004°N 0.495°W
- Grid reference: TL034350
- Manager: Thameslink
- Platforms: 4

Other information
- Station code: FLT
- Classification: DfT category D

Passengers
- 2020/21: ▼0.297 million
- 2021/22: ▲0.829 million
- 2022/23: ▲1.090 million
- 2023/24: ▲1.207 million
- 2024/25: ▲1.277 million
Location
Notes
- Passenger statistics from the Office of Rail and Road

Flitwick railway station is in the centre of Flitwick, in Bedfordshire, England. The station is situated on the Midland Main Line. The station is managed by Thameslink, who operate all trains serving it, and is served by Thameslink route services between Bedford and Brighton. As well as Flitwick itself, the station also serves the adjoining town of Ampthill, which no longer has its own station.

From Flitwick, trains travel north and serve Bedford and southbound trains serve Luton, Luton Airport Parkway, Harpenden, St Albans, London St Pancras, Gatwick Airport and Brighton.

== History ==
It was built by the Midland Railway in 1870 on its extension to St. Pancras. The original station buildings were restored in the early 1980s.

There were originally platforms for two lines. This remained the case when the line was quadrupled. The up goods opened in 1893 and extended to Harlington in 1894; and the down goods opened in 1895. It was not until 1960 that British Railways added extra platforms to cater for extended stopping services between Bedford and London.

=== Stationmasters ===
- William Hodgkinson 1870 - 1873
- G. Bowles 1873 - 1875
- George Croft 1875 - 1884
- Thomas Edward Bowers 1884 - 1886
- Simeon Marshall 1886 - 1891
- Sheron Morton 1891 - 1894
- G.J. Best 1894 - 1898
- Frederick Brookes 1898 - 1902 (formerly station master at Southill)
- William George Hall 1902 - 1926 (formerly station master at Henlow Camp)
- F.J. Newell until 1929 (afterwards station master at Poplar)
- Harry Ariss from 1929 (formerly station master of Claydon)

== Services ==
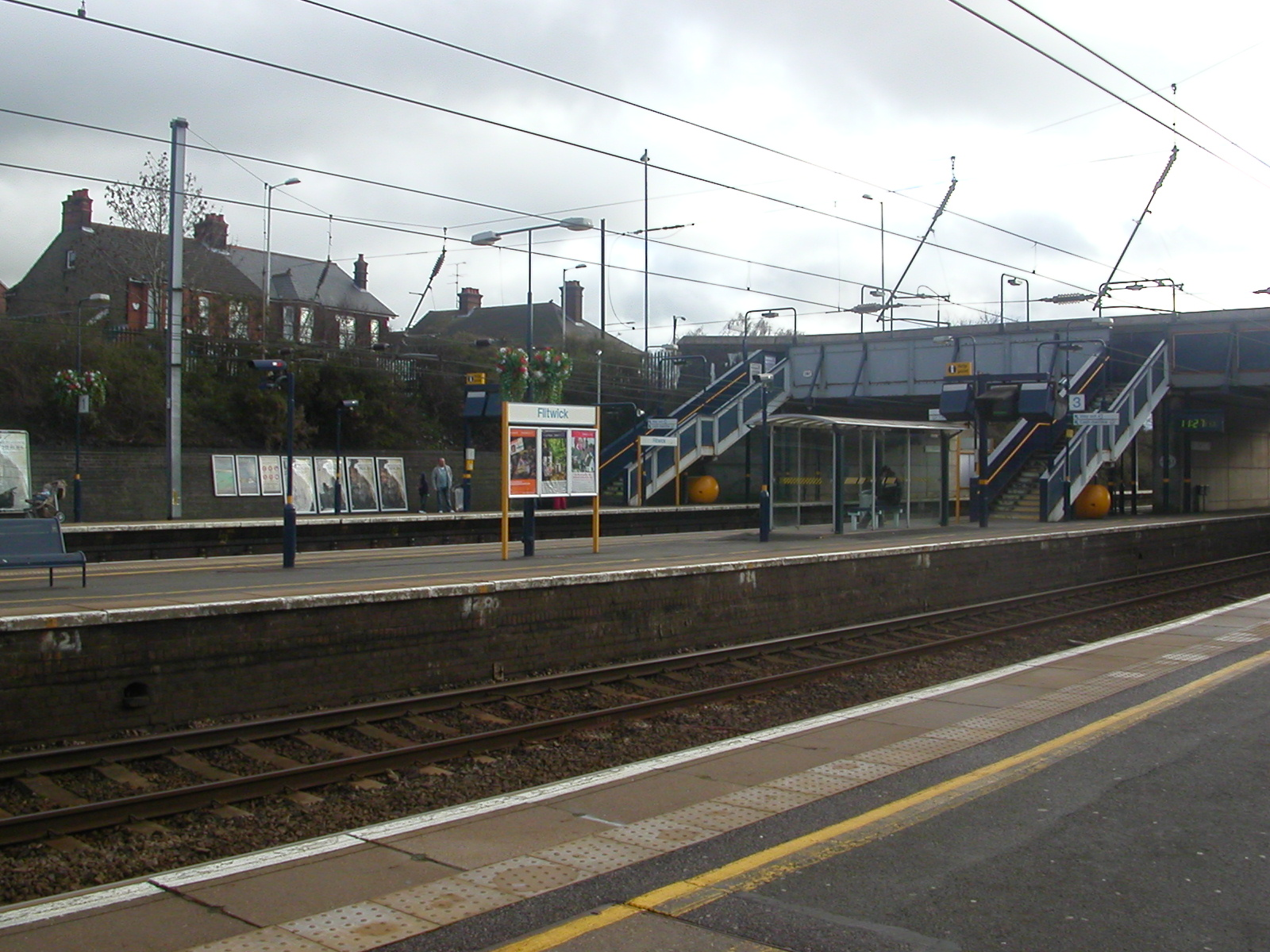
Looking south towards the footbridge, from outside the main building on Platform 4

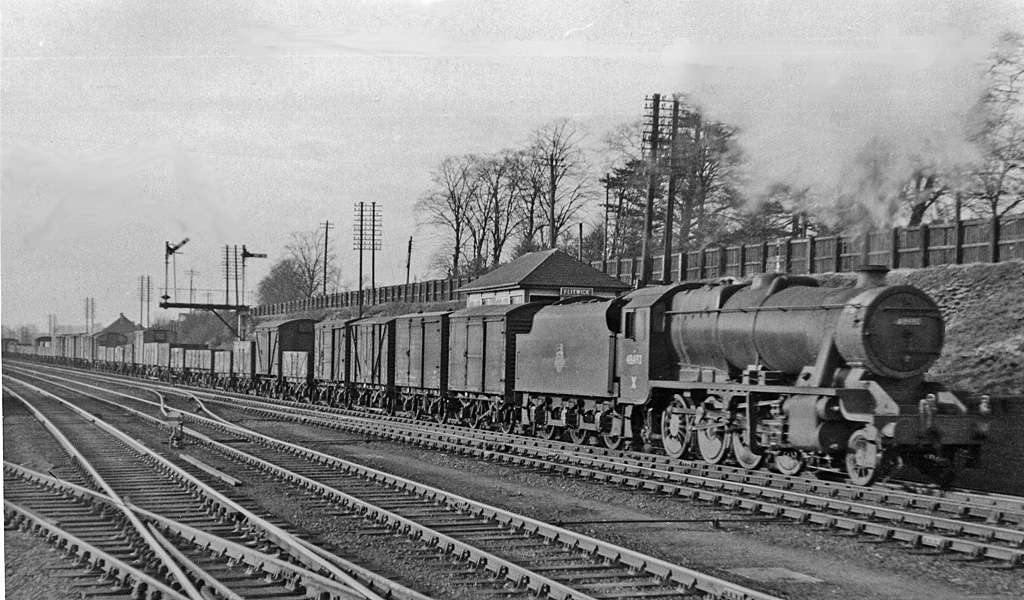
Up direction freight at Flitwick in 1955

All services at Flitwick are operated by Thameslink using Class 700 EMUs.

The typical off-peak service in trains per hour is:

- 4 tph to Bedford
- 2 tph to Brighton
- 2 tph to Three Bridges via Redhill

During the peak hours, the station is served by additional services to and from Rainham, Sutton, East Grinstead. Many peak hour services run nonstop between Flitwick and Luton.

The station is also served by a half-hourly night service between Bedford and Three Bridges on Sunday to Friday nights.

Preceding station	National Rail	Following station
Bedford	Thameslink Thameslink	Harlington
Bedford	Thameslink Thameslink	Luton Peak Hours Only
	Historical railways	
Ampthill Line open, station closed	Midland Railway Midland Main Line	Harlington Line and station open

== Facilities ==
Flitwick station has a waiting room, take away cafe, telephones, toilet and a car park.

The station has the PlusBus scheme where train and bus tickets can be bought together at a saving. It is in the same area as Harlington station.

There is now only one entrance to the station: through the ticket office from Steppingley Road. The previous second entrance, situated directly onto the footbridge from Dunstable Road, which in 2016 had gates installed, is now permanently closed.
