= Ampthill railway station =

Disused railway station in Ampthill, Bedfordshire

Coordinates: 52.02352°N 0.51124°W

Ampthill
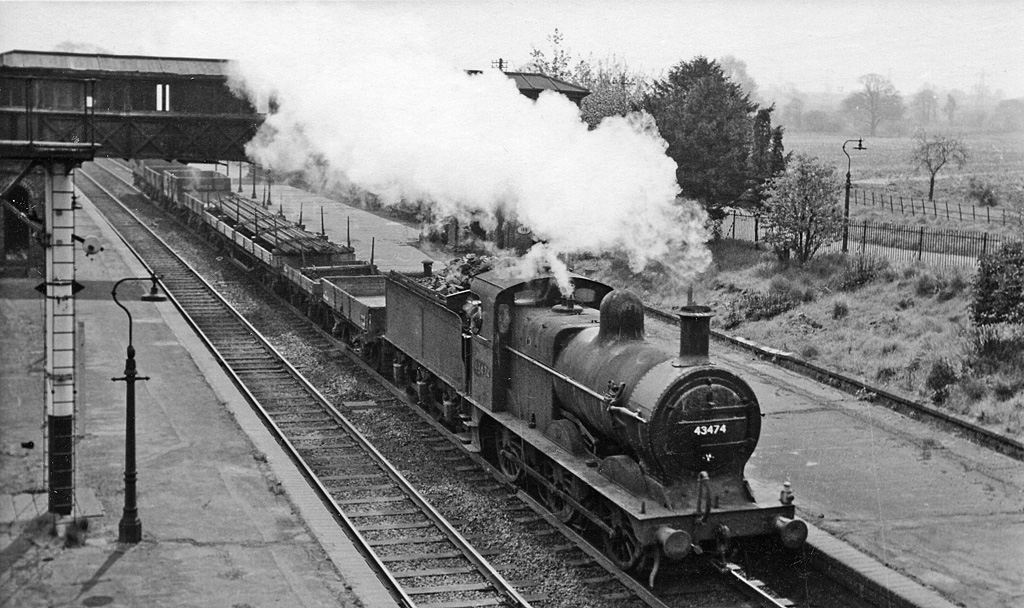
- Ampthill Station remains, with a Down goods passing in 1960

General information
- Location: Ampthill, Central Bedfordshire; England
- Grid reference: TL022371
- Platforms: 2

Other information
- Status: Disused

History
- Original company: Midland Railway
- Post-grouping: London Midland and Scottish Railway; London Midland Region of British Railways

Key dates
- 15 July 1868: Opened
- 4 May 1959: Closed
Location

Ampthill railway station was built over 1 mile (1.6 km) from the historic market town of Ampthill in the English county of Bedfordshire by the Midland Railway in 1868 on its extension to St. Pancras.

== History ==
Opened by the Midland Railway, it became part of the London, Midland and Scottish Railway during the Grouping of 1923. After passing on to the London Midland Region of British Railways upon nationalisation in 1948, it was then closed by the British Transport Commission.

At the time it was built there were no coaching connections by road, so for a number of years the station was particularly beneficial in providing an outlet for the trade in straw hats, Ampthill's speciality being the "Narrow Improved" version. The station closed in 1959 and the inhabitants were advised to use the "excellent alternative bus service."

About half a mile north of the station is Ampthill Tunnel, increased to two bores when the line was upgraded to four tracks in 1891.

=== Stationmasters ===
- James W Yaxley 1870 - 1875
- F. Tomblin 1875 - 1880
- John William Brookes 1880 - 1882
- Joseph Minney 1882 - 1898
- George Bailey 1898 - 1908
- Robert Henry Turner 1908 - ca. 1914
- O.P. Pitman ca. 1931 - 1937
- H.R. Ross until 1947
- W.T. Abrahams 1949–1953

Preceding station	Historical railways	Following station
Bedford Midland; Line and station open	Midland Railway; Midland Main Line	Flitwick; Line and station open

== Present and future ==
Trains on the Midland Main Line, electrified through the former station, still pass the site.

The area in which Ampthill station was situated is still visible today due to the widening of tracks where the now long gone platforms used to be.

The Bedfordshire Railway & Transport Association is campaigning for the reopening of a station at Ampthill.

== Sources ==
- Butt, R. V. J. (October 1995). The Directory of Railway Stations: details every public and private passenger station, halt, platform and stopping place, past and present (1st ed.). Sparkford: Patrick Stephens Ltd. ISBN 978-1-85260-508-7. OCLC 60251199. OL 11956311M.
- Jowett, Alan (2000). Jowett's Nationalised Railway Atlas (1st ed.). Penryn, Cornwall: Atlantic Transport Publishers. ISBN 978-0-906899-99-1. OCLC 228266687.
