= In2beats =

In2beats 106.5 FM
- England
- Broadcast area: Bedford
- Frequencies: FM: 106.5 MHz; DAB: 9C (Bedford)

Programming
- Format: Urban / dance Music

History
- First air date: 23 April 2011

Links
- Website: in2beatsradio.com

In2beats 106.5 FM, also known as simply In2beats, is a UK community radio station primarily playing urban and dance music, broadcasting on 106.5 FM and DAB to Bedford and surrounding areas, and online.

The roots of In2beats can partly be traced back to Risk FM, a pirate radio station that broadcast in Bedford from 1999 until 2003, and Intobeats, its first incarnation as an internet radio station between 2007 and 2011.

In October 2008, Intobeats announced that it was applying for a community radio licence, which it was successful in its bid for in May 2009. It commenced legal broadcasting in April 2011.
