= Ampthill Tunnel =

Railway tunnel in Bedfordshire, England

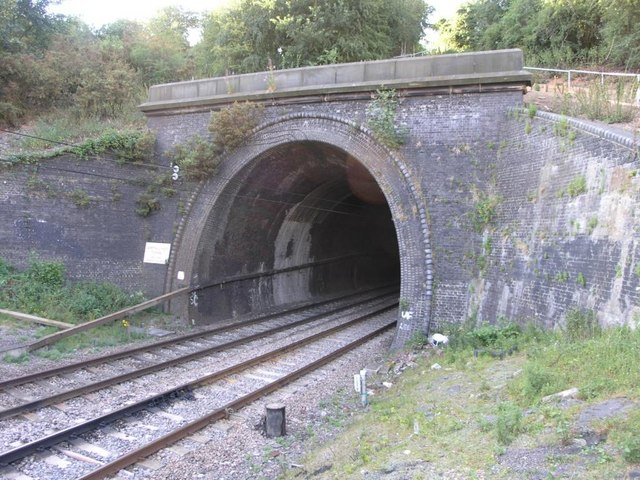
- Ampthill Tunnel
- Interactive map of Ampthill Tunnel

Overview
- Line: Midland Main Line
- Location: Ampthill, Bedfordshire
- Coordinates: 52°02′01″N 0°30′48″W

Operation
- Work began: 1865
- Opened: 1868
- Owner: Network Rail

Technical
- Length: 759 yards (694 m)

Ampthill tunnel is a railway tunnel at Ampthill on the Midland Main Line, being positioned between Bedford and Flitwick. It consists of two separate bores, each one accommodating double-track throughout.

The first Ampthill Tunnel was built during the 1860s; growing demand on the line led to the original double-track configuration being inadequate for further growth. Thus, during the 1890s, a second Ampthill Tunnel was constructed directly alongside, facilitating the Midland Railway's expansion plans of running a quadruple-track arrangement between Kettering and London wherever practical to do so. Both bores have remained active through to the present day. During mid 2012, Ampthill Tunnel was subject to a series of high speed evaluation runs, including a record maximum speed for the route of 125 miles per hour (201 km/h); in the following year, the line speeds were increased to 125 mph along much of the Midland Main Line.

== History ==
The Ampthill Tunnel was constructed during the mid 1860s on behalf of the Midland Railway to convey what would become the Midland Main Line. It was necessary to traverse a hill on the outskirts of the town of Ampthill, the summit of which was reported to be 88 yards (80 m) above the level of the railway. The local geology that the tunnel was bored through, which largely consisted of Oxford clay, was found to contain numerous fossils; a number of these were recovered during the excavations for the tunnel and subsequently studied.

By the 1890s, company officials had recognised that, due to a lack of free capacity for running further services, an expansion programme was required for the Midland Main Line, which primarily involved its widening from two tracks to four along much of the route between Kettering and London. In accordance with this policy, between June 1893 and 1895, a second Ampthill Tunnel was constructed alongside the first bore. As it was determined to be impracticable to drive a bore between the faces due to the lengthy cuttings on either side for the operating line, the additional tunnel was instead entirely excavated from three shafts that were sunk from above. The completed second tunnel had a length of 717 yards (656 m); this was slightly shorter than the original tunnel, which reportedly possessed a length of 759 yards (694 m).

On 1 July 2012, a new record maximum speed for the Midland Main Line was established by a British Rail Class 222 diesel multiple unit (DMU), which traversed Ampthill Tunnel at a speed of 125 miles per hour (201 km/h); the tunnel was closely monitored by engineers to evaluate the effects of the pressure waves generated by the train's speed run. Having found the conditions imposed acceptable, numerous stretches of the line were cleared for trains to regularly run at the elevated maximum speed of 125 mph, including Ampthill Tunnel.
