= Redborne Upper School and Community College =

Coordinates: 52.019°N 0.497°W

Redborne Upper School & Community College

Location
- Flitwick Road; Ampthill, Bedfordshire, MK45 2NU; England

Information
- Type: Academy
- Religious affiliation: None
- Local authority: Central Bedfordshire
- Department for Education URN: 136559 Tables
- Ofsted: Reports
- Headteacher: Olly Button
- Gender: Coeducational
- Age: 13 to 18
- Sixth form students: 450
- Average class size: 17.9
- Hours in school day: 5
- Colours: Black & Red
- Website: http://www.redbornecommunitycollege.com

Redborne Upper School & Community College is an academy school and sixth form located in Ampthill, Bedfordshire, England. The school serves the population of Ampthill, Flitwick and surrounding villages.

Redborne is a designated training school. As a training school the school offers a postgraduate programme as well as a Graduate Teacher Programme, and an Access to Education Scheme. Through this the school has links with the University of Bedfordshire, Oxford Brookes University and Bedford College.

In July 2019, the school was awarded an Artsmark gold award from Arts Council England. The award is in recognition of the school's excellence in arts education.

The school was previously a specialist Sports College, however on 1 April 2011, the school formally gained academy status.

The school also has a working farm allowing a qualification in agriculture.

As of 2019, the school's most recent Ofsted judgement was Good (2017).

== Notable former pupils ==
- Ben Chilwell – professional footballer for Chelsea and the England national team.
- Ryan Owens - former track cyclist who represented Great Britain and England in the Tokyo 2020 Olympic Games.
