= List of Belgian football transfers winter 2015–16 =

This is a list of Belgian football transfers for the 2015-16 winter transfer window. Only transfers involving a team from the Belgian Pro League are listed.

The winter transfer window opens on 1 January 2016, although a few transfers may take place prior to that date. The window closes at midnight on 1 February 2016 although outgoing transfers might still happen to leagues in which the window is still open. Players without a club may join teams, either during or in between transfer windows.

== Sorted by date ==
=== November 2015 ===
Date	Name	Moving from	Moving to	Fee	Note
November 26, 2015	(Montenegro) Balša Peličić	(Belgium) Mouscron-Péruwelz	Free Agent	Contract terminated	
November 27, 2015	(Chinese Taipei) Xavier Chen	(China) Guizhou Renhe	(Belgium) Mechelen	Free	

=== December 2015 ===
Date	Name	Moving from	Moving to	Fee	Note
December 8, 2015	(Denmark) Henrik Dalsgaard	(Denmark) AaB	(Belgium) Zulte Waregem	Free	
December 11, 2015	(Nigeria) Peter Olayinka	(Albania) Skënderbeu Korçë	(Belgium) Gent	Undisclosed	
December 16, 2015	(Belgium) Robin Henkens	Free Agent	(Belgium) Westerlo	NA	
December 17, 2015	(France) Jean Calvé	Free Agent	(Belgium) OH Leuven	NA	
December 17, 2015	(Norway) Gustav Wikheim	(Norway) Strømsgodset	(Belgium) Gent	Undisclosed	
December 23, 2015	(Belgium) Guillaume Gillet	(Belgium) Anderlecht	(France) Nantes	Undisclosed	
December 23, 2015	(United States) Shane O'Neill	(Belgium) Mouscron-Péruwelz	(Cyprus) Apollon Limassol	Loan Return	
December 23, 2015	(France) Kevin Tapoko	(Belgium) OH Leuven	Free Agent	Contract terminated by mutual consent	
December 27, 2015	(France) Ludovic Butelle	(France) Angers	(Belgium) Club Brugge	Undisclosed	
December 27, 2015	(Belgium) Mathieu Cornet	(Belgium) Oostende	(Belgium) Antwerp	Undisclosed	
December 27, 2015	(France) Baptiste Schmisser	(Belgium) Oostende	(Belgium) Antwerp	Undisclosed	
December 28, 2015	(France) Xavier Luissint	(Belgium) Oostende	(Belgium) Cercle Brugge	Undisclosed	
December 28, 2015	(Belgium) Julien Vercauteren	(France) Nice	(Belgium) Westerlo	Loan	
December 29, 2015	(Brazil) Kanu	(Portugal) Vitória Guimarães	(Belgium) OH Leuven	Undisclosed	(Note: Kanu was on loan from Vitória Guimarães to Vitória. The loan ended and Kanu was sold to OH Leuven.)
December 31, 2015	(Belgium) Siebe Schrijvers	(Belgium) Genk	(Belgium) Waasland-Beveren	Loan	

=== January 2016 ===
Date	Name	Moving from	Moving to	Fee	Note
January 1, 2016	(Ukraine) Ruslan Malinovskyi	(Ukraine) Shakhtar Donetsk	(Belgium) Genk	Loan	(Note: Malinovskyi was on loan from Shakhtar Donetsk to Zorya Luhansk. The loan ended and Malinovskyi was loaned to Genk.)
January 2, 2016	(Belgium) Bjorn Ruytinx	(Belgium) Oostende	(Belgium) Beerschot Wilrijk	Undisclosed	
January 3, 2016	(Mali) Ousseynou Cissé	(Spain) Rayo Vallecano	(Belgium) Waasland-Beveren	Loan	
January 3, 2016	(France) Lucas Déaux	(France) Nantes	(Belgium) Gent	Undisclosed	
January 3, 2016	(Belgium) Alexis De Sart	(Belgium) Standard Liège	(Belgium) Sint-Truiden	Undisclosed	
January 3, 2016	(France) Kevin Tapoko	Free Agent	(Belgium) Mouscron-Péruwelz	NA	
January 4, 2016	(Senegal) Simon Diedhiou	(Norway) Haugesund	(Belgium) Gent	Undisclosed	
January 4, 2016	(France) Damien Dussaut	(Belgium) Standard Liège	(Belgium) Sint-Truiden	Undisclosed	
January 4, 2016	(Belgium) Edmilson	(Belgium) Sint-Truiden	(Belgium) Standard Liège	Undisclosed	
January 4, 2016	(Belgium) Miguel Mees	(Belgium) Mechelen	(Belgium) Heist	Loan	
January 4, 2016	(Democratic Republic of the Congo) Lionel Nshole	(Belgium) Mechelen	(Belgium) Heist	Loan	
January 4, 2016	(Finland) Jere Uronen	(Sweden) Helsingborg	(Belgium) Genk	Undisclosed	
January 4, 2016	(Belgium) Jules van Cleemput	(Belgium) Mechelen	(Belgium) Heist	Loan	
January 4, 2016	(Guinea) Mohamed Yattara	(Belgium) Standard Liège	(France) Angers	Loan	
January 5, 2016	(Peru) Cristian Benavente	(England) Milton Keynes Dons	(Belgium) Charleroi	Free	
January 6, 2016	(Chile) Nicolás Castillo	(Belgium) Club Brugge	(Chile) CD Universidad Católica	Loan	(Note: Castillo was on loan from Club Brugge to Frosinone. The loan was terminated and instead Castillo was loaned to CD Universidad Católica.)
January 6, 2016	(Cameroon) Serge Tabekou	(Belgium) Gent	(France) Sedan	Loan	
January 7, 2016	(France) Jean-Luc Dompé	(Belgium) Sint-Truiden	(Belgium) Standard Liège	Undisclosed	
January 7, 2016	(France) Anthony Knockaert	(Belgium) Standard Liège	(England) Brighton & Hove Albion	Undisclosed	
January 7, 2016	(Serbia) Miloš Kosanović	(Belgium) Mechelen	(Belgium) Standard Liège	Undisclosed	
January 8, 2016	(Brazil) Rafael Galhardo	(Brazil) Santos	(Belgium) Anderlecht	Undisclosed	
January 8, 2016	(Belgium) Andy Kawaya	(Belgium) Anderlecht	(Netherlands) Willem II	Loan	
January 8, 2016	(Belgium) Baptiste Ulens	(Belgium) Kortrijk	(Belgium) Tubize	Loan	
January 9, 2016	(Brazil) Gabriel Boschilia	(France) Monaco	(Belgium) Standard Liège	Loan	
January 9, 2016	(Spain) Víctor Vázquez	(Belgium) Club Brugge	(Mexico) Cruz Azul	Undisclosed	
January 10, 2016	(Serbia) Aleksandar Bjelica	(Netherlands) Helmond Sport	(Belgium) Mechelen	Undisclosed	
January 11, 2016	(Denmark) Jesper Jørgensen	(Belgium) Zulte Waregem	(Denmark) Esbjerg	Undisclosed	
January 11, 2016	(Belgium) Faysel Kasmi	(Belgium) Standard Liège	(Belgium) Lierse	Loan Return	
January 11, 2016	(Belgium) David Vandenbroeck	(Belgium) OH Leuven	(Luxembourg) Differdange	Free	
January 12, 2016	(Belgium) Yassine El Ghanassy	(Norway) Stabæk	(Belgium) Oostende	Undisclosed	
January 12, 2016	(Greece) Nikos Karelis	(Greece) Panathinaikos	(Belgium) Genk	Undisclosed	
January 12, 2016	(Georgia (country)) Tornike Okriashvili	(Belgium) Genk	(Turkey) Eskişehirspor	Loan	
January 12, 2016	(Serbia) Marko Poletanović	(Belgium) Gent	(Belgium) Zulte Waregem	Loan	
January 12, 2016	(Ivory Coast) Yaya Soumahoro	(Belgium) Gent	(Belgium) Sint-Truiden	Undisclosed	
January 13, 2016	(France) Adrian Adam	(Belgium) Charleroi	(Belgium) Seraing United	Loan	(Note: Adam was on loan from Charleroi to Patro Eisden Maasmechelen. The loan was terminated and instead Adam was loaned to Seraing United.)
January 13, 2016	(Belgium) Alessandro Ciranni	(Belgium) Genk	(Netherlands) MVV	Loan	
January 13, 2016	(France) Aboubakar Kamara	(Belgium) Kortrijk	(France) Amiens	Undisclosed	
January 13, 2016	(France) Xavier Mercier	(France) Boulogne	(Belgium) Kortrijk	Undisclosed	
January 13, 2016	(Serbia) Nikola Petković	(Belgium) Westerlo	Free Agent	Contract terminated by mutual consent	
January 13, 2016	(Belgium) Jarne Vrijsen	(Belgium) Genk	(Netherlands) MVV	Loan	
January 14, 2016	(France) Pierre-Baptiste Baherlé	(Belgium) Sint-Truiden	Free Agent	Contract terminated by mutual consent	
January 14, 2016	(Brazil) João Carlos	(Brazil) Vasco da Gama	(Belgium) Lokeren	Undisclosed	
January 14, 2016	(Ivory Coast) Igor Lolo	(Russia) Rostov	(Belgium) Westerlo	Free	
January 15, 2016	(Argentina) Valentín Viola	(Cyprus) Apollon Limassol	(Belgium) Mouscron-Péruwelz	Loan	
January 16, 2016	(Cameroon) Collins Fai	(Romania) Dinamo Bucharest	(Belgium) Standard Liège	Undisclosed	
January 17, 2016	(Belgium) Jelle Van Damme	(Belgium) Standard Liège	(United States) LA Galaxy	Undisclosed	
January 17, 2016	(Kazakhstan) Georgy Zhukov	(Belgium) Standard Liège	(Netherlands) Roda JC	Loan	(Note: Zhukov was on loan from Standard Liège to Astana. The loan was terminated and instead Zhukov was loaned to Roda JC.)
January 18, 2016	(Brazil) Allan	(England) Liverpool	(Belgium) Sint-Truiden	Loan	
January 18, 2016	(Bosnia and Herzegovina) Haris Hajradinović	(Belgium) Gent	(Norway) Haugesund	Loan	
January 18, 2016	(Sweden) Erik Johansson	(Belgium) Gent	(Denmark) Copenhagen	Undisclosed	
January 18, 2016	(Greece) Sotiris Ninis	(Greece) Panathinaikos	(Belgium) Charleroi	Undisclosed	
January 19, 2016	(Portugal) Jorge Teixeira	(Belgium) Standard Liège	(England) Charlton Athletic	Undisclosed	
January 20, 2016	(Central African Republic) Hilaire Momi	(Belgium) Sint-Truiden	(Belgium) Seraing United	Loan	
January 20, 2016	(Serbia) Fejsal Mulić	(Germany) 1860 München	(Belgium) Mouscron-Péruwelz	Undisclosed	
January 20, 2016	(France) Benoît Poulain	(Belgium) Kortrijk	(Belgium) Club Brugge	Undisclosed	
January 20, 2016	(Mali) Falaye Sacko	(Belgium) Sint-Truiden	(Hungary) Újpest	Loan Return	
January 20, 2016	(Cameroon) Fabien Tchenkoua	(France) Nîmes	(Belgium) Sint-Truiden	Undisclosed	
January 21, 2016	(Uganda) Farouk Miya	(Uganda) Vipers	(Belgium) Standard Liège	Loan	
January 21, 2016	(Nigeria) Michael Olaitan	(Greece) Olympiacos	(Belgium) Kortrijk	Loan	
January 22, 2016	(Latvia) Valērijs Šabala	(Belgium) Club Brugge	(Czech Republic) Příbram	Loan	(Note: Šabala was on loan from Club Brugge to Miedź Legnica. The loan was terminated and instead Sabala was loaned to Příbram.)
January 24, 2016	(Slovenia) Martin Milec	(Belgium) Standard Liège	(Netherlands) Roda JC	Loan	
January 24, 2016	(Spain) Víctor Valdés	(England) Manchester United	(Belgium) Standard Liège	Loan	
January 25, 2016	(Serbia) Filip Đuričić	(Portugal) Benfica	(Belgium) Anderlecht	Loan	
January 25, 2016	(Belgium) Hervé Matthys	(Belgium) Anderlecht	(Belgium) Westerlo	Loan	
January 25, 2016	(Belgium) Rob Schoofs	(Belgium) Sint-Truiden	(Belgium) Gent	Undisclosed	
January 26, 2016	(Senegal) Elimane Coulibaly	(Belgium) Oostende	(Belgium) Mouscron-Péruwelz	Loan	
January 26, 2016	(Togo) Mathieu Dossevi	(Greece) Olympiacos	(Belgium) Standard Liège	Undisclosed	(Note: Dossevi was on loan from Olympiacos to Standard Liège. Standard and Olympiacos agreed to make the deal permanent.)
January 26, 2016	(Costa Rica) Óscar Duarte	(Belgium) Club Brugge	(Spain) Espanyol	Undisclosed	
January 26, 2016	(Belgium) Pieter Gerkens	(Belgium) Genk	(Belgium) Sint-Truiden	Undisclosed	
January 26, 2016	(Belgium) Benito Raman	(Belgium) Gent	(Belgium) Sint-Truiden	Loan	
January 26, 2016	(Belgium) Dylan Seys	(Belgium) Club Brugge	(Israel) Hapoel Acre	Loan	
January 27, 2016	(France) Frédéric Brillant	(Belgium) Oostende	(United States) New York City	Undisclosed	
January 27, 2016	(Morocco) Ahmed El Messaoudi	(Belgium) Lierse	(Belgium) Mechelen	Loan	(Note: El Messaoudi was on loan from Lierse to Standard Liège. The loan was terminated and instead El Messaoudi was loaned to Mechelen.)
January 27, 2016	(Mali) Sambou Yatabaré	(Belgium) Standard Liège	(Greece) Olympiacos	Loan Return	
January 28, 2016	(Belgium) Jore Trompet	(Belgium) Westerlo	(Belgium) Eendracht Aalst	Loan	
January 29, 2016	(Tanzania) Mbwana Ally Samatta	(Democratic Republic of the Congo) TP Mazembe	(Belgium) Genk	Undisclosed	
January 29, 2016	(Brazil) Wesley	(Slovakia) Trenčín	(Belgium) Club Brugge	Undisclosed	
January 30, 2016	(Belgium) Mehdi Lazaar	(Belgium) Sint-Truiden	(Belgium) Virton	Undisclosed	
January 30, 2016	(Belgium) Jens Naessens	(Belgium) Mechelen	(Belgium) Antwerp	Loan	

=== February 2016 ===
Date	Name	Moving from	Moving to	Fee	Note
February 1, 2016	(Spain) Alfonso Artabe	(Belgium) Sint-Truiden	Free Agent	Released	
February 1, 2016	(Senegal) Stéphane Badji	(Turkey) İstanbul Başakşehir	(Belgium) Anderlecht	Undisclosed	
February 1, 2016	(Switzerland) Nassim Ben Khalifa	(Turkey) Eskişehirspor	(Belgium) Mechelen	Loan	
February 1, 2016	(Morocco) Mbark Boussoufa	(Russia) Lokomotiv Moscow	(Belgium) Gent	Loan	
February 1, 2016	(Croatia) Fran Brodić	(Belgium) Antwerp	(Belgium) Club Brugge	Loan Return	
February 1, 2016	(Netherlands) Alexander Büttner	(Russia) Dynamo Moscow	(Belgium) Anderlecht	Loan	
February 1, 2016	(France) Jean-Charles Castelletto	(Belgium) Club Brugge	(Belgium) Mouscron-Péruwelz	Loan	
February 1, 2016	(Croatia) Ljuban Crepulja	(Croatia) Slaven Belupo	(Belgium) Mechelen	Undisclosed	
February 1, 2016	(Belgium) Julien De Sart	(Belgium) Standard Liège	(England) Middlesbrough	Undisclosed	
February 1, 2016	(Belgium) Charni Ekangamene	(Belgium) Zulte Waregem	(Belgium) OH Leuven	Loan	
February 1, 2016	(Belgium) Bruno Godeau	(Belgium) Zulte Waregem	(Belgium) Oostende	Undisclosed	
February 1, 2016	(Greece) Giannis Maniatis	(Greece) Olympiacos	(Belgium) Standard Liège	Loan	
February 1, 2016	(France) Souahilo Meïté	(France) Lille	(Belgium) Zulte Waregem	Loan	
February 1, 2016	(Denmark) Nicklas Pedersen	(Belgium) Gent	(Belgium) Oostende	Undisclosed	
February 1, 2016	(Germany) Nick Proschwitz	(Germany) SC Paderborn 07	(Belgium) Sint-Truiden	Undisclosed	
February 1, 2016	(Algeria) Mehdi Terki	(Belgium) Dender EH	(Belgium) Lokeren	Undisclosed	
February 1, 2016	(Spain) Fede Vico	(Belgium) Anderlecht	(Spain) Albacete	Loan	
February 1, 2016	(Serbia) Uroš Vitas	(Belgium) Gent	(Belgium) Mechelen	Undisclosed	
February 1, 2016	(Denmark) Kenneth Zohore	(Denmark) OB	(Belgium) Kortrijk	Undisclosed	
February 1, 2016	(Denmark) Kenneth Zohore	(Belgium) Kortrijk	(Wales) Cardiff City	Loan	

== Sorted by team ==
=== Anderlecht ===
In:

No.	Pos.	Nation	Player
—	MF	SEN	Stéphane Badji (from (Turkey) İstanbul Başakşehir)
—	DF	NED	Alexander Büttner (on loan from (Russia) Dynamo Moscow)
—	MF	SRB	Filip Đuričić (on loan from (Portugal) Benfica)
—	DF	BRA	Rafael Galhardo (from (Brazil) Santos)

Out:

No.	Pos.	Nation	Player
30	MF	BEL	Guillaume Gillet (to (France) Nantes)
38	MF	BEL	Andy Kawaya (on loan to (Netherlands) Willem II)
44	DF	BEL	Hervé Matthys (on loan to (Belgium) Westerlo)
—	MF	ESP	Fede Vico (on loan to (Spain) Albacete)

=== Charleroi ===
In:

No.	Pos.	Nation	Player
—	FW	PER	Cristian Benavente (from (England) Milton Keynes Dons)
—	MF	GRE	Sotiris Ninis (from (Greece) Panathinaikos)

Out:

No.	Pos.	Nation	Player
—	MF	FRA	Adrian Adam (was on loan to (Belgium) Patro Eisden Maasmechelen, now loaned to (Belgium) Seraing United)

=== Club Brugge ===
In:

No.	Pos.	Nation	Player
1	GK	FRA	Ludovic Butelle (from (France) Angers)
5	DF	FRA	Benoît Poulain (from (Belgium) Kortrijk)
7	FW	BRA	Wesley (from (Slovakia) Trenčín)
14	FW	CRO	Fran Brodić (loan return from (Belgium) Antwerp)

Out:

No.	Pos.	Nation	Player
4	DF	CRC	Óscar Duarte (to (Spain) Espanyol)
5	DF	FRA	Jean-Charles Castelletto (on loan to (Belgium) Mouscron-Péruwelz)
7	MF	ESP	Víctor Vázquez (to (Mexico) Cruz Azul)
46	FW	BEL	Dylan Seys (on loan to (Israel) Hapoel Acre)
—	FW	CHI	Nicolás Castillo (was on loan to (Italy) Frosinone, now loaned to (Chile) CD Universidad Católica)
—	FW	LAT	Valērijs Šabala (was on loan to (Poland) Miedź Legnica, now loaned to (Czech Republic) Příbram)

=== Genk ===
In:

No.	Pos.	Nation	Player
2	DF	FIN	Jere Uronen (from (Sweden) Helsingborg)
7	FW	GRE	Nikos Karelis (from (Greece) Panathinaikos)
18	MF	UKR	Ruslan Malinovskyi (on loan from (Ukraine) Shakhtar Donetsk)
77	FW	TAN	Mbwana Ally Samatta (from (Democratic Republic of the Congo) TP Mazembe)

Out:

No.	Pos.	Nation	Player
7	MF	GEO	Tornike Okriashvili (on loan to (Turkey) Eskişehirspor)
18	FW	BEL	Siebe Schrijvers (on loan to (Belgium) Waasland-Beveren)
39	MF	BEL	Pieter Gerkens (to (Belgium) Sint-Truiden)
40	DF	BEL	Alessandro Ciranni (on loan to (Netherlands) MVV)
—	DF	BEL	Jarne Vrijsen (on loan to (Netherlands) MVV)

=== Gent ===
In:

No.	Pos.	Nation	Player
11	FW	SEN	Simon Diedhiou (from (Norway) Haugesund)
18	MF	FRA	Lucas Déaux (from (France) Nantes)
22	MF	NOR	Gustav Wikheim (from (Norway) Strømsgodset)
99	FW	NGR	Peter Olayinka (from (Albania) Skënderbeu Korçë)
—	MF	MAR	Mbark Boussoufa (on loan from (Russia) Lokomotiv Moscow)
—	MF	BEL	Rob Schoofs (from (Belgium) Sint-Truiden)

Out:

No.	Pos.	Nation	Player
3	DF	SRB	Uroš Vitas (to (Belgium) Mechelen)
5	DF	SWE	Erik Johansson (to (Denmark) Copenhagen)
8	MF	SRB	Marko Poletanović (on loan to (Belgium) Zulte Waregem)
18	MF	BIH	Haris Hajradinović (on loan to (Norway) Haugesund)
26	FW	BEL	Benito Raman (on loan to (Belgium) Sint-Truiden)
28	FW	DEN	Nicklas Pedersen (to (Belgium) Oostende)
70	MF	CIV	Yaya Soumahoro (to (Belgium) Sint-Truiden)
—	FW	CMR	Serge Tabekou (on loan to (France) Sedan)

=== Kortrijk ===
In:

No.	Pos.	Nation	Player
—	MF	FRA	Xavier Mercier (from (France) Boulogne)
—	MF	NGR	Michael Olaitan (on loan from (Greece) Olympiacos)

Out:

No.	Pos.	Nation	Player
6	DF	FRA	Benoît Poulain (to (Belgium) Club Brugge)
23	MF	BEL	Baptiste Ulens (on loan to (Belgium) Tubize)
27	FW	FRA	Aboubakar Kamara (to (France) Amiens)
—	FW	DEN	Kenneth Zohore (signed from (Denmark) OB, but immediately loaned to (Wales) Cardiff City)

=== Lokeren ===
In:

No.	Pos.	Nation	Player
—	DF	BRA	João Carlos (from (Brazil) Vasco da Gama)
—	MF	ALG	Mehdi Terki (from (Belgium) Dender EH)

Out:

No.	Pos.	Nation	Player

=== Mechelen ===
In:

No.	Pos.	Nation	Player
—	MF	SUI	Nassim Ben Khalifa (on loan from (Turkey) Eskişehirspor)
—	DF	SRB	Aleksandar Bjelica (from (Netherlands) Helmond Sport)
—	DF	TPE	Xavier Chen (from (China) Guizhou Renhe)
—	DF	CRO	Ljuban Crepulja (from (Croatia) Slaven Belupo)
—	DF	MAR	Ahmed El Messaoudi (on loan from (Belgium) Lierse)
—	DF	SRB	Uroš Vitas (from (Belgium) Gent)

Out:

No.	Pos.	Nation	Player
17	FW	BEL	Jens Naessens (on loan to (Belgium) Antwerp)
21	MF	BEL	Miguel Mees (on loan to (Belgium) Heist)
22	MF	COD	Lionel Nshole (on loan to (Belgium) Heist)
33	DF	SRB	Miloš Kosanović (to (Belgium) Standard Liège)
—	DF	BEL	Jules van Cleemput (on loan to (Belgium) Heist)

=== Mouscron-Péruwelz ===
In:

No.	Pos.	Nation	Player
16	FW	ARG	Valentín Viola (on loan from (Cyprus) Apollon Limassol)
34	MF	FRA	Kevin Tapoko (from (Belgium) OH Leuven)
45	FW	SRB	Fejsal Mulić (from (Germany) 1860 München)
—	DF	FRA	Jean-Charles Castelletto (on loan from (Belgium) Club Brugge)
—	FW	SEN	Elimane Coulibaly (on loan from (Belgium) Oostende)

Out:

No.	Pos.	Nation	Player
4	DF	USA	Shane O'Neill (loan return to (Cyprus) Apollon Limassol)
45	FW	MNE	Balša Peličić (released)

=== Oostende ===
In:

No.	Pos.	Nation	Player
—	MF	BEL	Yassine El Ghanassy (from (Norway) Stabæk)
—	DF	BEL	Bruno Godeau (from (Belgium) Zulte Waregem)
—	FW	DEN	Nicklas Pedersen (from (Belgium) Gent)

Out:

No.	Pos.	Nation	Player
2	DF	FRA	Xavier Luissint (to (Belgium) Cercle Brugge)
6	DF	FRA	Baptiste Schmisser (to (Belgium) Antwerp)
13	DF	FRA	Frédéric Brillant (to (United States) New York City)
16	FW	SEN	Elimane Coulibaly (on loan to (Belgium) Mouscron-Péruwelz)
24	FW	BEL	Mathieu Cornet (to (Belgium) Antwerp)
31	FW	BEL	Bjorn Ruytinx (to (Belgium) Beerschot Wilrijk)

=== Oud-Heverlee Leuven ===
In:

No.	Pos.	Nation	Player
6	DF	FRA	Jean Calvé (free agent)
25	DF	BRA	Kanu (from (Portugal) Vitória Guimarães)
43	MF	BEL	Charni Ekangamene (on loan from (Belgium) Zulte Waregem)

Out:

No.	Pos.	Nation	Player
3	DF	BEL	David Vandenbroeck (to (Luxembourg) Differdange)
24	MF	FRA	Kevin Tapoko (to (Belgium) Mouscron-Péruwelz)

=== Sint-Truiden ===
In:

No.	Pos.	Nation	Player
5	MF	BEL	Alexis De Sart (from (Belgium) Standard Liège)
12	MF	CIV	Yaya Soumahoro (from (Belgium) Gent)
17	FW	CMR	Fabien Tchenkoua (from (France) Nîmes)
20	DF	FRA	Damien Dussaut (from (Belgium) Standard Liège)
22	MF	BRA	Allan (on loan from (England) Liverpool)
—	MF	BEL	Pieter Gerkens (from (Belgium) Genk)
—	FW	GER	Nick Proschwitz (from (Germany) SC Paderborn 07)
—	FW	BEL	Benito Raman (on loan from (Belgium) Gent)

Out:

No.	Pos.	Nation	Player
4	DF	FRA	Pierre-Baptiste Baherlé (released)
5	DF	ESP	Alfonso Artabe (released)
7	FW	BEL	Mehdi Lazaar (to (Belgium) Virton)
10	MF	FRA	Jean-Luc Dompé (to (Belgium) Standard Liège)
16	MF	BEL	Rob Schoofs (to (Belgium) Gent)
20	FW	CAF	Hilaire Momi (on loan to (Belgium) Seraing United)
22	MF	BEL	Edmilson (to (Belgium) Standard Liège)
31	MF	MLI	Falaye Sacko (loan return to (Hungary) Újpest)

=== Standard Liège ===
In:

No.	Pos.	Nation	Player
8	MF	BRA	Gabriel Boschilia (on loan from (France) Monaco)
10	MF	FRA	Jean-Luc Dompé (from (Belgium) Sint-Truiden)
17	MF	TOG	Mathieu Dossevi (was on loan from (Greece) Olympiacos, now bought)
22	MF	BEL	Edmilson (from (Belgium) Sint-Truiden)
32	DF	CMR	Collins Fai (from (Romania) Dinamo Bucharest)
33	DF	SRB	Miloš Kosanović (from (Belgium) Mechelen)
—	DF	GRE	Giannis Maniatis (on loan from (Greece) Olympiacos)
—	MF	UGA	Farouk Miya (on loan from (Uganda) Vipers)
—	GK	ESP	Víctor Valdés (on loan from (England) Manchester United)

Out:

No.	Pos.	Nation	Player
3	DF	MAR	Ahmed El Messaoudi (loan return to (Belgium) Lierse)
5	DF	POR	Jorge Teixeira (to (England) Charlton Athletic)
6	DF	SLO	Martin Milec (on loan to (Netherlands) Roda JC)
7	MF	FRA	Anthony Knockaert (to (England) Brighton & Hove Albion)
8	MF	BEL	Faysel Kasmi (loan return to (Belgium) Lierse)
10	FW	GUI	Mohamed Yattara (on loan to (France) Angers)
15	MF	BEL	Julien De Sart (to (England) Middlesbrough)
19	DF	FRA	Damien Dussaut (to (Belgium) Sint-Truiden)
37	DF	BEL	Jelle Van Damme (to (United States) LA Galaxy)
54	MF	BEL	Alexis De Sart (to (Belgium) Sint-Truiden)
60	MF	MLI	Sambou Yatabaré (loan return to (Greece) Olympiacos)
—	MF	KAZ	Georgy Zhukov (was on loan to (Kazakhstan) Astana, now loaned to (Netherlands) Roda JC)

=== Waasland-Beveren ===
In:

No.	Pos.	Nation	Player
—	MF	MLI	Ousseynou Cissé (on loan from (Spain) Rayo Vallecano)
—	FW	BEL	Siebe Schrijvers (on loan from (Belgium) Genk)

Out:

No.	Pos.	Nation	Player

=== Westerlo ===
In:

No.	Pos.	Nation	Player
—	MF	BEL	Robin Henkens (free agent)
—	DF	CIV	Igor Lolo (from (Russia) Rostov)
—	DF	BEL	Hervé Matthys (on loan from (Belgium) Anderlecht)
—	MF	BEL	Julien Vercauteren (on loan from (France) Nice)

Out:

No.	Pos.	Nation	Player
4	MF	BEL	Jore Trompet (on loan to (Belgium) Eendracht Aalst)
5	DF	SRB	Nikola Petković (released)

=== Zulte Waregem ===
In:

No.	Pos.	Nation	Player
—	DF	DEN	Henrik Dalsgaard (from (Denmark) AaB)
—	MF	FRA	Souahilo Meïté (on loan from (France) Lille)
—	MF	SRB	Marko Poletanović (on loan from (Belgium) Gent)

Out:

No.	Pos.	Nation	Player
8	MF	DEN	Jesper Jørgensen (to (Denmark) Esbjerg)
21	DF	BEL	Bruno Godeau (to (Belgium) Oostende)
43	MF	BEL	Charni Ekangamene (on loan to (Belgium) OH Leuven)
