= Layton Ndukwu =

English footballer (born 1998)

Personal information
- Full name: Layton Julius Ndukwu
- Date of birth: 7 September 1998 (age 28)
- Place of birth: Leicester, England
- Height: 1.78 m (5 ft 10 in)
- Position: Winger

Team information
- Current team: A’ali Club

Youth career
- –2017: Leicester City

Senior career*
Years	Team	Apps	(Gls)
2017–2021	Leicester City	0	(0)
2019–2020	→ Southend United (loan)	7	(0)
2022	Kukësi	5	(0)
2023	Barwell	12	(5)
2023–2024	AB	13	(2)
2024	Coalville Town	8	(1)
2024–2024	Spalding United	8	(0)
2024–present	A’ali	45	(4)

International career
2013	England U16	1	(0)
2015	England U17	5	(0)
- * Club domestic league appearances and goals as of 19:14, 4 October 2024 (UTC)

Layton Julius Ndukwu (born 7 September 1998) is an English professional footballer who plays as a winger for A’ali.

== Early life ==
Ndukwu was educated at City of Leicester College.

== Club career ==
Ndukwu is a product of the Leicester City academy. He joined Southend United on a season-long loan in August 2019, making his league debut on 10 August 2019. In January 2020, Ndukwu was recalled from his loan after a lack of playing time.

In June 2021, it was announced that Ndukwu would be released from Leicester City upon expiry of his contract at the end of the season.

In August 2022, Ndukwu returned to football to joining Albanian Kategoria Superiore side Kukësi.

In March 2023, Ndukwu returned to England to join Southern Football League Premier Division Central club Barwell. On 16 May 2023 Danish 2nd Division club Akademisk Boldklub confirmed, that Ndukwu had joined the club on a 'multi-year contract'. On 2 February 2024, the club confirmed Ndukwu's departure. Ndukwu signed for Coalville Town in March 2024.

On 30 August 2024, Ndukwu joined Spalding United.

In September 2024, Ndukwu returned to professional football joining A’ali Club in Bahrain

== International career ==
Ndukwu has represented England at under-16 and under-17 level. He is also eligible to represent Nigeria at international level.

== Career statistics ==
As of 14 March 2023

Appearances and goals by club, season and competition
Club	Season	League			National Cup (Note: Includes FA Cup and Albanian Cup)		EFL Cup		Other		Total	
Club	Season	Division	Apps	Goals	Apps	Goals	Apps	Goals	Apps	Goals	Apps	Goals
Leicester City	2016–17	Premier League	0	0	0	0	0	0	3	0	3	0
Leicester City	2017–18	Premier League	0	0	0	0	0	0	4	2	4	2
Leicester City	2018–19	Premier League	0	0	0	0	0	0	0	0	0	0
Leicester City	2019–20	Premier League	0	0	0	0	0	0	0	0	0	0
Leicester City	Total		0	0	0	0	0	0	7	2	7	2
Southend United (loan)	2019–20	League One	7	0	0	0	1	0	2	0	10	0
Kukësi	2022–23	Kategoria Superiore	5	0	1	0	—		0	0	6	0
Career total			12	0	1	0	1	0	9	2	23	2
