= Wilfred Ndidi =

Nigerian footballer (born 1996)

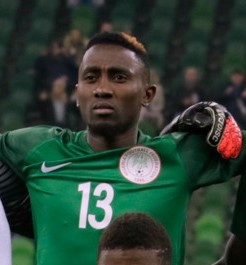
- Ndidi lining up with Nigeria in 2017

Personal information
- Full name: Onyinye Wilfred Ndidi
- Date of birth: 16 December 1996 (age 29)
- Place of birth: Lagos, Nigeria
- Height: 1.83 m (6 ft 0 in)
- Position: Defensive midfielder

Team information
- Current team: Beşiktaş
- Number: 4

Youth career
- 2002–2012: Ekosodin Stars FC
- 2012–2015: Nath Boys Academy

Senior career*
Years	Team	Apps	(Gls)
2015–2017	Genk	61	(4)
2017–2025	Leicester City	252	(11)
2025–	Beşiktaş	36	(2)

International career^{‡}
2013–2015	Nigeria U20	7	(0)
2015–	Nigeria	83	(1)
Medal record
Africa Cup of Nations
Third place	2019 Egypt
Third place	2025 Morocco
- * Club domestic league appearances and goals as of 22:22, 22 November 2026 (UTC) ‡ National team caps and goals as of 23:27, 17 November 2026 (UTC)

Onyinye Wilfred Ndidi (born 16 December 1996) is a Nigerian professional footballer who plays as a defensive midfielder for Süper Lig club Beşiktaş and captains the Nigeria national team.

== Club career ==
=== Genk ===
On 14 January 2015 Nath Boys Academy agreed a €180,000 transfer deal with Genk. The deal was completed on 15 January 2015. Ndidi made his Belgian Pro League debut with Genk on 31 January 2015 against Charleroi in a 1–0 away defeat. He played the first 74 minutes of the game before being substituted for Jarne Vrijsen.

During the Belgian League play-off game against Club Brugge, Ndidi scored a long-range goal, which was named the goal of the season in the Belgian league. After receiving an attempted-clearance outside the penalty box, he lofted the ball smoothly over an opposing player before unleashing a ferocious volley into the top right corner. The ball was adjudged to be travelling at over 111 km/h.

=== Leicester City ===
On 3 December 2016, Genk agreed a £17 million transfer deal with Leicester City. The deal was confirmed on 5 January 2017.

Ndidi made his debut for the club on 7 January 2017 in a 2–1 win against Everton in the third round of the FA Cup. He made his first Premier League start on 14 January 2017, against Chelsea at home in a 3–0 defeat. In the English FA Cup game against Derby County on 8 February 2017, Ndidi came on in the first half of extra time and scored his first goal for Leicester through another long-range shot. In a 3–1 win over Liverpool on 27 February 2017, Ndidi won 11 of his 14 tackles, a feat bettered only by Chelsea's N'Golo Kanté, who made 14 tackles against the same club in January.

Ndidi was sent off for the first time in his career during Leicester's 3–0 home defeat to Crystal Palace on 16 December 2017.

He scored the opener of the 2019–20 season for Leicester in a draw against Chelsea on 18 August 2019.

==== 2020–21 season ====
On 13 September 2020, Ndidi started at centre-back in Leicester City's opening game of the 2020–21 Premier League campaign and kept a clean sheet in a 3–0 win away to West Bromwich Albion. Ndidi suffered an adductor injury on 20 September 2020 and was ruled out for 6–12 weeks. He returned to action on 3 December in Leicester's Europa League loss to Zorya Luhansk.

On 19 January 2021, Ndidi scored his first goal of the season in Leicester City's league fixture against Chelsea. The match ended with Leicester beating their opponents 2–0 and the club went top of the league table.

==== Later career ====
Amidst rumours of Ndidi leaving Leicester as a free agent, On 12 July 2024, he signed a new three-year contract extension with the club, running until June 2027.

=== Beşiktaş ===
On 8 August 2025, Ndidi joined Beşiktaş on a permanent three-year deal with an option for another year. On 17 October 2025, Ndidi has been appointed as the vice captain of the team.

== International career ==
Ndidi was part of the Nigerian youth setup during his time at Nathaniel Boys of Lagos. While playing the African U-17 Championship with Nigeria, he was excluded along with two other players from the competition as a precaution, following an MRI age test that suggested he was slightly above the threshold. Notwithstanding, he joined up with his teammates in the U-20 team the following year, forming the bedrock of the midfield. He was called up to the senior Nigerian national team on 8 October 2015, making his debut in the friendly game against DR Congo, and playing again a few days later in the 3–0 win against Cameroon, when he replaced John Obi Mikel in the 63rd minute. He was selected by Nigeria for their 35-man provisional squad for the 2016 Summer Olympics.

In May 2018, he was named in Nigeria's preliminary 30-man squad for the 2018 FIFA World Cup in Russia. He was included in the African Cup of Nations 2019 squad and played in Nigeria's first match against Burundi. On 25 December 2021, Ndidi was selected in Nigeria's 2021 Africa Cup of Nations 28-man squad by Nigeria's caretaker coach Austin Eguavoen. On 22 January 2022, after the Africa Cup of Nations, Cameroon 2021 group stage, Confédération Africaine de Football (CAF) shortlisted Ndidi in the group stage's best team as a substitute alongside Mohamed Salah and Sadio Mané.

On 29 December 2023, Ndidi was named in the Nigerian squad for the 2023 Africa Cup of Nations in Ivory Coast. However, he sustained an injury in early January 2024 and was replaced by Alhassan Yusuf. In December 2025, Ndidi was appointed captain of the national team ahead of the 2025 Africa Cup of Nations.

== Personal life ==
In May 2019, Ndidi married his longtime girlfriend Dinma Fortune in Abuja.

In 2019, Ndidi started studying for a degree in Business and Management at De Montfort University.

On 27 January 2026, Ndidi's father was killed in a car crash just over a week after he helped the Super Eagles to third place at the 2025 Africa Cup of Nations.

== Career statistics ==
=== Club ===
As of match played 22 October 2026

Appearances and goals by club, season and competition
Club	Season	League			National cup (Note: Includes Belgian Cup, FA Cup, Turkish Cup)		League cup (Note: Includes EFL Cup)		Europe		Other		Total	
Club	Season	Division	Apps	Goals	Apps	Goals	Apps	Goals	Apps	Goals	Apps	Goals	Apps	Goals
Genk	2014–15	Belgian Pro League	6	0	0	0	—		—		—		6	0
Genk	2015–16	Belgian Pro League	36	4	5	0	—		—		2 (Note: Appearances in Belgian Pro League Europa League play-offs)	0	43	4
Genk	2016–17	Belgian Pro League	19	0	3	1	—		12 (Note: Appearances in UEFA Europa League)	2	—		34	3
Genk	Total		61	4	8	1	—		12	2	2	0	83	7
Leicester City	2016–17	Premier League	17	2	2	1	—		4 (Note: Appearances in UEFA Champions League)	0	—		23	3
Leicester City	2017–18	Premier League	33	0	3	1	2	0	—		—		38	1
Leicester City	2018–19	Premier League	38	2	0	0	2	0	—		—		40	2
Leicester City	2019–20	Premier League	32	2	3	0	4	0	—		—		39	2
Leicester City	2020–21	Premier League	26	1	6	0	0	0	4	0	—		36	1
Leicester City	2021–22	Premier League	19	0	1	0	2	0	8 (Note: Four appearances and one goal in UEFA Europa League, four appearances and one goal in UEFA Europa Conference League)	2	1 (Note: Appearance in FA Community Shield)	0	31	2
Leicester City	2022–23	Premier League	27	0	1	0	2	0	—		—		30	0
Leicester City	2023–24	Championship	32	4	1	0	3	2	—		—		36	6
Leicester City	2024–25	Premier League	28	0	1	0	1	1	—		—		30	1
Leicester City	Total		252	11	18	2	16	2	16	2	1	0	303	18
Beşiktaş	2025–26	Süper Lig	25	2	4	0	—		2 (Note: Appearances in UEFA Conference League)	0	—		31	2
Beşiktaş	2026–27	Süper Lig	7	0	0	0	—		5	1	—		12	1
Beşiktaş	Total		32	2	4	0	—		7	1	—		43	3
Career total			345	16	30	3	16	2	35	5	3	0	429	28

=== International ===
As of match played 17 November 2026

Appearances and goals by national team and year
National team	Year	Apps	Goals
Nigeria	2015	2	0
Nigeria	2016	4	0
Nigeria	2017	7 (Note: Ndidi also appeared in one match against Togo in 2017, however Nigeria made nine substitutions during this match, and therefore it is not recognised as an official match by FIFA.)	0
Nigeria	2018	10	0
Nigeria	2019	13	0
Nigeria	2021	7	0
Nigeria	2022	5	0
Nigeria	2023	5	0
Nigeria	2024	8	0
Nigeria	2025	12	1
Nigeria	2026	10	0
Total		83	1

As of match played 27 December 2025
Scores and results list Nigeria's goal tally first, score column indicates score after each Ndidi goal.

List of international goals scored by Wilfred Ndidi
No.	Date	Venue	Cap	Opponent	Score	Result	Competition
1	27 December 2025	Fez Stadium, Fez, Morocco	73	Tunisia	2–0	3–2	2025 Africa Cup of Nations

== Honours ==
Leicester City

- FA Cup: 2020–21
- FA Community Shield: 2021
- EFL Championship: 2023–24

Nigeria

- Africa Cup of Nations third place: 2019, 2025
