= 2018–19 Leicester City F.C. season =

114th season in existence of Leicester City

Leicester City
2018–19 season
- Owner: King Power
- Chairman: Vichai Srivaddhanaprabha (until 27 October); Aiyawatt Srivaddhanaprabha
- Manager: Claude Puel (until 24 February); Mike Stowell and Adam Sadler (caretaker, 24–26 February); Brendan Rodgers (from 26 February)
- Stadium: King Power Stadium
- Premier League: 9th
- FA Cup: Third round
- EFL Cup: Quarter-finals
- Top goalscorer: League: Jamie Vardy (18); All: Jamie Vardy (18)
- Highest home attendance: 32,184 (10 Nov 2018 v Burnley, PL Round 12)
- Lowest home attendance: League: 30,558 (26 Feb 2019 v Brighton & Hove Albion, PL Round 28); All: 10,671 (28 Aug 2018 v Fleetwood Town, EFL Cup)
- Average home league attendance: 31,851
- Biggest win: 4–0 (28 Aug 2018 v Fleetwood Town, EFL Cup)
- Biggest defeat: 1–4 (23 Feb 2019 v Crystal Palace, PL Round 27)
Home colours	Away colours	Third colours

The 2018–19 Leicester City season was the club's 114th season in the English football league system and their 51st (non-consecutive) season in the top tier of English football. This was their fifth consecutive season in the Premier League. They also competed in the FA Cup and EFL Cup. The season covers the period from 1 July 2018 to 30 June 2019.

The season was marred by the death of owner Vichai Srivaddhanaprabha in a helicopter crash outside the King Power Stadium on 27 October, shortly after a 1–1 home draw against West Ham United.

== Transfers ==
=== Transfers in ===
Date	Position	Nationality	Name	From	Fee	Ref.
1 July 2018	CB	(Northern Ireland)	Jonny Evans	West Bromwich Albion	£3,500,000	
1 July 2018	CB	(Netherlands)	Justen Kranthove	(Netherlands) AFC '34	Free transfer	
1 July 2018	AM	(England)	James Maddison	Norwich City	£25,000,000	
1 July 2018	RB	(Portugal)	Ricardo Pereira	(Portugal) Porto	£22,500,000	
14 July 2018	CF	(England)	Ryan Loft	Tottenham Hotspur	Free transfer	
20 July 2018	GK	(Wales)	Danny Ward	Liverpool	£12,500,000	
23 July 2018	RB	(England)	Louis Ramsay	Norwich City	Free transfer	
3 August 2018	GK	(Sweden)	Viktor Johansson	Aston Villa	Free transfer	
5 August 2018	RW	(Algeria)	Rachid Ghezzal	(France) Monaco	Undisclosed	
9 August 2018	CB	(Croatia)	Filip Benković	(Croatia) Dinamo Zagreb	Undisclosed	
9 August 2018	CB	(Turkey)	Çağlar Söyüncü	(Germany) SC Freiburg	£19,000,000	
26 August 2018	FW	(England)	Will Russ	Chesterfield	Undisclosed	
19 December 2018	CF	(Italy)	Davide Lorenzo	Free agent	Free transfer	

=== Transfers out ===
Date	Position	Nationality	Name	To	Fee	Ref.
1 July 2018	LB	(Nigeria)	Josh Debayo	Cheltenham Town	Released	
1 July 2018	LW	(England)	Tom Fielding	Mansfield Town	Released	
1 July 2018	DM	(England)	Rubyn Gill	Solihull Moors	Released	
1 July 2018	GK	(England)	Ben Hamer	Huddersfield Town	Free transfer	
1 July 2018	CB	(Germany)	Robert Huth	Retired	Released	
1 July 2018	CM	(England)	Sammie McLeod	Maldon & Tiptree	Released	
1 July 2018	CM	(Republic of Ireland)	Dylan Watts	(Republic of Ireland) Shamrock Rovers	Released	
1 July 2018	LB	(England)	Connor Wood	Bradford City	Undisclosed	
1 July 2018	GK	(Scotland)	Cameron Yates	Wycombe Wanderers	Released	
10 July 2018	RW	(Algeria)	Riyad Mahrez	Manchester City	£60,000,000	
3 August 2018	CF	(Nigeria)	Ahmed Musa	(Saudi Arabia) Al-Nassr	Undisclosed	
8 August 2018	CM	(England)	Morgan Brown	(Scotland) Aberdeen	Free transfer	
9 August 2018	CF	(England)	Josh Gordon	Walsall	Undisclosed	
10 August 2018	CF	(Argentina)	Leonardo Ulloa	(Mexico) Pachuca	Undisclosed	
17 October 2018	CB	(Northern Ireland)	Cal Templeton	Tamworth	Free transfer	
7 January 2019	DM	(Spain)	Vicente Iborra	(Spain) Villarreal	Undisclosed	
18 January 2019	CB	(Tunisia)	Yohan Benalouane	Nottingham Forest	Undisclosed	
4 February 2019	LW	(Curaçao)	Liandro Martis	Macclesfield Town	Free transfer	

=== Loans in ===
Start date	Position	Nationality	Name	From	End date	Ref.
31 January 2019	CM	(Belgium)	Youri Tielemans	(France) Monaco	31 May 2019	

=== Loans out ===
Start date	Position	Nationality	Name	To	End date	Ref.
1 July 2018	CB	(England)	Elliott Moore	(Belgium) OHL	31 May 2019	
24 July 2018	AM	(England)	Harvey Barnes	West Bromwich Albion	11 January 2019	
26 July 2018	GK	(Denmark)	Daniel Iversen	Oldham Athletic	31 May 2019	
2 August 2018	GK	(England)	Max Bramley	AFC Telford United	31 May 2019	
3 August 2018	RW	(Wales)	George Thomas	Scunthorpe United	31 May 2019	
8 August 2018	RW	(England)	Kian Williams	Barwell	27 January 2019	
11 August 2018	CF	(Algeria)	Islam Slimani	(Turkey) Fenerbahçe	31 May 2019	
31 August 2018	CB	(Croatia)	Filip Benković	(Scotland) Celtic	31 May 2019	
31 August 2018	AM	(Poland)	Bartosz Kapustka	(Belgium) Oud-Heverlee Leuven	31 May 2019	
2 January 2019	LB	(Australia)	Callum Elder	Ipswich Town	31 May 2019	
10 January 2019	LW	(Mali)	Fousseni Diabaté	(Turkey) Sivasspor	31 May 2019	
31 January 2019	RB	(England)	Darnell Johnson	(Scotland) Hibernian	31 May 2019	
31 January 2019	CM	(Wales)	Andy King	Derby County	31 May 2019	
31 January 2019	CB	(England)	Josh Knight	Peterborough United	31 May 2019	
31 January 2019	CM	(Portugal)	Adrien Silva	(France) Monaco	31 May 2019	

== First team squad ==
- This section lists players who were in Leicester's first team squad at any point during the season
- Asterisks indicates player left mid-season
- Hash symbol indicates player retired mid-season
- Italics indicate loaned player

No.	Nationality	Name	Position	Joined	Signed from
Goalkeepers
1	(Denmark)	Kasper Schmeichel	GK	2011	(England) Leeds United
12	(Wales)	Danny Ward	GK	2018	(England) Liverpool
17	(Switzerland)	Eldin Jakupović	GK	2017	(England) Hull City
Defenders
2	(England)	Danny Simpson	RB	2014	(England) Queens Park Rangers
3	(England)	Ben Chilwell	LB / LM	2015	Youth
4	(Turkey)	Çağlar Söyüncü	CB	2018	(Germany) SC Freiburg
5	(Jamaica)	Wes Morgan	CB	2012 (winter)	(England) Nottingham Forest
6	(Northern Ireland)	Jonny Evans	CB	2018	(England) West Bromwich Albion
14	(Portugal)	Ricardo Pereira	RB	2018	(Portugal) Porto
15	(England)	Harry Maguire	CB	2017	(England) Hull City
16	(Croatia)	Filip Benković	CB	2018	(Croatia) Dinamo Zagreb
28	(Austria)	Christian Fuchs	LB / CB	2015	(Germany) Schalke 04
29	(Tunisia)	Yohan Benalouane*	CB	2015	(Italy) Atalanta
35	(Australia)	Callum Elder	LB	2013	Youth
39	(England)	Darnell Johnson	CB	2018	Youth
Midfielders
7	(England)	Demarai Gray	LW / RW / CF	2016 (winter)	(England) Birmingham City
10	(England)	James Maddison	AM	2018	(England) Norwich City
11	(England)	Marc Albrighton	RM / LM	2014	(England) Aston Villa
18	(Ghana)	Daniel Amartey	CM / CB / RB / DM	2016 (winter)	(Denmark) Copenhagen
19	(England)	Harvey Barnes	AM / CM / RM / LM	2016	Youth
21	(Spain)	Vicente Iborra*	CM	2017	(Spain) Sevilla
21	(Belgium)	Youri Tielemans	CM	2019 (winter)	(France) Monaco (loan)
22	(England)	Matty James	CM	2012	(England) Manchester United
23	(Portugal)	Adrien Silva	CM	2017	(Portugal) Sporting CP
24	(France)	Nampalys Mendy	CM	2016	(France) Nice
25	(Nigeria)	Wilfred Ndidi	DM	2017 (winter)	(Belgium) Genk
31	(Algeria)	Rachid Ghezzal	LW / RW	2018	(France) Monaco
33	(Poland)	Bartosz Kapustka	LW / RW	2016	(Poland) Cracovia
37	(Wales)	Andy King	CM	2006	Youth
38	(England)	Hamza Choudhury	CM	2015	Youth
Forwards
8	(Nigeria)	Kelechi Iheanacho	ST	2017	(England) Manchester City
9	(England)	Jamie Vardy	ST/CF	2012	(England) Fleetwood Town
20	(Japan)	Shinji Okazaki	CF / AM	2015	(Germany) Mainz 05
27	(Mali)	Fousseni Diabaté	RW / LW / ST	2018	(France) Gazélec Ajaccio
—	(Algeria)	Islam Slimani	ST	2016	(Portugal) Sporting CP
—	(Wales)	George Thomas	RW / LW / ST	2017	(England) Coventry City

== Kits ==
Home	Home alt.	Home 2019-20	Away	Third

Goalkeeper 1	Goalkeeper 2	Goalkeeper 3	Goalkeeper 2019-20

== Pre-season ==
=== Pre-season friendlies ===
Leicester City announced that they will play pre-season friendlies against Notts County, Valencia and Lille, with a further two matches against Akhisarspor and Udinese Calcio as part of a tour to Austria.

20 July 2018 Friendly	Notts County	1–4	Leicester City	Nottingham
15:00 BST	Alessandra 20'	Report	Morgan 26'; Choudhury 28'; Gray 53'; Slimani 76'	Stadium: Meadow Lane; Attendance: 7,277; Referee: Thomas Bramell

25 July 2018 Friendly	Leicester City	0–0	Akhisarspor	Villach, Austria
17:00 BST				Stadium: Stadion Villach Lind

28 July 2018 Friendly	Leicester City	1–2	Udinese	Klagenfurt, Austria
16:00 BST	Iheanacho 89'	Report	Lasagna 9'; Machís 23'	Stadium: Wörthersee Stadion

1 August 2018 Friendly	Leicester City	1–1	Valencia	Leicester
19:45 BST	Iheanacho 11'	Report	Parejo 18'	Stadium: King Power Stadium

4 August 2018 Friendly	Lille	1–2	Leicester City	Lille, France
18:00 CEST	Mothiba 4'	Report	Iheanacho 35', 59'	Stadium: Stade Pierre-Mauroy; Attendance: 22,328

== Competitions ==
=== Overview ===
Competition	First match	Last match	Starting round	Final position	Record							
Competition	First match	Last match	Starting round	Final position	Pld	W	D	L	GF	GA	GD	Win %
Premier League	10 August 2018	12 May 2019	Matchday 1	9th	38	15	7	16	51	48	+3	39.47
FA Cup	6 January 2019		Third round	Third round	1	0	0	1	1	2	−1	0.00
EFL Cup	28 August 2018	18 December 2018	Second round	Quarter-finals	4	1	3	0	5	1	+4	25.00
Total					43	16	10	17	57	51	+6	37.21

Source: Soccerway

=== Premier League ===
==== League table ====
Pos	Team	Pld	W	D	L	GF	GA	GD	Pts	Qualification or relegation
7	Wolverhampton Wanderers	38	16	9	13	47	46	+1	57	Qualification to Europa League second qualifying round (Note: Since the winners of the EFL Cup and the FA Cup, Manchester City, qualified for the Champions League, the spot given to the FA Cup winners (Europa League group stage) was passed to the sixth-placed team and the spot given to the League Cup winners (Europa League second qualifying round) was passed to the seventh-placed team.)
8	Everton	38	15	9	14	54	46	+8	54	
9	Leicester City	38	15	7	16	51	48	+3	52	
10	West Ham United	38	15	7	16	52	55	−3	52	
11	Watford	38	14	8	16	52	59	−7	50	

Source: Premier League
Rules for classification: 1) Points; 2) Goal difference; 3) Goals scored; 4) Play-offs (only if needed to decide champion, teams for relegation or teams for UEFA competitions).

==== Results summary ====
Overall								Home						Away					
Pld	W	D	L	GF	GA	GD	Pts	W	D	L	GF	GA	GD	W	D	L	GF	GA	GD
38	15	7	16	51	48	+3	52	8	3	8	24	20	+4	7	4	8	27	28	−1

Last updated: 12 May 2019.
Source: Premier League

==== Results by matchday ====
Matchday	1	2	3	4	5	6	7	8	9	10	11	12	13	14	15	16	17	18	19	20	21	22	23	24	25	26	27	28	29	30	31	32	33	34	35	36	37	38
Ground	A	H	A	H	A	H	A	H	A	H	A	H	A	H	A	H	A	A	H	H	A	H	A	A	H	A	H	H	A	H	A	H	A	H	A	H	A	H
Result	L	W	W	L	L	W	W	L	L	D	W	D	D	W	D	L	L	W	W	L	W	L	L	D	L	L	L	W	L	W	W	W	W	L	D	W	L	D
Position	13	8	7	8	9	9	8	10	11	12	10	10	10	8	9	9	12	9	7	8	7	8	9	11	11	12	12	11	11	10	10	8	7	8	10	8	9	9

Updated to match(es) played on 12 May 2019. Source: Statto.com
A = Away; H = Home; W = Win; D = Draw; L = Loss

==== Matches ====
On 14 June 2018, the Premier League fixtures for the forthcoming season were announced.

10 August 2018 1	Manchester United	2–1	Leicester City	Old Trafford
20:00 BST	Pogba 3' (pen.); Fred (yellow card) 54'; A. Pereira (yellow card) 69'; Shaw 83'	Report	Amartey (yellow card) 51'; Vardy 90+2'	Stadium: Old Trafford; Attendance: 74,439; Referee: Andre Marriner

18 August 2018 2	Leicester City	2–0	Wolverhampton Wanderers	Leicester
15:00 BST	Doherty 29' (o.g.); Maddison 45'; Vardy (red card) 66'; Evans (yellow card) 78'; Maguire (yellow card) 90+6'	Report	Gibbs-White (yellow card) 74'	Stadium: King Power Stadium; Attendance: 32,043; Referee: Mike Dean

25 August 2018 3	Southampton	1–2	Leicester City	Southampton
15:00 BST	Højbjerg (yellow card) 26' (yellow-red card) 77'; Bertrand 52', (yellow card) 64'	Report	Gray 56'; Maguire 90+2', (yellow card) 90+3'	Stadium: St Mary's Stadium; Attendance: 29,925; Referee: Jonathan Moss

1 September 2018 4	Leicester City	1–2	Liverpool	Leicester
12:30 BST	Ghezzal (yellow card) 61', (goal) 63'; Mendy (yellow card) 88'; Ndidi (yellow card) 90+5'	Report	Mané 10'; Firmino 45'; Van Dijk (yellow card) 55'; Milner (yellow card) 90+3'	Stadium: King Power Stadium; Attendance: 32,149; Referee: Paul Tierney

15 September 2018 5	Bournemouth	4–2	Leicester City	Bournemouth
15:00 BST	Fraser 19', 37'; Lerma (yellow card) 29'; King 41' (pen.); Wilson (yellow card) 71'; Gosling (yellow card) 79'; Smith 81'	Report	Maguire (yellow card) 12'; Morgan (yellow card) 45+2' (yellow-red card) 69'; Schmeichel (yellow card) 70'; Maddison 88' (pen.); Albrighton 89'	Stadium: Dean Court; Attendance: 10,543; Referee: Craig Pawson

22 September 2018 6	Leicester City	3–1	Huddersfield Town	Leicester
15:00 BST	Ndidi (yellow card) 18'; Iheanacho 19'; Ghezzal (yellow card) 43'; Maddison 66'; Vardy 75'	Report	Jørgensen 5'; Kongolo (yellow card) 47'	Stadium: King Power Stadium; Attendance: 31,676; Referee: David Coote

29 September 2018 7	Newcastle United	0–2	Leicester City	Newcastle upon Tyne
15:00 BST		Report	Vardy 30' (pen.); Maguire 73'	Stadium: St James' Park; Attendance: 51,523; Referee: Simon Hooper

6 October 2018 8	Leicester City	1–2	Everton	Leicester
15:00 BST	Amartey (yellow card) 31'; Pereira 40'; Morgan (yellow card) 43' (yellow-red card) 63'; Chilwell (yellow card) 90+4'	Report	Richarlison 7'; Davies (yellow card) 45'; Sigurðsson 77'	Stadium: King Power Stadium; Attendance: 32,007; Referee: Andre Marriner

22 October 2018 9	Arsenal	3–1	Leicester City	Holloway
20:00 BST	Holding (yellow card) 17'; Xhaka (yellow card) 35'; Özil 45'; Aubameyang 63', 66'	Report	Bellerín 31' (o.g.); Albrighton (yellow card) 64'; Pereira (yellow card) 65'	Stadium: Emirates Stadium; Attendance: 59,886; Referee: Chris Kavanagh

27 October 2018 10	Leicester City	1–1	West Ham United	Leicester
17:30 BST	Söyüncü (yellow card) 47'; Ndidi 89'	Report	Balbuena 30'; Noble (red card) 38'; Zabaleta (yellow card) 85'	Stadium: King Power Stadium; Attendance: 31,848; Referee: Michael Oliver

3 November 2018 11	Cardiff City	0–1	Leicester City	Cardiff
15:00 GMT	Arter (yellow card) 45'; Hoilett (yellow card) 81'	Report	Pereira (yellow card) 33'; Gray 55', (yellow card) 55'	Stadium: Cardiff City Stadium; Attendance: 30,877; Referee: Lee Probert

10 November 2018 12	Leicester City	0–0	Burnley	Leicester
15:00 GMT	Morgan (yellow card) 50'; Iheanacho (yellow card) 76'	Report		Stadium: King Power Stadium; Attendance: 32,184; Referee: Mike Dean

24 November 2018 13	Brighton & Hove Albion	1–1	Leicester City	Falmer
15:00 GMT	Murray 15'; Duffy (yellow card) 60'; Bruno (yellow card) 66'; Izquierdo (yellow card) 72'	Report	Maddison (yellow card) 26' (yellow-red card) 28'; Ndidi (yellow card) 39'; Vardy 79' (pen.)	Stadium: Falmer Stadium; Attendance: 30,553; Referee: Chris Kavanagh

1 December 2018 14	Leicester City	2–0	Watford	Leicester
15:00 GMT	Vardy 12' (pen.); Maddison 23', (yellow card) 90+4'; Albrighton (yellow card) 62'	Report	Success (yellow card) 85'; Capoue (red card) 90'	Stadium: King Power Stadium; Attendance: 31,353; Referee: Graham Scott

5 December 2018 15	Fulham	1–1	Leicester City	Fulham
19:45 GMT	Kamara 42'	Report	Maddison 74'	Stadium: Craven Cottage; Attendance: 22,881; Referee: David Coote

8 December 2018 16	Leicester City	0–2	Tottenham Hotspur	Leicester
19:45 GMT	Mendy (yellow card) 16'; Albrighton (yellow card) 64'; Gray (yellow card) 81'	Report	Dier (yellow card) 9'; Son 45+1'; Alli 58'	Stadium: King Power Stadium; Attendance: 31,957; Referee: Craig Pawson

15 December 2018 17	Crystal Palace	1–0	Leicester City	Selhurst
15:00 GMT	Milivojević 39'; McArthur (yellow card) 45+1'; Guaita (yellow card) 90'	Report	Pereira (yellow card) 61'	Stadium: Selhurst Park; Attendance: 24,738; Referee: Michael Oliver

22 December 2018 18	Chelsea	0–1	Leicester City	Fulham
15:00 GMT		Report	Ndidi (yellow card) 31'; Vardy 51'; Mendy (yellow card) 81'	Stadium: Stamford Bridge; Attendance: 40,558; Referee: Lee Probert

26 December 2018 19	Leicester City	2–1	Manchester City	Leicester
15:00 GMT	Albrighton 19'; Maguire (yellow card) 58'; Pereira 81'; Vardy (yellow card) 87'	Report	B. Silva 14'; Stones (yellow card) 77'; Delph (red card) 89'; Agüero (yellow card) 90'	Stadium: King Power Stadium; Attendance: 32,090; Referee: Mike Dean

29 December 2018 20	Leicester City	0–1	Cardiff City	Leicester
15:00 GMT		Report	Etheridge (yellow card) 53'; Camarasa 90+2'; Morrison (yellow card) 90+4'	Stadium: King Power Stadium; Attendance: 32,047; Referee: Simon Hooper

1 January 2019 21	Everton	0–1	Leicester City	Liverpool
12:30 GMT	Gomes (yellow card) 52'; Digne (yellow card) 80'; Tosun (yellow card) 81'	Report	Vardy 58'; Evans (yellow card) 75'	Stadium: Goodison Park; Attendance: 39,052; Referee: Martin Atkinson

12 January 2019 22	Leicester City	1–2	Southampton	Leicester
15:00 GMT	Maddison (yellow card) 20'; Chilwell (yellow card) 35'; Ndidi 58'	Report	Ward-Prowse 11' (pen.); Valery (yellow card) 34' (yellow-red card) 45'; Long 45+2'; Stephens (yellow card) 54'	Stadium: King Power Stadium; Attendance: 31,491; Referee: Michael Oliver

19 January 2019 23	Wolverhampton Wanderers	4–3	Leicester City	Wolverhampton
12:30 GMT	Jota 4', 64', 90+3', (yellow card) 45+2'; Bennett 12', (yellow card) 44'; Jonny (yellow card) 86'	Report	Mendy (yellow card) 2'; Pereira (yellow card) 45+1'; Gray 47'; Coady 51' (o.g.); Ndidi (yellow card) 58'; Morgan 87'	Stadium: Molineux Stadium; Attendance: 31,278; Referee: Chris Kavanagh

30 January 2019 24	Liverpool	1–1	Leicester City	Liverpool
20:00 GMT	Mané 3'; Matip (yellow card) 16'	Report	Maguire (yellow card) 41', (goal) 45+2'; Pereira (yellow card) 50'; Chilwell (yellow card) 90+4'	Stadium: Anfield; Attendance: 53,092; Referee: Martin Atkinson

3 February 2019 25	Leicester City	0–1	Manchester United	Leicester
14:05 GMT	Vardy (yellow card) 32'; Mendy (yellow card) 45'; Ghezzal (yellow card) 82'; Ndidi (yellow card) 90+3'	Report	Rashford 9'; Lingard (yellow card) 20'; Matić (yellow card) 42'; Shaw (yellow card) 80'; Martial (yellow card) 90+3'	Stadium: King Power Stadium; Attendance: 32,148; Referee: Mike Dean

10 February 2019 26	Tottenham Hotspur	3–1	Leicester City	Wembley
13:30 GMT	Son (yellow card) 16', (goal) 90+1'; Rose (yellow card) 20'; Vertonghen (yellow card) 28'; Sánchez 33'; Eriksen 63'	Report	Vardy 76'; Tielemans (yellow card) 85'	Stadium: Wembley Stadium; Attendance: 44,154; Referee: Michael Oliver

23 February 2019 27	Leicester City	1–4	Crystal Palace	Leicester
17:30 GMT	Ndidi (yellow card) 36'; Evans 64'; Schmeichel (yellow card) 81'	Report	Batshuayi 40'; McArthur (yellow card) 51'; Zaha 70', 90+3'; Milivojević 81' (pen.)	Stadium: King Power Stadium; Attendance: 31,778; Referee: Anthony Taylor

26 February 2019 28	Leicester City	2–1	Brighton & Hove Albion	Leicester
19:45 GMT	Gray 10'; Vardy 64', (yellow card) 84'	Report	Montoya (yellow card) 23'; Pröpper 66'	Stadium: King Power Stadium; Attendance: 30,558; Referee: Lee Probert

3 March 2019 29	Watford	2–1	Leicester City	Watford
12:00 GMT	Deeney 5', (yellow card) 62'; Mariappa (yellow card) 13'; Capoue (yellow card) 60'; Doucouré (yellow card) 61'; Gray 90+2', (yellow card) 90+3'	Report	Vardy 75'; Pereira (yellow card) 84'	Stadium: Vicarage Road; Attendance: 20,062; Referee: Jonathan Moss

9 March 2019 30	Leicester City	3–1	Fulham	Leicester
15:00 GMT	Tielemans 21'; Vardy 78', 86'	Report	Ayité 51'; Babel (yellow card) 55'; Bryan (yellow card) 60'	Stadium: King Power Stadium; Attendance: 32,017; Referee: David Coote

16 March 2019 31	Burnley	1–2	Leicester City	Burnley
15:00 GMT	Bardsley (yellow card) 36'; McNeil 38'	Report	Maguire (red card) 4'; Maddison 33', (yellow card) 34'; Morgan 90'	Stadium: Turf Moor; Attendance: 20,719; Referee: Michael Oliver

30 March 2019 32	Leicester City	2–0	Bournemouth	Leicester
15:00 GMT	Morgan 11'; Vardy 82'	Report	Gosling (yellow card) 71'; Brooks (yellow card) 81'	Stadium: King Power Stadium; Attendance: 31,530; Referee: Lee Mason

6 April 2019 33	Huddersfield Town	1–4	Leicester City	Huddersfield
15:00 BST	Hogg (yellow card) 17'; Stanković (yellow card) 40'; Mooy 52' (pen.); Kongolo (yellow card) 84'	Report	Tielemans 24'; Vardy 48', 84' (pen.); Maddison 79'	Stadium: John Smith's Stadium; Attendance: 24,126; Referee: David Coote

12 April 2019 34	Leicester City	0–1	Newcastle United	Leicester
20:00 BST	Tielemans (yellow card) 41'; Schmeichel (yellow card) 68'	Report	Pérez 32'; Ki (yellow card) 63'; Schär (yellow card) 74'; Manquillo (yellow card) 78'	Stadium: King Power Stadium; Attendance: 32,108; Referee: Chris Kavanagh

20 April 2019 35	West Ham United	2–2	Leicester City	Stratford
15:00 BST	Antonio 37'; Snodgrass (yellow card) 49'; Rice (yellow card) 70'; Pérez 82'	Report	Vardy 67'; Barnes 90+2'	Stadium: London Stadium; Attendance: 59,960; Referee: Lee Probert

28 April 2019 36	Leicester City	3–0	Arsenal	Leicester
12:00 BST	Ndidi (yellow card) 13'; Tielemans 59'; Pereira (yellow card) 65'; Chilwell (yellow card) 70'; Vardy 86', 90+4'	Report	Maitland-Niles (yellow card) 8' (yellow-red card) 36'; Papastathopoulos (yellow card) 64'	Stadium: King Power Stadium; Attendance: 32,037; Referee: Michael Oliver

6 May 2019 37	Manchester City	1–0	Leicester City	Manchester
20:00 BST	D. Silva (yellow card) 22'; Kompany (yellow card) 44', (goal) 70'; Jesus (yellow card) 89'	Report	Maguire (yellow card) 35'; Iheanacho (yellow card) 90'	Stadium: City of Manchester Stadium; Attendance: 54,506; Referee: Mike Dean

12 May 2019 38	Leicester City	0–0	Chelsea	Leicester
15:00 BST		Report	Jorginho (yellow card) 30'	Stadium: King Power Stadium; Attendance: 32,140; Referee: Anthony Taylor

=== FA Cup ===
The third round draw was made live on BBC by Ruud Gullit and Paul Ince from Stamford Bridge on 3 December 2018.

6 January 2019 Third round	Newport County	2–1	Leicester City	Newport
16:30 GMT	Matt 10'; Amond 85' (pen.)	Report	Okazaki (yellow card) 45+1'; Ghezzal 82'	Stadium: Rodney Parade; Attendance: 6,705; Referee: Chris Kavanagh

=== EFL Cup ===
The second round draw was made from the Stadium of Light on 16 August. The third round draw was made on 30 August by David Seaman and Joleon Lescott. The fourth round draw was made live on Quest by Rachel Yankey and Rachel Riley on 29 September.

28 August 2018 Second round	Leicester City	4–0	Fleetwood Town	Leicester
19:45 BST	Fuchs 8'; Iborra 39', (yellow card) 53'; Iheanacho 46'; Ghezzal 71'	Report	McAleny (yellow card) 29'; Wallace (yellow card) 89'	Stadium: King Power Stadium; Attendance: 10,671; Referee: Lee Mason

25 September 2018 Third round	Wolverhampton Wanderers	0–0 (1–3 p)	Leicester City	Wolverhampton
19:45 BST	Jota (yellow card) 67'	Report	Evans (yellow card) 43'; Morgan (yellow card) 77'	Stadium: Molineux Stadium; Attendance: 21,562; Referee: Paul Tierney
	Penalties
	Saïss (penalty missed); Jota (penalty missed); Ashley-Seal (penalty scored); Traoré (penalty missed)		(penalty missed) Fuchs; (penalty scored) Ghezzal; (penalty missed) Choudhury; (penalty scored) Iborra; (penalty scored) Iheanacho

27 November 2018 Fourth round	Leicester City	0–0 (6–5 p)	Southampton	Leicester
19:45 GMT	Simpson (yellow card) 9'; Evans (yellow card) 90+5'	Report		Stadium: King Power Stadium; Attendance: 22,150; Referee: Roger East
	Penalties
	Fuchs (penalty scored); Albrighton (penalty scored); Söyüncü (penalty scored); Gray (penalty scored); Vardy (penalty scored); Mendy (penalty scored)		(penalty scored) Davis; (penalty scored) Højbjerg; (penalty scored) Redmond; (penalty scored) Vestergaard; (penalty scored) Cédric; (penalty missed) Gabbiadini
Note: The match, originally scheduled for 30 October 2018, was postponed due to the death of Leicester City owner Vichai Srivaddhanaprabha.

18 December 2018 Quarter-finals	Leicester City	1–1 (1–3 p)	Manchester City	Leicester
19:45 GMT	Albrighton 73'	Report	De Bruyne 14'; Foden (yellow card) 50'; Gündoğan (yellow card) 85'	Stadium: King Power Stadium; Attendance: 24,644; Referee: Lee Mason
	Penalties
	Maguire (penalty scored); Fuchs (penalty missed); Maddison (penalty missed); Söyüncü (penalty missed)		(penalty scored) Gündoğan; (penalty missed) Sterling; (penalty scored) Jesus; (penalty scored) Zinchenko

== Squad statistics ==
=== Appearances ===
- Asterisk (*) indicates player left club mid-season
- Hashtag (#) indicates player finished the season out on loan

No.	Pos	Nat	Player	Total		Premier League		FA Cup		League Cup	
No.	Pos	Nat	Player	Apps	Goals	Apps	Goals	Apps	Goals	Apps	Goals
1	GK	(Denmark)	Kasper Schmeichel	38	0	38	0	0	0	0	0
2	DF	(England)	Danny Simpson	9	0	3+3	0	1	0	2	0
3	DF	(England)	Ben Chilwell	36	0	36	0	0	0	0	0
4	DF	(Turkey)	Çağlar Söyüncü	8	0	4+2	0	0	0	2	0
5	DF	(Jamaica)	Wes Morgan	25	3	21+1	3	1	0	2	0
6	DF	(Northern Ireland)	Jonny Evans	28	1	21+3	1	1	0	3	0
7	MF	(England)	Demarai Gray	39	4	24+10	4	0+1	0	2+2	0
8	FW	(Nigeria)	Kelechi Iheanacho	35	2	9+21	1	1	0	3+1	1
9	FW	(England)	Jamie Vardy	36	18	30+4	18	0	0	1+1	0
10	MF	(England)	James Maddison	38	7	35+1	7	0+1	0	0+1	0
11	MF	(England)	Marc Albrighton	32	3	18+9	2	1	0	2+2	1
12	GK	(Wales)	Danny Ward	5	0	0	0	1	0	4	0
14	DF	(Portugal)	Ricardo Pereira	37	2	35	2	0	0	1+1	0
15	DF	(England)	Harry Maguire	32	3	31	3	0	0	1	0
16	DF	(Croatia)	Filip Benković#	1	0	0	0	0	0	0+1	0
17	GK	(Switzerland)	Eldin Jakupovic	0	0	0	0	0	0	0	0
18	MF	(Ghana)	Daniel Amartey	10	0	7+2	0	0	0	1	0
19	MF	(England)	Harvey Barnes	16	1	11+5	1	0	0	0	0
20	FW	(Japan)	Shinji Okazaki	25	0	1+20	0	1	0	2+1	0
21	MF	(Spain)	Vicente Iborra*	11	1	3+5	0	0	0	3	1
21	MF	(Belgium)	Youri Tielemans	13	3	13	3	0	0	0	0
22	MF	(England)	Matty James	1	0	0	0	1	0	0	0
23	MF	(Portugal)	Adrien Silva	5	0	1+1	0	0	0	3	0
24	MF	(France)	Nampalys Mendy	32	0	23+8	0	0	0	0+1	0
25	MF	(Nigeria)	Wilfred Ndidi	40	2	37+1	2	0	0	2	0
27	FW	(Mali)	Fousseni Diabaté#	3	0	1	0	0	0	1+1	0
28	DF	(Austria)	Christian Fuchs	8	1	2+1	0	1	0	4	1
29	DF	(Tunisia)	Yohan Benalouane*	0	0	0	0	0	0	0	0
31	MF	(Algeria)	Rachid Ghezzal	23	3	8+11	1	1	1	3	1
33	MF	(Poland)	Bartosz Kapustka#	0	0	0	0	0	0	0	0
34	DF	(England)	Josh Knight#	0	0	0	0	0	0	0	0
35	DF	(Australia)	Callum Elder#	0	0	0	0	0	0	0	0
37	MF	(Wales)	Andy King#	1	0	0	0	0+1	0	0	0
38	MF	(England)	Hamza Choudhury	12	0	7+2	0	1	0	1+1	0
39	DF	(England)	Darnell Johnson#	0	0	0	0	0	0	0	0
59	MF	(South Africa)	Thakgalo Leshabela	0	0	0	0	0	0	0	0
—	FW	(Algeria)	Islam Slimani#	0	0	0	0	0	0	0	0

=== Top scorers ===
Rnk	No	Pos	Nat	Name	Premier League	FA Cup	League Cup	Total
1	9	FW	(England)	Jamie Vardy	18	0	0	18
2	10	MF	(England)	James Maddison	7	0	0	7
3	7	MF	(England)	Demarai Gray	4	0	0	4
4	15	DF	(England)	Harry Maguire	3	0	0	3
4	5	DF	(Jamaica)	Wes Morgan	3	0	0	3
4	21	MF	(Belgium)	Youri Tielemans	3	0	0	3
4	11	MF	(England)	Marc Albrighton	2	0	1	3
4	31	MF	(Algeria)	Rachid Ghezzal	1	1	1	3
9
9	14	DF	(Portugal)	Ricardo Pereira	2	0	0	2
9	25	MF	(Nigeria)	Wilfred Ndidi	2	0	0	2
9	8	FW	(Nigeria)	Kelechi Iheanacho	1	0	1	2
12	6	DF	(Northern Ireland)	Jonny Evans	1	0	0	1
12	19	MF	(England)	Harvey Barnes	1	0	0	1
12	28	DF	(Austria)	Christian Fuchs	0	0	1	1
12	21	MF	(Spain)	Vicente Iborra	0	0	1	1
Own goals					3	0	0	3
Total					51	1	5	57

== Awards ==
=== Club awards ===
Leicester's annual award ceremony, including categories voted for by the players and supporters, was held on 7 May 2019. The following awards were made:

Player of the Year Award	(Portugal) Ricardo Pereira
Young Player of the Year Award	(England) James Maddison
Players' Player of the Year Award	(Portugal) Ricardo Pereira
Academy Player of the Year Award	(England) Oliver Bosworth
Development Squad Player of the Season	(England) Kiernan Dewsbury-Hall
Goal of the Season Award	(Austria) Christian Fuchs vs. Fleetwood Town, 28 August 2018
Performance of the Season	vs. Manchester City, 26 December 2018
Vichai Srivaddhanaprabha Outstanding Community Award	Geoff and Gill Smart

=== Divisional awards ===
Date	Nation	Winner	Award
April 2019	(England)	Jamie Vardy	Premier League Player of the Month
