= Lionel Nshole Makondi =

Belgian footballer

Personal information
- Date of birth: 25 February 1995 (age 31)
- Place of birth: Balen, Belgium
- Height: 1.79 m (5 ft 10 in)
- Position: Striker

Team information
- Current team: Zonhoven United
- Number: 11

Youth career
- 2001–2005: KESK Leopoldsburg
- 2005–2009: KV Balen
- 2009–2012: Westerlo
- 2012–2014: Mechelen

Senior career*
Years	Team	Apps	(Gls)
2014–2016	Mechelen	1	(0)
2016	→ Heist (loan)	10	(0)
2017–2018	UNA	0	(0)
2018–2020	KVK Beringen	28	(11)
2020–2021	Eendracht Termien		
2021–2023	Bregel Sport		
2023–	Zonhoven United	30	(3)

International career
2015	DR Congo U20	1	(0)
- * Club domestic league appearances and goals as of 17:53, 28 September 2024 (UTC)

Lionel Nshole Makondi (born 25 February 1995) is a footballer who plays for Belgian club Zonhoven United as a striker. Born in Belgium, he represented DR Congo at under-20 international level.

== Club career ==
Makondi made his Belgian Pro League debut for Mechelen on 9 August 2014 against Kortrijk. He replaced Sofiane Hanni as a 75th-minute substitute.
