= Mehdi Lazaar =

Belgian footballer (born 1993)

Personal information
- Date of birth: 9 March 1993 (age 33)
- Place of birth: Duffel, Belgium
- Height: 1.79 m (5 ft 10 in)
- Position: Forward

Team information
- Current team: Racing Troisvierges

Youth career
- –2009: RRFC Montegnée
- 2009–2013: Burnley

Senior career*
Years	Team	Apps	(Gls)
2013–2016	Sint-Truiden	31	(4)
2016–2020	Virton	89	(20)
2021–2022	MVV Maastricht	1	(0)
2022–2023	Houtvenne	19	(6)
2023	UR La Louvière	7	(1)
2024	Racing Troisvierges		
- * Club domestic league appearances and goals as of 11:44, 10 July 2022 (UTC)

Mehdi Lazaar (born 9 March 1993) is a Belgian professional footballer who plays as a forward.

== Career ==
On 7 September 2021, Lazaar joined Eerste Divisie club MVV Maastricht on a one-year deal after a successful trial. He made his debut for the club three days later, coming on as a half-time substitute for Mitchy Ntelo in a 7–1 defeat away against Emmen. At the end of the season his contract was not renewed, and he left the club as a free agent.

== Personal life ==
Born in Belgium, Lazaar is of Moroccan descent.
