= 2019–20 Leicester City F.C. season =

115th season in existence of Leicester City

Leicester City
2019–20 season
- Owner: King Power
- Chairman: Aiyawatt Srivaddhanaprabha
- Manager: Brendan Rodgers
- Stadium: King Power Stadium
- Premier League: 5th
- FA Cup: Quarter-finals
- EFL Cup: Semi-finals
- Top goalscorer: League: Jamie Vardy (23); All: Jamie Vardy (23)
- Biggest win: 9–0 v Southampton, Premier League, 25 October 2019
- Biggest defeat: 0–4 v Liverpool, Premier League, 26 December 2019
Home colours	Away colours	Third colours

The 2019–20 season was Leicester City's 115th in the English football league system and their 52nd (non-consecutive) season in the top tier of English football. This was their sixth consecutive season in the Premier League. They also competed in the FA Cup and EFL Cup. The season covered the period from 1 July 2019 to 26 July 2020.

== Kits ==
Home	Home alt.	Home alt. 2	Home 2020-21	Away	Third

Goalkeeper 1	Goalkeeper 2	Goalkeeper 3	Goalkeeper 2020-21

== Transfers ==
=== Transfers in ===
Date	Position	Nationality	Name	From	Fee	Team	Ref.
1 July 2019	RB	(England)	James Justin	(England) Luton Town	£6,000,000	First team	
4 July 2019	SS	(Spain)	Ayoze Pérez	(England) Newcastle United	£30,000,000	First team	
5 July 2019	RB	(England)	Vontae Daley-Campbell	(England) Arsenal	Free transfer	Under-23s	
5 July 2019	CF	(England)	George Hirst	(Belgium) OH Leuven	Undisclosed	Under-23s	
5 July 2019	RW	(Republic of Ireland)	Ali Reghba	(Republic of Ireland) Bohemians	Undisclosed	Under-23s	
8 July 2019	CM	(Belgium)	Youri Tielemans	(France) Monaco	£40,000,000	First team	
29 July 2019	RB	(Wales)	Mitchell Clark	(England) Aston Villa	Free transfer	Under-23s	
2 August 2019	GK	(United States)	Chituru Odunze	(Canada) Vancouver Whitecaps	Undisclosed	Academy	
8 August 2019	CM	(Belgium)	Dennis Praet	(Italy) Sampdoria	£18,000,000	First team	
9 August 2019	MF	(England)	Callum Hulme	(England) Bury	Undisclosed	Under-23s	
27 August 2019	CB	(Republic of Ireland)	Darragh O'Connor	(Republic of Ireland) Wexford	Undisclosed	Under-23s	

=== Loans in ===
Date from	Position	Nationality	Name	From	Date until	Team	Ref.
31 January 2020	CB	(England)	Ryan Bennett	(England) Wolverhampton Wanderers	30 June 2020	First team	

=== Loans out ===
Date from	Position	Nationality	Name	To	Date until	Team	Ref.
22 July 2019	GK	(Denmark)	Daniel Iversen	(England) Rotherham United	30 June 2020	Under-23s	
2 August 2019	CB	(England)	Josh Knight	(England) Peterborough United	30 June 2020	Under-23s	
2 August 2019	CF	(England)	Ryan Loft	(England) Carlisle United	30 June 2020	Under-23s	
7 August 2019	LW	(England)	Layton Ndukwu	(England) Southend United	8 January 2020	Under-23s	
16 August 2019	CM	(Wales)	Andy King	(Scotland) Rangers	5 January 2020	First team	
21 August 2019	CF	(Algeria)	Islam Slimani	(France) Monaco	30 June 2020	First team	
23 August 2019	CM	(Portugal)	Adrien Silva	(France) Monaco	30 June 2020	First team	
2 September 2019	CB	(England)	Sam Hughes	(England) Salford City	23 January 2020	Under-23s	
3 September 2019	RW	(Mali)	Fousseni Diabaté	(France) Amiens	30 June 2020	First team	
3 September 2019	RW	(Algeria)	Rachid Ghezzal	(Italy) Fiorentina	30 June 2020	First team	
13 January 2020	CM	(Wales)	George Thomas	(Netherlands) ADO Den Haag	30 June 2020	Under-23s	
16 January 2020	CM	(Wales)	Andy King	(England) Huddersfield Town	30 June 2020	First team	
27 January 2020	CM	(England)	Kiernan Dewsbury-Hall	(England) Blackpool	30 June 2020	Under-23s	
28 January 2020	CF	(Zimbabwe)	Admiral Muskwe	(England) Swindon Town	30 June 2020	Under-23s	
30 January 2020	RB	(Wales)	Mitch Clark	(England) Port Vale	30 June 2020	Under-23s	
31 January 2020	CB	(Croatia)	Filip Benković	(England) Bristol City	30 June 2020	First team	

=== Transfers out ===
Date	Position	Nationality	Name	To	Fee	Team	Ref.
1 July 2019	CF	(Wales)	Dylan Bollard	(United States) Indianapolis Greyhounds	Released	Academy	
1 July 2019	GK	(England)	Max Bramley	(England) Barwell	Released	Under-23s	
1 July 2019	LW	(England)	Kairo Edwards-John	(England) Stratford Town	Released	Under-23s	
1 July 2019	DF	(England)	George Heaven	(England) Stratford Town	Released	Academy	
1 July 2019	CM	(Thailand)	Leon James	(Thailand) Ratchaburi Mitr Phol	Released	Academy	
1 July 2019	CF	(Republic of Ireland)	Jozsef Keaveny	(Cyprus) AEK Larnaca	Released	Academy	
1 July 2019	LW	(Italy)	Davide Lorenzo	Free agent	Released	Under-23s	
1 July 2019	CM	(Nigeria)	Habib Makanjuola	(England) Scunthorpe United	Released	Under-23s	
1 July 2019	FW	(France)	Alassane Meite	(United Arab Emirates) Fujairah	Released	Under-23s	
1 July 2019	CF	(England)	Harrison Myring	(England) Doncaster Rovers	Released	Academy	
1 July 2019	CF	(Japan)	Shinji Okazaki	(Spain) Huesca	Released	First team	
1 July 2019	RB	(England)	Louis Ramsay	(England) Billericay Town	Released	Under-23s	
1 July 2019	CM	(Guinea)	Lamine Kaba Sherif	(England) Accrington Stanley	Released	Under-23s	
1 July 2019	RB	(England)	Danny Simpson	(England) Huddersfield Town	Released	First team	
1 August 2019	CB	(England)	Elliott Moore	(England) Oxford United	Undisclosed	Under-23s	
5 August 2019	CB	(England)	Harry Maguire	(England) Manchester United	£80,000,000	First team	
8 August 2019	LB	(Australia)	Callum Elder	(England) Hull City	Undisclosed	First team	
30 August 2019	CB	(Romania)	Alex Pașcanu	(Romania) CFR Cluj	€600,000	Under-23s	
9 January 2020	CB	(Czech Republic)	Lukáš Hušek	(Czech Republic) AC Sparta Prague	Undisclosed	Under-23s	
13 January 2020	CF	(Spain)	Raúl Uche	(Spain) Real Valladolid	Undisclosed	Under-23s	

== First team squad ==
- This section lists players who were in Leicester's first team squad at any point during the season
- Asterisks (*) indicates player left mid-season
- Double asterisk (**) indicates player left on loan mid season
- Hash symbol indicates player retired mid-season
- Italics indicate loaned player

No.	Nationality	Name	Position	Joined	Signed from
Goalkeepers
1	(Denmark)	Kasper Schmeichel	GK	2011	(England) Leeds United
12	(Wales)	Danny Ward	GK	2018	(England) Liverpool
35	(Switzerland)	Eldin Jakupović	GK	2017	(England) Hull City
Defenders
2	(England)	James Justin	RB	2019	(England) Luton Town
3	(England)	Ben Chilwell	LB / LM	2015	Youth
4	(Turkey)	Çağlar Söyüncü	CB	2018	(Germany) Freiburg
5	(Jamaica)	Wes Morgan	CB	2012 (winter)	(England) Nottingham Forest
6	(Northern Ireland)	Jonny Evans	CB	2018	(England) West Bromwich Albion
16	(Croatia)	Filip Benković**	CB	2018	(Croatia) Dinamo Zagreb
18	(Ghana)	Daniel Amartey	CB / RB / CM / DM	2016 (winter)	(Denmark) Copenhagen
21	(Portugal)	Ricardo Pereira	RB	2018	(Portugal) Porto
28	(Austria)	Christian Fuchs	LB / CB	2015	(Germany) Schalke 04
29	(England)	Ryan Bennett	CB	2020 (winter)	(England) Wolverhampton Wanderers (loan)
Midfielders
7	(England)	Demarai Gray	LW / RW / CF	2016 (winter)	(England) Birmingham City
8	(Belgium)	Youri Tielemans	CM	2019	(France) Monaco
10	(England)	James Maddison	AM	2018	(England) Norwich City
11	(England)	Marc Albrighton	RM / LM	2014	(England) Aston Villa
15	(England)	Harvey Barnes	AM / CM / RM / LM	2016	Youth
20	(England)	Hamza Choudhury	CM	2015	Youth
22	(England)	Matty James	CM	2012	(England) Manchester United
23	(Portugal)	Adrien Silva**	CM	2017	(Portugal) Sporting CP
24	(France)	Nampalys Mendy	CM	2016	(France) Nice
25	(Nigeria)	Wilfred Ndidi	DM	2017 (winter)	(Belgium) Genk
26	(Belgium)	Dennis Praet	AM	2019	(Italy) Sampdoria
31	(Algeria)	Rachid Ghezzal**	LW / RW	2018	(France) Monaco
37	(Wales)	Andy King**	CM	2006	Youth
Forwards
9	(England)	Jamie Vardy	ST/CF	2012	(England) Fleetwood Town
13	(Algeria)	Islam Slimani**	ST	2016	(Portugal) Sporting CP
14	(Nigeria)	Kelechi Iheanacho	ST	2017	(England) Manchester City
17	(Spain)	Ayoze Pérez	RW / ST	2019	(England) Newcastle United
27	(Mali)	Fousseni Diabaté**	RW / LW / ST	2018	(France) Gazélec Ajaccio

== Friendlies ==
16 July 2019 Friendly	Scunthorpe United	0–1	Leicester City	Scunthorpe
19:30 BST		Report	Pérez 35'	Stadium: Glanford Park

20 July 2019 Friendly	Cheltenham Town	1–2	Leicester City	Cheltenham
15:00 BST	Varney 15'		Vardy 68'; Albrighton 75'	Stadium: Whaddon Road

23 July 2019 Friendly	Cambridge United	0–3	Leicester City	Cambridge
19:30 BST		Report	Maguire 59'; Iheanacho 83'; Choudhury 87'	Stadium: Abbey Stadium

27 July 2019 Friendly	Rotherham United	2–2	Leicester City	Rotherham
15:00 BST	Morris 38'; Ihiekwe 81'	Report	Iheanacho 11', 69'	Stadium: New York Stadium; Attendance: 3,818

27 July 2019 Friendly	Stoke City	1–2	Leicester City	Stoke-on-Trent
15:00 BST	Powell 70'	Report	Albrighton 60'; Tielemans 84'	Stadium: Bet365 Stadium

2 August 2019 Friendly	Leicester City	2–1	Atalanta	Leicester
19:45 BST	Pérez 62'; Vardy 76'	Report	Muriel 89' (pen.)	Stadium: King Power Stadium; Attendance: 15,933; Referee: Graham Scott (England)

== Competitions ==
Win Draw Loss

=== Overview ===
Competition	First match	Last match	Starting round	Final position	Record							
Competition	First match	Last match	Starting round	Final position	Pld	W	D	L	GF	GA	GD	Win %
Premier League	11 August 2019	26 July 2020	Matchday 1	5th	38	18	8	12	67	41	+26	47.37
FA Cup	4 January 2020	28 June 2020	Third round	Quarter-finals	4	3	0	1	4	1	+3	75.00
EFL Cup	28 August 2019	28 January 2020	Second round	Semi-finals	6	2	3	1	12	7	+5	33.33
Total					48	23	11	14	83	49	+34	47.92

Source: Soccerway

=== Premier League ===
==== League table ====
Pos	Team	Pld	W	D	L	GF	GA	GD	Pts	Qualification or relegation
3	Manchester United	38	18	12	8	66	36	+30	66	Qualification for the Champions League group stage
4	Chelsea	38	20	6	12	69	54	+15	66	Qualification for the Champions League group stage
5	Leicester City	38	18	8	12	67	41	+26	62	Qualification for the Europa League group stage
6	Tottenham Hotspur	38	16	11	11	61	47	+14	59	Qualification for the Europa League second qualifying round (Note: Since the winners of the 2019–20 EFL Cup, Manchester City, qualified for the Champions League group stage by league position, the spot given to the EFL Cup winners (Europa League second qualifying round) was passed down to the sixth-placed team.)
7	Wolverhampton Wanderers	38	15	14	9	51	40	+11	59	

Source: Premier League
Rules for classification: 1) Points; 2) Goal difference; 3) Goals scored; 4) If the champions, relegated teams or qualified teams for UEFA competitions cannot be determined by rules 1 to 3, rules 4.1 to 4.3 are applied – 4.1) Points gained in head to head record between such teams; 4.2) Away goals scored in head to head record between such teams; 4.3) Play-offs

==== Results summary ====
Overall								Home						Away					
Pld	W	D	L	GF	GA	GD	Pts	W	D	L	GF	GA	GD	W	D	L	GF	GA	GD
38	18	8	12	67	41	+26	62	11	4	4	35	17	+18	7	4	8	32	24	+8

Source: Premier League

==== Results by matchday ====
Matchday	1	2	3	4	5	6	7	8	9	10	11	12	13	14	15	16	17	18	19	20	21	22	23	24	25	26	27	28	29	30	31	32	33	34	35	36	37	38
Ground	H	A	A	H	A	H	H	A	H	A	A	H	A	H	H	A	H	A	H	A	A	H	A	H	H	A	H	A	H	A	H	A	H	A	A	H	A	H
Result	D	D	W	W	L	W	W	L	W	W	W	W	W	W	W	W	D	L	L	W	W	L	L	W	D	D	L	L	W	D	D	L	W	D	L	W	L	L
Position	12	12	4	3	5	3	3	4	3	3	3	2	2	2	2	2	2	2	2	2	2	3	3	3	3	3	3	3	3	3	3	3	3	4	4	4	5	5

Source: Statto.com
A = Away; H = Home; W = Win; D = Draw; L = Loss

==== Matches ====
The Premier League fixtures were announced on 13 June 2019.

11 August 2019 1	Leicester City	0–0	Wolverhampton Wanderers	Leicester
14:00 BST		Report	Jonny (yellow card) 31'; Neves (yellow card) 60'	Stadium: King Power Stadium; Attendance: 32,015; Referee: Andre Marriner

18 August 2019 2	Chelsea	1–1	Leicester City	Fulham
16:30 BST	Mount 7'; Jorginho (yellow card) 37'	Report	Ndidi 67'	Stadium: Stamford Bridge; Attendance: 40,629; Referee: Oliver Langford
Note: Live on Sky Sports

24 August 2019 3	Sheffield United	1–2	Leicester City	Sheffield
15:00 BST	Lundstram (yellow card) 57'; McBurnie 62'	Report	Vardy 38'; Barnes 70'	Stadium: Bramall Lane; Attendance: 30,079; Referee: Andrew Madley

31 August 2019 4	Leicester City	3–1	Bournemouth	Leicester
15:00 BST	Vardy 12', 73'; Albrighton (yellow card) 40'; Tielemans 41'	Report	Wilson 15', (yellow card) 69'; Billing (yellow card) 21'; Lerma (yellow card) 32'	Stadium: King Power Stadium; Attendance: 31,613; Referee: Peter Bankes

14 September 2019 5	Manchester United	1–0	Leicester City	Manchester
15:00 BST	Rashford 8' (pen.); James (yellow card) 84'	Report	Maddison (yellow card) 75'; Chilwell (yellow card) 90+5'	Stadium: Old Trafford; Attendance: 73,689; Referee: Martin Atkinson

21 September 2019 6	Leicester City	2–1	Tottenham Hotspur	Leicester
12:30 BST	Pereira 69'; Gray (yellow card) 83'; Maddison 85'	Report	Sissoko (yellow card) 19'; Kane 29'; Wanyama (yellow card) 71'	Stadium: King Power Stadium; Attendance: 32,129; Referee: Paul Tierney
Note: Live on BT Sport

29 September 2019 7	Leicester City	5–0	Newcastle United	Leicester
16:30 BST	Pereira 16'; Vardy (yellow card) 24', (goal) 54', 64'; Dummett 57' (o.g.); Ndidi 90+1'	Report	Hayden (red card) 43'; Schär (yellow card) 88'	Stadium: King Power Stadium; Attendance: 32,168; Referee: Craig Pawson
Note: Live on Sky Sports

5 October 2019 8	Liverpool	2–1	Leicester City	Liverpool
15:00 BST	Fabinho (yellow card) 39'; Mané 40'; Milner 90+5' (pen.)	Report	Ndidi (yellow card) 30'; Söyüncü (yellow card) 53'; Evans (yellow card) 69'; Maddison 80'; Choudhury (yellow card) 90'	Stadium: Anfield; Attendance: 53,322; Referee: Chris Kavanagh

19 October 2019 9	Leicester City	2–1	Burnley	Leicester
15:00 BST	Vardy 45'; Tielemans 74'	Report	Hendrick (yellow card) 2'; Wood 26', (yellow card) 62'; Lowton (yellow card) 90+4'	Stadium: King Power Stadium; Attendance: 32,105; Referee: Jonathan Moss

25 October 2019 10	Southampton	0–9	Leicester City	Southampton
20:00 BST	Bertrand (red card) 12'	Report	Chilwell 10'; Tielemans 17'; Pérez 19', 39', 57'; Vardy 45', 58', 90+3' (pen.); Maddison 85'	Stadium: St. Mary's Stadium; Attendance: 28,762; Referee: Andre Marriner
Note: Live on Sky Sports

3 November 2019 11	Crystal Palace	0–2	Leicester City	Selhurst
14:00 GMT	Schlupp (yellow card) 54'; Tomkins (yellow card) 63'	Report	Evans (yellow card) 48'; Söyüncü 57', (yellow card) 81'; Vardy 88'	Stadium: Selhurst Park; Attendance: 25,480; Referee: Paul Tierney
Note: Live on Sky Sports

9 November 2019 12	Leicester City	2–0	Arsenal	Leicester
17:30 GMT	Evans (yellow card) 55'; Vardy 68'; Maddison 75'	Report	Bellerín (yellow card) 88'	Stadium: King Power Stadium; Attendance: 32,209; Referee: Chris Kavanagh
Note: Live on Sky Sports

23 November 2019 13	Brighton & Hove Albion	0–2	Leicester City	Falmer
15:00 GMT	Webster (yellow card) 16'; Stephens (yellow card) 48'	Report	Pérez 64'; Vardy 82' (pen.)	Stadium: Falmer Stadium; Attendance: 30,640; Referee: Mike Dean

1 December 2019 14	Leicester City	2–1	Everton	Leicester
16:30 GMT	Vardy 68'; Iheanacho 90+4'	Report	Richarlison 23'; Sigurðsson (yellow card) 45+2'	Stadium: King Power Stadium; Attendance: 32,144; Referee: Graham Scott
Note: Live on Sky Sports

4 December 2019 15	Leicester City	2–0	Watford	Leicester
19:30 GMT	Vardy (yellow card) 38', (goal) 55' (pen.); Söyüncü (yellow card) 41'; Ndidi (yellow card) 63'; Maddison 90+6'	Report	Deulofeu (yellow card) 46'; Masina (yellow card) 90+1'	Stadium: King Power Stadium; Attendance: 31,763; Referee: Craig Pawson
Note: Live on Amazon Prime

8 December 2019 16	Aston Villa	1–4	Leicester City	Birmingham
14:00 GMT	Mings (yellow card) 13'; Nakamba (yellow card) 36'; Grealish 45+2', (yellow card) 90+1'; Wesley (yellow card) 45+3'; Targett (yellow card) 50'; McGinn (yellow card) 60'	Report	Vardy 20', 75'; Iheanacho (yellow card) 38', (goal) 41'; Pereira (yellow card) 45+1'; Evans 49'	Stadium: Villa Park; Attendance: 41,908; Referee: Michael Oliver
Note: Live on Sky Sports

14 December 2019 17	Leicester City	1–1	Norwich City	Leicester
15:00 GMT	Krul 38' (o.g.)	Report	Pukki 26'; Cantwell (yellow card) 33'; Trybull (yellow card) 52'; Buendía (yellow card) 60'; Tettey (yellow card) 78'; Krul (yellow card) 90+3'	Stadium: King Power Stadium; Attendance: 32,101; Referee: Andrew Madley

21 December 2019 18	Manchester City	3–1	Leicester City	Manchester
17:30 GMT	Mahrez 30'; Gündoğan 43' (pen.), (yellow card) 71'; De Bruyne (yellow card) 59'; Gabriel Jesus 69'	Report	Vardy 22'; Söyüncü (yellow card) 35'; Ndidi (yellow card) 51'	Stadium: City of Manchester Stadium; Attendance: 54,415; Referee: Mike Dean
Note: Live on Sky Sports

26 December 2019 19	Leicester City	0–4	Liverpool	Leicester
20:00 GMT	Maddison (yellow card) 73'	Report	Firmino 31', 74'; Gomez (yellow card) 62'; Milner 71' (pen.); Alexander-Arnold 78'	Stadium: King Power Stadium; Attendance: 32,211; Referee: Michael Oliver
Note: Live on Amazon Prime

28 December 2019 20	West Ham United	1–2	Leicester City	Stratford
17:30 GMT	Fabiański (yellow card) 10'; Fornals 45'; Masuaku (yellow card) 49'; Diop (yellow card) 56'; Rice (yellow card) 77'	Report	Iheanacho 40'; Gray 56'; Choudhury (yellow card) 90'	Stadium: London Stadium; Attendance: 59,519; Referee: David Coote

1 January 2020 21	Newcastle United	0–3	Leicester City	Newcastle upon Tyne
15:00 GMT	Fernández (yellow card) 31'	Report	Pérez 36'; Maddison 39'; Tielemans (yellow card) 59'; Choudhury 87'	Stadium: St James' Park; Attendance: 52,178; Referee: Martin Atkinson
Note: Live on BT Sport

11 January 2020 22	Leicester City	1–2	Southampton	Leicester
15:00 GMT	Praet 14'	Report	Armstrong (yellow card) 16', (goal) 19'; Højbjerg (yellow card) 72'; Ings 81', (yellow card) 81'	Stadium: King Power Stadium; Attendance: 32,115; Referee: Lee Mason

19 January 2020 23	Burnley	2–1	Leicester City	Burnley
14:00 GMT	Wood 55'; Mee (yellow card) 67'; Westwood 79'	Report	Barnes 33'	Stadium: Turf Moor; Attendance: 19,788; Referee: Anthony Taylor
Note: Live on Sky Sports

22 January 2020 24	Leicester City	4–1	West Ham United	Leicester
19:30 GMT	Barnes 24'; Pereira 45+5'; Schmeichel (yellow card) 50'; Pérez 81' (pen.), 88'	Report	Noble 50' (pen.); Ogbonna (yellow card) 79'	Stadium: King Power Stadium; Attendance: 31,968; Referee: David Coote
Note: Live on BT Sport

1 February 2020 25	Leicester City	2–2	Chelsea	Leicester
12:30 GMT	Barnes 54'; Maddison (yellow card) 61'; Chilwell 64'; Evans (yellow card) 90+3'	Report	Rüdiger 46', 71'; Jorginho (yellow card) 56'; Kovačić (yellow card) 76'	Stadium: King Power Stadium; Attendance: 32,186; Referee: Lee Mason
Note: Live on BT Sport

14 February 2020 26	Wolverhampton Wanderers	0–0	Leicester City	Wolverhampton
20:00 GMT	Neves (yellow card) 45+1'; Dendoncker (yellow card) 55'	Report	Maddison (yellow card) 36'; Choudhury (yellow card) 51' (yellow-red card) 76'; Chilwell (yellow card) 88'	Stadium: Molineux; Attendance: 31,682; Referee: Mike Dean
Note: Live on BT Sport

22 February 2020 27	Leicester City	0–1	Manchester City	Leicester
17:30 GMT		Report	Gabriel Jesus 80'	Stadium: King Power Stadium; Attendance: 32,068; Referee: Paul Tierney
Note: Live on Sky Sports

28 February 2020 28	Norwich City	1–0	Leicester City	Norwich
20:00 GMT	Hanley (yellow card) 53'; Lewis 70'	Report	Praet (yellow card) 62'; Schmeichel (yellow card) 87'	Stadium: Carrow Road; Attendance: 27,010; Referee: Craig Pawson
Note: Live on Sky Sports

9 March 2020 29	Leicester City	4–0	Aston Villa	Leicester
20:00 GMT	Barnes 40', 85'; Vardy 63' (pen.), 79'; Praet (yellow card) 71'; Evans (yellow card) 76'	Report	Hourihane (yellow card) 43'	Stadium: King Power Stadium; Attendance: 32,125; Referee: Michael Oliver
Note: Live on Sky Sports

20 June 2020 30	Watford	1–1	Leicester City	Watford
12:30 BST	Dawson 90+3'	Report	Tielemans (yellow card) 40'; Chilwell 90'	Stadium: Vicarage Road; Attendance: 0 Referee: Craig Pawson
Note: The match was postponed on 13 March due to concerns over the coronavirus pandemic. It was rescheduled to 20 June.

23 June 2020 31	Leicester City	0–0	Brighton & Hove Albion	Leicester
18:00 BST	Justin (yellow card) 12'; Ndidi (yellow card) 34'	Report	Stephens (yellow card) 36'; Duffy (yellow card) 80'	Stadium: King Power Stadium; Attendance: 0 Referee: Lee Mason
Note: The match was postponed on 13 March due to concerns over the coronavirus pandemic. It was rescheduled to 23 June.

1 July 2020 32	Everton	2–1	Leicester City	Liverpool
18:00 BST	Richarlison 10'; Sigurðsson 16' (pen.); Pickford (yellow card) 74'	Report	Iheanacho 51'; Ndidi (yellow card) 54'	Stadium: Goodison Park; Attendance: 0 Referee: David Coote
Note: The match was postponed on 13 March due to concerns over the coronavirus pandemic. It was rescheduled to 1 July.

4 July 2020 33	Leicester City	3–0	Crystal Palace	Leicester
15:00 BST	Chilwell (yellow card) 45+3'; Iheanacho 49'; Albrighton (yellow card) 50'; Vardy 77', 90+4'	Report	McArthur (yellow card) 57'	Stadium: King Power Stadium; Attendance: 0 Referee: Jonathan Moss
Note: The match was postponed on 13 March due to concerns over the coronavirus pandemic. It was rescheduled to 4 July.

7 July 2020 34	Arsenal	1–1	Leicester City	Holloway
20:15 BST	Aubameyang 21'; Nketiah (red card) 75'; Mustafi (yellow card) 88'	Report	Vardy 84'	Stadium: Emirates Stadium; Attendance: 0 Referee: Chris Kavanagh
Note: The match was postponed on 3 April due to concerns over the coronavirus pandemic. It was rescheduled to 7 July.

12 July 2020 35	Bournemouth	4–1	Leicester City	Bournemouth
19:00 BST	Gosling (yellow card) 32'; Stanislas 65' (pen.), (yellow card) 86'; Solanke 67', 87'; Evans 83' (o.g.)	Report	Vardy 23'; Ndidi (yellow card) 65'; Söyüncü (red card) 67'	Stadium: Vitality Stadium; Attendance: 0 Referee: Stuart Attwell
Note: The match was postponed on 3 April due to concerns over the coronavirus pandemic. It was rescheduled to 12 July.

16 July 2020 36	Leicester City	2–0	Sheffield United	Leicester
18:00 BST	Pérez 29'; Evans (yellow card) 75'; Gray 79'	Report	Egan (yellow card) 80'; Fleck (yellow card) 90+2'	Stadium: King Power Stadium; Attendance: 0 Referee: Michael Oliver
Note: The match was postponed on 3 April due to concerns over the coronavirus pandemic. It was rescheduled to 16 July.

19 July 2020 37	Tottenham Hotspur	3–0	Leicester City	Tottenham
16:00 BST	Justin 6' (o.g.); Kane 37', 40'; Lucas (yellow card) 57'; Sánchez (yellow card) 86'	Report	Evans (yellow card) 73'	Stadium: Tottenham Hotspur Stadium; Attendance: 0 Referee: Anthony Taylor
Note: The match was postponed on 3 April due to concerns over the coronavirus pandemic. It was rescheduled to 19 July.

26 July 2020 38	Leicester City	0–2	Manchester United	Leicester
16:00 BST	Evans (yellow card) 68' (red card) 90+4'	Report	Maguire (yellow card) 9'; Lindelöf (yellow card) 63'; Fernandes 71' (pen.); Matić (yellow card) 83'; Pogba (yellow card) 90'; Williams (yellow card) 90+2'; Lingard 90+8'	Stadium: King Power Stadium; Attendance: 0 Referee: Martin Atkinson
Note: The match was postponed on 3 April due to concerns over the coronavirus pandemic. It was rescheduled to 26 July.

=== FA Cup ===
The third round draw was made live on BBC Two from Etihad Stadium, Micah Richards and Tony Adams conducted the draw. The fourth round draw was made by Alex Scott and David O'Leary on Monday, 6 January. The draw for the fifth round was made on 27 January 2020, live on The One Show.

4 January 2020 Third round	Leicester City	2–0	Wigan Athletic	Leicester
17:31 GMT	Pearce 19' (o.g.); Barnes 40'	Report	Morsy (yellow card) 90+3'	Stadium: King Power Stadium; Attendance: 30,330; Referee: Simon Hooper

25 January 2020 Fourth round	Brentford	0–1	Leicester City	Brentford
12:45 GMT		Report	Iheanacho 4'	Stadium: Griffin Park; Attendance: 12,221; Referee: Chris Kavanagh
Note: Live on BBC One

4 March 2020 Fifth round	Leicester City	1–0	Birmingham City	Leicester
19:45 GMT	Söyüncü (yellow card) 56'; Pereira 82'	Report	Jutkiewicz (yellow card) 80'	Stadium: King Power Stadium; Attendance: 27,181; Referee: Jonathan Moss

28 June 2020 Quarter-finals	Leicester City	0–1	Chelsea	Leicester
16:00 BST	Söyüncü (yellow card) 23'	Report	Barkley 63'	Stadium: King Power Stadium; Attendance: 0 Referee: Mike Dean
Note: The match was postponed due to the COVID-19 pandemic, and rescheduled to 28 June.

=== EFL Cup ===
The second round draw was made on 13 August 2019 following the conclusion of all but one first-round matches. The third round draw was confirmed on 28 August 2019, live on Sky Sports. The draw for the fourth round was made on 25 September 2019. The quarter-final draw was conducted on 31 October, live on BBC Radio 2.

28 August 2019 Second round	Newcastle United	1–1 (2–4 p)	Leicester City	Newcastle upon Tyne
19:45 BST	Ritchie (yellow card) 37'; Muto 53'; Fernández (yellow card) 79'	Report	Söyüncü (yellow card) 19'; Maddison 34'; Choudhury (yellow card) 44'; Morgan (yellow card) 45+4'	Stadium: St James' Park; Attendance: 22,727; Referee: Tim Robinson
	Penalties
	Muto (penalty scored); Shelvey (penalty missed); Schär (penalty scored); Hayden (penalty missed)		(penalty scored) Fuchs; (penalty scored) Maddison; (penalty scored) Tielemans; (penalty missed) Barnes; (penalty scored) Vardy

24 September 2019 Third round	Luton Town	0–4	Leicester City	Luton
19:45 BST		Report	Gray 34'; Justin 44'; Tielemans 79'; Iheanacho 86'	Stadium: Kenilworth Road; Attendance: 8,260; Referee: Matt Donohue

29 October 2019 Fourth round	Burton Albion	1–3	Leicester City	Burton upon Trent
19:45 GMT	Boyce 52'	Report	Iheanacho 7'; Tielemans 20'; Maddison 89'	Stadium: Pirelli Stadium; Attendance: 6,186; Referee: Darren England

18 December 2019 Quarter-final	Everton	2–2 (2–4 p)	Leicester City	Liverpool
19:45 GMT	Davies 70'; Baines 90+1'	Report	Maddison 26'; Evans 29'	Stadium: Goodison Park; Attendance: 39,027; Referee: Jonathan Moss
	Penalties
	Tosun (penalty missed); Baines (penalty missed); Holgate (penalty scored); Calvert-Lewin (penalty scored)		(penalty missed) Maddison; (penalty scored) Chilwell; (penalty scored) Pereira; (penalty scored) Gray; (penalty scored) Vardy

8 January 2020 Semi-final First leg	Leicester City	1–1	Aston Villa	Leicester
20:00 GMT	Vardy (yellow card) 38'; Iheanacho 74'	Report	Guilbert 28'; El Ghazi (yellow card) 36'; Konsa (yellow card) 74'	Stadium: King Power Stadium; Attendance: 31,280; Referee: Chris Kavanagh

28 January 2020 Semi-final Second leg	Aston Villa	2–1 (3–2 agg.)	Leicester City	Birmingham
19:45 GMT	Targett 12'; Konsa (yellow card) 57'; Douglas Luiz (yellow card) 60'; Trézéguet 90+3'	Report	Iheanacho 72'; Söyüncü (yellow card) 76'	Stadium: Villa Park; Attendance: 39,300; Referee: Mike Dean

== Squad statistics ==
=== Appearances ===
- Asterisk (*) indicates player left club during season
- Double asterisk (**) indicates player left on loan mid season
- Italics indicate a loaned player

No.	Pos	Nat	Player	Total		Premier League		FA Cup		League Cup	
No.	Pos	Nat	Player	Apps	Goals	Apps	Goals	Apps	Goals	Apps	Goals
1	GK	(Denmark)	Kasper Schmeichel	44	0	38	0	2	0	4	0
2	DF	(England)	James Justin	18	1	11+2	0	3	0	2	1
3	DF	(England)	Ben Chilwell	33	3	27	3	3	0	3	0
4	DF	(Turkey)	Çağlar Söyüncü	42	1	34	1	3+1	0	3+1	0
5	DF	(Jamaica)	Wes Morgan	17	0	4+7	0	2	0	4	0
6	DF	(Northern Ireland)	Jonny Evans	45	2	37	1	2	0	5+1	1
7	MF	(England)	Demarai Gray	28	3	3+18	2	2+1	0	2+2	1
8	MF	(Belgium)	Youri Tielemans	44	5	32+5	3	1+1	0	5	2
9	FW	(England)	Jamie Vardy	40	23	34+1	23	1	0	3+1	0
10	MF	(England)	James Maddison	39	9	30+2	6	1+1	0	4+1	3
11	MF	(England)	Marc Albrighton	28	0	9+11	0	3+1	0	3+1	0
12	GK	(Wales)	Danny Ward	4	0	0	0	2	0	2	0
13	FW	(Algeria)	Islam Slimani**	0	0	0	0	0	0	0	0
14	FW	(Nigeria)	Kelechi Iheanacho	26	10	12+8	5	2	1	2+2	4
15	MF	(England)	Harvey Barnes	42	7	24+12	6	2+1	1	2+1	0
16	DF	(Croatia)	Filip Benković**	1	0	0	0	1	0	0	0
17	FW	(Spain)	Ayoze Pérez	40	8	26+7	8	2	0	5	0
18	DF	(Ghana)	Daniel Amartey	0	0	0	0	0	0	0	0
20	MF	(England)	Hamza Choudhury	29	1	10+10	1	2+2	0	2+3	0
21	DF	(Portugal)	Ricardo Pereira	33	4	28	3	1	1	4	0
22	MF	(England)	Matty James	1	0	0+1	0	0	0	0	0
23	MF	(Portugal)	Adrien Silva**	0	0	0	0	0	0	0	0
24	MF	(France)	Nampalys Mendy	8	0	4+3	0	1	0	0	0
25	MF	(Nigeria)	Wilfred Ndidi	39	2	29+3	2	2+1	0	3+1	0
26	MF	(Belgium)	Dennis Praet	36	1	12+15	1	4	0	4+1	0
27	MF	(Mali)	Fousseni Diabaté**	0	0	0	0	0	0	0	0
28	DF	(Austria)	Christian Fuchs	17	0	8+3	0	1+1	0	4	0
29	DF	(England)	Ryan Bennett	5	0	3+2	0	0	0	0	0
31	MF	(Algeria)	Rachid Ghezzal**	0	0	0	0	0	0	0	0
35	GK	(Switzerland)	Eldin Jakupović	0	0	0	0	0	0	0	0
37	MF	(Wales)	Andy King**	0	0	0	0	0	0	0	0
39	DF	(England)	Darnell Johnson	0	0	0	0	0	0	0	0
45	FW	(England)	George Hirst	2	0	0+2	0	0	0	0	0
49	MF	(England)	Kiernan Dewsbury-Hall**	1	0	0	0	0+1	0	0	0
56	DF	(England)	Luke Thomas	3	0	3	0	0	0	0	0

=== Goalscorers ===
Rnk	No	Pos	Nat	Name	Premier League	FA Cup	League Cup	Total
1	9	FW	(England)	Jamie Vardy	23	0	0	23
2	14	FW	(Nigeria)	Kelechi Iheanacho	5	1	4	10
3	10	MF	(England)	James Maddison	6	0	3	9
4	17	FW	(Spain)	Ayoze Pérez	8	0	0	8
5	15	MF	(England)	Harvey Barnes	6	1	0	7
6	8	MF	(Belgium)	Youri Tielemans	3	0	2	5
7	21	DF	(Portugal)	Ricardo Pereira	3	1	0	4
8	3	DF	(England)	Ben Chilwell	3	0	0	3
8	7	MF	(England)	Demarai Gray	2	0	1	3
10	25	MF	(Nigeria)	Wilfred Ndidi	2	0	0	2
10	6	DF	(Northern Ireland)	Jonny Evans	1	0	1	2
12	4	DF	(Turkey)	Çağlar Söyüncü	1	0	0	1
12	20	MF	(England)	Hamza Choudhury	1	0	0	1
12	26	MF	(Belgium)	Dennis Praet	1	0	0	1
12	2	DF	(England)	James Justin	0	0	1	1
Own goals					2	1	0	3
Total					67	4	12	83

== Awards ==
=== Club awards ===
The following players received awards at Leicester's annual award ceremony.

Player of the Year Award	(England) Jamie Vardy
Young Player of the Year Award	(England) Harvey Barnes
Players' Player of the Year Award	(England) Jamie Vardy
Academy Player of the year Award	(England) Oliver Bosworth
Development Squad Player of the Season	(England) Luke Thomas
Goal of the Season Award	(England) Harvey Barnes vs. Sheffield United F.C., 31 August 2019

=== Divisional awards ===
Date	Nation	Winner	Award
August 2019	(England)	Harvey Barnes	Premier League Goal of the Month
October 2019	(England)	Jamie Vardy	Premier League Player of the Month
