= Jarne Vrijsen =

Belgian footballer

Personal information
- Full name: Jarne Vrijsen
- Date of birth: 21 March 1996 (age 30)
- Place of birth: Opglabbeek, Belgium
- Position: Left back

Team information
- Current team: Patro Eisden
- Number: 3

Youth career
- Kabouters Opglabbeek
- –2014: Genk

Senior career*
Years	Team	Apps	(Gls)
2014–2016	Genk	4	(0)
2016	→ MVV Maastricht (loan)	3	(0)
2016–2017	KSK Heist	14	(0)
2017–2019	Sporting Hasselt		
2019–	Patro Eisden	2	(0)

International career
2015	Belgium U19	3	(1)
- * Club domestic league appearances and goals as of 19:03, 29 April 2020 (UTC)

Jarne Vrijsen (born 21 March 1996) is a Belgian footballer who currently plays for Belgian club Genk. He plays as a left back.

== Career ==
Vrijsen is a youth exponent from K.R.C. Genk which he joined from Kabouters Opglabbeek as a U7 player. He made his Belgian Pro League debut at 13 December 2014 in a 3–0 home win against K.V. Kortrijk. He replaced Christian Kabasele after 83 minutes.
