= List of Leicester City F.C. seasons =

Graph of Leicester City seasons

This is a list of seasons played by Leicester City Football Club in English and European football, from 1890 (when Leicester Fosse first competed in the FA Cup) to the present day. It details the club's achievements in major competitions, and the top scorers for each season.

In 2016, Leicester City clinched their first Premier League title, their highest position in the League. Their lowest position was in 2009, when they clinched the League One (third tier) title, their first season outside the top two tiers of English football.

== Seasons ==
=== Overall ===
- Seasons spent at Level 1 of the football league system: 56
- Seasons spent at Level 2 of the football league system: 64
- Seasons spent at Level 3 of the football league system: 1
- Seasons spent at Level 4 of the football league system: 0

Season	League										FA Cup	EFL Cup (Note: The League Cup was founded in 1960.)	Other / Europe		Top goalscorer(s) (Note: Goals in all competitions (The Football League (including Football League play-offs or Premier League, FA Cup, League Cup, Football League Trophy, Anglo-Italian Cup, Charity Shield and European) are counted.)		Avg. Att (Note: League matches only.)
Season	Division	Lvl	Pld	W	D	L	GF	GA	Pts	Pos	FA Cup	EFL Cup	Competition	Res	Overall	G	Avg. Att
as Leicester Fosse F.C.
1890–91	No League appearances recorded										1Q						n/a
1891–92	ML		20	5	3	12	21	56	13	11th	1Q				(England) Jimmy Atter	6	n/a
1892–93	ML		24	12	3	9	50	37	27	4th	3Q				(England) Billy Dorrell	15	n/a
1893–94	ML		20	15	2	3	49	13	32	2nd	R2				(Scotland) Jimmy Brown	16	3,600
1894–95	Div 2	2	30	15	8	7	72	53	38	4th	R1				(Scotland) David Skea	31	4,067
1895–96	Div 2	2	30	14	4	12	57	44	32	8th	4Q				(Scotland) Willie McArthur (England) Harry Trainer	14	5,200
1896–97	Div 2	2	30	13	4	13	59	57	30	9th	5Q				(England) Billy Dorrell	13	5,434
1897–98	Div 2	2	30	13	7	10	46	35	33	7th	R1				(Scotland) Roddy McLeod	14	5,034
1898–99	Div 2	2	34	18	9	7	64	42	45	3rd	5Q				(Scotland) Tommy Galbraith	17	5,748
1899–1900	Div 2	2	34	17	9	8	53	36	43	5th	R1				(Scotland) Rab King	14	6,030
1900–01	Div 2	2	34	11	10	13	39	37	32	11th	R1				(Scotland) Tommy Brown	9	4,677
1901–02	Div 2	2	34	12	5	17	38	56	29	14th	INT				(Scotland) Tommy Brown	9	3,267
1902–03	Div 2	2	34	10	8	16	41	65	28	15th	4Q				(Scotland) Tommy Brown	14	4,471
1903–04	Div 2	2	34	6	10	18	42	82	22	18th	5Q				(England) Ike Evenson	12	4,765
1904–05	Div 2	2	34	11	7	16	40	55	29	14th	R1				(England) Arthur Mounteney	20	5,435
1905–06	Div 2	2	38	15	12	11	53	48	42	7th	R1				(England) Archie Hubbard	12	5,764
1906–07	Div 2	2	38	20	8	10	62	39	48	3rd	R1				(England) Harry Wilcox	14	10,202
1907–08	Div 2 ↑	2	38	21	10	7	72	47	52	2nd	R2				(England) Percy Humphreys	20	11,808
1908–09	Div 1 ↓	1	38	8	9	21	54	102	25	20th	R2				(England) Jimmy Donnelly	11	12,790
1909–10	Div 2	2	38	20	4	14	79	58	44	5th	QF				(England) Fred Shinton	34	10,211
1910–11	Div 2	2	38	14	5	19	52	62	33	15th	R2				(England) Davie Walker	8	8,345
1911–12	Div 2	2	38	15	7	16	49	66	37	10th	R2				(England) Fred Osborn (England) Henry Sparrow	11	8,579
1912–13	Div 2	2	38	13	7	18	50	65	33	15th	R1				(England) Fred Osborn	14	4,639
1913–14	Div 2	2	38	11	4	23	45	61	26	18th	R1				(England) Tommy Benfield	11	6,053
1914–15	Div 2	2	38	10	4	24	47	88	24	19th	6Q				(England) Billy Mills	11	2,264
The Football League and FA Cup were suspended until after World War I.
as Leicester City F.C.
1919–20	Div 2	2	42	15	10	17	41	61	40	14th	R3				(Scotland) John Paterson	12	13,788
1920–21	Div 2	2	42	12	16	14	39	46	40	12th	R1				(Scotland) John Paterson	17	16,646
1921–22	Div 2	2	42	14	17	11	39	34	45	9th	R3				(Scotland) John Paterson (England) Alex Trotter	8	15,902
1922–23	Div 2	2	42	21	9	12	65	44	51	3rd	R2				(Scotland) Johnny Duncan	22	17,865
1923–24	Div 2	2	42	17	8	17	64	54	42	12th	R1				(England) Arthur Chandler	24	17,897
1924–25	Div 2 ↑	2	42	24	11	7	90	32	59	1st	QF				(England) Arthur Chandler	38	18,406
1925–26	Div 1	1	42	14	10	18	70	80	38	17th	R3				(England) Arthur Chandler	26	24,693
1926–27	Div 1	1	42	17	12	13	85	70	46	7th	R3				(England) Arthur Chandler	29	23,665
1927–28	Div 1	1	42	18	12	12	96	72	48	3rd	R5				(England) Arthur Chandler	34	24,758
1928–29	Div 1	1	42	21	9	12	96	67	52	2nd	R5				(England) Arthur Chandler	34	23,774
1929–30	Div 1	1	42	17	9	16	86	90	43	8th	R3				(England) Arthur Chandler	32	21,345
1930–31	Div 1	1	42	16	6	20	80	95	38	16th	R3				(England) Ernie Hine	31	17,335
1931–32	Div 1	1	42	15	7	20	74	94	34	19th	R5				(England) Ernie Hine	28	16,242
1932–33	Div 1	1	42	11	13	18	75	89	35	19th	R3				(England) Arthur Maw	14	16,823
1933–34	Div 1	1	42	14	11	17	59	74	39	17th	SF				(Scotland) Danny Liddle	14	18,071
1934–35	Div 1 ↓	1	42	12	9	21	61	86	33	21st	R4				(Scotland) Danny Liddle	14	17,995
1935–36	Div 2	2	42	19	10	13	79	57	48	6th	R5				(England) Arthur Maw	18	15,128
1936–37	Div 2 ↑	2	42	24	8	10	89	57	56	1st	R4				(England) Jack Bowers	35	20,353
1937–38	Div 1	1	42	14	11	17	54	75	39	16th	R4				(England) Jack Bowers (Scotland) Danny Liddle	11	20,313
1938–39	Div 1 ↓	1	42	9	11	22	48	82	29	22nd	R4				(England) George Dewis	12	16,512
The Football League and FA Cup were suspended until after World War II.
1945–46	n/a (Note: The FA Cup was contested in 1945–46 but The Football League did not resume until the following season.)										R3	n/a					
1946–47	Div 2	2	42	18	7	17	69	64	43	9th	R5				(England) George Dewis	19	24,502
1947–48	Div 2	2	42	16	11	15	60	57	43	9th	R5				(England) Jack Lee	15	26,807
1948–49	Div 2	2	42	10	16	16	62	79	36	19th	RU				(England) Jack Lee	29	30,242
1949–50	Div 2	2	42	12	15	15	55	65	39	15th	R3				(England) Jack Lee	22	29,078
1950–51	Div 2	2	42	15	11	16	68	58	41	14th	R3				(England) Arthur Rowley	28	26,892
1951–52	Div 2	2	42	19	9	14	78	64	47	5th	R3				(England) Arthur Rowley	38	25,822
1952–53	Div 2	2	42	18	12	12	89	74	48	5th	R3				(England) Arthur Rowley	41	26,247
1953–54	Div 2 ↑	2	42	23	9	9	97	60	56	1st	QR				(England) Arthur Rowley	36	28,818
1954–55	Div 1 ↓	1	42	12	11	19	74	86	35	21st	R3				(England) Arthur Rowley	23	30,736
1955–56	Div 2	2	42	21	6	15	94	78	48	5th	R4				(Scotland) Willie Gardiner (England) Arthur Rowley	35	27,849
1956–57	Div 2 ↑	2	42	25	11	6	109	67	61	1st	R3				(England) Arthur Rowley	44	30,541
1957–58	Div 1	1	42	14	5	23	91	112	33	18th	R3				(England) Arthur Rowley	20	31,389
1958–59	Div 1	1	42	11	10	21	67	98	32	19th	R4				(England) Jimmy Walsh	20	28,051
1959–60	Div 1	1	42	13	13	16	66	75	39	12th	QF				(England) Albert Cheesebrough	17	25,533
1960–61	Div 1	1	42	18	9	15	87	70	45	6th	RU	R2			(England) Jimmy Walsh	29	24,056
1961–62	Div 1	1	42	17	6	19	72	71	40	14th	R3	R2	European Cup Winners' Cup	R1	(England) Ken Keyworth	19	19,378
1962–63	Div 1	1	42	20	12	10	79	53	52	4th	RU	R2			(England) Ken Keyworth	27	25,726
1963–64	Div 1	1	42	16	11	15	61	58	43	11th	R3	W			(England) Ken Keyworth	16	24,142
1964–65	Div 1	1	42	11	13	18	69	85	35	18th	QF	RU			(Scotland) Jimmy Goodfellow	17	20,031
1965–66	Div 1	1	42	21	7	14	80	65	49	7th	R5	R2			(Scotland) Jackie Sinclair	24	22,298
1966–67	Div 1	1	42	18	8	16	78	71	44	8th	R3	R4			(Scotland) Jackie Sinclair	22	24,440
1967–68	Div 1	1	42	13	12	17	64	69	38	13th	QF	R2			(England) Mike Stringfellow	14	24,575
1968–69	Div 1 ↓	1	42	9	12	21	39	68	30	21st	RU	R4			(England) Allan Clarke	16	28,414
1969–70	Div 2	2	42	19	13	10	64	50	51	3rd	R5	QF			(England) Rodney Fern	18	25,079
1970–71	Div 2 ↑	2	42	23	13	6	57	30	59	1st	R4	R4			(Scotland) Alistair Brown	17	25,941
1971–72	Div 1	1	42	13	13	16	41	46	39	12th	R4	R2	FA Charity Shield	W	(Scotland) Alistair Brown	7	28,576
1972–73	Div 1	1	42	10	17	15	40	46	37	16th	R3	R2			(England) Frank Worthington	11	23,042
1973–74	Div 1	1	42	13	16	13	51	41	42	9th	SF	R2			(England) Frank Worthington	24	25,168
1974–75	Div 1	1	42	12	12	18	46	60	36	18th	R5	R3			(England) Frank Worthington	19	23,765
1975–76	Div 1	1	42	13	19	10	48	51	45	7th	R5	R4			(England) Bob Lee	13	22,110
1976–77	Div 1	1	42	12	18	12	47	60	42	11th	R3	R2			(England) Frank Worthington	14	18,802
1977–78	Div 1 ↓	1	42	5	12	25	26	70	22	22nd	R4	R2			(England) Roger Davies (England) Mark Goodwin	4	17,768
1978–79	Div 2	2	42	10	17	15	43	52	37	17th	R4	R2			(England) Trevor Christie	8	14,189
1979–80	Div 2 ↑	2	42	21	13	8	58	38	55	1st	R3	R1			(Scotland) Alan Young	15	18,519
1980–81	Div 1 ↓	1	42	13	6	23	40	67	32	21st	R4	R2			(Scotland) Jim Melrose	11	19,442
1981–82 (Note: The 1981–82 season saw the introduction of three points for a win.)	Div 2	2	42	18	12	12	56	48	66	8th	SF	R3			(England) Gary Lineker	19	14,221
1982–83	Div 2 ↑	2	42	20	10	12	72	44	70	3rd	R3	R2			(England) Gary Lineker	26	12,369
1983–84	Div 1	1	42	13	12	17	65	68	51	15th	R3	R2			(England) Gary Lineker	22	14,735
1984–85	Div 1	1	42	15	6	21	65	73	51	15th	R5	R3			(England) Gary Lineker	28	14,531
1985–86	Div 1	1	42	10	12	20	54	76	42	19th	R3	R2			(England) Alan Smith	19	11,749
1986–87	Div 1 ↓	1	42	11	9	22	54	76	42	20th	R3	R3			(England) Alan Smith	22	11,698
1987–88	Div 2	2	44	16	11	17	62	61	59	13th	R3	R3	Full Members Cup	R3	(England) Mike Newell	11	10,153
1988–89	Div 2	2	46	13	16	17	56	63	55	15th	R3	R4	Full Members Cup	R1	(England) Mike Newell	15	10,694
1989–90	Div 2	2	46	15	14	17	67	79	59	13th	R3	R2	Full Members Cup	R1	(Scotland) Gary McAllister	10	11,716
1990–91	Div 2	2	46	14	8	24	60	83	50	22nd	R3	R2	Full Members Cup	R1	(Republic of Ireland) David Kelly	15	11,546
1991–92	Div 2	2	46	23	8	15	62	55	77	4th	R4	R2	Full Members Cup League play-offs	R1 RU	(England) Tommy Wright	19	15,182
1992–93 (Note: The 22 top English clubs break away from The Football League to form the FA Premier League as the new top tier of the English football pyramid.)	Div 1	2	46	22	10	14	71	64	76	6th	R3	R3	League play-offs	RU	(England) Steve Walsh	16	15,327
1993–94	Div 1 ↑	2	46	19	16	11	72	59	73	4th	R3	R3	Anglo-Italian Cup League play-offs	PR W	(Scotland) David Speedie	14	16,004
1994–95	Prem ↓	1	42	6	11	25	45	80	29	21st	R5	R2	Anglo-Italian Cup	PR	(Wales) Iwan Roberts	11	19,532
1995–96	Div 1 ↑	2	46	19	14	13	66	60	71	5th	R3	R3	League play-offs	W	(Wales) Iwan Roberts	20	16,198
1996–97	Prem	1	38	12	11	15	46	54	47	9th	R5	W			(England) Steve Claridge	14	20,184
1997–98	Prem	1	38	13	14	11	51	41	53	10th	R4	R3	UEFA Cup	R1	(England) Emile Heskey (England) Ian Marshall	10	20,615
1998–99	Prem	1	38	12	13	13	40	46	49	10th	R4	RU			(England) Tony Cottee	16	20,483
1999–2000	Prem	1	38	16	7	15	55	55	55	8th	R5	W			(England) Tony Cottee	13	19,827
2000–01	Prem	1	38	14	6	18	39	51	48	13th	QF	R3	UEFA Cup	R1	(Turkey) Muzzy Izzet	11	20,452
2001–02	Prem ↓	1	38	5	13	20	30	64	28	20th	R4	R3			(England) James Scowcroft	7	19,835
2002–03	Div 1 ↑	2	46	26	14	6	73	40	92	2nd	R4	R3			(Scotland) Paul Dickov	20	29,230
2003–04	Prem ↓	1	38	6	15	17	48	65	33	18th	R3	R3			(Scotland) Paul Dickov (England) Les Ferdinand	13	30,983
2004–05 (Note: The three divisions in the Football League are re-named: Division One becomes The Championship, Division Two becomes League One and Division Three becomes League Two.)	Champ	2	46	12	21	13	49	46	57	15th	QF	R2			(Republic of Ireland) David Connolly	13	24,137
2005–06	Champ	2	46	13	15	18	51	59	54	16th	R4	R4			(Netherlands) Mark de Vries (Iceland) Joey Guðjónsson (Canada) Iain Hume	9	22,234
2006–07	Champ	2	46	13	14	19	49	64	53	19th	R3	R3			(Canada) Iain Hume	14	23,206
2007–08	Champ ↓	2	46	12	16	18	42	45	52	22nd	R3	R4			(Canada) Iain Hume	11	23,509
2008–09	Lge 1 ↑	3	46	27	15	4	84	39	96	1st	R3	R2	League Trophy	AQF	(England) Matty Fryatt	32	20,254
2009–10	Champ	2	46	21	13	12	61	45	76	5th	R4	R2	League play-offs	SF	(England) Matty Fryatt	13	24,542
2010–11	Champ	2	46	19	10	17	76	71	67	10th	R3	R4			(Wales) Andy King	16	23,666
2011–12	Champ	2	46	18	12	16	66	55	66	9th	QF	R3			(England) David Nugent	16	23,037
2012–13	Champ	2	46	19	11	16	71	48	68	6th	R4	R2	League play-offs	SF	(England) David Nugent	16	22,283
2013–14	Champ ↑	2	46	31	9	6	83	43	102	1st	R3	QF			(England) David Nugent	22	24,990
2014–15	Prem	1	38	11	8	19	46	55	41	14th	R5	R2			(Argentina) Leonardo Ulloa	13	31,693
2015–16	Prem	1	38	23	12	3	68	36	81	1st	R3	R4			(England) Jamie Vardy	24	32,014
2016–17	Prem	1	38	12	8	18	48	63	44	12th	R5	R3	FA Community Shield UEFA Champions League	RU QF	(England) Jamie Vardy	16	31,886
2017–18	Prem	1	38	12	11	15	56	60	47	9th	QF	QF			(England) Jamie Vardy	23	31,559
2018–19	Prem	1	38	15	7	16	51	48	52	9th	R3	QF			(England) Jamie Vardy	18	31,895
2019–20	Prem	1	38	18	8	12	67	41	62	5th	QF	SF			(England) Jamie Vardy	23	32,039 (Note: The remaining four league fixtures of the 2019–20 season were played behind closed doors due to the COVID-19 pandemic in the United Kingdom.)
2020–21	Prem	1	38	20	6	12	68	50	66	5th	W	R3	UEFA Europa League	R32	(Nigeria) Kelechi Iheanacho	19	N/A (Note: All league fixtures bar one of the 2020–21 season were played behind closed doors due to the COVID-19 pandemic in the United Kingdom.)
2021–22	Prem	1	38	14	10	14	62	59	52	8th	R4	QF	FA Community Shield UEFA Europa League UEFA Europa Conference League	W GS SF	(England) James Maddison	18	31,941
2022–23	Prem ↓	1	38	9	7	22	51	68	34	18th	R5	QF			(England) Harvey Barnes	13	31,887
2023–24	Champ ↑	2	46	31	4	11	89	41	97	1st	QF	R3			(England) Jamie Vardy	20	31,198
2024–25	Prem ↓	1	38	6	7	25	33	80	25	18th	R4	R4			(England) Jamie Vardy	10	30,911
2025–26	Champ ↓	2	46	12	16	18	58	68	46 (Note: The club were deducted six points on 5 February 2026 due to breaching PSR rules. Their appeal against the points deduction was dismissed on 8 April 2026.)	23rd	R4	R1			(England) Jordan James	11	28,907
2026–27	Lge 1	3	46								R1	R1	EFL Trophy	SR1			

== Key ==
- Div 1 = Football League First Division
- Div 2 = Football League Second Division
- Prem = Premier League
- Champ = Football League Championship
- Lge 1 = Football League One
- N/A = Not applicable
- Pld = Matches played
- W = Matches won
- D = Matches drawn
- L = Matches lost
- GF = Goals for
- GA = Goals against
- Pts = Points won
- Pos = Final position
- 1Q = First qualifying round
- 2Q = First qualifying round
- 3Q = Third qualifying round
- 4Q = Fourth qualifying round
- 5Q = Fifth qualifying round
- PO = Play-off round
- INT = Intermediate round
- NRU = Northern area runners-up
- PR = Preliminary round
- GS = Group stage
- R1 = Round 1
- R2 = Round 2
- R3 = Round 3
- R4 = Round 4
- R5 = Round 5
- QF = Quarter-finals
- SF = Semi-finals
- R/U = Runners-up
- W = Winners

Champions	Runners-up	Play-offs	Promoted	Relegated	Semi-finals

Note: Bold text indicates a competition won.
Note 2: Where fields are left blank, the club did not participate in a competition that season.
