= Frederick Osborne (disambiguation) =

Frederick Osborne (1909–1996) was an Australian politician and government minister.

Frederick Osborn(e) may also refer to:

- Fred Osborn (1883–1954), Canadian baseball player
- Fred Osborne (1865–?), Major League Baseball pitcher and outfielder
- Frederic Osborn (1885–1978), urban planner
- Frederick Osborn (sportsman) (1889–1954), English cricketer and footballer
- Frederick Osborn (1889–1981), American philanthropist, military leader, and eugenicist
- Frederick Ernest Osborne (1878–1948), Canadian politician
