= Thomas Galbraith =

Thomas Galbraith may refer to:

- Thomas Galbraith, 1st Baron Strathclyde (1891–1985), Scottish Unionist Party politician
- Tam Galbraith (Sir Thomas Galloway Dunlop Galbraith, 1917–1982), Scottish Unionist politician
- Thomas Galbraith, 2nd Baron Strathclyde (born 1960), British Conservative politician
- Thomas J. Galbraith (1825–1909), American politician
- Tommy Galbraith (1875–?), Scottish footballer
