= 1956–57 Leicester City F.C. season =

1956–57 season of Leicester City

Leicester City
1956–57 season
- Manager: Dave Halliday
- Second Division: 1st
- FA Cup: 3rd Round
- Top goalscorer: League: Arthur Rowley (44); All: Arthur Rowley (44)
Home colours

The 1956–57 season was Leicester City's 52nd season in the Football League and their 38th (non-consecutive) season in the second tier of English football.

Leicester ran away with the Second Division title, winning it by a clear 7 points to claim the club's 4th Second Division title and their second title in four years.

Legendary striker Arthur Rowley set the club record for the most goals in a single season by scoring 44 goals in 43 appearances. The club's tally of 109 league goals during the season also remains a club record.

== League table ==
Pos	Team	Pld	W	D	L	GF	GA	GAv	Pts	Qualification or relegation
1	Leicester City (C, P)	42	25	11	6	109	67	1.627	61	Promotion to the First Division
2	Nottingham Forest (P)	42	22	10	10	94	55	1.709	54	Promotion to the First Division
3	Liverpool	42	21	11	10	82	54	1.519	53	
4	Blackburn Rovers	42	21	10	11	83	75	1.107	52	
5	Stoke City	42	20	8	14	83	58	1.431	48	

Rules for classification: 1) Points; 2) Goal average; 3) Goals scored
(C) Champions; (P) Promoted

== Club statistics ==
All data from: Dave Smith and Paul Taylor, Of Fossils and Foxes: The Official Definitive History of Leicester City Football Club (2001) (ISBN 1-899538-21-6)

=== Appearances ===
Pos.	Nat.	Name	Div 2	FAC	Total
GK	(Scotland)	Dave MacLaren	27	1	28
GK	(England)	George Heyes	14	0	14
GK	(England)	Harvey Sinclair	1	0	1
DF	(England)	Stan Milburn	42	1	43
DF	(Scotland)	John Ogilvie	38	1	39
DF	(England)	Jack Froggatt	42	1	43
DF	(Scotland)	Bill Webb	3	0	3
DF	(England)	Willie Cunningham	1	0	1
MF	(Scotland)	Pat Ward	27	0	27
MF	(England)	Colin Appleton	15	1	16
MF	(Scotland)	Jimmy Moran	3	0	3
FW	(England)	Johnny Morris	42	1	43
FW	(Scotland)	Tommy McDonald	31	1	32
FW	(Scotland)	Ian McNeill	38	1	39
FW	(Scotland)	Willie Gardiner	13	0	13
FW	(England)	Arthur Rowley	42	1	43
FW	(England)	Derek Hogg	36	0	36
FW	(England)	Derek Hines	29	1	30
FW	(Scotland)	Jimmy Walsh	1	0	1
FW	(England)	Billy Wright	17	1	18

=== Top goalscorers ===
Pos.	Nat.	Name	Div 1	FAC	Total
1	(England)	Arthur Rowley	44	0	44
2	(Scotland)	Ian McNeill	18	0	18
3	(England)	Derek Hines	14	0	14
4	(England)	Billy Wright	10	0	10
5	(Scotland)	Tommy McDonald	7	0	7
6	(England)	Derek Hogg	5	0	5
7	(Scotland)	Willie Gardiner	4	0	4
8	(England)	Stan Milburn	1	0	1
=	(England)	Johnny Morris	1	0	1
=	(England)	Colin Appleton	1	0	1
=	(Scotland)	Jimmy Moran	1	0	1
Own goals			3	0	3
