= 2020–21 Leicester City F.C. season =

English football club season

Leicester City
2020–21 season
- Owner: King Power International Group
- Chairman: Aiyawatt Srivaddhanaprabha
- Manager: Brendan Rodgers
- Stadium: King Power Stadium
- Premier League: 5th
- FA Cup: Winners
- EFL Cup: Third round
- UEFA Europa League: Round of 32
- Top goalscorer: League: Jamie Vardy (15); All: Kelechi Iheanacho (19)
- Highest home attendance: 8,000 vs Tottenham Hotspur (23 May 2021, Premier League)
- Lowest home attendance: 8,000 vs Tottenham Hotspur (23 May 2021, Premier League)
- Average home league attendance: 8,000
Home colours	Away colours	Third colours

The 2020–21 Leicester City F.C. season was the club's 116th season in existence and their 53rd (non-consecutive) season in the top tier of English football. This was their seventh consecutive season in the Premier League. In addition to the domestic league, they also competed in the season's editions of the FA Cup, the EFL Cup and the UEFA Europa League. The season covered the period from 27 July 2020 to 30 June 2021.

This was the first season since 2005–06 not to feature Andy King, who left the club upon the expiration of his contract.

Leicester won their first FA Cup title, after beating Chelsea 1–0 in the final.

== Kits ==
Home	Home 2021–22	Away	Third	Third alt.

Goalkeeper 1	Goalkeeper 2	Goalkeeper 3	Goalkeeper 2021-22

== Transfers ==
=== In ===
Date	Position	Nationality	Name	From	Fee	Team	Ref.
1 July 2020	AM	(Thailand)	Thanawat Suengchitthawon	(France) AS Nancy	Free transfer	Under-23s	
3 September 2020	RB/RWB/LM	(Belgium)	Timothy Castagne	(Italy) Atalanta	£21,000,000	First team	
4 September 2020	CM	(United States)	Zach Booth	(United States) Real Salt Lake	Undisclosed	Under-23s	
2 October 2020	CB	(France)	Wesley Fofana	(France) Saint-Étienne	£30,000,000	First team	
3 December 2020	CF	(England)	Jacob Wakeling	(England) Alvechurch	Undisclosed	Under-23s	

=== Out ===
Date	Position	Nationality	Name	To	Fee	Team	Ref.
1 July 2020	LB	(England)	Calvin Bassey	(Scotland) Rangers	Free transfer	Under-23s	
1 July 2020	RW	(Brunei)	Faiq Bolkiah	(Portugal) Maritimo	Released	Under-23s	
1 July 2020	GK	(Wales)	Rhys Davies	(England) Belper Town	Released	Under-23s	
1 July 2020	RB	(England)	Ed Elewa-Ikpakwu	(England) Lancaster City	Released	Under-23s	
1 July 2020	GK	(Sweden)	Viktor Johansson	(England) Rotherham United	Released	Under-23s	
1 July 2020	CB	(Netherlands)	Justen Kranthove	(Czech Republic) Slovan Liberec	Released	Under-23s	
1 July 2020	CF	(England)	Ryan Loft	(England) Scunthorpe United	Released	Under-23s	
1 July 2020	AM	(Republic of Ireland)	Conor Tee	(England) Brackley	Released	Under-23s	
1 July 2020	AM	(Wales)	George Thomas	(England) Queens Park Rangers	Released	First team	
27 July 2020	CM	(Wales)	Andy King	(Belgium) OH Leuven	Released	First team	
13 August 2020	AM	(Poland)	Bartosz Kapustka	(Poland) Legia Warsaw	Undisclosed	First team	
20 August 2020	RB	(England)	Connor Barrett	(England) Burnley	Free transfer	Academy	
26 August 2020	LB	(England)	Ben Chilwell	(England) Chelsea	£50,000,000	First team	
31 August 2020	CM	(England)	Liam Loughlan	(England) Salford City	Free transfer	Academy	
25 September 2020	RW	(Mali)	Fousseni Diabaté	(Turkey) Trabzonspor	Undisclosed	First team	
3 October 2020	CM	(Portugal)	Adrien Silva	(Italy) Sampdoria	Undisclosed	First team	
13 January 2021	CF	(Algeria)	Islam Slimani	(France) Lyon	Free transfer	First team	
31 January 2021	LW	(England)	Demarai Gray	(Germany) Bayer Leverkusen	£2,000,000	First team	

=== Loans in ===
Date from	Position	Nationality	Name	From	Date until	Team	Ref.
20 September 2020	RW	(Turkey)	Cengiz Ünder	(Italy) Roma	End of season	First team	

=== Loans out ===
Date from	Position	Nationality	Name	To	Date until	Team	Ref.
11 August 2020	GK	(Denmark)	Daniel Iversen	(Belgium) OH Leuven	6 January 2021	Under-23s	
16 September 2020	CF	(England)	George Hirst	(England) Rotherham United	End of season	Under-23s	
24 September 2020	CF	(Belgium)	Josh Eppiah	(Belgium) OH Leuven	End of season	Under-23s	
29 September 2020	CB	(England)	Darnell Johnson	(England) Wigan Athletic	4 January 2021	Under-23s	
5 October 2020	RW	(Algeria)	Rachid Ghezzal	(Turkey) Beşiktaş	End of season	First team	
5 October 2020	CB	(England)	Josh Knight	(England) Wycombe Wanderers	End of season	Under-23s	
9 October 2020	RB	(Wales)	Mitch Clark	(England) Port Vale	January 2021	Under-23s	
9 October 2020	CB	(England)	Sam Hughes	(England) Burton Albion	January 2021	Under-23s	
16 October 2020	CB	(Croatia)	Filip Benković	(Wales) Cardiff City	6 January 2021	First team	
16 October 2020	DM	(England)	Kiernan Dewsbury-Hall	(England) Luton Town	End of season	Under-23s	
16 October 2020	CM	(England)	Matty James	(England) Barnsley	5 January 2021	First team	
5 January 2021	CF	(Zimbabwe)	Admiral Muskwe	(England) Wycombe Wanderers	End of season	Under-23s	
6 January 2021	CM	(England)	Matty James	(England) Coventry City	End of season	First team	
7 January 2021	GK	(Denmark)	Daniel Iversen	(England) Preston North End	End of season	Under-23s	
12 January 2021	CB	(Croatia)	Filip Benković	(Belgium) OH Leuven	End of season	First team	
25 January 2021	CB	(England)	Darnell Johnson	(England) AFC Wimbledon	End of season	Under-23s	
1 February 2021	CM	(England)	Callum Wright	(England) Cheltenham Town	End of season	Under-23s	

== Pre-season and friendlies ==
Win Draw Loss Fixtures

26 August 2020 Friendly	Birmingham City	0–2	Leicester City	Birmingham
13:00 BST		Report	Dewsbury-Hall 53'; Albrighton 71'	Stadium: Wast Hills Training Ground

29 August 2020 Friendly	Leicester City	0–0	Sheffield Wednesday	Loughborough
12:00 BST		Report		Stadium: Loughborough University Stadium

5 September 2020 Friendly	Leicester City	1–1	Blackburn Rovers	Leicester
13:00 BST	Amartey 67'	Report	Williams 81'	Stadium: King Power Stadium

== Competitions ==
=== Overview ===
Competition	First match	Last match	Starting round	Final position	Record							
Competition	First match	Last match	Starting round	Final position	Pld	W	D	L	GF	GA	GD	Win %
Premier League	13 September 2020	23 May 2021	Matchday 1	5th	38	20	6	12	68	50	+18	52.63
FA Cup	9 January 2021	15 May 2021	Third round	Winners	6	6	0	0	13	2	+11	100.00
EFL Cup	23 September 2020		Third round	Third round	1	0	0	1	0	2	−2	0.00
UEFA Europa League	22 October 2020	25 February 2021	Group stage	Round of 32	8	4	2	2	14	7	+7	50.00
Total					53	30	8	15	95	61	+34	56.60

Source: Competitions

=== Premier League ===
==== League table ====
Pos	Team	Pld	W	D	L	GF	GA	GD	Pts	Qualification or relegation
3	Liverpool	38	20	9	9	68	42	+26	69	Qualification for the Champions League group stage
4	Chelsea	38	19	10	9	58	36	+22	67	Qualification for the Champions League group stage
5	Leicester City	38	20	6	12	68	50	+18	66	Qualification for the Europa League group stage (Note: Since the winners of the 2020–21 FA Cup, Leicester City, also qualified for the Europa League based on league position, the second Europa League group stage berth allocated to England was transferred to the sixth-placed team.)
6	West Ham United	38	19	8	11	62	47	+15	65	Qualification for the Europa League group stage
7	Tottenham Hotspur	38	18	8	12	68	45	+23	62	Qualification for the Europa Conference League play-off round (Note: Since the winners of the 2020–21 EFL Cup, Manchester City, qualified for European competition based on league position, the Europa Conference League berth awarded to the EFL Cup winners was transferred to the highest-placed Premier League team not already qualified for European competition, the seventh-placed team.)

Source: Premier League
Rules for classification: 1) Points; 2) Goal difference; 3) Goals scored; 4) If the champions, relegated teams or qualified teams for UEFA competitions cannot be determined by rules 1 to 3, rules 4.1 to 4.3 are applied – 4.1) Points gained in head-to-head record between such teams; 4.2) Away goals scored in head-to-head record between such teams; 4.3) Play-offs

==== Results summary ====
Overall								Home						Away					
Pld	W	D	L	GF	GA	GD	Pts	W	D	L	GF	GA	GD	W	D	L	GF	GA	GD
38	20	6	12	68	50	+18	66	9	1	9	34	30	+4	11	5	3	34	20	+14

==== Results by matchday ====
Matchday	1	2	3	4	5	6	7	8	9	10	11	12	13	14	15	16	17	18	19	20	21	22	23	24	25	26	27	28	29	30	31	32	33	34	35	36	37	38
Ground	A	H	A	H	H	A	A	H	A	H	A	H	H	A	H	A	A	H	H	A	H	A	A	H	A	H	A	A	H	H	A	H	H	A	H	A	A	H
Result	W	W	W	L	L	W	W	W	L	L	W	W	L	W	D	D	W	W	W	D	L	W	D	W	W	L	D	W	W	L	L	W	W	D	L	W	L	L
Position	2	1	1	3	4	4	2	1	4	4	4	3	4	2	3	3	3	3	3	3	4	3	3	3	3	3	3	3	3	3	3	3	3	3	4	3	5	5

A = Away; H = Home; W = Win; D = Draw; L = Loss

==== Matches ====
The league fixtures were announced on 20 August 2020.

13 September 2020 1	West Bromwich Albion	0–3	Leicester City	West Bromwich
14:00 BST	Ajayi (yellow card) 63'	Report	Justin (yellow card) 16'; Castagne 56'; Vardy 74' (pen.), 84' (pen.)	Stadium: The Hawthorns; Attendance: 0 Referee: Anthony Taylor

20 September 2020 2	Leicester City	4–2	Burnley	Leicester
19:00 BST	Barnes 20'; Mendy (yellow card) 25'; Pieters 50' (o.g.); Justin 61'; Praet 79'	Report	Rodriguez (yellow card) 8'; Wood 10'; Dunne 73'; Bardsley (yellow card) 90+1'	Stadium: King Power Stadium; Attendance: 0 Referee: Lee Mason

27 September 2020 3	Manchester City	2–5	Leicester City	Manchester
16:30 BST	Mahrez 4'; Aké (yellow card) 60', (goal) 84'	Report	Tielemans (yellow card) 22', (goal) 88' (pen.); Vardy 37' (pen.), 54', 58' (pen.); Söyüncü (yellow card) 47'; Amartey (yellow card) 51'; Maddison 77'	Stadium: City of Manchester Stadium; Attendance: 0 Referee: Michael Oliver

4 October 2020 4	Leicester City	0–3	West Ham United	Leicester
12:00 BST	Mendy (yellow card) 24'; Evans (yellow card) 53'	Report	Antonio 14'; Fornals 34', (yellow card) 67'; Coufal (yellow card) 80'; Bowen 83'	Stadium: King Power Stadium; Attendance: 0 Referee: Andrew Madley

18 October 2020 5	Leicester City	0–1	Aston Villa	Leicester
19:15 BST	Pérez (yellow card) 31'; Tielemans (yellow card) 41'; Castagne (yellow card) 73'; Evans (yellow card) 74'	Report	McGinn (yellow card) 32'; Cash (yellow card) 40'; Luiz (yellow card) 70'; Barkley 90+1'	Stadium: King Power Stadium; Attendance: 0 Referee: Jonathan Moss

25 October 2020 6	Arsenal	0–1	Leicester City	Holloway
19:15 GMT	Bellerín (yellow card) 30'; Lacazette (yellow card) 57'; Xhaka (yellow card) 90+5'	Report	Fuchs (yellow card) 32'; Tielemans (yellow card) 41'; Fofana (yellow card) 52'; Maddison (yellow card) 67'; Evans (yellow card) 74'; Vardy 80'	Stadium: Emirates Stadium; Attendance: 0 Referee: Craig Pawson

2 November 2020 7	Leeds United	1–4	Leicester City	Leeds
20:00 GMT	Dallas 48', (yellow card) 50'	Report	Barnes 2'; Tielemans 21', 90+1' (pen.); Vardy 76'; Thomas (yellow card) 84'	Stadium: Elland Road; Attendance: 0 Referee: Andre Marriner

8 November 2020 8	Leicester City	1–0	Wolverhampton Wanderers	Leicester
14:00 GMT	Vardy 15' (pen.); Evans (yellow card) 63'; Fofana (yellow card) 81'	Report	Dendoncker (yellow card) 41'; Neves (yellow card) 50'; Kilman (yellow card) 90+3'	Stadium: King Power Stadium; Attendance: 0 Referee: Anthony Taylor

22 November 2020 9	Liverpool	3–0	Leicester City	Liverpool
19:15 GMT	Evans 21' (o.g.); Jota 41'; Firmino 86'	Report	Justin (yellow card) 45'; Mendy (yellow card) 66'	Stadium: Anfield; Attendance: 0 Referee: Chris Kavanagh

30 November 2020 10	Leicester City	1–2	Fulham	Leicester
17:30 GMT	Barnes 86'	Report	Reed (yellow card) 18'; Lookman 30'; Cavaleiro 38' (pen.); Adarabioyo (yellow card) 89'	Stadium: King Power Stadium; Attendance: 0 Referee: Simon Hooper

6 December 2020 11	Sheffield United	1–2	Leicester City	Sheffield
14:15 GMT	McBurnie 26'; Lowe (yellow card) 38'	Report	Pérez 24'; Fuchs (yellow card) 63'; Vardy 90', (yellow card) 90+1'; Maddison (yellow card) 90+2'	Stadium: Bramall Lane; Attendance: 0 Referee: Stuart Attwell

13 December 2020 12	Leicester City	3–0	Brighton & Hove Albion	Leicester
19:15 GMT	Fuchs (yellow card) 22'; Maddison 27', 44'; Vardy 41'; Evans (yellow card) 78'	Report	Burn (yellow card) 72'	Stadium: King Power Stadium; Attendance: 0 Referee: Martin Atkinson

16 December 2020 13	Leicester City	0–2	Everton	Leicester
18:00 GMT	Mendy (yellow card) 15'; Fuchs (yellow card) 87'	Report	Richarlison 21'; Holgate (yellow card) 49', (goal) 72'; Godfrey (yellow card) 49'; Gomes (yellow card) 64'	Stadium: King Power Stadium; Attendance: 0 Referee: Lee Mason

20 December 2020 14	Tottenham Hotspur	0–2	Leicester City	Tottenham
14:15 GMT	Dier (yellow card) 79'; Winks (yellow card) 81'	Report	Albrighton (yellow card) 32'; Vardy 45+4' (pen.); Alderweireld 59' (o.g.); Ndidi (yellow card) 72'	Stadium: Tottenham Hotspur Stadium; Attendance: 0 Referee: Craig Pawson

26 December 2020 15	Leicester City	2–2	Manchester United	Leicester
12:30 GMT	Barnes 31'; Maddison (yellow card) 54'; Tuanzebe 85' (o.g.); Ndidi (yellow card) 89'	Report	Rashford 23'; Fernandes (yellow card) 45+1', (goal) 79'	Stadium: King Power Stadium; Attendance: 0 Referee: Mike Dean

28 December 2020 16	Crystal Palace	1–1	Leicester City	Selhurst
15:00 GMT	Zaha 58'	Report	Choudhury (yellow card) 51'; Barnes 83'	Stadium: Selhurst Park; Attendance: 0 Referee: Graham Scott

3 January 2021 17	Newcastle United	1–2	Leicester City	Newcastle upon Tyne
14:15 GMT	Carroll 82'	Report	Maddison 55'; Tielemans (yellow card) 60', (goal) 72'; Justin (yellow card) 81'	Stadium: St James' Park; Attendance: 0 Referee: Robert Jones

16 January 2021 18	Leicester City	2–0	Southampton	Leicester
20:00 GMT	Fofana (yellow card) 15'; Maddison 37'; Albrighton (yellow card) 45'; Barnes 90+5'	Report	Diallo (yellow card) 44'; Bertrand (yellow card) 59'	Stadium: King Power Stadium; Attendance: 0 Referee: Stuart Attwell

19 January 2021 19	Leicester City	2–0	Chelsea	Leicester
20:15 GMT	Ndidi 6'; Maddison 41'; Fofana (yellow card) 85'	Report	Havertz (yellow card) 29'; Kovačić (yellow card) 51'; Ziyech (yellow card) 89'	Stadium: King Power Stadium; Attendance: 0 Referee: Craig Pawson

27 January 2021 20	Everton	1–1	Leicester City	Liverpool
20:15 GMT	Rodríguez 30', (yellow card) 63'	Report	Justin (yellow card) 45'; Tielemans 67'	Stadium: Goodison Park; Attendance: 0 Referee: Mike Dean

31 January 2021 21	Leicester City	1–3	Leeds United	Leicester
14:00 GMT	Barnes 13'	Report	Dallas 15', (yellow card) 62'; Ayling (yellow card) 38'; Bamford 70'; Klich (yellow card) 74'; Harrison 84'	Stadium: King Power Stadium; Attendance: 0 Referee: Chris Kavanagh

3 February 2021 22	Fulham	0–2	Leicester City	Fulham
18:00 GMT	Reed (yellow card) 24'; Aina (yellow card) 59'; Cavaleiro (yellow card) 89'	Report	Iheanacho 17'; Justin 44'; Mendy (yellow card) 72'	Stadium: Craven Cottage; Attendance: 0 Referee: Robert Jones

7 February 2021 23	Wolverhampton Wanderers	0–0	Leicester City	Wolverhampton
14:00 GMT	Neves (yellow card) 45+1'	Report	Evans (yellow card) 32'; Söyüncü (yellow card) 54'; Maddison (yellow card) 62'	Stadium: Molineux; Attendance: 0 Referee: Martin Atkinson

13 February 2021 24	Leicester City	3–1	Liverpool	Leicester
12:30 GMT	Evans (yellow card) 43'; Maddison 78'; Vardy 81'; Barnes 85'	Report	Jones (yellow card) 24'; Salah 67'; Kabak (yellow card) 71'	Stadium: King Power Stadium; Attendance: 0 Referee: Anthony Taylor

21 February 2021 25	Aston Villa	1–2	Leicester City	Aston
14:05 GMT	Traoré 48'; Luiz (yellow card) 51'; Elmohamady (yellow card) 59'	Report	Maddison 19'; Barnes 23'; Ndidi (yellow card) 34'	Stadium: Villa Park; Attendance: 0 Referee: Michael Oliver

28 February 2021 26	Leicester City	1–3	Arsenal	Leicester
12:00 GMT	Tielemans 6', (yellow card) 72'; Thomas (yellow card) 38'	Report	Luiz 39'; Lacazette 45+2' (pen.); Pépé 52'; Tierney (yellow card) 90+3'	Stadium: King Power Stadium; Attendance: 0 Referee: Paul Tierney

3 March 2021 27	Burnley	1–1	Leicester City	Burnley
18:00 GMT	Vydra 4'	Report	Iheanacho 34'; Fofana (yellow card) 79'; Pereira (yellow card) 90+2'	Stadium: Turf Moor; Attendance: 0 Referee: Andrew Madley

6 March 2021 28	Brighton & Hove Albion	1–2	Leicester City	Falmer
20:00 GMT	Lallana 10'	Report	Iheanacho 62'; Tielemans (yellow card) 76'; Amartey 87'	Stadium: Falmer Stadium; Attendance: 0 Referee: Michael Oliver

14 March 2021 29	Leicester City	5–0	Sheffield United	Leicester
14:00 GMT	Iheanacho 39', 69', 78'; Pérez 64'; Ampadu 80' (o.g.)	Report	Bryan (yellow card) 74'; Lundstram (yellow card) 88'	Stadium: King Power Stadium; Attendance: 0 Referee: Peter Bankes

3 April 2021 30	Leicester City	0–2	Manchester City	Leicester
17:30 BST	Ndidi (yellow card) 32'; Amartey (yellow card) 87'	Report	Mendy 58'; Ederson (yellow card) 73'; Gabriel Jesus 74'; Fernandinho (yellow card) 82'; Rodri (yellow card) 90'	Stadium: King Power Stadium; Attendance: 0 Referee: Anthony Taylor

11 April 2021 31	West Ham United	3–2	Leicester City	Stratford
14:05 BST	Souček (yellow card) 10'; Lingard 29', 44'; Cresswell (yellow card) 30'; Bowen 48'; Masuaku (yellow card) 90+2'	Report	Pereira (yellow card) 33'; Fofana (yellow card) 45+2'; Ndidi (yellow card) 46'; Iheanacho 70', 90+1'	Stadium: London Stadium; Attendance: 0 Referee: Mike Dean

22 April 2021 32	Leicester City	3–0	West Bromwich Albion	Leicester
20:00 BST	Vardy 23'; Evans 26'; Iheanacho 36'	Report	Yokuşlu (yellow card) 57'; Bartley (yellow card) 79'	Stadium: King Power Stadium; Attendance: 0 Referee: Andrew Madley

26 April 2021 33	Leicester City	2–1	Crystal Palace	Leicester
20:00 BST	Castagne 50'; Iheanacho 80'	Report	Zaha 12'; Riedewald (yellow card) 18'	Stadium: King Power Stadium; Attendance: 0 Referee: Graham Scott

30 April 2021 34	Southampton	1–1	Leicester City	Southampton
20:00 BST	Vestergaard (red card) 10'; Minamino (yellow card) 50'; Ward-Prowse 61' (pen.)	Report	Evans 68'	Stadium: St Mary's Stadium; Attendance: 0 Referee: Robert Jones

7 May 2021 35	Leicester City	2–4	Newcastle United	Leicester
20:00 BST	Iheanacho (yellow card) 72', (goal) 87'; Albrighton 80'	Report	Willock 22'; Dummett 34'; Krafth (yellow card) 57'; Wilson 64', 73'	Stadium: King Power Stadium; Attendance: 0 Referee: Darren England

11 May 2021 36	Manchester United	1–2	Leicester City	Old Trafford
18:00 BST	Greenwood 15'	Report	Thomas 10'; Söyüncü 66'	Stadium: Old Trafford; Attendance: 0 Referee: Craig Pawson

18 May 2021 37	Chelsea	2–1	Leicester City	Fulham
20:15 BST	Rüdiger 47'; Jorginho 66' (pen.); Azpilicueta (yellow card) 87'; Mendy (yellow card) 90+1'	Report	Pérez (yellow card) 32'; Iheanacho 76'; Fofana (yellow card) 82'; Ndidi (yellow card) 89'; Pereira (yellow card) 90+4'; Amartey (yellow card) 90+5'	Stadium: Stamford Bridge; Attendance: 10,000; Referee: Mike Dean

23 May 2021 38	Leicester City	2–4	Tottenham Hotspur	Leicester
16:00 BST	Vardy 18' (pen.), 52' (pen.)	Report	Kane 41'; Bergwijn (yellow card) 58'; Schmeichel 76' (o.g.); Winks (yellow card) 83'; Bale 87', 90+6'	Stadium: King Power Stadium; Attendance: 8,000; Referee: Anthony Taylor

=== FA Cup ===
The third round draw was made on 30 November, with Premier League and EFL Championship clubs all entering the competition. The fourth and fifth round draws were made consecutively on 11 January.

9 January 2021 Third round	Stoke City	0–4	Leicester City	Stoke-on-Trent
15:00 GMT	Batth (yellow card) 37'	Report	Fofana (yellow card) 28'; Justin 34'; Albrighton 59'; Pérez 79'; Barnes 81'	Stadium: Bet365 Stadium; Attendance: 0 Referee: Tony Harrington

24 January 2021 Fourth round	Brentford	1–3	Leicester City	Brentford
14:30 GMT	Sørensen 6'; Žambůrek (yellow card) 21'	Report	Ünder 46'; Tielemans 51' (pen.); Maddison 71'	Stadium: Brentford Community Stadium; Attendance: 0 Referee: Michael Oliver

10 February 2021 Fifth round	Leicester City	1–0	Brighton & Hove Albion	Leicester
19:30 GMT	Pérez (yellow card) 44'; Tielemans (yellow card) 52'; Iheanacho 90+4'	Report	Bissouma (yellow card) 90+1'	Stadium: King Power Stadium; Attendance: 0 Referee: Mike Dean

21 March 2021 Quarter-finals	Leicester City	3–1	Manchester United	Leicester
17:00 GMT	Iheanacho 24', 78'; Tielemans 52'; Albrighton (yellow card) 69'; Evans (yellow card) 76'	Report	Maguire (yellow card) 30'; Greenwood 38'; McTominay (yellow card) 72'	Stadium: King Power Stadium; Attendance: 0 Referee: Andre Marriner

18 April 2021 Semi-finals	Leicester City	1–0	Southampton	Wembley
18:30 BST	Söyüncü (yellow card) 49'; Iheanacho 55'	Report	Diallo (yellow card) 5'; Bednarek (yellow card) 90+1'	Stadium: Wembley Stadium; Attendance: 4,000; Referee: Chris Kavanagh

15 May 2021 Final	Chelsea	0–1	Leicester City	Wembley
17:15 BST	Werner (yellow card) 40'	Report	Fofana (yellow card) 35'; Tielemans 63'	Stadium: Wembley Stadium; Attendance: 20,000; Referee: Michael Oliver

=== EFL Cup ===
The draw for both the second and third round were confirmed on 6 September, live on Sky Sports by Phil Babb.

23 September 2020 Third round	Leicester City	0–2	Arsenal	Leicester
19:45 BST		Report	Elneny (yellow card) 13'; Fuchs 57' (o.g.); Nketiah 90'	Stadium: King Power Stadium; Attendance: 0 Referee: Peter Bankes

=== UEFA Europa League ===
==== Group stage ====
The group stage draw was held on 2 October 2020.

Pos	Team	Pld	W	D	L	GF	GA	GD	Pts	Qualification	LEI	BRA	ZOR	AEK
1	(England) Leicester City	6	4	1	1	14	5	+9	13 (Note: Head-to-head points: Leicester City 4, Braga 1.)	Advance to knockout phase	—	4–0	3–0	2–0
2	(Portugal) Braga	6	4	1	1	14	10	+4	13	Advance to knockout phase	3–3	—	2–0	3–0
3	(Ukraine) Zorya Luhansk	6	2	0	4	6	11	−5	6		1–0	1–2	—	1–4
4	(Greece) AEK Athens	6	1	0	5	7	15	−8	3		1–2	2–4	0–3	—

Source: UEFA
Rules for classification: Group stage tiebreakers
Notes:

22 October 2020 1	Leicester City (England)	3–0	(Ukraine) Zorya Luhansk	Leicester, England
20:00 BST (UTC+1)	Tielemans (yellow card) 12'; Maddison 29'; Barnes 45'; Iheanacho 67'	Report	Kabayev (yellow card) 22'; Vernydub (yellow card) 77'	Stadium: King Power Stadium; Attendance: 0 Referee: Stéphanie Frappart (France)

29 October 2020 2	AEK Athens (Greece)	1–2	(England) Leicester City	Athens, Greece
19:55 EET (UTC+2)	Mantalos (yellow card) 21'; Tanković 49'; Krstičić (yellow card) 59'; Insúa (yellow card) 73'	Report	Vardy 18' (pen.); Choudhury 39'; Thomas (yellow card) 78'	Stadium: Olympic Stadium; Attendance: 0 Referee: Harald Lechner (Austria)

5 November 2020 3	Leicester City (England)	4–0	(Portugal) Braga	Leicester, England
20:00 GMT (UTC±0)	Iheanacho 21', 48', (yellow card) 69'; Albrighton (yellow card) 43'; Praet 67'; Maddison 78'	Report	Esgaio (yellow card) 45+2'; Carmo (yellow card) 90+1'	Stadium: King Power Stadium; Attendance: 0 Referee: Bas Nijhuis (Netherlands)

26 November 2020 4	Braga (Portugal)	3–3	(England) Leicester City	Braga, Portugal
17:55 WET (UTC±0)	Elmusrati 4', (yellow card) 65'; Paulinho 24', (yellow card) 84'; Fransérgio 90+1'; Schettine (yellow card) 90+2'	Report	Barnes 9'; Albrighton (yellow card) 52'; Evans (yellow card) 53'; Thomas 79'; Vardy 90+5'	Stadium: Estádio Municipal; Attendance: 0 Referee: Daniele Orsato (Italy)

3 December 2020 5	Zorya Luhansk (Ukraine)	1–0	(England) Leicester City	Zaporizhzhia, Ukraine
19:55 EET (UTC+2)	Cigaņiks (yellow card) 32'; Nazaryna (yellow card) 74'; Sayyadmanesh 84'	Report	Pereira (yellow card) 42'; Iheanacho (yellow card) 45+1'; Mendy (yellow card) 58'; Fofana (yellow card) 87'	Stadium: Slavutych-Arena; Attendance: 0 Referee: Espen Eskås (Norway)

10 December 2020 6	Leicester City (England)	2–0	(Greece) AEK Athens	Leicester, England
20:00 GMT (UTC±0)	Ünder 12'; Barnes 14'	Report	Hnid (yellow card) 24'	Stadium: King Power Stadium; Attendance: 0 Referee: Lawrence Visser (Belgium)

==== Round of 32 ====
The draw for the round of 32 was held on 14 December 2020.

18 February 2021 First leg	Slavia Prague (Czech Republic)	0–0	(England) Leicester City	Prague, Czech Republic
18:55 CET (UTC+1)	Bořil (yellow card) 27'	Report	Ndidi (yellow card) 46'; Iheanacho (yellow card) 65'; Tielemans (yellow card) 81'	Stadium: Sinobo Stadium; Attendance: 600; Referee: Marco Guida (Italy)

25 February 2021 Second leg	Leicester City (England)	0–2 (0–2 agg.)	(Czech Republic) Slavia Prague	Leicester, England
20:00 GMT (UTC±0)	Söyüncü (yellow card) 84'; Barnes (yellow card) 88'	Report	Provod 49', (yellow card) 82'; Zima (yellow card) 73'; Sima 79'; Kolář (yellow card) 90+1'	Stadium: King Power Stadium; Attendance: 0 Referee: Serdar Gözübüyük (Netherlands)

== Squad statistics ==
=== Appearances ===
- Italics indicate a loaned player

No.	Pos	Nat	Player	Total		Premier League		FA Cup		League Cup		Europa League	
No.	Pos	Nat	Player	Apps	Goals	Apps	Goals	Apps	Goals	Apps	Goals	Apps	Goals
1	GK	(Denmark)	Kasper Schmeichel	48	0	38	0	4	0	0	0	6	0
2	DF	(England)	James Justin	31	3	23	2	2	1	0	0	5+1	0
3	DF	(France)	Wesley Fofana	38	0	27+1	0	4	0	0	0	4+2	0
4	DF	(Turkey)	Çağlar Söyüncü	32	1	19+4	1	5+1	0	0	0	3	0
5	DF	(Jamaica)	Wes Morgan	10	0	0+3	0	0+1	0	1	0	2+3	0
6	DF	(Northern Ireland)	Jonny Evans	37	2	28	2	4	0	0	0	5	0
8	MF	(Belgium)	Youri Tielemans	51	9	37+1	6	6	3	0	0	6+1	0
9	FW	(England)	Jamie Vardy	42	17	31+3	15	4	0	0	0	3+1	2
10	MF	(England)	James Maddison	42	11	24+7	8	1+3	1	1	0	4+2	2
11	MF	(England)	Marc Albrighton	42	2	17+14	1	2+3	1	1	0	5	0
12	GK	(Wales)	Danny Ward	5	0	0	0	2	0	1	0	2	0
14	FW	(Nigeria)	Kelechi Iheanacho	39	19	16+9	12	3+3	4	1	0	5+2	3
15	MF	(England)	Harvey Barnes	35	13	22+3	9	2	1	0	0	5+3	3
17	FW	(Spain)	Ayoze Pérez	36	3	15+10	2	6	1	0+1	0	0+4	0
18	DF	(Ghana)	Daniel Amartey	16	1	8+4	1	1	0	1	0	2	0
19	MF	(Turkey)	Cengiz Ünder	19	2	1+8	0	2	1	0	0	6+2	1
20	MF	(England)	Hamza Choudhury	22	1	4+6	0	0+3	0	1	0	5+3	1
21	DF	(Portugal)	Ricardo Pereira	19	0	10+5	0	2	0	0	0	1+1	0
24	MF	(Senegal)	Nampalys Mendy	29	0	15+8	0	1+1	0	0	0	1+3	0
25	MF	(Nigeria)	Wilfred Ndidi	36	1	25+1	1	5+1	0	0	0	4	0
26	MF	(Belgium)	Dennis Praet	24	2	10+5	1	1+1	0	0+1	0	4+2	1
27	DF	(Belgium)	Timothy Castagne	34	2	27	2	4+1	0	0	0	1+1	0
28	DF	(Austria)	Christian Fuchs	16	0	8+1	0	0+1	0	1	0	4+1	0
33	DF	(England)	Luke Thomas	25	2	12+2	1	3	0	1	0	5+2	1
35	GK	(Switzerland)	Eldin Jakupović	0	0	0	0	0	0	0	0	0	0
37	MF	(England)	Ethan Fitzhugh	0	0	0	0	0	0	0	0	0	0
38	MF	(South Africa)	Thakgalo Leshabela	1	0	0+1	0	0	0	0	0	0	0
46	DF	(England)	Vontae Daley-Campbell	1	0	0	0	1	0	0	0	0	0
50	MF	(Portugal)	Sidnei Tavares	3	0	1+1	0	0	0	0	0	0+1	0
51	GK	(Poland)	Jakub Stolarczyk	0	0	0	0	0	0	0	0	0	0
53	DF	(Republic of Ireland)	Shane Flynn	0	0	0	0	0	0	0	0	0	0
59	DF	(Scotland)	Ben Nelson	0	0	0	0	0	0	0	0	0	0
64	MF	(Thailand)	Thanawat Suengchitthawon	0	0	0	0	0	0	0	0	0	0
65	MF	(England)	Tawanda Maswanhise	0	0	0	0	0	0	0	0	0	0
Out on loan:
16	DF	(Croatia)	Filip Benković	0	0	0	0	0	0	0	0	0	0
22	MF	(England)	Matty James	0	0	0	0	0	0	0	0	0	0
31	MF	(Algeria)	Rachid Ghezzal	0	0	0	0	0	0	0	0	0	0
32	MF	(England)	Kiernan Dewsbury-Hall	1	0	0	0	0	0	1	0	0	0
34	DF	(England)	Josh Knight	0	0	0	0	0	0	0	0	0	0
45	FW	(England)	George Hirst	0	0	0	0	0	0	0	0	0	0
No longer at the club:
7	MF	(England)	Demarai Gray	2	0	0+1	0	0	0	1	0	0	0
13	FW	(Algeria)	Islam Slimani	1	0	0+1	0	0	0	0	0	0	0
23	MF	(Portugal)	Adrien Silva	0	0	0	0	0	0	0	0	0	0

=== Goalscorers ===
Rnk	No	Pos	Nat	Name	Premier League	FA Cup	League Cup	Europa League	Total
1	14	FW	(Nigeria)	Kelechi Iheanacho	12	4	0	3	19
2	9	FW	(England)	Jamie Vardy	15	0	0	2	17
3	15	MF	(England)	Harvey Barnes	9	1	0	3	13
4	10	MF	(England)	James Maddison	8	1	0	2	11
5	8	MF	(Belgium)	Youri Tielemans	6	3	0	0	9
6	2	DF	(England)	James Justin	2	1	0	0	3
6	17	FW	(Spain)	Ayoze Pérez	2	1	0	0	3
8	27	DF	(Belgium)	Timothy Castagne	2	0	0	0	2
8	6	DF	(Northern Ireland)	Jonny Evans	2	0	0	0	2
8	11	MF	(England)	Marc Albrighton	1	1	0	0	2
8	26	MF	(Belgium)	Dennis Praet	1	0	0	1	2
8	33	DF	(England)	Luke Thomas	1	0	0	1	2
8	19	MF	(Turkey)	Cengiz Ünder	0	1	0	1	2
14	25	MF	(Nigeria)	Wilfred Ndidi	1	0	0	0	1
14	18	DF	(Ghana)	Daniel Amartey	1	0	0	0	1
14	4	DF	(Turkey)	Çağlar Söyüncü	1	0	0	0	1
14	20	MF	(England)	Hamza Choudhury	0	0	0	1	1
Own goals					4	0	0	0	4
Total					68	13	0	14	95
