= George Dewis =

English footballer

Personal information
- Full name: George Renger Dewis
- Date of birth: 22 January 1913
- Place of birth: Burbage, England
- Date of death: 23 October 1994 (aged 81)
- Place of death: Hinckley, England
- Height: 5 ft 10 in (1.78 m)
- Position: Centre forward

Youth career
- Stoke Golding

Senior career*
Years	Team	Apps	(Gls)
1933	Nuneaton Town		
1933–1950	Leicester City	116	(45)
1941–1942	→ Chesterfield (guest)		
1943–1944	→ Leeds United (guest)		
1944–1945	→ Sheffield United (guest)		
1945–1946	→ Bury Town (guest)		
1945–1946	→ Yeovil & Petters (guest)		
1950–1951	Yeovil Town		
- * Club domestic league appearances and goals

George Renger Dewis (22 January 1913 – 23 October 1994) was an English footballer who played as a centre forward in The Football League between the 1930s and 1950s. Born in Burbage, Leicestershire, he spent the majority of his career with Leicester City, whom he returned to once he retired from playing, becoming part of the coaching staff. Dewis also spent a brief time at Yeovil Town and appeared as a guest player for a number of clubs during World War II.

== Career ==
After playing as a junior for the Stoke Golding village side, Dewis was playing for Nuneaton Town when he was spotted by First Division side Leicester City in 1933. Dewis made his league debut for Leicester on 9 December 1933 in a home fixture against West Bromwich Albion, and remained a mainstay of the club until 1950, scoring 45 goals in 116 league games. The club experienced mixed fortunes during the 1930s and suffered relegation but in 1938–39 Dewis was Leicester's top scorer.

Dewis lost much of his career to the Second World War, spending time in the army while playing for Leicester in the wartime football leagues, as well as guesting for Chesterfield, Leeds United, Sheffield United, Bury Town and Yeovil & Petters.

Following the war Dewis resumed league football with Leicester, and was again their top scorer during the 1946–47 season. In April 1947 he hit a hat-trick for City in a Second Division game against Millwall, which was City's first ever home game against Millwall. With his best years now behind him, Dewis moved to Yeovil Town, for whom he had previously guested during the war, in the summer of 1950, but stayed only one season before retiring.

Following his retirement, Dewis became part of the coaching staff at his former club, Leicester City, initially as a coach, then as a trainer for the youth and reserve teams before finally becoming the club's kit man, a post he held until 1983. During his time as a coach, Dewis played a key role in the rise to prominence of Peter Shilton and Gary Lineker at the club.
