= Ralph Whitehead =

English cricketer

Ralph Whitehead (16 October 1883 – 23 August 1956) was an English cricketer who played first-class cricket for Lancashire from 1908 to 1914. He appeared in 108 first-class matches as a right-handed batsman who bowled right-arm medium fast. He scored 2,578 runs with a highest score of 131 not out among four centuries and took 300 wickets with a best performance of eight for 77.

Whitehead had an eventful first-class debut against Nottinghamshire in 1908. Going to the wicket when Lancashire's score was 117 for 6 in reply to Nottinghamshire's first innings total of 177, he scored 131 not out, adding 188 in two and a quarter hours for the seventh wicket with his captain, A. N. Hornby. When Nottinghamshire went in again, 175 in arrears, Whitehead was no-balled for throwing four times and was taken out of the attack. Whitehead and Hornby were together at the end of the match, making the winning runs.
