= James Maddison =

English footballer (born 1996)

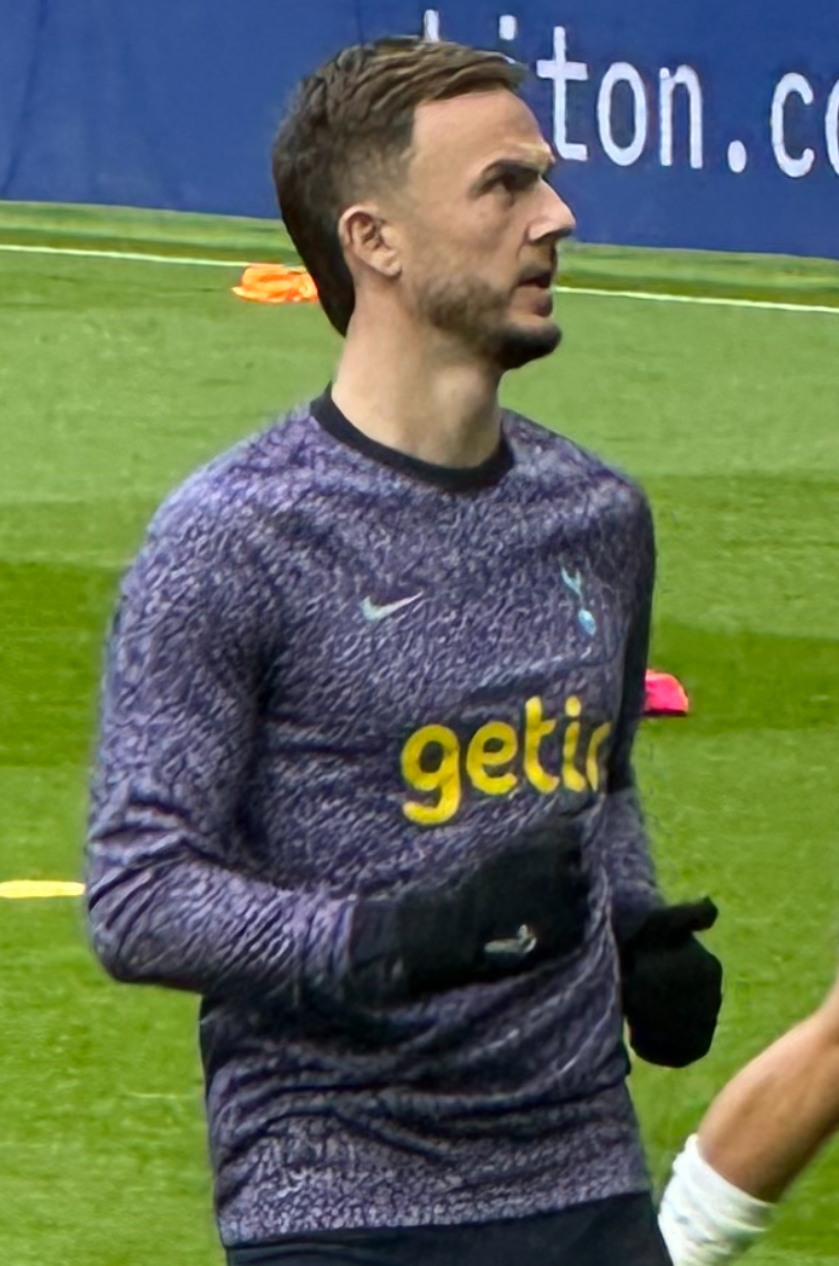
- Maddison warming up for Tottenham Hotspur in 2024

Personal information
- Full name: James Daniel Maddison
- Date of birth: 23 November 1996 (age 29)
- Place of birth: Coventry, England
- Height: 5 ft 9 in (1.75 m)
- Position: Attacking midfielder

Team information
- Current team: Tottenham Hotspur
- Number: 10

Youth career
- –2013: Coventry City

Senior career*
Years	Team	Apps	(Gls)
2013–2016	Coventry City	24	(4)
2016–2018	Norwich City	47	(15)
2016	→ Coventry City (loan)	11	(1)
2016–2017	→ Aberdeen (loan)	14	(2)
2018–2023	Leicester City	163	(43)
2023–	Tottenham Hotspur	67	(14)

International career
2017–2019	England U21	9	(1)
2019–2024	England	7	(0)
- * Club domestic league appearances and goals as of 00:46, 20 October 2026 (UTC)

James Daniel Maddison (born 23 November 1996) is an English professional footballer who plays as an attacking midfielder for Premier League club Tottenham Hotspur.

Maddison began his career with Coventry City before joining Norwich City in 2016. He spent some of the 2016–17 season on loan at Scottish Premiership club Aberdeen. In his first season back at Norwich, Maddison was named in the Championship PFA Team of the Year and EFL Team of the Season. Maddison joined Leicester City in 2018 and won the FA Cup and FA Community Shield with the club in 2021. He signed for Tottenham Hotspur in 2023.

Maddison was capped by England at under-21 level from 2017 to 2019, and made his debut for the senior team in 2019. He was part of the England squad at the 2022 FIFA World Cup.

== Early life ==
James Daniel Maddison was born on 23 November 1996 in Coventry, West Midlands, where he was raised. He has Irish ancestry through a grandparent.

== Club career ==
=== Coventry City ===
Maddison joined Coventry City's youth team, and was included in the first-team squad in the 2013–14 season, though did not make an appearance. He made his first-team debut in August 2014, coming on as a substitute in a 2–1 defeat to Cardiff City in the 2014–15 League Cup. Maddison made his league debut, again as a substitute, in a 3–1 home loss against Bristol City and his first league start in the following game, against Oldham Athletic. He scored his first league goal in the game, with a free kick in the first half, as Coventry lost the game 4–1.

In November 2014, Maddison signed his first professional contract, lasting three and a half years, but missed much of the remainder of the 2014–15 season after being sent off during a Boxing Day defeat to Doncaster Rovers and then picking up a back injury.

=== Norwich City ===
Maddison signed for Premier League club Norwich City on 1 February 2016 on a three-and-a-half-year contract for an undisclosed fee, but was immediately loaned back to Coventry City for the remainder of the 2015–16 season.

Maddison made his debut for Norwich on 23 August 2016 in a 2016–17 EFL Cup tie against his former team Coventry, recording two assists in a 6–1 home win. On 31 August 2016, Maddison was loaned to Scottish Premiership club Aberdeen for the first part of the 2016–17 season. He made his debut as a substitute against Inverness Caledonian Thistle, then started and scored in the next match in a 3–1 win against Dundee. He followed this with a last-minute winner against Rangers on 25 September. He made 17 appearances for Aberdeen, scoring two goals.

After returning from his loan at Aberdeen, Maddison made his first league appearance for Norwich on 17 April 2017 in a 2016–17 Championship match against Preston North End, coming on as a 79th-minute substitute and scoring the team's third goal in the second minute of stoppage time in a 3–1 away win. He signed a new four-year contract with Norwich in June. With the arrival of new coach Daniel Farke, Maddison was given regular starts in the team during the 2017–18 season. He was named as Norwich's Player of the Season at the end of the season, and was nominated for the EFL Championship Young Player of the Season award.

=== Leicester City ===
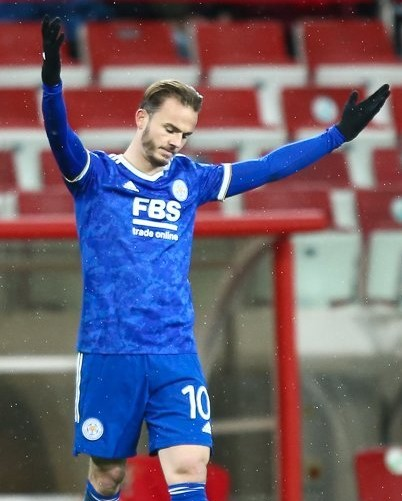
Maddison playing for Leicester City in 2021

Maddison signed for Premier League club Leicester City on 20 June 2018 on a five-year contract for an undisclosed fee thought to be around £20 million. He scored his first goal in the Premier League on 18 August in a 2–0 win against Wolverhampton Wanderers. He later followed up his impressive start for the club with back-to-back Premier League goals, both from set-pieces, against AFC Bournemouth and Huddersfield Town, respectively.

His performances in his debut season saw him awarded Leicester City's Young Player of the Season.

On 29 July 2020, he agreed a new four-year contract with Leicester.

On 27 September 2020, Maddison scored from long range in a 5–2 win against Manchester City, a goal which was later voted as Premier League Goal of the Month.

On 11 April 2021, Maddison was one of three players dropped from Leicester's squad for the game against West Ham United after breaching COVID-19 protocols. On 15 May, he appeared as a substitute in the 67th minute of the 2021 FA Cup Final, as Leicester beat Chelsea 1–0 at Wembley Stadium.

Maddison was named Leicester City's Player of the Season for 2021–22. He top scored for the team with 18 goals in all competitions, in addition to registering 12 assists.

On 11 February 2023, Maddison captained Leicester for the first time in a 4–1 win over Tottenham Hotspur, a match in which he scored his team's second goal and assisted their fourth. He ended the 2022–23 season with ten goals and nine assists in the Premier League as Leicester were relegated to the Championship.

=== Tottenham Hotspur ===
==== 2023–24 ====
On 28 June 2023, Maddison signed for Premier League club Tottenham Hotspur on a five-year contract for an undisclosed fee. The transfer fee was reported to be £40 million. On 12 August, Maddison was appointed as vice-captain alongside Cristian Romero, with Son Heung-min as club captain. Maddison made his debut for Tottenham on 13 August in the team's opening match of the 2023–24 Premier League season, starting in an away match against Brentford. He scored his first goal for the club on 26 August in a 2–0 away win against Bournemouth. Registering one goal and two assists in his first three league matches for Tottenham, Maddison was named the Premier League's Player of the Month for August.

On 6 November 2023, Maddison was forced off with an ankle injury in a home match against Chelsea, which was expected to keep him on the sidelines until 2024. He returned from injury as a substitute in a 1–0 loss to Manchester City in the FA Cup on 26 January 2024. Maddison would struggle for form through the rest of the season, scoring only 1 more goal in Tottenham's 0-4 away win against Aston Villa, as well as providing 4 assists in Tottenham's 17 remaining Premier League matches.

==== 2024–25 ====
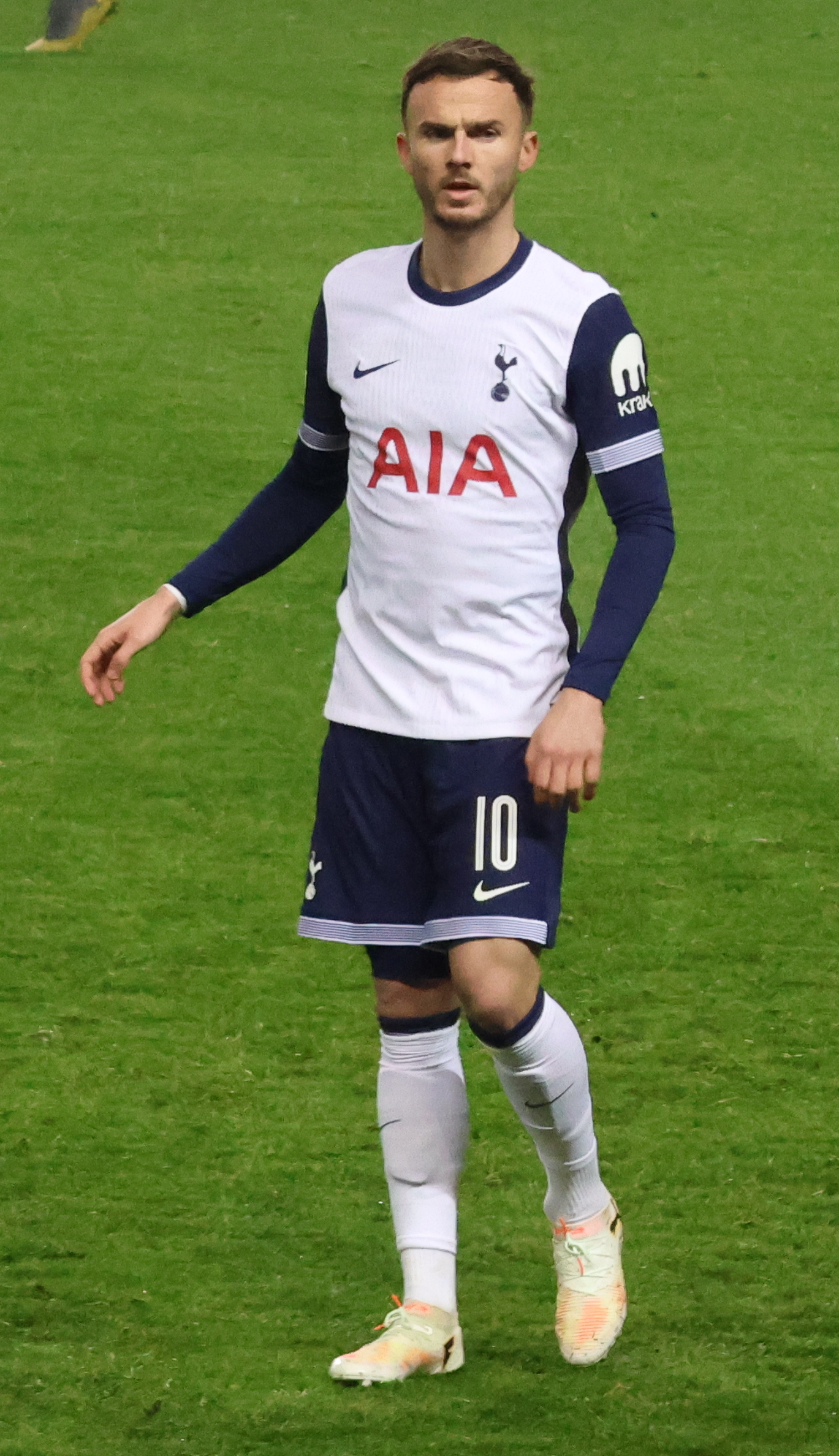
Maddison in an Europa League game against Rangers FC.

Maddison would score his first Premier League goal of the 2024-25 season on 29 September in a 3-1 home win over Brentford, maintaining a period of good form through the first 4 months of the season, including scoring 2 goals in Tottenham's 0-4 away win against Manchester City on his 28th birthday. He would score his first Europa League goal for Tottenham in their 2-3 league phase away win against Hoffenheim on 23 January 2025, also providing an assist for Son Heung-min.

Maddison suffered a calf strain in January 2025 following the Europa League match against Hoffenheim, being out for 3 weeks before returning on 16 February for Tottenham's 1-0 home league win against Manchester United, where he scored the only goal of the match. In April, Maddison would assist Pedro Porro's goal against Eintracht Frankfurt in the first leg of the Europa League quarter-final, as well as win the penalty for Dominic Solanke in the second leg. On 1 May, during the Europa League semi-final first leg against Bodø/Glimt Maddison would score in the 34th minute, though would be substituted for Dejan Kulusevski in the 65th minute. It was confirmed by Tottenham head coach Ange Postecoglou on 4 May that Maddison had suffered a knee injury that would bring an end to his season.

==== 2025–26 ====
Maddison returned for 2025–26 pre-season, but sustained another knee injury during a friendly against Newcastle United. New Spurs head coach, Thomas Frank, described the injury as "bad" and a "brutal moment". It was later revealed that he had suffered an ACL injury, which would sideline him for most of the upcoming season.

Maddison made his return from injury on 11 May 2026, coming on as a substitute in a 1–1 draw against Leeds United.

==== 2026–27 ====
On 19 October 2026, Maddison started in the Premier League for the first time since April 2025, and scored the opening goal in a 3-1 win against Coventry City.

== International career ==
Maddison was included in an England under-21 squad in March 2016, but was unable to play due to injury. He received his first call-up to the England under-21 team in November 2017, and made his debut against Ukraine in a 2019 UEFA European Under-21 Championship qualifier. He received his first call-up to the senior team in October 2018 for the UEFA Nations League matches against Croatia and Spain.

On 27 May 2019, Maddison was included in England's 23-man squad for the 2019 UEFA European Under-21 Championship and scored his first goal for his country during a 3–3 draw with Croatia at the San Marino Stadium on 24 June.

Maddison withdrew from the senior squad in October 2019 due to illness. He was later seen visiting a casino, although his conduct was defended by club manager Brendan Rodgers. Maddison made his debut for England on 14 November when he came on for Alex Oxlade-Chamberlain in the 56th minute of a 7–0 win over Montenegro in UEFA Euro 2020 qualifying.

After a three-year absence, Maddison was named in the 26-man England squad for the 2022 FIFA World Cup in Qatar. However, he did not make an appearance in the tournament. He made his first start for England on 26 March 2023 in a UEFA Euro 2024 qualifier against Ukraine.

Maddison was selected for the provisional 33-man squad for UEFA Euro 2024, however, he was cut from the final 26-man squad. Maddison said the decision was "devastating", while admitting that he "had not been as fit as he had hoped" at the end of the season.

== Personal life ==
Maddison and his partner, Kennedy Alexa, have a son who was born on 31 July 2021. On 2 July 2023, his partner gave birth to fraternal twins, a boy and a girl. On 30 October 2025, his partner gave birth to another set of fraternal twins, also a boy and a girl.

Maddison has been a dedicated supporter of Noah’s Ark Children’s Hospice, participating in their annual celebrity golf day fundraiser. He has also raised funds for various charities, including Tiny Tim’s Children’s Centre, Me and Be Coventry, and Ladybug Lodge, in support of his god-brother Jacob, who has cerebral palsy. Additionally, Maddison showed his solidarity with British-Israeli and Tottenham Hotspur fan Emily Damari who visited the United Kingdom as part of her “Bring Them Home” campaign.

== Career statistics ==
=== Club ===
As of match played 19 October 2026

Appearances and goals by club, season and competition
Club	Season	League			National cup (Note: Includes FA Cup)		League cup (Note: Includes Football League/EFL Cup, Scottish League Cup)		Europe		Other		Total	
Club	Season	Division	Apps	Goals	Apps	Goals	Apps	Goals	Apps	Goals	Apps	Goals	Apps	Goals
Coventry City	2013–14	League One	0	0	0	0	0	0	—		0	0	0	0
Coventry City	2014–15	League One	12	2	1	0	1	0	—		4 (Note: Appearance(s) in Football League/EFL Trophy)	0	18	2
Coventry City	2015–16	League One	23	3	0	0	1	0	—		0	0	24	3
Coventry City	Total		35	5	1	0	2	0	—		4	0	42	5
Norwich City	2016–17	Championship	3	1	0	0	1	0	—		—		4	1
Norwich City	2017–18	Championship	44	14	2	0	3	1	—		—		49	15
Norwich City	Total		47	15	2	0	4	1	—		—		53	16
Norwich City U23	2016–17	—			—		—		—		1	1	1	1
Aberdeen (loan)	2016–17	Scottish Premiership	14	2	—		3	0	—		—		17	2
Leicester City	2018–19	Premier League	36	7	1	0	1	0	—		—		38	7
Leicester City	2019–20	Premier League	31	6	2	0	5	3	—		—		38	9
Leicester City	2020–21	Premier League	31	8	4	1	1	0	6 (Note: Appearances in UEFA Europa League)	2	—		42	11
Leicester City	2021–22	Premier League	35	12	2	1	2	1	13 (Note: Five appearances and one goal in UEFA Europa League, eight appearances and three goals in UEFA Europa Conference League)	4	1 (Note: Appearance in FA Community Shield)	0	53	18
Leicester City	2022–23	Premier League	30	10	1	0	1	0	—		—		32	10
Leicester City	Total		163	43	10	2	10	4	19	6	1	0	203	55
Tottenham Hotspur	2023–24	Premier League	28	4	1	0	1	0	—		—		30	4
Tottenham Hotspur	2024–25	Premier League	31	9	1	0	2	0	11	3	—		45	12
Tottenham Hotspur	2025–26	Premier League	3	0	0	0	0	0	0	0	0	0	3	0
Tottenham Hotspur	2026–27	Premier League	5	1	0	0	1	0	—		—		6	1
Tottenham Hotspur	Total		67	14	2	0	4	0	11	3	0	0	84	17
Career total			326	79	15	2	23	5	30	9	6	1	400	96

=== International ===
Appearances and goals by national team and year
National team	Year	Apps	Goals
England	2019	1	0
England	2023	4	0
England	2024	2	0
Total		7	0

== Honours ==
Leicester City

- FA Cup: 2020–21
- FA Community Shield: 2021

Tottenham Hotspur

- UEFA Europa League: 2024–25

Individual

- EFL Young Player of the Month: January 2018
- EFL Team of the Season: 2017–18
- PFA Team of the Year: 2017–18 Championship
- Norwich City Player of the Season: 2017–18
- Premier League Goal of the Month: September 2020
- Leicester City Player of the Year: 2021–22
- Premier League Player of the Month: August 2023
