= Billy Mills (footballer) =

English professional footballer

Personal information
- Full name: William Mills
- Date of birth: 1891
- Place of birth: Hackney, England
- Height: 5 ft 6 in (1.68 m)
- Position: Inside right

Senior career*
Years	Team	Apps	(Gls)
- Barnet & Alston
–1911	Vicar of Wakefield		
1911–1918	Leicester Fosse	77	(20)
- * Club domestic league appearances and goals

William Mills was an English professional footballer who played as an inside right in the Football League for Leicester Fosse.

== Personal life ==
Mills served on the Western Front with the British Army during the First World War and lost a foot.

== Career statistics ==
Appearances and goals by club, season and competition
Club	Season	League			FA Cup		Total	
Club	Season	Division	Apps	Goals	Apps	Goals	Apps	Goals
Leicester Fosse	1911–12	Second Division	8	2	1	1	9	3
Leicester Fosse	1912–13	Second Division	28	4	0	0	28	4
Leicester Fosse	1913–14	Second Division	12	3	0	0	12	3
Leicester Fosse	1914–15	Second Division	29	11	1	0	30	11
Career total			77	20	2	1	79	21
