= 2021–22 Leicester City F.C. season =

117th season in existence of Leicester City

Leicester City
2021–22 season
- Owner: King Power
- Chairman: Aiyawatt Srivaddhanaprabha
- Manager: Brendan Rodgers
- Stadium: King Power Stadium
- Premier League: 8th
- FA Cup: Fourth round
- EFL Cup: Quarter-finals
- FA Community Shield: Winners
- UEFA Europa League: Group stage
- UEFA Europa Conference League: Semi-finals
- Top goalscorer: League: Jamie Vardy (15); All: James Maddison (18)
Home colours	Away colours	Third colours

The 2021–22 season was the 117th season in the existence of Leicester City F.C. and their 54th (non-consecutive) season in the top tier of English football. This was their eighth consecutive season in the Premier League. In addition to the domestic league, they also competed in this season's editions of the FA Cup, the EFL Cup, the FA Community Shield, the UEFA Europa League, and the UEFA Europa Conference League.

This was Leicester's first season since 2011–12, and first full season since 2010–11, to not feature former club captain Wes Morgan, who retired at the end of the previous campaign.

== Kits ==
Home	Home alt.	Away	Third

Goalkeeper 1	Goalkeeper 2	Goalkeeper 3

== Management team ==
Position	Name
Manager	(Northern Ireland) Brendan Rodgers
Assistant manager	(Wales) Chris Davies
First team coaches	(Ivory Coast) Kolo Toure
First team coaches	(England) Adam Sadler
First team coach & Goalkeeper coach	(England) Mike Stowell

== Players ==
=== Squad information ===
Players and squad numbers last updated on 22 May 2022. Appearances include all competitions.
Note: Flags indicate national team as has been defined under FIFA eligibility rules. Players may hold more than one non-FIFA nationality.

No.	Name	Nat	Position(s)	Date of birth (age)	Signed in	Contract ends	Signed from	Apps.	Goals
Goalkeepers
1	Kasper Schmeichel	(Denmark)	GK	5 November 1986 (age 40)	2011	2023	(England) Leeds United	479	0
12	Danny Ward	(Wales)	GK	22 June 1993 (age 33)	2018	2025	(England) Liverpool	19	0
35	Eldin Jakupovic	(Switzerland)	GK	2 October 1984 (age 42)	2017	2022	(England) Hull City	4	0
Defenders
2	James Justin	(England)	LB / LWB / RB / RWB / CB	23 February 1998 (age 28)	2019	2026	(England) Luton Town	68	4
3	Wesley Fofana	(France)	CB	17 December 2000 (age 25)	2020	2027	(France) Saint-Étienne	50	1
4	Çağlar Söyüncü	(Turkey)	CB	23 May 1996 (age 30)	2018	2023	(Germany) SC Freiburg	123	3
5	Ryan Bertrand	(England)	LB	5 August 1989 (age 37)	2021	2023	(England) Southampton	11	0
6	Jonny Evans	(Northern Ireland)	CB	3 January 1988 (age 38)	2018	2023	(England) West Bromwich Albion	138	7
18	Daniel Amartey	(Ghana)	RB / CB	21 December 1994 (age 31)	2016	2022	(Denmark) Copenhagen	121	3
21	Ricardo Pereira	(Portugal)	RB / RWB	6 October 1993 (age 33)	2018	2026	(Portugal) Porto	113	8
23	Jannik Vestergaard	(Denmark)	CB	3 August 1992 (age 34)	2021	2024	(England) Southampton	20	0
27	Timothy Castagne	(Belgium)	RB / LB / RWB / LWB / CB	5 December 1995 (age 30)	2020	2025	(Italy) Atalanta	70	3
33	Luke Thomas	(England)	LWB / LB	10 June 2001 (age 25)	2020	2024	Youth Academy	61	2
38	Vontae Daley-Campbell	(England)	RB / RWB	2 April 2001 (age 25)	2019	2022	(England) Arsenal	3	0
45	Ben Nelson	(England)	CB	18 March 2004 (age 22)	2021	2022	Youth Academy	0	0
62	Lewis Brunt	(England)	CB	6 November 2000 (age 26)	2021		Aston Villa	2	0
Midfielders
7	Harvey Barnes	(England)	LW	9 December 1997 (age 28)	2016	2025	Youth Academy	147	32
8	Youri Tielemans	(Belgium)	CM	7 May 1997 (age 29)	2019	2023	(France) Monaco	158	24
10	James Maddison	(England)	AM	23 November 1996 (age 29)	2018	2024	(England) Norwich City	171	45
11	Marc Albrighton	(England)	RW / LW / RWB / LWB	18 November 1989 (age 36)	2015	2024	(England) Aston Villa	284	18
20	Hamza Choudhury	(England)	DM	1 October 1997 (age 29)	2015	2023	Youth Academy	84	2
22	Kiernan Dewsbury-Hall	(England)	CM	6 September 1998 (age 28)	2017	2024	Youth Academy	46	3
24	Nampalys Mendy	(Senegal)	DM	23 June 1992 (age 34)	2016	2023	(France) Nice	94	0
25	Wilfred Ndidi	(Nigeria)	DM	16 December 1996 (age 29)	2017	2024	(Belgium) Genk	207	11
26	Dennis Praet	(Belgium)	CM	14 May 1994 (age 32)	2019	2023	(Italy) Sampdoria	60	3
37	Ademola Lookman	(Nigeria)	LW / RW	20 October 1997 (age 29)	2021	2022 (loan)	(Germany) RB Leipzig	42	7
42	Boubakary Soumaré	(France)	DM	27 February 1999 (age 27)	2021	2026	(France) Lille	30	0
48	Thanawat Suengchitthawon	(Thailand)	AM	8 January 2000 (age 26)	2020	2023	(France) Nancy	0	0
49	Kasey McAteer	(England)	AM	22 November 2001 (age 24)	2020		Youth Academy	2	0
54	Wanya Marcal-Madivadua	(Portugal)	AM	19 October 2002 (age 24)	2019		Youth Academy	1	0
77	Will Alves	(England)	AM	4 May 2005 (age 21)	2018		Youth Academy	1	0
Attackers
9	Jamie Vardy	(England)	ST	11 January 1987 (age 39)	2012	2023	(England) Fleetwood Town	385	164
14	Kelechi Iheanacho	(Nigeria)	ST	3 October 1996 (age 30)	2017	2024	(England) Manchester City	171	47
17	Ayoze Pérez	(Spain)	SS / RW / AM	29 July 1993 (age 33)	2019	2023	(England) Newcastle United	101	14
29	Patson Daka	(Zambia)	ST	9 October 1998 (age 28)	2021	2026	(Austria) Red Bull Salzburg	38	11

== Transfers ==
=== In ===
Date	Position	Nationality	Name	From	Fee	Team	Ref.
30 June 2021	CF	(Zambia)	Patson Daka	(Austria) Red Bull Salzburg	£23,000,000	First Team	
1 July 2021	RB	(Wales)	Iestyn Hughes	(England) Manchester United	Free transfer	Under-23s	
2 July 2021	DM	(France)	Boubakary Soumaré	(France) Lille	£17,000,000	First Team	
6 July 2021	GK	(England)	Brad Young	(England) Hartlepool United	Undisclosed	Under-23s	
15 July 2021	LB	(England)	Ryan Bertrand	(England) Southampton	Free transfer	First Team	
30 July 2021	CM	(England)	Ben Grist	(England) Grimsby Town	Undisclosed	Under-18s	
1 August 2021	CM	(England)	Lewis Brunt	(England) Aston Villa	Free transfer	Under-23s	
13 August 2021	CB	(Denmark)	Jannik Vestergaard	(England) Southampton	£15,000,000	First Team	
31 January 2022	FW	(England)	Amani Richards	(England) Arsenal	Undisclosed	Under-23s	

=== Out ===
Date	Position	Nationality	Name	To	Fee	Team	Ref.
21 May 2021	CB	(Jamaica)	Wes Morgan	Retired		First team	
30 June 2021	MF	(England)	Azeem Abdulai	(Wales) Swansea City	Released	Academy	
30 June 2021	MF	(England)	Dempsey Arlott-John	(England) Mickleover	Released	Under-23s	
30 June 2021	GK	(England)	Oliver Bosworth	Unattached	Released	Academy	
30 June 2021	CB	(Republic of Ireland)	Darragh O'Connor	(Scotland) Motherwell	Released	Under-23s	
30 June 2021	LB	(Austria)	Christian Fuchs	(United States) Charlotte FC	Released	First Team	
30 June 2021	RW	(England)	Johnson Gyamfi	(England) Peterborough United	Released	Academy	
30 June 2021	CM	(England)	Matty James	(England) Bristol City	Released	First Team	
30 June 2021	DF	(England)	Darnell Johnson	(England) Fleetwood Town	Released	Under-23s	
30 June 2021	MF	(England)	Adam Leathers	(England) Wycombe Wanderers	Released	Under-23s	
30 June 2021	LW	(England)	Layton Ndukwu	(Albania) Kukësi	Released	Under-23s	
30 June 2021	DF	(Nigeria)	Daniel Obi	(England) Dagenham & Redbridge	Released	Academy	
30 June 2021	DF	(England)	Johnly Yfeko	(Scotland) Rangers	Released	Academy	
2 July 2021	CB	(England)	Josh Knight	(England) Peterborough United	Undisclosed	Under-23s	
5 July 2021	MF	(Poland)	Viktor Gromek	(England) Burnley	Free transfer	Academy	
5 July 2021	DF	(Thailand)	Nathan James	(England) Burnley	Free transfer	Academy	
15 July 2021	FW	(Zimbabwe)	Admiral Muskwe	(England) Luton Town	Undisclosed	Under-23s	
12 August 2021	FW	(Algeria)	Rachid Ghezzal	(Turkey) Beşiktaş	Undisclosed	First team	
26 August 2021	RB	(Wales)	Mitch Clark	(England) Accrington Stanley	Free transfer	Under-23s	
27 August 2021	MF	(Ghana)	Kamal Sowah	(Belgium) Club Brugge	Undisclosed	Under-23s	
1 September 2021	CM	(Portugal)	Sidnei Tavares	(Portugal) FC Porto	Free transfer	Under-23s	
12 January 2022	CB	(Croatia)	Filip Benković	(Italy) Udinese	Mutual consent	First team	
31 January 2022	CB	(England)	Sam Hughes	(England) Burton Albion	Undisclosed	Under-23s	
31 January 2022	CF	(Algeria)	Ali Reghba	(Algeria) Belouizdad	Undisclosed	Under-23s	

=== Loan in ===
Date	Position	Nationality	Name	From	Date until	Ref.
31 August 2021	FW	(Nigeria)	Ademola Lookman	(Germany) RB Leipzig	End of season	

=== Loan out ===
Date	Position	Nationality	Name	To	Date until	Team	Ref.
3 August 2021	MF	(Saint Kitts and Nevis)	Tyrese Shade	(England) Walsall	End of season	Under-23s	
3 August 2021	CF	(England)	George Hirst	(England) Portsmouth	End of season	Under-23s	
4 August 2021	GK	(Denmark)	Daniel Iversen	(England) Preston North End	End of season	Under-23s	
5 August 2021	CM	(England)	Callum Wright	(England) Cheltenham Town	End of season	Under-23s	
19 August 2021	MF	(South Africa)	Khanya Leshabela	(England) Shrewsbury Town	End of season	Under-23s	
31 August 2021	CB	(England)	Sam Hughes	(England) Burton Albion	January 2022	Under-23s	
31 August 2021	MF	(Belgium)	Dennis Praet	(Italy) Torino	End of season	First team	
26 November 2021	GK	(England)	Arlo Doherty	(England) Mickleover		Under-23s	
12 January 2022	CF	(England)	Jacob Wakeling	(England) Barrow	End of season	Under-23s	
28 January 2022	CF	(Belgium)	Josh Eppiah	(England) Northampton Town	End of season	Under-23s	
28 January 2022	AM	(England)	Kasey McAteer	(England) Forest Green Rovers	End of season	Under-23s	
31 January 2022	RB	(England)	Vontae Daley-Campbell	(Scotland) Dundee	End of season	Under-23s	
31 January 2022	GK	(Poland)	Jakub Stolarczyk	(Scotland) Dunfermline Athletic	End of season	Under-23s	

== Pre-season friendlies ==
The Foxes announced they would have friendly matches against Burton Albion, Wycombe Wanderers, Queens Park Rangers and Villarreal as part of the club's pre-season preparations.

24 July 2021 Friendly	Burton Albion	0–0 (3–1 p)	Leicester City	Burton-upon-Trent
15:00 BST		Report		Stadium: Pirelli Stadium
	Penalties
	Powell (penalty scored); Patrick (penalty missed); Blake-Tracy (penalty scored); Morris (penalty scored)		(penalty missed) Suengchitthawon; (penalty missed) Thomas; (penalty missed) Iheanacho; (penalty scored) Dewsbury-Hall
Note: Match decided the winner of the 2021 Bass Charity Vase competition.

28 July 2021 Friendly	Wycombe Wanderers	1–0	Leicester City	High Wycombe
19:45 BST	Horgan 80'	Report		Stadium: Adams Park

31 July 2021 Friendly	Queens Park Rangers	3–3	Leicester City	Shepherd's Bush
15:00 BST	Austin 45'; Barbet 55'; Dickie 82'	Report	Dewsbury-Hall 75'; Daka 77'; Iheanacho 89' (pen.)	Stadium: Kiyan Prince Foundation Stadium

4 August 2021 Friendly	Leicester City	3–2	Villarreal	Leicester
19:45 BST	Söyüncü 40'; Barnes 42'; Pérez 51'	Report	Niño 76'; Millán 83'	Stadium: King Power Stadium; Referee: Matt Donohue

== Competitions ==
=== Overview ===
Competition	First match	Last match	Starting round	Final position	Record							
Competition	First match	Last match	Starting round	Final position	Pld	W	D	L	GF	GA	GD	Win %
Premier League	14 August 2021	22 May 2022	Matchday 1	8th	38	14	10	14	62	59	+3	36.84
FA Cup	8 January 2022	6 February 2022	Third round	Fourth round	2	1	0	1	5	5	+0	50.00
EFL Cup	22 September 2021	22 December 2021	Third round	Quarter-finals	3	1	2	0	7	5	+2	33.33
FA Community Shield	7 August 2021		Final	Winners	1	1	0	0	1	0	+1	100.00
UEFA Europa League	16 September 2021	9 December 2021	Group stage	Group stage	6	2	2	2	12	11	+1	33.33
UEFA Europa Conference League	17 February 2022	5 May 2022	Knockout round play-offs	Semi-finals	8	4	2	2	13	7	+6	50.00
Total					58	23	16	19	100	87	+13	39.66

Source: Soccerway

=== Premier League ===
==== League table ====
Pos	Team	Pld	W	D	L	GF	GA	GD	Pts	Qualification or relegation
6	Manchester United	38	16	10	12	57	57	0	58	Qualification for the Europa League group stage (Note: Since the winners of the 2021–22 FA Cup and the 2021–22 EFL Cup, Liverpool, qualified for the Champions League, the spot given to the FA Cup winners (Europa League group stage) was passed to the sixth-placed team and the spot given to the League Cup winners (Europa Conference League play-off round) was passed to the seventh-placed team.)
7	West Ham United	38	16	8	14	60	51	+9	56	Qualification for the Europa Conference League play-off round
8	Leicester City	38	14	10	14	62	59	+3	52	
9	Brighton & Hove Albion	38	12	15	11	42	44	−2	51	
10	Wolverhampton Wanderers	38	15	6	17	38	43	−5	51	

Source: Premier League
Rules for classification: 1) Points; 2) Goal difference; 3) Goals scored; 4) If the champions, relegated teams or qualified teams for UEFA competitions cannot be determined by rules 1 to 3, rules 4.1 to 4.3 are applied – 4.1) Points gained in head-to-head record between such teams; 4.2) Away goals scored in head-to-head record between such teams; 4.3) Play-offs

==== Results summary ====
Overall								Home						Away					
Pld	W	D	L	GF	GA	GD	Pts	W	D	L	GF	GA	GD	W	D	L	GF	GA	GD
38	14	10	14	62	59	+3	52	10	4	5	34	23	+11	4	6	9	28	36	−8

==== Results by matchday ====
Matchday	1	2	3	4	5	6	7	8	9	10	11	12	13	14	15	16	17	18	19	20	21	22	23	24	25	26	27	28	29	30	31	32	33	34	35	36	37	38
Ground	H	A	A	H	A	H	A	H	A	H	A	H	H	A	A	H	A	H	H	H	A	H	A	A	H	A	H	A	H	A	A	H	A	H	H	A	A	H
Result	W	L	W	L	L	D	D	W	W	L	D	L	W	D	L	W	L	W	L	D	L	D	L	W	W	L	W	D	W	L	D	D	L	L	W	W	D	W
Position	9	12	9	9	12	13	13	11	9	11	12	12	10	10	11	8	10	9	10	10	12	11	11	12	12	12	10	10	9	9	9	10	11	14	10	9	9	8

Source: Statto.com
A = Away; H = Home; W = Win; D = Draw; L = Loss

==== Matches ====
The league fixtures were announced on 16 June 2021.

14 August 2021 1	Leicester City	1–0	Wolverhampton Wanderers	Leicester
15:00 BST	Vardy 41', (yellow card) 90+1'	Report	Marçal (yellow card) 59'; Hoever (yellow card) 76'	Stadium: King Power Stadium; Attendance: 31,983; Referee: Craig Pawson

23 August 2021 2	West Ham United	4–1	Leicester City	Stratford
20:00 BST	Fornals 26'; Benrahma 56'; Antonio 80', 84'	Report	Pérez (red card) 40'; Tielemans 69'; Pereira (yellow card) 71'	Stadium: London Stadium; Attendance: 59,901; Referee: Michael Oliver
Note: Live on Sky Sports

28 August 2021 3	Norwich City	1–2	Leicester City	Norwich
15:00 BST	Lees-Melou (yellow card) 25'; Pukki 44' (pen.); Cantwell (yellow card) 82'	Report	Vardy 8'; Albrighton (yellow card) 69', (goal) 76'	Stadium: Carrow Road; Attendance: 26,765; Referee: Robert Jones

11 September 2021 4	Leicester City	0–1	Manchester City	Leicester
15:00 BST	Söyüncü (yellow card) 75'	Report	Rodri (yellow card) 26'; Laporte (yellow card) 38'; Silva 62'	Stadium: King Power Stadium; Attendance: 32,087; Referee: Paul Tierney

19 September 2021 5	Brighton & Hove Albion	2–1	Leicester City	Falmer
14:00 BST	Veltman (yellow card) 20'; Maupay 35' (pen.); Welbeck 50'; Sánchez (yellow card) 90+4'	Report	Ndidi (yellow card) 44'; Vardy 61'	Stadium: Falmer Stadium; Attendance: 31,078; Referee: Stuart Attwell

25 September 2021 6	Leicester City	2–2	Burnley	Leicester
15:00 BST	Vestergaard (yellow card) 5'; Vardy 37', 85'; Barnes (yellow card) 77'	Report	Vardy 12' (o.g.); Cornet 40', (yellow card) 45+1'; Westwood (yellow card) 60'; Guðmundsson (yellow card) 69'; Tarkowski (yellow card) 90'	Stadium: King Power Stadium; Attendance: 31,650; Referee: Chris Kavanagh

3 October 2021 7	Crystal Palace	2–2	Leicester City	Selhurst
14:00 BST	Olise 61'; Schlupp 72'; Andersen (yellow card) 78'; McArthur (yellow card) 83'	Report	Bertrand (yellow card) 29'; Iheanacho 31'; Vardy 37'; Tielemans (yellow card) 46'; Barnes (yellow card) 90+4'	Stadium: Selhurst Park; Referee: Anthony Taylor
Note: Live on Sky Sports

16 October 2021 8	Leicester City	4–2	Manchester United	Leicester
15:00 BST	Tielemans 31'; Söyüncü 78'; Vardy 83'; Daka 90+1'	Report	Greenwood 19'; Lindelöf (yellow card) 52'; Rashford 82'; Wan-Bissaka (yellow card) 85'; Pogba (yellow card) 86'	Stadium: King Power Stadium; Attendance: 32,219; Referee: Craig Pawson

24 October 2021 9	Brentford	1–2	Leicester City	Brentford
14:00 BST	Zanka (yellow card) 30', (goal) 60'	Report	Tielemans 14'; Söyüncü (yellow card) 63'; Maddison 73'	Stadium: Brentford Community Stadium; Attendance: 16,814; Referee: Simon Hooper

30 October 2021 10	Leicester City	0–2	Arsenal	Leicester
12:30 BST	Evans (yellow card) 68'; Vardy (yellow card) 75'	Report	Gabriel 5'; Smith Rowe 18'	Stadium: King Power Stadium; Attendance: 32,209; Referee: Michael Oliver
Note: Live on BT Sport

7 November 2021 11	Leeds United	1–1	Leicester City	Leeds
14:00 GMT	Raphinha 26', (yellow card) 27'	Report	Barnes 28'; Ndidi (yellow card) 74'	Stadium: Elland Road; Attendance: 36,478; Referee: Darren England

20 November 2021 12	Leicester City	0–3	Chelsea	Leicester
12:30 GMT	Amartey (yellow card) 40'; Evans (yellow card) 45'; Schmeichel (yellow card) 45'	Report	Rüdiger 14'; Kanté 28'; Mendy (yellow card) 65'; Pulisic 71'	Stadium: King Power Stadium; Attendance: 32,192; Referee: Paul Tierney
Note: Live on BT Sport

28 November 2021 13	Leicester City	4–2	Watford	Leicester
14:00 GMT	Maddison 16'; Vardy 34', 42'; Lookman 68'	Report	King 30' (pen.); Dennis 61'	Stadium: King Power Stadium; Attendance: 32,020; Referee: Andrew Madley

1 December 2021 14	Southampton	2–2	Leicester City	Southampton
19:30 GMT	Bednarek 3'; Adams 34'; Romeu (yellow card) 48'	Report	Evans 22'; Maddison 49'; Lookman (yellow card) 55'; Ndidi (yellow card) 82'; Dewsbury-Hall (yellow card) 90+3'	Stadium: St Mary's Stadium; Attendance: 26,951; Referee: Robert Jones

5 December 2021 15	Aston Villa	2–1	Leicester City	Aston
16:30 GMT	Konsa 17', 54'; Nakamba (yellow card) 55'	Report	Barnes 14'; Maddison (yellow card) 90'	Stadium: Villa Park; Attendance: 41,572; Referee: Michael Oliver
Note: Live on Sky Sports

12 December 2021 16	Leicester City	4–0	Newcastle United	Leicester
14:00 GMT	Castagne (yellow card) 11'; Tielemans 38' (pen.), 81'; Daka 57'; Söyüncü (yellow card) 64'; Maddison 85'	Report	Lewis (yellow card) 24'; Manquillo (yellow card) 70'; Saint-Maximin (yellow card) 90'	Stadium: King Power Stadium; Attendance: 31,959; Referee: Peter Bankes

26 December 2021 17	Manchester City	6–3	Leicester City	Manchester
15:00 GMT	De Bruyne 5'; Mahrez 14' (pen.); Gündoğan 21'; Sterling 25' (pen.), 87'; Laporte 69'; Fernandinho (yellow card) 90+1'	Report	Vestergaard (yellow card) 45'; Maddison 55', (yellow card) 75'; Lookman 59'; Iheanacho 65'	Stadium: City of Manchester Stadium; Attendance: 53,226; Referee: Chris Kavanagh

28 December 2021 18	Leicester City	1–0	Liverpool	Leicester
20:00 GMT	Lookman 59'	Report	Matip (yellow card) 4'	Stadium: King Power Stadium; Attendance: 32,230; Referee: Michael Oliver

19 January 2022 19	Leicester City	2–3	Tottenham Hotspur	Leicester
19:30 GMT	Daka 24'; Choudhury (yellow card) 55'; Maddison 76'	Report	Kane 38'; Sánchez (yellow card) 59'; Bergwijn (yellow card) 90+4', (goal) 90+5', 90+7'	Stadium: King Power Stadium; Attendance: 31,986; Referee: Jonathan Moss
Note: Live on BT Sport. The match was originally scheduled for 16 December 2021, but was postponed due to a COVID-19 outbreak in Leicester City's squad.

23 January 2022 20	Leicester City	1–1	Brighton & Hove Albion	Leicester
14:00 GMT	Daka 46'	Report	Burn (yellow card) 67'; Welbeck 82'	Stadium: King Power Stadium; Attendance: 31,231; Referee: Martin Atkinson

10 February 2022 21	Liverpool	2–0	Leicester City	Liverpool
19:45 GMT	Jota 34', 87'; Firmino (yellow card) 50'	Report		Stadium: Anfield; Attendance: 53,050; Referee: Chris Kavanagh
Note: Live on BT Sport

13 February 2022 22	Leicester City	2–2	West Ham United	Leicester
16:30 GMT	Pereira (yellow card) 18', (goal) 57'; Tielemans 45' (pen.)	Report	Bowen 10'; Cresswell (yellow card) 60'; Rice (yellow card) 61'; Dawson 90+1'	Stadium: King Power Stadium; Attendance: 32,061; Referee: Michael Oliver
Note: Live on Sky Sports

20 February 2022 23	Wolverhampton Wanderers	2–1	Leicester City	Wolverhampton
16:30 GMT	Neves 9', (yellow card) 76'; Aït-Nouri (yellow card) 31'; Podence (yellow card) 38', (goal) 67'; Dendoncker (yellow card) 70'	Report	Söyüncü (yellow card) 29'; Albrighton (yellow card) 36'; Lookman (yellow card) 38', (goal) 41'; Pereira (yellow card) 90+2'	Stadium: Molineux; Attendance: 31,497; Referee: Craig Pawson
Note: Live on Sky Sports

1 March 2022 24	Burnley	0–2	Leicester City	Burnley
19:45 GMT	Weghorst (yellow card) 57'	Report	Maddison 82'; Vardy 90'; Dewsbury-Hall (yellow card) 90+1'	Stadium: Turf Moor; Attendance: 17,825; Referee: Chris Kavanagh

5 March 2022 25	Leicester City	1–0	Leeds United	Leicester
12:30 GMT	Ndidi (yellow card) 53'; Barnes 67'	Report	Struijk (yellow card) 9'; Forshaw (yellow card) 71'	Stadium: King Power Stadium; Attendance: 32,236; Referee: David Coote
Note: Live on BT Sport

13 March 2022 26	Arsenal	2–0	Leicester City	Holloway
16:30 GMT	Partey 11'; Lacazette 59' (pen.)	Report	Iheanacho (yellow card) 30'; Söyüncü (yellow card) 58'; Daka (yellow card) 80'	Stadium: Emirates Stadium; Attendance: 60,111; Referee: Anthony Taylor
Note: Live on Sky Sports

20 March 2022 27	Leicester City	2–1	Brentford	Leicester
14:00 GMT	Castagne 20'; Maddison 33'; Dewsbury-Hall (yellow card) 76'	Report	Pinnock (yellow card) 83'; Wissa 85'; Nørgaard (yellow card) 90'	Stadium: King Power Stadium; Attendance: 31,830; Referee: Darren England

2 April 2022 28	Manchester United	1–1	Leicester City	Manchester
17:30 BST	Shaw (yellow card) 5'; McTominay (yellow card) 49'; Fred 66'	Report	Fofana (yellow card) 16'; Tielemans (yellow card) 30'; Iheanacho 63'	Stadium: Old Trafford; Attendance: 73,444; Referee: Andre Marriner

10 April 2022 29	Leicester City	2–1	Crystal Palace	Leicester
14:00 BST	Lookman 39'; Dewsbury-Hall 45'; Thomas (yellow card) 67'	Report	Mitchell (yellow card) 32'; Zaha 66'	Stadium: King Power Stadium; Attendance: 31,896; Referee: Robert Jones

17 April 2022 30	Newcastle United	2–1	Leicester City	Newcastle upon Tyne
14:15 BST	Bruno Guimarães 30', 90+5', (yellow card) 90+6'; Krafth (yellow card) 84'	Report	Amartey (yellow card) 1'; Lookman 19'; Mendy (yellow card) 90+6'	Stadium: St James' Park; Attendance: 52,104; Referee: Jarred Gillett

20 April 2022 31	Everton	1–1	Leicester City	Liverpool
19:45 BST	Richarlison (yellow card) 75', (goal) 90+2'; Mina (yellow card) 80'; Alli (yellow card) 86'; Rondón (yellow card) 90+3'	Report	Barnes 5'; Schmeichel (yellow card) 90+3'; Daka (yellow card) 90+4'	Stadium: Goodison Park; Attendance: 39,153; Referee: David Coote
Note: The match was originally scheduled for 19 December 2021 but was postponed due to a COVID-19 outbreak in Leicester's squad.

23 April 2022 32	Leicester City	0–0	Aston Villa	Leicester
15:00 BST	Mendy (yellow card) 64'; Dewsbury-Hall (yellow card) 65'; Maddison (yellow card) 75'	Report	Douglas Luiz (yellow card) 72'; Bailey (yellow card) 90+5'	Stadium: King Power Stadium; Attendance: 32,185; Referee: Andrew Madley

1 May 2022 33	Tottenham Hotspur	3–1	Leicester City	Tottenham
14:00 BST	Kane 22'; Davies (yellow card) 26'; Bentancur (yellow card) 58'; Son 60', 79'	Report	Albrighton (yellow card) 48'; Amartey (yellow card) 63'; Thomas (yellow card) 66'; Iheanacho 90+1'	Stadium: Tottenham Hotspur Stadium; Attendance: 59,482; Referee: Jonathan Moss

8 May 2022 34	Leicester City	1–2	Everton	Leicester
14:00 BST	Daka 11'; Mendy (yellow card) 47'; Amartey (yellow card) 88'; Fofana (yellow card) 90+3'	Report	Mykolenko 6'; Holgate 30'	Stadium: King Power Stadium; Attendance: 32,001; Referee: Craig Pawson

11 May 2022 35	Leicester City	3–0	Norwich City	Leicester
19:45 BST	Vardy 54', 62'; Maddison 70'	Report		Stadium: King Power Stadium; Attendance: 30,892; Referee: Simon Hooper
Note: The match was originally scheduled for 1 January 2022 but was postponed due to COVID-19 infections and injuries in Norwich's squad.

15 May 2022 36	Watford	1–5	Leicester City	Watford
14:00 BST	João Pedro 6'	Report	Maddison 18'; Vardy 22', 70'; Barnes 46', 86'; Tielemans (yellow card) 55'	Stadium: Vicarage Road; Attendance: 20,257; Referee: Jarred Gillett

19 May 2022 37	Chelsea	1–1	Leicester City	Fulham
20:00 BST	Alonso 34'; Kanté (yellow card) 47'; Lukaku (yellow card) 59'; Rüdiger (yellow card) 66'; Jorginho (yellow card) 85'	Report	Maddison 6'; Evans (yellow card) 64'	Stadium: Stamford Bridge; Attendance: 31,478; Referee: Stuart Attwell

22 May 2022 38	Leicester City	4–1	Southampton	Leicester
16:00 BST	Maddison 49'; Vardy 74'; Pérez 81', 90+6'	Report	Romeu (yellow card) 70'; Ward-Prowse 79' (pen.)	Stadium: King Power Stadium; Attendance: 32,003; Referee: Jonathan Moss

=== FA Cup ===
Leicester City entered the competition at the third round stage and on 6 December 2021 were drawn at home to Watford.

8 January 2022 Third round	Leicester City	4–1	Watford	Leicester
15:00 GMT	Tielemans 7' (pen.); Maddison 25'; Daley-Campbell (yellow card) 36'; Barnes 54'; Albrighton 85'	Report	João Pedro 27'	Stadium: King Power Stadium; Attendance: 25,710; Referee: Mike Dean

6 February 2022 Fourth round	Nottingham Forest	4–1	Leicester City	West Bridgford
16:00 GMT	Zinckernagel 23'; Johnson 24'; Worrall 32'; Spence 61'; Garner (yellow card) 66'	Report	Iheanacho 40'; Ndidi (yellow card) 59'; Maddison (yellow card) 74'	Stadium: City Ground; Attendance: 28,762; Referee: Paul Tierney
Note: Live on BBC One

=== EFL Cup ===
Leicester City entered the competition in the third round due to participation in UEFA competitions and were drawn away to Millwall and then at home to Brighton & Hove Albion in the fourth round.

22 September 2021 Third round	Millwall	0–2	Leicester City	Bermondsey
19:45 BST		Report	Lookman 50'; Iheanacho 88'	Stadium: The Den; Attendance: 9,985; Referee: Andrew Madley

27 October 2021 Fourth round	Leicester City	2–2 (4–2 p)	Brighton & Hove Albion	Leicester
19:45 BST	Barnes 6'; Lookman 45+5'; Mendy (yellow card) 77'; Iheanacho (yellow card) 89'	Report	Webster 45+3'; Mwepu 71'	Stadium: King Power Stadium; Attendance: 21,163; Referee: Jarred Gillett
	Penalties
	Maddison (penalty scored); Barnes (penalty scored); Daka (penalty scored); Pereira (penalty scored)		(penalty scored) Groß; (penalty missed) Maupay; (penalty scored) Mac Allister; (penalty missed) Mwepu

22 December 2021 Quarter-finals	Liverpool	3–3 (5–4 p)	Leicester City	Liverpool
19:45 GMT	Morton (yellow card) 10'; Oxlade-Chamberlain 19'; Jota 68'; Minamino 90+5'	Report	Vardy 9', 13'; Maddison 33', (yellow card) 74'; Thomas (yellow card) 89'	Stadium: Anfield; Attendance: 52,020; Referee: Andrew Madley
	Penalties
	Milner (penalty scored); Firmino (penalty scored); Oxlade-Chamberlain (penalty scored); Keïta (penalty scored); Minamino (penalty missed); Jota (penalty scored)		(penalty scored) Tielemans; (penalty scored) Maddison; (penalty scored) Albrighton; (penalty missed) Thomas; (penalty scored) Iheanacho; (penalty missed) Bertrand

=== FA Community Shield ===
7 August 2021 Community Shield	Leicester City	1–0	Manchester City	Wembley
17:15 BST	Bertrand (yellow card) 50'; Iheanacho 89' (pen.)	Report	Dias (yellow card) 87'; Fernandinho (yellow card) 88'	Stadium: Wembley Stadium; Attendance: 45,602; Referee: Paul Tierney
Note: Live on ITV

=== UEFA Europa League ===
==== Group stage ====
Leicester City were drawn against Italian side Napoli, Russian side Spartak Moscow and Polish side Legia Warsaw in the group stages.

Pos	Team	Pld	W	D	L	GF	GA	GD	Pts	Qualification	SPM	NAP	LEI	LEG
1	(Russia) Spartak Moscow	6	3	1	2	10	9	+1	10 (Note: Head–to–head points: Spartak Moscow 6, Napoli 0.)	Advance to round of 16	—	2–1	3–4	0–1
2	(Italy) Napoli	6	3	1	2	15	10	+5	10	Advance to knockout round play-offs	2–3	—	3–2	3–0
3	(England) Leicester City	6	2	2	2	12	11	+1	8	Transfer to Europa Conference League	1–1	2–2	—	3–1
4	(Poland) Legia Warsaw	6	2	0	4	4	11	−7	6		0–1	1–4	1–0	—

Source: UEFA
Rules for classification: Group stage tiebreakers
Notes:

16 September 2021 1	Leicester City (England)	2–2	(Italy) Napoli	Leicester, England
20:00 BST (UTC+1)	Pérez 9'; Ndidi (yellow card) 21' (yellow-red card) 90+3'; Soumaré (yellow card) 32'; Vestergaard (yellow card) 53'; Barnes 64'; Söyüncü (yellow card) 76'	Report	Di Lorenzo (yellow card) 34'; Osimhen 69', 87'; Rrahmani (yellow card) 90+5'	Stadium: King Power Stadium; Attendance: 29,579; Referee: Tiago Martins (Portugal)
Note: Live on BT Sport

30 September 2021 2	Legia Warsaw (Poland)	1–0	(England) Leicester City	Warsaw, Poland
18:45 CEST (UTC+2)	Emreli 31', (yellow card) 84'; Josué (yellow card) 52'; Pekhart (yellow card) 88'; Mladenović (yellow card) 90+5'	Report	Thomas (yellow card) 21'; Maddison (yellow card) 84'	Stadium: Stadion Wojska Polskiego; Attendance: 27,087; Referee: Ivan Bebek (Croatia)
Note: Live on BT Sport

20 October 2021 3	Spartak Moscow (Russia)	3–4	(England) Leicester City	Moscow, Russia
17:30 MSK (UTC+3)	Sobolev 11', 86'; Litvinov (yellow card) 33'; Larsson 44'; Lomovitsky (yellow card) 90+5'	Report	Pereira (yellow card) 30'; Daka 45', 48', 54', 79'; Soumaré (yellow card) 89'	Stadium: Otkritie Arena; Attendance: 11,366; Referee: Anastasios Sidiropoulos (Greece)
Note: Live on BT Sport

4 November 2021 4	Leicester City (England)	1–1	(Russia) Spartak Moscow	Leicester, England
20:00 GMT (UTC±0)	Amartey 58'; Tielemans (yellow card) 67'	Report	Moses 51', (yellow card) 74'; Sobolev (yellow card) 59'	Stadium: King Power Stadium; Attendance: 30,222; Referee: Halil Umut Meler (Turkey)
Note: Live on BT Sport

25 November 2021 5	Leicester City (England)	3–1	(Poland) Legia Warsaw	Leicester, England
20:00 GMT (UTC±0)	Daka 11'; Maddison 21'; Ndidi 33'; Thomas (yellow card) 61'; Albrighton (yellow card) 89'	Report	Mladenović 26', (yellow card) 39'; Wieteska (yellow card) 48'; Jędrzejczyk (yellow card) 87'	Stadium: King Power Stadium; Attendance: 30,658; Referee: Deniz Aytekin (Germany)
Note: Live on BT Sport

9 December 2021 6	Napoli (Italy)	3–2	(England) Leicester City	Naples, Italy
18:45 CET (UTC+1)	Ounas 4'; Elmas 24', 53'; Petagna (yellow card) 33'; Demme (yellow card) 77'	Report	Evans 27'; Dewsbury-Hall 33'	Stadium: Stadio Diego Armando Maradona; Attendance: 14,646; Referee: Antonio Mateu Lahoz (Spain)
Note: Live on BT Sport

=== UEFA Europa Conference League ===
==== Knockout phase ====
===== Knockout round play-offs =====
The knockout round play-offs draw was held on 13 December 2021.

17 February 2022 First leg	Leicester City (England)	4–1	(Denmark) Randers	Leicester, England
20:00 GMT (UTC±0)	Ndidi 23'; Barnes 49'; Daka 54'; Dewsbury-Hall 74'	Report	Hammershøy-Mistrati 45'	Stadium: King Power Stadium; Attendance: 25,242; Referee: Radu Petrescu (Romania)

24 February 2022 Second leg	Randers (Denmark)	1–3 (2–7 agg.)	(England) Leicester City	Randers, Denmark
18:45 CET (UTC+1)	Piesinger (yellow card) 67'; Odey 84'	Report	Barnes 2'; Maddison 70', 74'; Ndidi (yellow card) 87'	Stadium: Randers Stadium; Attendance: 8,948; Referee: Irfan Peljto (Bosnia and Herzegovina)

===== Round of 16 =====
The round of 16 draw was held on 25 February 2022.

10 March 2022 First leg	Leicester City (England)	2–0	(France) Rennes	Leicester, England
20:00 GMT (UTC±0)	Albrighton 30'; Iheanacho 90+3'	Report	Traoré (yellow card) 34'	Stadium: King Power Stadium; Attendance: 25,848; Referee: Orel Grinfeld (Israel)

17 March 2022 Second leg	Rennes (France)	2–1 (2–3 agg.)	(England) Leicester City	Rennes, France
18:45 CET (UTC+1)	Bourigeaud 8', (yellow card) 74'; Laborde (yellow card) 47'; Aguerd (yellow card) 71'; Tait 75'; Omari (yellow card) 90+6'; Traoré (yellow card) 90+8'	Report	Fofana 51'; Iheanacho (yellow card) 90+5'; Maddison (yellow card) 90+8'; Dewsbury-Hall (yellow card) 90+8'; Vestergaard (yellow card) 90+8'	Stadium: Roazhon Park; Attendance: 27,000; Referee: Anastasios Sidiropoulos (Greece)

===== Quarter-finals =====
The draw for the quarter-finals was held on 18 March 2022.

7 April 2022 First leg	Leicester City (England)	0–0	(Netherlands) PSV Eindhoven	Leicester, England
20:00 BST (UTC+1)	Albrighton (yellow card) 81'	Report		Stadium: King Power Stadium; Attendance: 31,327; Referee: Ivan Kružliak (Slovakia)

14 April 2022 Second leg	PSV Eindhoven (Netherlands)	1–2 (1–2 agg.)	(England) Leicester City	Eindhoven, Netherlands
18:45 CEST (UTC+2)	Zahavi 27'; Götze (yellow card) 90+2'	Report	Castagne (yellow card) 57'; Maddison 77'; Pereira 88'	Stadium: Philips Stadion; Attendance: 35,000; Referee: Benoît Bastien (France)

===== Semi-finals =====
The draw for the semi-finals was held on 18 March 2022, after the quarter-final draw.

28 April 2022 First leg	Leicester City (England)	1–1	(Italy) Roma	Leicester, England
20:00 BST (UTC+1)	Dewsbury-Hall (yellow card) 26'; Vardy (yellow card) 59'; Mancini 67' (o.g.)	Report	Abraham (yellow card) 8'; Pellegrini 15'; Zaniolo (yellow card) 63'	Stadium: King Power Stadium; Attendance: 31,659; Referee: Carlos del Cerro Grande (Spain)

5 May 2022 Second leg	Roma (Italy)	1–0 (2–1 agg.)	(England) Leicester City	Rome, Italy
21:00 CEST (UTC+2)	Abraham 11'; Mancini (yellow card) 41'; Karsdorp (yellow card) 87'	Report	Fofana (yellow card) 68'	Stadium: Stadio Olimpico; Attendance: 63,940; Referee: Srđan Jovanović (Serbia)

== Squad statistics ==
=== Appearances ===
- Italics indicate a loaned player

No.	Pos	Nat	Player	Total		Premier League		FA Cup		EFL Cup		Community Shield		Europe	
No.	Pos	Nat	Player	Apps	Goals	Apps	Goals	Apps	Goals	Apps	Goals	Apps	Goals	Apps	Goals
1	GK	(Denmark)	Kasper Schmeichel	53	0	37	0	0	0	1	0	1	0	14	0
2	DF	(England)	James Justin	19	0	11+2	0	1	0	0	0	0	0	3+2	0
3	DF	(France)	Wesley Fofana	12	1	7	0	0	0	0	0	0	0	5	1
4	DF	(Turkey)	Çağlar Söyüncü	41	1	28	1	1	0	3	0	1	0	7+1	0
5	DF	(England)	Ryan Bertrand	11	0	4	0	0	0	1+1	0	1	0	3+1	0
6	DF	(Northern Ireland)	Jonny Evans	27	2	16+2	1	0	0	1	0	0	0	8	1
7	MF	(England)	Harvey Barnes	48	11	24+8	6	2	1	1	1	1	0	10+2	3
8	MF	(Belgium)	Youri Tielemans	50	7	29+3	6	2	1	2	0	1	0	12+1	0
9	FW	(England)	Jamie Vardy	33	17	20+5	15	0	0	1	2	1	0	3+3	0
10	MF	(England)	James Maddison	53	18	28+7	12	2	1	1+1	1	1	0	8+5	4
11	MF	(England)	Marc Albrighton	31	3	11+6	1	1	1	1+1	0	0+1	0	7+3	1
12	GK	(Wales)	Danny Ward	5	0	1	0	2	0	2	0	0	0	0	0
14	FW	(Nigeria)	Kelechi Iheanacho	43	8	13+13	4	1	1	1+2	1	0+1	1	7+5	1
17	FW	(Spain)	Ayoze Pérez	25	3	6+8	2	1	0	0	0	1	0	3+6	1
18	DF	(Ghana)	Daniel Amartey	38	1	23+5	0	1	0	1	0	1	0	6+1	1
20	MF	(England)	Hamza Choudhury	12	0	4+2	0	1	0	1	0	0	0	0+4	0
21	DF	(Portugal)	Ricardo Pereira	24	2	13+1	1	0+1	0	1+1	0	1	0	5+1	1
22	MF	(England)	Kiernan Dewsbury-Hall	44	3	23+5	1	0+1	0	3	0	0+1	0	9+2	2
23	DF	(Denmark)	Jannik Vestergaard	20	0	6+4	0	1	0	1+2	0	0	0	4+2	0
24	MF	(Senegal)	Nampalys Mendy	15	0	12+2	0	0	0	1	0	0	0	0	0
25	MF	(Nigeria)	Wilfred Ndidi	30	2	17+1	0	1	0	2	0	1	0	7+1	2
27	DF	(Belgium)	Timothy Castagne	35	1	21+5	1	0	0	0	0	0	0	8+1	0
29	FW	(Zambia)	Patson Daka	38	11	13+10	5	0+1	0	2+1	0	0+1	0	7+3	6
33	DF	(England)	Luke Thomas	33	0	21+1	0	1	0	3	0	0+1	0	6	0
35	GK	(Switzerland)	Eldin Jakupović	0	0	0	0	0	0	0	0	0	0	0	0
37	FW	(Nigeria)	Ademola Lookman	42	8	16+10	6	2	0	2	2	0	0	5+7	0
42	MF	(France)	Boubakary Soumaré	29	0	11+7	0	0	0	1+1	0	0+1	0	5+3	0
45	DF	(England)	Ben Nelson	0	0	0	0	0	0	0	0	0	0	0	0
48	MF	(Thailand)	Thanawat Suengchitthawon	0	0	0	0	0	0	0	0	0	0	0	0
51	GK	(United States)	Chituru Odunze	0	0	0	0	0	0	0	0	0	0	0	0
53	MF	(Wales)	Oliver Ewing	0	0	0	0	0	0	0	0	0	0	0	0
54	MF	(Portugal)	Wanya Marçal-Madivadua	1	0	0	0	0+1	0	0	0	0	0	0	0
62	MF	(England)	Lewis Brunt	2	0	0+1	0	1	0	0	0	0	0	0	0
74	MF	(England)	Sammy Braybrooke	0	0	0	0	0	0	0	0	0	0	0	0
77	MF	(England)	Will Alves	1	0	0	0	0+1	0	0	0	0	0	0	0
Out on loan:
26	MF	(Belgium)	Dennis Praet	0	0	0	0	0	0	0	0	0	0	0	0
38	DF	(England)	Vontae Daley-Campbell	2	0	0	0	1	0	0	0	1	0	0	0
41	GK	(Poland)	Jakub Stolarczyk	0	0	0	0	0	0	0	0	0	0	0	0
49	MF	(England)	Kasey McAteer	2	0	0+1	0	0+1	0	0	0	0	0	0	0
No longer at the club:
32	MF	(Ghana)	Kamal Sowah	0	0	0	0	0	0	0	0	0	0	0	0
34	DF	(Croatia)	Filip Benković	0	0	0	0	0	0	0	0	0	0	0	0

=== Goalscorers ===
Rnk	No	Pos	Nat	Name	Premier League	FA Cup	EFL Cup	Community Shield	Europa League	Europa Conference League	Total
1	10	MF	(England)	James Maddison	12	1	1	0	1	3	18
2	9	FW	(England)	Jamie Vardy	15	0	2	0	0	0	17
3	7	MF	(England)	Harvey Barnes	6	1	1	0	1	2	11
3	29	FW	(Zambia)	Patson Daka	5	0	0	0	5	1	11
5	37	MF	(Nigeria)	Ademola Lookman	6	0	2	0	0	0	8
5	14	FW	(Nigeria)	Kelechi Iheanacho	4	1	1	1	0	1	8
7	8	MF	(Belgium)	Youri Tielemans	6	1	0	0	0	0	7
8	17	FW	(Spain)	Ayoze Pérez	2	0	0	0	1	0	3
8	11	MF	(England)	Marc Albrighton	1	1	0	0	0	1	3
8	22	MF	(England)	Kiernan Dewsbury-Hall	1	0	0	0	1	1	3
11	6	DF	(Northern Ireland)	Jonny Evans	1	0	0	0	1	0	2
11	21	DF	(Portugal)	Ricardo Pereira	1	0	0	0	0	1	2
11	25	MF	(Nigeria)	Wilfred Ndidi	0	0	0	0	1	1	2
14
14	4	DF	(Turkey)	Çağlar Söyüncü	1	0	0	0	0	0	1
14	27	DF	(Belgium)	Timothy Castagne	1	0	0	0	0	0	1
14	18	DF	(Ghana)	Daniel Amartey	0	0	0	0	1	0	1
14	3	DF	(France)	Wesley Fofana	0	0	0	0	0	1	1
Own goals					0	0	0	0	0	1	1
Total					62	5	7	1	12	13	100

== See also ==
- 2021–22 in English football
- List of Leicester City F.C. seasons
