= 1927–28 Leicester City F.C. season =

1927–28 season of Leicester City

Leicester City
1927–28 season
- Manager: Willie Orr
- First Division: 3rd
- FA Cup: 5th Round
- Top goalscorer: League: Arthur Chandler (34); All: Arthur Chandler (34)
Home colours

The 1927–28 season was Leicester City's 30th season in the Football League and their 4th in the First Division. Leicester finished the season in their highest ever league finish to date, finishing 3rd in the First Division. Though they would go on to break that again the following season.

Arthur Chandler also broke the club record for the most goals in a single season, scoring 34 times, which he did again in the 1928–29 season. This record still stands as the most goals ever scored by a Leicester player in a single top-tier season.

The 1927–28 season also saw the club's record home attendance, as 47,289 people turned up to watch an FA Cup fifth round match with Tottenham Hotspur.
