= Henry Sparrow =

English footballer

Personal information
- Full name: Henry Sparrow
- Date of birth: 13 June 1889
- Place of birth: Faversham, England
- Date of death: 13 June 1973 (aged 84)
- Place of death: Lincoln, England
- Height: 5 ft 11 in (1.80 m)
- Position: Centre forward

Senior career*
Years	Team	Apps	(Gls)
- Faversham Thursday
1909–1910	Portsmouth	5	(0)
1910–1911	Sittingbourne		(37)
1911–1912	Croydon Common	9	(6)
1911–1913	Leicester Fosse	48	(29)
1913–1914	Tottenham Hotspur	18	(7)
1919–192?	Margate		
- * Club domestic league appearances and goals

Henry Sparrow (13 June 1889 – 13 June 1973) was an English professional footballer who played for Faversham Thursday, Portsmouth, Sittingbourne, Croydon Common, Leicester Fosse, Tottenham Hotspur and Margate.

== Football career ==
Sparrow began his career at his local Non League club Faversham Thursday. He later went on to play for Portsmouth and Croydon Common before joining Leicester Fosse in 1911. The centre forward featured in 48 matches and scored 29 goals between 1911 and 1913. In 1913, Sparrow signed for Tottenham Hotspur where he played a total of 19 matches and scored on seven occasions in all competitions. After leaving White Hart Lane he played for Margate where he ended his playing career.
