= Frederick Osborn (sportsman) =

English cricketer and footballer

Personal information
- Full name: Frederick Osborn
- Born: 10 November 1889; Leicester, Leicestershire, England
- Died: 11 October 1954 (aged 64); North Evington, Leicestershire, England
- Batting: Unknown

Domestic team information
- Years: Team
- 1911–1913: Leicestershire

Career statistics
Competition	First-class
Matches	2
Runs scored	14
Batting average	4.66
100s/50s	–/–
Top score	14
Balls bowled	–
Wickets	–
Bowling average	–
5 wickets in innings	–
10 wickets in match	–
Best bowling	–
Catches/stumpings	2/–
- Source: Cricinfo, 1 March 2012

Frederick Osborn (10 November 1889 – 11 October 1954) was an English cricketer and footballer.

== Cricket ==
Osborn made two first-class appearances for Leicestershire. His first appearance came against Derbyshire in the 1911 County Championship at Aylestone Road, Leicester, while his second came against Lancashire in the 1913 County Championship at Old Trafford. Against Derbyshire, he made scores of 14 in Leicestershire's first-innings, during which he was dismissed by Arnold Warren, while in their second-innings he wasn't required to bat. Against Lancashire, Osborn was dismissed for a duck by Bill Huddleston in Leicestershire's first-innings, while in their second-innings he was dismissed for the same score by Ralph Whitehead.

== Football ==
Freddie Osborn
Personal information
- Position: Forward

Senior career*
Years	Team	Apps	(Gls)
- Avondale
- Hinckley United
1910–1913	Leicester Fosse	67	(29)
1913–1920	Preston North End	68	(40)
- Nuneaton Town
- * Club domestic league appearances and goals

Osborn played as a forward in the Football League for Leicester Fosse and Preston North End.

After being switched from inside forward to centre forward, Osborn was top scorer for Preston in 1913–14 with 26 goals, although the club was still relegated and again the following season with 17 goals as they won promotion back to the First Division, before league football was interrupted by the First World War.

Wounded during the war, Osborn was unable to regain a regular place in the Preston team when the league resumed in 1919, appearing only seven more times for the club.

== Personal life ==
Osborn served in the Royal Field Artillery during the First World War and was wounded by a bullet in the thigh.
