= Pat Ward (footballer) =

Scottish footballer (1926–2003)

Personal information
- Full name: Patrick Ward
- Date of birth: 28 December 1926
- Place of birth: Dumbarton, Scotland
- Date of death: 15 March 2003 (aged 76)
- Place of death: Dumbarton, Scotland
- Position: Wing half

Senior career*
Years	Team	Apps	(Gls)
?–1950?	Glasgow Perthshire	?	
1950?–1955	Hibernian	46	(1)
1955–1958	Leicester City	57	(0)
1958–1959?	Crewe Alexandra	31	(1)
1959?–?	Bedford Town	?	
- * Club domestic league appearances and goals

Pat Ward (28 December 1926 – 15 March 2003) was a Scottish-born footballer who played as a wing half in the 1950s.

He was born in Dumbarton, and after playing for junior side Glasgow Perthshire he was signed by Hibernian. He made his debut for Hibs on 24 March 1951 against St Mirren, although he did not play many games in his first three seasons. Ward made his breakthrough in 1953–54, with 26 appearances, although after a further 19 matches in the following campaign, he was transferred to Leicester City. In all he played 53 times for Hibs, scoring one goal (against Raith Rovers on 16 October 1954).

He made a total of 57 English Football League appearances for Leicester, and for a time kept Colin Appleton out of the left half position. In the 1957–58 season he made three appearances for Leicester.

Ward left Leicester for Crewe Alexandra, and made 31 League appearances for them before joining Bedford Town.
