= Danny Liddle =

Scottish footballer

Personal information
- Full name: Daniel Hamilton Sneddon Liddle
- Date of birth: 17 February 1912
- Place of birth: Bo'ness, Scotland
- Date of death: 9 June 1982 (aged 70)
- Place of death: Wigston, Leicestershire, England
- Height: 5 ft 7 1/2 in (1.71 m)
- Position: Forward

Youth career
- Wallyford Bluebell

Senior career*
Years	Team	Apps	(Gls)
1929–1932	East Fife	100	(22)
1932–1946	Leicester City		
1946–1947	Mansfield Town	1	(0)
- Stamford

International career
1931	Scotland	3	(0)
- * Club domestic league appearances and goals

Daniel Hamilton Sneddon Liddle (17 February 1912 – 9 June 1982) was a Scottish footballer, who played for East Fife, Leicester City, Mansfield Town and Scotland.
