= Tommy Galbraith =

Scottish footballer

Personal information
- Date of birth: 15 January 1875
- Place of birth: Bonhill, Scotland
- Position: Winger

Senior career*
Years	Team	Apps	(Gls)
1896–1897	Renton		
1897	Vale of Leven		
1897–1898	Sunderland	2	(0)
1898–1900	Leicester Fosse	62	(17)
1900–190?	Vale of Leven		
- * Club domestic league appearances and goals

Thomas Galbraith (15 January 1875 – after 1899) was a Scottish professional footballer who played as a winger for Sunderland.
