= 2012–13 Leicester City F.C. season =

108th season in existence of Leicester City

Leicester City
2012–13 season
- Chairman: Vichai Raksriaksorn
- Manager: Nigel Pearson
- Stadium: King Power Stadium
- Football League Championship: 6th
- FA Cup: Fourth round
- League Cup: Second round
- Top goalscorer: League: David Nugent (14); All: David Nugent (16)
- Highest home attendance: 29,560 (vs. Watford, Championship Play-offs, 9.5.2013)
- Lowest home attendance: 8,560 (vs. Burton Albion, League Cup, 28.8.2012)
Home colours	Away colours	Third colours

The 2012–13 season was Leicester City F.C.'s 108th season in the English football league system and their 61st (non-consecutive) season in the second tier of English football. It was their fourth consecutive season in the Championship.

Leicester began with a promising first half of the season and sat in second place at the beginning of February. However, a dramatic downturn in form which saw the Foxes win just 2 of their following 16 games saw Leicester not only drop out of the automatic promotion places, but the play-offs as well and they began the final game of the season against local rivals Nottingham Forest in eighth place. The Foxes won 2–3 with a dramatic late winner from Anthony Knockaert, and coupled with Bolton Wanderers failing to win, Leicester took the final play-off spot and finished sixth.

Leicester eventually lost to Watford in the play-off semi-final though, after a dramatic winner deep into injury time by Troy Deeney, which came as the result of a counter-attack from Anthony Knockaert's missed penalty (which would have sent Leicester through to the final).

== Pre-season ==
=== Pre-season events ===
Note: This section does not include close season transfers or pre-season match results, which are listed in their own sections below.

- 29 June 2012 – Conrad Logan signs a one-year contract extension which ends in 2013.
- 19 July 2012 – Wes Morgan is named as Club Captain.

=== Kit and sponsorship ===
On 28 April 2012, it was announced on the official Leicester City website that the new kit supplier for the 2012–13 season would be Puma.

=== Friendlies ===
Win Draw Loss Upcoming fixture

24 July 2012	Hinckley United	1–4	Leicester City	Hinckley
19:30 BST	Greene 42'	Report	King 3'; Nugent 52'; Vardy 53'; Marshall 61'	Stadium: Greene King Stadium; Attendance: 3,411

28 July 2012	Shrewsbury Town	2–0	Leicester City	Shrewsbury
15:00 BST	Gornell; Morgan	Report		Stadium: Greenhous Meadow; Attendance: 1,800; Referee: C. Sargeson

31 July 2012	Leicester City XI	2–2	York City	Leicester
	Blyth; Beckford		Chambers; Coulson	Stadium: King Power Stadium

1 August 2012	Burton Albion	1–3	Leicester City	Burton upon Trent
19:45 BST	Weir	Report	Schlupp 28'; Dyer 79'; Danns 88'	Stadium: Pirelli Stadium

4 August 2012	Lincoln City	C – C	Leicester City	Lincoln
		Report		Stadium: Sincil Bank

7 August 2012	Nuneaton Town	1–3	Leicester City	Nuneaton
19:30 BST	James	Report	Beckford 2 Futacs	Stadium: Triton Showers Community Stadium

11 August 2012	Leicester City	1–0	Sunderland	Leicester
15:00 BST	Parkes 72'	Report		Stadium: King Power Stadium; Attendance: 9,293

== Events ==
Note:This section does not include transfers or match results, which are listed in their own sections below.

- 21 September 2012 – Liam Moore signs a contract extension to 2015.
- 21 September 2012 – Academy players, Harry Panayiotou and Joe Dodoo, sign their first professional contracts.
- 25 March 2013 – Jermaine Beckford makes his debut for Jamaica.
- 1 May 2013 – George Taft, Jacob Blyth and James Pearson sign one-year contract extensions.
- 1 May 2013 – Rob Paratore signs his first professional contract ending in 2014.
- 7 May 2013 – Jamie Anton and Jak McCourt sign professional contracts.
- 15 May 2013 – Alie Sesay and Callum Elder sign new deals.

== Players and staff ==
=== 2012–13 squad ===
- This section lists players who were in Leicester's first team squad at any point during the 2012–13 season
- Asterisks indicates player left mid-season
- Hash symbol indicates player retired mid-season
- Italics indicate loan player

No.	Nationality	Name	Position	Joined	Signed from
Goalkeepers
1	(Denmark)	Kasper Schmeichel	GK	2011	(England) Leeds United
13	(Republic of Ireland)	Conrad Logan	GK	2004	Youth
	(England)	Adam Smith	GK	2010	(England) Middlesbrough
Defenders
2	(Belgium)	Ritchie De Laet	RB / CB / LB	2012	(England) Manchester United
3	(England)	Paul Konchesky	LB	2011	(England) Liverpool
5	(England)	Wes Morgan	CB	2012	(England) Nottingham Forest
6	(United States)	Zak Whitbread	CB	2012	(England) Norwich City
12	(Republic of Ireland)	Sean St Ledger	CB	2011	(England) Preston North End
15	(England)	Michael Keane	CB / RB	Loan	(England) Manchester United
22	(England)	Liam Moore	CB / RB	2011	Youth
23	(England)	Tom Kennedy*	LB	2010	(England) Rochdale
	(Republic of Ireland)	Cian Bolger*	CB	2009	Youth
	(England)	George Taft	CB	2011	Youth
Midfielders
4	(England)	Danny Drinkwater	CM	2012	(England) Manchester United
7	(England)	Ben Marshall	RW / LW / AM	2012	(England) Stoke City
8	(England)	Neil Danns	CM / RW	2011	(England) Crystal Palace
10	(Wales)	Andy King	CM	2006	Youth
11	(England)	Lloyd Dyer	LW / RW	2008	(England) Milton Keynes Dons
16	(England)	Matty James	CM	2012	(England) Manchester United
19	(England)	Richie Wellens	CM	2009	(England) Doncaster Rovers
23	(England)	Jesse Lingard*	AM / RW / LW	Loan	(England) Manchester United
24	(France)	Anthony Knockaert	AM / LW / RW	2012	(France) Guingamp
Forwards
9	(England)	Jamie Vardy	CF	2012	(England) Fleetwood Town
14	(England)	Martyn Waghorn	CF	2010	(England) Sunderland
17	(Scotland)	Paul Gallagher	AM / RW / CF	2009	(England) Blackburn Rovers
18	(Ghana)	Jeffrey Schlupp	CF / LW / LB	2010	Youth
20	(Jamaica)	Jermaine Beckford	CF	2011	(England) Everton
21	(England)	Tom Hopper	CF	2011	Youth
29	(Hungary)	Márkó Futács	CF	2012	(England) Portsmouth
35	(England)	David Nugent	CF / LW	2011	Unattached
37	(England)	Harry Kane	CF	Loan	(England) Tottenham Hotspur
39	(New Zealand)	Chris Wood	CF	2013	(England) West Bromwich Albion
	(England)	Jacob Blyth	CF	2012	(England) Leamington
	(England)	Harry Panayiotou	CF / AM	2012	Youth

=== 2012–13 backroom staff ===
- This section lists members of staff who were in Leicester's first team squad at any point during the 2012–13 season
- Asterisks indicate member of staff left mid-season

Position	Nationality	Name
Manager	(England)	Nigel Pearson
Assistant Manager	(England)	Craig Shakespeare
Assistant Manager/Head of Recruitment	(England)	Steve Walsh
First Team Coach/Goalkeeping Coach	(England)	Mike Stowell
Head Physio	(England)	David Rennie
Academy Manager	(England)	Jon Rudkin
Academy Coach (Under 18s)	(England)	Steve Beaglehole
Academy Coach (Under 16s)	(England)	Trevor Peake

== Transfers ==
=== In ===
Date	Position	Nationality	Name	From	Fee
10 May 2012	CF	(England)	Jacob Blyth	(England) Leamington	Undisclosed
15 May 2012	CB	(Belgium)	Ritchie De Laet	(England) Manchester United	Undisclosed
15 May 2012	CM	(England)	Matty James	(England) Manchester United	Undisclosed
18 May 2012	CF	(England)	Jamie Vardy	(England) Fleetwood Town	Undisclosed
18 July 2012	CF	(Hungary)	Márkó Futács	(England) Portsmouth	Free
24 July 2012	CB	(United States)	Zak Whitbread	(England) Norwich City	Free
1 August 2012	RW	(France)	Anthony Knockaert	(France) Guingamp	Undisclosed
19 September 2012	CB	(England)	James Pearson	Free agent	Free
23 November 2012	CB	(England)	Karlton Watson	Free agent	Free
1 January 2013	CF	(New Zealand)	Chris Wood	(England) West Bromwich Albion	Undisclosed
11 March 2013	CM	(Republic of Ireland)	Conor Clifford	Free agent	Free

=== Out ===
Date	Position	Nationality	Name	To	Fee
18 June 2012	CB	(Ivory Coast)	Sol Bamba	(Turkey) Trabzonspor	Undisclosed
4 July 2012	CB	(England)	Matt Mills	(England) Bolton Wanderers	Undisclosed
4 August 2012	RB	(England)	Lee Peltier	(England) Leeds United	Undisclosed
20 August 2012	CB	(England)	Tom Parkes	(England) Bristol Rovers	Undisclosed
23 August 2012	CM	(Republic of Ireland)	Shane Byrne	(England) Bury	Undisclosed
31 January 2013	CB	(Republic of Ireland)	Cian Bolger	(England) Bolton Wanderers	Undisclosed

=== Loans in ===
Date from	Date to	Position	Nationality	Name	From
6 November 2012	2 February 2013 (Extended until end of season)	CB	(England)	Michael Keane	(England) Manchester United
6 November 2012	2 January 2013	AM	(England)	Jesse Lingard	(England) Manchester United
21 February 2013	End of season	CF	(England)	Harry Kane	(England) Tottenham Hotspur

=== Loans out ===
Date from	Date to	Position	Nationality	Name	To
31 August 2012	January 2013	CB	(Republic of Ireland)	Cian Bolger	(England) Bristol Rovers
6 September 2012	May 2013	AM	(Peru)	Pier Larrauri	(Mexico) Pachuca
13 September 2012	October 2012	LW	(Scotland)	Paul Gallagher	(England) Sheffield United
14 September 2012	October 2012	CF	(England)	Tom Hopper	(England) Bury
28 September 2012	End of season	CF	(Jamaica)	Jermaine Beckford	(England) Huddersfield Town
4 October 2012	10 November 2012	CM	(England)	Richie Wellens	(England) Ipswich Town
25 October 2012	3 January 2013	GK	(England)	Adam Smith	(England) Nuneaton Town
14 November 2012	12 December 2012	CM	(England)	Neil Danns	(England) Bristol City
20 November 2012	January 2013	CF	(England)	Jacob Blyth	(England) Burton Albion
23 November 2012	23 December 2012	CB	(England)	Jide Maduako	(England) Ilkeston
30 November 2012	30 December 2012	CB	(Northern Ireland)	Steven Smith	(England) Ilkeston
8 January 2012	End of Season	CM	(England)	Neil Danns	(England) Huddersfield Town
1 February 2013	1 March 2013	CB	(England)	Jide Maduako	(England) Ilkeston
13 February 2013	13 March 2013	CF	(England)	Jacob Blyth	(England) Notts County
20 February 2013	27 April 2013	CB	(England)	Liam Moore	(England) Brentford
1 March 2013	28 March 2013	CB	(Northern Ireland)	Steven Smith	(England) Braintree Town
5 March 2013	5 April 2013	CF	(Hungary)	Márkó Futács	(England) Blackpool
30 March 2013	3 May 2013	CB	(Republic of Ireland)	Sean St Ledger	(England) Millwall

=== Released ===
Date	Position	Nationality	Name
30 May 2012	CM	(Belgium)	Franck Moussa
30 June 2012	RB	(Ghana)	John Pantsil
30 June 2012	CF	(England)	Darius Vassell
30 June 2012	CF	(Scotland)	Steve Howard
30 June 2012	CF	(Wales)	Elliott Chamberlain
30 June 2012	CM	(England)	Matt Oakley
30 June 2012	CB	(Bulgaria)	Aleksandar Tunchev
30 June 2012	GK	(England)	Chris Weale
29 August 2012	LB	(England)	Tom Kennedy

== Results ==
Win Draw Loss Upcoming fixture

=== Football League Championship ===
18 August 2012 1	Leicester City	2–0	Peterborough United	Leicester
15:00 BST	Marshall (yellow card) 22'; Morgan 51'; King 71'; De Laet (yellow card) 90+2'	Report	Taylor (yellow card) 32'	Stadium: King Power Stadium; Attendance: 23,828; Referee: Craig Pawson

21 August 2012 2	Charlton Athletic	2–1	Leicester City	London
19:45 BST	Wright-Phillips 18'; Kermorgant 32'	Report	Morgan (yellow card) 34'; King 53'	Stadium: The Valley; Attendance: 16,658 (1,628 away); Referee: Fred Graham

25 August 2012 3	Blackburn Rovers	2–1	Leicester City	Blackburn
15:00 BST	Nuno Gomes 33'; Murphy (yellow card) 50'; Pedersen 80'	Report	De Laet (yellow card) 48'; Vardy 56'	Stadium: Ewood Park; Attendance: 13,935 (1,741 away); Referee: Bobby Madley

1 September 2012 4	Leicester City	1–0	Blackpool	Leicester
17:20 BST	Marshall 54' (pen.)	Report	Gomes (yellow card) 52'; Taylor-Flectcher (yellow card) 53'	Stadium: King Power Stadium; Attendance: 18,655; Referee: Michael Jones

16 September 2012 5	Wolverhampton Wanderers	2–1	Leicester City	Wolverhampton
13:15 BST	Ebanks-Blake 13'; Stearman 21'; Henry (yellow card) 80'	Report	Konchesky (yellow card) 53', (goal) 70'; Nugent (yellow card) 58'	Stadium: Molineux Stadium; Attendance: 20,030 (1,375 away); Referee: Stuart Attwell

19 September 2012 6	Leicester City	2–1	Burnley	Leicester
19:45 BST	Nugent (yellow card) 38', (goal) 47'; Vardy 57'; Knockaert (yellow card) 73'; De Laet (yellow card) 86'	Report	Marney 10'; Paterson (yellow card) 26'	Stadium: King Power Stadium; Attendance: 18,480; Referee: Stuart Attwell

23 September 2012 7	Leicester City	3–1	Hull City	Leicester
15:00 BST	Nugent 7', 42', 90+1'	Report	Simpson 26'	Stadium: King Power Stadium; Attendance: 20,815; Referee: Eddie Ilderton

29 September 2012 8	Middlesbrough	1–2	Leicester City	Middlesbrough
15:00 BST	Bailey 50'; Amougou (yellow card) 90+2'	Report	Vardy 62'; Dyer 89'	Stadium: Riverside Stadium; Attendance: 15,679 (918 away); Referee: Andrew Madley

2 October 2012 9	Huddersfield Town	0–2	Leicester City	Huddersfield
19:45 BST	Dixon (yellow card) 54'	Report	Knockaert 30', 60', (yellow card) 58'	Stadium: John Smith's Stadium; Attendance: 13,821 (1,563 away); Referee: Phil Gibbs

6 October 2012 10	Leicester City	2–0	Bristol City	Leicester
15:00 BST	Nugent 19'; Foster 74' (o.g.)	Report	Carey (yellow card) 49'; Morris (yellow card) 81'	Stadium: King Power Stadium; Attendance: 22,529; Referee: Trevor Kettle

20 October 2012 11	Birmingham City	1–1	Leicester City	Birmingham
15:00 BST	Spector (yellow card) 6' (yellow-red card) 90'; Hurst (yellow card) 11'; Løvenkrands 45+2'; Morrison (yellow card) 66'	Report	Whitbread (yellow card) 44'; Waghorn (yellow card) 70'; Marshall 86'	Stadium: St Andrew's; Attendance: 18,271 (3,752 away); Referee: Tony Bates

24 October 2012 12	Leicester City	1–0	Brighton & Hove Albion	Leicester
15:00 BST	King 10'; De Laet (yellow card) 53'	Report	Bridcutt (yellow card) 67'	Stadium: King Power Stadium; Attendance: 25,726; Referee: Neil Swarbrick

27 October 2012 13	Leicester City	1–2	Crystal Palace	Leicester
15:00 BST	Vardy (yellow card) 26'; De Laet (yellow card) 74'; King 90+2'	Report	Delaney 23'; Ramage 28'; Moxey (yellow card) 90+4'	Stadium: King Power Stadium; Attendance: 23,646; Referee: Andy Haines

3 November 2012 14	Watford	2–1	Leicester City	Watford
15:00 GMT	Abdi 14'; Forestieri 68'	Report	Drinkwater (yellow card) 45'; Whitbread (yellow card) 45+2' (yellow-red card) 83'; Nugent 71'	Stadium: Vicarage Road; Attendance: 12,954 (2,058 away); Referee: Andy D'Urso

6 November 2012 15	Bolton Wanderers	0–0	Leicester City	Bolton
20:00 GMT	Ricketts (yellow card) 33'; Pratley (yellow card) 42'	Report		Stadium: Reebok Stadium; Attendance: 16,754 (1,227 away); Referee: Martin Atkinson

10 November 2012 16	Leicester City	2–2	Nottingham Forest	Leicester
12:45 GMT	Ward 7' (o.g.); Nugent 32'		Guedioura 22'; Cox 67' (pen.)	Stadium: King Power Stadium; Attendance: 24,793; Referee: Anthony Taylor

17 November 2012 17	Leicester City	6–0	Ipswich Town	Leicester
15:00 GMT	Nugent 8' (pen.), 18'; Dyer 18'; Knockaert 44'; Waghorn 53'; Futács 82'	Report	Reo-Coker (yellow card) 90'	Stadium: King Power Stadium; Attendance: 20,779; Referee: Keith Stroud

24 November 2012 18	Sheffield Wednesday	0–2	Leicester City	Sheffield
15:00 GMT	Sidibé (yellow card) 42'; Lines (yellow card) 83'	Report	Drinkwater 41'; Whitbread (yellow card) 45+2'; Schlupp (yellow card) 45+4'; Marshall 76'	Stadium: Hillsborough; Attendance: 24,664 (3,803 away); Referee: Paul Tierney

28 November 2012 19	Leeds United	1–0	Leicester City	Leeds
19:45 GMT	Becchio 3' (pen.)	Report	De Laet (yellow card) 51'	Stadium: Elland Road; Attendance: 17,717; Referee: Mick Russell

1 December 2012 20	Leicester City	4–1	Derby County	Leicester
17:20 GMT	Whitbread 6'; Waghorn 23'; Nugent 74', 89'	Report	Coutts (yellow card) 11'; Robinson 38'	Stadium: King Power Stadium; Attendance: 20,680; Referee: Geoff Eltringham

8 December 2012 21	Leicester City	2–2	Barnsley	Leicester
15:00 GMT	Knockaert 9'; Nugent (yellow card) 54'; Marshall (yellow card) 70'; Vardy 90'	Report	Dawson 27'; Noble-Lazarus 39'; Wiseman (yellow card) 54'	Stadium: King Power Stadium; Attendance: 23,579; Referee: James Adcock

15 December 2012 22	Millwall	1–0	Leicester City	London
15:00 GMT	Abdou (yellow card) 20'; Taylor 67'; Shittu (yellow card) 83'	Report	Nugent (yellow card) 20'; Knockaert (yellow card) 35'; Futács (yellow card) 86'	Stadium: The Den; Attendance: 10,189; Referee: Simon Hooper

22 December 2012 23	Leicester City	0–1	Cardiff City	Leicester
15:00 GMT		Report	Bellamy 25'; Turner (yellow card) 38'; Connolly (yellow card) 61'; Whittingham (yellow card) 79'	Stadium: King Power Stadium; Attendance: 25,055; Referee: Graham Salisbury

26 December 2012 24	Hull City	0–0	Leicester City	Kingston upon Hull
15:00 GMT		Report	De Laet (yellow card) 38'; Whitbread (yellow card) 65'	Stadium: KC Stadium; Attendance: 20,321; Referee: Craig Pawson

29 December 2012 25	Burnley	0–1	Leicester City	Burnley
15:00 GMT	Duff (yellow card) 69'; Trippier (yellow card) 90+4'; Vokes (yellow card) 90+6'	Report	Nugent 31'; Dyer (yellow card) 69'; Drinkwater (yellow card) 90+4'	Stadium: Turf Moor; Attendance: 13,050 (1,233 away); Referee: Michael Naylor

1 January 2013 26	Leicester City	6–1	Huddersfield Town	Leicester
15:00 GMT	Wood 6', 24'; De Laet 45+1'; Knockaert 49', 51'; Waghorn 76'	Report	Lynch (yellow card) 43'; Arfield 60'	Stadium: King Power Stadium; Attendance: 25,913; Referee: Mark Haywood

12 January 2013 27	Bristol City	0–4	Leicester City	Bristol
15:00 GMT		Report	Wood 11', 18', 41'; James 49'	Stadium: Ashton Gate; Attendance: 13,078 (1,786 away); Referee: Oliver Langford

18 January 2013 28	Leicester City	1–0	Middlesbrough	Leicester
20:00 GMT	Konchesky (yellow card) 50'; Keane (yellow card) 58'; Nugent 70'	Report	Ladesma (yellow card) 20'	Stadium: King Power Stadium; Attendance: 8,585; Referee: Roger East

31 January 2013 29	Leicester City	2–1	Wolverhampton Wanderers	Leicester
19:45 GMT	Knockaert 24'; Nugent 73'	Report	Sako 51'; Foley (yellow card) 76'	Stadium: King Power Stadium; Attendance: 21,677; Referee: Bobby Madley

9 February 2013 30	Peterborough United	2–1	Leicester City	Peterborough
19:45 GMT	Petrucci 79'; McCann 88'	Report	Marshall 52'; De Laet (yellow card) 79'	Stadium: London Road Stadium; Attendance: 11,070; Referee: Graham Scott

19 February 2013 31	Leicester City	1–2	Charlton Athletic	Leicester
19:45 GMT	Wood 69'	Report	Kermorgant 19'; Jackson (yellow card) 30'; Haynes 78'	Stadium: King Power Stadium; Attendance: 19,920; Referee: Michael Naylor

23 February 2013 32	Blackpool	0–0	Leicester City	Blackpool
15:00 GMT	Cathcart (yellow card) 53'; Phillips (yellow card) 77'	Report	King (yellow card) 55'	Stadium: Bloomfield Road; Attendance: 14,509; Referee: Simon Hooper

26 February 2013 33	Leicester City	3–0	Blackburn Rovers	Leicester
19:45 GMT	Wood 29'; Kane 42'; King 90+3'	Report		Stadium: King Power Stadium; Attendance: 19,561; Referee: Geoff Eltringham

2 March 2013 34	Ipswich	1–0	Leicester City	Ipswich
15:00 GMT	Hyam (yellow card) 74'; McGoldrick 85'	Report	Knockaert (yellow card) 46'; Morgan (yellow card) 82'	Stadium: Portman Road; Attendance: 17,021; Referee: D Deadman

5 March 2013 35	Leicester City	1–1	Leeds United	Leicester
19:45 GMT	Marshall (yellow card) 80'; Keane 90+4'	Report	Byram 52'; Kenny (yellow card) 67'	Stadium: King Power Stadium; Attendance: 22,660; Referee: Paul Tierney

9 March 2013 36	Leicester City	0–1	Sheffield Wednesday	Leicester
15:00 GMT	Nugent (yellow card) 17'	Report	Buxton (yellow card) 57'; Wickham 70'	Stadium: King Power Stadium; Attendance: 24,883; Referee: Phil Gibbs

12 March 2013 37	Cardiff City	1–1	Leicester City	Cardiff
19:45 GMT	Noone (yellow card) 27'; Nugent (yellow card) 66'; Gestede 90+3'	Report	Nugent (yellow card) 11'; St Ledger (yellow card) 20'; Keane 72'; Keane (yellow card) 80'	Stadium: Cardiff City Stadium; Attendance: 23,231; Referee: Nigel Miller

16 March 2013 38	Derby County	2–1	Leicester City	Derby
17:20 GMT	Keogh 16'; Ward (yellow card) 22'; Coutts (yellow card) 37'; Martin 44'; Freemnan 81'	Report	Keane (yellow card) 51'; Schlupp 62'; St Ledger (yellow card) 90+6'	Stadium: Pride Park; Attendance: 23,123; Referee: K Stroud

29 March 2013 39	Leicester City	0–1	Millwall	Leicester
19:45 GMT	Morgan (red card) 3'	Report	Hulse (yellow card) 60'; Chaplow (yellow card) 68'; Trotter (yellow card) 70'; Dunne (yellow card) 74'; Dunne 87'	Stadium: King Power Stadium; Attendance: 22,365; Referee: S Attwell

1 April 2013 40	Barnsley	2–0	Leicester City	Barnsley
15:00 GMT	Keane 4' (o.g.); O'Grady 40'; Dawson (yellow card) 68'	Report	Nugent (yellow card) 76'; Marshall (yellow card) 87'	Stadium: Oakwell; Attendance: 10.429; Referee: Andy D'Urso

6 April 2013 41	Brighton & Hove Albion	1–1	Leicester City	Brighton
15:00 GMT	LuaLua 88'; Calderón (yellow card) 90+3'	Report	Nugent (yellow card) 1'; Moore (yellow card) 65'; James 73'	Stadium: Amex Stadium; Attendance: 28,493; Referee: J Moss

12 April 2013 42	Leicester City	2–2	Birmingham City	Leicester
19:45 GMT	Davies 12' (o.g.); Schlupp 75'	Report	Žigić 61'; Davies (yellow card) 85'; Burke 90+1' (pen.)	Stadium: King Power Stadium; Attendance: 25,554; Referee: M Russell

16 April 2013 43	Leicester City	3–2	Bolton	Leicester
19:45 GMT	Wood 39' (pen.); Dyer 41'; Dyer (yellow card) 43'; Schlupp 79'	Report	N'Gog 3' (pen.); Pratley 71'; Alonso (yellow card) 90+6'	Stadium: King Power Stadium; Attendance: 22,442; Referee: E Ilderton

20 April 2013 44	Crystal Palace	2–2	Leicester City	Selhurst
15:00 GMT	Moxey (yellow card) 23'; Gabbidon 26'; Delaney (yellow card) 31'; Dobbie 67'; Dikgacoi (yellow card) 82'	Report	King 37'; James (yellow card) 45'; Wood 73'	Stadium: Selhurst Park; Attendance: 18,563; Referee: A Madley

26 April 2013 45	Leicester City	1–2	Watford	Leicester
19:45 GMT	Kane 61'	Report	Deeney 41'; Chalobah 43'	Stadium: King Power Stadium; Attendance: 25,091; Referee: Craig Pawson

4 May 2013 46	Nottingham Forest	2–3	Leicester City	Nottingham
12:45 GMT	Cox 3'; Ward 50'	Report	James 24'; King 43'; Knockaert 90+2'	Stadium: City Ground; Attendance: 28,646; Referee: Mike Dean

==== Promotion Play-offs ====
9 May 2013 Semi-final 1st leg	Leicester City	1–0	Watford	Leicester
19:45 GMT	Schlupp (yellow card) 30'; Morgan (yellow card) 38'; Knockaert (yellow card) 45+2'; Keane (yellow card) 58'; Nugent 82'	Report	Anya (yellow card) 6'; Pudil (yellow card) 74'; Hall (yellow card) 90+4'	Stadium: King Power Stadium; Attendance: 29,560; Referee: Neil Swarbrick

12 May 2013 Semi-final 2nd leg	Watford	3–1 (3–2 agg.)	Leicester City	Watford
12:30 GMT	Vydra 15', 65'; Cassetti (yellow card) 69'; Deeney 90+7' (yellow card) 90+10'	Report	Nugent 19'; Wood (yellow card) 30'; Knockaert (penalty missed) 90+7'	Stadium: Vicarage Road; Attendance: 16,142; Referee: Michael Oliver

=== FA Cup ===
5 January 2013 3rd round Proper	Leicester City	2–0	Burton Albion	Leicester
15:00 GMT	Wood 3'; De Laet 21'	Report		Stadium: King Power Stadium; Attendance: 14,463; Referee: Andy D'Urso

26 January 2013 4th Round Proper	Huddersfield Town	1–1	Leicester City	Huddersfield
15:00 GMT	Norwood (yellow card) 50'; Novak (yellow card) 70', (goal) 74' (pen.)	Report	Keane (yellow card); Wood 82'	Stadium: John Smith's Stadium; Attendance: 11,945 (4,000 away); Referee: Anthony Taylor

12 February 2013 4th Round Proper Replay	Leicester City	1–2	Huddersfield Town	Leicester
19:30 GMT	Keane 7'; Gallagher (yellow card) 81'; Knockaert (yellow card) 88'	Report	Clayton 5'; Gerrard 73'; Scannell 75'	Stadium: King Power Stadium; Attendance: 14,517; Referee: James Adcock

=== Football League Cup ===
14 August 2012 1st round	Torquay United	0–4	Leicester City	Torquay
19:45 BST		Report	Dyer 21'; Marshall 36'; James 50'; Vardy 77'	Stadium: Plainmoor; Attendance: 3,367 (1,166 away); Referee: Oliver Langford

28 August 2012 2nd round	Leicester City	2–4	Burton Albion	Leicester
19:45 BST	Knockaert 60'; Futács 87'	Report	Palmer 20'; Taylor 53'; Weir 64' (pen.); Maghoma 68'; Dyer (yellow card) 72'	Stadium: King Power Stadium; Attendance: 8,560; Referee: Darren Drysdale

== Awards ==
=== Club awards ===
At the end of the season, Leicester's annual award ceremony, including categories voted for by the players and backroom staff, the supporters and the supporters club, saw the following players recognised for their achievements for the club throughout the 2012–13 season.

Player of the Year Award	(England) Wes Morgan
Young Player of the Season Award	(France) Anthony Knockaert
Players' Player of the Season Award	(England) Wes Morgan
Supporters' Club Player of the Season Award	(England) Wes Morgan
Academy Player of the Season Award	(England) Michael Cain
Goal of the Season Award	(France) Anthony Knockaert (vs. Huddersfield Town, 2 October 2012)
Performance of the Season	vs. Bolton Wanderers, 16 April 2013
Champagne Moment Award	(Denmark) Kasper Schmeichel save (vs. Blackburn Rovers, 26 February 2013)

=== Divisional awards ===
Date	Nation	Winner	Award
21 August 2012	(Belgium)	Ritchie De Laet	Championship Team of the Week
21 August 2012	(England)	Wes Morgan	Championship Team of the Week
3 September 2012	(England)	Liam Moore	Championship Team of the Week
24 September 2012	(England)	David Nugent	Championship Team of the Week
8 October 2012	(Denmark)	Kasper Schmeichel	Championship Team of the Week
19 November 2012	(England)	Lloyd Dyer	Championship Team of the Week
19 November 2012	(England)	Wes Morgan	Championship Team of the Week
29 November 2012	(England)	Danny Drinkwater	Championship Team of the Week
3 December 2012	(United States)	Zak Whitbread	Championship Team of the Week
31 December 2012	(England)	Wes Morgan	Championship Team of the Week
15 January 2013	(Denmark)	Kasper Schmeichel	Championship Team of the Week
15 January 2013	(New Zealand)	Chris Wood	Championship Team of the Week
22 January 2013	(Denmark)	Kasper Schmeichel	Championship Team of the Week
22 January 2013	(England)	David Nugent	Championship Team of the Week
January 2013	(England)	Nigel Pearson	Championship Manager of the Month
22 April 2013	(Wales)	Andy King	Championship Team of the Week
7 May 2013	(Wales)	Andy King	Championship Team of the Week
7 May 2013	(France)	Anthony Knockaert	Championship Team of the Week
Season	(Denmark)	Kasper Schmeichel	PFA Team of the Year
Season	(England)	Wes Morgan	PFA Team of the Year

== Championship statistics ==
=== Championship table ===
Pos	Team	Pld	W	D	L	GF	GA	GD	Pts	Promotion or relegation
4	Brighton & Hove Albion	46	19	18	9	69	43	+26	75	Qualification for Championship play-offs
5	Crystal Palace (O, P)	46	19	15	12	73	62	+11	72	Qualification for Championship play-offs
6	Leicester City	46	19	11	16	71	48	+23	68	Qualification for Championship play-offs
7	Bolton Wanderers	46	18	14	14	69	61	+8	68	
8	Nottingham Forest	46	17	16	13	63	59	+4	67	

Updated to match(es) played on 4 May 2013. Source: BBC Sport
Rules for classification: 1) points; 2) goal difference; 3) number of goals scored.
(O) Play-off winners; (P) Promoted

=== Club standings ===
Overall								Home						Away					
Pld	W	D	L	GF	GA	GD	Pts	W	D	L	GF	GA	GD	W	D	L	GF	GA	GD
46	19	11	16	71	48	+23	68	13	4	6	46	23	+23	6	7	10	25	25	0

Last updated: 9 May 2013.
Source: LCFC Championship Results

==== Results by round ====
Round	1	2	3	4	5	6	7	8	9	10	11	12	13	14	15	16	17	18	19	20	21	22	23	24	25	26	27	28	29	30	31	32	33	34	35	36	37	38	39	40	41	42	43	44	45	46
Ground	H	A	A	H	A	H	H	A	A	H	A	H	H	A	A	H	H	A	A	H	H	A	H	A	A	H	A	H	H	A	H	A	H	A	H	H	A	A	H	A	A	H	H	A	H	A
Result	W	L	L	W	L	W	W	W	W	W	D	W	L	L	D	D	W	W	L	W	D	L	L	D	W	W	W	W	W	L	L	D	W	L	D	L	D	L	L	L	D	D	W	D	L	W
Position	3	9	17	9	16	10	7	5	2	1	1	1	2	4	5	5	5	3	4	3	5	5	5	5	5	5	3	2	2	2	5	5	5	5	5	5	5	6	7	7	7	8	6	7	8	6

Updated to match(es) played on 9 May 2013. Source: Football League Championship matches
A = Away; H = Home; W = Win; D = Draw; L = Loss

=== Scores by club ===
Leicester City score given first.

Opposition	Home score	Away score	Double
Barnsley	1–1	0–2	
Birmingham City	2–2	1–1	
Blackburn Rovers	3–0	1–2	
Blackpool	1–0	0–0	
Bolton Wanderers	3–2	0–0	
Brighton & Hove Albion	1–0	1–1	
Bristol City	2–0	4–0	Leicester do double
Burnley	2–1	1–0	Leicester do double
Cardiff City	0–1	1–1	
Charlton Athletic	1–2	1–2	Charlton Athletic do double
Crystal Palace	1–2	2–2	
Derby County	4–1	1–2	
Huddersfield Town	6–1	2–0	Leicester do double
Hull City	3–1	0–0	
Ipswich Town	6–0	0–1	
Leeds United	1–1	0–1	
Middlesbrough	1–0	2–1	Leicester do double
Millwall	0–1	0–1	Millwall do double
Nottingham Forest	2–2	3–2	
Peterborough United	2–0	1–2	
Sheffield Wednesday	0–1	2–0	
Watford	1–2	1–2	Watford do double
Wolverhampton Wanderers	2–1	1–2	

== Club statistics ==
All data from LCFC.com and FoxesTalk Stats

=== Appearances ===
Last updated on 16 May 2013

- Starts + Substitute appearances.
- Italics indicates loan player.
- Asterisks indicates player left mid-season.
- Hash symbol indicates player retired mid-season.

No.	Pos	Nat	Player	Total		Championship		Play-offs		FA Cup		League Cup	
No.	Pos	Nat	Player	Apps	Goals	Apps	Goals	Apps	Goals	Apps	Goals	Apps	Goals
1	GK	(Denmark) DEN	Kasper Schmeichel	53	0	46	0	2	0	3	0	2	0
2	DF	(Belgium) BEL	Ritchie De Laet	46	2	39+2	1	2	0	1	1	2	0
3	DF	(England) ENG	Paul Konchesky	44	1	39	1	0	0	3	0	2	0
4	MF	(England) ENG	Danny Drinkwater	46	1	40+2	1	0+2	0	0+1	0	1	0
5	DF	(England) ENG	Wes Morgan	51	1	45	1	2	0	3	0	1	0
6	DF	(United States) USA	Zak Whitbread	17	1	14+2	1	0	0	0	0	1	0
7	MF	(England) ENG	Ben Marshall	43	5	24+16	4	0	0	2	0	1	1
8	MF	(England) ENG	Neil Danns	3	0	0+1	0	0	0	0	0	1+1	0
9	FW	(England) ENG	Jamie Vardy	29	5	17+9	4	0	0	1+1	0	1	1
10	MF	(Wales) WAL	Andy King	48	7	35+7	7	2	0	2	0	0+2	0
11	MF	(England) ENG	Lloyd Dyer	48	4	27+15	3	2	0	2+1	0	1	1
12	DF	(Republic of Ireland) IRL	Sean St Ledger	10	0	8+1	0	0	0	0	0	1	0
13	GK	(Republic of Ireland) IRL	Conrad Logan	0	0	0	0	0	0	0	0	0	0
14	FW	(England) ENG	Martyn Waghorn	28	3	9+15	3	0	0	1+2	0	1	0
15	DF	(England) ENG	Michael Keane	27	3	22	2	2	0	3	1	0	0
16	MF	(England) ENG	Matty James	30	4	20+4	3	2	0	2	0	2	1
17	FW	(Scotland) SCO	Paul Gallagher	10	0	0+8	0	0	0	1	0	1	0
18	FW	(Ghana) GHA	Jeffrey Schlupp	22	3	13+6	3	2	0	0	0	1	0
19	MF	(England) ENG	Richie Wellens	4	0	2	0	0	0	2	0	0	0
20	FW	(Jamaica) JAM	Jermaine Beckford	5	0	2+2	0	0	0	0	0	1	0
21	FW	(England) ENG	Tom Hopper	0	0	0	0	0	0	0	0	0	0
22	DF	(England) ENG	Liam Moore	17	0	10+6	0	0	0	0	0	1	0
23	DF	(England) ENG	Tom Kennedy*	0	0	0	0	0	0	0	0	0	0
23	MF	(England) ENG	Jesse Lingard*	4	0	0+4	0	0	0	0	0	0	0
24	MF	(France) FRA	Anthony Knockaert	47	9	32+10	8	2	0	1+1	0	1	1
29	FW	(Hungary) HUN	Márkó Futács	12	2	0+9	1	0	0	2	0	0+1	1
35	FW	(England) ENG	David Nugent	49	16	36+6	14	2	2	1+2	0	0+2	0
37	FW	(England) ENG	Harry Kane	15	2	5+8	2	0+2	0	0	0	0	0
39	FW	(New Zealand) NZL	Chris Wood	24	11	19+1	9	2	0	1+1	2	0	0

=== Top scorers ===
Pos.	Nat.	Name	League	Play-offs	FA Cup	League Cup	Total
1	(England)	David Nugent	14	2	0	0	16
2	(New Zealand)	Chris Wood	9	0	2	0	11
3	(France)	Anthony Knockaert	8	0	0	1	9
4	(Wales)	Andy King	7	0	0	0	7
5	(England)	Ben Marshall	4	0	0	1	5
=	(England)	Jamie Vardy	4	0	0	1	5
7	(England)	Lloyd Dyer	3	0	0	1	4
=	(England)	Matty James	3	0	0	1	4
9	(Ghana)	Jeffrey Schlupp	3	0	0	0	3
=	(England)	Martyn Waghorn	3	0	0	0	3
=	(England)	Michael Keane	2	0	1	0	3
12	(England)	Harry Kane	2	0	0	0	2
=	(Belgium)	Ritchie De Laet	1	0	1	0	2
=	(Hungary)	Márkó Futács	1	0	0	1	2
15	(England)	Danny Drinkwater	1	0	0	0	1
=	(England)	Paul Konchesky	1	0	0	0	1
=	(England)	Wes Morgan	1	0	0	0	1
=	(United States)	Zak Whitbread	1	0	0	0	1
Own goals			2	0	0	0	2
Total			71	2	4	6	83

=== Disciplinary record ===
Last Updated: 16 May 2012

Nation	Name	Yellow card	Red card
(United States)	Zak Whitbread	4	1
(England)	Wes Morgan	4	1
(England)	David Nugent	9	0
(Belgium)	Ritchie De Laet	8	0
(France)	Anthony Knockaert	7	0
(England)	Michael Keane	5	0
(England)	Ben Marshall	5	0
(Ghana)	Jeffrey Schlupp	3	0
(England)	Danny Drinkwater	2	0
(England)	Lloyd Dyer	2	0
(England)	Paul Konchesky	2	0
(Republic of Ireland)	Sean St Ledger	2	0
(Hungary)	Márkó Futács	1	0
(Scotland)	Paul Gallagher	1	0
(England)	Matty James	1	0
(Wales)	Andy King	1	0
(England)	Liam Moore	1	0
(England)	Jamie Vardy	1	0
(England)	Martyn Waghorn	1	0
(New Zealand)	Chris Wood	1	0
Totals		61	2

=== Captains ===
- Only counts starts as captain

No.	Position	Nation	Name	Starts
5	CB	(England)	Wes Morgan	51
1	GK	(Denmark)	Kasper Schmeichel	2

=== Suspensions ===
Date Incurred	Nation	Name	Games Missed	Reason
27 October 2012	(Belgium)	Ritchie De Laet	1	Yellow card
3 November 2012	(United States)	Zak Whitbread	1	(yellow card) (yellow-red card) (vs. Watford)
29 March 2013	(England)	Wes Morgan	1	(red card) (vs. Millwall)

=== Penalties ===
Date	Nation	Name	Opposition	Scored?
1 September 2012	(England)	Ben Marshall	Blackpool	✓
17 November 2012	(England)	David Nugent	Ipswich Town	✓
23 February 2013	(New Zealand)	Chris Wood	Blackpool	✗
16 April 2013	(New Zealand)	Chris Wood	Bolton Wanderers	✓
12 May 2013	(France)	Anthony Knockaert	Watford	✗

=== Overall seasonal record ===
Note: Games which are level after extra-time and are decided by a penalty shoot-out are listed as draws.

Games played	53 (46 Championship, 2 Play-offs, 3 FA Cup, 2 League Cup)
Games won	22 (19 Championship, 1 Play-offs, 1 FA Cup, 1 League Cup)
Games drawn	12 (11 Championship, 0 Play-offs, 1 FA Cup, 0 League Cup)
Games lost	19 (16 Championship, 1 Play-offs, 1 FA Cup, 1 League Cup)
Win %	41.511%
Goals scored	83 (71 Championship, 2 Play-offs, 4 FA Cup, 6 League Cup)
Goals conceded	58 (48 Championship, 3 Play-offs, 3 FA Cup, 4 League Cup)
Goal difference	+25 (+23 Championship, −1 Play-offs, +1 FA Cup, +2 League Cup)
Yellow cards	61 (52 Championship, 5 Play-offs, 4 FA Cup, 0 League Cup)
Red cards	2 (2 Championship, 0 Play-offs, 0 FA Cup, 0 League Cup)
Worst discipline	David Nugent (9 yellows, 0 reds)
Biggest win	6–0 (vs. Ipswich Town, Championship 17.11.2012)
Heaviest defeat	2–4 (vs. Burton Albion, League Cup 28.8.2012) & 0–2 (vs. Barnsley, Championship 1.4.2013) & 1–3 (vs. Watford, Play-offs 12.5.2013)
Highest scoring match	6–1 (vs. Huddersfield Town, Championship 1.1.2013)
Most appearances	53 Kasper Schmeichel)
Top scorer	16 (David Nugent)
Most assists	9 (Ben Marshall)
