= 2014–15 Leicester City F.C. season =

110th season in existence of Leicester City

Leicester City
2014–15 season
- Chairman: Vichai Srivaddhanaprabha
- Manager: Nigel Pearson
- Stadium: King Power Stadium
- Premier League: 14th
- FA Cup: Fifth round
- League Cup: Second round
- Top goalscorer: League: Leonardo Ulloa (11); All: Leonardo Ulloa (13)
- Highest home attendance: 32,021 (vs. Chelsea, 29 April 2015)
- Lowest home attendance: 31,121 (vs. Swansea City, 18 April 2015)
Home colours	Away colours	Third colours

The 2014–15 season was Leicester City F.C.'s 110th season in the English football league system and their 47th (non-consecutive) season in the top tier of English football. They participated in the 2014–15 Premier League, their first time in Premier League in ten years, having been promoted from the Championship as champions. They also participated in the 2014–15 FA Cup and 2014–15 Football League Cup.

The season saw Leicester finish 14th in the Premier League, securing another top flight season. Despite the club being marooned at the bottom of the table for four-and-a-half months between late November and mid-April, the Foxes managed to put together a run of seven wins from their last nine fixtures to survive comfortably.

== Pre-season events ==
Note: This section does not include close season transfers or pre-season match results, which are listed in their own sections below.

- 2 July 2014 – Matty James signs a four-year contract extension until the summer of 2018.
- 4 July 2014 – Wes Morgan signs a three-year contract extension until the summer of 2017.
- 9 July 2014 – David Nugent signs a two-year contract extension until the summer of 2016.
- 11 July 2014 – Alie Sesay signs a one-year contract extension until the summer of 2015.
- 11 July 2014 – Liam Moore signs a three-year contract extension until the summer of 2017.
- 11 July 2014 – Jeff Schlupp signs a three-year contract extension until the summer of 2017.

== Kit and sponsorship ==
- Kit Supplier – Puma
- Sponsor – King Power

== Friendlies ==
Win Draw Loss Postponed

22 July 2014	Ilkeston	1–6	Leicester City	Ilkeston, England
19:30 BST	Johnson 90'		Morgan 33'; Wood 44'; Nugent 46', 79'; Hopper 54'; Wilson 89' (o.g.)	Stadium: New Manor Ground

27 July 2014	Leicester City	1–0	Everton	Bangkok, Thailand
12:50 BST	Taylor-Fletcher 54'	Report		Stadium: Supachalasai Stadium

30 July 2014	Walsall	2–3	Leicester City	Walsall, England
19:30 BST	Trialist 45'; Grimes 49'	Report	Morgan 7'; Nugent 26'; Drinkwater 87'	Stadium: Banks's Stadium; Attendance: 2,119; Referee: Stephen Martin

2 August 2014	Preston North End	1–1	Leicester City	Preston, England
15:00 BST	Clarke 58'	Report	Moore 25'	Stadium: Deepdale; Referee: Darren Handley

4 August 2014	Milton Keynes Dons	0–2	Leicester City	Milton Keynes, England
19:45 BST		Report	Nugent 24'; Pearson 68'	Stadium: Stadium MK; Attendance: 4,332; Referee: Gavin Ward

5 August 2014	Rotherham United	1–3	Leicester City	Rotherham, England
19:45 BST	Agard 59'	Report	Ulloa 29', 38'; Drinkwater 64'	Stadium: New York Stadium; Attendance: 3,714; Referee: Carl Pawson

9 August 2014	Leicester City	1–0	Werder Bremen	Leicester, England
15:00 BST	Morgan 7'	Report		Stadium: King Power Stadium; Attendance: 8,314

2 September 2014	Milton Keynes Dons	0–4	Leicester City	Milton Keynes
19:30 BST		Report	Drinkwater 35'; Hopper 74'; Cambiasso 78'; Albrighton 79'	Stadium: Stadium mk

== Events ==
Note:This section does not include transfers or match results, which are listed in their own sections below.

- 11 July 2014 – Jamie Vardy signs a four-year contract extension until the summer of 2018.
- 29 October 2014 – Andy King signs a four-year contract extension until the summer of 2018.
- 4 June 2015 – Marcin Wasilewski signs a one-year contract extension until the summer of 2016.
- 29 June 2015 – Jeff Schlupp signs a four-year contract extension until the summer of 2019.

== Players and staff ==
=== 2014–15 squad ===
- This section lists players who were in Leicester's first team squad at any point during the 2014–15 season
- Asterisks indicates player left mid-season
- Hash symbol indicates player retired mid-season
- Italics indicate loan player

No.	Nationality	Name	Position	Joined	Signed from
Goalkeepers
1	(Denmark)	Kasper Schmeichel	GK	2011	(England) Leeds United
12	(England)	Ben Hamer	GK	2014	(England) Charlton Athletic
25	(Republic of Ireland)	Conrad Logan	GK	2004	Youth
31	(England)	Adam Smith	GK	2010	(England) Middlesbrough
32	(Australia)	Mark Schwarzer	GK	2015	(England) Chelsea
Defenders
2	(Belgium)	Ritchie De Laet	RB / CB	2012	(England) Manchester United
3	(England)	Paul Konchesky	LB	2011	(England) Liverpool
5	(Jamaica)	Wes Morgan	CB	2012	(England) Nottingham Forest
6	(England)	Matthew Upson	CB	2014	(England) Brighton & Hove Albion
14	(Germany)	Robert Huth	CB	2015	(England) Stoke City
17	(England)	Danny Simpson	RB	2014	(England) Queens Park Rangers
18	(England)	Liam Moore	CB / RB	2011	Youth
21	(Ivory Coast)	Zoumana Bakayogo	LB / LM	2013	(England) Tranmere Rovers
27	(Poland)	Marcin Wasilewski	CB / RB	2013	Unattached
30	(England)	James Pearson	RB	2012	Unattached
Midfielders
4	(England)	Danny Drinkwater	CM	2012	(England) Manchester United
7	(England)	Dean Hammond	CM	2013	(England) Southampton
8	(England)	Matty James	CM	2012	(England) Manchester United
10	(Wales)	Andy King	CM	2006	Youth
11	(England)	Marc Albrighton	RM	2014	(England) Aston Villa
15	(Ghana)	Jeff Schlupp	LW / LM / LB / CF	2010	Youth
16	(Wales)	Tom Lawrence	LW	2014	(England) Manchester United
19	(Argentina)	Esteban Cambiasso	DM / CB	2014	Unattached
24	(France)	Anthony Knockaert	AM / LW / RW	2012	(France) Guingamp
26	(Algeria)	Riyad Mahrez	LW / RW / AM	2014	(France) Le Havre
33	(England)	Michael Cain	CM	2011	(England) Luton Town
44	(England)	Ryan Watson	CM	2013	(England) Wigan Athletic
Forwards
9	(England)	Jamie Vardy	CF / LW	2012	(England) Fleetwood Town
14	(England)	Nick Powell*	CF / CM	2014	(England) Manchester United
20	(England)	Tom Hopper	CF	2011	Youth
22	(England)	Gary Taylor-Fletcher	CF / AM / LW / RW / CM	2013	(England) Blackpool
23	(Argentina)	Leonardo Ulloa	CF	2014	(England) Brighton & Hove Albion
29	(England)	Jack Barmby	CF / LW	2014	(England) Manchester United
35	(England)	David Nugent	CF / LW	2011	(England) Portsmouth
39	(New Zealand)	Chris Wood	CF	2013	(England) West Bromwich Albion
40	(Croatia)	Andrej Kramarić	CF	2015	(Croatia) Rijeka

=== 2014–15 backroom staff ===
- This section lists members of staff who were in Leicester's first team squad at any point during the 2014–15 season
- Asterisks indicate member of staff left mid-season

Position	Nationality	Name
Manager	(England)	Nigel Pearson
Assistant manager	(England)	Craig Shakespeare
Assistant manager/Head of Recruitment	(England)	Steve Walsh
First Team Coach/Goalkeeping Coach	(England)	Mike Stowell
Forwards/Strikers Coach	(England)	Kevin Phillips
Head physio	(England)	David Rennie
Academy manager	(England)	Jon Rudkin
Academy coach (Under 18s)	(England)	Steve Beaglehole
Academy coach (Under 16s)	(England)	Trevor Peake

== Transfers ==
=== In ===
Date	Position	Nationality	Name	From	Fee
1 July 2014	RM	(England)	Marc Albrighton	(England) Aston Villa	Free
1 July 2014	CB	(England)	Matthew Upson	(England) Brighton & Hove Albion	Free
1 July 2014	GK	(England)	Ben Hamer	(England) Charlton Athletic	Free
1 July 2014	CF	(England)	Jack Barmby	(England) Manchester United	Free
18 July 2014	CB	(England)	Louis Rowley	(England) Manchester United	Free
22 July 2014	CF	(Argentina)	Leonardo Ulloa	(England) Brighton & Hove Albion	£8 million
28 August 2014	CM	(Argentina)	Esteban Cambiasso	Free agent	Free
30 August 2014	RB	(England)	Danny Simpson	(England) Queens Park Rangers	£2 million
31 August 2014	CF	(Wales)	Tom Lawrence	(England) Manchester United	£1 million
6 January 2015	GK	(Australia)	Mark Schwarzer	(England) Chelsea	Free
16 January 2015	CF	(Croatia)	Andrej Kramarić	(Croatia) Rijeka	£9 million

=== Loans in ===
Date from	Date to	Position	Nationality	Name	From
31 August 2014	2 January 2015	CF	(England)	Nick Powell	(England) Manchester United
2 February 2015	30 June 2015	CB	(Germany)	Robert Huth	(England) Stoke City

=== Loans out ===
Date from	Date to	Position	Nationality	Name	To
5 July 2014	30 June 2015	AM	(Scotland)	Paul Gallagher	(England) Preston North End
7 August 2014	4 September 2014	RW	(England)	Adam Dawson	(England) Notts County
18 August 2014	1 January 2015	GK	(Republic of Ireland)	Conrad Logan	(England) Rochdale
27 August 2014	30 June 2015	ST	(England)	Jacob Blyth	(England) Burton Albion
1 September 2014	2 January 2015	CM	(England)	Ryan Watson	(England) Northampton Town
3 October 2014	31 October 2014	RW	(England)	Adam Dawson	(England) Nuneaton Town
20 October 2014	30 June 2015	CM	(England)	Michael Cain	(England) Walsall
20 October 2014	17 November 2014	ST	(Saint Kitts and Nevis)	Harry Panayiotou	(England) Port Vale
25 October 2014	22 November 2014	ST	(England)	Gary Taylor-Fletcher	(England) Sheffield Wednesday
25 November 2014	22 January 2015	ST	(Lithuania)	Simonas Stankevičius	(England) Nuneaton Town
27 November 2014	30 December 2014	CM	(Wales)	Tom Lawrence	(England) Rotherham United
8 January 2015	30 June 2015	RM/LM	(England)	Jack Barmby	(England) Rotherham United
8 January 2015	30 June 2015	ST	(England)	Tom Hopper	(England) Scunthorpe United
8 January 2015	11 April 2015	LB	(Australia)	Callum Elder	(England) Mansfield Town
9 January 2015	7 February 2015	GK	(England)	Adam Smith	(England) Mansfield Town
13 January 2015	18 April 2015	RW	(England)	Adam Dawson	(England) Bristol Rovers
30 January 2015	30 April 2015	CB	(France)	Hervé Pepe-Ngoma	(England) Corby Town
20 February 2015	30 June 2015	ST	(England)	Gary Taylor-Fletcher	(England) Millwall
26 February 2015	30 June 2015	CB	(England)	Liam Moore	(England) Brentford
27 February 2015	30 June 2015	ST	(New Zealand)	Chris Wood	(England) Ipswich Town
14 March 2015	30 June 2015	GK	(England)	Jonny Maddison	(England) Leamington
26 March 2015	30 June 2015	DF	(England)	James Pearson	(England) Peterborough United

=== Released ===
Date	Position	Nationality	Name
1 July 2014	CB	(Republic of Ireland)	Sean St Ledger
1 July 2014	CB	(United States)	Zak Whitbread
1 July 2014	CB	(England)	George Taft
1 July 2014	RB	(England)	Jamie Anton
1 July 2014	CB	(England)	Ben Frempah
1 July 2014	CM	(Australia)	Robert Paratore
1 July 2014	CM	(England)	Neil Danns
1 July 2014	LW	(England)	Lloyd Dyer
17 June 2015	GK	(England)	Adam Smith
17 June 2015	DF	(England)	James Pearson
17 June 2015	FW	(England)	Tom Hopper

== Competitions ==
=== Premier League ===
Competition	First match	Last match	Starting round	Final position	Record							
Competition	First match	Last match	Starting round	Final position	Pld	W	D	L	GF	GA	GD	Win %
Premier League	16 August 2014	24 May 2015	Matchday 1	14th	38	11	8	19	46	55	−9	28.95
FA Cup	3 January 2015	15 February 2015	Third round	Fifth round	3	2	0	1	4	3	+1	66.67
League Cup	26 August 2014		Second round	Second round	1	0	0	1	0	1	−1	0.00
Total					42	13	8	21	50	59	−9	30.95

Source: Competitions

==== League table ====
Pos	Team	Pld	W	D	L	GF	GA	GD	Pts	Qualification or relegation
12	West Ham United	38	12	11	15	44	47	−3	47	Qualification for the Europa League first qualifying round (Note: England was given an extra qualification berth for the Europa League first qualifying round as one of the top three associations in UEFA Respect Fair Play ranking. The spot was given to West Ham United after finishing on top of the Premier League Fair Play table.)
13	West Bromwich Albion	38	11	11	16	38	51	−13	44	
14	Leicester City	38	11	8	19	46	55	−9	41	
15	Newcastle United	38	10	9	19	40	63	−23	39	
16	Sunderland	38	7	17	14	31	53	−22	38	

Source: Barclays Premier League
Rules for classification: 1) Points; 2) Goal difference; 3) Goals scored; 4) Play-offs (only if needed to decide champion, teams for relegation or teams for UEFA competitions).

==== Results summary ====
Overall								Home						Away					
Pld	W	D	L	GF	GA	GD	Pts	W	D	L	GF	GA	GD	W	D	L	GF	GA	GD
38	11	8	19	46	55	−9	41	7	5	7	28	22	+6	4	3	12	18	33	−15

Last updated: 17 May 2015.
Source: Premier League

==== Results by matchday ====
Matchday	1	2	3	4	5	6	7	8	9	10	11	12	13	14	15	16	17	18	19	20	21	22	23	24	25	26	27	28	29	30	31	32	33	34	35	36	37	38
Ground	H	A	H	A	H	A	H	A	A	H	A	H	A	H	A	H	A	H	A	A	H	H	A	H	A	A	A	H	A	H	A	H	A	H	H	H	A	H
Result	D	L	D	W	W	L	D	L	L	L	L	D	L	L	L	L	L	L	W	D	W	L	L	L	L	D	L	D	L	W	W	W	W	L	W	W	D	W
Position	6	14	15	10	7	10	9	13	16	16	18	17	20	20	20	20	20	20	20	20	20	20	20	20	20	20	20	20	20	20	20	18	17	17	16	15	14	14

Updated to match(es) played on 17 May 2015. Source: Statto.com
A = Away; H = Home; W = Win; D = Draw; L = Loss

==== Matches ====
The fixtures for the 2014–15 season were announced on 18 June 2014 at 9am.

Win Draw Loss Postponed

16 August 2014 1	Leicester City	2–2	Everton	Leicester
15:00 BST	Ulloa 22'; Moore (yellow card) 71'; Wood 86'	Report	McGeady 20'; Naismith 45'; Barry (yellow card) 68'	Stadium: King Power Stadium; Attendance: 31,603; Referee: Mike Jones

23 August 2014 2	Chelsea	2–0	Leicester City	Fulham, London
15:00 BST	Costa 63'; Hazard 77'	Report	Hammond (yellow card) 51'	Stadium: Stamford Bridge; Attendance: 41,604; Referee: Lee Mason

31 August 2014 3	Leicester City	1–1	Arsenal	Leicester
16:00 BST	Ulloa 23'; Albrighton (yellow card) 84'; Hammond (yellow card) 85'; Moore (yellow card) 90'	Report	Sánchez 20'; Szczęsny (yellow card) 90'	Stadium: King Power Stadium; Attendance: 31,535; Referee: Anthony Taylor

13 September 2014 4	Stoke City	0–1	Leicester City	Stoke-on-Trent
15:00 BST	Crouch (yellow card) 29'; Pieters (yellow card) 49'; Whelan (yellow card) 64'	Report	Ulloa 64'	Stadium: Britannia Stadium; Attendance: 27,500; Referee: Michael Oliver

21 September 2014 5	Leicester City	5–3	Manchester United	Leicester
13:30 BST	Ulloa 17', 83' (pen.); De Laet (yellow card) 33'; Nugent 62' (pen.); Cambiasso 64'; Vardy 79'	Report	Van Persie 13'; Di María 16'; Herrera 57'; Blackett (red card) 83'; Rooney (yellow card) 83'	Stadium: King Power Stadium; Attendance: 31,784; Referee: Mark Clattenburg

27 September 2014 6	Crystal Palace	2–0	Leicester City	London
15:00 BST	Campbell 51'; Jedinak 54'	Report	Simpson (yellow card) 85'; Vardy (yellow card) 90+5'	Stadium: Selhurst Park; Attendance: 24,311; Referee: Keith Stroud

4 October 2014 7	Leicester City	2–2	Burnley	Leicester
15:00 BST	Schlupp 33'; Mahrez 40'	Report	Kightly 39'; Wallace 90+4'	Stadium: King Power Stadium; Attendance: 31,448; Referee: Phil Dowd

18 October 2014 8	Newcastle United	1–0	Leicester City	Newcastle upon Tyne
16:00 BST	Obertan 71'	Report	Moore (yellow card) 22'; De Laet (yellow card) 28'; Ulloa (yellow card) 34'	Stadium: St James' Park; Attendance: 51,886; Referee: Martin Atkinson

25 October 2014 9	Swansea City	2–0	Leicester City	Swansea
17:30 BST	Bony 34', 57'	Report		Stadium: Liberty Stadium; Attendance: 20,259; Referee: Mike Jones

1 November 2014 10	Leicester City	0–1	West Bromwich Albion	Leicester
15:00 BST		Report	Cambiasso 47' (o.g.); Gardner (yellow card) 87'	Stadium: King Power Stadium; Attendance: 31,819; Referee: Stuart Attwell

8 November 2014 11	Southampton	2–0	Leicester City	Southampton
15:00 BST	Schneiderlin (yellow card) 37'; Alderweireld (yellow card) 54'; Long 75', 80'	Report	Moore (yellow card) 58'; Wasilewski (yellow card) 78'	Stadium: St Mary's Stadium; Attendance: 31,297; Referee: Michael Oliver

22 November 2014 12	Leicester City	0–0	Sunderland	Leicester
15:00 BST	Vardy (yellow card) 53'; De Laet (yellow card) 85'	Report	(yellow card) 42' Larsson; (yellow card) 61' Cattermole; (yellow card) 68' Fletcher	Stadium: King Power Stadium; Attendance: 31,825; Referee: Bobby Madley

29 November 2014 13	Queens Park Rangers	3–2	Leicester City	London
15:00 GMT	Morgan 37' (o.g.); Yun (yellow card) 44'; Fer 45'; Austin 73', (yellow card) 77'; Green (yellow card) 90+4'	Report	4' Cambiasso; 67' Schlupp; Nugent (yellow card) 90+2'; Albrighton (yellow card) 90+4'	Stadium: Loftus Road; Attendance: 18,054; Referee: Roger East

2 December 2014 14	Leicester City	1–3	Liverpool	Leicester
19:45 GMT	Mignolet 21' (o.g.); Morgan (red card) 63'; Schlupp (yellow card) 75'	Report	26', (yellow card) 38' Lallana; 54', (yellow card) 65' Gerrard; 83' Henderson	Stadium: King Power Stadium; Attendance: 32,000; Referee: Lee Mason

7 December 2014 15	Aston Villa	2–1	Leicester City	Birmingham
16:00 GMT	Clark 17'; N'Zogbia (yellow card) 34'; Hutton 71', (yellow card) 81'; Sánchez (yellow card) 74'; Agbonlahor (yellow card) 90'	Report	13' Ulloa; (yellow card) 41' Vardy; (yellow card) 59' Cambiasso; (yellow card) 60' Schlupp; (yellow card) 71' Wasilewski; (red card) 80' Konchesky	Stadium: Villa Park; Attendance: 27,692; Referee: Craig Pawson

13 December 2014 16	Leicester City	0–1	Manchester City	Leicester
15:00 GMT		Report	40' Lampard; (yellow card) 70' Nasri; (yellow card) 78' Hart	Stadium: King Power Stadium; Attendance: 31,643; Referee: Jonathan Moss

20 December 2014 17	West Ham United	2–0	Leicester City	London
15:00 GMT	Carroll 24'; Downing 56'	Report	(yellow card) 33' King; (yellow card) 41' Vardy; (yellow card) 64' Ulloa	Stadium: Upton Park; Attendance: 34,977; Referee: Martin Atkinson

26 December 2014 18	Leicester City	1–2	Tottenham Hotspur	Leicester
15:00 GMT	Ulloa 48'; Vardy (yellow card) 90+2'	Report	1' Kane; (yellow card) 35' Walker; 73' Eriksen; (yellow card) 82' Vertonghen	Stadium: King Power Stadium; Attendance: 31,780; Referee: Neil Swarbrick

28 December 2014 19	Hull City	0–1	Leicester City	Kingston upon Hull
15:00 GMT	Qunn (red card) 90+4'	Report	(yellow card) 31' Simpson; 32' Mahrez; (yellow card) 58' (yellow-red card) 88' Konchesky	Stadium: KC Stadium; Attendance: 23,780; Referee: Phil Dowd

1 January 2015 20	Liverpool	2–2	Leicester City	Liverpool
15:00 GMT	Gerrard 17' (pen.), 40' (pen.)	Report	Nugent 58'; Schlupp 60'	Stadium: Anfield; Attendance: 44,720; Referee: Mike Jones

10 January 2015 21	Leicester City	1–0	Aston Villa	Leicester
15:00 GMT	Konchesky 45'	Report		Stadium: King Power Stadium; Attendance: 31,728; Referee: Michael Oliver

17 January 2015 22	Leicester City	0–1	Stoke City	Leicester
15:00 GMT	Wasilewski (yellow card) 19'	Report	Bojan 63'	Stadium: King Power Stadium; Attendance: 31,772; Referee: Andre Marriner

31 January 2015 23	Manchester United	3–1	Leicester City	Manchester
15:00 GMT	Van Persie 27'; Falcao 32'; Morgan 44' (o.g.)	Report	Drinkwater (yellow card) 34'; Wasilewski 80'	Stadium: Old Trafford; Attendance: 75,329; Referee: Martin Atkinson

7 February 2015 24	Leicester City	0–1	Crystal Palace	Leicester
15:00 GMT	Schlupp (yellow card) 9'; Simpson (yellow card) 32'; Ulloa (yellow card) 79'; Konchesky (yellow card) 90+4'	Report	Ledley 55'; Kelly (yellow card) 82'	Stadium: King Power Stadium; Attendance: 31,695; Referee: Lee Mason

11 February 2015 25	Arsenal	2–1	Leicester City	London
19:45 GMT	Koscielny 27'; Walcott 41'	Report	Kramarić 62'	Stadium: Emirates Stadium; Attendance: 60,032; Referee: Mike Jones

22 February 2015 26	Everton	2–2	Leicester City	Liverpool
14:05 GMT	Naismith 57'; Upson 88' (o.g.)	Report	Morgan (yellow card) 25'; Nugent 63'; Cambiasso 70'	Stadium: Goodison Park; Attendance: 38,904; Referee: Phil Dowd

4 March 2015 27	Manchester City	2–0	Leicester City	Manchester
19:45 GMT	Silva 45+2'; Milner 88'	Report	Konchesky (yellow card) 36'	Stadium: City of Manchester Stadium; Attendance: 45,000; Referee: Robert Madley

14 March 2015 28	Leicester City	0–0	Hull City	Leicester
15:00 GMT		Report	Huddlestone (yellow card) 14' (yellow-red card) 72'; Robertson (yellow card) 45'; Dawson (yellow card) 66'; Bruce (yellow card) 68'; N'Doye (yellow card) 85'	Stadium: King Power Stadium; Attendance: 31,456; Referee: Jonathan Moss

21 March 2015 29	Tottenham Hotspur	4–3	Leicester City	London
15:00 GMT	Kane 6', 13', 64' (pen.); Chadli (yellow card) 32'; Rose (yellow card) 78'; Sclupp 85' (o.g.)	Report	Vardy 38'; Nugent (yellow card) 48' (goal) 90'; Morgan 50'	Stadium: White Hart Lane; Attendance: 35,950; Referee: Mike Dean

4 April 2015 30	Leicester City	2–1	West Ham United	Leicester
15:00 BST	Cambiasso 12'; King 86'	Report	Kouyaté 32'; Jenkinson (yellow card) 14'; Reid (yellow card) 53'; Collins (yellow card) 61'; Cresswell (yellow card) 85'	Stadium: King Power Stadium; Attendance: 31,863; Referee: Mark Clattenburg

11 April 2015 31	West Bromwich Albion	2–3	Leicester City	West Bromwich
15:00 BST	Fletcher 8'; Gardner 26'	Report	Nugent 20'; Huth 80'; Vardy 90+1'	Stadium: The Hawthorns; Attendance: 26,768; Referee: Martin Atkinson

18 April 2015 32	Leicester City	2–0	Swansea City	Leicester
15:00 BST	Ulloa 15'; King 89'	Report		Stadium: King Power Stadium; Attendance: 31,121; Referee: Lee Probert

25 April 2015 33	Burnley	0–1	Leicester City	Burnley
15:00 BST	Mee (yellow card) 66'; Ings (yellow card) 73'; Wallace (yellow card) 85'	Report	Vardy 60'	Stadium: Turf Moor; Attendance: 19,582; Referee: Anthony Taylor

30 April 2015 34	Leicester City	1–3	Chelsea	Leicester
19:45 BST	Konchesky (yellow card) 36'; Albrighton 45+3'	Report	Drogba 48'; Terry 79'; Ramires 83'	Stadium: King Power Stadium; Attendance: 32,021; Referee: Mark Clattenburg

2 May 2015 35	Leicester City	3–0	Newcastle United	Leicester
12:45 BST	Ulloa 1', 48' (pen.); Morgan 17'; James (yellow card) 29'	Report	Janmaat (yellow card) 16' (yellow-red card) 90+1'; Gutiérrez (yellow card) 28'; Williamson (yellow card) 55' (yellow-red card) 62'; Dummett (yellow card) 70'	Stadium: King Power Stadium; Attendance: 31,576; Referee: Mike Dean

9 May 2015 36	Leicester City	2–0	Southampton	Leicester
15:00 BST	Mahrez 7', 19'; Wasilewski (yellow card) 81'	Report		Stadium: King Power Stadium; Attendance: 31,939; Referee: Roger East

16 May 2015 37	Sunderland	0–0	Leicester City	Sunderland
15:00 BST		Report		Stadium: Stadium of Light; Attendance: 46,705; Referee: Martin Atkinson

24 May 2015 38	Leicester City	5–1	Queens Park Rangers	Leicester
15:00 BST	Vardy 16'; Albrighton 43'; Ulloa 51'; Cambiasso 52'; Kramarić 86'	Report	Austin 57'	Stadium: King Power Stadium; Attendance: 31,467; Referee: Michael Oliver

=== FA Cup ===
Win Draw Loss Postponed

3 January 2015 Third	Leicester City	1–0	Newcastle United	Leicester
15:00 GMT	Ulloa 39'	Report		Stadium: King Power Stadium; Attendance: 23,212; Referee: Lee Mason

24 January 2015 Fourth	Tottenham Hotspur	1–2	Leicester City	Tottenham
15:00 GMT	Townsend 19' (pen.)	Report	Ulloa 83'; Schlupp 90+2'	Stadium: White Hart Lane; Attendance: 35,548; Referee: Robert Madley

15 February 2015 Fifth	Aston Villa	2–1	Leicester City	Birmingham
12:30 GMT	Bacuna 68'; Sinclair 89'	Report	Konchesky (yellow card) 60'; Kramarić 90+1'; Simpson (yellow card) 90+2'	Stadium: Villa Park; Attendance: 28,098; Referee: Mark Clattenburg

=== Football League Cup ===
As a Premier League club not participating in European club competitions, Leicester City entered the 2014–15 League Cup in the second round. The Foxes were drawn at home against Shrewsbury Town, with the game being played on 26 August. Leicester's League Cup campaign was short-lived as the League Two side recorded a shock 1–0 victory.

Win Draw Loss Postponed

26 August 2014 Second	Leicester City	0–1	Shrewsbury Town	Leicester
19:45 BST		Report	Mangan 38'	Stadium: King Power Stadium; Attendance: 8,017; Referee: Simon Hooper

== Awards ==
=== Club awards ===
At the end of the season, Leicester's annual award ceremony, including categories voted for by the players and backroom staff, the supporters and the supporters club, saw the following players recognised for their achievements for the club throughout the 2014–15 season.

Player of the Year Award	(Argentina) Esteban Cambiasso
Young Player of the Year Award	(Ghana) Jeff Schlupp
Players' Player of the Year Award	(Ghana) Jeff Schlupp
Academy Player of the year Award	(England) Ben Chilwell
Under-21 Player of the year Award	(Saint Kitts and Nevis) Harry Panayiotou
Goal of the Season Award	(England) David Nugent vs. Liverpool, 1 January 2015
Performance of the Season	vs. Manchester United, 21 September 2014

=== Divisional awards ===
Date	Nation	Winner	Award
April 2015	(England)	Nigel Pearson	Premier League Manager of the Month

== Club statistics ==
All data from LCFC.com

=== Appearances ===
- Starts + Substitute appearances.
- Italics indicates loan player.
- Asterisks indicates player left mid-season.
- Hash symbol indicates player retired mid-season.

No.	Pos	Nat	Player	Total		Premier League		FA Cup		League Cup	
No.	Pos	Nat	Player	Apps	Goals	Apps	Goals	Apps	Goals	Apps	Goals
1	GK	(Denmark) DEN	Kasper Schmeichel	24	0	24	0	0	0	0	0
2	DF	(Belgium) BEL	Ritchie De Laet	28	0	20+6	0	2	0	0	0
3	DF	(England) ENG	Paul Konchesky	29	1	26	1	2	0	1	0
4	MF	(England) ENG	Danny Drinkwater	24	0	16+7	0	1	0	0	0
5	DF	(Jamaica) JAM	Wes Morgan	40	2	37	2	3	0	0	0
6	DF	(England) ENG	Matthew Upson	6	0	5	0	1	0	0	0
7	MF	(England) ENG	Dean Hammond	12	0	9+3	0	0	0	0	0
8	MF	(England) ENG	Matty James	29	0	20+7	0	2	0	0	0
9	FW	(England) ENG	Jamie Vardy	36	5	26+8	5	1+1	0	0	0
10	MF	(Wales) WAL	Andy King	26	2	16+8	2	1	0	0+1	0
11	MF	(England) ENG	Marc Albrighton	20	2	10+8	2	0+2	0	0	0
12	GK	(England) ENG	Ben Hamer	10	0	8	0	1	0	1	0
14	MF	(England) ENG	Nick Powell*	3	0	0+3	0	0	0	0	0
14	DF	(Germany) GER	Robert Huth	14	1	14	1	0	0	0	0
15	MF	(Ghana) GHA	Jeff Schlupp	35	4	30+2	3	2	1	0+1	0
16	MF	(Wales) WAL	Tom Lawrence	4	0	0+3	0	1	0	0	0
17	DF	(England) ENG	Danny Simpson	16	0	13+1	0	2	0	0	0
18	DF	(England) ENG	Liam Moore	14	0	10+1	0	2	0	1	0
19	MF	(Argentina) ARG	Esteban Cambiasso	33	5	27+4	5	2	0	0	0
20	FW	(England) ENG	Tom Hopper	0	0	0	0	0	0	0	0
21	DF	(Ivory Coast) CIV	Zoumana Bakayogo	0	0	0	0	0	0	0	0
22	FW	(England) ENG	Gary Taylor-Fletcher	2	0	0+1	0	0	0	1	0
23	FW	(Argentina) ARG	Leonardo Ulloa	40	13	29+8	11	2+1	2	0	0
24	MF	(France) FRA	Anthony Knockaert	11	0	3+6	0	1	0	1	0
25	GK	(Republic of Ireland) IRL	Conrad Logan	0	0	0	0	0	0	0	0
26	MF	(Algeria) ALG	Riyad Mahrez	32	4	25+5	4	1	0	1	0
27	DF	(Poland) POL	Marcin Wasilewski	28	1	22+3	1	1+1	0	1	0
29	MF	(England) ENG	Jack Barmby	0	0	0	0	0	0	0	0
30	DF	(England) ENG	James Pearson	1	0	0	0	0	0	1	0
31	GK	(England) ENG	Adam Smith	0	0	0	0	0	0	0	0
32	GK	(Australia) AUS	Mark Schwarzer	8	0	6	0	2	0	0	0
33	MF	(England) ENG	Michael Cain	1	0	0	0	0	0	1	0
35	FW	(England) ENG	David Nugent	32	5	16+13	5	1+1	0	0+1	0
39	FW	(New Zealand) NZL	Chris Wood	9	1	0+7	1	0+1	0	1	0
40	ST	(Croatia) CRO	Andrej Kramarić	15	3	6+7	2	2	1	0	0
44	MF	(England) ENG	Ryan Watson	1	0	0	0	0	0	1	0

=== Goalscorers ===
Pos.	Nat.	Name	League	FA Cup	League Cup	Total
1	(Argentina)	Leonardo Ulloa	11	2	0	13
2	(Argentina)	Esteban Cambiasso	5	0	0	5
2	(England)	David Nugent	5	0	0	5
2	(England)	Jamie Vardy	5	0	0	5
5	(Algeria)	Riyad Mahrez	4	0	0	4
5	(Ghana)	Jeff Schlupp	3	1	0	4
7	(Croatia)	Andrej Kramarić	2	1	0	3
8	(England)	Marc Albrighton	2	0	0	2
8	(Jamaica)	Wes Morgan	2	0	0	2
8	(Wales)	Andy King	2	0	0	2
11	(New Zealand)	Chris Wood	1	0	0	1
11	(England)	Paul Konchesky	1	0	0	1
11	(Poland)	Marcin Wasilewski	1	0	0	1
11	(Germany)	Robert Huth	1	0	0	1
Own goals			1	0	0	1
Total			46	4	0	50

=== Disciplinary record ===
Nation	Name	Yellow card	Red card
(England)	Paul Konchesky	4	2
(Poland)	Marcin Wasilewski	7	0
(England)	Jamie Vardy	6	0
(England)	Liam Moore	5	0
(England)	Danny Simpson	5	0
(England)	Matty James	2	1
(Argentina)	Leonardo Ulloa	4	0
(Ghana)	Jeff Schlupp	4	0
(Jamaica)	Wes Morgan	1	1
(England)	Dean Hammond	3	0
(Belgium)	Richie De Laet	3	0
(England)	Marc Albrighton	3	0
(England)	David Nugent	3	0
(Germany)	Robert Huth	2	0
(Argentina)	Esteban Cambiasso	1	0
(Wales)	Andy King	1	0
(Algeria)	Riyad Mahrez	1	0
(Wales)	Tom Lawrence	1	0
(Croatia)	Andrej Kramarić	1	0
(England)	Danny Drinkwater	1	0
Total		58	4

- Ranking based on 1 point for a yellow card and 3 points for a red card.

=== Captains ===
Last Updated: 26 May 2015

- Only counts starts as captain

No.	Position	Nation	Name	Starts
5	CB	(Jamaica)	Wes Morgan	40
1	GK	(Denmark)	Kasper Schmeichel	1
3	LB	(England)	Paul Konchesky	1

=== Suspensions ===
Date Incurred	Nation	Name	Games Missed	Reason
2 December 2014	(Jamaica)	Wes Morgan	1	(red card) (vs. Liverpool)
7 December 2014	(England)	Paul Konchesky	0*	(red card) (vs. Aston Villa)
26 December 2014	(England)	Jamie Vardy	1	Yellow card
28 December 2014	(England)	Paul Konchesky	1	(yellow card) (yellow-red card) (vs. Hull City)
10 January 2015	(England)	Matty James	3	(red card) (vs. Aston Villa)

- * Konchesky's red card vs. Aston Villa was rescinded on appeal.

=== Penalties ===
Date	Nation	Name	Opposition	Scored?
21 September 2014	(England)	David Nugent	Manchester United	✓
21 September 2014	(Argentina)	Leonardo Ulloa	Manchester United	✓
4 April 2015	(England)	David Nugent	West Ham United	✗
2 May 2015	(Argentina)	Leonardo Ulloa	Newcastle United	✓

=== Overall seasonal record ===
Note: Games which are level after extra-time and are decided by a penalty shoot-out are listed as draws.

Games played	42 (38 Premier League, 3 FA Cup, 1 League Cup)
Games won	13 (11 Premier League, 2 FA Cup, 0 League Cup)
Games drawn	8 (8 Premier League, 0 FA Cup, 0 League Cup)
Games lost	21 (19 Premier League, 1 FA Cup, 1 League Cup)
Win %	30.95%
Goals scored	50 (46 Premier League, 4 FA Cup, 0 League Cup)
Goals conceded	59 (55 Premier League, 3 FA Cup, 1 League Cup)
Goal difference	−9 (−9 Premier League, +1 FA Cup, −1 League Cup)
Yellow cards	58 (49 Premier League, 8 FA Cup, 1 League Cup)
Red cards	4 (4 Premier League, 0 FA Cup, 0 League Cup)
Worst discipline	Paul Konchesky (4 yellows, 2 reds)
Biggest win	5–1 (vs. Queens Park Rangers, Premier League, 24.05.2015)
Heaviest defeat	1–3 (on 3 occasions) 0–2 (on 6 occasions)
Highest scoring match	5–3 (vs. Manchester United, Premier League, 21.09.2014)
Most appearances	40 (Wes Morgan & Leonardo Ulloa)
Top scorer	13 (Leonardo Ulloa)
Most assists	8 (Jamie Vardy)
