= Jeffrey Schlupp =

German footballer (born 1992)

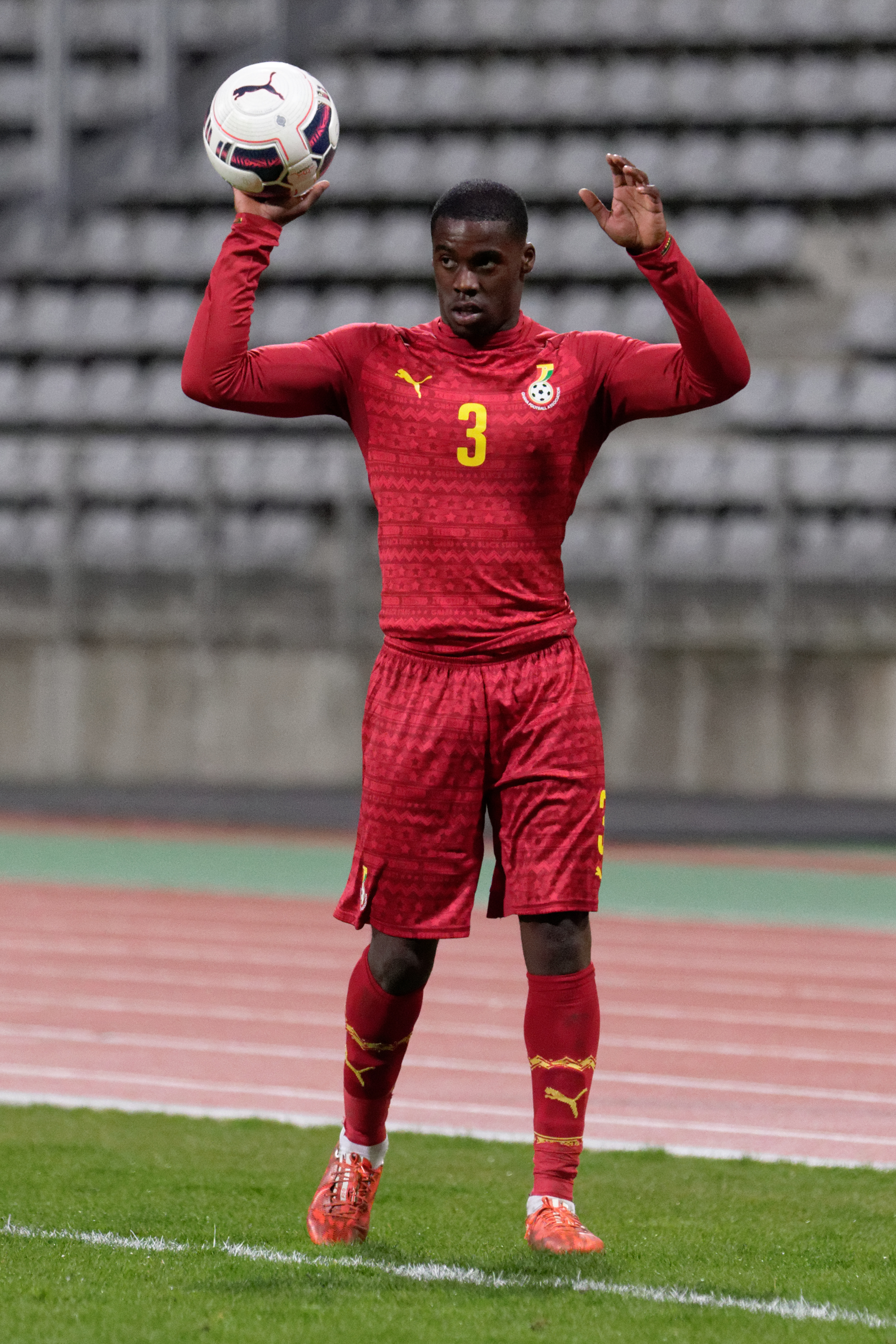
- Schlupp playing for Ghana in 2015

Personal information
- Full name: Jeffrey Schlupp
- Date of birth: 23 December 1992 (age 33)
- Place of birth: Hamburg, Germany
- Height: 1.78 m (5 ft 10 in)
- Positions: Left-back; left wing-back; central midfielder; left winger; forward

Youth career
- 2005–2010: Leicester City

Senior career*
Years	Team	Apps	(Gls)
2010–2017	Leicester City	123	(10)
2011	→ Brentford (loan)	9	(6)
2017–2025	Crystal Palace	220	(18)
2025	→ Celtic (loan)	13	(1)
2025–2026	Norwich City	9	(0)

International career
2011–2021	Ghana	20	(1)
- * Club domestic league appearances and goals as of 10:34, 9 November 2025 (UTC)

Jeffrey Schlupp (German pronunciation: [ˈdʒɛfʁi ˈʃlʊp]; born 23 December 1992) is a professional footballer. A versatile player, Schlupp has played as a left-back, central midfielder, left winger or forward in his career.

A product of the Leicester City academy, Schlupp made his senior debut in 2011 following a brief loan to Brentford in League One. He went on to make 150 appearances for the club, winning the EFL Championship in 2013–14 and the Premier League in 2015–16. In 2017, he was signed by Crystal Palace, for whom he made over 200 appearances.

Born in Germany, Schlupp previously represented the Ghana national team from 2011 to 2021, winning a total of 20 caps and scoring once, and made the 2015 Africa Cup of Nations (AFCON) squad.

== Early life ==
Schlupp was born to Ghanaian parents in Hamburg, Germany, on 23 December 1992, and raised mostly in England after his family moved there when he was young. He attended Stanton School in Bradville, Milton Keynes and Oakgrove School in Milton Keynes along with Millwall goalkeeper Max Crocombe.

== Club career ==
=== Leicester City ===
A product of the Leicester City youth academy, Schlupp was given a squad number, 31, for the first time for the 2010–11 season along with fellow academy players Tom Parkes and Jorrin John by then manager Paulo Sousa. Schlupp signed a new contract keeping him at the club until 2013 on 14 March 2011. Schlupp was named among the Leicester City substitutes for the first time by, then manager, Sven-Göran Eriksson in the 3–2 home defeat to Norwich City on 8 March 2011.

==== Loan to Brentford ====
Schlupp joined Brentford on a one-month loan on 14 March 2011, declining a call up to the Germany Under-19 squad in order to complete the move. He made his senior debut in a 1–0 defeat to Huddersfield Town coming on as a substitute on 77 minutes on 15 March 2011. On his first full senior appearance in his career he scored two goals winning the match against Carlisle United 2–1 on 25 March 2011. Schlupp earned a start in Brentford's next match and proved himself once more by scoring a header from a Lewis Grabban cross against Sheffield Wednesday in a 3–1 victory.

On 3 April Schlupp started in the 2011 Football League Trophy Final, playing the full 90 minutes. Schlupp hit the post with an effort on goal. Carlisle United won the match 1–0.

On 14 April the loan deal was extended to the end of the 2010–11 season.

=== Return to Leicester City ===
==== 2011–12 season ====
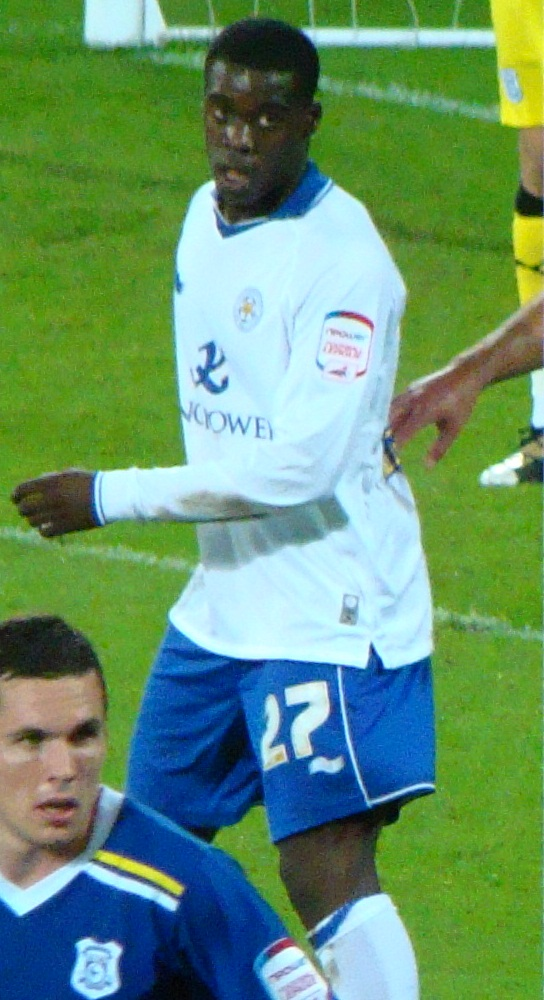
Schlupp playing for Leicester City in 2011

On returning to Leicester, Schlupp travelled with the squad on their tour to Sweden often playing in friendlies as a left-back. He was given the squad number 27 for the 2011–12 season. In his first competitive senior appearance for the club he scored a hat-trick against Rotherham United in the League Cup first round on 9 August. He made his league debut in a 2–0 defeat to Reading on 13 August, and scored his first league goal in a 4–0 win over local rivals Derby County on 1 October. Schlupp scored his second league goal, and Leicester City's 4,000th home league goal, against Birmingham City in the 80th minute of 13 March 2012 Championship clash. Schlupp ended his first season in the Leicester first team, scoring six times in 26 games in all competitions.

==== 2012–13 season ====
Schlupp spent a week in January 2013 training with Manchester United. This trial was extended into a second and third week into the beginning of February. During his time at Manchester United he played two under-21 games, a game against Liverpool and then a game against West Ham at Upton Park.

Upon Schlupp's return to Leicester he found his way into the Leicester team both at left back and in attack, scoring three goals towards the latter part of the 2012–13 season. Schlupp scored key goals in back to back home games against Birmingham City and Bolton Wanderers.

==== 2013–14 season ====
Schlupp opened his goalscoring account for the 2013–14 season, rounding off a 3–1 away win to against Millwall on New Year's Day 2014 with smart finish through the goalkeeper's legs on his weaker foot. Following regular left-back Paul Konchesky receiving a three-match suspension for a red card against East Midlands rivals Nottingham Forest, Schlupp found greater opportunities at the back of the Leicester side, putting in highly rated performances against Ipswich Town and Charlton Athletic.

==== 2014–15 season ====
On 16 August 2014, Schlupp made his Premier League debut as a second-half substitute against Everton on the opening weekend of the season. On 4 October, Schlupp scored his first Premier League goal, in the 2–2 draw with Burnley. Schlupp scored his second goal of the season on 29 November, in the 2–3 defeat against Queens Park Rangers before adding his third in the 2–2 draw against Liverpool on 1 January 2015. On 18 May 2015, Schlupp's fine first season in the Premier League was met with reward as he was named Leicester City's Young Player of the Year, as voted by the fans, as well as winning the Players' Player of the Year award.

==== 2015–16 season ====
Schlupp started as the left back during Leicester's flying start to the season, although he later moved into a midfield role as the season progressed. Schlupp scored his first goal of the season in the 2–1 away victory against Norwich City. He was ruled out for six weeks in December with a hamstring injury. After returning from the injury Schlupp had a strong impact on Leicester City's season, and contributed hugely to Leicester's unlikely title triumph. As a result of his successful season Schlupp was named Leicester's Young Player of the Year for the second year running beating Demarai Gray and Ben Chilwell to the award.

=== Crystal Palace ===
On 13 January 2017, Schlupp was signed by Premier League club Crystal Palace for a reported £12 million. He made his debut the following day in a 3–0 defeat to London rivals West Ham United. He scored his first goal for the club in the opening game of the 2018–19 season, a 2–0 win against Fulham on 11 August 2018; it was his first Premier League goal since October 2015, ending a goalless run of 1043 days. He later scored the opening goal in a 3–2 victory over champions Manchester City at the City of Manchester Stadium on 22 December.

On 3 December 2019, he came off the bench to score the sole goal in a 1–0 victory over Bournemouth. He scored an equaliser for Palace in a 1–1 draw with Tottenham Hotspur on 26 July 2020, later repeating the same feat against the same opposition on 13 December.

Schlupp scored an equaliser within 48 seconds of coming on as a substitute in a 2–2 draw against former club Leicester City on 3 October 2021; it was his first goal under manager Patrick Vieira. He once again came off the bench to score an equaliser in a 1–1 draw with Aston Villa on 15 May 2022. In the following season, Schlupp scored in a 2–1 loss against Manchester United at Old Trafford on 4 February 2023; his goal, an outside-the-boot flick, was nominated for Premier League Goal of the Month.

Schlupp made his 200th Premier League appearance for Palace in a 1–0 loss to Bournemouth on 2 April 2024. On 27 April, he scored an 87th-minute equaliser from outside the box in a 1–1 draw against Fulham; he later stated the goal was the best of his career, with manager Oliver Glasner describing it as an "amazing goal" and a "fantastic finish".

==== Loan to Celtic ====
On 3 February 2025, Schlupp joined Scottish Premiership side Celtic on a loan for the remainder of the 2024–25 season.

==== Departure ====
On 28 May 2025, it was announced that Schlupp was leaving Palace at the end of the 2024–25 season after eight years at the club.

=== Norwich City ===
On 24 July 2025, Norwich City announced the signing of Schlupp on a one-year contract, ahead of their 2025–26 season. On 24 April 2026, Norwich announced that Schlupp would leave the club at the end of his contract that summer.

== International career ==
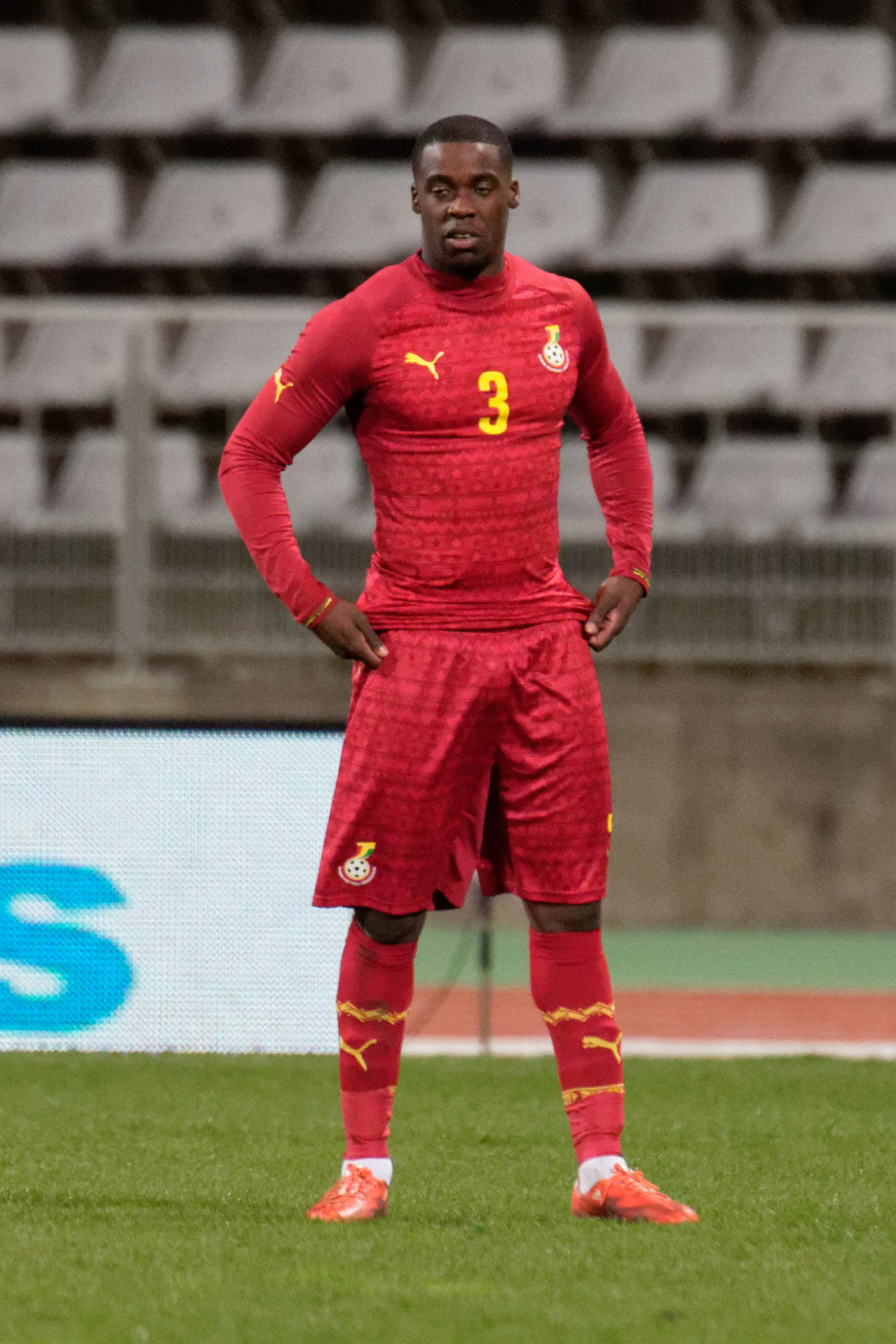
Schlupp playing for Ghana in 2015

=== Germany ===
Schlupp was called up to a Germany under-19 training camp in early 2011, but did not earn a cap in Ralf Minge's side.

=== Ghana ===
On 7 November 2011, Schlupp was called up to the Ghana squad to face Sierra Leone and Gabon. Schlupp made his Ghana debut against Gabon on 15 November, coming on as a late substitute for Prince Tagoe. In April 2014, it was reported that The Black Stars' coaching team are believed to have watched Schlupp play with a view to taking him to the 2014 FIFA World Cup in Brazil following a string of impressive performances for Leicester. Schlupp played in a friendly against Netherlands on 31 May but wasn't named in Ghana's final 23. Schlupp was recalled to the Ghana squad for the 2015 Africa Cup of Nations qualifiers against Uganda and Togo in September 2014. He earned his fourth cap as a late substitute in Ghana's 3–1 win against Togo in the Black Stars' last African Cup of Nations qualifier on 19 November 2014. Schlupp returned to the Black Stars squad in March 2015, coming on as a second-half substitute in the 2–1 defeat to Senegal on 28 March and playing the full 90 minutes in a 1–1 draw with Mali on 31 March.

Schlupp scored his first goal for Ghana in a 7–1 win over Mauritius in an African Cup of Nations qualifier on 14 June 2015.

== Style of play ==
Schlupp is known for his extreme pace and athleticism, which allows him to be a versatile option and able to play anywhere on the left wing. Former teammate Andrej Kramarić once said of Schlupp, "I've never played with a more powerful player than Jeffrey Schlupp, such power and speed like I've never seen before."

== Personal life ==
Schlupp became a father in January 2014 to a son, Arlo. Outside football, Schlupp is involved in property investment, which he plans to do full time upon retiring from football.

== Career statistics ==
=== Club ===
As of match played 5 November 2025

Appearances and goals by club, season and competition
Club	Season	League			National cup (Note: Includes FA Cup, Scottish Cup)		League cup (Note: Includes Football League Cup/EFL Cup)		Europe		Other		Total	
Club	Season	Division	Apps	Goals	Apps	Goals	Apps	Goals	Apps	Goals	Apps	Goals	Apps	Goals
Brentford (loan)	2010–11	League One	9	6	—		—		—		1 (Note: Appearance in Football League Trophy)	0	10	6
Leicester City	2011–12	Championship	21	2	2	0	3	4	—		—		26	6
Leicester City	2012–13	Championship	19	3	0	0	1	0	—		2 (Note: Appearances in Championship play-offs)	0	22	3
Leicester City	2013–14	Championship	26	1	1	0	5	0	—		—		32	1
Leicester City	2014–15	Premier League	32	3	2	1	1	0	—		—		35	4
Leicester City	2015–16	Premier League	24	1	0	0	2	0	—		—		26	1
Leicester City	2016–17	Premier League	4	0	—		1	0	3 (Note: Appearances in UEFA Champions League)	0	1 (Note: Appearance in FA Community Shield)	0	9	0
Leicester City	Total		126	10	5	1	13	4	3	0	3	0	150	15
Crystal Palace	2016–17	Premier League	15	0	1	0	—		—		—		16	0
Crystal Palace	2017–18	Premier League	24	0	1	0	2	0	—		—		27	0
Crystal Palace	2018–19	Premier League	30	4	4	1	3	0	—		—		37	5
Crystal Palace	2019–20	Premier League	17	3	0	0	0	0	—		—		17	3
Crystal Palace	2020–21	Premier League	27	2	0	0	1	0	—		—		28	2
Crystal Palace	2021–22	Premier League	32	4	4	0	1	0	—		—		37	4
Crystal Palace	2022–23	Premier League	34	3	1	0	1	0	—		—		36	3
Crystal Palace	2023–24	Premier League	29	2	2	0	2	0	—		—		33	2
Crystal Palace	2024–25	Premier League	12	0	1	0	3	0	—		—		16	0
Crystal Palace	Total		220	18	14	1	13	0	—		—		247	19
Celtic (loan)	2024–25	Scottish Premiership	13	1	3	0	—		2	0	—		18	1
Norwich City	2025–26	Championship	9	0	0	0	2	0	—		—		11	0
Career total			377	35	22	2	28	4	5	0	4	0	435	41

=== International ===
As of match played 3 September 2021

International statistics
National team	Year	Apps	Goals
Ghana	2011	1	0
Ghana	2014	2	0
Ghana	2015	7	1
Ghana	2016	5	0
Ghana	2017	2	0
Ghana	2019	1	0
Ghana	2020	1	0
Ghana	2021	1	0
Total		20	1

International goals

Scores and results list Ghana's goal tally first.

No.	Date	Venue	Opponent	Score	Result	Competition
1	14 June 2015	Accra Sports Stadium, Accra, Ghana	Mauritius	6–1	7–1	2017 Africa Cup of Nations qualification

== Honours ==
Brentford

- Football League Trophy runner-up: 2010–11

Leicester City

- Premier League: 2015–16
- Football League Championship: 2013–14

Crystal Palace

- FA Cup: 2024–25

Celtic

- Scottish Premiership: 2024–25

Individual

- Leicester City Academy Player of the Year: 2010–11
- Leicester City Young Player of the Year: 2014–15, 2015–16
- Leicester City Players' Player of the Year: 2014–15
