= David Nugent =

English footballer (born 1985)

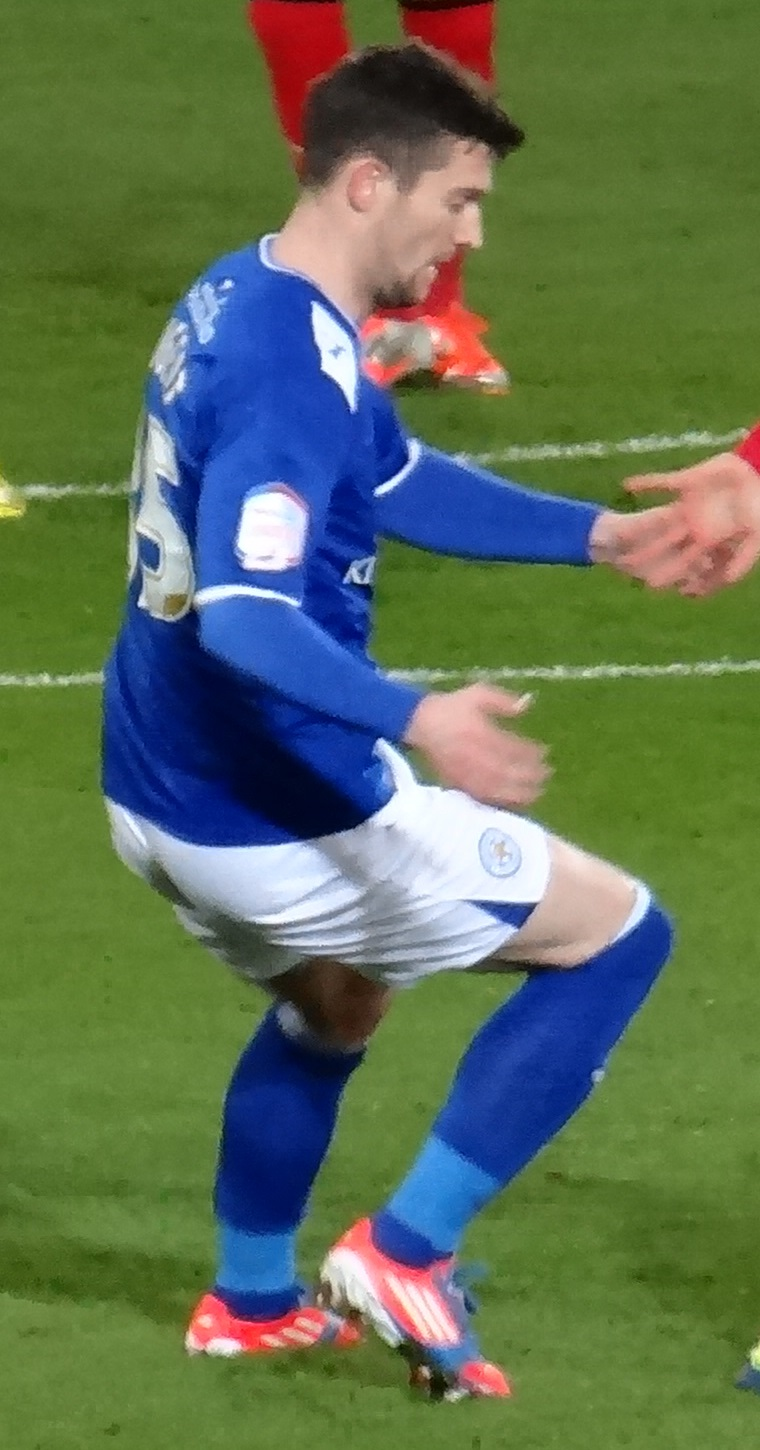
- Nugent playing for Leicester City in 2013

Personal information
- Full name: David James Nugent
- Date of birth: 2 May 1985 (age 41)
- Place of birth: Huyton, England
- Height: 5 ft 11 in (1.80 m)
- Position: Striker

Team information
- Current team: Anstey Nomads (player-coach)

Youth career
- –2000: Liverpool
- 2000–2002: Bury

Senior career*
Years	Team	Apps	(Gls)
2002–2005	Bury	88	(18)
2005–2007	Preston North End	94	(33)
2007–2011	Portsmouth	78	(16)
2009–2010	→ Burnley (loan)	30	(6)
2011–2015	Leicester City	159	(54)
2015–2017	Middlesbrough	42	(8)
2017–2019	Derby County	85	(17)
2019–2021	Preston North End	24	(1)
2021	→ Tranmere Rovers (loan)	18	(2)
2025–	Anstey Nomads	1	(0)

International career
2005–2007	England U21	14	(4)
2007	England	1	(1)
- * Club domestic league appearances and goals as of 22:57, 20 December 2025 (UTC)

David James Nugent (born 2 May 1985) is an English footballer who plays as a striker for Southern League Premier Division Central club Anstey Nomads.

He started his career in 2002 when he signed his first professional contract with Bury. He left the club in 2005, when he joined Preston North End for two seasons. Nugent joined Portsmouth in 2007, and later joined Burnley for the 2009–10 season, before returning to Portsmouth for one final season in 2010. He signed for Leicester City in 2011, where he played for the club for four seasons, before joining Middlesbrough in 2015. After helping Middlesbrough secure promotion to the Premier League, Nugent joined Derby County after his starting position at Middlesbrough was put in jeopardy. Nugent signed for Tranmere Rovers on loan from Preston North End for the remainder of the 2020–21 season.

Nugent played for England at under-21 level, before playing one match and scoring for the senior team.

== Club career ==
=== Bury ===
Born in Huyton, Merseyside, Nugent was a member of the Liverpool youth academy but left aged 15. It was only once he changed his position that he then became a professional with Bury, joining the club's successful Youth and Centre of Excellence department. After making his debut as a substitute against Port Vale in March 2002 at the age of just 16, Nugent initially struggled to live up to his early potential, but an explosive start to the 2004–05 League Two season saw several larger clubs take an interest.

=== Preston North End ===
Although a target for rivals Burnley, Nugent opted to join Preston North End rather than Northampton Town from Bury in January 2005 for a fee of £100,000.

He scored 10 league goals in 32 Championship appearances in 2005–06, as Preston finished fourth, losing to Leeds United in the playoff semi-final, thus failing to gain promotion. Despite transfer speculation, Nugent spent the following season at Preston, scoring 15 goals in 43 appearances, and winning England recognition. Preston finished seventh in 2006–07.

=== Portsmouth ===
After both Sunderland and Portsmouth had bids in the region of £6 million accepted for the player, Nugent was eventually unveiled as a Pompey player at a press conference alongside John Utaka on 11 July 2007. However, rumours followed just weeks later that Derby County were considering a bid for Nugent and that he would be leaving Portsmouth in the same transfer window he arrived in. In a post-match press conference following a League Cup match early on in Nugent's Pompey career, in which he scored his first goal for the club, Portsmouth manager Harry Redknapp publicly stated Nugent would be free to leave the club if the right offer came in to help fund a move for more players. However, Nugent stated he wanted to stay at Portsmouth.

A possible loan deal to Ipswich Town fell through in early March 2008 with Jim Magilton, the Ipswich manager, left questioning Nugent's fitness.

Nugent appeared frequently for Portsmouth in the FA Cup, scoring a goal in their third-round tie against Ipswich Town. His role culminated in coming on for John Utaka in the 69th minute of the final against Cardiff City, eventually winning the trophy.

The next season and after 18 months at the club, Nugent scored his first Premier League goal – against former manager Harry Redknapp at Tottenham Hotspur in a 1–1 draw on 18 January 2009. Two matches later he scored his second goal at Fulham and followed this up with his first league goal at Fratton Park, scoring against Liverpool on 7 February 2009. However, these were to be Nugent's only top flight goals for Pompey.

On 5 August 2009, it was reported that Nugent had been involved in an alleged bust-up with teammate Marc Wilson during Portsmouth's pre-season trip to Portugal. Both players were sent home and subsequently fined two weeks' wages by the club.

On 1 September 2009, it was reported that Nugent was in talks with Burnley about a loan move. Thirty minutes after the transfer window closed it was reported that Burnley had signed Nugent on a six-month-long loan deal with a view to a permanent move, subject to Premier League clearance. On 12 September, he made his debut for the Clarets when he replaced Martin Paterson 70 minutes into the match against Liverpool at Anfield. After coming on as a second-half substitute for the Clarets on his home debut against Sunderland, Nugent scored two goals, helping Burnley to a 3–1 win. Nugent signed another loan agreement with Burnley on 1 February which would keep him at the club on loan until June.

After failing to renegotiate a permanent deal with Burnley or attract an alternative Premier League club, Nugent returned to newly relegated Portsmouth in the 2010–11 pre-season. He was a regular starter as a left sided forward. After an initial goal drought that saw him fail to hit the net until his goal in a 6–1 defeat of Leicester City on 24 September 2010 (his first for Pompey since February 2009), Nugent finished the season as Portsmouth's top goalscorer, scoring 14 goals in all competitions.

=== Leicester City ===
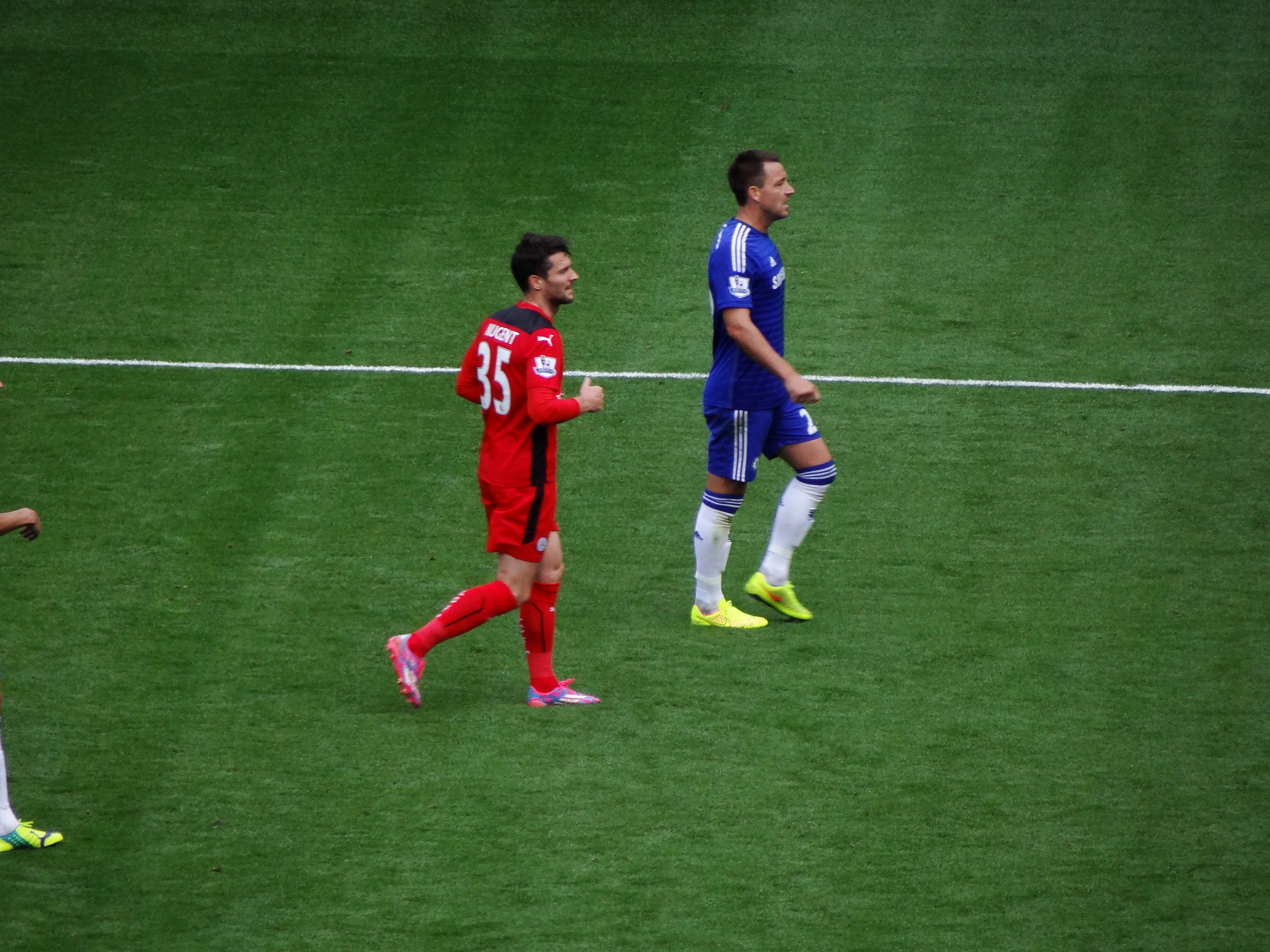
Nugent (left) playing for Leicester City in 2014

On 5 July 2011, Nugent signed for Leicester City on a three-year deal after his contract with Portsmouth expired. He made his competitive debut in a 1–0 win over Coventry City on 6 August 2011, scoring his first goal for the club in a 2–1 defeat to Bristol City on 17 August. On 18 February 2012, Nugent scored the winning goal to knock Premier League team Norwich City out of the FA Cup at Carrow Road and put Leicester through to the quarter-finals. Nugent finished the 2011–12 season as the club's top goalscorer with 16 goals in all competitions.

On 23 September 2012, Nugent scored his first career hat-trick in a 3–1 win against Hull City at the King Power Stadium. Nugent's form continued with further strikes against Bristol City, Watford and Nottingham Forest. During the match against Nottingham Forest, Nugent suffered a neck injury which later was revealed to be a slipped disc. Nugent started the match the following week against Ipswich Town and scored two goals but had to be substituted after half an hour for Jamie Vardy because of the neck injury. Nugent then missed both the matches against Sheffield Wednesday and Leeds United. He made his return as a substitute against Derby County. He came off the bench to score two goals to give Leicester a 4–1 win over their East Midlands rivals. He ended 2012–13 as Leicester's top scorer for the second consecutive season.

On 22 February 2014, Nugent scored his 50th league goal for Leicester against Ipswich Town. During 2013–14, he scored 20 league goals and set up a further 12 as Leicester secured promotion into the Premier League as 2013–14 Football League Championship title winners.

On 9 July 2014, Nugent signed a two-year contract extension until the summer of 2016 with Leicester City.

Nugent's first Premier League goal for Leicester came with a penalty in a 5–3 home win against Manchester United on 21 September 2014. On 1 January 2015, he scored his second goal of the season, and first from open play, after coming on as a substitute in Leicester's 2–2 draw with Liverpool at Anfield. On 22 February, Nugent scored in a 2–2 draw with his boyhood club Everton at Goodison Park. He scored his fourth goal of the season in a 4–3 defeat to Tottenham Hotspur at White Hart Lane on 21 March.

=== Middlesbrough ===
Nugent, Jordan Rhodes and Dwight Gayle were linked to join Championship club Middlesbrough, and on 14 August 2015, Nugent signed a three-year contract with the club for an undisclosed fee, reported to be an initial £2 million, to be doubled if the club secured promotion. He made his debut for the club on 15 August 2015, in a 3–0 home win against Bolton Wanderers. On 12 September 2015, he scored his first goal for the club in a 2–0 win over Milton Keynes Dons at the Riverside.

After a 1–1 draw with Brighton & Hove Albion on 7 May 2016, Middlesbrough secured promotion to the 2016–17 Premier League season, with them placing second in the league table behind champions Burnley.

=== Derby County ===
On 9 January 2017, Nugent joined Championship club Derby County for an undisclosed fee, reported to be around £2.5 million, on a 2 1/2-year contract. He joined former Middlesbrough teammate Julien De Sart, who signed for the club on 5 January 2017, on loan for the remainder of the season. On 13 January 2017, Nugent made his debut for Derby in a 1–0 loss against Leeds United. He scored his first goal on 4 March 2017 in a 2–1 home win against Barnsley, where he was also given a yellow card. Nugent scored his second goal on 18 March 2017, in a 2–2 away draw against Nottingham Forest. He later scored a hat-trick in a 4–2 home win on 11 April against Fulham.

He was released by Derby County at the end of the 2018–19 season. He returned to the club on 22 July 2023 for a pre-season friendly against Stoke City, which also acted as Craig Forsyth's testimonial fixture. He came on late in the second half, in a game that Derby won 3–0, thanks to first-half goals from Curtis Nelson, James Collins and Nathaniel Mendez-Laing.

=== Return to Preston North End ===
On 17 July 2019, Nugent returned to Preston North End, now in the Championship, joining them on a free transfer.

==== Loan to Tranmere Rovers ====
On 1 February 2021, Nugent joined Tranmere Rovers on loan for the remainder of the 2020–21 season.

=== Anstey Nomads ===
On 17 October 2025, Nugent returned to playing following his retirement four years prior, joining Northern Premier League Division One Midlands club Anstey Nomads as player-coach. He made his debut for the club on 6 December in a 1–1 draw with Coleshill Town.

== International career ==
Nugent made his debut for the England under-21 team against Wales in February 2005. He scored his first goal for the team on his debut, a 2–2 draw with Moldova on 15 August 2006. Teamed up front again with Arsenal's Theo Walcott, he scored his second goal in the 3–2 win over Switzerland on 6 September 2006 that advanced the team into the play-off round of 2007 UEFA European Under-21 Championship qualification. He scored his third goal against Spain. In June 2007, Nugent represented the under-21s in the 2007 UEFA European Under-21 Championship in the Netherlands.

On 19 March 2007, following much speculation after Steve McClaren confirmed he had been watching Nugent, he was called into the full England squad to replace the injured Darren Bent of Charlton Athletic.

On 28 March 2007, Nugent made his debut as a late substitute for England in a UEFA Euro 2008 qualifying match against Andorra in Barcelona. He marked the occasion by scoring the final goal in a 3–0 win in the 93rd minute, tapping in a goal-bound shot from Jermain Defoe as it was about to cross the line. Nugent, in his post-match press interview, expressed genuine satisfaction over having accomplished a "1 Goal/1 Cap" national team record. Nugent never received another England cap, and his 11-minute national team career is the shortest of any player who has scored for England.

Nugent was the first Preston player to play for the national team since Tom Finney some 49 years previously, as well as the first England national team footballer from a club playing in the Football League since David James of West Ham in 2003. He was also the first Football League outfield player since Michael Gray of Sunderland in 1999.

== Personal life ==
Nugent is an Everton supporter.

== Career statistics ==
=== Club ===
Appearances and goals by club, season and competition
Club	Season	League			FA Cup		League Cup		Other		Total	
Club	Season	Division	Apps	Goals	Apps	Goals	Apps	Goals	Apps	Goals	Apps	Goals
Bury	2001–02	Second Division	5	0	0	0	0	0	0	0	5	0
Bury	2002–03	Third Division	31	4	1	0	1	0	6 (Note: Four appearances and one goal in Football League Trophy, two appearances in Third Division play-offs)	1	39	5
Bury	2003–04	Third Division	26	3	1	0	1	0	1 (Note: Appearance in Football League Trophy)	0	29	3
Bury	2004–05	League Two	26	11	2	1	1	0	0	0	29	12
Bury	Total		88	18	4	1	3	0	7	1	102	20
Preston North End	2004–05	Championship	18	8	—		—		3 (Note: Appearances in Championship play-offs)	1	21	9
Preston North End	2005–06	Championship	32	10	3	0	1	0	2	1	38	11
Preston North End	2006–07	Championship	44	15	3	2	1	0	—		48	17
Preston North End	Total		94	33	6	2	2	0	5	2	107	37
Portsmouth	2007–08	Premier League	15	0	4	1	3	2	—		22	3
Portsmouth	2008–09	Premier League	16	3	3	0	0	0	0	0	19	3
Portsmouth	2009–10	Premier League	3	0	—		1	0	—		4	0
Portsmouth	2010–11	Championship	44	13	1	0	3	1	—		48	14
Portsmouth	Total		78	16	8	1	7	3	0	0	93	20
Burnley (loan)	2009–10	Premier League	30	6	—		—		—		30	6
Leicester City	2011–12	Championship	42	15	5	1	1	0	—		48	16
Leicester City	2012–13	Championship	42	14	3	0	2	0	2	2	49	16
Leicester City	2013–14	Championship	46	20	1	1	4	1	—		51	22
Leicester City	2014–15	Premier League	29	5	2	0	1	0	—		32	5
Leicester City	Total		159	54	11	2	8	1	2	2	180	59
Middlesbrough	2015–16	Championship	38	8	1	0	1	0	—		40	8
Middlesbrough	2016–17	Premier League	4	0	0	0	1	1	—		5	1
Middlesbrough	Total		42	8	1	0	2	1	—		45	9
Derby County	2016–17	Championship	17	6	1	0	—		—		18	6
Derby County	2017–18	Championship	37	9	0	0	0	0	2	0	39	9
Derby County	2018–19	Championship	31	2	4	0	2	0	1	0	38	2
Derby County	Total		85	17	5	0	2	0	3	0	95	17
Preston North End	2019–20	Championship	24	1	0	0	1	0	—		25	1
Preston North End	2020–21	Championship	0	0	0	0	0	0	—		0	0
Preston North End	Total		24	1	0	0	1	0	0	0	25	1
Tranmere Rovers (loan)	2020–21	League Two	18	2	0	0	0	0	3 (Note: one appearance in Football League Trophy, two appearances in Third Division play-offs)	0	21	2
Career total			618	155	35	6	25	5	20	5	698	171

=== International ===
Appearances and goals by national team and year
National team	Year	Apps	Goals
England	2007	1	1
Total		1	1

England score listed first, score column indicates score after each Nugent goal.

List of international goals scored by David Nugent
No.	Date	Venue	Cap	Opponent	Score	Result	Competition	Ref.
1	28 March 2007	Estadi Olímpic Lluís Companys, Barcelona, Spain	1	Andorra	3–0	3–0	UEFA Euro 2008 qualification	

== Honours ==
Portsmouth

- FA Cup: 2007–08

Leicester City

- Football League Championship: 2013–14

Middlesbrough

- Football League Championship runner-up: 2015–16

Tranmere Rovers

- EFL Trophy runner-up: 2020–21

Individual

- The Football League Young Player of the Year: 2005–06
- Football League Championship Player of the Month: March 2005, January 2006
