= Jon Rudkin =

English football manager (born 1968)

Jonathan Rudkin (born 13 January 1968) is an English association football academy coach.

On 3 March 2026, Leicester City announced a “evolved senior leadership structure” and Rudkin became City’s Chief Football Officer. The official announcement said that 2026 marked 30 years since he had joined the Foxes. His new role involves “providing executive leadership of all football matters, ensuring long-term sporting alignment, strategic squad development and the high-performance environment required to deliver sustained competitive success”.

Previously, starting on 14 December 2014, he was the Director of Football at the club.

Since 12 June 2017, he is a board member at Oud-Heverlee Leuven. Both clubs are owned by the King Power International Group.

== Leicester City ==
Rudkin formally started at the club in 1996.

=== Youth roles ===
Rudkin joined Leicester City as an academy coach in 1998 and became Academy Manager on 1 July 2003, a role he would maintain until 13 December 2014.

He grew up in Wigston, a suburb of Leicester, and was in the Leicester City youth system until the age of 16. He played for Leicester United before going onto help the youth at Leicester City on a voluntary basis. He then worked his way up to be a coach, according to Ian Baraclough and Matt Piper.

In 1998 he joined the academy as coach alongside David Nish and Neville Hamilton. Piper says, he "never shouted, he never got upset. He was the softer version of them all."

Micky Adams, Leicester's manager at the time, suggested that Rudkin was a good choice to become Academy Manager in 2003, rather than recruit from outside the club. According to Adams, he was, "softly spoken and mild-mannered, and also very knowledgeable regarding the local youth football scene."

During his time as Academy Manager, Leicester produced a number of players who would go on to win the Premier League with the club in 2015-16, such as Andy King and Jeffrey Schlupp.

Caretaker Manager

Rudkin joint managed the senior squad for one match in 2007 between the departure of Martin Allen and the start of Gary Megson's brief stay at the club.

He also helped to manage the first team for three games in the gap between the dismissal of Sven-Göran Eriksson and the re-appointment of Nigel Pearson in the autumn of 2011.

=== Director of Football ===
On 14 December 2014, Rudkin replaced the outgoing Terry Robinson as Leicester City's Director of Football.

During his time as Director the club has arguably had the most successful period in its existence. They won the 2015–16 Premier League title and then the FA Cup and FA Community Shield in 2021. They reached the UEFA Champions League quarter-finals in 2016–17 and UEFA Europa Conference League semi-finals in 2021–22. Rudkin chose to keep a low profile, rarely talking to the media despite the club’s successes.

However, Rudkin has also received criticism from Leicester fans for missing out on a number of transfer targets. One embarrassing episode for the club was in August 2017, where transfer documentation was sent to the Football Association 14 seconds too late to complete the signing of Sporting CP midfielder Adrien Silva. This is despite Rudkin having sanctioned the sale of midfielder Danny Drinkwater to Chelsea only minutes earlier. Silva would join the club in January 2018.

Board Member at OH Leuven

On 12 June 2017, the King Power International Group bought a 92% share in Belgian club, Oud-Heverlee Leuven and Rudkin took on a role as a Board Member at that club.

Relationship with Vichai Srivaddhanaprabha

According to Tanner, Rudkin was Vichai Srivaddhanaprabha's right hand man. He not only helped with footballing matters, but helped the group establish a horse racing stables known as King Power Racing.

Rudkin was also one of the last people to see Vichai alive before the 2018 Leicester helicopter crash. On 27 October 2018, he walked with Vichai to the helicopter and waved him off, receiving a thumbs up from him in reply. The vehicle later crashed killing all on board.

== Managerial statistics ==
Managerial record by team and tenure
Team	From	To	Record					Ref
Team	From	To	P	W	D	L	Win %	Ref
Leicester City (caretaker)	29 August 2007	13 September 2007	1	0	1	0	0.0	
Leicester City (caretaker)	24 October 2011	15 November 2011	3	1	0	2	33.3	
Total			4	1	1	2	25.0	—
