= Paul Konchesky =

English football manager (born 1981)

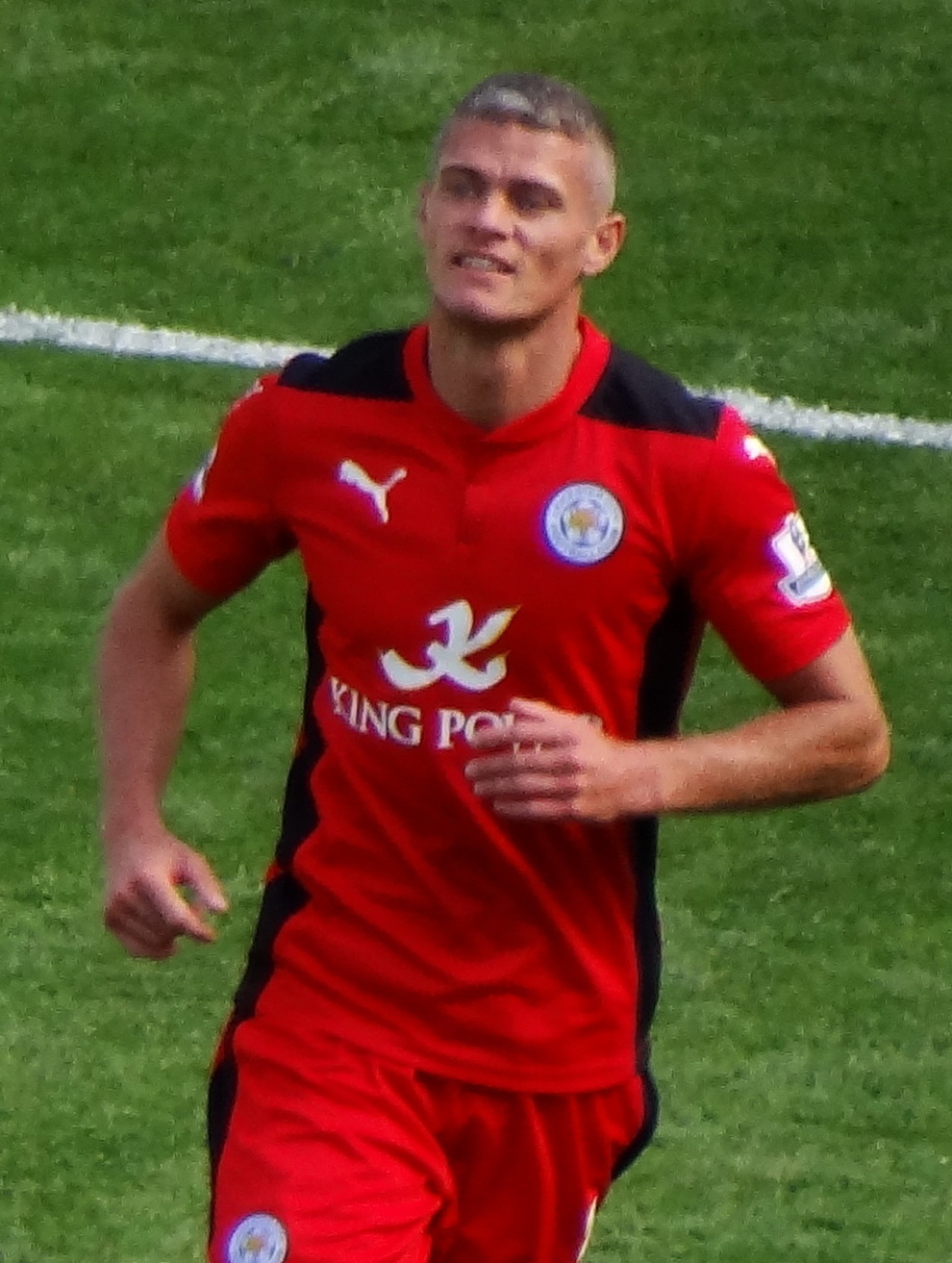
- Konchesky playing for Leicester City in 2014

Personal information
- Full name: Paul Martyn Konchesky
- Date of birth: 15 May 1981 (age 45)
- Place of birth: Barking, England
- Height: 5 ft 10 in (1.78 m)
- Position: Left back

Youth career
- Senrab
- West Ham United
- Charlton Athletic

Senior career*
Years	Team	Apps	(Gls)
1997–2005	Charlton Athletic	149	(5)
2003	→ Tottenham Hotspur (loan)	12	(0)
2005–2007	West Ham United	59	(1)
2007–2010	Fulham	97	(2)
2010–2011	Liverpool	15	(0)
2011	→ Nottingham Forest (loan)	15	(1)
2011–2016	Leicester City	138	(5)
2015–2016	→ Queens Park Rangers (loan)	34	(0)
2016–2017	Gillingham	25	(0)
2017	Billericay Town	23	(0)
2018	East Thurrock United	5	(0)
2020	Billericay Town	3	(0)
Total		575	(14)

International career
1998–2000	England U18	6	(0)
2002–2003	England U21	15	(0)
2003–2005	England	2	(0)

Managerial career
- 2020: Billericay Town (assistant)
- 2021–2022: West Ham United Women (assistant)
- 2022–2023: West Ham United Women
- * Club domestic league appearances and goals

Paul Martyn Konchesky (born 15 May 1981) is an English football coach and former professional player who most recently was manager of West Ham United Women of the FA WSL.

During a 21-year playing career, Konchesky played as a left back notably in the Premier League for Charlton Athletic, Tottenham Hotspur, West Ham United, Fulham, Liverpool and Leicester City, as well as in the Football League for Nottingham Forest, Queens Park Rangers and Gillingham. He spent the final three years of his career playing non-league football for Billericay Town and East Thurrock United. Konchesky made 15 appearances for the England under-21 team and was capped twice for England.

== Background ==
Born in Barking, Konchesky studied at Eastbrook Comprehensive School in Dagenham, and played for Great Danes YFC amateur club, as well as being a product of the Senrab F.C. academy, which has produced a number of notable players such as John Terry and Jermain Defoe. He signed for West Ham as a boy at the Academy. He owes his surname to his Polish great-grandfather. He is a lifelong supporter of West Ham United and once held a season-ticket for the Bobby Moore Stand, his idol being Julian Dicks. Konchesky's nephew, Frankie Terry, is a professional footballer for Colchester United.

Konchesky sported a shaved head for most of his career, growing out his hair in 2014. He has two sons and a daughter. In September 2015, he opened Konch's Kafe serving the East End delicacy pie and mash in Brentwood, Essex, employing his mother Carol.

== Club career ==
=== Charlton Athletic ===
Konchesky signed for Charlton as a trainee in August 1997. He became the youngest player to appear in the first team for Charlton (a record later broken by Jonjo Shelvey) when he played against Oxford United in August 1997 at the age of 16 years and 93 days but it was not until the 2000–01 season when he made 27 appearances, that he became a regular in the first team. In June 2003, frustrated by a lack of first-team opportunities at his preferred position of left back, Konchesky made a written request for a transfer, which was accepted by Charlton. However, firm offers were not forthcoming. Instead Konchesky joined Tottenham on loan. A spate of injuries at Charlton led to Konchesky being recalled from Spurs in December 2003, when he also came off the transfer list.

==== Tottenham Hotspur (loan) ====
In September 2003, Konchesky joined Tottenham Hotspur on one-month loan. The loan was extended for a further month and then until January 2004. Although Konchesky was keen on a permanent move to Tottenham, no move materialised.

=== West Ham United ===
Konchesky joined West Ham United in July 2005 for a fee of £1.5 million, having made a total of 168 appearances for Charlton in all competitions, scoring six goals, and 15 appearances for Tottenham. He made 45 league and cup appearances in the 2005–06 season, helping West Ham to ninth place in the Premier League and to the 2006 FA Cup Final, where he scored when his cross went straight into the net but later had a spot kick saved as West Ham went down to Liverpool on penalties after drawing 3–3 after extra time.

He lost his place in the first team to George McCartney during the 2006–07 season, making only 25 appearances as West Ham slipped into the relegation places and only secured their place in the Premier League on the final day of the season. He left the club in July 2007 having made a total of 70 league and cup appearances for West Ham, scoring two goals.

=== Fulham ===
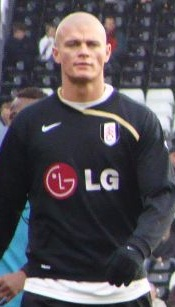
Konchesky warming up for Fulham in 2008

Konchesky signed a four-year contract with Fulham in July 2007, for a fee of up to £3.25m. Konchesky played the first game of the 2008–09 season for Fulham against new Premier League team Hull City but his mistake greatly helped the opposing team score a winner after he stumbled over the ball. He missed the next game against Arsenal due to injury but returned to action the following league game against Bolton Wanderers. He scored his first goal for the club, a 35-yard piledriver into the top left hand corner of the net in January 2009 at the Boleyn Ground, in a 3–1 defeat against his former side West Ham, which later won the January 2009 Goal of the Month competition and was included in the running for Goal of the Season.

In September 2009, Konchesky continued his goalscoring by putting Fulham level with Everton in a 2–1 win, scoring with the aid of a deflection off Everton defender Sylvain Distin. Konchesky played for Fulham in the 2009–10 Europa League final against Atlético Madrid in which Fulham were defeated after losing 2–1 from two Diego Forlán strikes.

On 27 August 2010, it was reported that Konchesky was set for a medical at Liverpool ahead of an expected move thought to be worth £3–£4 million.

=== Liverpool ===
On 31 August 2010, Konchesky signed a four-year contract with Liverpool. He made his league debut on 12 September against Birmingham City, though in the 77th minute he was injured and was substituted. He made his UEFA Europa League debut four days later in a group stage tie against Steaua București at Anfield, with Liverpool comprehensively winning 4–1. However his time at Liverpool was a disappointment with the defender struggling at the club. An error against Spurs allowing Aaron Lennon to score the winner was heavily criticised and Konchesky was sarcastically cheered by Liverpool fans when substituted in the home defeat to Wolves.

==== Nottingham Forest (loan) ====
In January 2011, Konchesky fell out of favour after the arrival of new manager Kenny Dalglish, in his second stint as Liverpool boss, and on 31 January he joined Nottingham Forest on a 93-day emergency loan deal. He immediately made his debut for Forest on 1 February in a 2–1 away win against Coventry City. On 22 February 2011 Konchesky scored an equalising goal at home to Preston North End. He played his final game for Forest on 30 April 2011 in a 5–1 win over Scunthorpe United.

=== Leicester City ===
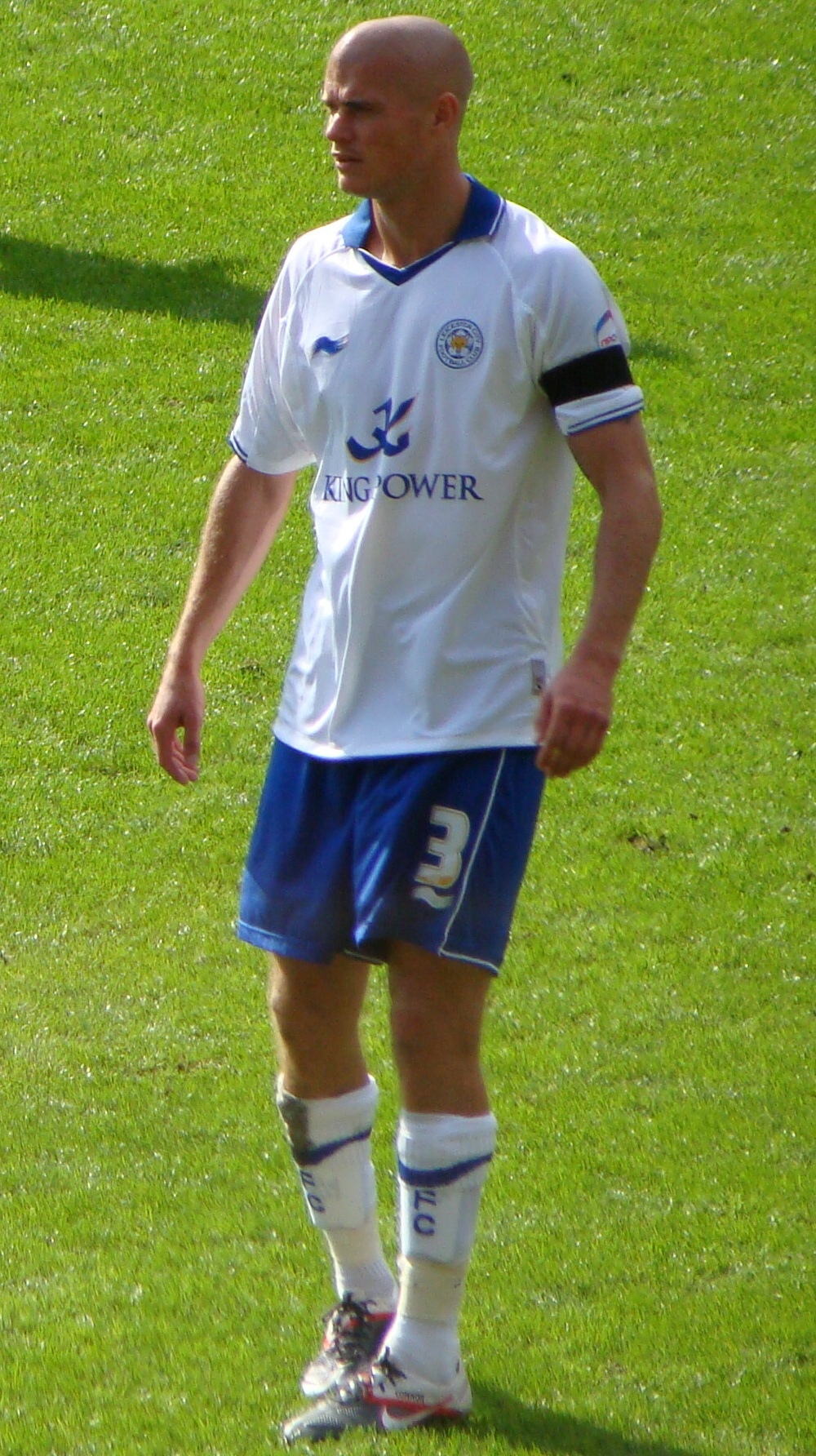
Konchesky playing for Leicester City in 2011

Konchesky joined Leicester City for an undisclosed fee on 13 July 2011, signing a three-year contract. He made his debut on 20 August 2011 in a 2–2 draw against Nottingham Forest at the City Ground, playing the full 90 minutes. He scored his first league goal for the club in a 3–1 win at Burnley on 1 November 2011.

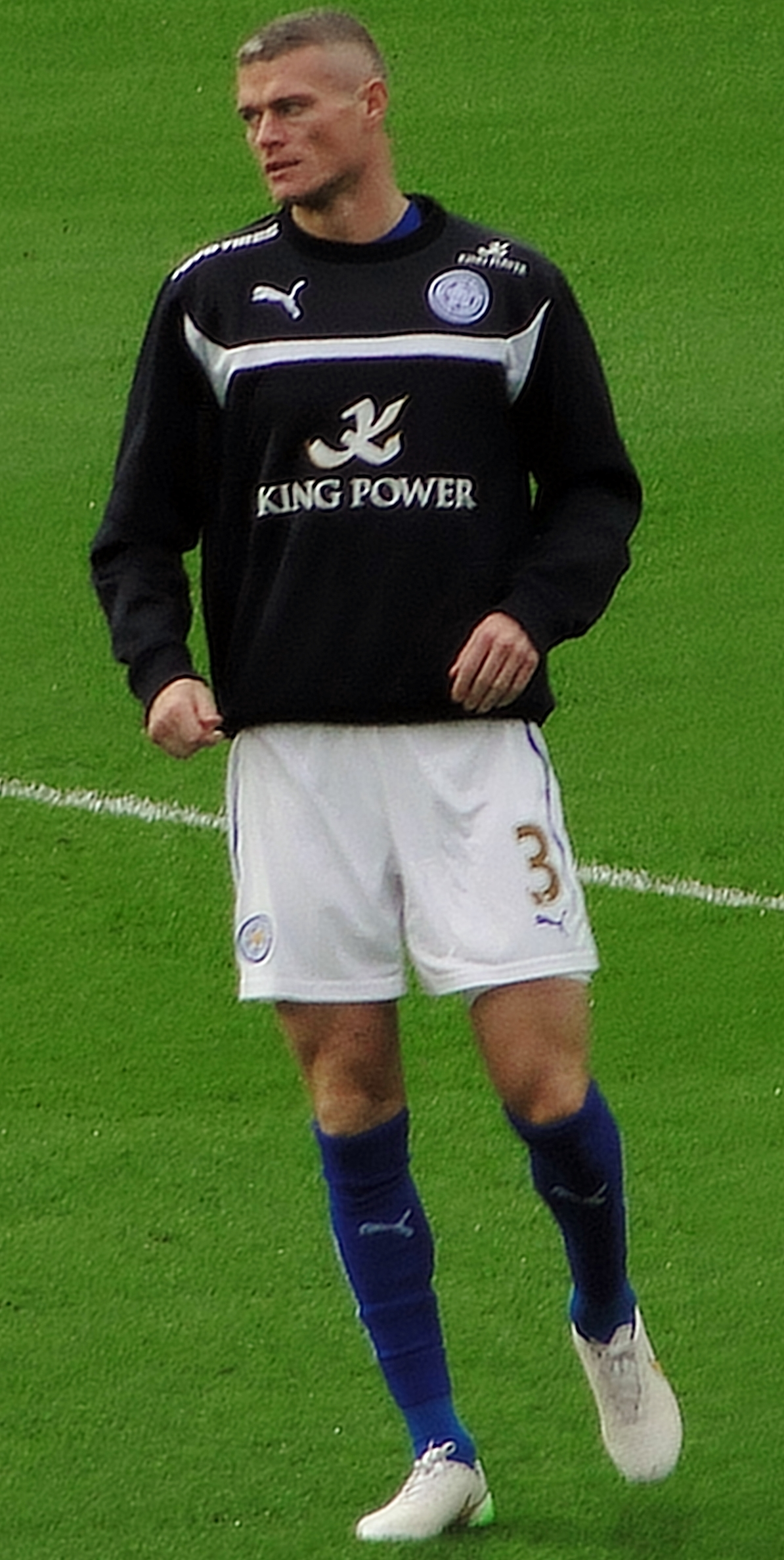
Konchesky in 2014

In August 2013, Konchesky was omitted from the squad and was on the verge of leaving the club, but returned to the first-team after a transfer deal fell through. He signed a new 18-month deal in January 2014, having agreed to a substantial wage cut. Konchesky was a key figure when Leicester won promotion to the Premier League in the 2013–14 season. In the 2014–15 season, he also helped the club survive relegation, scoring his first Premier League goal in 1945 days in a 1–0 win over Aston Villa on 10 January 2015. On 30 July 2015, having not featured in any of the club's pre-season friendlies, Konchesky was told by manager Claudio Ranieri that he was "not in his plans" and would be free to look for a new club.

On 4 August 2015, Konchesky joined Queens Park Rangers on a season-long loan. Konchesky made his QPR debut in the first game of the Championship season, a 2–0 loss at Charlton in which he played the whole game and was booked in the 88th minute. On 27 June 2016, Leicester released him.

=== Gillingham and Billericay Town ===
On 21 July 2016, Konchesky joined Gillingham on a one-year contract. He remained with the club only until the following February, when he dropped four levels to join Billericay Town of the Isthmian League.

Having played twelve times in the 2016–17 season, Konchesky made a further eleven league appearances the following season, before leaving Billericay in November 2017.

=== East Thurrock United ===
In July 2018, Konchesky joined East Thurrock United of the National League South. On 19 August 2018, via his Instagram account, Konchesky announced that he had left the club by mutual consent.

== International career ==
Konchesky made 15 appearances for the England national under-21 football team, and has two caps for the senior England team. He made his England first team debut in a half-time substitution in the friendly against Australia in February 2003 and made a second appearance for England again in a half-time substitution in the friendly against Argentina in November 2005.

== Coaching career ==
In 2017, Konchesky returned to West Ham in a coaching capacity. In August 2020, Konchesky re-joined Billericay as assistant manager to Jamie O'Hara. He was also registered as a player. However, on 3 December 2020, both Konchesky and O'Hara left the club.

Konchesky became the assistant manager of West Ham United Women in May 2021, and in May 2022 he succeeded Olli Harder as the manager ahead of the 2022–23 FA WSL season.

On 28 May 2023 West Ham announced Konchesky was leaving his job as manager after the team only won one league game in 2023.

== Career statistics ==
Appearances and goals by club, season and competition
Club	Season	League			FA Cup		League Cup		Europe		Total	
Club	Season	Division	Apps	Goals	Apps	Goals	Apps	Goals	Apps	Goals	Apps	Goals
Charlton Athletic	1997–98	First Division	3	0	0	0	1	0	—		4	0
Charlton Athletic	1998–99	Premier League	2	0	0	0	0	0	—		2	0
Charlton Athletic	1999–2000	First Division	8	0	0	0	2	0	—		10	0
Charlton Athletic	2000–01	Premier League	23	0	2	0	2	0	—		27	0
Charlton Athletic	2001–02	Premier League	34	1	2	0	3	1	—		39	2
Charlton Athletic	2002–03	Premier League	30	3	2	0	1	0	—		33	3
Charlton Athletic	2003–04	Premier League	21	0	1	0	0	0	—		22	0
Charlton Athletic	2004–05	Premier League	28	1	3	0	0	0	—		31	1
Charlton Athletic	Total		149	5	10	0	9	1	—		168	6
Tottenham Hotspur (loan)	2003–04	Premier League	12	0	0	0	3	0	—		15	0
West Ham United	2005–06	Premier League	37	1	7	1	1	0	—		46	2
West Ham United	2006–07	Premier League	22	0	0	0	1	0	2 (Note: Appearances in UEFA Cup)	0	25	0
West Ham United	Total		59	1	7	1	2	0	2	0	80	2
Fulham	2007–08	Premier League	33	0	2	0	2	0	—		37	0
Fulham	2008–09	Premier League	36	1	5	0	1	0	—		42	1
Fulham	2009–10	Premier League	27	1	2	0	0	0	13 (Note: Appearances in UEFA Europa League)	0	42	1
Fulham	2010–11	Premier League	1	0	0	0	0	0	—		1	0
Fulham	Total		97	2	9	0	3	0	13	0	122	2
Liverpool	2010–11	Premier League	15	0	0	0	0	0	3	0	18	0
Nottingham Forest (loan)	2010–11	Championship	15	1	0	0	0	0	—		15	1
Leicester City	2011–12	Championship	42	2	5	0	1	0	—		48	2
Leicester City	2012–13	Championship	39	1	3	0	2	0	—		44	1
Leicester City	2013–14	Championship	31	1	1	0	2	0	—		34	1
Leicester City	2014–15	Premier League	26	1	2	0	1	0	—		29	1
Leicester City	Total		138	5	11	0	6	0	—		155	5
Queens Park Rangers (loan)	2015–16	Championship	34	0	0	0	0	0	—		34	0
Gillingham	2016–17	League One	25	0	1	0	3	0	—		29	0
Billericay Town	2016–17	Isthmian League Premier Division	12	0	0	0	—		—		12	0
Billericay Town	2017–18	Isthmian League Premier Division	11	0	0	0	—		—		11	0
Billericay Town	Total		23	0	0	0	—		—		23	0
East Thurrock United	2018–19	National League South	5	0	0	0	—		—		5	0
Billericay Town	2020–21	National League South	3	0	1	0	—		—		4	0
Career total			575	14	39	1	23	1	19	0	658	16

== Honours ==
Charlton Athletic

- Football League First Division: 1999–2000

West Ham United

- FA Cup runner-up: 2005–06

Fulham

- UEFA Europa League runner-up: 2009–10

Leicester City

- Football League Championship: 2013–14

Billericay Town

- Isthmian League Premier Division: 2017–18
