= 2010–11 Leicester City F.C. season =

106th season in existence of Leicester City

Leicester City
2010–11 season
- Chairman: Milan Mandarić (until 30 November); Vichai Raksriaksorn (from 10 February)
- Manager: Paulo Sousa (until 1 October); Chris Powell and Mike Stowell (caretakers); Sven-Göran Eriksson (from 3 October)
- Stadium: Walkers Stadium
- Football League Championship: 10th
- FA Cup: Third round proper
- League Cup: Fourth round
- Top goalscorer: League: Andy King (15); All: Andy King (16)
- Highest home attendance: 30,919 (vs. Leeds United, Championship, 26 December 2010)
- Lowest home attendance: 6,142 (vs. Macclesfield Town, League Cup, 10 August 2010)
Home colours	Away colours	Third colours

The 2010–11 season was Leicester City F.C.'s 106th season in the English football league system and their 59th (non-consecutive) season in the second tier of English football. They played their second consecutive season in the Football League Championship after being promoted from League One in the 2008–09 season.

After two seasons in charge, Nigel Pearson left the club in the summer to take the vacant managerial position at Hull City. Former Portuguese international Paulo Sousa was named as Pearson's replacement, joining from Swansea City to become Leicester's first ever non-British or Irish manager. However, he was sacked after just nine league games in charge, after a dreadful start saw Leicester sit bottom of the league. Chris Powell and Mike Stowell took temporary charge, before former England manager Sven-Göran Eriksson was announced as Leicester boss on 3 October.

Leicester's form improved under Eriksson and a good run after the new year saw Leicester reach 7th place and briefly flirt with hopes of reaching the play-offs, however a run of just 2 wins in 11 league games between 22 February-22 April saw these hopes all but extinguished and Leicester eventually ended up finishing mid-table.

== Pre-season ==
=== Pre-season events ===
Note: This section does not include close season transfers or pre-season match results, which are listed in their own sections below.

- 17 May 2010 – Aman Verma signs a new contract for an undisclosed length.
- 25 May 2010 – It is announced that chairman Milan Mandarić will be facing a second charge for tax evasion for his time at Portsmouth, after a previous charge of cheating the public revenue.
- 28 May 2010 – Andy King signs a new four-year deal.
- 10 June 2010 – Reserve team manager Gerry Taggart joins Oldham Athletic as assistant manager.
- 25 June 2010 – Nolberto Solano announces that he will retire at the end of the season.
- 29 June 2010 – Manager Nigel Pearson leaves the club to join Hull City on a 3-year contract.
- 30 June 2010 – Chris Powell is put in temporary charge of the club as caretaker manager.
- 7 July 2010 – Paulo Sousa is announced as Leicester's 11th permanent manager in ten years after joining from Swansea City
- 13 July 2010 – It is announced that Chris Powell has retired as a professional footballer, though he still remains a member of the club's coaching staff.

=== Kit and sponsorship ===
On 12 July 2010, the club announced a three-year deal with Swiss company BURRDA as the official kit supplier. The kit remained without a sponsor for the 2010–11 season and featured a tradition royal blue and white home kit, with an all-yellow away kit and a black third kit with a sky blue sash.

=== Friendlies ===
14 July 2010 1	Jagiellonia Białystok	4–1	Leicester City	Slovenia
	Grosicki 2 Frankowski 2	(Report)	Campbell	Stadium: Unknown; Attendance: Unknown; Referee: Unknown

16 July 2010 2	NK Aluminij	2–5	Leicester City	Slovenia
		(Report)	Campbell; 2 Howard; Fryatt; Črnčič	Stadium: Unknown; Attendance: Unknown; Referee: Unknown

20 July 2010 3	Rotherham United	1–2	Leicester City	Sheffield
19:45 BST	Le Fondre 18'	(Report)	12' Gallagher; 60' Campbell	Stadium: Don Valley Stadium; Attendance: 1,131; Referee: C Pawson

24 July 2010 4	Oxford United	1–1	Leicester City	Oxford
15:00 BST	Constable 74'	(Report)	19' Campbell	Stadium: Kassam Stadium; Attendance: 2,770; Referee: J Farries

27 July 2010 5	Peterborough United	1–5	Leicester City	Peterborough
19:45 BST	McCann 83'	(Report)	19' King; 27' Campbell; 53' N'Guessan; 81', 90' Howard	Stadium: London Road Stadium; Attendance: c. 1,500; Referee: K Hill

31 July 2010 6	Leicester City	1–2	Sunderland	Leicester
15:00 BST	King 16'	(Report)	6' Campbell; 49' Henderson	Stadium: Walkers Stadium; Attendance: 7,935; Referee: Unknown

== Events ==
Note:This section does not include transfers or match results, which are listed in their own sections below.

- 12 August 2010 – A takeover of the club by an international consortium is finalised.
- 25 August 2010 – The takeover of the club announced 13 days previous has not yet been ratified by The Football League as the owners have not passed a "fit and proper persons" test.
- 23 September 2010 – Lloyd Dyer signs a new four-year contract.
- 1 October 2010 – Paulo Sousa is sacked as manager after just nine league games in charge.
- 3 October 2010 – Sven-Göran Eriksson is named as new manager.
- 4 October 2010 – Leicester City fly to Bangkok for a week long tour of Thailand during an International break in the season. A friendly is arranged against the Thailand National Football Team
- 21 October 2010 – Steve Howard extends his contract to June 2012.
- 22 October 2010 – The takeover by Thai-based consortium Asia Football Investments is officially ratified by The Football League.
- 30 November 2010 – Milan Mandarić resigns as club chairman.
- 14 January 2011 – Chris Powell, the club's first team coach, joins Charlton Athletic as manager
- 20 January 2011 – Bruno Berner signs a one-year contract extension.
- 3 February 2011 – Dietmar Hamann is recruited as first team coach.
- 10 February 2011 – Vichai Raksriaksorn is named as the new chairman.
- 14 March 2011 – Jeffrey Schlupp signs a new contract until June 2013.
- 15 Match 2011 – Paul Gallagher signs a new contract until 2015.
- 17 March 2011 – Academy players Adam Smith and George Taft sign professional deals.
- 18 March 2011 – Richie Wellens signs new contract until 2014.
- 24 March 2011 – Matt Oakley signs a new contract until 2012.
- 7 April 2011 – Franck Moussa signs new contract until 2013.
- 15 April 2011 – Andy King signs a one-year contract extension keeping him at the club until 2015.

== Club ==
=== Current squad ===
As of 26 April 2011. Note: This is the squad that Leicester finished the season with

Note: Flags indicate national team as defined under FIFA eligibility rules; some limited exceptions apply. Players may hold more than one non-FIFA nationality.

No.	Pos.	Nation	Player
1	GK	ENG	Chris Weale
3	DF	BUL	Aleksandar Tunchev
4	DF	NED	Patrick van Aanholt (on loan from Chelsea)
5	DF	POR	Miguel Vítor (on loan from Benfica)
6	MF	POR	Moreno
7	FW	SCO	Paul Gallagher
8	MF	ENG	Matt Oakley (Captain)
9	FW	SCO	Steve Howard
10	MF	WAL	Andy King (Vice-captain)
11	MF	ENG	Lloyd Dyer
12	DF	NED	Jeffrey Bruma (on loan from Chelsea)
14	FW	ENG	Martyn Waghorn
15	DF	SUI	Bruno Berner
16	DF	ENG	Kyle Naughton (on loan from Tottenham Hotspur)

No.	Pos.	Nation	Player
19	MF	ENG	Richie Wellens
20	DF	NED	Michael Lamey
22	MF	JPN	Yuki Abe
24	FW	NGR	Yakubu (on loan from Everton)
29	DF	ENG	Liam Moore
33	FW	SLO	Leon Črnčič
34	DF	CIV	Sol Bamba
35	GK	POR	Ricardo
36	DF	ENG	Ben Mee (on loan from Manchester City)
37	FW	ENG	Darius Vassell
39	FW	SEN	Diomansy Kamara (on loan from Fulham)
40	GK	ENG	Adam Smith
41	GK	HUN	Róbert Ambrusics

==== Out on loan ====
Note: Flags indicate national team as defined under FIFA eligibility rules; some limited exceptions apply. Players may hold more than one non-FIFA nationality.

No.	Pos.	Nation	Player
2	DF	SCO	Robbie Neilson (at Brentford)
13	GK	IRL	Conrad Logan (at Bristol Rovers)
17	FW	FRA	Dany N'Guessan (at Southampton)
18	DF	ENG	Tom Kennedy (at Peterborough United)
23	MF	BEL	Franck Moussa (at Doncaster Rovers)
25	DF	ENG	Jack Hobbs (at Hull City)
26	DF	ENG	Tom Parkes (at Burton Albion)

No.	Pos.	Nation	Player
27	MF	ENG	Jorrin John (at Kettering Town)
28	FW	ENG	Ashley Chambers (at York City)
30	MF	ENG	Aman Verma (at Darlington)
31	FW	GER	Jeffrey Schlupp (at Brentford)
—	DF	IRL	Cian Bolger (at Bristol Rovers)
—	FW	FRA	Yann Kermorgant (at Arles-Avignon)
—	DF	ENG	Luke O'Neill (at Kettering Town)

=== Backroom staff ===
Position	Name
Manager	(Sweden) Sven-Göran Eriksson
Assistant manager	(England) Derek Fazackerley
First team coach	(Germany) Dietmar Hamann
Goalkeeping coach	(England) Mike Stowell
Physio	(England) David Rennie
Academy manager	(England) Jon Rudkin
Academy coaches	(England) Steve Beaglehole (under-18)
Academy coaches	(England) Trevor Peake (under-16)

== Transfers ==
=== In ===
Date	Pos.	Nat.	Name	From	Fee
1 July 2010	DF	(Northern Ireland)	Joe Jones	(England) Arsenal	Free
1 July 2010	DF	(England)	Tom Kennedy	(England) Rochdale	Free
2 August 2010	FW	(Slovenia)	Leon Crnčič	(Italy) Atalanta	Free
5 August 2010	MF	(Portugal)	Moreno	(Portugal) Vitória de Guimarães	Undisclosed
9 August 2010	DF	(Netherlands)	Michael Lamey	(Germany) Arminia Bielefeld	Free
13 August 2010	MF	(Belgium)	Franck Moussa	(England) Southend United	Free
26 August 2010	MF	(Japan)	Yuki Abe	(Japan) Urawa Red Diamonds	Undisclosed
31 August 2010	FW	(England)	Martyn Waghorn	(England) Sunderland	£2,000,000+
20 October 2010	FW	(England)	Darius Vassell	Unattached	Free
2 January 2011	DF	(Ivory Coast)	Sol Bamba	(Scotland) Hibernian	Undisclosed
29 January 2011	GK	(Portugal)	Ricardo	Unattached	Free

=== Out ===
Date	Pos.	Nat.	Name	To	Fee
1 July 2010	MF	(Australia)	James Wesolowski	(England) Peterborough United	Undisclosed
6 July 2010	DF	(England)	Wayne Brown	(England) Preston North End	Free
7 July 2010	MF	(Peru)	Nolberto Solano	(England) Hull City	Free
19 August 2010	MF	(Wales)	Nicky Adams	(England) Brentford	Undisclosed
31 August 2010	FW	(England)	DJ Campbell	(England) Blackpool	£1,250,000
1 January 2011	FW	(England)	Matty Fryatt	(England) Hull City	£1,200,000+
7 January 2011	DF	(England)	Michael Morrison	(England) Sheffield Wednesday	Undisclosed

=== Loans in ===
Date from	Date to	Pos.	Nat.	Name	From
8 July 2010	End of season	DF	(Portugal)	Miguel Vítor	(Portugal) Benfica
26 August 2010	September 2010	GK	(Nigeria)	Carl Ikeme	(England) Wolverhampton Wanderers
14 October 2010	End of season	DF	(England)	Kyle Naughton	(England) Tottenham Hotspur
15 October 2010	November 2010	DF	(England)	Curtis Davies	(England) Aston Villa
21 October 2010	January 2011	DF	(Republic of Ireland)	Greg Cunningham	(England) Manchester City
24 November 2010	January 2011	FW	(Czech Republic)	Roman Bednář	(England) West Bromwich Albion
25 November 2010	January 2011	GK	(England)	Chris Kirkland	(England) Wigan Athletic
1 January 2011	End of season	DF	(England)	Ben Mee	(England) Manchester City
13 January 2011	End of season	FW	(Nigeria)	Yakubu	(England) Everton
26 January 2011	End of season	DF	(Netherlands)	Patrick van Aanholt	(England) Chelsea
29 January 2011	End of season	FW	(Nigeria)	Danny Uchechi	(Nigeria) FC Dender
11 February 2011	End of season	DF	(Netherlands)	Jeffrey Bruma	(England) Chelsea
21 March 2011	End of season	FW	(Senegal)	Diomansy Kamara	(England) Fulham

=== Loans out ===
Date from	Date to	Pos.	Nat.	Name	To
23 July 2010	End of season	FW	(France)	Yann Kermorgant	(France) Arles-Avignon
27 August 2010	27 September 2010	MF	(England)	Aman Verma	(England) Kidderminster Harriers
1 November 2010	1 January 2011	DF	(England)	Tom Kennedy	(England) Rochdale
11 November 2010	11 January 2011	FW	(Scotland)	Craig King	(England) Northampton Town
12 November 2010	January 2011	FW	(England)	Ashley Chambers	(England) York City
12 November 2010	12 December 2010	FW	(France)	Dany N'Guessan	(England) Scunthorpe United
19 November 2010	End of season	MF	(England)	Aman Verma	(England) Darlington
25 November 2010	January 2011	DF	(England)	Tom Parkes	(England) Yeovil Town
12 December 2010	January 2011	GK	(Hungary)	Róbert Ambrusics	(England) Stafford Rangers
1 January 2011	29 January 2011	FW	(Tanzania)	Adi Yussuf	(England) Tamworth
17 January 2011	17 February 2011	DF	(Republic of Ireland)	Cian Bolger	(England) Bristol Rovers
20 January 2011	End of season	DF	(England)	Tom Kennedy	(England) Peterborough United
26 January 2011	End of season	FW	(France)	Dany N'Guessan	(England) Southampton
29 January 2011	1 March 2011	DF	(England)	Luke O'Neill	(England) Kettering Town
9 February 2011	9 March 2011	MF	(England)	Jorrin John	(England) Kettering Town
15 February 2011	End of season	DF	(England)	Jack Hobbs	(England) Hull City
17 February 2011	17 April 2011	DF	(Scotland)	Robbie Neilson	(England) Brentford
19 February 2011	End of season	GK	(Republic of Ireland)	Conrad Logan	(England) Bristol Rovers
21 February 2011	21 April 2011	MF	(Belgium)	Franck Moussa	(England) Doncaster Rovers
14 March 2011	14 April 2011	FW	(Germany)	Jeffrey Schlupp	(England) Brentford
24 March 2011	End of season	DF	(England)	Tom Parkes	(England) Burton Albion

=== Released ===
Date	Pos.	Nat.	Name	To
30 June 2010	MF	(England)	Stephen Clemence	Retired
30 June 2010	FW	(Northern Ireland)	Billy Kee	(England) Torquay United
30 June 2010	GK	(Australia)	Alex Cisak	(England) Accrington Stanley
30 June 2010	GK	(England)	Carl Pentney	(England) Colchester United
30 June 2010	MF	(England)	Robbie Burns	(England) Nuneaton Town
30 June 2010	MF	(England)	Levi Porter	Free
30 June 2010	MF	(Sweden)	Astrit Ajdarević	(Sweden) Örebro SK
14 July 2010	DF	(England)	Harry Worley	(England) Oxford United

== Results ==
Win Draw Loss Upcoming fixture

=== Football League Championship ===
7 August 2010 1	Crystal Palace	3–2	Leicester City	London
15:00 BST	Zaha 19'; Ambrose 26'; Lee 41'	(Report)	57' King; 84' Campbell	Stadium: Selhurst Park; Attendance: 17,486; Referee: Andy Woolmer

14 August 2010 2	Leicester City	0–0	Middlesbrough	Leicester
15:00 BST		(Report)		Stadium: Walkers Stadium; Attendance: 21,587; Referee: Marc Jones

21 August 2010 3	Burnley	3–0	Leicester City	Burnley
15:00 BST	Wallace 45+2'; Iwelumo 62'; Alexander 74' (pen.)	(Report)		Stadium: Turf Moor; Attendance: 15,516; Referee: Geoff Eltringham

28 August 2010 4	Leicester City	1–2	Reading	Leicester
17:20 BST	Dyer 52'	(Report)	22' Sigurðsson; 86' Mills	Stadium: Walkers Stadium; Attendance: 19,611; Referee: Colin Webster

11 September 2010 5	Coventry City	1–1	Leicester City	Coventry
12:30 BST	Platt 41'	(Report)	76' King	Stadium: Ricoh Arena; Attendance: 15,516; Referee: Anthony Taylor

14 September 2010 6	Leicester City	2–1	Cardiff City	Leicester
19:45 BST	King 51', 68'	(Report)	26' Naylor	Stadium: Walkers Stadium; Attendance: 20,510; Referee: Karl Evans

18 September 2010 7	Leicester City	0–2	Queens Park Rangers	Leicester
15:00 BST		(Report)	12', 86' Mackie	Stadium: Walkers Stadium; Attendance: 22,968; Referee: G Scott

24 September 2010 8	Portsmouth	6–1	Leicester City	Portsmouth
19:45 BST	Lawrence 10' (pen.), 33'; Nugent 58'; Kitson 5', 83'; Brown 90+1'	(Report)	71' Howard; (red card) 31' Vítor	Stadium: Fratton Park; Attendance: 13,751; Referee: Keith Hill

28 September 2010 9	Norwich City	4–3	Leicester City	Norwich
19:45 BST	Crofts 31'; Hoolahan 53' (pen.), 74'; Drury 62'	(Report)	2' Waghorn; 65', 78' Fryatt; (red card) 80' Fryatt	Stadium: Carrow Road; Attendance: 25,091; Referee: Peter Walton

2 October 2010 10	Leicester City	3–1	Scunthorpe United	Leicester
15:00 BST	Waghorn 10'; Dyer 54'; Moussa 90+3'	(Report)	60' O'Connor	Stadium: Walkers Stadium; Attendance: 20,652; Referee: G K Hegley

16 October 2010 11	Leicester City	1–1	Hull City	Leicester
15:00 BST	King 3'	(Report)	52' Koren	Stadium: Walkers Stadium; Attendance: 23,766; Referee: N Miller

19 October 2010 12	Leeds United	1–2	Leicester City	Leeds
20:00 BST	Becchio 83'	(Report)	63' Naughton; 81' Howard	Stadium: Elland Road; Attendance: 22,775; Referee: Whitestone

23 October 2010 13	Swansea City	2–0	Leicester City	Swansea, Wales
15:00 BST	Emnes 50' Sinclair 90+4'	(Report)		Stadium: Liberty Stadium; Attendance: 14,651; Referee: Keith Stroud

30 October 2010 14	Leicester City	1–0	Preston North End	Leicester
15:00 GMT	Gallagher 36'	(Report)		Stadium: Walkers Stadium; Attendance: 21,212; Referee: Gavin Ward

6 November 2010 15	Barnsley	0–2	Leicester City	Barnsley
15:00 GMT		(Report)	50' Vítor; 85' King	Stadium: Oakwell; Attendance: 12,360; Referee: N Swarbrick

10 November 2010 16	Leicester City	2–2	Sheffield United	Leicester
19:45 GMT	Gallagher 8'; Howard 90+2' (pen.)	(Report)	29', 41' Yeates	Stadium: Walkers Stadium; Attendance: 20,445; Referee: Phil Gibbs

13 November 2010 17	Leicester City	2–0	Derby County	Leicester
15:00 GMT	King 13'; Howard 71' (pen.)	(Report)		Stadium: Walkers Stadium; Attendance: 25,930; Referee: Tanner

20 November 2010 18	Bristol City	2–0	Leicester City	Bristol
15:00 GMT	Pitman 57'; Clarkson 90+2'	(Report)		Stadium: Ashton Gate; Attendance: 14,517; Referee: C Pawson

29 November 2010 19	Leicester City	1–0	Nottingham Forest	Leicester
19:45 GMT	King 59'	(Report)		Stadium: Walkers Stadium; Attendance: 24,659; Referee: Michael Oliver

4 December 2010 20	Watford	3–2	Leicester City	London
15:00 GMT	Eustace 15'; Buckley 22'; Grahem 85'	(Report)	50' (pen.), 69' Gallagher	Stadium: Vicarage Road; Attendance: 14,449; Referee: K Wright

11 December 2010 21	Leicester City	5–1	Doncaster Rovers	Leicester
15:00 GMT	Gallagher 45+2' (pen.); Wellens 61'; Naughton 69'; Vassell 75'; Waghorn 90+4'	(Report)	6' Sharp	Stadium: Walkers Stadium; Attendance: 27,549; Referee: J Linington

19 December 2010 22	Ipswich Town	3–0	Leicester City	Ipswich
15:00 GMT	Norris 6'; Scotland 27', 39'	(Report)		Stadium: Portman Road; Attendance: 16,728; Referee: Stuart Attwell

26 December 2010 23	Leicester City	2–2	Leeds United	Leicester
15:00 GMT	Gallagher 72' (pen.); King 76'	(Report)	Gradel 19'; Snodgrass 55'	Stadium: Walkers Stadium; Attendance: 30,919; Referee: Bates

28 December 2010 24	Millwall	2–0	Leicester City	London
15:00 GMT	Morison 12'; Puncheon 25'	Report		Stadium: The Den; Attendance: 12,188; Referee: Mick Russell

1 January 2011 25	Hull City	0–1	Leicester City	Kingston upon Hull
15:00 GMT		Report	Vassell 11'	Stadium: KC Stadium; Attendance: 22,410; Referee: Howard Webb

3 January 2011 26	Leicester City	2–1	Swansea City	Leicester
15:00 GMT	Berner 6'; Vassell 43'	Report	12' Sinclair	Stadium: Walkers Stadium; Attendance: 21,656; Referee: D Deadman

15 January 2011 27	Preston North End	1–1	Leicester City	Preston
15:00 GMT	Hume 90+1'	Report	60' Yakubu	Stadium: Deepdale; Attendance: 14,205; Referee: D Coote

22 January 2011 28	Leicester City	4–2	Millwall	Leicester
15:00 GMT	Dyer 8'; Yakubu 22'; Bamba 35', 74'	Report	9' Henry; 69' (pen.) Smith; (red card) 72' Askou	Stadium: Walkers Stadium; Attendance: 23,347

1 February 2011 29	Sheffield United	0–1	Leicester City	Sheffield
19:45 GMT		Report	4' King	Stadium: Bramall Lane; Attendance: 20,464; Referee: D Webb

5 February 2011 30	Leicester City	4–1	Barnsley	Leicester
15:00 GMT	Gallagher 15'; King 43', 58'; Naughton 89'	Report	45+1' Mellis	Stadium: Walkers Stadium; Attendance: 22,667; Referee: Keith Hill

12 February 2011 31	Derby County	0–2	Leicester City	Derby
17:20 GMT		Report	28' Yakubu; 45+3' King	Stadium: Pride Park; Attendance: 26,142; Referee: C Webster

18 February 2011 32	Leicester City	2–1	Bristol City	Leicester
19:45 GMT	Yakubu 21'; Waghorn 90+2'	Report	57' Elliott	Stadium: Walkers Stadium; Attendance: 28,768; Referee: R J Booth

22 February 2011 33	Cardiff City	2–0	Leicester City	Cardiff
19:45 GMT	Chopra 21'; Ramsey 52'	Report		Stadium: Cardiff City Stadium; Attendance: 22,410; Referee: D McDermidd

26 February 2011 34	Leicester City	1–1	Coventry City	Leicester
15:00 GMT	Naughton 45'	Report	14' King; (yellow card) 90' (red card) Cranie	Stadium: Walkers Stadium; Attendance: 25,356; Referee: G Scott

5 March 2011 35	Queens Park Rangers	1–0	Leicester City	London
15:00 GMT	Miller 88'	Report		Stadium: Loftus Road; Attendance: 18,068; Referee: R East

8 March 2011 36	Leicester City	2–3	Norwich City	Leicester
19:45 GMT	Wellens 23'; Gallagher 90+2'	Report	21' Hoolahan; 49' Holt; 59' Wilbraham	Stadium: Walkers Stadium; Attendance: 23,398; Referee: Chris Foy

12 March 2011 37	Scunthorpe United	0–3	Leicester City	Scunthorpe
15:00 GMT		Report	31', 72' Vítor; 76' Naughton	Stadium: Glanford Park; Attendance: 6,528; Referee: Rob Shoebridge

19 March 2011 38	Leicester City	0–1	Portsmouth	Leicester
15:00 GMT		Report	13' Nugent	Stadium: Walkers Stadium; Attendance: 26,645; Referee: Paul Tierney

2 April 2011 39	Middlesbrough	3–3	Leicester City	Middlesbrough
15:00 BST	Emnes 14'; R. Williams 55'; McManus 90+4'	Report	5', 45+3', 49' Yakubu; (yellow card) 77' (red card) Bruma	Stadium: Riverside Stadium; Attendance: 14,500; Referee: A Haines

9 April 2011 40	Leicester City	4–0	Burnley	Leicester
15:00 BST	Kamara 23'; Gallagher 52' (pen.), 71'; Van Aanholt 81'	Report		Stadium: Walkers Stadium; Attendance: 24.039; Referee: Mike Dean

12 April 2011 41	Leicester City	1–1	Crystal Palace	Leicester
19:45 BST	Oakley 58'	Report	31' Scannell; (red card) 90+7' Zaha	Stadium: Walkers Stadium; Attendance: 22,303; Referee: Iain Williamson

16 April 2011 42	Reading	3–1	Leicester City	Reading
15:00 BST	Kébé 19'; McAnuff 21'; Hunt 67'	Report	79' King	Stadium: Madejski Stadium; Attendance: 19,199; Referee: G Salisbury

22 April 2011 43	Nottingham Forest	3–2	Leicester City	Nottingham
17:15 BST	Tudgay 15'; Earnshaw 73'; McKenna 84'	Report	20' Oakley; 74' Vassell	Stadium: City Ground; Attendance: 24,217; Referee: Mark Clattenburg

25 April 2011 44	Leicester City	4–2	Watford	Leicester
15:00 BST	Bruma 39', 73'; Yakubu 62', 75'	Report	28', 41' Sordell	Stadium: Walkers Stadium; Attendance: 21,473; Referee: A Bates

30 April 2011 45	Doncaster Rovers	1–1	Leicester City	Doncaster
15:00 BST	Brooker 50'	Report	76' Yakubu	Stadium: Keepmoat Stadium; Attendance: 11,757; Referee: Darren Deadman

7 May 2011 46	Leicester City	4–2	Ipswich Town	Leicester
12:45 BST	King 26'; Yakubu 42'; Abe 45+2'; Kamara 72'	Report	69' (pen.) Leadbitter; 70' Wickham	Stadium: Walkers Stadium; Attendance: 24,859; Referee: C Boyeson

=== FA Cup ===
9 January 2011 R3 Proper	Leicester City	2–2	Manchester City	Leicester
16:00 GMT	Bamba 1'; King 64'	Report	23' Milner; 45' Tevez	Stadium: Walkers Stadium; Attendance: 31,200; Referee: Mike Dean

18 January 2011 R3 Proper Replay	Manchester City	4–2	Leicester City	Manchester
19:45 GMT	Tevez 15'; Vieira 37'; Johnson 39'; Kolarov 90'	Report	Gallagher 19' (pen.); Dyer 83'	Stadium: City of Manchester Stadium; Attendance: 27,755; Referee: Mark Halsey

=== League Cup ===
10 August 2010 R1	Leicester City	4–3	Macclesfield Town	Leicester
19:45 BST	Neilson 35'; Fryatt 47', 51'; Wellens 70'	(Report)	15' Brown; 64' Mukendi; 83' Daniel	Stadium: Walkers Stadium; Attendance: 6,142; Referee: J Waugh

24 August 2010 R2	Leeds United	1–2	Leicester City	Leeds
19:45 BST	Somma 32'	(Report)	66' Wellens; 89' (pen.) Howard	Stadium: Elland Road; Attendance: 16,509; Referee: E Ilderton

21 September 2010 R3	Portsmouth	1–2	Leicester City	Portsmouth
19:45 BST	Lawrence 82'	(Report)	3' Morrison; 43' Dyer	Stadium: Fratton Park; Attendance: 8,327; Referee: F Graham

26 October 2010 R4	Leicester City	1–4	West Bromwich Albion	Leicester
19:45 BST	Shorey 53' (o.g.)	(Report)	Cox 21', 90'; Tchoyi 62'; Reid 79'	Stadium: Walkers Stadium; Attendance: 16,957; Referee: Taylor

=== Friendlies ===
9 October 2010	Thailand	0–2	Leicester City	Bangkok, Thailand
18:00 UTC+7		(Report)	9' Waghorn; 34' Gallagher	Stadium: Suphachalasai Stadium; Attendance: Unknown; Referee: Sura Sriart

== Awards ==
=== Club awards ===
At the end of the season, Leicester's annual award ceremony, including categories voted for by the players and backroom staff, the supporters and the supporters club, saw the following players recognised for their achievements for the club throughout the 2010-11 season.

Player of the Year	(England) Richie Wellens
Players' Player of the Year	(Wales) Andy King
Media Player of the Year	(England) Richie Wellens
Goal of the Year	(Nigeria) Yakubu (vs. Derby County, 12 February 2011)
Young Player of the Year	(England) Kyle Naughton
Academy Player of the Year	(Germany) Jeffrey Schlupp
Golden Boot	(Wales) Andy King

=== Divisional awards ===
Date	Award	Winner
January 2011	Championship Player of the Month	(England) Richie Wellens
Season	PFA Team of the Year	(England) Kyle Naughton
Season	PFA Team of the Year	(Wales) Andy King

== Championship statistics ==
=== Championship table ===
Pos	Team	Pld	W	D	L	GF	GA	GD	Pts
8	Burnley	46	18	14	14	65	61	+4	68
9	Millwall	46	18	13	15	62	48	+14	67
10	Leicester City	46	19	10	17	76	71	+5	67
11	Hull City	46	16	17	13	52	51	+1	65
12	Middlesbrough	46	17	11	18	68	68	0	62

Updated to match(es) played on 7 May 2011. Source: The Football League
Rules for classification: 1) points; 2) goal difference; 3) number of goals scored.

=== Club standings ===
Overall								Home						Away					
Pld	W	D	L	GF	GA	GD	Pts	W	D	L	GF	GA	GD	W	D	L	GF	GA	GD
46	19	10	17	76	71	+5	67	13	6	4	48	27	+21	6	4	13	28	44	−16

Last updated: 7 May 2011.
Source: LCFC Championship Results

==== Results by round ====
Round	1	2	3	4	5	6	7	8	9	10	11	12	13	14	15	16	17	18	19	20	21	22	23	24	25	26	27	28	29	30	31	32	33	34	35	36	37	38	39	40	41	42	43	44	45	46
Ground	A	H	A	H	A	H	H	A	A	H	H	A	A	H	A	H	H	A	H	A	H	A	H	A	A	H	A	H	A	H	A	H	A	H	A	H	A	H	A	H	H	A	A	H	A	H
Result	L	D	L	L	D	W	L	L	L	W	D	W	L	W	W	D	W	L	W	L	W	L	D	L	W	W	D	W	W	W	W	W	L	D	L	L	W	L	D	W	D	L	L	W	D	W
Position	14	16	24	23	23	20	22	23	24	22	22	20	21	19	17	17	15	17	14	16	13	16	17	17	14	12	13	10	10	8	7	7	7	7	9	10	9	11	12	9	9	10	11	11	11	10

Updated to match(es) played on 7 May 2011. Source: Competitive Matches
A = Away; H = Home; W = Win; D = Draw; L = Loss

== Club statistics ==
All data from football-league.co.uk

=== Appearances ===
- Starts + Substitute appearances.
- Italics indicates loan player.
- Asterisk indicates player left the club mid-season.

No.	Pos	Nat	Player	Total		Championship		FA Cup		League Cup	
No.	Pos	Nat	Player	Apps	Goals	Apps	Goals	Apps	Goals	Apps	Goals
1	GK	(England) ENG	Chris Weale	31	0	28+1	0	2	0	0	0
2	DF	(Scotland) SCO	Robbie Neilson	11	1	7	0	0+1	0	2+1	1
3	DF	(Bulgaria) BUL	Aleksander Tunchev	2	0	0+2	0	0	0	0	0
4	DF	(England) ENG	Michael Morrison*	15	1	10+1	0	0	0	3+1	1
4	DF	(Netherlands) NED	Patrick van Aanholt	12	1	12	1	0	0	0	0
5	DF	(Portugal) POR	Miguel Vítor	17	3	13+2	3	0	0	2	0
6	MF	(Portugal) POR	Moreno	6	0	3	0	0	0	3	0
7	FW	(Scotland) SCO	Paul Gallagher	47	11	32+9	10	2	1	4	0
8	MF	(England) ENG	Matt Oakley	36	2	22+12	2	0+1	0	1	0
9	FW	(Scotland) SCO	Steve Howard	35	5	11+18	4	1+1	0	4	1
10	MF	(Wales) WAL	Andy King	50	16	44+1	15	2	1	2+1	0
11	FW	(England) ENG	Lloyd Dyer	39	5	18+17	3	2	1	2	1
12	FW	(England) ENG	Matty Fryatt*	14	4	5+7	2	0	0	1+1	2
12	DF	(Netherlands) NED	Jeffrey Bruma	11	2	10+1	2	0	0	0	0
13	GK	(Republic of Ireland) IRL	Conrad Logan	7	0	2+1	0	0	0	4	0
14	FW	(England) ENG	Martyn Waghorn	33	4	11+19	4	0+2	0	0+1	0
15	DF	(Switzerland) SUI	Bruno Berner	21	1	15+2	1	2	0	2	0
16	MF	(Wales) WAL	Nicky Adams*	0	0	0	0	0	0	0	0
16	DF	(England) ENG	Kyle Naughton	38	5	34	5	2	0	2	0
17	FW	(France) FRA	Dany N'Guessan	8	0	3+2	0	0	0	2+1	0
18	DF	(England) ENG	Tom Kennedy	4	0	1	0	0	0	2+1	0
19	MF	(England) ENG	Richie Wellens	51	4	44+1	2	2	0	2+2	2
20	DF	(Netherlands) NED	Michael Lamey	7	0	2+2	0	0	0	2+1	0
21	GK	(Nigeria) NGR	Carl Ikeme*	5	0	5	0	0	0	0	0
21	GK	(England) ENG	Chris Kirkland*	3	0	3	0	0	0	0	0
22	MF	(Japan) JPN	Yuki Abe	40	1	25+11	1	2	0	2	0
23	MF	(Belgium) BEL	Franck Moussa	12	1	2+6	1	0+1	0	2+1	0
24	DF	(England) ENG	Curtis Davies*	12	0	12	0	0	0	0	0
24	FW	(Nigeria) NGR	Yakubu	20	11	19+1	11	0	0	0	0
25	DF	(England) ENG	Jack Hobbs	30	0	23+3	0	2	0	2	0
26	DF	(England) ENG	Tom Parkes	0	0	0	0	0	0	0	0
27	MF	(England) ENG	Jorrin John	0	0	0	0	0	0	0	0
28	FW	(England) ENG	Ashley Chambers	0	0	0	0	0	0	0	0
29	DF	(England) ENG	Liam Moore	0	0	0	0	0	0	0	0
30	MF	(England) ENG	Aman Verma	1	0	0	0	0	0	0+1	0
31	FW	(Germany) GER	Jeffrey Schlupp	0	0	0	0	0	0	0	0
32	FW	(England) ENG	DJ Campbell*	4	1	3	1	0	0	0+1	0
32	DF	(Republic of Ireland) IRL	Greg Cunningham*	13	0	13	0	0	0	0	0
33	FW	(Slovenia) SLO	Leon Crnčič	0	0	0	0	0	0	0	0
34	DF	(Ivory Coast) CIV	Sol Bamba	18	3	16	2	2	1	0	0
35	GK	(Portugal) POR	Ricardo	8	0	8	0	0	0	0	0
36	DF	(England) ENG	Ben Mee	15	0	15	0	0	0	0	0
37	FW	(England) ENG	Darius Vassell	33	4	26+5	4	2	0	0	0
39	FW	(Czech Republic) CZE	Roman Bednář*	7	0	4+1	0	2	0	0	0
39	FW	(Senegal) SEN	Diomansy Kamara	7	2	5+2	2	0	0	0	0
40	GK	(England) ENG	Adam Smith	0	0	0	0	0	0	0	0
41	GK	(Hungary) HUN	Robert Ambrusics	0	0	0	0	0	0	0	0

=== Top scorers ===
Pos.	Nat.	Name	FLC	FAC	LC	Total
1	(Wales)	Andy King	15	1	0	16
2	(Nigeria)	Yakubu	11	0	0	11
=	(Scotland)	Paul Gallagher	10	1	0	11
4	(England)	Kyle Naughton	5	0	0	5
=	(Scotland)	Steve Howard	4	0	1	5
=	(England)	Lloyd Dyer	3	1	1	5
7	(England)	Darius Vassell	4	0	0	4
=	(England)	Martyn Waghorn	4	0	0	4
=	(England)	Matty Fryatt	2	0	2	4
=	(England)	Richie Wellens	2	0	2	4
11	(Portugal)	Miguel Vítor	3	0	0	3
=	(Ivory Coast)	Sol Bamba	2	1	0	3
13	(Netherlands)	Jeffrey Bruma	2	0	0	2
=	(Senegal)	Diomansy Kamara	2	0	0	2
=	(England)	Matt Oakley	2	0	0	2
16	(Japan)	Yuki Abe	1	0	0	1
=	(Switzerland)	Bruno Berner	1	0	0	1
=	(England)	DJ Campbell	1	0	0	1
=	(Belgium)	Franck Moussa	1	0	0	1
=	(Netherlands)	Patrick van Aanholt	1	0	0	1
=	(England)	Michael Morrison	0	0	1	1
=	(Scotland)	Robbie Neilson	0	0	1	1
Own goals			0	0	1	1

=== Most assists ===
Pos.	Nat.	Name	FLC	FAC	LC	Total
1	(England)	Richie Wellens	8	0	1	9
=	(Scotland)	Paul Gallagher	7	1	1	9
3	(Wales)	Andy King	5	0	1	6
4	(Nigeria)	Yakubu	5	0	0	5
=	(Scotland)	Steve Howard	3	0	2	5
6	(England)	Lloyd Dyer	2	1	1	4
7	(Japan)	Yuki Abe	2	1	0	3
8	(England)	Ben Mee	2	0	0	2
=	(England)	Darius Vassell	2	0	0	2
10	(Scotland)	Robbie Neilson	1	0	0	1
=	(France)	Dany N'Guessan	1	0	0	1
=	(Czech Republic)	Roman Bednář	1	0	0	1
=	(Ivory Coast)	Sol Bamba	1	0	0	1
=	(Switzerland)	Bruno Berner	1	0	0	1
=	(Netherlands)	Jeffrey Bruma	1	0	0	1
=	(England)	Kyle Naughton	1	0	0	1

=== Disciplinary record ===
Note: Info on LCFC.com is incomplete, further data retrieved from football-league.co.uk

Nat.	Name	Yellow card	Red card
(Scotland)	Steve Howard	6	0
(England)	Richie Wellens	5	0
(England)	Matt Oakley	5	0
(Ivory Coast)	Sol Bamba	4	0
(Nigeria)	Yakubu	4	0
(Netherlands)	Jeffrey Bruma	3	1
(England)	Martyn Waghorn	3	0
(Switzerland)	Bruno Berner	3	0
(England)	Kyle Naughton	3	0
(England)	Michael Morrison	3	0
(Scotland)	Paul Gallagher	3	0
(Senegal)	Diomansy Kamara	3	0
(Portugal)	Miguel Vítor	2	1
(Japan)	Yuki Abe	2	0
(England)	Curtis Davies	2	0
(Republic of Ireland)	Greg Cunningham	2	0
(England)	Darius Vassell	2	0
(Wales)	Andy King	1	0
(England)	Jack Hobbs	1	0
(England)	Ben Mee	1	0
(England)	Lloyd Dyer	1	0
(Scotland)	Robbie Neilson	1	0
(England)	Matty Fryatt	0	1

=== Overall seasonal record ===
Games played	52 (46 Championship, 2 FA Cup, 4 League Cup)
Games won	22 (19 Championship, 0 FA Cup, 3 League Cup)
Games drawn	11 (10 Championship, 1 FA Cup, 0 League Cup)
Games lost	19 (17 Championship, 1 FA Cup, 1 League Cup)
Win %	42.31%
Goals scored	89 (76 Championship, 4 FA Cup, 9 League Cup)
Goals conceded	86 (71 Championship, 6 FA Cup, 9 League Cup)
Goal difference	+3 (+5 Championship, -2 FA Cup, 0 League Cup)
Yellow cards	59 (53 Championship, 1 FA Cup, 5 League Cup)
Red cards	3 (3 Championship, 0 FA Cup, 0 League Cup)
Worst discipline	6 Yellows (Steve Howard)
Biggest win	5–1 vs. Doncaster Rovers (Championship 11.12.2010) & 4–0 vs. Burnley (Championship 9.4.2011)
Heaviest defeat	1–6 vs. Portsmouth (Championship, 24.9.2010)
Highest scoring match	4–3 vs. Macclesfield (League Cup, 10.8.2010) & 1–6 vs. Portsmouth (Championship, 24.9.2010)
Most appearances	51 (Richie Wellens)
Top scorer	16 (Andy King)
Most assists	9 (Richie Wellens & Paul Gallagher)
