= 2006–07 Boston United F.C. season =

Boston United
2006–07 season
- Chairman: Jim Rodwell
- Manager: Steve Evans
- League Two: 23 (relegated)
- FA Cup: First Round
- League Cup: First Round
- Top goalscorer: League: Drewe Broughton (8); All: Drewe Broughton (8)
- Highest home attendance: 4327 (v Lincoln)
- Lowest home attendance: 1664 (v Accrington)
- Average home league attendance: 2152
Home colours	Away colours	Third colours

During the,2006–07 season, Boston United F.C. competed in Football League Two, alongside the FA Cup, Football League Cup and Football League Trophy. The season covered the period from 1 July 2006 to 30 June 2007.

== Competitions ==
=== League Two ===
==== League table ====
Pos	Team	Pld	W	D	L	GF	GA	GD	Pts	Promotion, qualification or relegation
20	Accrington Stanley	46	13	11	22	70	81	−11	50	
21	Bury	46	13	11	22	46	61	−15	50	
22	Macclesfield Town	46	12	12	22	55	77	−22	48	
23	Boston United (R)	46	12	10	24	51	80	−29	36 (Note: Boston United had 10 points deducted for entering a Company Voluntary Arrangement. They were relegated directly to the Conference North for not paying their footballing creditors.)	Relegation to Conference North
24	Torquay United (R)	46	7	14	25	36	63	−27	35	Relegation to Football Conference

Rules for classification: In the Football League goals scored (GF) takes precedence over goal difference (GD).
(R) Relegated

=== FA Cup ===
Boston United's score comes first

Round	Date	Opponent	Venue	Result	Attendance	Scorers
First round	11 November 2006	A.F.C. Bournemouth	Away	0–4	4,263	—

=== League Cup ===
Boston United's score comes first

Round	Date	Opponent	Venue	Result	Attendance	Scorers
First round	23 August 2006	Brighton & Hove Albion	Away	0–1	2,533	—

=== Football League Trophy ===
Boston United's score comes first

Round	Date	Opponent	Venue	Result	Attendance	Scorers
First round	17 October 2006	Brighton & Hove Albion	Away	0–2	1,740	—

== End of season squad ==
Note: Flags indicate national team as defined under FIFA eligibility rules; some limited exceptions apply. Players may hold more than one non-FIFA nationality.

No.	Pos.	Nation	Player
1	GK	WAL	Andy Marriott
2	DF	ENG	Lee Canoville (captain)
4	DF	ENG	Paul Ellender (captain)
5	DF	ENG	Mark Greaves
6	MF	ENG	Mark Albrighton
7	MF	ENG	Brad Maylett
9	FW	ENG	Drewe Broughton (on loan from Chester)
10	FW	ENG	Francis Green
12	MF	SCO	Simon Rusk
13	GK	ENG	James Doughty
14	MF	ENG	David Galbraith
14	MF	ENG	David Farrell

No.	Pos.	Nation	Player
16	MF	ENG	Jamie Clarke
17	MF	ENG	Stewart Talbot (vice-captain)
18	DF	ENG	Stephen Vaughan
19	MF	IRL	Richie Ryan
20	DF	ENG	Jamie Stevens
21	FW	ENG	Nathan Forbes
22	DF	ENG	Ben Nunn
23	MF	ENG	Ernie Cooksey
24	DF	ENG	Colin Cryan
27	FW	ENG	Adam Rowntree
28	MF	ENG	Ben Joyce

== Left the club ==
Note: Flags indicate national team as defined under FIFA eligibility rules; some limited exceptions apply. Players may hold more than one non-FIFA nationality.

No.	Pos.	Nation	Player
3	DF	ENG	Tim Ryan (to Darlington)
3	DF	ENG	Shane Nicholson (end of loan from Chesterfield)
8	FW	ENG	Anthony Elding (to Stockport)
8	FW	ENG	Justin Richards (end of loan from Peterborough)
8	FW	ENG	Trevor Benjamin (end of loan from Peterborough)
9	FW	ENG	Julian Joachim (to Darlington)
9	FW	SCO	Robert Davidson (end of loan from Rangers)
11	MF	ENG	Chris Holland (to Southport)
11	MF	ENG	Nathan Joynes (end of loan from Barnsley)
13	GK	ENG	Ben Kirby (left the club)
18	FW	ENG	Paul Tait (to Southport)
22	MF	FRA	Dany N'Guessan (end of loan from Rangers)
22	MF	SLE	Albert Jarrett (end of loan from Watford)
23	MF	ENG	Daniel Cotton (to Blackstones)
24	DF	ENG	Ian Miller (end of loan from Ipswich)
25	DF	ENG	John McCombe (end of loan from Huddersfield)
25	MF	ENG	Jason Kennedy (end of loan from Middlesbrough)
26	DF	ENG	Bradley Thomas (end of loan from Yeovil)
27	MF	ENG	David Rowson (end of loan from Darlington)
