= 2009–10 Leicester City F.C. season =

105th season in existence of Leicester City

Leicester City F.C.
2009–10 season
- Chairman: Milan Mandarić
- Manager: Nigel Pearson
- Stadium: Walkers Stadium
- Football League Championship: 5th
- FA Cup: Fourth round
- League Cup: Second round
- Top goalscorer: League: Martyn Waghorn (12); All: Matty Fryatt (13)
- Highest home attendance: 31,759 (vs. Nottingham Forest, Championship, 27 February 2010)
- Lowest home attendance: 12,307 (vs. Swansea City, FA Cup, 2 January 2010)
- Average home league attendance: 24,542
Home colours	Away colours

The 2009–10 season was Leicester City F.C.'s 105th season in the English football league system and their 58th in the second tier of English football. It was their first season back in the Championship after promotion from League One as champions in 2008–09. It was also the club's 125th anniversary season.

Having just been promoted, Nigel Pearson's side surprised many by spending most of the season in the play-offs. They eventually finished fifth, reaching the play-offs. This was considered an impressive finish and a stride forward by many, considering Leicester were relegated from the same division two seasons previously. They eventually lost out in the play-off semi-finals to Cardiff City on a penalty shoot-out.

== Pre-season ==
After winning League One by seven points, manager Nigel Pearson sought to strengthen the squad ahead of the Championship campaign. 2008–09 loanees Jack Hobbs and Wayne Brown were quickly signed on permanent deals from Liverpool and Hull City respectively. Veterans Barry Hayles, Bruno Ngotty, Paul Henderson, Patrick Kisnorbo and Marc Edworthy were released at the end of their contracts. The Foxes further added to their squad with the captures of goalkeeper Chris Weale, defender Robbie Neilson and midfielders Richie Wellens and Dany N'Guessan. However, the forward line remained unreinforced until 19-year-old Martyn Waghorn arrived on loan from Sunderland just before the opening game against Swansea City.

Joe Mattock, part of the England squad for the European U-19 Championships, handed in a transfer request just 48 hours before the first match of the season. He eventually moved to fellow Championship club West Bromwich Albion for an undisclosed fee.

=== Kit and sponsorship ===
Leicester City's badge for the 2009–10 season.

Leicester City's home kit for the 2009–10 season was unveiled before the final home game of 2008–09 against Scunthorpe United. To mark the 125th anniversary of the club's founding in 1884, the design of the front of the shirt had earlier been put to an online vote, with the fans deciding to keep the home shirt blank and sponsorless. A special badge was created for this kit, to be used for one season only.

The blue and black design of the away kit mirrors the shirts worn in the club's first game in 1884. It is branded with the logo of LOROS, a charity providing hospice care in Leicestershire. The charity will receive a percentage of the sale price of each shirt sold from their shops.

Both strips are manufactured by Joma, following the expiration of the club's previous deal with Jako.

=== Friendlies ===
After reporting back for pre-season training on 1 July, the club remained unbeaten through six pre-season games:

11 July 2009 1	Loughborough Dynamo	1–3	Leicester City	Loughborough
	Johnson	(Report)	Kee; Dickov; Adams	Stadium: Nanpantan Sports Ground; Attendance: 1,000+

13 July 2009 2	Tamworth	1–1	Leicester City	Tamworth
	Wright	(Report)	Berner	Stadium: The Lamb Ground; Attendance: 1,035

21 July 2009 3	Mansfield Town	0–0	Leicester City	Mansfield
		(Report)		Stadium: Field Mill; Referee: R Booth

25 July 2009 4	Shrewsbury Town	0–4	Leicester City	Shrewsbury
		(Report)	Hobbs; Dyer 2 N'Guessan	Stadium: Prostar Stadium; Attendance: 2,030; Referee: S Rushton

28 July 2009 5	Chesterfield	0–1	Leicester City	Chesterfield
		(Report)	N'Guessan	Stadium: Saltergate; Attendance: 1,973; Referee: J Waugh

2 August 2009 6	Leicester City	1–0	Real Valladolid	Leicester
	Fryatt	(Report)		Stadium: Walkers Stadium; Attendance: 6,141; Referee: L Mason, Bolton

== Record ==
2009–10 was Leicester City's 58th season at the second tier of English football. Their record of winning the division on six occasions (although not since 1980) is second only to Manchester City. Prior to the 2009–10 season, their record at this level was:

Champions	6	1924–25, 1936–37, 1953–54, 1956–57, 1970–71, 1979–80
Automatic promotion	3	1907–08, 1982–83, 2002–03
Promotion play-off winners	2	1994, 1996
Promotion play-off runners-up	2	1992, 1993
Top half	19	
Bottom half	24	
Relegated	1	

== Players ==
=== 2009–10 squad ===
Only includes players given a squad number. The squad listed is the squad which Leicester finished the season with.

Note: Flags indicate national team as defined under FIFA eligibility rules; some limited exceptions apply. Players may hold more than one non-FIFA nationality.

No.	Pos.	Nation	Player
1	GK	ENG	Chris Weale
2	DF	SCO	Robbie Neilson
3	DF	NIR	Ryan McGivern (on loan from Manchester City)
4	DF	ENG	Michael Morrison
5	DF	BUL	Aleksandar Tunchev
6	DF	ENG	Wayne Brown (vice-captain)
7	MF	PER	Nolberto Solano
8	MF	ENG	Matt Oakley (captain)
9	FW	SCO	Steve Howard
10	MF	WAL	Andy King
11	MF	ENG	Lloyd Dyer
12	FW	ENG	Matty Fryatt
13	GK	IRL	Conrad Logan
15	DF	SUI	Bruno Berner
16	MF	WAL	Nicky Adams
17	MF	FRA	Dany N'Guessan

No.	Pos.	Nation	Player
18	FW	ENG	Martyn Waghorn (on loan from Sunderland)
19	MF	ENG	Richie Wellens
20	DF	ENG	Luke O'Neill
21	FW	ENG	Ashley Chambers
22	FW	FRA	Yann Kermorgant
23	FW	ENG	DJ Campbell
24	FW	SCO	Paul Gallagher
25	DF	ENG	Jack Hobbs
26	MF	SWE	Astrit Ajdarević
27	FW	ENG	James Vaughan (on loan from Everton)
29	DF	ENG	Chris Powell
30	DF	ENG	Tom Parkes
31	GK	ENG	Carl Pentney
32	MF	ENG	Aman Verma
33	DF	IRL	Alex Bruce (on loan from Ipswich Town)
34	DF	ENG	Jay Spearing (on loan from Liverpool)

== Transfers ==
=== In ===
Date	Pos.	Nat.	Name	From	Fee
29 June 2009	MF	(France)	Dany N'Guessan	Lincoln City	Undisclosed
1 July 2009	DF	(England)	Jack Hobbs	Liverpool	Undisclosed
1 July 2009	DF	(England)	Wayne Brown	Hull City	Free
1 July 2009	GK	(England)	Chris Weale	Bristol City	Free
1 July 2009	MF	(Sweden)	Astrit Ajdarevic	Liverpool	Free
1 July 2009	DF	(Scotland)	Robbie Neilson	Heart of Midlothian	Free
7 July 2009	MF	(England)	Richie Wellens	Doncaster Rovers	£1,200,000
21 August 2009	FW	(Scotland)	Paul Gallagher	Blackburn Rovers	£900,000
24 August 2009	FW	(France)	Yann Kermorgant	Stade de Reims	Free

=== Out ===
Date	Pos.	Nat.	Name	To	Fee
1 July 2009	MF	(England)	Joe Cobb	Wycombe Wanderers	Free
1 July 2009	DF	(England)	Marc Edworthy	Burton Albion	Free
1 July 2009	MF	(England)	Lee Cox	Inverness Caledonian Thistle	Free
1 July 2009	MF	(Republic of Ireland)	Jonny Hayes	Inverness Caledonian Thistle	Free
1 July 2009	MF	(England)	Ryan Beswick	Kettering Town	Free
13 July 2009	FW	(Jamaica)	Barry Hayles	Cheltenham Town	Free
22 July 2009	FW	(Northern Ireland)	Billy McKay	Northampton Town	Free
10 August 2009	DF	(England)	Joe Mattock	West Bromwich Albion	£1.2 million
25 January 2010	MF	(Ivory Coast)	Max Gradel	Leeds United	Undisclosed
29 January 2010	FW	(Jamaica)	Ricky Sappleton	Macclesfield Town	Free
1 February 2010	FW	(Scotland)	Paul Dickov	Released	Free

=== Loans in ===
Date from	Date to	Pos.	Nat.	Name	From
7 August 2009	End of season	FW	(England)	Martyn Waghorn	Sunderland F.C.
30 August 2009	End of season	DF	(Northern Ireland)	Ryan McGivern	Manchester City
1 February 2010	End of season	DF	(Republic of Ireland)	Alex Bruce	Ipswich Town
10 March 2010	End of season	FW	(England)	James Vaughan	Everton
23 March 2010	End of season	MF	(England)	Jay Spearing	Liverpool

=== Loans out ===
Date from	Date to	Pos.	Nat.	Name	From
1 August 2009	31 December 2009	MF	(England)	Aman Verma	Crewe Alexandra
4 August 2009	End of Season	MF	(Australia)	James Wesolowski	Hamilton Academical
14 August 2009	End of Season	MF	(England)	Harry Worley	Crewe Alexandra
21 August 2009		FW	(England)	Ashley Chambers	Wycombe Wanderers
28 August 2009	1 January 2010	FW	(Scotland)	Paul Dickov	Derby County
11 September 2009		MF	(England)	Levi Porter	Mansfield Town
17 September 2009		FW	(England)	Craig King	Hereford United
11 September 2009	2 January 2010	MF	(Ivory Coast)	Max Gradel	Leeds United
26 November 2009	31 January 2010	FW	(England)	DJ Campbell	Derby County
15 January 2010	14 February 2010	MF	(Wales)	Nicky Adams	Leyton Orient
19 January 2010	18 February 2010	DF	(England)	Luke O'Neill	Tranmere Rovers
21 January 2010	End of season	FW	(England)	Ashley Chambers	Wycombe Wanderers
1 February 2010	End of season	DF	(England)	Lathaniel Rowe-Turner	Torquay United
1 February 2010	End of season	FW	(England)	DJ Campbell	Blackpool
1 February 2010	End of season	MF	(England)	Aman Verma	Histon
25 March 2010	End of season	MF	(Sweden)	Astrit Ajdarevic	Hereford United

== Results ==
=== Football League Championship ===
- Leicester City scores given first

Game	Date	Venue	Opponents	Score	Scorers	Attendance	Points	Position	Report	Notes
1	8 August 2009	Home	Swansea City	2–1	Waghorn 69', N'Guessan 72'	26,171	3	3rd	LCFC.com
2	15 August 2009	Away	Ipswich Town	0–0		22,454	4	6th	LCFC.com
3	18 August 2009	Away	Sheffield United	1–1	Fryatt 52'	26,069	5	8th	LCFC.com
4	22 August 2009	Home	Barnsley	1–0	Fryatt 54'	21,799	8	5th	LCFC.com
5	31 August 2009	Away	Newcastle United	0–1		38,813	8	9th	LCFC.com	Live on Sky Sports
6	12 September 2009	Home	Blackpool	2–1	Fryatt 26', 58'	22,827	11	6th	LCFC.com
7	15 September 2009	Home	Peterborough United	1–1	Fryatt 47 '(pen.)	21,485	12	7th	LCFC.com
8	19 September 2009	Away	Watford	3–3	Fryatt 20' (pen.), 40', N'Guessan 90+1'	14,647	13	9th	LCFC.com
9	26 September 2009	Home	Preston North End	1–2	Berner 90'	20,623	13	10th	LCFC.com
10	29 September 2009	Away	Middlesbrough	1–0	Dyer 83'	18,577	16	8th	LCFC.com
11	4 October 2009	Away	Coventry City	1–1	Waghorn 71'	22,209	17	5th	LCFC.com	M69 Derby
12	17 October 2009	Home	Derby County	0–0		28,875	18	8th	LCFC.com
13	20 October 2009	Home	Crystal Palace	2–0	Gallagher 59', 81'	22,220	21	8th	LCFC.com
14	26 October 2009	Away	Reading	1–0	Waghorn 45'	16,192	24	5th	LCFC.com	Live on Sky Sports
15	30 October 2009	Away	Queens Park Rangers	2–1	Fryatt 37', 64'	17,082	27	2nd	LCFC.com	Live on Sky Sports
16	7 November 2009	Home	West Bromwich Albion	1–2	Berner 90+4'	28,748	27	6th	LCFC.com
17	21 November 2009	Home	Plymouth Argyle	1–0	King 90+4'	27,174	30	3rd	LCFC.com
18	28 November 2009	Away	Scunthorpe United	1–1	Waghorn 3'	6,884	31	3rd	LCFC.com
19	5 December 2009	Away	Nottingham Forest	1–5	Waghorn 64' (pen.)	28,626	31	4th	LCFC.com
20	8 December 2009	Home	Bristol City	1–3	Fryatt 90+3'	19,394	31	7th	LCFC.com
21	12 December 2009	Home	Sheffield Wednesday	3–0	Howard 8', King 25', 73'	22,236	34	4th	LCFC.com
–	19 December 2009	Away	Cardiff City	P–P		–	–	–		Match postponed due to frozen pitch
22	26 December 2009	Home	Sheffield United	2–1	Morrison 23', Fryatt 37'	23,999	37	4th	LCFC.com	Live on Sky Sports
–	28 December 2009	Away	Doncaster Rovers	P–P		–	–	–		Match postponed due to frozen pitch
23	10 January 2010	Home	Ipswich Town	1–1	Howard 38'	20,758	38	5th	LCFC.com	Live on Sky Sports
24	16 January 2010	Away	Swansea City	0–1		15,037	38	7th	LCFC.com
25	26 January 2010	Away	Barnsley	0–1		12,065	38	8th	LCFC.com
26	30 January 2010	Home	Newcastle United	0–0		29,067	39	8th	LCFC.com	Live on Sky Sports
27	6 February 2010	Away	Blackpool	2–1	N'Guessan 15', Dyer 78'	8,484	42	6th	LCFC.com
28	9 February 2010	Home	Doncaster Rovers	0–0		18,928	43	6th	LCFC.com
29	13 February 2010	Home	Scunthorpe United	5–1	Morrison 6', Gallagher 16', 25', 73', Waghorn 34'	21,626	46	6th	LCFC.com
30	16 February 2010	Away	Bristol City	1–1	Dyer 90+2'	13,746	47	6th	LCFC.com
31	20 February 2010	Away	Plymouth Argyle	1–1	o.g. 32'	11,581	48	6th	LCFC.com
32	23 February 2010	Away	Doncaster Rovers	1–0	Waghorn 12'	11,027	51	5th	LCFC.com
33	27 February 2010	Home	Nottingham Forest	3–0	Berner 68', Gallagher 79', King 81'	31,759	54	5th	LCFC.com
34	6 March 2010	Away	Sheffield Wednesday	0–2		21,647	54	5th	LCFC.com
35	13 March 2010	Home	Cardiff City	1–0	Waghorn 29'	22,767	57	5th	LCFC.com
36	16 March 2010	Away	Crystal Palace	1–0	Berner 53'	12,721	60	4th	LCFC.com
37	21 March 2010	Home	Coventry City	2–2	King 4', 19'	23,093	61	4th	LCFC.com	M69 Derby, Live on BBC
38	24 March 2010	Home	Reading	1–2	Waghorn 40'	20,108	61	4th	LCFC.com
39	27 March 2010	Away	Derby County	0–1		30,259	61	6th	LCFC.com
40	30 March 2010	Away	Cardiff City	1–2	Howard 52'	20,438	61	6th	LCFC.com
41	2 April 2010	Away	West Bromwich Albion	0–3		23,334	61	6th	LCFC.com	Live on Sky Sports
42	5 April 2010	Home	Queens Park Rangers	4–0	King 5', Waghorn 45', 50', Howard 78'	22,079	64	6th	LCFC.com
43	10 April 2010	Away	Peterborough United	2–1	Howard 40', King 66'	9,651	67	5th	LCFC.com
44	17 April 2010	Home	Watford	4–1	Waghorn 36' (pen.), Gallagher 41', Spearing 51', Vaughan 67'	24,765	70	5th	LCFC.com
45	24 April 2010	Away	Preston North End	1–0	King 63'	14,926	73	5th	LCFC.com
46	2 May 2010	Home	Middlesbrough	2–0	Kermorgant 41', Wellens 86' (pen.)	30,223	76	5th	LCFC.com

=== Football League Championship play-offs ===
- Leicester City scores given first
- Away goals do not count.

Round	Date	Venue	Opponents	Score	Agg.	Scorers	Attendance	Report	Notes
SF1	9 May 2010	Home	Cardiff City	0–1	0–1		29,165	LCFC.com	Live on Sky Sports
SF2	12 May 2010	Away	Cardiff City	3–2 (a.e.t.)	3–3	Fryatt 25', o.g. 36', King 49'	26,033	LCFC.com	Leicester lost 3–4 on penalties. Live on Sky Sports

=== FA Cup ===
- Leicester City scores given first

Round	Date	Venue	Opponents	Score	Scorers	Attendance	Report	Notes
3	2 January 2010	Home	Swansea City	2–1	King 39', N'Guessan 89'	12,307	LCFC.com
4	23 January 2010	Away	Cardiff City	2–4	Morrison 34', N'Guessan 39'	10,961	LCFC.com

=== League Cup ===
- Leicester City scores given first

Round	Date	Venue	Opponents	Score	Scorers	Attendance	Report	Notes
1	12 August 2009	Away	Macclesfield Town	2–0	N'Guessan 58', Fryatt 71'	2,197	LCFC.com
2	25 August 2009	Away	Preston North End	1–2	Adams 6'	6,977	LCFC.com

== Awards ==
=== Club awards ===
At the end of the season, Leicester's annual award ceremony including categories voted for by the players and backroom staff, the supporters and the supporters club, saw the following players recognised for their achievements for the club throughout the 2009–10 season.

Player of the Season	(England) Jack Hobbs
Young Player of the Season	(England) Martyn Waghorn
Player' Player of the Season	(England) Jack Hobbs and (Wales) Andy King (joint winners)
Supporters' Club Player of the Season	(England) Jack Hobbs
Academy Player of the Season	(Wales) Elliott Chamberlain
Goal of the Season	(Scotland) Paul Gallagher (vs. Nottingham Forest, 27 February 2010)

=== Divisional awards ===
Date	Award	Winner
February 2010	Championship Manager of the Month	(England) Nigel Pearson
February 2010	Championship Player of the Month	(Scotland) Paul Gallagher

== Championship statistics ==
=== Championship table ===
Pos	Team	Pld	W	D	L	GF	GA	GD	Pts	Promotion, qualification or relegation
3	Nottingham Forest	46	22	13	11	65	40	+25	79	Qualification for Championship play-offs
4	Cardiff City	46	22	10	14	73	54	+19	76	Qualification for Championship play-offs
5	Leicester City	46	21	13	12	61	45	+16	76	Qualification for Championship play-offs
6	Blackpool (O, P)	46	19	13	14	74	58	+16	70	Qualification for Championship play-offs
7	Swansea City	46	17	18	11	40	37	+3	69	

Source: The Football League
Rules for classification: 1) points; 2) goal difference; 3) number of goals scored.
(O) Play-off winners; (P) Promoted

=== Club standings ===
Overall								Home						Away					
Pld	W	D	L	GF	GA	GD	Pts	W	D	L	GF	GA	GD	W	D	L	GF	GA	GD
46	21	13	12	61	45	+16	76	13	6	4	40	18	+22	8	7	8	21	27	−6

Last updated: 24 April 2010.
Source: LCFC Championship Results

== Club statistics ==
=== Appearances ===
No.	Nat.	Name	FLC	PO	FAC	LC	Total
1	(England)	Chris Weale	45	2	2	2	51
2	(Scotland)	Robbie Neilson	19	0	2	0	21
3	(Northern Ireland)	Ryan McGivern	9 (3)	0	0	2	11 (3)
4	(England)	Michael Morrison	30 (1)	0	2	2	34 (1)
5	(Bulgaria)	Aleksander Tunchev	1 (1)	0	1	0	2 (1)
6	(England)	Wayne Brown	38 (1)	0	0	1	39 (1)
7	(Ivory Coast)	Max Gradel*	0	0	0 (1)	0	0 (1)
7	(Peru)	Nolberto Solano	6 (5)	2	0	0	8 (5)
8	(England)	Matt Oakley	37 (1)	0	2	2	41 (1)
9	(Scotland)	Steve Howard	17 (18)	1	1	1	20 (18)
10	(Wales)	Andy King	37 (6)	2	1	1	41 (6)
11	(England)	Lloyd Dyer	25 (8)	2	0 (1)	1	28 (9)
12	(England)	Matty Fryatt	26 (3)	1 (1)	2	1 (1)	30 (5)
13	(Republic of Ireland)	Conrad Logan	1 (1)	0	0	0	1 (1)
15	(Switzerland)	Bruno Berner	34 (1)	2	0	0	36 (1)
16	(Wales)	Nicky Adams	1 (17)	0	2	0	3 (17)
17	(France)	Dany N'Guessan	16 (11)	0 (1)	2	1 (1)	19 (13)
18	(England)	Martyn Waghorn	27 (15)	1 (1)	1	0 (1)	29 (17)
19	(England)	Richie Wellens	41	2	2	1	46
20	(England)	Luke O'Neill	0 (1)	0	1	0	1 (1)
22	(France)	Yann Kermorgant	9 (11)	0 (2)	1 (1)	0 (1)	10 (15)
23	(England)	DJ Campbell	0 (3)	0	0	0	0 (3)
24	(Scotland)	Paul Gallagher	31 (10)	2	0 (1)	2	35 (11)
25	(England)	Jack Hobbs	44	2	1	2	49
27	(Scotland)	Paul Dickov*	0 (1)	0	0 (1)	0	0 (2)
27	(England)	James Vaughan	2 (6)	0	0	0	2 (6)
29	(England)	Chris Powell	2	0	0	0	2
33	(Republic of Ireland)	Alex Bruce	2 (1)	2	0	0	4 (1)
34	(England)	Jay Spearing	6 (1)	1 (1)	0	0	7 (2)

Note:

- Substitute appearances given in brackets.
- Asterisk indicates player left the club mid-season.

=== Top scorers ===
Pos.	Nat.	Player	FLC	PO	FAC	LC	Total
1	(England)	Matty Fryatt	11	1	0	1	13
2	(England)	Martyn Waghorn	12	0	0	0	12
3	(Wales)	Andy King	9	1	1	0	11
4	(Scotland)	Paul Gallagher	7	0	0	0	7
5	(France)	Dany N'Guessan	3	0	2	1	6
6	(Scotland)	Steve Howard	5	0	0	0	5
7	(Switzerland)	Bruno Berner	4	0	0	0	4
8	(England)	Michael Morrison	2	0	1	0	3
=	(England)	Lloyd Dyer	3	0	0	0	3
10	(Wales)	Nicky Adams	0	0	0	1	1
=	(England)	Jay Spearing	1	0	0	0	1
=	(England)	James Vaughan	1	0	0	0	1
=	(England)	Richie Wellens	1	0	0	0	1
=	(France)	Yann Kermorgant	1	0	0	0	1

=== Disciplinary record ===
Nat.	Player	Booked	Sent off (straight red)
(England)	Richie Wellens	8	1
(England)	Martyn Waghorn	6	1
(Scotland)	Steve Howard	6	1
(England)	Matt Oakley	7	0
(Switzerland)	Bruno Berner	7	0
(England)	Matt Oakley	7	0
(England)	Wayne Brown	5	0
(Northern Ireland)	Ryan McGivern	4	0
(Scotland)	Paul Gallagher	4	0
(England)	Michael Morrison	3	0
(Scotland)	Robbie Neilson	3	0
(England)	Lloyd Dyer	3	0
(France)	Dany N'Guessan	2	0
(England)	Jack Hobbs	2	0
(Wales)	Andy King	2	0
(Peru)	Nolberto Solano	2	0
(England)	Matty Fryatt	1	0
(England)	James Vaughan	1	0
(Republic of Ireland)	Alex Bruce	1	0

All Stats obtained from LCFC.com
