= Aman Verma =

Aman Verma may refer to:

- Aman Verma (actor) (born 1961), Indian television anchor and actor
- Aman Verma (footballer) (born 1987), English footballer
- Aman Verma, fictional character portrayed by Akshay Kumar in the 1999 Indian film Sangharsh
