= 2014–15 AE Larissa F.C. season =

AEL
2014–15 season
- Owner: Little Acre Farm S.A.
- Chairman: Sotiris Plexidas
- Manager: Soulis Papadopoulos
- Stadium: Alcazar Stadium
- Football League: 3rd
- Greek Cup: First Round
- Top goalscorer: League: Milan Bojović (5); Thanasis Pindonis (5); All: Milan Bojović (7)
| Home colours | Away colours |

The 2014–15 season is AE Larissa F.C. Football Club's 51st year in existence as a football club.

== Players ==
=== Squad statistics ===
Updated as of 17 May 2015, 00:08 UTC. (After AEL - AEK)

| No. | Pos. | Name | Age | League | | | Cup | | | Play-Offs | | | Total | | | Discipline | |
| No. | Pos. | Name | Age | Apps | Goals | Start | Apps | Goals | Start | Apps | Goals | Start | Apps | Goals | Start | Yellow card | Red card |
Goalkeepers
| 15 | GK | (Greece) Tasos Papagiannis | 21 | 0 | 0 | 0 | 0 | 0 | 0 | 0 | 0 | 0 | 0 | 0 | 0 | 0 | 0 |
| 30 | GK | (Greece) Manolis Apostolidis | 31 | 24 | 0 | 24 | 2 | 0 | 2 | 3 | 0 | 3 | 29 | 0 | 29 | 3 | 1 |
| 62 | GK | (Greece) Dimitris Patsiogeorgos | 21 | 0 | 0 | 0 | 0 | 0 | 0 | 2 | 0 | 1 | 2 | 0 | 1 | 1 | 0 |
| 71 | GK | (Greece) Vangelis Balasakis | 21 | 0 | 0 | 0 | 0 | 0 | 0 | 0 | 0 | 0 | 0 | 0 | 0 | 0 | 0 |
Defenders
| 2 | DF | (Greece) Thanasis Moulopoulos | 29 | 14 | 0 | 14 | 2 | 0 | 2 | 0 | 0 | 0 | 16 | 0 | 16 | 2 | 0 |
| 3 | DF | (Greece) Kostas Kourtesiotis | 30 | 7 | 0 | 6 | 0 | 0 | 0 | 0 | 0 | 0 | 7 | 0 | 6 | 3 | 0 |
| 4 | DF | (Greece) Stavros Stathakis | 27 | 0 | 0 | 0 | 0 | 0 | 0 | 0 | 0 | 0 | 0 | 0 | 0 | 0 | 0 |
| 5 | DF | (Greece) Paschalis Melissas | 33 | 13 | 0 | 11 | 2 | 0 | 2 | 3 | 0 | 3 | 18 | 0 | 16 | 5 | 0 |
| 20 | DF | (Greece) Nikos Karanikas | 23 | 16 | 1 | 11 | 1 | 0 | 0 | 3 | 0 | 3 | 20 | 1 | 14 | 5 | 0 |
| 21 | DF | (Greece) Dimitris Kontodimos | 33 | 17 | 0 | 17 | 2 | 0 | 2 | 4 | 0 | 4 | 23 | 0 | 23 | 2 | 0 |
| 11 | DF | (Greece) Manos Zacharakis | 22 | 2 | 0 | 1 | 0 | 0 | 0 | 0 | 0 | 0 | 2 | 0 | 1 | 0 | 0 |
| 33 | DF | (Greece) Achilleas Sarakatsanos | 32 | 23 | 0 | 23 | 2 | 0 | 2 | 4 | 0 | 3 | 29 | 0 | 28 | 5 | 0 |
| 40 | DF | (Greece) Giorgos Delizisis | 27 | 23 | 2 | 23 | 0 | 0 | 0 | 3 | 0 | 3 | 26 | 2 | 26 | 4 | 0 |
Midfielders
| 6 | MF | (Greece) Kostas Nebegleras (c) | 40 | 19 | 2 | 18 | 2 | 0 | 2 | 4 | 1 | 4 | 25 | 3 | 24 | 9 | 0 |
| 7 | MF | (Greece) Giorgos Lyras | 20 | 1 | 0 | 0 | 0 | 0 | 0 | 0 | 0 | 0 | 1 | 0 | 0 | 0 | 0 |
| 8 | MF | (Serbia) Risto Ristović | 27 | 6 | 0 | 0 | 0 | 0 | 0 | 1 | 0 | 0 | 7 | 0 | 0 | 3 | 0 |
| 13 | MF | (Greece) Thanasis Pindonis | 29 | 20 | 5 | 17 | 2 | 0 | 1 | 4 | 0 | 2 | 26 | 5 | 20 | 7 | 1 |
| 18 | MF | (Brazil) Eliomar | 27 | 13 | 2 | 11 | 0 | 0 | 0 | 3 | 0 | 2 | 16 | 2 | 13 | 7 | 0 |
| 19 | MF | (France) David Fleurival | 31 | 4 | 0 | 2 | 0 | 0 | 0 | 0 | 0 | 0 | 4 | 0 | 2 | 1 | 0 |
| 22 | MF | (Greece) Kostas Banousis | 27 | 7 | 1 | 5 | 0 | 0 | 0 | 4 | 0 | 4 | 11 | 1 | 9 | 5 | 0 |
| 97 | MF | (Portugal) Sérginho | 29 | 9 | 0 | 8 | 0 | 0 | 0 | 4 | 0 | 4 | 13 | 0 | 12 | 1 | 0 |
Forwards
| 9 | FW | (France) (Ivory Coast) Dany N'Guessan | 27 | 5 | 1 | 2 | 0 | 0 | 0 | 4 | 0 | 2 | 9 | 1 | 4 | 2 | 0 |
| 12 | FW | (Greece) Giorgos Pamlidis | 21 | 3 | 0 | 0 | 0 | 0 | 0 | 0 | 0 | 0 | 3 | 0 | 0 | 1 | 0 |
| 27 | FW | (Greece) Dimitris Giantsis | 27 | 11 | 1 | 7 | 0 | 0 | 0 | 3 | 1 | 0 | 14 | 2 | 7 | 3 | 0 |
| 44 | FW | (Brazil) Pinto | 23 | 9 | 1 | 6 | 0 | 0 | 0 | 4 | 0 | 3 | 13 | 1 | 9 | 2 | 0 |
| 88 | FW | (Serbia) Milan Bojović | 28 | 14 | 5 | 12 | 0 | 0 | 0 | 3 | 2 | 3 | 17 | 7 | 15 | 5 | 0 |

==== Promotion Play Offs ====
| 26 April 2015 1 | Panachaiki | 2 - 3 | AEL | Patra |
| 18:00 UTC+2 | Kyvelidis 43' (pen.); Kontochristos 59' | Report | Bojović 50'; Nebegleras 63'; Giantsis 87' | Stadium: Pampeloponnisiako Stadium; Attendance: 2.500; Referee: Ioannis Delfakis |

| 4 May 2015 2 | AEL | 0 - 1 | Apollon Smyrnis | Larissa |
| 18:00 UTC+2 | | Report | Bambam 49' | Stadium: Alkazar Stadium; Attendance: Behind Closed Doors; Referee: Anastasios Sidiropoulos |

| 9 May 2015 3 | Olympiacos Volos | 0 - 1 | AEL | Volos |
| 19:00 UTC+2 | | Report | Bojović 50' | Stadium: Volos Municipal Stadium; Attendance: 707; Referee: Georgios Liaxoudis |

| 13 May 2015 4 | AEL | 0 - 1 | AEK Athens | Larissa |
| 18:00 UTC+2 | | Report | Platellas 42' | Stadium: Alcazar Stadium; Attendance: 5.000; Referee: Aristomenis Koutsiaftis |

| 20 May 2015 5 | Iraklis | v | AEL | Thessaloniki |
| 18:00 UTC+2 | | | | Stadium: Kaftanzoglio Stadium |

| 24 May 2015 6 | AEL | v | Panachaiki | Larissa |
| 18:00 UTC+2 | | | | Stadium: Alcazar Stadium |

| 31 May 2014 7 | Apollon Smyrnis | v | AEL | Rizoupoli |
| 18:00 UTC+2 | | | | Stadium: Georgios Kamaras Stadium |

| 3 June 2015 8 | AEL | v | Olympiacos Volos | Larissa |
| 18:00 UTC+2 | | | | Stadium: Alcazar Stadium |

| 7 June 2015 9 | AEK Athens | v | AEL | Amarousion |
| 18:00 UTC+2 | | | | Stadium: Athens Olympic Stadium |

| 14 June 2015 10 | AEL | v | Iraklis | Larissa |
| 18:00 UTC+2 | | | | Stadium: Alcazar Stadium |
