= Ben Nunn =

English footballer

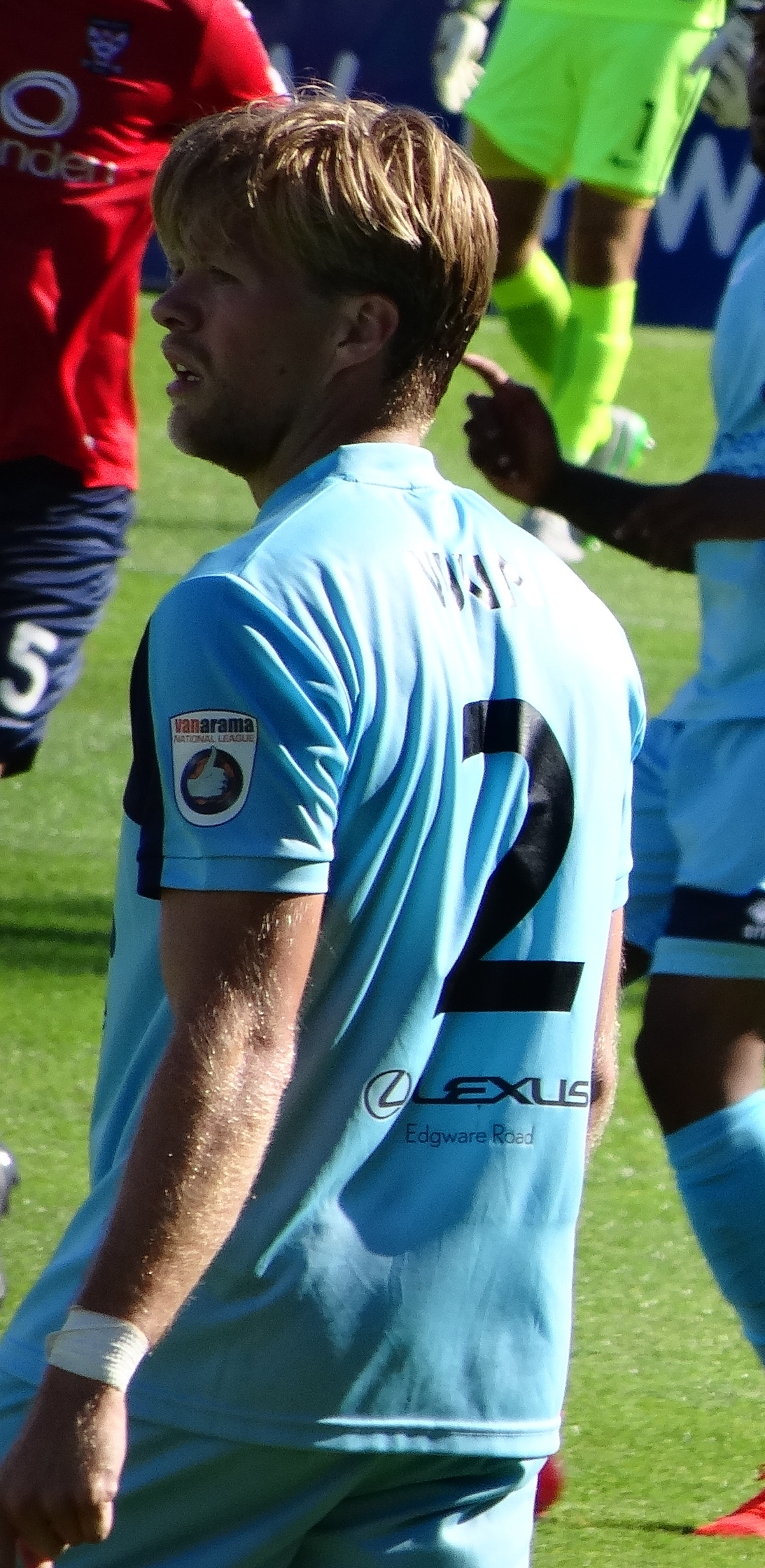
- Nunn playing for Boreham Wood in 2016

Personal information
- Full name: Benjamin Nunn
- Date of birth: 25 October 1989 (age 37)
- Place of birth: Cambridge, England
- Height: 1.73 m (5 ft 8 in)
- Position: Right back

Team information
- Current team: Ware

Youth career
- –2006: Boston United

Senior career*
Years	Team	Apps	(Gls)
2006–2007	Boston United	1	(0)
2007–2008	Rushden & Diamonds	1	(0)
2008–2009	Cambridge City	30	(0)
2009–2010	Bishop's Stortford	26	(0)
2010–2012	Chelmsford City	67	(1)
2012–2017	Boreham Wood	151	(3)
2015	→ St Albans City (loan)	7	(0)
2017–2019	Dagenham & Redbridge	46	(1)
2019–2020	Billericay Town	21	(0)
2021–	Ware		
- * Club domestic league appearances and goals as of 11:59, 5 January 2022 (UTC)

Benjamin Nunn (born 25 October 1989) is an English footballer who plays as a right-back for Ware.

== Career ==
=== Early career ===
Nunn started his career at Boston United and made his first team debut on 14 April 2007 at the age of seventeen whilst still a first year scholar, replacing Jamie Stevens as a late substitute in the 3–0 away defeat to Hereford United. Boston were in severe financial difficulty at the time and were deducted ten points and relegated from League Two to the Conference Premier at the end of the 2006–07 season. In June 2007, following the Football Conference AGM, it was decided that Boston should be demoted to the Conference North and Nunn subsequently left the club.

He started the second year of his scholarship with Conference Premier side Rushden & Diamonds and played three games in the Hillier Cup before making his only first team appearance in April 2008, replacing Chris Hope as a substitute in the 3–0 defeat to Grays Athletic. However, it wasn't enough to earn a professional contract and he was released at the end of his scholarship in the summer 2008.

After a successful trial, Nunn joined Southern League Premier Division side Cambridge City in August 2008. He was a first team regular throughout the season making thirty league appearances as the side finished in 4th position and eventually lost out to Gloucester City in the play-off semi final. The side also won the Cambridgeshire Invitation Cup beating Cambridge Regional College in the final 1–0.

After a year at Cambridge City, Nunn moved up a division to sign for Conference South side Bishop's Stortford for the 2009–10 season. He was a first team regular throughout the majority of the season making twenty-six league appearances as Stortford struggled near the bottom of the table. However, he helped the club reach the final of the Hertfordshire Senior Cup, featuring in the 8–2 semi-final win over Stevenage Borough Reserves before he left the club in March 2010.

=== Chelmsford City ===
Later that month he joined divisional rivals Chelmsford City who were aiming for promotion via the play-offs. He featured in five of the last six league games as the club finished in 3rd position, but were later beaten 3–0 on aggregate by Bath City in the play-off semi-final. Nunn left the club in May 2012, as the club failed to pay the players wages from March 2012.

=== Boreham Wood ===
In July 2012, Nunn joined Conference South side Boreham Wood after impressing in a pre-season trial match against Watford. In September 2014, he took a five-month break away from football to go travelling across Asia, Australia and New Zealand. He returned to action on 28 February 2015 in the 2–1 defeat to Havant & Waterlooville, but was sent off for a late challenge shortly after being substituted on. He only missed one more match in the run-in to the end of the season and Boreham Wood were eventually promoted to the National League after defeating Whitehawk in the play-off final.

In October 2015, after losing his place in the side, he was sent out on loan to National League South side St Albans City for some more regular game time.

=== Dagenham & Redbridge ===
On 31 May 2017, he signed a two-year contract for National League side Dagenham & Redbridge on a free transfer, making him the first signing of their summer transfer window. In May 2019, it was announced that he would be released following the expiration of his contract at the end of the 2018–19 campaign.

=== Billericay Town ===
In June 2019, Nunn joined Billericay Town.

=== Ware ===
On 15 July 2021 he signed for Southern Football League Division One Central newcomers Ware, having not played since before the COVID-19 pandemic.

== Personal life ==
Outside of football, Nunn has set up a property business called FN Property Group and also owns a male grooming company called Benny's of London which he started in 2015 with his partner Samantha.

== Career statistics ==
As of match played 14 March 2020

Appearances and goals by club, season and competition
Club	Season	League			FA Cup		League Cup		Other		Total	
Club	Season	Division	Apps	Goals	Apps	Goals	Apps	Goals	Apps	Goals	Apps	Goals
Boston United	2006–07	League Two	1	0	0	0	0	0	0	0	1	0
Rushden & Diamonds	2007–08	Conference Premier	1	0	0	0	—		0	0	1	0
Cambridge City	2008–09	SL Premier Division	30	0	3	0	—		4 (Note: Appearances in FA Trophy)	0	37	0
Bishop's Stortford	2009–10	Conference South	26	0	1	0	—		2	0	29	0
Chelmsford City	2009–10	Conference South	5	0	—		—		1 (Note: Appearances in Conference South play-offs)	0	6	0
Chelmsford City	2010–11	Conference South	34	1	4	0	—		3 (Note: Two appearances in Conference South play-offs, one in FA Trophy)	0	41	1
Chelmsford City	2011–12	Conference South	28	0	2	0	—		1	0	31	0
Chelmsford City	Total		67	1	6	0	—		5	0	78	1
Boreham Wood	2012–13	Conference South	34	2	3	1	—		3	0	40	3
Boreham Wood	2013–14	Conference South	37	0	5	0	—		1	0	43	0
Boreham Wood	2014–15	Conference South	18	1	0	0	—		3	0	21	1
Boreham Wood	2015–16	National League	26	0	—		—		—		26	0
Boreham Wood	2016–17	National League	36	0	3	0	—		1	0	40	0
Boreham Wood	Total		151	3	11	1	—		8	0	170	4
St Albans City (loan)	2015–16	National League South	7	0	2	0	—		1	0	11	0
Dagenham & Redbridge	2017–18	National League	25	0	0	0	—		0	0	25	0
Dagenham & Redbridge	2018–19	National League	21	1	1	0	—		0	0	22	1
Dagenham & Redbridge	Total		46	1	1	0	—		0	0	47	1
Billericay Town	2019–20	National League South	21	0	5	0	—		0	0	26	0
Career totals			350	5	29	1	0	0	20	0	399	6

== Honours ==
Cambridge City

- Cambridgeshire Invitation Cup: 2008–09

Boreham Wood

- Conference South play-offs: 2014–15
