= Dany N'Guessan =

French footballer (born 1987)

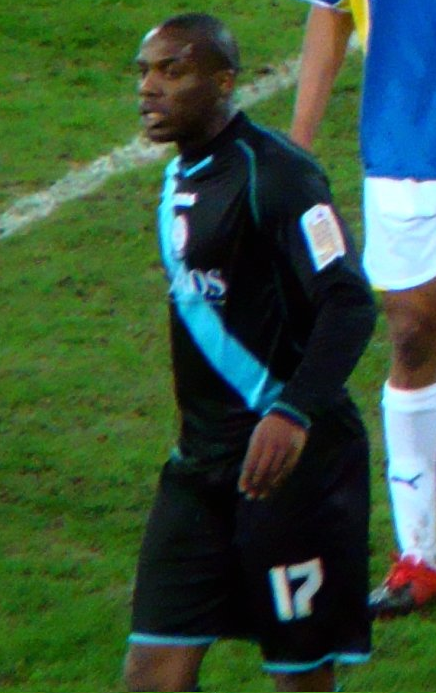
- N'Guessan in Leicester City colours in 2010

Personal information
- Full name: Djombo Dany-Gael N'Guessan
- Date of birth: 11 August 1987 (age 39)
- Place of birth: Ivry-sur-Seine, France
- Height: 1.85 m (6 ft 1 in)
- Positions: Left winger; forward

Youth career
- Auxerre

Senior career*
| Years | Team | Apps | (Gls) |
| 2003–2005 | Auxerre | 0 | (0) |
| 2005–2007 | Rangers | 0 | (0) |
| 2006–2007 | → Boston United (loan) | 23 | (5) |
| 2007–2009 | Lincoln City | 91 | (16) |
| 2009–2011 | Leicester City | 32 | (3) |
| 2010 | → Scunthorpe United (loan) | 3 | (1) |
| 2011 | → Southampton (loan) | 6 | (0) |
| 2011 | → Millwall (loan) | 1 | (0) |
| 2011–2013 | Millwall | 28 | (2) |
| 2012 | → Charlton Athletic (loan) | 7 | (4) |
| 2013–2014 | Swindon Town | 24 | (8) |
| 2014–2015 | Port Vale | 11 | (2) |
| 2015 | AEL | 10 | (1) |
| 2015–2016 | Doncaster Rovers | 8 | (0) |
| 2017 | IK Start | 4 | (2) |
| Total | | 246 | (43) |
- * Club domestic league appearances and goals

Djombo Dany-Gael N'Guessan (born 11 August 1987) is a French former professional footballer who played as a left winger or forward. He scored 53 goals in 286 league and cup appearances during a 14-year career.

A graduate of the Auxerre Academy, he left France for Scotland when he signed with Rangers in July 2005. He never made a first-team appearance for either club and instead made his senior debut in the English Football League on loan at Boston United. He joined Lincoln City in January 2007 and spent over two seasons with the Imps. He was named League Two Player of the Month in January 2009 and was listed on the PFA Team of the Year for 2008–09. He moved on to Leicester City in June 2009. However, he fell out of first-team contention at the club and instead spent time on loan at Scunthorpe United, Southampton and Millwall. He joined Millwall on a free transfer in August 2011, though again never established himself as a first-team regular, and instead, he joined Charlton Athletic on loan. He spent the 2013–14 campaign with Swindon Town. He signed with Port Vale in October 2014 and then moved to the Greek side AEL three months later. He returned to England with Doncaster Rovers in July 2015 before joining the Norwegian side IK Start for a brief spell in April 2017.

== Career ==
=== Auxerre to Rangers ===
N'Guessan was born in France with Ivorian heritage. He began his career at Auxerre, spending "several years" at the club at youth level without making a first-team debut.

He signed a two-year contract with Scottish Premier League side Rangers in July 2005. Manager Alex McLeish stated that he would not rush the player into the first-team squad. He spent the first half of the 2006–07 season on loan at English League Two club Boston United. He made his first-team debut on 19 August, playing 87 minutes of a 5–0 defeat to Shrewsbury Town at Gay Meadow. He scored his first goal in senior football on 1 September, converting a late consolation goal from close range in a 2–1 defeat to Hartlepool United. In total he scored five goals in 26 appearances for Steve Evans's Pilgrims, who were relegated out of the Football League at the end of the 2006–07 season. Despite making a few appearances on the bench, N'Guessan never made a first-team appearance for Rangers.

=== Lincoln City ===
N'Guessan signed a two-and-a-half-year contract with Lincoln City after joining the club on a free transfer in January 2007. He made nine appearances for John Schofield's Imps in the second half of the 2006–07 campaign.

He scored his first goal for Lincoln on 18 August 2007, scoring the second goal of a 3–1 win over Mansfield Town at Field Mill. He suffered a poor run of form towards the end of the 2007–08 season, during which time teammate Nat Brown publicly defended him, saying "careful what you say about him, sometimes he can take it to heart... I don't think people recognise how much work he does for the team." Two weeks after Brown defended him, he scored both goals in a 2–1 victory over Hereford United, running the entire length of the pitch to score his first goal. He ended the 2007–08 season with eight goals in 41 games.

He was named League Two Player of the Month after scoring four goals in January 2009. Milton Keynes Dons made two bids for the player during that month, but both bids were rejected. He stated he was happy at Sincil Bank, but despite this, he refused to sign a new contract with Lincoln. He was named in the League Two PFA Team of the Year for the 2008–09 season, and manager Peter Jackson said that "his form's been excellent, he's been a lot more consistent and he deserves the award."

=== Leicester City ===
N'Guessan signed a three-year contract with Nigel Pearson's Leicester City in June 2009, after he rejected approaches from Sheffield Wednesday and Ipswich Town. Although Lincoln were entitled to compensation (due to N'Guessan being 21), a compensation fee was not settled between the two clubs until late July. He made his competitive debut for the Foxes on 8 August, coming on as a half-time substitute for Andy King against Swansea City, scoring the winning goal as Leicester won 2–1. He scored his second goal after making his full debut for the club just four days later in a 2–0 League Cup win over Macclesfield Town. On 6 February, he helped Leicester to their first away victory over Blackpool in 73 years by scoring in a 2–1 win. He scored six goals in 32 appearances throughout the 2009–10 season, helping City to quality for the Championship play-offs with a fifth-place finish.

He lost his first-team place at the King Power Stadium early in the 2010–11 season under new boss Paulo Sousa. He failed to regain his place under Sousa or his successor Sven-Göran Eriksson. On 12 November, he joined Scunthorpe United on a one-month loan. He scored on his Irons debut at Glanford Park on 13 November, netting a header in a 4–2 defeat to Cardiff City. Despite this good start he was only given three games by manager Alan Knill. On 26 January 2011, he signed a six-month loan deal with Southampton, as Saints manager Nigel Adkins had Adam Lallana out injured and Jason Puncheon struggling for form. He provided one assist for Rickie Lambert but made only two starts at St Mary's Stadium, as the club secured promotion out of League One at the end of the 2010–11 season.

=== Millwall ===
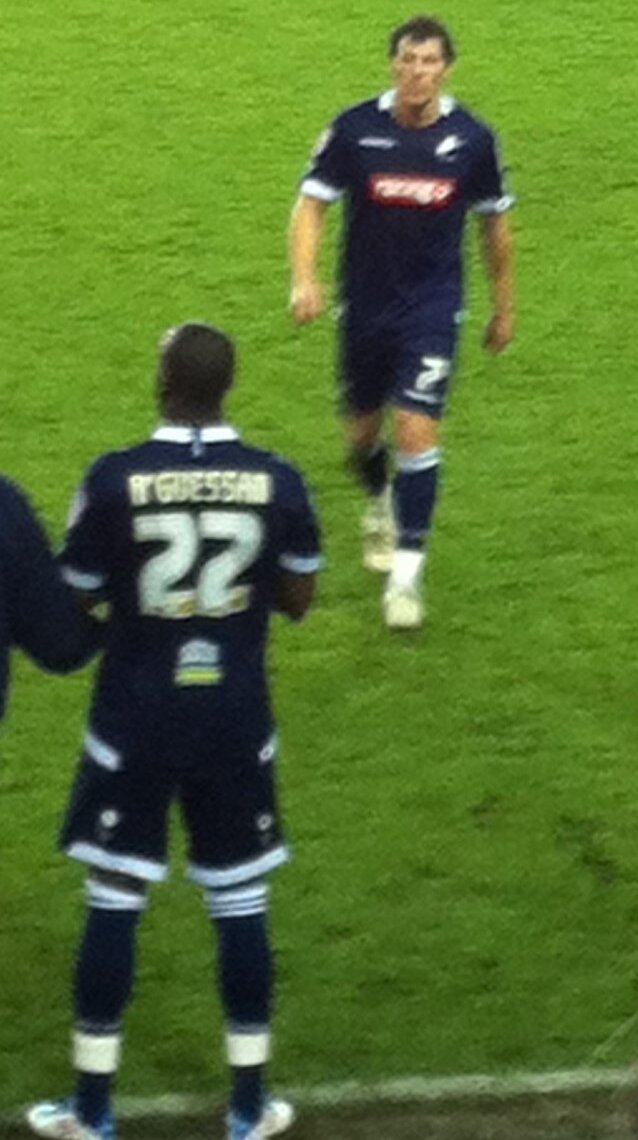
N'Guessan (bottom) about to come on as a substitute for Millwall

On 8 August 2011, N'Guessan joined Millwall on a six-month loan. The following day he scored on his Lions debut, in a 1–0 win over Plymouth Argyle in the League Cup. At the end of the month he joined the club on a three-year deal after Millwall paid Leicester City an undisclosed fee. On 19 March 2012, he joined Charlton Athletic on loan until the end of the season. The next day he scored seven minutes into his debut in a 3–0 victory over Yeovil Town at The Valley. At the end of the season, manager Chris Powell led Charlton to promotion into the Championship as League One champions.

He scored two goals in 18 games during the 2012–13 season, including five appearances during the club's run to the FA Cup semi-finals. He made his last appearance at The Den on 30 April, when he was substituted off the field after only 14 minutes after entering the match as a substitute himself; manager Kenny Jackett explained that he "didn't think Dany was particularly playing for the team".

=== Swindon Town ===
N'Guessan joined Swindon Town in September 2013, following his release from Millwall. He enjoyed a good start to the 2013–14 season, but after he began struggling for form Robins manager Mark Cooper made him available on a free transfer in January 2014. He faced strong competition from Nicky Ajose, Michael Smith and Nile Ranger. He was not offered a new contract at the County Ground at the end of the 2013–14 season despite finishing as the club's joint-top scorer with eight goals.

=== Port Vale ===
N'Guessan signed a two-month contract with League One side Port Vale in October 2014. He scored his first two goals for the Valiants on 8 November in a 4–3 FA Cup first round defeat to Milton Keynes Dons at Vale Park. Despite the brace both he and manager Rob Page stated that he was only 70% fit. He continued to impress for the "Valiants" and was handed a contract until the end of the 2014–15 season. He marked the occasion with a goal and an assist in a 2–1 victory over Sheffield United, for which he was named on the Football League team of the week. He had his contract terminated by mutual consent in January 2015, as chairman Norman Smurthwaite stated that he had agreed to release N'Guessan if the player received a better contract offer from elsewhere.

=== AEL ===
N'Guessan joined AEL in the Greek Football League in January 2015. He scored one goal in ten appearances during the second half of the 2014–15 season.

=== Doncaster Rovers ===
He returned to England in July 2015 when he signed a two-year contract with Paul Dickov's Doncaster Rovers. He was transfer listed by new manager Darren Ferguson after featuring just nine times in the 2015–16 relegation season. He refused to go out on loan into the National League and reached an agreement to leave the club in October 2016.

=== IK Start ===
On 28 April 2017, he signed a one-year contract with Norwegian First Division side IK Start. He scored on his debut in a 3–2 defeat to Bodø/Glimt at the Aspmyra Stadion on 2 May. He picked up an injury which left him sidelined for six weeks, and he had his contract terminated in July 2017 after scoring two goals from four games in 2017.

== Style of play ==
N'Guessan is an attacking player with good technical ability. In May 2009, his former manager Steve Evans said that he had "pace, power, he can use both feet and he has incredible balance" and stated he could play in the Premier League. However, he has been criticised for his lack of consistency. Port Vale boss Rob Page stated that N'Guessan was not a target man despite his size, and instead used intelligent runs and technical ability to beat defenders.

== Personal life ==
N'Guessan's son Djylian is also a professional footballer.

== Career statistics ==
Appearances and goals by club, season and competition
| Club | Season | League | | | National cup (Note: Includes Coupe de France, Scottish Cup, FA Cup, Greek Cup, Norwegian Cup) | | League cup (Note: Includes Coupe de la Ligue, Scottish League Cup, Football League Cup) | | Other | | Total | |
| Club | Season | Division | Apps | Goals | Apps | Goals | Apps | Goals | Apps | Goals | Apps | Goals |
|---|---|---|---|---|---|---|---|---|---|---|---|---|
| Auxerre | 2003–04 | Ligue 1 | 0 | 0 | 0 | 0 | 0 | 0 | 0 | 0 | 0 | 0 |
| Auxerre | 2004–05 | Ligue 1 | 0 | 0 | 0 | 0 | 0 | 0 | 0 | 0 | 0 | 0 |
| Auxerre | Total | | 0 | 0 | 0 | 0 | 0 | 0 | 0 | 0 | 0 | 0 |
| Rangers | 2005–06 | SPL | 0 | 0 | 0 | 0 | 0 | 0 | 0 | 0 | 0 | 0 |
| Rangers | 2006–07 | SPL | 0 | 0 | 0 | 0 | 0 | 0 | 0 | 0 | 0 | 0 |
| Rangers | Total | | 0 | 0 | 0 | 0 | 0 | 0 | 0 | 0 | 0 | 0 |
| Boston United (loan) | 2006–07 | League Two | 23 | 5 | 1 | 0 | 1 | 0 | 1 (Note: Appearance(s) in the EFL Trophy.) | 0 | 26 | 5 |
| Lincoln City | 2006–07 | League Two | 9 | 0 | 0 | 0 | 0 | 0 | 0 | 0 | 9 | 0 |
| Lincoln City | 2007–08 | League Two | 45 | 8 | 2 | 0 | 1 | 0 | 1 | 0 | 49 | 8 |
| Lincoln City | 2008–09 | League Two | 37 | 8 | 2 | 1 | 1 | 0 | 1 | 0 | 41 | 9 |
| Lincoln City | Total | | 91 | 16 | 4 | 1 | 2 | 0 | 2 | 0 | 99 | 17 |
| Leicester City | 2009–10 | Championship | 27 | 3 | 2 | 2 | 2 | 1 | 1 (Note: Appearance(s) in the play-offs.) | 0 | 32 | 6 |
| Leicester City | 2010–11 | Championship | 5 | 0 | 0 | 0 | 3 | 0 | — | | 8 | 0 |
| Leicester City | 2011–12 | Championship | 0 | 0 | 0 | 0 | 0 | 0 | — | | 0 | 0 |
| Leicester City | Total | | 32 | 3 | 2 | 2 | 5 | 1 | 1 | 0 | 40 | 6 |
| Scunthorpe United (loan) | 2010–11 | Championship | 3 | 1 | 0 | 0 | — | | — | | 3 | 1 |
| Southampton (loan) | 2010–11 | League One | 6 | 0 | 1 | 0 | — | | — | | 7 | 0 |
| Millwall | 2011–12 | Championship | 15 | 1 | 2 | 1 | 2 | 1 | — | | 19 | 3 |
| Millwall | 2012–13 | Championship | 13 | 1 | 5 | 1 | 0 | 0 | — | | 18 | 2 |
| Millwall | 2013–14 | Championship | 1 | 0 | 0 | 0 | 0 | 0 | — | | 1 | 0 |
| Millwall | Total | | 29 | 2 | 7 | 2 | 2 | 1 | 0 | 0 | 38 | 5 |
| Charlton Athletic (loan) | 2011–12 | League One | 7 | 4 | — | | — | | — | | 7 | 4 |
| Swindon Town | 2013–14 | League One | 24 | 8 | 1 | 0 | 1 | 0 | 5 | 0 | 31 | 8 |
| Port Vale | 2014–15 | League One | 11 | 2 | 1 | 2 | 0 | 0 | 0 | 0 | 12 | 4 |
| AEL | 2014–15 | Football League Greece | 10 | 1 | 0 | 0 | — | | 0 | 0 | 10 | 1 |
| Doncaster Rovers | 2015–16 | League One | 8 | 0 | 0 | 0 | 0 | 0 | 1 | 0 | 9 | 0 |
| Doncaster Rovers | 2016–17 | EFL League Two | 0 | 0 | 0 | 0 | 0 | 0 | 0 | 0 | 0 | 0 |
| Doncaster Rovers | Total | | 8 | 0 | 0 | 0 | 0 | 0 | 1 | 0 | 9 | 0 |
| IK Start | 2017 | Norwegian First Division | 4 | 2 | 0 | 0 | — | | 0 | 0 | 4 | 2 |
| Career total | | | 248 | 44 | 17 | 7 | 11 | 2 | 10 | 0 | 286 | 53 |

== Honours ==
Southampton

- League One second-place promotion: 2010–11

Charlton Athletic

- League One: 2011–12

Individual

- League Two Player of the Month: January 2009
- League Two PFA Team of the Year: 2008–09
