= Joe Cobb (footballer) =

English footballer

Personal information
- Full name: Joe Anthony Cobb
- Date of birth: 13 October 1990 (age 36)
- Place of birth: Leicester, England
- Position: Defender

Team information
- Current team: Shepshed Dynamo

Youth career
- 2005–2009: Leicester City

Senior career*
Years	Team	Apps	(Gls)
2009–2010	Wycombe Wanderers	0	(0)
2010–2011	Jerez Industrial CF	0	(0)
2011–??	Hinckley United	2	(0)
2012	Oadby Town	23	(2)
2014	Shepshed Dynamo		
- * Club domestic league appearances and goals as of 00:58, 25 September 2010 (UTC)

Joe Anthony Cobb (born 13 October 1990) is an English professional footballer who plays as a defender for Shepshed Dynamo in the Midland Football League.

== Career ==
Left-back Cobb signed a one-year deal with Wycombe Wanderers on 30 June 2009, following his release from Leicester City. He made his debut for Wycombe in the Football League Trophy against Northampton Town on 1 September, replacing Craig Woodman as a substitute in the 46th minute. Cobb was released from Wycombe at the end of the 2009–10 season making one club appearance against Leeds United.

At the start of the 2010–11 season, Cobb signed for the Spanish club Jerez CF.
