= Daniel Cotton =

English footballer

Personal information
- Date of birth: 8 April 1988 (age 38)
- Place of birth: Peterborough, England
- Height: 5 ft 9 in (1.75 m)
- Positions: Midfielder; striker

Team information
- Current team: March Town FC

Senior career*
Years	Team	Apps	(Gls)
2004-2006	Blackstones	43	(21)
2006–2007 & 2009	Boston United	3 & 16	(1)
2007–2010	Stamford		(50)
2010-2012	Soham Town Rangers	46	(20)
2012-2014	Spalding United	77	(52)
2014-2022	Yaxley FC	335	(215)
2022-2024	Cambridge City	62	(24)
2024-2026	March Town F.C.	90	(24)
- * Club domestic league appearances and goals as of 1st June 2026

Daniel Cotton (born 8 April 1988) in Peterborough, England is a former professional footballer at Boston United, who played as a midfielder/forward across the English Football Pyramid for a number of clubs including Stamford AFC, Spalding Utd, Yaxley FC, Cambridge City & March Town F.C.

== Career ==
A right-sided winger, Cotton signed for Boston United on 6 October 2006 from hometown club Blackstones, after impressing manager Steve Evans in a pre-season friendly game against the Pilgrims. He made his debut against Bristol Rovers the following day, coming on as a substitute in the second half. Ten days later he started the Football League Trophy match against Brighton & Hove Albion However, he made only one more appearance as a substitute on 28 October before leaving the club in January 2007, after which he rejoined Blackstones.

He subsequently joined Stamford in 2008, playing in the Evo Stick Division One South scoring 50 goals for the club and went on to having a second spell with Boston Utd in 2009 where he made 16 appearances scoring 1 goal against Nantwich Town before returning to Stamford AFC to finish the season. He then had a short spell at Soham Town Rangers playing in the Ryman Division One League. The following season, he joined Spalding United and won the United Counties Premier Division along with the League Cup.

In 2014, he made the move to fellow United Counties Premier Division side Yaxley FC winning the league cup and finishing leagues top scorer in 2015-16 season. He was part of the team that went on to win the United Counties League title and local cup in 2017/18 securing promotion to the Bet Victor Southern League Central Division.

After 8 years with Yaxley FC scoring 215 goals in 2022 he signed for fellow Northern Premier Midlands Division side Cambridge City FC where he spent two seasons, he finished the clubs top scorer for the 2022/23 season with the club winning the Cambs Invitational Cup in 2024. Cotton then joined United Counties Premier Division side March Town FC at the start of the 2024/25 season.
