= Thanasis Pindonis =

Greek footballer

Personal information
- Full name: Athanasios Pindonis
- Date of birth: 24 March 1986 (age 40)
- Place of birth: Drama, Greece
- Height: 1.83 m (6 ft 0 in)
- Position: Defensive midfielder

Team information
- Current team: Doxa Drama
- Number: 8

Youth career
- –2003: Kavala

Senior career*
Years	Team	Apps	(Gls)
2003–2008	Kavala	74	(1)
2008–2010	Doxa Drama	64	(8)
2010–2011	Kallithea	26	(1)
2011–2012	Anagennisi Dherynia	22	(0)
2012–2014	Olympiacos Volos	70	(12)
2014–2015	AEL	29	(5)
2015–2016	Panachaiki	23	(0)
2016–2017	Doxa Drama	0	(0)
2017–2018	Rodos	0	(0)
2018–2019	Kalamata	26	(6)
2019–	Doxa Drama	31	(1)
- * Club domestic league appearances and goals as of 8 May 2021

Thanasis Pindonis (Greek: Θανάσης Πινδώνης, born 24 March 1986) is a Greek professional footballer who plays as a defensive midfielder for Super League 2 club Doxa Drama.
