= Adam Rowntree =

English footballer

Personal information
- Date of birth: 18 April 1989 (age 37)
- Height: 1.70 m (5 ft 7 in)
- Position: Forward

Youth career
- Wallsend Boys Club

Senior career*
Years	Team	Apps	(Gls)
2007	Boston United	3	(0)
- Brigg Town
2008	Blyth Spartans	2	(1)
- Newcastle Benfield Bay Plastics
- Chester-le-Street Town
- Ryton & Crawcrook Albion
2012–????	North Shields		
- Dulwich Hill
- Heaton Stannington
- * Club domestic league appearances and goals

Adam Rowntree (born 18 April 1989) is an English footballer, who played three times in the Football League for Boston United.

He joined Boston United in January 2007, making his league debut as a late substitute in the 0–0 draw away to Wycombe Wanderers on 23 March 2007. He made two further appearances, both as substitute, in the league games away to Notts County and Hereford United.

He joined Blyth Spartans in 2008, making his debut against Redditch United on 18 October 2008. He played once more for Blyth, scoring against Gateshead three days later. He next joined Newcastle Benfield Bay Plastics.
