= 2010–11 Football League Cup =

Carling Cup, League Cup

Tournament details
- Country: England; Wales
- Dates: 10 August 2010 – 27 February 2011
- Teams: 92

Final positions
- Champions: Birmingham City (2nd title)
- Runners-up: Arsenal

Tournament statistics
- Matches played: 93
- Goals scored: 314 (3.38 per match)
- Top goal scorer(s): Carlton Cole; Scott Sinclair (4 goals)

The 2010–11 Football League Cup (known as the Carling Cup for sponsorship reasons) was the 51st season of the Football League Cup, a knock-out competition for the top 92 football clubs played in English football league system.

The winners were granted a place in the 2011–12 UEFA Europa League. However, in cases where a team had already gained a place in European competition via their league position or progress in other cup competitions, their place in the Europa League was deferred to the next best-placed league side not already qualified for European competitions.

Manchester United were the defending champions for the second successive season, but were knocked out in the fifth round by West Ham United.

The final was contested on 27 February 2011 between Arsenal and Birmingham City. Birmingham were the surprise 2–1 winners in the final to win just the second major trophy in their history. Birmingham City also won their first major trophy since 1963 (also a League Cup) and earned a place in European competition for the first time since 1961.

== First round ==
The draw for the first round took place on 16 June 2010, with matches played two months later on 10 August 2010.

Burnley and Hull City received a First Round bye as the highest ranked teams from the previous season's league placings. The other 70 of the 72 Football League clubs competed in the first round, divided into North and South sections. Each section was divided equally into a pot of seeded clubs and a pot of unseeded clubs. Clubs' rankings depend upon their finishing position in the 2009–10 season.

North
Tie no	Home team	Score^{1}	Away team	Attendance
1	Hartlepool United (3)	2–0	Sheffield United (2)	2,520
2	Leicester City (2)	4–3	Macclesfield Town (4)	6,142
3	Walsall (3)	0–1	Tranmere Rovers (3)	2,253
4	Carlisle United (3)	0–1	Huddersfield Town (3)	3,475
5	Stockport County (4)	0–5	Preston North End (2)	3,724
6	Barnsley (2)	0–1	Rochdale (3)	4,107
7	Morecambe (4)	2–0	Coventry City (2)	4,002
8	Doncaster Rovers (2)	1–1	Accrington Stanley (4)	4,603
Accrington Stanley won 2–1 after extra time
9	Chesterfield (4)	1–2	Middlesbrough (2)	6,509
10	Peterborough United (3)	4–1	Rotherham United (4)	4,145
11	Bradford City (4)	1–1	Nottingham Forest (2)	5,175
Bradford City won 2–1 after extra time
12	Leeds United (2)	4–0	Lincoln City (4)	12,602
13	Sheffield Wednesday (3)	1–0	Bury (4)	7,390
14	Scunthorpe United (2)	2–1	Oldham Athletic (3)	2,602
15	Crewe Alexandra (4)	1–0	Derby County (2)	3,778

South
Tie no	Home team	Score^{1}	Away team	Attendance
1	Exeter City (3)	2–2	Ipswich Town (2)	4,520
Ipswich Town won 3–2 after extra time
2	Southend United (4)	2–2	Bristol City (3)	2,940
Southend won 3–2 after extra time
3	Southampton (3)	2–0	Bournemouth (3)	17,135
4	Brentford (3)	2–1	Cheltenham Town (4)	2,049
5	Queens Park Rangers (2)	1–3	Port Vale (4)	6,619
6	Torquay United (4)	0–0	Reading (2)	2,832
Reading won 1–0 after extra time
7	Norwich City (2)	4–1	Gillingham (4)	13,068
8	Stevenage (4)	1–2	Portsmouth (2)	4,236
9	Shrewsbury Town (4)	4–3	Charlton Athletic (3)	3,700
10	Cardiff City (2)	1–1	Burton Albion	6,080
Cardiff City won 4–1 after extra time
11	Northampton Town (4)	2–0	Brighton & Hove Albion (3)	2,431
12	Swansea City (2)	3–0	Barnet (2)	6,644
13	Plymouth Argyle (3)	0–1	Notts County (3)	5,454
14	Wycombe Wanderers (4)	1–1	Millwall (2)	3,028
Millwall won 2–1 after extra time
15	Oxford United (4)	6–1	Bristol Rovers (3)	5,008
16	Milton Keynes Dons (3)	2–1	Dagenham & Redbridge (3)	3,502
17	Hereford United (4)	0–3	Colchester United (3)	1,996
18	Yeovil Town (3)	0–1	Crystal Palace (2)	3,720
19	Aldershot Town (4)	0–3	Watford (2)	3,292
20	Swindon Town (3)	1–2	Leyton Orient (3)	4,450

^{1} Score after 90 minutes

== Second round ==
The 13 Premier League teams not involved in European competitions entered at this stage along with the winners from the first round plus Burnley and Hull City, who had received a First Round bye. If there is a draw at full-time there will be extra time followed by a penalty shootout if the scores are still level. From the second round onwards, the teams are no longer split geographically. The draw for the second round took place on the evening of 11 August 2010, after the first-round matches had been completed, and the matches were played in the week beginning 23 August 2010.

Tie no	Home team	Score^{1}	Away team	Attendance
1	Accrington Stanley (4)	2–3	Newcastle United (1)	4,098
2	Portsmouth (2)	1–1	Crystal Palace (2)	8,412
1–1 after extra time–Portsmouth won 4–3 on penalties
3	Leeds United (2)	1–2	Leicester City (2)	16,509
4	Wolverhampton Wanderers (1)	1–1	Southend United (4)	10,284
Wolverhampton Wanderers won 2–1 after extra time
5	Blackburn Rovers (1)	3–1	Norwich City (2)	9,235
6	Milton Keynes Dons (3)	3–3	Blackpool (1)	7,458
Milton Keynes Dons won 4–3 after extra time
7	Tranmere Rovers (3)	1–3	Swansea City (2)	2,450
8	Everton (1)	5–1	Huddersfield Town (3)	28,901
9	Peterborough United (3)	2–1	Cardiff City (2)	3,806
10	Reading (2)	2–2	Northampton Town (4)	6,986
3–3 after extra time–Northampton Town won 4–2 on penalties
11	Scunthorpe United (2)	4–2	Sheffield Wednesday (3)	4,680
12	Brentford (3)	2–1	Hull City (2)	3,335
13	Sunderland (1)	2–0	Colchester United (3)	13,532
14	Leyton Orient (3)	0–2	West Bromwich Albion (1)	2,349
15	Morecambe (4)	1–3	Burnley (2)	5,003
16	Birmingham City (1)	3–2	Rochdale (3)	6,431
17	Crewe Alexandra (4)	0–0	Ipswich Town (2)	3,309
Ipswich Town won 1–0 after extra time
18	Watford (2)	1–2	Notts County (3)	6,434
19	West Ham United (1)	1–0	Oxford United (4)	20,902
20	Southampton (3)	0–1	Bolton Wanderers (1)	10,251
21	Bradford City (4)	1–1	Preston North End (2)	4,221
Preston North End won 2–1 after extra time
22	Fulham (1)	6–0	Port Vale (4)	9,031
23	Millwall (2)	2–1	Middlesbrough (2)	6,704
24	Stoke City (1)	2–1	Shrewsbury Town (4)	11,995
25	Hartlepool United (3)	0–3	Wigan Athletic (1)	3,196

^{1} Score after 90 minutes

== Third round ==
The seven Premier League teams involved in European competition entered at this stage, along with the winners from the second round. The draw for the Third Round took place on 28 August 2010, after the second-round games had been played. The matches were played in the week beginning 20 September 2010. Northampton Town were the only League Two side to reach this round of the tournament.

Tie no	Home team	Score^{1}	Away team	Attendance
1	Brentford (3)	1–1	Everton (1)	8,960
1–1 after extra time–Brentford won 4–3 on penalties
2	Portsmouth (2)	1–2	Leicester City (2)	8,327
3	Stoke City (1)	2–0	Fulham (1)	12,778
4	Chelsea (1)	3–4	Newcastle United (1)	41,511
5	Aston Villa (1)	3–1	Blackburn Rovers (1)	18,753
6	Tottenham Hotspur (1)	1–1	Arsenal (1)	35,883
Arsenal won 4–1 after extra time
7	Millwall (2)	1–2	Ipswich Town (3)	5,070
8	Wolverhampton Wanderers (1)	1–1	Notts County (3)	11,516
Wolverhampton Wanderers won 4–2 after extra time
9	Burnley (2)	1–0	Bolton Wanderers (2)	17,602
10	Birmingham City (1)	3–1	Milton Keynes Dons (3)	9,450
11	Liverpool (1)	1–1	Northampton Town (4)	22,577
2–2 after extra time–Northampton Town won 4–2 on penalties
12	Scunthorpe United (2)	2–5	Manchester United (1)	9,077
13	West Bromwich Albion (1)	2–1	Manchester City (1)	10,418
14	Sunderland (1)	1–2	West Ham United (1)	21,907
15	Peterborough United (3)	1–3	Swansea City (2)	4,164
16	Wigan Athletic (1)	2–1	Preston North End (2)	6,987

^{1} Score after 90 minutes

== Fourth round ==
The Fourth Round draw took place on 25 September 2010, and the matches were played on the week commencing 25 October 2010. For the second consecutive round, Northampton Town was the lowest ranked remaining side, being the lone representative from League Two. All four leagues involved in this competition had representation in the Fourth Round for the first time since the 2006–07 competition.

Tie no	Home team	Score^{1}	Away team	Attendance
1	Newcastle United (1)	0–4	Arsenal (1)	33,157
2	Birmingham City (1)	1–1	Brentford (3)	15,166
1–1 after extra time–Birmingham City won 4–3 on penalties
3	Wigan Athletic (1)	2–0	Swansea City (2)	11,705
4	Aston Villa (1)	1–1	Burnley (2)	34,618
Aston Villa won 2–1 after extra time
5	Leicester City (2)	1–4	West Bromwich Albion (1)	16,957
6	Manchester United (1)	3–2	Wolverhampton Wanderers (1)	46,083
7	West Ham United (1)	1–1	Stoke City (1)	25,304
West Ham United won 3–1 after extra time
8	Ipswich Town (2)	3–1	Northampton Town (4)	12,929

^{1} Score after 90 minutes

== Fifth round ==
Ipswich Town was the lowest ranked side left in the competition, and the sole remaining representative of the Championship in the fifth round draw, which took place on 30 October 2010. Matches were played in the week commencing 29 November 2010.

30 November 2010
19:45

Arsenal (1)	2–0	Wigan Athletic (1)
Alcaraz 42' (o.g.); Bendtner 67'	Report

Emirates Stadium, London
Attendance: 59,525
Referee: Martin Atkinson (West Yorkshire)

1 December 2010
19:45

Birmingham City (1)	2–1	Aston Villa (1)
Larsson 12' (pen.); Žigić 84'	Report	Agbonlahor 30'

St Andrew's, Birmingham
Attendance: 27,679
Referee: Chris Foy (Merseyside)

30 November 2010
19:45

West Ham United (1)	4–0	Manchester United (1)
Spector 22', 37'; Cole 56', 66'	Report

Upton Park, London
Attendance: 33,551
Referee: Mark Clattenburg (County Durham)

1 December 2010
19:45

Ipswich Town (2)	1–0	West Bromwich Albion (1)
Leadbitter 69'	Report

Portman Road, Ipswich
Attendance: 11,363
Referee: Mike Jones (Cheshire)

== Semi-finals ==
The semi-final draw took place on 1 December 2010, after the completion of the Fifth Round matches. The first leg matches were played the week commencing 10 January 2011, with the second legs a fortnight later.

=== First leg ===
11 January 2011
19:45

West Ham United (1)	2–1	Birmingham City (1)
Noble 13'; Cole 78'	Report	Ridgewell 56'

Upton Park, London
Attendance: 29,034
Referee: Phil Dowd (Staffordshire)

12 January 2011
19:45

Ipswich Town (2)	1–0	Arsenal (1)
Priskin 78'	Report

Portman Road, Ipswich
Attendance: 29,146
Referee: Martin Atkinson (West Yorkshire)

=== Second leg ===
25 January 2011
19:45

Arsenal (1)	3–0	Ipswich Town (2)
Bendtner 61'; Koscielny 64'; Fàbregas 77'	Report

Emirates Stadium, London
Attendance: 59,387
Referee: Mark Halsey (Lancashire)

Arsenal won 3–1 on aggregate.

26 January 2011
19:45

Birmingham City (1)	3–1 (a.e.t.)	West Ham United (1)
Bowyer 59'; Johnson 79'; Gardner 94'	Report	Cole 31'

St Andrew's, Birmingham
Attendance: 27,519
Referee: Howard Webb (South Yorkshire)

Birmingham City won 4–3 on aggregate.

== Final ==
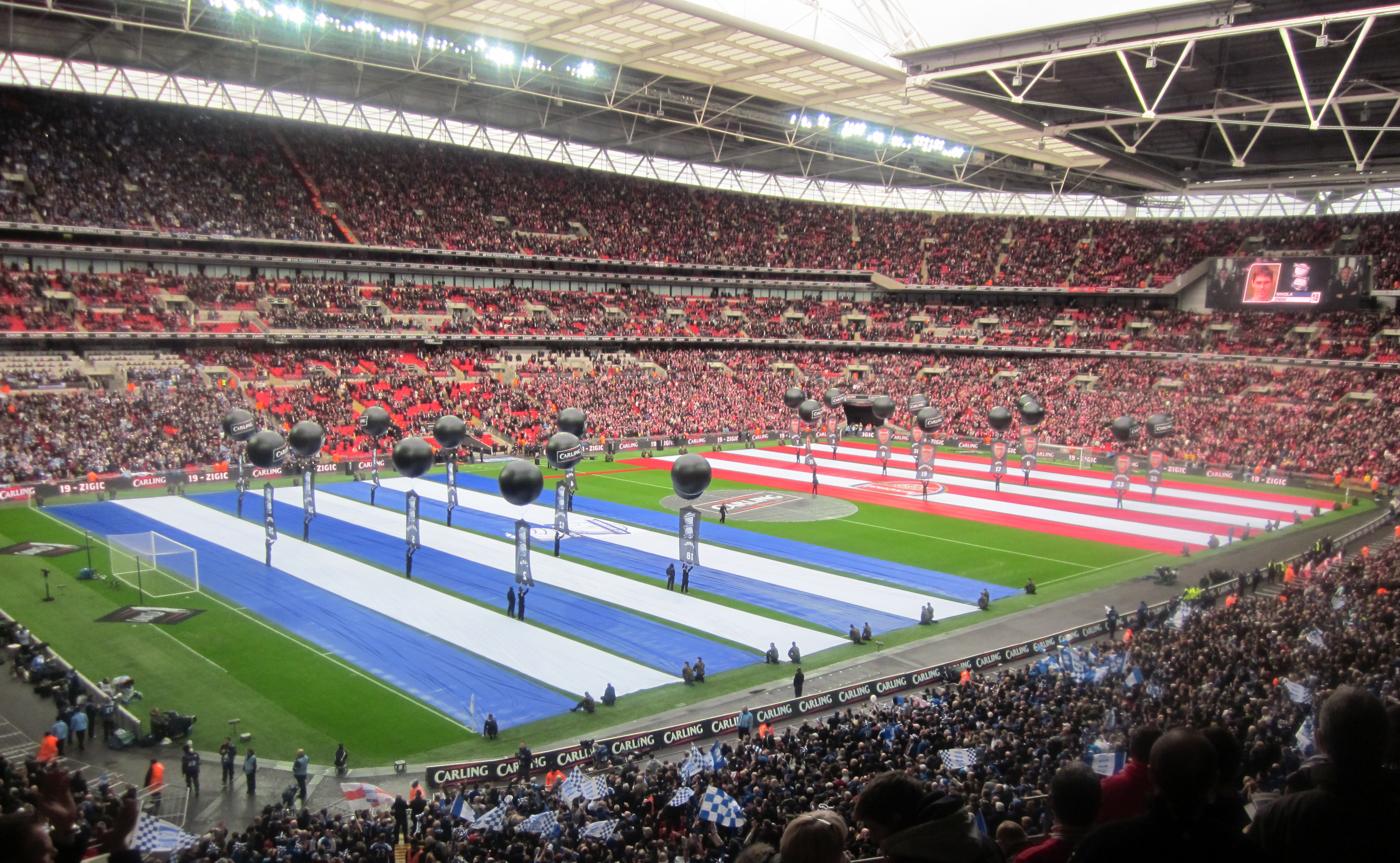
Pre-match scenes at Wembley Stadium

The final was played at Wembley Stadium, London, on Sunday, 27 February 2011.

27 February 2011
16:00 GMT

Arsenal (1)	1–2	Birmingham City (1)
Van Persie 39'	Report	Žigić 28'; Martins 89'

Wembley Stadium, London
Attendance: 88,851
Referee: Mike Dean (Cheshire)

== Prize money ==
The prize money was awarded by the Football League. The winners of the League Cup won £100,000 and the runners-up won £50,000. The losing semi-finalists each took home £25,000.
