= Robbie Burns (footballer) =

English footballer

Personal information
- Full name: Robbie Lee Burns
- Date of birth: 15 November 1990 (age 35)
- Place of birth: Milton Keynes, England
- Position: Midfielder

Team information
- Current team: Hitchin Town

Youth career
- 2007–2009: Leicester City

Senior career*
Years	Team	Apps	(Gls)
2008–2010	Leicester City	0	(0)
2009	→ Tranmere Rovers (loan)	2	(0)
2010–2013	Nuneaton Town	?	(?)
2013–2014	Hitchin Town	?	(?)
2014–2015	Rugby Town	22	(4)
2015–2017	Hitchin Town	?	(?)
2018–????	Hitchin Town	?	(?)
2022	Hitchin Town	?	(?)
- * Club domestic league appearances and goals as of 21:01, 27 April 2009 (UTC)

Robbie Lee Burns (born 14 November 1990) is an English professional footballer who most recently played as a midfielder for Hitchin Town.

== Career ==
Burns, who was born in Milton Keynes, started his career at Leicester City where he was a product of their youth academy after joining the club at the age or 12. He signed his first professional contract with the club on 20 March 2009, signing a one-year deal.

On the same day he joined Tranmere Rovers on loan for the rest of the 2008–09 season. He made his debut for Tranmere on 25 April, coming off the bench as a 76th-minute substitute in their 3–1 defeat against Leeds United replacing Edrissa Sonko. He made his second appearance a week later in Tranmere's 1–1 against Yeovil Town replacing Charlie Barnett.

On 17 May 2010, Burns was released by Leicester along with Stephen Clemence, Levi Porter, Billy Kee, Carl Pentney, Astrit Ajdarevic and Alex Cisak.

He was given a trial with Ipswich Town in the 2010 pre-season campaign. He played and scored in Ipswich's friendly against Leiston. He signed for Conference North side Nuneaton Town in September 2010.

He played for Rugby Town between November 2014 and summer 2015, scoring 4 goals in 22 league games. In January 2018, he joined Hitchin Town for his fourth spell at the club.
