= Jamie Stevens =

English footballer

Personal information
- Date of birth: 25 February 1989 (age 37)
- Place of birth: Holbeach, England
- Position: Defender

Team information
- Current team: Wisbech Town
- Number: 4

Youth career
- Rushden & Diamonds

Senior career*
Years	Team	Apps	(Gls)
2006–2007	Boston United	12	(2)
2007–2009	Crawley Town	49	(2)
2009	Northwich Victoria	7	(0)
2009	→ Ebbsfleet United (loan)	8	(0)
2009–2011	Farnborough	53	(1)
2011–2013	Holbeach United	58	(6)
2013–2014	Spalding United	33	(3)
2014–2017	Holbeach United	74	(0)
2017–2018	Wisbech Town	39	(3)
- * Club domestic league appearances and goals as of 22:09, 09 September 2018 (UTC)

Jamie Stevens (born 25 February 1989) is an English professional footballer currently at Wisbech Town. His versatility enables him to operate in any defensive position, however his most natural position is centre back.

== Career ==
Born in Holbeach, Lincolnshire, Stevens started his career in the youth team at Rushden & Diamonds, before joining Boston United on a two-year scholarship. Stevens scored on his professional début against Notts County on 4 November 2006.

Stevens was a consistent performer in Boston United's first team in 2007. He scored the only goal against Chester City on the 21 April 2007, a win that kept alive Boston's chances of survival in the Football League.

But, Boston suffered a double relegation to the Conference North and Stevens left the club to join his former manager at Boston - Steve Evans at Conference National side Crawley Town.

Stevens performed consistently well in his first season at the Broadfield Stadium, making 43 league appearances and getting on the scoresheet twice. His first goal in Crawley Town colours came in their 5-0 thrashing of Droylsden in September 2007.

In January 2008, he spent time on trial with Championship side Ipswich Town, however a deal could not be reached between the two clubs, and he returned to Crawley Town. In the summer of 2008 he agreed a deal to stay with the West Sussex club for the 2008–09 season.

However, Stevens struggled with injury through the 2008–09 season and was then unable to regain his place in the team and signed an 18-month contract with Northwich Victoria on 27 January 2009. In March 2009 he joined Ebbsfleet United on loan until the end of the season.

After his loan with Ebbsfleet expired and Northwich were relegated to the Conference North in 2008–09 season, Stevens linked up with previous Northwich boss Steve King at Farnborough. Stevens made thirty-four appearances as Farnborough were promoted as champions from the Southern Football League Premier Division.

Jamie signed for United Counties League side Holbeach United in 2011 before signing for local rivals Spalding United in 2013. After winning the United Counties League two consecutive seasons with both Holbeach United and Spalding United, Stevens transferred back to his hometown club Holbeach United.

In May 2017, Stevens agreed to join Holbeach's local United Counties League Premier Division rivals Wisbech Town along with teammate Josh Ford.
