= Levi Porter =

English footballer (born 1987)

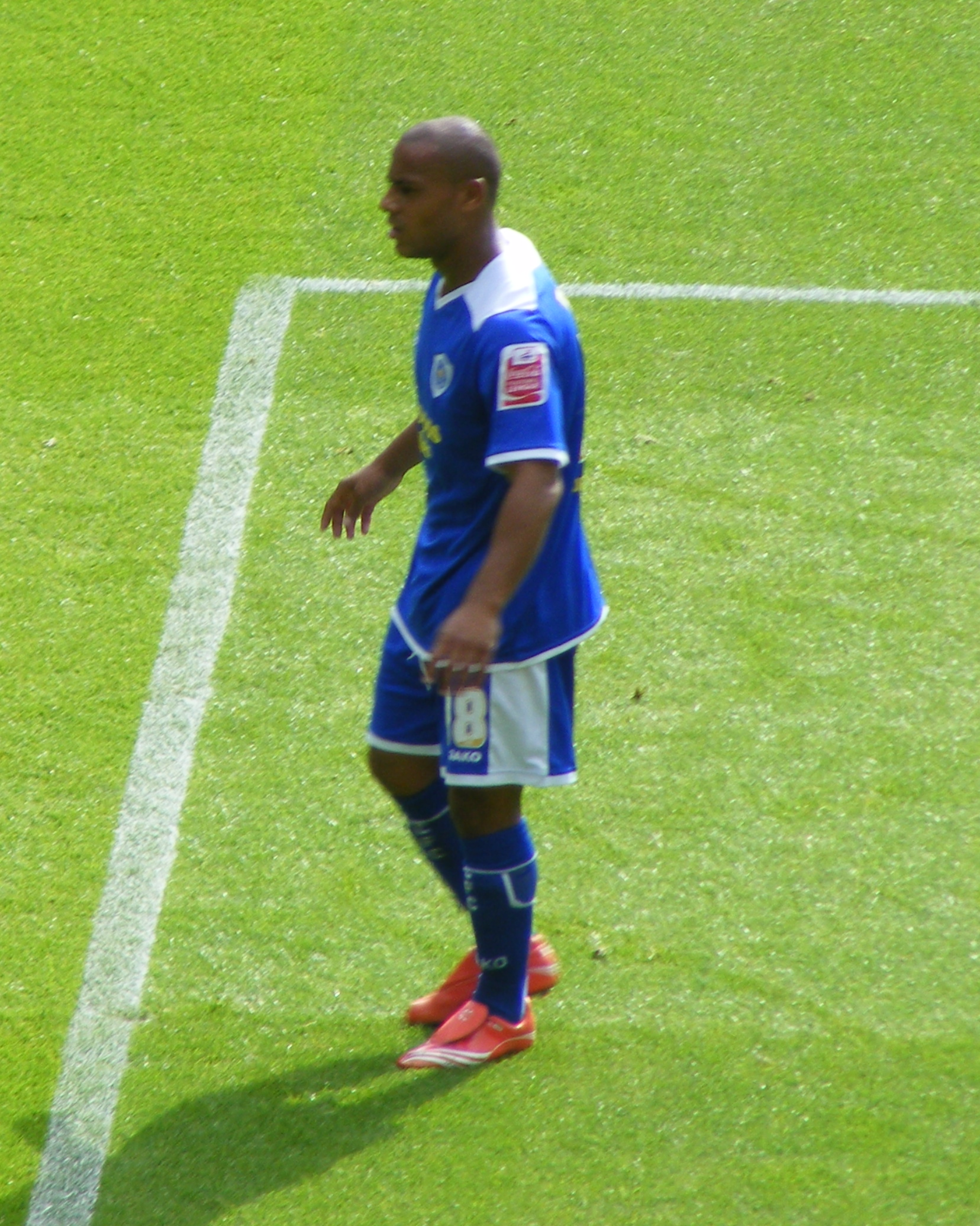

Personal information
- Full name: Levi Roger Porter
- Date of birth: 6 April 1987 (age 39)
- Place of birth: Leicester, England
- Position: Winger

Youth career
- 2005: Leicester City

Senior career*
Years	Team	Apps	(Gls)
2006–2010	Leicester City	39	(3)
2009	→ Mansfield Town (loan)	2	(0)
2011	Hinckley United	3	(0)
2012–2013	Histon	18	(1)
2013–2014	Oadby Town	7	(6)
2014	Blaby & Whetstone Athletic	1	(1)
2014–2018	Shepshed Dynamo		
2018–2019	Melton Town		

International career^{‡}
2003	England U16	5	(0)
2003–2004	England U17	3	(0)
- * Club domestic league appearances and goals as of 22:00, 29 July 2019 (UTC) ‡ National team caps and goals as of 22:00, 29 July 2019 (UTC)

Levi Roger Porter (born 6 April 1987) is an English footballer who most recently played for Melton Town.

== Playing career ==
Porter signed a one-year contract extension with Leicester on 8 February 2006. He made his debut in a 3–1 win over Ipswich Town on 12 August 2006, scoring his first league goal in a 2–2 draw against Plymouth Argyle on 11 November 2006. He was man of the match on 9 December when he scored a last minute winner against Wolverhampton Wanderers to give Leicester a 2–1 away win. Porter put in another man of the match performance in a 2–2 FA Cup draw against Fulham, during which he set up Danny Cadamarteri's last minute equaliser. He played a total of 34 league games, scoring three goals as Leicester avoided relegation in the 2006–07 season.

On 31 October 2007, Porter was stretchered off in a 4–3 League Cup defeat to Chelsea at Stamford Bridge, during which he assisted Leicester's second goal. Suspected to be cruciate knee ligament damage, he was sidelined for up to three months after scans revealed that the injury was mainly damage to his medial collateral ligament. The injury ruled him out for the rest of the 2007–08 season as Leicester were relegated from the Championship.

In the 2008–09 season, despite fully recovering from his knee injury, Porter played only one league and one League Cup match as Leicester regained promotion as League One champions. On 11 September 2009, Porter joined Mansfield Town on loan for a month, making his debut in a 3–2 defeat to Stevenage Borough the next day but making only two appearances.

On 17 May 2010 Porter was released by Leicester along with Stephen Clemence, Billy Kee, Robbie Burns, Carl Pentney, Astrit Ajdarevic and Alex Cisak.

On 20 September 2011 Porter signed for Conference North side Hinckley United.

In December 2012 Porter signed for Conference North side Histon, but has most recently been playing for Shepshed Dynamo in the Midland Football League.

On 5 July 2018, Porter signed for Melton Town.

== Personal life ==
His cousin, Ellis Porter, formerly played for Leicester City's youth team but left and subsequently retired from football.
