= Aman Verma (footballer) =

English footballer

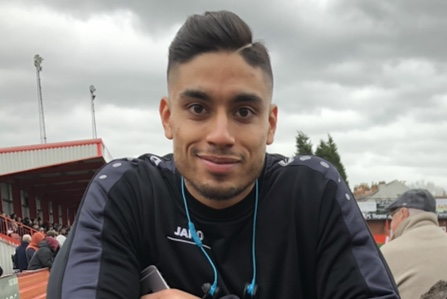
- Verma in 2019

Personal information
- Full name: Aman Kumar Verma
- Date of birth: 3 January 1987 (age 39)
- Place of birth: Leicester, England
- Height: 1.82 m (5 ft 11 1/2 in)
- Position: Midfielder

Team information
- Current team: Anstey Nomads

Youth career
- –2007: Leicester City

Senior career*
| Years | Team | Apps | (Gls) |
| 2007–2008 | Leicester City | 0 | (0) |
| 2008 | Bedworth United | 27 | (8) |
| 2008–2009 | Redditch United | | |
| 2009–2011 | Leicester City | 0 | (0) |
| 2009 | → Crewe Alexandra (loan) | 7 | (0) |
| 2010 | → Histon (loan) | 8 | (0) |
| 2010 | → Kidderminster Harriers (loan) | 1 | (0) |
| 2010–2011 | → Darlington (loan) | 26 | (4) |
| 2011–2012 | Kettering Town | 22 | (3) |
| 2011 | → Mansfield (loan) | 4 | (1) |
| 2012–2013 | Floriana | 14 | (4) |
| 2013 | Hinckley United | | |
| 2013 | Kettering Town | 10 | (2) |
| 2013 | Stockport County | 9 | (0) |
| 2013–2014 | Corby Town | 21 | (7) |
| 2014–2016 | Kidderminster Harriers | 53 | (6) |
| 2015–2016 | → Torquay United (loan) | 22 | (1) |
| 2016–2017 | Torquay United | 41 | (2) |
| 2017–2019 | Tamworth | 63 | (6) |
| 2019 | Nuneaton Borough | 13 | (1) |
| 2019–2021 | Mickelover Sports | | |
| 2021–2022 | Ilkeston Town | | |
| 2022– | Anstey Nomads | | |
- * Club domestic league appearances and goals as of 22:11, 15 September 2021 (UTC)

Aman Kumar Verma (born 3 January 1987) is an English footballer who plays for Anstey Nomads, where he plays as a midfielder.

== Playing career ==
=== Leicester City ===
Born in Leicester, Leicestershire, Verma started his career at Leicester City in their youth academy however he failed to break into the first team squad and was eventually released.

=== Bedworth United ===
After his release, he teamed up with Bedworth United.

=== Redditch United ===
His performances at Bedworth United, got him a move up the football pyramid, as he joined Conference North side Redditch United. In fact Verma's performances were that impressive, that he was given an opportunity to return to his former club Leicester City.

=== Leicester City ===
In December 2008, Verma rejoined his former club Leicester City on trial, where he did enough to secure a six-month contract. In May 2009, he was given a one-year contract extension. On 6 August 2009, Verma joined Crewe Alexandra on trial, joining on 10 August on loan for three months. He made his debut a day later in a 2–1 League Cup defeat to Blackpool, replacing James Bailey at half time. He made his league debut in a 4–0 win at Grimsby Town on 15 August, but returned to Leicester on 3 November, two weeks early having fallen out of favour at Crewe. Verma had his first call up to the main Leicester squad as an unused substitute in a 2–1 win at Blackpool on 6 February 2010.

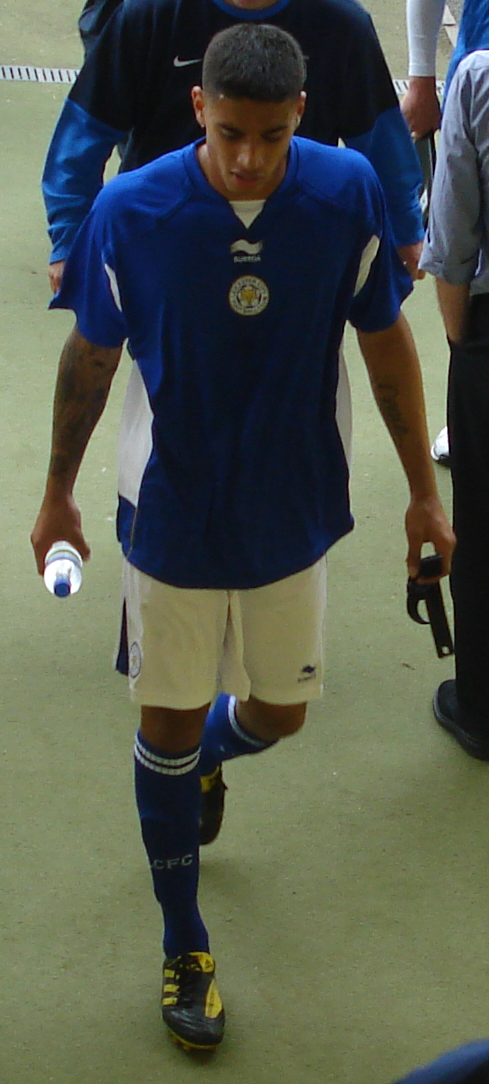
Verma playing for Leicester City in a friendly in 2010.

He joined Conference National club Histon on loan for the remainder of the 2009–10 season on 26 March 2010, In May 2010, Verma was awarded with another contract extension by Leicester. He finally made his senior debut for the club as a substitute in a 4–3 League Cup win over Macclesfield on 10 August 2010. On 11 August, Verma was part of the reserves squad that won the Totesport.com Cup in a 2–1 win over Oldham Athletic reserves at Quorn FC.

On 27 August 2010, he joined Conference National club Kidderminster Harriers on loan for a month. However, he returned to Leicester after breaking his hand during his debut against Newport County. On 19 November, Verma joined Darlington on loan until January 2011.

Leicester City confirmed on 14 May 2011 that Verma would not be offered a new contract when it expires on 30 June 2011.

=== Kettering Town ===
Following his second release from Leicester City, Verma agreed a one-year deal with Conference National side Kettering Town on 21 July 2011.

=== Floriana ===
Maltese Premier League side Floriana appointed Mark Wright as their new manager, and on 16 August 2012, the club confirmed the signings of Aman Verma, on a one-year deal and Carl Tremarco, on loan from Macclesfield Town.

=== Corby Town ===
Verma signed for Corby Town in 2013, following a brief spell with Stockport County, but left the club on 17 March 2014.

=== Kidderminster Harriers ===
On 20 March 2014, he signed on non contract terms for Kidderminster Harriers. He made his debut as a substitute in a 1–0 home loss to Grimsby Town. On 6 June 2014, Verma signed a one-year contract with Kidderminster. He scored his first goal on 4 October 2014, in a 1–1 draw at home to AFC Telford. His second goal came in a 1–1 draw at home to Wrexham, Verma scoring from 30 yards in the second minute. Verma returned from injury on 26 December 2014, to play in a more forward role just behind the striker and it paid off as he netted two of the goals in a 3–2 away win to Forest Green Rovers.

At the end of the season he signed a new one-year contract. On the opening day of the 2015–16 season, Verma netted a stoppage time equaliser against title-favourites Grimsby Town in a 2–2 draw. After not appearing within the squad Verma was loaned out to Torquay United on 5 November 2015 where he scored one goal in 23 appearances. Verma signed a permanent contract to remain with Torquay for 2016–17 season.

=== Torquay United ===
On 2 June 2016, Verma signed a permanent contract to remain with Torquay United for 2016–17 season. It didn't take long for Verma to show his worth, after impressive displays in the engine room of the side, he showed much versatility as he moved to right-back towards the end of the season and performed admirably, he also performed well in his natural position as a midfielder and as a striker. Player-manager Kevin Nicholson was happy to have Verma at the club on a permanent deal.

=== Tamworth ===
Aman Verma signed for Conference North side Tamworth on 27 June 2017, with the player signing a two-year deal with the club. Verma had been offered an extension at Torquay United, but decided to decline, and move closer to Leicestershire for family reasons.

Verma made his Tamworth debut on the opening day of the 2017–18 season, in a home fixture against Bradford Park Avenue on 5 August 2017, a game the visitors won 1–0.

In a very disappointing season for Tamworth, Verma was one of the brighter notes, and was nominated in the running to win the Supporters' Player of the Year, along with Connor Taylor and Andy Burns, an award eventually claimed by Connor Taylor on 23 April 2018.

A very disappointing second half of the season saw Tamworth relegated from the Conference North on 23 April 2018.

Aman managed to make 40 appearances, scoring 5 goals from midfield during the 2017–18 season with Tamworth.

Following relegation to the newly formed Southern League Premier Central, Verma was one of four players still contracted to Tamworth for the 2018–19 season, along with Rhys Sharpe, Tom Shaw and Akwasi Asante.

Aman was injured in a Southern League Premier Central fixture away at Biggleswade Town on 19 January 2019, following a collision with teammate Claudio Dias, and was substituted on the 7th minute, and replaced by Kieran Holsgrove. Biggleswade Town won the match 3–0, which turned out to be the last match for manager Dennis Greene, who was relieved of his duties the following day.

Following the injury, Verma didn't feature for Tamworth for the remainder of the season, he managed to make 23 appearances, and scored one goal, as Tamworth finished in 12th position in their first season in the Southern League Premier Central.

=== Nuneaton Borough ===
On 11 June 2019, it was confirmed that Verma had signed for Southern League Premier Central rivals Nuneaton Borough. Aman managed 13 appearances, scoring one goal for the club, before been released on 18 November 2019.

=== Mickleover Sports ===
On 25 November 2019, Aman signed for Northern Premier League Premier League club Mickleover Sports.

=== Ilkeston Town ===
He signed for Northern Premier League Division One Midlands side Ilkeston Town on a free transfer in August 2021.

== Honours ==
Darlington

- FA Trophy: 2010–11
