= 2011–12 Leicester City F.C. season =

107th season in existence of Leicester City

Leicester City
2011–12 season
- Chairman: Vichai Raksriaksorn
- Manager: Sven-Göran Eriksson (until 24 October 2011); Jon Rudkin and Mike Stowell (caretakers); Nigel Pearson (from 15 November 2011)
- Stadium: King Power Stadium
- Football League Championship: 9th
- FA Cup: Sixth Round
- League Cup: Third Round
- Top goalscorer: League: David Nugent (15); All: David Nugent (16)
- Highest home attendance: 27,720 (vs. Leeds United, Championship, 6 November 2011)
- Lowest home attendance: 16,210 (vs. Nottingham Forest, FA Cup, 17 January 2012)
- Average home league attendance: 23,036
Home colours	Away colours	Third colours

The 2011–12 Leicester City F.C. season was the club's 107th season in the English football league system and their 60th (non-consecutive) season in the second tier of English football. This was their third consecutive season in the Football League Championship.

The summer saw Leicester spend big in an attempt to gain promotion back to the Premier League, but an inconsistent start saw manager Sven-Göran Eriksson sacked after a 3–0 defeat at home to struggling Millwall saw Leicester sitting in 13th position after 13 games.

After days of negotiations, Nigel Pearson was finally re-appointed as manager on 15 November 2011, starting his second spell at the club after leaving for Hull City 17 months earlier. However, the club continued their inconsistent form under Pearson and sat mid-table for virtually the entire season before eventually finishing in 9th place.

== Pre-season ==
=== Pre-season events ===
Note: This section does not include close season transfers or pre-season match results, which are listed in their own sections below.

- 18 May 2011 – Asia Football Investments led by Vichai and Aiyawatt Raksriaksorn acquire a 100% stake in the club's ownership.
- 7 June 2011 – Susan Whelan named as club chief executive. Simon Capper named as new finance director and Andrew Neville named as football director.
- 5 July 2011 – Leicester's home ground The Walkers' Stadium is renamed The King Power Stadium due to a change in sponsorship.
- 5 July 2011 – First team coach Dietmar Hamann leaves the club to become manager of Stockport County.
- 5 August 2011 – Aleksandar Tunchev signs a one-year contract extension which ends in 2012.

=== Kit and sponsorship ===
On 6 May 2011 a preview of the 2011–12 home kit was released on the official Leicester City website. It was announced that the kit would be worn against Ipswich Town in the last game of the 2010–11 season. On 7 May 2011 the home kit was revealed to have a collar for the first time since the 2001–2002 season with white shorts and blue socks with a white trim.

=== Friendlies ===
Win Draw Loss Upcoming fixture

12 July 2011 Stockholm Football Trophy	IK Sirius	1–3	Leicester City	Uppsala
18:00 BST	Ogbu 84'	Report	Waghorn 37'; Moussa 45'; Kermorgant 56'	Stadium: Studenternas IP

14 July 2011 Stockholm Football Trophy	RCD Mallorca	1–1	Leicester City	Stockholm
19:00 BST	Hemed 15'; De Guzmán (red card) 73'	Report	Gallagher 50' (pen.); Danns (red card) 84'	Stadium: Söderstadion; Referee: Martin Ingvarsson

18 July 2011 Stockholm Football Trophy	Vasalunds IF	1–4	Leicester City	Stockholm
18:00 BST	Ali 85'	Report	Howard 49' (pen.), 60', 77' (pen.), 89'	Stadium: Enskede IP

20 July 2011 Kärnten Cup	Bursaspor	0–0	Leicester City	Klagenfurt
17:30 BST		Report		Stadium: Welzenegg Stadium

23 July 2011 Kärnten Cup	Valencia	1–0	Leicester City	Sankt Veit an der Glan
18:30 BST	Jonas 22'	Report		Stadium: Jacques-Lemans Arena; Referee: G. Meschnark

26 July 2011 Friendly	Kettering Town	1–1	Leicester City XI	Kettering
19:45 BST	Marna 14'	Report	Moussa 18'	Stadium: Elgood's Brewery Arena; Attendance: 1,567

30 July 2011 npower Challenge Cup	Leicester City	1–2	Real Madrid	Leicester
17:15 BST	Dyer 89'	Report	Callejón 43'; Benzema 62'	Stadium: King Power Stadium; Attendance: 32,188; Referee: Andre Marriner
Note: Leicester City started the match wearing their home kit then changed into their away kit at half-time.

== Events ==
Note:This section does not include transfers or match results, which are listed in their own sections below.

- 21 September 2011 – Sol Bamba signs a new contract until 2014.
- 7 October 2011 – Tom Hopper signs a professional contract until 2013.
- 24 October 2011 – Sven-Göran Eriksson and Derek Fazackerley left their posts as Manager and Assistant Manager by mutual agreement.
- 24 October 2011 – Mike Stowell and Jon Rudkin are placed in temporary charge of first team affairs as joint caretaker managers.
- 15 November 2011 – Nigel Pearson is re-appointed manager, 17 months after leaving the club. Craig Shakespeare and Steve Walsh are also re-appointed as his assistants.
- 10 January 2012 – Cian Bolger signs new deal until June 2013.
- 12 January 2012 – Chris Short leaves his post as fitness coach.
- 19 January 2012 – Liam Moore signs a contract extension which ends in 2013.
- 19 January 2012 – Shane Byrne signs a contract extension which ends in 2013.
- 25 February 2012 – Matt Mills is stripped of the captaincy.
- 29 February 2012 – Jeffrey Schlupp signs a new contract until 2015.
- 1 March 2012 – Bruno Berner announces his retirement from professional football.

== Players and staff ==
=== 2011–12 squad ===
- This section lists players who were in Leicester's first team squad at any point during the 2011–12 season
- Asterisks indicates player left mid-season
- Hash symbol indicates player retired mid-season
- Italics indicate loan player

No.	Nationality	Name	Position	Joined	Signed from
Goalkeepers
1	(Denmark)	Kasper Schmeichel	GK	2011	(England) Leeds United
21	(England)	Chris Weale	GK	2009	(England) Bristol City
25	(Republic of Ireland)	Conrad Logan	GK	2004	Youth
31	(England)	Adam Smith	GK	2010	(England) Middlesbrough
	(United States)	Patrick Lane*	GK	2011	Unattached
Defenders
2	(England)	Lee Peltier	RB / RW / CB / DM	2011	(England) Huddersfield Town
3	(England)	Paul Konchesky	LB	2011	(England) Liverpool
4	(Ghana)	John Paintsil	RB	2011	Unattached
5	(England)	Matt Mills	CB	2011	(England) Reading
6	(Ivory Coast)	Sol Bamba	CB	2011	(Scotland) Hibernian
12	(Republic of Ireland)	Sean St Ledger	CB	2011	(England) Preston North End
15	(Switzerland)	Bruno Berner#	LB / CB / DM	2008	(England) Blackburn Rovers
16	(England)	Michael Ball*	LB	2011	Unattached
26	(England)	Wes Morgan	CB	2012	(England) Nottingham Forest
30	(England)	Tom Kennedy	LB	2010	(England) Rochdale
32	(England)	Tom Parkes	CB	2009	Youth
33	(Bulgaria)	Aleksander Tunchev	CB / LB	2008	(Bulgaria) CSKA Sofia
34	(England)	Liam Moore	CB / RB	2011	Youth
36	(England)	George Taft	CB	2011	Youth
	(Republic of Ireland)	Cian Bolger	CB	2009	Youth
Midfielders
8	(England)	Matt Oakley	CM	2008	(England) Derby County
10	(Wales)	Andy King	CM / DM / AM	2006	Youth
11	(England)	Lloyd Dyer	LW / RW	2008	(England) Milton Keynes Dons
16	(England)	Danny Drinkwater	CM	2012	(England) Manchester United
17	(England)	Michael Johnson*	CM	Loan	(England) Manchester City
18	(Belgium)	Franck Moussa	CM / RW / LW	2010	(England) Southend United
19	(England)	Richie Wellens	CM	2009	(England) Doncaster Rovers
22	(Japan)	Yuki Abe*	DM / RB	2010	(Japan) Urawa Red Diamonds
22	(England)	Ben Marshall	RW / LW / AM	2012	(England) Stoke City
23	(England)	Neil Danns	CM / RW	2011	(England) Crystal Palace
26	(Switzerland)	Gélson Fernandes*	DM	Loan	(France) Saint-Étienne
	(England)	Jason Banton*	LW	2011	Unattached
	(Republic of Ireland)	Shane Byrne	CM	2011	Youth
	(Portugal)	Moreno*	DM / CB	2010	(Portugal) Vitória de Guimarães
	(France)	Dany N'Guessan*	LW	2009	(England) Lincoln City
	(England)	Oliver Norburn	CM	2011	Youth
Forwards
7	(Scotland)	Paul Gallagher	AM / RW / CF	2009	(England) Blackburn Rovers
9	(Scotland)	Steve Howard	CF	2008	(England) Derby County
13	(England)	Darius Vassell	CF / RW	2010	Unattached
14	(England)	Martyn Waghorn	CF / RW	2010	(England) Sunderland
15	(England)	Harry Panayiotou	CF / AM	2012	Youth
20	(England)	Jermaine Beckford	CF	2011	(England) Everton
24	(England)	Nathan Delfouneso*	CF / RW	Loan	(England) Aston Villa
27	(Ghana)	Jeffrey Schlupp	CF / RW	2010	Youth
35	(England)	David Nugent	CF / RW	2011	Unattached
37	(England)	Tom Hopper	CF	2011	Youth
	(Wales)	Elliott Chamberlain	CF	2010	Youth
	(Slovenia)	Leon Crnčič*	CF	2010	(Italy) Atalanta
	(France)	Yann Kermorgant*	CF	2009	(France) Stade Reims

=== 2011–12 backroom staff ===
- This section lists members of staff who were in Leicester's first team squad at any point during the 2011–12 season
- Asterisks indicate member of staff left mid-season

Position	Nationality	Name
Manager (Until 24 October 2011)	(Sweden)	Sven-Göran Eriksson*
Manager (From 15 November 2011)	(England)	Nigel Pearson
Assistant manager (Until 24 October 2011)	(England)	Derek Fazackerley*
Assistant manager (From 15 November 2011)	(England)	Craig Shakespeare
Assistant manager/Head of Recruitment (From 15 November 2011)	(England)	Steve Walsh
First Team Coach/Goalkeeping Coach	(England)	Mike Stowell
Fitness Coach (Until 12 January 2012)	(England)	Chris Short
Head physio	(England)	David Rennie
Academy manager	(England)	Jon Rudkin
Academy coach (Under 18s)	(England)	Steve Beaglehole
Academy coach (Under 16s)	(England)	Trevor Peake

== Transfers ==
=== In ===
Date	Position	Nationality	Name	From	Fee
21 June 2011	RB	(England)	Lee Peltier	(England) Huddersfield Town	Undisclosed
27 June 2011	GK	(Denmark)	Kasper Schmeichel	(England) Leeds United	Undisclosed
1 July 2011	CM	(England)	Neil Danns	(England) Crystal Palace	Free
4 July 2011	CB	(Republic of Ireland)	Sean St Ledger	(England) Preston North End	Undisclosed
5 July 2011	CF	(England)	David Nugent	Free agent	Free
7 July 2011	CB	(England)	Matt Mills	(England) Reading	Undisclosed
12 July 2011	LW	(England)	Jason Banton	Free agent	Free
13 July 2011	LB	(England)	Paul Konchesky	(England) Liverpool	Undisclosed
21 July 2011	RB	(Ghana)	John Paintsil	Free agent	Free
6 August 2011	LB	(England)	Michael Ball	Free agent	Free
29 August 2011	DM	(England)	Callum Webb	Free agent	Free
29 August 2011	CB	(Northern Ireland)	Steven Smith	Free agent	Free
31 August 2011	CF	(England)	Jermaine Beckford	(England) Everton	Undisclosed
27 October 2011	GK	(United States)	Patrick Lane	Free agent	Free
20 January 2012	CM	(England)	Danny Drinkwater	(England) Manchester United	£1,000,000
30 January 2012	CB	(England)	Wes Morgan	(England) Nottingham Forest	£1,000,000
31 January 2012	RW	(England)	Ben Marshall	(England) Stoke City	£750,000–£1,000,000

=== Out ===
Date	Position	Nationality	Name	To	Fee
13 June 2011	RB	(Netherlands)	Michael Lamey	(Poland) Wisła Kraków	Free
30 June 2011	CB	(England)	Jack Hobbs	(England) Hull City	Undisclosed
31 August 2011	LW	(France)	Dany N'Guessan	(England) Millwall	Undisclosed
27 February 2012	GK	(United States)	Patrick Lane	(Sweden) Karlstad BK	Free

=== Loans in ===
Date from	Date to	Position	Nationality	Name	From
28 July 2011	End of Season	CM	(England)	Michael Johnson	(England) Manchester City
4 August 2011	4 January 2012	CM	(Switzerland)	Gélson Fernandes	(France) Saint-Étienne
23 January 2012	February 2012	CF	(England)	Nathan Delfouneso	(England) Aston Villa

=== Loans out ===
Date from	Date to	Position	Nationality	Name	To
11 July 2011	January 2012	CB	(Republic of Ireland)	Cian Bolger	(England) Bristol Rovers
12 July 2011	January 2012	GK	(Republic of Ireland)	Conrad Logan	(England) Rotherham United
28 July 2011	January 2012	CB	(England)	Tom Parkes	(England) Burton Albion
5 August 2011	December 2011	CB	(England)	Liam Moore	(England) Bradford City
5 August 2011	September 2011	CB	(Bulgaria)	Aleksandar Tunchev	(England) Crystal Palace
8 August 2011	January 2012	LW	(France)	Dany N'Guessan	(England) Millwall
16 August 2011	September 2011	CF	(Wales)	Elliott Chamberlain	(England) Stockport County
23 August 2011	October 2011	CB	(England)	George Taft	(England) Kettering Town
31 August 2011	January 2011	CM	(Republic of Ireland)	Shane Byrne	(England) Bury
31 August 2011	January 2012	CF	(England)	Martyn Waghorn	(England) Hull City
16 September 2011	October 2011	GK	(England)	Adam Smith	(England) Chesterfield
23 September 2011	January 2012	CM	(England)	Oliver Norburn	(England) Bristol Rovers
30 September 2011	October 2011	CM	(England)	Matt Oakley	(England) Exeter City
30 September 2011	October 2011	LB	(England)	Tom Kennedy	(England) Peterborough United
30 September 2011	October 2011	CF	(England)	Jason Banton	(England) Burton Albion
25 November 2011	January 2012	CF	(Wales)	Elliott Chamberlain	(England) Telford United
6 January 2012	19 January 2012	GK	(England)	Adam Smith	(England) Lincoln City
20 January 2012	February 2012	GK	(England)	Chris Weale	(England) Northampton Town
9 February 2012	March 2012	CB	(England)	Tom Parkes	(England) Bristol Rovers
10 February 2012	22 February 2012	GK	(United States)	Patrick Lane	(England) Hinckley United
25 March 2012	July 2012	CB	(England)	George Taft	(Sweden) Karlstad BK

=== Released ===
Date	Position	Nationality	Name
30 June 2011	CM	(England)	Aman Verma
30 June 2011	GK	(Hungary)	Robert Ambrusics
30 June 2011	CF	(England)	Ashley Chambers
30 June 2011	CM	(England)	Nathan Hicks
30 June 2011	RW	(England)	Jorrin John
30 June 2011	CF	(Scotland)	Craig King
30 June 2011	CM	(England)	Ben Milnes
30 June 2011	RB	(England)	Luke O'Neill
30 June 2011	CF	(Tanzania)	Adi Yussuf
30 June 2011	GK	(Portugal)	Ricardo
18 July 2011	RB	(Scotland)	Robbie Neilson
30 August 2011	CF	(Slovenia)	Leon Črnčič
5 September 2011	CF	(France)	Yann Kermorgant
22 December 2011	LW	(England)	Jason Banton
13 January 2012	DM	(Portugal)	Moreno
23 January 2012	DM	(Japan)	Yuki Abe
23 January 2012	LB	(England)	Michael Ball

== Results ==
Win Draw Loss Upcoming fixture

=== Football League Championship ===
6 August 2011 1	Coventry City	0–1	Leicester City	Coventry
12:30 BST	Baker (red card) 38'; Hussey (yellow card) 65'; O'Donovan (yellow card) 90+3'	Report	Vassell (red card) 11'; Peltier 52'; Wellens (yellow card) 80'; Gallagher (yellow card) 82'; Fernandes (yellow card) 90+2'; Mills (yellow card) 90+3'	Stadium: Ricoh Arena; Attendance: 21,102; Referee: Darren Deadman

13 August 2011 2	Leicester City	0–2	Reading	Leicester
15:00 BST		Report	Manset (yellow card) 53'; Hunt 64'; Robson-Kanu 90'	Stadium: King Power Stadium; Attendance: 23,399; Referee: K Stroud

18 August 2011 3	Leicester City	1–2	Bristol City	Leicester
15:00 BST	Fernandes (yellow card) 23'; Bamba (yellow card) 45+1'; Nugent 56'; Gallagher (yellow card) 76'	Report	Maynard 5', 66'; Skuse (yellow card) 43'; Wilson (yellow card) 45+2'; Nyatanga (yellow card) 76'	Stadium: King Power Stadium; Attendance: 20,794; Referee: N Miller

20 August 2011 4	Nottingham Forest	2–2	Leicester City	Nottingham
15:00 BST	McGugan 79' (pen.); Boateng 90+4'	Report	Nugent 18'; Fernandes 21'; Wellens (yellow card) 51'; Mills (yellow card) 78'; Schmeichel (yellow card) 78' (yellow-red card) 79'	Stadium: City Ground; Attendance: 24,426; Referee: Jonathan Moss

27 August 2011 5	Leicester City	3–2	Southampton	Leicester
15:00 BST	Vassell 3' (yellow card) 90'; Wellens 22'; Lambert 45+3' (o.g.); Danns (yellow card) 79'	Report	Harding 28'; Seaborne (yellow card) 49'; Connolly 53'	Stadium: King Power Stadium; Attendance: 23,808; Referee: S Mathieson

10 September 2011 6	Barnsley	1–1	Leicester City	Barnsley
15:00 BST	Butterfield 38'; Foster (yellow card) 86'; Perkins (yellow card) 89'; Drinkwater (yellow card) 90+4'	Report	King 46'; Danns (yellow card) 89'; Vassell (yellow card) 89'	Stadium: Oakwell; Attendance: 10,862; Referee: David Webb

17 September 2011 7	Leicester City	1–0	Brighton & Hove Albion	Leicester
15:00 BST	Fernandes (yellow card) 11'; Abe 46'; Mills (yellow card) 58'; Vassell (yellow card) 88'; King (yellow card) 90+2'	Report	Painter (yellow card) 44'; Dunk (yellow card) 49'; Dicker (yellow card) 54' (yellow-red card) 80'; LuaLua (yellow card) 90'	Stadium: King Power Stadium; Attendance: 24,128; Referee: Graham Scott

25 September 2011 8	Cardiff City	0–0	Leicester City	Cardiff
15:00 BST	Cowie (yellow card) 75'	Report	Konchesky (yellow card) 77'; Bamba (yellow card) 82'; Wellens (yellow card) 90+2'	Stadium: Cardiff City Stadium; Attendance: 21,154; Referee: Mark Haywood

28 September 2011 9	Middlesbrough	0–0	Leicester City	Middlesbrough
15:00 BST	Bates (yellow card) 55'; Haroun (yellow card) 64'; Thomson (yellow card) 90+1'	Report	Mills (yellow card) 68'	Stadium: Riverside Stadium; Attendance: 16,883; Referee: A Bates

1 October 2011 10	Leicester City	4–0	Derby County	Leicester
17:20 BST	Nugent 21'; Vassell 44'; Bamba (yellow card) 48'; Schlupp 88'; Dyer 90+1'	Report	Hendrick (yellow card) 56'; Shackell (yellow card) 90+4'	Stadium: King Power Stadium; Attendance: 22,496; Referee: Howard Webb

16 October 2011 11	Birmingham City	2–0	Leicester City	Birmingham
13:00 BST	Beausejour (yellow card) 33'; King 50'; Wood 84'	Report	Mills (red card) 55'	Stadium: St. Andrew's; Attendance: 17,102; Referee: Graham Salisbury (Kevin Wright replaced Salisbury at half-time due to injury)

19 October 2011 12	Leicester City	2–0	Watford	Leicester
19:45 BST	Nugent 19'; Beckford 36'; King (yellow card) 64'	Report	Mariappa (yellow card) 45+3'	Stadium: King Power Stadium; Attendance: 20,304; Referee: Chris Sarginson

23 October 2011 13	Leicester City	0–3	Millwall	Leicester
15:00 BST	Bamba (yellow card) 35'; Nugent (yellow card) 78'	Report	Henderson 36' (pen.), 45+3', 68'; Robinson (yellow card) 73'	Stadium: King Power Stadium; Attendance: 21,991; Referee: Eddie Ilderton

29 October 2011 14	West Ham United	3–2	Leicester City	London
15:00 BST	Carew (yellow card) 19'; Baldock 21', 71'; Faubert 22'; O'Brien (yellow card) 40'; Faye (yellow card) 62'	Report	Konchesky (yellow card) 29'; King 58', 74'; Wellens (yellow card) 62'	Stadium: Boleyn Ground; Attendance: 30,410; Referee: James Linington

1 November 2011 15	Burnley	1–3	Leicester City	Burnley
19:45 GMT	Wallace 23'	Report	Konchesky 20'; Nugent 54'; Gallagher 62' (pen.)	Stadium: Turf Moor; Attendance: 13,286; Referee: Geoff Eltringham

6 November 2011 16	Leicester City	0–1	Leeds United	Leicester
15:00 GMT	Konchesky (yellow card) 45+2'; Danns (yellow card) 61'; Bamba (yellow card) 78'; Beckford (yellow card) 90+4'	Report	Snodgrass (yellow card) 55'; Clayton 69'; Connolly (yellow card) 79'	Stadium: King Power Stadium; Attendance: 26,720; Referee: Oliver Langford

20 November 2011 17	Leicester City	3–0	Crystal Palace	Leicester
15:00 GMT	Beckford 55'; Gallagher 71', 74'	Report		Stadium: King Power Stadium; Attendance: 22.449; Referee: Mark Brown

26 November 2011 18	Portsmouth	1–1	Leicester City	Portsmouth
15:00 GMT	Norris (yellow card) 56', (goal) 68'; Halford (yellow card) 90+2'	Report	Nugent 74'	Stadium: Fratton Park; Attendance: 14,391; Referee: Phil Gibbs

29 November 2011 19	Leicester City	2–0	Blackpool	Leicester
19:45 GMT	King 35'; Danns 82'	Report	Evatt (yellow card) 74'	Stadium: King Power Stadium; Attendance: 21,578; Referee: Graham Scott

3 December 2011 20	Hull City	2–1	Leicester City	Kingston upon Hull
15:00 GMT	Dawson (yellow card) 25'; Fryatt 30' (pen.); Koren 88'	Report	Mills (red card) 29'; Konchesky 40'	Stadium: KC Stadium; Attendance: 20,148; Referee: Simon Hooper

10 December 2011 21	Leicester City	1–1	Peterborough United	Leicester
15:00 GMT	Konchesky (yellow card) 42'; Gallagher 56'; Nugent (yellow card) 62'; Bamba (yellow card) 73'	Report	Tomlin 71'	Stadium: King Power Stadium; Attendance: 25,948; Referee: Anthony Taylor

17 December 2011 22	Doncaster Rovers	2–1	Leicester City	Doncaster
15:00 GMT	Sharp 63', 65'	Report	Nugent 38'; Howard (yellow card) 73'	Stadium: Keepmoat Stadium; Attendance: 9,461; Referee: Darren Sheldrake

26 December 2011 23	Leicester City	1–1	Ipswich Town	Leicester
15:00 GMT	Gallagher 69' (pen.), (yellow card) 81'	Report	Bowyer 4'; Sonko (yellow card) 8'; Martin (yellow card) 38'	Stadium: King Power Stadium; Attendance: 27,091; Referee: Darren Drysdale

31 December 2011 24	Leicester City	1–1	Portsmouth	Leicester
12:15 GMT	Nugent 24'; Danns (yellow card) 82'	Report	Futács 20'; Mokoena (yellow card) 33'; Lawrence (yellow card) 61'; Halford (yellow card) 62'; Ward (yellow card) 83'	Stadium: King Power Stadium; Attendance: 25,356; Referee: Colin Webster

2 January 2012 25	Crystal Palace	1–2	Leicester City	London
13:00 GMT	Parr 41'	Report	Danns 19'; Bamba 37', (yellow card) 83'; Howard (red card) 87'	Stadium: Selhurst Park; Attendance: 14,468; Referee: James Linington

14 January 2012 26	Leicester City	1–2	Barnsley	Leicester
15:00 GMT	Dyer 15'; Nugent (yellow card) 40'; Peltier (yellow card) 71'; Mills (yellow card) 72'	Report	Gray 12', 34'; Addison (yellow card) 41'; Vaz Tê (yellow card) 75'	Stadium: King Power Stadium; Attendance: 22,116; Referee: D Whitestone

23 January 2012 27	Southampton	0–2	Leicester City	Southampton
19:45 GMT		Report	Nugent 15', (yellow card) 74'; Mills 26'; Konchesky (yellow card) 69'	Stadium: St Mary's Stadium; Attendance: 21,014; Referee: Neil Swarbrick

1 February 2012 28	Leicester City	2–2	Middlesbrough	Leicester
19:45 GMT	Nugent 7', (yellow card) 33'; St Ledger (yellow card) 78'; Konchesky (yellow card) 83'; Beckford 86'; Danns (yellow card) 90+1'	Report	McDonald 17'; McMahon 79'	Stadium: King Power Stadium; Attendance: 20,512; Referee: Gavin Ward

4 February 2012 29	Brighton & Hove Albion	1–0	Leicester City	Brighton
15:00 GMT	Greer (yellow card) 74'; Calderón (yellow card) 79'; Sparrow (red card) 85'; Bridcutt (yellow card) 88'; Buckley 90'	Report	Beckford (red card) 53'; Danns (yellow card) 50' (yellow-red card) 90+4'	Stadium: Amex Stadium; Attendance: 20,223; Referee: Andy Woolmer

11 February 2012 30	Leicester City	2–1	Cardiff City	Leicester
15:00 GMT	Gallagher 41' (pen.), 71'	Report	Kiss (yellow card) 45+2'; Whittingham 77' (pen.); Cowie (yellow card) 70'	Stadium: King Power Stadium; Attendance: 21,375; Referee: Mark Halsey

14 February 2012 31	Watford	3–2	Leicester City	Watford
19:45 GMT	Mariappa 5'; Garner (yellow card) 14'; Murray 33'; Forsyth 80'; Doyley (red card) 90+2'	Report	Nugent 11', 18'; Mills (yellow card) 32'; Konchesky (yellow card) 62'	Stadium: Vicarage Road; Attendance: 11,800; Referee: David Webb

23 February 2012 32	Derby County	0–1	Leicester City	Derby
19:45 GMT	Ward (yellow card) 14'	Report	Danns 16', (yellow card) 65'; Morgan (yellow card) 68'	Stadium: Pride Park Stadium; Attendance: 28,205; Referee: Simon Hooper

3 March 2012 33	Leicester City	2–0	Coventry City	Leicester
15:00 GMT	Nugent 11'; Morgan (yellow card) 46'; Beckford 60'; Konchesky (red card) 83'	Report	Nimely (yellow card) 34'	Stadium: King Power Stadium; Attendance: 25,487; Referee: Lee Probert

6 March 2012 34	Bristol City	3–2	Leicester City	Bristol
19:45 GMT	Stead (yellow card) 11', (goal) 79'; Cissé 45+1'; Pitman 54'; McAllister (yellow card) 82'	Report	Wellens (yellow card) 9'; Dyer 41'; Danns 77'	Stadium: Ashton Gate; Attendance: 12,033; Referee: Mark Haywood

10 March 2012 35	Reading	3–1	Leicester City	Reading
15:00 GMT	Leigertwood 15', (yellow card) 62'; Roberts 75'; Church 89'	Report	Howard (yellow card) 72'; Danns 90+2'	Stadium: Madejski Stadium; Attendance: 21,858; Referee: Bobby Madley

14 March 2012 36	Leicester City	3–1	Birmingham City	Leicester
19:45 GMT	Beckford 34', 90+5'; St Ledger (yellow card) 40'; Kennedy (yellow card) 70'; Schlupp 80'	Report	Elliott 20' (pen.); Davies (yellow card) 55'; Caldwell (yellow card) 71'	Stadium: King Power Stadium; Attendance: 21,092; Referee: Mick Russell

21 March 2012 37	Blackpool	3–3	Leicester City	Blackpool
20:00 GMT	K. Phillips 33', 90+1'; Evatt (yellow card) 45'; M. Phillps (yellow card) 62'; Bednář 69'	Report	Nugent (yellow card) 27', (goal) 54'; Beckford 38', 73'; Konchesky (yellow card) 72'	Stadium: Bloomfield Road; Attendance: 12,485; Referee: Michael Naylor

24 March 2012 38	Leicester City	2–1	Hull City	Leicester
15:00 GMT	Dyer 18'; Marshall 19'; Danns (red card) 57'	Report	Fryatt 8'	Stadium: King Power Stadium; Attendance: 23,759; Referee: Nigel Miller

27 March 2012 39	Leicester City	0–0	Nottingham Forest	Leicester
19:45 BST	Drinkwater (yellow card) 45'	Report	Wooton (yellow card) 36'	Stadium: King Power Stadium; Attendance: 23,412; Referee: Scott Mathieson

31 March 2012 40	Peterborough United	1–0	Leicester City	Peterborough
15:00 BST	Taylor 60'; Alcock (yellow card) 78'	Report	Schmeichel (yellow card) 62'; Nugent (yellow card) 79'	Stadium: London Road; Attendance: 10,714; Referee: Michael Oliver

7 April 2012 41	Leicester City	4–0	Doncaster Rovers	Leicester
15:00 BST	Drinkwater 33'; Peltier 47'; Marshall 78'; Gallagher 88'	Report	Chimbonda (yellow card) 75'	Stadium: King Power Stadium; Attendance: 22,054; Referee: Roger East

9 April 2012 42	Ipswich Town	1–2	Leicester City	Ipswich
15:00 BST	Scotland 43'	Report	Marshall 45+2'; King (yellow card) 55'; Nugent 58'	Stadium: Portman Road; Attendance: 18,282; Referee: Tony Bates

14 April 2012 43	Millwall	2–1	Leicester City	London
15:00 BST	Kane 23'; Keogh 55' (pen.); Lowry (yellow card) 63'	Report	Konchesky (yellow card) 55'; Peltier (yellow card) 65'; Drinkwater 82'	Stadium: The Den; Attendance: 11,525; Referee: Phil Gibbs

17 April 2012 44	Leicester City	0–0	Burnley	Leicester
19:45 BST		Report	Marney (yellow card) 83'	Stadium: King Power Stadium; Attendance: 19,806; Referee: Mike Jones

23 April 2012 45	Leicester City	1–2	West Ham United	Leicester
19:45 BST	Beckford 34'	Report	O'Neil (yellow card) 30'; Reid 39'; Collison 58'	Stadium: King Power Stadium; Attendance: 23,172; Referee: Eddie Ilderton

28 April 2012 46	Leeds United	1–2	Leicester City	Leeds
12:30 BST	Pugh (yellow card) 24'; Brown (yellow card) 34'; Webber 82'	Report	St Ledger (yellow card) 22'; Waghorn 39'; Panayiotou 90+4'	Stadium: Elland Road; Attendance: 25,644; Referee: Danny McDermid

=== FA Cup ===
7 January 2012 3rd round	Nottingham Forest	0–0	Leicester City	Nottingham
15:00 GMT		Report	Danns (yellow card) 34'; Mills (yellow card) 84'	Stadium: City Ground; Attendance: 18,477; Referee: Geoff Eltringham

17 January 2012 3rd round replay	Leicester City	4–0	Nottingham Forest	Leicester
19:30 GMT	Boateng 7' (o.g.); Beckford 30', 50', 57'	Report	Reid (yellow card) 60'	Stadium: King Power Stadium; Attendance: 16,210; Referee: Craig Pawson

28 January 2012 4th round	Leicester City	2–0	Swindon Town	Leicester
15:00 GMT	Beckford 5', 53'; Konchesky (yellow card) 45+2'	Report		Stadium: King Power Stadium; Attendance: 19,942; Referee: Darren Drysdale

18 February 2012 5th round	Norwich City	1–2	Leicester City	Norwich
15:00 GMT	Ward (yellow card) 17'; Hoolahan 23'	Report	St Ledger 5'; Morgan (yellow card) 37'; Nugent 71'	Stadium: Carrow Road; Attendance: 26,658; Referee: Mike Dean

18 March 2012 6th round	Chelsea	5–2	Leicester City	London
14:05 GMT	Cahill 12'; Kalou 17'; Torres 67', 85'; Meireles 90+1'	Report	Beckford 77'; Marshall 88'	Stadium: Stamford Bridge; Attendance: 38,276; Referee: Lee Probert

=== Football League Cup ===
9 August 2011 1st round	Rotherham United	1–4	Leicester City	Rotherham
19:45 BST	Mills 13' (o.g.); Marshall (yellow card) 42'	Report	Gallagher 36', (yellow card) 37'; Schlupp 53', 63', 71'	Stadium: Don Valley Stadium; Attendance: 3,717; Referee: Steve Rushton

23 August 2011 2nd round	Bury	2–4	Leicester City	Bury
19:45 BST	Jones 40'; Lowe 53'; Sodje (yellow card) 68'	Report	Schlupp 21'; Oakley (yellow card) 24'; Gallagher 70'; Dyer 77'; Danns 90'	Stadium: Gigg Lane; Attendance: 3,779; Referee: A Haines

21 September 2011 3rd round	Cardiff City	2–2 (a.e.t.) (7–6 p)	Leicester City	Cardiff
19:45 BST	Cowie 34'; Keinan (yellow card) 73'; Gestede 82'; Quinn (yellow card) 117'	Report	Howard 40'; Dyer 67', (yellow card) 78'; St Ledger (yellow card) 81'	Stadium: Cardiff City Stadium; Attendance: 8,697; Referee: Roger East
	Penalties
	Naylor (penalty scored); Earnshaw (penalty scored); Cowie (penalty scored); Conway (penalty scored); Kiss (penalty scored); Gestede (penalty scored); Quinn (penalty scored)		Dyer (penalty scored); Howard (penalty scored); Abe (penalty scored); Danns (penalty scored); St Ledger (penalty scored); Paintsil (penalty scored); Fernandes (penalty missed)

== Awards ==
=== Club awards ===
At the end of the season, Leicester's annual award ceremony, including categories voted for by the players and backroom staff, the supporters and the supporters club, saw the following players recognised for their achievements for the club throughout the 2011–12 season.

Player of the Season Award	(Denmark) Kasper Schmeichel
Young Player of the Season Award	(England) Ben Marshall
Players' Player of the Season Award	(Denmark) Kasper Schmeichel
Supporters' Club Player of the Season Award	(Denmark) Kasper Schmeichel
Academy Player of the Season Award	(England) Tom Hopper
Goal of the Season Award	(England) Ben Marshall (vs. Chelsea, 18 March 2012)
Performance of the Season	Leicester City vs. Norwich City, 18 February 2012

=== Divisional awards ===
Date	Nation	Winner	Award
8 August 2011	(Denmark)	Kasper Schmeichel	Championship Team of the Week
19 September 2011	(Denmark)	Kasper Schmeichel	Championship Team of the Week
31 October 2011	(Wales)	Andy King	Championship Team of the Week
21 November 2011	(England)	Matt Mills	Championship Team of the Week
21 November 2011	(Scotland)	Paul Gallagher	Championship Team of the Week
13 February 2012	(Scotland)	Paul Gallagher	Championship Team of the Week
27 February 2012	(England)	Neil Danns	Championship Team of the Week
27 February 2012	(England)	Lloyd Dyer	Championship Team of the Week
5 March 2012	(England)	Lee Peltier	Championship Team of the Week
26 March 2012	(England)	Ben Marshall	Championship Team of the Week
10 April 2012	(England)	Paul Konchesky	Championship Team of the Week
28 April 2012	(England)	Paul Konchesky	Championship Team of the Week

== Championship statistics ==
=== Championship table ===
Pos	Team	Pld	W	D	L	GF	GA	GD	Pts
7	Middlesbrough	46	18	16	12	52	51	+1	70
8	Hull City	46	19	11	16	47	44	+3	68
9	Leicester City	46	18	12	16	66	55	+11	66
10	Brighton & Hove Albion	46	17	15	14	52	52	0	66
11	Watford	46	16	16	14	56	64	−8	64

Updated to match(es) played on 28 April 2012. Source: BBC Sport
Rules for classification: 1) points; 2) goal difference; 3) number of goals scored.

=== Club standings ===
Overall								Home						Away					
Pld	W	D	L	GF	GA	GD	Pts	W	D	L	GF	GA	GD	W	D	L	GF	GA	GD
46	18	12	16	66	55	+11	66	11	6	6	36	22	+14	7	6	10	30	33	−3

Last updated: 28 April 2012.
Source: LCFC Championship Results

==== Results by round ====
Round	1	2	3	4	5	6	7	8	9	10	11	12	13	14	15	16	17	18	19	20	21	22	23	24	25	26	27	28	29	30	31	32	33	34	35	36	37	38	39	40	41	42	43	44	45	46
Ground	A	H	H	A	H	A	H	A	A	H	A	H	H	A	A	H	H	A	H	A	H	A	H	H	A	H	A	H	A	H	A	A	H	A	A	H	A	H	H	A	H	A	A	H	H	A
Result	W	L	L	D	W	D	W	D	D	W	L	W	L	L	W	L	W	D	W	L	D	L	D	D	W	L	W	D	L	W	L	W	W	L	L	W	D	W	D	L	W	W	L	D	L	W
Position	2	15	17	14	10	10	9	9	11	8	13	9	13	14	8	12	8	9	6	9	9	10	12	13	10	15	13	13	13	12	12	12	11	11	12	11	12	11	11	12	9	9	9	10	10	9

Updated to match(es) played on 28 April 2012. Source: Football League Championship matches
A = Away; H = Home; W = Win; D = Draw; L = Loss

=== Scores by club ===
Leicester City score given first.

Opposition	Home score	Away score	Double
Barnsley	1–2	1–1	
Birmingham City	3–1	0–2	
Blackpool	2–0	3–3	
Bristol City	1–2	2–3	Bristol City do double
Burnley	1–1	3–1	
Brighton & Hove Albion	1–0	0–1	
Cardiff City	2–1	0–0	
Coventry City	2–0	1–0	Leicester City do double
Crystal Palace	3–0	2–1	Leicester City do double
Derby County	4–0	1–0	Leicester City do double
Doncaster Rovers	4–0	1–2	
Hull City	2–1	1–2	
Ipswich Town	1–1	2–1	
Leeds United	0–1	2–1	
Middlesbrough	2–2	0–0	
Millwall	0–3	1–2	Millwall do double
Nottingham Forest	0–0	2–2	
Peterborough United	1–1	0–1	
Portsmouth	1–1	1–1	
Reading	0–2	1–3	Reading do double
Southampton	3–2	2–0	Leicester City do double
Watford	2–0	2–3	
West Ham United	1–2	2–3	West Ham United do double

== Club statistics ==
All data from LCFC.com

=== Appearances ===
- Starts + Substitute appearances.
- Italics indicates loan player.
- Asterisks indicates player left mid-season.
- Hash symbol indicates player retired mid-season.

No.	Pos	Nat	Player	Total		Championship		FA Cup		League Cup	
No.	Pos	Nat	Player	Apps	Goals	Apps	Goals	Apps	Goals	Apps	Goals
1	GK	(Denmark) DEN	Kasper Schmeichel	52	0	46	0	5	0	1	0
2	DF	(England) ENG	Lee Peltier	47	2	39+1	2	4+1	0	1+1	0
3	DF	(England) ENG	Paul Konchesky	48	2	42	2	4+1	0	1	0
4	DF	(Ghana) GHA	John Paintsil	7	0	4+2	0	0	0	1	0
5	DF	(England) ENG	Matt Mills	31	1	25	1	3	0	3	0
6	DF	(Ivory Coast) CIV	Sol Bamba	37	1	32+4	1	1	0	0	0
7	FW	(Scotland) SCO	Paul Gallagher	34	10	18+10	8	4	0	2	2
8	MF	(England) ENG	Matt Oakley*	2	0	0	0	0	0	2	0
9	FW	(Scotland) SCO	Steve Howard	23	1	3+17	0	0+2	0	1	1
10	MF	(Wales) WAL	Andy King	32	4	24+6	4	1	0	0+1	0
11	MF	(England) ENG	Lloyd Dyer	44	6	27+9	4	4+1	0	3	2
12	DF	(Republic of Ireland) IRL	Sean St Ledger	32	1	23+3	0	4	1	2	0
13	FW	(England) ENG	Darius Vassell	13	2	10+3	2	0	0	0	0
14	FW	(England) ENG	Martyn Waghorn	5	1	1+3	1	0	0	1	0
15	DF	(Switzerland) SUI	Bruno Berner#	0	0	0	0	0	0	0	0
15	FW	(England) ENG	Harry Panayiotou	1	1	0+1	1	0	0	0	0
16	DF	(England) ENG	Michael Ball*	3	0	0	0	0	0	3	0
16	MF	(England) ENG	Danny Drinkwater	19	2	13+6	2	0	0	0	0
17	MF	(England) ENG	Michael Johnson*	9	0	3+4	0	0	0	2	0
18	MF	(Belgium) BEL	Franck Moussa	3	0	0	0	0	0	3	0
19	MF	(England) ENG	Richie Wellens	46	1	39+2	1	4+1	0	0	0
20	FW	(England) ENG	Jermaine Beckford	44	15	33+6	9	4+1	6	0	0
21	GK	(England) ENG	Chris Weale	3	0	0+1	0	0	0	2	0
22	MF	(Japan) JPN	Yuki Abe*	19	1	13+3	1	1	0	1+1	0
22	MF	(England) ENG	Ben Marshall	18	4	12+4	3	1+1	1	0	0
23	MF	(England) ENG	Neil Danns	37	6	22+7	5	5+0	0	1+2	1
24	FW	(England) ENG	Nathan Delfouneso*	5	0	0+4	0	0+1	0	0	0
25	GK	(Republic of Ireland) IRL	Conrad Logan	0	0	0	0	0	0	0	0
26	MF	(Switzerland) SUI	Gélson Fernandes*	18	1	10+5	1	0	0	0+3	0
26	DF	(England) ENG	Wes Morgan	19	0	15+2	0	2	0	0	0
27	FW	(Ghana) GHA	Jeffrey Schlupp	26	6	3+18	2	1+1	0	3	4
30	DF	(England) ENG	Tom Kennedy	8	0	4+1	0	1+2	0	0	0
31	GK	(England) ENG	Adam Smith	0	0	0	0	0	0	0	0
32	DF	(England) ENG	Tom Parkes	0	0	0	0	0	0	0	0
33	DF	(Bulgaria) BUL	Aleksander Tunchev	3	0	2	0	1	0	0	0
34	DF	(England) ENG	Liam Moore	2	0	2	0	0	0	0	0
35	FW	(England) ENG	David Nugent	48	16	41+1	15	5	1	0+1	0
36	DF	(England) ENG	George Taft	0	0	0	0	0	0	0	0
37	FW	(England) ENG	Tom Hopper	1	0	0	0	0+1	0	0	0

=== Top scorers ===
Pos.	Nat.	Name	League	FA Cup	League Cup	Total
1	(England)	David Nugent	15	1	0	16
2	(England)	Jermaine Beckford	9	6	0	15
3	(Scotland)	Paul Gallagher	8	0	2	10
4	(England)	Neil Danns	5	0	1	6
=	(England)	Lloyd Dyer	4	0	2	6
=	(Ghana)	Jeffrey Schlupp	2	0	4	6
7	(Wales)	Andy King	4	0	0	4
=	(England)	Ben Marshall	3	1	0	4
9	(England)	Danny Drinkwater	2	0	0	2
=	(England)	Paul Konchesky	2	0	0	2
=	(England)	Lee Peltier	2	0	0	2
=	(England)	Darius Vassell	2	0	0	2
13	(Japan)	Yuki Abe	1	0	0	1
=	(Ivory Coast)	Sol Bamba	1	0	0	1
=	(Switzerland)	Gélson Fernandes	1	0	0	1
=	(England)	Matt Mills	1	0	0	1
=	(England)	Harry Panayiotou	1	0	0	1
=	(England)	Martyn Waghorn	1	0	0	1
=	(England)	Richie Wellens	1	0	0	1
=	(Republic of Ireland)	Sean St Ledger	0	1	0	1
=	(Scotland)	Steve Howard	0	0	1	1
Own goals			1	1	0	2
Total			66	10	10	86

=== Most assists ===
Pos.	Nat.	Name	League	FA Cup	League Cup	Total
1	(England)	David Nugent	8	1	0	9
2	(Scotland)	Paul Gallagher	3	2	3	8
3	(England)	Richie Wellens	5	0	0	5
4	(England)	Jermaine Beckford	3	1	0	4
=	(England)	Ben Marshall	3	1	0	4
=	(England)	Neil Danns	2	1	1	4
7	(Scotland)	Steve Howard	3	0	0	3
=	(Republic of Ireland)	Sean St Ledger	3	0	0	3
=	(England)	Matt Mills	2	1	0	3
10	(England)	Danny Drinkwater	2	0	0	2
=	(England)	Lloyd Dyer	2	0	0	2
=	(Switzerland)	Gélson Fernandes	2	0	0	2
=	(England)	Tom Kennedy	2	0	0	2
=	(England)	Lee Peltier	2	0	0	2
=	(Wales)	Andy King	1	0	1	2
=	(Ghana)	Jeffrey Schlupp	1	0	1	2
13	(Japan)	Yuki Abe	1	0	0	1
=	(England)	Paul Konchesky	1	0	0	1
=	(England)	Darius Vassell	1	0	0	1
=	(England)	Martyn Waghorn	0	0	1	1

=== Disciplinary record ===
Nation	Name	Yellow card	Red card
(England)	Neil Danns	8	2
(England)	Matt Mills	7	2
(England)	Paul Konchesky	11	1
(England)	Darius Vassell	3	1
(Scotland)	Steve Howard	2	1
(Denmark)	Kasper Schmeichel	2	1
(England)	Jermaine Beckford	1	1
(Ivory Coast)	Sol Bamba	7	0
(England)	David Nugent	7	0
(England)	Richie Wellens	5	0
(Scotland)	Paul Gallagher	4	0
(Republic of Ireland)	Sean St Ledger	4	0
(Switzerland)	Gélson Fernandes	3	0
(Wales)	Andy King	3	0
(England)	Wes Morgan	3	0
(England)	Lee Peltier	2	0
(England)	Danny Drinkwater	1	0
(England)	Lloyd Dyer	1	0
(England)	Tom Kennedy	1	0
(England)	Matt Oakley	1	0
Totals		75	9

=== Captains ===
- Only counts starts as captain

No.	Position	Nation	Name	Starts
5	CB	(England)	Matt Mills	31
19	CM	(England)	Richie Wellens	19
1	GK	(Denmark)	Kasper Schmeichel	3
23	CM	(England)	Neil Danns	1

=== Suspensions ===
Date Incurred	Nation	Name	Games Missed	Reason
6 August 2011	(England)	Darius Vassell	3	(red card) (vs. Coventry City)
20 August 2011	(Denmark)	Kasper Schmeichel	1	(yellow card) (yellow-red card) (vs. Nottingham Forest)
16 October 2011	(England)	Matt Mills	3	(red card) (vs. Birmingham City)
6 November 2011	(Ivory Coast)	Sol Bamba	1	Yellow card
3 December 2011	(England)	Matt Mills	2	(red card) (vs. Hull City)
2 January 2012	(Scotland)	Steve Howard	2	(red card) (vs. Crystal Palace)
4 February 2012	(England)	Neil Danns	1	(yellow card) (yellow-red card) (vs. Brighton & Hove Albion)
3 March 2012	(England)	Paul Konchesky	3	(red card) (vs. Coventry City)
24 March 2011	(England)	Neil Danns	4	(red card) (vs. Hull City)

=== Penalties ===
Date	Nation	Name	Opposition	Scored?
1 November 2011	(Scotland)	Paul Gallagher	Burnley	✓
26 December 2011	(Scotland)	Paul Gallagher	Ipswich Town	✓
11 February 2012	(Scotland)	Paul Gallagher	Cardiff City	✓
3 March 2012	(England)	Neil Danns	Coventry City	✗

=== Overall seasonal record ===
Note: Games which are level after extra-time and are decided by a penalty shoot-out are listed as draws.

Games played	54 (46 Championship, 5 FA Cup, 3 League Cup)
Games won	23 (18 Championship, 3 FA Cup, 2 League Cup)
Games drawn	14 (12 Championship, 1 FA Cup, 1 League Cup)
Games lost	17 (16 Championship, 1 FA Cup, 0 League Cup)
Win %	42.59%
Goals scored	86 (66 Championship, 10 FA Cup, 10 League Cup)
Goals conceded	66 (55 Championship, 6 FA Cup, 5 League Cup)
Goal difference	+20 (+11 Championship, +4 FA Cup, +5 League Cup)
Yellow cards	77 (69 Championship, 4 FA Cup, 4 League Cup)
Red cards	9 (9 Championship, 0 FA Cup, 0 League Cup)
Worst discipline	Neil Danns (8 yellows, 2 reds)
Biggest win	4–0 vs. Derby County (Championship, 1 October 2011) & vs. Nottingham Forest (FA Cup, 17 January 2012) & vs. Doncaster Rovers (Championship 7 April 2012)
Heaviest defeat	0–3 vs. Millwall (Championship, 23 October 2011) & 2–5 vs. Chelsea (FA Cup, 18 March 2012)
Highest scoring match	2–5 vs. Chelsea (FA Cup, 18 March 2012)
Most appearances	52 (Kasper Schmeichel)
Top scorer	16 (David Nugent)
Most assists	9 (David Nugent)
