= Chris Weale =

English footballer (born 1982)

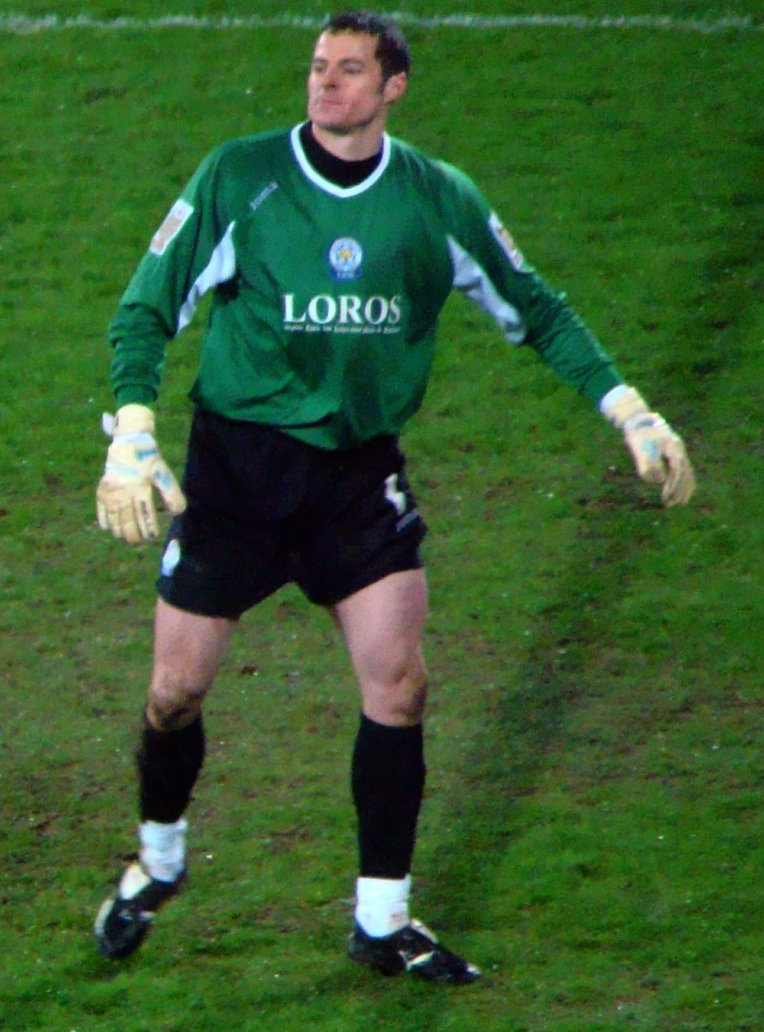
- Weale playing for Leicester City in 2010

Personal information
- Full name: Christopher Weale
- Date of birth: 9 February 1982 (age 44)
- Place of birth: Yeovil, England
- Height: 6 ft 2 in (1.88 m)
- Position: Goalkeeper

Youth career
- Gillingham Town
- 1999–2000: Yeovil Town

Senior career*
Years	Team	Apps	(Gls)
2000–2006	Yeovil Town	163	(0)
2006–2009	Bristol City	9	(0)
2007	→ Hereford United (loan)	1	(0)
2008	→ Hereford United (loan)	1	(0)
2009	→ Yeovil Town (loan)	10	(1)
2009–2012	Leicester City	75	(0)
2012	→ Northampton Town (loan)	3	(0)
2012–2014	Shrewsbury Town	81	(0)
2014–2016	Yeovil Town	17	(0)
2014	→ Burton Albion (loan)	0	(0)
2016–2017	Derby County	0	(0)
2017–2018	Dorchester Town	45	(0)
2018–2019	Exeter City	0	(0)
Total		405	(1)

International career
2003	England C	4	(0)

Managerial career
- 2015–2016: Yeovil Town (Goalkeeper coach)
- 2018–2019: Exeter City (Goalkeeper coach)
- * Club domestic league appearances and goals

Christopher Weale (born 9 February 1982) is an English former professional footballer who played as a goalkeeper. He is currently Director of Football Coaching at Sherborne School.

== Career ==
=== Yeovil Town ===
Born in Yeovil, Somerset, Weale was a product of Yeovil Town's youth system after joining Yeovil in August 1999 from local side Gillingham Town. Weale was first choice keeper for the Youth Team that won the South-West Counties Under 18s League title in 2000 and during the same season he broke into the Reserve side.

Weale made his first team debut in July 2000 having come on as a substitute against Southampton in Tony Pennock's testimonial game before making his first full competitive debut against Wellington in the Somerset Premier Cup in October of that year. Weale began to gain more experience in the first team in the 2001/02 season, during which he played 38 matches for the first team while establishing himself as a firm favourite amongst the fans. The following year he not only played an indispensable role in helping Yeovil achieve promotion to the Football League but his consistency was rewarded with a call-up to the England National XI several times during the season.

It was only a matter of time before a top club such as West Ham United inquired about Weale. Alan Pardew invited the highly rated keeper to train with West Ham for a couple of days a week in March 2004 before playing in a Reserve game for the club. Throughout his career at Huish Park he has been heavily praised, not just from the home fans, but also from opposition managers such as ex-England coach Peter Taylor. Taylor acknowledged after the 0–0 draw at the KC Stadium 'The saves were worthy of the Premiership'. Yeovil boss Gary Johnson describes 'They were world class saves. We see that every day in training. He's a super goalkeeper.' His performance was acknowledged his fellow peers and was chosen for the Football League Team of the Year for League Two on two consecutive seasons.

During his final season with the club, Wealey had to face strong competition for the number one jersey from Steve Collis. Collis showed great promise when he was given the chance in goal during his performance in the latter part of both the 2003/04 and the 2004/05 season and the two keepers split first team responsibilities during the 2005/06 season.

That was in part due to a knee injury sustained by Weale during March 2006 at Chesterfield, which he aggravated a few weeks later. It was later diagnosed as a cruciate ligament injury which meant that his final appearance for the club was against Scunthorpe United on Good Friday in April 2006.

Despite facing a lengthy layoff that was expected to keep him out until at least November 2006, the club still offered Weale a new deal, but he chose instead to sign for Bristol City on a one-year deal on 28 June 2006, teaming up with Gary Johnson – the manager who had introduced him to regular first team football.

=== Bristol City ===
Weale joined Bristol City under the Bosman ruling. He was joined by former teammates Phil Jevons, Liam Fontaine and Lee Johnson and former manager Gary Johnson. He made his debut on 10 February 2007 against Huddersfield Town after Adriano Basso was sent off, and played in the FA Cup replay between City and Middlesbrough and saved a penalty from Yakubu, but City lost the penalty shoot-out 5–4.

On 8 August 2007 Weale joined Hereford United on a one-month loan, but was recalled from his loan spell five days later, after an injury to city's first choice goalkeeper, Adriano Basso. Weale rejoined Hereford on loan on 27 November 2008 on a one-month loan. He managed to make only one appearance before suffering an injury that was expected to keep him out for six weeks.

He rejoined his former club Yeovil Town after their number one Josh Wagenaar got sent off in a game at Brighton. The loan spell was a month and thought to be a favour by former manager Gary Johnson. It was revealed however that the move was funded by a supporters' club. Weale headed in a late equaliser to earn Yeovil a 2–2 draw at home to his former side, Hereford on 21 April 2009. The goal won Sky Sports goal of the week beating the likes of Andrei Arshavin and Robinho.

=== Leicester City ===
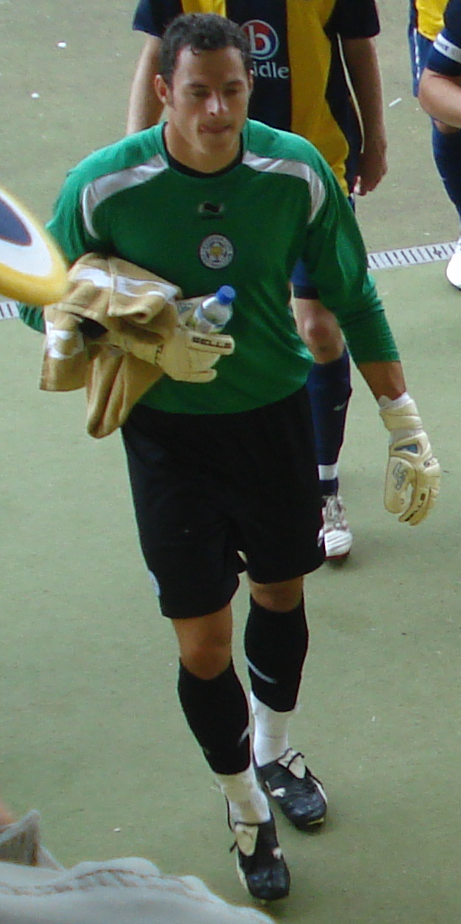
Weale playing for Leicester City in 2010

On 29 May 2009, Weale signed a pre-contractual agreement with Leicester City before joining on 1 July when his contract with Bristol City expired. Tim Flowers, who was previously coach at the club, felt Weale's ever-present form as of February 2010 is a big part of the team's resurgence in the 2009–10 season. However, in a 1–0 defeat to Derby County at Pride Park on 27 March 2010, Weale erred badly to concede the goal from a back-pass. On 22 April 2011, Weale mishandled Paul McKenna's shot and spilled it into his own net for the winning goal in a 3–2 against Nottingham Forest. Weale fell out of favour at Leicester City with the signing of Kasper Schmeichel from Leeds United and only played three matches in the 2011/12 season before a brief loan spell at League Two side Northampton Town. This loan spell was cut short through injury and on his return, Weale was released at the end of the season by Leicester along with five other players.

=== Shrewsbury Town ===
On 6 July 2012, Weale signed for newly promoted League One side Shrewsbury Town on an undisclosed contract.

He made his debut on 11 August 2012 in a 4–0 loss away to Leeds United in the League Cup, and was almost ever present in the 2012/13 season making 46 league starts, starting in an FA Cup first round defeat to former club Hereford United and coming on as a substitute in a Football League Trophy tie against eventual winners Crewe Alexandra. In Shrewsbury Town's Player of the Year Awards 2013, Weale was awarded "Player's Player of the Year" and "Player of the Year".

Following Shrewsbury's relegation the following season, Weale was released at the end of his contract.

=== Return to Yeovil ===
Weale signed for League One team Yeovil Town on a two-year contract on 30 June 2014.

On 15 November 2014, Weale joined League Two side Burton Albion on a month's loan.

At the end of the 2014–15 season, Weale signed a new contract with Yeovil to become a player-goalkeeping coach. He was released by Yeovil at the end of the 2015–16 season.

=== Derby County ===
On 31 August 2016, Weale was signed by Championship side Derby County as goalkeeping cover. On 17 January 2017, Weale was released after having his contract cancelled by mutual consent having not made a first team appearance for the club.

=== Dorchester Town ===
On 29 May 2017, it was announced that Weale had agreed terms with Southern League Premier Division side Dorchester Town.

=== Exeter City ===
In July 2018, Weale signed a one-year contract at Exeter City to become a player-goalkeeper coach however on the understanding it was unlikely he would ever play. After two and half years at Exeter City, Weale decided to hang up his boots and return closer to home where he became the Director of Football Coaching at Sherborne School.

== Personal life ==
Weale's twin brother, Sam, is a two-time former Olympic modern pentathlete, who competed for Great Britain at both the 2008 and 2012 Summer Olympics.

== Career statistics ==
Appearances and goals by club, season and competition
Club	Season	League			FA Cup		League Cup		Other		Total	
Club	Season	Division	Apps	Goals	Apps	Goals	Apps	Goals	Apps	Goals	Apps	Goals
Yeovil Town	2000–01	Conference	4	0	0	0	—		5 (Note: One appearance in FA Trophy, one appearance in Football League Trophy, one appearance in Conference League Cup, two appearances in Somerset Premier Cup)	0	9	0
Yeovil Town	2001–02	Conference	27	0	1	0	—		10 (Note: Eight appearances in FA Trophy, two appearances in Football League Trophy)	0	38	0
Yeovil Town	2002–03	Conference	34	0	3	0	—		4 (Note: Appearances in FA Trophy)	0	41	0
Yeovil Town	2003–04	Third Division	35	0	3	0	1	0	1 (Note: Appearance(s) in Football League Trophy)	0	40	0
Yeovil Town	2004–05	League Two	38	0	5	0	2	0	0	0	45	0
Yeovil Town	2005–06	League One	25	0	3	0	2	0	1	0	45	0
Yeovil Town	Total		163	0	15	0	5	0	21	0	204	0
Bristol City	2006–07	League One	1	0	1	0	0	0	0	0	2	0
Bristol City	2007–08	Championship	3	0	0	0	2	0	0	0	5	0
Bristol City	2008–09	Championship	5	0	0	0	2	0	—		7	0
Bristol City	Total		9	0	1	0	4	0	0	0	14	0
Hereford United (loan)	2007–08	League Two	1	0	—		—		—		1	0
Hereford United (loan)	2008–09	League One	1	0	—		—		—		1	0
Hereford United (loan)	Total		2	0	—		—		—		2	0
Yeovil Town (loan)	2008–09	League One	10	1	—		—		—		10	1
Leicester City	2009–10	Championship	45	0	2	0	2	0	2 (Note: Appearances in Football League Championship play-offs)	0	51	0
Leicester City	2010–11	Championship	29	0	2	0	0	0	—		31	0
Leicester City	2011–12	Championship	1	0	0	0	2	0	—		3	0
Leicester City	Total		75	0	4	0	4	0	2	0	85	0
Northampton Town (loan)	2011–12	League Two	3	0	—		—		—		3	0
Shrewsbury Town	2012–13	League One	46	0	1	0	1	0	1	0	49	0
Shrewsbury Town	2013–14	League One	35	0	1	0	1	0	0	0	37	0
Shrewsbury Town	Total		81	0	2	0	2	0	1	0	86	0
Yeovil Town	2014–15	League One	8	0	0	0	0	0	1	0	9	0
Yeovil Town	2015–16	League Two	9	0	2	0	0	0	2	0	13	0
Yeovil Town	Total		17	0	2	0	0	0	3	0	22	0
Burton Albion (loan)	2014–15	League Two	0	0	0	0	0	0	0	0	0	0
Derby County	2016–17	Championship	0	0	0	0	0	0	—		0	0
Derby County U23	2016–17	—			—		—		1 (Note: Appearance in EFL Trophy)	0	1	0
Dorchester Town	2017–18	SL Premier Division	45	0	1	0	—		4 (Note: Two appearances in FA Trophy, one appearance in Southern League Cup, one in Dorset Senior Cup)	0	50	0
Exeter City	2018–19	League Two	0	0	0	0	0	0	0	0	0	0
Career total			405	1	25	0	15	0	32	0	477	1

== Honours ==
Yeovil Town

- Football League Two: 2004–05
- FA Trophy: 2001–02

Individual

- Football Conference Team of the Year: 2002–03
- PFA Team of the Year: 2003–04 Third Division, 2004–05 Football League Two
