= Sean St Ledger =

Footballer (born 1984)

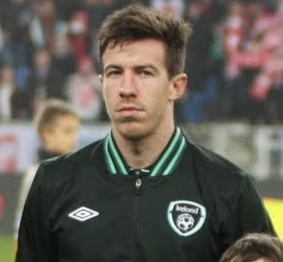
- St Ledger for the Republic of Ireland in 2013

Personal information
- Full name: Sean Patrick St Ledger-Hall
- Date of birth: 28 December 1984 (age 41)
- Place of birth: Solihull, England
- Height: 1.83 m (6 ft 0 in)
- Position: Defender

Youth career
- 2001–2002: Peterborough United

Senior career*
Years	Team	Apps	(Gls)
2002–2006	Peterborough United	79	(1)
2004	→ Stevenage Borough (loan)	0	(0)
2006–2011	Preston North End	185	(10)
2009	→ Middlesbrough (loan)	16	(2)
2011–2014	Leicester City	36	(0)
2013	→ Millwall (loan)	6	(0)
2014	Ipswich Town	0	(0)
2015	Orlando City	15	(0)
2015–2016	Colorado Rapids	12	(0)
2017–2018	Solihull Moors	0	(0)
2018	Guiseley	7	(0)
Total		304	(12)

International career
2009–2013	Republic of Ireland	37	(3)

Managerial career
- 2018: Guiseley (caretaker)
- * Club domestic league appearances and goals

Sean Patrick St Ledger-Hall (born 28 December 1984) is a former professional footballer who played as a defender. Born in England, he played international football for the Republic of Ireland.

He was part of the team that lost controversially to France in the play-offs for the 2010 FIFA World Cup, later playing and scoring in UEFA Euro 2012. His equaliser against Croatia at Stadion Miejski in Poznań on 10 June 2012 introduced St Ledger into an elite club of Irish goalscorers at the UEFA European Championship.

St Ledger's career started with Peterborough United. He had stints at Preston North End and a loan spell with Middlesbrough before his move to Leicester City in 2011.

== Club career ==
=== Peterborough United ===
Growing up in Solihull, England, as an Aston Villa supporter, St Ledger's career started in the youth system at Peterborough United where he played alongside Ryan Semple and Luke Steele, before joining the first team in 2002, playing mostly as a central defender, though occasionally as a full back or in midfield. He joined Football Conference club Stevenage Borough on loan in January 2004. Following a loan spell with Stevenage came to an end, St Ledger signed a three-year contract with the club. St Ledger was dropped in the first team and dropped to the bench, citing his bad attitude, in a 1–1 draw with Lincoln City on 21 January 2006.

He featured in Sky's series Big Ron Manager, a behind the scenes look at Peterborough United's struggle to enter the Football League Two play-offs at the end of the 2005–06 season.

=== Preston North End ===
After a trial with Birmingham City on Barry Fry's recommendation, St Ledger signed a three-year contract with Preston North End in July 2006 for a fee of £225,000, which could rise to £350,000. Manager Paul Simpsons believed that St Ledger could be a top right-back player.

On 5 August 2006, St Ledger made his debut for Preston in a 0–0 draw with Sheffield Wednesday at centre half alongside fellow new signing Liam Chilvers and since then, St Ledger formed a partnership with Chilvers in central defence. On 9 April 2007, St Ledger scored his first goal for Preston in a 3–2 loss against Southend United. In his first season at Deepdale, St Ledger made 42 appearances whilst scoring one goal as Preston, who had been top of the league mid-season, failed to retain a playoff berth come May.

St Ledger began the 2007–08 season as first choice centre half alongside Youl Mawéné, scoring his second goal for Preston in a 1–0 win over Coventry City on 9 February 2008. The following week, St Ledger received the first red card of his Preston career in a 2–1 defeat at Colchester United, St Ledger taking out United's Karl Duguid as he went through on goal. St Ledger made 37 appearances for Preston during 2007/08 as the Lilywhites were guided clear of the relegation thanks to a late upturn in results under new manager Alan Irvine. For his impressive season, St Ledger was named the club's Player of the Year award and had so many awards by the club he have thank them five times.

St Ledger's third and probably most impressive season came in 2008/09 with St Ledger scoring six goals against Watford, Barnsley, Derby, Wolves, QPR and Sheffield Wednesday as the Lancashire club reached the Championship Playoff Semi-finals. It was St Ledger's late winner in a 2–1 victory over QPR that clinched the final playoff spot on the last day of the season, heading in a long throw by Jon Parkin. St Ledger made 47 appearances in 2008/09 as well as playing in both legs of the playoff semi-final against Sheffield United which Preston lost 1–2 on aggregate. During the season, St Ledger signed a four-year contract in late-October.

St Ledger started 2009–10 as impressively as he had done the previous season but after only seven appearances for Preston, St Ledger joined Middlesbrough on loan with a view to a £4 million permanent move come the January transfer window. Rumours at the time told of how club chairman Derek Shaw informed St Ledger on the Preston team coach travelling to that evening's fixture at Scunthorpe that he had to join 'Boro as cash-strapped Preston needed the transfer money. St Ledger left his teammates en route to Lincolnshire and headed for Teesside. Following a loan return, Celtic made a £3 million bid to sign St Ledger. However, the move never happened and St Ledger was disappointed with the move. Despite a failed transfer to Celtic, St Ledger maintained his commitment to stay at Preston. St Ledger went on to make 22 appearances for Preston in what became a nightmare season as he saw mentor Alan Irvine sacked one game after his return from Middlesbrough. The centre half scored two further goals against Plymouth Argyle and West Bromwich Albion and Preston hung on to Championship status under Irvine's replacement, Darren Ferguson.

St Ledger's final season at Deepdale came in 2010–11 when he switched shirt from number twelve to four. However, his season was blighted by injury and loss of form as Preston struggled under Ferguson. Despite Ferguson's dismissal in December 2010 and an eventual improvement in results under successor Phil Brown, St Ledger could not help Preston being relegated to League One. St Ledger played his final game for Preston on 19 March 2011 at home to Coventry before injury finished his season early. In his fifth and final season, St Ledger played 32 times from Preston, scoring his final goal for the club during the campaign at Watford in a 2–2 draw. Considered too good for League One football and with Preston desperate for both money from transfers and from a drop in the wage bill St Ledger left Deepdale in the summer of 2011 to join Leicester City.

=== Middlesbrough (loan) ===
In September 2009, St Ledger joined Middlesbrough on an initial three-month loan deal with a view to a permanent transfer in the January transfer window, however after failing to settle in the north east, the move was not made permanent and St Ledger returned to Preston.

He made his full debut for Boro on 19 September 2009 against West Bromwich Albion, which Middlesbrough lost 5–0. The next game after making his debut, St Ledger scored his first goal for Middlesbrough against Coventry City in late September. A week later, on 3 October 2009, St Ledger scored his second goal of the season, in a 2–0 win over Reading. He then played against parent club, Preston North End, which described his return as "bittersweet" and was applauded by both set of supporters during the match.

The loan spell proved to be an unhappy move for St Ledger who saw manager Gareth Southgate sacked shortly after signing the defender. St Ledger quickly fell out with new manager Gordon Strachan and was told he was no longer part of the Scotsman's plans. St Ledger returned to Preston after his loan deal at Middlesbrough expired, failing to sign the permanent deal originally agreed by the two clubs earlier in the season. Manager Strachan revealed he could have persuaded him to stay at the club.

=== Leicester City ===
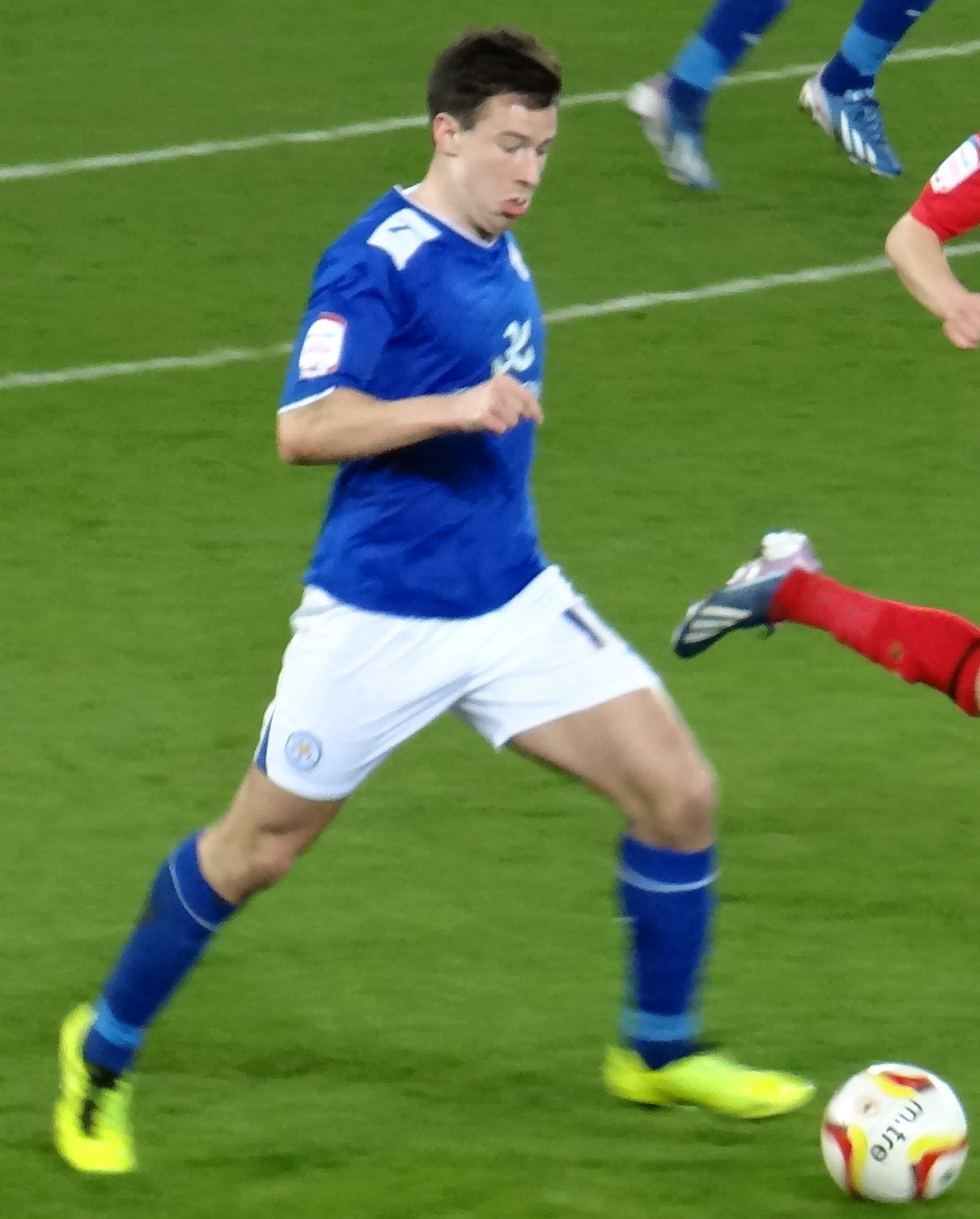
St Ledger playing for Leicester City in 2013.

On 4 July 2011, St Ledger joined Leicester City on a three-year contract for an undisclosed fee. He made his debut on 17 August 2011 in a 2–1 loss to Bristol City. After a row with manager Nigel Pearson on being unhappy about being dropped for the Boxing Day fixture against Ipswich Town, St Ledger was told he would never play for the Midlands club again and was transfer listed. Leicester and Ipswich Town agreed a fee for the defender but Ipswich manager Paul Jewell said although everything was agreed an injury in training to Leicester defender Aleksander Tunchev put the deal on hold as St Ledger was needed for cover.

After Sol Bamba also left for the 2012 Africa Cup of Nations the following week Leicester were forced to bring St Ledger back into the team because of lack of cover. St Ledger impressed on being brought back into the team, with Pearson saying he was "delighted with his performances," so much so that he was taken off the transfer list and his proposed transfer to Ipswich was cancelled. St Ledger then became a permanent fixture in Nigel Pearson's side throughout the 2011–12 season.

However, ahead of the 2012–13 season, St Ledger sustained a knee injury in a pre-season friendly match against Burton Albion and missed the start of the season. St Ledger made his first league appearance of the season on 1 September, playing at right-back in a 1–0 win over Blackpool. He then had a run of games in the first-team until pulling his hamstring in a 2–0 win over Bristol City on 6 October, an injury which required specialist treatment in Germany. By January, he had resumed light training.

After making his recovery from injury, St Ledger joined Millwall on an emergency loan that will keep him until the end of the season.

On 28 May 2013, St Ledger announced he had been told he was surplus to requirements and had been advised to look for a new club. He made his first appearance of the 2013–14 season in Leicester's 2–1 opening day win over Middlesbrough and in the League Cup he scored the winner in a 2–1 win over Wycombe Wanderers. These would turn out to be his only appearances of the season as he suffered a recurrence of the knee injury that caused him to miss a large part of the previous season.

Despite this, he was presented with a winner's medal as Leicester were promoted to the Premier League as champions. He was released by the club at the end of the season after his contract expired.

=== Ipswich Town ===
St Ledger joined Ipswich Town on a short-term contract on 27 November 2014. However, he made no appearances for Ipswich and his only involvement in the team was being named as an unused substitute for the club's wins over Charlton Athletic and Leeds United. On 29 December, he was released by the club.

=== Orlando City ===
After a successful trial, St Ledger signed with Orlando City of Major League Soccer on 5 March 2015. His contract was terminated by the club on 1 August 2015 after a "serious breach of club policy". The Orlando Sentinel reported that Orlando City SC released St Ledger for missing a team flight and several days of training.

=== Return to Leicester City ===
Whilst recovering from long-term injury after leaving Orlando, St. Ledger scouted for former club Leicester City. He played for the club's under-21 side in a pre-season friendly against Leamington in July 2017.

=== Solihull Moors and Guiseley ===
In October 2017, St Ledger joined Solihull Moors of the National League, making his debut in a 2–0 defeat to Wycombe Wanderers on 5 November. He did not make a league appearance for the club and, in January 2018, joined Solihull's divisional rivals Guiseley, where he took caretaker charge of the team between February and May 2018.

== International career ==
Born and raised in England, St Ledger was eligible to play for the Republic of Ireland because his grandparents are both from Carlow. Shortly after joining Preston, St Ledger was called up by Manager Steve Staunton, which he described as "it doesn't get any better than this."

After being called up by newly appointed Manager Giovanni Trapattoni, He made his debut in a friendly against Nigeria at Craven Cottage on 29 May 2009, and played his first competitive match a week later, a 1–1 draw away to Bulgaria in a qualifying game for the 2010 FIFA World Cup. St Ledger scored his first goal for Ireland in a 2–2 with Italy at Croke Park, Dublin, in a FIFA World Cup qualifier in October 2009. The goal gave Ireland a late lead against the World Champions and was almost St Ledger's "Ray Houghton" moment, guaranteeing him iconic status in only his sixth appearance, only for Alberto Gilardino to score an even later equaliser for the Italians.

On 12 October 2010, St Ledger scored his second goal for Ireland in a UEFA Euro 2012 qualifier against Slovakia which finished 1–1.

On 10 June 2012, he scored his third international goal against Croatia in Ireland's first group stage game at UEFA Euro 2012. His header was the equaliser to make the score 1–1 after Ireland had fallen behind in the first half, though they lost the game 3–1. It turned out to be the team's only goal of the competition, as they exited the group stage with three defeats from three games and 9 goals conceded.

== Post-retirement roles ==
As of 2023, St Ledger was working as senior scout at Leicester City.

== Career statistics ==
=== Club ===
Appearances and goals by club, season and competition
Club	Season	League			National cup		League cup		Other		Total	
Club	Season	Division	Apps	Goals	Apps	Goals	Apps	Goals	Apps	Goals	Apps	Goals
Peterborough United	2002–03	Second Division	1	0	0	0	0	0	0	0	1	0
Peterborough United	2003–04	Second Division	2	0	0	0	0	0	1 (Note: Appearance(s) in Football League Trophy)	0	3	0
Peterborough United	2004–05	League One	33	0	4	0	0	0	1	0	38	0
Peterborough United	2005–06	League Two	43	1	2	0	1	0	3	0	49	1
Peterborough United	Total		79	1	6	0	1	0	5	0	91	1
Preston North End	2006–07	Championship	8	0	0	0	0	0	—		8	0
Preston North End	2007–08	Championship	17	1	0	0	0	0	—		17	1
Preston North End	2008–09	Championship	46	5	1	0	2	0	2 (Note: Appearances in Championship play-offs)	1	51	6
Preston North End	2009–10	Championship	31	2	2	0	1	0	—		34	2
Preston North End	2010–11	Championship	31	1	1	0	2	0	—		34	1
Preston North End	Total		133	9	4	0	5	0	2	1	144	10
Middlesbrough (loan)	2009–10	Championship	16	2	—		—		—		16	2
Leicester City	2011–12	Championship	26	0	4	1	2	0	—		32	1
Leicester City	2012–13	Championship	9	0	—		1	0	—		10	0
Leicester City	2013–14	Championship	1	0	0	0	1	1	—		2	1
Leicester City	Total		36	0	4	1	4	1	—		44	2
Millwall (loan)	2012–13	Championship	6	0	1	0	—		—		7	0
Ipswich Town	2014–15	Championship	0	0	0	0	0	0	0	0	0	0
Orlando City	2015	MLS	15	0	3	0	—		—		18	0
Colorado Rapids	2015	MLS	12	0	0	0	—		—		12	0
Solihull Moors	2017–18	National League	0	0	1	0	—		0	0	1	0
Guiseley	2017–18	National League	7	0	—		—		0	0	7	0
Career total			304	12	19	1	10	1	7	1	340	15

=== International ===
Scores and results list the Republic of Ireland's goal tally first, score column indicates score after each St Ledger goal.

List of international goals scored by Sean St Ledger
No.	Date	Venue	Opponent	Score	Result	Competition	Ref.
1	10 October 2009	Croke Park, Dublin, Ireland	Italy	2–1	2–2	2010 FIFA World Cup qualification	
2	12 October 2010	Štadión pod Dubňom, Žilina, Slovakia	Slovakia	1–0	1–1	UEFA Euro 2012 qualification	
3	10 June 2012	Municipal Stadium, Poznań, Poland	Croatia	1–1	1–3	UEFA Euro 2012	

== Honours ==
Leicester City

- Football League Championship: 2013–14

Republic of Ireland

- Nations Cup: 2011

Individual

- Preston North End Player of the Year: 2007–08

== See also ==
- List of Republic of Ireland international footballers born outside the Republic of Ireland
