= Kasper Schmeichel =

Danish footballer (born 1986)

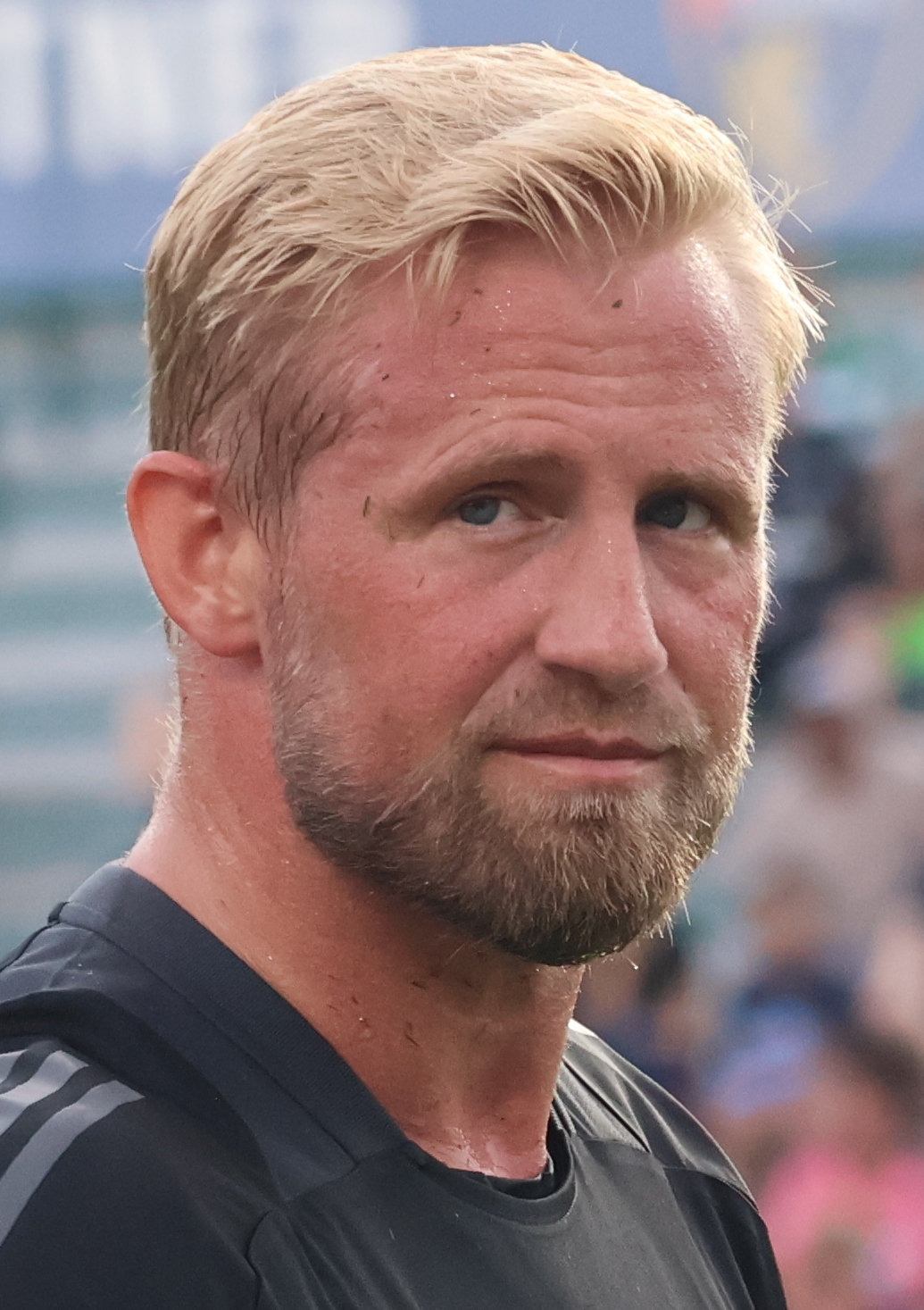
- Schmeichel in 2024

Personal information
- Full name: Kasper Peter Schmeichel
- Date of birth: 5 November 1986 (age 40)
- Place of birth: Copenhagen, Denmark
- Height: 1.89 m (6 ft 2 in)
- Position: Goalkeeper

Youth career
- 2000–2001: Estoril
- 2001–2002: Oure
- 2002–2006: Manchester City

Senior career*
Years	Team	Apps	(Gls)
2006–2009	Manchester City	8	(0)
2006	→ Darlington (loan)	4	(0)
2006	→ Bury (loan)	29	(0)
2007	→ Falkirk (loan)	15	(0)
2007–2008	→ Cardiff City (loan)	14	(0)
2008	→ Coventry City (loan)	9	(0)
2009–2010	Notts County	43	(0)
2010–2011	Leeds United	37	(0)
2011–2022	Leicester City	414	(0)
2022–2023	Nice	36	(0)
2023–2024	Anderlecht	31	(0)
2024–2026	Celtic	58	(0)
Total		698	(0)

International career
2004–2005	Denmark U19	8	(0)
2006	Denmark U20	1	(0)
2007–2008	Denmark U21	17	(0)
2013–2025	Denmark	120	(0)
- * Club domestic league appearances and goals

Kasper Peter Schmeichel (born 5 November 1986) is a Danish former professional footballer who played as a goalkeeper.

Schmeichel began his career with Manchester City, but had loan spells with Darlington, Bury and Falkirk before he made his first-team debut in 2007; after a short period as starting goalkeeper, he went on further loan spells to Cardiff City and Coventry City. After falling down the pecking order behind Joe Hart and Shay Given, he departed for Notts County in League Two on a permanent deal in 2009, reuniting with former City manager Sven-Göran Eriksson, before signing for Championship side Leeds United a year later.

After one year at Leeds, Schmeichel was signed by fellow Championship side Leicester City in 2011, reuniting again with Eriksson. He went on to make 479 competitive appearances for Leicester over 11 years, during the most successful era in the club's history, winning the Championship in 2014, the Premier League in 2016, and the FA Cup and Community Shield in 2021, additionally serving as club captain in his final season before departing in 2022. Following spells across Europe with Nice and Anderlecht, Schmeichel returned to Scotland to sign with Celtic in 2024, reuniting with former Leicester manager Brendan Rodgers. During his time at Celtic, he won a domestic double twice, lifting the Scottish League Cup, Scottish Cup and also the Scottish Premiership twice.

A former Denmark under-21 international, Schmeichel was called up to the senior team for the first time in 2011, and was part of their squad at UEFA Euro 2012, but did not make his senior debut until 2013. He since made 120 international appearances, and represented his country at the 2018 FIFA World Cup, Euro 2020, the 2022 World Cup and Euro 2024.

Schmeichel announced his retirement from professional football in May 2026.

== Early life ==
=== Formative years and education ===
Kasper Schmeichel was born on 5 November 1986 in Copenhagen, Denmark. He is the son of former Denmark international goalkeeper Peter Schmeichel, and is of Polish descent through his paternal grandfather.

Schmeichel grew up in Denmark during his early years but spent most of his childhood living in England due to his father's playing career. He is a native speaker of both Danish and English and speaks with a Mancunian accent. He attended Hulme Hall Grammar School in Cheadle Hulme, Stockport, Greater Manchester, and he also attended Saint Julian's School in Portugal while his father played for Sporting CP in Lisbon. Growing up, Schmeichel was friends with Alex Bruce after their fathers had played together at Manchester United, going onto play together as professionals at Leeds United.

=== Youth-team career ===
Schmeichel started playing organised football in Portugal in 2000, while his father was part of Sporting CP. He played one season in the Estoril youth academy, in which he managed to win a championship. Commenting on his early footballing years, Schmeichel remarked: "Before [Estoril], it wasn't that serious. I have to admit that when I was very small, football did not interest me that much. It was mostly in short periods that it was fun, and then I had enough. So it only started to take shape when I was 12–13 years old".

In 2001, Schmeichel moved to Denmark where he attended Oure Efterskole, an efterskole or voluntary independent residential school for young people finishing their primary education. Schmeichel said in an interview with Euroman in 2014: "At Oure, I was part of an environment and met a coach who made me want to develop even more as a goalkeeper". Schmeichel, at the time, was described as hard-working and dedicated by coach Bo Pedersen. While enrolled at Oure, Schmeichel trialled with Brøndby, but would instead move to Manchester City after another successful trial.

== Club career ==
=== Manchester City ===
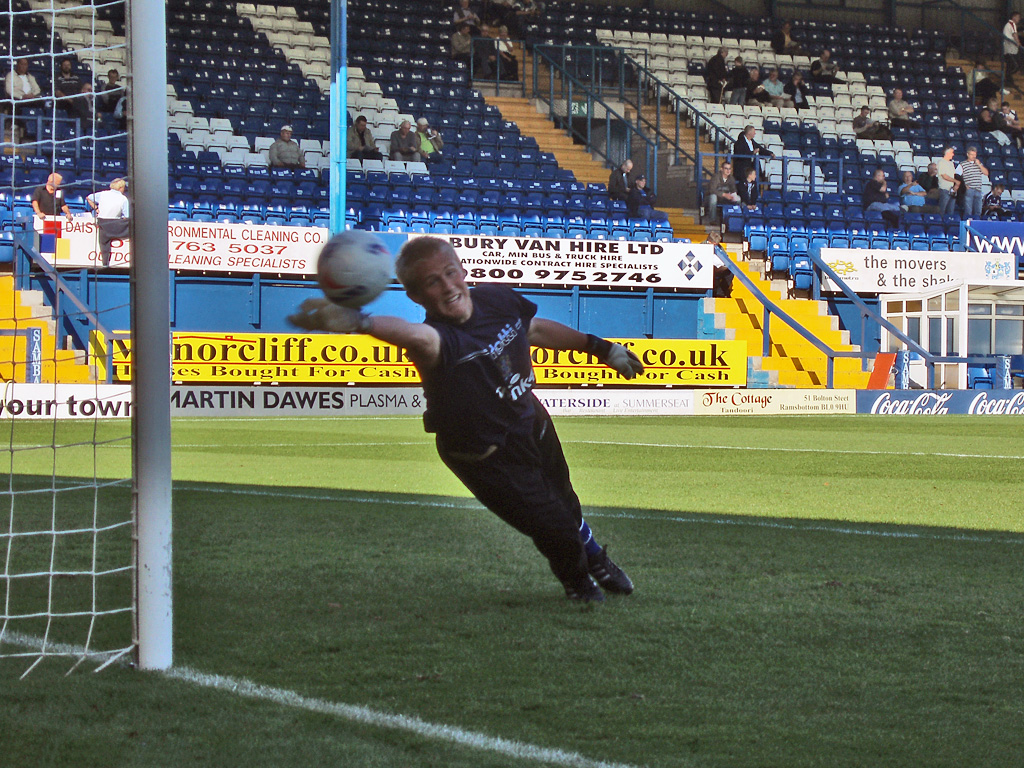
Schmeichel making a save while training with Bury in 2006

Schmeichel joined Manchester City in September 2002 on a long-term contract, which covered schoolboy, scholar and professional terms. He joined League Two side Darlington on a loan deal in January 2006, where he made his professional first-team debut against Peterborough United at the Darlington Arena on 14 January 2006. Darlington won the game 2–1, with Schmeichel conceding a goal to Peterborough striker James Quinn. He gained his first clean sheet three days later against Grimsby Town. He made two further appearances before returning to Manchester City.

One month after returning to Manchester City, he was loaned out again, this time to Bury in February, where he made 15 appearances in a three-month loan spell. He returned to Bury for a further three months the following season.

Schmeichel joined Scottish Premier League side Falkirk on loan from January 2007 until the end of the 2006–07 season. He was named man of the match against Rangers on 18 February 2007. He also saved a Craig Beattie penalty in a 1–0 win over Celtic on 18 March 2007. He revealed in May he would have liked his loan at Falkirk extended, and the club expressed an interest in signing him.

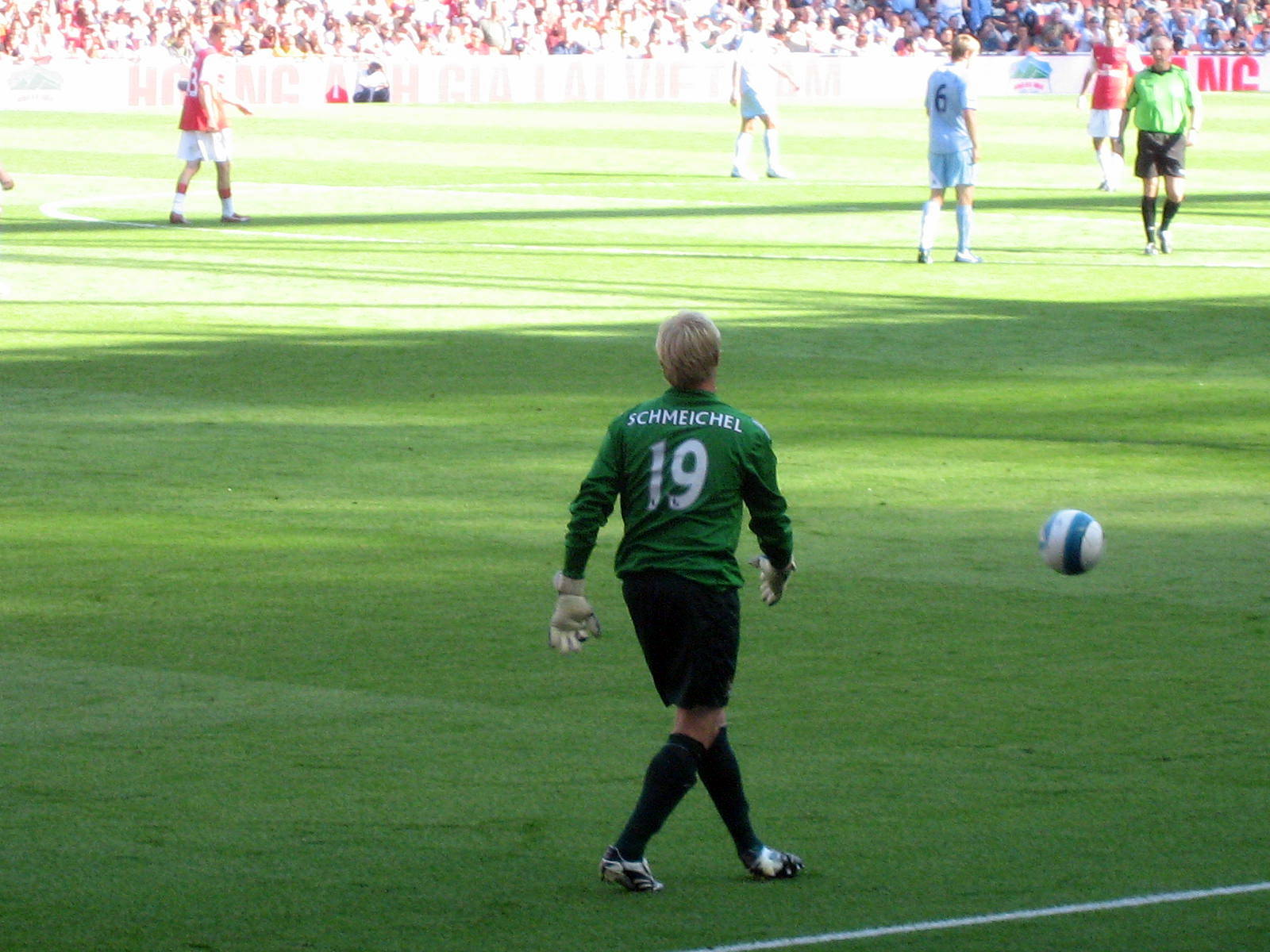
Schmeichel playing for Manchester City in 2007

Schmeichel made his Manchester City debut against West Ham United in August 2007. He played against City's rivals Manchester United on 19 August 2007 and kept a clean sheet in City's 1–0 home win. Schmeichel saved a penalty from Arsenal's Robin van Persie on 25 August 2007 at the Emirates Stadium. Despite City losing 1–0 to Arsenal, he was named man of the match. He played the first seven of Manchester City's games in the 2007–08 Premier League, keeping clean sheets against Manchester United, West Ham, Aston Villa and Derby County, conceding only five goals.

He signed a new four-year deal with City in September 2007. This was then followed up with an agreement to go on a one-month loan with Championship side Cardiff City on 25 October 2007. He made his debut for Cardiff on 27 October 2007 in a 1–1 draw with Scunthorpe United. He was named 2007 Danish Under-21 Talent of the Year.

Towards the end of the loan spell, Schmeichel requested that he would be allowed to stay on at Cardiff for a longer period and on 22 November, the loan spell was extended until the new year, with manager Sven-Göran Eriksson stating that he could possibly stay at the club for the rest of the season providing Manchester City do not suffer an injury crisis. After Eriksson named Joe Hart as the number one goalkeeper at Manchester City, however, Andreas Isaksson requested a transfer. This meant that Eriksson would not allow Cardiff to keep Schmeichel after his initial loan period ended on 2 January. On 31 December, Eriksson threw Cardiff a lifeline by opening talks for Schmeichel to stay at Ninian Park. Schmeichel would be allowed to stay for two more matches should Isaksson not move until late in the January transfer window. Schmeichel had stated he would like to play for Cardiff again in the future. Schmeichel, however, returned to Eastlands the day after his initial loan expired.

He joined Coventry City on loan until the end of the season on 13 March. Towards the end of the season, his father, Peter Schmeichel, commented during a TV interview that his son was not happy at Manchester City and was set to leave following the end of the season.

Despite wanting to leave, Schmeichel returned to the City of Manchester Stadium at the end of the season and changed to the number 16 shirt. He repeatedly stated that he wanted to leave City and regretted signing a four-year contract.

On 16 November, Schmeichel entered a game as a substitute after Joe Hart injured his ankle in the 14th minute. City went on to a 2–2 result with Hull City. In December 2008, Schmeichel played his last game for Manchester City in a UEFA Cup match against Racing de Santander.

=== Notts County ===
On 14 August 2009, Schmeichel signed for League Two side Notts County in a deal that is believed to have broken the club's previous transfer record. The transfer reunited Schmeichel with his former Manchester City manager, Sven-Göran Eriksson, who had recently been appointed director of football for Notts. He was the highest paid player at the club, earning £1 million annually. He made his debut on 22 August and kept a clean sheet in the side's 3–0 win against Dagenham & Redbridge. In September 2009, Schmeichel almost scored with an audacious overhead kick against Morecambe when he came up from a corner late on in the game.

A fine string of performances in October earned Schmeichel the Player of the Month award. During Schmeichel's stay at The Magpies, the club conceded only 0.67 goals per League Two match (29 goals conceded in 43 league appearances). Schmeichel's clean-sheets-to-game-ratio at Notts County was an impressive 55.8 percent (24 out of 43 league appearances). On 27 April, Schmeichel and Notts County secured the 2009–10 League Two title and promotion to League One with a 5–0 win against already relegated Darlington. Shortly before the game, it was announced that Notts County agreed to release Schmeichel at the end of the season, despite having four years left on his contract. The reasoning behind this was financial: Schmeichel earned a reported £15,000 per week, having been signed during the brief ownership period of high-spending Munto Finance in the summer 2009. Schmeichel agreed to forgo all his future wages, something which chairman Ray Trew described as "a huge concession by such a young man".

=== Leeds United ===
On 27 May 2010, having been linked with both Premier League and Bundesliga clubs, Schmeichel signed a two-year contract with Leeds United, joining the club on 1 July 2010. Schmeichel was given the number 1 shirt at Leeds for the 2010–11 season and was made Leeds' first choice goalkeeper for the forthcoming season, ahead of Shane Higgs. He made his debut for the club on Saturday 7 August 2010 in Leeds' opening Football League Championship match against Derby County. Despite Leeds losing 2–1, Schmeichel put in an impressive performance, making several crucial saves during the match. After a string of impressive games for Leeds, Schmeichel was nominated for the August Championship Player of the Month award, but lost out to Queens Park Rangers winger Adel Taarabt. Schmeichel, however, did win the Sky Sports Championship Player of the Month award for August.

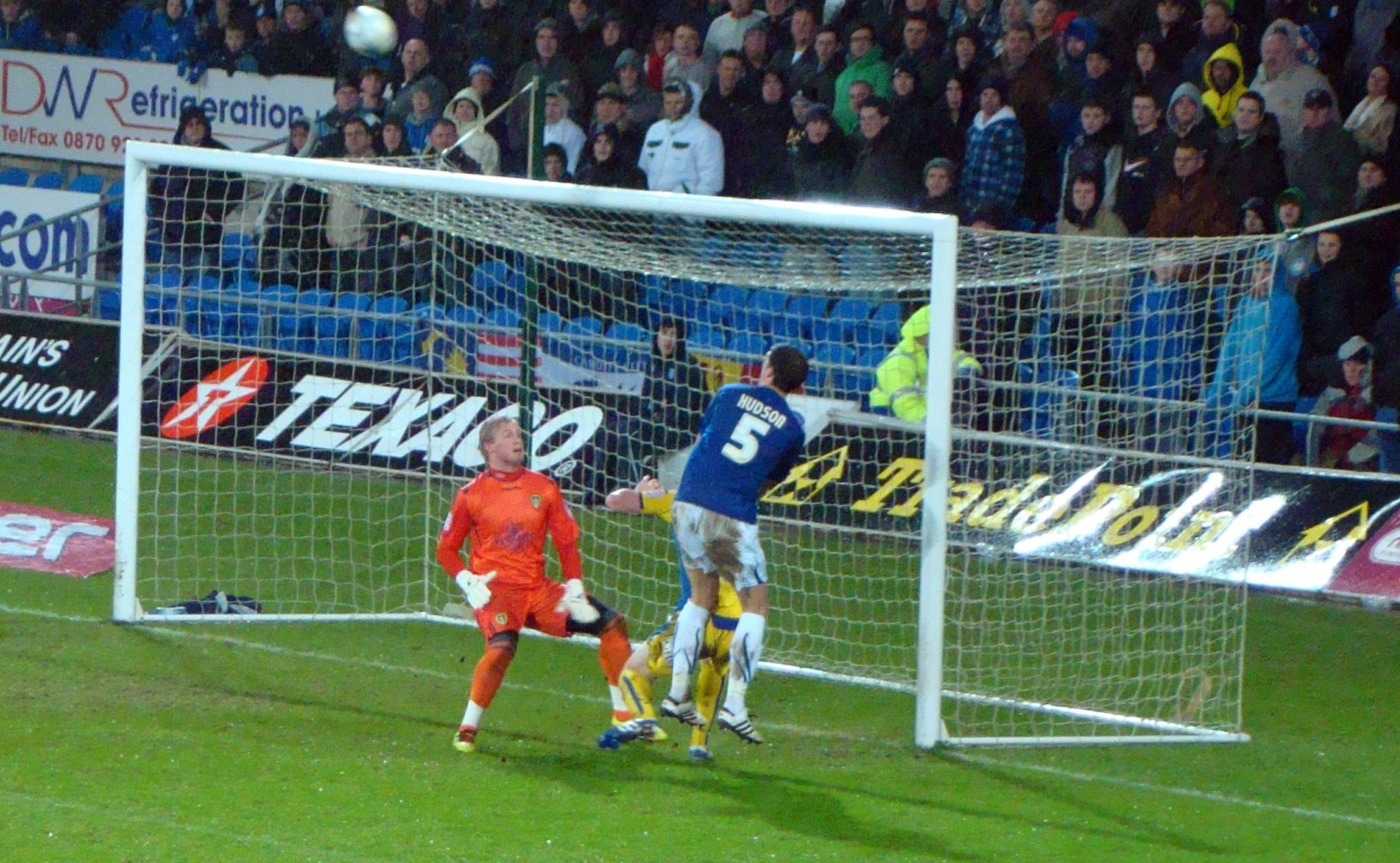
Schmeichel (in orange) playing for Leeds United in 2011

After picking up a tendon injury in his foot, Schmeichel missed the game against Swansea City and was ruled out of Leeds' next few games. While out injured, Schmeichel appeared on Soccer AM as one of the guests on the show. After just under two months out, Schmeichel returned to the Leeds starting line-up against Cardiff City. He was set to play against Coventry City on 6 November, but due to the birth of his first child the night before, he missed the game.

On 8 January 2011, Schmeichel helped Leeds earn a 1–1 draw against Arsenal in the FA Cup third round match at the Emirates Stadium. After the match, Arsenal captain Cesc Fàbregas commented that Schmeichel should have received the match ball for his performance. Although Leeds lost the replay 3–1, Schmeichel produced another impressive display (nearly scoring himself via a header) and he was subsequently named player of the FA Cup third round.

On 27 June 2011, Leeds announced they had accepted an undisclosed bid for him from Leicester City. With Schmeichel wanting to stay at Leeds for the remainder of his contract, he admitted that the decision to sell him was a real shock. However, Schmeichel said that moving to Leeds was the wrong move for him, particularly because he was made to feel unwelcome at the club because of his father's history.

=== Leicester City ===
==== 2011–12 season ====
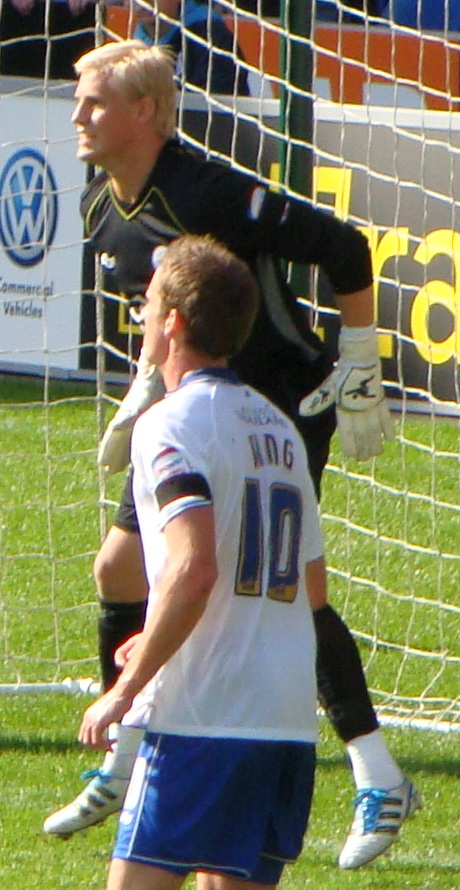
Schmeichel (rear) playing for Leicester City in 2011

On 27 June 2011, Schmeichel was officially confirmed as a Leicester player, signing a three-year deal for an undisclosed fee that reunited him for a second time with his former Manchester City manager and Notts County director of football, Sven-Göran Eriksson.

In the first month of the season, Schmeichel was shown a seemingly needless red card in the 79th minute of Leicester's away game to Nottingham Forest on 20 August 2011 after receiving two yellow cards for "unsporting conduct". He received the first card for moving the ball from the penalty spot as Forest's Lewis McGugan was about to take a kick, then received his second for throwing the ball away after the spot kick was successfully converted. After the match, Schmeichel apologized, claiming his back was turned to the referee so did not know he had received the first of the yellow cards. "I didn't know I had been booked as I had my back to the ref otherwise I would never have done that," he said on his personal Twitter page. Despite this, Schmeichel's performances for Leicester quickly began earning him plaudits, with his then manager Sven-Göran Eriksson comparing him with England number 1 goalkeeper Joe Hart, and teammate and former England international Paul Konchesky describing him as "one of the best [goalkeepers] he has ever played with". A short-distant reaction save against Portsmouth in November 2011, in particular, earned Schmeichel praise and was described by Portsmouth manager Michael Appleton as "one of the best saves I have seen in a very long time". and by Leicester manager Nigel Pearson as "a world-class, outstanding save and was very important at that point of the game".

Schmeichel played a total of 52 games overall, making 17 clean sheets and saving four penalties. His performances in the 2011–12 season earned him the club's Player of the Year and Players' Player of the Year awards on 30 April.

==== 2012–13 season ====
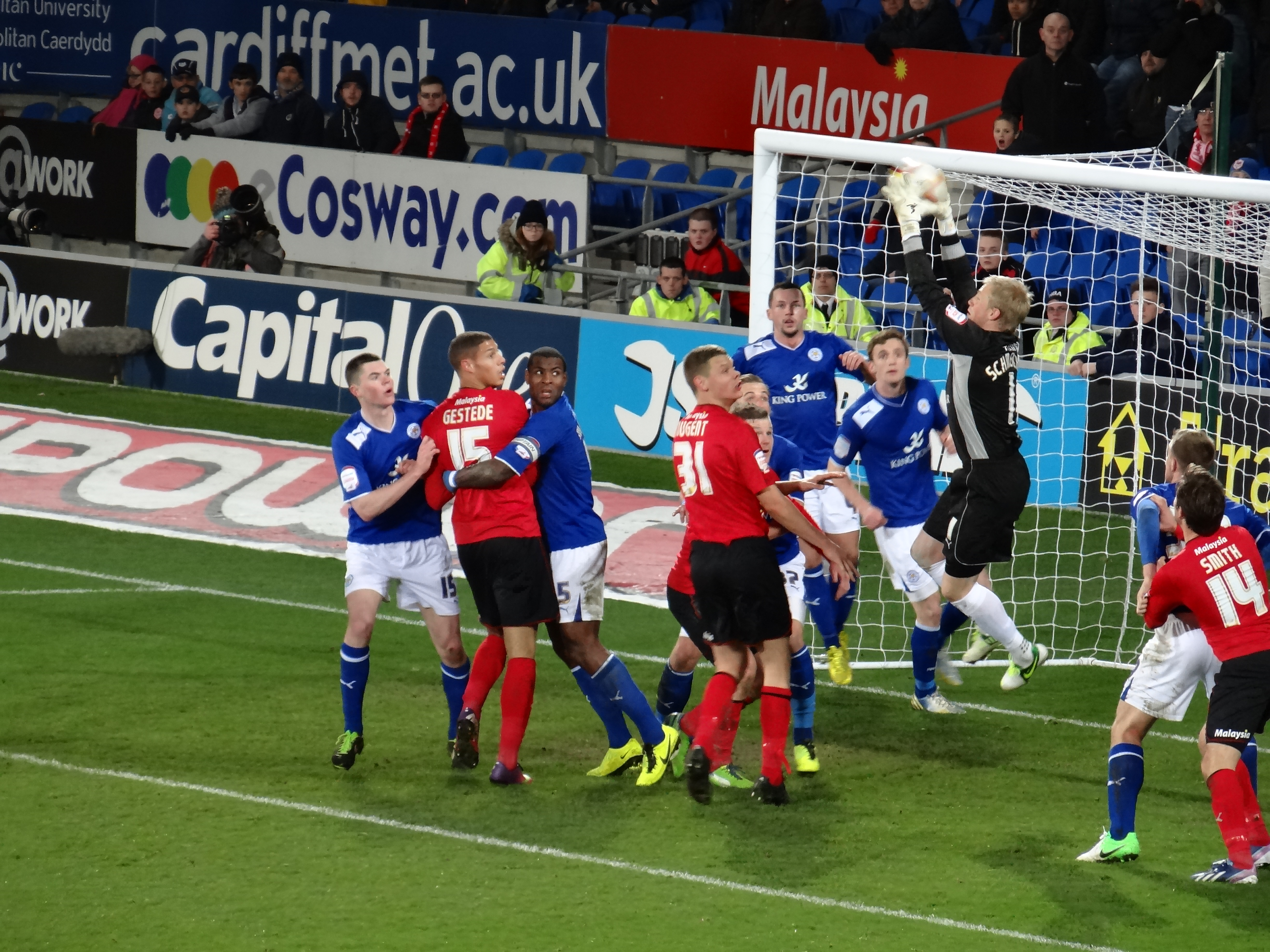
Schmeichel making a save during a match against Cardiff City in 2013

Schmeichel's form in the first half of the 2012–13 season surpassed that of the previous season, keeping 12 clean sheets in 28 games, the most in the league as the Foxes sat second in the table, such performances earning him links with La Liga giants Real Madrid and also leading to his first senior Denmark cap. A particular highlight was a spectacular save against Blackburn Rovers in February. On 16 April 2013, he made his 100th Leicester appearance in a 3–2 win over Bolton Wanderers. Schmeichel's performances earned him a place in the 2012–13 Championship PFA Team of the Year, alongside club captain Wes Morgan.

==== 2013–14 season ====
During the 2013–14 season, Schmeichel kept nine clean sheets during a 19-game unbeaten run spanning from December to April to help guarantee Leicester promotion from the Championship with six games to spare. Schmeichel's high quality performances once again led to him being courted by some of world football's giants, with both Manchester United and Milan being linked with moves for the Danish international during the January transfer window.

In March, TV footage appeared to support Schmeichel's claim that he had scored what would have been the first goal of his career, when Leicester equalised, in injury time, against Yeovil Town. However, the match officials ruled that his header had not crossed the line and the goal was officially credited to Chris Wood, who followed up to put the ball in the net.

At the end of the 2013–14 season, it was announced that Schmeichel had signed a four-year contract extension until the summer of 2018 with Leicester.

==== 2014–15 season ====
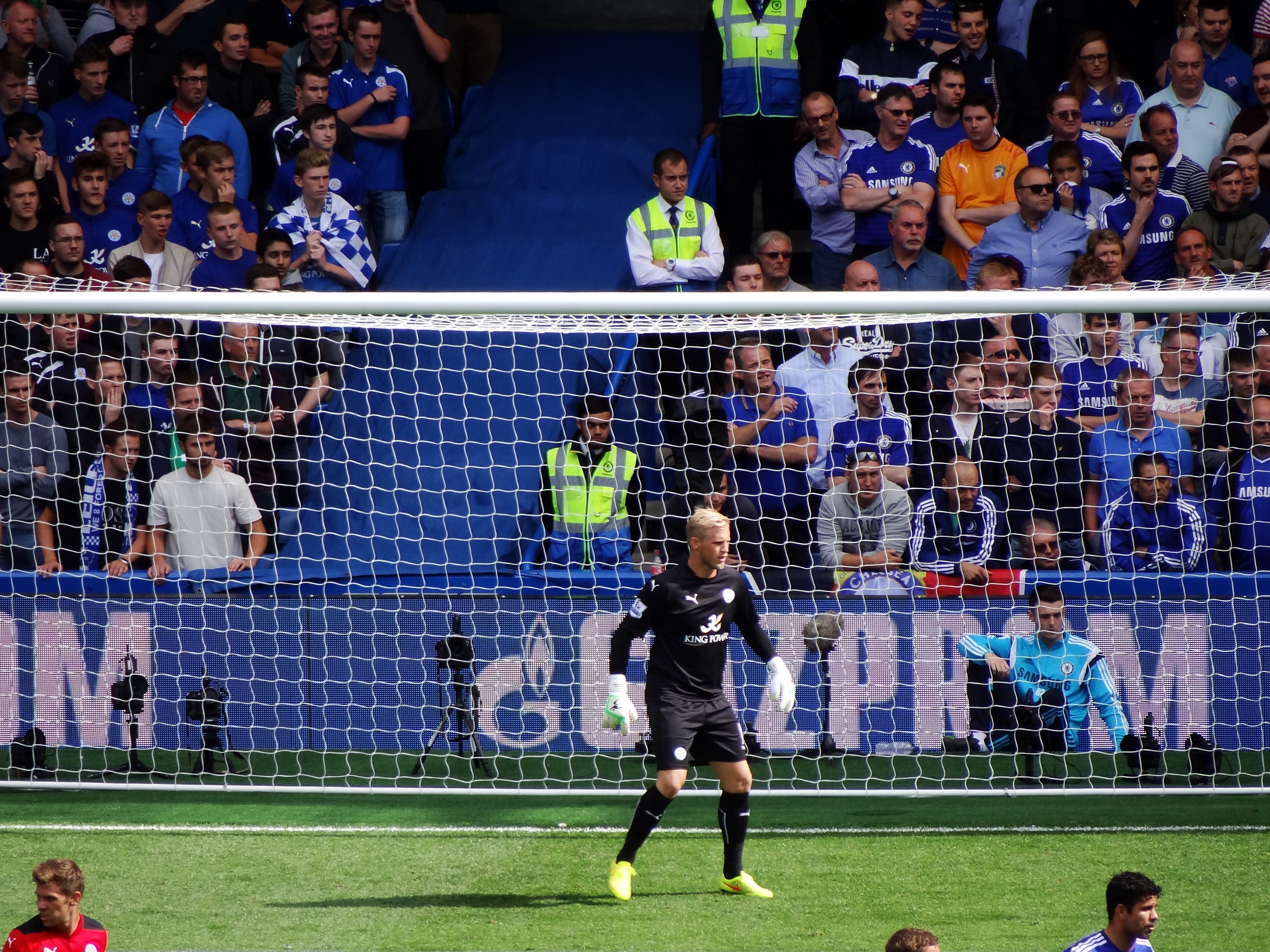
Schmeichel playing for Leicester City in 2014

Schmeichel remained the first choice goalkeeper for Leicester's return to the Premier League, including playing the full 90 minutes in the 5–3 victory against Manchester United on 21 September 2014. In December 2014, Schmeichel suffered a broken metatarsal in training, ruling him out for what was thought at the time to be up to six weeks. While he was out, Leicester signed goalkeeper Mark Schwarzer as a replacement. Schmeichel eventually returned from injury three months later on 21 March 2015, and beat Schwarzer to play in the 4–3 defeat to Tottenham Hotspur. Clean sheets against Swansea City and Burnley as Leicester won four out of five games in April earned Schmeichel a nomination for the Premier League Player of the Month award. After securing Premier League safety following a goalless draw with Sunderland on 16 May, Schmeichel stated his belief that manager Nigel Pearson should win Manager of the Season and that Pearson is the best manager Schmeichel has played for. Pearson, however, was sacked in the off-season.

==== 2015–16 season ====
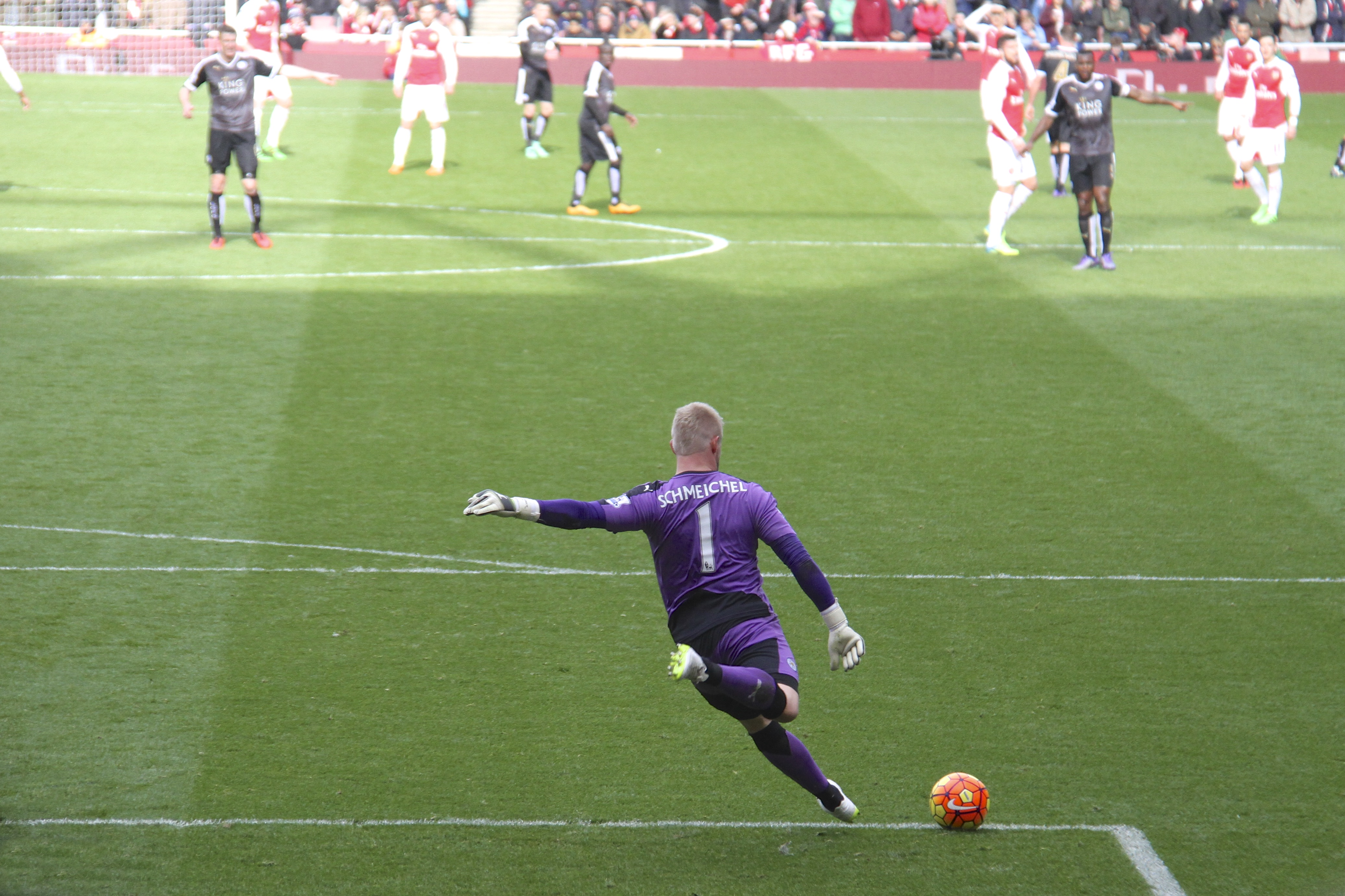
Schmeichel taking a goal kick for Leicester City in 2016

Under Pearson's replacement, Claudio Ranieri, Leicester sat top of the table on Christmas Day. Despite their great start, the team did not keep a clean sheet in their first nine games, prompting Ranieri to offer to buy the squad pizza for their first. The team finally managed their first clean sheet of the season in their tenth game, against Crystal Palace. The team improved defensively, and Schmeichel kept his 12th clean sheet of the season in the reverse fixture against Palace on 19 March. On 2 May 2016, he won the Premier League title at 29 years of age, the same age and same calendar day when his father won Manchester United's first such title in 1993. On both occasions, the respective teams (Manchester United and Leicester City) clinched the titles by nearest rivals (Aston Villa and Tottenham Hotspur) not winning. The Schmeichels became the only biological father and son to have both won the Premier League, as well as doing so playing in the same position.

==== 2016–17 season ====
Despite rumours of a move away after playing a crucial role in Leicester City's title in the 2015–16 season, on 6 August 2016, Schmeichel signed a new five-year contract until 2021. Schmeichel made his first appearance of the season in FA Community Shield against the FA Cup winners, Manchester United, and the match ended in a 2–1 defeat for the reigning champions. At the opening of the Premier League, Schmeichel continued his role in the goal ahead of new signing, Ron-Robert Zieler against newly promoted Hull City. Schmeichel was beaten twice as Hull City went on to beat the champions 2–1. After missing three games in September, including a midweek EFL Cup tie against Chelsea, with a minor groin injury, Schmeichel sustained a hand fracture in the first half of a Champions League match against Copenhagen on 2 November. Despite the injury, Schmeichel finished the game, seeing out a 0–0 draw by making a late save of Andreas Cornelius for his fourth Champions League clean sheet in four matches. After undergoing surgery two days later, Schmeichel was expected to miss six weeks of action, with Zieler taking his place in goal.

On 24 February 2017, reports emerged alleging that Schmeichel was among several teammates who met with chairman Vichai Srivaddhanaprabha following their 2–1 Champions League defeat at Sevilla on 22 February, which led to manager Claudio Ranieri being sacked. Schmeichel denied the claims, describing them as "very hurtful".

In Leicester's first Champions League campaign, Schmeichel saved a penalty in each leg of the last 16 tie with Sevilla – from Joaquín Correa and Steven Nzonzi respectively – as the Foxes advanced 3–2 on aggregate.

==== 2017–18 season ====
On 26 August 2017, Schmeichel saved a Romelu Lukaku penalty away at Manchester United in the 53rd minute, with the score at 0–0. Leicester would go on to lose the game 2–0. On 31 March 2018, Schmeichel saved a penalty kick in a 2–0 away win over Brighton, the same number his father saved during his time in the competition (three out of 21 Premier League penalties saved). On 14 April 2018, Schmeichel suffered an ankle injury in the 86th minute in a 2–1 home loss against Burnley, resulting in Schmeichel missing Leicester's final five games of the 2017–18 Premier League season.

==== 2018–19 season ====
On 31 August 2018, Schmeichel signed a new contract with Leicester until June 2023. Schmeichel witnessed the helicopter crash on 27 October 2018 that killed five people including Leicester owner Vichai Srivaddhanaprabha. Schmeichel went on to play in every Premier League game for Leicester, making his 300th league appearance for the club and helping them to a 9th-place finish.

==== 2019–20 season ====
Schmeichel played in all 38 Premier League matches, in which he kept 13 clean sheets. Leicester City finished in fifth place and qualified for the next Europa League season.

==== 2020–21 season ====
On 15 May 2021, Schmeichel captained Leicester City to victory over Chelsea 1–0 in the FA Cup Final to win the competition for the first time in their history, the match featuring two saves by Schmeichel that greatly contributed to his team's triumph.

==== 2021–22 season ====
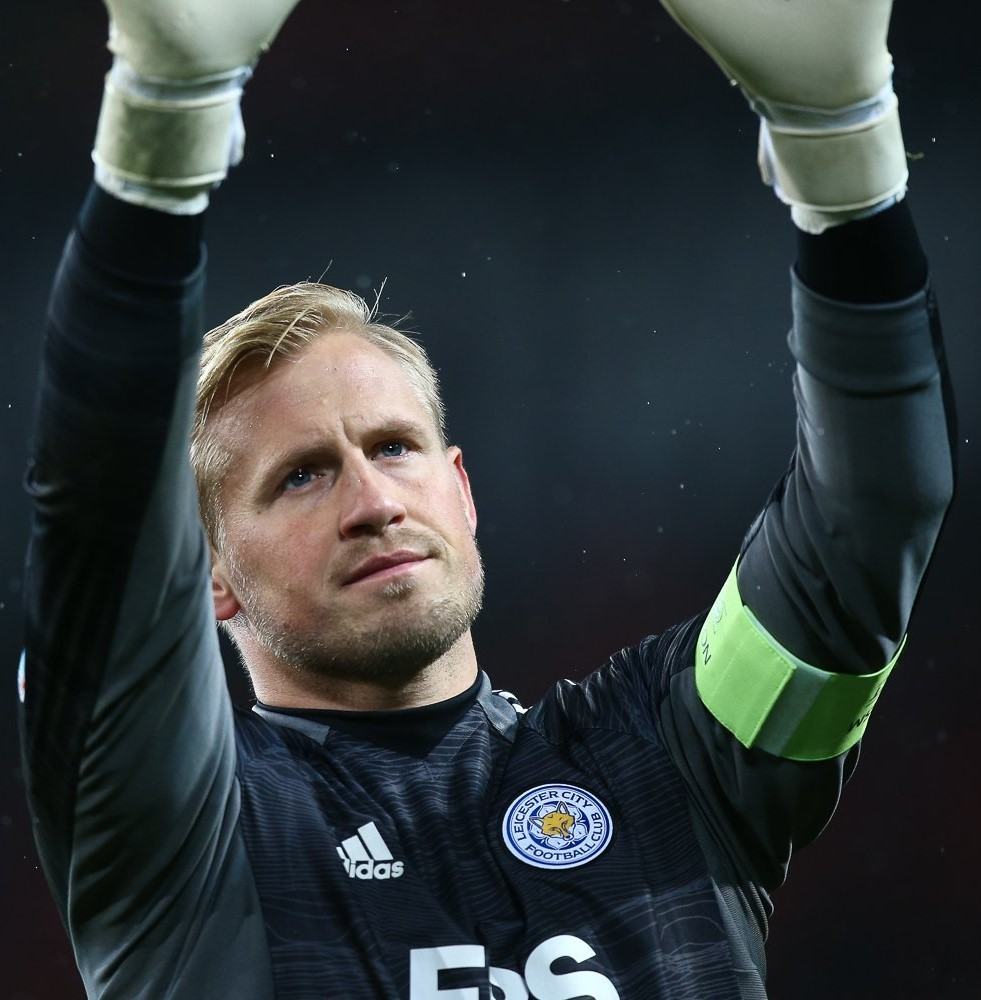
Schmeichel with Leicester City in 2021

On 7 August 2021, Schmeichel captained Leicester City to a 1–0 victory over Manchester City in the 2021 FA Community Shield to win the competition for the second time in their history. Schmeichel also captained Leicester City to the club's first European semi final after being knocked out by Jose Mourinho's Roma in the UEFA Europa Conference League.

=== Nice ===
On 3 August 2022, Schmeichel signed a three-year contract with Ligue 1 club Nice. On 14 August, he made his debut for the club in a 1–1 draw against Strasbourg.

On 1 September 2023, his contract with the club was terminated by mutual consent.

=== Anderlecht ===
On 5 September 2023, Schmeichel signed a one-year contract with Belgian Pro League club Anderlecht. On 24 September, Schmeichel made his debut in a match against Anderlecht's rivals Club Brugge, the game ended 1–1.

On 16 July 2024, he announced he would be leaving the club on a free transfer after one season, playing 31 games for the Mauves. He stated he was thankful for his time at the club, saying: "I will always remember my memories and my friendships made here."

=== Celtic ===
On 18 July 2024, Schmeichel signed for Scottish Premiership club Celtic on a one-year contract, with an option to extend for a further twelve months, replacing his friend and former Manchester City teammate Joe Hart as Celtic's number 1 following Hart's retirement. His arrival meant that he would reunite with his former manager at Leicester City Brendan Rodgers. On 4 August, he made his competitive debut for the club, keeping a clean sheet in a 4–0 league win against Kilmarnock. In September, he earned his fifth clean sheet in a row, when Celtic beat Hearts 2–0, equalling a record from 1906 for most consecutive clean sheets in top-flight football in Scotland.

In December, he won the Scottish League Cup with Celtic by winning the final against rivals Rangers. He saved an important penalty during the penalty shootout that helped Celtic earn the win.

On 22 January 2025, Celtic extended Schmeichel's contract for another year; until the summer of 2026. On 26 April, Celtic were confirmed as Premiership champions after a 5–0 victory over Dundee United at Tannadice Park, a match Schmeichel missed through injury.

During the 2025–26 season, Schmeichel made a series of errors that led to goals. He played what turned out to be his final game for the club on 22 February 2026, a 2–1 defeat to Hibernian at Celtic Park. In March, Schmeichel announced that he would require surgery on a shoulder injury sustained a year earlier, which was expected to keep him out for up to a year.

On 27 May 2026, Schmeichel announced his retirement from professional football because of the injury.

== International career ==
=== Youth ===
While at Manchester City, Schmeichel was called up for the Denmark national under-19 team in August 2004, and made his international debut in a 0–0 draw with Northern Ireland on 2 September 2004. He went on to play eight under-19 internationals until March 2005, competing with Kenneth Stenild and Michael Tørnes for the goalkeeping spot. He was called up for the under-20 team in October 2005, but did not play for the team until October 2006, during his time at Bury. The day after his under-20 debut, Schmeichel was asked to train with the senior Denmark team and was called up as a replacement for injured Theis Rasmussen in the under-21 squad.

Schmeichel was one of the leading players in the team, and was named Danish under-21 Talent of the Year in November 2007, following three clean sheets in the previous four under-21 games. He played a total 17 under-21 internationals in a row from March 2007 to October 2008, racking up seven clean sheets.

=== Senior ===
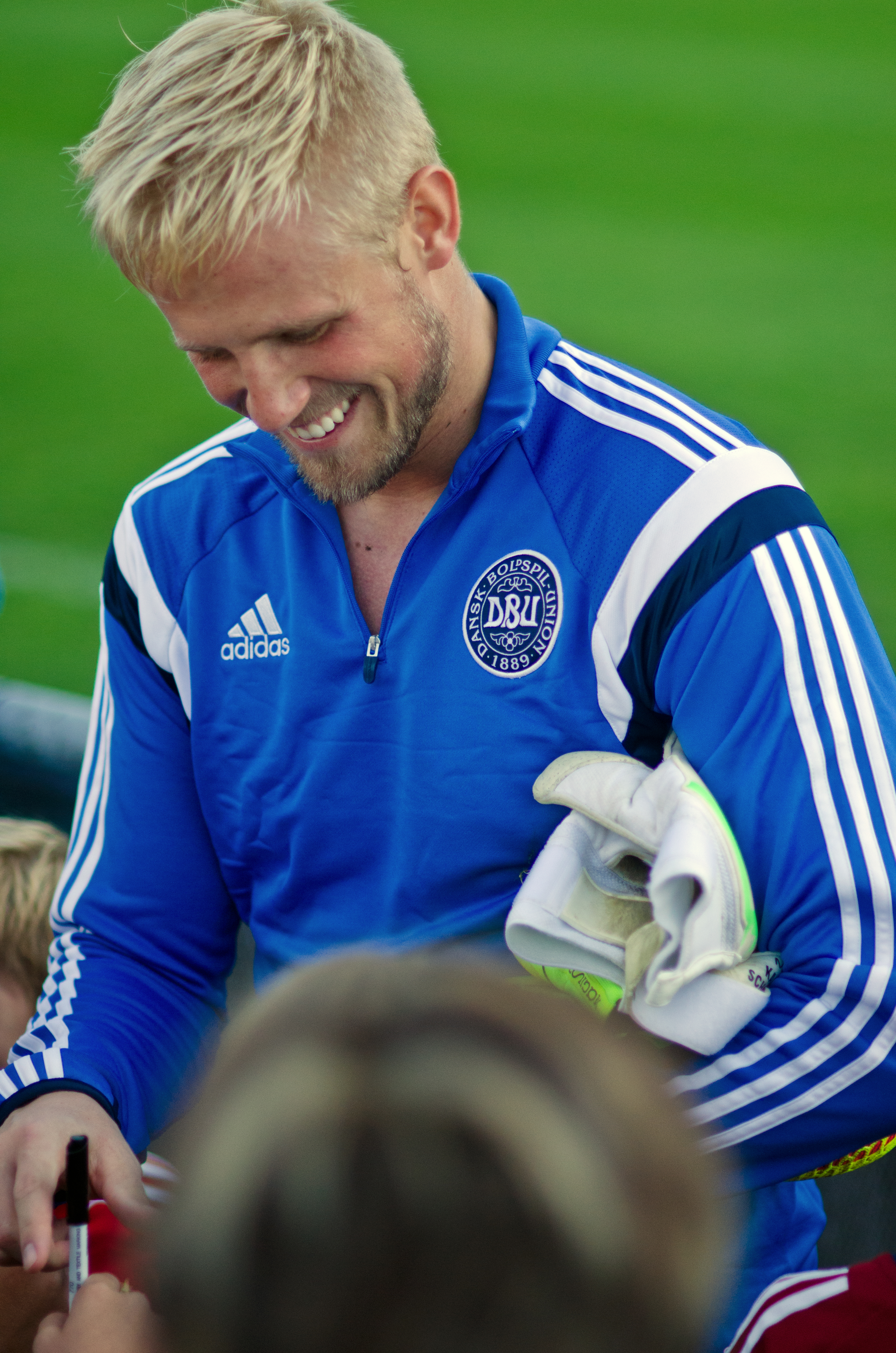
Schmeichel signing autographs during a training session with Denmark in 2014

Following his strong showings for Manchester City in the early 2007–08 season, it was reported on 23 August 2007 that The Football Association (FA) were investigating Schmeichel's international status, to see if there was any chance of him foregoing his Danish international status in order to play for England. Schmeichel, however, stated that he would only ever play for Denmark.

Schmeichel was called up to the Danish senior team on 13 May 2011 for the first time for the match against Iceland, but remained an unused substitute. On 29 May 2012, he was called up for UEFA Euro 2012 as a third goalkeeper after it became clear that Thomas Sørensen would miss the tournament due to an injury sustained against Brazil. Schmeichel made his senior debut in a 3–0 friendly match defeat to Macedonia at the Philip II Arena on 6 February 2013.

On 15 October 2013, Schmeichel had his first ever senior level game in his native Denmark, when he held an easy clean sheet in Denmark's 6–0 win against Malta in the last 2014 FIFA World Cup qualifier. Denmark were eventually runners-up in the group, finishing six points behind Italy, but they did not progress to the play-offs for the finals as they were the lowest-ranked team of the nine runners-up.

On 5 March 2014, Schmeichel received his third cap for Denmark in their 1–0 friendly defeat against England at Wembley Stadium. Despite defeat, Schmeichel pulled off a string of impressive saves earning plaudits from the media as well as England manager Roy Hodgson.

Schmeichel was selected for the Danish squad for the 2018 FIFA World Cup, where he started in three group stage matches. His clean sheet in the opening match contributed to a Man of the Match award and helped Schmeichel set a new record for minutes without conceding a goal for Denmark, surpassing his father's record. During the Round of 16 match against Croatia, Schmeichel was named Man of the Match after saving a penalty-kick taken by Luka Modrić in extra-time and two penalties during the subsequent shootout, although his opposing counterpart Danijel Subašić saved three penalties in that shootout to eliminate Denmark.

On 7 July 2021, in the semi-finals of UEFA Euro 2020 against England at Wembley Stadium, Schmeichel saved a penalty from Harry Kane in extra-time, who subsequently scored from the rebound, which proved to be the decisive goal as England prevailed 2–1. In November 2022, he was named in the 26-man squad for the 2022 FIFA World Cup in Qatar. On 23 March 2024, he earned his 100th international cap in a friendly match against Switzerland.

He made what turned out to be his final international appearance in Denmark's 4–2 defeat to Scotland on 18 November 2025, which ended with him being lobbed from the halfway line by Kenny McLean. On 27 May 2026, Schmeichel ended his international football career due to his shoulder injury.

== Personal life ==
Schmeichel is married to Stine Gyldenbrand. Together, they have three children: a son born in 2010, a daughter born in 2012 and a second daughter born in 2021.

He is the son of Peter Schmeichel, a Danish former professional footballer who also played as a goalkeeper on the Danish national team, and during eight seasons at English club Manchester United where he won 15 trophies.

== Career statistics ==
=== Club ===
Appearances and goals by club, season and competition
Club	Season	League			National cup (Note: Includes Scottish Cup, FA Cup, Coupe de France, Belgian Cup)		League cup (Note: Includes Scottish League Cup, Football League/EFL Cup)		Europe		Other		Total	
Club	Season	Division	Apps	Goals	Apps	Goals	Apps	Goals	Apps	Goals	Apps	Goals	Apps	Goals
Manchester City	2005–06	Premier League	0	0	0	0	0	0	—		—		0	0
Manchester City	2006–07	Premier League	0	0	—		—		—		—		0	0
Manchester City	2007–08	Premier League	7	0	0	0	0	0	—		—		7	0
Manchester City	2008–09	Premier League	1	0	0	0	1	0	1 (Note: Appearance in UEFA Cup)	0	—		3	0
Manchester City	Total		8	0	0	0	1	0	1	0	—		10	0
Darlington (loan)	2005–06	League Two	4	0	—		—		—		—		4	0
Bury (loan)	2005–06	League Two	15	0	—		—		—		—		15	0
Bury (loan)	2006–07	League Two	14	0	0	0	0	0	—		0	0	14	0
Bury (loan)	Total		29	0	0	0	0	0	—		0	0	29	0
Falkirk (loan)	2006–07	Scottish Premier League	15	0	1	0	1	0	—		—		17	0
Cardiff City (loan)	2007–08	Championship	14	0	—		0	0	—		—		14	0
Coventry City (loan)	2007–08	Championship	9	0	—		—		—		—		9	0
Notts County	2009–10	League Two	43	0	5	0	0	0	—		1 (Note: Appearance in Football League Trophy)	0	49	0
Leeds United	2010–11	Championship	37	0	2	0	1	0	—		—		40	0
Leicester City	2011–12	Championship	46	0	5	0	1	0	—		—		52	0
Leicester City	2012–13	Championship	46	0	3	0	2	0	—		2 (Note: Appearances in Championship play-offs)	0	53	0
Leicester City	2013–14	Championship	46	0	1	0	4	0	—		—		51	0
Leicester City	2014–15	Premier League	24	0	0	0	0	0	—		—		24	0
Leicester City	2015–16	Premier League	38	0	2	0	0	0	—		—		40	0
Leicester City	2016–17	Premier League	30	0	2	0	0	0	8 (Note: Appearances in UEFA Champions League)	0	1 (Note: Appearance in FA Community Shield)	0	41	0
Leicester City	2017–18	Premier League	33	0	2	0	0	0	—		—		35	0
Leicester City	2018–19	Premier League	38	0	0	0	0	0	—		—		38	0
Leicester City	2019–20	Premier League	38	0	2	0	4	0	—		—		44	0
Leicester City	2020–21	Premier League	38	0	4	0	0	0	6 (Note: Appearances in UEFA Europa League)	0	—		48	0
Leicester City	2021–22	Premier League	37	0	0	0	1	0	14 (Note: Six appearances in UEFA Europa League, eight appearances in UEFA Europa Conference League)	0	1	0	53	0
Leicester City	Total		414	0	21	0	12	0	28	0	4	0	479	0
Nice	2022–23	Ligue 1	36	0	1	0	—		9 (Note: Appearances in UEFA Europa Conference League)	0	—		46	0
Anderlecht	2023–24	Belgian Pro League	31	0	1	0	—		—		—		32	0
Celtic	2024–25	Scottish Premiership	32	0	3	0	4	0	10	0	—		49	0
Celtic	2025–26	Scottish Premiership	26	0	0	0	2	0	11 (Note: Two appearances in UEFA Champions League, nine appearances in UEFA Europa League)	0	—		39	0
Celtic	Total		58	0	3	0	6	0	21	0	—		88	0
Career total			698	0	34	0	21	0	59	0	5	0	817	0

=== International ===
Appearances and goals by national team and year
National team	Year	Apps	Goals
Denmark	2013	2	0
Denmark	2014	7	0
Denmark	2015	9	0
Denmark	2016	6	0
Denmark	2017	7	0
Denmark	2018	12	0
Denmark	2019	10	0
Denmark	2020	7	0
Denmark	2021	18	0
Denmark	2022	11	0
Denmark	2023	10	0
Denmark	2024	12	0
Denmark	2025	9	0
Total		120	0

== Honours ==
Notts County

- Football League Two: 2009–10

Leicester City

- Premier League: 2015–16
- FA Cup: 2020–21
- FA Community Shield: 2021
- Football League Championship: 2013–14

Celtic

- Scottish Premiership: 2024–25, 2025–26
- Scottish League Cup: 2024–25

Individual

- Danish Football Player of the Year: 2016, 2019, 2020
- Danish Football Association's Award: 2015
- The Football League Team of the Decade
- PFA Team of the Year: 2009–10 League Two, 2012–13 Championship, 2013–14 Championship
- PFA Fans' Player of the Year: 2009–10 League Two
- Football League Two Golden Glove: 2009–10
- Leicester City Player of the Season: 2011–12, 2016–17
- Leicester City Player's Player of the Season: 2011–12, 2016–17
- Leicester City Supporters' Club Player of the Season: 2011–12
- PFA Scotland Team of the Year (Premiership): 2024–25

== See also ==
- List of men's footballers with 100 or more international caps
- List of European association football families
- List of Danish sportspeople
