= Elliott Chamberlain =

Welsh footballer

Personal information
- Date of birth: 29 April 1992 (age 34)
- Place of birth: Paget, Bermuda
- Position: Forward

Team information
- Current team: Barlestone St Giles

Senior career*
| Years | Team | Apps | (Gls) |
| 2011–2012 | Leicester City | 0 | (0) |
| 2011 | → Stockport County (loan) | 5 | (0) |
| 2011 | → AFC Telford United (loan) | 2 | (0) |
| 2012–2014 | Exeter City | 4 | (0) |
| 2012 | → Bath City (loan) | 11 | (3) |
| 2013 | → Bath City (loan) | 1 | (0) |
| 2014 | Gloucester City | 3 | (0) |
| 2014–2015 | Corby Town | 32 | (7) |
| 2015–2016 | Barwell | | |
| 2016– | Barlestone St Giles | | |

International career
- Wales U17
| 2010–2011 | Wales U19 | 6 | (2) |
| 2009–2012 | Wales U21 | 9 | (1) |
- * Club domestic league appearances and goals as of 23:00, 9 January 2020 (UTC)

Elliott C. Chamberlain (born 29 April 1992) is a Welsh footballer who plays for Leicestershire Senior League Premier Division side Barlestone St Giles, where he plays as a forward.

== Playing career ==
Born in Paget, Bermuda, Chamberlain has played club football for Leicester City, Stockport County, AFC Telford United, Exeter City, and Bath City.

He was released by Exeter at the end of the 2013–14 season. He subsequently signed for Gloucester City for the 2014–15 season, and Corby Town for the 2014–15 season. making 32 appearances and scoring 7 goals. Chamberlain signed for Barwell for the 2015–16 season. Following his departure from Barwell, Chamberlain moved to Leicestershire based team Barlestone St Giles.

== International career ==
Chamberlain has represented Wales at the U17, U19 and U21 international level.
