= Kolarov =

Kolarov (Cyrillic: Коларов, Serbian pronunciation: [kɔlǎrɔʋ]) is a Bulgarian and Serbian surname, an occupational surname derived from kolar, meaning "wheelwright". Notable people with the surname include:

- Aleksandar Kolarov (born 1985), Serbian footballer
- Atanas Kolarov (born 1934), Bulgarian chess player
- Bojil Kolarov (born 1972), Bulgarian writer and historian
- Nelko Kolarov (born 1959), Bulgarian composer
- Nikola Kolarov (born 1983), Serbian footballer
- Vasil Kolarov (1877–1950), Bulgarian politician
