= 2013–14 Leicester City F.C. season =

109th season in existence of Leicester City

Leicester City
2013–14 season
- Chairman: Vichai Srivaddhanaprabha
- Manager: Nigel Pearson
- Stadium: King Power Stadium
- Championship: 1st
- FA Cup: Third Round
- League Cup: Fifth Round
- Top goalscorer: League: David Nugent (20); All: David Nugent (22)
- Highest home attendance: 31,424 vs. Doncaster Rovers (Championship, 3 May 2014)
- Lowest home attendance: 14,043 vs. Derby County (League Cup, 24 September 2013)
Home colours	Away colours

The 2013–14 season was Leicester City F.C.'s 109th season in the English football league system and their 62nd (overall) season in the second tier of English football. They were playing their fifth consecutive season in the Football League Championship.

The season saw Leicester win their seventh second tier title, equalling the record for the most second tier titles set by Manchester City after leading the table since Boxing Day and comfortably earning promotion with six games to spare, before winning the title with two games to spare.

Along the way, they broke several club records including most points in a single season (102), most league wins in a single season (31), most league home wins in a single season (17), the most consecutive league wins (9), the most consecutive away league wins (5), the longest unbeaten run away from home in the league (13) and the most consecutive league games scored in (31) (the latter two records continued on to the following season).

== Pre-season events ==
Note: This section does not include close season transfers or pre-season match results, which are listed in their own sections below.

- 1 June 2013 – Joseph Dodoo signed a professional contract until 2015.
- 13 June 2013 – Conrad Logan signed a 2-year contract extension until 2015.

== Kit and sponsorship ==
The Leicester City home kit for the 2013–14 season was unveiled on 6 July 2013. It is the second kit made under the PUMA brand. The kit features a blue shirt, white shorts and blue socks with a metallic gold trim.

== Friendlies ==
Win Draw Loss Upcoming fixture

12 July 2013	Leamington	0–2	Leicester City	Leamington Spa
19:00 BST		Report	Wood 61'; Waghorn 70'	Stadium: New Windmill Ground; Attendance: 1,002

20 July 2013	Ilkeston	0–0	Leicester City XI	Ilkeston
15:00 BST		Report		Stadium: New Manor Ground; Attendance: 452

23 July 2013	Port Vale	0–1	Leicester City	Stoke-on-Trent
19:30 BST		Report	Waghorn 15'	Stadium: Vale Park; Attendance: 1,894

24 July 2013	York City	0–0	Leicester City	York
19:45 BST		Report		Stadium: Bootham Crescent; Attendance: 1,564; Referee: Ross Joyce

27 July 2013	Corby Town	2–3	Leicester City XI	Corby
15:00 BST	Viera 24'; Shariff 44'	Report	Dodoo 2'; Futács 10'; Panayiotou 90'	Stadium: Steel Park; Attendance: 262

27 July 2013	Leicester City	0–3	AS Monaco	Leicester
16:15 BST		Report	Kurzawa 7'; Falcao 40'; Tisserand 85'	Stadium: King Power Stadium; Attendance: 10,633; Referee: Kevin Friend

30 July 2013	Northampton Town	2–1	Leicester City	Northampton
19:45 BST	Collins 13'; St Ledger 90' (o.g.)	Report	Wood 20'	Stadium: Sixfields Stadium; Attendance: 1,812; Referee: Dean Whitestone

31 July 2013	Coalville Town	3–1	Leicester City XI	Coalville
19:45 BST	Piggon 19'; Stuart 38'; MacAteer 48'	Report	Paratore 58'	Stadium: Owen Street Sports Ground; Attendance: 372

== Events ==
Note:This section does not include transfers or match results, which are listed in their own sections below.

- 2 September 2013 – Wes Morgan is called up to play for Jamaica for the first time.
- 16 January 2014 – Wes Morgan signs a one-year contract extension until the summer of 2015.
- 25 January 2014 – Paul Konchesky signs a one-year contract extension until the summer of 2015.
- 8 May 2014 – Gary Taylor-Fletcher signs a one-year contract extension until the summer of 2015.
- 22 May 2014 – Marcin Wasilewski signs a one-year contract extension until the summer of 2015.
- 30 May 2014 – Tom Hopper signs a two-year contract extension until the summer of 2016.
- 31 May 2014 – Riyad Mahrez plays for Algeria for the first time.
- 2 June 2014 – Jacob Blyth signs a two-year contract extension until the summer of 2016.
- 2 June 2014 – James Pearson signs a one-year contract extension until the summer of 2015.
- 4 June 2014 – Kasper Schmeichel signs a four-year contract extension until the summer of 2018.
- 15 June 2014 – Danny Drinkwater signs a four-year contract extension until the summer of 2018.
- 19 June 2014 – Jak McCourt signs a one-year contract extension until the summer of 2015.
- 25 June 2014 – Nigel Pearson signs a three-year contract extension until the summer of 2017.
- 27 June 2014 – Michael Barrington signs a one-year contract extension until the summer of 2015.
- 27 June 2014 – Adam Smith signs a two-year contract extension until the summer of 2016.
- 27 June 2014 – Ryan Watson signs a two-year contract extension until the summer of 2016.

== Players and staff ==
=== 2013–14 squad ===
- This section lists players who were in Leicester's first team squad at any point during the 2013–14 season
- Asterisks indicates player left mid-season
- Hash symbol indicates player retired mid-season
- Italics indicate loan player

No.	Nationality	Name	Position	Joined	Signed from
Goalkeepers
1	(Denmark)	Kasper Schmeichel	GK	2011	(England) Leeds United
25	(Republic of Ireland)	Conrad Logan	GK	2004	Youth
31	(England)	Adam Smith	GK	2010	(England) Middlesbrough
Defenders
2	(Belgium)	Ritchie De Laet	RB	2012	(England) Manchester United
3	(England)	Paul Konchesky	LB	2011	(England) Liverpool
5	(Jamaica)	Wes Morgan	CB	2012	(England) Nottingham Forest
6	(United States)	Zak Whitbread	CB	2012	(England) Norwich City
12	(Republic of Ireland)	Sean St Ledger	CB	2011	(England) Preston North End
15	(Ghana)	Jeff Schlupp	LB / CF / LW	2010	Youth
18	(England)	Liam Moore	CB / RB	2011	Youth
21	(Ivory Coast)	Zoumana Bakayogo	LB	2013	(England) Tranmere Rovers
23	(Spain)	Ignasi Miquel	CB	Loan	(England) Arsenal
27	(Poland)	Marcin Wasilewski	CB / RB	2013	Unattached
Midfielders
4	(England)	Danny Drinkwater	CM	2012	(England) Manchester United
7	(England)	Ben Marshall*	RW / LW / AM	2012	(England) Stoke City
7	(England)	Dean Hammond	CM	2013	(England) Southampton
8	(England)	Matty James	CM	2012	(England) Manchester United
10	(Wales)	Andy King	CM	2006	Youth
11	(England)	Lloyd Dyer	LW / RW	2008	(England) Milton Keynes Dons
16	(England)	Neil Danns	CM / RW	2011	(England) Crystal Palace
24	(France)	Anthony Knockaert	AM / LW / RW	2012	(France) Guingamp
26	(Algeria)	Riyad Mahrez	LW / RW	2014	(France) Le Havre
Forwards
9	(England)	Jamie Vardy	CF	2012	(England) Fleetwood Town
14	(England)	Martyn Waghorn*	CF	2010	(England) Sunderland
17	(Scotland)	Paul Gallagher	AM / RW / CF	2009	(England) Blackburn Rovers
20	(England)	Tom Hopper	CF	2011	Youth
22	(England)	Gary Taylor-Fletcher	CF	2013	Unattached
28	(England)	Kevin Phillips	CF	2014	Unattached
29	(Hungary)	Márkó Futács	CF	2012	(England) Portsmouth
35	(England)	David Nugent	CF / LW	2011	Unattached
39	(New Zealand)	Chris Wood	CF	2013	(England) West Bromwich Albion

=== 2013–14 backroom staff ===
- This section lists members of staff who were in Leicester's first team squad at any point during the 2013–14 season
- Asterisks indicate member of staff left mid-season

Position	Nationality	Name
Manager	(England)	Nigel Pearson
Assistant Manager	(England)	Craig Shakespeare
Assistant Manager/Head of Recruitment	(England)	Steve Walsh
First Team Coach/Goalkeeping Coach	(England)	Mike Stowell
Head Physio	(England)	David Rennie
Academy Manager	(England)	Jon Rudkin
Academy Coach (Under 18s)	(England)	Steve Beaglehole
Academy Coach (Under 16s)	(England)	Trevor Peake

== Transfers ==
=== In ===
Date	Position	Nationality	Name	From	Fee
22 July 2013	LB	(Ivory Coast)	Zoumana Bakayogo	(England) Tranmere Rovers	Free
31 August 2013	CM	(England)	Dean Hammond	(England) Southampton	Undisclosed
16 September 2013	CM	(England)	Ryan Watson	(England) Wigan Athletic	Free
17 September 2013	CB	(Poland)	Marcin Wasilewski	(Belgium) Anderlecht	Free
20 September 2013	CF	(England)	Gary Taylor-Fletcher	(England) Blackpool	Free
11 January 2014	RW	(Algeria)	Riyad Mahrez	(France) Le Havre	Undisclosed
15 January 2014	CF	(England)	Kevin Phillips	(England) Crystal Palace	Free

=== Out ===
Date	Position	Nationality	Name	To	Fee
26 June 2013	CB	(Northern Ireland)	Joey Jones	(England) Yeovil Town	Free
17 July 2013	CF	(Jamaica)	Jermaine Beckford	(England) Bolton Wanderers	Undisclosed
28 August 2013	RW	(England)	Ben Marshall	(England) Blackburn Rovers	Undisclosed
4 April 2014	CF	(England)	Martyn Waghorn	(England) Wigan Athletic	Undisclosed
3 May 2014	CF	(England)	Kevin Phillips	Retired	

=== Loans in ===
Date from	Date to	Position	Nationality	Name	From
9 August 2013	End of season	CB	(Spain)	Ignasi Miquel	(England) Arsenal
31 January 2014	End of season	GK	(England)	Luke Simpson	(England) Oldham Athletic

=== Loans out ===
Date from	Date to	Position	Nationality	Name	To
9 August 2013	9 September 2013	CF	(England)	Jacob Blyth	(England) Northampton Town
29 August 2013	29 September 2013	CB	(England)	George Taft	(England) York City
2 September 2013	End of season	CF	(Hungary)	Márkó Futács	(Hungary) Diósgyőri
12 September 2013	12 December 2013	CF	(England)	Martyn Waghorn	(England) Millwall
26 September 2013	End of Season	MF	(England)	Neil Danns	(England) Bolton Wanderers
30 September 2013	30 December 2013	CB	(United States)	Zak Whitbread	(England) Derby County
11 October 2013	11 November 2013	MF	(England)	Jak McCourt	(England) Torquay United
30 October 2013	End of Season	MF	(Scotland)	Paul Gallagher	(England) Preston North End
1 November 2013	1 December 2013	MF	(England)	Jamie Anton	(England) Ilkeston
6 November 2013	14 December 2013	CF	(England)	Jacob Blyth	(England) Northampton Town
11 January 2014	11 February 2014	GK	(England)	Adam Smith	(England) Stevenage
17 January 2014	17 February 2014	LB	(Ivory Coast)	Zoumana Bakayogo	(England) Yeovil Town
25 January 2014	End of Season	CB	(England)	Alie Sesay	(England) Colchester United
21 February 2014	21 March 2014	MF	(England)	Michael Cain	(England) Mansfield Town
11 March 2014	End of Season	CB	(England)	James Pearson	(England) Carlisle United
25 April 2014	22 May 2014	GK	(England)	Adam Smith	(England) Cambridge United

=== Released ===
Date	Position	Nationality	Name
–	GK	(Northern Ireland)	Conor Brennan
–	CB	(England)	Jide Maduako
–	CB	(Northern Ireland)	Steven Smith
–	CB	(England)	Karlton Watson
22 July 2013	CM	(England)	Richie Wellens
14 June 2014	CF	(Hungary)	Márkó Futács

== Results ==
Win Draw Loss Upcoming fixture

=== Football League Championship ===
3 August 2013 1	Middlesbrough	1–2	Leicester City	Middlesbrough
15:00 BST	St Ledger 35' (o.g.); Carayol (yellow card)	Report	Drinkwater 60'; Vardy 67'	Stadium: Riverside Stadium; Attendance: 17,223; Referee: Andrew Madley

11 August 2013 2	Leicester City	0–0	Leeds United	Leicester
16:30 BST	Whitbread (yellow card) 45+2'; Moore (yellow card) 81'; Knockaert (yellow card) 82'	Report	Pearce (yellow card) 13'	Stadium: King Power Stadium; Attendance: 22,725; Referee: Keith Stroud

18 August 2013 3	Derby County	0–1	Leicester City	Derby
15:00 BST	Freeman (yellow card) 90'	Report	James (yellow card) 24'; Grant 35' (o.g.); Moore (yellow card) 77'	Stadium: Pride Park Stadium; Attendance: 23,437; Referee: Robert Madley

24 August 2013 4	Leicester City	3–2	Birmingham City	Leicester
15:00 BST	Vardy 77'; King 82'; Nugent 90+3' (pen.)	Report	Green 12'; Bartley (yellow card) 90+2'; Burke 90+4'	Stadium: King Power Stadium; Attendance: 21,229; Referee: Eddie Ilderton

31 August 2013 5	Charlton Athletic	2–1	Leicester City	London
15:00 BST	Morrison 27'; Jackson (yellow card) 31'; Kermorgant 59'; Wiggins (yellow card) 79'; Pritchard (yellow card) 82'	Report	James (yellow card) 12' (yellow-red card) 52'; Miquel (yellow card) 26'; Drinkwater 61'; Knockaert (yellow card) 89'	Stadium: The Valley Stadium; Attendance: 15,542; Referee: Darren Deadman

14 September 2013 6	Leicester City	2–0	Wigan Athletic	Leicester
15:00 BST	Moore 15'; Nugent 81' (pen.)		Beausejour (yellow card) 57'; Watson (yellow card) 32'	Stadium: King Power Stadium; Attendance: 21,810; Referee: David Webb

17 September 2013 7	Leicester City	2–1	Blackburn Rovers	Leicester
19:45 BST	Dyer 16'; Nugent 45' (pen.); Drinkwater (yellow card) 59'	Report	Kean (yellow card) 45+1'; Evans (yellow card) 45+2'; Dann (yellow card) 50'; Rhodes 70' (pen.)	Stadium: King Power Stadium; Attendance: 19,135; Referee: Simon Hooper

21 September 2013 8	Blackpool	2–2	Leicester City	Blackpool
15:00 BST	Basham 19'; Ince 90' (pen.)	Report	Knockaert (yellow card) 48'; Konchesky 72' (pen.); King 74'	Stadium: Bloomfield Road; Attendance: 15,317; Referee: Scott Duncan

28 September 2013 9	Leicester City	2–1	Barnsley	Leicester
15:00 BST	Nugent 50', 62' (pen.)	Report	Butland (yellow card) 62'; Scotland 73'	Stadium: King Power Stadium; Attendance: 21,591; Referee: Phil Gibbs

1 October 2013 10	Yeovil Town	1–2	Leicester City	Yeovil
19:45 BST	Hayter 84' (pen.)	Report	Dyer 54'; Nugent 63' (pen.); De Laet (yellow card) 83'	Stadium: Huish Park; Attendance: 6,476; Referee: Brendan Malone

5 October 2013 11	Doncaster Rovers	1–0	Leicester City	Doncaster
15:00 BST	Schmeichel 17' (o.g.)	Report	Nugent (yellow card) 87'	Stadium: Keepmoat Stadium; Attendance: 10,003; Referee: Mark Heywood

19 October 2013 12	Leicester City	2–1	Huddersfield Town	Leicester
15:00 BST	Vardy 11' (yellow card) 90+1'; Gerrard 38' (o.g.)	Report	Scannell 68'; Clayton (yellow card) 73'; Vaughan (red card) 82'	Stadium: King Power Stadium; Attendance: 22,297 (917 away); Referee: James Adcock

26 October 2013 13	Leicester City	2–1	Bournemouth	Leicester
15:00 GMT	Nugent 18'; Vardy (yellow card) 63' (goal) 64'	Report	Ward (yellow card) 9' (yellow-red card) 66'; Pugh 38'; Daniels (yellow card) 45'	Stadium: King Power Stadium; Attendance: 23,357; Referee: Andy Davies

2 November 2013 14	Watford	0–3	Leicester City	Watford
12:15 GMT	Forestieri (yellow card) 36'; Ekstrand (yellow card) 77'	Report	Wood 10'; Knockaert 53' (yellow card) 53'; Dyer 86'	Stadium: Vicarage Road; Attendance: 16,011 (1,561 away); Referee: Roger East

9 November 2013 15	Leicester City	0–2	Nottingham Forest	Leicester
15:00 GMT	Wasilewski (yellow card) 8'; Knockaert (yellow card) 10'; Hammond (yellow card) 90+2'	Report	Cox 31'; Mackie 43'; Lascelles (yellow card) 45'; Cohen (yellow card) 84'	Stadium: King Power Stadium; Attendance: 30,416; Referee: Lee Mason

23 November 2013 16	Ipswich Town	1–2	Leicester City	Ipswich
15:00 GMT	McGoldrick 2'; Chambers (yellow card) 50'	Report	Nugent 51', 57'	Stadium: Portman Road; Attendance: 18,227; Referee: Oliver Langford

30 November 2013 17	Leicester City	3–0	Millwall	Leicester
15:00 GMT	Dyer 12'; Vardy (yellow card) 28' (goal) 52', 55'	Report	Malone (yellow card) 24'	Stadium: King Power Stadium; Attendance: 21,633; Referee: Andy Haines

3 December 2013 18	Sheffield Wednesday	2–1	Leicester City	Sheffield
19:45 GMT	Wickham 9', 25'; Mattock (yellow card) 45'	Report	Knockaert 2'	Stadium: Hillsborough; Attendance: 20,016; Referee: Mark Brown

7 December 2013 19	Brighton & Hove Albion	3–1	Leicester City	Brighton
15:00 GMT	Barnes 9', 77' (pen.); Conway 28'; Crofts (yellow card) 62'; LuaLua (yellow card) 90+1'	Report	King 64' (yellow card) 86'; Wasilewski (yellow card) 4'; Drinkwater (yellow card) 60'; Morgan (yellow card) 77'	Stadium: Amex Stadium; Attendance: 27,497; Referee: Bobby Madley

14 December 2013 20	Leicester City	1–1	Burnley	Leicester
12:15 GMT	Nugent 14' (pen.); De Laet (yellow card) 29'	Report	Ings 47'; Marney (yellow card) 82'	Stadium: King Power Stadium; Attendance: 23,143; Referee: Andy D'Urso

21 December 2013 21	Queens Park Rangers	0–1	Leicester City	London
12:15 GMT	O'Neil (yellow card) 25'; Assou-Ekotto (yellow card) 67'; Barton (yellow card) 84' (yellow-red card) 84'	Report	Vardy 41'; James (yellow card) 66'	Stadium: Loftus Road; Attendance: 17,173; Referee: Paul Tierney

26 December 2013 22	Leicester City	1–0	Reading	Leicester
15:00 GMT	Nugent 21' (pen.); Konchesky (yellow card) 68'	Report	Guthrie (yellow card) 36'; McAnuff (yellow card) 81'	Stadium: King Power Stadium; Attendance: 26,722; Referee: Michael Naylor

29 December 2013 23	Leicester City	5–3	Bolton Wanderers	Leicester
15:00 GMT	Drinkwater 5'; Knockaert 37'; Mills 41' (o.g.); De Laet (yellow card) 43'; Vardy (yellow card) 60'; Dyer 75'; Taylor-Fletcher 89'	Report	Moritz 14', 39'; Beckford 20'; Baptiste (yellow card) 33'; Knight (yellow card) 60'; Davies (yellow card) 73'	Stadium: King Power Stadium; Attendance: 26,614; Referee: Mike Russell

1 January 2014 24	Millwall	1–3	Leicester City	London
15:00 GMT	McDonald (yellow card) 15'; Chaplow 68'; Dunne (yellow card) 77'	Report	Knockaert 6'; Hammond (yellow card) 29'; Taylor-Fletcher (yellow card) 42'; Nugent 48'; Schlupp 90+3'	Stadium: The Den; Attendance: 10,014; Referee: Tim Robinson

10 January 2014 25	Leicester City	4–1	Derby County	Leicester
19:45 GMT	De Laet 25'; Nugent 48', 60' (pen.); Vardy 64'	Report	De Laet 59' (o.g.); Bryson (yellow card) 78'	Stadium: King Power Stadium; Attendance: 23,140; Referee: David Coote

18 January 2014 26	Leeds United	0–1	Leicester City	Leeds
12:15 GMT	Byram (yellow card) 78'	Report	Knockaert (yellow card) 47'; Morgan (yellow card) 48'; Vardy (yellow card) 69'; Nugent 88'	Stadium: Elland Road; Attendance: 22,678; Referee: Mike Dean

25 January 2014 27	Leicester City	2–0	Middlesbrough	Leicester
15:00 GMT	Vardy 52'; De Laet 73'	Report	Ayala (yellow card) 72'	Stadium: King Power Stadium; Attendance: 26,047; Referee: Steve Martin

28 January 2014 28	Birmingham City	1–2	Leicester City	Birmingham
19:45 GMT	Rusnák (yellow card) 73'; Løvenkrands 90'	Report	Dyer 24'; Vardy (yellow card) 38' (goal) 83'; Wasilewski (yellow card) 74'; Drinkwater (yellow card) 77'; De Laet (yellow card) 82'	Stadium: St Andrew's; Attendance: 14,763; Referee: Carl Boyeson

1 February 2014 29	Bournemouth	0–1	Leicester City	Bournemouth
15:00 GMT	Ward (yellow card) 53'; Arter (yellow card) 66'; Camp (yellow card) 81'	Report	Wasilewksi (yellow card) 67'; Phillips 81'	Stadium: Dean Court; Attendance: 10,719; Referee: Darren Drysdale

8 February 2014 30	Leicester City	2–2	Watford	Leicester
15:00 GMT	Konchesky (yellow card) 24'; James 43'; Drinkwater 90+4'	Report	Forestieri 9', (yellow card) 84'; Tőzsér (yellow card) 22'; Murray 41'; Cassetti (yellow card) 74'	Stadium: King Power Stadium; Attendance: 23,635; Referee: Martin Atkinson

19 February 2014 31	Nottingham Forest	2–2	Leicester City	Nottingham
19:45 GMT	Paterson 39'; Reid 43' (pen.); Fox (yellow card) 70'; Halford (yellow card) 81'	Report	Vardy 29'; Morgan (yellow card) 42'; Konchesky (red card) 62'; De Laet (yellow card) 74'; Mahrez 82'	Stadium: City Ground; Attendance: 24,808; Referee: Anthony Taylor

22 February 2014 32	Leicester City	3–0	Ipswich Town	Leicester
15:00 GMT	Wasilewski (yellow card) 16'; Vardy 19'; Nugent 31'; Wood 88'	Report	Tabb (yellow card) 17'	Stadium: King Power Stadium; Attendance: 28,078; Referee: J Linington

1 March 2014 33	Leicester City	3–0	Charlton Athletic	Leicester
15:00 GMT	Vardy 9', (yellow card) 28'; Drinkwater 48'; Nugent 64'	Report	Harriott (yellow card) 41'; Poyet (yellow card) 75'	Stadium: King Power Stadium; Attendance: 24,742; Referee: Jeremy Simpson

11 March 2014 34	Barnsley	0–3	Leicester City	Barnsley
19:45 GMT		Report	Vardy 21', 62'; Drinkwater 58'	Stadium: Oakwell; Attendance: 12,539; Referee: Mark Heywood

15 March 2014 35	Leicester City	3–1	Blackpool	Leicester
15:00 GMT	Vardy (yellow card) 49'; James (yellow card) 51'; Mahrez 60'; Morgan 82'; Phillips 87'	Report	Robinson (yellow card) 34'; Goodwillie 41'; Basham (yellow card) 81'	Stadium: King Power Stadium; Attendance: 27,669; Referee: Nigel Miller

22 March 2014 36	Blackburn Rovers	1–1	Leicester City	Blackburn
15:00 GMT	Kilgallon 43', (yellow card) 75'	Report	Vardy 20'; Schmeichel (yellow card) 66'	Stadium: Ewood Park; Attendance: 16,528; Referee: Eddie Ilderton

25 March 2014 37	Leicester City	1–1	Yeovil Town	Leicester
19:45 GMT	Wood 90+2'	Report	Ralls 22'; McAllister (yellow card) 65'	Stadium: King Power Stadium; Attendance: 26,240; Referee: Andy Madley

29 March 2014 38	Burnley	0–2	Leicester City	Burnley
12:45 GMT		Report	Nugent 35'; Wood 78'	Stadium: Turf Moor; Attendance: 16,794; Referee: Chris Foy

1 April 2014 39	Wigan Athletic	2–2	Leicester City	Wigan
19:45 BST	Ramis 37'; Gómez (yellow card) 41'; Kiernan 62'	Report	Hammond (yellow card) 37', (goal) 87'; King 41'	Stadium: DW Stadium; Attendance: 15,025; Referee: Jon Moss

4 April 2014 40	Leicester City	2–1	Sheffield Wednesday	Leicester
19:45 BST	Mahrez 10'; Schlupp (yellow card) 48'; Knockaert 61'	Report	Antonio 37'; Palmer (yellow card) 45+1'; Lee (yellow card) 60'	Stadium: King Power Stadium; Attendance: 26,103; Referee: Graham Scott

8 April 2014 41	Leicester City	1–4	Brighton & Hove Albion	Leicester
19:45 BST	Nugent (yellow card) 45'; Wasilewski (yellow card) 63'; Taylor-Fletcher 89'	Report	Ward 17'; Lingard 24'; Ulloa 64', 80'; Upson (yellow card) 85'	Stadium: King Power Stadium; Attendance: 29,722; Referee: Craig Pawson

14 April 2014 42	Reading	1–1	Leicester City	Reading
20:07 BST	Pearce 16'; Leigertwood (yellow card) 74' (yellow-red card) 87'	Report	Drinkwater 33'; De Laet (yellow card) 68'	Stadium: Madejski Stadium; Attendance: 20,072; Referee: Simon Hooper

19 April 2014 43	Leicester City	1–0	Queens Park Rangers	Leicester
12:15 BST	Nugent 68'; Schmeichel (yellow card) 73'	Report	Assou-Ekotto (yellow card) 39' (yellow-red card) 78'; Kranjčar (yellow card) 44'; O'Neil (yellow card) 57'	Stadium: King Power Stadium; Attendance: 27,386; Referee: Scott Duncan

22 April 2014 44	Bolton Wanderers	0–1	Leicester City	Bolton
20:00 BST		Report	Dyer 61'	Stadium: Reebok Stadium; Attendance: 16,569; Referee: David Webb

26 April 2014 45	Huddersfield Town	0–2	Leicester City	Huddersfield
15:00 BST		Report	Taylor-Fletcher 31'; Morgan 75'	Stadium: John Smith's Stadium; Attendance: 16,481; Referee: Iain Williamson

3 May 2014 46	Leicester City	1–0	Doncaster Rovers	Leicester
12:15 BST	Nugent 75' (pen.)	Report		Stadium: King Power Stadium; Attendance: 31,424; Referee: Paul Tierney

=== FA Cup ===
4 January 2014 Third round	Stoke City	2–1	Leicester City	Stoke-on-Trent
15:00 GMT	Jones 16'; Adam 55'	Report	Nugent 77'	Stadium: Britannia Stadium; Attendance: 16,844; Referee: Lee Probert

=== Football League Cup ===
6 August 2013 First Round	Wycombe Wanderers	1–2	Leicester City	Wycombe
19:45 BST	Kuffour 21'; Lewis (yellow card) 83'	Report	Nugent 14' (pen.); St Ledger 90+6'	Stadium: Adams Park; Attendance: 3,158; Referee: Tim Robinson

27 August 2013 Second Round	Carlisle United	2–5	Leicester City	Carlisle
19:45 BST	Amoo 16'; Berrett 71'	Report	Wood 38', 59' (pen.), 63'; Dyer 47'; Knockaert 51'	Stadium: Brunton Park; Attendance: 3,308 (576 Away); Referee: Graham Salisbury

24 September 2013 Third Round	Leicester City	2–1	Derby County	Leicester
19:45 BST	Hammond (yellow card) 45+3'; Knockaert 78'; Drinkwater 81'	Report	Martin 42'; Freeman (yellow card) 47'	Stadium: King Power Stadium; Attendance: 14,043; Referee: Dean Whitestone

29 October 2013 Fourth Round	Leicester City	4–3	Fulham	Leicester
19:45 GMT	Morgan 41'; Wood 45'; Miquel 53'; Morgan (yellow card) 79'; Dyer 89'	Report	Rodallega 18', 54'; Boateng (yellow card) 39'; Senderos (yellow card) 74'; Karagounis (yellow card) 76', (goal) 87'; Zverotić (yellow card) 88'	Stadium: King Power Stadium; Attendance: 17,932; Referee: Keith Stroud

17 December 2013 Fifth round	Leicester City	1–3	Manchester City	Leicester
19:45 GMT	Dyer 77'	Report	Kolarov 8'; Navas (yellow card) 21'; Boyata (yellow card) 34'; Džeko 41', 53'	Stadium: King Power Stadium; Attendance: 31,319; Referee: Roger East

== Awards ==
=== Club awards ===
At the end of the season, Leicester's annual award ceremony, including categories voted for by the players and backroom staff, the supporters and the supporters club, saw the following players recognised for their achievements for the club throughout the 2013–14 season.

Player of the Year Award	(England) Danny Drinkwater
Young Player of the Season Award	(England) Matty James
Players' Player of the Season Award	(England) Jamie Vardy
Academy Player of the Season Award	(France) Herve Pepe-Ngoma
Goal of the Season Award	(England) Danny Drinkwater (vs. Watford, 8 February 2014)
Performance of the Season	vs. Derby County, 10 January 2014

=== Divisional awards ===
Date	Nation	Winner	Award
September 2013	(England)	Liam Moore	Football League Young Player of the Month
December 2013	(England)	Danny Drinkwater	Championship Player of the Month
January 2014	(England)	Nigel Pearson	Championship Manager of the Month
March 2014	(England)	Nigel Pearson	Championship Manager of the Month
Season	(Denmark)	Kasper Schmeichel	PFA Championship Team of the Year
Season	(Jamaica)	Wes Morgan	PFA Championship Team of the Year
Season	(England)	Danny Drinkwater	PFA Championship Team of the Year
Season	(England)	Nigel Pearson	LMA Championship Manager of the Year

== Championship statistics ==
=== League table ===
Pos	Team	Pld	W	D	L	GF	GA	GD	Pts	Promotion, qualification or relegation
1	Leicester City (C, P)	46	31	9	6	83	43	+40	102	Promotion to the Premier League
2	Burnley (P)	46	26	15	5	72	37	+35	93	Promotion to the Premier League
3	Derby County	46	25	10	11	84	52	+32	85	Qualification for Championship play-offs
4	Queens Park Rangers (O, P)	46	23	11	12	60	44	+16	80	Qualification for Championship play-offs
5	Wigan Athletic	46	21	10	15	61	48	+13	73	Qualification for Championship play-offs

Source: BBC Sport
Rules for classification: 1) points; 2) goal difference; 3) number of goals scored
(C) Champions; (O) Play-off winners; (P) Promoted

=== Club standings ===
Overall								Home						Away					
Pld	W	D	L	GF	GA	GD	Pts	W	D	L	GF	GA	GD	W	D	L	GF	GA	GD
46	31	9	6	83	43	+40	102	17	4	2	46	22	+24	14	5	4	37	21	+16

Last updated: 3 May 2014.
Source: LCFC Championship Results

==== Results by round ====
Round	1	2	3	4	5	6	7	8	9	10	11	12	13	14	15	16	17	18	19	20	21	22	23	24	25	26	27	28	29	30	31	32	33	34	35	36	37	38	39	40	41	42	43	44	45	46
Ground	A	H	A	H	A	H	H	A	H	H	A	H	H	A	H	A	H	A	A	H	A	H	H	A	H	A	H	A	A	H	A	H	H	A	H	A	H	A	A	H	H	A	H	A	A	H
Result	W	D	W	W	L	W	W	D	W	W	L	W	W	W	L	W	W	L	L	D	W	W	W	W	W	W	W	W	W	D	D	W	W	W	W	D	D	W	D	W	L	D	W	W	W	W
Position	5	9	6	2	5	4	1	3	3	3	3	3	2	2	2	2	1	1	3	3	2	1	1	1	1	1	1	1	1	1	1	1	1	1	1	1	1	1	1	1	1	1	1	1	1	1

Updated to match(es) played on 3 May 2014. Source:
A = Away; H = Home; W = Win; D = Draw; L = Loss

=== Scores by club ===
Leicester City score given first.

Opposition	Home score	Away score	Double
Barnsley	2–1	3–0	Leicester City do double
Blackburn Rovers	2–1	1–1	
Birmingham City	3–2	2–1	Leicester City do double
Blackpool	3–1	2–2	
Bolton Wanderers	5–3	1–0	Leicester City do double
Bournemouth	2–1	1–0	Leicester City do double
Brighton & Hove Albion	1–4	1–3	Brighton & Hove Albion do double
Burnley	1–1	2–0	
Charlton Athletic	3–0	1–2	
Derby County	4–1	1–0	Leicester City do double
Doncaster Rovers	1–0	0–1	
Huddersfield Town	2–1	2–1	Leicester City do double
Ipswich Town	3–0	2–1	Leicester City do double
Leeds United	0–0	1–0	
Middlesbrough	2–0	2–1	Leicester City do double
Millwall	3–0	3–1	Leicester City do double
Nottingham Forest	0–2	2–2	
Queens Park Rangers	1–0	1–0	Leicester City do double
Reading	1–0	1–1	
Sheffield Wednesday	2–1	1–2	
Watford	2–2	3–0	
Wigan Athletic	2–0	2–2	
Yeovil Town	1–1	2–1	

== Club statistics ==
All data from LCFC.com and FoxesTalk Stats

=== Appearances ===
- Starts + Substitute appearances.
- Italics indicates loan player.
- Asterisks indicates player left mid-season.
- Hash symbol indicates player retired mid-season.

No.	Pos	Nat	Player	Total		Championship		FA Cup		League Cup	
No.	Pos	Nat	Player	Apps	Goals	Apps	Goals	Apps	Goals	Apps	Goals
1	GK	(Denmark) DEN	Kasper Schmeichel	51	0	46	0	1	0	4	0
2	DF	(Belgium) BEL	Ritchie De Laet	38	2	35+1	2	1	0	1	0
3	DF	(England) ENG	Paul Konchesky	34	1	31	1	1	0	2	0
4	MF	(England) ENG	Danny Drinkwater	49	8	43+2	7	0	0	4	1
5	DF	(Jamaica) JAM	Wes Morgan	48	3	45	2	0	0	3	1
6	DF	(United States) USA	Zak Whitbread	4	0	3	0	0	0	1	0
7	MF	(England) ENG	Ben Marshall*	0	0	0	0	0	0	0	0
7	MF	(England) ENG	Dean Hammond	32	1	7+22	1	1	0	2	0
8	MF	(England) ENG	Matty James	39	1	28+7	1	1	0	3	0
9	FW	(England) ENG	Jamie Vardy	41	16	36+1	16	1	0	1+2	0
10	MF	(Wales) WAL	Andy King	33	4	24+6	4	1	0	2	0
11	MF	(England) ENG	Lloyd Dyer	46	10	31+9	7	0+1	0	3+2	3
12	DF	(Republic of Ireland) IRL	Sean St. Ledger	2	1	1	0	0	0	1	1
14	FW	(England) ENG	Martyn Waghorn*	4	0	0+2	0	0+1	0	0+1	0
15	FW	(Ghana) GHA	Jeffrey Schlupp	32	1	15+11	1	1	0	2+3	0
16	MF	(England) ENG	Neil Danns	1	0	0	0	0	0	1	0
17	FW	(Scotland) SCO	Paul Gallagher	0	0	0	0	0	0	0	0
18	DF	(England) ENG	Liam Moore	33	1	26+4	1	0	0	3	0
20	FW	(England) ENG	Tom Hopper	2	0	0	0	0	0	1+1	0
21	DF	(Ivory Coast) CIV	Zoumana Bakayogo	2	0	0	0	0	0	2	0
22	FW	(England) ENG	Gary Taylor-Fletcher	23	3	2+19	3	0	0	2	0
23	DF	(Spain) ESP	Ignasi Miquel	12	1	6+1	0	1	0	4	1
24	MF	(France) FRA	Anthony Knockaert	48	7	36+6	5	1	0	3+2	2
25	GK	(Republic of Ireland) IRL	Conrad Logan	1	0	0	0	0	0	1	0
26	MF	(Algeria) ALG	Riyad Mahrez	19	3	12+7	3	0	0	0	0
27	DF	(Poland) POL	Marcin Wasilewski	35	0	26+5	0	1	0	3	0
28	FW	(England) ENG	Kevin Phillips	12	2	2+10	2	0	0	0	0
29	FW	(Hungary) HUN	Márkó Futács	0	0	0	0	0	0	0	0
35	FW	(England) ENG	David Nugent	51	22	44+2	20	0+1	1	2+2	1
39	FW	(New Zealand) NZL	Chris Wood	29	8	7+19	4	0	0	3	4

=== Top scorers ===
Last Updated: 3 May 2014

Pos.	Nat.	Name	League	FA Cup	League Cup	Total
1	(England)	David Nugent	20	1	1	22
2	(England)	Jamie Vardy	16	0	0	16
3	(England)	Lloyd Dyer	7	0	3	10
4	(England)	Danny Drinkwater	7	0	1	8
=	(New Zealand)	Chris Wood	4	0	4	8
6	(France)	Anthony Knockaert	5	0	2	7
7	(Wales)	Andy King	4	0	0	4
8	(Algeria)	Riyad Mahrez	3	0	0	3
=	(England)	Gary Taylor-Fletcher	3	0	0	3
=	(Jamaica)	Wes Morgan	2	0	1	3
11	(Belgium)	Ritchie De Laet	2	0	0	2
=	(England)	Kevin Phillips	2	0	0	2
13	(England)	Dean Hammond	1	0	0	1
=	(England)	Matty James	1	0	0	1
=	(England)	Liam Moore	1	0	0	1
=	(England)	Paul Konchesky	1	0	0	1
=	(Ghana)	Jeffrey Schlupp	1	0	0	1
=	(Spain)	Ignasi Miquel	0	0	1	1
=	(Republic of Ireland)	Sean St Ledger	0	0	1	1
Own goals			3	0	0	3
Total			83	1	14	98

=== Disciplinary record ===
Nation	Name	Yellow card	Red card
(England)	Matty James	4	1
(England)	Paul Konchesky	1	1
(England)	Jamie Vardy	9	0
(Belgium)	Ritchie De Laet	6	0
(France)	Anthony Knockaert	6	0
(Poland)	Marcin Wasilewski	6	0
(England)	Dean Hammond	4	0
(Jamaica)	Wes Morgan	4	0
(England)	Danny Drinkwater	3	0
(England)	Liam Moore	2	0
(England)	David Nugent	2	0
(Denmark)	Kasper Schmeichel	2	0
(Wales)	Andy King	1	0
(Spain)	Ignasi Miquel	1	0
(Ghana)	Jeffrey Schlupp	1	0
(England)	Gary Taylor-Fletcher	1	0
(United States)	Zak Whitbread	1	0
Total		54	2

=== Captains ===
Last Updated: 3 May 2014

- Only counts starts as captain

No.	Position	Nation	Name	Starts
5	CB	(Jamaica)	Wes Morgan	48
1	GK	(Denmark)	Kasper Schmeichel	3
11	LW	(England)	Lloyd Dyer	1

=== Suspensions ===
Date Incurred	Nation	Name	Games Missed	Reason
31 August 2013	(England)	Matty James	1	(yellow card) (yellow-red card) (vs. Charlton Athletic)
9 November 2013	(France)	Anthony Knockaert	1	Yellow card
29 December 2013	(England)	Jamie Vardy	1	Yellow card
19 February 2014	(England)	Paul Konchesky	3	(red card) (vs. Nottingham Forest)

=== Penalties ===
Date	Nation	Name	Opposition	Scored?
6 August 2013	(England)	David Nugent	Wycombe Wanderers	✓
24 August 2013	(England)	David Nugent	Birmingham City	✓
27 August 2013	(New Zealand)	Chris Wood	Carlisle United	✓
14 September 2013	(England)	David Nugent	Wigan Athletic	✓
17 September 2013	(England)	David Nugent	Blackburn Rovers	✓
21 September 2013	(England)	Paul Konchesky	Blackpool	✓
28 September 2013	(England)	David Nugent	Barnsley	✓
1 October 2013	(England)	David Nugent	Yeovil Town	✓
9 November 2013	(England)	David Nugent	Nottingham Forest	✗
14 December 2013	(England)	David Nugent	Burnley	✓
26 December 2013	(England)	David Nugent	Reading	✓
29 December 2013	(England)	David Nugent	Bolton Wanderers	✗
10 January 2014	(England)	David Nugent	Derby County	✓
25 January 2014	(England)	David Nugent	Middlesbrough	✗
19 February 2014	(England)	Kevin Phillips	Nottingham Forest	✗
3 May 2014	(England)	David Nugent	Doncaster Rovers	✓

=== Overall seasonal record ===
Note: Games which are level after extra-time and are decided by a penalty shoot-out are listed as draws.

Games played	52 (46 Championship, 1 FA Cup, 5 League Cup)
Games won	35 (31 Championship, 0 FA Cup, 4 League Cup)
Games drawn	9 (9 Championship, 0 FA Cup, 0 League Cup)
Games lost	8 (6 Championship, 1 FA Cup, 1 League Cup)
Win %	67.31%
Goals scored	98 (83 Championship, 1 FA Cup, 14 League Cup)
Goals conceded	55 (43 Championship, 2 FA Cup, 10 League Cup)
Goal difference	+43 (+40 Championship, −1 FA Cup, +4 League Cup)
Yellow cards	54 (49 Championship, 0 FA Cup, 5 League Cup)
Red cards	2 (2 Championship, 0 FA Cup, 0 League Cup)
Worst discipline	Jamie Vardy (9 yellows)
Biggest win	5–2 (on one occasion), 4–1 (on one occasion) & 3–0 (on five occasions)
Heaviest defeat	1–4 (vs. Brighton and hove albion, Championship, 8 April 2014)
Highest scoring match	5–3 (vs. Bolton Wanderers, Championship, 29 December 2013)
Most appearances	51 (Kasper Schmeichel & David Nugent)
Top scorer	20 (David Nugent)
Most assists	13 (David Nugent)
