= Anthony Knockaert =

French footballer (born 1991)

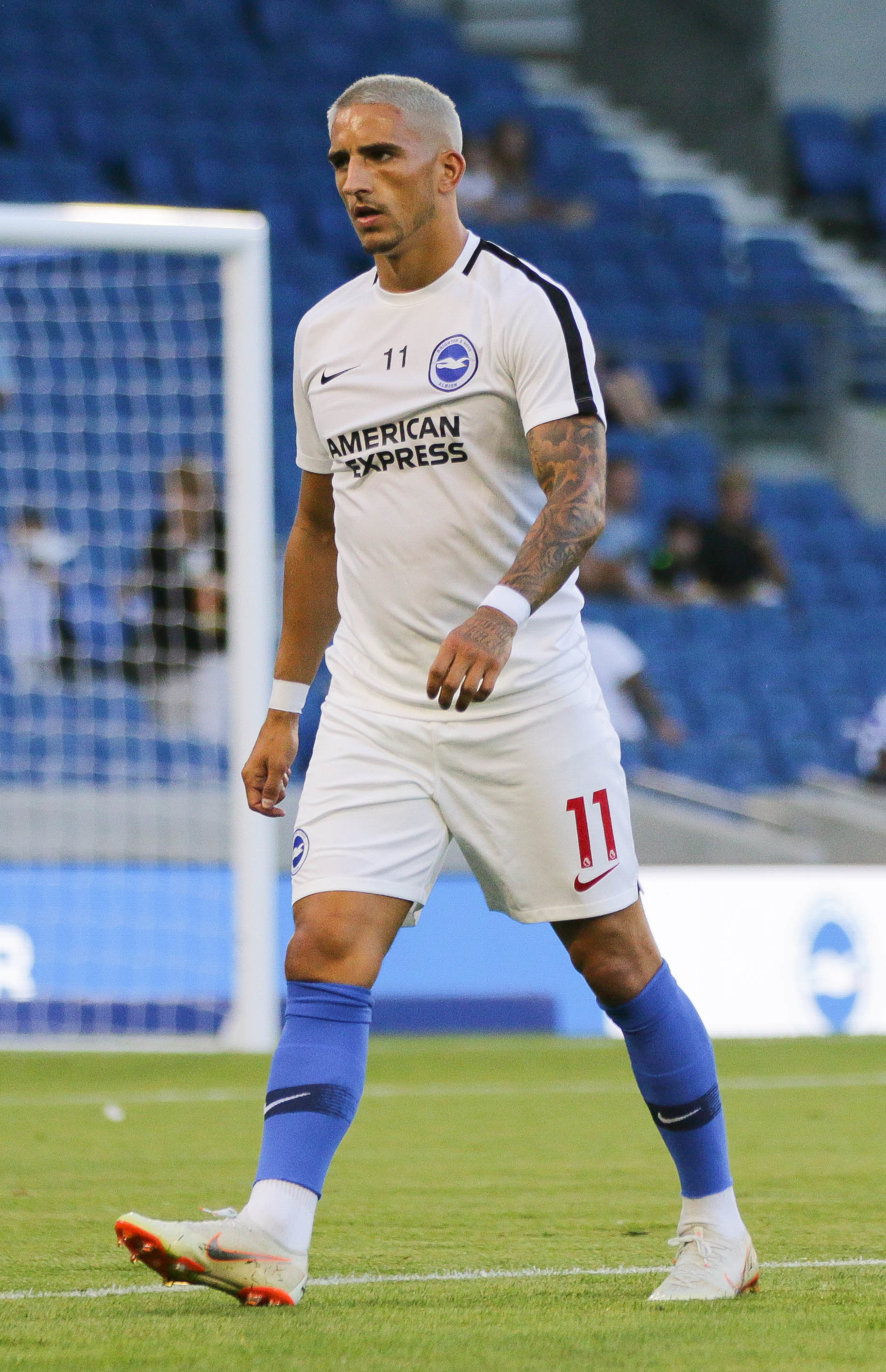
- Knockaert playing for Brighton & Hove Albion in 2018

Personal information
- Full name: Anthony Patrick Knockaert
- Date of birth: 20 November 1991 (age 34)
- Place of birth: Roubaix, Nord, France
- Height: 1.72 m (5 ft 8 in)
- Position: Winger

Youth career
- 1997–1999: Wasquehal
- 1999–2001: Leers
- 2001–2004: Lens
- 2004–2007: Mouscron
- 2007–2009: Lesquin

Senior career*
Years	Team	Apps	(Gls)
2009–2012	Guingamp	59	(13)
2012–2015	Leicester City	93	(13)
2015–2016	Standard Liège	20	(5)
2016–2020	Brighton & Hove Albion	127	(25)
2019–2020	→ Fulham (loan)	38	(3)
2020–2023	Fulham	8	(0)
2020–2021	→ Nottingham Forest (loan)	34	(2)
2022–2023	→ Volos (loan)	9	(1)
2023	→ Huddersfield Town (loan)	5	(0)
2023–2024	Valenciennes	21	(1)
Total		414	(63)

International career
2011–2012	France U20	10	(4)
2012	France U21	3	(1)
- * Club domestic league appearances and goals

Anthony Patrick Knockaert (born 20 November 1991) is a French former professional footballer who played as a winger.

== Club career ==
=== Guingamp ===
Knockaert began his professional career with Guingamp, having previously spent his youth career at Wasquehal, Leers, Lens, Mouscron and Lesquin. While progressing in the youth at Lesquin, he almost joined Leeds United in September 2008, but both parties could not agree terms after Lens intervened in the transfer and demanded a compensatory fee. At some point on progressing his youth career, Knockaert thought about considering quitting football after being told by the Lens' management that he was released because he was small at the time.

It was not until the summer of 2009 when he moved to Guingamp, where he signed his first professional contract. It was not until on 30 July 2010 when he made his Guingamp debut in the first round of the Coupe de la Ligue, scoring in a 2–1 win over Grenoble. After playing 120 minutes, in a 3–2 win over Evian in the second round of the Coupe de la Ligue, he scored his second goal in the Coupe de la Ligue, in a 3–2 win over on 22 September 2010. Seven days later, on 29 September 2010, he made his league debut, making his first start and played 69 minutes before being substituted, in a 5–0 win over Gap. Soon after, he signed a three-year contract with the club on 6 October 2010 Knockaert then scored his first league goals, in a 6–0 win over Maccabi Paris Métropole on 22 April 2011. After helping the club's promotion to Ligue 2, he made 27 appearances scoring 4 times in all competitions.

In the 2011–12 season, Knockaert started the season well when he scored twice in a 2–0 win over Vannes in the second round of the Coupe de la Ligue on 9 August 2011. Weeks later, on 9 September 2011, he scored his first goal of the season, in a 2–1 loss against Reims. It was not until on 17 October 2011 when he scored again, in a 4–1 win over AS Monaco. In the ten matches between 19 December 2011 and 16 March 2012, he scored six times against Sedan, Istres, Boulogne, Le Havre, Troyes and Lens. Knockaert then scored three more goals later in the season, scoring twice against Metz and once against Clermont. He finished the 2011–12 season making 38 appearances and scoring thirteen times in all competitions.

At the end of the season, Knockaert's performance at Guingamp attracted interests from clubs around Europe, such as English side Newcastle United, and Portuguese side Benfica, as well as being linked with his native country side Montpellier.

=== Leicester City ===
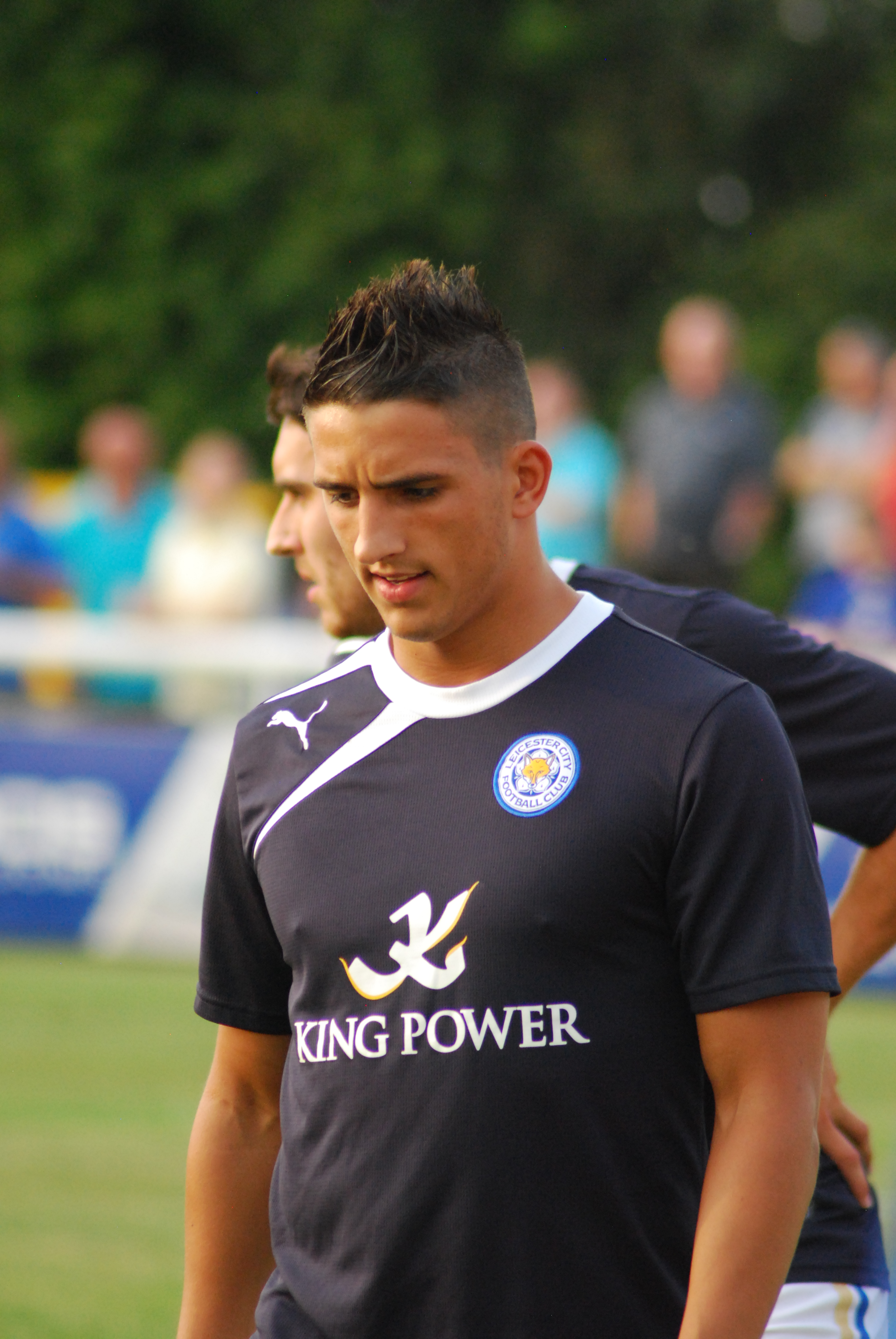
Knockaert warming up for Leicester City in 2013

On 1 August 2012, Knockaert moved to Leicester City on a three-year contract. The transfer fee was initially undisclosed, but was later revealed as £2.5 million.

Knockaert made his Leicester City debut on 18 August 2012, where he came on as a substitute for Lloyd Dyer in the second half, in a 2–0 win over Peterborough United. he then scored his first goal for Leicester with a free-kick against Burton Albion in the League Cup on 28 August 2012. His first league goals came in a 2–0 win at Huddersfield Town on 2 October 2012. The first was a 35-yard shot into the top corner, while the second saw him flick the ball in from behind with his left heel, after a cross from left-back Paul Konchesky. By the end 2012, he scored two more goals against Ipswich Town and Barnsley. On 1 January 2013, he scored another two league goals for the club in the reverse fixture against Huddersfield Town with Leicester City winning 6–1 and then scored another by the end of January, with a 2–1 win over Wolverhampton Wanderers. On 4 May 2013, he scored the winning goal in a 3–2 victory over Nottingham Forest at the City Ground that got Leicester City into a playoff place. Following his performance against Forest, which also contained an assist for Andy King's 50th Leicester goal, Knockaert was named in the Championship Team of the Week, alongside King. However, in the 2013 Playoff semi-final second leg, with the aggregate scores level he won a penalty for Leicester City deep into stoppage time. He opted to take the penalty himself but it was saved by Watford goalkeeper Manuel Almunia who also saved the follow-up, leading to the famous goal by Troy Deeney that sent Watford to Wembley. Despite this, he went on to win both Young Player of the Year and Goal of the Season against Huddersfield Town and finished his first season making 47 appearances and scoring nine times in all competitions.

In the 2013–14 season, Knockaert scored his first goal of the 2013–14 season in the 5–2 League Cup victory away to Carlisle United and scored again in the second round of the League Cup with a 30-yard free kick at home to Derby County and then assisted Danny Drinkwater's winning goal in a 2nd half come back in the 3rd round victory. Despite his good performances, he did not score his first league goal until Leicester's 3–0 away win against Watford. After scoring three more goals from December to early-January against Sheffield Wednesday, Bolton Wanderers and Millwall, He was a regular member of a settled side that went unbeaten from early December until 5 April, when promotion was assured after losses by third placed QPR and fourth placed Derby County. Knockaert had scored the winning goal from a free-kick in a Friday night fixture the day before, at home to Sheffield Wednesday. He went on to finish the 2014–15 season making 50 appearances and scoring 7 times in all competitions.

In the 2014–15 season, Knockaert made his first Premier League appearance in the opening game of the season, where he played 64 minutes before being substituted, in a 2–2 draw against Everton. However, he struggled to regain his first team place, owing to the performances of Nick Powell, Marc Albrighton and Danny Simpson. In effort to fight for the first team place, he was sent to play for the club's reserves, which he did for most of the season. Despite being rumoured to be loaned out to clubs in the Championship throughout the season, manager Pearson blocked his loan move from happening unless the squad was strengthened. Nevertheless, Knockaert made 11 appearances in the 2014–15 season in all competitions.

At the end of the 2014–15 season, Knockaert's contract was set to expire and he began talks with the club over a new contract, with manager Pearson revealing that he was given a "fair contract offer". However, he rejected a contract, revealing he had been offered a four-year contract. Despite this, Knockaert made a farewell message to Leicester City supporters upon leaving the club, stating that he would not forget the club.

=== Standard Liège ===
On 4 June 2015, it was announced that Knockaert had joined Standard Liège on a free transfer. It came after the club had begun to open talks with Knockaert the month before.

Knockaert started well on his Standard Liège debut when he scored his first goal for the club despite losing 2–1 to Kortrijk in the opening game of the season. Five days later, he scored again, but this time in an UEFA Europa League match against Željezničar Sarajevo, as well as setting up a goal in a 2–1 win. Following this, he scored again in the league on 15 August 2015, in a 1–1 draw against Mouscron and scoring two weeks later, in a UEFA Europa League against Molde in the return leg, in a 3–1 win, but was eliminated following an away goal from Molde. Despite this, he scored three more goals by the end of 2015 against Gent, Genk and Mechelen. However, in a match against Oud-Heverlee Leuven on 26 September 2015, Knockaert reacted furiously via Twitter when he substituted during the second half, in a 2–2 draw. Following, he soon apologised the way he behaved and vowed to be calmer next time.

Between July 2015 and January 2016, Knockaert made 20 appearances and scored 5 goals in 2015–16 for the club despite missing out a game, due to suspension after picking a yellow card for the fifth time this season against Anderlecht on 8 November 2015. On 6 January 2016, Standard confirmed they had accepted an offer from Championship side Brighton & Hove Albion with the player set to travel to England to agree personal terms.

=== Brighton and Hove Albion ===
==== 2015–16 season ====
On 7 January 2016, Brighton & Hove Albion confirmed the signing of Knockaert for an undisclosed fee on a three-year contract. Upon joining the club, he said the move interested him, citing the club's ambition as the reason he returned to England.

Knockaert made his Brighton debut five days after signing with the club on 12 January 2016, playing the full 90 minutes in a 2–0 defeat against Rotherham United. He soon began to have an impact at Brighton, setting up two assists for his team in a 2–1 win over Huddersfield Town on 23 January 2016. He scored his first goal for Brighton in a 3–0 win over Brentford on 5 February 2016.

Knockaert was a key performer for Brighton in April 2016, scoring against Burnley, Fulham and twice against Queens Park Rangers, as the club pushed for automatic promotion. His performances in April earned him the Player of the Month award. Despite Brighton's unsuccessful attempt to reach promotion to the Premier League after losing in the play-offs to Sheffield Wednesday, Knockaert impressed for the club, making 16 appearances and scoring 5 times.

==== 2016–17 season ====
In the 2016–17 season, Knockaert was linked with a move to recently relegated side Newcastle United, but Brighton rejected their bid. He began the season well, scoring three goals for Brighton in their first five matches against Nottingham Forest, Rotherham United and Reading. He also began playing in advanced role behind Tomer Hemed up front. He scored again for Brighton on 13 September 2016, in a 1–0 win over Huddersfield Town. In October 2016, Knockaert scored against Sheffield Wednesday, and also contributed to Brighton's 5–0 drubbing of Norwich City.

On 3 March 2017, Knockaert signed a new four-year contract extension with the club, expiring in June 2021. On 9 April 2017, he was named EFL's Championship Player of the Year having scored 13 goals in 40 games at that stage of the season. He finished the season with 15 goals in 45 appearances in the league and overall where Brighton were promoted to the Premier League.

==== 2017–18 season ====
Brighton's first match in the top flight for 34 years was at home to eventual champions Manchester City. Knockaert was brought on to replace Solly March in the 75th minute with Brighton trailing 2–0, the scoreline that the game finished. Knockaert scored his first Premier League goal on 15 October 2017, in a 1–1 home draw against Everton. He scored his second Premier League goal for Brighton on 1 January 2018, the opening goal in a 2–2 draw against AFC Bournemouth. On 10 March, Knockaert was sent off for the first time in the Premier League away against Everton as a result of an in air two footed challenge. (Brighton were already 2–0 down in the 2–0 defeat). Knockaert played in the 1–0 home victory over Manchester Utd on 4 May 2018 which secured Albion's Premier League status. BBC Sport's Emlyn Begley described Knockaert and fellow winger Jose Izquierdo as "fantastic" in this game.

==== 2018–19 season ====
On 5 January 2019 Knockaert scored his first ever FA Cup goal in a 3–1 away win against south coast rivals Bournemouth in the third round. On 9 March Knockaert scored a screamer which turned out to be the winner against bitter rivals Crystal Palace where it finished 2–1 at Selhurst Park. This win meant Brighton won the double over Palace. Knockaert's goal also won the Premier League Goal of the Month for March. On 13 April Knockaert was sent off for the second time in his Premier League career. Albion were 2–0 down against Bournemouth at the time of the red card and went on to be beaten 5–0 at home.

=== Fulham ===
==== Initial loan and then transfer, then later departure ====
On 21 July 2019, Knockaert joined Fulham on a season-long loan from Brighton & Hove Albion with an option to make the move permanent. On 3 August, Knockaert made his debut, coming on as a sub in a 1–0 away loss to Barnsley. Knockaert scored his first goal for Fulham in a 4–0 home victory against Millwall on 21 August.

On 8 July 2020, Fulham completed the permanent transfer of Knockaert in a deal worth up to £15 million with add-ons. With the deal, Knockaert signed a three-year contract. Knockaert played in all three of Fulham's play-off matches, coming on in the 81st minute as a substitute in the final where Fulham beat rivals Brentford after extra time to earn an immediate return to the Premier League. The promotion meant that Knockaert had been promoted to the top flight with all three English clubs for whom he had played with at the time.

On 3 September 2023, Fulham announced that they had terminated Knockaert's contract by mutual consent.

==== Loan to Nottingham Forest ====
On 16 October 2020, Knockaert joined Championship side Nottingham Forest on a loan until 7 January 2021 in where he was to play under former Brighton manager Chris Hughton. He made his debut for the Tricky Trees coming on as a substitute in a 1–1 home draw against Derby County on 23 October. Knockaert scored his first goal for Forest in a 2–1 away loss at Norwich on 9 December. Three days later he set up a 90+2-minute header with Joe Worrall scoring the consolation, before being sent off for a second yellow for diving in 90+5-minute a 3–1 home defeat against Brentford. On 12 January 2021, it was announced that Knockaert's loan with Nottingham Forest had been extended until the end of the 2020–21 season. 11 days later he scored his second Forest goal in a 5–1 FA Cup fourth round defeat at Swansea City on 23 January. He scored his third goal for Forest in a 3–0 away win over Wycombe Wanderers on 6 February, in a match where former Brighton teammate Glenn Murray scored his first two goals for the club and other former Brighton teammate Gaëtan Bong picked up an assist in the victory.

==== Loan to Volos ====
On 10 September 2022, Knockaert joined Super League Greece club Volos on a season-long loan.

==== Loan to Huddersfield Town ====
On 11 January 2023, Knockaert joined EFL Championship side Huddersfield Town on loan for the remainder of the 2022–23 season.

=== Valenciennes ===
Knockaert joined French Ligue 2 club Valenciennes in September 2023 following his departure from Fulham.

=== Retirement ===
On 11 July 2024, Knockaert announced his retirement from professional football, at age 32, through a post on his Instagram account, leaving a "special thanks" to his former club Brighton for the support he received from club and team-mates following the loss of his father.

== International career ==
After representing France under-20, Knockaert was called up by France under-21 for the first time and made his France under-21 debut, scoring in a 2–1 win over Chile under-20 on 10 September 2012. He went on to make two more France under-21 appearances against Norway under-21 on 12 October 2012 and 16 October 2012.

== Personal life ==
He holds dual French-Belgian citizenship. In 2015, Knockaert was given a personal leave from Leicester City after his father, Patrick, became ill. The following year, when his father died on 3 November 2016, he sat out of the match against Bristol City. It was not the first time he suffered a tragedy: he lost his elder brother, Steve, in 2011 and after scoring in a 3–0 win against Nottingham Forest, Knockaert dedicated his goal to his late brother. Knockaert has two children, a son and a daughter.

In September 2018 he revealed his struggles with mental health issues.

== Career statistics ==
As of 5 February 2022

Appearances and goals by club, season and competition
Club	Season	League			National cup		League cup		Other		Total	
Club	Season	Division	Apps	Goals	Apps	Goals	Apps	Goals	Apps	Goals	Apps	Goals
Guingamp	2010–11	Championnat National	23	2	0	0	4	3	—		27	5
Guingamp	2011–12	Ligue 2	36	11	2	0	2	2	—		40	13
Guingamp	Total		59	13	2	0	6	5	0	0	67	18
Leicester City	2012–13	Championship	42	8	2	0	1	1	2 (Note: Championship play-offs)	0	47	9
Leicester City	2013–14	Championship	42	5	1	0	5	2	—		48	7
Leicester City	2014–15	Premier League	9	0	1	0	1	0	—		11	0
Leicester City	Total		93	13	4	0	7	3	2	0	106	16
Standard Liège	2015–16	Belgian Pro League	20	5	3	0	—		4 (Note: Appearances in UEFA Europa League)	2	27	7
Brighton & Hove Albion	2015–16	Championship	19	5	0	0	0	0	2 (Note: Championship play-offs)	0	21	5
Brighton & Hove Albion	2016–17	Championship	45	15	0	0	0	0	—		45	15
Brighton & Hove Albion	2017–18	Premier League	33	3	2	0	2	0	—		37	3
Brighton & Hove Albion	2018–19	Premier League	30	2	6	2	0	0	—		36	4
Brighton & Hove Albion	Total		127	25	8	2	2	0	2	0	139	27
Fulham (loan)	2019–20	Championship	38	3	1	1	1	0	—		39	4
Fulham	2019–20	Championship	4	0	0	0	0	0	3 (Note: Championship play-offs)	0	7	0
Fulham	2020–21	Premier League	0	0	0	0	3	0	—		3	0
Fulham	2021–22	Championship	4	0	1	0	2	0	—		7	0
Fulham	Total		8	0	1	0	5	0	3	0	17	0
Nottingham Forest (loan)	2020–21	Championship	33	2	1	1	0	0	—		34	3
Career total			378	61	20	4	19	8	11	2	428	75

== Honours ==
Guingamp

- Championnat National third-place promotion: 2010–11

Leicester City

- Football League Championship: 2013–14

Brighton & Hove Albion

- EFL Championship second-place promotion: 2016–17

Fulham

- EFL Championship play-offs: 2020

Individual

- PFA Team of the Year: 2016–17 Championship
- EFL Team of the Season: 2016–17
- EFL Championship Player of the Year: 2016–17
- Football League Championship Player of the Month: April 2016
- Premier League Goal of the Month: March 2019
