= Ritchie De Laet =

Belgian footballer (born 1988)

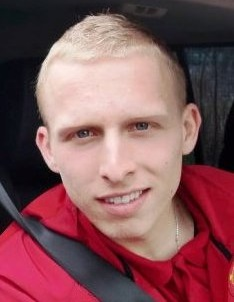
- De Laet with Manchester United in 2010

Personal information
- Full name: Ritchie Ria Alfons De Laet
- Date of birth: 28 November 1988 (age 37)
- Place of birth: Antwerp, Belgium
- Height: 1.86 m (6 ft 1 in)
- Position: Defender

Youth career
- 1994–1998: KSK Hoboken
- 1998–1999: Mechelen
- 1999–2004: KSK Hoboken
- 2004–2005: KFCO Wilrijk
- 2005–2006: Royal Antwerp

Senior career*
Years	Team	Apps	(Gls)
2006–2007	Royal Antwerp	4	(0)
2007–2009	Stoke City	0	(0)
2008	→ Wrexham (loan)	3	(0)
2009–2012	Manchester United	3	(0)
2010	→ Sheffield United (loan)	6	(0)
2010	→ Preston North End (loan)	5	(0)
2011	→ Portsmouth (loan)	22	(0)
2011–2012	→ Norwich City (loan)	6	(1)
2012–2016	Leicester City	115	(4)
2016	→ Middlesbrough (loan)	10	(0)
2016–2019	Aston Villa	8	(0)
2018	→ Royal Antwerp (loan)	6	(0)
2018–2019	→ Melbourne City (loan)	25	(7)
2019–2024	Royal Antwerp	150	(2)
Total		363	(14)

International career
2009	Belgium U21	4	(0)
2009	Belgium	2	(0)
- * Club domestic league appearances and goals

Ritchie Ria Alfons De Laet (Dutch pronunciation: [ˈrɪtɕi də ˈlaːt]; born 28 November 1988) is a Belgian former professional footballer who played as a defender.

De Laet played for various youth teams before joining the Royal Antwerp youth academy, where he was eventually picked up by Stoke City in 2007. Two years later, De Laet was signed by Premier League champions Manchester United where he mainly appeared for the reserves besides being sent on loan spells. In 2012, he joined Leicester City where he played more consistently and was part of the historic team winning the 2015–16 Premier League. He then had a three-year stint with Aston Villa, before returning to Royal Antwerp in 2019 where he won the domestic double.

De Laet made his international debut for Belgium in 2009, and gained two caps for the national team.

== Club career ==
=== Stoke City ===
Born in Antwerp, De Laet began his career at Belgian club Royal Antwerp. On 17 August 2007, he signed a three-year contract with Championship team Stoke City for an initial £100,000 fee. In July 2008, De Laet joined AFC Bournemouth on trial and played his first game in a friendly against Portsmouth, a 4–1 defeat. However, he later returned to Stoke. In October 2008, he joined Wrexham of the Conference National on a one-month loan deal, making his debut in a 2–0 victory over Lewes in the league. He made three appearances during his time at the club before his loan spell was terminated in order for him to undergo a hernia operation.

=== Manchester United ===
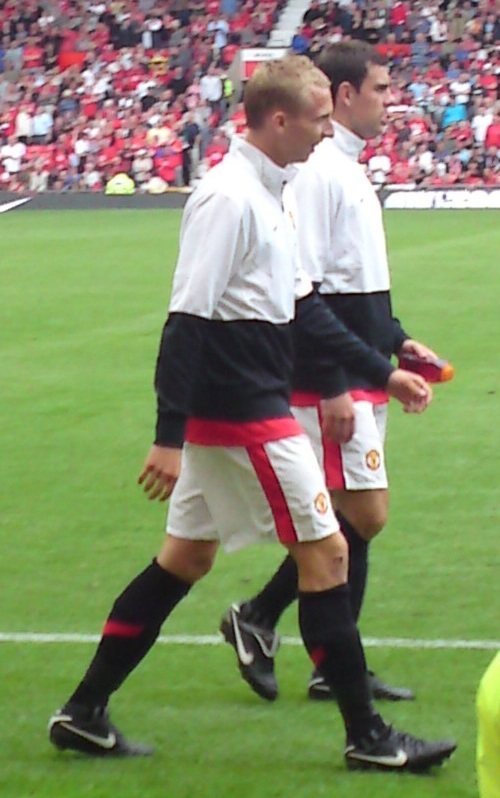
De Laet (front), with Darron Gibson, at Manchester United to Birmingham City on 16 August 2009

On 8 January 2009, De Laet was signed by Premier League champions Manchester United on a three-year contract. The fee to be paid by Manchester United depended on appearances. After joining United, De Laet played exclusively for the club's reserve team. In March 2009, De Laet was named as one of five over-age players in the Manchester United under-18 squad for the Torneo Calcio Memorial Claudio Sassi-Sassuolo; he played in three of the five matches, and scored a penalty in the 5–3 semi-final penalty shoot-out win over Modena to take the Red Devils into the final, in which they beat Ajax 1–0. De Laet made his first appearance for the Manchester United first team on 24 May 2009, when he was named at left-back for the last game of the 2008–09 Premier League season against Hull City.

In the 2009–10 season, De Laet featured in the League Cup, coming on as a substitute against Wolverhampton Wanderers and Barnsley in the third and fourth rounds and starting against Tottenham Hotspur in the fifth. Despite a defensive injury crisis in November 2009, Alex Ferguson preferred to bring midfielder Michael Carrick on for Gary Neville ahead of De Laet, after the United captain suffered a groin strain in the next league match away to West Ham United on 5 December. He then played his first league game of the 2009–10 season on 15 December against Wolverhampton Wanderers. De Laet played his second league game against Fulham on 19 December, which ended in a 3–0 defeat. On 4 May 2010, he was voted as the Denzil Haroun Reserve Team Player of the Year, beating Oliver Gill and Magnus Wolff Eikrem to the award.

In September 2010, De Laet joined Championship side Sheffield United on a 30-day emergency loan deal after the Blades suffered a defensive injury crisis, with both Chris Morgan and Rob Kozluk ruled out for several weeks. De Laet returned to Old Trafford at the end of his month having made six appearances for the Blades.

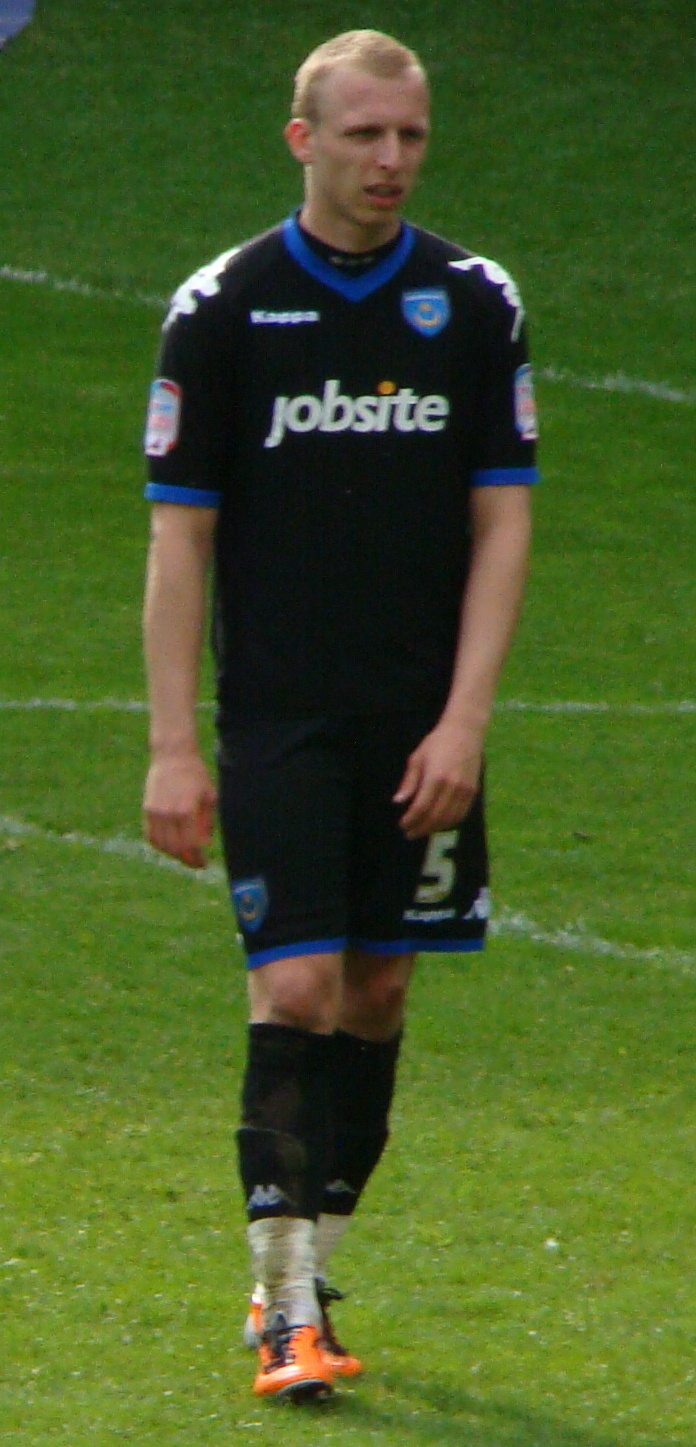
De Laet playing for Portsmouth against Cardiff City on 16 April 2011

On 17 November 2010, De Laet joined Championship team Preston North End on a 28-day loan after an injury to first-team defender Callum Davidson. On 14 January 2011, De Laet joined Portsmouth of the Championship on loan until the end of the 2010–11 season.

==== Norwich City loan ====
On 17 June 2011, De Laet joined newly promoted Premier League side Norwich City on loan until the end of the 2011–12 season. He made his debut in a 1–1 draw at Wigan Athletic, conceding the penalty for the Wigan goal. However, he redeemed himself with a number of excellent blocks to retain the scoreline. On 21 August, he scored his first goal for Norwich against former club Stoke City in a 1–1 draw. This was also De Laet's first senior goal. De Laet was sidelined with a back injury whilst at Norwich. He made his return from injury on 27 December 2011 against Tottenham Hotspur in a 2–0 loss. On 18 January 2012, he returned to United after Norwich cancelled his loan.

=== Leicester City ===
On 14 May 2012, De Laet signed a three-year deal with Leicester City. He was joined at Leicester by fellow United player Matty James, who signed on the same day. De Laet scored his first goal for Leicester shortly before half time in the 6–1 thrashing of Huddersfield Town on 1 January 2013. He scored his second just four days later, against Burton Albion in the first round of the FA Cup. De Laet ended his first season with Leicester having played 46 games and scoring twice in all competitions, steering City into the Championship play-offs. In the 2013–14 season, he helped Leicester gain promotion back to the top flight playing regularly in the first team once more. De Laet featured 35 times scoring two goals.

In the 2015–16 season, De Laet started the first seven games for Leicester, scoring his last goal for the club in a 3–2 win over Aston Villa on 13 September 2015. He eventually lost his place in the first team to Danny Simpson.

==== Middlesbrough loan ====
On 1 February 2016, De Laet joined Championship side Middlesbrough on loan for the remainder of the 2015–16 season. He helped Middlesbrough achieve promotion on the final day of the season, after a 1–1 draw with Brighton & Hove Albion. This meant that De Laet achieved the unique feat of playing with a club winning promotion from the Championship and then winning the Premier League title, courtesy of his 12 league appearances for Leicester in the same season.

=== Aston Villa ===
On 23 August 2016, De Laet signed a three-year deal with Championship club Aston Villa. On 14 September 2016, he was injured in the 67th minute in a 1–1 league game against Brentford. Scans later revealed the injury to be a season-ending one.

==== Royal Antwerp loan ====
On 23 January 2018, De Laet rejoined Royal Antwerp on loan for the remainder of the season.

==== Melbourne City loan ====
In September 2018, De Laet completed a loan move to Melbourne City of the A-League, reuniting with former Manchester United reserve team manager Warren Joyce. De Laet, who was stand-in captain at the time, scored on debut in the Melbourne Derby in front of 40,504 supporters, pouncing on a rebound in the 40th minute after a controversial penalty, awarded by the VAR, was missed.

In early 2019, Joyce shifted De Laet from defense to centre-forward with Ritchie scoring two goals in this position on 22 January 2019 against Western Sydney Wanderers as City defeated the Wanderers 4–3. De Laet's first goal in this match set a new club record for fastest ever goal in the A-League. Ritchie latched onto a loose back-pass from Keanu Baccus, took one touch to round WSW goalkeeper Nicholas Suman, before slotting the ball into the back of an empty net on the 30-second mark. The time beat Richard Garcia's previous club record of 34 seconds, set when the team was still named Melbourne Heart prior to the 2014 City Football Group takeover. The following day, De Laet revealed in an interview that the role of striker was not unfamiliar to him as Joyce used to play him in that role at the Manchester United Reserves when he was a youngster.

He was released by Aston Villa at the end of the 2018–19 season.

=== Return to Royal Antwerp ===
On 29 June 2019, after he was released by Aston Villa, it was announced by Royal Antwerp that he would sign permanently with the club that his career began at.

During the 2022–23 season, De Laet was part of the squad that won the domestic double, including the club's first league title in 66 years.

== International career ==
A few days after his Manchester United debut, De Laet was called up for Belgium's Kirin Cup matches against Chile and Japan. He made his debut in the match against Chile on 29 May 2009. De Laet was a regular for the under-21s in the 2011 European Championship qualifying.

== Career statistics ==
As of match played 17 March 2024

Appearances and goals by club, season and competition
Club	Season	League			National cup (Note: Includes FA Cup, FFA Cup, Belgian Cup)		League cup (Note: Includes Football League Cup)		Continental		Other		Total	
Club	Season	Division	Apps	Goals	Apps	Goals	Apps	Goals	Apps	Goals	Apps	Goals	Apps	Goals
Royal Antwerp	2006–07	Belgian Second Division	3	0	0	0	—		—		5 (Note: Appearances in Belgian Pro League promotion play-offs)	0	8	0
Royal Antwerp	2007–08	Belgian Second Division	1	0	0	0	—		—		—		1	0
Royal Antwerp	Total		4	0	0	0	—		—		5	0	9	0
Stoke City	2007–08	Championship	0	0	0	0	0	0	—		—		0	0
Stoke City	2008–09	Premier League	0	0	0	0	0	0	—		—		0	0
Stoke City	Total		0	0	0	0	0	0	—		—		0	0
Wrexham (loan)	2008–09	Football Conference	3	0	0	0	—		—		—		3	0
Manchester United	2008–09	Premier League	1	0	0	0	0	0	0	0	0	0	1	0
Manchester United	2009–10	Premier League	2	0	0	0	3	0	0	0	0	0	5	0
Manchester United	2010–11	Premier League	0	0	0	0	0	0	0	0	0	0	0	0
Manchester United	2011–12	Premier League	0	0	0	0	0	0	0	0	0	0	0	0
Manchester United	Total		3	0	0	0	3	0	0	0	0	0	6	0
Sheffield United (loan)	2010–11	Championship	6	0	0	0	0	0	—		—		6	0
Preston North End (loan)	2010–11	Championship	5	0	0	0	0	0	—		—		5	0
Portsmouth (loan)	2010–11	Championship	22	0	0	0	0	0	—		—		22	0
Norwich City (loan)	2011–12	Premier League	6	1	0	0	1	0	—		—		7	1
Leicester City	2012–13	Championship	41	1	3	1	2	0	—		2 (Note: Appearances in Championship play-offs)	0	48	2
Leicester City	2013–14	Championship	36	2	1	0	1	0	—		—		38	2
Leicester City	2014–15	Premier League	26	0	2	0	0	0	—		—		28	0
Leicester City	2015–16	Premier League	12	1	1	0	2	0	—		—		15	1
Leicester City	Total		115	4	7	1	6	0	—		2	0	129	5
Middlesbrough (loan)	2015–16	Championship	10	0	0	0	0	0	—		—		10	0
Aston Villa	2016–17	Championship	3	0	0	0	0	0	—		—		3	0
Aston Villa	2017–18	Championship	5	0	1	0	3	0	—		—		9	0
Aston Villa	2018–19	Championship	0	0	0	0	2	0	—		—		2	0
Aston Villa	Total		8	0	1	0	5	0	—		—		13	0
Royal Antwerp (loan)	2017–18	Belgian Pro League	6	0	0	0	—		—		8 (Note: Appearances in Belgian Pro League Europa League play-offs)	0	14	0
Melbourne City (loan)	2018–19	A-League	25	7	1	0	—		—		—		26	7
Royal Antwerp	2019–20	Belgian Pro League	22	0	4	1	—		2 (Note: Appearances in UEFA Europa League)	0	—		28	1
Royal Antwerp	2020–21	Belgian Pro League	39	0	2	1	—		7	1	—		48	2
Royal Antwerp	2021–22	Belgian Pro League	33	1	1	0	—		8	0	—		42	1
Royal Antwerp	2022–23	Belgian Pro League	32	1	6	1	—		6 (Note: Appearances in UEFA Europa Conference League)	0	—		44	2
Royal Antwerp	2023–24	Belgian Pro League	15	0	2	1	—		6 (Note: Appearances in UEFA Champions League)	0	1 (Note: Appearance in Belgian Super Cup)	0	24	1
Royal Antwerp	Total		141	2	15	4	—		29	1	1	0	186	7
Career total			354	14	24	5	14	0	29	1	16	0	437	20

== Honours ==
Leicester City

- Premier League: 2015–16
- Football League Championship: 2013–14

Middlesbrough

- Football League Championship runner-up: 2015–16

Royal Antwerp

- Belgian Pro League: 2022–23
- Belgian Cup: 2019–20, 2022–23
- Belgian Super Cup: 2023

Individual

- Denzil Haroun Reserve Team Player of the Year: 2009–10
