= Matty James =

English footballer (born 1991)

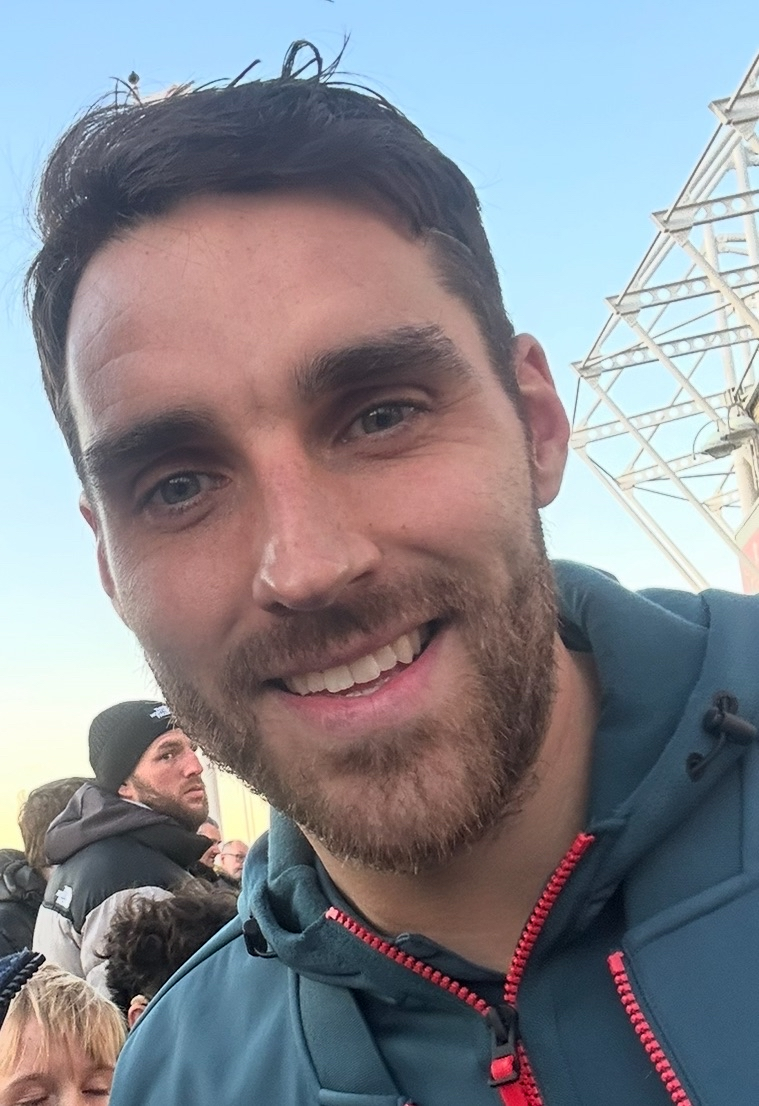
- James with Wrexham in 2025

Personal information
- Full name: Matthew Lee James
- Date of birth: 22 July 1991 (age 35)
- Place of birth: Bacup, England
- Height: 5 ft 11 in (1.81 m)
- Position: Midfielder

Team information
- Current team: Wrexham
- Number: 37

Youth career
- 2007–2010: Manchester United

Senior career*
Years	Team	Apps	(Gls)
2009–2012	Manchester United	0	(0)
2010	→ Preston North End (loan)	18	(2)
2010–2011	→ Preston North End (loan)	10	(0)
2012–2021	Leicester City	101	(4)
2017	→ Barnsley (loan)	18	(1)
2020–2021	→ Barnsley (loan)	15	(0)
2021	→ Coventry City (loan)	23	(3)
2021–2024	Bristol City	104	(7)
2024–	Wrexham	63	(3)

International career^{‡}
2007	England U16	5	(0)
2007–2008	England U17	10	(0)
2009–2010	England U19	13	(0)
2009	England U20	6	(0)
- * Club domestic league appearances and goals as of 17:10, 27 February 2026 (UTC) ‡ National team caps and goals as of 22:17, 4 January 2022 (UTC)

Matthew Lee James (born 22 July 1991) is an English professional footballer who plays for EFL Championship club Wrexham. His regular position is in midfield, but he can play in defence when required. James began his career with Manchester United, where his brother Reece also came through the youth ranks, but left the club for a spell on loan at Preston North End before joining Leicester City on a permanent basis in 2012.

== Club career ==
=== Manchester United ===
Born in Bacup, Lancashire, James joined the Manchester United Academy at an early age, and made his first appearance for the under-18 side in October 2005, at the age of 14. His next appearance for the under-18s came just over a year later, when he came on as a substitute for Magnus Eikrem in a Premier Academy League fixture against Manchester City. He made a further eight appearances for the under-18s during the 2006–07 season, before establishing himself as a regular in the team in 2007–08, although he began the season filling in in defense. James scored his first goals in a Manchester United shirt during the 2007–08 season, both of them in the league. After making his first appearance for the reserve team in November 2007, James became a regular for the reserves during the 2008–09 season, while remaining a relative mainstay in the under-18 side. At the end of a season in which he had made 22 appearances for the reserves and 14 for the under-18s, James received his first call-up to the Manchester United senior team on 24 May 2009. Given the number 47 jersey, James was named on the bench for the match, but did not take to the field.

James signed his first professional contract with Manchester United in July 2009, before playing in the 1–0 win over Bolton Wanderers in the final of the 2008–09 Lancashire Senior Cup. Prior to the first team's match against Barnsley in the Fourth Round of the League Cup on 27 October 2009, James was given a new squad number (43), and was named as an unused substitute.

=== Preston North End (loan) ===
In February 2010, James followed in the footsteps of Manchester United teammate Danny Welbeck by signing on loan with Preston North End until the end of the 2009–10 season. He went straight into the Preston first-team for their match against Sheffield United on 9 February 2010, and scored within 10 minutes as his deflected shot from outside the penalty area beat Sheffield United goalkeeper Ian Bennett. James returned to Manchester United at the end of the 2009–10 season, but rejoined Preston on a season-long loan on 2 July 2010.

On 30 December 2010, Sir Alex Ferguson chose to recall Ritchie De Laet, Joshua King and James from their loans at Preston after the sacking of his son. De Laet and King returned immediately, but due to the terms of James' loan, he did not return to Manchester United until 4 January 2011.

=== Leicester City ===
==== 2012–13 season ====
On 15 May 2012, James and De Laet moved to Leicester City in a double transfer, for which the fee was undisclosed. The pair each signed three-year contracts. James, along with De Laet and Jamie Vardy, made his competitive debut for Leicester against Torquay United, scoring his first goal for the club (and Leicester's third of the night) as the Foxes ran out 4–0 winners in the League Cup tie. James added another 3 goals (all in the league) over the course of the season, including one in the 3–2 win against Nottingham Forest on the final day of the season, helping Leicester to the final play-off position. James started both legs of the eventual 3–2 aggregate defeat to Watford in the Championship play-off semi-final.

==== 2013–14 season ====
James found himself starting more games during the 2013–14 season, being in the line-up for Leicester's first five league games before being controversially shown the first red card of his career in the 1–2 defeat to Charlton Athletic, after being shown two yellow cards. On 8 February 2014, James scored his only goal of the season, helping Leicester come from 2–0 down to draw 2–2 with Watford. James played 35 times in the league as Leicester won promotion to the Premier League, collecting the Championship trophy along the way.

==== 2014–15 season ====
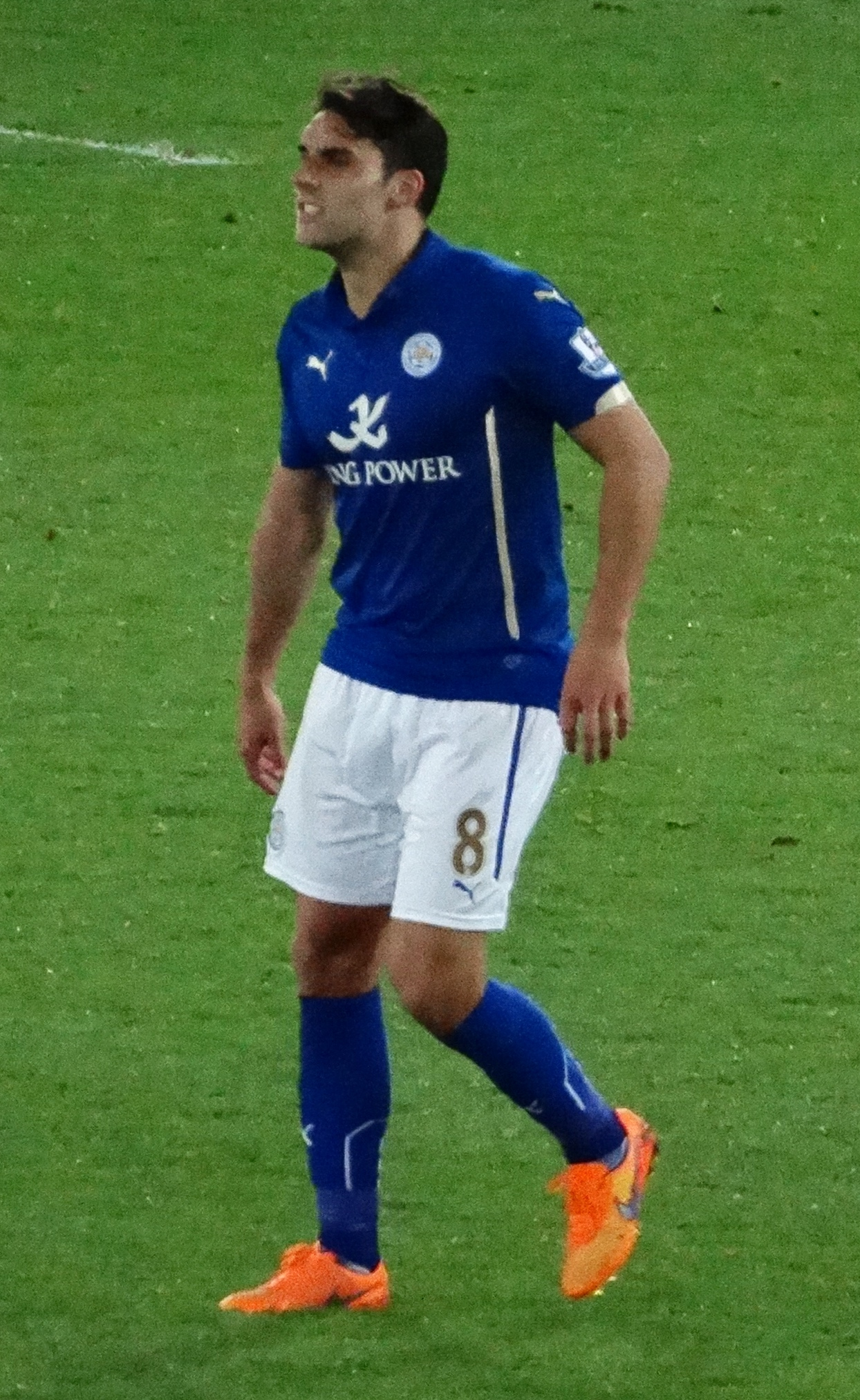
James playing for Leicester City in 2015.

Having missed the start of the season through injury, James made his first Premier League appearance on 21 September 2014, as a second-half substitute in a 5–3 victory against his former club, Manchester United. On 10 January 2015, James picked up the second red card of his career in the 1–0 victory over Aston Villa, he was given a straight red following a strong challenge on Jores Okore and an ensuing altercation with Ciaran Clark that resulted in Clark receiving a second yellow card himself. In a 2–0 win over Southampton on 9 May, James ruptured his anterior ligaments and was ruled out for between six and nine months.

==== 2015–16 season ====
Due to his injury, James missed the entire 2015–16 campaign, in which the club became the Premier League champions.

==== 2016–17 season ====
At the beginning of the season, James played with Leicester City U23 squad to regain fitness. On 26 November 2016, James returned to the first-team squad against Middlesbrough.

On 25 January 2017, he joined Barnsley on a loan deal until the summer of 2017.

==== 2017–18 season ====
On 19 August 2017, James made his first start for the club since May 2015 in a 2–0 win over Brighton & Hove Albion.

==== 2020–21 season ====
On 16 October 2020 he returned to Barnsley on loan.

On 6 January 2021, James joined Championship side Coventry City on loan. He scored his first goal for Coventry on 27 February 2021 in a 1–1 draw against Blackburn Rovers. On 21 May 2021 Leicester announced his departure from the club.

=== Bristol City ===
On 23 June 2021, James joined Championship club Bristol City on a three-year deal.

On 11 May 2024, James was released from Bristol City following the expiration of his contract at the end of the 2023–24 Championship season.

=== Wrexham ===
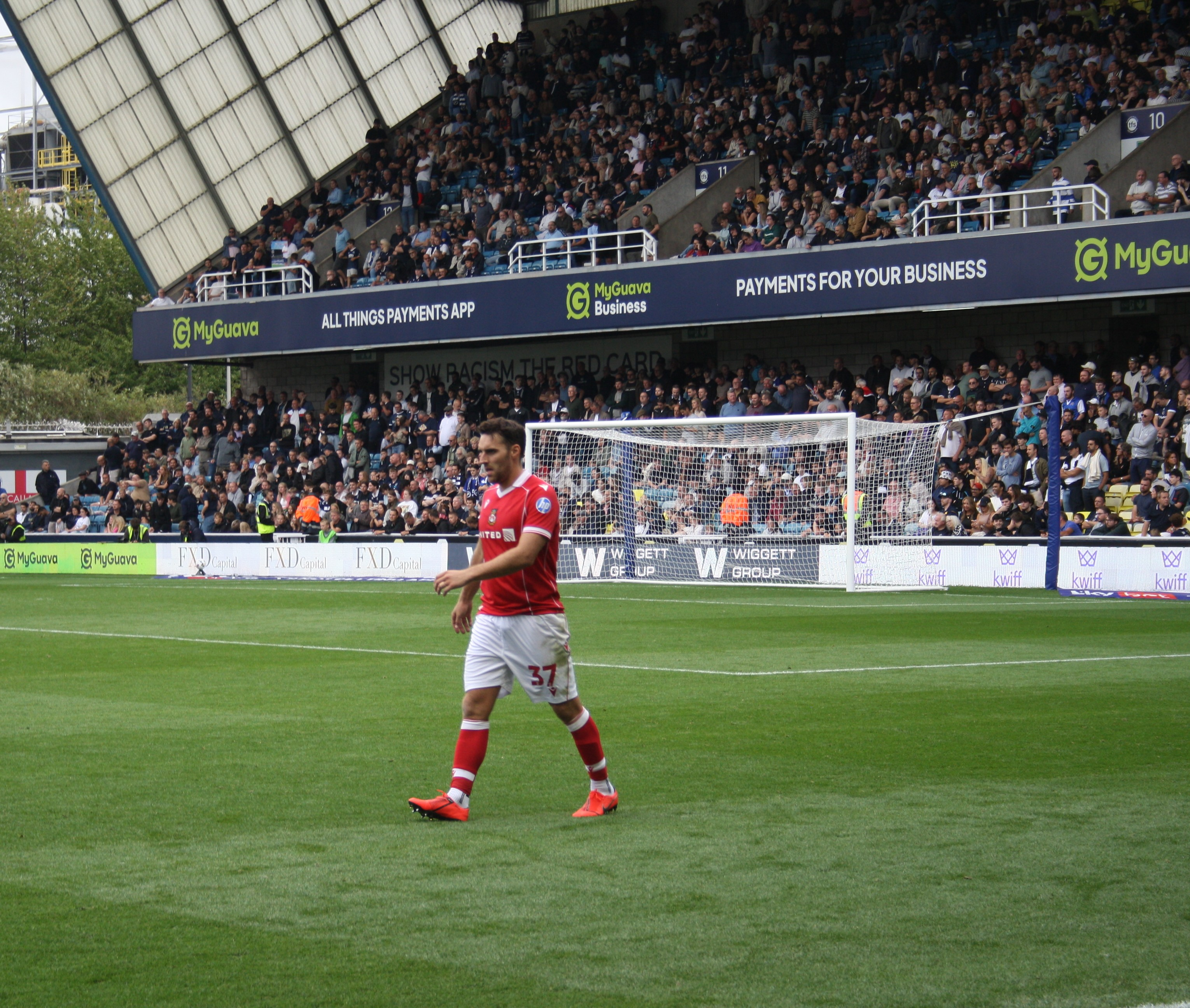
James playing for Wrexham in 2025.

On 25 October 2024, it was announced James had signed a short-term deal at Wrexham.

On 19 December 2024, it was announced James had signed an extension at Wrexham through the 2025–26 season.

== International career ==
James has played regularly for the England Under-16s and Under-17s sides, and in 2009 he was called up to the Under-19s for the 2009 UEFA European Under-19 Championship. He was named captain and in his first game as skipper, England recorded a 3–2 victory in their opening game against Austria.

== Personal life ==
James' father, Linton James, played non-league football for Bacup Borough and later worked as assistant manager of the club. His younger brother, Reece James, currently plays for Rotherham United in the EFL League One. He was educated at Fearns Community Sports College.

He donated two therapy tilt-in space chairs, worth about £2000, to Fairfield General Hospital where his mother Maxine works as a nurse, in 2020.

== Career statistics ==
As of match played 7 August 2026

Appearances and goals by club, season and competition
Club	Season	League			FA Cup		League Cup		Other		Total	
Club	Season	Division	Apps	Goals	Apps	Goals	Apps	Goals	Apps	Goals	Apps	Goals
Manchester United	2009–10	Premier League	0	0	0	0	0	0	—		0	0
Manchester United	2010–11	Premier League	0	0	0	0	0	0	—		0	0
Manchester United	2011–12	Premier League	0	0	0	0	0	0	—		0	0
Manchester United	Total		0	0	0	0	0	0	0	0	0	0
Preston North End (loan)	2009–10	Championship	18	2	0	0	0	0	—		18	2
Preston North End (loan)	2010–11	Championship	10	0	0	0	2	1	—		12	1
Leicester City	2012–13	Championship	24	3	2	0	2	1	2 (Note: Appearances in the 2013 Football League play-offs)	0	30	4
Leicester City	2013–14	Championship	35	1	1	0	4	0	—		40	1
Leicester City	2014–15	Premier League	27	0	2	0	0	0	—		29	0
Leicester City	2015–16	Premier League	0	0	0	0	0	0	—		0	0
Leicester City	2016–17	Premier League	1	0	0	0	0	0	—		1	0
Leicester City	2017–18	Premier League	13	0	2	0	0	0	—		15	0
Leicester City	2018–19	Premier League	0	0	1	0	0	0	—		1	0
Leicester City	2019–20	Premier League	1	0	0	0	0	0	—		1	0
Leicester City	2020–21	Premier League	0	0	—		0	0	—		0	0
Leicester City	Total		101	4	8	0	6	1	2	0	117	5
Leicester City U23s	2016—17	—	—	—	—	—	—	—	2 (Note: Appearances in the EFL Trophy)	0	2	0
Barnsley (loan)	2016–17	Championship	18	1	0	0	0	0	—		18	1
Leicester City U21s	2019—20	—	—	—	—	—	—	—	1	0	1	0
Barnsley (loan)	2020–21	Championship	15	0	0	0	0	0	—		15	0
Coventry City (loan)	2020–21	Championship	23	3	1	0	0	0	—		24	3
Bristol City	2021–22	Championship	33	1	0	0	0	0	—		33	1
Bristol City	2022–23	Championship	35	3	3	0	1	0	—		39	0
Bristol City	2023–24	Championship	36	3	4	0	3	0	—		43	3
Bristol City	Total		104	7	7	0	4	0	0	0	115	7
Wrexham	2024–25	League One	32	2	0	0	0	0	1	0	33	2
Wrexham	2025–26	Championship	31	1	0	0	2	0	—		33	1
Wrexham	2026–27	Championship	0	0	0	0	1	0	0	0	1	0
Wrexham	Total		63	3	0	0	3	0	1	0	67	3
Career total			352	20	16	0	15	2	6	0	389	22

== Honours ==
Leicester City

- Football League Championship: 2013–14

Wrexham

- EFL League One runner up: 2024-25

Individual

- Leicester City Young Player of the Season: 2013–14
