= Danny Drinkwater =

English footballer (born 1990)

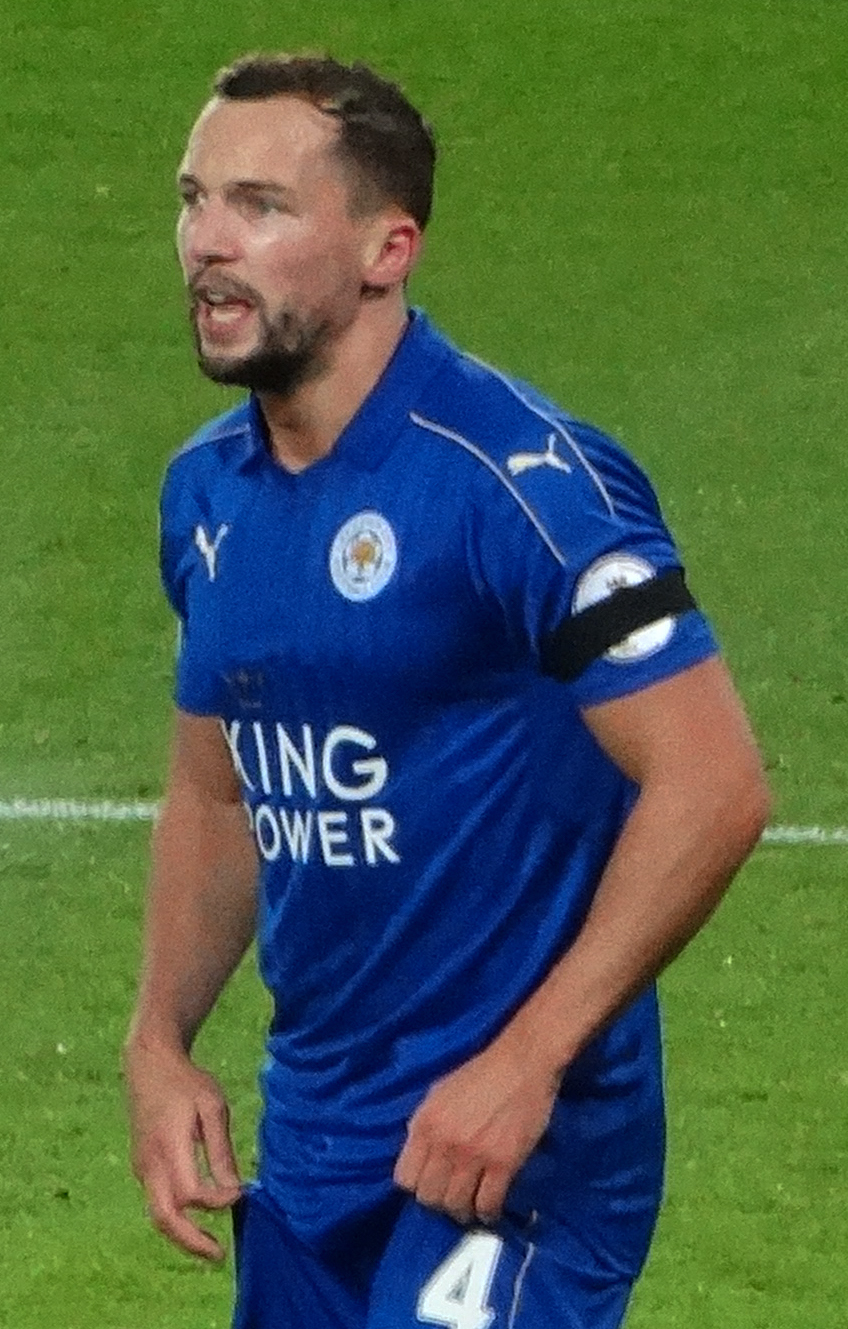
- Drinkwater with Leicester City in 2016

Personal information
- Full name: Daniel Noel Drinkwater
- Date of birth: 5 March 1990 (age 36)
- Place of birth: Manchester, England
- Height: 5 ft 10 in (1.78 m)
- Position: Midfielder

Youth career
- 1999–2009: Manchester United

Senior career*
Years	Team	Apps	(Gls)
2009–2012	Manchester United	0	(0)
2009–2010	→ Huddersfield Town (loan)	33	(2)
2010–2011	→ Cardiff City (loan)	9	(0)
2011	→ Watford (loan)	12	(0)
2011–2012	→ Barnsley (loan)	17	(1)
2012–2017	Leicester City	193	(13)
2017–2022	Chelsea	12	(1)
2019–2020	→ Burnley (loan)	1	(0)
2020	→ Aston Villa (loan)	4	(0)
2021	→ Kasımpaşa (loan)	11	(0)
2021–2022	→ Reading (loan)	33	(1)
Total		325	(18)

International career
2007–2008	England U18	2	(1)
2008–2009	England U19	12	(0)
2016	England	3	(0)
- * Club domestic league appearances and goals

Daniel Noel Drinkwater (born 5 March 1990) is an English former professional footballer who played as a midfielder.

Having come through the youth academy at Manchester United, he spent time on loan with Huddersfield Town, Cardiff City, Watford and Barnsley. He moved to Leicester City in 2012, where he was part of Leicester’s side that was promoted to the top flight and later part of their Premier League title-winning team in 2016. After moving to Chelsea in 2017 and making few appearances for the London-based club, he spent the remainder of his career on loan at Burnley, Aston Villa, Kasımpaşan and Reading. He departed Chelsea in June 2022, following the expiration of his contract.

Drinkwater also played internationally for England at under-18, under-19 and senior levels, winning three caps in 2016 for the latter.

== Club career ==
=== Manchester United ===
Born in Manchester, Drinkwater joined the Manchester United academy at the age of nine, progressing through the ranks before earning a trainee contract in July 2006. In his first season at the club, he became a regular in the Manchester United under-18 team, making 27 appearances and scoring two goals. He received his first taste of reserve team action that same season, coming off the bench to replace Ritchie Jones in a 5–2 Premier Reserve League win at home to Wigan Athletic. The following season, Drinkwater consolidated his position in the under-18s team while increasing his presence in the reserves. In the 2008 Lancashire Senior Cup final against Liverpool on 31 July 2008, he came on as a 56th-minute substitute for Rodrigo Possebon before scoring the winning goal three minutes from full-time. In the 2008–09 season, Drinkwater became a regular in the reserve team, making 18 appearances and getting on the scoresheet twice.

At the end of the season, he was called up to the Manchester United first team for their dead rubber league match against Hull City on 24 May 2009. He was named on the bench, but did not take to the field.

==== Loan to Huddersfield Town ====
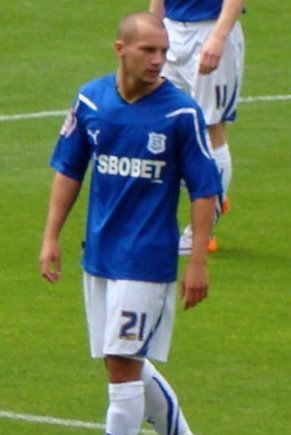
Drinkwater with Cardiff City in 2010

To gain first-team experience, on 14 August 2009, Drinkwater joined Huddersfield Town on loan for the duration of the 2009–10 season. He made his debut for the club the very next day, coming on in the 72nd minute for Gary Roberts in a 3–1 win at home to Southampton. His first goal for Huddersfield came three days later in a 7–1 home win over Brighton & Hove Albion, five minutes after coming on as a 64th-minute substitute. He made his first start for Huddersfield in a 1–0 defeat at Bristol Rovers on 22 August.

==== Loan to Cardiff City ====
On 8 July 2010, Manchester United agreed for Drinkwater to spend a season-long loan spell at Cardiff City. As they were under a transfer embargo at the time, Cardiff said that the move would be completed once this had been lifted. The move was eventually confirmed on 6 August 2010, once the embargo had been removed. His competitive debut for Cardiff came two days later, in their 1–1 home draw with Sheffield United on the opening day of the 2010–11 Football League season.

Despite the loan having originally been intended to last the entire season, Manchester United recalled Drinkwater from Cardiff on 25 January 2011. During his time with Cardiff, he made 12 appearances, including nine in the Championship.

==== Loan to Watford ====
Just three days after his return to Manchester United, Drinkwater joined Watford on 28 January 2011 on loan until the end of the season.

==== Loan to Barnsley ====
On 23 August 2011, Drinkwater joined Barnsley on loan until 2 January 2012, which was later extended until 30 June 2012. He made 17 Championship appearances for the Tykes, scoring in a 5–3 loss at his former team Cardiff on 22 October.

=== Leicester City ===
On 20 January 2012, Drinkwater joined Leicester City from Manchester United for an undisclosed fee.

After being named Championship Player of the Month for December 2013, he was also one of three players who received a nomination for the Championship Player of the Year Award. Drinkwater had his most successful year as a professional, scoring seven goals and being named to the PFA Championship Team of the Year alongside teammates Kasper Schmeichel and Wes Morgan, as Leicester were promoted to the Premier League after winning the Championship. On 17 June 2014, he signed a new four-year deal with Leicester after helping the Foxes win promotion to the Premier League for the first time in ten years.

Drinkwater played consistently as the Foxes won the Premier League title in 2015–16, alongside his midfield partners N'Golo Kanté, Marc Albrighton and Riyad Mahrez. He scored his first top-flight goal on 23 January 2016, to open a 3–0 win over Stoke City at the King Power Stadium.

On 25 August 2016, Drinkwater signed a contract to remain with the club until 2021.

=== Chelsea ===
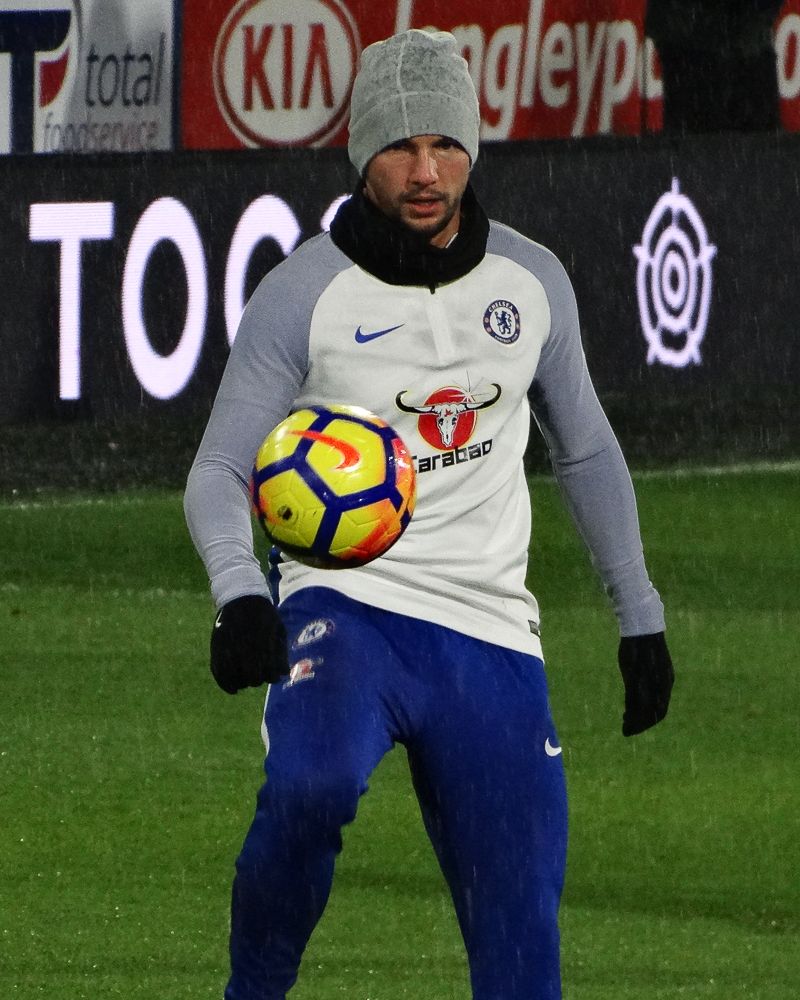
Drinkwater training with Chelsea in 2017

On 1 September 2017, Drinkwater signed for reigning Premier League champions Chelsea on a five-year contract, for a £35 million fee. Due to a thigh injury that ruled him out previously, he made his debut on 25 October in the last 16 of the EFL Cup, playing an hour of a 2–1 home win over Everton. Drinkwater made his first Premier League start for the Blues in a 1–1 draw against Liverpool at Anfield on 25 November. On 30 December, he scored his first and only goal for Chelsea, a well-executed half volley, in a 5–0 home win over Stoke City. His first season at Chelsea saw him make 22 appearances in all competitions, including four in the Blues' triumphant FA Cup campaign. However, injury meant Drinkwater was not involved in the final, against his old club Manchester United.

With the arrival of new manager Maurizio Sarri, Drinkwater made no league appearances at all in the 2018–19 season. His only appearance in all competitions was during the 2018 FA Community Shield against Manchester City in August 2018.

In May 2020, ESPN named Drinkwater's move to Chelsea as the second-worst transfer in Premier League history, behind only Ali Dia's move to Southampton. Drinkwater was not allocated a squad number for the 2020–21 season, with his former number 6 allocated to new signing Thiago Silva. In an interview with The Telegraph in September 2020, he spoke of his off-field issues and stated his desire to get his career back on track, including the possibility of playing abroad.

On 10 June 2022, Chelsea announced that Drinkwater would leave the club when his contract expired at the end of June.

==== Loan to Burnley ====
Drinkwater signed for Premier League club Burnley on 8 August 2019 on loan until 6 January 2020. He made his Burnley debut on 28 August 2019, in a 3–1 EFL Cup defeat to Sunderland.

On 31 August 2019, he was allegedly attacked outside a nightclub, resulting in injury and two weeks out-of-action. He did not make his league debut until 3 December, in a 4–1 loss to Manchester City. Drinkwater was unable to get back into the team after that game, and on 3 January 2020, Burnley manager Sean Dyche confirmed that Burnley would not extend his loan and he would return to Chelsea.

==== Loan to Aston Villa ====
On 7 January 2020, Drinkwater signed for Aston Villa on loan until the end of the 2019–20 season. Aston Villa manager Dean Smith watched Drinkwater train with the team before confirming his loan deal. Smith stated that he was confident that Drinkwater had put the issues that had affected his previous loan behind him and he would be ready to provide cover for the injured John McGinn. On 11 March, Drinkwater was told to leave Aston Villa's training ground following an altercation with teammate Jota, in which Drinkwater reportedly directed a headbutt at the player.

==== Loan to Kasımpaşa ====
On 18 January 2021, Drinkwater signed for Turkish club Kasımpaşa on loan until the end of the season. He made his debut as a substitute against Göztepe on 28 February.

==== Loan to Reading ====
On 30 August 2021, Drinkwater joined Reading on loan until the end of the season. He scored his first goal for the club on 27 November in a 3–2 win against Swansea City.

=== Retirement ===
On 30 October 2023, Drinkwater announced his retirement from professional football, aged 33, having been without a club for over a year.

== International career ==
Drinkwater made his debut for the England under-18 team in their 2–0 win over Ghana, where he scored the second goal of the match. His second under-18 cap came in a 2–0 win over Austria.

He also made appearances for the England under-19s between 2008 and 2009. His first appearance came in their match against Albania on 8 October 2008. His final appearance for the England under-19s came against Ukraine on 2 August 2009.

He was called up to the full England squad for the first time on 17 March 2016, ahead of friendlies against Germany and the Netherlands. He made his debut 12 days later in the latter match, a 2–1 loss at Wembley Stadium in which he was man of the match. Drinkwater was named in Roy Hodgson's 26-man provisional squad for UEFA Euro 2016 but was one of three players axed for the final selection.

== Personal life ==
In April 2019, Drinkwater was charged with drunk-driving after crashing his Range Rover into a wall in Mere, Cheshire. There were two other passengers in the car at the time of the accident, who were treated for minor injuries. Drinkwater appeared at Stockport Magistrates' Court on 13 May, where he pleaded guilty to drink-driving and received a 20-month driving ban.

In September 2019, Drinkwater was attacked outside a Manchester nightclub, allegedly following a dispute with fellow footballer Kgosi Ntlhe, which resulted in ankle ligament damage.

As of July 2024, Drinkwater was working as a property developer following his retirement from playing.

== Career statistics ==
=== Club ===
Appearances and goals by club, season and competition
Club	Season	League			National cup (Note: Includes FA Cup)		League cup (Note: Includes Football League/EFL Cup)		Europe		Other		Total	
Club	Season	Division	Apps	Goals	Apps	Goals	Apps	Goals	Apps	Goals	Apps	Goals	Apps	Goals
Manchester United	2008–09	Premier League	0	0	0	0	0	0	0	0	0	0	0	0
Manchester United	2009–10	Premier League	—		—		—		—		0	0	0	0
Manchester United	2010–11	Premier League	0	0	—		—		—		—		0	0
Manchester United	2011–12	Premier League	0	0	—		—		—		0	0	0	0
Manchester United	Total		0	0	0	0	0	0	0	0	0	0	0	0
Huddersfield Town (loan)	2009–10	League One	33	2	1	0	1	0	—		2 (Note: Appearances in League One play-offs)	0	37	2
Cardiff City (loan)	2010–11	Championship	9	0	1	0	2	0	—		—		12	0
Watford (loan)	2010–11	Championship	12	0	—		—		—		—		12	0
Barnsley (loan)	2011–12	Championship	17	1	1	0	—		—		—		18	1
Leicester City	2011–12	Championship	19	2	—		—		—		—		19	2
Leicester City	2012–13	Championship	42	1	1	0	1	0	—		2 (Note: Appearances in Championship play-offs)	0	46	1
Leicester City	2013–14	Championship	45	7	0	0	4	1	—		—		49	8
Leicester City	2014–15	Premier League	23	0	1	0	0	0	—		—		24	0
Leicester City	2015–16	Premier League	35	2	1	0	1	0	—		—		37	2
Leicester City	2016–17	Premier League	29	1	2	0	1	0	10 (Note: Appearances in UEFA Champions League)	0	1 (Note: Appearance in FA Community Shield)	0	43	1
Leicester City	Total		193	13	5	0	7	1	10	0	3	0	218	14
Chelsea	2017–18	Premier League	12	1	4	0	3	0	3	0	—		22	1
Chelsea	2018–19	Premier League	0	0	0	0	0	0	0	0	1	0	1	0
Chelsea	2019–20	Premier League	0	0	0	0	0	0	0	0	—		0	0
Chelsea	2020–21	Premier League	0	0	0	0	0	0	0	0	—		0	0
Chelsea	2021–22	Premier League	0	0	0	0	0	0	0	0	—		0	0
Chelsea	Total		12	1	4	0	3	0	3	0	1	0	23	1
Burnley (loan)	2019–20	Premier League	1	0	0	0	1	0	—		—		2	0
Aston Villa (loan)	2019–20	Premier League	4	0	—		—		—		—		4	0
Chelsea U23	2020–21	—			—		—		—		1 (Note: Appearance in EFL Trophy)	0	1	0
Kasımpaşa (loan)	2020–21	Süper Lig	11	0	—		—		—		—		11	0
Reading (loan)	2021–22	Championship	33	1	1	0	—		—		—		34	1
Career total			325	18	13	0	14	1	13	0	7	0	372	19

=== International ===
Appearances and goals by national team and year
National team	Year	Apps	Goals
England	2016	3	0
Total		3	0

== Honours ==
Leicester City

- Premier League: 2015–16
- Football League Championship: 2013–14

Chelsea

- FA Cup: 2017–18

England U19

- UEFA European Under-19 Championship runner-up: 2009

Individual

- PFA Team of the Year: 2013–14 Championship
- Football League Championship Player of the Month: December 2013
- Leicester City Player of the Season: 2013–14
- Leicester City Goal of the Season: 2013–14
