= Nikola Kolarov =

Serbian footballer

Personal information
- Full name: Nikola Kolarov
- Date of birth: 14 March 1983 (age 43)
- Place of birth: Belgrade, SFR Yugoslavia
- Height: 1.80 m (5 ft 11 in)
- Position: Defender

Senior career*
Years	Team	Apps	(Gls)
2002–2005	Čukarički	2	(0)
2003–2004	→ Komgrap (loan)	14	(0)
2004	→ Mačva Šabac (loan)	2	(0)
2006	Srem Jakovo	11	(0)
2006–2007	Hajduk Beograd	33	(0)
2008–2009	Borac Banja Luka	23	(0)
2009–2010	Olimpik Sarajevo	40	(0)
2011	KSZO Ostrowiec	12	(0)
2011–2012	Inđija	26	(0)
Total		163	(0)
- * Club domestic league appearances and goals

Nikola Kolarov (Serbian Cyrillic: Никола Коларов; born 14 March 1983) is a Serbian former professional footballer who played as a defender. He is the older brother of Serbia international Aleksandar Kolarov.
