= Bojil Kolarov =

Bulgarian writer and historian (born 1972)

Bojil Kolarov (Bulgarian: Божил Коларов) is a Bulgarian writer specializing in the study of the origins and history of Hindu culture and philosophy. He was born in 1972 in Sofia (Bulgaria) and graduated in 1997 in philosophy and biology from Sofia University.

His published works include :

- India in Danger
- The Decline of Spiritual Man ISBN 954-642-176-6
- The Two Europes : Slavonic Idea in 21st Century

He has also written many independent articles about political science, cultural studies and parapsychology.

He has travelled to many countries including India, where he visited a majority of holy Hindu places. He is interested in Indian philosophy, yoga and meditation, which he studied in ashrams in Hrishikesh.

The central idea in his study is the superiority of Hindu tradition in relation to the outside forces that have been in conflict with it for the past millennium.
