= Aleksandar Kolarov =

Serbian footballer (born 1985)

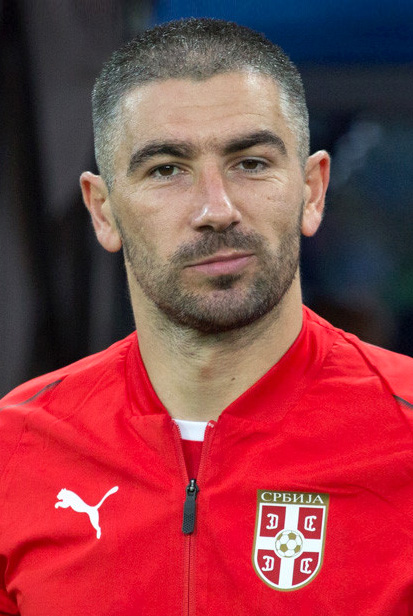
- Kolarov with Serbia in 2018

Personal information
- Full name: Aleksandar Kolarov
- Date of birth: 10 November 1985 (age 41)
- Place of birth: Belgrade, SR Serbia, SFR Yugoslavia
- Height: 1.87 m (6 ft 2 in)
- Position: Left back

Team information
- Current team: Inter Milan (assistant)

Youth career
- 1997–2001: Red Star Belgrade
- 2001: Obilić
- 2001–2004: Čukarički

Senior career*
Years	Team	Apps	(Gls)
2004–2006	Čukarički	44	(2)
2006–2007	OFK Beograd	38	(5)
2007–2010	Lazio	82	(6)
2010–2017	Manchester City	165	(11)
2017–2020	Roma	100	(17)
2020–2022	Inter Milan	10	(0)
Total		439	(41)

International career
2006–2007	Serbia U21	11	(1)
2008–2020	Serbia	94	(11)

Managerial career
- 2024–2025: Serbia U21
- 2025–: Inter Milan (assistant)
- * Club domestic league appearances and goals

Aleksandar Kolarov (Serbian Cyrillic: Александар Коларов, Serbian pronunciation: [alɛksǎːndar kɔlǎrɔʋ]; born 10 November 1985) is a Serbian former professional footballer who played as a left back. He is the current assistant coach of Serie A club Inter Milan.

Kolarov began his career at Red Star Belgrade, but he did not break through and moved onto Čukarički in 2004. Two years later, he joined OFK Beograd before moving abroad for the first time by signing for Lazio in Serie A, where he won the Coppa Italia and Supercoppa Italiana in 2009. In 2010, he joined Manchester City, with which he won two Premier League titles, the FA Cup and the League Cup. He returned to Serie A in 2017 and saw out the remaining five years of his career with Roma and Inter Milan.

Kolarov made his senior international debut for Serbia in 2008 and earned 94 caps. Kolarov was a member of Serbia's squads for the 2008 Olympics, 2010 FIFA World Cup and the 2018 FIFA World Cup. He was named Serbian Player of the Year in 2011.

== Club career ==
=== Early career ===
Born in the Belgrade municipality of Zemun, Kolarov grew up in the village of Vojka near Stara Pazova, where he took his first steps in football by playing for the local village club for a year before joining the Red Star Belgrade youth system in March 1997. After four years at Red Star, dissatisfied with playing time, he moved to the youth system of Obilić, spending 8 months there before getting cut.

=== Čukarički ===
In 2004, 18-year-old Kolarov moved across Belgrade to Čukarički, which played in the top-tier Serbia-Montenegro League. Signing a three-year contract, he finished the 2003–04 season in the club's youth setup and during the summer of 2004 was introduced to the first-team squad. Making 27 league appearances in his debut season, the youngster left a good impression but could not help the beleaguered team avoid relegation.

Kolarov started the 2005–06 campaign for Čukarički in the second-tier league competition, but during the winter break controversially transferred to top-tier league club OFK Beograd.

=== OFK Beograd ===
Kolarov joined OFK Beograd in February 2006 and finished out the season with them, scoring his first league goal.

=== Lazio ===
In the summer of 2007, OFK Beograd sold Kolarov to Italian side Lazio (the third placed team in previous season's Serie A standings) for a €925,000 transfer fee.

Kolarov's first goal for Lazio came at the Stadio Oreste Granillo in Reggio Calabria on 30 September 2007, as he hit a rocket from 38 metres to secure a draw against lowly Reggina. During his first season in Rome, the 21-year-old Serb also participated in the UEFA Champions League for the first time, making his debut on 24 October 2007 away at Werder Bremen in a 2–1 victory.

In his second season in Italy, Kolarov established himself as Lazio's first choice at left back, scoring a spectacular goal against Lecce at the Stadio Via del Mare. It got even better for the Serbian in the second Derby della Capitale of the season, against city rivals Roma. With Lazio 3–2 up, Kolarov received the ball in defence from goalkeeper Fernando Muslera and proceeded to run the length of the pitch virtually unopposed. Having run 85 metres, Kolarov then slotted the ball past a helpless Doni in the Roma goal. On 13 May 2009, Kolarov played in the 2009 Coppa Italia final against Sampdoria. The match finished 1–1 after extra time, and Kolarov scored one of Lazio's penalties in the resultant penalty shoot-out, helping Lazio win the trophy and capping a great season for the Serbian.

Lazio and 2008–09 Serie A champions Inter Milan travelled to Beijing in August 2009 to play the 2009 Supercoppa Italiana. Kolarov picked up his second winner's medal, with Lazio defeating Inter 2–1. As the 2009–10 season drew to an end, Kolarov was instantly linked with a move away from Lazio, with Manchester City and Real Madrid supposedly interested.

=== Manchester City ===
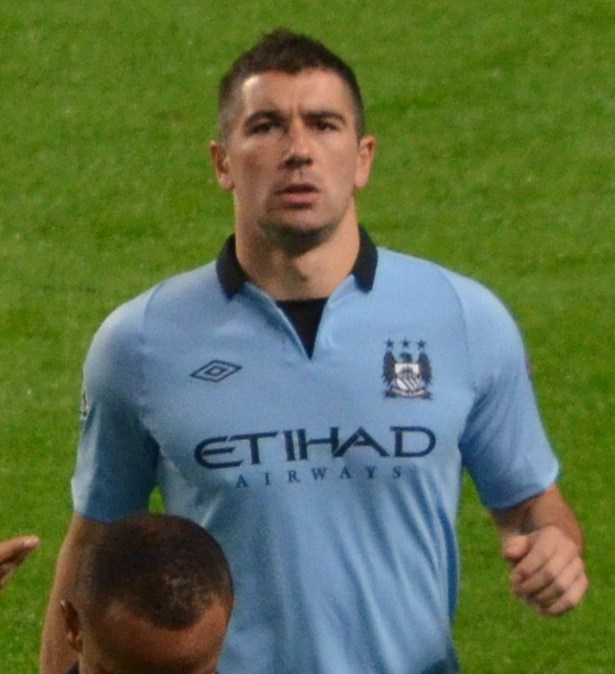
Kolarov with Manchester City in 2012

On 24 July 2010, it was announced that Kolarov had signed for Manchester City for a reported £16 million transfer fee. On 14 August, Kolarov made his Premier League debut in the 0–0 draw against Tottenham Hotspur at White Hart Lane. On 18 January 2011, Kolarov scored his first goal for the club in a 4–2 victory over Leicester City in the FA Cup, while on 2 February 2011, Kolarov recorded his first Premier League goal from a free kick in a 2–2 draw against Birmingham City. He played the full 90 minutes as City won the 2011 FA Cup final.

The summer 2011 arrival of Gaël Clichy to the club marginalized Kolarov's role in the squad and he saw his first team opportunities greatly reduced. On 14 September 2011, he scored an equaliser for City in the 1–1 draw against Napoli in their first 2011–12 Champions League group stage match. On 1 October 2011, he started and played the full 90 minutes in the left-back slot against Blackburn Rovers at Ewood Park in a 0–4 away victory in the Premier League. On 31 March 2012, he added another with a long-range swing which earned City a point against Sunderland at home, after coming back from 3–1 down. He ended that season with 12 league appearances, enough for a medal, as Manchester City won the 2011–12 Premier League title in dramatic circumstances on the last day of the season. On 18 September 2012, he scored a free kick in a 3–2 Champions League defeat at Real Madrid. He went on to score in the League Cup loss to Aston Villa, while in their match against Sunderland, he scored another free-kick just five minutes into the match.

Kolarov scored from the penalty spot in City's 3–2 comeback victory over Bayern Munich in the final match of their Champions League group stage on 10 December 2013, securing his side a spot in the knockout stages of the Champions League for the first time in club history. He scored his only league goal of the 2013–14 season on 1 January 2014, netting past goalkeeper Gerhard Tremmel as City defeated Swansea City by a score of 3–2. On 11 May, he won his second Premier League trophy with Manchester City after making 30 appearances in the league, and 44 in all competitions. In June 2014, Kolarov signed a new three-year deal with City, keeping him at the club until 2017.

=== Roma ===
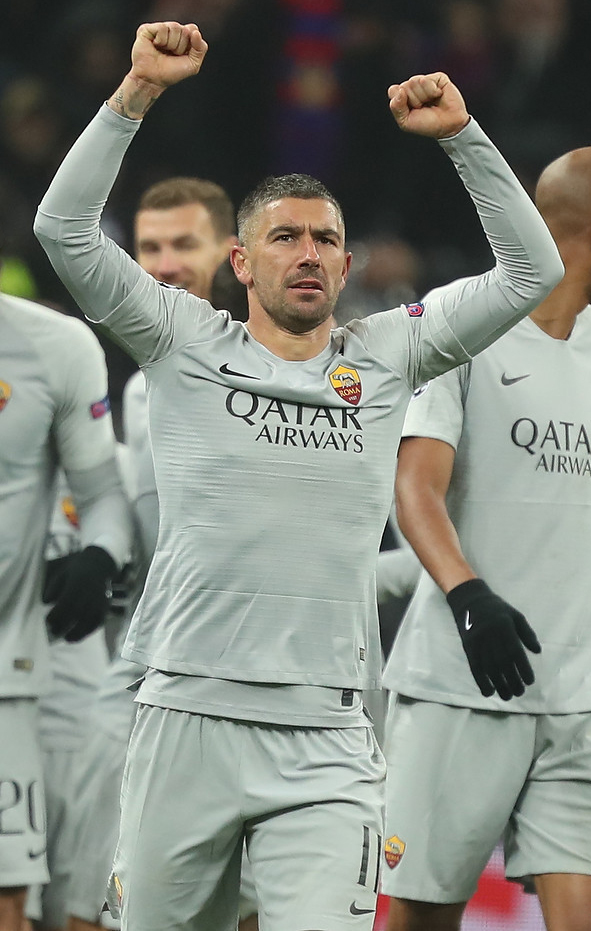
Kolarov with Roma in 2018

On 22 July 2017, Roma confirmed they had signed Kolarov on a three-year deal for a fee of €5 million.

Kolarov scored on his debut for the club on 20 August, scoring the winning goal in a 1–0 win over Atalanta. On 18 October, in the UEFA Champions League, he scored in a 3–3 draw with Chelsea. Four days later, he scored the winning goal in a 1–0 win over Torino.

On 26 September, Kolarov scored his first goal of the 2018–19 season in a 4–0 win over Frosinone. On 29 September, he scored against his former club and city rivals Lazio in a 3–1 win, becoming just the second player in history to have scored for both clubs in a Rome derby.

=== Inter Milan ===
On 8 September 2020, Kolarov joined Inter Milan on a reported one-year deal, with an option to extend for a further year, for a fee of €1.5 million.

On 19 June 2022, Kolarov announced his retirement from professional football.

== International career ==
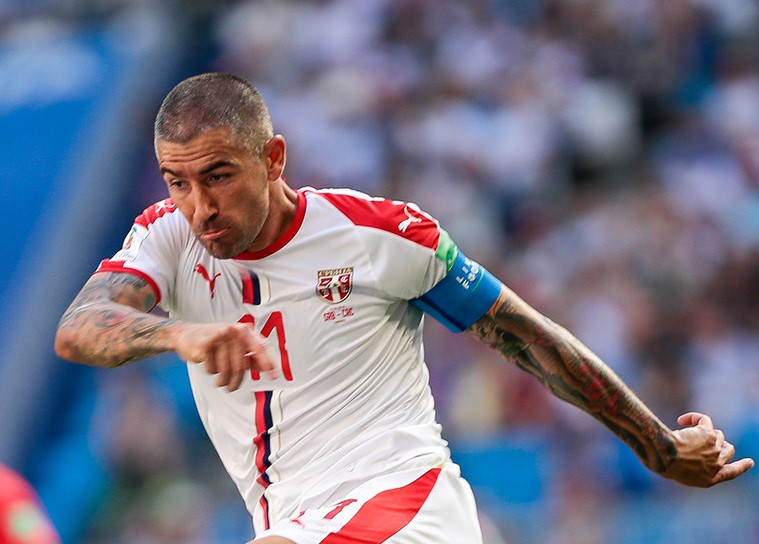
Kolarov captaining Serbia at the 2018 FIFA World Cup

Kolarov was a part of the successful Serbia under-21 side which reached the final of the 2007 UEFA European Under-21 Championship held in the Netherlands. As a key member of that side, Kolarov was named in the UEFA Team of the tournament. In the semi-final clash with Belgium, he scored a free-kick from long range.

In June 2010, he was selected in Serbia's squad for the 2010 FIFA World Cup, where he appeared in group stage matches against Ghana and Germany.

Kolarov played a major roles in UEFA Euro 2012 qualifiers and friendlies. Kolarov was eventually rewarded for an impressive 2011 with the Serbian Footballer of the Year award.

On 11 September 2012, Kolarov scored his first goal for Serbia during a 6–1 win against Wales in a 2014 World Cup qualifier. On 7 June 2013, he scored from a free kick against Belgium in a 2014 World Cup qualifier.

After a 2014 World Cup qualifier against Macedonia on 15 October 2013, an image of completely naked Kolarov, accompanied by Filip Đorđević and Nenad Tomović, leaked after a fan sneaked into the dressing room.

On 7 September 2014, he scored the equalizer in a 1–1 draw with France.

Having helped Serbia qualify for the 2018 FIFA World Cup, their first international tournament for eight years, he was also included in the final 23-man squad for that competition. Kolarov scored the only goal of their opening match against Costa Rica from a free kick. He captained Serbia in all three group stage matches.

== Style of play ==
Although primarily a left-back, Kolarov could also operate as a centre-back and anywhere along the left flank. Despite not being gifted with significant pace, he was known for his overlapping attacking runs on the wing, as well as his passing, crossing, and powerful ball-striking ability with his left foot, and his accuracy from free kicks.

== Career statistics ==
=== Club ===
Appearances and goals by club, season and competition
Club	Season	League			National Cup (Note: Includes Serbian Cup, Coppa Italia, FA Cup)		League Cup (Note: Includes Football League/EFL Cup)		Europe		Other		Total	
Club	Season	Division	Apps	Goals	Apps	Goals	Apps	Goals	Apps	Goals	Apps	Goals	Apps	Goals
Čukarički	2004–05	First League of Serbia and Montenegro	27	0	0	0	—		—		—		27	0
Čukarički	2005–06	Serbian First League	17	2	0	0	—		—		—		17	2
Čukarički	Total		44	2			—		—		—		44	2
OFK Beograd	2005–06	First League of Serbia and Montenegro	11	1	2	0	—		0	0	—		13	1
OFK Beograd	2006–07	Serbian SuperLiga	27	4	2	0	—		2 (Note: Appearances in UEFA Cup)	0	—		31	4
OFK Beograd	Total		38	5	4	0	—		2	0	—		44	5
Lazio	2007–08	Serie A	24	1	5	2	—		3 (Note: Appearance(s) in UEFA Champions League)	0	—		32	3
Lazio	2008–09	Serie A	25	2	6	1	—		—		—		31	3
Lazio	2009–10	Serie A	33	3	2	1	—		5 (Note: Appearances in UEFA Europa League)	1	1 (Note: Appearance in Supercoppa Italiana)	0	41	5
Lazio	Total		82	6	13	4	—		8	1	1	0	104	11
Manchester City	2010–11	Premier League	24	1	8	1	0	0	5	1	—		37	3
Manchester City	2011–12	Premier League	12	2	1	1	5	0	8 (Note: Five appearances and one goal in UEFA Champions League, three appearances in UEFA Europa League)	1	1 (Note: Appearance in FA Community Shield)	0	27	4
Manchester City	2012–13	Premier League	20	1	3	1	1	1	5	1	1	0	30	4
Manchester City	2013–14	Premier League	30	1	2	1	5	1	7	1	—		44	4
Manchester City	2014–15	Premier League	21	2	2	0	2	0	4	0	1	0	30	2
Manchester City	2015–16	Premier League	29	3	2	0	2	0	6	0	—		39	3
Manchester City	2016–17	Premier League	29	1	2	0	1	0	8	0	—		40	1
Manchester City	Total		165	11	20	4	16	2	43	4	3	0	247	21
Roma	2017–18	Serie A	35	2	0	0	—		12	1	—		47	3
Roma	2018–19	Serie A	33	8	2	1	—		8	0	—		43	9
Roma	2019–20	Serie A	32	7	2	0	—		8	0	—		42	7
Roma	Total		100	17	4	1	—		28	1	—		132	19
Inter Milan	2020–21	Serie A	7	0	3	0	—		1	0	—		11	0
Inter Milan	2021–22	Serie A	3	0	0	0	—		1	0	0	0	4	0
Inter Milan	Total		10	0	3	0	—		2	0	0	0	15	0
Career total			439	41	44	9	16	2	77	6	4	0	580	58

=== International ===
Appearances and goals by national team and year
National team	Year	Apps	Goals
Serbia	2008	2	0
Serbia	2009	7	0
Serbia	2010	8	0
Serbia	2011	10	0
Serbia	2012	11	1
Serbia	2013	7	3
Serbia	2014	7	2
Serbia	2015	7	1
Serbia	2016	7	1
Serbia	2017	6	2
Serbia	2018	10	1
Serbia	2019	8	0
Serbia	2020	4	0
Total		94	11

Score and results list Serbia's goal tally first

List of international goals scored by Aleksandar Kolarov
No.	Date	Venue	Cap	Opponent	Score	Result	Competition
1	11 September 2012	Karađorđe Stadium, Novi Sad, Serbia	35	Wales	1–0	6–1	2014 FIFA World Cup qualification
2	7 June 2013	King Baudouin Stadium, Brussels, Belgium	41	Belgium	1–2	1–2	2014 FIFA World Cup qualification
3	10 September 2013	Cardiff City Stadium, Cardiff, Wales	43	Wales	2–0	3–0	2014 FIFA World Cup qualification
4	15 October 2013	Jagodina City Stadium, Jagodina, Serbia	44	Macedonia	3–0	5–1	2014 FIFA World Cup qualification
5	26 May 2014	Red Bull Arena, Harrison, United States	47	Jamaica	2–0	2–1	Friendly
6	7 September 2014	Partizan Stadium, Belgrade, Serbia	50	France	1–1	1–1	Friendly
7	8 October 2015	Elbasan Arena, Elbasan, Albania	57	Albania	1–0	2–0	UEFA Euro 2016 qualifying
8	29 March 2016	A. Le Coq Arena, Tallinn, Estonia	61	Estonia	1–0	1–0	Friendly
9	2 September 2017	Partizan Stadium, Belgrade, Serbia	69	Moldova	2–0	3–0	2018 FIFA World Cup qualification
10	5 September 2017	Aviva Stadium, Dublin, Ireland	70	Republic of Ireland	1–0	1–0	2018 FIFA World Cup qualification
11	17 June 2018	Samara Arena, Samara, Russia	77	Costa Rica	1–0	1–0	2018 FIFA World Cup

== Post-playing career ==
On 3 June 2023, Kolarov was announced as the new sporting director of Italian Serie B club Pisa. His stint at Pisa however proved to be short-lived, as he left the club just a month later, on 10 July.

Kolarov is also doing business and he is the owner and investor of Bor Retail Park in Bor, Serbia

== Personal life ==
Kolarov grew up in Vojka a village in the province of Vojvodina in Serbia.

Kolarov has three children. He has an older brother, Nikola, who is a Serbian former professional footballer.

== Honours ==
=== Player ===
Lazio

- Coppa Italia: 2008–09
- Supercoppa Italiana: 2009

Manchester City

- Premier League: 2011–12, 2013–14
- FA Cup: 2010–11; runner-up: 2012–13
- Football League Cup: 2013–14, 2015–16
- FA Community Shield: 2012

Inter Milan

- Serie A: 2020–21
- Coppa Italia: 2021–22
- Supercoppa Italiana: 2021

Serbia U21

- UEFA European Under-21 Championship runner-up: 2007

Individual

- Serbian Player of the Year: 2011
- Serie A Team of the Year: 2018–19
- A.S. Roma Team of the Decade: 2010–2020

=== Assistant coach ===
Inter Milan

- Serie A: 2025–26
- Coppa Italia: 2025–26
