= 2025–26 Leicester City F.C. season =

Season of an English football club

Leicester City
2025–26 season
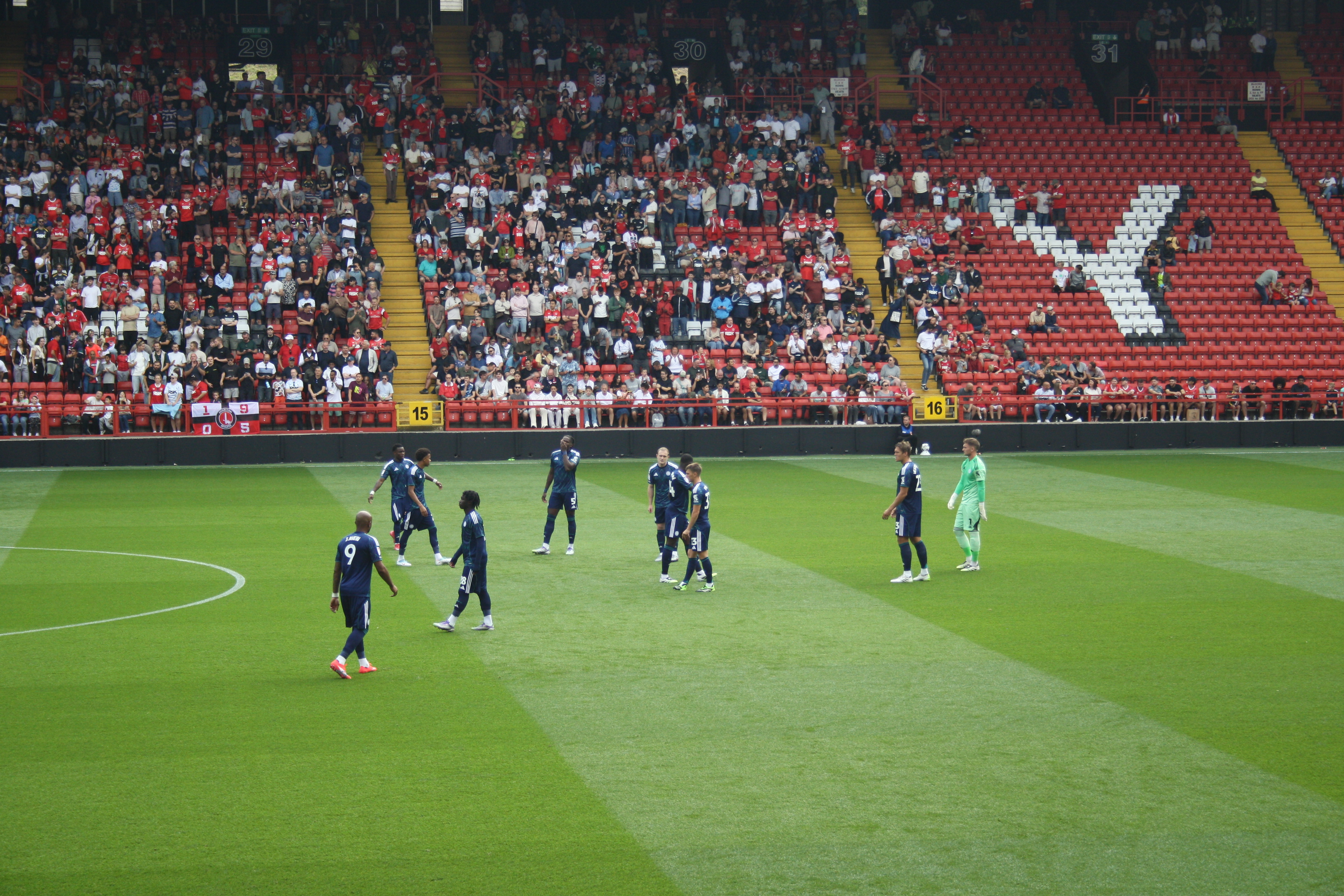
- Leicester City players getting into positions prior to their match against Charlton Athletic on 23 August 2025.
- Owner: King Power
- Chairman: Aiyawatt Srivaddhanaprabha
- Manager: Martí Cifuentes (until 25 January); Andy King (interim, from 25 January to 17 February); Gary Rowett (from 18 February)
- Stadium: King Power Stadium
- Championship: 23rd (relegated)
- FA Cup: Fourth round
- EFL Cup: First round
- Top goalscorer: League: Jordan James (11); All: Jordan James (11)
- Highest home attendance: 31,354 (v. Derby County, 29 December 2025)
- Lowest home attendance: 25,476 (v. Bristol City, 10 March 2026)
- Average home league attendance: 28,415
- Biggest win: 2–0 v. Birmingham City (H) (29 August 2025, EFL Championship); 3–1 v. Swansea City (A) (4 October 2025, EFL Championship); 3–1 v. Derby County (A) (6 December 2025, EFL Championship); 3–1 v. Ipswich Town (H) (13 December 2025, EFL Championship); 2–0 v. Cheltenham Town (A) (10 January 2026, FA Cup)
- Biggest defeat: 0–3 v. Southampton (A) (25 November 2025, EFL Championship); 1–4 v. QPR (A) (20 December 2025, EFL Championship)
Home colours	Away colours	Third colours

The 2025–26 season was the 121st season in the existence of Leicester City, and their 64th (non-consecutive) season in the second tier of English football. This season marked the club's return to the Championship following relegation from the Premier League in the previous season. In addition to the domestic league, they also competed in the FA Cup and the EFL Cup. This season covers the latter period from 1 July 2025 to 30 June 2026.

This was the first season since 2011–12 not to feature the club's third-highest goalscorer Jamie Vardy. He left the club after his contract expired, having scored 200 goals in 500 games for the Foxes during his 13 seasons at the club. Vardy's departure also meant Leicester City no longer had a player from the 2015–16 title-winning squad at the club.

On 21 April, a 2–2 draw with Hull City meant that Leicester could not accumulate enough points to finish ahead of any other team excluding Sheffield Wednesday and Oxford United. This led to Leicester being relegated to League One for the second time in their history, occurring only a decade after the club's remarkable Premier League triumph.

== Review ==
=== Background ===
The 2024–25 campaign was a disastrous season for Leicester City, as they had been relegated from the Premier League, following a 0–1 home loss to Liverpool on 20 April 2025.

They scored only 33 league goals all season, and conceded 80 goals, which is the highest number of goals they have conceded in a Premier League season in their history. They finished with a goal difference of −47, the worst in their history. Leicester failed to keep an away clean sheet, which was the worst away clean sheet record that season. They only kept three clean sheets at home in the Premier League, and went on a torrid spell of nine home games in a row without scoring, losing all of them. This run ended on 3 May 2025 with a 2–0 home win over Southampton. They also became the third team after Norwich City in 2020 and West Bromwich Albion in 2021 to suffer relegation at least five times.

Leicester won six Premier League games in the 2024–25 season, drew seven, and lost 25. This was statistically their worst 38 game Premier League season on record, with 2001–02 being better with 28 points amassed, compared to only 25 in 2024–25.

=== Pre-season ===
Prior to the season starting, Ruud van Nistelrooy mutually agreed with the club to step down as manager on 27 June 2025. His replacement, Martí Cifuentes, was announced as manager on 15 July 2025, signing a three-year contract with the club.

Leicester played their first pre-season friendly against Peterborough United on 5 July 2025 on their training ground, which was won 3–1 by The Foxes after Louis Page scored in the 63rd minute, before Chris Conn-Clarke equalised for the visitors in the 74th minute, after which Page grabbed his brace in the 78th minute and Silko Thomas made it 3–1 to The Foxes, marking their first pre-season win.

On 12 July 2025, Leicester hosted another friendly at their training ground, this time against their sister club Oud-Heverlee Leuven, also owned by King Power. The game was played in four halves of 45 minutes, and Leicester won the game 2–1, after OHL defender Takahiro Akimoto scored an own goal to give Leicester the lead, before Jovan Mijatović equalised for the visitors. Then, Jordan Ayew scored a 119th-minute winner to win the game 2–1.

Then, The Foxes travelled to Austria for their pre-season tour and had three games scheduled against Zalaegerszeg, Karpaty Lviv and Köln.

The first of these games was played on 19 July 2025 against Zalaegerszeg, which Leicester won 1–0 thanks to a Jordan Ayew goal in the 70th minute. On 25 July, the squad was split into half to play two games on the same day, against Karpaty Lviv and Köln. The Foxes won against Karpaty Lviv 1–2 thanks to a Patson Daka brace after falling behind due to a Yaroslav Karabin goal in the 48th minute. Then, Leicester took on Köln in their final game of their pre-season tour, which they lost 1–3, courtesy to goals from Sebastian Sebulonsen, Luca Waldschmidt and Florian Kainz. Kasey McAteer scored the only Leicester goal in the 43rd minute.

Leicester then finished off their pre-season with a home game against Fiorentina on 3 August 2025. Leicester won the game 2–0 thanks to first half goals from Jordan Ayew and Abdul Fatawu.

On 9 August 2025, the squad numbers for the First Team were announced ahead of Leicester's opening Championship clash against Sheffield Wednesday.

==== First team transfers (summer transfer window) ====
The EFL Championship transfer window opened on 16 June 2025 and closed on 1 September 2025 at 19:00 BST.

On 27 May 2025, Leicester announced that 12 players were to be released, three of which were first team players, one of which was former club captain Jamie Vardy. This is the first season since 2011–12 to not feature him. He had made exactly 500 appearances and had scored 200 goals at the time of his departure. Vardy's departure also meant Leicester City no longer had a player from the 2015–16 title-winning squad at the club.

On 29 July 2025, the club announced the free transfer of ex-Everton and QPR goalkeeper Asmir Begović on a one-year contract.

On 1 August 2025, the club announced that defender Conor Coady had joined Championship rivals Wrexham on a permanent two-year contract, with the option to extend for another year, for an undisclosed fee, reported to be around £2,000,000.

A week later, on 8 August 2025, the club announced that midfielder Wilfred Ndidi had joined Süper Lig side Beşiktaş on a permanent three-year contract, for a fee of £8,000,000.

A day later, on 9 August 2025, the club announced that goalkeeper Mads Hermansen had joined Premier League side West Ham United on a permanent five-year contract, with the option to extend for another year, for a fee of £20,000,000.

On 22 August 2025, the club announced that winger Kasey McAteer had joined Championship rivals Ipswich Town on a permanent four-year contract, for an undisclosed fee reported to be £12,000,000.

Three days later, on 25 August 2025, the club announced that defender James Justin had joined Premier League side Leeds United on a permanent four-year contract, for an initial fee of £8,000,000, with Leeds United paying £2,000,000 in add-ons.

On 1 September 2025 (deadline day), the club announced that midfielder Will Alves had joined EFL League One side Huddersfield Town on a one-year loan deal, for an undisclosed fee. Later the same day, the club announced the loan departures and loan signings of Bilal El Khannouss to VfB Stuttgart, Woyo Coulibaly to Sassuolo, and Julián Carranza, Jordan James and Aaron Ramsey to Leicester City respectively. All loan deals (departures and arrivals) are season long loans. All loan fees are undisclosed.

On 6 September 2025, the club announced that ex-Real Betis goalkeeper Fran Vieites had joined on a free transfer, signing a two-year contract.

=== August ===
Cifuentes' side kicked off their Championship campaign with a 2–1 home win over Sheffield Wednesday on 10 August 2025. Wednesday scored first, through a first half goal from Nathaniel Chalobah. However, Jannik Vestergaard and Wout Faes both scored crucial goals in the second half to earn Leicester a 2–1 win.

On 13 August, Leicester kicked off their EFL Cup campaign with an away game against EFL League One side Huddersfield Town as their first-round tie. Leicester drew the game 2–2 in normal regulation time, however lost 3–2 on penalties to Huddersfield, after Jordan Ayew, Bilal El Khannouss and Kasey McAteer missed their penalties.

Then, on 16 August, Leicester played their second away game of the season against Preston North End, where they had won 3–0 on 29 April 2024 to clinch the 2023–24 EFL Championship title. They lost the game 2–1, after Tottenham Hotspur loanee Alfie Devine scored in the 7th minute to make it 1–0 to the hosts. Then, in the second half, Jeremy Monga scored an equaliser and become the Championship's youngest goalscorer at 16 years and 37 days of age. However, the hosts found a late winner through Milutin Osmajić and won the game 2–1.

The following Saturday, on 23 August 2025, Leicester played their third consecutive and third away game of the season against Charlton Athletic. They won the game 1–0 courtesy of a 2nd half Abdul Fatawu goal in the 48th minute.

On 29 August 2025, Leicester returned to the King Power Stadium and welcomed Birmingham City for another Championship clash. Leicester won the game 2–0, thanks to an early first half Abdul Fatawu goal in the 8th minute, after which in the second half, substitute Ricardo Pereira scored the 2nd goal in the 88th minute, which was provided by Jeremy Monga, to win the game 2–0.

Leicester had played five games in August, winning three (against Sheffield Wednesday, Charlton Athletic and Birmingham City), drawing one (against Huddersfield Town in the EFL Cup but was subsequently knocked out in a penalty shootout), and losing one (against Preston North End).

By the end of August, Leicester had played four Championship games, won three, lost one, had nine points, and were 4th in the Championship table, one point off 2nd place, occupied by West Bromwich Albion at the time.

=== September ===
Following the end of the first international break of the season, Leicester began September travelling away to Oxford United on 13 September 2025 for their first Championship game of September.

Oxford took the lead early on through Tottenham Hotspur loanee Will Lankshear in the 9th minute to make it 1–0 to the hosts. Jordan Ayew then proceeded to score just four minutes later in the 13th minute, to level the score at 1–1, and also grabbed his first Championship goal of the season. Then, Burnley loanee Aaron Ramsey got sent off just 24 minutes into his debut, and Leicester were down to 10 men. Oxford capitalised on this and led 2–1 at half-time through a Boubakary Soumaré own goal in the 44th minute. Then, in the second half, substitute Ricardo Pereira scored to level it at 2–2, which was the final score.

Leicester then returned to the King Power for another Championship clash, for an M69 derby against Coventry City on 20 September 2025. Leicester were held to a 0–0 draw by Coventry, with Brighton & Hove Albion loanee Carl Rushworth denying Leicester several times, resulting in both teams settling for a point.

Leicester then travelled away to The Hawthorns for a Friday Night Championship clash against West Bromwich Albion on 26 September 2025. Leicester went down early in the first half as Aston Villa loanee Samuel Iling-Junior scored on his debut to make it 1–0 to West Brom. Then, after an uneventful game, Bobby De Cordova-Reid struck at goal in the 93rd minute, and scored a deflection off of Nat Phillips. The goal was credited as an own goal by the latter, and the game ended 1–1.

To end September, Leicester welcomed Wrexham to the King Power on Tuesday night for a Championship clash on 30 September 2025. Leicester took the lead in the first half, with Rennes loanee Jordan James scoring the goal to put Leicester 1–0 up by half time. However, in a flip of the scripts against West Brom, Wrexham equalised late in the 77th minute as Nathan Broadhead scored for Wrexham to level the game at 1–1 at full time.

Leicester had played four games in September, drawing all four against Oxford United, Coventry City, West Bromwich Albion and Wrexham.

By the end of September, Leicester had played eight Championship games, won three, drawn four and lost one, had 13 points and were 6th in the Championship table, five points behind then-league leaders Middlesbrough.

=== October ===
Leicester began October by travelling away to Swansea City on 4 October 2025 for their first Championship clash of the month.

Leicester took the lead early on through loanee Jordan James scoring the goal to put Leicester 1–0 up in the 13th minute, and at half-time. Then, in the 70th minute, Wout Faes made a rough challenge on Swansea substitute Ethan Galbraith and conceded a penalty, which was converted from the spot by Adam Idah to level it at 1–1. This was, however, cancelled out by Abdul Fatawu scoring a left-footed curler from outside the box to put Leicester 2–1 up in the 77th minute. Then, Jannik Vestergaard sealed the win with a goal in the 85th minute to put Leicester 3–1 up, and subsequently marked Leicester's first Championship win since 29 August 2025.

Leicester returned to the King Power for a Championship clash against Portsmouth on 18 October 2025, following the completion of the October international break. Leicester took the lead in the first half, when Burnley loanee Aaron Ramsey scored in the 26th minute to put Leicester 1–0 up at half-time. Similarly to the game against Wrexham, in the second half, Portsmouth equalised through a John Swift equaliser in the 58th minute.

Leicester then travelled away to Hull City on 21 October 2025 for a midweek Championship clash. Hull City opened the scoring through Liam Millar in the 6th minute, before the lead was doubled in the 31st minute by Leeds United loanee Joe Gelhardt to send Leicester 2–0 down at half-time. In the second half, Aaron Ramsey scored a top corner shot in the 67th minute to half the deficit and make the scoreline 2–1, which was the full time score, and Leicester were consigned to a second defeat of the Championship season.

Leicester then travelled away yet again, this time to Millwall, on 25 October 2025, for their final Championship match of the month. Leicester lost the game by a narrow 1–0 scoreline, with Femi Azeez scoring for Millwall.

Leicester had played four games in October, winning one against Swansea, drawing one against Portsmouth, and losing two against Hull City and Millwall.

By the end of October, Leicester had played 12 Championship games, won four, drawn five and lost three, had 17 points and were 10th in the Championship table, two points off then-6th placed Charlton Athletic.

=== November ===
Leicester began November by returning home to the King Power to host Blackburn Rovers on 1 November 2025 for their first Championship clash of the month. Leicester lost the game 0–2 with a brace from Andri Guðjohnsen, with goals in either half to succumb Leicester to their 3rd straight loss in a row in the league.

Leicester then remained at home for a midweek Championship clash on 4 November 2025, against Middlesbrough. Leicester took the lead in the first half when Jordan Ayew scored a penalty in first half stoppage time, following a handball from Hayden Hackney on the edge of the box just a few minutes prior, to put Leicester 1–0 up at half-time. Then, Leicester capitulated horribly in the second half, just like against Wrexham and Portsmouth. Middlesbrough were down to 10 men after defender Alfie Jones was shown a straight red for a cynical challenge on Stephy Mavididi, and then, Luke Ayling sent in a header in 90+6' to rescue a point for Middlesbrough, and frustratingly, Leicester had to settle for a point. This result meant that Leicester had now been on a winless run of 5 games, and only 1 win in 10 games.

Leicester then travelled away to Carrow Road for a Championship clash on 8 November 2025, against Norwich City, who had not won their previous 7 home Championship games at that point. Both teams entered this game with a poor run of form – this was seen as a must win game for both sides. The 1st half was relatively quiet, as the score was 0–0 at half-time. Then, Leicester went 1–0 down in the 62nd minute following a Mathias Kvistgaarden strike that went into the bottom right hand corner. However, Leicester did well to respond as Bobby De Cordova-Reid leveled the game at 1–1 in the 75th minute. Leicester then subsequently sealed the 3 points after Abdul Fatawu crossed it in from the right hand side to Rennes loanee Jordan James, who headed from the box to put Leicester 1–2 up at full-time. This win marked Leicester's first win in November and in over a month, last coming against Swansea City on 4 October 2025, and also saw their winless run come to an end. This was their first away win since Swansea City away on 4 October 2025. Norwich sacked manager Liam Manning following their loss, and Martí Cifuentes kept his job, as reports emerged that he would be sacked if Leicester lost to Norwich.

Leicester then returned to the King Power for a Championship clash against Stoke City on 22 November 2025, following the completion of the November international break (which was the last of 2025). Leicester took the lead in the 23rd minute when Stephy Mavididi scored to put Leicester 1–0 up. Then, shortly before half-time, Patson Daka netted his first league goal since 3 December 2024 (in a 3–1 Premier League win over West Ham United) to put Leicester 2–0 in the 44th minute and at half-time. Leicester started the 2nd half shaky, as Stoke halved the deficit through a Bae Jun-ho goal, however held on to the lead until full-time to register their first set of back-to-back wins since August (vs. Charlton Athletic and Birmingham City) and their first home win since 29 August 2025 (vs. Birmingham City). Leicester won the game 2–1 and sealed another 3 points.

Leicester then travelled away to St Mary's for a midweek Championship clash on 25 November, against Southampton. Leicester went 1–0 down in the 18th minute after Taylor Harwood-Bellis scored for Southampton. Then, Southampton doubled their lead with a Finn Azaz goal in the 23rd minute to make it 2–0 to the hosts. To compound Leicester's woes, youngster Olabade Aluko was sent off in the 33rd minute and Leicester were down to 10 men. Then, Southampton made it 3–0 after Taylor Harwood-Bellis netted a brace, and the score was 3–0 at half-time to Southampton, which was the full-time score, following a quiet second half.

Leicester then returned to the King Power and welcomed Sheffield United for a Championship clash on 29 November 2025. Leicester went 1–0 down early as Tom Cannon scored in the 2nd minute against his former team. Then, Sheffield United quickly doubled their lead through a Jaïro Riedewald goal. Then, Leicester went 3–0 down in the 32nd minute as Sydie Peck scored another for Sheffield United, and this was the score at half-time. Boos rang around the King Power Stadium, and manager Cifuentes was met with "you're getting sacked in the morning chants" by both sets of fans. Despite this, Stephy Mavididi pulled one back for the Foxes and the score was 3–1 after 53 minutes. Then, late on in the second half, Rennes loanee Jordan James scored a stunner in the 83rd minute to bring back belief for the Foxes, and the score was 3–2 after 83 minutes. However, Sheffield United ran out 3–2 winners at full time.

Leicester had played six games in November, winning two against Norwich and Stoke, drawing once against Middlesbrough and losing three against Blackburn, Southampton and Sheffield United.

By the end of November, Leicester had played 18 Championship games, won six, drawn six and lost six, had 24 points and were 16th in the Championship table on 24 points, five points off then-6th placed Bristol City.

=== December ===
Leicester kicked off their busy December with an away trip to Pride Park, facing local rivals Derby County on 6 December 2025. Reports emerged that manager Marti Cifuentes would be sacked if a favourable result was not achieved here; the pressure was incredibly high to get a good result. Despite that, Leicester started off excellently by scoring in the 8th minute through Bobby De Cordova-Reid to give Leicester a 1–0 lead. Then, just seven minutes later, Oliver Skipp scored from a corner to make it 2–0 to Leicester in just 15 minutes. Then, Jordan Ayew nodded home what would be a third goal, but was ruled offside. However, Leicester did get a third just before half-time, through Rennes loanee Jordan James, who headed home from a pinpoint Luke Thomas cross, and Leicester were 3–0 up at half time. The second half was relatively quiet, with Derby grabbing a consolation in the 63rd minute through Sondre Langås. Leicester picked up a crucial three points and started off December excellently.

The third round draw for the FA Cup was complete on 8 December 2025, and Leicester were drawn away to EFL League Two side Cheltenham Town.

Leicester then travelled away to Bristol City for a midweek Championship clash at Ashton Gate on 10 December 2025. Leicester started excellently like against Derby, scoring first from a Jordan Ayew penalty (after Scott Twine fouled Stephy Mavididi in the box moments before) to give Leicester a 1–0 lead. Leicester were in full control before half time as Bobby De Cordova-Reid scored in back-to-back games to make it 2–0 at half-time. However, the Foxes' lead destabilised as Mark Sykes cut their lead in half a minute into the second half. After being utterly dominated by the hosts for the rest of the half, Bristol City found an equaliser through an Emil Riis Jakobsen header in the 83rd minute, and it was now 2–2. This was the full-time score.

Leicester then returned home to the King Power for a tough Championship clash against Ipswich Town on 13 December 2025. Leicester once again started the first half in excellent fashion, with Bobby De Cordova-Reid netting for his third game straight, this time in the 8th minute, to give Leicester a 1–0 lead. Then, just before half-time, Abdul Fatawu recovered the ball, nutmegged and drove past two Ipswich players, and lobbed Ipswich keeper Christian Walton (who was off his line) from his own half (65 metres out), and scored a goal of the season contender to put Leicester 2–0 up at half-time. Then, shortly after the second half commenced, Abdul Fatawu drove past Ipswich defender Leif Davis and sent in a cross, which was met by Jordan Ayew, who tapped home to make it 3–0 to the Foxes after 52 minutes. Ipswich got a goal back through a calamitous Jakub Stolarczyk pass to Oliver Skipp, which was intercepted and put in the back of the Leicester net by Jens Cajuste, in the Leicester box, and the scoreline was 3–1 to the Foxes after 72 minutes. This was just a consolation goal for Ipswich however, as Leicester maintained their brilliant start to the month with another three points and subsequently moved up to 8th in the Championship table.

Leicester then travelled away to QPR for their last away Championship game of 2025, and their last game before Christmas, at Loftus Road on 20 December 2025. Leicester went 1–0 down in the 2nd minute as Kōki Saitō scored for the hosts. Then, QPR made it a 2–0 lead through Richard Kone in the 29th minute. QPR tripled their lead in the 33rd minute through Karamoko Dembélé, and it was 3–0 to the hosts. Leicester ended an abysmal first half display by going 4–0 down through Amadou Mbengue in first half stoppage time, and the score was 4–0 to QPR at half time. The second half was relatively quiet until Leicester were awarded a penalty in the 81st minute, which was missed by Bobby De Cordova-Reid, but Silko Thomas grabbed a consolation off the rebound to make the score 4–1 to QPR, which was the full time score, and Leicester suffered their joint heaviest defeat of the season (the other being a 3–0 loss to Southampton away in November) and their first loss of December.

Leicester then returrned to the King Power for a Championship clash against Watford on 26 December 2025. Leicester started the game excellently as Jordan James scored to put Leicester 1–0 up. However, shortly before half-time, Watford found their equaliser through Othmane Maamma and the score was 1–1 at half time. Then, Watford took the lead in the 65th minute through a Mattie Pollock header, and the score was 1–2 to Watford. This was the full time score, and Leicester slumped to their second defeat in a row.

To end off 2025 and December, Leicester remained at the King Power for a midweek Championship clash against Derby County on 29 December 2025, whom they had faced at the start of December and beaten 1–3. Leicester started off strongly against Derby, with Bobby De Cordova-Reid opening the scoring for Leicester, just as he did at Pride Park, to put Leicester in an early 1–0 lead in the 6th minute. However, Derby found their leveler in the 9th minute through a Rhian Brewster goal, and the score was 1–1. Then, shortly before half-time, Jordan James scored to make it 2–1 to Leicester at half time. The second half finished goalless, and Leicester sealed December and 2025 with a win.

Leicester played six games in December, winning three against Derby (twice) and Ipswich, drawing one to Bristol City and losing two to QPR and Watford.

By the end of 2025 and December, Leicester had played 24 Championship games, winning nine, drawing seven and losing eight; they had 34 points and were 12th in the Championship table, four points off then-sixth placed Watford.

=== January ===
Leicester kicked off their busy January by travelling away to Bramall Lane, for a tough Championship clash against Sheffield United on 1 January 2026. Leicester went 1–0 down within 36 minutes as Japhet Tanganga scored for the hosts. Then, former Leicester player Tom Cannon scored for Sheffield United, putting them in a 2–0 lead within 52 minutes. Then, Sheffield United added a third through Callum O'Hare in the 88th minute and Leicester were 3–0 down. Leicester then grabbed a consolation in the second minute of second half stoppage time through Jordan James to make it 3–1 to Sheffield United, which was the full time score, and Leicester began 2026 with a defeat.

Leicester then returned to the King Power for their first home game of 2026 against West Bromwich Albion on 5 January 2026. Leicester opened the scoring through Jordan Ayew in the 18th minute to make it 1–0 to Leicester. However, West Brom found their equaliser through Karlan Grant in the 34th minute, and the score was 1–1 at half time. The second half was quiet until the 4th minute of stoppage time, where Abdul Fatawu scored a late goal to put Leicester into a 2–1 lead and help them win the game by the same scoreline. Leicester subsequently won their first game of 2026 and sealed the 3 points.

Leicester then travelled away to Whaddon Road for a 3rd round FA Cup clash against EFL League Two opposition Cheltenham Town on 10 January 2026. Leicester took the lead in the 23rd minute through a Patson Daka goal, putting Leicester into a 0–1 lead. Then, just before half-time, Stephy Mavididi doubled the lead for Leicester in the 45th minute with a goal and Leicester led 0–2 by half-time. The second half was quiet, and Leicester played out a 0–2 win against Cheltenham, successfully claiming their spot in the FA Cup's 4th round.

2 days after this victory, the fourth round draw for the FA Cup was complete on 12 January 2026, and Leicester were drawn away to fellow EFL Championship side Southampton.

Leicester remained on the road for a Championship clash against rivals Coventry City at the Coventry Building Society Arena on 17 January 2026. Leicester began the game excellently as Jordan James had put them in a 0–1 lead in the 10th minute and by half-time. However, Coventry City responded quickly after the 2nd half began as Ellis Simms scored the equaliser for the hosts and the score was 1–1. Then, Haji Wright scored a late goal in the 85th minute to put Coventry 2–1 up. This was the score at full-time, and Leicester were condemned to a derby day defeat.

Leicester then remained on the road for the third game running, playing Wrexham at Racecourse Ground for a midweek Championship clash on 20 January 2026. The first half was goalless, but in the 2nd half, Lewis O'Brien scored for the hosts in the 63rd minute to put them 1–0 up. However, Leicester got a 90th-minute equaliser after Jannik Vestergaard scored to make it 1–1, which was the full-time score, and Leicester walked away with a point.

Leicester returned to the King Power for their first home game since 5 January 2026, and were playing relegation-threatened Oxford United, who were in 23rd. Oxford stunned the King Power by taking the lead early on through Sam Long in the 4th minute to put the visitors 0–1 up at half-time. In the second half, Oxford doubled their lead in the 71st minute after Mark Harris scored to put them 0–2 up. Leicester grabbed one back through Abdul Fatawu to make it 1–2, however Oxford held out until the full time whistle and Leicester were condemned to a defeat.

The next day, on 25 January 2026, manager Martí Cifuentes was sacked, following the home defeat to Oxford United, and club legend Andy King was named as interim manager on a short term basis until a new manager was found.

Leicester remained at home for another Championship clash against Charlton Athletic on 31 January 2026, in what was King's first game as interim manager. Leicester started the game poorly, with Caleb Okoli recklessly getting sent off for a challenge on Miles Leaburn in the 15th minute, meaning Leicester were reduced to 10 men for the remainder of the game. Charlton used the man advantage to full extent, as Sonny Carey scored for Charlton in the 36th minute to put the visitors 0–1 up. Charlton doubled their lead after Lyndon Dykes scored in the 4th minute of first half stoppage time to put Charlton 0–2 up at half time. Leicester started the second half well, after Abdul Fatawu won a penalty for Leicester, however Jordan Ayew failed to convert, as his effort hit the post. Charlton held out for a 0–2 win at full time, and Leicester were consigned to 2 successive home losses, as well as King losing his first game as interim manager.

Leicester played seven games in January, winning two against West Bromwich Albion and Cheltenham Town, drawing one to Wrexham and losing four against Sheffield United, Coventry City, Oxford United and Charlton Athletic.

By the end of January, Leicester had played 30 Championship games, winning ten, drawing eight and losing twelve; they had 38 points, and were nine points away from then-sixth placed Wrexham and then-22nd Blackburn Rovers.

==== First team transfers (winter transfer window) ====
The EFL Championship winter transfer window opened on 1 January 2026 and closed on 2 February at 19:00 GMT.

On 2 January 2026, Leicester opted to cancel Julián Carranza's loan contract, which was originally meant to be a season-long loan, and the striker returned to parent club Feyenoord. However, just two days later, he signed for Mexican side Club Necaxa on a permanent deal.

On 4 January 2026, Sammy Braybrooke joined EFL League Two side Chesterfield on loan for the rest of the 2025–26 season, after his short term loan spell at Newport County had ended on 31 December 2025.

On 13 January 2026, Wout Faes joined Ligue 1 side Monaco on loan for the rest of the 2025–26 season.

On 29 January 2026, Boubakary Soumaré joined Qatar Stars League side Al Duhail on a permanent deal for an undisclosed fee.

On 2 February 2026 (deadline day), Leicester confirmed the loan signing of Joseph Aribo from fellow Championship side Southampton.

On 3 February 2026, one day after deadline day, Leicester confirmed the loan signings of Divine Mukasa and Dujuan Richards and the short term contract of Jamaal Lascelles, all until the end of the season.

=== February ===
On 5 February 2026, Leicester City received bad news, as they were deducted six points from the Championship due to breaching the Profit and Sustainability Rules in the three-year reporting period ending with Season 2023–24, which left them on 32 points, hovering above the relegation on goal difference at the time in 20th.

Leicester travelled away to St Andrew's on 7 February 2026 for a Championship clash against Birmingham City. Leicester went 1–0 down early, as Ibrahim Osman scored for Birmingham in the 3rd minute. Leicester responded through Abdul Fatawu, as he scored in the 21st minute to bring Leicester level at 1–1. However, Leicester got a red card in two successive games, with Bobby De Cordova-Reid getting sent off in the 32nd minute, and Leicester were drawing 1–1 at half-time, despite being reduced to ten men. Birmingham took advantage of the ten men they were playing, and Jay Stansfield scored for the hosts in the 67th minute to put them 2–1 up, and Birmingham ran out 2–1 winners, condemning Leicester to a third successive league defeat.

Leicester returned to the King Power for a tough midweek Championship clash against Southampton on 10 February 2026. Leicester began the game in excellent fashion, with Man City loanee Divine Mukasa scoring for Leicester in the 9th minute to put them 1–0 up. Patson Daka doubled the lead within 4 minutes, as he scored to put Leicester 2–0 up within 13 minutes. Abdul Fatawu then tripled the lead within 29 minutes to put Leicester 3–0 up at half-time, and Andy King was set for a first win as interim manager. However, Leicester capitulated horribly in the second half. Ross Stewart scored for Southampton in the 61st minute to reduce the visitors' deficit to two goals, and the score was 3–1. Southampton scored another through Jack Stephens in the 82nd minute and the game was very tight from here. Southampton levelled at 3–3 in the 87th minute through Ryan Manning, and then completed a sensational comeback after Shea Charles scored a 90+6' winner to put the visitors 3–4 up at full-time, marking a horrible Leicester collapse and Southampton walked away with three points; Leicester were condemned to three straight home defeats, as well as four successive league defeats. The result also saw them drop into the relegation zone following results elsewhere.

Leicester then travelled away to St Mary's Stadium for an FA Cup clash against Southampton, the team they had lost to at home four days prior, on 14 February 2026. Southampton took the lead in the first minute of first half stoppage time through Cyle Larin, who converted his penalty, which was conceded by Caleb Okoli. In the second half, Leicester responded quickly as Oliver Skipp scored a bicycle kick in the 52nd minute to level the scores at 1–1. This was the score at full time, and the game advanced to extra time. The first half in extra time was goalless. The 2nd half saw James Bree head in the winner in the 109th minute that saw Southampton advance to the fifth round of the FA Cup and knock Leicester out of the FA Cup. This defeat saw them consigned to their fifth defeat in a row in all competitions.

On 18 February 2026, Leicester appointed new manager Gary Rowett on a short term deal until the end of the season to keep their Championship status safe. Andy King's interim tenure saw him manage 4 games against Southampton (2 times), Birmingham and Charlton, and also saw him losing all 4 games.

=== April ===
On 22 April 2026, Leicester were relegated to League One after drawing 2–2 with Hull. The relegation however was not confirmed due to a PSR charge against West Brom relating to the 2024–26 financial period ongoing at the time of the game's conclusion. The charge had potential points penalties for West Brom. If Leicester finished in front of Oxford, a significant enough deduction could relegate West Brom in 22nd instead of Leicester. However they could have been relegated at either the conclusion of the case (at first pass or after appeal) or when finishing above Oxford became mathematically impossible. The EFL had committed to delivering a verdict shortly after the season's conclusion at the latest. West Brom denied the charges, believing interest payments on previous loans had not been factored correctly into the calculations. However, on 24 April 2026, the EFL confirmed their decision to deduct West Brom two points for PSR breaches, meaning Leicester would not receive a reprieve from relegation and thus confirming League One football for the following season.

== Management team ==
Management team until 25 January 2026.

Position	Name
First team manager	(Spain) Martí Cifuentes
Assistant manager	(Spain) Xavi Calm
First team coach	(Wales) Andy King
First team set-piece coach	(England) Andrew Hughes

Management team from 18 February 2026.

Position	Name
First team manager	(England) Gary Rowett
Assistant manager	(Scotland) Callum Davidson
First team coach	(Wales) Andy King
First team coach	(England) Adam Sadler
First team set-piece coach	(England) Andrew Hughes

== Kits ==
Home	Third
Goalkeeper 1	Goalkeeper 3

== Players ==
=== Squad information ===
Players and squad numbers last updated on 29 May 2026. Appearances include all competitions.
Note: Flags indicate national team as has been defined under FIFA eligibility rules. Players may hold more than one non-FIFA nationality.

Number	Player	Nationality	Position(s)	Date of birth (age)	Signed in	Contract ends	Signed from	Appearances	Goals
Goalkeepers
1	Jakub Stolarczyk	(Poland)	GK	19 December 2000 (age 25)	2019	2027	Youth Academy	58	0
13	Fran Vieites	(Spain)	GK	7 May 1999 (age 27)	2025	2027	(Spain) Real Betis	0	0
31	Asmir Begović	(Bosnia and Herzegovina)	GK	20 June 1987 (age 39)	2025	2026	(England) Everton	12	0
61	Stevie Bausor	(England)	GK	11 May 2005 (age 21)	2025	–	Youth Academy	0	0
Defenders
4	Ben Nelson	(England)	CB	18 March 2004 (age 22)	2021	2027	Youth Academy	36	2
5	Caleb Okoli	(Italy)	CB	13 July 2001 (age 25)	2024	2029	(Italy) Atalanta	54	2
15	Harry Souttar	(Australia)	CB	22 October 1998 (age 28)	2023	2028	(England) Stoke City	18	1
16	Victor Kristiansen	(Denmark)	LB	16 December 2002 (age 23)	2023	2028	(Denmark) Copenhagen	51	0
21	Ricardo Pereira (captain)	(Portugal)	RB	6 October 1993 (age 33)	2018	2026	(Portugal) Porto	220	15
23	Jannik Vestergaard	(Denmark)	CB	3 August 1992 (age 34)	2021	2027	(England) Southampton	118	5
24	Jamaal Lascelles	(England)	CB	11 November 1993 (age 33)	2026	2026	(England) Newcastle United	9	0
33	Luke Thomas	(England)	LB	10 June 2001 (age 25)	2020	2029	Youth Academy	149	3
56	Olabade Aluko	(England)	LB / RB	30 November 2006 (age 19)	2025	–	Youth Academy	11	0
62	Kevon Gray	(England)	CB	6 October 2006 (age 20)	2026	2029	Youth Academy	1	0
Midfielders
6	Jordan James	(Wales)	CM	2 July 2004 (age 22)	2025	2026	(France) Rennes (loan)	34	11
8	Harry Winks	(England)	CM / DM	2 February 1996 (age 30)	2023	2027	(England) Tottenham Hotspur	109	5
17	Hamza Choudhury	(Bangladesh)	DM / RB	1 October 1997 (age 29)	2015	2027	Youth Academy	163	3
18	Joe Aribo	(Nigeria)	CM	21 July 1996 (age 30)	2026	2026	(England) Southampton (loan)	6	0
22	Oliver Skipp	(England)	DM	16 September 2000 (age 26)	2024	2029	(England) Tottenham Hotspur	65	2
25	Louis Page	(England)	AM	10 July 2008 (age 18)	2025	–	Youth Academy	21	0
29	Divine Mukasa	(England)	AM	22 August 2007 (age 19)	2026	2026	(England) Manchester City (loan)	16	2
30	Aaron Ramsey	(England)	AM	21 January 2003 (age 23)	2025	2026	(England) Burnley (loan)	9	2
34	Michael Golding	(England)	CM	23 March 2006 (age 20)	2024	2028	(England) Chelsea	1	0
39	Silko Thomas	(England)	AM / LW	25 June 2004 (age 22)	2025	–	Youth Academy	18	1
Attackers
7	Abdul Fatawu	(Ghana)	RW / LW / AM	8 March 2004 (age 22)	2023	2029	(Portugal) Sporting CP	100	16
9	Jordan Ayew	(Ghana)	ST	11 September 1991 (age 35)	2024	2026	(England) Crystal Palace	80	12
10	Stephy Mavididi	(England)	LW	31 May 1998 (age 28)	2023	2028	(France) Montpellier	126	23
12	Dujuan Richards	(Jamaica)	ST	10 November 2005 (age 21)	2026	2026	(England) Chelsea (loan)	4	0
14	Bobby De Cordova-Reid	(Jamaica)	LW / RW	2 February 1993 (age 33)	2024	2027	(England) Fulham	63	7
20	Patson Daka	(Zambia)	ST	9 October 1998 (age 28)	2021	2026	(Austria) Red Bull Salzburg	165	29
27	Wanya Marçal	(Portugal)	LW / RW	19 October 2002 (age 24)	2022	2026	Youth Academy	10	1
28	Jeremy Monga	(England)	LW / RW	10 July 2009 (age 17)	2025	2026	Youth Academy	37	1
Out on loan
3	Wout Faes	(Belgium)	CB	3 April 1998 (age 28)	2022	2027	(France) Reims	135	6
26	Woyo Coulibaly	(Mali)	RB	26 May 1999 (age 27)	2025	2029	(Italy) Parma	5	0
36	Sammy Braybrooke	(England)	CM	12 March 2004 (age 22)	2022	2027	Youth Academy	1	0
37	Will Alves	(England)	AM	4 May 2005 (age 21)	2022	2028	Youth Academy	6	0
48	Chris Popov	(Wales)	ST	26 October 2004 (age 22)	2021	–	Youth Academy	1	0
65	Jake Evans	(England)	ST / RW	21 August 2008 (age 18)	2025	–	Youth Academy	4	0

== Transfers ==
=== In ===
Date	Position	Nationality	Player	From	Fee	Team	Ref.
29 July 2025	GK	(Bosnia and Herzegovina)	Asmir Begović	(England) Everton	Free	First team	
6 September 2025	GK	(Spain)	Fran Vieites	(Spain) Real Betis	Free	First team	
3 February 2026	CB	(England)	Jamaal Lascelles	(England) Newcastle United	Free	First team	

=== Out ===
Date	Position	Nationality	Player	To	Fee	Team	Ref.
30 June 2025	CM	(England)	Kaleb Dyke	(England) Queens Park Rangers	Released	Academy	
30 June 2025	CM	(Wales)	Oliver Ewing	(England) Scunthorpe United	Released	Academy	
30 June 2025	CB	(England)	Harvey Godsmark-Ford	(Wales) The New Saints	Released	Academy	
30 June 2025	CB	(England)	Ben Grist	(England) Boston United	Released	Academy	
30 June 2025	LW	(Bermuda)	Deniche Hill	(England) Buxton	Released	Academy	
30 June 2025	GK	(Denmark)	Daniel Iversen	(England) Preston North End	End of contract	First team	
30 June 2025	CB	(Republic of Ireland)	Liam McAlinney	(Belgium) OH Leuven	Released	Academy	
30 June 2025	CM	(England)	Arjan Raikhy	(England) Boston United	Released	Academy	
30 June 2025	CF	(England)	Jamie Vardy	(Italy) Cremonese	End of contract	First team	
30 June 2025	GK	(Wales)	Danny Ward	(Wales) Wrexham	End of contract	First team	
30 June 2025	RB	(England)	Joe Wormleighton	(England) Northampton Town	Released	Academy	
30 June 2025	GK	(England)	Brad Young	(England) Bristol Rovers	Released	Academy	
1 August 2025	CB	(England)	Conor Coady	(Wales) Wrexham	£2,000,000	First team	
8 August 2025	DM	(Nigeria)	Wilfred Ndidi	(Turkey) Beşiktaş	£8,000,000	First team	
9 August 2025	GK	(Denmark)	Mads Hermansen	(England) West Ham United	£20,000,000	First team	
22 August 2025	RW	(Republic of Ireland)	Kasey McAteer	(England) Ipswich Town	£12,000,000	First team	
25 August 2025	RB	(England)	James Justin	(England) Leeds United	£8,000,000	First team	
29 January 2026	DM	(France)	Boubakary Soumaré	(Qatar) Al Duhail	Undisclosed	First team	
2 February 2026	DM	(Jamaica)	Brandon Cover	(England) Rotherham United	Undisclosed	First team	

=== Loaned in ===
Date	Position	Nationality	Player	From	Date until	Team	Ref.
1 September 2025	CF	(Argentina)	Julián Carranza	(Netherlands) Feyenoord	2 January 2026 (Note: On 2 January, Carranza's season-long loan from Feyenoord was terminated)	First team	
1 September 2025	CM	(Wales)	Jordan James	(France) Rennes	End of Season	First team	
1 September 2025	CAM	(England)	Aaron Ramsey	(England) Burnley	End of Season	First team	
2 February 2026	CM	(Nigeria)	Joe Aribo	(England) Southampton	End of Season	First team	
3 February 2026	CAM	(England)	Divine Mukasa	(England) Manchester City	End of Season	First team	
3 February 2026	CF	(Jamaica)	Dujuan Richards	(England) Chelsea	End of Season	First team	

=== Loaned out ===
Date	Position	Nat.	Player	To	Date until	Team	Ref.
11 July 2025	CM	(England)	Henry Cartwright	(Scotland) Falkirk	End of Season	Under-21s	
26 July 2025	CB	(England)	Tom Wilson-Brown	(England) Swindon Town	End of Season	Under-21s	
19 August 2025	RB	(England)	Jayden Joseph	(England) Tranmere Rovers	End of Season (Note: On 1 January, Joseph's loan at Tranmere was extended until the end of season)	Under-21s	
1 September 2025	CAM	(England)	Will Alves	(England) Huddersfield Town	End of Season	First team	
1 September 2025	CM	(England)	Sammy Braybrooke	(Wales) Newport County	3 January 2026	First team	
1 September 2025	RB	(Mali)	Woyo Coulibaly	(Italy) Sassuolo	End of Season	First team	
1 September 2025	CAM	(Morocco)	Bilal El Khannouss	(Germany) VfB Stuttgart	End of Season	First team	
1 September 2025	CAM	(Ghana)	Nathan Opoku	(England) Newport County	End of Season (Note: On 1 January, Opoku's loan at Newport was extended until the end of season)	Under-21s	
4 October 2025	GK	(England)	Jake Donohue	(England) Quorn	1 November 2025	Under-21s	
10 October 2025	CF	(England)	Kian Pennant	(England) Gateshead	31 December 2025 (Note: On 24 November, Pennant's loan at Gateshead was extended until the end of the year)	Under-21s	
21 October 2025	GK	(England)	Harry French	(England) Boston United	18 November 2025	Under-21s	
30 December 2025	CM	(England)	Toby Onanaye	(England) Kidderminster Harriers	24 March 2026	Under-21s	
4 January 2026	CM	(England)	Sammy Braybrooke	(England) Chesterfield	End of Season	First team	
13 January 2026	CB	(Belgium)	Wout Faes	(France) Monaco	End of Season	First team	
21 January 2026	CF	(Wales)	Chris Popov	(England) Morecambe	End of Season	Under-21s	
27 January 2026	CF	(England)	Jake Evans	(England) Northampton Town	End of Season	Under-21s	

== Pre-season and friendlies ==
On 9 June, Leicester City confirmed a home friendly against Serie A side Fiorentina in what would be the final pre-season fixture. Four days later, two matches at the club's training facility were confirmed against Peterborough United and Oud-Heverlee Leuven. A pre-season training camp in Austria along with three more friendlies against Zalaegerszeg, Karpaty Lviv and 1. FC Köln.

Win Draw Loss Fixtures

5 July 2025 Friendly	Leicester City	3–1	Peterborough United	Seagrave
12:30 BST	Page 63', 78'; Thomas 89'	Report	Conn-Clarke 74'	Stadium: Seagrave Training Ground

12 July 2025 Friendly	Leicester City	2–1	Oud-Heverlee Leuven	Seagrave
15:00 BST	Akimoto 9' (o.g.); Ayew 119'	Report	Mijatović 52'	Stadium: Seagrave Training Ground
Note: Game was played in 4 quarters of 45 minutes.

19 July 2025 Friendly	Zalaegerszeg	0–1	Leicester City	Zalaegerszeg, Hungary
18:30 CEST		Report	Ayew 70'	Stadium: ZTE Arena

25 July 2025 Friendly	Karpaty Lviv	1–2	Leicester City	Friedberg, Austria
11:30 CEST	Karabin 48'	Report	Daka 50' (pen.), 73'	Stadium: Sportzentrum Friedberg

25 July 2025 Friendly	1. FC Köln	3–1	Leicester City	Liebenau, Austria
17:00 CEST	Sebulonsen 5'; Waldschmidt 17'; Kainz 87' (pen.)	Report	McAteer 43'	Stadium: Liebenauer Stadium

3 August 2025 Friendly	Leicester City	2–0	Fiorentina	Leicester
15:00 BST	Ayew 29'; Fatawu 36'	Report	Parisi (yellow card) 22'	Stadium: King Power Stadium

== Competitions ==
=== Overall record ===
Competition	First match	Last match	Starting round	Final position	Record							
Competition	First match	Last match	Starting round	Final position	Pld	W	D	L	GF	GA	GD	Win %
Championship	10 August 2025	2 May 2026	Matchday 1	23rd	46	12	16	18	58	68	−10	26.09
FA Cup	10 January 2026	14 February 2026	Third round	Fourth round	2	1	0	1	3	2	+1	50.00
EFL Cup	13 August 2025		First round	First round	1	0	1	0	2	2	+0	0.00
Total					49	13	17	19	63	72	−9	26.53

Source: Soccerway

=== Championship ===
==== League table ====
Pos	Team	Pld	W	D	L	GF	GA	GD	Pts	Promotion, qualification or relegation
20	Blackburn Rovers	46	13	13	20	42	56	−14	52	
21	West Bromwich Albion	46	13	14	19	48	58	−10	51 (Note: West Bromwich Albion were deducted two points on 24 April 2026 for breaching PSR rules.)	
22	Oxford United (R)	46	11	14	21	45	59	−14	47	Relegation to EFL League One
23	Leicester City (R)	46	12	16	18	58	68	−10	46 (Note: Leicester City were deducted six points on 5 February 2026 for breaching PSR rules.)	Relegation to EFL League One
24	Sheffield Wednesday (R)	46	2	12	32	29	89	−60	0 (Note: Sheffield Wednesday were deducted twelve points due to filing for administration on 24 October 2025, then deducted a further six points on 1 December 2025 for failing to fulfil payment obligations.)	Relegation to EFL League One

Source: EFL Official Website
Rules for classification: 1) Points; 2) Goal difference; 3) Number of goals scored; 4) Head-to-head results; 5) Wins; 6) Away goals; 7) Penalty points (sec 9.5); 8) Number of 12-point sending off offences; 9) Play-off (only if needed to determine promotion/relegation)
(R) Relegated

==== Results summary ====
Overall								Home						Away					
Pld	W	D	L	GF	GA	GD	Pts	W	D	L	GF	GA	GD	W	D	L	GF	GA	GD
46	12	16	18	58	68	−10	46	7	7	9	31	34	−3	5	9	9	27	34	−7

Source: Soccerway

==== Results by round ====
Round	1	2	3	4	5	6	7	8	9	10	11	12	13	14	15	16	17	18	19	20	21	22	23	24	25	26	27	28	29	30	31	32	33	34	35	36	37	38	39	40	41	42	43	44	45	46
Ground	H	A	A	H	A	H	A	H	A	H	A	A	H	H	A	H	A	H	A	A	H	A	H	H	A	H	A	A	H	H	A	H	A	A	H	A	H	H	A	H	A	H	A	H	H	A
Result	W	L	W	W	D	D	D	D	W	D	L	L	L	D	W	W	L	L	W	D	W	L	L	W	L	W	L	D	L	L	L	L	D	D	L	D	W	L	D	D	D	L	L	D	D	W
Position	4	12	7	4	4	4	5	6	3	4	9	10	14	13	12	10	15	16	14	13	8	13	14	12	13	12	13	14	14	20	21	22	22	22	22	22	21	23	22	22	22	23	23	23	23	23
Points	3	3	6	9	10	11	12	13	16	17	17	17	17	18	21	24	24	24	27	28	31	31	31	34	34	37	37	38	38	32 (Note: Leicester City were deducted six points on 5 February 2026.)	32	32	33	34	34	35	38	38	39	40	41	41	41	42	43	46

Source: Soccerway
A = Away; H = Home; W = Win; D = Draw; L = Loss; P = Postponed

==== Score overview ====
Key: Leicester goals shown first. (i.e. if score reads 1–0, Leicester scored 1, no matter away or home games.)

Opposition	Home score	Away score	Aggregate score	Double
Birmingham City	2–0	1–2	3–2	No
Blackburn Rovers	0–2	1–0	1–2	No
Bristol City	2–0	2–2	4–2	No
Charlton Athletic	0–2	1–0	1–2	No
Coventry City	0–0	1–2	1–2	No
Derby County	2–1	3–1	5–2	✓
Hull City	2–2	1–2	3–4	No
Ipswich Town	3–1	1–1	4–2	No
Middlesbrough	1–1	1–1	2–2	No
Millwall	1–1	0–1	1–2	No
Norwich City	0–2	2–1	2–3	No
Oxford United	1–2	2–2	3–4	No
Portsmouth	1–1	0–1	1–2	No
Preston North End	2–2	1–2	3–4	No
QPR	1–3	1–4	2–7	No
Sheffield United	2–3	1–3	3–6	No
Sheffield Wednesday	2–1	1–1	3–2	No
Southampton	3–4	0–3	3–7	No
Stoke City	2–1	2–2	4–3	No
Swansea City	0–1	3–1	3–2	No
Watford	1–2	0–0	1–2	No
West Bromwich Albion	2–1	1–1	3–2	No
Wrexham	1–1	1–1	2–2	No

==== Matches ====
Win Draw Loss Fixtures

The fixtures for the 2025/26 season were released on Thursday 26 June 2025 at 12pm BST, and Leicester were scheduled to play Sheffield Wednesday on the opening weekend.

10 August 2025 1	Leicester City	2–1	Sheffield Wednesday	Leicester
16:30 BST	Vestergaard 54'; Faes 87'	Report	Chalobah 26'; Bannan (yellow card) 71' (yellow-red card) 76'	Stadium: King Power Stadium; Attendance: 31,102; Referee: Matt Donohue

16 August 2025 2	Preston North End	2–1	Leicester City	Preston
15:00 BST	Devine 7'; Storey (yellow card) 74'; Osmajić 85', (yellow card) 85'	Report	Monga 67'	Stadium: Deepdale; Attendance: 16,797; Referee: Gavin Ward

23 August 2025 3	Charlton Athletic	0–1	Leicester City	Charlton
12:30 BST	Coventry (yellow card) 54'; Jones (yellow card) 68'	Report	Fatawu 48'; Ayew (yellow card) 55'	Stadium: The Valley; Attendance: 22,183; Referee: Dean Whitestone
Note: Fixture was initially scheduled for a 15:00 kick-off, but was moved for live Sky Sports broadcast.

29 August 2025 4	Leicester City	2–0	Birmingham City	Leicester
20:00 BST	Fatawu 8', (yellow card) 57'; Choudhury (yellow card) 45'; Pereira (yellow card) 76', (goal) 88'	Report	Furuhashi (yellow card) 62'; Klarer (yellow card) 64'; Gray (yellow card) 74'	Stadium: King Power Stadium; Attendance: 30,971; Referee: Joshua Smith
Note: Fixture was originally scheduled for 30 August, but was moved for live Sky Sports broadcasting.

13 September 2025 5	Oxford United	2–2	Leicester City	Oxford
12:30 BST	Lankshear 9'; Soumaré 44' (o.g.); Long (yellow card) 63'	Report	Soumaré (yellow card) 3'; Ayew 13'; Ramsey (red card) 24'; Vestergaard (yellow card) 50'; Pereira 55'	Stadium: Kassam Stadium; Attendance: 11,362; Referee: Ben Toner
Note: Fixture was originally scheduled for a 15:00 kick-off, but was moved for live Sky Sports broadcasting.

20 September 2025 6	Leicester City	0–0	Coventry City	Leicester
12:30 BST			Dasilva (yellow card) 55'; Bidwell (yellow card) 90+2'; Eccles (yellow card) 90+4'	Stadium: King Power Stadium; Attendance: 30,857; Referee: Oliver Langford
Note: Fixture was originally scheduled for a 15:00 kick-off, but was moved for live Sky Sports broadcasting.

26 September 2025 7	West Bromwich Albion	1–1	Leicester City	West Bromwich
20:00 BST	Iling-Junior 10'; Phillips (yellow card) 47'; Molumby (yellow card) 70'	Report	Carranza (yellow card) 61'; Monga (yellow card) 88'; Vestergaard (yellow card) 90'; Choudhury (yellow card) 90+1'; Phillips 90+3' (o.g.); Fatawu (yellow card) 90+5'	Stadium: The Hawthorns; Attendance: 24,235; Referee: Stephen Martin
Note: Fixture was originally scheduled for 27 September, but was moved for live Sky Sports broadcasting.

30 September 2025 8	Leicester City	1–1	Wrexham	Leicester
19:45 BST	Faes (yellow card) 25'; Thomas (yellow card) 34'; James 36'; Skipp (yellow card) 73'	Report	Longman (yellow card) 57'; Broadhead 77'	Stadium: King Power Stadium; Attendance: 29,357; Referee: Elliot Bell

4 October 2025 9	Swansea City	1–3	Leicester City	Swansea
15:00 BST	Idah 70' (pen.); Cabango (yellow card) 71'; Burgess (yellow card) 82'	Report	James 13'; L. Thomas (yellow card) 76'; Fatawu 77'; Vestergaard 85'	Stadium: Swansea.com Stadium; Attendance: 16,601; Referee: David Webb

18 October 2025 10	Leicester City	1–1	Portsmouth	Leicester
19:45 BST	Pereira (yellow card) 3'; Ramsey 26'	Report	Swift 58'; Yang Min-hyeok (yellow card) 71'; Dozzell (yellow card) 87'	Stadium: King Power Stadium; Attendance: 30,496; Referee: Farai Hallam
Note: Fixture was originally scheduled for a 15:00 kick-off, but was moved due to a clash with Leicester Tigers playing the same day.

21 October 2025 11	Hull City	2–1	Leicester City	Kingston upon Hull
15:00 BST	Millar 6'; Gelhardt 31'	Report	Ramsey 67'; Thomas (yellow card) 72'	Stadium: MKM Stadium; Attendance: 20,211; Referee: Matt Donohue

25 October 2025 12	Millwall	1–0	Leicester City	Bermondsey
15:00 BST	Azeez 44'; Cooper (yellow card) 28'	Report	Pereira (yellow card) 53'; Winks (yellow card) 83'	Stadium: The Den; Attendance: 18,738; Referee: James Bell

1 November 2025 13	Leicester City	0–2	Blackburn Rovers	Leicester
12:30 GMT		Report	Guðjohnsen 20', 63'; Henriksson (yellow card) 23'	Stadium: King Power Stadium; Attendance: 27,925; Referee: Tom Nield
Note: Fixture was originally scheduled for a 15:00 kick-off, but was rescheduled for live Sky Sports broadcasting.

4 November 2025 14	Leicester City	1–1	Middlesbrough	Leicester
19:45 GMT	Fatawu (yellow card) 23'; Ayew 45+4' (pen.), (yellow card) 59'; James (yellow card) 49'; Skipp (yellow card) 67'; L. Thomas (yellow card) 69'; Daka (yellow card) 90+3'	Report	Brittain (yellow card) 45+3'; Jones (red card) 90'; Ayling 90+6'	Stadium: King Power Stadium; Attendance: 28,389; Referee: Adam Herczeg

8 November 2025 15	Norwich City	1–2	Leicester City	Norwich
15:00 GMT	Kvistgaarden 62'; Darling (yellow card) 76'	Report	Pereira (yellow card) 9'; De Cordova-Reid 75'; James 90+2'	Stadium: Carrow Road; Attendance: 26,213; Referee: Dean Whitestone

22 November 2025 16	Leicester City	2–1	Stoke City	Leicester
15:00 GMT	Skipp (yellow card) 20'; Mavididi 23', (yellow card) 43'; Daka 44'; Winks (yellow card) 61'; Vestergaard (yellow card) 64'; L. Thomas (yellow card) 66'; Begović (yellow card) 90+5'	Report	Bae Jun-ho 48'; Cresswell (yellow card) 90+2'; Phillips (yellow card) 90+6'	Stadium: King Power Stadium; Attendance: 29,897; Referee: Matt Donohue

25 November 2025 17	Southampton	3–0	Leicester City	Southampton
20:00 GMT	Harwood-Bellis 18', 42'; Azaz 23'; Downes (yellow card) 68'	Report	Aluko (yellow card) 5' (yellow-red card) 33'	Stadium: St Mary's Stadium; Attendance: 25,921; Referee: Gavin Ward
Note: Fixture was originally scheduled for a 19:45 kick-off, but was rescheduled for live Sky Sports broadcasting.

29 November 2025 18	Leicester City	2–3	Sheffield United	Leicester
12:30 GMT	Mavididi 53'; Soumaré (yellow card) 68'; James 83', (yellow card) 89'	Report	Cannon 2'; Riedewald 4'; Peck 32'; McCallum (yellow card) 90+2'	Stadium: King Power Stadium; Attendance: 28,834; Referee: Anthony Backhouse
Note: Fixture was originally scheduled for a 15:00 kick-off, but was rescheduled for live Sky Sports broadcasting.

6 December 2025 19	Derby County	1–3	Leicester City	Derby
12:30 GMT	Adams (yellow card) 22'; Langås (yellow card) 24', (goal) 63'; Thompson (yellow card) 77'	Report	De Cordova-Reid 8', (yellow card) 64'; Skipp 15'; Vestergaard (yellow card) 19'; James 31'	Stadium: Pride Park; Attendance: 30,784; Referee: Josh Smith
Note: Fixture was originally scheduled for a 15:00 kick-off, but was rescheduled for live Sky Sports broadcasting.

10 December 2025 20	Bristol City	2–2	Leicester City	Bristol
19:45 GMT	Twine (yellow card) 24'; Sykes 46'; Pring (yellow card) 65'; Riis Jakobsen 83'	Report	Fatawu (yellow card) 9'; Ayew 17' (pen.); De Cordova-Reid 45'; Nelson (yellow card) 50'; Stolarczyk (yellow card) 65'	Stadium: Ashton Gate; Attendance: 21,397; Referee: James Linington

13 December 2025 21	Leicester City	3–1	Ipswich Town	Leicester
15:00 GMT	De Cordova-Reid 8'; Fatawu 43'; Ayew 52'; Thomas (yellow card) 90+4'	Report	Taylor (yellow card) 30'; Cajuste 71'; Clarke (yellow card) 90+2'	Stadium: King Power Stadium; Attendance: 28,948; Referee: Thomas Kirk

20 December 2025 22	Queens Park Rangers	4–1	Leicester City	Shepherd's Bush
20:00 GMT	Saitō 2'; Kone 29'; Dembélé 33'; Mbengue 45+3'; Norrington-Davies (yellow card) 90+4'	Report	Ayew (yellow card) 35'; Pereira (yellow card) 77'; S. Thomas 82'	Stadium: Loftus Road; Attendance: 17,500; Referee: Tom Nield

26 December 2025 23	Leicester City	1–2	Watford	Leicester
15:00 GMT	James 7'; Fatawu (yellow card) 19'; Skipp (yellow card) 42'; Mavididi (yellow card) 63'	Report	Maamma 45'; Louza (yellow card) 48'; Kyprianou (yellow card) 61'; Pollock 65'	Stadium: King Power Stadium; Attendance: 30,485; Referee: Josh Smith

29 December 2025 24	Leicester City	2–1	Derby County	Leicester
19:45 GMT	De Cordova-Reid 6'; James 41', (yellow card) 83'	Report	Brewster 9'; Thompson (yellow card) 90+6'; Jackson (yellow card) 90+6'	Stadium: King Power Stadium; Attendance: 31,354; Referee: Gavin Ward

1 January 2026 25	Sheffield United	3–1	Leicester City	Sheffield
17:30 GMT	Tanganga 36'; Cannon 52'; Seriki (yellow card) 84'; O'Hare 89'	Report	Fatawu (yellow card) 26'; Mavididi (yellow card) 65'; James 90+2'	Stadium: Bramall Lane; Attendance: 29,644; Referee: Farai Hallam
Note: Fixture was originally scheduled for a 15:00 kick-off, but was rescheduled for live Sky Sports broadcasting.

5 January 2026 26	Leicester City	2–1	West Bromwich Albion	Leicester
20:00 GMT	Ayew 18'; Choudhury (yellow card) 77'; Fatawu 90+4'	Report	Grant 34'	Stadium: King Power Stadium; Attendance: 27,130; Referee: Stephen Martin
Note: Fixture was originally scheduled for 4 January, but was rescheduled for live Sky Sports broadcasting.

17 January 2026 27	Coventry City	2–1	Leicester City	Coventry
12:30 GMT	Simms 47'; Wright 85'; Dasilva (yellow card) 90+7'	Report	James 10', (yellow card) 90+3'; Monga (yellow card) 85'; Okoli (yellow card) 88'; S. Thomas (yellow card) 90+5'	Stadium: Coventry Building Society Arena; Attendance: 31,410; Referee: Lewis Smith
Note: Fixture was originally scheduled for a 15:00 kick-off, but was rescheduled for live Sky Sports broadcasting.

20 January 2026 28	Wrexham	1–1	Leicester City	Wrexham
20:00 GMT	O'Brien 63'; Doyle (yellow card) 90+4'	Report	Ayew (yellow card) 68'; Vestergaard 90'; Pereira (yellow card) 90+4'	Stadium: Racecourse Ground; Attendance: 10,609; Referee: Matt Donohue
Note: Fixture was originally scheduled for a 19:45 kick-off, but was rescheduled for live Sky Sports broadcasting.

24 January 2026 29	Leicester City	1–2	Oxford United	Leicester
15:00 GMT	Fatawu 84'	Report	Long 4'; Brannagan (yellow card) 44'; Currie (yellow card) 59'; Harris 71'; Phillips (yellow card) 85'	Stadium: King Power Stadium; Attendance: 30,479; Referee: James Linington

31 January 2026 30	Leicester City	0–2	Charlton Athletic	Leicester
12:30 GMT	Okoli (red card) 15'	Report	Carey 36'; Dykes (yellow card) 40', (goal) 45+4'; Clarke (yellow card) 52'	Stadium: King Power Stadium; Attendance: 28,730; Referee: Andrew Kitchen
Note: Fixture was originally scheduled for a 15:00 kick-off, but was rescheduled for live Sky Sports broadcasting.

7 February 2026 31	Birmingham City	2–1	Leicester City	Birmingham
15:00 GMT	Osman 3'; Stansfield 67'	Report	Aribo (yellow card) 5'; Fatawu 21'; De Cordova-Reid (red card) 32'; Begović (yellow card) 84'	Stadium: St Andrew's; Attendance: 27,886; Referee: John Busby

10 February 2026 32	Leicester City	3–4	Southampton	Leicester
19:45 GMT	Mukasa 9'; Daka 13'; Fatawu 29'	Report	Jander (yellow card) 30'; Stewart 61'; Stephens 82'; Manning 87'; Charles 90+6'	Stadium: King Power Stadium; Attendance: 25,827; Referee: Ben Toner
Note: Fixture was initially scheduled for 14 February, but was rearranged due to both clubs continued participation in the FA Cup.

21 February 2026 33	Stoke City	2–2	Leicester City	Stoke-on-Trent
12:30 GMT	Wilmot 3', 89'; Pearson (yellow card) 50'; S. Thomas (yellow card) 70'	Report	Mukasa 52'; L. Thomas (yellow card) 70'; Winks 76'	Stadium: bet365 Stadium; Attendance: 23,997; Referee: Gavin Ward
Note: Fixture was originally scheduled for a 15:00 kick-off, but was rescheduled for live Sky Sports broadcasting.

24 February 2026 34	Middlesbrough	1–1	Leicester City	Middlesbrough
19:45 GMT	Ayling (yellow card) 43'; McGree 45+2'	Report	Okoli 18'; Mukasa (yellow card) 53'	Stadium: Riverside Stadium; Attendance: 26,019; Referee: Andrew Kitchen

28 February 2026 35	Leicester City	0–2	Norwich City	Leicester
12:30 GMT	Okoli (yellow card) 57'; L. Thomas (yellow card) 64'	Report	Córdoba (yellow card) 60'; Gibbs (yellow card) 64'; Ben Slimane 68'; Ahmed 78'	Stadium: King Power Stadium; Attendance: 29,136; Referee: Adam Herczeg
Note: Fixture was originally scheduled for a 15:00 kick-off, but was rescheduled for live Sky Sports broadcasting.

7 March 2026 36	Ipswich Town	1–1	Leicester City	Ipswich
15:00 GMT	Burns (yellow card) 34'; Núñez (yellow card) 58'; Walle Egeli 76'; Kipré (yellow card) 90+5'	Report	L. Thomas (yellow card) 19'; Daka 39'; De Cordova-Reid (yellow card) 51'; James (yellow card) 90+5'	Stadium: Portman Road; Attendance: 28,709; Referee: John Busby

10 March 2026 37	Leicester City	2–0	Bristol City	Leicester
19:45 GMT	Nelson 13', (yellow card) 63'; Fatawu 28'; Choudhury (yellow card) 36'	Report	Borges (yellow card) 61'; Armstrong (yellow card) 90+1'; Morsy (yellow card) 90+4'	Stadium: King Power Stadium; Attendance: 25,476; Referee: Tom Nield

14 March 2026 38	Leicester City	1–3	Queens Park Rangers	Leicester
15:00 GMT	James 14'; Nelson (yellow card) 25'	Report	Kone (yellow card) 28'; Vale 43'; Nelson 50' (o.g.); Edwards 58'; Dunne (yellow card) 79'; Varane (yellow card) 83'	Stadium: King Power Stadium; Attendance: 27,494; Referee: Dean Whitestone

21 March 2026 39	Watford	0–0	Leicester City	Watford
15:00 GMT	Mendy (yellow card) 12'; Doumbia (yellow card) 90+1'; Selvik (yellow card) 90+2'	Report	Mavididi (yellow card) 17'; James (yellow card) 42'; Fatawu (yellow card) 54'; De Cordova-Reid (yellow card) 90+2'	Stadium: Vicarage Road; Attendance: 19,493; Referee: Josh Smith

3 April 2026 40	Leicester City	2–2	Preston North End	Leicester
15:00 BST	Daka 4', 81'; Fatawu (yellow card) 38'	Report	Moran (yellow card) 15'; Hughes (yellow card) 21'; Moran 38'; Whiteman 45'; Lindsay (yellow card) 57'; Storey (yellow card) 64'	Stadium: King Power Stadium; Attendance: 28,797; Referee: Ben Speedie

6 April 2026 41	Sheffield Wednesday	1–1	Leicester City	Sheffield
15:00 BST	Yates 2'	Report	Ayew 84'	Stadium: Hillsborough; Attendance: 24,223; Referee: Oliver Langford

11 April 2026 42	Leicester City	0–1	Swansea City	Leicester
15:00 BST	Vestergaard (yellow card) 10'; Thomas (yellow card) 59'	Report	Vipotnik 53'	Stadium: King Power Stadium; Attendance: 27,386; Referee: Sam Allison

18 April 2026 43	Portsmouth	1–0	Leicester City	Portsmouth
12:30 BST	Bowat 63'; Pack (yellow card) 90'; Brown (yellow card) 90+2'	Report	Choudhury (yellow card) 70'; Daka (yellow card) 75'; Ayew (yellow card) 90'	Stadium: Fratton Park; Attendance: 20,344; Referee: Gavin Ward

21 April 2026 44	Leicester City	2–2	Hull City	Leicester
19:45 BST	Thomas (yellow card) 34'; James 52' (pen.); Thomas 54'; Skipp (yellow card) 70'; Winks (yellow card) 86'	Report	Millar 18'; Giles (yellow card) 35'; McBurnie 63'; Pandur (yellow card) 85'	Stadium: King Power Stadium; Referee: Thomas Kirk
Note: Fixture was originally scheduled for 22 April, but was brought forward a day due to the Millwall fixture rearranged for the following Friday.

24 April 2026 45	Leicester City	1–1	Millwall	Leicester
20:00 BST	Choudhury (yellow card) 72'; Souttar 78'	Report	Cooper (yellow card) 50'; Azeez (yellow card) 60'; Ballo (yellow card) 67'; Langstaff 90'	Stadium: King Power Stadium; Attendance: 28,729; Referee: Farai Hallam
Note: Fixture was originally scheduled for 25 April, but was brought forward a day for live Sky Sports broadcasting.

2 May 2026 46	Blackburn Rovers	0–1	Leicester City	Blackburn
12:30 BST	McLoughlin (yellow card) 62'	Report	Pereira (yellow card) 54'; Mavididi 78'	Stadium: Ewood Park; Attendance: 19,436; Referee: Leigh Doughty

=== EFL Cup ===
The first round draw was complete on 26 June 2025, and Leicester were drawn away to Huddersfield Town. Leicester drew 2–2 in normal time, and lost 3–2 in the penalty shootout.

Win Draw Loss Fixtures

13 August 2025 First round	Huddersfield Town	2–2 (3–2 p)	Leicester City	Huddersfield
19:45 BST	Vost 65'; Roughan (yellow card) 68'; Ashia 76'; Smith-Sway (yellow card) 90+3'	Report	Monga (yellow card) 14'; Choudhury 54'; Winks 68'	Stadium: Kirklees Stadium; Attendance: 6,884; Referee: David Webb
	Penalties
	Taylor (penalty missed); May (penalty scored); Castledine (penalty scored); Sørensen (penalty scored)		(penalty missed) Ayew; (penalty scored) Mavididi; (penalty scored) L. Thomas; (penalty missed) El Khannouss; (penalty missed) McAteer

=== FA Cup ===
The third round draw was complete on 8 December 2025, and Leicester were drawn away to Cheltenham Town, where they won 0–2. The fourth round draw was complete on 12 January 2026, and Leicester were drawn away to Southampton.

Win Draw Loss Fixtures

10 January 2026 Third round	Cheltenham Town	0–2	Leicester City	Cheltenham
12:15 GMT	Tomkinson (yellow card) 87'	Report	Daka 23'; Mavididi 45'; Thomas (yellow card) 87'	Stadium: Whaddon Road; Attendance: 6,677; Referee: James Linington

14 February 2026 Fourth round	Southampton	2–1 (a.e.t.)	Leicester City	Southampton
15:00 GMT	Larin 45+1' (pen.); Bragg (yellow card) 86'; Manning (yellow card) 101'; Bree 109'	Report	Page (yellow card) 27'; Skipp 52'; Nelson (yellow card) 56'; Thomas (yellow card) 83'; Okoli (yellow card) 120+1'	Stadium: St Mary's Stadium; Attendance: 17,359; Referee: Matt Corlett

== Statistics ==
=== Appearances and goals ===
Players with no appearances are not included on the list; italics indicate a loaned in player

No.	Pos	Nat	Player	Total		Championship		FA Cup		EFL Cup	
No.	Pos	Nat	Player	Apps	Goals	Apps	Goals	Apps	Goals	Apps	Goals
1	GK	(Poland) POL	Jakub Stolarczyk	38	0	36	0	1	0	1	0
4	DF	(England) ENG	Ben Nelson	27	1	22+2	1	2	0	1	0
5	DF	(Italy) ITA	Caleb Okoli	31	1	27+2	1	1+1	0	0	0
6	MF	(Wales) WAL	Jordan James	34	11	27+7	11	0	0	0	0
7	FW	(Ghana) GHA	Abdul Fatawu	44	9	43+1	9	0	0	0	0
8	MF	(England) ENG	Harry Winks	36	2	26+8	1	0+1	0	0+1	1
9	FW	(Ghana) GHA	Jordan Ayew	45	6	24+18	6	1+1	0	0+1	0
10	FW	(England) ENG	Stephy Mavididi	45	4	34+8	3	2	1	0+1	0
12	FW	(Jamaica) JAM	Dujuan Richards	4	0	0+3	0	0+1	0	0	0
14	FW	(Jamaica) JAM	Bobby De Cordova-Reid	36	5	23+13	5	0	0	0	0
15	DF	(Australia) AUS	Harry Souttar	2	1	2	1	0	0	0	0
16	DF	(Denmark) DEN	Victor Kristiansen	6	0	2+3	0	1	0	0	0
17	MF	(Bangladesh) BAN	Hamza Choudhury	32	1	17+13	0	1	0	1	1
18	MF	(Nigeria) NGR	Joe Aribo	6	0	1+5	0	0	0	0	0
20	FW	(Zambia) ZAM	Patson Daka	44	6	21+20	5	1+1	1	1	0
21	DF	(Portugal) POR	Ricardo Pereira	39	2	31+7	2	0+1	0	0	0
22	MF	(England) ENG	Oliver Skipp	37	2	32+2	1	2	1	1	0
23	DF	(Denmark) DEN	Jannik Vestergaard	32	3	29+2	3	1	0	0	0
24	DF	(England) ENG	Jamaal Lascelles	9	0	7+2	0	0	0	0	0
25	MF	(England) ENG	Louis Page	20	0	5+12	0	2	0	0+1	0
27	MF	(Portugal) POR	Wanya Marçal	1	0	0	0	0+1	0	0	0
28	FW	(England) ENG	Jeremy Monga	30	1	8+19	1	1+1	0	1	0
29	MF	(England) ENG	Divine Mukasa	16	2	10+5	2	1	0	0	0
30	MF	(England) ENG	Aaron Ramsey	9	2	3+6	2	0	0	0	0
31	GK	(Bosnia and Herzegovina) BIH	Asmir Begović	12	0	10+1	0	1	0	0	0
33	DF	(England) ENG	Luke Thomas	46	1	39+4	1	1+1	0	1	0
39	FW	(England) ENG	Silko Thomas	18	1	1+15	1	1+1	0	0	0
56	DF	(England) ENG	Olabade Aluko	10	0	1+7	0	2	0	0	0
62	DF	(England) ENG	Kevon Gray	1	0	0+1	0	0	0	0	0
Out on loan:
3	DF	(Belgium) BEL	Wout Faes	16	1	9+6	1	0	0	1	0
37	MF	(England) ENG	Will Alves	1	0	0	0	0	0	1	0
Left club during season:
2	DF	(England) ENG	James Justin	2	0	2	0	0	0	0	0
11	MF	(Morocco) MAR	Bilal El Khannouss	3	0	2	0	0	0	0+1	0
18	FW	(Argentina) ARG	Julián Carranza	9	0	3+6	0	0	0	0	0
24	MF	(France) FRA	Boubakary Soumaré	17	0	9+7	0	0	0	1	0
35	MF	(Republic of Ireland) IRL	Kasey McAteer	3	0	0+2	0	0	0	1	0

=== Goalscorers ===
Rank	No.	Pos.	Nat.	Player	Championship	FA Cup	EFL Cup	Total
1	6	MF	(Wales)	Jordan James	11	0	0	11
2	7	FW	(Ghana)	Abdul Fatawu	9	0	0	9
3=	9	FW	(Ghana)	Jordan Ayew	6	0	0	6
3=	20	FW	(Zambia)	Patson Daka	5	1	0	6
5	14	FW	(Jamaica)	Bobby De Cordova-Reid	5	0	0	5
6	10	FW	(England)	Stephy Mavididi	3	1	0	4
7	23	DF	(Denmark)	Jannik Vestergaard	3	0	0	3
8=	21	DF	(Portugal)	Ricardo Pereira	2	0	0	2
8=	29	MF	(England)	Divine Mukasa	2	0	0	2
8=	30	MF	(England)	Aaron Ramsey	2	0	0	2
8=	22	MF	(England)	Oliver Skipp	1	1	0	2
8=	8	MF	(England)	Harry Winks	1	0	1	2
13=	3	DF	(Belgium)	Wout Faes	1	0	0	1
13=	4	DF	(England)	Ben Nelson	1	0	0	1
13=	5	DF	(Italy)	Caleb Okoli	1	0	0	1
13=	15	DF	(Australia)	Harry Souttar	1	0	0	1
13=	28	FW	(England)	Jeremy Monga	1	0	0	1
13=	33	DF	(England)	Luke Thomas	1	0	0	1
13=	39	FW	(England)	Silko Thomas	1	0	0	1
13=	17	MF	(Bangladesh)	Hamza Choudhury	0	0	1	1
Own goals					1	0	0	1
Total					58	3	2	63

=== Assists ===
Rank	No.	Pos.	Nat.	Player	Championship	FA Cup	EFL Cup	Total
1	7	FW	(Ghana)	Abdul Fatawu	7	0	0	7
2	33	DF	(England)	Luke Thomas	6	0	0	6
3=	6	MF	(Wales)	Jordan James	4	0	0	4
3=	14	MF	(Jamaica)	Bobby De Cordova-Reid	4	0	0	4
3=	20	FW	(Zambia)	Patson Daka	4	0	0	4
3=	10	FW	(England)	Stephy Mavididi	2	1	1	4
7=	9	FW	(Ghana)	Jordan Ayew	3	0	0	3
7=	29	MF	(England)	Divine Mukasa	3	0	0	3
9=	8	MF	(England)	Harry Winks	2	0	0	2
9=	11	MF	(Morocco)	Bilal El Khannouss	2	0	0	2
9=	24	MF	(France)	Boubakary Soumaré	2	0	0	2
9=	28	FW	(England)	Jeremy Monga	2	0	0	2
13=	3	DF	(Belgium)	Wout Faes	1	0	0	1
13=	4	DF	(England)	Ben Nelson	1	0	0	1
13=	5	DF	(Italy)	Caleb Okoli	1	0	0	1
13=	21	DF	(Portugal)	Ricardo Pereira	1	0	0	1
13=	25	MF	(England)	Louis Page	1	0	0	1
13=	22	MF	(England)	Oliver Skipp	0	1	0	1
Total					46	2	1	49

=== Clean sheets ===
Rank	No.	Pos.	Nat.	Player	Championship	FA Cup	EFL Cup	Total
1	1	GK	(Poland)	Jakub Stolarczyk	6	0	0	6
2	31	GK	(Bosnia and Herzegovina)	Asmir Begović	0	1	0	1
Total					6	1	0	7

=== Disciplinary record ===
No.	Pos.	Nat.	Player	Championship			FA Cup			EFL Cup			Total		
No.	Pos.	Nat.	Player	Yellow card	(yellow card) (yellow-red card)	Red card	Yellow card	(yellow card) (yellow-red card)	Red card	Yellow card	(yellow card) (yellow-red card)	Red card	Yellow card	(yellow card) (yellow-red card)	Red card
1	GK	(Poland)	Jakub Stolarczyk	1	0	0	0	0	0	0	0	0	1	0	0
3	DF	(Belgium)	Wout Faes	1	0	0	0	0	0	0	0	0	1	0	0
4	DF	(England)	Ben Nelson	3	0	0	1	0	0	0	0	0	4	0	0
5	DF	(Italy)	Caleb Okoli	2	0	1	1	0	0	0	0	0	3	0	1
6	MF	(Wales)	Jordan James	6	0	0	0	0	0	0	0	0	6	0	0
7	FW	(Ghana)	Abdul Fatawu	7	0	0	0	0	0	0	0	0	7	0	0
8	MF	(England)	Harry Winks	3	0	0	0	0	0	0	0	0	3	0	0
9	FW	(Ghana)	Jordan Ayew	5	0	0	0	0	0	0	0	0	5	0	0
10	FW	(England)	Stephy Mavididi	4	0	0	0	0	0	0	0	0	4	0	0
14	FW	(Jamaica)	Bobby De Cordova-Reid	3	0	1	0	0	0	0	0	0	3	0	1
17	MF	(Bangladesh)	Hamza Choudhury	7	0	0	0	0	0	0	0	0	7	0	0
18	FW	(Argentina)	Julián Carranza	1	0	0	0	0	0	0	0	0	1	0	0
18	MF	(Nigeria)	Joe Aribo	1	0	0	0	0	0	0	0	0	1	0	0
20	FW	(Zambia)	Patson Daka	2	0	0	0	0	0	0	0	0	2	0	0
21	DF	(Portugal)	Ricardo Pereira	7	0	0	0	0	0	0	0	0	7	0	0
22	MF	(England)	Oliver Skipp	5	0	0	0	0	0	0	0	0	5	0	0
23	DF	(Denmark)	Jannik Vestergaard	5	0	0	0	0	0	0	0	0	5	0	0
24	MF	(France)	Boubakary Soumaré	2	0	0	0	0	0	0	0	0	2	0	0
25	MF	(England)	Louis Page	0	0	0	1	0	0	0	0	0	1	0	0
28	FW	(England)	Jeremy Monga	2	0	0	0	0	0	1	0	0	3	0	0
29	MF	(England)	Divine Mukasa	1	0	0	0	0	0	0	0	0	1	0	0
30	MF	(England)	Aaron Ramsey	0	0	1	0	0	0	0	0	0	0	0	1
31	GK	(Bosnia and Herzegovina)	Asmir Begović	2	0	0	0	0	0	0	0	0	2	0	0
33	DF	(England)	Luke Thomas	11	0	0	2	0	0	0	0	0	13	0	0
39	FW	(England)	Silko Thomas	1	0	0	0	0	0	0	0	0	1	0	0
56	DF	(England)	Olabade Aluko	0	1	0	0	0	0	0	0	0	0	1	0
Total				82	1	3	5	0	0	1	0	0	88	1	3
