= Silko Thomas =

English footballer (born 2004)

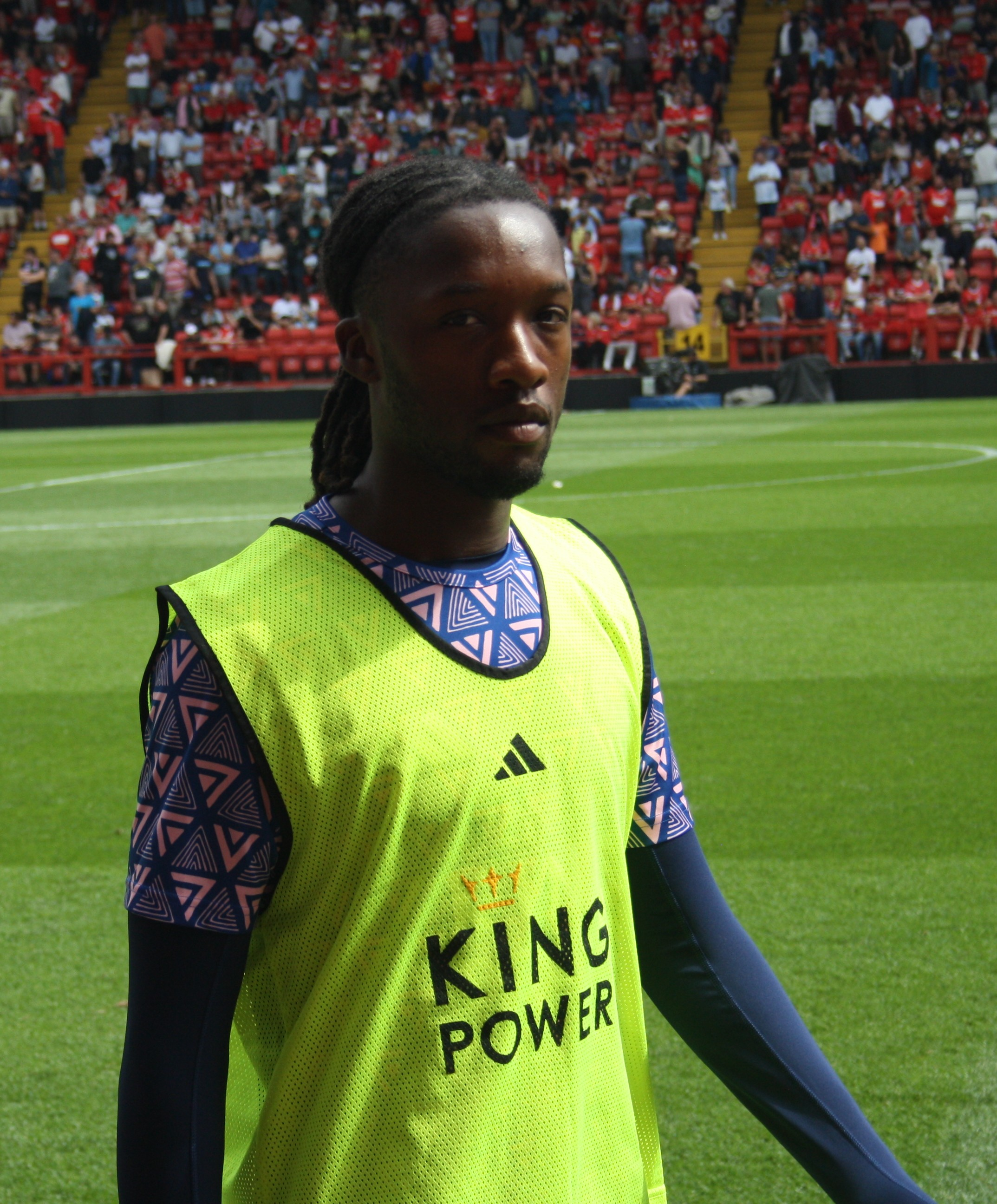
- Thomas in 2025

Personal information
- Full name: Silko-Amari Otieno Thomas
- Date of birth: 25 June 2004 (age 22)
- Place of birth: Lambeth, England
- Height: 5 ft 10 in (1.78 m)
- Positions: Left winger; left midfielder

Team information
- Current team: Wycombe Wanderers
- Number: 11

Youth career
- Carshalton Athletic
- –2023: Chelsea
- 2023–2024: Leicester City

Senior career*
Years	Team	Apps	(Gls)
2024–2026	Leicester City	17	(1)
2024–2025	→ Wigan Athletic (loan)	24	(0)
2026–	Wycombe Wanderers	0	(0)

International career
2021	England U18	1	(0)
- * Club domestic league appearances and goals as of 00:26, 29 May 2026 (UTC)

Silko-Amari Otieno Thomas (born 25 June 2004) is an English professional footballer who plays as a left winger or left midfielder for EFL League One club Wycombe Wanderers.

== Early life ==
Thomas was born in London.

== Club career ==
Thomas began his youth career with Carshalton Athletic. Two years later, he was scouted by Chelsea and joined their academy.

After being released by Chelsea, Thomas signed for Leicester City in the summer of 2023. He plays for the under-21s. He was awarded with Men's Development Player of the Season in Leicester by the end of his first season at the club.

On 26 July 2024, Thomas joined EFL League One club Wigan Athletic on a season-long loan. On 13 August 2024, he made his professional debut with Wigan in the first round of the League Cup, coming on as a substitute in the 61st minute of a 1–1 draw with Barnsley. He made his league debut four days later, starting in a 2–0 loss against Reading.

On 23 August 2025, Thomas made his debut for Leicester in the EFL Championship. He was brought on as a substitute for Jeremy Monga in the 73rd minute of a 1–0 away win against Charlton Athletic.

On 20 December 2025, he scored his first senior goal in a 4–1 defeat to Queen's Park Rangers at Loftus Road.

In July 2026, Thomas announced his departure from Leicester City via mutual consent. The next day he signed for EFL League One club Wycombe Wanderers.

== International career ==
Born in England, Thomas is of Kenyan and Jamaican descent. He is a youth international for England, having played for the England U18s.

== Career statistics ==
As of match played 2 May 2026

Appearances and goals by club, season and competition
Club	Season	League			FA Cup		League Cup		Other		Total	
Club	Season	Division	Apps	Goals	Apps	Goals	Apps	Goals	Apps	Goals	Apps	Goals
Chelsea U21	2021–22	—			—		—		1 (Note: Appearance in EFL Trophy)	0	1	0
Leicester City U21	2023–24	—			—		—		3	1	3	1
Wigan Athletic (loan)	2024–25	League One	24	0	3	0	1	0	3	0	31	0
Leicester City	2025–26	Championship	17	1	1	0	0	0	—		18	1
Wycombe Wanderers	2026–27	League One	0	0	0	0	0	0	—		0	0
Career total			41	1	4	0	1	0	7	1	53	2
