= Aaron James Ramsey =

Aaron James Ramsey may refer to:

- Aaron Ramsey (born 1990), Welsh association football player
- Aaron Ramsey (footballer, born 2003), English association football player
