= Dujuan Richards =

Jamaican footballer (born 2005)

Personal information
- Full name: Dujuan Odile Richards
- Date of birth: 10 November 2005 (age 21)
- Place of birth: Port Royal, Jamaica
- Height: 1.89 m (6 ft 2 in)
- Position: Forward

Team information
- Current team: AFC Wimbledon (on loan from Chelsea)
- Number: 31

Youth career
- 2017–2023: Phoenix Academy
- 2024–2026: Chelsea

Senior career*
| Years | Team | Apps | (Gls) |
| 2026– | Chelsea | 0 | (0) |
| 2026 | → Leicester City (loan) | 3 | (0) |
| 2026– | → AFC Wimbledon (loan) | 2 | (0) |

International career^{‡}
| 2023– | Jamaica | 14 | (2) |
- * Club domestic league appearances and goals as of 00:40, 1 November 2026 (UTC) ‡ National team caps and goals as of 18 November 2025

Dujuan Odile Richards (born 10 November 2005) is a Jamaican professional footballer who plays as a forward for EFL League One club AFC Wimbledon on loan from Premier League club Chelsea and the Jamaica national team.

== Club career ==
Richards was born in Port Royal. He started his career with the Phoenix Football Academy at the age of eleven where he remained right up to his signing with Chelsea. In addition, Richards, also played for secondary school football for Kingston College in Jamaica. He also spent time with the Brooke House College's football academy in Leicestershire, England.

Following impressive performances on several tours of Europe, he went on trial in Premier League side Newcastle United in February 2023. Richards was quoted as saying he was "expecting to hear positively” from the Magpies.

=== Chelsea ===
In March 2023, it was reported that Richards signed a pre-contract deal with Chelsea. On 24 June 2023, it was announced that Richards would join the club after his 18th birthday. The move was officially completed on 12 January 2024. On 8 February 2024, Richards debuted for Chelsea under-18s in a FA Youth Cup tie.

==== Leicester City (loan) ====
On 2 February 2026, Richards joined Leicester City on loan for the remainder of the season.

==== AFC Wimbledon (loan) ====
On 1 September 2026, Richards joined EFL League One club AFC Wimbledon on loan.

== International career ==
Richards' grandmother is English, and was eligible to represent England at international level.

In March 2023, Richards was called up to the Jamaican senior team for a friendly game against Trinidad and Tobago, with manager Heimir Hallgrímsson stating that he was "ready" to represent the nation, despite his young age. He went on to make his debut in the match on 12 March.

In June 2023, Richards was named to the final squad for the 2023 CONCACAF Gold Cup. In Jamaica's second match of the tournament against Trinidad and Tobago on June 28, he scored his first goal, netting the final tally in a 4–1 victory. He became the youngest goalscorer for Jamaica in CONCACAF Gold Cup.

== Personal life ==
Richards hails from a sporting family, with uncle Nick playing basketball professionally in the NBA for the Chicago Bulls, while another uncle, O'Neil, represented the nation in cricket.

== Career statistics ==
=== Club ===
As of match played 17 September 2026

Appearances and goals by club, season and competition
| Club | Season | League | | | FA Cup | | EFL Cup | | Other | | Total | |
| Club | Season | Division | Apps | Goals | Apps | Goals | Apps | Goals | Apps | Goals | Apps | Goals |
|---|---|---|---|---|---|---|---|---|---|---|---|---|
| Chelsea U21 | 2025–26 | — | | | — | | — | | 1 (Note: Appearance in EFL Trophy) | 0 | 1 | 0 |
| Leicester City (loan) | 2025–26 | EFL Championship | 3 | 0 | 1 | 0 | 0 | 0 | 0 | 0 | 4 | 0 |
| AFC Wimbledon (loan) | 2026–27 | EFL League One | 1 | 0 | 0 | 0 | — | | 0 | 0 | 1 | 0 |
| Career total | | | 4 | 0 | 1 | 0 | 0 | 0 | 1 | 0 | 6 | 0 |

=== International ===
As of match played 18 November 2025.

| National team | Year | Apps | Goals |
|---|---|---|---|
| Jamaica | 2023 | 10 | 1 |
| Jamaica | 2024 | 0 | 0 |
| Jamaica | 2025 | 4 | 1 |
| Total | | 14 | 2 |

Scores and results list Jamaica's goal tally first, score column indicates score after each Richards goal.

List of international goals scored by Dujuan Richards
| No. | Date | Venue | Opponent | Score | Result | Competition |
|---|---|---|---|---|---|---|
| 1 | 28 June 2023 | CityPark, St. Louis, United States | Trinidad and Tobago | 4–1 | 4–1 | 2023 CONCACAF Gold Cup |
| 2 | 14 October 2025 | Independence Park, Kingston, Jamaica | Bermuda | 4–0 | 4–0 | 2026 FIFA World Cup qualification |
