= Xavi Calm =

Spanish football manager (born 1981)

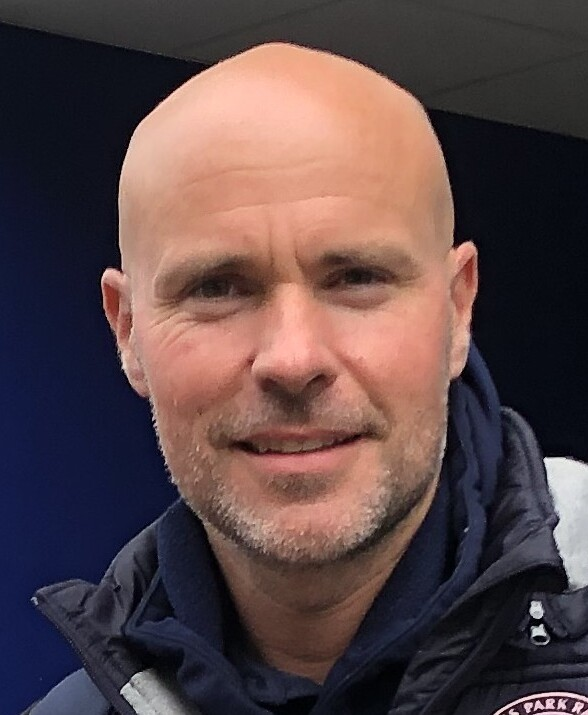
- Calm in 2025

Personal information
- Full name: Xavier Calm Sans
- Date of birth: 3 September 1981 (age 45)
- Place of birth: Castellar del Vallès, Spain

Managerial career
- Years: Team
- UF Jábac (youth)
- –2013: Sabadell (youth)
- 2013–2014: Rubí (assistant)
- 2014: Sant Andreu (assistant)
- 2015–2016: Hospitalet (assistant)
- 2016–2018: Cornellà (assistant)
- 2018–2019: Cornellà
- 2019–2020: Birmingham City (assistant)
- 2020–2021: Atlético Baleares (assistant)
- 2021–2022: Atlético Baleares
- 2022–2023: Hammarby IF (assistant)
- 2023–2025: Queens Park Rangers (assistant)
- 2025–2026: Leicester City (assistant)

Xavier Calm Sans (born 3 September 1981) is a Spanish football manager, who was most recently the assistant manager at EFL Championship side Leicester City.

== Career ==
Born in Castellar del Vallès, Barcelona, Catalonia, Calm began his coaching career in the youth systems at UF Jábac i Terrassa and at Sabadell, he then made the leap to professional football as he was named as Martí Cifuentes' assistant coach at Rubí, Sant Andreu and Hospitalet respectively.

In the summer of 2016, Calm was named as the assistant manager at Cornellà; where he spent two years working under Jordi Roger, before taking over as manager on the 19 June 2018 with the side in Segunda División B. On 10 June 2019 after just a single season in charge, Calm left Cornellá - which ended his three-year stay at the club.

On 4 July 2019, Calm moved abroad for the first time in his career as he joined English side Birmingham City as assistant manager to fellow Spaniard Pep Clotet, on 2 May 2020, Calm left Birmingham for personal reasons to take care of his family.

On 4 August 2020, he returned to Spain to become assistant coach at Atlético Baleares in Segunda Division B, forming part of Jordi Roger's coaching staff once again. On 9 March of the following year, Calm took over as manager of the first team, following the sacking of Jordi Roger. He renewed his contract for a further year on 12 May 2021, after he won six of eight matches in charge during the previous campaign and earned the side a place in the newly formed Primera Federación. However, on 28 February 2022, Calm was sacked after a run of three defeats in the last six league games.

After leaving Baleares, Calm linked up once again with Martí Cifuentes as he was his assistant manager at Swedish side Hammarby IF and then took up the same role at English side, Queens Park Rangers in November 2023.

Calm yet again linked up with Martí Cifuentes, joining him as assistant manager at Leicester City in July 2025.

== Managerial statistics ==
As of 23 February 2025

Managerial record by team and tenure
Team	Nat	From	To	Record								Ref
Team	Nat	From	To	G	W	D	L	GF	GA	GD	Win %	Ref
Cornellà	(Spain)	19 June 2018	10 June 2019	51	21	19	11	64	50	+14	41.18	
Atlético Baleares	(Spain)	9 March 2021	28 February 2022	37	19	9	9	54	32	+22	51.35	
Total				88	40	28	20	118	82	+36	45.45	—
