= Luke Thomas (footballer, born 2001) =

English footballer

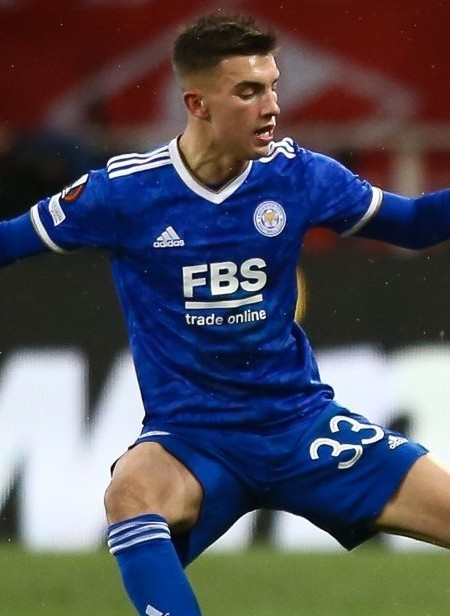
- Thomas playing for Leicester City in 2021

Personal information
- Full name: Luke Jonathan Thomas
- Date of birth: 10 June 2001 (age 25)
- Place of birth: Syston, Leicestershire, England
- Height: 1.81 m (5 ft 11 in)
- Positions: Left-back; left wing-back

Team information
- Current team: Leicester City
- Number: 33

Youth career
- 2008–2020: Leicester City

Senior career*
Years	Team	Apps	(Gls)
2020–	Leicester City	123	(3)
2023–2024	→ Sheffield United (loan)	12	(0)
2024	→ Middlesbrough (loan)	12	(0)

International career
2018–2019	England U18	4	(0)
2019	England U19	4	(0)
2020	England U20	1	(0)
2021–2023	England U21	15	(0)
Medal record
Representing England
UEFA European Under-21 Championship
Winner	2023 Georgia–Romania
- * Club domestic league appearances and goals as of 21:46, 20 October 2026 (UTC)

Luke Jonathan Thomas (born 10 June 2001) is an English professional footballer who plays as a left-back or centre-back for EFL League One club Leicester City.

== Club career ==
Thomas was born in Syston, Leicestershire and joined the Leicester City Academy in 2008 from local club Riverside United Juniors Football Club. He made his professional debut in a 2–0 Premier League win against Sheffield United on 16 July 2020. He came on as a result of an injury to first team left back Ben Chilwell, providing an assist for the first goal, which was scored by Ayoze Pérez. On 25 August, it was announced that he had signed a new long-term deal with the club.

On 29 October 2020, Thomas made his European debut in the UEFA Europa League during a 2–1 win over AEK Athens replacing Christian Fuchs in 46th minute. On 26 November, Thomas scored his first Leicester goal in a 3–3 away draw against Braga in the group stage of the Europa League.

On 11 May 2021, Thomas scored his first Premier League goal for Leicester City in a 2–1 away victory over Manchester United, their first win at Old Trafford since 1998. Four days later he started in the 2021 FA Cup final which saw Leicester beat Chelsea to win the trophy for the first time in their history. On 7 August 2021 Thomas came off the bench as a second-half substitute as Leicester defeated Manchester City in the 2021 FA Community Shield.

Thomas was one of four City players who went on loan for the 2023–4 season which saw the team start in the EFL Championship after a shock relegation from the Premier League. On 31 August 2023, Thomas joined Premier League club Sheffield United on a season long loan. On 12 January 2024, his loan was mutually terminated and he returned to Leicester. He joined EFL Championship club Middlesbrough on loan for the rest of the season later in the same month.

Thomas played for Leicester City on their return to the Premier League for the 2024–5 season. He started in 13 of the 14 matches he played in that season. These took place after Ruud van Nistelrooy took over managing the club on 29 November 2024.

On 13 September 2025, Thomas signed a four contract at Leicester City who returned to the EFL Championship for the 2025–6 season. At that time he had been in the starting XI for every league and cup match.

== International career ==
Having represented England at U18 and U19 level, Thomas made his England U20 debut during a 2–0 victory over Wales at St. George's Park on 13 October 2020.

On 27 August 2021, Thomas received his first call up for the England U21s. On 7 September 2021, he made his England U21 debut during the 2–0 2023 UEFA European Under-21 Championship qualification win over Kosovo U21s at Stadium MK.

On 14 June 2023, Thomas was included in the England squad for the 2023 UEFA European Under-21 Championship. He started in the semi-final victory over Israel. Thomas was an unused substitute in the final as England beat Spain to win the tournament.

== Personal life ==
Thomas was included in the official UEFA Euro 2024 sticker book, despite never being selected for the senior England team. This was due to new manufacturers Topps not having the image rights to certain England players, whose rights were retained by Panini Group.

== Career statistics ==
As of match played 30 October 2026

Appearances and goals by club, season and competition
Club	Season	League			FA Cup		EFL Cup		Europe		Other		Total	
Club	Season	Division	Apps	Goals	Apps	Goals	Apps	Goals	Apps	Goals	Apps	Goals	Apps	Goals
Leicester City U23	2018–19	—			—		—		—		1 (Note: Appearance(s) in EFL Trophy)	0	1	0
Leicester City U23	2019–20	—			—		—		—		5	0	5	0
Leicester City U23	2020–21	—			—		—		—		0	0	0	0
Leicester City U23	Total		—		—		—		—		6	0	6	0
Leicester City	2019–20	Premier League	3	0	0	0	0	0	—		—		3	0
Leicester City	2020–21	Premier League	14	1	3	0	1	0	7 (Note: Appearances in UEFA Europa League)	1	—		25	2
Leicester City	2021–22	Premier League	22	0	1	0	3	0	6 (Note: Three appearances in UEFA Europa League, three appearances in UEFA Europa Conference League)	0	1 (Note: Appearance in FA Community Shield)	0	33	0
Leicester City	2022–23	Premier League	17	0	3	0	4	0	—		—		24	0
Leicester City	2024–25	Premier League	14	0	1	0	3	0	—		—		18	0
Leicester City	2025–26	Championship	43	1	2	0	1	0	—		—		46	1
Leicester City	2026–27	League One	10	1	0	0	2	0	—		2	0	14	1
Leicester City	Total		123	3	10	0	14	0	13	1	3	0	163	4
Sheffield United (loan)	2023–24	Premier League	12	0	1	0	0	0	—		—		13	0
Middlesbrough (loan)	2023–24	Championship	12	0	—		—		—		—		12	0
Career total			147	3	11	0	14	0	13	1	9	0	194	4

== Honours ==
Leicester City

- FA Cup: 2020–21
- FA Community Shield: 2021

England U21

- UEFA European Under-21 Championship: 2023
