= Oliver Skipp =

English footballer (born 2000)

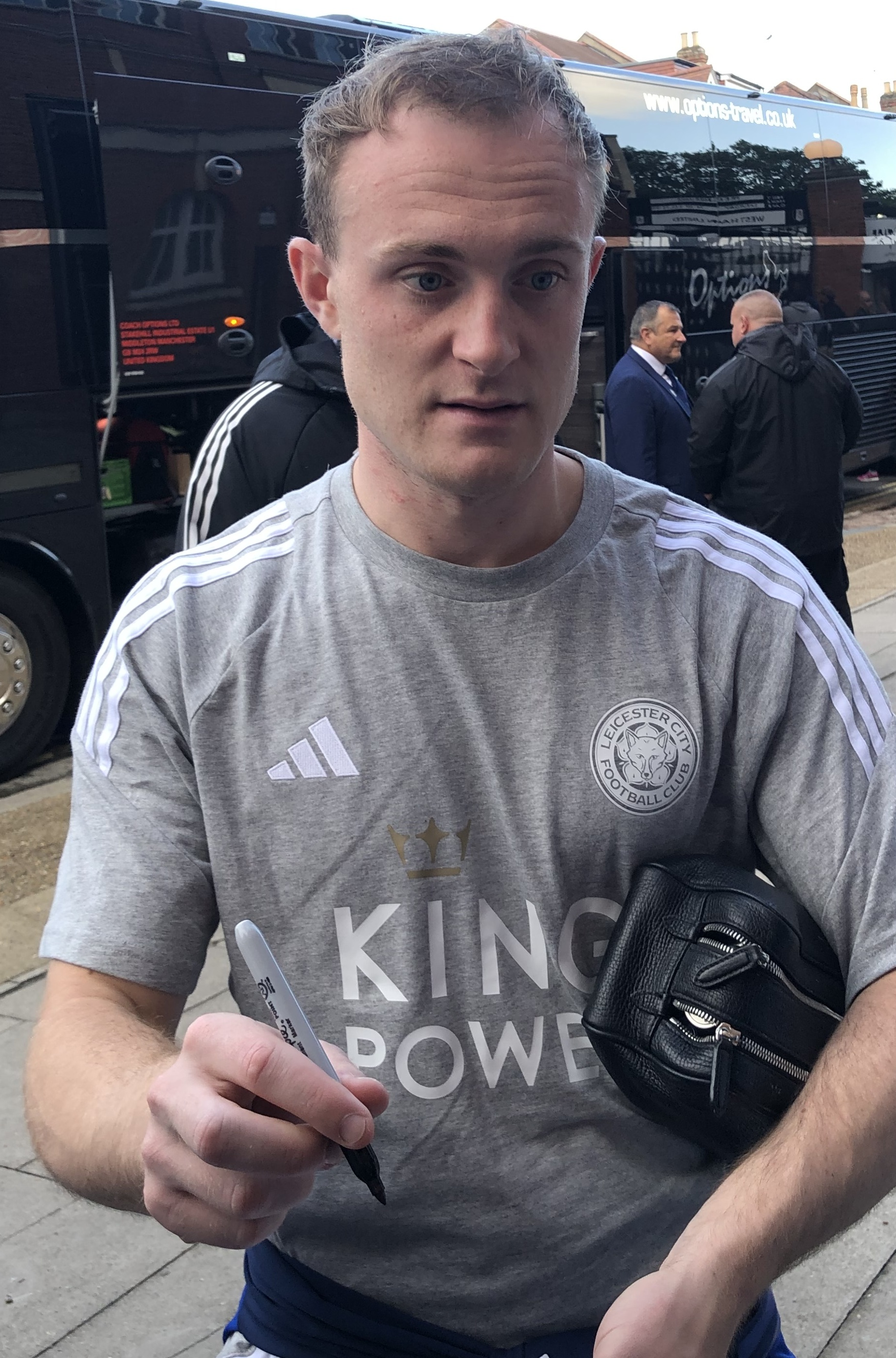
- Skipp with Leicester City in 2024

Personal information
- Full name: Oliver William Skipp
- Date of birth: 16 September 2000 (age 26)
- Place of birth: Welwyn Garden City, Hertfordshire, England
- Height: 5 ft 9 in (1.75 m)
- Position: Defensive midfielder

Team information
- Current team: Charlton Athletic (on loan from Leicester City)
- Number: 34

Youth career
- Bengeo Tigers FC
- 2008–2018: Tottenham Hotspur

Senior career*
Years	Team	Apps	(Gls)
2018–2024	Tottenham Hotspur	77	(1)
2020–2021	→ Norwich City (loan)	45	(1)
2024–	Leicester City	60	(1)
2026–	→ Charlton Athletic (loan)	10	(0)

International career
2015–2016	England U16	13	(0)
2016	England U17	1	(0)
2017–2018	England U18	3	(0)
2019–2023	England U21	24	(0)
Medal record
Representing England
UEFA European Under-21 Championship
Winner	2023 Georgia–Romania
- * Club domestic league appearances and goals as of 17:10, 21 November 2026 (UTC)

Oliver William Skipp (born 16 September 2000) is an English professional footballer who plays as a defensive midfielder for EFL Championship club Charlton Athletic, on loan from the EFL League One club Leicester City.

== Early life ==
Oliver William Skipp was born in Welwyn Garden City on 16 September 2000, and he grew up in Hertford. From 2003 to 2012, he attended Duncombe Primary School and Richard Hale School in Hertford.

== Club career ==
=== Tottenham Hotspur ===
Skipp started his youth career with Bengeo Tigers FC in Hertford before joining Tottenham Hotspur in 2008. On 29 August 2018, Skipp signed a three-year contract with Tottenham. He made his professional debut for Tottenham in a 3–1 EFL Cup win over West Ham United on 31 October. He made his league debut in a home match against Southampton, coming on as a late substitute in a 3–1 win, and made his first start on 15 December in a 1–0 win against Burnley. In January 2019, Skipp assisted two goals in Tottenham's 7–0 win against Tranmere Rovers in the FA Cup.

On 17 July 2020, Skipp signed a new three-year contract with the option of a fourth with Tottenham. For the 2020–21, season he joined Norwich City on loan. Skipp scored the first goal of his career in Norwich's 3–1 win at Birmingham City on 23 February 2021. Skipp went on to help Norwich win the Championship and was included in the 2021 PFA Team of the Year.

Skipp established himself as a regular starter for Tottenham in the first half of the 2021-22 season, making 18 appearances before suffering a pelvic injury in January, which saw him miss the rest of the season. On 20 April 2022, Skipp signed a new five-year contract with Tottenham. Skipp made his return from injury in a pre-season friendly on 13 July 2022. On 26 February 2023, in the London derby against Chelsea, he scored the opener 19 seconds after the second half restart for his first senior goal for Spurs and his first in two years.

=== Leicester City ===
On 19 August 2024, Leicester City announced that they had reached an agreement with Tottenham Hotspur to sign Skipp on a five-year deal for a £20 million transfer fee. He made his debut for the club on 24 August 2024 in a 2–1 defeat to Fulham, coming off the bench in the 71st minute.

==== Charlton Athletic (loan) ====
On 1 September 2026, Skipp was loaned to Championship side Charlton Athletic on a season-long loan.

== International career ==
Skipp has represented England at Under-16, Under-17, Under-18 and Under-21 levels.

On 30 August 2019, Skipp was included in the England U21 squad for the first time. He eventually made his U21 debut on 11 October 2019 as a substitute during a 2–2 draw against Slovenia in Maribor. Skipp was a member of the squad that were eliminated at the group stage of the 2021 UEFA European Under-21 Championship.

On 14 June 2023, Skipp was included in the England squad for the 2023 UEFA European Under-21 Championship. He came off the bench as a second-half substitute in the final as England defeated Spain to win the tournament.

== Style of play ==
Skipp operates as a defensive midfielder, and is known for his ability to break up play and win the ball.

Then-teammate Grant Hanley said of Skipp in January 2021 that "he has experience beyond his years," and praised his ability to read the game and make decisions under pressure.

== Career statistics ==
As of match played 21 November 2026

Appearances and goals by club, season and competition
Club	Season	League			FA Cup		EFL Cup		Europe		Other		Total	
Club	Season	Division	Apps	Goals	Apps	Goals	Apps	Goals	Apps	Goals	Apps	Goals	Apps	Goals
Tottenham Hotspur U23	2017–18	—			—		—		—		2 (Note: Appearance(s) in EFL Trophy)	0	2	0
Tottenham Hotspur U23	2018–19	—			—		—		—		1	0	1	0
Tottenham Hotspur U23	Total		—		—		—		—		3	0	3	0
Tottenham Hotspur	2018–19	Premier League	8	0	2	0	2	0	0	0	—		12	0
Tottenham Hotspur	2019–20	Premier League	7	0	1	0	1	0	2 (Note: Appearances in UEFA Champions League)	0	—		11	0
Tottenham Hotspur	2020–21	Premier League	0	0	0	0	0	0	0	0	—		0	0
Tottenham Hotspur	2021–22	Premier League	18	0	1	0	5	0	4 (Note: Appearances in UEFA Europa Conference League)	0	—		28	0
Tottenham Hotspur	2022–23	Premier League	23	1	3	0	1	0	4	0	—		31	1
Tottenham Hotspur	2023–24	Premier League	21	0	2	0	1	0	—		—		24	0
Tottenham Hotspur	Total		77	1	9	0	10	0	10	0	—		106	1
Norwich City (loan)	2020–21	Championship	45	1	2	0	0	0	—		—		47	1
Leicester City	2024–25	Premier League	24	0	1	0	3	0	—		—		28	0
Leicester City	2025–26	Championship	34	1	2	1	1	0	—		—		37	2
Leicester City	2026–27	League One	2	0	0	0	1	0	—		—		3	0
Leicester City	Total		60	1	3	1	5	0	—		—		68	2
Charlton Athletic (loan)	2026–27	Championship	10	0	0	0	—		—		—		10	0
Career total			192	3	14	1	15	0	10	0	3	0	234	4

== Honours ==
Norwich City

- EFL Championship: 2020–21

England U21

- UEFA European Under-21 Championship: 2023

Individual

- PFA Team of the Year: 2020–21 Championship
