= Leicester City F.C. Under-21s and Academy =

Leicester City F.C. Under-21s
- Full name: Leicester City Football Club Under-21s and Academy
- Nickname: The Foxes
- Ground: Leicester City F.C. Training Ground, Seagrave
- Capacity: 499
- Owner: King Power
- Chairman: Aiyawatt Srivaddhanaprabha
- Manager: Leon McSweeney (Under-21s); Matt Rains (Under-18s); Matt Goodwin (Under-16s)
- League: Premier League 2 and Premier League U18
- Website: www.lcfc.co.uk
Home colours	Away colours	Third colours

Leicester City Under-21s are the former reserve team of Leicester City. The team mainly consists of under-21 players at the club, although senior players occasionally play in the reserve side, for instance when they are recovering from injury. The Under-21s team play in Premier League 2.

Leicester City F.C. Academy are the youth team of Leicester City directed by Jon Rudkin. Leicester City's academy has held Category 1 status under the Elite Player Performance Plan since July 2013.

== History ==
Although less famous than the likes of Manchester United or West Ham United's youth systems, the Leicester City Academy has been one of the more productive academies in the East Midlands. England internationals Peter Shilton, Gary Lineker, David Nish, Steve Whitworth, Emile Heskey, Ben Chilwell and Harvey Barnes as well as Don Revie, who played for and managed England all began their careers with the Foxes. Frank McLintock, a Scottish international, former footballer of the year and a double winning captain with Arsenal, who was described by Bob Paisley as the "player of the decade" at the end of the 1970s also came through the Foxes' ranks. Leicester's all-time top appearance makers Graham Cross and Sep Smith were also among notable products of the academy.

On 8 April 2013, Leicester City Under 21s won the newly formed 2012–13 Professional Development League 2 with a game to go, qualifying for the knockout stage. However they exited the national play-off at the semi-final stage, after losing 3–2 to Cardiff.

On 26 May 2013, the Leicester City Development Squad & Academy won the HKFC International Soccer Sevens cup, beating Newcastle United Reserves and Academy 2–0 thanks to goals from Michael Cain and Harry Panayiotou. The latter also went on to win player of the tournament. On 4 July, it was announced that Leicester City's academy had been awarded category one status, the highest level under the Premier League's Elite Player Performance Plan.

By finishing 6th in the 2013–14 Professional U21 Development League, Leicester City U21s qualified for the inaugural, 2014–15 edition, of the Premier League International Cup, being drawn in Group C with Manchester City, Benfica and Schalke 04. On 24 November 2014, Leicester City U21s became the first team to qualify for the quarter-finals, after defeating Schalke 04 and Benfica, both 2–0 at the King Power Stadium.

After having almost been relegated from Premier League 2 Division 1 in 2016–2017, Leicester Under 23s went on to finish third in PL2, while also getting to the semi-finals of the Premier League Cup. In addition, several of the under 23's gained first team experience under manager Claude Puel with Harvey Barnes and Hamza Choudhury playing prominent roles towards the end of the 2017–2018 season. This subsequently lead to Hamza Choudhury gaining his first England Under 21s cap during the Toulan Tournament.

On 13 June 2020 the club announced that long-serving coach Trevor Peake was stepping down from his role as Under-18s coach after 17 years of service. Former under 12–16 Youth Development Phase Coach Adam Barradell took responsibility of the Under-18s during the summer of 2020.

Having been in Premier League 2 Division 1 since its establishment as part of the Elite Player Performance Plan Leicester Under 23s were relegated to Division 2 on 10 May 2021 following a season that saw a number of under 23's players promoted to train with the first team due to a substantial injury list. However, following an expansion of Premier League 2 Division 2 to 14 clubs, Leicester Under 23s were reinstated to the top division for the upcoming 2021–2022 season despite finishing second from bottom during the previous season.

On 24 April 2023, after losing 1–4 against Everton, Leicester Under 23s were relegated to Division 2.

== Players ==
=== Under-21s ===
As of 4 September 2026

Note: Flags indicate national team as defined under FIFA eligibility rules; some limited exceptions apply. Players may hold more than one non-FIFA nationality.

No.	Pos.	Nation	Player
50	MF	ENG	Tommy Neale
51	GK	ENG	Harry French
56	FW	ENG	Lorenz Hutchinson
60	FW	SCO	Riley Carr
64	DF	ENG	Bobby Amartey
68	MF	ENG	Hugo De Lisle
69	DF	ENG	Mirsad Ali
73	FW	CZE	Josh King
74	MF	NIR	Ryan Donnelly

No.	Pos.	Nation	Player
75	DF	ENG	Reiss Khela
76	DF	ENG	Kevon Gray
—	GK	ENG	Freddie Marson
—	DF	ENG	Michael Toko
—	DF	ENG	Alpha Diallo
—	DF	CAN	Will Daniels
—	MF	POL	Bartosz Kosiorek
—	MF	ENG	Bless Akolbire
—	FW	ROU	David Anugo

==== Out on loan ====
Note: Flags indicate national team as defined under FIFA eligibility rules; some limited exceptions apply. Players may hold more than one non-FIFA nationality.

No.	Pos.	Nation	Player
66	MF	WAL	Logan Briggs (at Northampton Town until 30 June 2027)

=== Under-18s ===
As of 4 September 2026

Note: Flags indicate national team as defined under FIFA eligibility rules; some limited exceptions apply. Players may hold more than one non-FIFA nationality.

No.	Pos.	Nation	Player
—	GK	ENG	Leo Stretton
—	DF	ENG	Harry Jacklin
—	DF	WAL	Alfie Dignum
—	DF	ENG	Fabian Simons
—	DF	ENG	Rubens Nbatumbu
—	DF	ENG	Luqman Aideed
59	MF	ENG	Will Lawrence

No.	Pos.	Nation	Player
—	MF	ENG	Tinashe Manyumba
—	MF	ENG	Lyndon Turrell
—	MF	ENG	Seth Szembell
—	MF	ENG	James Quinn
—	MF	ENG	Olly Holmes
—	FW	ENG	Bismark Owusu
72	FW	THA	Jake Fletcher

== Staff ==
As of 29 October 2026

Academy Team Management
Role	Person
Academy Director	(England) Jon Rudkin
Academy Manager	(England) Ian Cawley
Head of Academy Coach Development	(England) Paul Cheney
Head of Education	(England) Matthew Clarke
Lead Coach Under-21s	(Republic of Ireland) Leon McSweeney
Lead Coach Under-18s	(England) Matt Rains
Lead Coach Under-16s	(England) Matt Goodwin
Academy Goalkeeper Coach	(England) Glyn Thompson
Academy Strength and Conditioning Coach	(England) Michael Cheverton
Head Academy Physiotherapist	(England) Ben Harwood
Head of Academy Sports Science	(England) Kevin Paxton
Academy Lead Sport Scientist	(England) Gary Capes
Academy Lead Performance Analyst	(England) Ryan DeFreitas
Academy Head Scout	(England) Bill Wall
Loans Manager	(Wales) Steve Morison

== Notable graduates ==
Current Leicester City players in bold. Year of senior debut given in parentheses.

- (England) Sep Smith (1929)
- (England) Don Revie (1945)
- (Scotland) Frank McLintock (1959)
- (England) Graham Cross (1961)
- (England) Peter Shilton (1966)
- (England) David Nish (1966)
- (England) Steve Whitworth (1970)
- (England) Gary Lineker (1979)
- (England) Emile Heskey (1995)
- (England) Richard Stearman (2004)
- (Republic of Ireland) Conrad Logan (2005 for Boston United)
- (Wales) Andy King (2007)
- (England) Joe Mattock (2007)
- (Ivory Coast) Max Gradel (2007 for Bournemouth)
- (Northern Ireland) Billy Mckay (2008 for Hinckley United)
- (England) Sam Clucas (2009 for Lincoln City)
- (Ghana) Jeffrey Schlupp (2011 for Brentford)
- (England) Liam Moore (2011 for Bradford City)
- (England) George Taft (2011 for Kettering Town)
- (England) Ben Chilwell (2015)
- (Bangladesh) Hamza Choudhury (2016 for Burton Albion)
- (England) Harvey Barnes (2016)
- (England) Elliott Moore (2017 for OH Leuven)
- (England) Josh Knight (2019 for Peterborough United)
- (England) Kiernan Dewsbury-Hall (2020)
- (England) **Luke Thomas** (2020)
- (Nigeria) Calvin Bassey (2020 for Rangers)
- (Thailand) Leon James (2020 for Ratchaburi Mitr Phol)
- (Portugal) Sidnei Tavares (2021)
- (South Africa) Khanya Leshabela (2021)
- (Republic of Ireland) Kasey McAteer (2021)
- (Portugal) Wanya Marçal (2022)
- (Poland) **Jakub Stolarczyk** (2022 for Dunfermline Athletic)
- (England) **Ben Nelson** (2022 for Rochdale)
- (England) **Will Alves** (2022)
- (England) **Sammy Braybrooke** (2022)
- (England) Jeremy Monga (2025)
- (England) **Jake Evans** (2025)
- (England) **Louis Page** (2025)

== Honours ==
=== U21 ===
- Premier League 2 Division 1
  - Runner-up: 2019–2020
- U21 Professional Development League 2 North Division
  - Winners (1): 2012–2013

=== Academy ===
- HKFC International Soccer Sevens
  - Shield Winners (1): 2011–2012
  - Cup Winners (2): 2012–2013, 2016–2017
  - Plate Winners (1): 2013–2014
- U15 Premier League Category 2 National Trophy
  - Winners (1): 2012–2013
- U16 Premier League Cup
  - Winners (1): 2023-2024
