= Aaron Ramsey (English footballer) =

English footballer (born 2003)

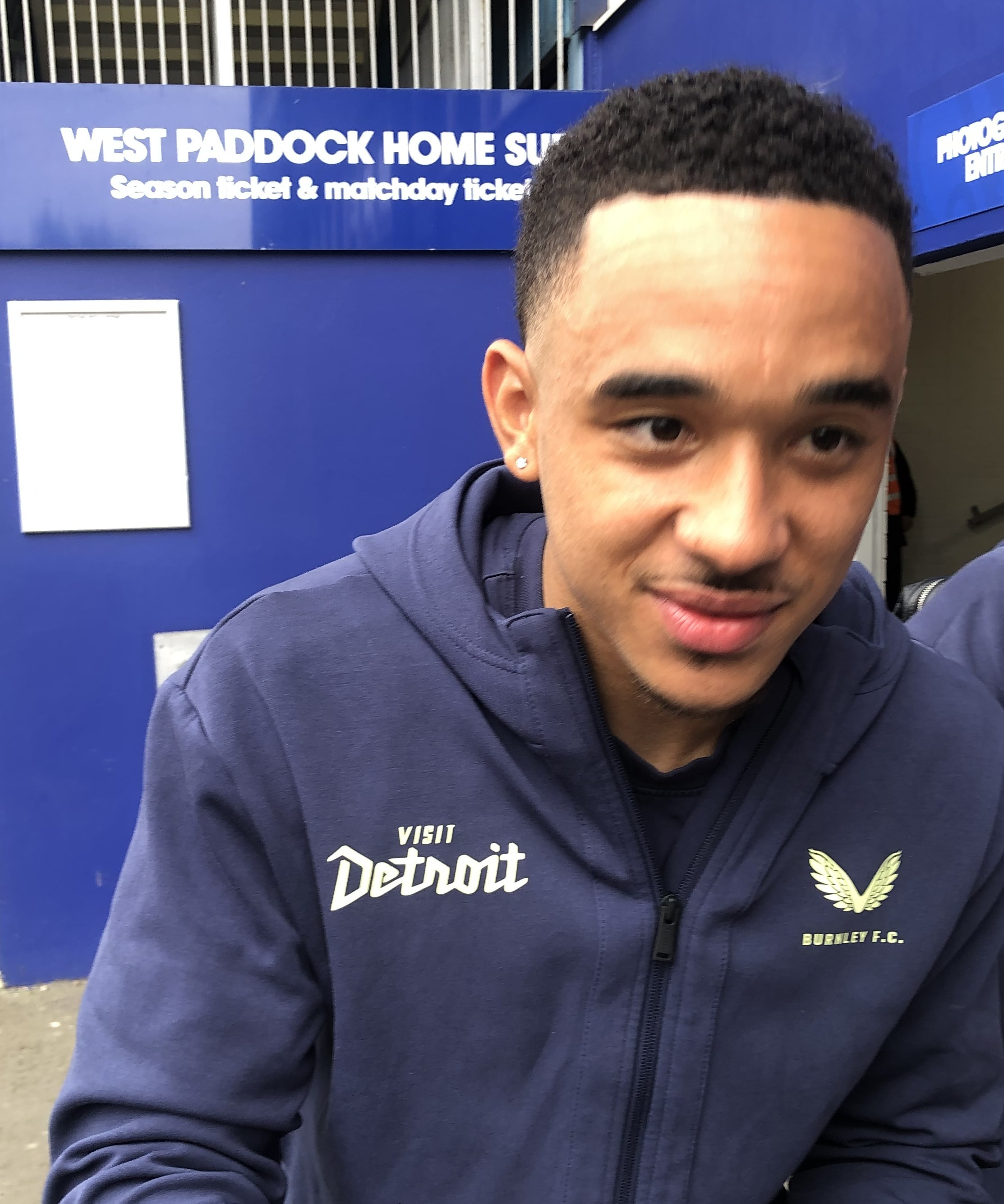
- Ramsey in 2025

Personal information
- Full name: Aaron James Ramsey
- Date of birth: 21 January 2003 (age 23)
- Place of birth: Great Barr, England
- Height: 1.80 m (5 ft 11 in)
- Position: Attacking midfielder

Team information
- Current team: Burnley
- Number: 21

Youth career
- –2021: Aston Villa

Senior career*
Years	Team	Apps	(Gls)
2021–2023	Aston Villa	0	(0)
2022	→ Cheltenham Town (loan)	15	(1)
2022–2023	→ Norwich City (loan)	18	(3)
2023	→ Middlesbrough (loan)	11	(5)
2023–	Burnley	25	(1)
2025–2026	→ Leicester City (loan)	9	(2)

International career^{‡}
2018–2019	England U16	5	(0)
2019–2020	England U17	9	(0)
2021	England U18	1	(0)
2020–2022	England U19	15	(3)
2022–2023	England U20	6	(1)
Medal record
Men's football
Representing England
UEFA European Under-19 Championship
Winner	2022 Slovakia
- * Club domestic league appearances and goals as of 09:44, 8 November 2026 (UTC) ‡ National team caps and goals as of 23:11, 29 March 2023 (UTC)

Aaron James Ramsey (born 21 January 2003) is an English professional footballer who plays as a winger or attacking midfielder for EFL Championship club Burnley. A product of the Aston Villa Academy, he has represented England at youth level up to under-20 level.

== Club career ==
=== Youth career ===
Ramsey joined Aston Villa alongside his brother Jacob at under-9 level. He moved through the youth ranks, and was given his first professional contract on 16 March 2021. During his time playing for the Aston Villa U23 side, Ramsey was named by The Guardian as one of England's top young talents. On 24 May 2021, Ramsey was part of the Aston Villa U18s team that won the FA Youth Cup, beating Liverpool 2–1 in the final.

=== Aston Villa ===
Ramsey was promoted to the first-team towards the end of the 2020–21 season, and played his first game with the senior team on 21 July 2021 – scoring in a pre-season friendly against Walsall. Ramsey made his first-team debut on 24 August 2021, in a 6–0 EFL Cup victory over Barrow.

On 11 January 2022, Ramsey joined League One club Cheltenham Town on loan until the end of the season. He made his EFL debut as a second-half substitute in a 1–0 defeat to Rotherham United on 22 January 2022. On 23 April 2022, Ramsey scored his first goal in senior football in a 2–1 home defeat for Cheltenham against Bolton Wanderers.

On 5 August 2022, Ramsey joined Championship club Norwich City on a season-long loan deal, linking up once again with former Villa manager Dean Smith. He made his debut on 9 August 2022, as a substitute in a 2–2 EFL Cup draw against Birmingham City. Norwich won the match on penalties, but Ramsey did not take part in the penalty shoot-out. He scored his first goals for the club on 29 October 2022 when he scored twice in a 3–1 win against Stoke City. In December 2022, Ramsey suffered a knee injury which required surgery. On 3 January 2023, Ramsey's loan deal with Norwich was terminated to allow him to continue his rehabilitation at Villa.

Following surgery and a month of rehabilitation, Ramsey moved to Middlesbrough on loan for the rest of the season on 31 January 2023. On 15 February, he made his debut for Middlesbrough in a Championship match against Sheffield United coming on as an 82nd minute substitute for Marcus Forss. Ramsey got his first goals for Middlesbrough on 4 March, scoring twice in a 5–0 victory over Reading.

=== Burnley ===
On 22 August 2023, Ramsey signed for fellow Premier League club Burnley, for a fee in the region of £14 million plus add-ons on a five-year deal. On 27 August he made his Premier League debut against his boyhood club Aston Villa at Turf Moor.

On 17 February 2024, during a Premier League match against Arsenal, Ramsey suffered what was described as a "very serious" knee injury - which left him being stretchered off the pitch requiring oxygen. Burnley manager Vincent Kompany advised after the match that he did know how long Ramsey would be out, but that the injury was "as bad as we thought." On 13 September 2024, Ramsey was able to join in with light training for the first time since his injury.

On 1 September 2025, Ramsey signed for Championship club Leicester City on a season-long loan.

== International career ==
Ramsey was born in England to a Jamaican father and English mother. He has been capped at England under-16, under-17 and under-18 level. He captained the Under-17 national team to a 2–1 victory over Germany on 14 November 2017. On 6 September 2021, after an injury to Harvey Elliott, Ramsey was called up to the England under-21 squad for the first time, ahead of their 2023 UEFA European Under-21 Championship qualification match against Kosovo. Ramsey was an unused substitute for the game.

On 6 October 2021, Ramsey made a goalscoring debut for the England U19s during a 3–1 defeat to France in Marbella.

On 17 June 2022, Ramsey was named in the England squad for the 2022 UEFA European Under-19 Championship finals. Ramsey featured heavily in the tournament, including on 1 July 2022, scoring the final goal in England's 3–1 extra time victory over Israel in the final.

On 21 September 2022, Ramsey made his England U20 debut during a 3–0 victory over Chile at the Pinatar Arena. He scored his first goal for the U20 team, on 27 September in a 3–0 victory over Australia.

== Personal life ==
Ramsey lives in Burnley. His older brother Jacob plays for Newcastle United, whilst his younger brother Cole is in the academy set-up at Tottenham Hotspur. His father Mark was a boxer who twice fought Ricky Hatton, once in 1998 and once in 1999.

== Career statistics ==
As of match played 7 November 2026

Appearances and goals by club, season and competition
Club	Season	League			FA Cup		EFL Cup		Other		Total	
Club	Season	Division	Apps	Goals	Apps	Goals	Apps	Goals	Apps	Goals	Apps	Goals
Aston Villa U21	2020–21	—			—		—		2 (Note: Appearance(s) in EFL Trophy)	0	2	0
Aston Villa U21	2021–22	—			—		—		1	1	1	1
Aston Villa U21	Total		—		—		—		3	1	3	1
Aston Villa	2021–22	Premier League	0	0	0	0	1	0	—		1	0
Cheltenham Town (loan)	2021–22	League One	15	1	—		—		—		15	1
Norwich City (loan)	2022–23	Championship	18	3	0	0	2	0	—		20	3
Middlesbrough (loan)	2022–23	Championship	11	5	—		—		0	0	11	5
Burnley	2023–24	Premier League	14	0	1	0	2	0	—		17	0
Burnley	2024–25	Championship	1	0	0	0	0	0	—		1	0
Burnley	2025–26	Premier League	0	0	—		1	1	—		1	1
Burnley	2026–27	Championship	10	1	0	0	1	0	—		11	1
Burnley	Total		25	1	1	0	4	1	—		30	2
Leicester City (loan)	2025–26	Championship	9	2	0	0	—		—		9	2
Career total			78	12	1	0	7	1	3	1	89	14

== Honours ==
Aston Villa U18

- FA Youth Cup: 2020–21

England U19

- UEFA European Under-19 Championship: 2022
