= Jeremy Monga =

English footballer (born 2009)

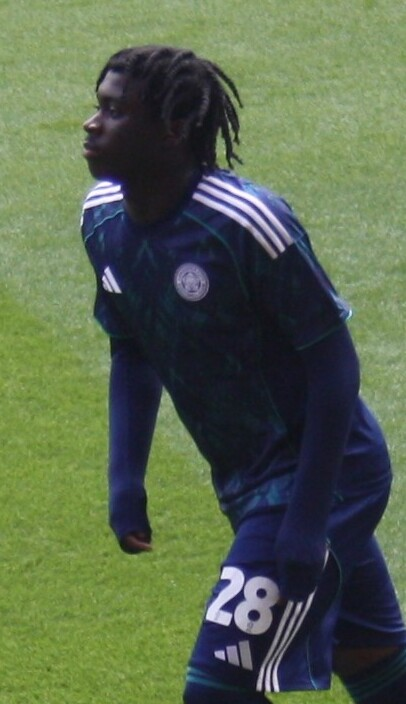
- Monga in 2025

Personal information
- Full name: Jeremy Ngola Monga
- Date of birth: 10 July 2009 (age 17)
- Place of birth: Coventry, England
- Position: Winger

Team information
- Current team: Swansea City (on loan from Manchester City)
- Number: 12

Youth career
- Coventry City
- 2017–2025: Leicester City

Senior career*
Years	Team	Apps	(Gls)
2025–2026	Leicester City	34	(1)
2026–	Manchester City	0	(0)
2026–	→ Swansea City (loan)	0	(0)

International career^{‡}
2024	England U15	4	(0)
2024–2025	England U16	9	(4)
2026–	England U18	5	(2)
2025–	England U19	7	(0)
- * Club domestic league appearances and goals as of 00:49, 29 May 2026 (UTC) ‡ National team caps and goals as of 14:34, 3 June 2026 (UTC)

Jeremy Ngola Monga (born 10 July 2009) is an English professional footballer who plays as a winger for EFL Championship club Swansea City, on loan from Premier League club Manchester City.

== Club career ==
=== Leicester City ===
Monga began his career with Coventry City, before joining the Leicester City Academy at age eight to play at the under-9 level. He became the youngest Premier League 2 scorer on 1 November 2024 after scoring against Aston Villa. After impressing for the under-21s, he began training with the first-team. However, manager Ruud van Nistelrooy stated opportunities for Monga would be limited, considering his school commitments. He was included in the match day squad for their FA Cup fourth round match against Manchester United on 7 February 2025 at the age of 15 years and 212 days.

He made his professional debut for Leicester on 7 April, aged 15 years and 271 days, coming on as a substitute for Bilal El Khannouss in the 74th minute of a 0–3 defeat to Newcastle United in the Premier League. In doing so, he became the second-youngest player, behind Ethan Nwaneri, to play in the Premier League. Monga had to play in a sponsorless shirt, to comply with UK laws on gambling advertising. Van Nistelrooy praised Monga on his debut, saying, "He showed glimpses of his quality at such a young age." He finished his debut season with seven Premier League appearances.

Following relegation, Monga signed a new scholarship contract with Leicester in June 2025. He is expected to sign professional terms with the club when he reaches age 17 in 2026. On 13 August 2025, Monga became the youngest player to start a match for Leicester City, starting and playing 60 minutes against Huddersfield Town in a 2–2 draw in the first round of the Carabao Cup. Three days later, Monga scored his first goal for the club in a 2–1 loss away to Preston North End, becoming the youngest goalscorer in Championship history at 16 years and 37 days old.

In summer 2026, he was linked with transfers to a number of Premier League clubs, including Arsenal, Brentford, and Manchester City.

=== Manchester City ===
On 11 July 2026, Monga signed for Premier League club Manchester City on a five-year deal, for a reported transfer fee of £10 million, with £2.5 million in potential add-ons.

==== Loan to Swansea City ====
On 2 September 2026, Monga joined EFL Championship club Swansea City until the end of the season.

== International career ==
Born in England, Monga is of Zambian descent. He represented England at under-15 and under-16 levels, captaining the latter.

Monga made his under-19 debut during a 2–0 win over Ukraine at Pinatar Arena on 3 September 2025.

On 25 March 2026, Monga made his under-U18 debut during a 4–1 2027 UEFA European Under-19 Championship qualification win over Bulgaria in Croatia.

== Personal life ==
During his time at Leicester City, Monga attended Ratcliffe College. He is a fan of Arsenal.

== Career statistics ==
As of match played 2 May 2026

Appearances and goals by club, season and competition
Club	Season	League			FA Cup		EFL Cup		Europe		Other		Total	
Club	Season	Division	Apps	Goals	Apps	Goals	Apps	Goals	Apps	Goals	Apps	Goals	Apps	Goals
Leicester City U21	2024–25	—			—		—		—		3 (Note: Appearances in EFL Trophy)	0	3	0
Leicester City	2024–25	Premier League	7	0	0	0	0	0	—		—		7	0
Leicester City	2025–26	Championship	27	1	2	0	1	0	—		—		30	1
Leicester City	Total		34	1	2	0	1	0	—		—		37	1
Manchester City	2026–27	Premier League	0	0	0	0	0	0	0	0	—		0	0
Swansea City (loan)	2026–27	Championship	0	0	0	0	—		—		—		0	0
Career total			34	1	2	0	1	0	0	0	3	0	40	1
