= Martí Cifuentes =

Spanish association football manager (born 1982)

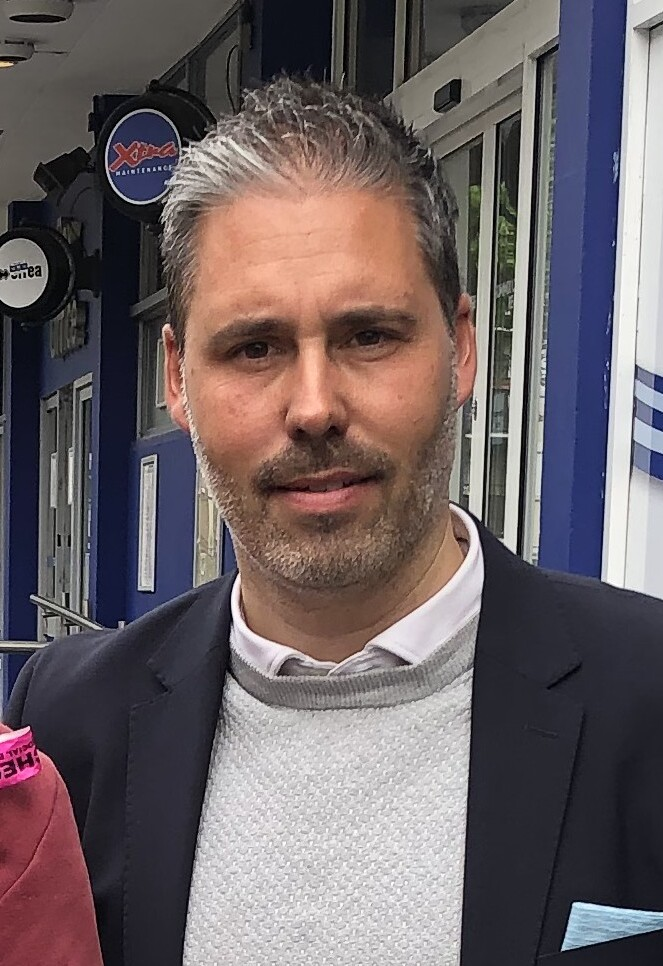
- Cifuentes in 2025 with Queens Park Rangers

Personal information
- Full name: Martí Cifuentes Corvillo
- Date of birth: 7 July 1982 (age 44)
- Place of birth: Sant Cugat del Vallès, Spain

Team information
- Current team: Portland Timbers (head coach)

Youth career
- Sant Cugat

Senior career*
Years	Team	Apps	(Gls)
- Mirasol-Baco
2009–2010	Sant Quirze		

Managerial career
- 2013–2014: Rubí
- 2014: Sant Andreu
- 2015–2016: Hospitalet
- 2018–2020: Sandefjord
- 2021–2022: AaB
- 2022–2023: Hammarby IF
- 2023–2025: Queens Park Rangers
- 2025–2026: Leicester City
- 2026–: Portland Timbers
- * Club domestic league appearances and goals

Martí Cifuentes Corvillo (born 7 July 1982) is a Spanish professional football manager who is the head coach of Major League Soccer club Portland Timbers.

== Early life ==
Born in Sant Cugat del Vallès, Barcelona, Catalonia, Cifuentes only played amateur football during his entire career. After being a Sant Cugat FC youth graduate, he represented CFU Mirasol-Baco and UE Sant Quirze Besora before focusing solely on managing; during an interview to La Vanguardia, he described himself as a "mediocre" player.

== Career ==
=== Early career ===
Cifuentes began his career with the youth sides of Sabadell before becoming an assistant of Manolo Fernández in the first team in 2006. He subsequently worked at Terrassa before having short spells in the youth departments of Ajax and Millwall between 2008 and 2009.

Cifuentes joined Rubí in 2010, as manager of the Juvenil squad, before being appointed manager of the first team in Tercera División on 29 May 2013. On 12 February 2014, he left the club to take over Segunda División B side Sant Andreu, replacing Patxi Salinas.

After managing to avoid relegation with the Quadribarrats, Cifuentes was confirmed as manager of the club for the 2014–15 season on 21 May 2014, but was dismissed in August. On 18 May 2015, he was named Hospitalet manager, with the club also in the third division.

Sacked by Hospi on 29 March 2016, Cifuentes moved to Sweden in April 2017, after being named in charge of AIK's reserve team and academy.

=== Sandefjord ===
On 31 May 2018, Cifuentes was announced as Sandefjord's new head coach on a contract that would keep him at the club until the end of the 2020 season. He took over mid-season a team that had gained only five points in their first twelve games in the 2018 season. The results improved during the rest of the season, but Sandefjord was relegated from Eliteserien on 11 November with one game to spare, although they lost only six of 18 games after Cifuentes took over.

In the following 2019 season, Cifuentes' first full season in charge, Sandefjord finished the 1. divisjon in second place and were promoted back to Eliteserien. In 2020, Sandefjord finished in eleventh place in the top tier, eight points clear of the relegation zone, the club's best result in eleven years.

=== AaB ===
On 28 December 2020, Cifuentes was announced as AaB's new head coach from 1 January 2021 on a contract that would keep him at the club till summer of 2023. He led the club in 37 Danish Superliga fixtures, averaging 1.51 points per game. When he left the club halfway through the 2021–22 campaign, AaB was placed fourth in the table after 17 rounds.

=== Hammarby IF ===
On 12 January 2022, Cifuentes was appointed as the new head coach of Hammarby IF. He signed a three-year deal with the Swedish club, after they had activated a release clause in his contract with AaB. The transfer officially came to effect on 24 January, after further negotiations between the two clubs regarding his notice period at AaB.

Cifuentes had a strong opening to the 2022 season, leading the side to five straight league wins, awarding him Allsvenskan Manager of the Month in April. The club also reached the final of the 2021–22 Svenska Cupen, but lost by 4–5 on penalties to Malmö after the game ended in a 0–0 draw. In August, Cifuentes won the award Allsvenskan Manager of the Month for the second time during the season. Eventually, Hammarby finished third in the table, thus qualifying for the 2023–24 UEFA Europa Conference League.

In 2023, Hammarby had a tough first half of the season, being placed eighth in the Allsvenskan table after 15 rounds. The side eventually picked up form and only lost one out of 12 league games between round 17 and 28. In the second qualifying round of the 2023–24 UEFA Europa Conference League, Hammarby lost 1–2 on aggregate, after extra time, to Dutch Eredivisie club Twente. On 30 October 2023, with two fixtures left of the season, he left the club with immediate effect, after Hammarby had reached an agreement with Queens Park Rangers for his transfer.

=== Queens Park Rangers ===
On 30 October 2023, it was announced that Cifuentes had been appointed the new head coach of EFL Championship side Queens Park Rangers. On 26 April 2024, his QPR side kept their Championship status after a 4–0 win against Leeds United, which ultimately sealed Leicester City's promotion to the Premier League after a year's absence from the top-flight.

In April 2025, it was reported that Cifuentes' representatives had been in contact with fellow Championship side West Bromwich Albion over the vacant manager's job there. On 29 April 2025, Queens Park Rangers announced that they had put Cifuentes on gardening leave ahead of the final match of the 2024–25 season. The following day however, it was reported that he was not on West Bromwich Albion's shortlist to become head coach.

On 24 June 2025, the club announced Cifuentes had left the club by mutual consent.

=== Leicester City ===
On 15 July 2025, it was announced that Cifuentes had been appointed the new manager of EFL Championship side Leicester City on a three-year contract.

On 25 January 2026, following a 1–2 home defeat to Oxford United the day prior, Cifuentes was sacked by Leicester City following a poor position in the league, which saw them sit in 14th in the table.

=== Portland Timbers ===
On 21 July 2026, Cifuentes was announced as the new head coach of Major League Soccer club Portland Timbers, subject to approval of the visa process. He officially took over as head coach on 11 August.

== Managerial statistics ==
As of match played 21 November 2026

Managerial record by team and tenure
Team	From	To	Record				
Team	From	To	P	W	D	L	Win %
Rubí	1 July 2013	12 February 2014	24	14	4	6	58.33
Sant Andreu	12 February 2014	10 July 2014	13	5	2	6	38.46
L'Hospitalet	18 May 2015	29 March 2016	31	9	7	15	29.03
Sandefjord	31 May 2018	28 December 2020	81	33	26	22	40.74
AaB	1 January 2021	12 January 2022	40	17	11	12	42.50
Hammarby IF	12 January 2022	30 October 2023	74	38	20	16	51.35
Queens Park Rangers	30 October 2023	24 June 2025	83	28	24	31	33.73
Leicester City	15 July 2025	25 January 2026	31	11	9	11	35.48
Portland Timbers	11 August 2026	Present	18	7	4	7	38.89
Total			395	162	107	126	41.01
