= Kevon Gray =

English footballer (born 2007)

Personal information
- Full name: Kevon Olando Gray
- Date of birth: 6 October 2006 (age 20)
- Place of birth: London, England
- Position: Defender

Team information
- Current team: Leicester City
- Number: 62

Youth career
- –2026: Leicester City

Senior career*
| Years | Team | Apps | (Gls) |
| 2026– | Leicester City | 1 | (0) |
- * Club domestic league appearances and goals as of 12:39, 11 May 2026 (UTC)

Kevon Olando Gray (born 6 October 2006) is an English professional footballer who plays as a defender for EFL League One club Leicester City.

== Career ==
Gray is a product of the Leicester City academy, which he joined at under-9 level. He was named as one of the Premier League’s Inspirational Scholars in 2024/25, a nod to his on-field displays and academic commitments. On 12 March 2026, he signed a new professional contract with the club until 2029.

On 2 May 2026, Gray made his professional debut for Leicester in a 1–0 victory over Blackburn Rovers in the EFL Championship, coming on as an 88th-minute substitute for Harry Souttar.
