= 2022–23 Leicester City F.C. season =

Leicester City
2022–23 season
- Owner: King Power
- Chairman: Aiyawatt Srivaddhanaprabha
- Manager: Brendan Rodgers (until 2 April); Mike Stowell and Adam Sadler (caretaker, from 2–10 April); Dean Smith (interim, from 10 April)
- Stadium: King Power Stadium
- Premier League: 18th (relegated)
- FA Cup: Fifth round
- EFL Cup: Quarter-finals
- Top goalscorer: League: Harvey Barnes (13); All: Harvey Barnes (13)
- Highest home attendance: 32,226 vs Manchester United (1 September 2022, Premier League)
- Lowest home attendance: League: 30,813 vs Fulham (3 January 2023, Premier League); All: 15,081 vs Newport County (8 November 2022, EFL Cup)
| Home colours | Away colours | Third colours |

The 2022–23 season was the 118th season in the existence of Leicester City Football Club, and their 55th (non-consecutive) season in the top tier of English football. This was their ninth consecutive season in the Premier League. In addition to the domestic league, they also competed in the season's editions of the FA Cup and the EFL Cup.

This was Leicester's first season since 2010–11 to not feature Kasper Schmeichel, who departed to Nice in the summer.

Leicester City made a poor start to their season, as they only picked up one point in their first seven league matches, and sat at the bottom of the table. At the eighth attempt, they achieved their first win of the season, after beating local rivals Nottingham Forest 4–0. The club went on to have a terrific run-in, until going back to losing ways with a 3–0 defeat to Manchester United. On 2 April 2023, having gone six matches without a win, head coach Brendan Rodgers was sacked after four years in charge. A week later, Dean Smith took temporary charge until the end of the season. Despite their final day win over West Ham United, Leicester were officially demoted to the Championship for the fourth time in their history following Everton's victory against Bournemouth. This made Leicester the second former champions in the Premier League era to be relegated, after Blackburn Rovers.

== Management team ==
The management team from the start of the season until 2 April 2023.

| Position | Name |
|---|---|
| Manager | (Northern Ireland) Brendan Rodgers |
| Assistant manager | (Wales) Chris Davies |
| First team coaches | (Ivory Coast) Kolo Touré (until 29 November 2022) |
| First team coaches | (England) Adam Sadler |
| First team coach & Goalkeeper coach | (England) Mike Stowell |
| First team set-piece coach | (Denmark) Lars Knudsen (from 29 August 2022) |

Management team from 10 April 2023.

| Position | Name |
|---|---|
| Manager | (England) Dean Smith |
| Assistant managers | (England) Craig Shakespeare |
| Assistant managers | (England) John Terry |
| First team coach | (England) Adam Sadler |
| First team coach & Goalkeeper coach | (England) Mike Stowell |
| First team set-piece coach | (Denmark) Lars Knudsen |

== Kits ==
| Home | Home 2023–24 | Away | Third |

| Goalkeeper 1 | Goalkeeper 2 | Goalkeeper 3 | Goalkeeper 2023–24 |

== Players ==
=== Squad information ===
Players and squad numbers as of 28 May 2023. Appearances include all competitions.
Note: Flags indicate national team as has been defined under FIFA eligibility rules. Players may hold more than one non-FIFA nationality.

| No. | Player | Nat. | Position(s) | Date of birth (age) | Signed in | Contract ends | Signed from | Apps | Goals |
Goalkeepers
| 1 | Danny Ward | (Wales) | GK | 22 June 1993 (aged 30) | 2018 | 2025 | (England) Liverpool | 47 | 0 |
| 12 | Alex Smithies | (England) | GK | 5 March 1990 (aged 33) | 2022 | 2024 | (Wales) Cardiff City | 0 | 0 |
| 31 | Daniel Iversen | (Denmark) | GK | 19 January 1997 (aged 26) | 2018 | 2025 | Youth Academy | 17 | 0 |
| 41 | Jakub Stolarczyk | (Poland) | GK | 19 December 2000 (aged 22) | 2019 | 2026 | Youth Academy | 0 | 0 |
Defenders
| 2 | James Justin | (England) | LB / LWB / RB / RWB / CB | 23 February 1998 (aged 25) | 2019 | 2026 | (England) Luton Town | 83 | 5 |
| 3 | Wout Faes | (Belgium) | CB | 3 April 1998 (aged 25) | 2022 | 2027 | (France) Reims | 36 | 1 |
| 4 | Çağlar Söyüncü | (Turkey) | CB | 23 May 1996 (aged 27) | 2018 | 2023 | (Germany) SC Freiburg | 132 | 4 |
| 5 | Ryan Bertrand | (England) | LB | 5 August 1989 (aged 33) | 2021 | 2023 | (England) Southampton | 11 | 0 |
| 6 | Jonny Evans | (Northern Ireland) | CB | 3 January 1988 (aged 35) | 2018 | 2023 | (England) West Bromwich Albion | 152 | 7 |
| 15 | Harry Souttar | (Australia) | CB | 22 October 1998 (aged 24) | 2023 | 2028 | (England) Stoke City | 12 | 0 |
| 16 | Victor Kristiansen | (Denmark) | LB | 16 December 2002 (aged 20) | 2023 | 2028 | (Denmark) Copenhagen | 14 | 0 |
| 18 | Daniel Amartey | (Ghana) | RB / CB | 21 December 1994 (aged 28) | 2016 | 2022 | (Denmark) Copenhagen | 145 | 3 |
| 21 | Ricardo Pereira | (Portugal) | RB / RWB | 6 October 1993 (aged 29) | 2018 | 2026 | (Portugal) Porto | 124 | 9 |
| 23 | Jannik Vestergaard | (Denmark) | CB | 3 August 1992 (aged 30) | 2021 | 2024 | (England) Southampton | 23 | 0 |
| 27 | Timothy Castagne | (Belgium) | RB / LB / RWB / LWB / CB | 5 December 1995 (aged 27) | 2020 | 2025 | (Italy) Atalanta | 112 | 5 |
| 33 | Luke Thomas | (England) | LWB / LB | 10 June 2001 (aged 22) | 2020 | 2024 | Youth Academy | 86 | 2 |
| 34 | Lewis Brunt | (England) | CB | 6 November 2000 (aged 22) | 2021 | 2025 | (England) Aston Villa | 4 | 0 |
Midfielders
| 7 | Harvey Barnes | (England) | LW | 9 December 1997 (aged 25) | 2016 | 2025 | Youth Academy | 187 | 44 |
| 8 | Youri Tielemans | (Belgium) | CM | 7 May 1997 (aged 26) | 2019 | 2023 | (France) Monaco | 195 | 28 |
| 10 | James Maddison | (England) | AM | 23 November 1996 (aged 26) | 2018 | 2024 | (England) Norwich City | 203 | 55 |
| 11 | Marc Albrighton | (England) | RW / LW / RWB / LWB | 18 November 1989 (aged 33) | 2015 | 2024 | (England) Aston Villa | 295 | 19 |
| 22 | Kiernan Dewsbury-Hall | (England) | CM | 6 September 1998 (aged 24) | 2017 | 2027 | Youth Academy | 80 | 5 |
| 24 | Nampalys Mendy | (Senegal) | DM | 23 June 1992 (aged 31) | 2016 | 2023 | (France) Nice | 118 | 1 |
| 25 | Wilfred Ndidi | (Nigeria) | DM | 16 December 1996 (aged 26) | 2017 | 2024 | (Belgium) Genk | 237 | 11 |
| 26 | Dennis Praet | (Belgium) | CM | 14 May 1994 (aged 29) | 2019 | 2023 | (Italy) Sampdoria | 90 | 4 |
| 29 | Hamza Choudhury | (England) | DM | 1 October 1997 (aged 25) | 2015 | 2023 | Youth Academy | 84 | 2 |
| 42 | Boubakary Soumaré | (France) | DM | 27 February 1999 (aged 24) | 2021 | 2026 | (France) Lille | 60 | 0 |
| 44 | Sammy Braybrooke | (England) | CM | 12 March 2004 (aged 19) | 2022 | 2026 | Youth Academy | 1 | 0 |
| 47 | Kasey McAteer | (England) | CM | 22 November 2001 (aged 21) | 2021 | 2025 | Youth Academy | 4 | 0 |
| 57 | Will Alves | (England) | AM | 4 May 2005 (aged 18) | 2022 | | Youth Academy | 2 | 0 |
Attackers
| 9 | Jamie Vardy | (England) | ST | 11 January 1987 (aged 36) | 2012 | 2024 | (England) Fleetwood Town | 426 | 170 |
| 14 | Kelechi Iheanacho | (Nigeria) | ST | 3 October 1996 (aged 26) | 2017 | 2024 | (England) Manchester City | 206 | 56 |
| 17 | Ayoze Pérez | (Spain) | SS / RW / AM | 29 July 1993 (aged 29) | 2019 | 2023 | (England) Newcastle United | 114 | 15 |
| 20 | Patson Daka | (Zambia) | ST | 9 October 1998 (aged 24) | 2021 | 2026 | (Austria) Red Bull Salzburg | 74 | 15 |
| 37 | Tetê (on loan) | (Brazil) | RW | 15 February 2000 (aged 23) | 2023 | 2023 | (Ukraine) Shakhtar Donetsk | 14 | 1 |

== Transfers ==
=== In ===
| Date | Position | Nationality | Player | From | Fee | Team | Ref. |
|---|---|---|---|---|---|---|---|
| 12 August 2022 | GK | (England) | Alex Smithies | (Wales) Cardiff City | Free Transfer | First team | |
| 1 September 2022 | CB | (Belgium) | Wout Faes | (France) Reims | £15,000,000 | First team | |
| 20 January 2023 | LB | (Denmark) | Victor Kristiansen | (Denmark) Copenhagen | £17,000,000 | First team | |
| 30 January 2023 | FW | (Ghana) | Nathan Opoku | (United States) Syracuse University | Undisclosed | Under-23s | |
| 31 January 2023 | CB | (Australia) | Harry Souttar | (England) Stoke City | £15,000,000 | First team | |

=== Out ===
| Date | Position | Nationality | Player | To | Fee | Team | Ref. |
|---|---|---|---|---|---|---|---|
| 30 June 2022 | RB | (England) | Vontae Daley-Campbell | (Wales) Cardiff City | Released | Under-23s | |
| 30 June 2022 | DM | (England) | Callum Hulme | (England) Wythenshawe Town | Released | Under-23s | |
| 30 June 2022 | GK | (Switzerland) | Eldin Jakupović | (England) Everton | Released | First team | |
| 30 June 2022 | CF | (Wales) | Will Russ | (England) Fleetwood Town | Released | Under-23s | |
| 30 June 2022 | RW | (Saint Kitts and Nevis) | Tyrese Shade | (England) Swindon Town | Released | Under-23s | |
| 30 June 2022 | CF | (England) | Jacob Wakeling | (England) Swindon Town | Released | Under-23s | |
| 20 July 2022 | CF | (England) | Jack Butterfill | (England) Barnsley | Free transfer | Under-23s | |
| 3 August 2022 | GK | (Denmark) | Kasper Schmeichel | (France) Nice | Undisclosed | First team | |
| 31 August 2022 | CB | (France) | Wesley Fofana | (England) Chelsea | £70,000,000 | First team | |
| 1 September 2022 | CM | (England) | Callum Wright | (England) Blackpool | Undisclosed | Under-23s | |

=== Loans in ===
| Date | Position | Nationality | Player | From | Date until | Ref. |
|---|---|---|---|---|---|---|
| 29 January 2023 | RW | (Brazil) | Tetê | (Ukraine) Shakhtar Donetsk | End of season | |

=== Loans out ===
| Date | Position | Nationality | Player | To | Date until | Team | Ref. |
|---|---|---|---|---|---|---|---|
| 26 July 2022 | CM | (South Africa) | Khanya Leshabela | (England) Crewe Alexandra | 31 January 2023 | Under-23s | |
| 28 July 2022 | CB | (England) | Ben Nelson | (England) Rochdale | 6 January 2023 (Note: On 6 January, Nelson's loan at Rochdale was cut short.) | Under-23s | |
| 10 August 2022 | CM | (England) | Hamza Choudhury | (England) Watford | End of season | First team | |
| 15 August 2022 | GK | (Poland) | Jakub Stolarczyk | (England) Fleetwood Town | 13 January 2023 (Note: On 13 January, Stolarczyk was recalled from his loan at Fleetwood.) | First team | |
| 19 August 2022 | CF | (Belgium) | Josh Eppiah | (England) Northampton Town | End of season | Under-23s | |
| 26 August 2022 | GK | (England) | Brad Young | (England) Notts County | 6 January 2023 (Note: On 6 January, Young returned from loan due to injury.) | Under-23s | |
| 31 August 2022 | CF | (England) | George Hirst | (England) Blackburn Rovers | 8 January 2023 (Note: On 8 January, Hirst was recalled back from his loan at Blackburn, and joined Ipswich on loan.) | Under-23s | |
| 8 January 2023 | CF | (England) | George Hirst | (England) Ipswich Town | End of season | Under-23s | |
| 17 January 2023 | CB | (England) | Ben Nelson | (England) Doncaster Rovers | End of season | Under-23s | |
| 23 January 2023 | GK | (Poland) | Jakub Stolarczyk | (England) Hartlepool United | End of season | First team | |
| 31 January 2023 | CF | (Ghana) | Nathan Opoku | (Belgium) OH Leuven | End of season | Under-23s | |
| 31 January 2023 | SS | (Spain) | Ayoze Pérez | (Spain) Real Betis | End of season | First team | |
| 31 January 2023 | RM | (England) | Marc Albrighton | (England) West Bromwich Albion | End of season | First team | |
| 31 January 2023 | AM | (England) | Kasey McAteer | (England) AFC Wimbledon | End of season | Under-23s | |

== Pre-season and friendlies ==
On 5 June, Leicester City announced their first pre-season friendly, in Belgium against Oud-Heverlee Leuven. Ten days later, a trip to Preston North End was also confirmed, along with a behind-closed-doors meeting with Notts County. On 16 June, a home friendly match against Sevilla was revealed. A fifth friendly, away to Derby County was also confirmed as part of the clubs preparations for the new season. The schedule was completed with the addition of Hull City away.

Win Draw Loss Fixtures

| 9 July 2022 Friendly | Leicester City | 1–2 | Notts County | Sileby |
| 13:00 BST | Barnes 31' | Report | Mitchell 41'; Baldwin 78' | Stadium: Leicester City Training Ground; Attendance: 0 (behind closed doors); Referee: John Brooks |

| 16 July 2022 Friendly | OH Leuven | 3–3 | Leicester City | Leuven, Belgium |
| 14:00 CEST | Al-Taamari 1'; Nsingi 12'; Malinov (yellow card) 58'; Kukharevych 91' | Report | Dewsbury-Hall 51'; Daka 59'; Vardy 101' | Stadium: Den Dreef; Referee: Matonga Simonini |
Note: Match was played in three periods of 40 minutes each.

| 20 July 2022 Corendon Cup | Hull City | 0–4 | Leicester City | Kingston upon Hull |
| 19:45 BST | | Report | Daka 29'; Barnes 47'; Fofana 51'; Maddison 84' | Stadium: MKM Stadium; Referee: Seb Stockbridge |

| 23 July 2022 Friendly | Derby County | 1–3 | Leicester City | Derby |
| 13:00 BST | Barkhuizen 65' | Report | Iheanacho 55'; Daka 79'; Wright 86' | Stadium: Pride Park Stadium; Attendance: 9,805 |

| 23 July 2022 Friendly | Preston North End | 1–2 | Leicester City | Preston |
| 15:00 BST | Ledson (yellow card) 16'; McCann 49'; Storey (yellow card) 59'; Whiteman (yellow card) 70'; Evans (yellow card) 82' | Report | Vardy 12'; Barnes 18'; Fofana (yellow card) 80' | Stadium: Deepdale; Attendance: 4,553; Referee: Jarred Gillett |

| 31 July 2022 Friendly | Leicester City | 1–0 | Sevilla | Leicester |
| 18:00 BST | Dewsbury-Hall 68' | Report | Montiel (yellow card) 51'; Munir (yellow card) 65'; Jordán (yellow card) 74'; Salas (yellow card) 82' | Stadium: King Power Stadium; Referee: Stuart Attwell (England) |

== Competitions ==
=== Overall record ===
| Competition | First match | Last match | Starting round | Final position | Record | | | | | | | |
| Competition | First match | Last match | Starting round | Final position | Pld | W | D | L | GF | GA | GD | Win % |
|---|---|---|---|---|---|---|---|---|---|---|---|---|
| Premier League | 7 August 2022 | 28 May 2023 | Matchday 1 | 18th | 38 | 9 | 7 | 22 | 51 | 68 | −17 | 23.68 |
| FA Cup | 7 January 2023 | 28 February 2023 | Third round | Fifth round | 3 | 2 | 0 | 1 | 3 | 2 | +1 | 66.67 |
| EFL Cup | 23 August 2022 | 10 January 2023 | Second round | Quarter-finals | 4 | 2 | 1 | 1 | 6 | 2 | +4 | 50.00 |
| Total | | | | | 45 | 13 | 8 | 24 | 60 | 72 | −12 | 28.89 |

Source: Soccerway

=== Premier League ===
==== League table ====
| Pos | Team | Pld | W | D | L | GF | GA | GD | Pts | Qualification or relegation |
|---|---|---|---|---|---|---|---|---|---|---|
| 1 | Manchester City (C) | 38 | 28 | 5 | 5 | 94 | 33 | +61 | 89 | Qualification to Champions League group stage |
| 2 | Arsenal | 38 | 26 | 6 | 6 | 88 | 43 | +45 | 84 | Qualification to Champions League group stage |
| 3 | Manchester United | 38 | 23 | 6 | 9 | 58 | 43 | +15 | 75 | Qualification to Champions League group stage |
| 4 | Newcastle United | 38 | 19 | 14 | 5 | 68 | 33 | +35 | 71 | Qualification to Champions League group stage |
| 5 | Liverpool | 38 | 19 | 10 | 9 | 75 | 47 | +28 | 67 | Qualification to Europa League group stage (Note: Since the winners of the 2022–23 FA Cup, Manchester City, qualified for the Champions League, the spot given to the FA Cup winners (Europa League group stage) was passed to the sixth-placed team.) |
| 6 | Brighton & Hove Albion | 38 | 18 | 8 | 12 | 72 | 53 | +19 | 62 | Qualification to Europa League group stage |
| 7 | Aston Villa | 38 | 18 | 7 | 13 | 51 | 46 | +5 | 61 | Qualification to Europa Conference League play-off round (Note: Since the winners of the 2022–23 EFL Cup, Manchester United, qualified for the Champions League, the spot given to the League Cup winners (Europa Conference League play-off round) was passed to the seventh-placed team.) |
| 8 | Tottenham Hotspur | 38 | 18 | 6 | 14 | 70 | 63 | +7 | 60 | |
| 9 | Brentford | 38 | 15 | 14 | 9 | 58 | 46 | +12 | 59 | |
| 10 | Fulham | 38 | 15 | 7 | 16 | 55 | 53 | +2 | 52 | |
| 11 | Crystal Palace | 38 | 11 | 12 | 15 | 40 | 49 | −9 | 45 | |
| 12 | Chelsea | 38 | 11 | 11 | 16 | 38 | 47 | −9 | 44 | |
| 13 | Wolverhampton Wanderers | 38 | 11 | 8 | 19 | 31 | 58 | −27 | 41 | |
| 14 | West Ham United | 38 | 11 | 7 | 20 | 42 | 55 | −13 | 40 | Qualification to Europa League group stage (Note: West Ham United qualified for the Europa League group stage by winning the 2022–23 UEFA Europa Conference League.) |
| 15 | Bournemouth | 38 | 11 | 6 | 21 | 37 | 71 | −34 | 39 | |
| 16 | Nottingham Forest | 38 | 9 | 11 | 18 | 38 | 68 | −30 | 38 | |
| 17 | Everton | 38 | 8 | 12 | 18 | 34 | 57 | −23 | 36 | |
| 18 | Leicester City (R) | 38 | 9 | 7 | 22 | 51 | 68 | −17 | 34 | Relegation to EFL Championship |
| 19 | Leeds United (R) | 38 | 7 | 10 | 21 | 48 | 78 | −30 | 31 | Relegation to EFL Championship |
| 20 | Southampton (R) | 38 | 6 | 7 | 25 | 36 | 73 | −37 | 25 | Relegation to EFL Championship |

Source: Premier League
Rules for classification: 1) Points; 2) Goal difference; 3) Goals scored; 4) If the champions, relegated teams or qualified teams for UEFA competitions cannot be determined by rules 1 to 3, rules 4.1 to 4.3 are applied – 4.1) Points gained in head-to-head record between such teams; 4.2) Away goals scored in head-to-head record between such teams; 4.3) Play-offs
(C) Champions; (R) Relegated

==== Results summary ====
| Overall | | | | | | | | Home | | | | | | Away | | | | | |
| Pld | W | D | L | GF | GA | GD | Pts | W | D | L | GF | GA | GD | W | D | L | GF | GA | GD |
|---|---|---|---|---|---|---|---|---|---|---|---|---|---|---|---|---|---|---|---|
| 38 | 9 | 7 | 22 | 51 | 68 | −17 | 34 | 5 | 4 | 10 | 23 | 27 | −4 | 4 | 3 | 12 | 28 | 41 | −13 |

Source: Premier League

==== Results by round ====
| Round | 1 | 2 | 3 | 4 | 5 | 6 | 7 | 8 | 9 | 10 | 11 | 12 | 13 | 14 | 15 | 16 | 17 | 18 | 19 | 20 | 21 | 22 | 23 | 24 | 25 | 26 | 27 | 28 | 29 | 30 | 31 | 32 | 33 | 34 | 35 | 36 | 37 | 38 |
|---|---|---|---|---|---|---|---|---|---|---|---|---|---|---|---|---|---|---|---|---|---|---|---|---|---|---|---|---|---|---|---|---|---|---|---|---|---|---|
| Ground | H | A | H | A | A | H | A | H | A | H | H | A | H | A | A | H | A | H | A | H | A | H | A | H | A | H | A | A | H | H | A | H | A | H | A | H | A | H |
| Result | D | L | L | L | L | L | L | W | L | D | W | W | L | W | W | L | L | L | L | D | W | W | L | L | L | L | D | L | L | L | L | W | D | D | L | L | D | W |
| Position | 11 | 15 | 19 | 20 | 20 | 20 | 20 | 19 | 20 | 19 | 19 | 17 | 18 | 14 | 13 | 13 | 13 | 13 | 15 | 14 | 14 | 13 | 14 | 14 | 15 | 16 | 17 | 19 | 19 | 19 | 19 | 17 | 18 | 16 | 18 | 19 | 18 | 18 |

Source: Premier League
A = Away; H = Home; W = Win; D = Draw; L = Loss; P = Postponed

==== Matches ====
Win Draw Loss Fixtures

On 16 June, the Premier League fixtures were released.

| 7 August 2022 1 | Leicester City | 2–2 | Brentford | Leicester |
| 14:00 BST | Castagne 33'; Dewsbury-Hall 46' | Report | Toney 62'; Dasilva 86' | Stadium: King Power Stadium; Attendance: 31,794; Referee: Jarred Gillett |

| 13 August 2022 2 | Arsenal | 4–2 | Leicester City | Holloway |
| 15:00 BST | Gabriel Jesus 23', 35'; Xhaka 55'; Martinelli 75'; Tomiyasu (yellow card) 90' | Report | Fofana (yellow card) 16'; Saliba 53' (o.g.); Maddison 74' | Stadium: Emirates Stadium; Attendance: 60,033; Referee: Darren England |

| 20 August 2022 3 | Leicester City | 1–2 | Southampton | Leicester |
| 15:00 BST | Maddison 54', (yellow card) 90+4'; Daka (yellow card) 76' | Report | Elyounoussi (yellow card) 64'; Adams 68', 84'; Aribo (yellow card) 82'; Lavia (yellow card) 90+4' | Stadium: King Power Stadium; Attendance: 30,850; Referee: Michael Salisbury |

| 27 August 2022 4 | Chelsea | 2–1 | Leicester City | Fulham |
| 15:00 BST | Gallagher (yellow card) 22' (yellow-red card) 28'; Sterling 47', 63'; Havertz (yellow card) 90+3' | Report | Dewsbury-Hall (yellow card) 31'; Praet (yellow card) 40'; Barnes 66' | Stadium: Stamford Bridge; Attendance: 39,953; Referee: Paul Tierney |

| 1 September 2022 5 | Leicester City | 0–1 | Manchester United | Leicester |
| 20:00 BST | Vardy (yellow card) 87' | Report | Sancho 23'; Dalot (yellow card) 28'; Malacia (yellow card) 43'; Martínez (yellow card) 49' | Stadium: King Power Stadium; Attendance: 32,226; Referee: Craig Pawson |

| 4 September 2022 6 | Brighton & Hove Albion | 5–2 | Leicester City | Falmer |
| 14:00 BST | Thomas 10' (o.g.); Mac Allister (yellow card) 12', (goal) 71' (pen.), 90+7'; Caicedo 15'; Trossard 64' | Report | Iheanacho 1'; Thomas (yellow card) 3'; Daka 33' | Stadium: Falmer Stadium; Attendance: 31,185; Referee: Tony Harrington |

| 17 September 2022 7 | Tottenham Hotspur | 6–2 | Leicester City | Tottenham |
| 17:30 BST | Kane 8'; Dier 21'; Bentancur 47'; Son 73', 84', 86'; Perišić (yellow card) 73' | Report | Tielemans 6' (pen.); Maddison 41'; Ndidi (yellow card) 49'; Daka (yellow card) 61' | Stadium: Tottenham Hotspur Stadium; Attendance: 61,450; Referee: Simon Hooper |

| 3 October 2022 8 | Leicester City | 4–0 | Nottingham Forest | Leicester |
| 20:00 BST | Maddison 25', 35', (yellow card) 83'; Barnes 27'; Soumaré (yellow card) 71'; Daka 73' | Report | Williams (yellow card) 18'; Kouyaté (yellow card) 33'; Lingard (yellow card) 64'; Cook (yellow card) 90+2' | Stadium: King Power Stadium; Attendance: 32,202; Referee: Robert Jones |

| 8 October 2022 9 | Bournemouth | 2–1 | Leicester City | Bournemouth |
| 15:00 BST | Fredericks (yellow card) 40'; Billing 67'; Christie 71' | Report | Daka 10'; Soumaré (yellow card) 59'; Maddison (yellow card) 88' | Stadium: Vitality Stadium; Attendance: 10,272; Referee: Michael Salisbury |

| 15 October 2022 10 | Leicester City | 0–0 | Crystal Palace | Leicester |
| 12:30 BST | Vardy (yellow card) 81'; Maddison (yellow card) 90+4' | Report | Andersen (yellow card) 11'; Doucouré (yellow card) 45+1' | Stadium: King Power Stadium; Attendance: 31,298; Referee: Andrew Madley |

| 20 October 2022 11 | Leicester City | 2–0 | Leeds United | Leicester |
| 20:15 BST | Koch 16' (o.g.); Barnes 35'; Soumaré (yellow card) 52'; Tielemans (yellow card) 78' | Report | Koch (yellow card) 43' | Stadium: King Power Stadium; Attendance: 30,814; Referee: Peter Bankes |

| 23 October 2022 12 | Wolverhampton Wanderers | 0–4 | Leicester City | Wolverhampton |
| 14:00 BST | Jonny (yellow card) 7'; Semedo (yellow card) 85' | Report | Tielemans 8'; Barnes 19'; Maddison 65'; Vardy 79'; Faes (yellow card) 90+3' | Stadium: Molineux Stadium; Attendance: 31,483; Referee: Michael Oliver |

| 29 October 2022 13 | Leicester City | 0–1 | Manchester City | Leicester |
| 12:30 BST | | Report | De Bruyne 49' | Stadium: King Power Stadium; Attendance: 32,223; Referee: Robert Jones |

| 5 November 2022 14 | Everton | 0–2 | Leicester City | Liverpool |
| 17:30 GMT | | Report | Tielemans 45'; Barnes 86' | Stadium: Goodison Park; Attendance: 39,206; Referee: David Coote |

| 12 November 2022 15 | West Ham United | 0–2 | Leicester City | Stratford |
| 15:00 GMT | Dawson (yellow card) 41'; Paquetá (yellow card) 60'; Scamacca (yellow card) 85' | Report | Maddison 8'; Ndidi (yellow card) 62'; Barnes 78' | Stadium: London Stadium; Attendance: 62,459; Referee: Jarred Gillett |

| 26 December 2022 16 | Leicester City | 0–3 | Newcastle United | Leicester |
| 15:00 GMT | | Report | Wood 3' (pen.); Almirón 7'; Joelinton 32' | Stadium: King Power Stadium; Attendance: 32,185; Referee: Jarred Gillett |

| 30 December 2022 17 | Liverpool | 2–1 | Leicester City | Liverpool |
| 20:00 GMT | Faes 38', 45' (o.g.) | Report | Dewsbury-Hall 4'; Soumaré (yellow card) 67' | Stadium: Anfield; Attendance: 53,343; Referee: Craig Pawson |

| 3 January 2023 18 | Leicester City | 0–1 | Fulham | Leicester |
| 19:45 GMT | Ndidi (yellow card) 61'; Castagne (yellow card) 74' | Report | Mitrović 17', (yellow card) 78'; Adarabioyo (yellow card) 52'; Palhinha (yellow card) 60'; Cairney (yellow card) 62'; Tete (yellow card) 68'; Leno (yellow card) 90+6' | Stadium: King Power Stadium; Attendance: 30,813; Referee: Darren Bond |

| 14 January 2023 19 | Nottingham Forest | 2–0 | Leicester City | West Bridgford |
| 15:00 GMT | Johnson 56', 84', (yellow card) 86' | Report | Tielemans (yellow card) 29'; Amartey (yellow card) 77' | Stadium: City Ground; Attendance: 29,301; Referee: Paul Tierney |

| 21 January 2023 20 | Leicester City | 2–2 | Brighton & Hove Albion | Leicester |
| 15:00 GMT | Albrighton 38'; Barnes 63' | Report | Mitoma 27'; Ferguson 88'; Mac Allister (yellow card) 90+3' | Stadium: King Power Stadium; Attendance: 32,056; Referee: Thomas Bramall |

| 4 February 2023 21 | Aston Villa | 2–4 | Leicester City | Birmingham |
| 15:00 GMT | Watkins 9'; Souttar 32' (o.g.) | Report | Maddison 12'; Iheanacho 41'; Tetê 45+2'; Castagne (yellow card) 56'; Praet 79'; Söyüncü (yellow card) 86'; Tielemans (yellow card) 88' | Stadium: Villa Park; Attendance: 42,055; Referee: Darren England |

| 11 February 2023 22 | Leicester City | 4–1 | Tottenham Hotspur | Leicester |
| 15:00 GMT | Faes (yellow card) 12'; Mendy 23'; Maddison 25', (yellow card) 40'; Iheanacho 45+4'; Dewsbury-Hall (yellow card) 59'; Barnes (yellow card) 66', (goal) 81'; Souttar (yellow card) 74' | Report | Bentancur (yellow card) 4', (goal) 14'; Dier (yellow card) 55' | Stadium: King Power Stadium; Attendance: 32,184; Referee: Michael Salisbury |

| 19 February 2023 23 | Manchester United | 3–0 | Leicester City | Old Trafford |
| 14:00 GMT | Rashford 25', 56'; Sancho 61' | Report | Faes (yellow card) 45+2'; Mendy (yellow card) 48' | Stadium: Old Trafford; Attendance: 73,578; Referee: Stuart Attwell |

| 25 February 2023 24 | Leicester City | 0–1 | Arsenal | Leicester |
| 15:00 GMT | | Report | Martinelli (yellow card) 38', (goal) 46' | Stadium: King Power Stadium; Attendance: 32,227; Referee: Craig Pawson |

| 4 March 2023 25 | Southampton | 1–0 | Leicester City | Southampton |
| 17:30 GMT | Alcaraz (yellow card) 21', (goal) 35'; Adams (yellow card) 62'; A. Armstrong (yellow card) 77'; Ward-Prowse (yellow card) 90+4' | Report | Barnes (yellow card) 43'; Maddison (yellow card) 45+4' | Stadium: St Mary's Stadium; Attendance: 30,139; Referee: Robert Jones |

| 11 March 2023 26 | Leicester City | 1–3 | Chelsea | Leicester |
| 15:00 GMT | Faes (yellow card) 19' (yellow-red card) 87'; Daka 39'; Pereira (yellow card) 51' | Report | Chilwell 11'; W. Fofana (yellow card) 13'; Cucurella (yellow card) 31'; Havertz 45+6'; Kovačić 78' | Stadium: King Power Stadium; Attendance: 32,170; Referee: Andre Marriner |

| 18 March 2023 27 | Brentford | 1–1 | Leicester City | Brentford |
| 15:00 GMT | Jensen 32'; Nørgaard (yellow card) 40'; Baptiste (yellow card) 89' (yellow-red card) 90+2' | Report | Maddison (yellow card) 22'; Barnes 52'; Soumaré (yellow card) 84' | Stadium: Brentford Community Stadium; Attendance: 17,006; Referee: Darren Bond |

| 1 April 2023 28 | Crystal Palace | 2–1 | Leicester City | Selhurst |
| 15:00 BST | Iversen 59' (o.g.); Eze (yellow card) 81'; Guéhi (yellow card) 88'; Mateta 90+4', (yellow card) 90+5' | Report | Kristiansen (yellow card) 29'; Pereira 56'; Souttar (yellow card) 68'; Dewsbury-Hall (yellow card) 83'; Ndidi (yellow card) 89' | Stadium: Selhurst Park; Attendance: 25,143; Referee: Tim Robinson |

| 4 April 2023 29 | Leicester City | 1–2 | Aston Villa | Leicester |
| 19:45 BST | Barnes 35'; Castagne (yellow card) 54'; Dewsbury-Hall (yellow card) 64' (yellow-red card) 70'; Faes (yellow card) 89' | Report | Watkins 24'; Traoré 87' | Stadium: King Power Stadium; Attendance: 32,087; Referee: Graham Scott |
Note: The match was originally scheduled for 10 September 2022, but was postponed following the death of Queen Elizabeth II on 8 September.

| 8 April 2023 30 | Leicester City | 0–1 | Bournemouth | Leicester |
| 15:00 BST | | Report | Rothwell (yellow card) 33'; Billing 40'; Kelly (yellow card) 79'; Smith (yellow card) 80' | Stadium: King Power Stadium; Attendance: 32,094; Referee: David Coote |

| 15 April 2023 31 | Manchester City | 3–1 | Leicester City | Manchester |
| 17:30 BST | Stones 5'; Haaland 13' (pen.), 25'; Silva (yellow card) 45' | Report | Iheanacho 75'; Söyüncü (yellow card) 89' | Stadium: City of Manchester Stadium; Attendance: 53,329; Referee: Darren England |

| 22 April 2023 32 | Leicester City | 2–1 | Wolverhampton Wanderers | Leicester |
| 15:00 BST | Iheanacho 37' (pen.); Soumaré (yellow card) 60'; Castagne 75' | Report | Cunha 13', (yellow card) 65'; Sá (yellow card) 34'; Toti (yellow card) 42' | Stadium: King Power Stadium; Attendance: 32,053; Referee: Andrew Madley |

| 25 April 2023 33 | Leeds United | 1–1 | Leicester City | Leeds |
| 20:00 BST | Sinisterra 20'; Ayling (yellow card) 41'; Rodrigo (yellow card) 45+2'; Roca (yellow card) 53'; Cooper (yellow card) 60' | Report | Soumaré (yellow card) 52'; Tielemans (yellow card) 67'; Vardy 80' | Stadium: Elland Road; Attendance: 36,666; Referee: Paul Tierney |

| 1 May 2023 34 | Leicester City | 2–2 | Everton | Leicester |
| 20:00 BST | Söyüncü 22'; Vardy 33'; Soumaré (yellow card) 44'; Thomas (yellow card) 53'; Maddison (yellow card) 89'; Kristiansen (yellow card) 90+2' | Report | Calvert-Lewin 15' (pen.); Iwobi 54'; Gueye (yellow card) 56' | Stadium: King Power Stadium; Attendance: 32,173; Referee: Michael Oliver |

| 8 May 2023 35 | Fulham | 5–3 | Leicester City | Fulham |
| 15:00 BST | Willian 10', 70'; Carlos Vinícius 18'; Cairney 44', 51' | Report | Barnes (yellow card) 24', (goal) 59', 89'; Maddison (yellow card) 58', (goal) 81' (pen.); Soumaré (yellow card) 70' | Stadium: Craven Cottage; Attendance: 24,442; Referee: Robert Jones |

| 15 May 2023 36 | Leicester City | 0–3 | Liverpool | Leicester |
| 20:00 BST | Pereira (yellow card) 53'; Thomas (yellow card) 90+1' | Report | Jones 33', 36'; Alexander-Arnold 71'; Konaté (yellow card) 86' | Stadium: King Power Stadium; Attendance: 32,225; Referee: Craig Pawson |

| 22 May 2023 37 | Newcastle United | 0–0 | Leicester City | Newcastle upon Tyne |
| 20:00 BST | Bruno Guimarães (yellow card) 8'; Isak (yellow card) 27' | Report | | Stadium: St James' Park; Attendance: 52,152; Referee: Andre Marriner |

| 28 May 2023 38 | Leicester City | 2–1 | West Ham United | Leicester |
| 16:30 BST | Barnes 34'; Faes 62'; Evans (yellow card) 66' | Report | Ings (yellow card) 67'; Fornals 79' | Stadium: King Power Stadium; Attendance: 32,183; Referee: Simon Hooper |

=== FA Cup ===
The Foxes entered the FA Cup in the third round and won away against Gillingham. They also won away against Walsall in the fourth round. They were eliminated by Blackburn Rovers in the fifth round following a 2–1 home defeat.

Win Draw Loss Fixtures

| 7 January 2023 Third round | Gillingham | 0–1 | Leicester City | Gillingham |
| 12:30 GMT | | Report | Iheanacho 56' | Stadium: Priestfield Stadium; Attendance: 8,567; Referee: Sam Barrott |

| 28 January 2023 Fourth round | Walsall | 0–1 | Leicester City | Walsall |
| 12:30 GMT | White (yellow card) 27' | Report | Maddison (yellow card) 17'; Iheanacho 68' | Stadium: Bescot Stadium; Attendance: 10,297; Referee: Gavin Ward |

| 28 February 2023 Fifth round | Leicester City | 1–2 | Blackburn Rovers | Leicester |
| 19:30 GMT | Thomas (yellow card) 16'; Iheanacho 67', (yellow card) 83'; Mendy (yellow card) 90+4' | Report | Dolan 33'; Szmodics 52', (yellow card) 83' | Stadium: King Power Stadium; Attendance: 23,379; Referee: Tim Robinson |

=== EFL Cup ===
Leicester entered the competition in the second round and were drawn away to Stockport County. They won at home against Newport County in the third round, and won away against Milton Keynes Dons in the fourth round. The Foxes were knocked out of the competition away to Newcastle United in the quarter-finals.

Win Draw Loss Fixtures

| 23 August 2022 Second round | Stockport County | 0–0 (1–3 p) | Leicester City | Stockport |
| 19:45 BST | Quigley (yellow card) 90+4' | Report | | Stadium: Edgeley Park; Attendance: 10,301; Referee: Sam Barrott |
| | Penalties |
| | Sarcevic (penalty missed); Quigley (penalty missed); Croasdale (penalty scored); Wootton (penalty missed) | | (penalty scored) Tielemans; (penalty missed) Maddison; (penalty scored) Barnes; (penalty missed) Pérez; (penalty scored) Dewsbury-Hall |

| 8 November 2022 Third round | Leicester City | 3–0 | Newport County | Leicester |
| 19:45 GMT | Justin 44'; Vardy 70', 82' | Report | | Stadium: King Power Stadium; Attendance: 15,081; Referee: Darren Bond |

| 20 December 2022 Fourth round | Milton Keynes Dons | 0–3 | Leicester City | Milton Keynes |
| 19:45 GMT | | Report | Tielemans 18'; Pérez 29'; Vardy 50' | Stadium: Stadium MK; Attendance: 15,495; Referee: Andre Marriner |

| 10 January 2023 Quarter-finals | Newcastle United | 2–0 | Leicester City | Newcastle upon Tyne |
| 20:00 GMT | Longstaff (yellow card) 36'; Burn (yellow card) 38', (goal) 60'; Joelinton 72'; Botman (yellow card) 81' | Report | Pérez (yellow card) 62'; Ndidi (yellow card) 67' | Stadium: St James' Park; Attendance: 52,009; Referee: Darren England |

== Squad statistics ==
=== Appearances ===
- Italics indicate a loaned player

| No. | Pos | Nat | Player | Total | | Premier League | | FA Cup | | EFL Cup | |
| No. | Pos | Nat | Player | Apps | Goals | Apps | Goals | Apps | Goals | Apps | Goals |
|---|---|---|---|---|---|---|---|---|---|---|---|
| 1 | GK | (Wales) | Danny Ward | 28 | 0 | 26 | 0 | 0 | 0 | 2 | 0 |
| 2 | DF | (England) | James Justin | 15 | 1 | 14 | 0 | 0 | 0 | 1 | 1 |
| 3 | DF | (Belgium) | Wout Faes | 36 | 1 | 31 | 1 | 2 | 0 | 3 | 0 |
| 4 | DF | (Turkey) | Çağlar Söyüncü | 9 | 1 | 6+1 | 1 | 1 | 0 | 1 | 0 |
| 5 | DF | (England) | Ryan Bertrand | 0 | 0 | 0 | 0 | 0 | 0 | 0 | 0 |
| 6 | DF | (Northern Ireland) | Jonny Evans | 14 | 0 | 12+1 | 0 | 0 | 0 | 1 | 0 |
| 7 | MF | (England) | Harvey Barnes | 40 | 13 | 32+2 | 13 | 2 | 0 | 4 | 0 |
| 8 | MF | (Belgium) | Youri Tielemans | 37 | 4 | 27+4 | 3 | 2 | 0 | 3+1 | 1 |
| 9 | FW | (England) | Jamie Vardy | 40 | 6 | 18+17 | 3 | 2 | 0 | 2+1 | 3 |
| 10 | MF | (England) | James Maddison | 31 | 10 | 27+2 | 10 | 1 | 0 | 0+1 | 0 |
| 12 | GK | (England) | Alex Smithies | 0 | 0 | 0 | 0 | 0 | 0 | 0 | 0 |
| 14 | FW | (Nigeria) | Kelechi Iheanacho | 35 | 8 | 12+16 | 5 | 1+2 | 3 | 1+3 | 0 |
| 15 | DF | (Australia) | Harry Souttar | 12 | 0 | 11+1 | 0 | 0 | 0 | 0 | 0 |
| 16 | DF | (Denmark) | Victor Kristiansen | 14 | 0 | 11+1 | 0 | 0+2 | 0 | 0 | 0 |
| 18 | DF | (Ghana) | Daniel Amartey | 24 | 0 | 18+2 | 0 | 2 | 0 | 2 | 0 |
| 20 | FW | (Zambia) | Patson Daka | 36 | 4 | 13+17 | 4 | 1+2 | 0 | 2+1 | 0 |
| 21 | DF | (Portugal) | Ricardo Pereira | 11 | 1 | 5+5 | 1 | 1 | 0 | 0 | 0 |
| 22 | MF | (England) | Kiernan Dewsbury-Hall | 34 | 2 | 28+3 | 2 | 2 | 0 | 0+1 | 0 |
| 23 | DF | (Denmark) | Jannik Vestergaard | 3 | 0 | 0 | 0 | 1 | 0 | 1+1 | 0 |
| 24 | MF | (Senegal) | Nampalys Mendy | 24 | 1 | 7+12 | 1 | 2+1 | 0 | 1+1 | 0 |
| 25 | MF | (Nigeria) | Wilfred Ndidi | 30 | 0 | 19+8 | 0 | 0+1 | 0 | 2 | 0 |
| 26 | MF | (Belgium) | Dennis Praet | 27 | 1 | 6+16 | 1 | 1+1 | 0 | 3 | 0 |
| 27 | DF | (Belgium) | Timothy Castagne | 42 | 2 | 36+1 | 2 | 1+1 | 0 | 2+1 | 0 |
| 31 | GK | (Denmark) | Daniel Iversen | 16 | 0 | 11 | 0 | 3 | 0 | 2 | 0 |
| 33 | DF | (England) | Luke Thomas | 24 | 0 | 11+6 | 0 | 2+1 | 0 | 4 | 0 |
| 34 | DF | (England) | Lewis Brunt | 2 | 0 | 0+1 | 0 | 1 | 0 | 0 | 0 |
| 37 | MF | (Brazil) | Tetê | 14 | 1 | 9+4 | 1 | 1 | 0 | 0 | 0 |
| 40 | MF | (Portugal) | Wanya Marçal-Madivadua | 0 | 0 | 0 | 0 | 0 | 0 | 0 | 0 |
| 42 | MF | (France) | Boubakary Soumaré | 29 | 0 | 20+6 | 0 | 1 | 0 | 2 | 0 |
| 44 | MF | (England) | Sammy Braybrooke | 1 | 0 | 0 | 0 | 0 | 0 | 0+1 | 0 |
| 57 | MF | (England) | Will Alves | 1 | 0 | 0 | 0 | 0 | 0 | 0+1 | 0 |
| 60 | DF | (England) | Joe Wormleighton | 0 | 0 | 0 | 0 | 0 | 0 | 0 | 0 |
Out on loan:
| 11 | MF | (England) | Marc Albrighton | 11 | 1 | 1+5 | 1 | 1 | 0 | 2+2 | 0 |
| 17 | FW | (Spain) | Ayoze Pérez | 13 | 1 | 3+5 | 0 | 1 | 0 | 3+1 | 1 |
| 29 | MF | (England) | Hamza Choudhury | 0 | 0 | 0 | 0 | 0 | 0 | 0 | 0 |
| 41 | GK | (Poland) | Jakub Stolarczyk | 0 | 0 | 0 | 0 | 0 | 0 | 0 | 0 |
| 47 | MF | (England) | Kasey McAteer | 2 | 0 | 0 | 0 | 1 | 0 | 0+1 | 0 |
Left club during season:
| 1 | GK | (Denmark) | Kasper Schmeichel | 0 | 0 | 0 | 0 | 0 | 0 | 0 | 0 |
| 3 | DF | (France) | Wesley Fofana | 2 | 0 | 2 | 0 | 0 | 0 | 0 | 0 |

=== Goalscorers ===
| Rank | No. | Pos. | Nat. | Player | Premier League | FA Cup | EFL Cup | Total |
|---|---|---|---|---|---|---|---|---|
| 1 | 7 | MF | (England) | Harvey Barnes | 13 | 0 | 0 | 13 |
| 2 | 10 | MF | (England) | James Maddison | 10 | 0 | 0 | 10 |
| 3 | 14 | FW | (Nigeria) | Kelechi Iheanacho | 5 | 3 | 0 | 8 |
| 4 | 9 | FW | (England) | Jamie Vardy | 3 | 0 | 3 | 6 |
| 5 | 20 | FW | (Zambia) | Patson Daka | 4 | 0 | 0 | 4 |
| 5 | 8 | MF | (Belgium) | Youri Tielemans | 3 | 0 | 1 | 4 |
| 7 | 22 | MF | (England) | Kiernan Dewsbury-Hall | 2 | 0 | 0 | 2 |
| 7 | 27 | DF | (Belgium) | Timothy Castagne | 2 | 0 | 0 | 2 |
| 9 | 11 | MF | (England) | Marc Albrighton | 1 | 0 | 0 | 1 |
| 9 | 37 | FW | (Brazil) | Tetê | 1 | 0 | 0 | 1 |
| 9 | 26 | MF | (Belgium) | Dennis Praet | 1 | 0 | 0 | 1 |
| 9 | 24 | MF | (Senegal) | Nampalys Mendy | 1 | 0 | 0 | 1 |
| 9 | 21 | DF | (Portugal) | Ricardo Pereira | 1 | 0 | 0 | 1 |
| 9 | 4 | DF | (Turkey) | Çağlar Söyüncü | 1 | 0 | 0 | 1 |
| 9 | 3 | DF | (Belgium) | Wout Faes | 1 | 0 | 0 | 1 |
| 9 | 2 | DF | (England) | James Justin | 0 | 0 | 1 | 1 |
| 9 | 17 | FW | (Spain) | Ayoze Perez | 0 | 0 | 1 | 1 |
| Own goals | | | | | 2 | 0 | 0 | 2 |
| Total | | | | | 51 | 3 | 6 | 60 |

=== Clean sheets ===
| Rank | No. | Pos. | Nat. | Player | Premier League | FA Cup | EFL Cup | Total |
|---|---|---|---|---|---|---|---|---|
| 1 | 1 | GK | (Wales) | Danny Ward | 6 | 0 | 1 | 7 |
| 2 | 31 | GK | (Denmark) | Daniel Iversen | 1 | 2 | 2 | 5 |
| Total | | | | | 7 | 2 | 3 | 12 |
