= Arjan Raikhy =

English footballer (born 2002)

Personal information
- Full name: Arjan Singh Raikhy
- Date of birth: 20 October 2002 (age 24)
- Place of birth: Wolverhampton, England
- Position: Midfielder

Team information
- Current team: Marine (on loan from Boston United)

Youth career
- West Bromwich Albion
- –2021: Aston Villa

Senior career*
Years	Team	Apps	(Gls)
2021–2023	Aston Villa	0	(0)
2021–2022	→ Stockport County (loan)	5	(0)
2022	→ Grimsby Town (loan)	7	(0)
2023–2025	Leicester City	1	(0)
2025	→ Tamworth (loan)	7	(0)
2025–	Boston United	8	(0)
2025–2026	→ Morecambe (loan)	10	(0)
2026–	→ Marine (loan)	0	(0)
- * Club domestic league appearances and goals as of 17:20, 9 October 2026 (UTC)

Arjan Singh Raikhy (born 20 October 2002) is an English footballer who plays as a midfielder for Marine on loan from National League club Boston United. He is a product of the Aston Villa and West Bromwich Albion academies.

== Career ==
=== Youth football ===
Raikhy played at West Bromwich Albion in his early teens, before switching to the nearby Aston Villa Academy.

Having played regularly for the under-18 side in the 2019–20 season, Raikhy featured for the Aston Villa U21 side in the EFL Trophy against Carlisle United, losing 3–1.

Having been a key player in Villa's Under-18 FA Youth Cup squad that season, on 24 May 2021, Raikhy was part of the side that defeated Liverpool U18 2–1 in the final.

=== Aston Villa debut and loans ===
Raikhy was named in the Aston Villa starting line-up for his senior debut on 8 January 2021 in an FA Cup third-round tie against Liverpool. On 7 July 2021, Raikhy was one of several young players who signed a new contract with Aston Villa.

On 20 August, Raikhy joined National League side Stockport County on a season-long loan. He made his National League debut in a 1–0 victory over Southend United. He made eight appearances for Stockport, including one man of the match award, before being recalled to Aston Villa on 3 January 2022.

On 24 January 2022, Raikhy went on loan to the National League once again, this time joining Grimsby Town until the end of the season. The following day, he made his Grimsby debut as a second-half substitute in a 1–0 defeat to Wrexham. On 5 June 2022, Raikhy played in the National League play-off final at the London Stadium as Grimsby beat Solihull Moors in extra time to secure promotion back to the Football League. This marked an unusual achievement, as both of the teams he had been at loan to in that National League season had been promoted.

On 16 June 2023, Raikhy was released by Aston Villa.

=== Leicester City ===
On 17 August 2023, Raikhy signed for Leicester City. On 27 January 2024, he made his debut for the club as an 81st-minute substitute in a 3–0 FA Cup home win against Birmingham City.

=== Boston United ===
On 5 July 2025, Raikhy signed for National League club Boston United on a two-year deal.

On 17 September 2025, he joined Morecambe on loan. On 17 December, his loan was extended for the remainder of the season. However, on 17 January 2026, Raikhy was recalled from the loan by Boston United.

On 8 October 2026, he joined National League North side Marine on an initial one-month loan.

== Personal life ==
Raikhy is from a British Punjabi Sikh family, he was born in Wolverhampton and attended school in Telford.

== Career statistics ==
As of match played 31 January 2026

Club	Season	League			FA Cup		EFL Cup		Other		Total	
Club	Season	Division	Apps	Goals	Apps	Goals	Apps	Goals	Apps	Goals	Apps	Goals
Aston Villa	2020–21	Premier League	0	0	1	0	0	0	1 (Note: Appearance(s) in EFL Trophy)	0	2	0
Aston Villa	2021–22	Premier League	0	0	0	0	0	0	0	0	0	0
Aston Villa	2022–23	Premier League	0	0	0	0	0	0	3	0	3	0
Aston Villa	Total		0	0	1	0	0	0	4	0	5	0
Stockport County (loan)	2021–22	National League	5	0	3	0	—		0	0	8	0
Grimsby Town (loan)	2021–22	National League	7	0	0	0	—		2 (Note: Appearances in National League play-offs)	0	9	0
Leicester City	2023–24	Championship	1	0	2	0	0	0	3	1	6	1
Leicester City	2024–25	Premier League	0	0	0	0	0	0	0	0	0	0
Leicester City	Total		1	0	2	0	0	0	3	1	6	1
Tamworth (loan)	2024–25	National League	7	0	0	0	—		0	0	7	0
Boston United	2025–26	National League	4	0	0	0	—		3 (Note: Appearances in National League Cup)	0	7	0
Morecambe (loan)	2025–26	National League	10	0	0	0	—		0	0	10	0
Career total			34	0	6	0	0	0	12	1	52	1

== Honours ==
Grimsby Town

- National League play-offs: 2022

Leicester City

- EFL Championship: 2023–24

== See also ==
- List of Sikh Footballers
