= Mads Hermansen =

Danish footballer (born 2000)

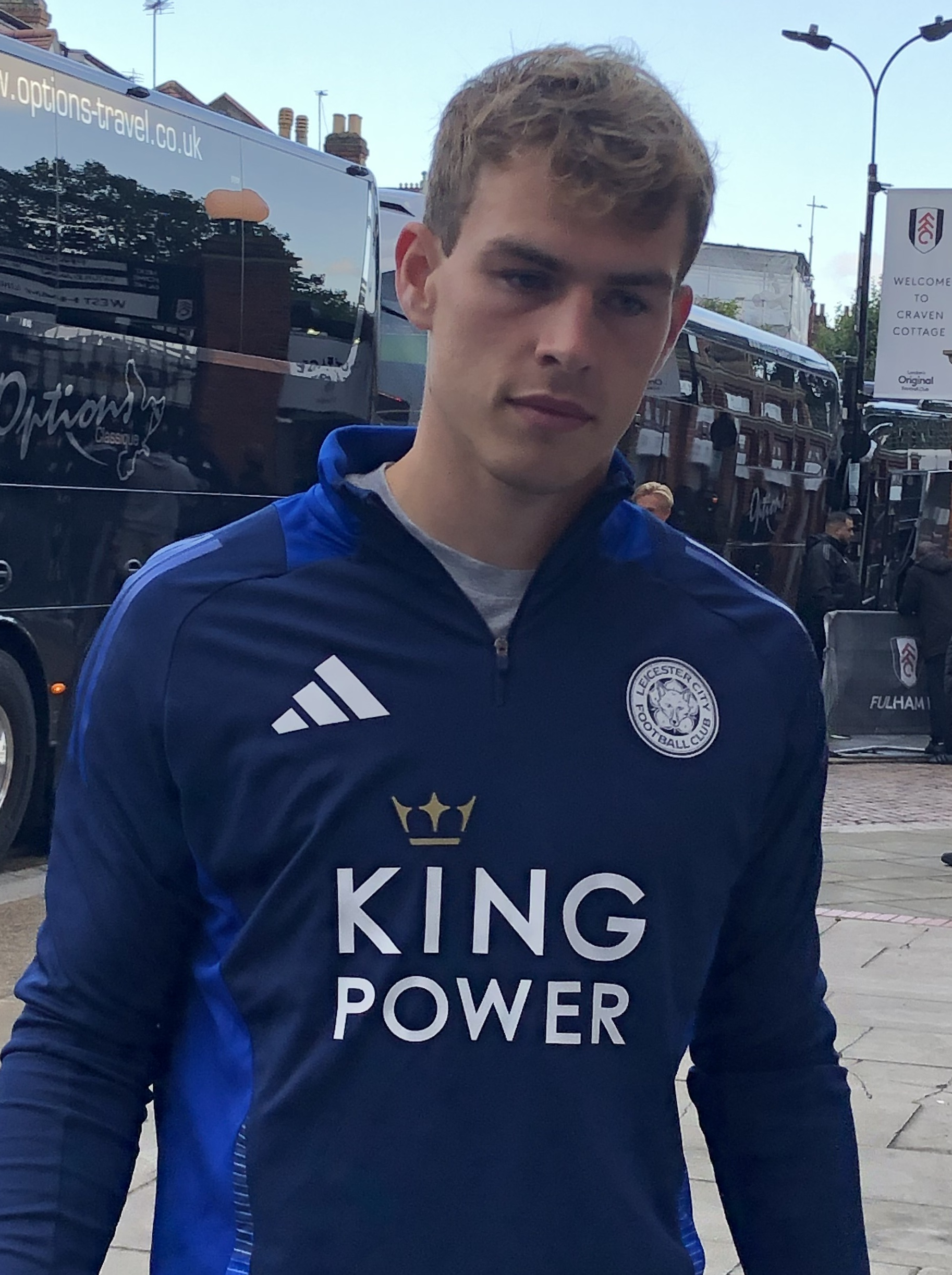
- Hermansen with Leicester City in 2024

Personal information
- Full name: Mads Hermansen
- Date of birth: 11 July 2000 (age 26)
- Place of birth: Odense, Denmark
- Height: 1.87 m (6 ft 2 in)
- Position: Goalkeeper

Team information
- Current team: West Ham United
- Number: 1

Youth career
- 2011–2015: Næsby
- 2015–2019: Brøndby

Senior career*
Years	Team	Apps	(Gls)
2019–2023	Brøndby	56	(0)
2023–2025	Leicester City	71	(0)
2025–	West Ham United	33	(0)

International career^{‡}
2015–2016	Denmark U16	4	(0)
2016–2017	Denmark U17	4	(0)
2017–2018	Denmark U18	3	(0)
2018–2019	Denmark U19	9	(0)
2021–2022	Denmark U21	8	(0)
2026–	Denmark	7	(0)
- * Club domestic league appearances and goals as of 17:01, 7 November 2026 (UTC) ‡ National team caps and goals as of 18:35, 17 November 2026 (UTC)

Mads Hermansen (born 11 July 2000) is a Danish professional footballer who plays as a goalkeeper for EFL Championship club West Ham United, and the Denmark national team.

== Club career ==
=== Brøndby ===
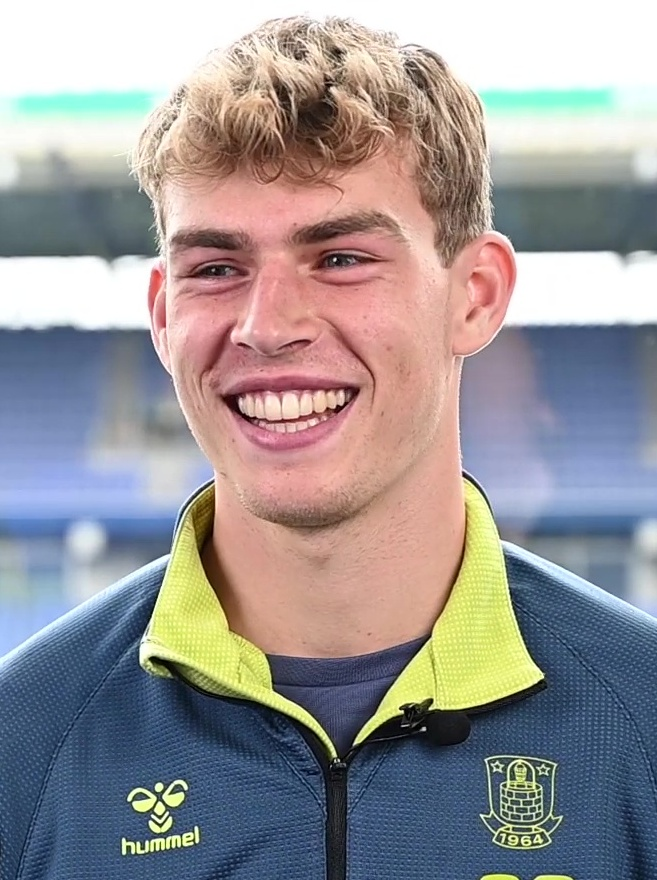
Hermansen with Brøndby in 2021

Born in Odense, Denmark, Hermansen began his youth career at Næsby. As a ten-year-old, he transitioned from being an outfielder into a goalkeeper after suffering from achilles tendinitis.

In September 2015, Hermansen moved to Brøndby. He was promoted to the first team prior to the 2019–20 season.

On 5 November 2020, Hermansen made his professional debut in a Danish Cup match against Ledøje-Smørum, which ended in a 1–0 win for Brøndby. At the end of the 2020–21 season, Brøndby became Danish champions for the first time since 2005, with Hermansen featuring as the backup to German goalkeeper Marvin Schwäbe. As a result, he did not make a league appearance.

After Schwäbe's departure to 1. FC Köln, Hermansen assumed to role as starting goalkeeper. He made his debut in the Danish Superliga on 18 July 2021 in a 1–1 draw against AGF. The following month, on 17 August, Hermansen made his European debut in a 2–1 loss to Red Bull Salzburg in the first leg of the play-off round of the UEFA Champions League. Despite the loss, Hermansen impressed in goal with vital saves.

On 3 December 2022, Hermansen received the award of Brøndby Player of the Year 2022 after putting in strong performances through the year.

=== Leicester City ===
On 18 July 2023, Hermansen signed for Championship club Leicester City on a five-year deal. He made his competitive debut for the Foxes on the opening matchday of the season, providing crucial saves to help secure the team a 2–1 league victory against Coventry City. However, he would pick up a quad injury during training a few days later, sidelining him for the following league game against Huddersfield Town. He returned to the starting line-up on 19 August in a league win against Cardiff City.

On 20 September, he kept his first clean sheet after joining the Foxes, helping his side to a 2–0 away victory against Norwich City at Carrow Road. After the game, Hermansen discussed his role as ball-playing goalkeeper in manager Enzo Maresca's team, saying: "He (Maresca) gives me a lot of responsibility and I really appreciate that ... I like to try to dictate the game. As a lot of teams do, they leave me open and play man-to-man with the rest of the guys, so it's up to me to find these smaller passes, to try to move things around and create these spaces." His strong form throughout the season earned him a place in the EFL Championship Team of the Season, as Leicester won the division title and secured promotion back to the Premier League.

Hermansen made his Premier League debut in the opening fixture of the season on 19 August 2024, starting in a 1–1 home draw against Tottenham Hotspur.

=== West Ham United ===
On 9 August 2025, Hermansen signed for West Ham United on a five-year deal. The fee was reported to be worth around £20 million. On 16 August 2025, he made his competitive debut in a 3–0 loss to Sunderland at the Stadium of Light. This was followed by a 5–1 home defeat to Chelsea, on 22 August 2025, making eight goals conceded in his first two games for West Ham.

== International career ==
Hermansen has represented Denmark at youth level from under-16 to under-21.

In November 2020, he received his first call-up to the Denmark under-21 team. He made his debut on 7 September 2021, keeping a clean sheet in a 1–0 win over Kazakhstan in 2023 UEFA European Under-21 Championship qualification.

Hermansen was first called up to the senior Denmark squad in 2023, and was included in the squads for UEFA Euro 2024 qualifying matches in June, September and October that year.

In March 2026, Hermansen was selected to start Denmark's 2026 FIFA World Cup qualification play-off against North Macedonia in the absence of Kasper Schmeichel. He made his senior debut in the match, keeping a clean sheet in a 4–0 win.

== Style of play ==
Hermansen is renowned for his ball-playing skills, alongside shot-stopping talent. He is also considered a specialist in saving penalties, having done so in crucial occasions including a UEFA Europa Conference League qualifier against Basel in 2022 and a derby against Copenhagen, as well as a triple penalty save against FC Nordsjælland in 2023.

== Career statistics ==
=== Club ===
As of match played 7 November 2026

Appearances and goals by club, season and competition
Club	Season	League			National cup (Note: Includes Danish Cup, FA Cup)		League cup (Note: Includes EFL Cup)		Europe		Total	
Club	Season	Division	Apps	Goals	Apps	Goals	Apps	Goals	Apps	Goals	Apps	Goals
Brøndby	2020–21	Danish Superliga	0	0	1	0	—		—		1	0
Brøndby	2021–22	Danish Superliga	29	0	2	0	—		7 (Note: Two appearances in UEFA Champions League, five appearances in UEFA Europa League)	0	38	0
Brøndby	2022–23	Danish Superliga	27	0	0	0	—		4 (Note: Appearances in UEFA Europa Conference League)	0	31	0
Brøndby	Total		56	0	3	0	—		11	0	70	0
Leicester City	2023–24	Championship	44	0	0	0	0	0	—		44	0
Leicester City	2024–25	Premier League	27	0	1	0	0	0	—		28	0
Leicester City	Total		71	0	1	0	0	0	—		72	0
West Ham United	2025–26	Premier League	18	0	1	0	0	0	—		19	0
West Ham United	2026–27	Championship	15	0	0	0	1	0	—		16	0
West Ham United	Total		33	0	1	0	1	0	—		35	0
Career total			159	0	5	0	1	0	11	0	176	0

=== International ===
As of match played 17 November 2026

Appearances and goals by national team and year
National team	Year	Apps	Goals
Denmark	2026	7	0
Total		7	0

== Honours ==
Brøndby

- Danish Superliga: 2020–21

Leicester City

- EFL Championship: 2023–24

Individual

- Brøndby Player of the Year: 2022
- EFL Championship Team of the Season: 2023–24
