= Ben Nelson (footballer, born 2004) =

English footballer

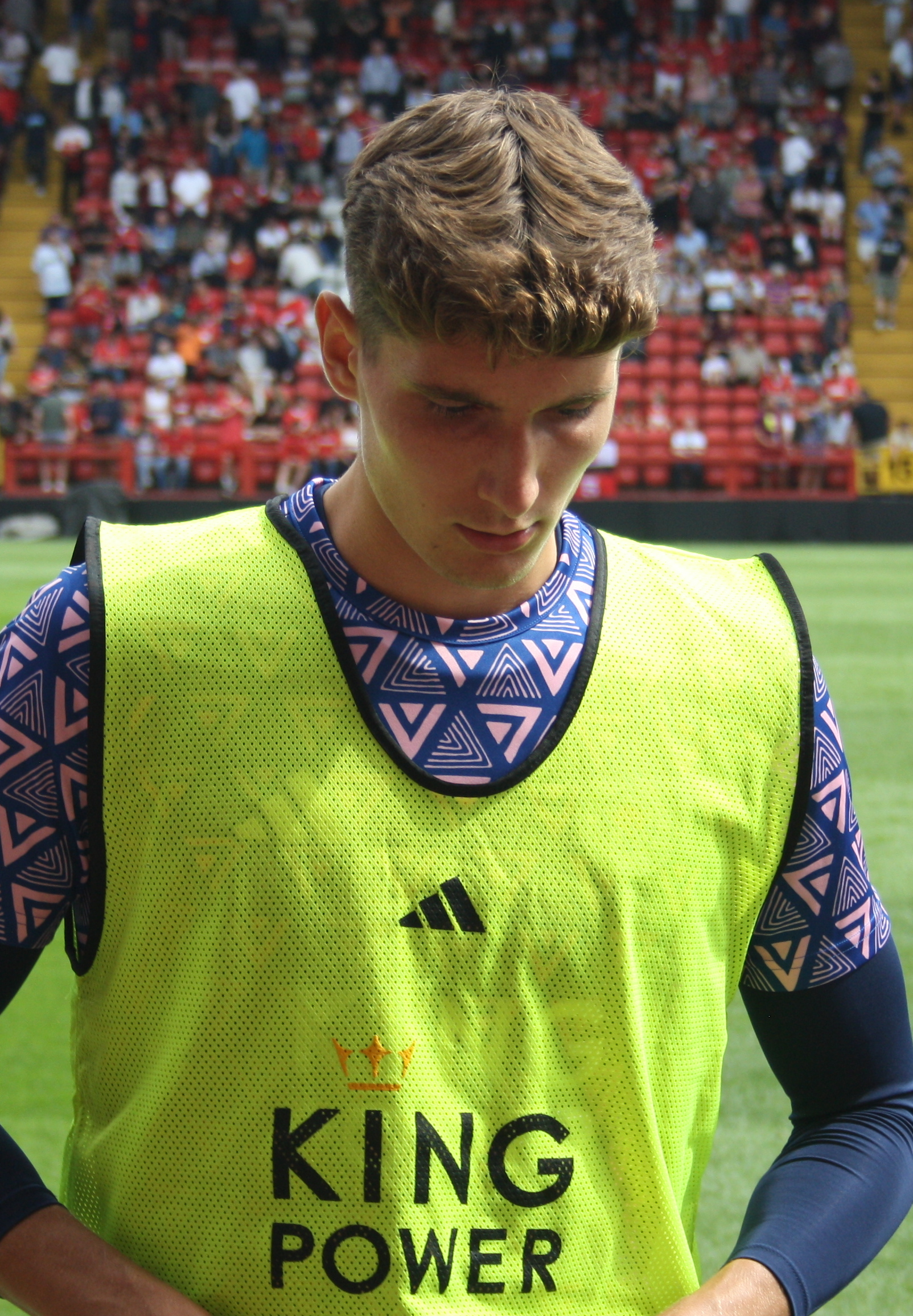
- Ben Nelson in 2025.

Personal information
- Birth name: Benjamin Harvey Nelson
- Date of birth: 18 March 2004 (age 22)
- Place of birth: Northampton, England
- Height: 1.95 m (6 ft 5 in)
- Position: Defender

Team information
- Current team: Leicester City
- Number: 4

Youth career
- 2013–2020: Leicester City

Senior career*
Years	Team	Apps	(Gls)
2020–	Leicester City	29	(2)
2022–2023	→ Rochdale (loan)	10	(0)
2023	→ Doncaster Rovers (loan)	15	(0)
2024–2025	→ Oxford United (loan)	17	(1)

International career^{‡}
2020	Scotland U16	1	(0)
2021–2022	England U18	6	(0)
2022–2023	England U19	5	(0)
2024–2025	England U20	6	(1)
- * Club domestic league appearances and goals as of 15:42, 12 May 2026 (UTC) ‡ National team caps and goals as of 18:54, 23 March 2025 (UTC)

Benjamin Harvey Nelson (born 18 March 2004) is an English professional footballer who plays as a centre-back or left-back for EFL League One club Leicester City.

== Club career ==
Nelson joined Leicester City's youth team at the age of 9. In the 2020–21 season, Nelson featured in a first-team squad during Leicester City's UEFA Europa League campaign. He was named Academy Player of the Season at the end of the season.

On 28 July 2022, Nelson joined EFL League Two side Rochdale on a season-long loan. He was recalled from his loan on 6 January 2023. Later that month he joined Doncaster Rovers on loan for the remainder of the season.

In the 2023–24 season, Nelson was promoted to the first team. On 29 August 2023, he made his senior debut for Leicester as an 82nd-minute substitute for James Justin in a 2–0 away win over Tranmere Rovers in the Second Round of the EFL Cup. On 8 December 2023, he signed a new contract until 2027. On 9 December 2023, he made his league debut in the EFL Championship for Leicester as an 81st-minute substitute for Jannik Vestergaard in a 4–0 win against Plymouth Argyle. On 2 March 2024, he scored his first goal for the club in a 2–1 league defeat against Queens Park Rangers.

On 30 August 2024, Nelson signed for Championship side Oxford United on a season-long loan. On 5 November 2024, he tore tendons in his quadriceps muscle during United's 1–0 win against Hull City.

== International career ==
Nelson is eligible to play for either England or Scotland. After making one appearance for Scotland's under-16 team, he made his England U18 debut starting in a 3–2 defeat against the Netherlands on 11 November 2021.

On 21 September 2022, Nelson made his England U19 debut during a 2–0 2023 U19 EURO qualifying win over Montenegro.

On 22 March 2024, Nelson made a goalscoring debut for the England Elite League squad during a 5–1 win over Poland at the Bialystok City Stadium.

On 29 August 2025, Nelson was called up to the under-21s.

== Career statistics ==
As of match played 3 April 2026

Appearances and goals by club, season and competition
Club	Season	League			FA Cup		League Cup		Other		Total	
Club	Season	Division	Apps	Goals	Apps	Goals	Apps	Goals	Apps	Goals	Apps	Goals
Leicester City U21	2020–21	—			—		—		2 (Note: Appearances in EFL Trophy)	0	2	0
Leicester City U21	2021–22	—			—		—		1	0	1	0
Leicester City U21	Total		0	0	0	0	0	0	3	0	3	0
Leicester City	2023–24	Championship	5	1	3	0	1	0	—		9	1
Leicester City	2025–26	Championship	24	1	2	0	1	0	—		27	1
Leicester City	Total		29	2	5	0	2	0	0	0	36	2
Rochdale (loan)	2022–23	League Two	10	0	0	0	1	0	1	0	12	0
Doncaster Rovers (loan)	2022–23	League Two	15	0	0	0	0	0	0	0	15	0
Oxford United (loan)	2024–25	Championship	17	1	0	0	0	0	—		17	1
Career total			71	3	5	0	3	0	4	0	83	3

== Honours ==
Leicester City

- EFL Championship: 2023–24
