= 2023–24 Leicester City F.C. season =

Leicester City
2023–24 season
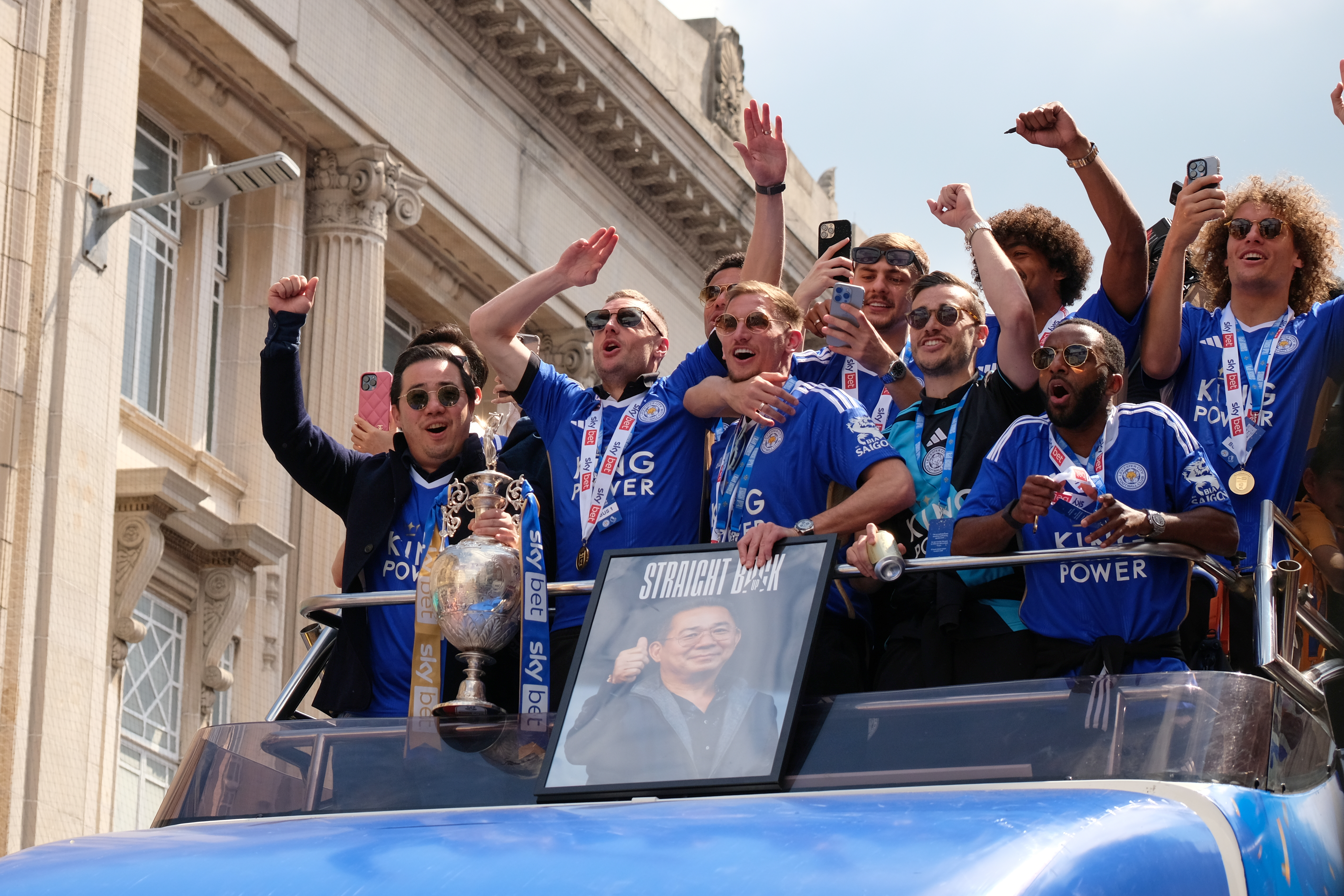
- Leicester City's chairman and players celebrate promotion after winning the Championship title
- Owner: King Power
- Chairman: Aiyawatt Srivaddhanaprabha
- Manager: Enzo Maresca
- Stadium: King Power Stadium
- Championship: 1st (promoted)
- FA Cup: Quarter-finals
- EFL Cup: Third round
- Top goalscorer: League: Jamie Vardy (18); All: Jamie Vardy (20)
- Average home league attendance: 31,238
Home colours	Away colours	Third colours

The 2023–24 season was the 119th season in the existence of Leicester City Football Club, and their 63rd (non-consecutive) season in the second tier of English football. This season marked the club's return to the Championship after nine consecutive seasons in the Premier League. In addition to the domestic league, they also competed in the season's editions of the FA Cup and the EFL Cup.

The Foxes officially sealed promotion back to the Premier League following Queens Park Rangers' 4–0 win against Leeds United on 26 April 2024. Three days later, following a 3–0 victory away to Preston North End, Leicester secured the Championship title and their record eighth second-tier title with one match to spare.

== Management team ==
Position	Name
Manager	(Italy) Enzo Maresca
Assistant Manager	(Argentina) Willy Caballero
First team coach	(England) Danny Walker
First team goalkeeper coach	(Italy) Michele De Bernardin

== Kits ==
Home	Away	Third
Goalkeeper 1	Goalkeeper 2	Goalkeeper 3

== Players ==
=== Squad information ===
Players and squad numbers last updated on 10 May 2024. Appearances include all competitions.
Note: Flags indicate national team as has been defined under FIFA eligibility rules. Players may hold more than one non-FIFA nationality.

No.	Player	Nat.	Position(s)	Date of birth (age)	Signed in	Contract ends	Signed from	Apps	Goals
Goalkeepers
1	Danny Ward	(Wales)	GK	22 June 1993 (aged 31)	2018	2025	(England) Liverpool	47	0
30	Mads Hermansen	(Denmark)	GK	11 July 2000 (aged 23)	2023	2028	(Denmark) Brøndby	44	0
41	Jakub Stolarczyk	(Poland)	GK	19 December 2000 (aged 23)	2019	2026	Youth Academy	9	0
Defenders
2	James Justin	(England)	LB / RB	23 February 1998 (aged 26)	2019	2026	(England) Luton Town	128	7
3	Wout Faes	(Belgium)	CB	3 April 1998 (aged 26)	2022	2027	(France) Reims	82	3
4	Conor Coady	(England)	CB	25 February 1993 (aged 31)	2023	2026	(England) Wolverhampton Wanderers	17	0
5	Callum Doyle (on loan)	(England)	CB	3 October 2003 (aged 20)	2023	2024	(England) Manchester City	23	0
15	Harry Souttar	(Australia)	CB	22 October 1998 (aged 25)	2023	2028	(England) Stoke City	16	0
21	Ricardo Pereira	(Portugal)	RB	6 October 1993 (aged 30)	2018	2026	(Portugal) Porto	169	13
23	Jannik Vestergaard	(Denmark)	CB	3 August 1992 (aged 31)	2021	2024	(England) Southampton	67	2
45	Ben Nelson	(England)	CB	18 March 2004 (aged 20)	2020	2027	Youth Academy	8	1
Midfielders
8	Harry Winks	(England)	CM	2 February 1996 (aged 28)	2023	2026	(England) Tottenham Hotspur	48	2
11	Marc Albrighton	(England)	RW / LW / RWB / LWB	18 November 1989 (aged 34)	2015	2024	(England) Aston Villa	313	19
17	Hamza Choudhury	(England)	DM / RB / LB	1 October 1997 (aged 26)	2015	2027	Youth Academy	125	2
22	Kiernan Dewsbury-Hall	(England)	CM	6 September 1998 (aged 25)	2017	2027	Youth Academy	129	17
25	Wilfred Ndidi	(Nigeria)	DM / CM	16 December 1996 (aged 27)	2017	2024	(Belgium) Genk	273	17
26	Dennis Praet	(Belgium)	CM / AM	14 May 1994 (aged 30)	2019	2024	(Italy) Sampdoria	107	5
35	Kasey McAteer	(England)	AM / RW	22 November 2001 (aged 22)	2021	2025	Youth Academy	30	7
37	Will Alves	(England)	AM	4 May 2005 (aged 19)	2022	–	Youth Academy	2	0
47	Arjan Raikhy	(England)	CM	20 October 2002 (aged 21)	2023	–	Youth Academy	3	0
58	Brandon Cover	(England)	DM	25 September 2003 (aged 20)	2024	–	Youth Academy	1	0
Attackers
9	Jamie Vardy	(England)	ST	11 January 1987 (aged 37)	2012	2024	(England) Fleetwood Town	464	190
10	Stephy Mavididi	(England)	LW	31 May 1998 (aged 26)	2023	2028	(France) Montpellier	48	13
14	Kelechi Iheanacho	(Nigeria)	ST	3 October 1996 (aged 27)	2017	2024	(England) Manchester City	232	61
18	Abdul Fatawu (on loan)	(Ghana)	RW / LW / AM	8 March 2004 (aged 20)	2023	2024	(Portugal) Sporting CP	43	7
20	Patson Daka	(Zambia)	ST	9 October 1998 (aged 25)	2021	2026	(Austria) Red Bull Salzburg	96	22
28	Tom Cannon	(Republic of Ireland)	ST	28 December 2002 (aged 21)	2023	2028	(England) Everton	16	3
29	Yunus Akgün (on loan)	(Turkey)	RW / AM	7 July 2000 (aged 23)	2023	2024	(Turkey) Galatasaray	29	2
39	Tawanda Maswanhise	(Zimbabwe)	LW	20 November 2002 (aged 21)	2021	2024	Youth Academy	1	0
40	Wanya Marçal	(Portugal)	LW / RW	19 October 2002 (aged 21)	2022	2026	Youth Academy	9	1
Out on loan
16	Victor Kristiansen	(Denmark)	LB	16 December 2002 (aged 21)	2023	2028	(Denmark) Copenhagen	14	0
24	Boubakary Soumaré	(France)	DM	27 February 1999 (aged 25)	2021	2026	(France) Lille	60	0
31	Daniel Iversen	(Denmark)	GK	19 January 1997 (aged 27)	2018	2025	Youth Academy	17	0
33	Luke Thomas	(England)	LB	10 June 2001 (aged 23)	2020	2026	Youth Academy	85	2

== Transfers ==
=== In ===
Date	Position	Nationality	Player	From	Fee	Team	Ref.
1 July 2023	CM	(England)	Harry Winks	(England) Tottenham Hotspur	£10,000,000	First team	
1 July 2023	CB	(England)	Conor Coady	(England) Wolverhampton Wanderers	£8,500,000	First team	
18 July 2023	GK	(Denmark)	Mads Hermansen	(Denmark) Brøndby	£6,500,000	First team	
31 July 2023	LW	(England)	Stephy Mavididi	(France) Montpellier	£6,400,000	First team	
17 August 2023	CM	(England)	Arjan Raikhy	(England) Aston Villa	Free transfer	Academy	
1 September 2023	ST	(Republic of Ireland)	Tom Cannon	(England) Everton	£7,500,000	First team	

=== Out ===
Date	Position	Nationality	Player	To	Fee	Team	Ref.
28 June 2023	AM	(England)	James Maddison	(England) Tottenham Hotspur	£40,000,000	First team	
30 June 2023	RB / CB	(Ghana)	Daniel Amartey	(Turkey) Beşiktaş	End of contract	First team	
30 June 2023	LB	(England)	Ryan Bertrand	End of contract		First team	
30 June 2023	GK	(England)	Kelechi Chibueze	(England) Sunderland	Released	Academy	
30 June 2023	CF	(Belgium)	Josh Eppiah	(Brazil) Amazonas	Released	Academy	
30 June 2023	CB	(Northern Ireland)	Jonny Evans	(England) Manchester United	End of contract	First team	
30 June 2023	MF	(South Africa)	Khanya Leshabela	(South Africa) Cape Town City	Released	Academy	
30 June 2023	DM	(Senegal)	Nampalys Mendy	(France) Lens	End of contract	First team	
30 June 2023	CB	(England)	Ronny Nelson	(England) Colchester United	Released	Academy	
30 June 2023	FW	(England)	Terell Pennant	(England) Coalville Town	Released	Academy	
30 June 2023	SS / RW / AM	(Spain)	Ayoze Pérez	(Spain) Real Betis	End of contract	First team	
30 June 2023	CB	(Turkey)	Çağlar Söyüncü	(Spain) Atlético Madrid	End of contract	First team	
30 June 2023	CB	(Guyana)	Bayli Spencer-Adams	Released		Academy	
30 June 2023	MF	(Thailand)	Thanawat Suengchitthawon	(Thailand) Muangthong United	Released	Academy	
30 June 2023	CM	(Belgium)	Youri Tielemans	(England) Aston Villa	End of contract	First team	
6 July 2023	CB	(England)	Freddie Cook	(Wales) Cardiff City	Released	Academy	
13 July 2023	CF	(England)	George Hirst	(England) Ipswich Town	Undisclosed	Academy	
23 July 2023	LW	(England)	Harvey Barnes	(England) Newcastle United	£38,000,000	First team	
2 August 2023	GK	(United States)	Chituru Odunze	(United States) Crown Legacy	Undisclosed	Academy	
29 August 2023	RB / LB	(Belgium)	Timothy Castagne	(England) Fulham	£15,000,000	First team	
4 January 2024	AM	(England)	Ethan Fitzhugh	(England) Banbury United	Undisclosed	Academy	
22 January 2024	GK	(England)	Alex Smithies	Retired		First team	

=== Loans in ===
Date	Position	Nationality	Player	From	Date until	Team	Ref.
14 July 2023	CB	(England)	Callum Doyle	(England) Manchester City	End of season	First team	
15 August 2023	CM / AM	(Italy)	Cesare Casadei	(England) Chelsea	19 January 2024 (Note: On 19 January, Casadei was recalled by Chelsea from his season-long loan.)	First team	
26 August 2023	RW / AM	(Turkey)	Yunus Akgün	(Turkey) Galatasaray	End of season	First team	
31 August 2023	AM / RW	(Ghana)	Abdul Fatawu	(Portugal) Sporting CP	End of season	First team	

=== Loans out ===
Date	Position	Nationality	Player	To	Date until	Team	Ref.
1 July 2023	CF	(Ghana)	Nathan Opoku	(Belgium) OH Leuven	End of season	Academy	
25 August 2023	CB / RB	(England)	Lewis Brunt	(England) Mansfield Town	End of season	Academy	
30 August 2023	LB	(Denmark)	Victor Kristiansen	(Italy) Bologna	End of season	First team	
31 August 2023	LB	(England)	Luke Thomas	(England) Sheffield United	12 January 2024 (Note: On 12 January, Thomas returned back early from his season-long loan at Sheffield United.)	First team	
1 September 2023	CM	(United States)	Zach Booth	(Netherlands) Volendam	End of season	Academy	
1 September 2023	DM	(France)	Boubakary Soumaré	(Spain) Sevilla	End of season	First team	
2 November 2023	CM	(England)	Jack Lewis	(England) Basford United	1 January 2024	Academy	
25 November 2023	CB	(Netherlands)	Paul Appiah	(England) Maidstone United	25 January 2024 (Note: On 3 January, Appiah's loan at Maidstone was extended by a further three weeks.)	Academy	
5 January 2024	GK	(Denmark)	Daniel Iversen	(England) Stoke City	End of season	First team	
26 January 2024	LB	(England)	Luke Thomas	(England) Middlesbrough	End of season	First team	

== Pre-season and friendlies ==
Leicester City announced that they would embark on a South East Asia tour as part of their pre-season preparations. The club played domestic friendlies against Peterborough United and Northampton Town, as well as a friendly against its sister club, OH Leuven, behind closed doors. Leicester were due to play against Tottenham Hotspur on 23 July 2023 in Bangkok, Thailand, before the match was cancelled due to poor weather conditions. Leicester played against Liverpool in the Standard Chartered Singapore Trophy in Singapore on 30 July 2023.

Win Draw Loss Fixtures

11 July 2023 Friendly	Leicester City	1–2	Peterborough United	Leicester
12:00 BST	Pereira 39'	Report	Poku 4'; Tomlinson 83'	Stadium: Leicester City Training Ground; Attendance: 0 (Behind closed doors)

15 July 2023 Friendly	Northampton Town	0–1	Leicester City	Northampton
15:00 BST		Report	Dewsbury-Hall 27'	Stadium: Sixfields Stadium; Attendance: 7,765; Referee: Dean Whitestone

19 July 2023 Friendly	Leicester City	4–2	OH Leuven	Leicester
11:00 BST	Vardy 9'; Praet 63'; Albrighton 91'; McAteer 126'	Report	Banzuzi; Nsingi	Stadium: Leicester City Training Ground; Attendance: 0 (Behind closed doors)
Note: Match was played in three periods of 45 minutes each.

23 July 2023 Friendly	Leicester City	Cancelled	Tottenham Hotspur	Bangkok, Thailand
17:00 ICT (UTC+7)
Note: Match was cancelled due to poor weather conditions.

26 July 2023 Friendly	Port	0–1	Leicester City	Bangkok, Thailand
ICT (UTC+7)		Report	Ndidi 7'	Attendance: 0 (Behind closed doors)

30 July 2023 Singapore Trophy	Liverpool	4–0	Leicester City	Kallang, Singapore
17:00 SST (UTC+8)	Núñez 30'; Clark 35'; Jota 38'; Doak 64'	Report	Castagne (yellow card) 66'	Stadium: Singapore National Stadium; Attendance: 28,597; Referee: Farhad Bin Mohamed (Singapore)

== Competitions ==
=== Overall record ===
Competition	First match	Last match	Starting round	Final position	Record							
Competition	First match	Last match	Starting round	Final position	Pld	W	D	L	GF	GA	GD	Win %
Championship	6 August 2023	4 May 2024	Matchday 1	Winners	46	31	4	11	89	41	+48	67.39
FA Cup	6 January 2024	17 March 2024	Third round	Quarter-finals	4	3	0	1	9	6	+3	75.00
EFL Cup	9 August 2023	27 September 2023	First round	Third round	3	2	0	1	5	3	+2	66.67
Total					53	36	4	13	103	50	+53	67.92

Source: Soccerway

=== EFL Championship ===
==== League table ====
Pos	Team	Pld	W	D	L	GF	GA	GD	Pts	Promotion, qualification or relegation
1	Leicester City (C, P)	46	31	4	11	89	41	+48	97	Promoted to the Premier League
2	Ipswich Town (P)	46	28	12	6	92	57	+35	96	Promoted to the Premier League
3	Leeds United	46	27	9	10	81	43	+38	90	Qualified for the Championship play-offs
4	Southampton (O, P)	46	26	9	11	87	63	+24	87	Qualified for the Championship play-offs
5	West Bromwich Albion	46	21	12	13	70	47	+23	75	Qualified for the Championship play-offs
6	Norwich City	46	21	10	15	79	64	+15	73	Qualified for the Championship play-offs

Source: EFL official website
Rules for classification: 1) Points; 2) Goal difference; 3) Number of goals scored; 4) Head-to-head results; 5) Wins; 6) Away goals; 7) Penalty points (sec 9.5); 8) Number of 12-point sending off offences; 9) Play-off (only if needed to determine promotion/relegation)
(C) Champions; (O) Play-off winners; (P) Promoted

==== Results summary ====
Overall								Home						Away					
Pld	W	D	L	GF	GA	GD	Pts	W	D	L	GF	GA	GD	W	D	L	GF	GA	GD
46	31	4	11	89	41	+48	97	17	1	5	47	18	+29	14	3	6	42	23	+19

Source: Soccerway

==== Results by round ====
Round	1	2	3	4	5	6	7	8	9	10	11	12	13	14	15	16	17	18	19	20	21	22	23	24	25	26	27	28	29	30	31	32	33	34	35	36	37	39	40	41	42	43	44	38^{1}	45	46
Ground	H	A	H	A	H	A	A	H	A	H	H	A	H	A	H	A	H	A	A	H	H	A	H	A	A	H	A	H	H	A	A	H	H	A	H	A	A	A	H	H	A	A	H	H	A	H
Result	W	W	W	W	L	W	W	W	W	W	W	W	W	W	L	L	W	D	W	W	W	W	W	D	W	W	L	D	W	W	W	W	L	L	L	W	D	L	W	W	L	L	W	W	W	L
Position	6	2	2	1	3	2	2	1	1	1	1	1	1	1	1	1	1	1	1	1	1	1	1	1	1	1	1	1	1	1	1	1	1	1	1	1	1	3	3	1	1	2	1	1	1	1

Source: Soccerway
A = Away; H = Home; W = Win; D = Draw; L = Loss; P = Postponed
Notes:
- ^{1} Matchday 38 (vs Southampton) was postponed due to Leicester's FA Cup involvement.

==== Matches ====
The Championship fixtures were released on 22 June 2023.

Win Draw Loss Fixtures

6 August 2023 1	Leicester City	2–1	Coventry City	Leicester
12:00 BST	Vestergaard (yellow card) 52'; Doyle (yellow card) 68'; Dewsbury-Hall 77', 87', (yellow card) 90+2'	Report	McFadzean 47'; Sheaf (yellow card) 89'; Palmer (yellow card) 90'	Stadium: King Power Stadium; Attendance: 31,763; Referee: Darren Bond

12 August 2023 2	Huddersfield Town	0–1	Leicester City	Huddersfield
15:00 BST	Pearson (yellow card) 54'	Report	Dewsbury-Hall (yellow card) 16'; Vestergaard (yellow card) 23'; Pereira (yellow card) 48'; Mavididi 73'; Winks (yellow card) 90+2'	Stadium: Kirklees Stadium; Attendance: 19,541; Referee: David Webb

19 August 2023 3	Leicester City	2–1	Cardiff City	Leicester
15:00 BST	Mavididi (yellow card) 5'; Marçal 36'; Casadei 90+2'	Report	Ramsey (yellow card) 19', (goal) 45+1'; Goutas (yellow card) 57'; Collins (yellow card) 87'; Simpson (yellow card) 90+1'; Romeo (yellow card) 90+4' (yellow-red card) 90+6'	Stadium: King Power Stadium; Attendance: 31,595; Referee: Graham Scott

26 August 2023 4	Rotherham United	1–2	Leicester City	Rotherham
15:00 BST	Onyedinma 53'; Humphreys (yellow card) 89'	Report	McAteer 12', 84'; Hermansen (yellow card) 90+2'	Stadium: New York Stadium; Attendance: 11,418; Referee: Simon Hooper

2 September 2023 5	Leicester City	0–1	Hull City	Leicester
15:00 BST	Winks (yellow card) 55'; Vestergaard (yellow card) 58'; Fatawu (yellow card) 90+4'	Report	Jones (yellow card) 2'; Coyle (yellow card) 7'; Delap 15', (yellow card) 40'; Vinagre (yellow card) 60'; Greaves (yellow card) 75'; Sayyadmanesh (yellow card) 90+1'	Stadium: King Power Stadium; Attendance: 31,318; Referee: John Busby

15 September 2023 6	Southampton	1–4	Leicester City	Southampton
20:00 BST	Edozie 25'; Smallbone (yellow card) 32'; Manning (yellow card) 73'; Sulemana (red card) 90+7'	Report	Vardy 1'; McAteer 18'; Dewsbury-Hall (yellow card) 39'; Ndidi 45+3'; Winks (yellow card) 51'; Mavididi 67'; Fatawu (yellow card) 73'; Akgün (yellow card) 90+2'	Stadium: St Mary's Stadium; Attendance: 28,877; Referee: Bobby Madley

20 September 2023 7	Norwich City	0–2	Leicester City	Norwich
20:00 BST	Duffy (yellow card) 39'; Gibson (yellow card) 42'; Barnes (yellow card) 43'	Report	McAteer (yellow card) 35', (goal) 87'; Iheanacho 45' (pen.); Vardy (yellow card) 70'; Winks (yellow card) 71'; Vestergaard (yellow card) 90'	Stadium: Carrow Road; Attendance: 26,277; Referee: Graham Scott

23 September 2023 8	Leicester City	1–0	Bristol City	Leicester
15:00 BST	Faes (yellow card) 62'; Vardy 67' (pen.)	Report	Williams (yellow card) 51'; Knight (yellow card) 53'	Stadium: King Power Stadium; Attendance: 31,679; Referee: James Bell

1 October 2023 9	Blackburn Rovers	1–4	Leicester City	Blackburn
12:00 BST	Szmodics 9'; Carter (yellow card) 48'; Wharton (yellow card) 70'	Report	Faes 4'; Fatawu (yellow card) 15'; Vardy 28'; Mavididi (yellow card) 30'; Vestergaard (yellow card) 46'; Iheanacho 82' (pen.); Dewsbury-Hall 88'	Stadium: Ewood Park; Attendance: 15,937; Referee: James Linington

4 October 2023 10	Leicester City	3–0	Preston North End	Leicester
19:45 BST	Dewsbury-Hall 60', 90'; Iheanacho 76'	Report	Woodburn (yellow card) 82'; Stewart (yellow card) 86'	Stadium: King Power Stadium; Attendance: 30,380; Referee: Thomas Bramall

7 October 2023 11	Leicester City	2–0	Stoke City	Leicester
15:00 BST	Iheanacho 24'; Vestergaard (yellow card) 26'; Vardy 79'	Report	Burger (yellow card) 32'	Stadium: King Power Stadium; Attendance: 31,589; Referee: Geoff Eltringham

21 October 2023 12	Swansea City	1–3	Leicester City	Swansea
15:00 BST	Cullen (yellow card) 14'; Grimes 20'	Report	Vestergaard 44'; Justin (yellow card) 49'; Pereira (yellow card) 56'; Fatawu 63'; Iheanacho 87'; Dewsbury-Hall (yellow card) 90+8'	Stadium: Swansea.com Stadium; Attendance: 18,509; Referee: Anthony Backhouse

24 October 2023 13	Leicester City	1–0	Sunderland	Leicester
20:00 BST	Justin 12'; Iheanacho (yellow card) 40'; Vestergaard (yellow card) 50'; Justin (yellow card) 68'; Pereira (yellow card) 72'	Report	O'Nien (yellow card) 50'; Hume (yellow card) 54'; Cirkin (yellow card) 71'	Stadium: King Power Stadium; Attendance: 30,951; Referee: Keith Stroud

28 October 2023 14	Queens Park Rangers	1–2	Leicester City	White City
15:00 BST	Dozzell 40', (yellow card) 59' (yellow-red card) 59'; Colback (yellow card) 66'	Report	Mavididi 30'; Fatawu (yellow card) 59'; Winks 80'; Pereira (yellow card) 90+2'	Stadium: Loftus Road; Attendance: 17,385; Referee: Leigh Doughty

3 November 2023 15	Leicester City	0–1	Leeds United	Leicester
20:00 GMT	Choudhury (yellow card) 89'	Report	Byram (yellow card) 26'; Rutter 58'; Summerville (yellow card) 88'	Stadium: King Power Stadium; Attendance: 32,011; Referee: Dean Whitestone

11 November 2023 16	Middlesbrough	1–0	Leicester City	Middlesbrough
15:00 GMT	Crooks (yellow card) 42'; Greenwood 83'; Howson (yellow card) 85'; Jones (yellow card) 88'; Rogers (yellow card) 90+3'	Report	Vestergaard (yellow card) 12'; Winks (yellow card) 43'; Choudhury (yellow card) 82'	Stadium: Riverside Stadium; Attendance: 30,042; Referee: Oliver Langford

25 November 2023 17	Leicester City	2–0	Watford	Leicester
15:00 GMT	Ndidi (yellow card) 62'; Vardy (yellow card) 68', (goal) 76', 90+5' (pen.)	Report	Louza (yellow card) 30'; Porteous (yellow card) 54'; Chakvetadze (yellow card) 72'; Kayembe (yellow card) 75'; Bachmann (yellow card) 83' (yellow-red card) 90+3'; Asprilla (yellow card) 90'	Stadium: King Power Stadium; Attendance: 31,577; Referee: Sam Allison

29 November 2023 18	Sheffield Wednesday	1–1	Leicester City	Sheffield
19:45 GMT	Famewo (yellow card) 20'; Bannan (yellow card) 57'; Hendrick 90+3'	Report	Fatawu 23'; Vestergaard (yellow card) 35'	Stadium: Hillsborough; Attendance: 26,036; Referee: Sam Barrott

2 December 2023 19	West Bromwich Albion	1–2	Leicester City	West Bromwich
12:30 GMT	Mowatt (yellow card) 63'; Yokuslu (yellow card) 74'; Maja 89'	Report	Pereira (yellow card) 66'; Dewsbury-Hall 72'; Winks 90+4'	Stadium: The Hawthorns; Attendance: 24,382; Referee: Tim Robinson

9 December 2023 20	Leicester City	4–0	Plymouth Argyle	Leicester
15:00 GMT	Mavididi 14' (pen.), 52'; Daka 49'; Ndidi 55'	Report	Gibson (yellow card) 42'; Miller (yellow card) 44'; Galloway (yellow card) 67'	Stadium: King Power Stadium; Attendance: 31,265; Referee: Sunny Sukhvir Gill

13 December 2023 21	Leicester City	3–2	Millwall	Leicester
19:45 GMT	Coady (yellow card) 37'; Vestergaard 48'; Daka 52'; Pereira 78'; Faes (yellow card) 82'	Report	Bradshaw 10'; Harding (yellow card) 13'; Cooper (yellow card) 21'; Wallace (yellow card) 24'; Saville (yellow card) 74'; Nisbet 90+3'	Stadium: King Power Stadium; Attendance: 28,960; Referee: Keith Stroud

18 December 2023 22	Birmingham City	2–3	Leicester City	Birmingham
20:00 GMT	James 14', 74'	Report	Mavididi 10', 50', (yellow card) 10'; Dewsbury-Hall 21'	Stadium: St Andrew's; Attendance: 20,334; Referee: David Webb

23 December 2023 23	Leicester City	3–0	Rotherham United	Leicester
15:00 GMT	Fatawu (yellow card) 45'; Daka 60', 65'; Casadei 72'	Report	Johansson (yellow card) 65'	Stadium: King Power Stadium; Attendance: 31,175; Referee: Darren Bond

26 December 2023 24	Ipswich Town	1–1	Leicester City	Ipswich
19:45 GMT	Harness (yellow card) 61'; Vestergaard 90+3' (o.g.)	Report	Mavididi 25'; Ndidi (yellow card) 54'; Pereira (yellow card) 59'	Stadium: Portman Road; Attendance: 29,410; Referee: Sam Barrott

29 December 2023 25	Cardiff City	0–2	Leicester City	Cardiff
19:45 GMT	Ralls (yellow card) 47'	Report	Dewsbury-Hall 18'; Justin 55'	Stadium: Cardiff City Stadium; Attendance: 24,656; Referee: John Busby

1 January 2024 26	Leicester City	4–1	Huddersfield Town	Leicester
15:00 GMT	Cannon 40', 61'; Pereira 47'; Mavididi 77'	Report	Helik 63'; Ayina (yellow card) 76'	Stadium: King Power Stadium; Attendance: 30,407; Referee: Sam Allison

13 January 2024 27	Coventry City	3–1	Leicester City	Coventry
12:30 GMT	Palmer (yellow card) 37'; Thomas (yellow card) 43'; Sakamoto (yellow card) 43'; O'Hare 78', 90+4'; Van Ewijk 88', (yellow card) 90+4'; Dasilva (yellow card) 90+3'	Report	Dewsbury-Hall 44' (pen.); Fatawu (red card) 45+2'; Winks (yellow card) 78'; Cannon (yellow card) 83'; Casadei (yellow card) 84'	Stadium: Coventry Building Society Arena; Attendance: 29,914; Referee: Darren England

22 January 2024 28	Leicester City	1–1	Ipswich Town	Leicester
20:00 GMT	Davis 31' (o.g.); Pereira (yellow card) 84'	Report	Travis (yellow card) 59'; Luongo (yellow card) 65'; Clarke (yellow card) 69'; Sarmiento 89'	Stadium: King Power Stadium; Attendance: 31,794; Referee: Joshua Smith

30 January 2024 29	Leicester City	3–1	Swansea City	Leicester
19:45 GMT	Dewsbury-Hall 3', (yellow card) 55'; Mavididi 69' (pen.); Akgün 72'	Report	Wood (yellow card) 68'; Allen 90+5'	Stadium: King Power Stadium; Attendance: 28,025; Referee: Keith Stroud
Note: Fixture was originally scheduled for 27 January, but was postponed due to both club's progression in the FA Cup.

3 February 2024 30	Stoke City	0–5	Leicester City	Stoke-on-Trent
15:00 GMT	Leris (yellow card) 26'; Bae (yellow card) 47'; Wilmot (yellow card) 90'; Rose (yellow card) 90+7'	Report	Daka 26', 66' (pen.); McAteer 30', (yellow card) 40'; Mavididi (yellow card) 42'; Vardy 73', 90+8' (pen.); Justin (yellow card) 90+5'	Stadium: bet365 Stadium; Attendance: 22,657; Referee: Lewis Smith

10 February 2024 31	Watford	1–2	Leicester City	Watford
15:00 GMT	Dennis 63'; Porteous (yellow card) 75'; Hoedt (yellow card) 90+5'	Report	Daka 11' (pen.); Winks (yellow card) 37'; Nelson (yellow card) 50'; Pereira 55'; Vardy (yellow card) 90+5'	Stadium: Vicarage Road; Attendance: 20,597; Referee: Oliver Langford

13 February 2024 32	Leicester City	2–0	Sheffield Wednesday	Leicester
19:45 GMT	Fatawu 4'; Vardy 36'; Winks (yellow card) 76'	Report	Ihiekwe (yellow card) 6'; Bernard (yellow card) 64'	Stadium: King Power Stadium; Attendance: 31,550; Referee: Tom Nield

17 February 2024 33	Leicester City	1–2	Middlesbrough	Leicester
15:00 GMT	Faes (yellow card) 60'; Vardy 85'	Report	Clarke (yellow card) 3'; Azaz 24'; Silvera 37'; Glover (yellow card) 59'; McGree (yellow card) 73'; Ayling (yellow card) 81'	Stadium: King Power Stadium; Attendance: 31,487; Referee: Chris Kavanagh

23 February 2024 34	Leeds United	3–1	Leicester City	Leeds
20:00 GMT	Rodon (yellow card) 45+3'; Ampadu (yellow card) 52'; Kamara (yellow card) 75'; Roberts 80', (yellow card) 87'; Gray 83'; Meslier (yellow card) 88'; James 90+4'	Report	Faes 15'; Pereira (yellow card) 19'; Vestergaard (yellow card) 90+3'	Stadium: Elland Road; Attendance: 36,954; Referee: Craig Pawson
Note: Fixture was originally scheduled for 24 February, but was moved to a day earlier for live Sky Sports coverage.

2 March 2024 35	Leicester City	1–2	Queens Park Rangers	Leicester
15:00 GMT	Nelson 60', (yellow card) 90+1'; Choudhury (yellow card) 84'	Report	Chair 38'; Andersen (yellow card) 43'; Dykes (yellow card) 54'; Armstrong 57'; Cook (yellow card) 90+4'	Stadium: King Power Stadium; Attendance: 31,439; Referee: Andy Davies

5 March 2024 36	Sunderland	0–1	Leicester City	Sunderland
19:45 GMT	O'Nien (yellow card) 55'	Report	Vardy 13'; Hermansen (yellow card) 68'; Dewsbury-Hall (yellow card) 81'; Ndidi (yellow card) 90'	Stadium: Stadium of Light; Attendance: 40,293; Referee: Sunny Sukhvir Gill

9 March 2024 37	Hull City	2–2	Leicester City	Kingston upon Hull
15:00 GMT	Carvalho 16'; Greaves (yellow card) 38'; Zaroury 60'; Seri (yellow card) 70'	Report	Vardy (yellow card) 25', (goal) 31' (pen.), 62'; Faes (yellow card) 45+2'	Stadium: MKM Stadium; Attendance: 24,605; Referee: Sam Barrott

29 March 2024 39	Bristol City	1–0	Leicester City	Bristol
12:30 GMT	Mehmeti 73'; Wells (yellow card) 82'; Sykes (yellow card) 88'	Report		Stadium: Ashton Gate Stadium; Attendance: 25,857; Referee: Andrew Kitchen
Note: Fixture was initially scheduled for 15:00 kick-off, but was moved for live Sky Sports broadcasting.

1 April 2024 40	Leicester City	3–1	Norwich City	Leicester
12:30 BST	Dewsbury-Hall 33'; Mavididi 61'; Vestergaard (yellow card) 65'; Vardy 90+3'	Report	Sara 20'; Duffy (yellow card) 35'	Stadium: King Power Stadium; Attendance: 31,825; Referee: Darren Bond
Note: Fixture was initially scheduled for 15:00 kick-off, but was moved for live Sky Sports broadcasting.

6 April 2024 41	Leicester City	2–1	Birmingham City	Leicester
15:00 BST	Dewsbury-Hall 28'; Faes (yellow card) 34'; Mavididi 87', (yellow card) 89'	Report	James (yellow card) 19'; Stansfield 45'; Bielik (yellow card) 57'	Stadium: King Power Stadium; Attendance: 31,825; Referee: David Webb

9 April 2024 42	Millwall	1–0	Leicester City	Bermondsey
19:45 BST	Honeyman (yellow card) 11'; Longman 59'; Saville (yellow card) 83'; Sarkic (yellow card) 90+6'	Report	Winks (yellow card) 21'	Stadium: The Den; Attendance: 14,889; Referee: Sunny Sukhvir Gill
Note: Fixture was selected for live Sky Sports broadcast.

12 April 2024 43	Plymouth Argyle	1–0	Leicester City	Plymouth
20:00 BST	Bundu 21'; Miller (yellow card) 30'; Forshaw (yellow card) 41'; Hardie (yellow card) 49'; Whittaker (yellow card) 50'; Waine (yellow card) 90+1'	Report	Ndidi (yellow card) 45+4'; Vestergaard (yellow card) 69'	Stadium: Home Park; Attendance: 16,861; Referee: Robert Jones
Note: Fixture was initially scheduled for 13 April, but was moved for live Sky Sports broadcast.

20 April 2024 44	Leicester City	2–1	West Bromwich Albion	Leicester
12:30 BST	Ndidi 22', (yellow card) 90+4'; Vardy 65'; Choudhury (yellow card) 85'; Daka (yellow card) 88'	Report	M'Vila (yellow card) 24'; Wallace 76'; Kipré (yellow card) 90+8'	Stadium: King Power Stadium; Attendance: 31,874; Referee: Thomas Bramall
Note: Fixture was initially scheduled for a 15:00 kick-off, but was moved for live Sky Sports coverage.

23 April 2024 38	Leicester City	5–0	Southampton	Leicester
20:00 BST	Fatawu 25', 75', 81'; Ndidi 62'; Vestergaard (yellow card) 66'; Vardy 79'	Report		Stadium: King Power Stadium; Attendance: 31,872; Referee: Bobby Madley
Note: Fixture was originally scheduled for 16 March, but was postponed due to Leicester's progression in the FA Cup.

29 April 2024 45	Preston North End	0–3	Leicester City	Preston
20:00 BST	Browne (yellow card) 46'; Hughes (yellow card) 54'; Brady (yellow card) 62'; Holmes (yellow card) 90+1'	Report	Vardy 36', 52'; McAteer 67'	Stadium: Deepdale; Attendance: 19,641; Referee: Sam Allison
Note: Fixture was initially scheduled for 27 April, but was moved for live Sky Sports broadcasting.

4 May 2024 46	Leicester City	0–2	Blackburn Rovers	Leicester
12:30 BST	Fatawu (yellow card) 36'; Justin (yellow card) 58'	Report	Szmodics 68', 90+4', (yellow card) 69'; Rankin-Costello (yellow card) 86'	Stadium: King Power Stadium; Attendance: 32,117; Referee: Andrew Kitchen

=== FA Cup ===
Leicester City entered the FA Cup in the third round, and won away to Millwall. Leicester then won at home against Birmingham City in the fourth round, and won away to Bournemouth in the fifth round. Leicester were knocked out of the competition after losing in an away game to Chelsea in the quarter-finals.

Win Draw Loss Fixtures

6 January 2024 Third round	Millwall	2–3	Leicester City	Bermondsey
12:30 GMT	Wartmore 56'; Flemming (yellow card) 69', (goal) 86'	Report	Casadei 16'; Pereira 39'; Cannon 61', (yellow card) 90+3'	Stadium: The Den; Attendance: 10,092; Referee: Oliver Langford

27 January 2024 Fourth round	Leicester City	3–0	Birmingham City	Leicester
15:00 GMT	Vardy 47'; Akgün 72'; Praet 88'	Report	T. Roberts (yellow card) 65'; M. Roberts (yellow card) 77'	Stadium: King Power Stadium; Attendance: 28,396; Referee: Craig Pawson

27 February 2024 Fifth round	Bournemouth	0–1 (a.e.t.)	Leicester City	Bournemouth
19:30 GMT	Ünal (yellow card) 35'; Senesi (yellow card) 57'; Scott (yellow card) 87'; Kluivert (yellow card) 109'	Report	Raikhy (yellow card) 37'; Doyle (yellow card) 51'; Fatawu (yellow card) 96', (goal) 105'; Pereira (yellow card) 112'; Justin (yellow card) 115'	Stadium: Vitality Stadium; Attendance: 10,872; Referee: Paul Tierney

17 March 2024 Quarter-finals	Chelsea	4–2	Leicester City	Fulham
12:45 GMT	Cucurella 13'; Palmer 45+1'; Chukwuemeka 90+2'; Madueke 90+8'	Report	Disasi 51' (o.g.); Mavididi 62', (yellow card) 67'; Doyle (red card) 73'; Coady (yellow card) 90+6'	Stadium: Stamford Bridge; Attendance: 39,589; Referee: Andrew Madley

=== EFL Cup ===
In August, Leicester progressed through the first and second rounds of the cup, winning away to both Burton Albion and Tranmere Rovers. Leicester were knocked out of the competition away to eventual winner Liverpool in the third round.

Win Draw Loss Fixtures

9 August 2023 First round	Burton Albion	0–2	Leicester City	Burton upon Trent
20:00 BST		Report	Iheanacho 6'; Ndidi 45+2'	Stadium: Pirelli Stadium; Attendance: 4,631; Referee: Gavin Ward

29 August 2023 Second round	Tranmere Rovers	0–2	Leicester City	Birkenhead
19:45 BST	Davies (yellow card) 64'; Jennings (yellow card) 62'	Report	Ndidi 55'; Vardy 59'; Faes (yellow card) 65'	Stadium: Prenton Park; Attendance: 6,610; Referee: Ben Toner

27 September 2023 Third round	Liverpool	3–1	Leicester City	Liverpool
19:45 BST	Gakpo 48'; Szoboszlai 70'; Endō (yellow card) 86'; Jota 89'	Report	McAteer 3'; Pereira (yellow card) 23'; Choudhury (yellow card) 45+2'	Stadium: Anfield; Attendance: 49,732; Referee: Tim Robinson

== Squad statistics ==
=== Appearances ===
Last updated: 11 May 2024

- Italics indicate a loaned in player

No.	Pos	Nat	Player	Total		Championship		FA Cup		EFL Cup	
No.	Pos	Nat	Player	Apps	Goals	Apps	Goals	Apps	Goals	Apps	Goals
1	GK	(Wales)	Danny Ward	0	0	0	0	0	0	0	0
2	DF	(England)	James Justin	45	2	27+12	2	0+3	0	3	0
3	DF	(Belgium)	Wout Faes	45	2	42	2	1	0	2	0
4	DF	(England)	Conor Coady	18	0	9+4	0	3+1	0	1	0
5	DF	(England)	Callum Doyle	22	0	13+3	0	4	0	2	0
8	MF	(England)	Harry Winks	48	2	45	2	1	0	2	0
9	FW	(England)	Jamie Vardy	37	20	18+17	18	1	1	1	1
10	FW	(England)	Stephy Mavididi	48	13	42+4	12	1	1	1	0
11	MF	(England)	Marc Albrighton	18	0	0+12	0	3	0	3	0
14	FW	(Nigeria)	Kelechi Iheanacho	26	6	10+13	5	0+1	0	2	1
15	DF	(Australia)	Harry Souttar	4	0	1+2	0	0	0	1	0
17	MF	(England)	Hamza Choudhury	41	0	15+19	0	4	0	3	0
18	MF	(Ghana)	Abdul Fatawu	43	7	33+7	6	2	1	0+1	0
20	FW	(Zambia)	Patson Daka	22	7	15+5	7	1	0	0+1	0
21	DF	(Portugal)	Ricardo Pereira	45	4	37+2	3	1+2	1	1+2	0
22	MF	(England)	Kiernan Dewsbury-Hall	49	12	41+3	12	1+1	0	1+2	0
23	DF	(Denmark)	Jannik Vestergaard	42	2	40	2	2	0	0	0
25	MF	(Nigeria)	Wilfred Ndidi	36	6	26+6	4	1	0	1+2	2
26	MF	(Belgium)	Dennis Praet	20	1	6+11	0	2	1	1	0
28	FW	(Republic of Ireland)	Tom Cannon	16	3	3+10	2	2+1	1	0	0
29	FW	(Turkey)	Yunus Akgün	29	2	9+14	1	3+1	1	1+1	0
30	GK	(Denmark)	Mads Hermansen	44	0	44	0	0	0	0	0
35	MF	(England)	Kasey McAteer	26	7	13+10	6	0+1	0	1+1	1
37	MF	(England)	Will Alves	0	0	0	0	0	0	0	0
39	MF	(Zimbabwe)	Tawanda Maswanhise	1	0	0	0	0+1	0	0	0
40	FW	(Portugal)	Wanya Marçal	8	1	2+1	1	3	0	1+1	0
41	GK	(Poland)	Jakub Stolarczyk	9	0	2	0	4	0	3	0
45	DF	(England)	Ben Nelson	9	1	2+3	1	2+1	0	0+1	0
47	MF	(England)	Arjan Raikhy	3	0	0+1	0	1+1	0	0	0
58	MF	(Jamaica)	Brandon Cover	1	0	0	0	1	0	0	0
Out on loan:
16	DF	(Denmark)	Victor Kristiansen	0	0	0	0	0	0	0	0
24	MF	(France)	Boubakary Soumaré	0	0	0	0	0	0	0	0
31	GK	(Denmark)	Daniel Iversen	0	0	0	0	0	0	0	0
33	DF	(England)	Luke Thomas	0	0	0	0	0	0	0	0
Left club during season:
7	MF	(Italy)	Cesare Casadei	25	3	8+14	2	1	1	2	0
12	GK	(England)	Alex Smithies	0	0	0	0	0	0	0	0
27	DF	(Belgium)	Timothy Castagne	0	0	0	0	0	0	0	0

=== Goalscorers ===
Last updated: 29 April 2024

Rank	No.	Pos.	Nat.	Player	Championship	FA Cup	EFL Cup	Total
1	9	FW	(England)	Jamie Vardy	18	1	1	20
2	10	FW	(England)	Stephy Mavididi	12	1	0	13
3	22	MF	(England)	Kiernan Dewsbury-Hall	12	0	0	12
4	20	FW	(Zambia)	Patson Daka	7	0	0	7
4	18	FW	(Ghana)	Abdul Fatawu	6	1	0	7
4	35	MF	(England)	Kasey McAteer	6	0	1	7
7	14	FW	(Nigeria)	Kelechi Iheanacho	5	0	1	6
7	25	MF	(Nigeria)	Wilfred Ndidi	4	0	2	6
9	21	DF	(Portugal)	Ricardo Pereira	3	1	0	4
10	7	MF	(Italy)	Cesare Casadei	2	1	0	3
10	28	FW	(Republic of Ireland)	Tom Cannon	2	1	0	3
12	2	DF	(England)	James Justin	2	0	0	2
12	3	DF	(Belgium)	Wout Faes	2	0	0	2
12	8	MF	(England)	Harry Winks	2	0	0	2
12	23	DF	(Denmark)	Jannik Vestergaard	2	0	0	2
12	29	FW	(Turkey)	Yunus Akgün	1	1	0	2
17	40	FW	(Portugal)	Wanya Marçal	1	0	0	1
17	45	DF	(England)	Ben Nelson	1	0	0	1
17	26	MF	(Belgium)	Dennis Praet	0	1	0	1
Own goals					1	1	0	2
Total					89	9	5	103

=== Assists ===
Last updated: 29 April 2024

Rank	No.	Pos.	Nat.	Player	Championship	FA Cup	EFL Cup	Total
1	22	MF	(England)	Kiernan Dewsbury-Hall	14	1	0	15
2	18	FW	(Ghana)	Abdul Fatawu	13	0	0	13
3	10	FW	(England)	Stephy Mavididi	6	0	0	6
3	25	MF	(Nigeria)	Wilfred Ndidi	5	0	1	6
5	20	FW	(Zambia)	Patson Daka	5	0	0	5
7	2	DF	(England)	James Justin	3	0	0	3
7	21	DF	(Portugal)	Ricardo Pereira	3	0	0	3
7	29	FW	(Turkey)	Yunus Akgün	2	0	1	3
7	14	FW	(Nigeria)	Kelechi Iheanacho	1	1	1	3
7	11	MF	(England)	Marc Albrighton	0	2	1	3
11	9	FW	(England)	Jamie Vardy	2	0	0	2
11	5	DF	(England)	Callum Doyle	1	1	0	2
11	28	FW	(Republic of Ireland)	Tom Cannon	1	1	0	2
11	7	MF	(Italy)	Cesare Casadei	0	1	1	2
15	17	MF	(England)	Hamza Choudhury	1	0	0	1
15	26	MF	(Belgium)	Dennis Praet	1	0	0	1
Total					57	7	5	69

=== Clean sheets ===
Last updated: 29 April 2024

Rank	No.	Pos.	Nat.	Player	Championship	FA Cup	EFL Cup	Total
1	30	GK	(Denmark)	Mads Hermansen	13	0	0	13
2	41	GK	(Poland)	Jakub Stolarczyk	2	2	2	6
Total					15	2	2	19

=== Disciplinary record ===
Last updated: 4 May 2024

No.	Pos.	Nat.	Player	Championship			FA Cup			EFL Cup			Total		
No.	Pos.	Nat.	Player	Yellow card	(yellow card) (yellow-red card)	Red card	Yellow card	(yellow card) (yellow-red card)	Red card	Yellow card	(yellow card) (yellow-red card)	Red card	Yellow card	(yellow card) (yellow-red card)	Red card
2	DF	(England)	James Justin	4	0	0	1	0	0	0	0	0	5	0	0
3	DF	(Belgium)	Wout Faes	6	0	0	0	0	0	1	0	0	7	0	0
4	DF	(England)	Conor Coady	1	0	0	1	0	0	0	0	0	2	0	0
5	DF	(England)	Callum Doyle	1	0	0	1	0	1	0	0	0	2	0	1
7	MF	(Italy)	Cesare Casadei	1	0	0	0	0	0	0	0	0	1	0	0
8	MF	(England)	Harry Winks	9	0	0	0	0	0	0	0	0	9	0	0
9	FW	(England)	Jamie Vardy	4	0	0	0	0	0	0	0	0	4	0	0
10	FW	(England)	Stephy Mavididi	7	0	0	1	0	0	0	0	0	8	0	0
14	FW	(Nigeria)	Kelechi Iheanacho	1	0	0	0	0	0	0	0	0	1	0	0
17	MF	(England)	Hamza Choudhury	5	0	0	0	0	0	1	0	0	6	0	0
18	FW	(Ghana)	Abdul Fatawu	6	0	1	1	0	0	0	0	0	7	0	1
20	FW	(Zambia)	Patson Daka	1	0	0	0	0	0	0	0	0	1	0	0
21	DF	(Portugal)	Ricardo Pereira	8	0	0	1	0	0	1	0	0	10	0	0
22	MF	(England)	Kiernan Dewsbury-Hall	6	0	0	0	0	0	0	0	0	6	0	0
23	DF	(Denmark)	Jannik Vestergaard	13	0	0	0	0	0	0	0	0	13	0	0
25	MF	(Nigeria)	Wilfred Ndidi	5	0	0	0	0	0	0	0	0	5	0	0
28	FW	(Republic of Ireland)	Tom Cannon	1	0	0	1	0	0	0	0	0	2	0	0
29	FW	(Turkey)	Yunus Akgün	1	0	0	0	0	0	0	0	0	1	0	0
30	GK	(Denmark)	Mads Hermansen	2	0	0	0	0	0	0	0	0	2	0	0
35	MF	(England)	Kasey McAteer	2	0	0	0	0	0	0	0	0	2	0	0
45	DF	(England)	Ben Nelson	2	0	0	0	0	0	0	0	0	2	0	0
47	MF	(England)	Arjan Raikhy	0	0	0	1	0	0	0	0	0	1	0	0
Total				85	0	1	8	0	1	3	0	0	96	0	2
