= James Justin =

English footballer (born 1998)

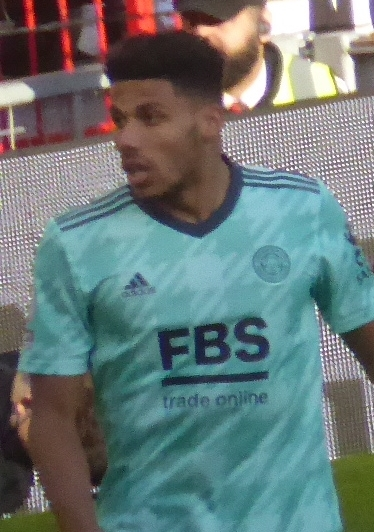
- Justin playing for Leicester City in 2022

Personal information
- Full name: James Michael Justin
- Date of birth: 23 February 1998 (age 28)
- Place of birth: Luton, England
- Height: 6 ft 0 in (1.83 m)
- Positions: Wing-back; full-back; centre-back

Team information
- Current team: Leeds United
- Number: 24

Youth career
- 2005–2015: Luton Town

Senior career*
Years	Team	Apps	(Gls)
2015–2019	Luton Town	90	(6)
2019–2025	Leicester City	140	(6)
2025–	Leeds United	40	(3)

International career
2017	England U20	2	(0)
2019–2020	England U21	8	(1)
2022	England	1	(0)
- * Club domestic league appearances and goals as of 22:24, 21 November 2026 (UTC)

James Michael Justin (born 23 February 1998) is an English professional footballer who plays for Premier League club Leeds United. Mainly a full-back, he can also be deployed as a wide centre-back in a back three.

Justin started his career with Luton Town after progressing through their academy, making his professional debut in 2016. His breakthrough came in the 2016–17 season as he became an important part of the team. He struggled to establish his place in the 2017–18 season but Luton were promoted to EFL League One. The following season, he once again became an integral player for Luton as they secured back-to-back promotions. He joined Leicester City in 2019 after four seasons with Luton. He established himself in the Leicester team in the 2020–21 season, but his involvement was cut short after suffering an ACL injury. He made his return in January 2022, but suffered another ACL injury in November, ruling him out for the rest of the 2022–23 season. Following Leicester's relegation, Justin became an important player for Enzo Maresca in the EFL Championship, the club securing an instant return to the Premier League after winning the league title.

Justin represented England at various youth levels before making his debut for the senior team in May 2022.

== Early and personal life ==
Born in Luton, Bedfordshire, Justin grew up in Stopsley and attended Putteridge High School from years 2009 to 2014. Justin is of Saint Lucian descent through his father. His parents worked for the HMRC. His father died of cancer in April 2020, having been a life-long Luton Town fan. Justin has a son.

== Club career ==
=== Luton Town ===
After playing for local side Crawley Green, Justin joined Luton Town in 2005 at age seven and progressed through the club's youth system. He was part of the under-11 team that beat Bayern Munich 3–2 to win the Aarau Masters in 2009. Justin was called up to the under-18 team as an under-16 due to injuries to other players, playing at right-back despite being a central midfielder. Following his breakthrough into the under-18 team, Justin also played regularly for the club's development squad that ended 2014–15 as champions of the Central League Southern Division. Justin signed his first professional contract on 4 November 2015 which contracted him to the club until the end of 2016–17. He was named in the matchday squad for the first time on 19 December, remaining an unused substitute in Luton's 3–2 win away to Exeter City. Justin was a member of the under-18 team that won the Youth Alliance South East title and the Youth Alliance Cup in 2015–16, and also reached the quarter-finals of the FA Youth Cup, in which they lost 1–0 to Blackburn Rovers. He made his professional debut as an 83rd-minute substitute for Stephen O'Donnell in a 4–1 win at home to Exeter City on the final day of 2015–16.

Justin broke into the first team in 2016–17, making his full debut at left-back in a 3–1 win at home to newly relegated Championship club Aston Villa in the EFL Cup first round on 10 August 2016. He received his full league debut on 24 September, in a 3–1 win over Doncaster Rovers. He suffered a calf injury in the warm up before Luton's 2–1 win away to Leyton Orient on 15 October, and returned to the team for a 3–1 victory away to Exeter City in the FA Cup first round on 5 November. After making 14 appearances in all competitions during the first half of the season playing in a number of different positions including at right-back and as a left winger, Justin signed a new two-and-a-half-year contract to keep him at Luton until the summer of 2019, with the option of a further year. He was named Luton Town Young Player of the Season, selected by the Luton Town management team. Justin scored his first professional goal in a 4–1 victory away to Accrington Stanley on 29 April 2017, but was stretchered off after he suffered an ankle ligament sprain in the following match, a 3–1 win at home to Morecambe. However, he recovered in time to play against Blackpool in the play-off semi-final, and started in both legs of the 6–5 aggregate defeat. Justin finished the season with 39 appearances and one goal.

On 12 July 2017, Luton rejected a bid of £1 million for Justin from Championship club Nottingham Forest. Later that month, Justin signed a contract extension with Luton until 2020, with the option of a further year. Justin returned from the England under-19 training camp with a hamstring injury, and subsequently missed the first few matches of the 2017–18 season. His first match of the season came in a 2–2 draw to Tottenham Hotspur under-21s in the EFL Trophy on 15 August. On 14 October, Justin made his first league start and scored his first goal of the season in a 7–1 win over Stevenage. Justin struggled to establish his place the team, finishing the season with 22 appearances and two goals. However, his contract was extended by a further year at the end of the season after a promotion clause was triggered as a result of Luton's promotion to League One.

Justin started the season opener in a 1–0 defeat to Portsmouth on 4 August 2018. Justin initially struggled for play-time again, making only two league starts by October in midfield due to competition from fellow full-backs Jack Stacey and Dan Potts. However, Potts suffered a groin injury in a 2–0 win over Walsall on 20 October, with Justin tasked to replace him. He regained his team in the starting eleven following Potts's injury, with Justin stating, "Then whenever my opportunity came, this year it came through unfortunate circumstances with Pottsy getting injured, but I feel like I've taken my chance well." He won the November EFL Young Player of the Month after making 4 appearances and scoring twice that month. As a mainstay in the squad, he finished the season with 52 appearances and three goals. Luton had also achieved back-to-back promotions, this time finishing as champions of League One. Justin won the Luton Young Player of the Season again, and was also named in the PFA League One Team of the Year and nominated for the Young Player of the Season. In total, Justin made 114 appearances and scored six times for Luton.

=== Leicester City ===
Justin signed for Premier League club Leicester City on 28 June 2019 on a five-year contract for an undisclosed fee, although it was reported to be a Luton club record fee of around £8 million. On 24 September, he scored on his debut in a 4–0 away victory over his former club Luton in the EFL Cup third round. On 4 December, he made his Premier League debut with the club as an 80th-minute substitute in a 2–0 victory against Watford. He made his first league start for Leicester on 28 December in a 2–1 win over West Ham United. He made his second league start of the season on 9 March 2020 in place of injured Ben Chilwell in a 4–0 win over Aston Villa. Manager Brendan Rodgers praised his performance that match, stating "I thought he was absolutely outstanding in his performance." Justin struggled to get regular game-time, facing competition from first-choice right-back Ricardo Pereira. However, Pereira suffered a season-long injury in March, and Justin was expected to replace him for the rest of the season. Although the rest of the season was postponed due to the COVID-19 pandemic, he made 10 more appearances after the league was resumed. In total, he made 18 appearances and scored once in his debut season for Leicester.

"JJ [Justin] is getting better with every game that he plays and with the experience he is gaining. He is a fantastic talent. He is working very hard and he still has a lot of work to do but at 22 years of age he is developing very, very well."

— Leicester manager Brendan Rodgers on Justin during the 2020–21 season.

Justin started the 2020–21 season opener on 13 September 2020, a 3–0 win over West Bromwich Albion. He scored his first league goal for Leicester on 20 September in a 4–2 win over Burnley. He made his European debut on 22 October, in a 3–0 win in the UEFA Europa League against Zorya Luhansk after coming on for Timothy Castagne as a substitute. Justin became a key part of the Leicester side at the start of the season in the midst of a defensive injury crisis. He scored in a 4–0 win in the FA Cup against Stoke City on 9 January 2021. On 10 February, Justin came off in a 1–0 FA Cup win over Brighton & Hove Albion with a knee injury. It was later revealed that he would be out for the rest of the season with an ACL injury. The injury also cut short Justin's involvement in Leicester City's victorious 2020–21 FA Cup campaign. He made 31 appearances and 3 goals before his season was disrupted by the injury.

After eleven months on the sidelines, on 19 January 2022, Justin made his return in a 3–2 defeat to Tottenham Hotspur. After starting in the five subsequent fixtures for the Foxes, he signed a new long-term contract with the club until 2026 on 23 February. He made 5 appearances in the 2021–22 UEFA Europa Conference League as Leicester reached the semi-finals, but were ultimately eliminated by AS Roma. Upon his return, he re-established his place in the team, starting 8 of the last 12 league matches. He finished the season with 19 appearances.

Justin started the 2022–23 season opener on 7 August 2022, in a 2–2 draw to Brentford. On 8 November, Justin scored his first goal of the season in an EFL Cup match against Newport County which finished in a 3–0 victory. However, Justin was stretchered off in the second half that match. It was later revelead that Justin would miss the rest of the season with another ruptured ACL. With the injury setback, he finished the season with 15 appearances and one goal. Leicester were relegated to the Championship at the end of the season.

Ahead of the 2023–24 season, new manager Enzo Maresca promised Justin game-time, stating "I am sure he [Justin] is going to play a lot of games with us." Justin's first match of the season came on 9 August in the EFL Cup, starting in a 2–0 win over Burton Albion. He made his first league start of the season on 15 September, in a 4–1 win over Southampton. He scored his first goal of the season on 24 October in a 1–0 win over Sunderland. Justin was a key player for Leicester that season, starting in 30 matches for Leicester as they made an instant return to the Premier League after winning the Championship. He also won Leicester Goal of the Season for a goal against Cardiff City. He made 45 appearances and scored twice that season.

On 28 September 2024, Justin scored two goals in a 4–2 away defeat to Arsenal. He made 39 appearances and scored four times as Leicester were relegated back to the Championship.

=== Leeds United ===
On 25 August 2025, Justin signed a four-year contract with Leeds United for £8 million, with a possible additional £2 million in add-ons. On 30 August 2025 Justin made his Leeds United debut as an 80th-minute substitute in a 0–0 draw with Newcastle United at Elland Road.

On 11 January 2026, Justin scored his first goal for Leeds United in the 93rd minute of a 3-1 win in the 3rd Round of the FA Cup against Derby County.

On 26 January 2026, Justin scored his first Premier League goal for Leeds United in the 28th minute of a 1-1 draw with Everton in Leeds's first-ever match at Hill Dickinson Stadium.

== International career ==
On 1 June 2017, Justin was called up to the England under-19 team for a training camp in Spain ahead of the 2017 UEFA European Under-19 Championship. He was retained by manager Keith Downing for two further training camps, but did not make the final 18-man squad. Justin received his first call-up to the England under-20 team on 24 August 2017 for two friendly matches against the Netherlands and Switzerland. He made his debut a week later in a 3–0 victory over the Netherlands, coming on as a substitute in the 74th minute. Justin made his full debut after starting against Switzerland four days later, before being substituted on 62 minutes, the match finishing a 0–0 draw.

Justin was called up to the England under-21 team for the first time on 30 August 2019 for two 2021 UEFA European Under-21 Championship qualification matches against Turkey and Kosovo. He made his debut as an 80th-minute substitute for the injured Max Aarons in a 2–0 win over Kosovo on 9 September.

Justin received his first call up to the senior team on 24 May 2022 for the 2022–23 UEFA Nations League matches against Hungary, Germany and Italy. He made his debut on 4 June against Hungary but was substituted at half time due to injury.

== Style of play ==
Justin primarily plays as a right-back, although he has been described as being "versatile" and "attack-minded" and is able to play as a left-back, central midfielder, right midfielder and a left winger.

== Career statistics ==
=== Club ===
As of match played 10 October 2026

Appearances and goals by club, season and competition
Club	Season	League			FA Cup		EFL Cup		Europe		Other		Total	
Club	Season	Division	Apps	Goals	Apps	Goals	Apps	Goals	Apps	Goals	Apps	Goals	Apps	Goals
Luton Town	2015–16	League Two	1	0	0	0	0	0	—		0	0	1	0
Luton Town	2016–17	League Two	29	1	3	0	1	0	—		6 (Note: Four appearances in EFL Trophy, two appearances in League Two play-offs)	0	39	1
Luton Town	2017–18	League Two	17	2	1	0	0	0	—		4 (Note: Appearances in EFL Trophy)	0	22	2
Luton Town	2018–19	League One	43	3	4	0	1	0	—		4	0	52	3
Luton Town	Total		90	6	8	0	2	0	—		14	0	114	6
Leicester City	2019–20	Premier League	13	0	3	0	2	1	—		—		18	1
Leicester City	2020–21	Premier League	23	2	2	1	0	0	6 (Note: Appearances in UEFA Europa League)	0	—		31	3
Leicester City	2021–22	Premier League	13	0	1	0	0	0	5 (Note: Appearances in UEFA Europa Conference League)	0	0	0	19	0
Leicester City	2022–23	Premier League	14	0	0	0	1	1	—		—		15	1
Leicester City	2023–24	Championship	39	2	3	0	3	0	—		—		45	2
Leicester City	2024–25	Premier League	36	2	2	2	1	0	—		—		39	4
Leicester City	2025–26	Championship	2	0	—		0	0	—		—		2	0
Leicester City	Total		140	6	11	3	7	2	11	0	0	0	169	11
Leeds United	2025–26	Premier League	29	2	5	1	0	0	—		—		34	3
Leeds United	2026–27	Premier League	6	1	0	0	2	1	—		—		8	2
Leeds United	Total		35	3	5	1	2	1	—		—		42	5
Career total			265	15	24	4	11	3	11	0	14	0	325	22

=== International ===
As of match played 4 June 2022

Appearances and goals by national team and year
National team	Year	Apps	Goals
England	2022	1	0
Total		1	0

== Honours ==
Luton Town

- EFL League One: 2018–19

Leicester City

- EFL Championship: 2023–24

Individual

- Luton Town Young Player of the Season: 2016–17, 2018–19
- EFL Young Player of the Month: November 2018
- EFL Team of the Season: 2018–19
- PFA Team of the Year: 2018–19 League One
