= Jakub Stolarczyk =

Polish footballer (born 2000)

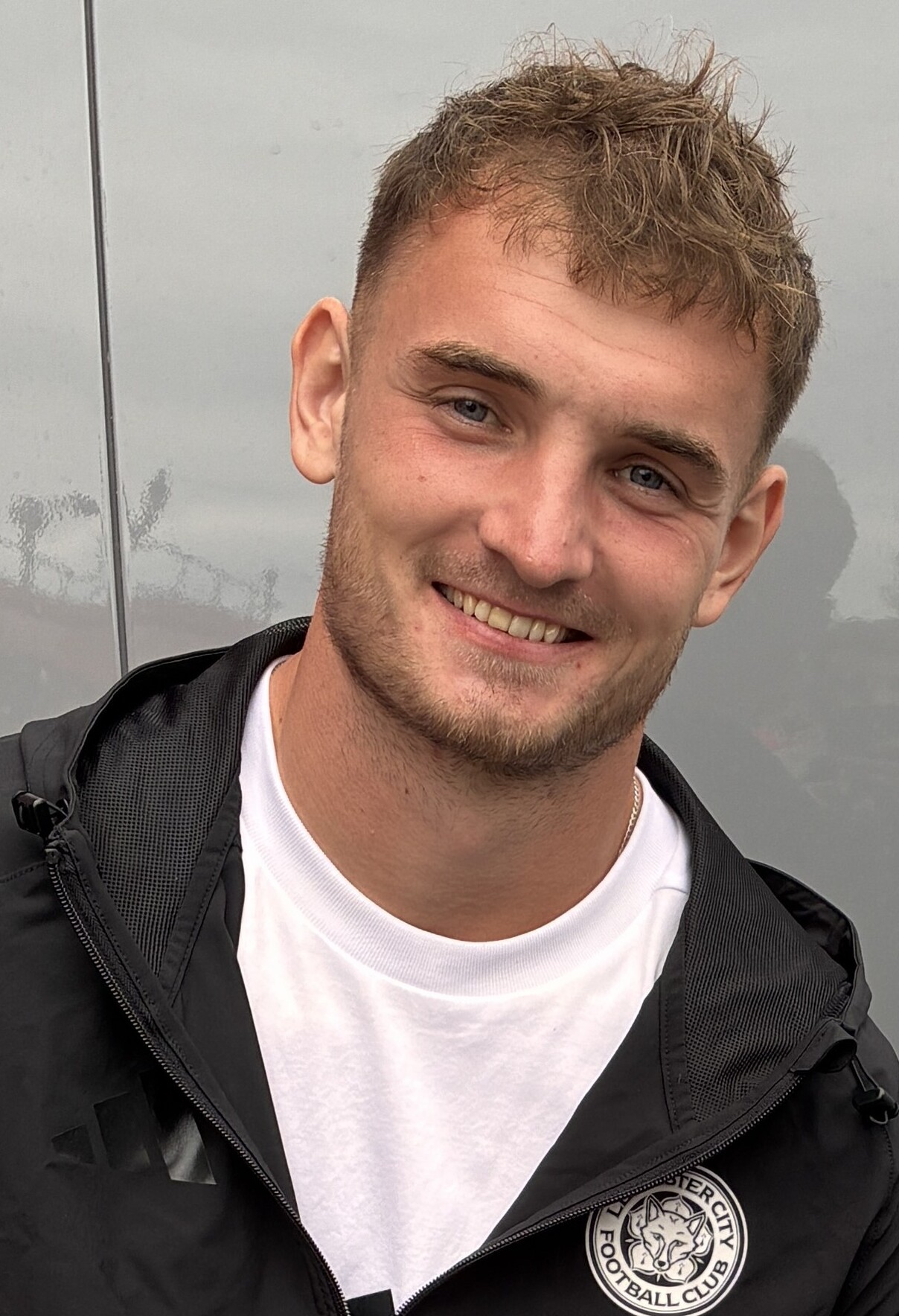
- Jakub Stolarczyk in 2025 with Leicester City

Personal information
- Date of birth: 19 December 2000 (age 25)
- Place of birth: Kielce, Poland
- Height: 1.94 m (6 ft 4 in)
- Position: Goalkeeper

Team information
- Current team: Leicester City
- Number: 1

Youth career
- –2015: UKS Chęciny
- 2015: Piast Chęciny
- 2017–2021: Leicester City

Senior career*
Years	Team	Apps	(Gls)
2015–2017	Piast Chęciny	10	(0)
2021–	Leicester City	50	(0)
2022	→ Dunfermline Athletic (loan)	11	(0)
2022–2023	→ Fleetwood Town (loan)	0	(0)
2023	→ Hartlepool United (loan)	17	(0)

International career
2017	Poland U18	1	(0)
2018	Poland U19	1	(0)
2021	Poland U21	1	(0)
- * Club domestic league appearances and goals as of 23:32, 4 September 2026 (UTC)

Jakub Stolarczyk (born 19 December 2000) is a Polish professional footballer who plays as a goalkeeper for EFL League One club Leicester City.

== Career ==
Stolarczyk started his career with Polish seventh tier side Piast Chęciny.

=== Leicester City ===
In 2017, he joined the youth academy of Leicester City in the Premier League.

==== Loan to Dumfermline Athletic ====
On 31 January 2022, Stolarczyk was sent on loan to Scottish second-tier club Dunfermline Athletic. He made his professional debut for the club in a 1–1 draw against Ayr United in the Scottish Championship five days later. He was praised by the manager John Hughes and fans for having a 'sensational' performance.

==== Loan to Fleetwood Town ====
On 15 August 2022, Stolarczyk signed a new contract and was sent on a season-long loan to EFL League One club Fleetwood Town. On 23 August 2022, he made his debut for Fleetwood Town in a 1–0 loss to Premier League side Everton in the second round of the EFL Cup. He had 3 appearances in the FA Cup, playing a pivotal part on leading up to the club's first-ever Fourth Round tie. However, as he never appeared in any league games, he was recalled by Leicester from his loan on 13 January 2023.

==== Loan to Hartlepool United ====
On 23 January, he joined EFL League Two club Hartlepool United on loan until the end of the season. On 4 February, he was chosen over fellow goalkeeper Ben Killip and made his club debut for Hartlepool in a 1–0 away win over Doncaster Rovers in the league.

==== Return to Leicester City ====
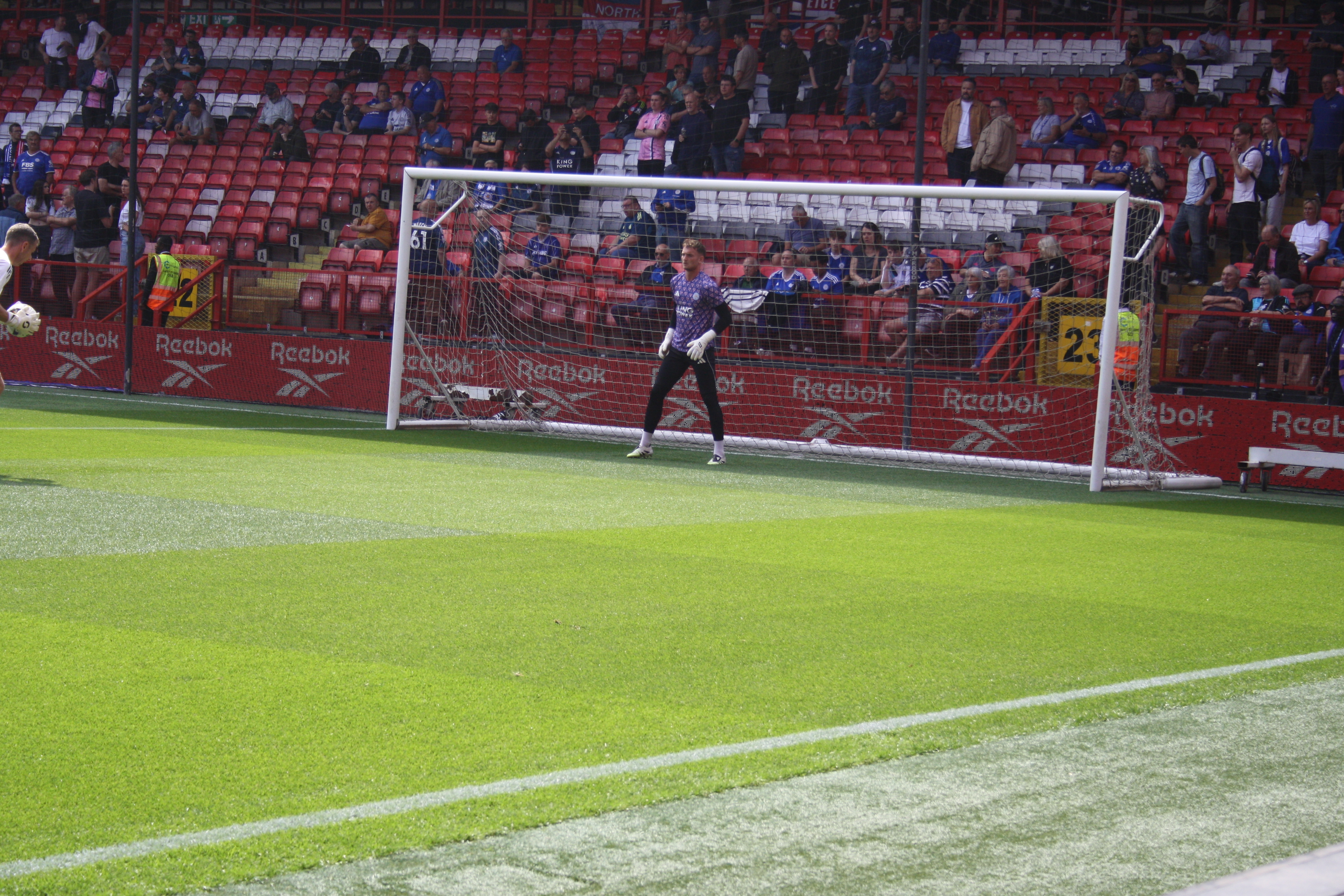
Jakub Stolarczyk warming up before the Leicester City’s match against Charlton Athletic.

On 9 August 2023, Stolarczyk made his Leicester City senior debut in a 2–0 away win against Burton Albion in the first round of the EFL Cup. He made his league debut in the EFL Championship three days later in a 1–0 away win against Huddersfield Town. In March 2024, Stolarczyk played for Leicester in their FA Cup quarter-final away defeat to Chelsea and saved a first half penalty from Raheem Sterling.

In July 2024, it was announced that he would be sidelined for up to six months due to an ankle injury. On 27 December 2024, Stolarczyk made his Premier League debut in a 3–1 away loss against Liverpool.

At the start of the 2025–26 season, Stolarczyk was handed the number one shirt at Leicester.

Following a knee injury sustained in September 2026, Stolarczyk was ruled out for the rest of the 2026–27 season.

== Career statistics ==
As of match played 1 September 2026

Appearances and goals by club, season and competition
Club	Season	League			FA Cup		League Cup		Other		Total	
Club	Season	Division	Apps	Goals	Apps	Goals	Apps	Goals	Apps	Goals	Apps	Goals
Leicester City U23	2020–21	—			—		—		5 (Note: Appearance(s) in EFL Trophy)	0	5	0
Leicester City	2023–24	Championship	2	0	4	0	3	0	—		9	0
Leicester City	2024–25	Premier League	10	0	1	0	0	0	—		11	0
Leicester City	2025–26	Championship	36	0	1	0	1	0	—		38	0
Leicester City	2026–27	League One	2	0	0	0	2	0	0	0	4	0
Leicester City	Total		50	0	6	0	6	0	0	0	62	0
Dunfermline Athletic (loan)	2021–22	Scottish Championship	11	0	0	0	0	0	2 (Note: Appearances in Scottish Championship play-offs)	0	13	0
Fleetwood Town (loan)	2022–23	League One	0	0	3	0	1	0	3	0	7	0
Hartlepool United (loan)	2022–23	League Two	17	0	0	0	0	0	0	0	17	0
Career total			78	0	9	0	6	0	10	0	98	0

== Honours ==
Leicester City

- EFL Championship: 2023–24
