= 2024–25 Leicester City F.C. season =

120th season in existence of Leicester City FC

Leicester City
2024–25 season
- Owner: King Power
- Chairman: Aiyawatt Srivaddhanaprabha
- Manager: Steve Cooper (until 24 November); Ben Dawson (caretaker, from 24 to 30 November); Ruud van Nistelrooy (from 1 December)
- Stadium: King Power Stadium
- Premier League: 18th (relegated)
- FA Cup: Fourth round
- EFL Cup: Fourth round
- Top goalscorer: League: Jamie Vardy (9); All: Jamie Vardy (10)
- Highest home attendance: 32,057 (v. Manchester City, 29 December 2024)
- Lowest home attendance: 13,011 (v. Tranmere Rovers, 27 August 2024)
- Average home league attendance: 31,448
- Biggest win: 6–2 v. Queens Park Rangers (11 January 2025, FA Cup)
- Biggest defeat: 0–4 v. Newcastle United (14 December 2024, Premier League); 0–4 v. Everton (1 February 2025, Premier League); 0–4 v. Brentford (21 February 2025, Premier League)
Home colours	Away colours	Third colours

The 2024–25 season was the 120th season in the existence of Leicester City Football Club, their first season back in the Premier League following promotion from the EFL Championship in the previous season, and their 56th (non-consecutive) season in top flight football. In addition to the domestic league, the club also competed in the FA Cup and the EFL Cup.

This was the first season since 2013–14 to not feature Marc Albrighton, who retired upon the expiration of his contract in the summer. It was also the club's last season to feature striker Jamie Vardy, departing after 13 years at the club, scoring 200 goals in 500 appearances. He made his final appearance against Ipswich Town on 18 May 2025.

On 7 April 2025, Leicester lost 3–0 at home to Newcastle United; this was their eighth consecutive home defeat without scoring, which set a new record in English football. Leicester were officially relegated back to the Championship after losing 1–0 at home to league leaders Liverpool on 20 April. This left the team 18 points from safety with five matches left to play, and extended their run of home losses without scoring to nine games. They also became the first team in English top-flight history to fail to score in nine consecutive home games, and the third team after Norwich City and West Bromwich Albion to suffer relegation at least five times.

== Management team ==
The management team from the start of the season until 24 November 2024.

Position	Name
First Team Manager	(Wales) Steve Cooper
Assistant Manager	(England) Alan Tate
First Team Set Piece Coach	(England) Andrew Hughes
Goalkeeping Coach	(England) Danny Alcock
First Team Coach & Analyst	(England) Steve Rands
First Team Coach	(England) Ben Dawson

The management team from 29 November 2024.

Position	Name
First Team Manager	(Netherlands) Ruud van Nistelrooy
First Team Coach	(Netherlands) Jelle ten Rouwelaar
First Team Coach	(Republic of Ireland) Brian Barry-Murphy (from 24 December 2024)
First Team Coach	(Wales) Andy King (from 19 February 2025)
First Team Set Piece Coach	(England) Andrew Hughes
First Team Coach	(England) Ben Dawson (until 24 February 2025)
Goalkeeping Coach	(England) Danny Alcock (until 24 February 2025)

== Kits ==
Home	Away	Third
Goalkeeper 1	Goalkeeper 2	Goalkeeper 3

== Season summary ==
=== Start of season ===
==== August ====
Leicester City started the season with a home game against Tottenham Hotspur. Pedro Porro scored a header for Tottenham in the 29th minute to make it 1–0 to Tottenham, which was the score at half-time. Tottenham created many chances during the first half but were unable to take them, and were punished by Leicester for not doing so in the second half. The second half had restarted, and Victor Kristiansen put in a cross for Jamie Vardy, however he was unable to connect and the cross overhit to the right wing with Fatawu on the ball. He crossed to an unmarked Vardy in the box and Vardy scored to make it 1–1 in the 57th minute, the final score in the end.

The first away game of the season, at Fulham's Craven Cottage was played on 24 August. Leicester lost 2–1 with an equalising goal from Wout Faes in the 38th minute. Emile Smith Rowe opened the scoring for Fulham and Alex Iwobi scored the winner in the 70th minute.

Leicester entered the EFL Cup in the second round, and were drawn at home to Tranmere Rovers. Leicester won the game 4–0, with goals from Ayew, Mavididi, Ndidi and Winks. Leicester advanced through the third round, where they were drawn away to Walsall's Bescot Stadium.

By the end of August, Leicester were 15th place in the league, 1 point clear of the relegation zone.

==== September ====
Following a week's break for international matches, Leicester returned to action on 14 September, playing Crystal Palace at Selhurst Park in the Premier League. Jamie Vardy put the Foxes 1–0 up after 21 minutes. Then, Stephy Mavididi scored 37 seconds after the second half had restarted to make it 2–0 to the Foxes. Then, 86 seconds after Mavididi's goal, Jean-Philippe Mateta scored to make it 2–1. The score remained the same until the 92nd minute when Jean-Phillipe Mateta scored a late penalty to make it 2–2, the final score. On 21 September, Leicester were at home in the Premier League to Everton. The visitors scored in the first-half with a goal from Iliman Ndiaye in the 12th minute. Leicester equalised in the 73rd minute through Stephy Mavididi. The game finished 1–1.

On 24 September, Leicester City travelled to the Bescot Stadium to play Walsall in an EFL Cup third round match. The game finished 0–0 with both sides unable to score any goals. In the penalty shoot-out, Danny Ward saved all 3 Walsall penalties to help Leicester advance through to the fourth round 3–0 on penalties. They were then drew to Manchester United away at Old Trafford for the fourth round of the EFL Cup.

The Emirates Stadium hosted Leicester on 28 September as they played Arsenal in the Premier League. Gabriel Martinelli scored for Arsenal after 20 minutes, and then Arsenal doubled their lead through a Leandro Trossard goal to make it 2–0 at half-time. In the second half, James Justin scored in the 47th minute through a header and then scored a superb volley to level it at 2–2 in the 63rd minute. However, in the fourth minute of injury time in the second half, Wilfred Ndidi scored an own-goal via an Arsenal corner to make it 3–2 to Arsenal. 5 minutes later, Kai Havertz sealed the game with a goal to eventually make it 4–2 to Arsenal, the final score.

At the end of September, Leicester were 17th place in the league, outside of the relegation zone on goals scored.

==== October ====
On 5 October, Leicester returned at home in the Premier League for their match against Bournemouth. Facundo Buonanotte opened the scoresheet in the 16th minute for Leicester. Bournemouth had many chances to equalise throughout the game however the match finished 1–0 in Leicester's favour, giving Leicester their first Premier League win of the season, as well as their first home win of the season.

On 19 October, Leicester travelled to St Mary's Stadium for a Premier League game against Southampton. Cameron Archer scored for Southampton in the 8th minute and Joe Aribo scored to make it 2–0 to Southampton after just 28 minutes, which was the score at half time. In the second-half, Leicester scored three goals in a 3–2 comeback win through a 64th-minute goal from Facundo Buonanotte, a Jamie Vardy penalty goal in which Ryan Fraser was sent off and Jordan Ayew in the 8th minute of added stoppage time. This obtained Leicester their 2nd win of the Premier League season and their first away win in the Premier League season.

Returning to the King Power Stadium on 25 October, Leicester played Nottingham Forest in the Premier League. After Nottingham Forest opened the scoring through a Ryan Yates strike through a corner, Jamie Vardy equalised in the 23rd minute to make it 1–1, the score at half-time. However, in the second half, former Leicester player Chris Wood scored a brace against his old team, scoring in the 47th minute and the 60th minute to complete his brace. No further goals were scored, and Nottingham Forest came out 3–1 winners against fierce rivals Leicester.

Leicester then travelled to Manchester United's Old Trafford for an EFL Cup Round 4 game. Leicester lost the game 5–2, with a first-half brace from Casemiro, a goal from Alejandro Garnacho and Bruno Fernandes giving United 4 goals. However, Leicester scored twice with a strike from El Khannouss hitting both posts and going in and a header from a corner by Conor Coady making the score 4–2 at half-time. Bruno Fernandes struck again for his brace in the 59th minute and the game ended 5–2 to United in the end.

At the end of October, Leicester were 15th in the league, on 9 points and 5 points clear of the relegation zone.

==== November ====
On 2 November, Leicester travelled to Portman Road to play Ipswich Town in the Premier League. Ipswich took the lead in the 53rd minute from a superb volley by Leif Davis. In the 77th minute, Kalvin Phillips was sent-off for Ipswich having received two yellow cards, leaving them down to 10 men. Leicester equalised in the 4th minute of stoppage time in the second half through a Jordan Ayew goal, making it 1–1. The game finished 1–1 and Leicester remained in 15th place. Leicester then travelled to Old Trafford on 10 November for a Premier League game against Manchester United. It finished 3–0, with a Bruno Fernandes strike in the 17th minute making it 1–0 to United. A deflected Bruno Fernandes shot then hit Victor Kristansen, who scored an own goal this way, making it 2–0 to United. In the second half, substitute Alejandro Garnacho scored in the 82nd minute to secure a 3–0 win for United. Leicester City's next game was a Premier League fixture against Chelsea on 23 November. They took the lead in the 15th minute when Nicolas Jackson capitalised on a defensive error from Wout Faes and scored, making it 1–0 Chelsea. This remained the score at half time. In the second half, they added a second in the 75th minute when Enzo Fernández scored another goal for Chelsea to make it 2–0 to Chelsea. Leicester were then awarded a penalty 5 minutes into stoppage time in the second half, which was converted by Jordan Ayew to make it 2–1. Nevertheless, the game finished 2–1 in Chelsea's favour as Leicester dropped down to 16th place in the league.

Leicester then sacked manager Steve Cooper following the loss to Chelsea. The club was 1 point above the relegation zone, having already suffered their sixth loss of the season and only 2 wins from 12 games. His assistant manager Alan Tate also left the club on the same day, and so did Steve Rands, the club's First Team Coach.

The Foxes were the visitors to the Gtech Community Stadium on 30 November for a Premier League game against Brentford, with Ben Dawson taking charge as interim manager before Ruud van Nistelrooy officially took charge of first-team duties. They took the lead in the 21st minute when Buonanotte scored a tap-in from long range. Brentford equalised quickly in the 25th minute through Yoane Wissa. Then shortly after, Kevin Schade completed his brace in 23 minutes, scoring in the 29th minute and the 8th minute of first half stoppage time, leaving Brentford 3–1 up in the first half. 14 minutes after the second half began, Schade completed his first professional hat-trick by scoring in the 59th minute. No further goals were scored, and Brentford ran out 4–1 winners in the end.

Leicester remained 16th in the league, 1 point above the relegation zone by the end of November.

==== December ====
On 1 December, Ruud van Nistelrooy was officially appointed as First Team Manager, in place of the recently sacked Steve Cooper. Jelle ten Rouwellar also joined the club on the same day as assistant manager, in place of Alan Tate and Ben Dawson was appointed new First Team Coach in place of Steve Rands.

Ruud van Nistelrooy got his first win with Leicester in his debut match, 3–1 against West Ham United at the King Power Stadium on 3 December, through a goal in just 98 seconds from Vardy, a 61st-minute strike from El Khannouss to mark his debut Premier League goal and Daka in the 90th minute to grab his first Premier League goal of the season, and the score was 3–0 after the normal 90 minutes of regulation time. Niclas Füllkrug then scored a consolation goal to make it 3–1 in the 3rd minute of added stoppage time. The game ended in a 3–1 win to the Foxes. In Ruud's second game in charge at home, on 8 December, he managed to rescue a late point at the King Power against Brighton in a 2–2 draw, after being 2–0 down in the 85th minute, through late goals from Jamie Vardy in the 86th minute and Bobby De-Cordova Reid in the first minute of added time with a Jamie Vardy assist. Then, on 14 December, Leicester dropped down to 17th place in the league after recording their worst loss of the season, a 4–0 away loss to Newcastle United. Leicester then lost their next 2 games against Wolves and Liverpool, which meant that they would be in the relegation zone for the first time in the season. To end off 2024, Leicester City welcomed an out-of-form Manchester City team to the King Power on 29 December 2024. Man City won 2–0 with goals from Savinho in the 21st minute and Erling Haaland in the 74th minute to seal victory for the visitors.

At the mid-way point of the season, and the end of 2024, Leicester City were in 19th place in the league on 14 points, 3 points from safety behind Ipswich and Wolves, both on 16 points.

==== January ====
Leicester's first game of 2025 was an away game to Aston Villa at Villa Park on 4 January 2025. Leicester lost the game 2–1 with Ross Barkley opening the scoring for Villa in the 58th minute, then a Leicester equaliser through Mavididi in the 63rd minute made the score 1–1. Eventually, Leon Bailey netted a 76th-minute winner for the hosts to win the game 2–1 for them. Then, on 11 January, Leicester welcomed QPR to the King Power in an FA Cup Round 3 game. Leicester won the game comfortably by a scoreline of 6–2, with Justin, Mavididi, Buonanotte, Vardy and Faes all netting for Leicester. Then, Leicester welcomed Crystal Palace to the King Power for a Premier League fixture on 15 January. Crystal Palace won 0–2, with goals from Marc Guéhi and Jean-Philippe Mateta to secure a victory for the visitors. Leicester remained 19th in the table, still 3 points adrift from safety. 3 days later, on 18 January, Leicester welcomed Fulham to the King Power for another Premier League fixture. Fulham also ran out 0–2 winners, with goals from Emile Smith Rowe and Adama Traoré securing a win for the visitors. By this point, Leicester had lost 7 games on the bounce, a division-high record. They were still in 19th place, 3 points from safety. 8 days later, on 26 January, Leicester travelled to the Tottenham Hotspur Stadium for a Premier League away game against an out of form Tottenham side. If Leicester lost this game, then they would have lost 8 on the bounce in the Premier League for the first time since 2001. However, Leicester managed to stun Tottenham and run out 2–1 winners. A goal from Richarlison gave Tottenham the lead in the 33rd minute, and the score was 1–0 to Tottenham at half-time. However, 58 seconds into the second half, Vardy equalised through a tap in and the score was 1–1. 3 minutes later, El Khannouss scored another goal for Leicester and they were 2–1 up. This remained the score until the end. This gave Leicester their 2nd away win of the season in the Premier League (the first being against Southampton in October) and their first away win vs Tottenham since December 2020. This result also moved Leicester outside of the relegation zone by 1 point, in 17th place. This also broke a 7-game losing streak in the league and an 8-game winless run overall in the league. This was their first win since a 3–1 victory over West Ham on 3 December 2024.

By the end of January, Leicester were 17th in the league on 17 points, 1 point above the relegation zone.

==== February ====
Leicester began February by losing 4–0 away to Everton and coupled with Wolves 2–0 win over Aston Villa, the foxes dropped back into the relegation zone two points behind Wolves. Leicester's next game was against Manchester United in the FA Cup fourth round at Old Trafford. Bobby De Cordova-Reid opened the scoring in the 42nd minute but Joshua Zirkzee equalised for United in the 68th minute before Harry Maguire scored a winner in stoppage time even though he was offside but due to the lack of VAR the goal was given incorrectly sending Leicester out of the FA Cup. Rudd Van Nistelrooy was furious saying "We weren't defeated in Fergie time, we were defeated in offside time."

Leicester then faced Arsenal at home on 15 February. They lost the match 2-0 extending their run of home defeats without scoring to 5 games and meant they stayed in the relegation zone. Leicester then played Brentford at home 6 days later, losing 4–0. This extended their run of home defeats without scoring to 6 games and coupled with Wolves win over Bournemouth meant Leicester were now 5 points off safety with 12 games left to play.

Leicester's next game was away to West Ham which saw them lose 2–0, meaning the foxes hadn't scored a goal since the 2–1 win over Tottentham on 26 January.

By the end of February, Leicester were 19th in the league with 17 points, 5 points off safety.

==== March ====
Leicester first game in March was away to Chelsea with Leicester losing 1–0. This meant they dropped 6 points off safety after Wolves drew the previous day decreasing their chances of staying in the Premier league. Leicester then played Manchester United at the king power stadium, losing 3–0. With 17th placed Wolves winning 2–1 against bottom side Southampton Leicester now sat 9 points off safety. The defeat also meant the foxes equalled the record of home losses without scoring of 7.

By the end of March, Leicester were 19th in the league with 17 points, 9 points off safety.

==== April ====
Leicester began April by losing 2–0 away to reigning champions Manchester City. The defeat kept up their goalless run since January and meant with Wolves winning 1–0 against West Ham, that Leicester were now 12 points off safety with 8 games left to play.

Leicester then faced Newcastle United at home on 7 April. they lost 3–0, meaning the foxes had now lost 8 games in a row at home without scoring, setting a new record in English Football. With Wolves winning again, Leicester were now 15 points off safety with 7 games left to play making their chances of survival slimmer and slimmer.

Leicester then faced Brighton & Hove Albion away from home knowing they needed to win to start a push for safety. João Pedro opened the scoring with a penalty in the 31st minute before Stephy Mavididi equalised for the foxes, scoring the club's first goal since the win over Tottenham in late January. Brighton would retake the lead with another penalty from João Pedro but Leicester would equalise again through Caleb Okoli with the game finishing as a 2–2 draw. This ended Leicester's run of 8 defeats in a row but with Wolves winning for the 4th game in a row the next day, Leicester were now 17 points off safety with 6 games left to play meaning unless they won their next game against league leaders Liverpool they would be relegated.

With Wolves beating Manchester United on 20 April, Leicester went into their match against Liverpool at the king power knowing anything other than a win would send them down to the championship. Leicester would defend well in the first half and even put the ball in the net in the 2nd half but the goal was ruled out due to a foul of Liverpool goalkeeper Alisson Becker. Trent Alexander Arnold would then come off the bench and score the winner in the 76th minute to give Liverpool the points. The 1–0 defeat confirmed Leicester's relegation back to the championship as they were 20 points off safety with only 5 games left to play and extended the foxes run of home defeats without scoring to 9 games and made the foxes the first team in English Football history to fail to score in 9 consecutive home games.

The day after the defeat to Liverpool Jamie Vardy put out a statement on his Instagram calling Leicester's season a total embarrassment and issuing a heartfelt apology to fans.

On the 24th Of April 2025 3 days after his Instagram statement, Vardy announced he would leave Leicester at the end of the season on the expiry of his contract. Vardy was the last player of Leicester's 2015-16 Premier League title winning squad still at the club.

Leicester's final game of April and the first since Vardy's announcement was away to Wolverhampton Wanderers. Matheus Cunha would open the scoring for the hosts in the 33rd minute with the halftime score 1–0 to Wolves. Jorgen Strand Larsen would make it 2–0 to Wolves in the 56th minute, before Leicester were given a penalty in the 72nd minute after José Sá was deemed to have fouled Vardy in the box. Sa would save the penalty though before Rodrigo Gomes would add a third for the hosts in the 85th minute sending Leicester to a 3–0 defeat. Leicester were now 23 points behind the West Midlands club having been 5 points clear of them when the two sides met at the King Power Stadium in December.

By the end of April Leicester were 19th in the league with 18 points, 18 points off safety.

==== May ====
Leicester's first game in May was against Bottom and fellow relegated side Southampton at the King Power. Jamie Vardy opened the scoring in the 17th minute to score his 199th Leicester goal and Leicester's first home goal since December 8, 2024. Jordan Ayew would score a 2nd in the 44th minute making it 2-0 which would be the final score marking Leicester's first win since 26 January and their first home win since 3 December 2024. This also ended Leicester's 9 match run of home defeats without scoring.

== Players ==
=== Squad information ===
Players and squad numbers last updated on 13 June 2025. Appearances include all competitions.
Note: Flags indicate national team as has been defined under FIFA eligibility rules. Players may hold more than one non-FIFA nationality.

No.	Player	Nat.	Position(s)	Date of birth (age)	Signed in	Contract ends	Signed from	Apps	Goals
Goalkeepers
1	Danny Ward	(Wales)	GK	22 June 1993 (age 33)	2018	2025	(England) Liverpool	52	0
30	Mads Hermansen	(Denmark)	GK	11 July 2000 (age 26)	2023	2028	(Denmark) Brøndby	72	0
31	Daniel Iversen	(Denmark)	GK	19 January 1997 (age 29)	2018	2025	Youth Academy	17	0
41	Jakub Stolarczyk	(Poland)	GK	19 December 2000 (age 25)	2019	2026	Youth Academy	20	0
Defenders
2	James Justin	(England)	LB / RB	23 February 1998 (age 28)	2019	2026	(England) Luton Town	167	11
3	Wout Faes	(Belgium)	CB	3 April 1998 (age 28)	2022	2027	(France) Reims	119	5
4	Conor Coady	(England)	CB	25 February 1993 (age 33)	2023	2026	(England) Wolverhampton Wanderers	43	2
5	Caleb Okoli	(Italy)	CB	13 July 2001 (age 25)	2024	2029	(Italy) Atalanta	23	1
16	Victor Kristiansen	(Denmark)	LB	16 December 2002 (age 23)	2023	2028	(Denmark) Copenhagen	45	0
21	Ricardo Pereira	(Portugal)	RB	6 October 1993 (age 33)	2018	2026	(Portugal) Porto	181	13
23	Jannik Vestergaard	(Denmark)	CB	3 August 1992 (age 34)	2021	2027	(England) Southampton	86	2
25	Woyo Coulibaly	(France)	RB	26 May 1999 (age 27)	2025	2029	(Italy) Parma	5	0
33	Luke Thomas	(England)	LB	10 June 2001 (age 25)	2020	2026	Youth Academy	103	2
77	Olabade Aluko	(England)	LB / RB	30 November 2006 (age 19)	2025	–	Youth Academy	1	0
Midfielders
6	Wilfred Ndidi	(Nigeria)	DM / CM	16 December 1996 (age 29)	2017	2027	(Belgium) Genk	303	18
8	Harry Winks	(England)	CM	2 February 1996 (age 30)	2023	2026	(England) Tottenham Hotspur	73	3
11	Bilal El Khannouss	(Morocco)	AM	10 May 2004 (age 22)	2024	2028	(Belgium) Genk	36	3
22	Oliver Skipp	(England)	DM	16 September 2000 (age 26)	2024	2029	(England) Tottenham Hotspur	28	0
24	Boubakary Soumaré	(France)	DM	27 February 1999 (age 27)	2021	2026	(France) Lille	94	0
34	Michael Golding	(England)	CM	23 March 2006 (age 20)	2024	2028	(England) Chelsea	1	0
35	Kasey McAteer	(Republic of Ireland)	AM / RW	22 November 2001 (age 24)	2021	2028	Youth Academy	53	8
40	Facundo Buonanotte	(Argentina)	AM	23 December 2004 (age 21)	2024	2025	(England) Brighton & Hove Albion (on loan)	35	6
Attackers
7	Abdul Fatawu	(Ghana)	RW / LW / AM	8 March 2004 (age 22)	2023	2029	(Portugal) Sporting CP	56	7
9	Jamie Vardy	(England)	ST	11 January 1987 (age 39)	2012	2025	(England) Fleetwood Town	500	200
10	Stephy Mavididi	(England)	LW	31 May 1998 (age 28)	2023	2028	(France) Montpellier	81	19
14	Bobby De Cordova-Reid	(Jamaica)	LW / RW	2 February 1993 (age 33)	2024	2027	(England) Fulham	27	2
18	Jordan Ayew	(Ghana)	ST	11 September 1991 (age 35)	2024	2026	(England) Crystal Palace	35	6
20	Patson Daka	(Zambia)	ST	9 October 1998 (age 28)	2021	2026	(Austria) Red Bull Salzburg	121	23
29	Odsonne Édouard	(France)	ST	16 January 1998 (age 28)	2024	2025	(England) Crystal Palace (on loan)	6	0
91	Jake Evans	(England)	ST / RW	21 August 2008 (age 18)	2025	–	Youth Academy	4	0
93	Jeremy Monga	(England)	LW / RW	10 July 2009 (age 17)	2025	–	Youth Academy	7	0
Out on loan
15	Harry Souttar	(Australia)	CB	22 October 1998 (age 28)	2023	2028	(England) Stoke City	16	0
17	Hamza Choudhury	(Bangladesh)	DM / RB / LB	1 October 1997 (age 29)	2015	2027	Youth Academy	131	2
26	Ben Nelson	(England)	CB	18 March 2004 (age 22)	2020	2027	Youth Academy	8	1
27	Wanya Marçal	(Portugal)	LW / RW	19 October 2002 (age 24)	2022	2026	Youth Academy	9	1
37	Will Alves	(England)	AM	4 May 2005 (age 21)	2022	2028	Youth Academy	5	0
47	Arjan Raikhy	(England)	CM	20 October 2002 (age 24)	2023	–	Youth Academy	3	0
48	Chris Popov	(Wales)	ST	26 October 2004 (age 22)	2024	–	Youth Academy	1	0
58	Brandon Cover	(Jamaica)	DM	25 September 2003 (age 23)	2024	–	Youth Academy	1	0

== Transfers ==
=== In ===
Date	Position	Nationality	Player	From	Fee	Team	Ref.
1 July 2024	RW	(Ghana)	Abdul Fatawu	(Portugal) Sporting CP	£14,400,000	First team	
6 July 2024	RW	(Jamaica)	Bobby De Cordova-Reid	(England) Fulham	Free	First team	
7 July 2024	CM	(England)	Michael Golding	(England) Chelsea	£5,000,000	First team	
9 July 2024	CB	(Italy)	Caleb Okoli	(Italy) Atalanta	£13,000,000	First team	
19 August 2024	DM	(England)	Oliver Skipp	(England) Tottenham Hotspur	£20,000,000	First team	
23 August 2024	FW	(Ghana)	Jordan Ayew	(England) Crystal Palace	£5,000,000	First team	
29 August 2024	AM	(Morocco)	Bilal El Khannouss	(Belgium) Genk	£20,000,000	First team	
15 January 2025	RB	(France)	Woyo Coulibaly	(Italy) Parma	£3,000,000	First team	

=== Out ===
Date	Position	Nationality	Player	To	Fee	Team	Ref.
30 June 2024	RM	(England)	Marc Albrighton	Retired		First team	
30 June 2024	CB	(Netherlands)	Paul Appiah	(England) Chelmsford City	Released	Academy	
30 June 2024	GK	(Republic of Ireland)	Arlo Doherty	(Republic of Ireland) Derry City	Released	Academy	
30 June 2024	LB	(Republic of Ireland)	Shane Flynn	(Republic of Ireland) Waterford	Released	Academy	
30 June 2024	RB	(Wales)	Iestyn Hughes	(England) South Shields	Released	Academy	
30 June 2024	CF	(Nigeria)	Kelechi Iheanacho	(Spain) Sevilla	End of contract	First team	
30 June 2024	CM	(England)	Jack Lewis	(United States) Louisville Cardinals	Released	Academy	
30 June 2024	LW	(Zimbabwe)	Tawanda Maswanhise	(Scotland) Motherwell	Released	Academy	
30 June 2024	CM	(Belgium)	Dennis Praet	(Belgium) Royal Antwerp	End of contract	First team	
2 July 2024	CB	(England)	Lewis Brunt	(Wales) Wrexham	Undisclosed	Academy	
2 July 2024	CM	(England)	Kiernan Dewsbury-Hall	(England) Chelsea	£30,000,000	First team	
28 August 2024	RW	(United States)	Zach Booth	(Netherlands) Excelsior	Undisclosed	Academy	
23 January 2025	ST	(Republic of Ireland)	Tom Cannon	(England) Sheffield United	£10,000,000	First team	

=== Loaned in ===
Date	Position	Nationality	Player	From	Date until	Team	Ref.
10 August 2024	AM	(Argentina)	Facundo Buonanotte	(England) Brighton & Hove Albion	End of season	First team	
31 August 2024	ST	(France)	Odsonne Édouard	(England) Crystal Palace	End of season	First team	

=== Loaned out ===
Date	Position	Nationality	Player	To	Date until	Team	Ref.
26 July 2024	RW	(England)	Silko Thomas	(England) Wigan Athletic	End of Season	Academy	
6 August 2024	CB	(Australia)	Harry Souttar	(England) Sheffield United	End of Season	First team	
28 August 2024	DM	(England)	Sammy Braybrooke	(Scotland) Dundee	13 January 2025 (Note: On 13 January, Braybrooke returned back early from his season-long loan at Dundee)	First team	
29 August 2024	RW	(England)	Amani Richards	(England) Exeter City	15 January 2025 (Note: On 15 January, Richards returned back early from his season-long loan at Exeter City)	Academy	
30 August 2024	ST	(Republic of Ireland)	Tom Cannon	(England) Stoke City	15 January 2025 (Note: On 15 January, Cannon returned back early from his season-long loan at Stoke City)	First team	
30 August 2024	DM	(Jamaica)	Brandon Cover	(England) Port Vale	22 January 2025 (Note: On 22 January, Cover returned back early from his season-long loan at Port Vale)	Academy	
30 August 2024	RW	(Portugal)	Wanya Marçal	(Netherlands) De Graafschap	End of Season	First team	
30 August 2024	CB	(England)	Ben Nelson	(England) Oxford United	End of Season	First team	
30 August 2024	AM	(Wales)	Chris Popov	(England) Barrow	End of Season	Academy	
30 August 2024	GK	(England)	Brad Young	(England) Hartlepool United	3 February 2025 (Note: On 3 February, Young returned back early from his season-long loan at Hartlepool United)	Academy	
27 January 2025	DM	(Bangladesh)	Hamza Choudhury	(England) Sheffield United	End of Season	First team	
31 January 2025	DM	(Jamaica)	Brandon Cover	(England) Fleetwood Town	End of Season	Academy	
31 January 2025	CB	(England)	Ben Grist	(England) Worksop Town	End of Season	Academy	
3 February 2025	AM	(England)	Will Alves	(Wales) Cardiff City	End of Season	First team	
3 February 2025	CB	(England)	Tom Wilson-Brown	(Scotland) Kilmarnock	End of Season	Academy	
3 February 2025	DM	(England)	Arjan Raikhy	(England) Tamworth	End of Season	Academy	
3 February 2025	AM	(Wales)	Oliver Ewing	(England) Buxton	End of Season	Academy	

== Pre-season and friendlies ==
On 22 June, Leicester City announced their first pre-season friendly, versus Shrewsbury Town. Two weeks later, a third fixture was confirmed, against FC Augsburg. On 15 July, a fourth friendly was added, against Palermo in Chesterfield.

Win Draw Loss Fixtures

20 July 2024 Friendly	Villarreal	1–2	Leicester City	Évian-les-Bains, France
16:00 CEST (15:00 BST)	Ndidi 30' (o.g.)	Report	Vardy 25'; Mavididi 80'	Stadium: Camille Fournier Stadium; Attendance: 0 (Behind closed doors)
Note: Match was played in two periods of sixty minutes each.

23 July 2024 Friendly	Shrewsbury Town	1–2	Leicester City	Shrewsbury
19:45 BST	Okoli 51' (o.g.)	Report	Mavididi 27'; McAteer 52'	Stadium: New Meadow

26 July 2024 Friendly	Leicester City	0–1	Palermo	Chesterfield
19:00 BST	Soumaré (yellow card) 6'	Report	Di Francesco 60'	Stadium: SMH Group Stadium; Referee: Nicholas Hopton (England)

3 August 2024 Friendly	FC Augsburg	1–0	Leicester City	Kempten, Germany
15:30 CEST (14:30 BST)	Schlotterbeck 10'	Report		Stadium: Illerstadion; Attendance: 4,000

10 August 2024 Friendly	Lens	3–0	Leicester City	Lens, France
16:00 CEST (15:00 BST)	Danso 47'; Fulgini 52', 56'	Report	Ndidi (yellow card) 51'	Stadium: Stade Bollaert-Delelis; Attendance: 33,537

== Competitions ==
=== Overall record ===
Competition	First match	Last match	Starting round	Final position	Record							
Competition	First match	Last match	Starting round	Final position	Pld	W	D	L	GF	GA	GD	Win %
Premier League	19 August 2024	25 May 2025	Matchday 1	18th	38	6	7	25	33	80	−47	15.79
FA Cup	11 January 2025	7 February 2025	Third round	Fourth round	2	1	0	1	7	4	+3	50.00
EFL Cup	27 August 2024	30 October 2024	Second round	Fourth round	3	1	1	1	6	5	+1	33.33
Total					43	8	8	27	46	89	−43	18.60

Source: Soccerway

=== Premier League ===
==== League table ====
Pos	Team	Pld	W	D	L	GF	GA	GD	Pts	Qualification or relegation
16	Wolverhampton Wanderers	38	12	6	20	54	69	−15	42	
17	Tottenham Hotspur	38	11	5	22	64	65	−1	38	Qualification for the Champions League league phase (Note: Tottenham Hotspur qualified for the Champions League league phase as the 2024–25 UEFA Europa League winners.)
18	Leicester City (R)	38	6	7	25	33	80	−47	25	Relegation to EFL Championship
19	Ipswich Town (R)	38	4	10	24	36	82	−46	22	Relegation to EFL Championship
20	Southampton (R)	38	2	6	30	26	86	−60	12	Relegation to EFL Championship

Source: Premier League
Rules for classification: 1) Points; 2) Goal difference; 3) Goals scored; 4) If the champions, relegated teams or qualified teams for UEFA competitions cannot be determined by rules 1 to 3, rules 4.1 to 4.3 are applied – 4.1) Points gained in head-to-head record between such teams; 4.2) Away goals scored in head-to-head record between such teams; 4.3) Play-offs
(R) Relegated

==== Results summary ====
Overall								Home						Away					
Pld	W	D	L	GF	GA	GD	Pts	W	D	L	GF	GA	GD	W	D	L	GF	GA	GD
38	6	7	25	33	80	−47	25	4	3	12	15	34	−19	2	4	13	18	46	−28

Source: Soccerway

==== Score overview ====
Win Draw Loss

Opposition	Home score	Away score	Aggregate score	Double
Arsenal	0–2	2–4	2–6	No
Aston Villa	1–2	1–2	2–4	No
Bournemouth	1–0	0–2	1–2	No
Brentford	0–4	1–4	1–8	No
Brighton & Hove Albion	2–2	2–2	4–4	No
Chelsea	1–2	0–1	1–3	No
Crystal Palace	0–2	2–2	2–4	No
Everton	1–1	0–4	1–5	No
Fulham	0–2	1–2	1–4	No
Ipswich Town	2–0	1–1	3–1	No
Liverpool	0–1	1–3	1–4	No
Manchester City	0–2	0–2	0–4	No
Manchester United	0–3	0–3	0–6	No
Newcastle United	0–3	0–4	0–7	No
Nottingham Forest	1–3	2–2	3–5	No
Southampton	2–0	3–2	5–2	✓
Tottenham Hotspur	1–1	2–1	3–2	No
West Ham United	3–1	0–2	3–3	No
Wolverhampton Wanderers	0–3	0–3	0–6	No

==== Results by round ====
Round	1	2	3	4	5	6	7	8	9	10	11	12	13	14	15	16	17	18	19	20	21	22	23	24	25	26	27	28	29	30	31	32	33	34	35	36	37	38
Ground	H	A	H	A	H	A	H	A	H	A	A	H	A	H	H	A	H	A	H	A	H	H	A	A	H	H	A	A	H	A	H	A	H	A	H	A	H	A
Result	D	L	L	D	D	L	W	W	L	D	L	L	L	W	D	L	L	L	L	L	L	L	W	L	L	L	L	L	L	L	L	D	L	L	W	D	W	L
Position	10	15	15	15	15	17	15	14	15	15	15	16	16	16	16	17	17	18	19	19	19	19	17	18	19	19	19	19	19	19	19	19	19	19	19	19	18	18
Points	1	1	1	2	3	3	6	9	9	10	10	10	10	13	14	14	14	14	14	14	14	14	17	17	17	17	17	17	17	17	17	18	18	18	21	22	25	25

Source: Premier League
A = Away; H = Home; W = Win; D = Draw; L = Loss; P = Postponed

==== Matches ====
On 18 June, the Premier League fixtures were released.

Win Draw Loss Fixtures

19 August 2024 1	Leicester City	1–1	Tottenham Hotspur	Leicester
20:00 BST	Vardy 57'; Faes (yellow card) 90+9'	Report	Porro 29'; Bentancur (yellow card) 64'	Stadium: King Power Stadium; Attendance: 31,977; Referee: Chris Kavanagh
Note: Live on Sky Sports

24 August 2024 2	Fulham	2–1	Leicester City	Fulham
15:00 BST	Smith Rowe 18'; Iwobi 70'; Wilson (yellow card) 72'; Cairney (yellow card) 90+2'	Report	Faes 38'; Kristiansen (yellow card) 59'; Vestergaard (yellow card) 90+5'	Stadium: Craven Cottage; Attendance: 25,401; Referee: Darren Bond

31 August 2024 3	Leicester City	1–2	Aston Villa	Leicester
15:00 BST	Skipp (yellow card) 26'; Buonanotte 73'; Okoli (yellow card) 74'; Vardy (yellow card) 83'; Winks (yellow card) 90+3'	Report	Onana (yellow card) 8', (goal) 28'; Tielemans (yellow card) 40'; Bogarde (yellow card) 55'; Durán 63', (yellow card) 90+2'; McGinn (yellow card) 74'	Stadium: King Power Stadium; Attendance: 31,725; Referee: David Coote

14 September 2024 4	Crystal Palace	2–2	Leicester City	Selhurst
15:00 BST	Mateta 47', 90+2' (pen.)	Report	Vardy 21'; Mavididi 46'; Ndidi (yellow card) 52'; Ayew (yellow card) 79'; Coady (yellow card) 90+1'	Stadium: Selhurst Park; Attendance: 25,124; Referee: Tony Harrington

21 September 2024 5	Leicester City	1–1	Everton	Leicester
15:00 BST	Mavididi 73'; Buonanotte (yellow card) 77'	Report	Ndiaye 12'; Keane (yellow card) 46'; Garner (yellow card) 80'	Stadium: King Power Stadium; Attendance: 31,765; Referee: Darren England

28 September 2024 6	Arsenal	4–2	Leicester City	Holloway
15:00 BST	Martinelli 20'; Trossard 45+1'; Saliba (yellow card) 46'; Calafiori (yellow card) 49'; Ndidi 90+4' (o.g.); Havertz 90+9'	Report	Vardy (yellow card) 21'; Ndidi (yellow card) 31'; Justin 47', 63'; Skipp (yellow card) 50'; Buonanotte (yellow card) 70'	Stadium: Emirates Stadium; Attendance: 60,323; Referee: Sam Barrott

5 October 2024 7	Leicester City	1–0	Bournemouth	Leicester
15:00 BST	Buonanotte 16'; Ayew (yellow card) 40'; Ndidi (yellow card) 50'; Justin (yellow card) 64'; Soumaré (yellow card) 90+2'	Report	Senesi (yellow card) 84'	Stadium: King Power Stadium; Attendance: 31,706; Referee: Darren Bond

19 October 2024 8	Southampton	2–3	Leicester City	Southampton
15:00 BST	Manning (yellow card) 6'; Archer 8'; Fernandes (yellow card) 10'; Aribo 28'; Harwood-Bellis (yellow card) 33'; Dibling (yellow card) 36'; Sugawara (yellow card) 49'; Fraser (red card) 73'	Report	Vardy (yellow card) 52', (goal) 74' (pen.); Buonanotte (yellow card) 62', (goal) 64'; Winks (yellow card) 70'; Ayew 90+8'	Stadium: St Mary's Stadium; Attendance: 31,145; Referee: Anthony Taylor
Note: Live on Sky Sports

25 October 2024 9	Leicester City	1–3	Nottingham Forest	Leicester
20:00 BST	Vardy 23'; Pereira (yellow card) 35'; Mavididi (yellow card) 46'; Winks (yellow card) 58'; Ayew (yellow card) 88'; Soumaré (yellow card) 90+3'	Report	Yates 16'; Moreno (yellow card) 41'; Wood 47', 60'; Domínguez (yellow card) 78'; Milenković (yellow card) 90+5'	Stadium: King Power Stadium; Attendance: 31,879; Referee: Craig Pawson
Note: Fixture was initially scheduled for 26 October, but was moved for live Sky Sports broadcast.

2 November 2024 10	Ipswich Town	1–1	Leicester City	Ipswich
15:00 GMT	Phillips (yellow card) 44' (yellow-red card) 77'; Davis 55'; Chaplin (yellow card) 81'; Muric (yellow card) 84'; Cajuste (yellow card) 87'; Hirst (yellow card) 89'	Report	Buonanotte (yellow card) 22'; Mavididi (yellow card) 59'; Ayew 90+4'	Stadium: Portman Road; Attendance: 29,874; Referee: Tim Robinson

10 November 2024 11	Manchester United	3–0	Leicester City	Trafford
14:00 GMT	Fernandes 17'; Kristiansen 38' (o.g.); Garnacho 82'	Report	Buonanotte (yellow card) 63'	Stadium: Old Trafford; Attendance: 73,829; Referee: Peter Bankes
Note: Fixture was initially scheduled for 9 November, but was moved due to Manchester United's participation in the UEFA Europa League.

23 November 2024 12	Leicester City	1–2	Chelsea	Leicester
12:30 GMT	Ndidi (yellow card) 22'; Soumaré (yellow card) 29'; Skipp (yellow card) 31'; Faes (yellow card) 78'; Ayew 90+5' (pen.)	Report	Jackson 15'; Caicedo (yellow card) 40'; Sánchez (yellow card) 66'; Fernández 75'; Lavia (yellow card) 90+4'	Stadium: King Power Stadium; Attendance: 31,880; Referee: Andrew Madley
Note: Fixture was initially scheduled for a 15:00 kick-off, but was moved for live TNT Sports broadcast.

30 November 2024 13	Brentford	4–1	Leicester City	Brentford
15:00 GMT	Wissa 25'; Schade 29', 45+8', 59'; Lewis-Potter (yellow card) 63'	Report	Buonanotte 21'; Justin (yellow card) 82'	Stadium: Brentford Community Stadium; Attendance: 17,084; Referee: Michael Oliver

3 December 2024 14	Leicester City	3–1	West Ham United	Leicester
20:15 GMT	Vardy 2', (yellow card) 37'; Soumaré (yellow card) 22'; El Khannouss 61'; Daka 90'	Report	Coufal (yellow card) 45+2'; Álvarez (yellow card) 76'; Füllkrug 90+3'	Stadium: King Power Stadium; Attendance: 30,947; Referee: Josh Smith
Note: Fixture was initially scheduled for a 19:45 kick-off, but was moved for live Amazon Prime Video broadcasting.

8 December 2024 15	Leicester City	2–2	Brighton & Hove Albion	Leicester
14:00 GMT	Vardy 86'; Soumaré (yellow card) 87'; De Cordova-Reid 90+1'	Report	Lamptey 37'; Baleba (yellow card) 41'; Wieffer (yellow card) 74'; Minteh 79'	Stadium: King Power Stadium; Attendance: 31,647; Referee: Stuart Attwell
Note: Fixture was initially scheduled for 7 December, but was pushed back a day.

14 December 2024 16	Newcastle United	4–0	Leicester City	Newcastle upon Tyne
15:00 GMT	Murphy 30', 60', (yellow card) 35'; Bruno Guimarães (yellow card) 39', (goal) 47'; Isak 50'; Joelinton (yellow card) 71'	Report	Skipp (yellow card) 20'; Vestergaard (yellow card) 90+2'; Okoli (yellow card) 90+6'	Stadium: St James' Park; Attendance: 52,235; Referee: Thomas Bramall

22 December 2024 17	Leicester City	0–3	Wolverhampton Wanderers	Leicester
14:00 GMT	Vestergaard (yellow card) 22'; Soumaré (yellow card) 26'	Report	Guedes 19'; Gomes 36'; Cunha 44'	Stadium: King Power Stadium; Attendance: 31,818; Referee: Anthony Taylor
Note: Fixture was initially scheduled for 21 December, but was moved following advice from local authorities due to a clash with Leicester Tigers also having a home fixture.

26 December 2024 18	Liverpool	3–1	Leicester City	Liverpool
20:00 GMT	Gomez (yellow card) 37'; Gakpo 45+1'; Jones 49'; Robertson (yellow card) 58'; Szoboszlai (yellow card) 80'; Salah 82'	Report	Ayew 6', (yellow card) 43'; Vestergaard (yellow card) 58'	Stadium: Anfield; Attendance: 60,300; Referee: Darren Bond
Note: Fixture was initially scheduled for a 19:45 kick-of, but was moved for live Amazon Prime Video broadcasting.

29 December 2024 19	Leicester City	0–2	Manchester City	Leicester
14:30 GMT	Soumaré (yellow card) 56'; El Khannouss (yellow card) 65'	Report	Savinho 21'; Haaland 74'; Ortega (yellow card) 78'	Stadium: King Power Stadium; Attendance: 32,057; Referee: Michael Oliver
Note: Fixture was initially scheduled for a 15:00 kick-off, but was moved for live Sky Sports broadcasting.

4 January 2025 20	Aston Villa	2–1	Leicester City	Birmingham
15:00 GMT	Barkley 58'; Bailey 76'	Report	Mavididi 63'; Soumaré (yellow card) 90+5'	Stadium: Villa Park; Attendance: 42,386; Referee: Jarred Gillett

15 January 2025 21	Leicester City	0–2	Crystal Palace	Leicester
19:30 GMT		Report	Mateta 52'; Guéhi 78'	Stadium: King Power Stadium; Attendance: 29,766; Referee: Andrew Madley
Note: Fixture was initially scheduled for 14 January, but was moved for live TNT Sports broadcasting.

18 January 2025 22	Leicester City	0–2	Fulham	Leicester
15:00 GMT	Vestergaard (yellow card) 44'; McAteer (yellow card) 88'; Faes (yellow card) 90+4'	Report	Smith Rowe 48'; Lukić (yellow card) 54'; Traoré 68'	Stadium: King Power Stadium; Attendance: 31,500; Referee: Michael Salisbury

26 January 2025 23	Tottenham Hotspur	1–2	Leicester City	Tottenham
14:00 GMT	Richarlison 33'; Reguilón (yellow card) 69'	Report	Vardy 46'; El Khannouss 50'; De Cordova-Reid (yellow card) 61'; Justin (yellow card) 71'; Winks (yellow card) 75'; Buonanotte (yellow card) 78'; Stolarczyk (yellow card) 82'	Stadium: Tottenham Hotspur Stadium; Attendance: 61,295; Referee: Robert Jones
Note: Fixture was initially scheduled for 25 January, but was moved due to Tottenham's UEFA Europa League involvement on the Thursday prior.

1 February 2025 24	Everton	4–0	Leicester City	Liverpool
15:00 GMT	Doucouré 1'; Beto 6', 45+2'; Ndiaye 90'	Report		Stadium: Goodison Park; Attendance: 39,376; Referee: Darren Bond

15 February 2025 25	Leicester City	0–2	Arsenal	Leicester
12:30 GMT	El Khannouss (yellow card) 46'; Ayew (yellow card) 57'	Report	Merino 81', 87'; Jorginho (yellow card) 86'	Stadium: King Power Stadium; Attendance: 31,968; Referee: Sam Barrott
Note: Fixture was initially scheduled for a 15:00 kick-off, but was moved for live TNT Sports broadcasting.

21 February 2025 26	Leicester City	0–4	Brentford	Leicester
20:00 GMT	De Cordova-Reid (yellow card) 28'; Coulibaly (yellow card) 42'; Okoli (yellow card) 45'; Buonanotte (yellow card) 67'	Report	Wissa 17'; Mbeumo 27'; Nørgaard 32'; Carvalho 89'	Stadium: King Power Stadium; Attendance: 31,077; Referee: Tony Harrington
Note: Fixture was initially scheduled for 22 February, but was moved for live Sky Sports broadcasting.

27 February 2025 27	West Ham United	2–0	Leicester City	Stratford
20:00 GMT	Souček 21'; Vestergaard 43' (o.g.)	Report		Stadium: London Stadium; Attendance: 62,455; Referee: Anthony Taylor
Note: Fixture was initially scheduled for 25 February, but was moved for live TNT Sports broadcast.

9 March 2025 28	Chelsea	1–0	Leicester City	Fulham
14:00 GMT	Palmer (penalty missed) 22'; Cucurella 60'; Acheampong (yellow card) 90+6'	Report		Stadium: Stamford Bridge; Attendance: 39,750; Referee: Tim Robinson
Note: Fixture was initially scheduled for 8 March, but was moved due to Chelsea's UEFA Conference League involvements on the preceding Thursday.

16 March 2025 29	Leicester City	0–3	Manchester United	Leicester
19:00 GMT	El Khannouss (yellow card) 33'; Ndidi (yellow card) 77'	Report	Højlund 28'; Garnacho 67'; Fernandes 90'	Stadium: King Power Stadium; Attendance: 31,773; Referee: Thomas Bramall
Note: Fixture was initially scheduled for 15 March, but was moved for live Sky Sports broadcasting.

2 April 2025 30	Manchester City	2–0	Leicester City	Manchester
19:45 BST	Grealish 2'; Marmoush 29'; González (yellow card) 80'	Report	Vardy (yellow card) 34'; Justin (yellow card) 71'; Thomas (yellow card) 77'; Skipp (yellow card) 89'	Stadium: Etihad Stadium; Attendance: 51,983; Referee: Darren England

7 April 2025 31	Leicester City	0–3	Newcastle United	Leicester
20:00 BST	Ndidi (yellow card) 14'; Justin (yellow card) 47'	Report	Murphy 2', 11'; Barnes 34'	Stadium: King Power Stadium; Attendance: 30,403; Referee: Robert Jones
Note: Fixture was initially scheduled for 5 April, but was moved for live Sky Sports broadcasting.

12 April 2025 32	Brighton & Hove Albion	2–2	Leicester City	Brighton and Hove
15:00 BST	João Pedro 31' (pen.), 55' (pen.); Estupiñán (yellow card) 45+1'; Dunk (yellow card) 71'	Report	El Khannouss (yellow card) 8'; Coady (yellow card) 29'; Hermansen (yellow card) 31'; Mavididi 38'; Okoli (yellow card) 63', (goal) 74'; Skipp (yellow card) 68'	Stadium: Falmer Stadium; Attendance: 31,150; Referee: Darren Bond

20 April 2025 33	Leicester City	0–1	Liverpool	Leicester
16:30 BST	Ndidi (yellow card) 70'	Report	Bradley (yellow card) 65'; Alexander-Arnold 76', (yellow card) 77'	Stadium: King Power Stadium; Attendance: 30,402; Referee: Stuart Attwell
Note: Fixture was initially scheduled for 19 April, but was moved for live Sky Sports broadcasting.

26 April 2025 34	Wolverhampton Wanderers	3–0	Leicester City	Wolverhampton
15:00 BST	Toti (yellow card) 16'; Cunha 33'; Larsen 56'; Gomes 85'	Report	Faes (yellow card) 48'; McAteer (yellow card) 61'; Ndidi (yellow card) 65'; Vardy (penalty missed) 72'; Skipp (yellow card) 81'	Stadium: Molineux Stadium; Attendance: 31,518; Referee: Sam Barrott

3 May 2025 35	Leicester City	2–0	Southampton	Leicester
15:00 BST	Vardy 17'; Ayew 44'; Skipp (yellow card) 68'	Report	Sulemana (yellow card) 52'; Ugochukwu (yellow card) 66'; Harwood-Bellis (yellow card) 75'	Stadium: King Power Stadium; Attendance: 31,240; Referee: David Webb/Sam Barrott
Note: In the 21st minute of the match, starting referee David Webb's head collided with the shoulder of Leicester player Jordan Ayew. Following concussion protocol, Webb was replaced by Sam Barrott.

11 May 2025 36	Nottingham Forest	2–2	Leicester City	West Bridgford
14:15 BST	Gibbs-White 25'; Wood 56'; Morato (yellow card) 60'; Aina (yellow card) 69'; Anderson (yellow card) 73'	Report	Coady 16'; Justin (yellow card) 39'; Thomas (yellow card) 58'; Buonanotte (yellow card) 79', (goal) 81'	Stadium: City Ground; Attendance: 30,254; Referee: Tony Harrington
Note: Fixture was initially scheduled for 10 May, but was moved for live Sky Sports broadcasting.

18 May 2025 37	Leicester City	2–0	Ipswich Town	Leicester
15:00 BST	Vardy 28'; McAteer (yellow card) 46', (goal) 69'	Report		Stadium: King Power Stadium; Attendance: 31,986; Referee: Andrew Kitchen

25 May 2025 38	Bournemouth	2–0	Leicester City	Bournemouth
16:00 BST	Semenyo 74', 88'	Report	Thomas (yellow card) 16'; Coady (yellow card) 38'	Stadium: Vitality Stadium; Attendance: 11,238; Referee: Lewis Smith

=== FA Cup ===
Leicester City entered the FA Cup in the third round, and won at home against Queens Park Rangers. They were then drawn away to defending champions Manchester United in the fourth round.

Win Draw Loss Fixtures

11 January 2025 Third round	Leicester City	6–2	Queens Park Rangers	Leicester
14:00 GMT	Justin 8', 63'; Mavididi 35'; Buonanotte 38'; Vardy 51' (pen.); Faes 90+3'	Report	Varane 18'; Kolli 45+2'	Stadium: King Power Stadium; Attendance: 28,424; Referee: David Webb
Note: Fixture was initially scheduled for a 15:00 kick-off, but was moved following advice from local authorities due to a clash with Leicester Tigers also having a home fixture later that evening.

7 February 2025 Fourth round	Manchester United	2–1	Leicester City	Trafford
20:00 GMT	Zirkzee 68'; Ugarte (yellow card) 84'; Maguire 90+3'	Report	De Cordova-Reid 42'	Stadium: Old Trafford; Attendance: 73,693; Referee: Michael Salisbury
Note: Broadcast live on ITV.

=== EFL Cup ===
Leicester entered the EFL Cup in the second round and won at home against Tranmere Rovers. They were then drawn away to Walsall in the third round, before being knocked out of the competition away to Manchester United in the fourth round.

Win Draw Loss Fixtures

27 August 2024 Second round	Leicester City	4–0	Tranmere Rovers	Leicester
19:45 BST	Ayew 38'; Mavididi 51' (pen.); Ndidi 71'; Winks 90'	Report	Davies (yellow card) 66'	Stadium: King Power Stadium; Attendance: 13,011; Referee: Lewis Smith

24 September 2024 Third round	Walsall	0–0 (0–3 p)	Leicester City	Walsall
19:45 BST	Weir (yellow card) 83'; Jellis (yellow card) 90+1'; Gordon (yellow card) 90+5'	Report	Buonanotte (yellow card) 61'; Okoli (yellow card) 88'	Stadium: Bescot Stadium; Attendance: 8,010; Referee: Tom Nield
	Penalties
	Allen (penalty missed); Okagbue (penalty missed); Gordon (penalty missed)		(penalty scored) Pereira; (penalty scored) Coady; (penalty scored) Skipp

30 October 2024 Fourth round	Manchester United	5–2	Leicester City	Trafford
19:45 GMT	Casemiro 15', 39'; Garnacho 28'; Fernandes 36', 59'	Report	Okoli (yellow card) 20'; El Khannouss 33'; Coady 45+3'	Stadium: Old Trafford; Attendance: 73,470; Referee: Andrew Madley

== Statistics ==
=== Appearances ===
As of match played 25 May 2025

Players with no appearances are not included on the list
Italics indicate a loaned in player

No.	Pos	Nat	Player	Total		Premier League		FA Cup		EFL Cup	
No.	Pos	Nat	Player	Apps	Goals	Apps	Goals	Apps	Goals	Apps	Goals
1	GK	(Wales) WAL	Danny Ward	5	0	1+1	0	0	0	3	0
2	DF	(England) ENG	James Justin	39	4	34+2	2	2	2	1	0
3	DF	(Belgium) BEL	Wout Faes	37	2	30+4	1	2	1	1	0
4	DF	(England) ENG	Conor Coady	26	2	19+3	1	1	0	2+1	1
5	DF	(Italy) ITA	Caleb Okoli	23	1	12+7	1	1	0	3	0
6	MF	(Nigeria) NGR	Wilfred Ndidi	30	1	28	0	1	0	1	1
7	FW	(Ghana) GHA	Abdul Fatawu	13	0	6+5	0	0	0	1+1	0
8	MF	(England) ENG	Harry Winks	25	1	17+5	0	1+1	0	1	1
9	FW	(England) ENG	Jamie Vardy	36	10	35	9	1	1	0	0
10	FW	(England) ENG	Stephy Mavididi	33	6	16+14	4	1	1	1+1	1
11	MF	(Morocco) MAR	Bilal El Khannouss	36	3	27+5	2	2	0	1+1	1
14	FW	(Jamaica) JAM	Bobby De Cordova-Reid	27	2	9+14	1	1+1	1	2	0
16	DF	(Denmark) DEN	Victor Kristiansen	31	0	29+1	0	1	0	0	0
18	FW	(Ghana) GHA	Jordan Ayew	35	6	19+11	5	1+1	0	2+1	1
20	FW	(Zambia) ZAM	Patson Daka	25	1	6+17	1	1+1	0	0	0
21	DF	(Portugal) POR	Ricardo Pereira	11	0	4+5	0	0	0	2	0
22	MF	(England) ENG	Oliver Skipp	28	0	10+14	0	0+1	0	2+1	0
23	DF	(Denmark) DEN	Jannik Vestergaard	19	0	16+2	0	0	0	0+1	0
24	MF	(France) FRA	Boubakary Soumaré	35	0	25+6	0	2	0	2	0
25	DF	(France) FRA	Woyo Coulibaly	5	0	1+3	0	0+1	0	0	0
29	FW	(France) FRA	Odsonne Édouard	6	0	0+4	0	0	0	1+1	0
30	GK	(Denmark) DEN	Mads Hermansen	28	0	27	0	1	0	0	0
33	DF	(England) ENG	Luke Thomas	18	0	13+1	0	1	0	3	0
34	MF	(England) ENG	Michael Golding	1	0	0+1	0	0	0	0	0
35	MF	(Republic of Ireland) IRL	Kasey McAteer	23	1	9+9	1	0+2	0	2+1	0
40	MF	(Argentina) ARG	Facundo Buonanotte	34	6	13+17	5	1+1	1	1+1	0
41	GK	(Poland) POL	Jakub Stolarczyk	11	0	10	0	1	0	0	0
77	DF	(England) ENG	Olabade Aluko	1	0	0+1	0	0	0	0	0
91	FW	(England) ENG	Jake Evans	4	0	0+4	0	0	0	0	0
93	FW	(England) ENG	Jeremy Monga	7	0	0+7	0	0	0	0	0
Out on loan:
17	MF	(Bangladesh) BAN	Hamza Choudhury	6	0	1+3	0	0	0	1+1	0
37	MF	(England) ENG	Will Alves	3	0	0+1	0	0	0	0+2	0
48	MF	(Wales) WAL	Chris Popov	1	0	0	0	0	0	0+1	0

=== Goalscorers ===
As of match played 18 May 2025

Rank	No.	Pos.	Nat.	Player	Premier League	FA Cup	EFL Cup	Total
1	9	FW	(England)	Jamie Vardy	9	1	0	10
2=	40	MF	(Argentina)	Facundo Buonanotte	5	1	0	6
2=	18	FW	(Ghana)	Jordan Ayew	5	0	1	6
2=	10	FW	(England)	Stephy Mavididi	4	1	1	6
5	2	DF	(England)	James Justin	2	2	0	4
6	11	MF	(Morocco)	Bilal El Khannouss	2	0	1	3
7=	3	DF	(Belgium)	Wout Faes	1	1	0	2
7=	14	FW	(Jamaica)	Bobby De Cordova-Reid	1	1	0	2
7=	4	DF	(England)	Conor Coady	1	0	1	2
10=	5	DF	(Italy)	Caleb Okoli	1	0	0	1
10=	20	FW	(Zambia)	Patson Daka	1	0	0	1
10=	35	MF	(Republic of Ireland)	Kasey McAteer	1	0	0	1
10=	6	MF	(Nigeria)	Wilfred Ndidi	0	0	1	1
10=	8	MF	(England)	Harry Winks	0	0	1	1
Total					33	7	6	46

=== Assists ===
As of match played 18 May 2025

Rank	No.	Pos.	Nat.	Player	Premier League	FA Cup	EFL Cup	Total
1=	6	MF	(Nigeria)	Wilfred Ndidi	5	0	0	5
1=	11	MF	(Morocco)	Bilal El Khannouss	3	2	0	5
3	9	FW	(England)	Jamie Vardy	4	0	0	4
4=	8	MF	(England)	Harry Winks	2	0	1	3
4=	40	MF	(Argentina)	Facundo Buonanotte	2	1	0	3
6=	2	DF	(England)	James Justin	2	0	0	2
6=	7	FW	(Ghana)	Abdul Fatawu	2	0	0	2
6=	14	FW	(Jamaica)	Bobby De Cordova-Reid	2	0	0	2
9=	10	FW	(England)	Stephy Mavididi	1	0	0	1
9=	16	DF	(Denmark)	Victor Kristiansen	1	0	0	1
9=	35	MF	(Republic of Ireland)	Kasey McAteer	1	0	0	1
9=	20	FW	(Zambia)	Patson Daka	0	1	0	1
9=	17	MF	(Bangladesh)	Hamza Choudhury	0	0	1	1
9=	18	FW	(Ghana)	Jordan Ayew	0	0	1	1
Total					25	4	3	32

=== Clean sheets ===
As of match played 18 May 2025

Rank	No.	Pos.	Nat.	Player	Premier League	FA Cup	EFL Cup	Total
1	41	GK	(Poland)	Jakub Stolarczyk	2	0	0	2
1	1	GK	(Wales)	Danny Ward	0	0	2	2
2	30	GK	(Denmark)	Mads Hermansen	1	0	0	1
Total					3	0	2	5

=== Disciplinary record ===
As of match played 25 May 2025

No.	Pos.	Nat.	Player	Premier League			FA Cup			EFL Cup			Total		
No.	Pos.	Nat.	Player	Yellow card	(yellow card) (yellow-red card)	Red card	Yellow card	(yellow card) (yellow-red card)	Red card	Yellow card	(yellow card) (yellow-red card)	Red card	Yellow card	(yellow card) (yellow-red card)	Red card
2	DF	(England)	James Justin	6	0	0	0	0	0	0	0	0	6	0	0
3	DF	(Belgium)	Wout Faes	4	0	0	0	0	0	0	0	0	4	0	0
4	DF	(England)	Conor Coady	3	0	0	0	0	0	0	0	0	3	0	0
5	DF	(Italy)	Caleb Okoli	4	0	0	0	0	0	2	0	0	6	0	0
6	MF	(Nigeria)	Wilfred Ndidi	8	0	0	0	0	0	0	0	0	8	0	0
8	MF	(England)	Harry Winks	4	0	0	0	0	0	0	0	0	4	0	0
9	FW	(England)	Jamie Vardy	5	0	0	0	0	0	0	0	0	5	0	0
10	FW	(England)	Stephy Mavididi	2	0	0	0	0	0	0	0	0	2	0	0
11	MF	(Morocco)	Bilal El Khannouss	4	0	0	0	0	0	0	0	0	4	0	0
14	FW	(Jamaica)	Bobby De Cordova-Reid	2	0	0	0	0	0	0	0	0	2	0	0
16	DF	(Denmark)	Victor Kristiansen	1	0	0	0	0	0	0	0	0	1	0	0
18	FW	(Ghana)	Jordan Ayew	5	0	0	0	0	0	0	0	0	5	0	0
21	DF	(Portugal)	Ricardo Pereira	1	0	0	0	0	0	0	0	0	1	0	0
22	MF	(England)	Oliver Skipp	8	0	0	0	0	0	0	0	0	8	0	0
23	DF	(Denmark)	Jannik Vestergaard	5	0	0	0	0	0	0	0	0	5	0	0
24	MF	(France)	Boubakary Soumaré	8	0	0	0	0	0	0	0	0	8	0	0
25	DF	(France)	Woyo Coulibaly	1	0	0	0	0	0	0	0	0	1	0	0
30	GK	(Denmark)	Mads Hermansen	1	0	0	0	0	0	0	0	0	1	0	0
33	DF	(England)	Luke Thomas	3	0	0	0	0	0	0	0	0	3	0	0
35	MF	(England)	Kasey McAteer	3	0	0	0	0	0	0	0	0	3	0	0
40	MF	(Argentina)	Facundo Buonanotte	8	0	0	0	0	0	1	0	0	9	0	0
41	GK	(Poland)	Jakub Stolarczyk	1	0	0	0	0	0	0	0	0	1	0	0
Total				87	0	0	0	0	0	3	0	0	90	0	0
