= Liam Davis (footballer, born 1990) =

English footballer

Personal information
- Date of birth: 8 November 1990 (age 35)
- Place of birth: Grimsby, Lincolnshire, England
- Positions: Midfielder; forward

Youth career
- Waltham Juniors
- 2007–2009: Grimsby Town

Senior career*
Years	Team	Apps	(Gls)
2009–2010	Armthorpe Welfare		
2010–2011	Selby Town		
2011–2012	Barton Town Old Boys		
2011–2013	Brigg Town		
2013–2016	Gainsborough Trinity		
2016–2019	Cleethorpes Town		
- * Club domestic league appearances and goals

Liam Davis (born 8 November 1990) is an English former semi-professional footballer. He last played for Cleethorpes Town.

Davis started his career in the Youth teams of home town club Grimsby Town, where he failed to break into the first team. After departing Grimsby Town, he went onto play for Selby Town, Brigg Town, Gainsborough Trinity, and most recently Cleethorpes Town, who he represented in the 2017 FA Vase Final at Wembley.

== Career ==
=== Armthorpe Welfare ===
After being released from Grimsby Town, Davis joined Armthorpe Welfare.

=== Selby Town ===
After a single season at Armthorpe, Davis joined Northern Counties East Premier Division side Selby Town.

=== Barton Town Old Boys ===
Ahead of the 2011–12 season, Davis joined fellow Northern Counties East Premier Division side Barton Town Old Boys.

=== Brigg Town ===
Davis signed for Brigg Town of the Northern Premier League First Division South. Davis was named Brigg's Player of the Season in the 2012–13 season.

=== Gainsborough Trinity ===
Davis joined Gainsborough Trinity on 1 July 2013, who at the time played in the Conference North.

=== Cleethorpes Town ===
On 4 October 2016, Davis joined Cleethorpes Town.

On 21 May 2017, Davis represented Cleethorpes Town in the 2017 FA Vase Final, where Cleethorpes lost 4–0 to South Shields.

In 2018, Davis was invited to take part in the UEFA Equal Game Campaign, which culminated in him playing in a charity match in Lyon, France, sharing the pitch with former international stars Luís Figo and Eric Abidali.

== Personal life ==
In January 2014, Davis became Britain's highest profile openly gay footballer. On 21 May 2017, he became the first openly gay male footballer to play at Wembley when he turned out for Cleethorpes in the FA Vase Final.

In December 2017 Davis publicly criticised comments made by FA chairman Greg Clarke that "professional players who out themselves as homosexual would be taking a risk".

As of 2022, Davis owns a bar and café in Cleethorpes.
