= 2017 FA Vase final =

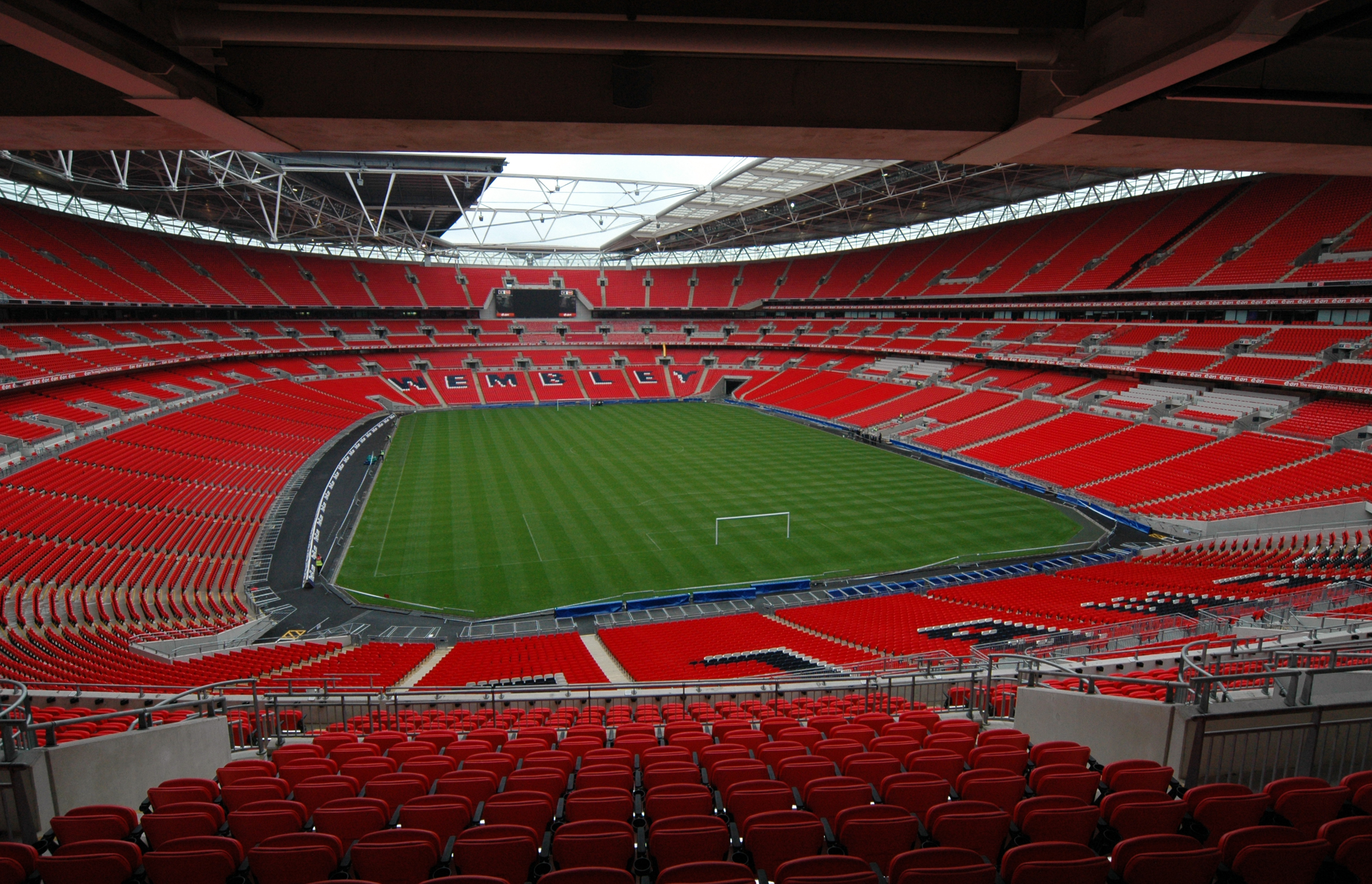
- Wembley Stadium hosted the final
- Event: 2016–17 FA Vase
Cleethorpes Town	South Shields
0	4
- Date: 21 May 2017
- Venue: Wembley Stadium, Wembley, London
- Referee: Darren England
- Attendance: 38,224 (including FA Trophy Final)

The 2016–17 FA Vase final was the 43rd final of the Football Association's cup competition for teams at levels 9–11 of the English football league system. The match was contested between Cleethorpes Town and South Shields. This was first time both teams had reached the final and their first visit to Wembley Stadium. The final of the FA Trophy was played on the same day at the same venue for the second year running. Both matches were televised in the UK on BT Sport.

Cleethorpes Town defeated AFC Emley, Bootle, Billingham Town, Atherton Collieries, Southall and Bromsgrove Sporting en route to the final.

South Shields defeated Esh Winning, Runcorn Linnets, Marske United, Staveley Miners Welfare, last season's champions Morpeth Town, Team Solent, Newport Pagnell Town and Coleshill Town en route to the final.

This match is notable in the history of English football, as it was the first time an openly gay male footballer had taken to the pitch at Wembley, with Cleethorpes Town player Liam Davis having come out two years prior.

== Route to the final ==
=== Cleethorpes Town ===
12 November 2016 2R	AFC Emley	1–2	Cleethorpes Town	Emley
15:00				Stadium: Welfare Ground; Attendance: 215

3 December 2016 3R	Cleethorpes Town	2–1	Bootle	Grimsby
15:00				Stadium: The Bradley Football Development Centre; Attendance: 196

7 January 2017 4R	Billingham Town	1–2	Cleethorpes Town	Billingham
15:00				Stadium: Bedford Terrace; Attendance: 364

28 January 2017 5R	Cleethorpes Town	3–2	Atherton Collieries	Grimsby
15:00				Stadium: The Bradley Football Development Centre; Attendance: 588

18 February 2017 6R	Southall	2–5	Cleethorpes Town	Perivale
15:00				Stadium: Reynolds Field; Attendance: 348

11 March 2017 SF 1st	Bromsgrove Sporting	1–1	Cleethorpes Town	Bromsgrove
15:00				Stadium: Victoria Ground; Attendance: 3,349

18 March 2017 SF 2nd	Cleethorpes Town	1–0 (2–1 agg.)	Bromsgrove Sporting	Grimsby
15:00				Stadium: The Bradley Football Development Centre; Attendance: 1,154

=== South Shields ===
17 October 2016 2RQ	Esh Winning	0–4	South Shields	Esh Winning
15:00				Stadium: West Terrace; Attendance: 266

22 October 2016 1R	South Shields	2–1	Runcorn Linnets	South Shields
15:00				Stadium: Mariners Park; Attendance: 1,060

12 November 2016 2R	South Shields	2–0	Marske United	South Shields
15:00				Stadium: Mariners Park; Attendance: 1,116

3 December 2016 3R	South Shields	3–0	Staveley Miners Welfare	South Shields
15:00				Stadium: Mariners Park; Attendance: 808

7 January 2017 4R	South Shields	A-A*	Morpeth Town	South Shields
15:00				Stadium: Mariners Park; Attendance: 1,545

11 January 2017 4R	South Shields	4–0	Morpeth Town	Morpeth
15:00				Stadium: Craik Park; Attendance: 826

28 January 2017 5R	Team Solent	2–5	South Shields	Southampton
15:00				Stadium: Test Park Sports Ground; Attendance: 638

18 February 2017 6R	South Shields	6–1	Newport Pagnell Town	South Shields
15:00				Stadium: Mariners Park; Attendance: 3,161

11 March 2017 SF 1st	Coleshill Town	1–2	South Shields	Coleshill
15:00				Stadium: Pack Meadow; Attendance: 1,755

18 March 2017 SF 2nd	South Shields	4–0 (6–1 agg.)	Coleshill Town	South Shields
15:00				Stadium: Mariners Park; Attendance: 3,464

* – Match abandoned after floodlight failure in the 81st minute (2–4) – rematch moved to Morpeth Town

== Match ==
=== Details ===
21 May 2017
12:15 BST

Cleethorpes Town	0–4	South Shields
	Report	Finnigan 43' (pen.); Morse 80'; Foley 86', 89'

Wembley Stadium, London
Referee: Darren England

GK	1	Liam Higton
DF	2	Tim Lowe
DF	5	Matt Bloomer
DF	6	Matty Coleman		(substituted off) 70'
DF	3	Peter Winn
MF	7	Liam Davis	(yellow card) 19'	(substituted off) 73'
MF	4	Liam Dickens
MF	8	Alex Flett (c)
MF	11	Jonathan Oglesby
FW	9	Marc Cooper		(substituted off) 61'
FW	10	Brody Robertson
Substitutes:
MF	12	Luck Mascall		(substituted on) 70'
MF	14	Jack Richardson		(substituted on) 73'
FW	15	Andy Taylor		(substituted on) 61'
FW	16	Gary King
DF	17	Kieran Wressel
Manager: Marcus Newell

GK	1	Liam Connell
DF	12	Alex Nicholson
DF	5	Dillon Morse		80'
DF	4	Jon Shaw
DF	3	Darren Lough
MF	19	Andrew Stephenson		(substituted off) 55'
MF	6	Julio Arca (c)
MF	8	Wayne Phillips		(substituted off) 83'
FW	9	Gavin Cogdon		(yellow card) 69'
FW	21	Carl Finnigan	43' (pen)	(substituted off) 70'
FW	11	David Foley	86'	89'
Substitutes:
MF	7	Robert Briggs		(substituted on) 55'
MF	10	Michael Richardson		(substituted on) 70'
DF	16	Louis Storey
DF	17	Barrie Smith		(substituted on) 83'
DF	20	Darren Holden
Joint-Managers: Graham Fenton; Lee Picton

Man of the match: Wayne Phillips

Match rules

- 90 minutes.
- 30 minutes of extra-time if necessary.
- Penalty shoot-out if scores still level.
- Five named substitutes.
- Maximum of three substitutions.
