= 2024–25 Premier League =

Football season in England

Premier League
- Season: 2024–25
- Dates: 16 August 2024 – 25 May 2025
- Champions: Liverpool; 2nd Premier League title 20th English title
- Relegated: Leicester City; Ipswich Town; Southampton
- Champions League: Liverpool; Arsenal; Manchester City; Chelsea; Newcastle United; Tottenham Hotspur (as Europa League winners)
- Europa League: Aston Villa; Nottingham Forest
- Conference League: Crystal Palace (as FA Cup winners)
- Matches: 380
- Goals: 1,115 (2.93 per match)
- Best player: Mohamed Salah
- Top goalscorer: Mohamed Salah (29 goals)
- Best goalkeeper: David Raya; Matz Sels (13 clean sheets each)
- Biggest home win: Nottingham Forest 7–0 Brighton & Hove Albion (1 February 2025)
- Biggest away win: Ipswich Town 0–6 Manchester City (19 January 2025)
- Highest scoring: Tottenham Hotspur 3–6 Liverpool (22 December 2024)
- Longest winning run: 6 matches Newcastle United; Nottingham Forest; Wolverhampton Wanderers
- Longest unbeaten run: 26 matches Liverpool
- Longest winless run: 14 matches Southampton
- Longest losing run: 8 matches Leicester City
- Highest attendance: 73,839; Manchester United 2–0 Aston Villa (25 May 2025)
- Lowest attendance: 11,129; Bournemouth 0–0 Crystal Palace (26 December 2024)
- Total attendance: 15,360,627
- Average attendance: 40,423

The 2024–25 Premier League was the 33rd season of the Premier League and the 126th season of top-flight English football overall. Manchester City entered the season as four-time defending champions, but were dethroned by Liverpool, who emerged as Premier League winners with four games to spare, equalling Manchester United's record of 20 English league titles.

The fixtures were released on 18 June 2024, consisting of 33 weekend rounds, four midweek rounds, and one Bank Holiday matchweek.

The summer transfer window opened on 14 June 2024 and closed at 23:00 BST on 30 August 2024. The winter window opened on 1 January 2025 and closed at 23:00 GMT on 3 February 2025. This was also the last season the Nike sponsor match ball for the top flight was used; Puma became the official ball supplier of the top flight starting from the 2025–26 season.

== Summary ==
The first managerial departure of the season came on 28 October 2024, when Manchester United sacked Erik ten Hag following a 2–1 defeat to West Ham United. The club sat in 14th place after nine games, having already recorded their fourth defeat of the season. Ruben Amorim was announced as his successor on 1 November and officially took charge on 11 November.

The second managerial departure occurred on 24 November, when Leicester City sacked Steve Cooper following a 2–1 home loss to Chelsea. The club sat in 16th place at the time and one point above the relegation zone, having already suffered their sixth loss of the season and having managed only two wins from 12 games. On 29 November, Leicester City announced the appointment of Ruud van Nistelrooy on a three-year contract.

Wolverhampton Wanderers dismissed head coach Gary O'Neil on 15 December after a 2–1 home defeat to Ipswich Town. It was their 11th loss in 16 games; the club was 19th in the table, four points from safety, with only two wins. He was replaced by Vitor Pereira. On the same day, bottom side Southampton sacked Russell Martin immediately after a 5–0 home defeat to Tottenham Hotspur. He was replaced by Ivan Jurić.

On 8 January 2025, West Ham United sacked Julen Lopetegui with the club sitting in 14th place. His final match in charge was a 4–1 away defeat to Manchester City. Graham Potter was confirmed as his replacement on 9 January. On the same day, Everton sacked Sean Dyche just hours before their FA Cup match. His last match was a 1–0 away defeat to Bournemouth, with the club sitting in 16th place. On 11 January, David Moyes was confirmed as his replacement, returning to the club 12 years after leaving in 2013 to replace the retiring Sir Alex Ferguson at Manchester United.

Southampton became the first team relegated to the EFL Championship on 6 April, after just one year in the top flight, following a 3–1 defeat away to Tottenham Hotspur. With only 10 points from 31 games, they became the first team in Premier League history to go down with seven matches left to play, breaking the record shared by Derby County in 2007–08, Huddersfield Town in 2018–19 and Sheffield United in 2020–21, who were all relegated with six matches remaining. The next day, the club announced that Ivan Jurić had left his role as manager after just 108 days in charge, having won only two games during his spell (one in the Premier League and one in the FA Cup). Simon Rusk took over as interim until the end of the season with Southampton midfielder Adam Lallana becoming Rusk's assistant.

Leicester City became the second team to be relegated on 20 April after a 1–0 defeat at home to Liverpool, which extended their record for most consecutive goalless home matches, making them the first club in top-flight history to fail to score in nine consecutive home matches. Six days later, Ipswich Town joined them to become the third and final team relegated, after a 3–0 loss to Newcastle United, meaning that for the second season in a row, all three promoted teams went straight back down. It was only the third time in English top flight history in which this has happened, the first being in 1997–98. This also marked the first time in the Premier League era that all three relegated teams had been confirmed with more than four games to play, breaking the record of more than two games remaining, set in the 2020–21 season.

On 27 April, Liverpool beat Tottenham Hotspur 5–1 at Anfield to secure their second Premier League title with four games remaining, tying the record for total English league titles of 20 with rivals Manchester United.

On 18 May, and after 133 years, Goodison Park hosted its final Everton game, with the club moving to their new home (the Hill Dickinson Stadium), from the 2025–26 season. Everton eased to a 2–0 win over Southampton with Iliman Ndiaye scoring both goals, sealing his place in history as the last goalscorer at the stadium. From the 2025–26 season, Goodison Park became the permanent home for Everton Women's team and the largest dedicated women's football stadium in England.

On 25 May, Liverpool were presented with the Premier League trophy after a 1–1 draw with Crystal Palace on the final day of the season.

=== Developments ===
The two-week winter break, in effect since the 2019–20 season, was scrapped starting this season in favour of a longer summer break for the players. There were no matches held on Christmas Eve.

This season was the first to use semi-automated offside technology, as Premier League clubs unanimously agreed to its introduction. The technology was planned to be introduced after one of the autumn international breaks, but was delayed to further test the technology. It was tested in the FA Cup fifth round onwards, after which the Premier League confirmed that the technology would be used in Matchweek 32, on 12 April 2025. The Etihad Stadium was the first to officially use the technology, during Manchester City's match against Crystal Palace.

== Teams ==
Twenty teams competed in the league – the top seventeen teams from the previous season and the three teams promoted from the Championship. The promoted teams were Leicester City, Ipswich Town and Southampton. Leicester City and Southampton returned after a one-year absence, while Ipswich Town returned after a twenty-two-year absence. They replaced Luton Town, Burnley and Sheffield United, who were all relegated to the Championship after just one season in the top flight, the first time since the 1997–98 season that all three promoted teams were relegated after just one season.

=== Stadiums and locations ===
Locations of the 2024–25 Premier League teams
Greater London Premier League football clubs

Note: Table lists in alphabetical order.

Team	Location	Stadium	Capacity
Arsenal	London (Holloway)	Emirates Stadium	60,704
Aston Villa	Birmingham	Villa Park	42,918
Bournemouth	Bournemouth	Dean Court	11,307
Brentford	London (Brentford)	Brentford Community Stadium	17,250
Brighton & Hove Albion	Falmer	Falmer Stadium	31,876
Chelsea	London (Fulham)	Stamford Bridge	40,173
Crystal Palace	London (Selhurst)	Selhurst Park	25,194
Everton	Liverpool (Walton)	Goodison Park	39,414
Fulham	London (Fulham)	Craven Cottage	24,500
Ipswich Town	Ipswich	Portman Road	30,056
Leicester City	Leicester	King Power Stadium	32,259
Liverpool	Liverpool (Anfield)	Anfield	61,276
Manchester City	Manchester (Bradford)	City of Manchester Stadium	52,900
Manchester United	Manchester (Old Trafford)	Old Trafford	74,197
Newcastle United	Newcastle upon Tyne	St James' Park	52,258
Nottingham Forest	West Bridgford	City Ground	31,042
Southampton	Southampton	St Mary's Stadium	32,384
Tottenham Hotspur	London (Tottenham)	Tottenham Hotspur Stadium	62,850
West Ham United	London (Stratford)	London Stadium	62,500
Wolverhampton Wanderers	Wolverhampton	Molineux Stadium	31,750

For the 2024–25 season, the combined stadium capacity of the 20 Premier League clubs was 816,170, with an average of 40,809. At the end of the campaign, the league recorded the highest average match attendance of any association football league in the world, at 40,421 per game.

=== Personnel and kits ===
Team	Manager	Captain	Kit manufacturer	Shirt sponsor (chest)	Shirt sponsor (sleeve)
Arsenal	(Spain) Mikel Arteta	(Norway) Martin Ødegaard	Adidas	Emirates	Visit Rwanda
Aston Villa	(Spain) Unai Emery	(Scotland) John McGinn	Adidas	Betano	Trade Nation
Bournemouth	(Spain) Andoni Iraola	(England) Adam Smith	Umbro	bj88	LEOS International
Brentford	(Denmark) Thomas Frank	(Denmark) Christian Nørgaard	Umbro	Hollywoodbets	PensionBee
Brighton & Hove Albion	(Germany) Fabian Hürzeler	(England) Lewis Dunk	Nike	American Express	Experience Kissimmee
Chelsea	(Italy) Enzo Maresca	(England) Reece James	Nike	DAMAC Properties (Note: Chelsea played without a shirt sponsor until 30 April 2025, when the club announced DAMAC Properties as their shirt sponsor for the remainder of the season.)	Live Nation (Note: Chelsea's sleeve sponsor was Fever until 8 February 2025 when the deal was ended prematurely.)
Crystal Palace	(Austria) Oliver Glasner	(England) Marc Guéhi	Macron	NET88	Kaiyun Sports
Everton	(Scotland) David Moyes	(Republic of Ireland) Séamus Coleman	Castore	Stake.com	Christopher Ward
Fulham	(Portugal) Marco Silva	(Scotland) Tom Cairney	Adidas	SBOTOP	WebBeds
Ipswich Town	(Northern Ireland) Kieran McKenna	(Egypt) Sam Morsy	Umbro	+–=÷× Tour	HaloITSM
Leicester City	(Netherlands) Ruud van Nistelrooy	(England) Jamie Vardy	Adidas	BC.GAME	Bia Saigon
Liverpool	(Netherlands) Arne Slot	(Netherlands) Virgil van Dijk	Nike	Standard Chartered	Expedia
Manchester City	(Spain) Pep Guardiola	(Belgium) Kevin De Bruyne	Puma	Etihad Airways	OKX
Manchester United	(Portugal) Ruben Amorim	(Portugal) Bruno Fernandes	Adidas	Qualcomm Snapdragon	DXC Technology
Newcastle United	(England) Eddie Howe	(Brazil) Bruno Guimarães	Adidas	Sela	Noon
Nottingham Forest	(Portugal) Nuno Espírito Santo	(England) Ryan Yates	Adidas	Kaiyun Sports	Ideagen
Southampton	(Scotland) Simon Rusk (interim)	(England) Jack Stephens	Puma	Rollbit	P&O Cruises
Tottenham Hotspur	(Australia) Ange Postecoglou	(South Korea) Son Heung-min	Nike	AIA	Kraken
West Ham United	(England) Graham Potter	(England) Jarrod Bowen	Umbro	Betway	QuickBooks
Wolverhampton Wanderers	(Portugal) Vítor Pereira	(Portugal) Nélson Semedo (Note: Mario Lemina was club captain at Wolverhampton Wanderers until 13 December 2024, when he was stripped of the role following an incident in the previous match against West Ham United.)	Sudu	DEBET	JD Sports

=== Managerial changes ===
Team	Outgoing manager	Manner of departure	Date of vacancy	Position in the table	Incoming manager	Date of appointment
Brighton & Hove Albion	(Italy) Roberto De Zerbi	Mutual consent	19 May 2024	Pre-season	(Germany) Fabian Hürzeler	15 June 2024
Liverpool	(Germany) Jürgen Klopp	Resigned	19 May 2024	Pre-season	(Netherlands) Arne Slot	1 June 2024
West Ham United	(Scotland) David Moyes	End of contract	19 May 2024	Pre-season	(Spain) Julen Lopetegui	1 July 2024
Chelsea	(Argentina) Mauricio Pochettino	Mutual consent	21 May 2024	Pre-season	(Italy) Enzo Maresca	3 June 2024
Leicester City	(Italy) Enzo Maresca	Signed by Chelsea	3 June 2024	Pre-season	(Wales) Steve Cooper	20 June 2024
Manchester United	(Netherlands) Erik ten Hag	Sacked	28 October 2024	14th	(Netherlands) Ruud van Nistelrooy (interim)	28 October 2024
Manchester United	(Netherlands) Ruud van Nistelrooy	End of interim spell	11 November 2024	13th	(Portugal) Ruben Amorim	11 November 2024
Leicester City	(Wales) Steve Cooper	Sacked	24 November 2024	16th	(England) Ben Dawson (interim)	24 November 2024
Leicester City	(England) Ben Dawson	End of interim spell	1 December 2024	16th	(Netherlands) Ruud van Nistelrooy	1 December 2024
Wolverhampton Wanderers	(England) Gary O'Neil	Sacked	15 December 2024	19th	(Portugal) Vítor Pereira	19 December 2024
Southampton	(Scotland) Russell Martin	Sacked	15 December 2024	20th	(England) Simon Rusk (interim)	15 December 2024
Southampton	(England) Simon Rusk	End of interim spell	22 December 2024	20th	(Croatia) Ivan Jurić	22 December 2024
West Ham United	(Spain) Julen Lopetegui	Sacked	8 January 2025	14th	(England) Graham Potter	9 January 2025
Everton	(England) Sean Dyche	Sacked	9 January 2025	16th	(England) Leighton Baines (interim)	9 January 2025
Everton	(The Football Association) Leighton Baines	End of interim spell	11 January 2025	16th	(Scotland) David Moyes	11 January 2025
Southampton	(Croatia) Ivan Jurić	Mutual consent	7 April 2025	20th	(England) Simon Rusk (interim)	7 April 2025

== League table ==
Pos	Team	Pld	W	D	L	GF	GA	GD	Pts	Qualification or relegation
1	Liverpool (C)	38	25	9	4	86	41	+45	84	Qualification for the Champions League league phase (Note: The Premier League gained an additional Champions League place as a result of England gaining one of the two European Performance Spots (EPS) awarded to the two associations with the highest UEFA coefficient points in 2024–25.)
2	Arsenal	38	20	14	4	69	34	+35	74	Qualification for the Champions League league phase
3	Manchester City	38	21	8	9	72	44	+28	71	Qualification for the Champions League league phase
4	Chelsea	38	20	9	9	64	43	+21	69	Qualification for the Champions League league phase
5	Newcastle United	38	20	6	12	68	47	+21	66	Qualification for the Champions League league phase
6	Aston Villa	38	19	9	10	58	51	+7	66	Qualification for the Europa League league phase (Note: Initially, Crystal Palace qualified for the Europa League league phase as the 2024–25 FA Cup winners. However, due to multi-club ownership rules, they were not permitted to enter the Europa League and entered the Conference League play-off round instead, with 7th-placed Nottingham Forest taking their place in the Europa League. Crystal Palace appealed the decision but this was ultimately rejected.)
7	Nottingham Forest	38	19	8	11	58	46	+12	65	Qualification for the Europa League league phase
8	Brighton & Hove Albion	38	16	13	9	66	59	+7	61	
9	Bournemouth	38	15	11	12	58	46	+12	56	
10	Brentford	38	16	8	14	66	57	+9	56	
11	Fulham	38	15	9	14	54	54	0	54	
12	Crystal Palace	38	13	14	11	51	51	0	53	Qualification for the Conference League play-off round (Note: Since the winners of the 2024–25 EFL Cup, Newcastle United, qualified for the Champions League via league position, the spot reserved for the EFL Cup winners (Conference League play-off round) was initially passed to the 7th-placed team (Nottingham Forest). However due to multi-club ownership rules, the winners of the FA Cup, Crystal Palace, were not permitted to enter the Europa League and entered the Conference League play-off round instead, with Nottingham Forest taking their place in the Europa League. Crystal Palace appealed the decision but this was ultimately rejected.)
13	Everton	38	11	15	12	42	44	−2	48	
14	West Ham United	38	11	10	17	46	62	−16	43	
15	Manchester United	38	11	9	18	44	54	−10	42	
16	Wolverhampton Wanderers	38	12	6	20	54	69	−15	42	
17	Tottenham Hotspur	38	11	5	22	64	65	−1	38	Qualification for the Champions League league phase (Note: Tottenham Hotspur qualified for the Champions League league phase as the 2024–25 UEFA Europa League winners.)
18	Leicester City (R)	38	6	7	25	33	80	−47	25	Relegation to EFL Championship
19	Ipswich Town (R)	38	4	10	24	36	82	−46	22	Relegation to EFL Championship
20	Southampton (R)	38	2	6	30	26	86	−60	12	Relegation to EFL Championship

Source: Premier League
Rules for classification: 1) Points; 2) Goal difference; 3) Goals scored; 4) If the champions, relegated teams or qualified teams for UEFA competitions cannot be determined by rules 1 to 3, rules 4.1 to 4.3 are applied – 4.1) Points gained in head-to-head record between such teams; 4.2) Away goals scored in head-to-head record between such teams; 4.3) Play-offs
(C) Champions; (R) Relegated

== Results ==
Home \ Away	ARS	AVL	BOU	BRE	BHA	CHE	CRY	EVE	FUL	IPS	LEI	LIV	MCI	MUN	NEW	NFO	SOU	TOT	WHU	WOL
Arsenal	—	2–2	1–2	1–1	1–1	1–0	2–2	0–0	2–1	1–0	4–2	2–2	5–1	2–0	1–0	3–0	3–1	2–1	0–1	2–0
Aston Villa	0–2	—	1–1	3–1	2–2	2–1	2–2	3–2	1–0	1–1	2–1	2–2	2–1	0–0	4–1	2–1	1–0	2–0	1–1	3–1
Bournemouth	2–0	0–1	—	1–2	1–2	0–1	0–0	1–0	1–0	1–2	2–0	0–2	2–1	1–1	1–1	5–0	3–1	1–0	1–1	0–1
Brentford	1–3	0–1	3–2	—	4–2	0–0	2–1	1–1	2–3	4–3	4–1	0–2	2–2	4–3	4–2	0–2	3–1	0–2	1–1	5–3
Brighton & Hove Albion	1–1	0–3	2–1	0–0	—	3–0	1–3	0–1	2–1	0–0	2–2	3–2	2–1	2–1	1–1	2–2	1–1	3–2	3–2	2–2
Chelsea	1–1	3–0	2–2	2–1	4–2	—	1–1	1–0	1–2	2–2	1–0	3–1	0–2	1–0	2–1	1–1	4–0	1–0	2–1	3–1
Crystal Palace	1–5	4–1	0–0	1–2	2–1	1–1	—	1–2	0–2	1–0	2–2	0–1	2–2	0–0	1–1	1–1	2–1	1–0	0–2	4–2
Everton	1–1	0–1	2–3	0–0	0–3	0–0	2–1	—	1–1	2–2	4–0	2–2	0–2	2–2	0–0	0–2	2–0	3–2	1–1	4–0
Fulham	1–1	1–3	2–2	2–1	3–1	1–2	0–2	1–3	—	2–2	2–1	3–2	0–2	0–1	3–1	2–1	0–0	2–0	1–1	1–4
Ipswich Town	0–4	2–2	1–2	0–1	0–2	2–0	0–1	0–2	1–1	—	1–1	0–2	0–6	1–1	0–4	2–4	1–2	1–4	1–3	1–2
Leicester City	0–2	1–2	1–0	0–4	2–2	1–2	0–2	1–1	0–2	2–0	—	0–1	0–2	0–3	0–3	1–3	2–0	1–1	3–1	0–3
Liverpool	2–2	2–0	3–0	2–0	2–1	2–1	1–1	1–0	2–2	4–1	3–1	—	2–0	2–2	2–0	0–1	3–1	5–1	2–1	2–1
Manchester City	2–2	2–1	3–1	2–1	2–2	3–1	5–2	1–1	3–2	4–1	2–0	0–2	—	1–2	4–0	3–0	1–0	0–4	4–1	1–0
Manchester United	1–1	2–0	0–3	2–1	1–3	1–1	0–2	4–0	1–0	3–2	3–0	0–3	0–0	—	0–2	2–3	3–1	0–3	0–2	0–1
Newcastle United	1–0	3–0	1–4	2–1	0–1	2–0	5–0	0–1	1–2	3–0	4–0	3–3	1–1	4–1	—	4–3	1–0	2–1	0–2	3–0
Nottingham Forest	0–0	2–1	1–1	0–2	7–0	0–1	1–0	0–1	0–1	1–0	2–2	1–1	1–0	1–0	1–3	—	3–2	1–0	3–0	1–1
Southampton	1–2	0–3	1–3	0–5	0–4	1–5	1–1	1–0	1–2	1–1	2–3	2–3	0–0	0–3	1–3	0–1	—	0–5	0–1	1–2
Tottenham Hotspur	0–1	4–1	2–2	3–1	1–4	3–4	0–2	4–0	1–1	1–2	1–2	3–6	0–1	1–0	1–2	1–2	3–1	—	4–1	2–2
West Ham United	2–5	1–2	2–2	0–1	1–1	0–3	0–2	0–0	3–2	4–1	2–0	0–5	1–3	2–1	0–1	1–2	1–1	1–1	—	2–1
Wolverhampton Wanderers	0–1	2–0	2–4	1–1	0–2	2–6	2–2	1–1	1–2	1–2	3–0	1–2	1–2	2–0	1–2	0–3	2–0	4–2	1–0	—

Source: Premier League
Legend: Blue = home team win; Yellow = draw; Red = away team win.
For upcoming matches, an "a" indicates there is an article about the rivalry between the two participants.

== Season statistics ==
=== Top scorers ===
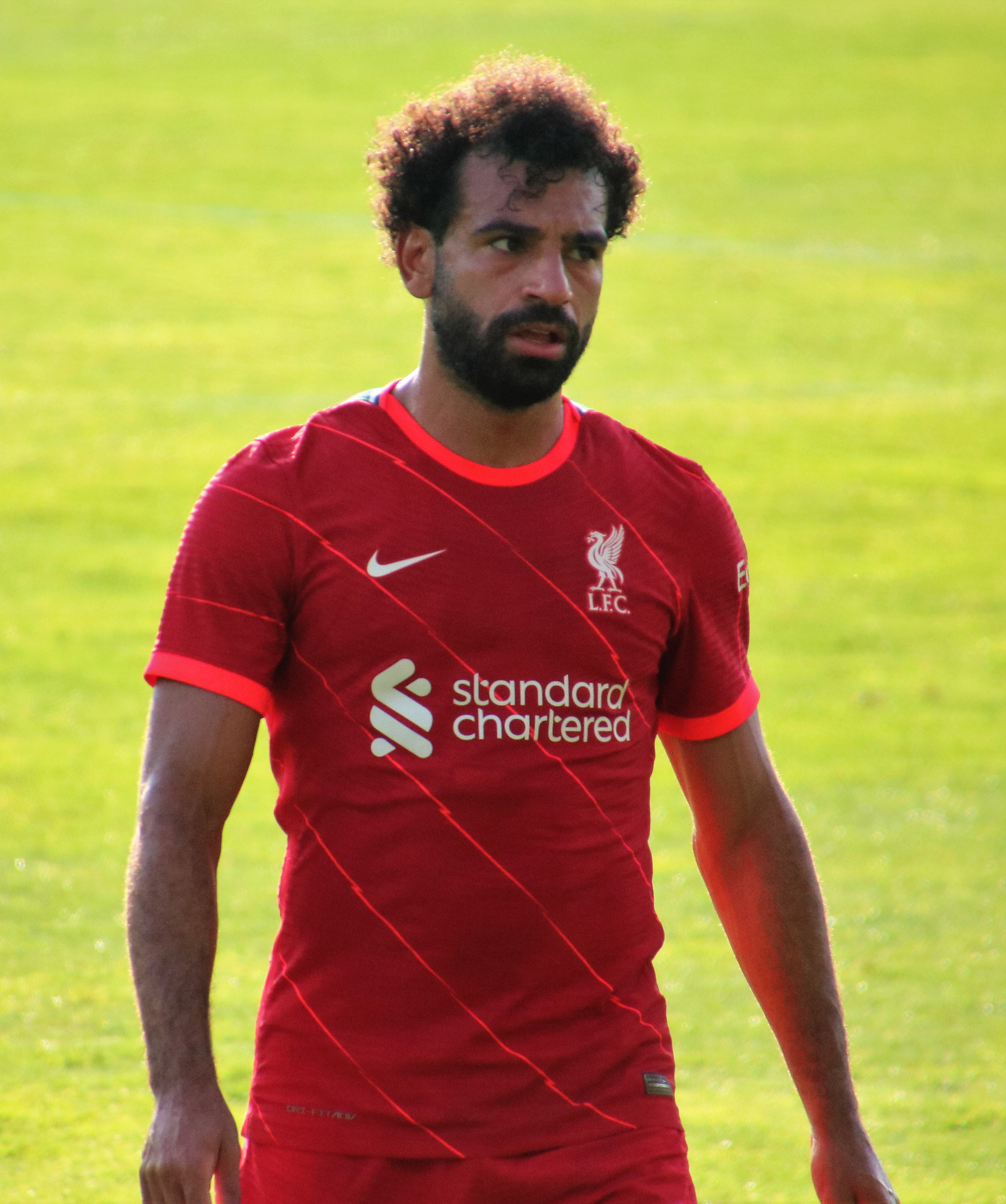
Mohamed Salah won his fourth Premier League Golden Boot after scoring 29 goals for Liverpool. He also won the Premier League Playmaker of the Season award, having assisted 18 goals.

Rank	Player	Club	Goals
1	(Egypt) Mohamed Salah	Liverpool	29
2	(Sweden) Alexander Isak	Newcastle United	23
3	(Norway) Erling Haaland	Manchester City	22
4	(Cameroon) Bryan Mbeumo	Brentford	20
4	(New Zealand) Chris Wood	Nottingham Forest	20
6	(Democratic Republic of the Congo) Yoane Wissa	Brentford	19
7	(England) Ollie Watkins	Aston Villa	16
8	(Brazil) Matheus Cunha	Wolverhampton Wanderers	15
8	(England) Cole Palmer	Chelsea	15
10	(Norway) Jørgen Strand Larsen	Wolverhampton Wanderers	14
10	(France) Jean-Philippe Mateta	Crystal Palace	14

=== Hat-tricks ===
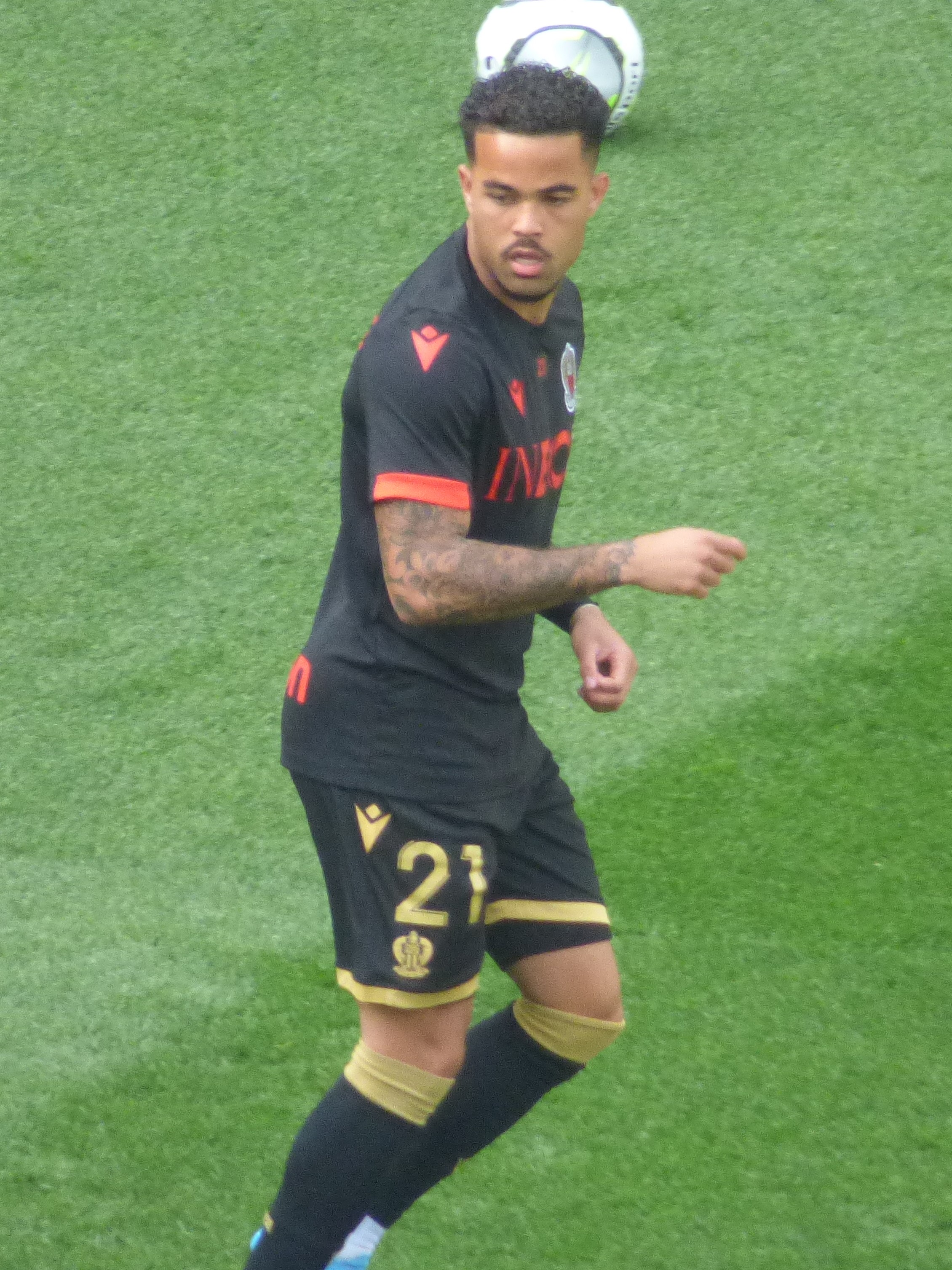
Bournemouth's Justin Kluivert became the first player to score a hat-trick of penalties in a Premier League match.

Player	For	Against	Result	Date
(Norway) Erling Haaland	Manchester City	Ipswich Town	4–1 (H)	24 August 2024
(England) Noni Madueke	Chelsea	Wolverhampton Wanderers	6–2 (A)	25 August 2024
(Norway) Erling Haaland	Manchester City	West Ham United	3–1 (A)	31 August 2024
(England) Cole Palmer^{4}	Chelsea	Brighton & Hove Albion	4–2 (H)	28 September 2024
(Germany) Kevin Schade	Brentford	Leicester City	4–1 (H)	30 November 2024
(Netherlands) Justin Kluivert	Bournemouth	Wolverhampton Wanderers	4–2 (A)	30 November 2024
(Sweden) Alexander Isak	Newcastle United	Ipswich Town	4–0 (A)	21 December 2024
(Ivory Coast) Amad Diallo	Manchester United	Southampton	3–1 (H)	16 January 2025
(Netherlands) Justin Kluivert	Bournemouth	Newcastle United	4–1 (A)	18 January 2025
(Burkina Faso) Dango Ouattara	Bournemouth	Nottingham Forest	5–0 (H)	25 January 2025
(New Zealand) Chris Wood	Nottingham Forest	Brighton & Hove Albion	7–0 (H)	1 February 2025
(Egypt) Omar Marmoush	Manchester City	Newcastle United	4–0 (H)	15 February 2025

Note: ^{4} – player scored 4 goals

=== Clean sheets ===
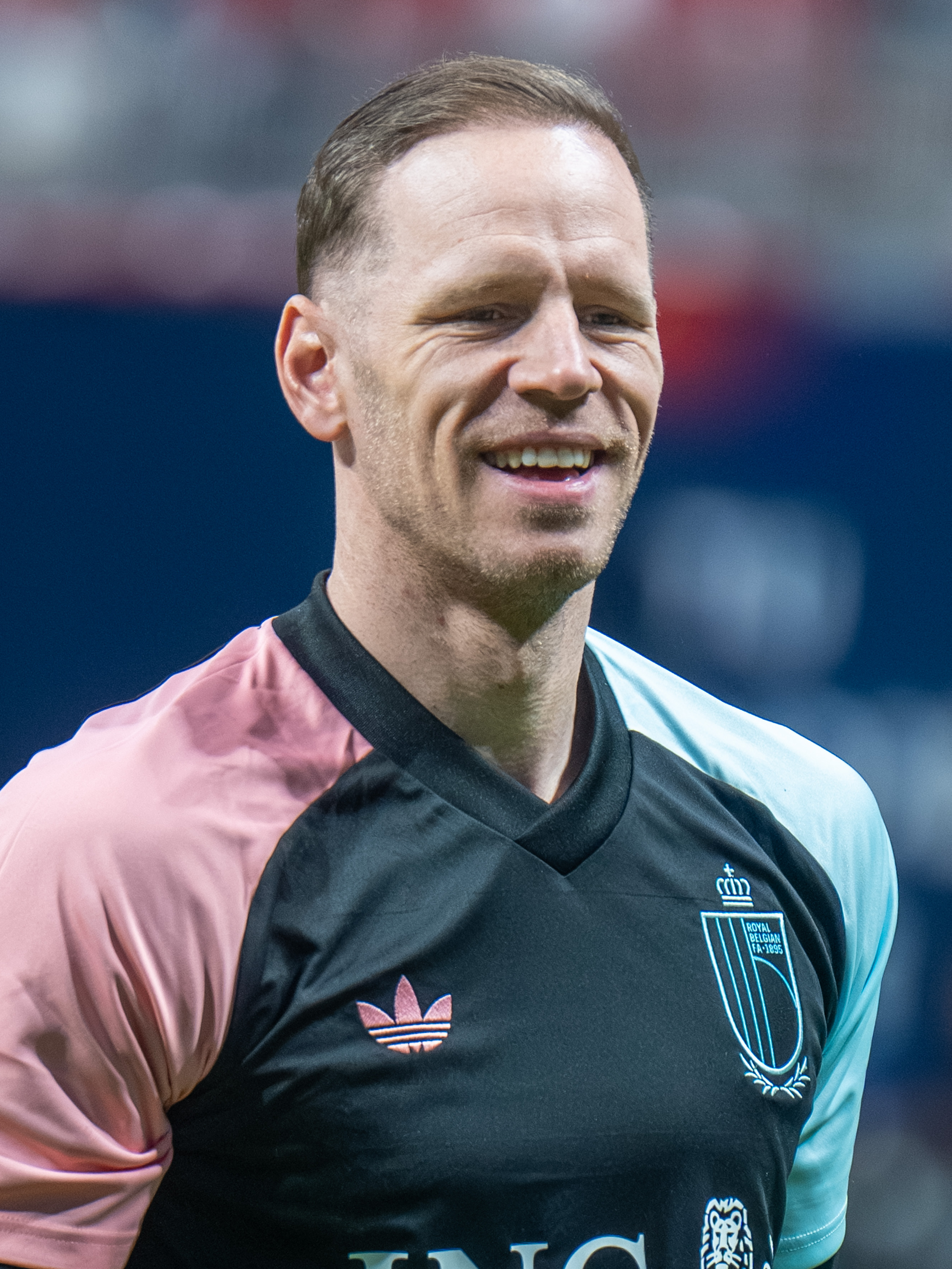
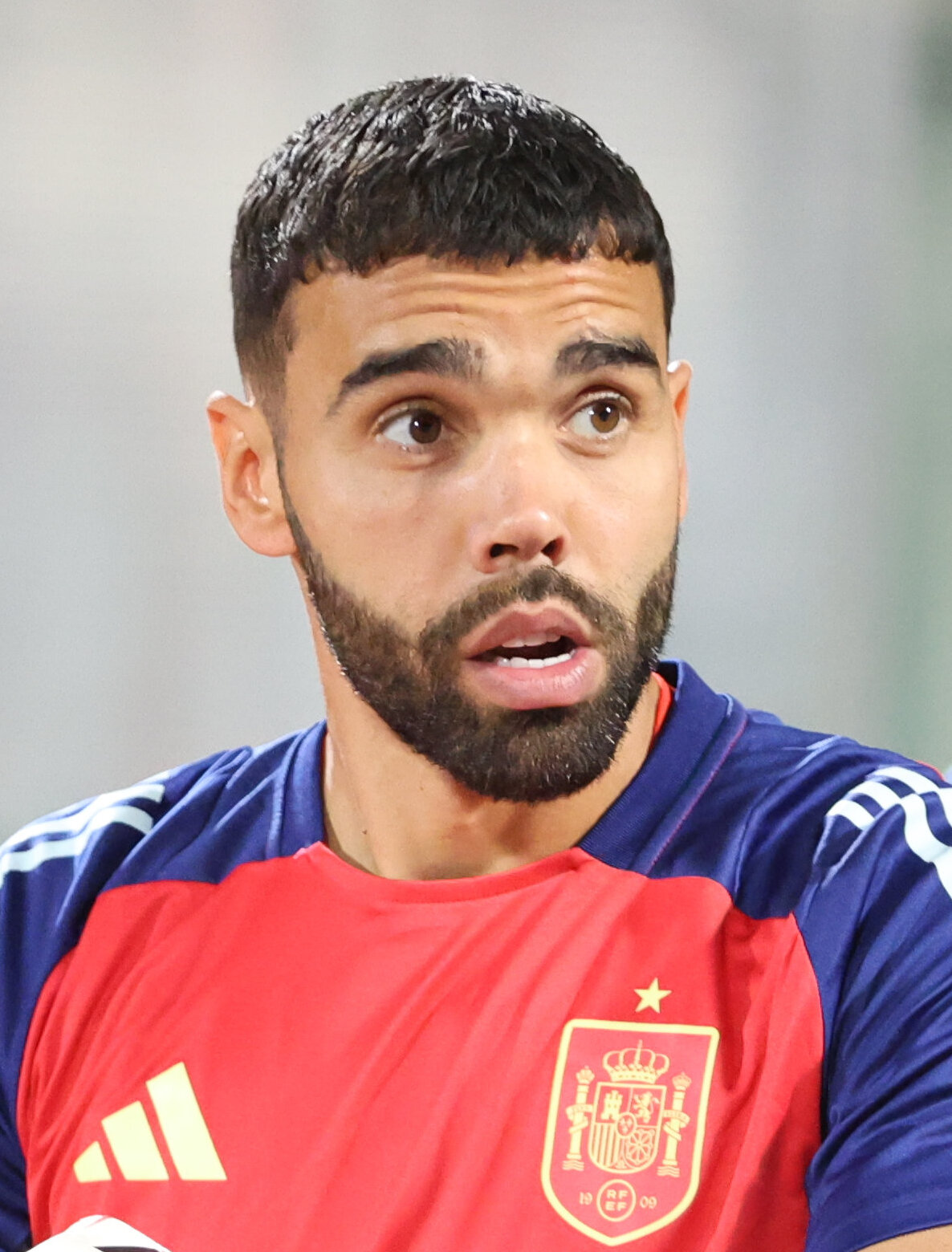
Matz Sels and David Raya both won the Premier League Golden Glove as they each kept 13 clean sheets for Nottingham Forest and Arsenal respectively.

Rank	Player	Club	Clean sheets
1	(Spain) David Raya	Arsenal	13
1	(Belgium) Matz Sels	Nottingham Forest	13
3	(England) Jordan Pickford	Everton	12
4	(England) Dean Henderson	Crystal Palace	11
5	(Brazil) Ederson	Manchester City	10
5	(Spain) Robert Sánchez	Chelsea	10
7	(Brazil) Alisson	Liverpool	9
7	(Cameroon) André Onana	Manchester United	9
9	(Spain) Kepa Arrizabalaga	Bournemouth	8
9	(Argentina) Emiliano Martínez	Aston Villa	8
9	(England) Nick Pope	Newcastle United	8

=== Discipline ===
==== Player ====
- Most yellow cards: 12
  - (England) Liam Delap (Ipswich Town)
  - (England) Flynn Downes (Southampton)
  - (Serbia) Saša Lukić (Fulham)
- Most red cards: 2
  - (Portugal) Bruno Fernandes (Manchester United)
  - (England) Myles Lewis-Skelly (Arsenal)
  - (England) Jack Stephens (Southampton)

==== Club ====
- Most yellow cards: 99
  - Chelsea
- Fewest yellow cards: 57
  - Manchester City
- Most red cards: 6
  - Arsenal
- Fewest red cards: 0
  - Leicester City

== Awards ==
=== Monthly awards ===
Month	Manager of the Month		Player of the Month		Goal of the Month		Save of the Month		References
Month	Manager	Club	Player	Club	Player	Club	Player	Club	References
August	(Germany) Fabian Hürzeler	Brighton & Hove Albion	(Norway) Erling Haaland	Manchester City	(England) Cole Palmer	Chelsea	(Spain) David Raya	Arsenal	
September	(Italy) Enzo Maresca	Chelsea	(England) Cole Palmer	Chelsea	(Colombia) Jhon Durán	Aston Villa	(Cameroon) André Onana	Manchester United	
October	(Portugal) Nuno Espírito Santo	Nottingham Forest	(New Zealand) Chris Wood	Nottingham Forest	(Senegal) Nicolas Jackson	Chelsea	(Spain) Robert Sánchez	Chelsea	
November	(Netherlands) Arne Slot	Liverpool	(Egypt) Mohamed Salah	Liverpool	(Wales) Harry Wilson	Fulham	(Cameroon) André Onana	Manchester United	
December	(Portugal) Nuno Espírito Santo	Nottingham Forest	(Sweden) Alexander Isak	Newcastle United	(Sweden) Alexander Isak	Newcastle United	(Argentina) Emiliano Martínez	Aston Villa	
January	(Spain) Andoni Iraola	Bournemouth	(Netherlands) Justin Kluivert	Bournemouth	(Wales) David Brooks	Bournemouth	(Slovakia) Martin Dúbravka	Newcastle United	
February	(Scotland) David Moyes	Everton	(Egypt) Mohamed Salah	Liverpool	(Japan) Kaoru Mitoma	Brighton & Hove Albion	(Spain) Kepa Arrizabalaga	Bournemouth	
March	(Portugal) Nuno Espírito Santo	Nottingham Forest	(Portugal) Bruno Fernandes	Manchester United	(Sweden) Jens Cajuste	Ipswich Town	(Spain) David Raya	Arsenal	
April	(Portugal) Vítor Pereira	Wolverhampton Wanderers	(Argentina) Alexis Mac Allister	Liverpool	(Cameroon) Carlos Baleba	Brighton & Hove Albion	(Italy) Guglielmo Vicario	Tottenham Hotspur	

=== Annual awards ===
Award	Winner	Club
Premier League Manager of the Season	(Netherlands) Arne Slot	Liverpool
Premier League Player of the Season	(Egypt) Mohamed Salah	Liverpool
Premier League Young Player of the Season	(Netherlands) Ryan Gravenberch	Liverpool
Premier League Goal of the Season	(Egypt) Omar Marmoush	Manchester City
Premier League Most Powerful Goal	(Sweden) Alexander Isak	Newcastle United
Premier League Save of the Season	(Argentina) Emiliano Martínez	Aston Villa
PFA Players' Player of the Year	(Egypt) Mohamed Salah	Liverpool
PFA Young Player of the Year	(England) Morgan Rogers	Aston Villa
FWA Footballer of the Year	(Egypt) Mohamed Salah	Liverpool

PFA Team of the Year
Goalkeeper	(Belgium) Matz Sels (Nottingham Forest)			
Defenders	(France) William Saliba (Arsenal)	(Brazil) Gabriel (Arsenal)	(Netherlands) Virgil van Dijk (Liverpool)	(Hungary) Milos Kerkez (Bournemouth)
Midfielders	(Argentina) Alexis Mac Allister (Liverpool)		(Netherlands) Ryan Gravenberch (Liverpool)	(England) Declan Rice (Arsenal)
Forwards	(Egypt) Mohamed Salah (Liverpool)		(Sweden) Alexander Isak (Newcastle United)	(New Zealand) Chris Wood (Nottingham Forest)

Premier League Fan Team of the Season
Goalkeeper	(Belgium) Matz Sels (Nottingham Forest)			
Defenders	(Colombia) Daniel Muñoz (Crystal Palace)	(France) William Saliba (Arsenal)	(Netherlands) Virgil van Dijk (Liverpool)	(Hungary) Milos Kerkez (Bournemouth)
Midfielders	(Egypt) Mohamed Salah (Liverpool)	(Netherlands) Ryan Gravenberch (Liverpool)	(England) Declan Rice (Arsenal)	(Cameroon) Bryan Mbeumo (Brentford)
Forwards	(Sweden) Alexander Isak (Newcastle United)		(New Zealand) Chris Wood (Nottingham Forest)	

== Attendances ==
Manchester United drew the highest average home attendance in the 2024–25 edition of the Premier League.

#	Football club	Home games	Average attendance
1	Manchester United	19	73,747
2	West Ham United	19	62,464
3	Tottenham Hotspur	19	61,127
4	Liverpool FC	19	60,330
5	Arsenal FC	19	60,251
6	Manchester City	19	52,591
7	Newcastle United	19	52,187
8	Aston Villa	19	42,079
9	Chelsea FC	19	39,611
10	Everton FC	19	39,173
11	Brighton & Hove Albion	19	31,482
12	Leicester City	19	31,448
13	Southampton FC	19	30,865
14	Wolverhampton Wanderers	19	30,660
15	Nottingham Forest	19	30,059
16	Ipswich Town	19	29,742
17	Fulham FC	19	26,826
18	Crystal Palace	19	25,064
19	Brentford FC	19	17,094
20	AFC Bournemouth	19	11,214

== See also ==
- 2024–25 EFL Championship
- 2024–25 EFL League One
- 2024–25 EFL League Two
- 2024–25 National League
- 2024–25 EFL Cup
- 2024–25 FA Cup
- 2024–25 EFL Trophy
