= Lee Scroggins =

English footballer (born 1981)

Personal information
- Date of birth: 23 October 1981 (age 45)
- Place of birth: Darlington, England
- Position: Midfielder

Team information
- Current team: South Shields

College career
Years	Team	Apps	(Gls)
2003–2006	Lynn Fighting Knights	55	(34)

Senior career*
Years	Team	Apps	(Gls)
–2001	Darlington	0	(0)
2001–2002	Blyth Spartans	33	(4)
2002–2003	Whitley Bay		
2006	Virginia Beach Mariners	16	(1)
2007–2011	South Shields	143	(52)
2011–2013	Whitley Bay		
2013–2015	Shildon		
2015–2017	South Shields	67	(10)
- * Club domestic league appearances and goals

Lee Scroggins (born 23 October 1981) is an English footballer who played as a midfielder for South Shields.

Scroggins began his career with Darlington, but moved on to the Northern Premier League Premier Division club Blyth Spartans in 2001 without having played for Darlington's first team. He spent just over a year with the Spartans, before joining Whitley Bay of the Northern League for the remainder of the 2002–03 season. Scroggins then moved to the United States, where he had a successful college soccer career at Lynn University, graduating in Sports Recreation and Management. He played for Virginia Beach Mariners in the USL First Division in the 2006 season, but the club folded, and Scroggins returned to England, where he joined the Northern League side South Shields in 2007.
