= South Shields F.C. =

Association football club in England

Coordinates: 54°58′28.2864″N 1°28′12.3306″W

South Shields
- Full name: South Shields Football Club
- Nickname: The Mariners
- Founded: 1888 (as South Shields Adelaide Athletic); 1974 (reformed as South Shields F.C.)
- Ground: Mariners Park
- Capacity: 4,000
- Chairman: Geoff Thompson
- Manager: Mike Williamson
- League: National League North
- 2025–26: National League North, 2nd of 24
Home colours	Away colours

South Shields Football Club is a professional association football club based in South Shields, Tyne and Wear, England. The team competes in the National League North, the sixth level of the English football league system.

The third club of this name, it was formed in 1888 and refounded in 1974. They won the Wearside League in 1977 and remained at this level for 15 years before moving next to the Filtrona factory for 1992. The club also won the Wearside League in 1993 and 1995. The club earned promotion to the Northern Football League first division, remaining there for four years until relegation in 2000. In 2015, the club was purchased by Geoff Thompson who would oversee several promotions and increased attendances. After several high-profile signings, the Mariners earned several promotions to the Northern Premier League and also won the 2017 FA Vase final. They gained promotion to the National League North as champions in the 2022–23 season.

South Shields play their home matches at Mariners Park in Simonside, over the boundary from South Shields in Jarrow. The team is often nicknamed the Mariners.

== History ==
=== Formation and early years ===
The club was formed in the same year as the previous club failed, after a second move to Gateshead by the previous club, and the sale of Simonside Hall, given to the club by supporters. The re-formed club under chairman Martin Ford (a director at the club who disagreed with the sale of Simonside Hall and subsequent move to Gateshead International Stadium) was based at the council's Jack Clark Park which was primarily a cricket pitch, and began a 17-year crusade for a home of its own.

After two title winning seasons in the Northern Alliance, and an appearance in the quarter-finals of the FA Vase in 1976, Shields joined the Wearside League winning the league at the first attempt in 1977 and completing a league and cup double by winning the Durham Challenge Cup against Consett at Roker Park, the first county cup win for the club since it was reformed. The team however was broken up as the club did not have the facilities needed to meet the requirements of joining the Northern League. So the club spent the next 15 years languishing in mid table in the Wearside League while the club searched for a suitable home.

Ultimately, chairman John Rundle and his family provided the long wished-for new ground by purchasing the run down and vandalized facilities next door to the Filtrona factory, the ground was refurbished and ready for use in 1992, the team thanks to the management of Bobby Elwell and the goals of the strike partnership of Steve Harkus and club's record goalscorer Paul Thompson, responded by winning a double of the Wearside League for the first time since 1977 and the Sunderland Shipowners Cup.

=== Northern League ===
In 1994–95 the club won the Wearside League for the second time in three years with a big highlight being a run to the final of the Durham Challenge Cup, in which Filtrona Park hosted the replay which Shields lost 3–0 to Spennymoor United (in front of a then record attendance of 1,500), and were promoted to Northern League Division Two. Shields were quickly promoted again to Northern League Division One the following season after finishing runners up, The club enjoyed a 4-year stay in the 1st division with a big highlight in that time being a run to the 3rd Qualifying Round of the FA Cup in 1997 which ended in a close 3–2 defeat at Gainsborough Trinity. The club however could not build upon this and ultimately were relegated down to Division 2 in the 1999–2000 season with just 16 points. Chairman John Rundle publicly threatened to fold the club if they went down, though he did not follow the threat through.

After several seasons stuck in mid table in Division Two, John Rundle again threatened the club with closure in 2006, locking the gates at Filtrona Park before a home game. However, a new committee was formed, headed by new chairman Gary Crutwell, and the club was saved, the team was quickly rebuilt under the management of Micky Taylor and come the end of the season, a 2–1 win at home to Penrith on the final day prevented what could have been a near fatal relegation back to the Wearside League. The club's performance improved the following season, although the team missed out on promotion by just 5 points. An FA Vase run to the 3rd round that season was a big highlight, coming to end in a 7-goal thriller at home to eventual semi-finalists Curzon Ashton. The club however built on the success of the previous season and won promotion back to Division 1 finishing runners-up to Penrith. Shields then settled down as a solid mid-table Division one side with a big highlight being winning the Northern League Cup in 2010 after beating Ashington 6–5 on penalties after a 2–2 draw at Dunston, the club's first honour since joining the Northern League.

In the 2012–13 season, despite uncertainty regarding the ground, there were early positive signs shown in a good FA Cup run which included a win over Darlington RA and knocking out NPL opposition in the form of Harrogate Railway Athletic before falling to Spennymoor Town in the 1st Qualifying Round. From then on, the season went downhill, despite some positive performances, these were few and far between and despite a late season charge of 5 successive wins, Shields were ultimately relegated from Northern League Division One. Things took a turn for the worse when the club were forced to move to Eden Lane in Peterlee, after its lease on Filtrona Park expired.

The club spent the 2013–14 and 2014–15 seasons in Division Two of the Northern League. Despite having to play home games 20 miles away in Peterlee in front of double digit crowds and difficulties when it came to raising teams to play, manager Jon King managed to maintain the club's Northern League status with 17th and 15th-place finishes.

=== New ownership ===
In the summer of 2015 however, a local businessman by the name of Geoff Thompson (founder of Utilitywise) became chairman and bought the original Filtrona Park from John Rundle. He renamed the ground as 'Mariners Park'. To celebrate the return, a crowd of over 650 showed up to see Shields play a friendly against Darlington. The new season itself started off brightly with genuine hopes for promotion back to Division 1 before the club pulled off a massive coup, tempting the former Sunderland and Middlesbrough midfielder Julio Arca out of retirement to sign for South Shields.

Arca was joined by David Foley, Wayne Phillips, Lee Scroggins and Robert Briggs. Shields went on to achieve promotion with of 107 points, the second highest points total in the history of the 2nd Division. Promotion itself was achieved in a 1–0 win at Easington Colliery with the league title to follow 2 weeks later in a 4–0 win at Crook Town. As the club were beginning to generate a positive buzz around the town, attendances began to improve, eventually peaking with a then new record attendance of 1,827 for the local derby against Hebburn Town.

==== Lee Picton and Graham Fenton ====
The rebuild continued throughout the summer of 2016 with Jon Shaw, Gavin Cogdon, Carl Finnigan and Craig Baxter brought in as Shields attempted to push for the Division 1 championship. However, part-way into the season, manager Jon King was dismissed and was replaced by Lee Picton and North Shields manager Graham Fenton. In October 2016, South Shields then appointed former Sunderland defender Martin Scott as assistant manager.

South Shields went on to lose just one game in all competitions out of 55, this included a period between November 2016 and April 2017 of 32 successive wins, an unofficial world record. They would go on to win the Durham Challenge Cup for the first time since 1977, the Northern League Cup for the second time and the FA Vase. Shields had dispatched Esh Winning, Runcorn Linnets, Marske United, Staveley Miners Welfare, Morpeth Town and Team Solent before a home quarter-final against Newport Pagnell Town, here the attendance record was smashed as a crowd of 3,161 saw Shields dispatch their Buckinghamshire opponents 6–1 setting up a semi-final tie against Warwickshire club Coleshill Town.

Despite a spirited display from their opponents, Shields managed to grind out what turned out to be a crucial 2–1 win in the away leg at Coleshill Town and a week later, Shields turned on the style in a 4–0 win in front of a new ground record of 3,464 meaning South Shields would be going to Wembley Stadium for the first time in their history. In the final on 21 May 2017, South Shields's opposition came in the form of the Northern Counties East League champions Cleethorpes Town against whom Shields played in front of an estimated 14,000 of their own supporters. Shields went on to win 4–0 to lift the 2017 FA Vase.

In this time, South Shields also managed to use their multiple games in hand to overturn a 17-point deficit to rivals North Shields at the top of the Northern League to win the title with 108 points, with the league title clinched after a 4–1 win away at Ashington. This meant that when the FA Vase was won, South Shields had completed a 'quadruple' of trophies.

The 2017–18 season brought more success in the form of a club record run in the FA Cup. After beating Bridlington Town and Witton Albion, South Shields inflicted two big cup shocks against higher division Darlington and York City. This set up a 4th qualifying round fixture against local Hartlepool United (a team three divisions higher). The visitors narrowly won 2–1 in front of a crowd of 2,887. South Shields entered the FA Trophy for the first time since 1974 and reached the 2nd Qualifying round of the tournament.

In the league, Shields recovered from a New Year's Day defeat at home to title rivals Scarborough Athletic to win promotion and the league title by losing just one of their remaining 23 league games. A 4–2 defeat at Colwyn Bay in September ended an unbeaten run in all competitions that stretched back 11 months and the 100 point mark was surpassed for the third successive season. Julio Arca went on to lift the league championship trophy in front of a jubilant home crowd of over 2,000 on the final day. However, this turned out to be his last act as a South Shields player as he would announce his retirement soon after.

==== Northern Premier League ====
In the 2018–19 season, South Shields competed in the NPL Premier Division, the same division which the previous incarnation of the club left behind in 1974 and also the highest level of non-League football that the current incarnation of the club had ever played at.

The first team would have a very positive first season at NPL Premier Division level. Despite a sluggish start, Shields would go on to lose just 2 of their remaining 28 league games to take the title fight all the way to the final day, ultimately losing out to Farsley Celtic by just three points. Despite this, Shields claimed a highly respectable 2nd-place finish. However the playoffs would end at the second hurdle where Shields would fall to Warrington Town in the league play-off final. This ended the streak of promotions at three.

The 2019–20 season saw many changes at the club, the biggest being the switch to a hybrid model encompassing both part-time and full-time players, the first steps towards Shields becoming a full-time professional club which saw a significant turnover of players.

The league season started very strongly with the club winning 10 of their first 12 games before a mid-season blip saw their 10-point lead wiped out. Furthermore, the club made it to the first round of the FA Trophy before losing out to Southport. Form began to improve through the winter with 5 wins in 6 before the 2020 Coronavirus Pandemic put a premature end to the league season. At the point of stoppage, Shields held a 12-point lead at the top of the NPL Premier Division with just 9 games left to play. A legal challenge attempting to overturn the ruling to null and void the season proved unsuccessful; thereby confirming Shields would once again participate in the Northern Premier League for the 2020–21 season.

In that 2020–21 season, the season was curtailed once again thanks to the pandemic but history was still made. For the first time in the history of the current incarnation, the Mariners made the first round of the FA Cup following a win against National League side FC Halifax Town. This set up a first round fixture with League Two side Cheltenham Town which South Shields lost 3–1.

The 2021–22 season saw South Shields become fully professional, the first time a football club in the town would have that status since the first incarnation's Football League days in the 1920s. But despite a strong start (winning 9 of the first 11 league games) and a mid season managerial change (which saw Graham Fenton replaced by Kevin Phillips), Shields were ultimately pipped to the league title by Buxton and would go on to lose in the play-off semi-finals to Warrington Town.

In the 2022–23 FA Cup, Shields beat National League side Scunthorpe United 1–0 to reach the first round. In the first round, Shields met League One side Forest Green Rovers at home, a match that would be televised on the BBC. South Shields lost 2–0 in front of a club record attendance of 3,800. On 10 April 2023, South Shields defeated Whitby Town 1–0 to clinch the Northern Premier League title and earn promotion to the National League North, to be their first season in the sixth tier since their reforming in 1974.

==== National League North ====
Following promotion, Phillips left the club by mutual consent and was replaced by Julio Arca. The 2023–24 season started brightly. However, Arca was dismissed on 27 December 2023 with South Shields in 8th-place in the National League North after an eight-game winless run in all competitions.

Initially brought in on an interim basis, academy boss and U19's coach Elliott Dickman took the reins after the club had dropped into mid-table. However a strong end to the season which saw a run of 12 wins in the final 20 games saw South Shields make a late run for a play-off place. Despite missing out on the play-offs by one point, Dickman signed a two-year contract.

== Stadium ==
South Shields play their home games at Mariners Park situated on the Simonside Industrial Estate, South Shields. The stadium has been known as the 1st Cloud Arena for sponsorship reasons since 2020. This deal was extended until at least summer 2025. It has a capacity of around 4,000 with just under 1,100 seats across two seated stands. It includes 3 bars (one within a large marquee), a hospitality lounge with balcony, 15 executive boxes and a club shop. The ground was home to the Filtrona factory's works football team before previous chairman John Rundle bought the facility and moved Shields in during the summer of 1992. Before this, the club used rented council facilities like The Nook but spent the majority of their existence sharing Jack Clark Park with Marsden cricket club.

The club were forced to leave the facility after the 2012–13 season by the former chairman who still acted as landlord until funds or a buyer could be found. During this, the club played their games at Eden Lane, the former home of Peterlee Newtown FC for two seasons. This was before current chairman Geoff Thompson bought the Filtrona Park premises in May 2015 and moved the club back in.

The ground is within a two-minute walk of the nearest Tyne & Wear Metro station, that being Bede.

== Club colours ==
The home colours of South Shields are claret and blue shirts and white shorts; this harks back to the colours worn by the first incarnation of the club just before the move to Gateshead in 1930 and also the first known colours of that first incarnation of the club as early as 1905 when they were known as South Shields Adelaide. The current club (when reformed in 1974) played in Dundee United style tangerine and black before altering to claret and blue at some point during the mid-1980s.

The previous incarnations of the club played (for the vast majority of their existences) in green, white and red which was an ode to the town's booming shipbuilding industry in the early part of the 20th century, red and green being the indicating colours for Port and Starboard respectively. In 1924, the club switched to blue and white before the switch to claret and blue in 1929. The second incarnation when formed in 1936 played in red and green quarters until the early 1960s when the club mirrored Leeds United's change in colours to all white with blue trim. They finished their existence in the town in 1974 reverting to all red.

When the club left to form Gateshead United in 1974, they switched again to white and green, they would fold in 1977.

== Club crest ==
From the reformation in 1974 until 2018, the club adopted the town's coat of arms as its badge. This was a crest prevalent throughout the borough being used as the emblem of the towns borough council and the local bus company, South Shields Corporation Transport until its absorption by the newly created Tyne & Wear PTE in 1970.

In 2018, to launch its own marketable image, the club introduced its own current crest. It is a traditional roundel coloured in claret and blue made unique by it overlapping an anchor, a nod to the town's maritime heritage. The "Always Ready" motif is retained from the town's coat of arms and within the anchor are waves of blue and white, depicting the Tyne Lifeboat which is preserved as a display on Ocean Road. The 1888 on the bottom represents the year of the earliest known occasion of a football club representing the town and not the current clubs formation which was in 1974.

== Club officials ==
Board

- Majority Owner: Jason Ye
- Chairman: Geoff Thompson
- Vice chairman: Gary Crutwell
- Honorary President: Jade Thirlwall
- Honorary President: David Miliband
- General Manager: Steve Camm
- Non-executive director: Paul Macpherson
- Non-executive director: Joanne Howe

Management and backroom staff

- First team manager: Mike Williamson
- Assistant manager: Stephen Harrison
- First Team coach: Jack Sadler
- Goalkeeper coach: Phil Naisbett
- Club physiotherapist: Jamie Sinclair
- Womens team manager: Rhiannon Gray
- Womens team assistant manager: Cameron Convey
- Womens team operations manager: Alex Miller
- Womens team general manager: Michael Gowans

== Players ==
=== Current squad ===
As of 24 August 2026

Note: Flags indicate national team as defined under FIFA eligibility rules; some limited exceptions apply. Players may hold more than one non-FIFA nationality.

No.	Pos.	Nation	Player
1	GK	ENG	Jasper Sheik
2	DF	ENG	Robbie Tinkler (captain)
3	DF	ENG	Jordan Marshall
4	DF	ENG	Cain Sykes
5	DF	ENG	Dillon Morse
6	MF	RSA	Khanya Leshabela
8	MF	ENG	Toby Onanaye
9	FW	ENG	Paul Blackett
10	MF	CYP	Jack Roles
11	FW	ENG	Sean McGurk
14	DF	ENG	Ethan Mann

No.	Pos.	Nation	Player
17	FW	ENG	Kyle Crossley
19	FW	ENG	Cedwyn Scott
20	FW	ENG	Sam Ashford
21	MF	ENG	Caden Kelly
22	FW	ENG	Chinonso Chibueze (on loan from Stoke City)
23	DF	ENG	Evan Blaney
24	GK	ENG	Will Anderson (out on loan at Newcastle Blue Star)
28	MF	ENG	Dan Savage
29	DF	ENG	Daniel Dodds
30	MF	ENG	David Carson
-	DF	ENG	Owen Jordan

== Team records ==
- FA Cup best performance: First round, 2020–21, 2022–23, 2025–26.
- FA Trophy best performance: Third round, 2025–26
- FA Vase best performance: Winners, 2016–17
- Record attendance: 4,000 vs. Sunderland, 2023–24, Pre-season friendly
- Largest victory: 14–0 vs. Murton Colliery Welfare, 1984–85, Wearside League Division One
- Heaviest defeat: 0–11 vs. Shildon, 2012–13, Northern League Division One

== Individual records ==
- Record goalscorer: Paul Thompson, 247 goals
- Record appearances: Robert Briggs, 457 appearances
- Record clean sheets: Myles Boney, 80 clean sheets

== Top 10 attendances ==
Rank	Match	Competition	Date	Attendance	Ref
1	South Shields 3–4 Sunderland	Pre-season friendly	8th July 2023	4,000	
2	South Shields 0–2 Forest Green Rovers	2022–23 FA Cup first round	5th November 2022	3,800	
2	South Shields 0–5 Sunderland	Pre-season friendly	13th July 2024	3,800	
2	South Shields 0–4 Sunderland	Pre-season friendly	12th July 2025	3,800	
5	South Shields 0–2 Kidderminster Harriers	2025-26 National League North Playoff Final	9th May 2026	3,628	
6	South Shields 1–3 Shrewsbury Town	2025–26 FA Cup first round	2nd November 2025	3,570	
7	South Shields 4–0 Coleshill Town	2016–17 FA Vase semi-final second leg	18th March 2017	3,464	
8	South Shields 0–1 Darlington	2025-26 National League North	6th April 2026	3,300	
9	South Shields 5–3 FC United of Manchester	2019–20 NPL Premier Division	14th March 2020	3,274	
10	South Shields 0–2 Sunderland	Pre-season friendly	11th July 2019	3,261	

== Sponsorship ==
Period	Kit Supplier	Main Sponsor	Rear Sponsor	Sleeve Sponsor
1974–88	?	?	None	None
1988–91	Umbro	Anglia Windows	None	None
1991–93	Umbro	Northumbria Windows	None	None
1993–95	Umbro	Reg Vardy	None	None
1995–97	Umbro	Vaux Samson	None	None
1997–2000	?	Dicksons Pork Butchers	None	None
2000–01	Avec	Wimpey Homes	None	None
2001–04	Paulas Benara	Wimpey Homes	None	None
2004–05	Prostar	-	None	None
2005–06	Prostar	Complete Seal Windows	None	None
2006–07	Prostar	Ashley Bathrooms	None	None
2007–09	Nike	Ashley Timber	None	None
2009–11	Nike	Port of Tyne	None	None
2011–13	Macron	Complete Soccer Academy	None	None
2013–14	Stanno	Westoe Lettings	None	None
2014–15	Stanno	Westoe Dental Practice	None	None
2015–16	Nike	Site For Eyes	None	None
2016–17	Nike	Site For Eyes	Jennings Ford Dealers	None
2017–18	Errea	Site For Eyes	Jennings Ford Dealers	None
2018–19	Puma	Business Energy Claims	Jennings Ford Dealers	None
2019–21	Puma	Business Energy Claims	Pulman Volkswagen	None
2021–22	Nike	CEFO Group (CFS)	Pulman Volkswagen	None
2022–23	Nike	Pulman Volkswagen	Darling's Pharmacy	None
2023–24	Umbro	Pulman Volkswagen	Darling's Pharmacy	Wyvestows Bar Bistro
2024-26	Umbro	Pulman Volkswagen	Shaun Mathias Decorating Centre	MBS Protection Services
2026–	Hummel	Pulman Volkswagen	Shaun Mathias Decorating Centre	MBS Protection Services

== Honours ==
League

- Northern Premier League (level 7)
  - Champions: 2022–23
- Northern Premier League Division One North (level 8)
  - Champions: 2017–18
- Northern League (level 9)
  - Champions: 2016–17
- Northern League Division Two (level 10)
  - Champions: 2015–16
- Wearside League
  - Champions: 1976–77, 1992–93, 1994–95
- Northern Football Alliance
  - Champions: 1974–75, 1975–76

Cup

- FA Vase
  - Winners: 2016–17
- Durham Challenge Cup
  - Winners: 1976–77, 2016–17
- Northern League, League Cup
  - Winners: 2009–10, 2016–17
- Wearside League Cup
  - Winners: 1992–93
- Monkwearmouth Charity Cup
  - Winners: 1986–87
- Sunderland Shipowners Cup
  - Winners: 1992–93
- J.R. Cleator Cup
  - Winners: 2009–10
