= Ben Dawson =

English football coach (born 1981)

Personal information
- Date of birth: 11 February 1981 (age 45)

Managerial career
- Years: Team
- 2019: Newcastle United (caretaker)
- 2024: Leicester City (caretaker)

Ben Dawson (born 11 February 1981) is an English football coach. He is currently a first-team coach of Danish Superliga club Brøndby.

He held various positions at Newcastle United from 2009 to 2024, before moving to Leicester City as a first-team coach from 2024 to 2025.

== Career ==
Dawson joined Newcastle United's academy in 2009. He left three years later for a job with the Football Association, and returned to Newcastle in 2014 as assistant to Peter Beardsley in the under-21 team.

In January 2018, Beardsley was suspended due to an inquiry into accusations about his conduct towards players, and Dawson became manager of the team. His team topped their group in the EFL Trophy in 2018–19, and met the senior side of northeast rivals Sunderland in the third round on 8 January, losing 4–0 at the Stadium of Light. In the league, the under-21s reached the play-off final for promotion from the Second Division of Premier League 2, but lost 2–1 away to Southampton.

Dawson then returned to Newcastle's academy. In July 2019, he led the first team on a tour of China between the exit of Rafael Benítez and appointment of Steve Bruce. He formed part of the coaching staff of Bruce, interim manager Graeme Jones, and Eddie Howe.

In July 2024, Dawson moved to Leicester City as part of the staff of Steve Cooper. Cooper was sacked on 24 November and Dawson was appointed caretaker manager. He criticised the players for their conduct at their Christmas party in Copenhagen after Cooper's last match, and said they had been "dealt with". On 30 November, in his one game before Ruud van Nistelrooy took over, Leicester lost 4–1 away to Brentford in the Premier League. Dawson and Danny Alcock – who had joined Cooper's team at the same time – left on 24 February 2025.

In September 2025, Dawson was hired as Cooper's assistant at Brøndby IF in the Danish Superliga.

== Managerial statistics ==
As of 30 November 2024

Managerial record by team and tenure
Team	From	To	Record					Ref
Team	From	To	P	W	D	L	Win %	Ref
Leicester City (caretaker)	24 November 2024	30 November 2024	1	0	0	1	0.0	
Total			1	0	0	1	0.0	—
