= Kangasniemi (surname) =

Kangasniemi is a Finnish surname that may refer to

- Antti Kangasniemi (born 1985), Finnish ice hockey player
- Kaarlo Kangasniemi (born 1941), Finnish weightlifter
- Kauko Kangasniemi (1942–2013), Finnish weightlifter, brother of Kaarlo
- Taisto Kangasniemi (1924–1997), Finnish wrestler
- Tapio Kangasniemi (born 1979), Finnish volleyball player
