= Louis Page =

Louis Page may refer to:

- Louis Coues Page (1869–1959), Swiss-born American businessman and publisher
- Louis Page (footballer, born 1899) (1899–1959), English footballer and manager
- Louis Page (cinematographer) (1905–1990), French cinematographer
- Louis Page (footballer, born 2008), English footballer
