= Harry Howell (footballer) =

English footballer (born 2008)

Personal information
- Full name: Harry John Howell
- Date of birth: 20 April 2008 (age 18)
- Place of birth: Worthing, England
- Height: 1.78 m (5 ft 10 in)
- Position: Attacking midfielder

Team information
- Current team: Leicester City (on loan from Brighton & Hove Albion)
- Number: 20

Youth career
- 2015–2026: Brighton & Hove Albion

Senior career*
Years	Team	Apps	(Gls)
2025–	Brighton & Hove Albion	4	(0)
2026–	→ Leicester City (loan)	9	(1)

International career^{‡}
2023–2024	England U16	10	(1)
2024–	England U17	10	(4)
2025–	England U18	5	(0)
2026–	England U19	3	(1)
- * Club domestic league appearances and goals as of 21 November 2026 ‡ National team caps and goals as of 14:40, 3 June 2026 (UTC)

Harry John Howell (born 20 April 2008) is an English professional footballer who plays as an attacking midfielder for EFL League One club Leicester City, on loan from Premier League club Brighton & Hove Albion.

== Early life ==
Howell is from Worthing, West Sussex and attended St Philip Howard Catholic School in Barnham.

== Club career ==
Howell began his footballing career in the Brighton youth academy at the age of 7 years-old. At the age of 14 years-old, he was given his debut for Brighton under-18s, where he helped his side to a 2–1 victory against Leicester City U18. During the 2023–24 season he was promoted to Brighton U21. In the Round of 16 of the EFL Trophy, he was substituted on for the final minutes against Reading, and when the fixture went to a penalty shoot-out, and still only 15 years-old, he scored to win the shootout 3–2 for Brighton. In the 2024–25 season he scored a brace against in the EFL Trophy against League One side Wycombe Wanderers. Howell was named the winner of the Premier League 2 player of the month award for December 2024 after he scored a hat-trick and contributed an assist in the 5–1 win over Tottenham Hotspur.

Howell was named in a first-team match day squad for Brighton for the first time in the Premier League as a substitute for their fixture against Leicester City on 12 April 2025, while still aged 16. He made his Premier League debut when he came on as a substitute versus Liverpool on 19 May. He signed his first professional contract with the club on 8 July.

On 13 August 2026, Howell signed a new contract with Brighton & Hove Albion until June 2029 before joining EFL League One club Leicester City on a season-long loan. On 1 September, Howell scored his first professional goal in a 2–0 win against Plymouth Argyle in the league.

== International career ==
Howell made his England U16 debut on 22 August 2023, at the age of 15 years, four months, and two days. He made a total of ten appearances at this age level and scored one goal in a game against South Korea. He was given his England U17 debut on 4 September 2024, at the age of 16 years, four months, and 15 days. On his debut, he scored a brace against Mexico U17. Howell was included in the squad for the 2025 UEFA European Under-17 Championship and scored a goal in their last group game against Czech Republic. Later that year he missed the 2025 FIFA U-17 World Cup due to injury.

On 3 September 2025, Howell made his England U18 debut during a 3–1 win over Uzbekistan.

On 25 March 2026, Howell made his England U19 debut during a 2-0 2026 UEFA European Under-19 Championship qualification defeat to Serbia.

== Style of play ==
He is left-footed and considered capable of playing on either wing, attacking midfield, or in the centre-forward position.

== Career statistics ==
As of match played 21 November 2026

Appearances and goals by club, season and competition
Club	Season	League			FA Cup		EFL Cup		Other		Total	
Club	Season	Division	Apps	Goals	Apps	Goals	Apps	Goals	Apps	Goals	Apps	Goals
Brighton & Hove Albion U21s	2023–24	—							1 (Note: Appearance(s) in EFL Trophy)	0	1	0
Brighton & Hove Albion U21s	2024–25	—							2	2	2	2
Brighton & Hove Albion U21s	Total	—							3	2	3	2
Brighton & Hove Albion	2024–25	Premier League	1	0	0	0	0	0	—		1	0
Brighton & Hove Albion	2025–26	Premier League	3	0	1	0	2	1	—		2	1
Brighton & Hove Albion	Total		4	0	1	0	2	1	—		7	1
Leicester City (loan)	2026–27	League One	9	1	1	0	1	0	1	0	12	1
Career total			13	1	2	0	3	1	4	2	22	4

== Personal life ==
Howell is the son of Carly and former Arsenal youth prospect Jamie Howell who was part of the Arsenal team that won the FA Youth Cup in 1993–94 and who went on to play for ten years at Bognor Regis Town, where he also later became assistant-manager. He is the cousin of fellow-Brighton footballer Jack Hinshelwood and nephew of Carly's brother Adam Hinshelwood.

== Honours ==
Individual

- Premier League 2 Player of the Month: December 2024
