= 2026–27 Leicester City F.C. season =

Leicester City
2026–27 season
- Owner: King Power
- Chairman: Aiyawatt Srivaddhanaprabha
- Manager: Russell Martin
- Stadium: King Power Stadium
- League One: 10th
- FA Cup: Second round
- EFL Cup: Second round
- EFL Trophy: Round of 32
- Top goalscorer: League: Emil Riis (6); All: Emil Riis (8)
- Biggest win: 6–1 v. Fulham U21 (H) (22 September 2026, EFL Trophy)
- Biggest defeat: 0–4 v. Oxford United (H) (5 September 2026, League One)
Home colours	Away colours	Third colours

The 2026–27 season is the 122nd season in the existence of Leicester City, and their second (non-consecutive) season in the third tier of English football. This season marked the club's first return to League One since the 2008–09 season following relegation from the Championship in the previous season. In addition to the domestic league, they will also compete in the FA Cup, the EFL Cup, and the EFL Trophy. This season covers the latter period from 1 July 2026 to 30 June 2027.

== Review ==
=== Background ===
The 2025–26 campaign was a disastrous season for Leicester City, as they had been relegated from the EFL Championship, following a 2–2 home draw to Hull City on 21 April 2026.

They scored 58 goals all season, and conceded 68, which is the highest number of goals they have conceded in an EFL Championship season in their history. They finished with a goal difference of -10, which was the worst in their EFL Championship history. Leicester's defensive issues from the season prior had continued, with only 3 clean sheets at home and 4 clean sheets away. They became the 5th team after Swindon Town, Wolverhampton Wanderers, Sunderland and Luton Town to suffer back-to-back relegations from the Premier League.

Leicester won twelve EFL Championship games in the 2025–26 season, drew 16, and lost 18, with a 6 point deduction imposed for breaching PSR rules during the 2023–24 season, relegating them on 46 points and finishing 23rd.

=== Pre-season ===
On 15 June 2026, Russell Martin was appointed as Leicester's new manager on a three-year contract. Prior to the start of the season, the club announced that the full allocation of 23,500 season tickets had been sold, with the initial cap of 22,292 increased due to demand.

Leicester played their first pre-season friendly against Northampton Town on 11 July 2026 at Seagrave, winning 3–0 from an early Stephy Mavididi goal and a Will Alves brace.

Leicester then travelled to the Memorial Stadium to take on Bristol Rovers in another pre-season friendly on 14 July 2026. Leicester won the game 2–1, with an early goal from Kirsten Otchere, a leveller from Ellis Harrison for the hosts, and a winner from Opoku in the 2nd quarter, as the game was played in 4 quarters of 30 minutes each.

== Management team ==
Position	Name
Manager	(Scotland) Russell Martin
First team coach	(Wales) Andy King
First team coach & Loans manager	(Wales) Steve Morison
Goalkeeping coach	(England) Tom Weal
Fitness Coach	(Wales) Rhys Owen

== Players ==
=== Squad information ===
Players and squad numbers last updated on 1 October 2026. Appearances include all competitions.
Note: Flags indicate national team as has been defined under FIFA eligibility rules. Players may hold more than one non-FIFA nationality.

Number	Player	Nationality	Position(s)	Date of birth (age)	Signed in	Contract ends	Signed from	Appearances	Goals
Goalkeepers
1	Jakub Stolarczyk	(Poland)	GK	19 December 2000 (age 25)	2019	2027	Youth Academy	58	0
13	David Cornell	(Wales)	GK	28 March 1991 (age 35)	2026	2027	(England) Preston North End	0	0
21	Franco Ravizzoli	(Argentina)	GK	9 July 1997 (age 29)	2026	2029	(England) Blackpool	0	0
29	Alex McCarthy	(England)	GK	3 December 1989 (age 36)	2026	2028	(England) Southampton	0	0
Defenders
2	Jayden Joseph	(England)	RB	29 April 2006 (age 20)	2024	2030	Youth Academy	0	0
4	Ben Nelson	(England)	CB	18 March 2004 (age 22)	2021	2027	Youth Academy	36	2
5	Caleb Okoli	(Italy)	CB	13 July 2001 (age 25)	2024	2029	(Italy) Atalanta	54	2
15	Harry Souttar (c)	(Australia)	CB	22 October 1998 (age 28)	2023	2028	(England) Stoke City	18	1
16	Warren O'Hora	(Republic of Ireland)	CB	19 April 1999 (age 27)	2026	2029	(Scotland) Hibernian	0	0
18	Christian McFarlane	(England)	LB	25 January 2007 (age 19)	2026	2027	(England) Manchester City (loan)	0	0
24	Ilari Kangasniemi	(Finland)	CB	22 April 2007 (age 19)	2026	2031	(Finland) Inter Turku	0	0
26	Woyo Coulibaly	(Mali)	RB	26 May 1999 (age 27)	2025	2029	(Italy) Parma	5	0
32	Olabade Aluko	(England)	RB	30 November 2006 (age 19)	2025	–	Youth Academy	11	0
33	Luke Thomas	(England)	LB	10 June 2001 (age 25)	2020	2029	Youth Academy	149	3
Midfielders
6	John Lundstram	(England)	DM	18 February 1994 (age 32)	2026	2028	(Turkey) Trabzonspor	0	0
8	Conor Chaplin	(England)	AM	16 February 1997 (age 29)	2026	2029	(England) Ipswich Town	0	0
11	Liam Cullen	(Wales)	AM / RM / CF	23 April 1999 (age 27)	2026	2029	(Wales) Swansea City	0	0
12	Will Smallbone	(Republic of Ireland)	CM	21 February 2000 (age 26)	2026	2029	(England) Southampton	0	0
20	Harry Howell	(England)	AM/ RW	20 April 2008 (age 18)	2026	2027	(England) Brighton & Hove Albion (loan)	0	0
25	Louis Page	(England)	CM / AM	10 July 2008 (age 18)	2025	–	Youth Academy	21	0
27	Kamari Doyle	(England)	AM	1 August 2005 (age 21)	2026	2027	(England) Brighton & Hove Albion (loan)	0	0
36	Sammy Braybrooke	(England)	CM	12 March 2004 (age 22)	2022	2027	Youth Academy	1	0
37	Will Alves	(England)	AM	4 May 2005 (age 21)	2022	2028	Youth Academy	5	0
Attackers
7	Wes Burns	(Wales)	RW	23 November 1994 (age 31)	2026	2029	(England) Ipswich Town	0	0
9	Admir Bristrić	(Bosnia and Herzegovina)	ST	28 April 2003 (age 23)	2026	2030	(Slovenia) Olimpija Ljubljana	0	0
14	Bobby De Cordova-Reid	(Jamaica)	CF / LW	2 February 1993 (age 33)	2024	2027	(England) Fulham	63	7
17	Emil Riis	(Denmark)	ST	24 June 1998 (age 28)	2026	2030	(England) Bristol City	0	0
23	Tommy Watson	(England)	LW	8 April 2006 (age 20)	2026	2027	(England) Brighton & Hove Albion (loan)	0	0
Out on loan
10	Stephy Mavididi	(England)	LW	31 May 1998 (age 28)	2023	2028	(France) Montpellier	126	23
	Victor Kristiansen	(Denmark)	LB	16 December 2002 (age 23)	2023	2028	(Denmark) Copenhagen	51	0
22	Oliver Skipp	(England)	DM	16 September 2000 (age 26)	2024	2029	(England) Tottenham Hotspur	65	2
34	Michael Golding	(England)	CM	23 March 2006 (age 20)	2024	2028	(England) Chelsea	1	0
61	Stevie Bausor	(England)	GK	11 May 2005 (age 21)	2025	–	Youth Academy	0	0
65	Jake Evans	(England)	ST / RW	21 August 2008 (age 18)	2025	2029	Youth Academy	4	0

== Transfers ==
=== In ===
Date	Position	Nationality	Player	From	Fee	Team	Ref.
16 July 2026	CAM	(England)	Conor Chaplin	(England) Ipswich Town	Free	First Team	
16 July 2026	GK	(England)	Alex McCarthy	(England) Southampton	Free	First Team	
31 July 2026	FW	(Wales)	Liam Cullen	(Wales) Swansea City	Undisclosed	First Team	
6 August 2026	RW	(Wales)	Wes Burns	(England) Ipswich Town	Undisclosed	First Team	
10 August 2026	GK	(Argentina)	Franco Ravizzoli	(England) Blackpool	Free	First Team	
11 August 2026	ST	(Bosnia and Herzegovina)	Admir Bristrić	(Slovenia) Olimpija Ljubljana	Undisclosed	First Team	
26 August 2026	CB	(Finland)	Ilari Kangasniemi	(Finland) Inter Turku	Undisclosed	First Team	
1 September 2026	CF	(Denmark)	Emil Riis	(England) Bristol City	Undisclosed	First Team	
1 September 2026	DM	(England)	John Lundstram	(Turkey) Trabzonspor	Free	First Team	
2 September 2026	CB	(Republic of Ireland)	Warren O'Hora	(Scotland) Hibernian	Undisclosed	First Team	
18 September 2026	GK	(Wales)	David Cornell	(England) Preston North End	Free	First Team	
1 October 2026	CM	(Republic of Ireland)	Will Smallbone	(England) Southampton	Free	First Team	

=== Out ===
Date	Position	Nationality	Player	To	Fee	Team	Ref.
30 June 2026	FW	(Ghana)	Jordan Ayew	(England) Sheffield United	End of contract	First team	
30 June 2026	GK	(Bosnia and Herzegovina)	Asmir Begović		End of contract	First team	
30 June 2026	CF	(Zambia)	Patson Daka	(Germany) Hamburger SV	End of contract	First team	
30 June 2026	GK	(England)	Jake Donohue		Released	Academy	
30 June 2026	CAM	(England)	Alfie Fisken		Released	Academy	
30 June 2026	CB	(England)	Jamaal Lascelles		End of contract	First team	
30 June 2026	LB	(England)	Jahmari Lindsay	(England) King's Lynn Town	Released	Academy	
30 June 2026	RW	(Portugal)	Wanya Marçal	(England) Stevenage	End of contract	First team	
30 June 2026	LW	(England)	Laolu Omobolaji		Released	Academy	
30 June 2026	CM	(England)	Toby Onanaye	(England) South Shields	Released	Academy	
30 June 2026	RB	(Portugal)	Ricardo Pereira		End of contract	First team	
30 June 2026	CF	(Wales)	Chris Popov	(England) Hartlepool United	Released	Academy	
30 June 2026	RW	(England)	Silko Thomas	(England) Wycombe Wanderers	End of contract	First team	
1 July 2026	AM	(Morocco)	Bilal El Khannouss	(Germany) VfB Stuttgart	£15,300,000	First Team	
3 July 2026	DM	(England)	Henry Cartwright	(England) Bradford City	Undisclosed	Academy	
11 July 2026	LW	(England)	Jeremy Monga	(England) Manchester City	£10,000,000	First Team	
15 July 2026	CF	(England)	Amani Richards	(England) Barnsley	Undisclosed	Academy	
15 July 2026	CDM	(England)	Harry Winks	(Italy) Cagliari	Undisclosed	First Team	
16 July 2026	CB	(Denmark)	Jannik Vestergaard	Retired		First Team	
21 July 2026	RW	(Ghana)	Abdul Fatawu	(England) Ipswich Town	£20,000,000	First Team	
8 August 2026	GK	(Spain)	Fran Vieites	(Portugal) Marítimo	Mutual Agreement	First Team	
11 August 2026	CB	(England)	Tom Wilson-Brown	(England) Stockport County	Undisclosed	First Team	
21 August 2026	CF	(Ghana)	Nathan Opoku	(England) Northampton Town	Undisclosed	First Team	
31 August 2026	DM	(Bangladesh)	Hamza Choudhury	(England) Sheffield United	Undisclosed	First Team	
28 September 2026	CB	(Belgium)	Wout Faes	(United Arab Emirates) Shabab Al Ahli	Undisclosed	First Team	

=== Loaned in ===
Date	Position	Player	From	Date until	Ref.
29 July 2026	LB	(England) Christian McFarlane	(England) Manchester City	End of Season	
1 August 2026	LW	(England) Tommy Watson	(England) Brighton & Hove Albion	End of Season	
13 August 2026	CAM	(England) Harry Howell	(England) Brighton & Hove Albion	End of Season	
1 September 2026	CAM	(England) Kamari Doyle	(England) Brighton & Hove Albion	End of Season	

=== Loaned out ===
Date	Position	Nat.	Player	To	Date until	Team	Ref.
2 July 2026	CAM	(Wales)	Logan Briggs	(England) Northampton Town	End of Season	Academy	
13 July 2026	LB	(Denmark)	Victor Kristiansen	(Greece) Panathinaikos	End of Season	First team	
4 August 2026	ST	(England)	Kirsten Otchere	(England) Cheltenham Town	End of Season	Academy	
10 August 2026	CF	(England)	Jake Evans	(England) Cheltenham Town	End of Season	Academy	
28 August 2026	CM	(England)	Michael Golding	(England) Shrewsbury Town	End of Season	Academy	
1 September 2026	LW	(England)	Stephy Mavididi	(England) Watford	End of Season	First team	
1 September 2026	CDM	(England)	Oliver Skipp	(England) Charlton Athletic	End of Season	First team	
3 September 2026	GK	(England)	Stevie Bausor	(England) Slough Town	30 September 2026	Academy	
11 September 2026	CB	(Ghana)	Bobby Amartey	(England) Sutton United	30 November 2026	Academy	

== Pre-season and friendlies ==
On 12 June 2026, The Foxes announced two pre-season friendlies against Northampton Town and Burton Albion. Three days later, a visit to Bristol Rovers was confirmed. On 2 July 2026, The Foxes announced three more pre-season friendlies against Cádiz, Málaga and Genoa.

Win Draw Loss Fixtures

11 July 2026 Friendly	Leicester City	3–0	Northampton Town	Seagrave
12:00 BST	Mavididi 6'; Alves 17', 22'	Report		Stadium: Seagrave Training Ground

14 July 2026 Friendly	Bristol Rovers	1–2	Leicester City	Horfield
19:00 BST	Harrison 35'	Report	Otchere 4'; Opoku 78'	Stadium: Memorial Stadium
Note: Game was played in 4 quarters of 30 minutes each.

18 July 2026 Friendly	Burton Albion	0−3	Leicester City	Burton upon Trent
13:00 BST		Report	Otchere 45+3'; Alves 65'; Opoku 80'	Stadium: Pirelli Stadium
Note: Game was played in 4 quarters of 30 minutes each.

22 July 2026 Friendly	Cádiz	0–1	Leicester City	Algeciras
19:00 CEST		Report	Otchere 52'	Stadium: Estadio Nuevo Mirador

25 July 2026 Friendly	Málaga	3–3	Leicester City	Marbella
19:00 CEST	Chupete 53'; Ochoa 68'; Dotor 90+3'	Report	Page 25'; Coulibaly 80'; Neale (yellow card) 85', (goal) 88'	Stadium: Banús Football Center

1 August 2026 Friendly	Leicester City	0–1	Coventry City	Seagrave
14:00 BST		Report	Latibeaudiere 80'	Stadium: Seagrave Training Ground

1 August 2026 Friendly	Leicester City	0−1	Genoa	Leicester
19:30 BST		Report	Colombo 69'	Stadium: King Power Stadium

== Competitions ==
=== Overall record ===
Competition	First match	Last match	Starting round	Final position	Record							
Competition	First match	Last match	Starting round	Final position	Pld	W	D	L	GF	GA	GD	Win %
EFL League One	15 August 2026	8 May 2027	Matchday 1		14	6	4	4	23	19	+4	42.86
FA Cup	6 November 2026		First round		1	1	0	0	4	2	+2	100.00
EFL Cup	8 August 2026	25 August 2026	First round	Second round	2	1	0	1	2	3	−1	50.00
EFL Trophy	22 September 2026		Group stage		3	2	0	1	9	4	+5	66.67
Total					20	10	4	6	38	28	+10	50.00

Last updated: 10 November 2026
Source: Soccerway

=== League One ===
==== League table ====
Pos	Team	Pld	W	D	L	GF	GA	GD	Pts
8	Reading	16	6	4	6	26	19	+7	22
9	Milton Keynes Dons	15	5	7	3	29	23	+6	22
10	Leicester City	14	6	4	4	23	19	+4	22
11	Cambridge United	15	5	6	4	21	24	−3	21
12	Leyton Orient	14	6	2	6	23	15	+8	20

Updated to match(es) played on 21 November 2026. Source: EFL Official Website
Rules for classification: 1) Points; 2) Goal difference; 3) Number of goals scored; 4) Head-to-head results; 5) Wins; 6) Away goals; 7) Penalty points (sec 9.5); 8) 12-point sending off offences

==== Results summary ====
Overall								Home						Away					
Pld	W	D	L	GF	GA	GD	Pts	W	D	L	GF	GA	GD	W	D	L	GF	GA	GD
14	6	4	4	23	19	+4	22	3	1	3	11	12	−1	3	3	1	12	7	+5

Last updated: 21 November 2026.
Source: Soccerway

==== Results by round ====
Round	1	2	3	4	5	6	7	10	11	12	13	8^{1}	14	15	16	9^{2}	17	18	19	20	21	22	23	24	25	26	27	28	29	30	31	32	33	34	35	36	37	38	39	40	41	42	43	44	45	46
Ground	A	H	A	H	H	A	A	H	H	A	A	H	H	H	A	A	H	A	H	A	H	A	A	H	A	H	H	A	H	A	A	H	A	H	A	H	H	A	H	A	A	H	A	H	A	H
Result	D	L	D	W	L	W	D	L	W	W	L	W	D	P	W																															
Position	11	18	21	13	18	13	13	17	14	10	13	11	10	P	10																															
Points	1	1	2	5	5	8	9	9	12	15	15	18	19	P	22																															

Source: Soccerway
A = Away; H = Home; W = Win; D = Draw; L = Loss; P = Postponed
Notes:
- ^{1} Matchday 8 (vs. Wigan Athletic) was postponed due to international call-ups.
- ^{2} Matchday 9 (vs. Blackpool) was postponed due to international call-ups.
- ^{2} Matchday 15 (vs. Bradford City) was postponed due to international call-ups.

==== Score overview ====
Opposition	Home score	Away score	Aggregate score	Double
AFC Wimbledon	26 December 2026	29 March 2027		
Barnsley	17 April 2027	1–1		No
Blackpool	27 April 2027	24 November 2026		
Bradford City	14 November 2026	27 February 2027		
Bromley	19 January 2027	4–0		
Burton Albion	1–2	13 March 2027		No
Cambridge United	8 May 2027	1 December 2026		
Doncaster Rovers	2–1	16 January 2027		
Huddersfield Town	20 March 2027	1–0		
Leyton Orient	29 December 2026	3 April 2027		
Luton Town	23 January 2027	1–2		No
Mansfield Town	1 May 2027	28 November 2026		
Milton Keynes Dons	6 February 2027	0–0		No
Notts County	6 March 2027	1–1		No
Oxford United	0–4	13 February 2027		No
Peterborough United	1–3	24 April 2027		No
Plymouth Argyle	2–0	9 February 2027		
Reading	9 January 2027	19 December 2026		
Sheffield Wednesday	10 December 2026	10 April 2027		
Stevenage	2–2	30 January 2027		No
Stockport County	20 February 2027	4–3		
Wigan Athletic	3–0	13 April 2027		
Wycombe Wanderers	26 March 2027	1 January 2027		

==== Matches ====
The fixtures for the 2026/27 season were released on Thursday 25 June 2026 at 12pm BST, and Leicester were scheduled to play Notts County on the opening weekend.

15 August 2026 1	Notts County	1–1	Leicester City	Nottingham
12:30 BST	Evans (yellow card) 15'; Gibbons (yellow card) 43'; Grant 81'	Report	Alves (yellow card) 44'; Joseph 62'	Stadium: Meadow Lane; Attendance: 17,172 (2,123 away); Referee: Edward Duckworth

22 August 2026 2	Leicester City	1–2	Burton Albion	Leicester
15:00 BST	Skipp (red card) 29'; Burns 42'; De Cordova-Reid (yellow card) 83'	Report	Dennis 5'; Tilt (yellow card) 17'; Chauke 25'; Krubally (yellow card) 63'; Lofthouse (yellow card) 74'	Stadium: King Power Stadium; Attendance: 27,744 (1,000 away); Referee: Ben Toner

29 August 2026 3	Milton Keynes Dons	0–0	Leicester City	Bletchley
12:30 BST		Report	Thomas (yellow card) 48'; Souttar (yellow card) 80'; Cullen (yellow card) 90+2'	Stadium: Stadium MK; Attendance: 16,198 (5,968 away); Referee: Thomas Parsons
Note: Fixture was initially scheduled for a 15:00 kick-off, but was moved for live Sky Sports broadcast.

1 September 2026 4	Leicester City	2–0	Plymouth Argyle	Leicester
19:45 BST	Joseph (yellow card) 43'; Alves 45+3'; Howell 45+5'; Souttar (yellow card) 87'; Braybrooke (yellow card) 90'	Report	Amaechi (yellow card) 38'	Stadium: King Power Stadium; Attendance: 27,744 (1,630 away); Referee: Harry Wager

5 September 2026 5	Leicester City	0–4	Oxford United	Leicester
15:00 BST	Riis (yellow card) 49'	Report	Harris 8', 60'; Andrews (yellow card) 34'; Missanga 57'; McDonnell 77'	Stadium: King Power Stadium; Attendance: 27,744 (2,000 away); Referee: Dean Whitestone

12 September 2026 6	Stockport County	3–4	Leicester City	Edgeley
15:00 BST	Diamond 22'; Pye (yellow card) 36'; Norwood 57'; Wootton 61'; Gordon (yellow card) 62'	Report	Cullen 11'; Riis 30', 48'; Page (yellow card) 50'; Lundstram 52'	Stadium: Edgeley Park; Attendance: 10,411 (1,152 away); Referee: Thomas Kirk

19 September 2026 7	Barnsley	1–1	Leicester City	Barnsley
12:30 BST	Connell (red card) 26'; Cleary 61'; Kelly (yellow card) 71'; Kay (yellow card) 89'; Bland (yellow card) 90+1'; Taylor (yellow card) 90+6'	Report	Cullen 7'; Aluko (yellow card) 11'; Alves (yellow card) 46'; Braybrooke (yellow card) 56'; Page (yellow card) 63'	Stadium: Oakwell; Attendance: 13,665 (4,341 away); Referee: Seb Stockbridge
Note: Fixture was initially scheduled for a 15:00 kick-off, but was moved for live Sky Sports broadcast.

10 October 2026 10	Leicester City	1–3	Peterborough United	Leicester
15:00 BST	Riis 68'	Report	Edwards 12'; Leonard 36'; O'Hora 44' (o.g.); Garbett (yellow card) 85'	Stadium: King Power Stadium; Attendance: 29,839 (3,200 away); Referee: Simon Hooper

17 October 2026 11	Leicester City	2–1	Doncaster Rovers	Leicester
15:00 BST	Thomas (yellow card) 17'; Lundstram 45+1'; Doyle 61'	Report	May (yellow card) 57', (goal) 84'; McGrath (yellow card) 59'; Ayinde (yellow card) 65'	Stadium: King Power Stadium; Attendance: 28,215 (2,271 away); Referee: Carl Brook

20 October 2026 12	Bromley	0–4	Leicester City	Bromley
19:45 BST	Saville (yellow card) 39'; Ifill (yellow card) 45+2'	Report	Alves 4'; Braybrooke (yellow card) 7'; Lundstram 16'; Thomas 45+2'; Riis (yellow card) 58', (goal) 67'	Stadium: Hayes Lane; Attendance: 4,938 (825 away); Referee: Alex Chilowicz

24 October 2026 13	Luton Town	2–1	Leicester City	Luton
12:30 BST	Wells 39'; Marshall 90+4'	Report	Lundstram (yellow card) 68' (yellow-red card) 85'; Cullen 90'; Burns (yellow card) 90+3'	Stadium: Kenilworth Road; Attendance: 11,693 (1,341 away); Referee: Martin Woods
Note: Fixture was initially scheduled for a 15:00 kick-off, but was moved for live Sky Sports broadcast.

27 October 2026 8	Leicester City	3–0	Wigan Athletic	Leicester
19:45 GMT	Smallbone (yellow card) 6'; Riis 17', 67'; Okoli (yellow card) 40'; Thomas (yellow card) 45+1'; O'Hora (yellow card) 48'; De Cordova-Reid 90+2' (pen.)	Report	Walsh (yellow card) 4'; Chilokoa-Mullen (yellow card) 9'; Miller (yellow card) 28'; Burns (yellow card) 61'	Stadium: King Power Stadium; Attendance: 26,511 (400 away); Referee: Leigh Doughty
Note: Fixture was initially scheduled for 26 September, but was moved due to international call-ups.

31 October 2026 14	Leicester City	2–2	Stevenage	Leicester
15:00 GMT	Braybrooke 2'; Doyle 66'	Report	Broggio 22'; Earley (yellow card) 30'; Turhan 78'	Stadium: King Power Stadium; Attendance: 26,941 (1,000 away); Referee: Stephen Parkinson

14 November 2026 15	Leicester City	Postponed	Bradford City	Leicester
15:00 GMT		Report		Stadium: King Power Stadium
Note: Fixture was postponed due to international call-ups.

21 November 2026 16	Huddersfield Town	0–1	Leicester City	Huddersfield
15:00 GMT		Report	Page 52'; Lundstram (yellow card) 69'; Riis (yellow card) 88'; Okoli (yellow card) 90+3'	Stadium: Kirklees Stadium; Attendance: 18,969 (2,336 away); Referee: Scott Oldham

24 November 2026 9	Blackpool	v	Leicester City	Blackpool
19:45 GMT		Report		Stadium: Bloomfield Road
Note: Fixture was initially scheduled for 3 October, but was rearranged due to international call-ups.

28 November 2026 17	Leicester City	v	Mansfield Town	Leicester
15:00 GMT		Report		Stadium: King Power Stadium

1 December 2026 18	Cambridge United	v	Leicester City	Cambridge
19:45 GMT		Report		Stadium: Cledara Abbey Stadium

10 December 2026 19	Leicester City	v	Sheffield Wednesday	Leicester
20:00 GMT		Report		Stadium: King Power Stadium
Note: Fixture was initially scheduled for 12 December, but was brought forward a couple days for live Sky Sports broadcasting.

19 December 2026 20	Reading	v	Leicester City	Reading
15:00 GMT		Report		Stadium: Select Car Leasing Stadium

26 December 2026 21	Leicester City	v	AFC Wimbledon	Leicester
15:00 GMT		Report		Stadium: King Power Stadium

29 December 2026 22	Leyton Orient	v	Leicester City	Leyton
19:45 GMT		Report		Stadium: BetWright Stadium

1 January 2027 23	Wycombe Wanderers	v	Leicester City	High Wycombe
15:00 GMT		Report		Stadium: Adams Park

9 January 2027 24	Leicester City	v	Reading	Leicester
15:00 GMT		Report		Stadium: King Power Stadium

16 January 2027 25	Doncaster Rovers	v	Leicester City	Doncaster
15:00 GMT		Report		Stadium: Eco-Power Stadium

19 January 2027 26	Leicester City	v	Bromley	Leicester
19:45 GMT		Report		Stadium: King Power Stadium

23 January 2027 27	Leicester City	v	Luton Town	Leicester
15:00 GMT		Report		Stadium: King Power Stadium

30 January 2027 28	Stevenage	v	Leicester City	Stevenage
15:00 GMT		Report		Stadium: SPORTA Arena

6 February 2027 29	Leicester City	v	Milton Keynes Dons	Leicester
12:30 GMT		Report		Stadium: King Power Stadium
Note: Fixture was initially scheduled for a 15:00 kick-off, but was brought forward for live Sky Sports broadcasting.

10 February 2027 30	Plymouth Argyle	v	Leicester City	Milehouse
19:45 GMT		Report		Stadium: Home Park
Note: Fixture was initially scheduled for 9 February, but was pushed back a night for live Sky Sports broadcasting.

13 February 2027 31	Oxford United	v	Leicester City	Littlemore
15:00 GMT		Report		Stadium: Kassam Stadium

20 February 2027 32	Leicester City	v	Stockport County	Leicester
12:30 GMT		Report		Stadium: King Power Stadium
Note: Fixture was initially scheduled for a 15:00 kick-off, but was brought forward for live Sky Sports broadcasting.

27 February 2027 33	Bradford City	v	Leicester City	Bradford
15:00 GMT		Report		Stadium: Mbanq Valley Parade

6 March 2027 34	Leicester City	v	Notts County	Leicester
15:00 GMT		Report		Stadium: King Power Stadium

13 March 2027 35	Burton Albion	v	Leicester City	Burton upon Trent
15:00 GMT		Report		Stadium: Pirelli Stadium

20 March 2027 36	Leicester City	v	Huddersfield Town	Leicester
15:00 GMT		Report		Stadium: King Power Stadium

26 March 2027 37	Leicester City	v	Wycombe Wanderers	Leicester
15:00 GMT		Report		Stadium: King Power Stadium

29 March 2027 38	AFC Wimbledon	v	Leicester City	Wimbledon
15:00 BST		Report		Stadium: Plough Lane

3 April 2027 39	Leicester City	v	Leyton Orient	Leicester
15:00 BST		Report		Stadium: King Power Stadium

10 April 2027 40	Sheffield Wednesday	v	Leicester City	Owlerton
15:00 BST		Report		Stadium: Hillsborough

13 April 2027 41	Wigan Athletic	v	Leicester City	Wigan
19:45 BST		Report		Stadium: Brick Community Stadium

17 April 2027 42	Leicester City	v	Barnsley	Leicester
15:00 BST		Report		Stadium: King Power Stadium

24 April 2027 43	Peterborough United	v	Leicester City	Fletton
15:00 BST		Report		Stadium: Weston Homes Stadium

27 April 2027 44	Leicester City	v	Blackpool	Leicester
19:45 BST		Report		Stadium: King Power Stadium

1 May 2027 45	Mansfield Town	v	Leicester City	Mansfield
15:00 BST		Report		Stadium: One Call Stadium

8 May 2027 46	Leicester City	v	Cambridge United	Leicester
12:30 BST		Report		Stadium: King Power Stadium

=== FA Cup ===
Leicester were drawn away to Oxford City in the first round. They were drawn away to Dover Athletic in the second round.

Win Draw Loss Fixtures

6 November 2026 First round	Oxford City	2–4	Leicester City	Marston
19:45 GMT	Pollock 31'; Ashby 62'	Report	Page 16'; Thomas (yellow card) 25'; Riis 53'; Doyle 59'; De Cordova-Reid (yellow card) 68'; Watson 82'	Stadium: MGroup Stadium; Attendance: 3,462 (600 away); Referee: Andrew Humphries

5 December 2026 Second round	Dover Athletic	v	Leicester City	River
17:15 GMT				Stadium: Crabble Athletic Ground
Note: Fixture was selected for live TNT Sports, HBO Max and BBC broadcasting.

=== EFL Cup ===
Leicester were drawn at home to Northampton Town in the first round and away to Ipswich Town in the second round.

Win Draw Loss Fixtures

8 August 2026 First round	Leicester City	1–0	Northampton Town	Leicester
15:00 BST	Okoli 15'; De Cordova-Reid (yellow card) 37'; Braybrooke (yellow card) 42'; Burns (yellow card) 83'; Watson (yellow card) 90+8'	Report	Saunders (yellow card) 90+3'	Stadium: King Power Stadium; Attendance: 9,792 (2,000 away); Referee: Ollie Yates

25 August 2026 Second round	Ipswich Town	3–1	Leicester City	Ipswich
19:45 BST	Humphreys (yellow card) 49'; Clarke (yellow card) 54'; Egeli 62'; Kipré (yellow card) 65'; Núñez 71', 90+1'	Report	Aluko (yellow card) 40', (goal) 67'; Page (yellow card) 70'	Stadium: Portman Road; Attendance: 21,559 (5,000 away); Referee: Lewis Smith

=== EFL Trophy ===
==== Group Stage ====
Leicester were drawn against Stevenage, Walsall and Fulham U21 into Southern Group B.

Pos	Div	Team	Pld	W	PW	PL	L	GF	GA	GD	Pts	Qualification
1	L1	Stevenage	3	2	1	0	0	10	4	+6	8	Advance to Round 2
2	L1	Leicester City	3	2	0	0	1	9	4	+5	6	Advance to Round 2
3	L2	Walsall	3	1	0	0	2	5	10	−5	3	
4	ACA	Fulham U21	3	0	0	1	2	5	11	−6	1	

Source: EFL

Win Draw Loss Fixtures

22 September 2026 Group stage	Leicester City	6–1	Fulham U21	Leicester
19:00 BST	Bristrić 15', 24', 34'; Watson 40', 45+2'; De Cordova-Reid 50'	Report	Chingwaro 45+4'	Stadium: King Power Stadium; Attendance: 1,706 (12 away); Referee: Lewis Sandoe

6 October 2026 Group stage	Stevenage	2–1	Leicester City	Stevenage
19:00 BST	Marçal 24'; Sanderson 59'	Report	Riis 69'	Stadium: Broadhall Way; Attendance: 2,162 (911 away); Referee: Emily Heaslip

10 November 2026 Group stage	Leicester City	2–1	Walsall	Leicester
19:00 GMT	Lundstram 20'; Smallbone 32'; Aluko (yellow card) 56'	Report	Dallas 10'	Stadium: King Power Stadium; Attendance: 3,083 (610 away); Referee: Michael Barlow

== Statistics ==
=== Appearances and goals ===
As of match played 21 November 2026

Players with no appearances are not included on the list; italics indicate a loaned in player

No.	Pos	Nat	Player	Total		League One		FA Cup		EFL Cup		EFL Trophy	
No.	Pos	Nat	Player	Apps	Goals	Apps	Goals	Apps	Goals	Apps	Goals	Apps	Goals
1	GK	(Poland) POL	Jakub Stolarczyk	4	0	2+0	0	0+0	0	2	0	0+0	0
2	DF	(England) ENG	Jayden Joseph	8	1	5+1	1	0+0	0	1+1	0	0+0	0
5	DF	(Italy) ITA	Caleb Okoli	12	1	9+0	0	1+0	0	1	1	1+0	0
6	MF	(England) ENG	John Lundstram	10	4	8+0	3	1+0	0	0	0	1+0	1
7	MF	(Wales) WAL	Wes Burns	13	1	4+7	1	0+0	0	0+2	0	0+0	0
8	MF	(England) ENG	Conor Chaplin	9	0	2+5	0	0+0	0	1	0	1+0	0
9	FW	(Bosnia and Herzegovina) BIH	Admir Bristrić	10	3	2+3	0	0+1	0	1	0	3+0	3
11	MF	(Wales) WAL	Liam Cullen	14	3	5+7	3	0+0	0	1+1	0	0+0	0
12	MF	(Republic of Ireland) IRL	Will Smallbone	6	1	2+3	0	0+0	0	0	0	1+0	1
13	GK	(Wales) WAL	David Cornell	1	0	0+0	0	0+0	0	0	0	1+0	0
14	FW	(Jamaica) JAM	Bobby De Cordova-Reid	17	2	5+6	1	1+0	0	1+1	0	1+2	1
15	DF	(Australia) AUS	Harry Souttar	14	0	12+0	0	0+0	0	1	0	1+0	0
16	DF	(Republic of Ireland) IRL	Warren O'Hora	12	0	9+0	0	1+0	0	0	0	2+0	0
17	FW	(Denmark) DEN	Emil Riis	12	8	10+0	6	1+0	1	0	0	0+1	1
18	DF	(England) ENG	Christian McFarlane	5	0	2+0	0	0+1	0	1	0	1+0	0
20	MF	(England) ENG	Harry Howell	12	1	1+8	1	0+1	0	1	0	0+1	0
21	GK	(Argentina) ARG	Franco Ravizzoli	3	0	0+0	0	1+0	0	0	0	2+0	0
23	MF	(England) ENG	Tommy Watson	13	3	1+6	0	0+1	1	1+1	0	3+0	2
24	DF	(Finland) FIN	Ilari Kangasniemi	4	0	0+3	0	1+0	0	0	0	0+0	0
25	MF	(England) ENG	Louis Page	15	2	11+1	1	1+0	1	1+1	0	0+0	0
26	DF	(Mali) MLI	Woyo Coulibaly	5	0	0+1	0	0+0	0	1	0	1+2	0
27	MF	(England) ENG	Kamari Doyle	12	3	6+2	2	1+0	1	0	0	3+0	0
29	GK	(England) ENG	Alex McCarthy	13	0	12+1	0	0+0	0	0	0	0+0	0
32	DF	(England) ENG	Olabade Aluko	13	1	3+4	0	0+1	0	1+1	1	3+0	0
33	DF	(England) ENG	Luke Thomas	20	1	14+0	1	1+0	0	2	0	2+1	0
36	MF	(England) ENG	Sammy Braybrooke	20	1	12+2	1	1+0	0	2	0	2+1	0
37	MF	(England) ENG	Will Alves	19	2	13+1	2	0+0	0	1+1	0	2+1	0
50	MF	(England) ENG	Tommy Neale	3	0	0+0	0	0+0	0	0	0	1+2	0
56	FW	(England) ENG	Lorenz Hutchinson	1	0	0+0	0	0+0	0	0	0	0+1	0
59	MF	(England) ENG	Will Lawrence	1	0	0+0	0	0+0	0	0	0	0+1	0
60	MF	(England) ENG	Riley Carr	1	0	0+0	0	0+0	0	0	0	1+0	0
Out on loan:
10	MF	(England) ENG	Stephy Mavididi	1	0	0+0	0	0+0	0	1+0	0	0+0	0
22	MF	(England) ENG	Oliver Skipp	3	0	2+0	0	0+0	0	1+0	0	0+0	0
Players who featured but departed the club permanently during the season:
3	DF	(Belgium) BEL	Wout Faes	1	0	1+0	0	0+0	0	0	0	0+0	0
17	MF	(Bangladesh) BAN	Hamza Choudhury	3	0	0+2	0	0+0	0	0+1	0	0+0	0

=== Goalscorers ===
As of match played 21 November 2026

Rank	No.	Pos.	Nat.	Player	League One	FA Cup	EFL Cup	EFL Trophy	Total
1	17	FW	(Denmark)	Emil Riis	6	1	0	1	8
2	6	MF	(England)	John Lundstram	3	0	0	1	4
3=	11	MF	(Wales)	Liam Cullen	3	0	0	0	3
3=	27	MF	(England)	Kamari Doyle	2	1	0	0	3
3=	23	MF	(England)	Tommy Watson	0	1	0	2	3
3=	9	FW	(Bosnia and Herzegovina)	Admir Bristrić	0	0	0	3	3
7=	37	MF	(England)	Will Alves	2	0	0	0	2
7=	25	MF	(England)	Louis Page	1	1	0	0	2
7=	14	FW	(Jamaica)	Bobby De Cordova-Reid	1	0	0	1	2
10=	2	DF	(England)	Jayden Joseph	1	0	0	0	1
10=	7	MF	(Wales)	Wes Burns	1	0	0	0	1
10=	20	MF	(England)	Harry Howell	1	0	0	0	1
10=	33	DF	(England)	Luke Thomas	1	0	0	0	1
10=	36	MF	(England)	Sammy Braybrooke	1	0	0	0	1
10=	5	DF	(Italy)	Caleb Okoli	0	0	1	0	1
10=	32	DF	(England)	Olabade Aluko	0	0	1	0	1
10=	12	MF	(Republic of Ireland)	Will Smallbone	0	0	0	1	1
Total					23	4	2	9	38

=== Assists ===
As of match played 21 November 2026

Rank	No.	Pos.	Nat.	Player	League One	FA Cup	EFL Cup	EFL Trophy	Total
1=	33	DF	(England)	Luke Thomas	4	0	1	0	5
1=	25	MF	(England)	Louis Page	3	2	0	0	5
1=	14	FW	(Jamaica)	Bobby De Cordova-Reid	0	1	1	3	5
4=	36	MF	(England)	Sammy Braybrooke	4	0	0	0	4
4=	37	MF	(England)	Will Alves	2	0	0	2	4
6=	7	MF	(Wales)	Wes Burns	1	0	0	0	1
6=	16	DF	(Republic of Ireland)	Warren O'Hora	1	0	0	0	1
6=	17	FW	(Denmark)	Emil Riis	1	0	0	0	1
6=	20	MF	(England)	Harry Howell	0	1	0	0	1
6=	15	DF	(Australia)	Harry Souttar	0	0	0	1	1
Total					16	4	2	6	28

=== Clean sheets ===
As of match played 21 November 2026

Rank	No.	Nat.	Player	League One	FA Cup	EFL Cup	EFL Trophy	Total
1	29	(England)	Alex McCarthy	3	0	0	0	3
2	1	(Poland)	Jakub Stolarczyk	1	0	1	0	2
Total				4	0	1	0	5

=== Disciplinary record ===
As of match played 21 November 2026

No.	Pos.	Nat.	Player	League One			FA Cup			EFL Cup			EFL Trophy			Total		
No.	Pos.	Nat.	Player	Yellow card	(yellow card) (yellow-red card)	Red card	Yellow card	(yellow card) (yellow-red card)	Red card	Yellow card	(yellow card) (yellow-red card)	Red card	Yellow card	(yellow card) (yellow-red card)	Red card	Yellow card	(yellow card) (yellow-red card)	Red card
2	DF	(England)	Jayden Joseph	1	0	0	0	0	0	0	0	0	0	0	0	1	0	0
5	DF	(Italy)	Caleb Okoli	2	0	0	0	0	0	0	0	0	0	0	0	2	0	0
6	MF	(England)	John Lundstram	1	1	0	0	0	0	0	0	0	0	0	0	1	1	0
7	MF	(Wales)	Wes Burns	1	0	0	0	0	0	1	0	0	0	0	0	2	0	0
11	MF	(Wales)	Liam Cullen	1	0	0	0	0	0	0	0	0	0	0	0	1	0	0
12	MF	(Republic of Ireland)	Will Smallbone	1	0	0	0	0	0	0	0	0	0	0	0	1	0	0
14	FW	(Jamaica)	Bobby De Cordova-Reid	1	0	0	1	0	0	1	0	0	0	0	0	3	0	0
15	DF	(Australia)	Harry Souttar	2	0	0	0	0	0	0	0	0	0	0	0	2	0	0
16	DF	(Republic of Ireland)	Warren O'Hora	1	0	0	0	0	0	0	0	0	0	0	0	1	0	0
17	FW	(Denmark)	Emil Riis	3	0	0	0	0	0	0	0	0	0	0	0	3	0	0
22	MF	(England)	Oliver Skipp	0	0	1	0	0	0	0	0	0	0	0	0	0	0	1
23	MF	(England)	Tommy Watson	0	0	0	0	0	0	1	0	0	0	0	0	1	0	0
25	MF	(England)	Louis Page	2	0	0	0	0	0	1	0	0	0	0	0	3	0	0
32	DF	(England)	Olabade Aluko	1	0	0	0	0	0	1	0	0	1	0	0	3	0	0
33	DF	(England)	Luke Thomas	3	0	0	1	0	0	0	0	0	0	0	0	4	0	0
36	MF	(England)	Sammy Braybrooke	3	0	0	0	0	0	1	0	0	0	0	0	4	0	0
37	MF	(England)	Will Alves	2	0	0	0	0	0	0	0	0	0	0	0	2	0	0
Total				25	1	1	2	0	0	6	0	0	1	0	0	34	1	1
