= Ilari Kangasniemi =

Finnish footballer (born 2007)

Personal information
- Full name: Ilari Akseli Kangasniemi
- Date of birth: 22 April 2007 (age 19)
- Place of birth: Seinäjoki, Finland
- Height: 1.99 m (6 ft 6 in)
- Position: Centre back

Team information
- Current team: Leicester City
- Number: 24

Youth career
- Sepsi-78
- –2023: SJK
- 2024–2025: Inter Milan

Senior career*
Years	Team	Apps	(Gls)
2022–2023	SJK Akatemia II	12	(0)
2023	SJK Akatemia	6	(0)
2025	Inter Turku II	4	(0)
2025–2026	Inter Turku	16	(1)
2026–	Leicester City	0	(0)

International career^{‡}
2023	Finland U16	2	(1)
2023–2024	Finland U17	12	(0)
2023	Finland U18	4	(0)
2024–2025	Finland U19	14	(1)
2026–	Finland U21	2	(0)
- * Club domestic league appearances and goals as of 25 August 2026 ‡ National team caps and goals as of 25 August 2026

Ilari Akseli Kangasniemi (born 2 May 2007) is a Finnish professional footballer who plays as a centre back for EFL League One club Leicester City.

== Early career ==
Kangasniemi began with local side Sepsi-78 before advanced through the ranks of the youth sector of SJK Seinäjoki.

In 2022, he made his senior debuts with the club's youth teams, playing in the sixth-tier Vitonen and the fourth-tier Kolmonen.

== Club career ==
During the 2023 season, Kangasniemi made six appearances with the club's academy squad SJK II, playing in Finnish second-tier Ykkönen. He also made one appearance in 2023 Finnish Cup for SJK II. On 25 September 2023, his deal with SJK academy was extended.

On 31 January 2024, Kangasniemi moved to Italy and signed a permanent contract with Inter Milan for an undisclosed fee. He was registered as a youth player in Inter Milan U17 squad.

On 26 August 2025, Kangasniemi returned to Finland and signed with Veikkausliiga club Inter Turku on a deal until the end of 2028. On 11 April 2026, he scored his first league goal, a winning goal on a stoppage time in a 2–1 home win over Ilves.

On 26 August 2026, he joined Leicester City on a five-year contract, for a €2.5 million fee, making it the record transfer fee of Veikkausliiga.

== International career ==
Kangasniemi is a regular Finnish youth international, and has represented his country at under-16, under-17 and under-18 level.

== Personal life ==
His father Tapio is a Finnish volleyball player who has represented the Finland men's national volleyball team.

== Career statistics ==
As of 25 August 2026

Appearances and goals by club, season and competition
Club	Season	League			National cup (Note: Includes Finnish Cup)		League cup (Note: Includes Finnish League Cup)		Continental		Total	
Club	Season	Division	Apps	Goals	Apps	Goals	Apps	Goals	Apps	Goals	Apps	Goals
SJK Akatemia III	2022	Vitonen	5	1	–		–		–		5	1
SJK Akatemia II	2022	Kolmonen	1	0	–		–		–		1	0
SJK Akatemia II	2023	Kolmonen	11	0	–		–		–		11	0
SJK Akatemia II	Total		12	0	0	0	0	0	0	0	12	0
SJK Akatemia	2023	Ykkönen	6	0	1	0	–		–		7	0
Inter Turku II	2025	Ykkönen	4	0	–		–		–		4	0
Inter Turku	2025	Veikkausliiga	2	0	–		–		–		2	0
Inter Turku	2026	Veikkausliiga	14	1	3	1	7	2	6 (Note: Appearances in UEFA Conference League)	0	30	4
Inter Turku	Total		16	1	3	1	7	2	6	0	32	4
Leicester City	2026–27	League One	0	0	0	0	–		–		0	0
Career total			43	2	4	1	7	2	6	0	60	5
