= Tommy Watson (footballer, born 2006) =

English footballer (born 2006)

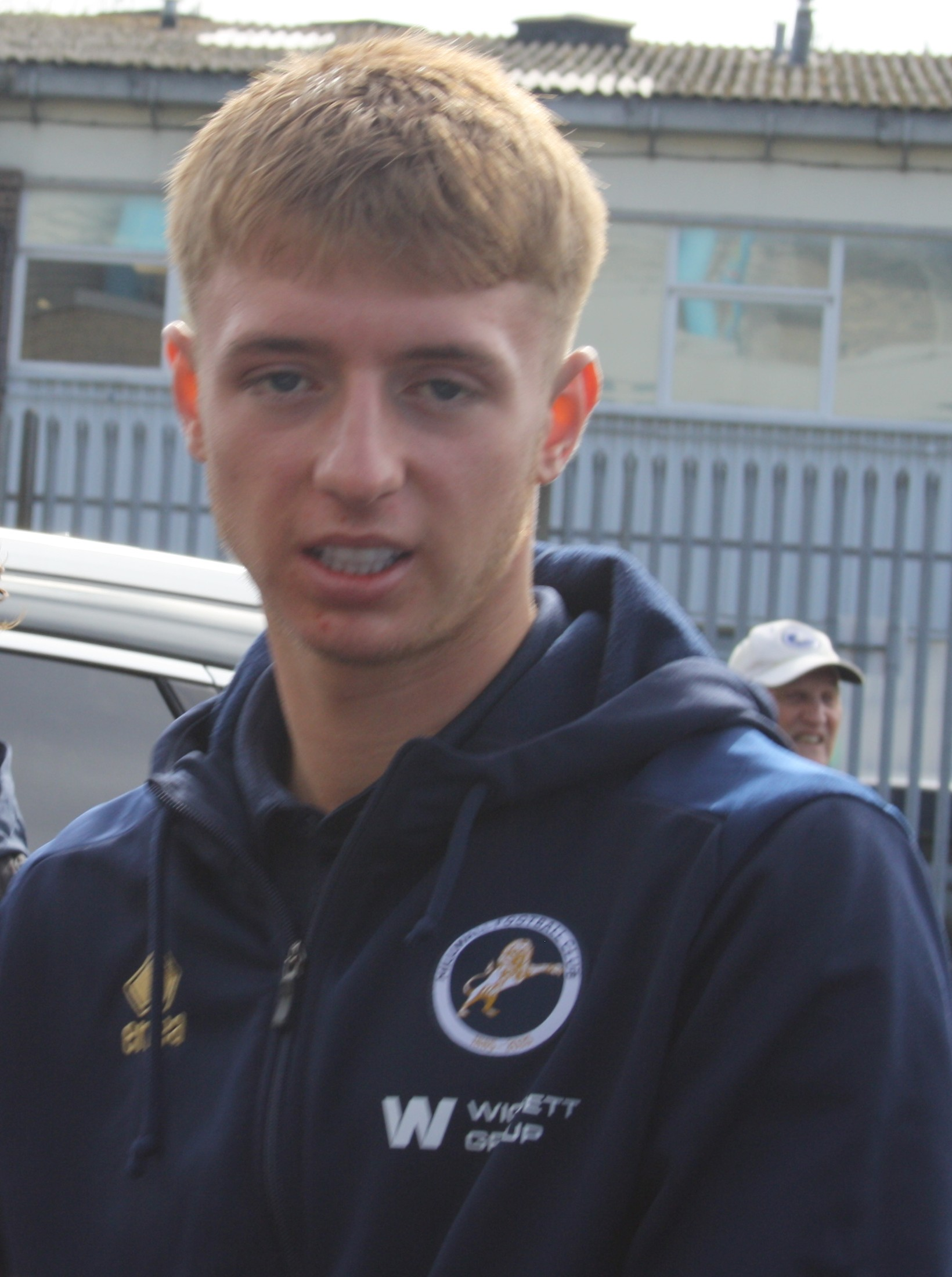
- Watson in 2026

Personal information
- Full name: Thomas Watson
- Date of birth: 8 April 2006 (age 20)
- Place of birth: Horden, England
- Height: 1.90 m (6 ft 3 in)
- Position: Left winger

Team information
- Current team: Leicester City (on loan from Brighton & Hove Albion)
- Number: 23

Youth career
- 2015–2023: Sunderland

Senior career*
Years	Team	Apps	(Gls)
2023–2025	Sunderland	22	(2)
2025–	Brighton & Hove Albion	6	(0)
2026	→ Millwall (loan)	12	(0)
2026–	→ Leicester City (loan)	7	(0)

International career^{‡}
2023	England U17	5	(1)
2023	England U18	2	(0)
2025	England U19	4	(2)
2026–	England U20	1	(2)
2025–	England U21	2	(0)
- * Club domestic league appearances and goals as of 19 September 2026 ‡ National team caps and goals as of 16:15, 27 March 2026 (UTC)

Thomas Watson (born 8 April 2006) is an English professional footballer who plays as a left winger for EFL League One club Leicester City, on loan from Premier League club Brighton & Hove Albion.

== Club career ==
=== Sunderland ===
Born in Horden, Watson first joined the Sunderland academy at the Under-9 level.

On 18 April 2023, Watson made his professional debut for Sunderland, appearing as a substitute in the EFL Championship against Huddersfield Town. Despite a back injury hampering his ability to feature at the start of the 2023–24 season, Watson signed a new three-year contract with Sunderland in September 2023.

On 7 December 2024, Watson scored the first league goals of his professional career in a 2–1 EFL Championship win for Sunderland against Stoke City.

On 1 April 2025, Watson was announced as a signing for Premier League club Brighton & Hove Albion for a £10m fee, officially joining the club at the start of the forthcoming transfer window. A month later, on 24 May, he came off the bench and scored a stoppage-time winner to complete a 2–1 comeback win over Sheffield United in the Championship play-off final, securing Sunderland's return to the Premier League for the first time since 2017.

=== Brighton & Hove Albion ===
On 1 June 2025, Watson joined Brighton & Hove Albion, signing a contract until June 2029. He scored on his debut, coming off the bench to add Brighton's sixth of the evening in their 6–0 away win over Oxford United in the EFL Cup.

==== Millwall (loan) ====
On 1 February 2026, Watson joined EFL Championship club Millwall on loan until end of 2025-26 season.

==== Leicester City (loan) ====
On 1 August 2026, Watson joined EFL League One club Leicester City on loan until the end of the 2026-27 season.

== International career ==
Watson made his England U17 debut in January 2023. That same month he scored his first England U17 goal in a 6–0 win over Germany U17.

Watson made his England U18 debut during a 1–1 draw with Belgium in Marbella on 11 October 2023.

Watson was included in the England U19 squad for the 2025 UEFA European Under-19 Championship. He made a goalscoring debut for that age group during a 3–1 warm-up win over Iceland at St George's Park National Football Centre on 6 June 2025. Watson also scored a goal in their opening game of the tournament against Norway.

In September 2025, Watson made his debut for England U21 as a substitute in their opening qualifying match against Kazakhstan.

== Style of play ==
Watson is noted for his pace and directness.

== Career statistics ==
As of match played 10 November 2026

Appearances and goals by club, season and competition
Club	Season	League			FA Cup		EFL Cup		Other		Total	
Club	Season	Division	Apps	Goals	Apps	Goals	Apps	Goals	Apps	Goals	Apps	Goals
Sunderland	2022–23	Championship	1	0	0	0	0	0	—		1	0
Sunderland	2023–24	Championship	1	0	0	0	0	0	—		1	0
Sunderland	2024–25	Championship	20	2	0	0	1	0	1 (Note: Appearance in EFL Championship play-offs)	1	22	3
Sunderland	Total		22	2	0	0	1	0	1	1	24	3
Brighton & Hove Albion	2025–26	Premier League	6	0	1	0	3	1	—		10	1
Millwall (loan)	2025–26	Championship	12	0	—		—		0	0	12	0
Leicester City (loan)	2026–27	League One	7	0	1	1	2	0	3 (Note: Appearances in EFL Trophy)	2	13	3
Career total			47	2	2	1	6	1	4	3	59	7

== Honours ==
Sunderland

- EFL Championship play-offs: 2025
