= Sammy Braybrooke =

English footballer (born 2004)

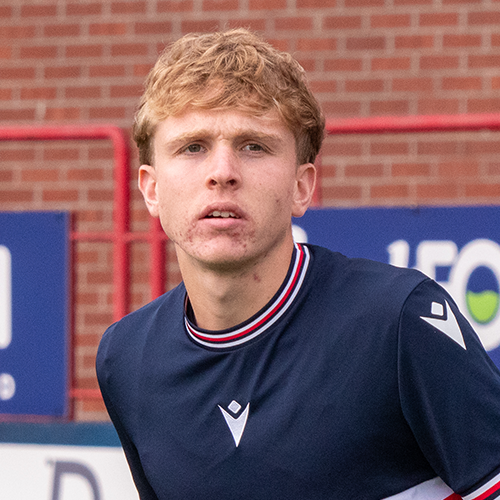
- Braybrooke in 2024

Personal information
- Full name: Samuel Charles Braybrooke
- Date of birth: 12 March 2004 (age 22)
- Place of birth: Leicester, England
- Height: 1.78 m (5 ft 10 in)
- Position: Midfielder

Team information
- Current team: Leicester City
- Number: 36

Youth career
- –2022: Leicester City

Senior career*
Years	Team	Apps	(Gls)
2022–	Leicester City	13	(1)
2024–2025	→ Dundee (loan)	7	(0)
2025–2026	→ Newport County (loan)	17	(2)
2026	→ Chesterfield (loan)	21	(0)

International career^{‡}
2021–2022	England U18	10	(0)
2022	England U19	3	(0)
2024	England U20	5	(0)
- * Club domestic league appearances and goals as of 23:23, 31 October 2026 (UTC) ‡ National team caps and goals as of 22:30, 15 November 2024 (UTC)

Samuel Charles Braybrooke (/ˈsæmjʊəl ʃɑːlz ˈbreɪbrʊk/; born 12 March 2004) is an English professional footballer who plays as a midfielder for EFL League One club Leicester City. He has previously played on loan for Dundee, Newport County, and Chesterfield.

== Early and personal life ==
From Wigston, his father is a coach in nearby Oadby for the Oadby Owls. It was at the Owls where Braybrooke was spotted by Leicester scout Bill Ward playing at the age of six. After this he joined the Leicester Academy. He attended Wigston Academy.

== Club career ==
=== Leicester City ===
Braybrooke was revealed to have signed a new professional contract with Leicester City in February 2022, running into 2024. Braybrooke was first named as part of the Leicester City match day squads as a substitute for Premier League matches in October 2022. At the time he was England under-19 captain and had been appearing regularly for Leicester City's under-23 team, as well as appearing on the substitutes bench in the UEFA Europa League. Prior to that he had also captained England under-18s. Leicester manager Brendan Rodgers has described him as "an outstanding player". Braybrooke has stated that training regularly with the first team and learning from players such as James Maddison, Youri Tielemans, and Wilfred Ndidi has allowed him to develop his skills.

Braybrooke made his professional debut on 8 November 2022 in the EFL Cup against Newport County. On 1 February 2023, he announced that he had suffered an anterior cruciate ligament injury and "will be out for a long period of time".

==== Dundee (loan) ====
On 28 August 2024, Braybrooke joined Scottish Premiership side Dundee on a season-long loan deal. Braybrooke made his first Dundee and senior start on three days later at home in a 2–2 draw with St Mirren in the league. On 13 January 2025, Braybrooke was recalled by Leicester and left Dundee. Upon his return, new Leicester manager Ruud van Nistelrooy confirmed that Braybrooke would remain with the first team for the rest of the season.

==== Newport County (loan) ====
On 1 September 2025, Braybrooke joined Newport County on loan until January 2026. He made his debut for the club five days later, starting in a 3–2 home defeat to Bristol Rovers in the league. Braybrooke scored his first goal for Newport on 20 December 2025 in the 4-1 EFL League Two defeat to Colchester United with a long range shot from inside the Newport half. The goal was selected as the EFL League Two Goal of the Month for December 2025.

==== Chesterfield (loan) ====
On 4 January 2026, Braybrooke joined EFL League Two club Chesterfield on loan for the remainder of the 2025–26 season. Having carried over his impressive form into his new loan spell, he was named in the EFL League Two Team of the Season in April 2026.

== International career ==
Braybrooke has been captain of the England national under-18 football team. In September 2022, he played for the first time for the England U19 team, against Montenegro U19. In January 2023, Braybrooke briefly went viral in Mexico when Premier League documentation erroneously stated that he was eligible to play for the Mexico national football team, before the mistake was rectified.

On 7 June 2024, Braybrooke made his England U20 debut during a 2–1 win over Sweden at Stadion ŠRC Sesvete.

== Career statistics ==
As of match played 31 October 2026

Appearances and goals by club, season and competition
Club	Season	League			National cup (Note: Includes FA Cup, Scottish Cup)		League cup (Note: Includes EFL Cup, Scottish League Cup)		Other		Total	
Club	Season	Division	Apps	Goals	Apps	Goals	Apps	Goals	Apps	Goals	Apps	Goals
Leicester City U21	2022–23	—			—		—		2 (Note: Appearances in EFL Trophy)	0	2	0
Leicester City U21	2023–24	—			—		—		0	0	0	0
Leicester City U21	2024–25	—			—		—		1	0	1	0
Leicester City U21	Total		—		—		—		3	0	3	0
Leicester City	2022–23	Premier League	0	0	0	0	1	0	—		1	0
Leicester City	2023–24	EFL Championship	0	0	0	0	0	0	—		0	0
Leicester City	2026–27	EFL League One	13	1	0	0	2	0	2	0	17	1
Leicester City	Total		13	1	0	0	3	0	2	0	18	1
Dundee (loan)	2024–25	Scottish Premiership	7	0	0	0	1	0	—		8	0
Newport County (loan)	2025–26	EFL League Two	17	2	2	0	0	0	3	0	22	2
Chesterfield (loan)	2025–26	EFL League Two	21	0	0	0	0	0	2 (Note: Appearances in EFL League Two play-offs)	0	23	0
Career total			58	3	2	0	4	0	10	0	74	3

== Honours ==
Individual

- EFL League Two Team of the Season: 2025–26
- PFA Team of the Year: 2025–26 League Two
