= EFL Awards =

Men's English Football League awards in England

- Country: England
- Presented by: English Football League
- First award: 2006
- Website: https://www.efl.com/-more/efl-awards/

The EFL Awards is an annual awards ceremony commemorating association football players, clubs and associated individuals involved in the three divisions of the English Football League (EFL).

The event was established in 2006 and is usually held at the Grosvenor House Hotel, London, in March or April of each year, towards the end of the Football League season.

== 2006 Awards ==
Date: 5 March 2006
Venue: Grosvenor House Hotel, London

| Award | Winner |
|---|---|
| Championship Player of the Year | Phil Jagielka (Sheffield United) |
| League One Player of the Year | Lee Trundle (Swansea City) |
| League Two Player of the Year | Karl Hawley (Carlisle United) |
| The Football League Young Player of the Year | David Nugent (Preston North End) |
| Championship Apprentice Award | Lewin Nyatanga (Derby County) |
| League One Apprentice Award | Scott Golbourne (Bristol City) |
| League Two Apprentice Award | Ikechi Anya (Wycombe Wanderers) |
| Goal of the Year | Stefan Oakes (Notts County vs Yeovil Town) |
| Most Admired Football League Club | Crewe Alexandra |
| Community Club of the Year | Brentford |
| Fan of the Year | Jeff Hall (Chesterfield) |
| Best Club Sponsorship | Norwich City |
| Best Club Marketing Campaign | Preston North End |
| Best Kit Design | Leyton Orient |
| Programme of the Year | Crystal Palace |
| Best Club Website | Nottingham Forest |
| Contribution to Football Award | Gerry Murphy (Huddersfield Town) |
| Best Ground | Hull City (KC Stadium) |
| Good Sport Award | Lee Bullen (Sheffield Wednesday) |

== 2007 Awards ==
Date: 4 March 2007
Venue: Grosvenor House Hotel, London

| Award | Winner |
|---|---|
| Championship Player of the Year | Jason Koumas (West Bromwich Albion) |
| League One Player of the Year | Billy Sharp (Scunthorpe United) |
| League Two Player of the Year | Izale McLeod (Milton Keynes Dons) |
| The Football League Young Player of the Year | Gareth Bale (Southampton) |
| Championship Apprentice Award | Chris Gunter (Cardiff City) |
| League One Apprentice Award | Joe Skarz (Huddersfield Town) |
| League Two Apprentice Award | Joe Thompson (Rochdale) |
| Goal of the Year | Joe Ledley (Cardiff City vs Barnsley) |
| Community Club of the Year | Brighton & Hove Albion |
| Fan of the Year | Stan McGowen (Bury) |
| Best Club Sponsorship | Brentford |
| Best Club Marketing Campaign | Norwich City |
| Best Kit Design | Burnley |
| Best Community Initiative | Norwich City |
| Programme of the Year | Colchester United |
| Best Use of New Media | Cardiff City |
| Contribution to Football Award | Jack Taylor |
| Best Ground | Sunderland (Stadium of Light) |
| Good Sport Award | Chris Doig (Northampton Town) |

== 2008 Awards ==
Date: 2 March 2008
Venue: Grosvenor House Hotel, London

| Award | Winner |
|---|---|
| Championship Player of the Year | Kevin Phillips (West Bromwich Albion) |
| League One Player of the Year | Jermaine Beckford (Leeds United) |
| League Two Player of the Year | Keith Andrews (Milton Keynes Dons) |
| The Football League Young Player of the Year | Michael Kightly (Wolverhampton Wanderers) |
| Championship Apprentice Award | Mark Beevers (Sheffield Wednesday) |
| League One Apprentice Award | Daniel Broadbent (Huddersfield Town) |
| League Two Apprentice Award | Ryan Bennett (Grimsby Town) |
| Goal of the Year | Jermaine Beckford (Scunthorpe United vs Rotherham United) |
| Community Club of the Year | Watford |
| Fan of the Year | Paul Smarah (Brighton & Hove Albion) |
| Best Fan Marketing Campaign | Bradford City |
| Championship Best Community Initiative | Charlton Athletic |
| League One Best Community Initiative | Brighton & Hove Albion |
| League Two Best Community Initiative | Notts County |
| Programme of the Year | Bristol City |
| Championship Family Club of the Year | Norwich City |
| League One Family Club of the Year | Huddersfield Town |
| League Two Family Club of the Year | Wycombe Wanderers |
| Contribution to Football Award | Jimmy Armfield |

== 2009 Awards ==
Date: 29 March 2009
Venue: Grosvenor House Hotel, London

| Award | Winner |
|---|---|
| Championship Player of the Year | Sylvan Ebanks-Blake (Wolverhampton Wanderers) |
| League One Player of the Year | Matt Fryatt (Leicester City) |
| League Two Player of the Year | Grant Holt (Shrewsbury Town) |
| The Football League Young Player of the Year | Fabian Delph (Leeds United) |
| Championship Apprentice Award | Sean Scannell (Crystal Palace) |
| League One Apprentice Award | Tom Aldred (Carlisle United) |
| League Two Apprentice Award | Matt Phillips (Wycombe Wanderers) |
| Goal of the Year | Sylvan Ebanks-Blake (Wolverhampton Wanderers vs Charlton Athletic) |
| PFA Player in the Community | Graeme Murty (Reading) |
| Championship Community Club of the Year | Charlton Athletic |
| League One Community Club of the Year | Leyton Orient |
| League Two Community Club of the Year | Brentford |
| Fan of the Year | Warner Duff (Ipswich Town) |
| Best Fan Marketing Campaign | Preston North End |
| Programme of the Year | Burnley |
| Championship Family Club of the Year | Wolverhampton Wanderers |
| League One Family Club of the Year | Southend United |
| League Two Family Club of the Year | Shrewsbury Town |
| Best Digital Communication | Milton Keynes Dons |
| Contribution to Football Award | Jimmy Hill OBE |

== 2010 Awards ==
Date: 14 March 2010
Venue: Grosvenor House Hotel, London

| Award | Winner |
|---|---|
| Championship Player of the Year | Kevin Nolan (Newcastle United) |
| League One Player of the Year | Jermaine Beckford (Leeds United) |
| League Two Player of the Year | Craig Dawson (Rochdale) |
| The Football League Young Player of the Year | Nathaniel Clyne (Crystal Palace) |
| Championship Apprentice Award | Adam Matthews (Cardiff City) |
| League One Apprentice Award | Tom Adeyemi (Norwich City) |
| League Two Apprentice Award | Kyle Haynes (Cheltenham Town) |
| Goal of the Year | Nicky Maynard (Queens Park Rangers vs Bristol City) |
| PFA Player in the Community | Zesh Rehman (Bradford City) |
| Championship Community Club of the Year | Southend United and Watford (joint winners) |
| Fan of the Year | Herbert Taylor (Southampton) |
| Best Fan Marketing Campaign | Nottingham Forest |
| Championship Best Matchday Programme | Scunthorpe United |
| League One Best Matchday Programme | Huddersfield Town |
| League Two Best Matchday Programme | Rotherham United |
| Championship Family Club of the Year | Reading |
| League One Family Club of the Year | Huddersfield Town |
| League Two Family Club of the Year | Shrewsbury Town |
| Best Digital Communication | Derby County |
| Outstanding Contribution to League Football | Gordon Taylor OBE |

== 2011 Awards ==
Date: 20 March 2011
Venue: The Brewery, London

| Award | Winner |
|---|---|
| Championship Player of the Year | Adel Taarabt (Queens Park Rangers) |
| League One Player of the Year | Craig Mackail-Smith (Peterborough United) |
| League Two Player of the Year | Ryan Lowe (Bury) |
| The Football League Young Player of the Year | Connor Wickham (Ipswich Town) |
| Championship Apprentice Award | Connor Wickham (Ipswich Town) |
| League One Apprentice Award | Dale Jennings (Tranmere Rovers) |
| League Two Apprentice Award | Kadeem Harris (Wycombe Wanderers) |
| Goal of the Year | Dean Furman (Oldham Athletic vs Notts County) |
| PFA Player in the Community | Darren Moore (Burton Albion) |
| Community Club of the Year | Southend United |
| Fan of the Year | Kevin Monks (Coventry City) |
| Best Fan Marketing Campaign | Reading |
| Best Matchday Programme | Middlesbrough |
| Family Club of the Year | Cardiff City |
| Outstanding Team Performance | Stevenage (3-1 vs Newcastle United in FA Cup Third Round) |
| Unsung Hero | Jim Thompson (Burnley) |
| Outstanding Contribution to League Football | Dario Gradi MBE |

== 2012 Awards ==
Date: 11 March 2012
Venue: The Brewery, London

| Award | Winner |
|---|---|
| Championship Player of the Year | Rickie Lambert (Southampton) |
| League One Player of the Year | Jordan Rhodes (Huddersfield Town) |
| League Two Player of the Year | Matt Ritchie (Swindon Town) |
| The Football League Young Player of the Year | Wilfried Zaha (Crystal Palace) |
| Championship Apprentice Award | Gaël Bigirimana (Coventry City) |
| League One Apprentice Award | Jordan Cousins (Charlton Athletic) |
| League Two Apprentice Award | Nick Powell (Crewe Alexandra) |
| Goal of the Year | Peter Whittingham (Cardiff City vs Barnsley) |
| PFA Player in the Community | Tamika Mkandawire (Millwall) |
| Community Club of the Year (Overall & North-East) | Rotherham United |
| Community Club of the Year (North-West) | Bury |
| Community Club of the Year (Midlands) | Notts County |
| Community Club of the Year (South-East) | Milton Keynes Dons |
| Community Club of the Year (South-West) | Portsmouth |
| Fan of the Year (Overall & League Two) | Sue Pollard (Plymouth Argyle) |
| Fan of the Year (Championship) | Paddy Cronesberry (Middlesbrough) |
| Fan of the Year (League One) | Lynn Noon (Preston North End) |
| Best Fan Marketing Campaign | Hartlepool United |
| Best Matchday Programme (Championship) | Burnley |
| Best Matchday Programme (League One) | Notts County |
| Best Matchday Programme (League Two) | Swindon Town |
| Family Club of the Year (Championship) | Portsmouth |
| Family Club of the Year (League One) | Huddersfield Town |
| Family Club of the Year (League Two) | Swindon Town |
| Outstanding Managerial Performance | Gus Poyet (Brighton & Hove Albion) |
| Unsung Hero | Paul Bradley (Preston North End) |
| Outstanding Contribution to League Football | Graham Turner |

== 2013 Awards ==
Date: 24 March 2013
Venue: The Brewery, London

| Award | Winner |
|---|---|
| Championship Player of the Year | Matěj Vydra (Watford) |
| League One Player of the Year | Matt Ritchie (AFC Bournemouth) |
| League Two Player of the Year | Tom Pope (Port Vale) |
| The Football League Young Player of the Year | Tom Ince (Blackpool) |
| Championship Apprentice Award | Dimitar Evtimov (Nottingham Forest) |
| League One Apprentice Award | Luke James (Hartlepool United) |
| League Two Apprentice Award | George Sykes (Barnet) |
| Goal of the Year | Simon Cox (Nottingham Forest vs Birmingham City) |
| PFA Player in the Community | Iñigo Calderón (Brighton & Hove Albion) |
| Community Club of the Year (Overall & South-East) | Charlton Athletic |
| Community Club of the Year (North-West) | Tranmere Rovers |
| Community Club of the Year (Midlands) | Derby County |
| Community Club of the Year (North-East) | Huddersfield Town |
| Community Club of the Year (South-West) | Cardiff City |
| Fan of the Year (Overall) | Neil Le Milliere (Exeter City) |
| Fan of the Year (Championship) | Nick Webster (Derby County) |
| Fan of the Year (League One) | Pat Raybould (Coventry City) |
| Family Club of the Year (Championship) | Cardiff City |
| Family Club of the Year (League One) | AFC Bournemouth |
| Family Club of the Year (League Two) | Plymouth Argyle |
| Outstanding Managerial Performance | Phil Parkinson (Bradford City) |
| Unsung Hero | Billy Neil (Millwall) |
| Outstanding Contribution to League Football | Peter Shilton OBE |
| Capital One Credit to the Game | Graham Alexander |

== 2014 Awards ==
Date: 16 March 2014
Venue: The Brewery, London

| Award | Winner |
|---|---|
| Championship Player of the Year | Danny Ings (Burnley) |
| League One Player of the Year | Adam Forshaw (Brentford) |
| League Two Player of the Year | Gary Roberts (Chesterfield) |
| The Football League Young Player of the Year | Will Hughes (Derby County) |
| Championship Apprentice Award | Mason Bennett (Derby County) |
| League One Apprentice Award | Brendan Galloway (Milton Keynes Dons) |
| League Two Apprentice Award | Bradley Walker (Hartlepool United) |
| Goal of the Year | Franck Moussa (Coventry City vs Leyton Orient) |
| PFA Player in the Community | Réda Johnson (Sheffield Wednesday) |
| Community Club of the Year (Overall & South-East) | Brentford |
| Community Club of the Year (North-West) | Morecambe |
| Community Club of the Year (Midlands) | Derby County |
| Community Club of the Year (North-East) | Doncaster Rovers |
| Community Club of the Year (South-West) | Portsmouth |
| Fan of the Year (Overall & Championship) | Phil Beeton (Leeds United) |
| Fan of the Year (League One) | Brett Price (Sheffield United) |
| Fan of the Year (League Two) | John Chapman (Dagenham & Redbridge) |
| Family Club of the Year (Championship) | Middlesbrough |
| Family Club of the Year (League One) | Wolverhampton Wanderers |
| Family Club of the Year (League Two) | Plymouth Argyle |
| Sir Tom Finney Award | Steve Fletcher |
| Outstanding Managerial Performance | Gary Johnson (Yeovil Town) |
| Unsung Hero | Frank Banks (Southend United) |
| Outstanding Contribution to League Football | John Bowler (Crewe Alexandra) |

== 2015 Awards ==
Date: 19 April 2015
Venue: The Brewery, London

To celebrate the 10th anniversary of the awards, a Team of the Decade was named highlighting the best eleven players and manager of the previous ten years.

| Award | Winner |
|---|---|
| Championship Player of the Year | Patrick Bamford (Middlesbrough) |
| League One Player of the Year | Joe Garner (Preston North End) |
| League Two Player of the Year | Danny Mayor (Bury) |
| The Football League Young Player of the Year | Dele Alli (Milton Keynes Dons) |
| Championship Apprentice Award | Lewis Cook (Leeds United) |
| League One Apprentice Award | George Cooper (Crewe Alexandra) |
| League Two Apprentice Award | Conor Chaplin (Portsmouth) |
| Goal of the Year | Joe Garner (Preston North End) |
| PFA Player in the Community | Danny Shittu (Millwall) |
| Tokio Marine Kiln Club Hero Award | Brian Murphy (Birmingham City) |
| Community Club of the Year | Derby County Community Trust |
| Fan of the Year | Sarah Watts (Brighton & Hove Albion) |
| Family Club of the Year | Colchester United |
| Sir Tom Finney Award | Kevin Phillips |
| Contribution to League football | Major Frank Buckley |

The Football League Team of the Decade
(Denmark) Kasper Schmeichel
(Spain) Angel Rangel
(Wales) Gareth Bale
(Jamaica) Wes Morgan
(Wales) Ashley Williams
(Republic of Ireland) Wes Hoolahan
(England) Adam Lallana
(England) Peter Whittingham
(England) Glenn Murray
(England) Rickie Lambert
(Scotland) Jordan Rhodes

Manager: (England) Eddie Howe

== 2016 Awards ==
Date: 17 April 2016
Venue: Manchester Central Convention Complex, Manchester

| Award | Winner |
|---|---|
| Championship Player of the Year | Andre Gray (Burnley) |
| League One Player of the Year | Bradley Dack (Gillingham) |
| League Two Player of the Year | Kemar Roofe (Oxford United) |
| The Football League Young Player of the Year | Lewis Cook (Leeds United) |
| Championship Apprentice Award | Ademola Lookman (Charlton Athletic) |
| League One Apprentice Award | James Bree (Barnsley) |
| League Two Apprentice Award | Ben Godfrey (York City) |
| Goal of the Year | Marco Matias (Sheffield Wednesday) |
| PFA Player in the Community | George Friend (Middlesbrough) |
| Community Club of the Year | Charlton Athletic |
| Fan of the Year | Oskar Pycroft (Bristol City) |
| Family Club of the Year | Fulham |
| Sir Tom Finney Award | Kevin Davies |
| Contribution to League football | Andy Williamson |

The Football League Team of the Season
| (England) Adam Smith | Northampton Town |
| (Spain) Bruno | Brighton & Hove Albion |
| (Wales) Craig Morgan | Wigan Athletic |
| (Spain) Daniel Ayala | Middlesbrough |
| (England) George Friend | Middlesbrough |
| (Republic of Ireland) Alan Judge | Brentford |
| (England) Bradley Dack | Gillingham |
| (England) Joey Barton | Burnley |
| (Jamaica) Kemar Roofe | Leeds United |
| (England) Nicky Ajose | Swindon Town |
| (Jamaica) Andre Gray | Burnley |

Manager: (England) Chris Wilder (Northampton Town)

== 2017 Awards ==
Date: 9 April 2017
Venue: London Hilton on Park Lane, London

| Award | Winner |
|---|---|
| Championship Player of the Year | Anthony Knockaert (Brighton & Hove Albion) |
| League One Player of the Year | Billy Sharp (Sheffield United) |
| League Two Player of the Year | John Marquis (Doncaster Rovers) |
| EFL Young Player of the Year | Ollie Watkins (Exeter City) |
| Championship Apprentice Award | Ben Brereton (Nottingham Forest) |
| League One Apprentice Award | Lewis Butroid (Scunthorpe United) |
| League Two Apprentice Award | Myles Judd (Leyton Orient) |
| Goal of the Year | Steve Sidwell (Brighton & Hove Albion) |
| PFA Player in the Community | Andy Butler (Doncaster Rovers) |
| Community Club of the Year | Portsmouth |
| Fan of the Year | Paul Mayfield (Doncaster Rovers) |
| Family Club of the Year | Millwall |
| Sir Tom Finney Award | Kevin O’Connor |
| Contribution to League football | Barry Fry |

EFL Team of the Season
| (England) David Stockdale | Brighton & Hove Albion |
| (Republic of Ireland) Enda Stevens | Portsmouth |
| (Sweden) Pontus Jansson | Leeds United |
| (England) Sonny Bradley | Plymouth Argyle |
| (Republic of Ireland) Conor McLaughlin | Fleetwood Town |
| (England) Josh Morris | Scunthorpe United |
| (Australia) Aaron Mooy | Huddersfield Town |
| (France) Anthony Knockaert | Brighton & Hove Albion |
| (New Zealand) Chris Wood | Leeds United |
| (England) Billy Sharp | Sheffield United |
| (England) Dwight Gayle | Newcastle United |

Manager: (Scotland) Darren Ferguson (Doncaster Rovers)

== 2018 Awards ==
Date: 15 April 2018
Venue: London Hilton on Park Lane, London

| Award | Winner |
|---|---|
| Championship Player of the Year | Ryan Sessegnon (Fulham) |
| League One Player of the Year | Bradley Dack (Blackburn Rovers) |
| League Two Player of the Year | Billy Kee (Accrington Stanley) |
| EFL Young Player of the Year | Ryan Sessegnon (Fulham) |
| Championship Apprentice Award | Ryan Sessegnon (Fulham) |
| League One Apprentice Award | Anthony Hartigan (AFC Wimbledon) |
| League Two Apprentice Award | Ben Wilmot (Stevenage) |
| Goal of the Year | Olly Lee (Luton Town) |
| PFA Player in the Community | Joe Bryan (Bristol City) |
| Community Club of the Year | Derby County |
| Fan of the Year | Mustafa El-Bayati (Northampton Town) |
| Family Club of the Year | Blackburn Rovers |
| Sir Tom Finney Award | Rickie Lambert |
| Contribution to League football | John Motson |

EFL Team of the Season
| (England) John Ruddy | Wolverhampton Wanderers |
| (England) Ryan Sessegnon | Fulham |
| (Scotland) Charlie Mulgrew | Blackburn Rovers |
| (England) Conor Coady | Wolverhampton Wanderers |
| (England) Nathan Byrne | Wigan Athletic |
| (England) Bradley Dack | Blackburn Rovers |
| (Portugal) Rúben Neves | Wolverhampton Wanderers |
| (England) James Maddison | Norwich City |
| (Northern Ireland) Billy Kee | Accrington Stanley |
| (Jamaica) Bobby Reid | Bristol City |
| (England) Adebayo Akinfenwa | Wycombe Wanderers |

Manager: (England) John Coleman (Accrington Stanley)

== 2019 Awards ==
Date: 7 April 2019
Venue: Grosvenor House Hotel, London

| Award | Winner |
|---|---|
| Championship Player of the Year | Teemu Pukki (Norwich City) |
| League One Player of the Year | James Collins (Luton Town) |
| League Two Player of the Year | James Norwood (Tranmere Rovers) |
| EFL Young Player of the Year | Max Aarons (Norwich City) |
| Apprentice Award | Max Bird (Derby County) |
| Goal of the Year | Rúben Neves (Wolverhampton Wanderers) |
| PFA Player in the Community | Will Vaulks (Rotherham United) |
| Community Club of the Year | Portsmouth |
| Fan of the Year | Roger Groves; Mike Davis (Shrewsbury Town) |
| Family Club of the Year | Doncaster Rovers |
| Sir Tom Finney Award | Joe Thompson |
| Contribution to League football | David Allison |

EFL Team of the Season
| (Wales) Adam Davies | Barnsley |
| (England) Max Aarons | Norwich City |
| (Barbados) Krystian Pearce | Mansfield Town |
| (Scotland) Liam Cooper | Leeds United |
| (England) James Justin | Luton Town |
| (England) Alex Mowatt | Barnsley |
| (Republic of Ireland) Jay O'Shea | Bury |
| (England) Jarrod Bowen | Hull City |
| (Finland) Teemu Pukki | Norwich City |
| (England) Billy Sharp | Sheffield United |
| (England) James Norwood | Tranmere Rovers |

Manager: (England) Chris Wilder (Sheffield United)

== 2020 Awards ==
The 2020 awards ceremony was cancelled due to the COVID-19 pandemic. The winners were announced on 27 August 2020. Due to the shortened season, no Team of the Season was named.

| Award | Winner |
|---|---|
| Championship Player of the Year | Ollie Watkins (Brentford) |
| League One Player of the Year | Ivan Toney (Peterborough United) |
| League Two Player of the Year | Eoin Doyle (Swindon Town) |
| EFL Young Player of the Year | Jude Bellingham (Birmingham City) |
| Apprentice Award | Jude Bellingham (Birmingham City) |
| Goal of the Year | Charles Vernam (Grimsby Town) |

== 2021 Awards ==
Date: 29 April 2021
Venue: Sky Sports (Note: Due to the COVID-19 pandemic, the ceremony took place without guests present.)

| Award | Winner |
|---|---|
| Championship Player of the Year | Emiliano Buendía (Norwich City) |
| League One Player of the Year | Jonson Clarke-Harris (Peterborough United) |
| League Two Player of the Year | Paul Mullin (Cambridge United) |
| EFL Young Player of the Year | Michael Olise (Reading) |
| Championship Apprentice Award | Will Trueman (Sheffield Wednesday) |
| League One Apprentice Award | Lewis Johnson (Milton Keynes Dons) |
| League Two Apprentice Award | Felix Miles (Cheltenham Town) |
| Goal of the Year | Lee Novak (Bradford City vs Grimsby Town) |
| PFA Player in the Community (Championship & Overall) | Will Vaulks (Cardiff City) |
| PFA Player in the Community (League One) | Alex Rodman (Bristol Rovers) |
| PFA Player in the Community (League Two) | Matty Dolan (Newport County) |
| Community Club of the Year (Overall & Midlands) | Port Vale |
| Community Club of the Year (North-East & Yorkshire) | Sunderland |
| Community Club of the Year (North West) | Blackburn Rovers |
| Community Club of the Year (South-West & Wales) | Bristol Rovers |
| Community Club of the Year (South East & East) | Portsmouth |
| Community Club of the Year (London) | Watford |
| Sir Tom Finney Award | James Coppinger (Doncaster Rovers) |
| Contribution to League football | John Rudge |
| Moment of the Season | Dean Lewington (Milton Keynes Dons) |

Football Manager EFL Teams of the Season
The following players were voted for by the EFL as the best players and managers in their respective leagues. This was the first year in which a Team of the Season was named for each individual league.

EFL Championship
| (Bosnia and Herzegovina) Asmir Begovic | AFC Bournemouth |
| (England) Max Aarons | Norwich City |
| (Scotland) Grant Hanley | Norwich City |
| (England) Sean Morrison | Cardiff City |
| (Morocco) Adam Masina | Watford |
| (Argentina) Emi Buendía | Norwich City |
| (France) Michael Olise | Reading |
| (England) Alex Mowatt | Barnsley |
| (Netherlands) Arnaut Danjuma | AFC Bournemouth |
| (England) Ivan Toney | Brentford |
| (Finland) Teemu Pukki | Norwich City |

Manager: (Germany) Daniel Farke (Norwich City)

EFL League One
| (England) Lee Burge | Sunderland |
| (England) Luke O'Nien | Sunderland |
| (England) Rob Atkinson | Oxford United |
| (England) Mark Beevers | Peterborough United |
| (Australia) Callum Elder | Hull City |
| (England) Joe Ward | Peterborough United |
| (England) Jorge Grant | Lincoln City |
| (England) George Honeyman | Hull City |
| (Republic of Ireland) Aiden McGeady | Sunderland |
| (England) Jonson Clarke-Harris | Peterborough United |
| (England) Charlie Wyke | Sunderland |

Manager: (Northern Ireland) Grant McCann (Hull City)

EFL League Two
| (Czech Republic) Václav Hladký | Salford City |
| (England) Kyle Knoyle | Cambridge United |
| (England) Will Boyle | Cheltenham Town |
| (England) Jordan Tunnicliffe | Crawley Town |
| (The Gambia) Ibou Touray | Salford City |
| (England) David Worrall | Port Vale |
| (Republic of Ireland) Wes Hoolahan | Cambridge United |
| (England) Antoni Sarcevic | Bolton Wanderers |
| (England) Chris Hussey | Cheltenham Town |
| (England) Matt Jay | Exeter City |
| (England) Paul Mullin | Cambridge United |

Manager: (Northern Ireland) Michael Duff (Cheltenham Town)

== 2022 Awards ==
Date: 24 April 2022
Venue: Grosvenor House Hotel, London

| Award | Winner |
|---|---|
| Championship Player of the Season | Aleksandar Mitrović (Fulham) |
| League One Player of the Season | Scott Twine (Milton Keynes Dons) |
| League Two Player of the Season | Kane Wilson (Forest Green Rovers) |
| Championship Young Player of the Season | Brennan Johnson (Nottingham Forest) |
| League One Young Player of the Season | Paddy Lane (Fleetwood Town) |
| League Two Young Player of the Season | Finn Azaz (Newport County) |
| Championship Apprentice Award | Ryan Howley (Coventry City) |
| League One Apprentice Award | Deji Elerewe (Charlton Athletic) |
| League Two Apprentice Award | Junior Tchamadeu (Colchester United) |
| 2022 Goal of the Season | Barry Bannan (Sheffield Wednesday vs MK Dons) |
| Community Club of the Year (North-East & Yorkshire) | Middlesbrough |
| Community Club of the Year (North West) | Blackpool |
| Community Club of the Year (Midlands) | Derby County |
| Community Club of the Year (London) | AFC Wimbledon |
| Community Club of the Year (South West and Wales) | Plymouth Argyle |
| Community Club of the Year (South East and East) | Milton Keynes Dons |
| Championship Community Project of the Season | Preston North End |
| League One Community Project of the Season | Burton Albion |
| League Two Community Project of the Season | Swindon Town |
| PFA Player in the Community (Championship) | Billy Mitchell (Millwall) |
| PFA Player in the Community (League One) | Ryan Inniss (Charlton Athletic) |
| PFA Player in the Community (League Two) | Omar Beckles (Leyton Orient) |
| Family Club of the Season | Ipswich Town |
| Diversity Award | Blackburn Rovers |
| Environmental Sustainability Award | Cambridge United |
| Supporter of the Season | Cath Dyer (Swansea City) |
| Sir Tom Finney Award | Jobi McAnuff |
| Contribution to League Football | Ben Robinson (Burton Albion) |

Football Manager EFL Teams of the Season
The following players were voted for by the EFL as the best players and managers in their respective leagues.

EFL Championship
| (England) Lee Nicholls | Huddersfield Town |
| (England) Tosin Adarabioyo | Fulham |
| (England) Lloyd Kelly | AFC Bournemouth |
| (England) Joe Worrall | Nottingham Forest |
| (England) Djed Spence | Nottingham Forest |
| (England) Ryan Yates | Nottingham Forest |
| (Denmark) Philip Billing | AFC Bournemouth |
| (United States) Antonee Robinson | Fulham |
| (Wales) Harry Wilson | Fulham |
| (England) Dominic Solanke | AFC Bournemouth |
| (Serbia) Aleksandar Mitrović | Fulham |

Manager: (Wales) Nathan Jones (Luton Town)

EFL League One
| (England) Michael Cooper | Plymouth Argyle |
| (England) Jack Whatmough | Wigan Athletic |
| (England) Michael Ihiekwe | Rotherham United |
| (England) Harry Darling | Milton Keynes Dons |
| (Republic of Ireland) James McClean | Wigan Athletic |
| (England) Daniel Barlaser | Rotherham United |
| (Scotland) Barry Bannan | Sheffield Wednesday |
| (Wales) Wes Burns | Ipswich Town |
| (England) Scott Twine | Milton Keynes Dons |
| (Scotland) Ross Stewart | Sunderland |
| (England) Michael Smith | Rotherham United |

Manager: (England) Leam Richardson (Wigan Athletic)

EFL League Two
| (Ghana) Joe Wollacott | Swindon Town |
| (England) Jon Guthrie | Northampton Town |
| (England) Peter Clarke | Tranmere Rovers |
| (England) Jordan Turnbull | Salford City |
| (England) Kane Wilson | Forest Green Rovers |
| (France) Timothée Dieng | Exeter City |
| (England) Finn Azaz | Newport County |
| (Scotland) Nicky Cadden | Forest Green Rovers |
| (England) Harry McKirdy | Swindon Town |
| (England) Dom Telford | Newport County |
| (England) Matty Stevens | Forest Green Rovers |

Manager: (England) Rob Edwards (Forest Green Rovers)

== 2023 Awards ==
Date: 23 April 2023

Venue: Grosvenor House Hotel, London

| Award | Winner |
|---|---|
| Championship Player of the Season | Chuba Akpom (Middlesbrough) |
| League One Player of the Season | Aaron Collins (Bristol Rovers) |
| League Two Player of the Season | Sam Hoskins (Northampton Town) |
| Championship Young Player of the Season | Alex Scott (Bristol City) |
| League One Young Player of the Season | Bali Mumba (Plymouth Argyle) |
| League Two Young Player of the Season | Junior Tchamadeu (Colchester United) |
| Championship Apprentice of the Season | Ashley Phillips (Blackburn Rovers) |
| League One Apprentice of the Season | Zach Mitchell (Charlton Athletic) |
| League Two Apprentice of the Season | Josh Tomlinson (Northampton Town) |
| 2023 Goal of the Season | Ismaïla Sarr (West Bromwich Albion vs Watford) |
| Player in the Community | Omar Beckles (Leyton Orient) |
| Community Club of the Season | Wigan Athletic |
| Community Project of the Season | Milton Keynes Dons |
| Fan Engagement Award | Bolton Wanderers |
| Diversity Award | Middlesbrough |
| Innovation Award | Norwich City |
| Green Club Award | Bristol City |
| Club Employee Award | John Clarke (Burton Albion) |
| Supporter of the Season | Les Miller (Luton Town) |
| Sir Tom Finney Award | Adebayo Akinfenwa |
| Contribution to League Football | Chris Kamara |

EFL Teams of the Season

The following players were voted for by the EFL as the best players and managers in their respective leagues.

EFL Championship
| (England) Ben Wilson | Coventry City |
| (Wales) Connor Roberts | Burnley |
| (Bosnia and Herzegovina) Anel Ahmedhodžić | Sheffield United |
| (Wales) Tom Lockyer | Luton Town |
| (Netherlands) Ian Maatsen | Burnley |
| (England) Alex Scott | Bristol City |
| (England) Josh Brownhill | Burnley |
| (England) Nathan Tella | Burnley |
| (Senegal) Iliman Ndiaye | Sheffield United |
| (England) Chuba Akpom | Middlesbrough |
| (Sweden) Viktor Gyökeres | Coventry City |

Manager: (Belgium) Vincent Kompany (Burnley)

EFL League One
| (England) Michael Cooper | Plymouth Argyle |
| (England) Bali Mumba | Plymouth Argyle |
| (England) Leif Davis | Ipswich Town |
| (Denmark) Mads Juel Andersen | Barnsley |
| (Cape Verde) Ricardo Santos | Bolton Wanderers |
| (Scotland) Barry Bannan | Sheffield Wednesday |
| (Wales) Aaron Collins | Bristol Rovers |
| (Jamaica) Jonson Clarke-Harris | Peterborough United |
| (England) Conor Chaplin | Ipswich Town |
| (England) Josh Windass | Sheffield Wednesday |
| (Republic of Ireland) Conor Hourihane | Derby County |

Manager: (England) Steven Schumacher (Plymouth Argyle)

EFL League Two
| (Chile) Lawrence Vigouroux | Leyton Orient |
| (England) Junior Tchamadeu | Colchester United |
| (The Gambia) Ibou Touray | Salford City |
| (England) Carl Piergianni | Stevenage |
| (Grenada) Omar Beckles | Leyton Orient |
| (Scotland) Elliot Watt | Salford City |
| (England) Owen Moxon | Carlisle United |
| (Tunisia) Idris El Mizouni | Leyton Orient |
| (England) Sam Hoskins | Northampton Town |
| (England) Andy Cook | Bradford City |
| (England) Mitch Pinnock | Northampton Town |

Manager: (England) Richie Wellens (Leyton Orient)

== 2024 Awards ==
Date: 14 April 2024

Venue: Grosvenor House Hotel, London

| Award | Winner |
|---|---|
| Championship Player of the Season | Crysencio Summerville (Leeds United) |
| League One Player of the Season | Harrison Burrows (Peterborough United) |
| League Two Player of the Season | Jodi Jones (Notts County) |
| Championship Young Player of the Season | Archie Gray (Leeds United) |
| League One Young Player of the Season | Ronnie Edwards (Peterborough United) |
| League Two Young Player of the Season | Rob Apter (Tranmere Rovers) |
| Championship Apprentice of the Season | Archie Gray (Leeds United) |
| League One Apprentice of the Season | Reuben Wyatt (Northampton Town) |
| League Two Apprentice of the Season | Callum Tripp (Milton Keynes Dons) |
| 2024 Goal of the Season | Wes Burns (Ipswich Town vs Coventry City) |
| Player in the Community | Will Vaulks (Sheffield Wednesday) |
| Community Club of the Season | Charlton Athletic |
| Community Project of the Season | Bristol City |
| Fan Engagement Award | Blackburn Rovers |
| Diversity Award | Huddersfield Town |
| Innovation Award | Norwich City |
| Green Club Award | Rotherham United |
| Club Employee Award | Lindsey Martin (Leyton Orient) |
| Supporter of the Season | Dave Heeley (West Bromwich Albion) |
| Sir Tom Finney Award | Luke Chambers |
| Contribution to League Football | Paul Stewart |

EFL Teams of the Season

The following players were voted for by the EFL as the best players and managers in their respective leagues.

EFL Championship
| (Denmark) Mads Hermansen | Leicester City |
| (England) Kyle Walker-Peters | Southampton |
| (Wales) Ethan Ampadu | Leeds United |
| (England) Jacob Greaves | Hull City |
| (England) Leif Davis | Ipswich Town |
| (England) Kiernan Dewsbury-Hall | Leicester City |
| (Brazil) Gabriel Sara | Norwich City |
| (England) Morgan Whittaker | Plymouth Argyle |
| (Republic of Ireland) Sammie Szmodics | Blackburn Rovers |
| (Netherlands) Crysencio Summerville | Leeds United |
| (France) Georginio Rutter | Leeds United |

Manager: (Northern Ireland) Kieran McKenna (Ipswich Town)

EFL League One
| (England) Will Norris | Portsmouth |
| (England) Josh Dacres-Cogley | Bolton Wanderers |
| (Republic of Ireland) Conor Shaughnessy | Portsmouth |
| (Republic of Ireland) Eiran Cashin | Derby County |
| (England) Harrison Burrows | Peterborough United |
| (Guatemala) Nathaniel Mendez-Laing | Derby County |
| (England) Marlon Pack | Portsmouth |
| (Wales) Josh Sheehan | Bolton Wanderers |
| (England) Ephron Mason-Clark | Peterborough United |
| (England) Alfie May | Charlton Athletic |
| (Northern Ireland) Jamie Reid | Stevenage |

Manager: (England) John Mousinho (Portsmouth)

EFL League Two
| (England) Arthur Okonkwo | Wrexham |
| (England) Fraser Horsfall | Stockport County |
| (England) Aden Flint | Mansfield Town |
| (England) Mickey Demetriou | Crewe Alexandra |
| (England) Bradley Halliday | Bradford City |
| (England) Louis Reed | Mansfield Town |
| (Malta) Jodi Jones | Notts County |
| (England) Elliot Lee | Wrexham |
| (England) Davis Keillor-Dunn | Mansfield Town |
| (England) Matt Smith | Salford City |
| (England) Macaulay Langstaff | Notts County |

Manager: (England) Nigel Clough (Mansfield Town)

== 2025 Awards ==
Date: 27 April 2025

Venue: Hilton Hotel, Park Lane, London

| Award | Winner |
|---|---|
| Championship Player of the Season | Gustavo Hamer (Sheffield United) |
| League One Player of the Season | Richard Kone (Wycombe Wanderers) |
| League Two Player of the Season | Michael Cheek (Bromley) |
| Championship Young Player of the Season | Jobe Bellingham (Sunderland) |
| League One Young Player of the Season | Richard Kone (Wycombe Wanderers) |
| League Two Young Player of the Season | Nathan Lowe (Walsall) |
| Championship Apprentice of the Season | Chris Rigg (Sunderland) |
| League One Apprentice of the Season | Jake Richards (Exeter City) |
| League Two Apprentice of the Season | Jack Shorrock (Port Vale) |
| 2025 Goal of the Season | George Abbott (Accrington Stanley vs Notts County) |
| Player in the Community | Taylor Moore (Bristol Rovers) |
| Community Club of the Season | Norwich City |
| Community Project of the Season | Plymouth Argyle |
| Fan Engagement Award | Cardiff City |
| Diversity Award | Leyton Orient |
| Green Club Award | Northampton Town |
| Club Employee Award | Ian Darler (Cambridge United) |
| Sir Tom Finney Award | Curtis Davies |
| Contribution to League Football | Neil Warnock |

EFL Teams of the Season

The following players were voted for by the EFL as the best players and managers in their respective leagues.

EFL Championship
| (England) James Trafford | Burnley |
| (England) Jayden Bogle | Leeds United |
| (England) CJ Egan-Riley | Burnley |
| (France) Maxime Estève | Burnley |
| (England) Harrison Burrows | Sheffield United |
| (Japan) Ao Tanaka | Leeds United |
| (England) Jobe Bellingham | Sunderland |
| (Netherlands) Gustavo Hamer | Sheffield United |
| (Wales) Daniel James | Leeds United |
| (United States) Josh Sargent | Norwich City |
| (Spain) Borja Sainz | Norwich City |

Manager: (England) Scott Parker (Burnley)

EFL League One
| (England) Sam Tickle | Wigan Athletic |
| (England) Ryan Barnett | Wrexham |
| (England) Max Cleworth | Wrexham |
| (Austria) Christoph Klarer | Birmingham City |
| (England) Lloyd Jones | Charlton Athletic |
| (England) Alex Cochrane | Birmingham City |
| (Japan) Tomoki Iwata | Birmingham City |
| (England) Lewis Bate | Stockport County |
| (Ghana) Kwame Poku | Peterborough United |
| (Ivory Coast) Richard Kone | Wycombe Wanderers |
| (England) Davis Keillor-Dunn | Barnsley |

Manager: (Wales) Chris Davies (Birmingham City)

EFL League Two
| (England) Owen Goodman | AFC Wimbledon |
| (England) Connor Barrett | Walsall |
| (England) Taylor Allen | Walsall |
| (England) Connor Hall | Port Vale |
| (England) Denver Hume | Grimsby Town |
| (England) Richie Smallwood | Bradford City |
| (England) Luke Molyneux | Doncaster Rovers |
| (England) Jack Payne | Colchester United |
| (Republic of Ireland) David McGoldrick | Notts County |
| (The Gambia) Alassana Jatta | Notts County |
| (England) Michael Cheek | Bromley |

Manager: (Scotland) Graham Alexander (Bradford City)

== 2026 Awards ==
Date: 19 April 2026

Venue: Grosvenor House Hotel, Park Lane, London

| Award | Winner |
|---|---|
| Championship Player of the Season | Hayden Hackney (Middlesbrough) |
| League One Player of the Season | Dom Ballard (Leyton Orient) |
| League Two Player of the Season | Aaron Drinan (Swindon Town) |
| Championship Young Player of the Season | Jordan James (Leicester City) |
| League One Young Player of the Season | Dom Ballard (Leyton Orient) |
| League Two Young Player of the Season | Daniel Kanu (Walsall) |
| Championship Apprentice of the Season | Louis Page (Leicester City) |
| League One Apprentice of the Season | Sulyman Krubally (Burton Albion) |
| League Two Apprentice of the Season | Ollie Dewsbury (Bristol Rovers) |
| 2026 Goal of the Season | Josh Tymon (Swansea City vs Oxford United) |
| Player in the Community | Will Vaulks (Oxford United) |
| Community Club of the Season | Plymouth Argyle |
| Community Project of the Season | Blackburn Rovers |
| Fan Engagement Award | Huddersfield Town |
| Environmental Award | Bradford City |
| Diversity Award | Bristol City |
| Club Employee Award | Wendy Thomas (Middlesbrough) |
| Sir Tom Finney Award | Dean Lewington |
| Contribution to League Football | Brenda Spencer |

EFL Teams of the Season

The following players were voted for by the EFL as the best players and managers in their respective leagues.

EFL Championship
| (England) Carl Rushworth | Coventry City |
| (Netherlands) Milan van Ewijk | Coventry City |
| (France) Tristan Crama | Millwall |
| (England) Callum Doyle | Wrexham |
| (England) Josh Tymon | Swansea City |
| (Nigeria) Femi Azeez | Millwall |
| (England) Hayden Hackney | Middlesbrough |
| (England) Matt Grimes | Coventry City |
| (Wales) Sorba Thomas | Stoke City |
| (United States) Haji Wright | Coventry City |
| (Slovenia) Žan Vipotnik | Swansea City |

Manager: (England) Frank Lampard (Coventry City)

EFL League One
| (England) George Wickens | Lincoln City |
| (Zimbabwe) Tendayi Darikwa | Lincoln City |
| (England) Charlie Goode | Stevenage |
| (England) Sonny Bradley | Lincoln City |
| (Republic of Ireland) Joel Bagan | Cardiff City |
| (England) Amario Cozier-Duberry | Bolton Wanderers |
| (Northern Ireland) Oliver Norwood | Stockport County |
| (England) Owen Bailey | Doncaster Rovers |
| (Republic of Ireland) Jack Moylan | Lincoln City |
| (England) Kyle Wootton | Stockport County |
| (England) Dom Ballard | Leyton Orient |

Manager: (England) Michael Skubala (Lincoln City)

EFL League Two
| (England) Mathew Hudson | Oldham Athletic |
| (England) Jack Sanders | Milton Keynes Dons |
| (England) Omar Sowunmi | Bromley |
| (England) Kelland Watts | Cambridge United |
| (England) Harvey Rodgers | Grimsby Town |
| (England) Isaac Hutchinson | Cheltenham Town |
| (Republic of Ireland) Liam Kelly | Milton Keynes Dons |
| (England) Sammy Braybrooke | Chesterfield |
| (England) Mitch Pinnock | Bromley |
| (Republic of Ireland) Aaron Drinan | Swindon Town |
| (Scotland) Callum Paterson | Milton Keynes Dons |

Manager: (England) Andy Woodman (Bromley)
