= Louis Page (footballer, born 2008) =

English footballer (born 2008)

Personal information
- Full name: Louis Donald Page
- Date of birth: 10 July 2008 (age 18)
- Place of birth: Lutterworth, England
- Height: 6 ft 0 in (1.83 m)
- Position: Midfielder

Team information
- Current team: Leicester City
- Number: 25

Youth career
- –2025: Leicester City

Senior career*
Years	Team	Apps	(Gls)
2025–	Leicester City	31	(1)

International career^{‡}
2024–2025	England U17	14	(1)
2025–	England U18	7	(0)
2025–	England U20	1	(0)
- * Club domestic league appearances and goals as of 20:31, 21 November 2026 (UTC) ‡ National team caps and goals as of 14:35, 3 June 2026 (UTC)

Louis Donald Page (born 10 July 2008) is an English professional footballer who plays as a midfielder for EFL League One club Leicester City. He has played youth international football for England up to under-20 level.

== Early and personal life ==
From Lutterworth, he is the son of former professional footballer Don Page.

== Club career ==
Page made his debut for the Leicester City U21 side in September 2024. Described as a box-to-box midfielder, he was included in The Guardian’s Next Generation 2024: 20 of the best talents at Premier League clubs series in October 2024. He was a member of Leicester City’s Under-16 Premier League Cup winning side in 2023-24.

As a 16 year-old, Page was named Leicester's Academy Player of the Season for the 2024–25 season, in which he played for their Under-18s and Under-21s. He reportedly rejected Leicester's initial offer of a professional contract in July 2025. He was an unused substitute for Leicester's first match of the 2025–26 season in the EFL Championship against Sheffield Wednesday under new Leicester manager Martí Cifuentes. Page made his senior debut on 13 August 2025 in the first round of the EFL Cup, coming on as a second-half substitute for Will Alves in a 2–2 draw against Huddersfield Town. He made his first league start on 23 August, in a 1-0 away win against Charlton Athletic.

Page was named Championship Apprentice of the Season for the 2025–26 season at the 2026 EFL Awards.

== International career ==
Page has played youth international football for England at under-17, under-18 and under-20 levels.

He was a member of England's squad at the 2025 UEFA European Under-17 Championship, and started in their opening game of the tournament against Belgium.

Page made his England under-18 debut during a 3-1 win over Uzbekistan on 3 September 2025. On 10 October 2025, Page made his debut at under-20 level, during a 1-0 defeat to Switzerland at St. George's Park.

On 21 October 2025, Page was included in the England squad for the 2025 FIFA U-17 World Cup. He started in their opening loss against Venezuela. Page started in the knockout phase victory over South Korea and then came off the bench as a substitute in their next match as England were eliminated by Austria in the round of 16.

== Career statistics ==
As of match played 21 November 2026

Appearances and goals by club, season and competition
Club	Season	League			FA Cup		League Cup		Other		Total	
Club	Season	Division	Apps	Goals	Apps	Goals	Apps	Goals	Apps	Goals	Apps	Goals
Leicester City U21	2024–25	—			—		—		1 (Note: Appearances in EFL Trophy)	0	1	0
Leicester City	2025–26	Championship	18	0	2	0	1	0	—		21	0
Leicester City	2026–27	League One	13	1	1	1	2	0	0	0	16	2
Leicester City	Total		31	1	3	1	3	0	0	0	37	2
Career total			31	1	3	1	3	0	1	0	38	2

== Honours ==
Individual

- EFL Championship Apprentice of the Season: 2025–26
