= St Philip Howard Catholic High School =

The St Philip Howard Catholic School

Location
- Elm Grove South; Barnham, West Sussex, PO22 0EN; England; 50°50′01″N 0°38′42″W

Information
- Type: Academy
- Motto: Fiat voluntas domini
- Religious affiliation: Roman Catholic
- Established: 1959
- Local authority: West Sussex
- Trust: BOSCO CATHOLIC EDUCATION TRUST UID= 16631
- Specialist: Humanities College
- Department for Education URN: 144243 Tables
- Ofsted: Reports
- Chair of Governors: Richard Meredith
- Headteacher: Timothy Hulse
- Gender: Coeducational
- Age: 11 to 18
- Enrolment: 1247
- Capacity: 1033
- Houses: 7
- Colours: Gold, Maroon, Black
- Website: http://www.sphcs.co.uk

St Philip Howard Catholic School is an Ofsted rated "outstanding' secondary school for 11-18 year olds located between Chichester and Arundel, in the village of Barnham, West Sussex, England. It supports a strong Catholic ethos, although is open to pupils of all faiths. Since 2017 it has held 'Specialist Humanities College' and 'Teaching School' status. In 2016 the school became an academy member of the BOSCO Catholic education trust.

== Description ==
The Headteacher is Mr Tim Hulse and the Chair of Governors is Mr R Meredith. There are 1050 pupils on roll

The school serves a wide area that includes but is not limited to Chichester, Arundel, Worthing, Midhurst, Bognor Regis and parts of Littlehampton. It has a sixth form of roughly 250 students, which is open to all faiths. It offers a wide range of subjects to study at A-level.

The sixth form is open for application to both internal students (students that studied at SPH), and external candidates (students that received their secondary education elsewhere). The sixth form does not have a uniform policy, however students must wear their ID card visibly at all times; which they use to enter the front gate.

All pupils are educated in the context of the Catholic tradition. School Church services are held in the sports hall, along with Days of Reflection, (where children go to a church to pray). They offer many subjects for secondary students; English, German, French, Spanish, Science, Maths, Religious Education, Physical Education, Citizenship, History, Geography, Drama, Dance, Music, Art, Computer Science, Media, Creative i/Media, Business Studies, Food Tech, Wood Tech, Graphics, Computer Graphics and Textiles.

The school has 7 houses; Saint Bernadette's - Pink, Saint Cuthman's - Red, Saint Dunstan's - Green, Saint Edmund's - Orange, Saint Richard's - Blue, Saint Teresa's - Purple, Saint Wilfred's - Yellow

== Pastoral ==
This is run on a heads of year system. Older pupils work with the teachers to look after younger students and head off emotional issues before they become problems. Sixth formers are trained to act as learning assistants, and work with the staff in Key Stage 3 classes.

=== School council ===
The school runs a school junior leadership team made up of 25 students with five students coming from each year group. Senior prefects are chosen in Year 11 and Head Girl and Head Boy are chosen in Year 13. This system is displayed as good practice to visiting head teachers from partnership schools in Rwanda, Uganda and Ethiopia. Students and teachers share experiences with ES Kagogo

== Academics ==
=== Key Stage 4 ===
Students study ten GSCEs in the areas of English language and literature, mathematics, religious studies, and two sciences. Physical education and three other subjects are also required.

=== Academic Performance ===
In 2018 the school was rated the highest in West Sussex against the new 'Attainment 8' Key GCSE subject scores per pupil, including English, Maths, Sciences and Humanities at the end of key stage 4. 1st out of 92 secondary schools. The last (2016) Ofsted report rated the school as uniformly "outstanding" across all metrics and the school was also graded 'outstanding' in a Section 48 inspectorate for its Catholic ethos and Christian character.

== Extra Curricular ==
The school offers a variety of clubs and sports including Rugby, Hockey, Basketball, Netball and Football; as well as foreign language clubs, dance and musical theatre and a debating society. The school also offers 3 levels of the Duke of Edinburgh programme and has an orchestra and school band.

=== Local youth politics ===
The school participates in the elections for the UK Youth Parliament and the West Sussex Youth Cabinet every year in March, often fielding several candidates.
