= Will Alves =

English footballer (born 2005)

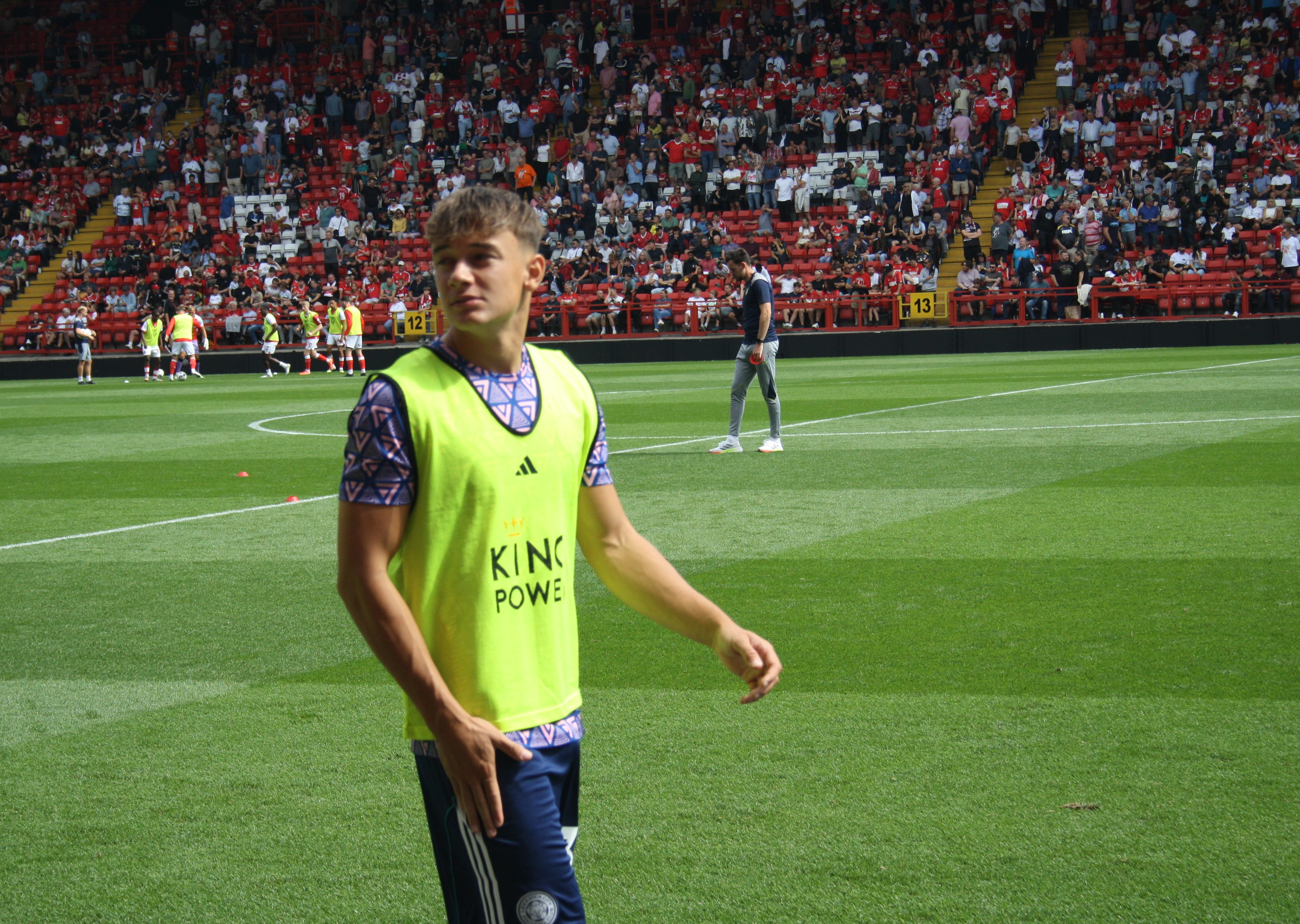
- Will Alves in 2025.

Personal information
- Full name: William Thomas Alves
- Date of birth: 4 May 2005 (age 21)
- Place of birth: Leicester, England
- Height: 1.69 m (5 ft 7 in)
- Positions: Winger; attacking midfielder

Team information
- Current team: Leicester City
- Number: 37

Youth career
- 2014–2022: Leicester City

Senior career*
Years	Team	Apps	(Gls)
2022–	Leicester City	11	(2)
2025	→ Cardiff City (loan)	14	(1)
2025–2026	→ Huddersfield Town (loan)	12	(1)

International career^{‡}
2022	England U17	6	(0)
2022	England U18	3	(0)
2024	England U20	3	(1)
- * Club domestic league appearances and goals as of 22:12, 20 October 2026 (UTC) ‡ National team caps and goals as of 08:31, 27 September 2024 (UTC)

William Thomas Alves (born 4 May 2005) is an English professional footballer who plays as a winger or attacking midfielder for EFL League One club Leicester City.

== Club career ==
Alves joined Leicester City at under-9s level and progressed through the Academy before making his senior debut at age 16. On 8 January 2022, Alves made his professional club debut for Leicester as an 86th minute substitute for Ademola Lookman during a 4–1 win against Watford in the third round of the FA Cup.

On 21 December 2022, Alves suffered a torn ACL in the second half of extra time in a 3–1 win over Wolverhampton Wanderers in the FA Youth Cup. The injury was caused by a foul from Caden Voice and caused a public outcry. Leicester manager Brendan Rodgers called the challenge "one of the worst I have seen".

Alves returned to the U21 team on 3 November 2023, scoring in a 2–2 draw against Newcastle that was later abandoned. He followed this by playing the first half in a EFL Trophy match against Fleetwood Town that finished in a 4–0 defeat on 7 November.

In August 2024, Alves signed a new four-year contract for the club. Alves made his Premier League debut as a substitute in the 2–0 defeat to Manchester City on 29 December 2024.

On 3 February 2025, Alves moved to Championship side Cardiff City on loan for the rest of the season. He made his club debut for Cardiff on 8 February in a FA Cup match against Stoke City. The match was 3–3 before going to penalties, which Cardiff won 4–2. He made his league debut on 11 February in a 2–1 defeat to Portsmouth. He scored his first goal in a 2–2 draw with Preston North End on 8 April.

On September 1, 2025, Alves moved to EFL League One side Huddersfield Town on loan for the rest of the season.

== International career ==
In February 2022 Alves represented the England under-17 team against Scotland.

On 21 September 2022, he made his England U18 debut as a substitute during a 1–0 win over Netherlands at the Pinatar Arena.

On 7 June 2024, Alves made a goalscoring debut for the England U20s during a 2-1 win over Sweden at Stadion ŠRC Sesvete.

== Personal life ==
Born in England, Alves is of Portuguese descent. In 2018, while he was a Year 9 pupil at Brookvale Groby Learning Campus, Alves won the MOTD "Can You Kick It" competition to find the UK's best young technical freestyle footballer.

== Career statistics ==
=== Club ===
As of match played 20 October 2026

Appearances and goals by club, season and competition
Club	Season	League			FA Cup		EFL Cup		Europe		Other		Total	
Club	Season	Division	Apps	Goals	Apps	Goals	Apps	Goals	Apps	Goals	Apps	Goals	Apps	Goals
Leicester City U21	2021–22	—			—		—		—		3 (Note: Appearances in EFL Trophy)	0	3	0
Leicester City U21	2022–23	—			—		—		—		3	1	3	1
Leicester City U21	2023–24	—			—		—		—		1	0	1	0
Leicester City U21	Total		—		—		—		—		7	1	7	1
Leicester City	2021–22	Premier League	0	0	1	0	0	0	0	0	0	0	1	0
Leicester City	2022–23	Premier League	0	0	0	0	1	0	—		—		1	0
Leicester City	2023–24	Championship	0	0	0	0	0	0	—		—		0	0
Leicester City	2024–25	Premier League	1	0	0	0	2	0	—		—		3	0
Leicester City	2025–26	Championship	0	0	0	0	1	0	—		—		1	0
Leicester City	2026–27	League One	10	2	0	0	2	0	—		2	0	14	2
Leicester City	Total		11	2	1	0	6	0	0	0	2	0	20	2
Cardiff City (loan)	2024–25	Championship	14	1	1	0	0	0	—		—		15	1
Huddersfield Town (loan)	2025–26	League One	12	1	0	0	0	0	—		3	1	15	2
Career total			37	4	2	0	6	0	0	0	12	2	56	6
