= Antti Kangasniemi =

Finnish ice hockey player

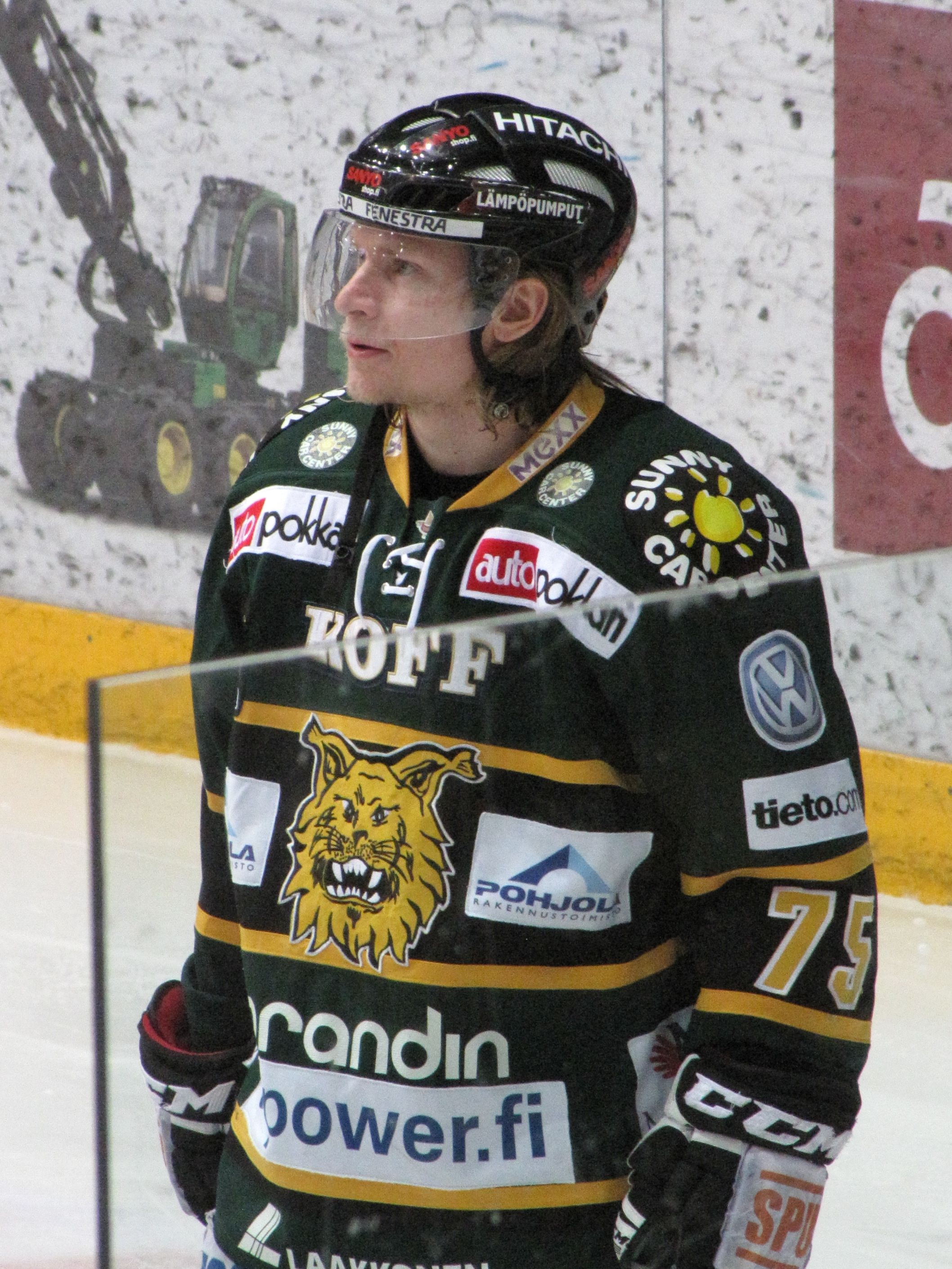
- Born: June 6, 1985 (age 40) Tampere, Finland
- Height: 5 ft 10 in (178 cm)
- Weight: 181 lb (82 kg; 12 st 13 lb)
- Position: Centre
- Shot: Left
- Played for: Ilves; Hokki; LeKi; Tappara; Vaasan Sport; Rungsted Seier Capital; Asplöven HC
- NHL draft: Undrafted
- Playing career: 2005–2018

Antti Kangasniemi (born June 6, 1985) is a Finnish ice hockey player who currently plays professionally in Finland for Tappara of the SM-liiga.

== Career statistics ==
			Regular season					Playoffs
Season	Team	League	GP	G	A	Pts	PIM	GP	G	A	Pts	PIM
2000–01	Ilves U16	U16 SM-sarja	10	10	8	18	24	11	10	2	12	12
2000–01	Ilves U18	U18 SM-sarja	3	4	1	5	2	—	—	—	—	—
2001–02	Ilves U18	U18 SM-sarja	26	13	8	21	17	4	4	2	6	2
2001–02	Ilves U20	U20 SM-liiga	4	0	0	0	4	—	—	—	—	—
2002–03	Ilves U18	U18 SM-sarja	17	8	9	17	46	2	0	0	0	0
2002–03	Ilves U20	U20 SM-liiga	14	4	2	6	12	—	—	—	—	—
2003–04	Ilves U20	U20 SM-liiga	33	3	6	9	14	—	—	—	—	—
2004–05	Ilves U20	U20 SM-liiga	38	8	24	32	48	9	3	3	6	14
2005–06	Ilves U20	U20 SM-liiga	21	8	13	21	36	3	0	3	3	12
2005–06	Ilves	SM-liiga	4	0	0	0	0	—	—	—	—	—
2006–07	Hokki	Mestis	31	6	19	25	36	12	0	10	10	12
2007–08	Hokki	Mestis	44	12	21	33	56	12	2	5	7	8
2008–09	LeKi	Mestis	4	0	3	3	4	—	—	—	—	—
2008–09	Tappara	SM-liiga	15	3	1	4	2	—	—	—	—	—
2009–10	Tappara	SM-liiga	9	1	2	3	2	9	1	0	1	4
2010–11	Tappara	SM-liiga	57	10	16	26	56	—	—	—	—	—
2011–12	Tappara	SM-liiga	9	0	1	1	2	—	—	—	—	—
2011–12	Ilves	SM-liiga	50	9	10	19	36	—	—	—	—	—
2012–13	Ilves	SM-liiga	56	8	9	17	72	—	—	—	—	—
2013–14	Ilves	Liiga	59	6	10	16	44	—	—	—	—	—
2014–15	Vaasan Sport	Liiga	28	2	4	6	32	—	—	—	—	—
2015–16	LeKi	Mestis	3	0	2	2	0	—	—	—	—	—
2015–16	Rungsted Seier Capital	Denmark	34	17	18	35	20	4	0	0	0	4
2016–17	Asplöven HC	Hockeyettan	22	6	11	17	16	—	—	—	—	—
2017–18	LeKi	Mestis	45	9	26	35	38	5	1	0	1	4
2017–18	Ilves	Liiga	8	1	1	2	0	—	—	—	—	—
SM-liiga totals			295	40	54	94	246	9	1	0	1	4
Mestis totals			127	27	71	98	134	29	3	15	18	24
