= Tapio Kangasniemi =

Finnish volleyball player (born 1979)

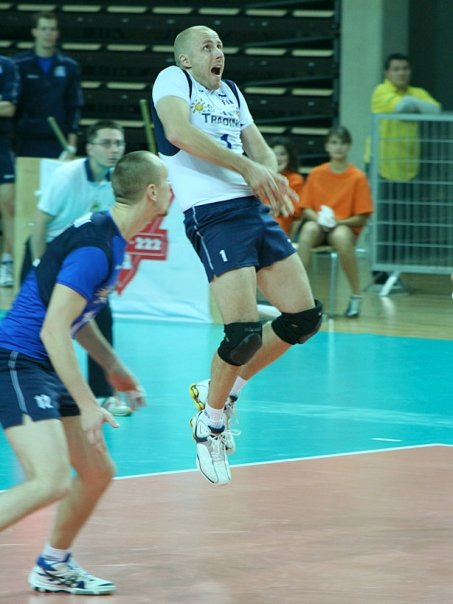
Kangasniemi receives in national team game

Tapio Kangasniemi (born 7 March 1979, in Jakobstad) is a former professional volleyball player from Finland. He played libero in Finnish volleyball team since 2001. Kangasniemi retired from national team in summer 2008. He works now as a volleyball coach.

== Career ==
Kangasniemi started his career 9-years old in Kauhavan Wisa. After his junior year, he became top player in the Finland. He started playing in Finland Champion league in Tampereen Isku-Volley. In Isku-Volley, he won two Finland Champions seasons 2002 and 2006, silver medal in season 2003 and bronze medal in season 2005. Media have elected him three times Finland Champion league as best libero in the seasons 2002, 2004 and 2006.

In season 2007–2008, Kangasniemi played in Italy A2-league in Isernia team. He was best libero in the league and legavolley chose him to All-Star game against best players in A1-league. After one season in Italy Kangasniemi made contract with Tampereen Isku-Volley and started play again in Tampere. Kangasniemi won with Isku-Volley Finnish Cup silver and Finland league bronze in season 2008–09.

After season Kangasniemi announced that he retire from national team. Kangasniemi moved from Tampere to Seinäjoki. He played on amateur player in Kuutoset Volley 2009–11 in Finland 1. division.

== National team ==
Kangasniemi played his first match in national team season 2002 against Tunisia. Season 2005 Kangasniemi had planned to end his career, but Finland national team new coach Mauro Berruto got inspired to Kangasniemi and Tapio continue his career. Continue career was not bad decision to Tapio. He played his best games in national team summers 2006 and 2007 when Finland played in Volleyball World league. Finland too survive to European Championships, where Tapio and team made Finland ballgames history became fourth place. Kangasniemi was one of the best liberos in the competition.

Kangasniemi announced before national team season 2009 that he is coming to retire from national team games. Finland team coach Mauro Berruto understood this very well and write a letter to Kangasniemi. Berruto said that Kangasniemi was one of the players who make him high effort.

== Personal life ==
His son Ilari is a professional footballer.

== Achievements ==
Personal:

- Best libero in A2-league Italy 2008
- Finland league best libero 2002, 2004, 2006
- Second place in digbource in European Championships 2007
- Fourth place in receivebource in European Championships 2007

Team

- Finland Champion 2002, 2006
- Finland league 2. place 2003
- Finland league 3. place 2005
- Finland Cup-Champion 2001, 2002
- European Championships 4. place 2007

== Teams ==
- 1998–1999: Ylihärmän Kisa
- 1999–2000: Isku-Volley
- 2000–2001: Isku-Volley
- 2001–2002: Isku-Volley
- 2002–2003: Isku-Volley
- 2003–2004: Isku-Volley
- 2004–2005: Isku-Volley
- 2005–2006: Isku-Volley
- 2006–2007: Isku-Volley, Finland
- 2007–2008: Isernia, Italy
- 2008–09: Isku-Volley
