= Olabade Aluko =

English footballer (born 2006)

Personal information
- Full name: Olabade Olatomiwo Samuel Aluko
- Date of birth: 1 October 2006 (age 20)
- Place of birth: Westminster, England
- Height: 6 ft 0 in (1.82 m)
- Position: Right-back

Team information
- Current team: Leicester City
- Number: 32

Youth career
- 2021–2025: Leicester City

Senior career*
Years	Team	Apps	(Gls)
2025–	Leicester City	10	(0)

International career^{‡}
2025–	England U20	3	(0)
- * Club domestic league appearances and goals as of 21:42, 28 August 2026 (UTC) ‡ National team caps and goals as of 23:29, 31 March 2026 (UTC)

Olabade Olatomiwo Samuel Aluko (born 1 October 2006) is an English professional footballer who plays as a right-back for EFL League One club Leicester City.

== Career ==
Aluko joined the youth academy of Leicester City in 2021. On 25 May 2025, Aluko made his professional debut for Leicester in the Premier League, coming on as an 89th-minute substitute for Victor Kristiansen in a 2–0 away defeat to Bournemouth. On 9 June 2025, he signed his first professional contract with Leicester, ahead of the 2025–26 season.

On his EFL Championship debut for Leicester on 25 November 2025, in an away game vs Southampton, Aluko was sent off within 33 minutes for a double yellow card offence.

== International career ==
On 10 October 2025, Aluko made his England U20 debut during a 1–0 defeat to Switzerland at St. George's Park.

== Personal life ==
Born in England, Aluko is of Nigerian descent.

== Career statistics ==
As of match played 25 August 2026

Appearances and goals by club, season and competition
Club	Season	League			FA Cup		League Cup		Other		Total	
Club	Season	Division	Apps	Goals	Apps	Goals	Apps	Goals	Apps	Goals	Apps	Goals
Leicester City U21	2023–24	—			—		—		1 (Note: Appearances in EFL Trophy)	0	1	0
Leicester City U21	2024–25	—			—		—		2	0	2	0
Leicester City U21	Total		—		—		—		3	0	3	0
Leicester City	2024–25	Premier League	1	0	0	0	0	0	—		1	0
Leicester City	2025–26	Championship	8	0	2	0	0	0	—		10	0
Leicester City	2026–27	League One	1	0	0	0	2	1	0	0	3	1
Leicester City	Total		10	0	2	0	2	1	0	0	14	1
Career total			10	0	2	0	2	1	3	0	17	1
