= The Priory School, Shrewsbury =

The Priory School

Location
- Longden Road; Radbrook; Shrewsbury, Shropshire, SY3 9EE; England; 52°41′45″N 2°46′05″W

Information
- Type: Academy
- Motto: Selfless, Self-Assured, Successful
- Established: September 1939
- Specialist: Teaching School
- Department for Education URN: 138216 Tables
- Ofsted: Reports
- Chair of Governors: Ian Peterson
- Principal: Alison Pope
- Gender: Coeducational
- Age: 11 to 16
- Enrolment: 831 pupils
- Houses: Parks House, Nightingale house, Frank house, King house, Attenborough house, Hawking house
- Colours: Green and Black
- Website: https://priory.tpstrust.co.uk/

The Priory School is a secondary school with academy status in the market town of Shrewsbury, Shropshire, England. The school was opened in September 1939 and became a Business and Enterprise College in 2003, with the addition of Applied GCSE courses to the curriculum. The Priory was a girls' grammar school linked to the Priory Grammar School for Boys, but has since become a mixed gender school.

The Business and Enterprise training centre was opened in September 2004 and became an Enterprise Hub in April 2006, and was awarded High Performing Specialist School status at the start of the academic year 2007–08.

The school has no sixth form, but is in partnership with the Shrewsbury Colleges Group, which was created by the merging of the two main local further education institutions (Shrewsbury Sixth Form College and Shrewsbury College), which the large majority of pupils go on to attend. The school was granted Academy status in June 2012. It became a multi-academy trust in 2016 with Coleham School and St Martins, followed by Thomas Adams School in March 2020. In 2013, an Ofsted inspection report rated the school as 'outstanding' in all four categories (in both of its previous inspections), making the school the top performing in the county by Ofsted's criteria.

== Houses ==
Each of the school's six houses, named after famous people from or associated with Shropshire, battles it out for the 'House Cup', received by the house with the most points at the end of the house year. They are currently called Attenborough, Frank, Hawking, King, Nightingale, and Parks (Named after Sir David Attenborough, Anne Frank, Stephen Hawking, Martin Luther King, Florence Nightingale, and Rosa Parks). The Houses were formerly known as Acton, Baxter, Clive, Darwin, Housman and Webb, however this was changed via a vote during the 2020-21 academic year. This runs from the start of the summer term to the end of the following spring term, so pupils in Year 11 are always still at school when the cup is awarded.

Every year the school holds a variety concert organised and presented by Year 11 Drama and Music Officials, with support from the Head of Drama and Music. It was formerly known as the Eisteddfod but was renamed the 'Pro Show' in 2005. The event showcases dancing, singing, bands, drama sketches and stand-up comedy, all performed by pupils. In 2014, a new video category was introduced, allowing pupils to be awarded for multimedia creations. Due to the COVID-19 pandemic, this show was done virtually for the 2021-22.

== Notable alumni ==
=== Priory Boys Grammar School ===
- Andrew Barnard, cricketer
- John Davies, cricketer
- Mark Davies, cricketer
- Geoffrey Othen, cricketer

=== Priory County School for Girls ===
- Marjorie Chibnall, historian

=== The Priory School ===
- Neil Edmond, actor
- Kevin Seabury, footballer
- Jack Shantry, cricketer
- Elliott Durrell, footballer
