= Shrewsbury College (disambiguation) =

Shrewsbury College is a further education college in Shrewsbury, Shropshire, England.

Shrewsbury College may also refer to:

- Shrewsbury Sixth Form College, located in Shrewsbury town centre
- Shrewsbury College (fictional), in the novels of Dorothy L. Sayers, the fictional Oxford college attended by Harriet Vane
