= Meole Brace School =

Secondary school in Shrewsbury, England

Location
- Longden Road; Shrewsbury, Shropshire, SY3 9DW; England
- 52.6922°N 2.7687°W

Information
- Type: Academy
- Motto: Achievement * Respect * Community
- Established: 1956
- Local authority: Shropshire Council
- Trust: Central Shropshire Academy Trust
- Department for Education URN: 146146 Tables
- Ofsted: Reports
- Headteacher: Seema Purewal
- Gender: Coeducational
- Age: 11 to 16
- Enrolment: 1282
- Colour: Blue
- Website: meolebrace.com

Meole Brace School is a coeducational secondary school in the suburb of Meole Brace, Shrewsbury, England. It is one of two state-funded secondary schools in South Shrewsbury and serves a wide catchment area which includes Meole Brace, areas of Belle Vue and Radbrook, as well as Bayston Hill and some rural settlements south of Shrewsbury.

It previously held Science College specialist status and was awarded the Sportsmark by the Sports Council. Ofsted rated the school "Good" in 2024, paying special attention to the above average results in Religious Studies, Geography, Drama and Modern Foreign Languages at GCSE level. The school also has Ofsted "Good" ratings in every category.

Previously a community school administered by Shropshire Council, in January 2019 Meole Brace School converted to academy status. The school is now sponsored by the Central Shropshire Academy Trust.

As Meole Brace School does not have a sixth form, students transfer to Shrewsbury Sixth Form College, Shrewsbury College or a private school. Still, Meole Brace - sometimes abbreviated to MBS - is the largest secondary school within Shrewsbury.

== Notable former pupils ==
- Nick Beighton, Paralympic bronze medallist
- Joe Hart, footballer
- Mason Springthorpe, footballer
