= Philip A. Barker =

British archaeologist

Philip Arthur Barker (22 August 1920 – 8 January 2001) was a British archaeologist who is best known for his work on excavation methodology.

== Education ==
He left school with no qualifications and served in the RAF during the Second World War before he trained as a teacher. He taught Art at the Priory Grammar School for Boys, Shrewsbury and established an archaeological society at the school, which conducted a large number of excavations in the area, including a section of the town walls at Roushill in Shrewsbury.

== Career ==
His interest in archaeology led him to become an academic at the University of Birmingham. For many years, he was the archaeologist at Worcester Cathedral, where he organised a regular symposium on church archaeology and history.

During the 1970s and the 1980s, he worked to help establish Rescue and the Institute of Field Archaeologists and undertook excavation work at Wroxeter and Hen Domen. He served as the chair of the Clwyd-Powys Archaeological Trust from 1984 to 1991.

He wrote a comprehensive guide to field archaeology, Techniques of Archaeological Excavation, in 1977, and it remains in print.

Barker specialised in castle studies and in 1987 was a founding member of the Castle Studies Group. The excavations at Hen Domen led to the publication of a book about the project and another about timber castles more broadly, jointly written with Robert Higham.

== Bibliography ==
- Chris Musson and Charles Hill. "Philip Barker 1920–2001." Council for British Archaeology, Wales. "Online Information for Archaeology in Wales, Newsletter No. 21". Archived from the original on 7 November 2002., Spring 2001.
- "Philip Barker: An archaeologist inspired by art". Archived from the original on 30 November 2001. by Robert Higham.
