= Wakeman School =

The Wakeman School and Arts College

Location
- Abbey Foregate; Shrewsbury, Shropshire, SY2 6AA; England
- Coordinates: 52°42′27″N 2°44′49″W

Information
- Type: Comprehensive
- Closed: 2013
- Local authority: Shropshire
- Specialist: Arts College
- Department for Education URN: 123563 Tables
- Ofsted: Reports
- Gender: Coeducational
- Age: 11 to 16
- Houses: Quarry, Castle and Abbey
- Colours: Green, Black, White
- Website: http://www.wakeman.shropshire.sch.uk/

The Wakeman School and Arts College (formerly Shrewsbury Technical High School) was a co-educational comprehensive school located in Shrewsbury, the county town of Shropshire, England. The school was the only state secondary school in the town centre, located just to the east of the English Bridge.

The Wakeman School viewed from across the River Severn, with the English Bridge to the right.

The school was awarded the ‘Artsmark Gold’ by Arts Council England, and a new ICT (information and communication technology) facility was completed during the summer holidays of 2008.

In September 2008 the school was granted Specialist School status for Visual Art with Music and Drama in recognition of its particular strengths in these areas. The extra funding available was used to enhance and upgrade facilities for these subjects including setting up a state-of-the-art’ Multimedia Studio.

In March 2011 inspection, Ofsted judged the school to be 'Good' with 'Outstanding' features. The report praised "the outstanding leadership of its headteacher" and wrote "This is a good school which has improved rapidly. All groups of students make at least good progress... Students, parents and carers repeatedly told inspectors that the school is one big, warm family." In 2011 the school progressed to 61.5% of students achieving at least 5 GCSEs at grades A* to C, including English and Maths.

In September 2011 as part of its cuts, Shropshire Council decided that the school should close. Despite a ferocious 'Why Waste Wakeman' campaign by staff, students, parents, governors and the wider community the school formally closed on 19 July 2013.

To mark its closure and celebrate its role in Shrewsbury the school created The Wakeman 'Look Up' Art Town Trail featuring the work of Wakeman students spanning over 30 years as a lasting legacy to the school.

Following the school's closure, its former site is now used by Shrewsbury Sixth Form College.

== Notable former pupils ==
=== Shrewsbury Technical High School ===
- Wilfred Owen - poet

=== Wakeman Grammar School ===
- Duncan Perry - cricketer
- Stephen Gale - cricketer
