= 2010–11 Manchester City F.C. season =

English football club season

Manchester City
2010–11 season
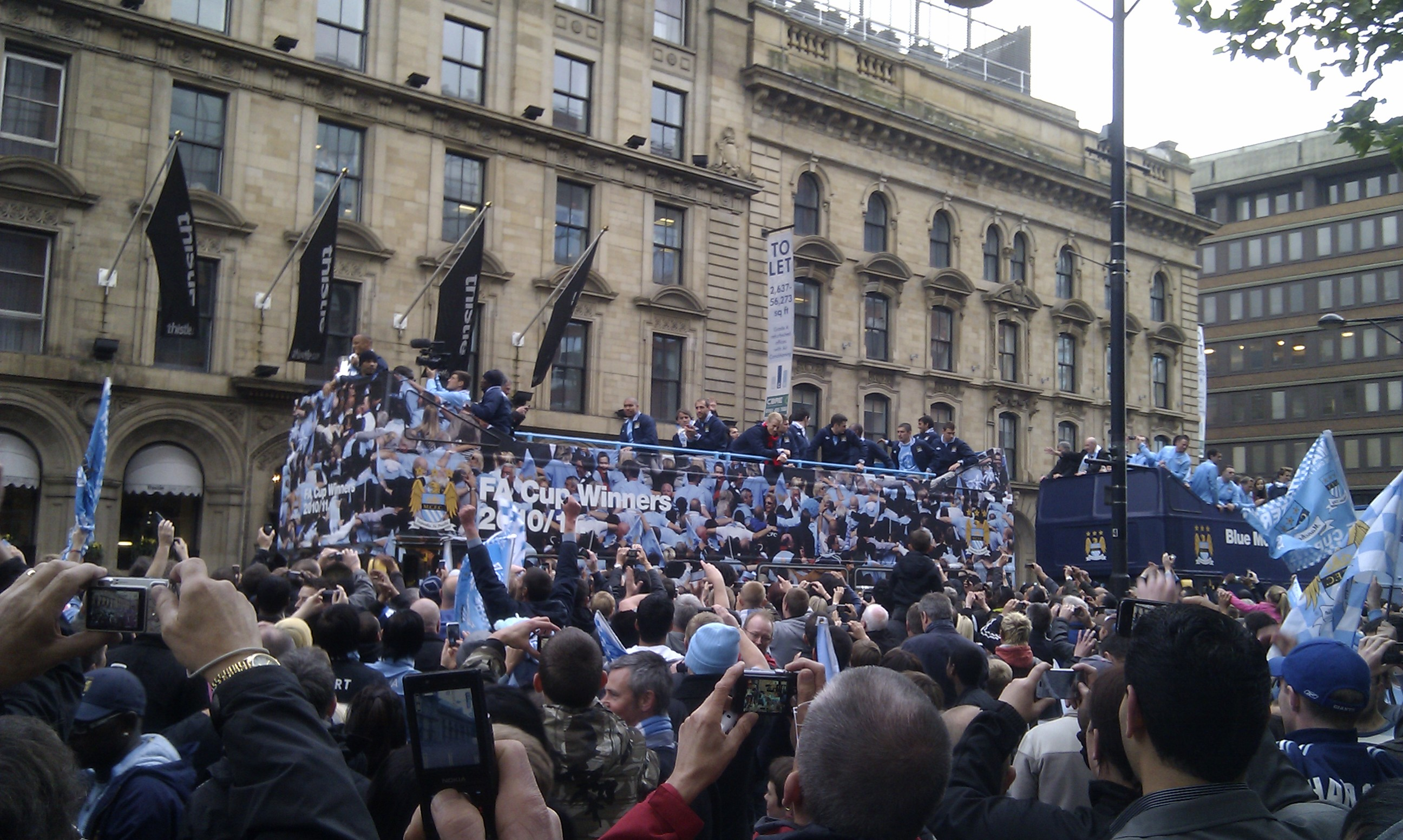
- Parade in Manchester dedicated to winning the FA Cup and ending 35-year trophy drought
- Owner: Abu Dhabi United Group
- Chairman: Khaldoon Al Mubarak
- Manager: Roberto Mancini
- Stadium: City of Manchester Stadium
- Premier League: 3rd
- FA Cup: Winners
- League Cup: Third round
- UEFA Europa League: Round of 16
- Top goalscorer: League: Carlos Tevez (20); All: Carlos Tevez (23)
- Highest home attendance: 47,393 vs Arsenal (24 October 2010)
- Lowest home attendance: 23,542 vs Timișoara (26 August 2010)
- Average home league attendance: 45,972
Home colours	Away colours	Third colours

The 2010–11 season was Manchester City Football Club's 109th season of competitive football, 82nd season in the top flight of English football and 14th season in the Premier League. As City finished fifth in previous season's league campaign, they qualified for the recently rebranded UEFA Europa League. The Blues were managed by Roberto Mancini, who had been appointed midway through the previous season.

The season is best remembered by City's title run in the FA Cup, which saw them defeat rivals Manchester United in the semi-finals before overcoming Stoke City in the final, both by a 1–0 scoreline. The triumph ended Manchester City's 35-year wait for the silverware and signified the start of a new era under the CFG ownership. The season was also notable due to the club finishing third in the Premier League and qualifying for next season's UEFA Champions League, something that had not happened since 1967–68, when the Blues qualified for the old European Cup via their league title victory.

== Season review ==
In the summer transfer window, the club, one of the richest in the world since its 2008 takeover by the Abu Dhabi United Group, spent £126 million on players, including Jérôme Boateng from Hamburger SV, Yaya Touré from Barcelona, David Silva from Valencia, Aleksandar Kolarov from Lazio, Mario Balotelli from Inter Milan and James Milner from Aston Villa. Popular City midfielder Stephen Ireland was transferred to Aston Villa as part of a player exchange agreement in the Milner deal.

The team began this season's campaign well, collecting four out of a possible six points against Top 7 opponents Tottenham Hotspur and Liverpool, which was three points more than City managed in the comparable fixtures last season. The Blues then stuttered for a couple of games against Sunderland (away) and Blackburn Rovers (at home), bagging only a single home point out of the six despite completely dominating both games, with (according to manager Roberto Mancini) at least 25 missed chances in the Blackburn game alone. City got itself back on a winning track again with a 0–2 away win against Wigan Athletic, which was the first time the team had ever won at the DW Stadium, breaking what some supporters had labelled a jinx for this fixture.

After the previous season's run to the semi-finals of the League Cup, the team's performance in that competition this season was very disappointing, with the Blues falling at the first hurdle, losing 2–1 to West Bromwich Albion in the third round tie played at The Hawthorns.

City began its Europa League campaign in much better style, clocking up three back-to-back wins in its first three games. In the first leg 1–0 away victory over Timișoara in the play-off round, Mario Balotelli scored the single winning goal on his debut, but also incurred a serious knee injury that required surgery, putting him out of action for the next three months. Balotelli was not the only one of City's new crop of high-profile summer signings to fall victim to an early serious injury, with Jérôme Boateng missing out on the first six weeks of the new season due to a knee injury he picked up playing for Germany in an international friendly match against Denmark back in mid-August, while Aleksandar Kolarov seriously damaged his ankle ligaments in the opening match of the season against Tottenham Hotspur. The loss of Boateng and Kolarov – taken together with recent injuries to Micah Richards (hamstring), Wayne Bridge (thigh injury coming right on the back of a prolonged absence due to a cracked foot bone) and Joleon Lescott (groin) – meant that Roberto Mancini found himself without five of his eight main back four defenders going into City's home match against Chelsea, causing him to claim that he had a defensive injury crisis for that game, which nevertheless City still managed to win convincingly due to a stellar defensive performance from the back four (Dedryck Boyata, Kolo Touré, Vincent Kompany and Pablo Zabaleta) that Mancini was able to field.

== Kits ==
Supplier: Umbro / Sponsor: Etihad Airways

Home	Away	Third	Third alt.	Goalkeeper 1	Goalkeeper 1 alt.	Goalkeeper 2	Goalkeeper 3

=== Kit information ===
Umbro made a new set of kits for Manchester City whilst they were in their second year of contract with the club.

- Home: The home kit was in City's traditional colours of sky blue and white in a classic design modelled on the club's outfits worn in the late 1960s. Featuring white cuffs and subtle shadow stripes on the body, the home strip was kitted out with white shorts and sky blue socks, which had a maroon turnover on the top.
- Away: The away kit was mainly navy with sky blue detailing and sported thin horizontal sky blue striping on the socks. The kit was described on the club's website as the "dark side of the moon".
- Third: The white third kit last season was retained, but was refitted with white shorts and socks, the latter sporting a red-and-black band to echo the sash on the body.
- Keeper: The last season goalkeeper kits were also retained, though a new all-black kit had been added to the collection for this season, to be used primarily with the home team kit. Last season's all-green home goalkeeper strip had been moved over to the away kit, although it was still used with the home team kit when the all-black kit was considered to be too close in colour to the opposition's strip (e.g., Chelsea and Newcastle United). The gold-and-black goalkeeper strip that was used primarily with the away kit last season had been retained as an alternate (third) choice kit for the goalkeepers. As could be determined from the foregoing, which of the three team kits these goalkeeper strips were actually used with was not a hard and fast rule since any of these strips could be swapped around (if necessary) in order to avoid kit clashes with the opponents' team strips or the opponents' goalkeeper strips, as well as avoiding clashes with the strips worn by the match officials.

On 2 February 2011, there was a minor "kit faux pas" when the Manchester City team wore its regular home team kit for its away fixture against Birmingham City at St Andrew's, a fixture that usually required the visiting Manchester City team to use one of its alternative strips (in this case, its third team kit since the midnight blue away kit also represented a colour clash), as the primary home team colours of both sides combined a blue shirt with white shorts. No explanation had ever come as to why this mix-up occurred (because as per which kits were to be worn in which fixtures was determined before the season even began), or why the referee, Kevin Friend, allowed two teams so similarly clad onto the pitch rather than insist that one of them first change its kit, although Birmingham's 2010–11 home shirt features large elements of white. Since then, there have been multiple instances of City wearing sky blue against teams in royal blue.

== Pre-season games ==
Friendly

18 July 2010	Portland Timbers	0–3	Manchester City	Portland, Oregon, United States
03:00 BST		MCFC report	Ireland 43'; Adebayor 44'; Jô 68'	Stadium: Merlo Field; Attendance: 5,018; Referee: Jair Marrufo (United States)

New York Football Challenge

Team	Pld	W	D	L	GF	GA	GD	Pts
(Portugal) Sporting CP (C)	2	1	1	0	4	2	+2	8
(England) Tottenham Hotspur	2	1	1	0	4	3	+1	8
(United States) New York Red Bulls	2	1	0	1	3	2	+1	6
(England) Manchester City	2	0	0	2	1	4	−3	1

(C) Champions

24 July 2010	Sporting CP	2–0	Manchester City	Harrison, New Jersey, United States
01:30 BST	Djaló 23', 39'	MCFC report		Stadium: Red Bull Arena; Attendance: 13,586; Referee: Kevin Stott (United States)

25 July 2010	New York Red Bulls	2–1	Manchester City	Harrison, New Jersey, United States
20:00 BST	Kandji 7'; Richards 70'	MCFC report	Jô 55'	Stadium: Red Bull Arena; Attendance: 23,228; Referee: Michael Kennedy (United States)

Atlanta International Soccer Challenge

29 July 2010	América	1–1 (1–4 p)	Manchester City	Atlanta, Georgia, United States
01:00 BST	Esqueda 47'	MCFC report	Adebayor 36' (pen.)	Stadium: Georgia Dome; Attendance: 33,721; Referee: Mark Geiger (United States)
	Penalties
	Pardo (penalty scored); Mosquera (penalty missed); Montenegro (penalty missed)		(penalty scored) Adebayor; (penalty scored) Jô; (penalty scored) Weiss; (penalty scored) Vieira

Pirelli Cup

1 August 2010	Inter Milan	3–0	Manchester City	Baltimore, Maryland, United States
01:00 BST	Obinna 39'; Lescott 54' (o.g.); Biraghi 74'	MCFC report		Stadium: M&T Bank Stadium; Attendance: 36,569; Referee: Baldomero Toledo (United States)

Ferrostaal Cup, Summer of Champions

4 August 2010	Borussia Dortmund	3–1	Manchester City	Dortmund, Germany
19:00 BST	Barrios 9' (pen.); Kagawa 50'; Lewandowski 81'	MCFC report	Jô 11'	Stadium: Westfalenstadion; Attendance: 31,200; Referee: Guido Winkmann (Germany)

Friendly

7 August 2010	Manchester City	2–0	Valencia	Manchester, England
19:00 BST	Barry 28'; Jô 85'	MCFC report		Stadium: City of Manchester Stadium; Attendance: 27,088; Referee: Mark Clattenburg (England)

== Competitions ==
=== Premier League ===
==== League table ====
Pos	Team	Pld	W	D	L	GF	GA	GD	Pts	Qualification or relegation
1	Manchester United (C)	38	23	11	4	78	37	+41	80	Qualification for the Champions League group stage
2	Chelsea	38	21	8	9	69	33	+36	71	Qualification for the Champions League group stage
3	Manchester City	38	21	8	9	60	33	+27	71	Qualification for the Champions League group stage
4	Arsenal	38	19	11	8	72	43	+29	68	Qualification for the Champions League play-off round
5	Tottenham Hotspur	38	16	14	8	55	46	+9	62	Qualification for the Europa League play-off round

Source: Barclays Premier League
Rules for classification: 1) points; 2) goal difference; 3) number of goals scored.
(C) Champions

==== Results summary ====
Overall								Home						Away					
Pld	W	D	L	GF	GA	GD	Pts	W	D	L	GF	GA	GD	W	D	L	GF	GA	GD
38	21	8	9	60	33	+27	71	13	4	2	34	12	+22	8	4	7	26	21	+5

Last updated: 22 May 2011, end of season..
Source: MCFC official web site

==== Points breakdown ====
Points at home: 43
Points away from home: 28

Points against 2009/10 Top Four: 9
Points against promoted teams: 18

6 points: Blackpool, Bolton Wanderers, Newcastle United, West Bromwich Albion,

West Ham United, Wigan Athletic

4 points: Blackburn Rovers, Fulham, Stoke City, Tottenham Hotspur
3 points: Aston Villa, Chelsea, Liverpool, Sunderland, Wolverhampton Wanderers
2 points: Birmingham City
1 point: Arsenal, Manchester United
0 points: Everton

==== Biggest & smallest ====
Biggest home win: 5–0 vs. Sunderland, 3 April 2011
Biggest home defeat: 0–3 vs. Arsenal, 24 October 2010
Biggest away win: 1–4 vs. Fulham, November 2010
Biggest away defeat: 3–0 vs. Liverpool, 11 April 2011

Biggest home attendance: 47,393 vs. Arsenal, 24 October 2010
Smallest home attendance: 43,077 vs. Fulham, 27 February 2011
Biggest away attendance: 75,322 vs. Manchester United, 12 February 2011
Smallest away attendance: 15,525 vs. Wigan Athletic, 19 September 2010

==== Results by round ====
Round	1	2	3	4	5	6	7	8	9	10	11	12	13	14	15	16	17	18	19	20	21	22	23	24	25	26	27	28	29	30	31	32	33	34	35	36	37	38
Ground	A	H	A	H	A	H	H	A	H	A	A	H	H	A	A	H	A	H	A	H	H	A	H	A	A	H	A	H	H	A	H	A	A	H	A	H	H	A
Result	D	W	L	D	W	W	W	W	L	L	W	D	D	W	D	W	W	L	W	W	W	D	W	L	D	W	L	D	W	L	W	L	W	W	L	W	W	W
Position	11	4	9	8	4	4	2	2	4	4	4	4	4	4	4	4	3	3	3	2	2	2	2	3	3	3	3	3	3	4	3	4	4	4	4	4	3	3

Updated to match(es) played on 22 May 2011, end of season. Source: Premier League results
A = Away; H = Home; W = Win; D = Draw; L = Loss

==== Matches ====
14 August 2010 1	Tottenham Hotspur	0–0	Manchester City	London
12:45 BST		BBC Sport report Guardian report	Kompany (yellow card) 24'; Zabaleta (yellow card) 60'	Stadium: White Hart Lane; Attendance: 35,928; Referee: Andre Marriner

23 August 2010 2	Manchester City	3–0	Liverpool	Manchester
20:00 BST	Barry 13'; Tevez 52', 68' (pen.)	BBC Sport report Guardian report		Stadium: City of Manchester Stadium; Attendance: 47,087; Referee: Phil Dowd

29 August 2010 3	Sunderland	1–0	Manchester City	Sunderland
15:00 BST	Bent 90+4' (pen.)	BBC Sport report Guardian report		Stadium: Stadium of Light; Attendance: 38,610; Referee: Mike Dean

11 September 2010 4	Manchester City	1–1	Blackburn Rovers	Manchester
15:00 BST	Vieira 55'	BBC Sport report Guardian report	Kalinić 25'	Stadium: City of Manchester Stadium; Attendance: 44,246; Referee: Mark Clattenburg

19 September 2010 5	Wigan Athletic	0–2	Manchester City	Wigan
15:00 BST		BBC Sport report Guardian report	Tevez 43'; Y. Touré 70'	Stadium: DW Stadium; Attendance: 15,525; Referee: Lee Probert

25 September 2010 6	Manchester City	1–0	Chelsea	Manchester
12:45 BST	Tevez 59'	BBC Sport report Guardian report		Stadium: City of Manchester Stadium; Attendance: 47,203; Referee: Andre Marriner

3 October 2010 7	Manchester City	2–1	Newcastle United	Manchester
13:30 BST	Tevez 18' (pen.); A. Johnson 75'	BBC Sport report Guardian report	Gutiérrez 24'	Stadium: City of Manchester Stadium; Attendance: 46,067; Referee: Martin Atkinson

17 October 2010 8	Blackpool	2–3	Manchester City	Blackpool
16:00 BST	Harewood 78'; Taylor-Fletcher 90+3'	BBC Sport report Guardian report	Tevez 67', 79'; Silva 90'	Stadium: Bloomfield Road; Attendance: 16,116; Referee: Phil Dowd

24 October 2010 9	Manchester City	0–3	Arsenal	Manchester
16:00 BST	Boyata (red card) 5'; Barry (yellow card) 13'; Kompany (yellow card) 72'	BBC Sport report Guardian report	Denílson (yellow card) 8'; Nasri 20'; Fàbregas (yellow card) 28'; Song (yellow card) 33', (goal) 66'; Djourou (yellow card) 36'; Bendtner 88'	Stadium: City of Manchester Stadium; Attendance: 47,393; Referee: Mark Clattenburg

30 October 2010 10	Wolverhampton Wanderers	2–1	Manchester City	Wolverhampton
15:00 BST	Milijaš 30'; Edwards 57'	BBC Sport report Guardian report	Adebayor 23' (pen.)	Stadium: Molineux Stadium; Attendance: 25,971; Referee: Mike Dean

7 November 2010 11	West Bromwich Albion	0–2	Manchester City	West Bromwich
15:00 GMT		BBC Sport report Guardian report	Balotelli 20', 26'	Stadium: The Hawthorns; Attendance: 23,013; Referee: Lee Probert

10 November 2010 12	Manchester City	0–0	Manchester United	Manchester
20:00 GMT		BBC Sport report Guardian report		Stadium: City of Manchester Stadium; Attendance: 47,210; Referee: Chris Foy

13 November 2010 13	Manchester City	0–0	Birmingham City	Manchester
15:00 GMT		BBC Sport report Guardian report		Stadium: City of Manchester Stadium; Attendance: 44,321; Referee: Mike Jones

21 November 2010 14	Fulham	1–4	Manchester City	London
16:00 GMT	Gera 70'	BBC Sport report Guardian report	Tevez 6', 56'; Zabaleta 32'; Y. Touré 35'	Stadium: Craven Cottage; Attendance: 25,694; Referee: Lee Mason

27 November 2010 15	Stoke City	1–1	Manchester City	Stoke-on-Trent
15:00 GMT	Etherington 90'	BBC Sport report Guardian report	Richards 81'	Stadium: Britannia Stadium; Attendance: 27,405; Referee: Peter Walton

4 December 2010 16	Manchester City	1–0	Bolton Wanderers	Manchester
15:00 GMT	Tevez 4'	BBC Sport report Guardian report		Stadium: City of Manchester Stadium; Attendance: 46,860; Referee: Andre Marriner

11 December 2010 17	West Ham United	1–3	Manchester City	London
15:00 GMT	Tomkins 89'	BBC Sport report Guardian report	Y. Touré 30'; Y. Touré 73'; A. Johnson 81'	Stadium: Boleyn Ground; Attendance: 32,813; Referee: Phil Dowd

20 December 2010 18	Manchester City	1–2	Everton	Manchester
20:00 GMT	Y. Touré 72'	BBC Sport report Guardian report	T. Cahill 4'; Baines 19'	Stadium: City of Manchester Stadium; Attendance: 45,028; Referee: Peter Walton

26 December 2010 19	Newcastle United	1–3	Manchester City	Newcastle upon Tyne
15:00 GMT	Carroll 72'	BBC Sport report Guardian report	Barry 2'; Tevez 5'; Coloccini 81' (o.g.)	Stadium: St James' Park; Attendance: 51,635; Referee: Chris Foy

28 December 2010 20	Manchester City	4–0	Aston Villa	Manchester
15:00 GMT	Balotelli 8' (pen.), 27', 55' (pen.); Lescott 13'	BBC Sport report Guardian report		Stadium: City of Manchester Stadium; Attendance: 46,716; Referee: Michael Oliver

1 January 2011 21	Manchester City	1–0	Blackpool	Manchester
15:00 GMT	A. Johnson 34'	BBC Sport report Guardian report		Stadium: City of Manchester Stadium; Attendance: 47,296; Referee: Mark Clattenburg

5 January 2011 22	Arsenal	0–0	Manchester City	London
19:45 GMT		BBC Sport report Guardian report		Stadium: Emirates Stadium; Attendance: 60,085; Referee: Mike Jones

15 January 2011 23	Manchester City	4–3	Wolverhampton Wanderers	Manchester
15:00 GMT	K. Touré 40'; Tevez 49', 66'; Y. Touré 54'	BBC Sport report Guardian report	Milijaš 12'; Doyle 68' (pen.); Zubar 86'	Stadium: City of Manchester Stadium; Attendance: 46,672; Referee: Lee Mason

22 January 2011 24	Aston Villa	1–0	Manchester City	Birmingham
17:30 GMT	Bent 18'	BBC Sport report Guardian report		Stadium: Villa Park; Attendance: 37,315; Referee: Howard Webb

2 February 2011 25	Birmingham City	2–2	Manchester City	Birmingham
19:45 GMT	Žigić 23'; Gardner 77' (pen.)	BBC Sport report Guardian report	Tevez 4'; Kolarov 41'	Stadium: St Andrew's; Attendance: 24,379; Referee: Kevin Friend

5 February 2011 26	Manchester City	3–0	West Bromwich Albion	Manchester
15:00 GMT	Tevez 17' (pen.), 22', 39' (pen.)	BBC Sport report Guardian report		Stadium: City of Manchester Stadium; Attendance: 46,846; Referee: Martin Atkinson

12 February 2011 27	Manchester United	2–1	Manchester City	Manchester
12:45 GMT	Nani 41'; Rooney 78'	BBC Sport report Observer report Guardian report	Silva 65'	Stadium: Old Trafford; Attendance: 75,322; Referee: Andre Marriner

27 February 2011 28	Manchester City	1–1	Fulham	Manchester
15:00 GMT	Balotelli 26'	BBC Sport report Guardian report	Duff 48'	Stadium: City of Manchester Stadium; Attendance: 43,077; Referee: Peter Walton

5 March 2011 29	Manchester City	1–0	Wigan Athletic	Manchester
17:30 GMT	Silva 38'	BBC Sport report Guardian report		Stadium: City of Manchester Stadium; Attendance: 44,864; Referee: Stuart Attwell

20 March 2011 30	Chelsea	2–0	Manchester City	London
16:00 GMT	David Luiz 79'; Ramires 90'	BBC Sport report Guardian report		Stadium: Stamford Bridge; Attendance: 41,741; Referee: Chris Foy

3 April 2011 31	Manchester City	5–0	Sunderland	Manchester
16:00 BST	A. Johnson 9'; Tevez 15' (pen.); Silva 63'; Vieira 67'; Y. Touré 73'	BBC Sport report Guardian report		Stadium: City of Manchester Stadium; Attendance: 44,197; Referee: Howard Webb

11 April 2011 32	Liverpool	3–0	Manchester City	Liverpool
20:00 BST	Carroll 13', 35'; Kuyt 34'	BBC Sport Report		Stadium: Anfield; Attendance: 44,776; Referee: Mark Halsey

25 April 2011 33	Blackburn Rovers	0–1	Manchester City	Blackburn
20:00 BST		BBC Sport report	Džeko 75'	Stadium: Ewood Park; Attendance: 23,529; Referee: Andre Marriner

1 May 2011 34	Manchester City	2–1	West Ham United	Manchester
16:10 BST	De Jong 10'; Zabaleta 15'	BBC Sport report	Ba 33'	Stadium: City of Manchester Stadium; Attendance: 44,511; Referee: Howard Webb

7 May 2011 35	Everton	2–1	Manchester City	Liverpool
15:00 BST	Distin 65'; Osman 72'	BBC Sport report	Y. Touré 28'	Stadium: Goodison Park; Attendance: 37,351; Referee: Phil Dowd

10 May 2011 36	Manchester City	1–0	Tottenham Hotspur	Manchester
19:45 BST	Crouch 30' (o.g.)	BBC Sport report		Stadium: City of Manchester Stadium; Attendance: 47,029; Referee: Mike Dean

17 May 2011 37	Manchester City	3–0	Stoke City	Manchester
19:45 BST	Tevez 14', 65'; Lescott 53'	BBC Sport report		Stadium: City of Manchester Stadium; Attendance: 45,103; Referee: Lee Probert

22 May 2011 38	Bolton Wanderers	0–2	Manchester City	Bolton
16:00 BST		BBC Sport report	Lescott 43'; Džeko 62'	Stadium: Reebok Stadium; Attendance: 26,285; Referee: Chris Foy

=== FA Cup ===
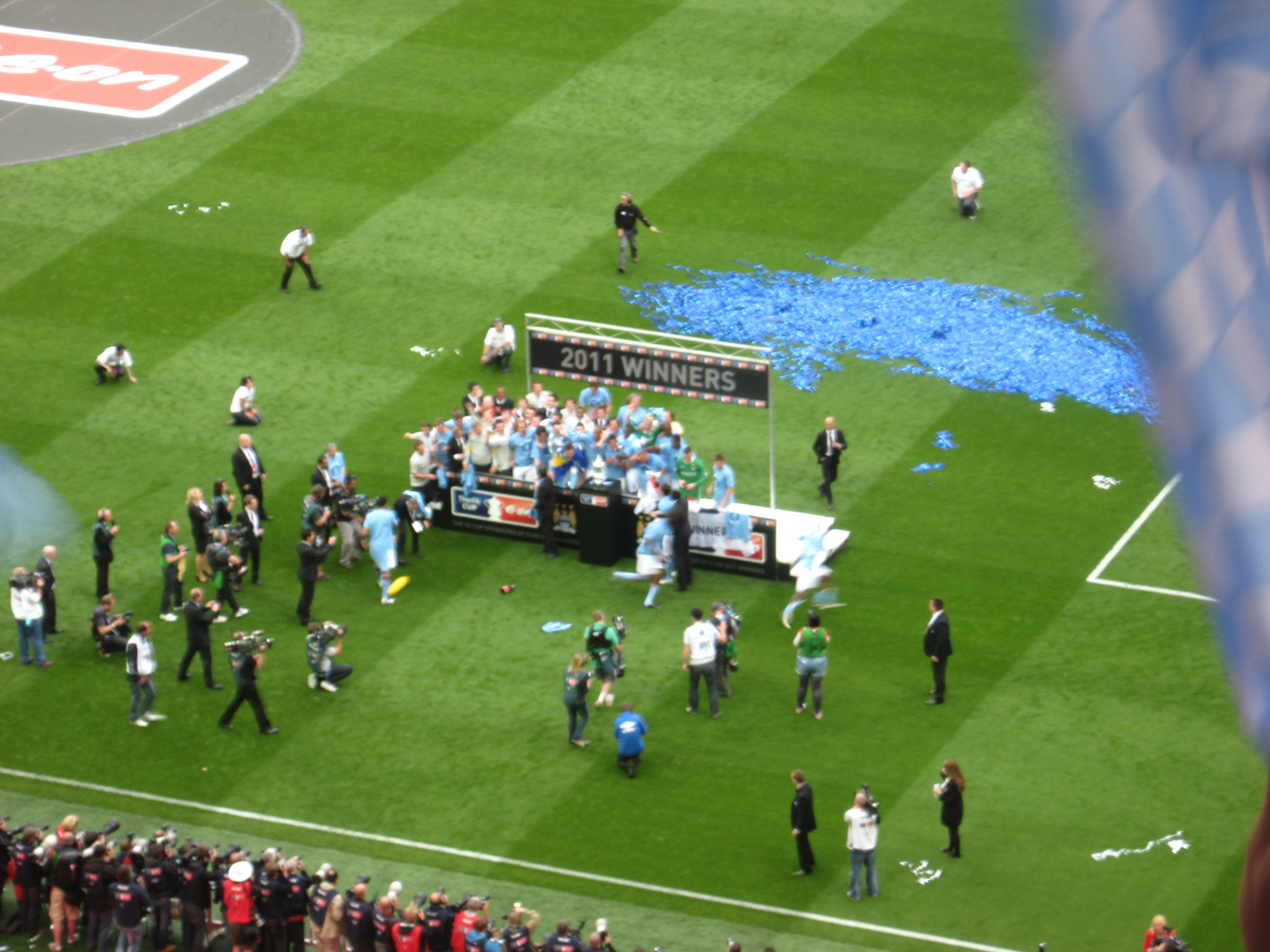
Manchester City players celebrating their triumph in the 2011 FA Cup final

9 January 2011 Third round	Leicester City	2–2	Manchester City	Leicester
16:00 GMT	Bamba 1'; King 64'	BBC Sport report Guardian report	Milner 23'; Tevez 45'	Stadium: Walkers Stadium; Attendance: 31,200; Referee: Mike Dean

18 January 2011 Third round Replay	Manchester City	4–2	Leicester City	Manchester
19.45 GMT	Tevez 15'; Vieira 37'; A. Johnson 38'; Kolarov 90'	BBC Sport report Guardian report	Gallagher 19' (pen.); Dyer 83'	Stadium: City of Manchester Stadium; Attendance: 27,755; Referee: Mark Halsey

30 January 2011 Fourth round	Notts County	1–1	Manchester City	Nottingham
14:00 GMT	Bishop 59'	BBC Sport report Guardian report	Džeko 80'	Stadium: Meadow Lane; Attendance: 16,587; Referee: Chris Foy

20 February 2011 Fourth round Replay	Manchester City	5–0	Notts County	Manchester
14:00 GMT	Vieira 37', 58'; Tevez 84'; Džeko 89'; Richards 90+1'	BBC Sport report Guardian report		Stadium: City of Manchester Stadium; Attendance: 27,276; Referee: Mike Jones

2 March 2011 Fifth Round	Manchester City	3–0	Aston Villa	Manchester
19:45 GMT	Y. Touré 5'; Balotelli 25'; Silva 70'	BBC Sport report Guardian report		Stadium: City of Manchester Stadium; Attendance: 25,570; Referee: Mark Clattenburg

13 March 2011 Quarter-final	Manchester City	1–0	Reading	Manchester
16:45 GMT	Richards 74'	BBC Sport report Guardian report		Stadium: City of Manchester Stadium; Attendance: 41,150; Referee: Lee Probert

16 April 2011 Semi-final	Manchester City	1–0	Manchester United	London
17:15 BST	Y. Touré 52'	BBC Sport report		Stadium: Wembley Stadium; Attendance: 86,549; Referee: Mike Dean

14 May 2011 Final	Manchester City	1–0	Stoke City	London
15:00 BST	Y. Touré 74'	BBC Sport report		Stadium: Wembley Stadium; Attendance: 88,643; Referee: Martin Atkinson

=== League Cup ===
22 September 2010 Third round	West Bromwich Albion	2–1	Manchester City	West Bromwich
20:00 BST	Zuiverloon 55'; Cox 57'	BBC Sport report Guardian report	Jô 19'	Stadium: The Hawthorns; Attendance: 10,418; Referee: Neil Swarbrick

=== UEFA Europa League ===
==== Play-off round ====
19 August 2010 First Leg	Timișoara (Romania)	0–1	(England) Manchester City	Timișoara, Romania
20:00 CET		UEFA report BBC Sport report	Balotelli 72'	Stadium: Dan Păltinișanu Stadium; Attendance: 20,000; Referee: Florian Meyer (Germany)

26 August 2010 Second Leg	Manchester City (England)	2–0	(Romania) Timișoara	Manchester, England
19:45 CET	Wright-Phillips 43'; Boyata 59'	UEFA report BBC Sport report		Stadium: City of Manchester Stadium; Attendance: 23,542; Referee: Jorge de Sousa (Portugal)

==== Group stage ====
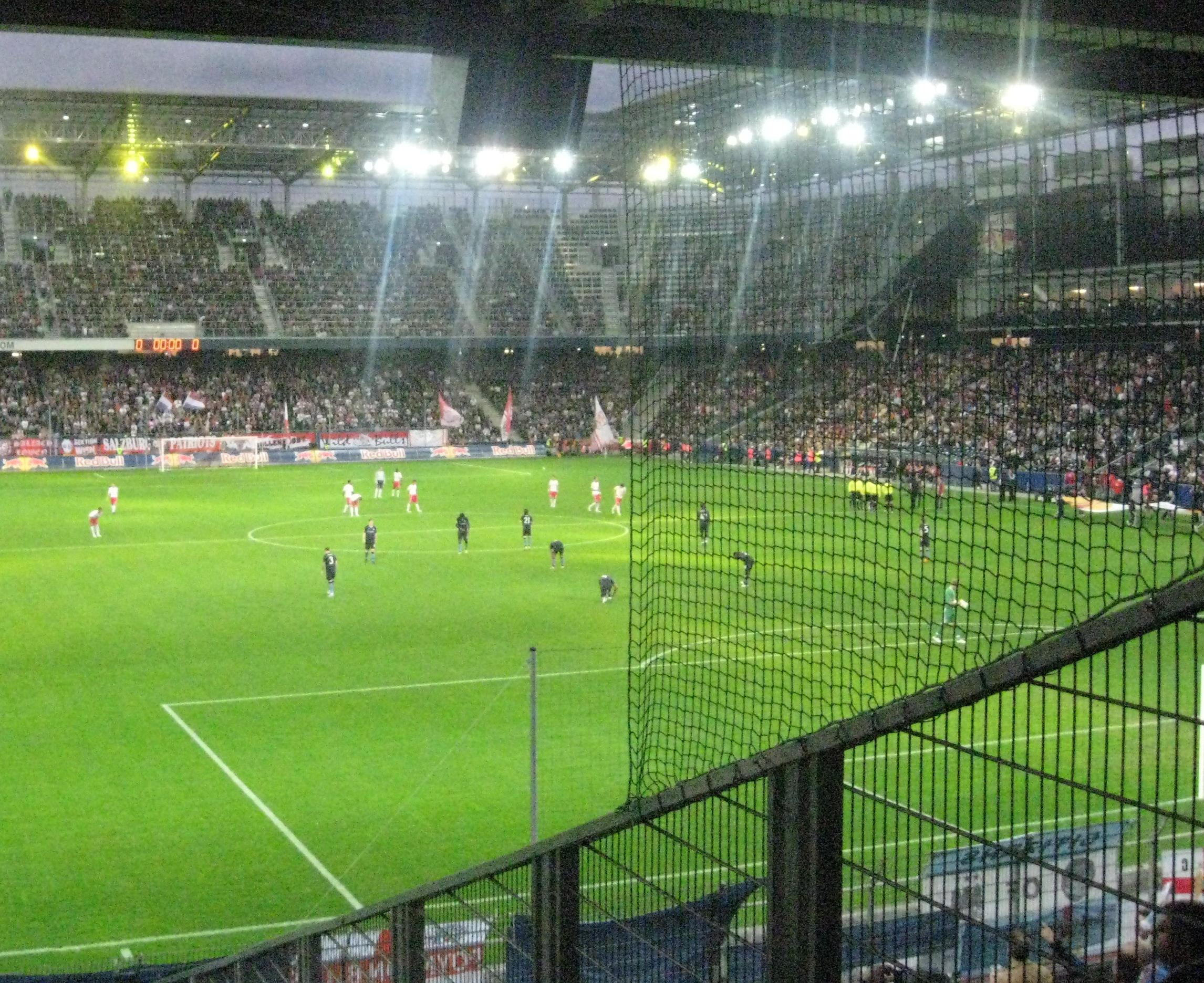
Manchester City prepare to kick off their opening Europa League group fixture vs. Red Bull Salzburg

Pos	Team	Pld	W	D	L	GF	GA	GD	Pts	Qualification
1	(England) Manchester City	6	3	2	1	11	6	+5	11	Advance to knockout phase
2	(Poland) Lech Poznań	6	3	2	1	11	8	+3	11	Advance to knockout phase
3	(Italy) Juventus	6	0	6	0	7	7	0	6	
4	(Austria) Red Bull Salzburg	6	0	2	4	1	9	−8	2	

Source: Soccerway

16 September 2010 1	Red Bull Salzburg (Austria)	0–2	(England) Manchester City	Wals-Siezenheim, Austria
19:00 CET		UEFA report BBC Sport report	Silva 8'; Jô 63'	Stadium: Red Bull Arena; Attendance: 25,100; Referee: Georgios Daloukas (Greece)

30 September 2010 2	Manchester City (England)	1–1	(Italy) Juventus	Manchester, England
21:05 CET	A. Johnson 37'	UEFA report BBC Sport report	Iaquinta 10'	Stadium: City of Manchester Stadium; Attendance: 35,212; Referee: Eduardo González (Spain)

21 October 2010 3	Manchester City (England)	3–1	(Poland) Lech Poznań	Manchester, England
21:05 CET	Adebayor 13', 25', 73'	UEFA report BBC Sport report	Tshibamba 50'	Stadium: City of Manchester Stadium; Attendance: 33,383; Referee: Alexandru Tudor (Romania)

4 November 2010 4	Lech Poznań (Poland)	3–1	(England) Manchester City	Poznań, Poland
19:00 CET	Injac 30'; Arboleda 86'; Możdżeń 90+1'	UEFA report BBC Sport report	Adebayor 51'	Stadium: Stadion Miejski; Attendance: 43,000; Referee: Pieter Vink (Netherlands)

1 December 2010 5	Manchester City (England)	3–0	(Austria) Red Bull Salzburg	Manchester, England
21:05 CET	Balotelli 18', 65'; A. Johnson 78'	UEFA report BBC Sport report		Stadium: City of Manchester Stadium; Attendance: 37,552; Referee: Libor Kovařík (Czech Republic)

16 December 2010 6	Juventus (Italy)	1–1	(England) Manchester City	Turin, Italy
19:00 CET	Giannetti 43'	UEFA report BBC Sport report	Jô 76'	Stadium: Stadio Olimpico di Torino; Attendance: 6,992; Referee: István Vad (Hungary)

Last updated: 16 December 2010.
Source: UEFA Europa League 2010–11 match reports

==== Knockout phase ====
===== Round of 32 =====
15 February 2011 First Leg	Aris (Greece)	0–0	(England) Manchester City	Salonika, Greece
18:00 CET		UEFA report BBC Sport report		Stadium: Kleánthis Vikelídis Stadium; Attendance: 21,000; Referee: Alberto Undiano Mallenco (Spain)

24 February 2011 Second Leg	Manchester City (England)	3–0 (3–0 agg.)	(Greece) Aris	Manchester, England
21:05 CET	Džeko 7', 12'; Y. Touré 75'	UEFA report BBC Sport report		Stadium: City of Manchester Stadium; Attendance: 36,748; Referee: Pavel Kralovec (Czech Republic)

===== Round of 16 =====
10 March 2011 First Leg	Dynamo Kyiv (Ukraine)	2–0	(England) Manchester City	Kyiv, Ukraine
21:05 CET	Shevchenko 25'; Husyev 77'	UEFA report BBC Sport report		Stadium: Lobanovsky Dynamo Stadium; Attendance: 16,000; Referee: Florian Meyer (Germany)

17 March 2011 Second Leg	Manchester City (England)	1–0 (1–2 agg.)	(Ukraine) Dynamo Kyiv	Manchester, England
19:00 CET	Kolarov 39'	UEFA report BBC Sport report		Stadium: City of Manchester Stadium; Attendance: 27,816; Referee: Cüneyt Çakır (Turkey)

== Squad information ==
=== Playing statistics ===
Appearances (Apps) numbers are for appearances in competitive games only, including sub appearances.
Red card numbers denote: numbers in parentheses represent red cards overturned for wrongful dismissal.

No.	Nat.	Player	Pos.	Premier League				Europa League				FA Cup				League Cup				Total			
No.	Nat.	Player	Pos.	Apps	Goal	Yellow card	Red card	Apps	Goal	Yellow card	Red card	Apps	Goal	Yellow card	Red card	Apps	Goal	Yellow card	Red card	Apps	Goal	Yellow card	Red card
1	(Republic of Ireland)	Shay Given	GK					3								1				4			
2	(England)	Micah Richards	DF	18	1	4		8		1		5	2	1						31	3	6	
3	(England)	Wayne Bridge	DF	3				4		1										7		1	
4	(Belgium)	Vincent Kompany	DF	37		6		8		1		5		2						50		9	
5	(Argentina)	Pablo Zabaleta	DF	26	2	8	1	11		1		7		1		1				43	2	10	1
7	(England)	James Milner	MF	32		4		5				3	1	1		1				41	1	5	
8	(England)	Shaun Wright-Phillips	MF	7				9	1			3								19	1		
9	(Togo)	Emmanuel Adebayor	FW	8	1			6	4											14	5		
10	(Bosnia and Herzegovina)	Edin Džeko	FW	15	2			4	2	1		2	2							21	6	1	
11	(England)	Adam Johnson	MF	31	4	2		7	2			4	1			1				43	7	2	
12	(England)	Stuart Taylor	GK																				
13	(Serbia)	Aleksandar Kolarov	DF	24	1	6	1	5	1	1		8	1			1				43	7	1	1
14	(Paraguay)	Roque Santa Cruz	FW	1												1				2			
17	(Germany)	Jérôme Boateng	DF	16		1		5				3								24		1	
18	(England)	Gareth Barry	MF	33	2	8		7		1		7								47	2	9	
19	(England)	Joleon Lescott	DF	22	3	1		7				8								37	3	1	
21	(Spain)	David Silva	MF	35	4	2		10	1	1		7	1			1				53	6	3	
22	(Republic of Ireland)	Greg Cunningham	MF					1								1				2			
24	(France)	Patrick Vieira	DF	15	2	2		8				8	3	1		1		1		32	5	4	
25	(England)	Joe Hart	GK	38		1		9				8								55		1	
27	(Brazil)	Jô	FW	12				6	2			5				1	1			24	3		
28	(Ivory Coast)	Kolo Touré	DF	22	1	4	1	5		1		2								29	1	5	1
32	(Argentina)	Carlos Tevez	FW	31	20	6		7		2		6	3							44	24	8	
34	(Netherlands)	Nigel de Jong	MF	32	1	9		5		1		4		1						41	1	11	
36	(England)	Javan Vidal	DF													1		1		1		1	
38	(Belgium)	Dedryck Boyata	DF	7		1	1	6	1			2				1				16	1	1	1
41	(England)	Ben Mee	DF													1				1			
42	(Ivory Coast)	Yaya Touré	MF	35	8	3		8	1	1		7	3			1				50	12	4	
43	(England)	Alex Nimely	FW					1												1			
45	(Italy)	Mario Balotelli	FW	17	6	6	1	6	3	2	1	5	1	3						28	10	11	2
48	(Northern Ireland)	Ryan McGivern	DF	1																1			
50	(Norway)	Abdisalam Ibrahim	FW													1				1			
53	(England)	Chris Chantler	MF					1												1			
57	(England)	Reece Wabara	DF	1																1			
60	(Sweden)	John Guidetti	FW													1				1			
62	(Ivory Coast)	Abdul Razak	MF	1																1			
Own goals					3				0				0				0				0		
Totals					60	74	5		18	15	1		18	10	0		1	2	0		96	99	6

=== Goalscorers ===
Includes all competitive matches. The list is sorted alphabetically by surname when total goals are equal.

No.	Nat.	Player	Pos.	Premier League	Europa League	FA Cup	League Cup	TOTAL
32	(Argentina)	Carlos Tevez	FW	20	0	3	0	23
42	(Ivory Coast)	Yaya Touré	MF	8	1	3	0	12
45	(Italy)	Mario Balotelli	FW	6	3	1	0	10
11	(England)	Adam Johnson	MF	4	2	1	0	7
10	(Bosnia and Herzegovina)	Edin Džeko	FW	2	2	2	0	6
21	(Spain)	David Silva	FW	4	1	1	0	6
25	(Togo)	Emmanuel Adebayor	FW	1	4	0	0	5
24	(France)	Patrick Vieira	DF	2	0	3	0	5
27	(Brazil)	Jô	FW	0	2	0	1	3
13	(Serbia)	Aleksandar Kolarov	DF	1	1	1	0	3
19	(England)	Joleon Lescott	DF	3	0	0	0	3
2	(England)	Micah Richards	DF	1	0	2	0	3
18	(England)	Gareth Barry	MF	2	0	0	0	2
5	(Argentina)	Pablo Zabaleta	DF	2	0	0	0	2
38	(Belgium)	Dedryck Boyata	DF	0	1	0	0	1
34	(Netherlands)	Nigel de Jong	MF	1	0	0	0	1
7	(England)	James Milner	MF	0	0	1	0	1
28	(Ivory Coast)	Kolo Touré	MF	1	0	0	0	1
8	(England)	Shaun Wright-Phillips	MF	0	1	0	0	1
Own goals				2	0	0	0	2
Totals				60	18	18	1	97

== Awards ==
=== Premier League Manager of the Month award ===
Awarded monthly to the manager that was chosen by a panel assembled by the Premier League's sponsor.

Month	Manager
December	(Italy) Roberto Mancini

=== Premier League Golden Boot award ===
Awarded to the player who scored the most goals in the 2010–11 Premier League season.

Player	Goals
(Argentina) Carlos Tevez	20*

(*shared with Manchester United's Dimitar Berbatov)

=== Barclays Golden Glove award ===
Awarded to the goalkeeper who kept the most clean sheets over the 2010–11 Premier League season.

Player	Clean sheets
(England) Joe Hart	18

=== PFA Team of the Year ===
The combined best 11 from all teams in the Premier League chosen by the PFA.

Player	Position
(Belgium) Vincent Kompany	Defence
(Argentina) Carlos Tevez	Attack

=== Etihad / OSC Player of the Year awards ===
Player/Event/Organisation	2010–11 season awards	Notes
(Belgium) Vincent Kompany	OSC Player of the Year	OSC = Official Supporters Club
(Italy) Mario Balotelli	OSC Young Player of the Year	OSC = Official Supporters Club
(Belgium) Vincent Kompany	Jaguar Players' Player of the Year	
(Argentina) Carlos Tevez	Goal of the Season	Manchester City 3 – 0 Stoke City; 17 May 2011 (65th-minute goal)
(England) Joe Hart	Performance of the Season	Tottenham Hotspur 0 – 0 Manchester City; 14 August 2010
FA Cup victory	Moment of the season	
(France) Patrick Vieira	CITC Player of the Year	CITC = City in the Community
Manchester City Supporters Club	CITC Partner of the Year	CITC = City in the Community
Lee Jackson	Outstanding contribution	Awarded to club Head Groundsman

=== Etihad Player of the Month awards ===
Awarded to the player that receives the most votes in a poll conducted each month on the official website of Manchester City.

Month	Player
August	(England) Joe Hart
September	(Belgium) Vincent Kompany
October	(Spain) David Silva
November	(Spain) David Silva
December	(Spain) David Silva
January	(Bosnia and Herzegovina) Edin Džeko
February	(England) Micah Richards
March	(Belgium) Vincent Kompany
April	(Ivory Coast) Yaya Touré

=== Tuttosport Golden Boy award ===
Awarded annually since 2003 by the Italian daily sports newspaper to the young player (on an initial short list of 40 'under 21' players) that receives the most votes from a panel consisting of 30 sports journalists selected from across the whole of Europe.

Year	Player
2010	(Italy) Mario Balotelli

=== Best Groundsmen of the Year award ===
Awarded annually at a meeting of the Institute of Groundsmanship organisation as a result of voting by professional football grounds management teams from the whole of the UK.

Year	Professional Grounds Management Team of the Year		
Year	Grounds staff	Club	Stadium
2010	Roy Rigby and staff	Manchester City	CoMS

== Transfers and loans ==
=== Transfers in ===
First team
Date	Pos.	Player	From club	Transfer fee
1 July 2010	DF	(Germany) Jérôme Boateng	(Germany) Hamburger SV	£10,000,000
2 July 2010	MF	(Ivory Coast) Yaya Touré	(Spain) Barcelona	£24,000,000
14 July 2010	MF	(Spain) David Silva	(Spain) Valencia	£24,000,000
24 July 2010	DF	(Serbia) Aleksandar Kolarov	(Italy) Lazio	£16,000,000
13 Aug. 2010	FW	(Italy) Mario Balotelli	(Italy) Inter Milan	£24,000,000
18 Aug. 2010	MF	(England) James Milner	(England) Aston Villa	£18,000,000 + p/x
7 Jan. 2011	FW	(Bosnia and Herzegovina) Edin Džeko	(Germany) VfL Wolfsburg	£27,000,000

Reserves and Academy
Date	Pos.	Player	From club	Transfer fee
10 June 2010	MF	(England) Alex Henshall	(England) Swindon Town	£250,000
7 July 2010	MF	(Slovakia) Albert Rusnák	(Slovakia) MFK Košice	Undisc.
31 Aug. 2010	MF	(Ghana) Mohammed Abu	(Ghana) Sporting Club Accra	Undisc.
Nov. 2010	MF	(Italy) Andrea Mancini	(Italy) Bologna	Free agent
13 Dec. 2010	FW	(Israel) Gai Assulin	(Spain) Barcelona	Free agent

=== Transfers out ===
First team
Exit Date	Pos.	Player	To club	Transfer fee
8 June 2010	FW	(Zimbabwe) Benjani	(England) Blackburn Rovers	Released
22 June 2010	MF	(Bulgaria) Martin Petrov	(England) Bolton Wanderers	Free
5 July 2010	FW	(Bulgaria) Valeri Bojinov	(Italy) Parma	£3,000,000
29 July 2010	DF	(Brazil) Sylvinho	Released as free agent	
30 July 2010	DF	(Spain) Javier Garrido	(Italy) Lazio	£2,500,000
18 Aug. 2010	MF	(Republic of Ireland) Stephen Ireland	(England) Aston Villa	Player exch.
31 Aug. 2010	FW	(Brazil) Robinho	(Italy) AC Milan	£15,000,000+
19 Jan. 2011	MF	(Nigeria) Kelvin Etuhu	Released as free agent	

Reserves and Academy
Exit Date	Pos.	Player	To club	Transfer fee
17 May 2010	MF	(Northern Ireland) Andrew Mitchell	(Scotland) Rangers	Free
8 June 2010	MF	(Republic of Ireland) Karl Moore	(Republic of Ireland) UCD AFC	Released
11 June 2010	FW	(Slovakia) Róbert Mak	(Germany) 1. FC Nürnberg	Undisc.
12 June 2010	GK	(Norway) Tobias Johansen	(Norway) Kongsvinger	Free
15 June 2010	MF	(England) Paul Marshall	(England) Walsall	Free
30 June 2010	FW	(England) Jack Redshaw	(England) Rochdale	Free
8 July 2010	GK	(Slovakia) Filip Mentel	(Scotland) Dundee United	Free
31 Aug. 2010	MF	(England) Adam Clayton	(England) Leeds United	Undisc.
31 Jan. 2011	FW	(England) David Ball	(England) Peterborough United	Undisc.

=== Loans out ===
First team
Start date	End date	Pos	Player	To club
21 July 10	3 Jan. 11	GK	(Faroe Islands) Gunnar Nielsen	(England) Tranmere Rovers
11 Aug. 10	31 May 11	DF	(England) Nedum Onuoha	(England) Sunderland
17 Aug. 10	31 May 11	FW	(Wales) Craig Bellamy	(Wales) Cardiff City
19 Aug. 10	31 May 11	MF	(Slovakia) Vladimír Weiss	(Scotland) Rangers
31 Aug. 10	31 May 11	FW	(Ecuador) Felipe Caicedo	(Spain) Levante
21 Oct. 10	1 Jan. 11	DF	(Republic of Ireland) Greg Cunningham	(England) Leicester City
12 Jan. 11	31 May 11	DF	(England) Wayne Bridge	(England) West Ham United
14 Jan. 11	31 May 11	FW	(Paraguay) Roque Santa Cruz	(England) Blackburn Rovers
14 Jan. 11	31 May 11	MF	(Norway) Abdisalam Ibrahim	(England) Scunthorpe United
20 Jan. 11	26 Feb. 11	DF	(England) Javan Vidal	(England) Chesterfield
26 Jan. 11	31 May 11	FW	(Togo) Emmanuel Adebayor	(Spain) Real Madrid
31 Jan. 11	31 May 11	GK	(Colombia) David González	(England) Leeds United

Reserves and Academy
Start date	End date	Pos	Player	To club
13 July 10	12 Jan. 11	FW	(England) David Ball	(England) Swindon Town
30 July 10	15 Jan. 11	DF	(Northern Ireland) Ryan McGivern	(England) Walsall
6 Aug. 10	31 Aug. 10	MF	(England) Adam Clayton	(England) Leeds United
7 Aug. 10	31 May 11	DF	(England) Kieran Trippier	(England) Barnsley
9 Aug. 10	8 Nov. 10	MF	(England) Andrew Tutte	(England) Rochdale
31 Aug. 10	30 June 11	MF	(Ghana) Mohammed Abu	(Norway) Strømsgodset
12 Oct. 10	2 Dec. 10	FW	(England) James Poole	(England) Hartlepool United
25 Nov. 10	3 Jan. 11	FW	(Sweden) John Guidetti	(England) Burnley
25 Nov. 10	3 Jan. 11	MF	(England) Andrew Tutte	(England) Shrewsbury Town
1 Jan. 11	31 May 11	DF	(England) Ben Mee	(England) Leicester City
31 Jan. 11	31 May 11	MF	(England) Andrew Tutte	(England) Yeovil Town
24 Mar. 11	31 May 11	MF	(Republic of Ireland) Donal McDermott	(England) AFC Bournemouth

This 'loan watch' report provided the latest progress update on most of the players listed above that were out on loan at other clubs.
