= The Priory Grammar School for Boys, Shrewsbury =

Priory Grammar School for Boys, Shrewsbury
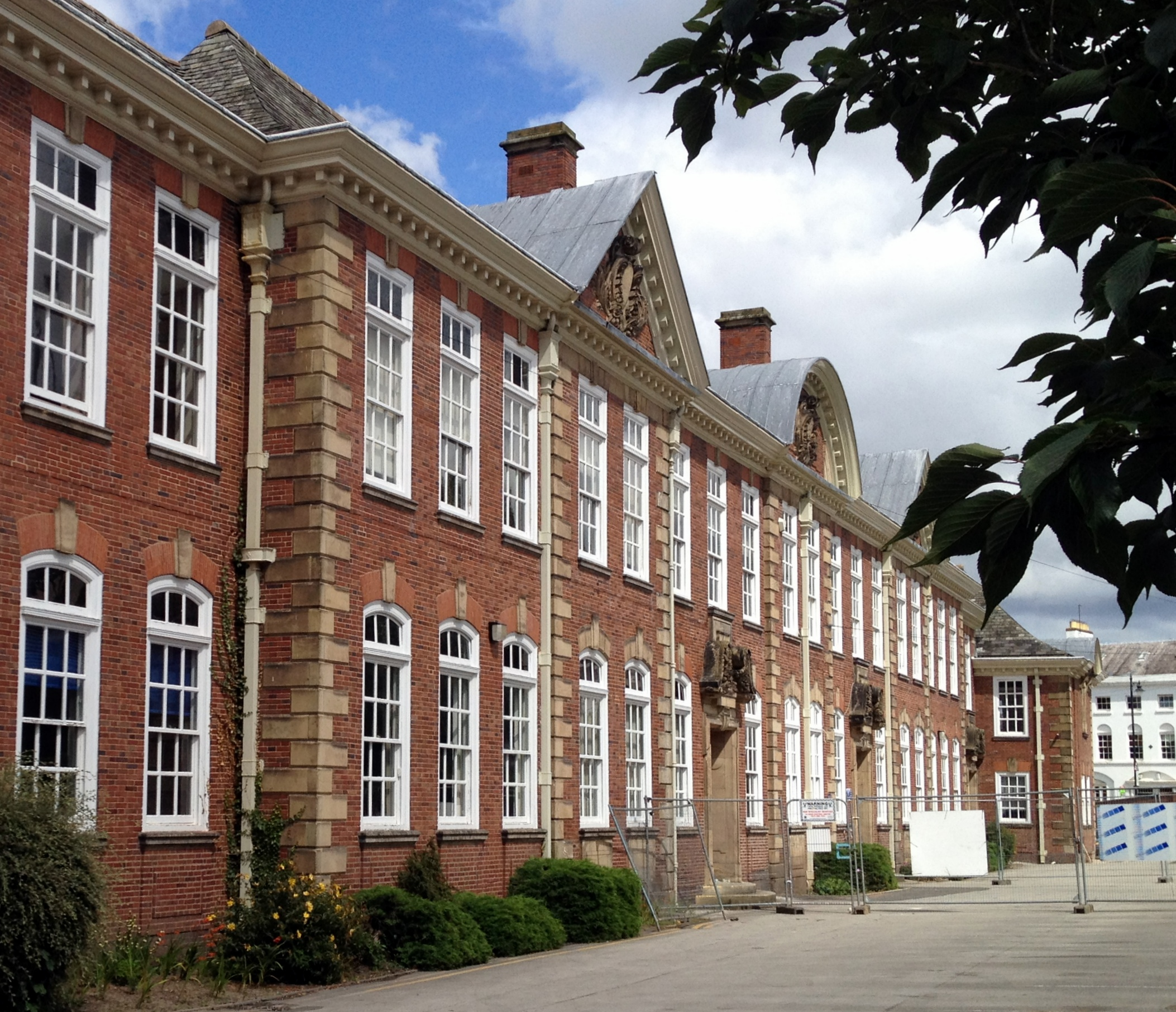

Information
- Type: Grammar School
- Established: 1910
- Closed: 1983

The Priory Grammar School for Boys was a maintained (state-funded) grammar school for boys located in Shrewsbury, the county town of Shropshire, England. It was established in 1910 and the last grammar school students left in 1983.

== History ==
The Priory Grammar School for Boys was established in 1910 in what are now buildings of Grade II-listed status, located on the site of a medieval Augustinian friary near the Welsh Bridge. The school was originally named The Priory County School and had separate sections for boys and girls. Many changes to the school's subsequent organization were caused by wartime requirements.

A.R. Florian was the first headmaster of the school. A biographical article on John Lewis Paton (Headmaster of Manchester Grammar School) records Florian as having been a teacher at Manchester before moving to Shrewsbury.

The school played a part in the First World War with cadet training. An announcement in 1915 records "The following have been appointed to Cadet Commissions in various companies of the 1st Cadet Battalion, 4th KSLI; No 6 Co.: Priory School, Shrewsbury; A R Florian, Captain; R S H Richards, Lieutenant". Eleven old boys of the new school lost their lives serving in the war, commemorated by a war memorial plaque at the school.

A portrait of life at the school around 1950 was written by Graham Brown. Later, in the 1950s and 60s a strong interest in archaeology was fostered by Philip A. Barker when he was Art master at the school, and many boys took part in excavations at sites such as the local Roman city of Uriconium, Roushill in Shrewsbury and Hen Domen.

While the school taught all the usual academic subjects, the subject of Classics was given special emphasis during the headship of C.W.E. Peckett after the Second World War. Introductory Latin was introduced at second-year level and was taught by the direct method, using conversation in which little or no English was allowed. The method was demonstrated (using junior pupils from the school) at some of the annual meetings of The Association for the Reform of Latin Teaching. Together with A.R. Munday, Peckett published a number of books for learners of Latin, the best-known being Pseudolus Noster and Principia. Peckett and Munday also collaborated on an introductory course in Ancient Greek. The Latin motto of the school was Possunt quia posse videntur ("They can because they think they can").

In 1983 the Priory Grammar School for Boys ceased to exist, as grammar schools selecting pupils on the basis of the Eleven-plus examination in the Tripartite System of education in England, Wales and Northern Ireland were phased out in favour of non-selective schools. The buildings were already shared with Shrewsbury Sixth Form College, founded in 1981, and the college now took over the entire premises.

The Priory Girls' Grammar School had been opened on a separate site on the outskirts of the town in 1939, and the buildings now contain a secondary school with academy status. It has retained the name of The Priory School, Shrewsbury and is part of the 3-18 Education Trust.

== Notable staff ==
- Philip A. Barker, archaeologist, was Art Master
- Sir Chris Woodhead, educationalist, later Her Majesty's Chief Inspector of Schools in England, taught here 1969-1972.

== Notable alumni ==
- Sir Derrick Capper, first Chief Constable of West Midlands Police
- Sir Ken Dodd, singer and comedian, attended the school during WWII while evacuated from Liverpool.
- Mark Evans (explorer)
- David Harley, IT researcher and musician
- Ian Hunter, singer/songwriter
- Geoffrey Othen, cricketer
- Tim Preece, actor.
- Guy Jocelyn Reid, sculptor
- Peter Reynolds, archaeologist
- Peter Roach (phonetician)
- Trevor Rowley, archaeologist
- Christopher Timothy, actor

== See also ==
- Listed buildings in Shrewsbury (northwest central area)
- Shrewsbury Sixth Form College
- Priory School, Shrewsbury
