= Guy Jocelyn Reid =

British sculptor

Guy Jocelyn Reid (born in 1963) is a British sculptor, best known for creating portraits carved from limewood. He currently lives and works in Benque d’Aurignac in South West France.

== Early life and education ==
Reid was born in Johannesburg, South Africa, in 1963. In 1967 he moved to London, attending Priory Comprehensive School Wimbledon and the Priory Grammar School for Boys, Shrewsbury. Reid has said that woodwork and metalwork lessons featured prominently in his school life. In 1984 Reid graduated from North London Polytechnic with a BA in Politics and History, before completing an MA in Systematic Theology at King's College London.

== Career ==
After graduating from King's College in 1995 Reid travelled to Berlin where he saw the works of late-Gothic German sculptors Tilman Riemenschneider and Gregor Erhart. Their work left a great impression on him and served to stimulate his burgeoning curiosity and interest in sculpting and carving with limewood. Reid's pursuit of this ambition led him to apprentice with North London-based antique restorer A. J. Brett, before moving on to the then-renowned Spink Restoration Workshop, now Arlington Conservation, where he worked for the next 10 years. Whilst at Spink he worked for a variety of established institutions such as the Metropolitan Museum New York, the Getty Museum California, Harewood House and the Sir John Soane Museum London. He has since said of this time that he arrived at his career in limewood sculpting through restoration.

With the acquisition of his own workshop, Reid began creating personal work in earnest in 1995. His first solo exhibition was in 1999, and he went on to exhibit extensively in the UK and internationally, predominantly in the US and in France.

== Notable work and commissions ==
In addition to his personal work, Reid has been commissioned for numerous public and private sculptures. From 1999 until 2001 he was artist in residence at St. Matthew's Westminster, during which time he created a statue of ‘Madonna and Child’, a piece that has attracted both acclaim and controversy due to his portrayal of a naked Mary.

In 2013 he was commissioned by the publisher David Fickling to create sculptures of four of their most prominent authors: Philip Pullman, Dame Jacqueline Wilson, Nick Sharratt, and Ian Beck. The sculptures, each measuring 2 feet high, were full figure portraits carved out of limewood and handpainted by Reid. The portrait of Dame Jacqueline Wilson won the Society of Portrait Sculptors annual prize for best portrait for 2015.

== Themes ==
Reid's work to date is almost exclusively concerned with the exploration of the human form through sculpture, and is typically realistic in its interpretation of his sitter. He works using both photographic references and studies from life, a method that can create a slightly distorted or exacerbated perspective. In this way he challenges the way we experience the portrait and its subject, an aspect of his work that he pushes even further in his relief sculptures, commenting of these that they are ‘both the photographic image but…also the distortion of the photographic image. The reliefs…make a whole different way of seeing’.

At King's College, Reid wrote his postgraduate thesis on the relationship between revelation and art, a philosophical consideration that continues to impact upon his work. Whilst he would consider himself to be agnostic, his curiosity and interest in theology and living a spiritual life is evident in his artistic work and practice, and he has created numerous sculptures that are concerned with religious figures or themes including a figure of Adam for Mirfield College, Yorkshire, a sculpture of St. Editha for Polesworth Abbey, and a nude crucifixion for Saint George's Church in Paris.
