= Duncan Perry =

English cricketer

Duncan Christopher Perry (born 9 September 1962) is a former English cricketer. He was a left-handed batsman and left-arm medium-fast bowler who played for Shropshire. He was born in Manchester and educated at the Wakeman Grammar School in Shrewsbury.

Perry, who represented Leicestershire Second XI between 1979 and 1981, played for Shropshire in the Minor Counties Championship in 1983 and 1987, while playing at club level for Shrewsbury. He made a single List A appearance for the team, in the 1983 NatWest Trophy competition, against Somerset. From the tailend, Perry scored 5 runs, and took bowling figures of 2-30.
