= John Davies (English cricketer) =

English cricketer (1932–2024)

Personal information
- Full name: John Trevor Davies
- Born: 26 December 1932; Shrewsbury, Shropshire, England
- Died: 11 April 2024 (aged 91)
- Batting: Right-handed

Domestic team information
- Years: Team
- 1959–1964: Dorset
- 1957–1958: Shropshire
- 1956–1958: Cambridge University

Career statistics
Competition	First-class
Matches	8
Runs scored	94
Batting average	6.26
100s/50s	–/–
Top score	29
Balls bowled	–
Wickets	–
Bowling average	–
5 wickets in innings	–
10 wickets in match	–
Best bowling	–
Catches/stumpings	4/–
- Source: Cricinfo, 30 May 2011

John Trevor Davies (26 December 1932 – 11 April 2024) was an English cricketer. He was a right-handed batsman.

== Biography ==
John Trevor Davies was born in Shrewsbury, Shropshire, on 26 December 1932. He was educated at the Priory Grammar School, Shrewsbury and Cambridge University.

Davies made his first-class debut for Cambridge University against Surrey in 1957. He made 7 further first-class appearances for the university, the last coming against Middlesex in 1958. In his 8 first-class matches, he took 94 runs at an average of 6.26, with a highest score of 29. His highest score came against Worcestershire in 1957. His score was 6 more than his next highest, 23 scored against the touring West Indians in 1957. As a fielder, Davies took 4 catches.

He also played Minor Counties Championship cricket for Shropshire from 1957 to 1958, and for Dorset from 1959 to 1964, making a combined total of 50 appearances in Minor counties cricket.

Davies died on 11 April 2024, aged 91.
