= Joe Hart =

English footballer (born 1987)

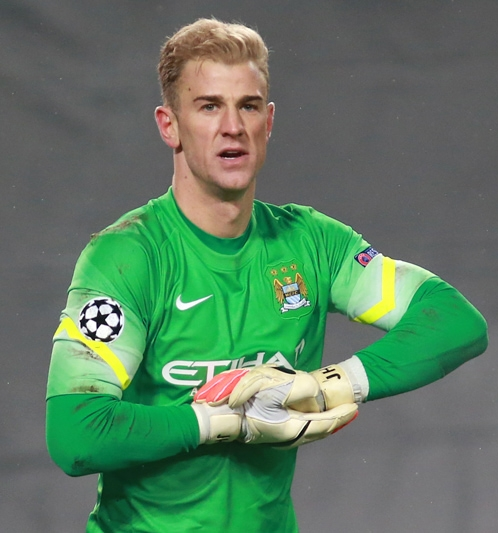
- Hart in 2014

Personal information
- Full name: Charles Joseph John Hart
- Date of birth: 19 April 1987 (age 39)
- Place of birth: Shrewsbury, England
- Height: 6 ft 5 in (1.96 m)
- Position: Goalkeeper

Youth career
- –2003: Shrewsbury Town

Senior career*
| Years | Team | Apps | (Gls) |
| 2003–2006 | Shrewsbury Town | 54 | (0) |
| 2006–2018 | Manchester City | 266 | (0) |
| 2007 | → Tranmere Rovers (loan) | 6 | (0) |
| 2007 | → Blackpool (loan) | 5 | (0) |
| 2009–2010 | → Birmingham City (loan) | 36 | (0) |
| 2016–2017 | → Torino (loan) | 36 | (0) |
| 2017–2018 | → West Ham United (loan) | 19 | (0) |
| 2018–2020 | Burnley | 19 | (0) |
| 2020–2021 | Tottenham Hotspur | 0 | (0) |
| 2021–2024 | Celtic | 109 | (0) |
| Total | | 550 | (0) |

International career
| 2005–2006 | England U19 | 6 | (0) |
| 2007–2009 | England U21 | 21 | (0) |
| 2008–2017 | England | 75 | (0) |
- * Club domestic league appearances and goals

Charles Joseph John Hart (born 19 April 1987) is an English football pundit, coach and former player who played as a goalkeeper. He was most recently the goalkeeper coach of EFL League Two club Shrewsbury Town.

He began his career at his hometown club Shrewsbury Town in the Football Conference and League Two. In 2006, he moved up to the Premier League with Manchester City, having attracted the attention of several other top-flight teams. In his first season, he spent time on loan at Tranmere Rovers and Blackpool. Hart had a loan spell with Birmingham City in the 2009–10 season, during which he was nominated for the PFA Young Player of the Year and was voted as the Premier League goalkeeper of the season in recognition of his performances. He returned to Manchester City for the 2010–11 season and won the Golden Glove for keeping the most clean sheets throughout the Premier League season. Hart replicated this feat in the 2011–12 season as Manchester City won the Premier League title. He won the Golden Glove for the third year in a row the following season, and won again in 2012–13 for his fourth in five years. In between, Hart won a second Premier League title with Manchester City in 2013–14. With over 100 Premier League clean sheets, Hart holds the joint record for the most Golden Glove awards (four).

With the arrival of new manager Pep Guardiola at Manchester City in 2016, Hart became the second-choice goalkeeper and made only one appearance in the UEFA Champions League before moving on loan to Torino and West Ham United in successive seasons. In August 2018, he moved to Burnley on a permanent transfer after injuries to the club's two regular goalkeepers. When they returned from injury, Hart again found himself in the role of backup and he left the club at the end of his contract in June 2020. In August 2020, Hart signed with Tottenham Hotspur on a two-year deal. A year later, he signed for Scottish Premiership side Celtic. At Celtic, Hart rejuvenated his career, winning seven honours in three seasons at Celtic Park, including three consecutive Scottish Premiership titles, two Scottish League Cups and two Scottish Cups. He retired at the end of the 2023–24 season.

A former regular for England at Under-21 level, Hart made his senior international debut in June 2008, and was recognised as England's first-choice goalkeeper from 2010 to 2017. He gained 75 caps, kept 43 clean sheets and was selected in England's squads for two FIFA World Cups and two UEFA European Championships.

== Early life ==
Hart was born in Shrewsbury, Shropshire, to Charles Hart, who sold gym equipment, and his wife Louise, a nursery school teacher. He attended Oxon Primary School, followed by Meole Brace School in Shrewsbury, where he was head boy in his final year. As a schoolboy, he was an equally competent cricketer and briefly played for Shrewsbury CC in the Birmingham and District Premier League and also spent two years in Worcestershire's youth squads, playing alongside England cricketer Steven Davies.

== Club career ==
=== Shrewsbury Town ===
While still a 15-year-old schoolboy, Hart travelled with the first-team squad of his hometown club, Shrewsbury Town, to Exeter City on 1 February 2003. He was a non-playing substitute on that occasion and fulfilled that role again versus Rochdale at Gay Meadow on 1 March 2003, still some six weeks short of his 16th birthday. This match yielded Shrewsbury's final victory in a season that culminated in relegation to the Football Conference. During the one season that Shrewsbury spent in the Conference, Hart made his senior debut on 20 April 2004, the day after his 17th birthday. He played the full 90 minutes in the match against Gravesend & Northfleet. Four days later, he conceded three at Morecambe.

Hart did not play again until April of the following year, as Scott Howie dominated goalkeeping duties. With Shrewsbury back in the Football League and struggling in the newly renamed League Two, Hart played six matches, conceding four goals.

From the start of the 2005–06 season, Hart made the step up into the first team, and became the club's first-choice goalkeeper. He played a full 46-match league season, conceding 55 goals. Despite conceding more than one goal per game, Hart won plaudits for his personal performances, winning his first England under-19 cap in October 2005, as a substitute against Poland.

Hart also found admirers in the Premier League, with several top-flight scouts attending matches. On 30 November 2005, the Shropshire Star newspaper reported that Everton goalkeeping coach Chris Woods had been present at Town's previous league match, a 4–3 loss at Rochdale. Manager Gary Peters said "Everton have been to watch him, but you could say the same about Arsenal, Chelsea and every other team in the Premiership." Speculation about his future continued for the duration of the season, and with the presence of their goalkeeping coach Tim Flowers at several matches, Manchester City became the most likely of his suitors.

Hart was announced as the top League Two player for January 2006 in the PFA Fans' Player of the Month Awards, voted for by fans via the Professional Footballers' Association website. At the PFA Awards ceremony on 23 March 2006, it was announced that Hart had been voted as League Two's best goalkeeper for 2005–06 by his fellow professionals, earning him a place in the League Two PFA Team of the Year.

=== Manchester City ===
==== 2006–07: Beginnings and early loan spells ====
Hart's move to Manchester City was completed as soon as Hart returned from England under-19 duty in Belgium, where a defeat to Serbia and Montenegro in the elite round meant England failed to qualify for the 2006 UEFA European Under-19 Championship. It was reported at the time that City were to pay an initial £600,000 fee for Hart, rising to £1.5 million if undisclosed clauses were achieved, but John Wardle, then City chairman, revealed in 2012 that the transfer fee was actually £100,000. Hart was recommended to the City hierarchy by the club's goalkeeping coach Tim Flowers who believed he had great potential. Hart made his debut for City on 14 October 2006 after injuries ruled out Andreas Isaksson and Nicky Weaver for the Premier League match against Sheffield United. He kept a clean sheet in the match, which finished goalless.

Hart spent January 2007 on loan to League One club Tranmere Rovers. He made six appearances and conceded eight goals. He was then named in his then club manager Stuart Pearce's first squad in his part-time role as England U21 coach, alongside another goalkeeper uncapped at U21 level, Ben Alnwick. He was not chosen to start the match on 6 February 2007 against Spain, but did come on as a substitute late in the match.

In April 2007, Hart joined Blackpool on loan as cover for the injured trio of Rhys Evans, Paul Rachubka and Lewis Edge. He kept a clean sheet in a 2–0 win for Blackpool away to Huddersfield Town on 9 April 2007, in his first appearance for the club. Blackpool won all five matches in which Hart appeared, including a 6–3 win away to Swansea City in his final appearance.

==== 2007–09: First-choice goalkeeper ====
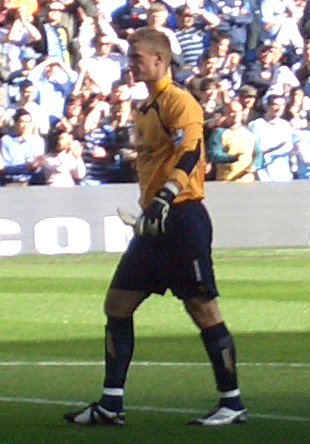
Hart playing for Manchester City in 2008

On his return from a successful loan spell at Blackpool, then Manchester City manager Sven-Göran Eriksson named Hart as Manchester City's number one ahead of Andreas Isaksson. After his performance against Newcastle United, Eriksson named him as "one of the biggest talents in this country as a goalkeeper", and that he had the potential to become an England international in the future. Only months later, he made his England debut against Trinidad and Tobago on 1 June 2008. In October, he was inducted to Shropshire Schools & Colleges Football Association's Hall of Fame along with former teammate David Edwards in recognition of their achievements. Later that month, he signed a new five-year contract.

After Isaksson's departure to PSV Eindhoven, Hart took the vacant number 1 jersey when the official squad numbers for the 2008–09 season were announced. However, his position as first-choice keeper was taken by Shay Given upon the Irishman's arrival at the club in January 2009.

==== 2009–10: Loan to Birmingham City ====
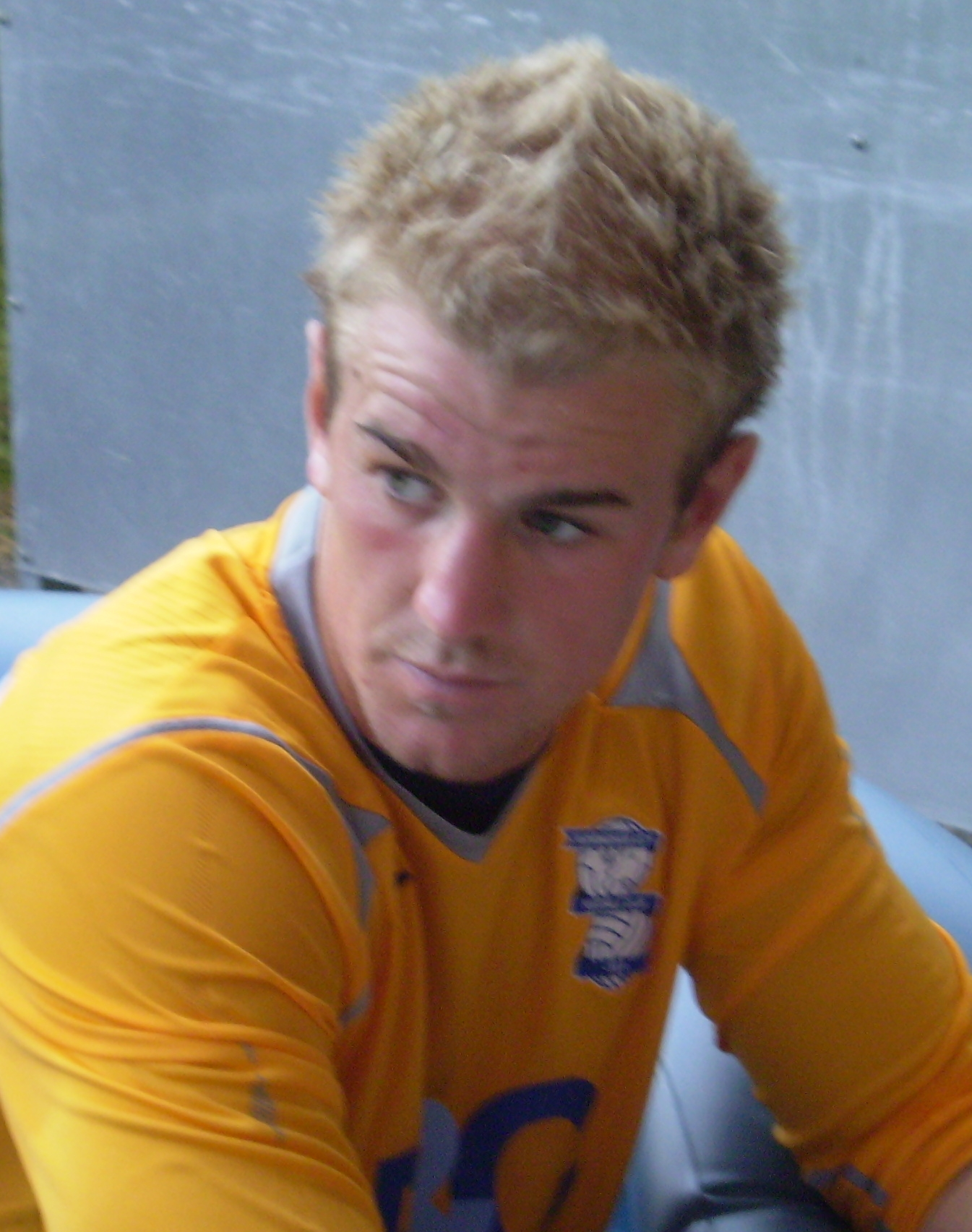
Hart with Birmingham City in 2009

Having made no appearances for City since Given's arrival, rumours began to emerge of a loan move away from Manchester. City secured the transfer of Stuart Taylor from Aston Villa on 23 June 2009, paving the way for Hart to leave. The following day it was announced that Hart would spend the 2009–10 Premier League season on loan to newly promoted Birmingham City. He made his debut in Birmingham's opening match of the season, a 1–0 defeat away to Manchester United.

In the early part of the season, Hart made some errors which cost Birmingham City goals, and Maik Taylor's clean sheet against Manchester City, a match for which Hart was ineligible, left manager Alex McLeish with a selection dilemma. McLeish chose Hart, who kept his place in the starting 11 as Birmingham went on a club-record 12-match unbeaten run in the top division and set a Premier League record by fielding the same starting 11 for nine consecutive matches. His performances improved: against Chelsea in December, he "showed not only sharp judgment and reflexes, making three outstanding saves ... but a lack of fear also", despite needing staples in a gashed head sustained when diving at the feet of Salomon Kalou. Hart was voted Birmingham City's Player of the Year for 2009–10, and nominated for the 2010 PFA Young Player of the Year award alongside Wayne Rooney, Cesc Fàbregas and James Milner. Though Milner won that award, Hart earned a place in the PFA Team of the Year.

==== 2010–16: League and cup honours ====
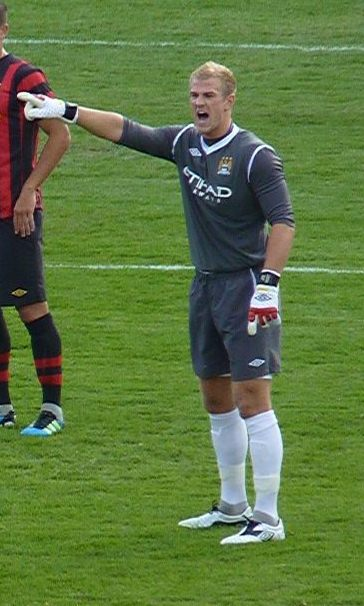
Hart playing for Manchester City in 2011

After a successful spell at Birmingham, Hart earned a place in the England squad for the 2010 FIFA World Cup in South Africa. Manchester City manager Roberto Mancini was unsure over the future of Hart and sent his goalkeeping coach, Massimo Battara to watch over him during his loan spell at Birmingham City. Battara reported that Hart was a "very good goalkeeper, with very high physical and technical abilities" and advised that he kept Hart in his plans for the years ahead. One of the major pre-season debates was whether Hart would start ahead of the experienced Shay Given after his return to City following an impressive loan spell with Birmingham City.

Hart was chosen ahead of Shay Given to start the opening match of the 2010–11 season against Tottenham Hotspur. He produced a man of the match performance, saving numerous challenging shots including a deflected effort from Benoît Assou-Ekotto, which helped City to draw the match 0–0. Hart also kept a clean sheet in Manchester City's 3–0 victory over Liverpool, where he was still first-choice goalkeeper and made even more good saves, enhancing his reputation even further. Hart conceded his first goal of the season from a late penalty by Darren Bent in a 1–0 defeat at Sunderland, and made an error that led to Blackburn Rovers' opening goal in a 1–1 draw two weeks later.

Hart helped his team overcome Manchester United in the FA Cup semi-final by producing an excellent early save to deny Dimitar Berbatov the opening goal; the match ended 1–0 to City, thanks to a goal scored by Yaya Touré. He kept another clean sheet against Tottenham Hotspur to earn his team a place in the Champions League for the first time, and another in the 2011 FA Cup Final in which Manchester City beat Stoke City 1–0 with another goal from Touré.

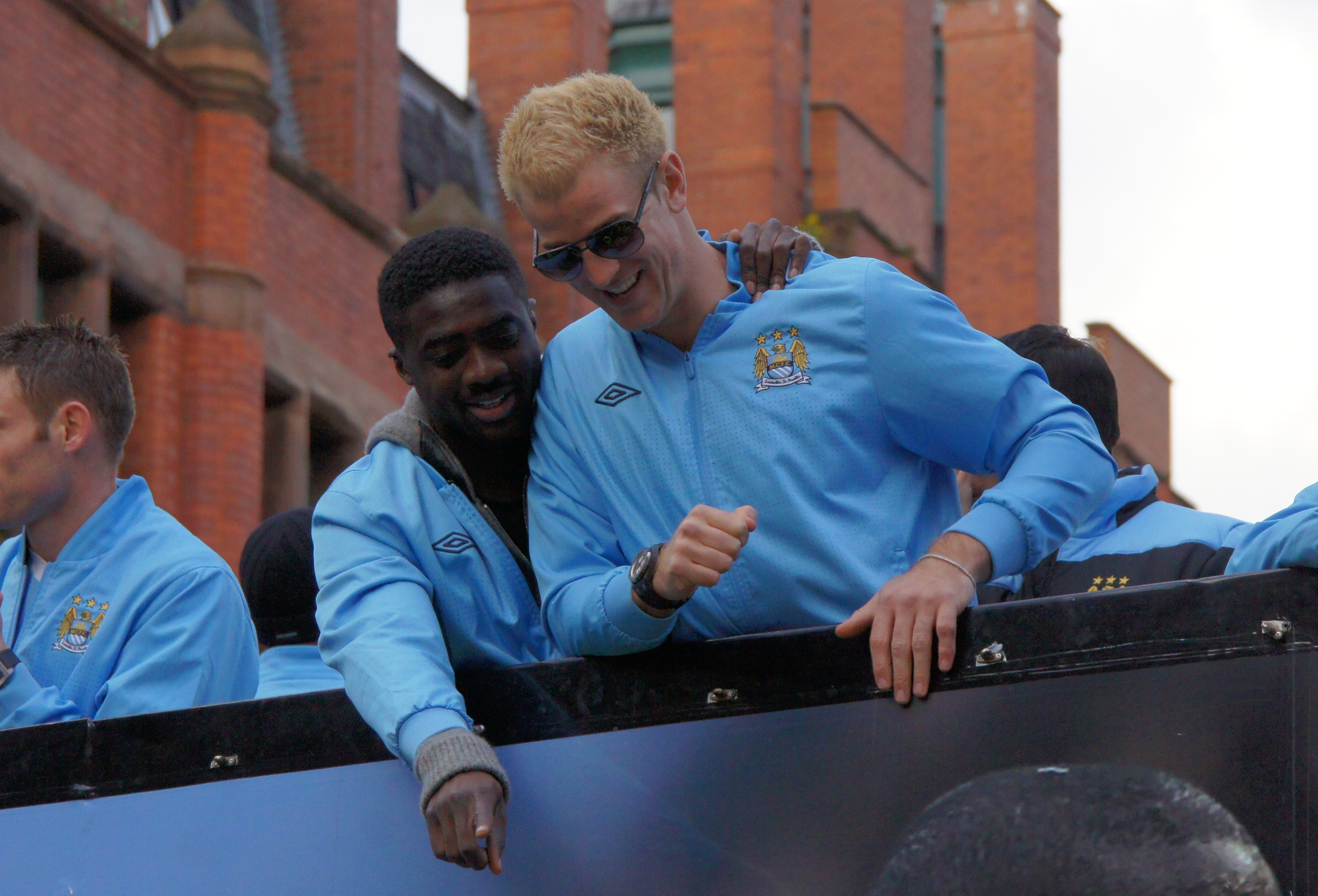
Hart and Kolo Touré celebrating winning the Premier League with Manchester City in 2012

Hart's 18 clean sheets in the 2010–11 Premier League season earned him the Premier League Golden Glove award. He also set a new club record for the most clean sheets during a season, with 29; the previous mark was set by Nicky Weaver with 26 when the team were playing two divisions lower. He also received City's Performance of the Season award for the match against Tottenham Hotspur in August 2010.

Hart's position as City's "number one" was cemented when Given departed City for Aston Villa in July 2011. On 8 August 2011, he signed a new contract until 2016. Hart won the Golden Glove award for the second year running in 2011–12, and helped City to win their first Premier League title, and first top-flight title for 44 years, which they clinched on the final day of the season by beating Queens Park Rangers 3–2. His performances also earned him a place in the PFA Team of the Year for 2011–12.

Hart's form dipped slightly in the 2012–13 Premier League season, although he still won the Golden Glove award for keeping the most clean sheets despite rivals Manchester United regaining the Premier League title. Hart made notable errors in matches against Southampton when he spilled a Rickie Lambert effort which led to a goal and for a late consolation goal in a win against West Ham United. Hart started in goal for Manchester City in the 2013 FA Cup Final against Wigan Athletic, however, Wigan won 1–0. Manager Roberto Mancini made negative comments about Hart's performances during the season.

His form continued to dip in the 2013–14 Premier League season. On 25 August 2013, Hart made a mistake from a corner that led to a 3–2 win for Cardiff City. After a communication mix-up with defender Matija Nastasić led to a decisive 90th-minute goal by Fernando Torres in a 2–1 loss to Chelsea at Stamford Bridge on 27 October, he was replaced by Costel Pantilimon for a home match against Norwich City which City won 7–0. A month later, Hart returned to the Manchester City team for a Champions League group match against Viktoria Plzeň. Hart regained his place as City's starting goalkeeper in the Premier League in a 4–2 win over Fulham on 21 December 2013, and remained first choice as the team went on to win the league for the second time in three seasons.

On 24 February 2015, Hart saved a penalty kick from six-time FIFA Ballon d'Or winner Lionel Messi in a Champions League round of 16 fixture against FC Barcelona. After the return leg of the same tie Messi described Hart as a "phenomenon" after a performance where he made 10 saves during the match, a record for an English goalkeeper in the Champions League. In the next match, a 3–0 win against West Bromwich Albion, he reached 100 Premier League clean sheets. Hart ended the 2014–15 season by keeping a clean sheet against Southampton in his 300th appearance for Manchester City to win the Premier League Golden Glove award for the fourth time. Hart's performances during 2015 earned him a nomination for the UEFA Team of the Year awards; however, the award was won by Manuel Neuer.

On 6 April 2016, Hart saved a penalty kick from Zlatan Ibrahimović in Manchester City's Champions League quarter-final first leg against Paris Saint-Germain at the Parc des Princes. It was his second penalty save of the season's competition, after previously keeping out Raffael's kick in a 2–1 group stage win at Borussia Mönchengladbach on 30 September 2015.

==== 2016–18: Loans to Torino and West Ham United ====
On 13 August 2016, Hart was dropped by new manager Pep Guardiola for the first match of the 2016–17 Premier League season. The absence followed his poor performances at UEFA Euro 2016, and Guardiola's desire for a player with better footwork who could fill a sweeper-keeper role. Hart made his first start of the 2016–17 season in a Champions League qualifying match against Steaua Bucharest, as captain of the City side that won 1–0 on the night, 6–0 on aggregate. Following the match, Hart was applauded by the crowd, in an atmosphere which was described as resembling a pre-departure testimonial. Following speculation linking Hart with various top European clubs, including Arsenal, Borussia Dortmund, Everton, Liverpool, Milan and Sevilla, Hart surprisingly decided to pursue a season-long loan in Serie A with Torino. In doing so, he became the first English goalkeeper to sign for a Serie A club since the league's inception in 1929. In 2018 Guardiola described his decision to let Hart leave on-loan as being one of the hardest he had ever had to make as a manager and in 2026, said not giving him a chance was the biggest regret of his Man City career.

On 11 September 2016, Hart suffered a tough start in his debut for Torino, being partly at fault for the equaliser in a 2–1 away defeat to Atalanta when his punch from a corner fell at the feet of an opposing attacker who scored. However, he then kept consecutive clean sheets in his next two appearances against Empoli and Pescara, both of which ended 0–0. Over the course of the season, Hart made a number of high-profile mistakes which led to goals being conceded. Hart played in all 36 of Torino's remaining league matches in the 2016–17 season, but in April the club's president Urbano Cairo suggested his level of performance had dropped amid transfer speculation. Cairo also publicly stated that "we didn't expect so many mistakes from an England international". The club finished in ninth position (of 20) in Serie A. Hart managed five clean sheets in 36 games. Torino did not sign Hart permanently after his loan spell ended.

On 18 July 2017, Hart signed for Premier League club West Ham United on a season-long loan, having been permitted to find another club by City. He made his debut for West Ham on 13 August 2017, in a 4–0 defeat away to Manchester United and conceded 10 goals in his first three appearances, although West Ham captain Mark Noble defended his goalkeeper's performances. In a Daily Telegraph article, it was claimed that opposing forwards were able to exploit a "weakness" against "low shots to his left". Hart was eventually dropped from the starting line-up and replaced by Adrián for the December game against Chelsea. Hart played his last game for West Ham on 22 April 2018 as they were beaten 4–1 by Arsenal. Playing for his place in the England team in the upcoming World Cup, Hart played well in the game making some crucial stops; however, he was dropped again for the last few games of the season, and ultimately did not make the World Cup squad.

=== Burnley ===
In August 2018, Burnley announced the signing of Hart on an initial two-year contract for an undisclosed fee, believed to be in the region of £3.5m. Hart was signed due to injuries to regular keepers Tom Heaton and Nick Pope. This ended his 12-year association with Manchester City and his former chairman, Khaldoon Al Mubarak said, "Joe Hart's contribution to Manchester City cannot be overstated. He will rightly be regarded as a City legend in perpetuity."

He made his Burnley debut on 9 August in the first leg of the third qualifying round of the Europa League against İstanbul Başakşehir, keeping a clean sheet in a 0–0 draw. After playing in Burnley's first 19 league games of the season, he was dropped for a recovered Tom Heaton after a 5–1 defeat to Everton on Boxing Day.

After making only three appearances during the 2019–20 season, all of which came in cup competitions, Burnley opted not to extend Hart's contract beyond the end of June 2020 and he left the club.

=== Tottenham Hotspur ===
After leaving Burnley, Hart joined Tottenham Hotspur on a free transfer. He signed a two-year deal with the club. Hart made his debut for Tottenham in the Europa League away tie against Shkëndija on 24 September 2020 which Spurs won 3–1. He was at fault for two of the goals in a 3–3 draw against LASK on 3 December.

=== Celtic ===
On 3 August 2021, after being told he was not part of new Spurs manager Nuno Espírito Santo's plans, Hart signed for Scottish club Celtic on a three-year contract. Hart made his debut two days after signing in a 4–2 away win against Czech side FK Jablonec in the Europa League, but appeared uncomfortable during the match, particularly during Celtic's concession of a second goal. However, manager Ange Postecoglou said that Hart's debut was "okay" and insisted that "Joe will improve". He made his Scottish Premiership debut on 8 August, keeping a clean sheet in the 6–0 thrashing of Dundee at Celtic Park.

Hart made an error in the Europa League qualifying play-off match against AZ Alkmaar on 26 August 2021, failing to clear his lines and conceding as a result. He did go some way to redeeming himself later in the same game, with two impressive saves to deny Zakaria Aboukhlal from scoring either side of half-time. And although Celtic lost 2–1 on the night, they narrowly managed to win the tie on aggregate.

On 19 September, Hart was named stand-in captain for a league game against Livingston. Hart received praise for his performance despite Celtic losing 1–0, making saves to deny Jack Fitzwater and Alan Forrest. Hart received plaudits for his performance against Hibernian on 27 October, denying a close-range Joe Newell effort and smothering a Jamie Murphy strike, helping Celtic to a 3–1 win. Two matches later, however, Hart was at fault again for a goal in a 4–2 win at Dundee.

On 19 December 2021, Hart played the full 90 minutes as Celtic won the 2021–22 Scottish League Cup after defeating Hibernian 2–1 via a brace from Kyogo Furuhashi in the final. In May 2022, Hart won the 2021–22 Scottish Premiership with Celtic.

In October 2022, Hart made an error against RB Leipzig in an away Champions League group stage fixture. The error led to Leipzig's third goal in a 3–1 defeat.

During Celtic's 2022–23 season, Hart was the first-choice keeper as the club secured a domestic treble. He played the full 90 minutes in both the Scottish League Cup and Scottish Cup finals, as the club also secured the domestic title.

On 22 February 2024, Hart announced that he would retire at the end of the season. On 25 May 2024, at the 2023–24 Scottish Cup final match against rivals Rangers, Hart played the last game of his professional career and won the Scottish Cup.

== International career ==
=== Youth levels ===
Hart made his first international appearance in September 2005 in an England under-19 friendly match against Belgium at Darlington; replacing starting goalkeeper Ben Alnwick at half-time, he was unable to save the penalty that made the score 3–2, but with three minutes left made a "terrific one on one save" from an unmarked attacker. He played in five more matches for the under-19s, his last a 1–0 defeat away to Serbia and Montenegro on 22 May 2006.

After making his under-21 debut as a substitute for Scott Carson in a 2–2 draw with Spain, Hart was selected by Stuart Pearce in the 30-man preliminary squad for the 2007 UEFA European Under-21 Championship, and made the final 23. In the team's final friendly before the finals, Hart was selected for his first under-21 start, and played the full 90 minutes in a 5–0 win over Slovakia at Carrow Road. However, Hart took no part in the finals, with Carson playing in all four of England's fixtures.

Hart played in all the qualifying matches for the 2009 European Championships, In the finals, he started the first two group-stage matches and was rested for the last match as England had already sealed their passage to the knock-out stage. In the semi-final against Sweden, he conceded three goals in the second half as the match ended 3–3 after extra time, but made up for it by saving a penalty and scoring another as England won 5–4 in the shoot-out. However, he was yellow-carded for leaving his line to talk to Mikael Lustig as he prepared to take his penalty. England's appeal was rejected, so Hart was suspended for the final; Scott Loach kept goal as England lost 4–0 to Germany.

=== Senior team ===
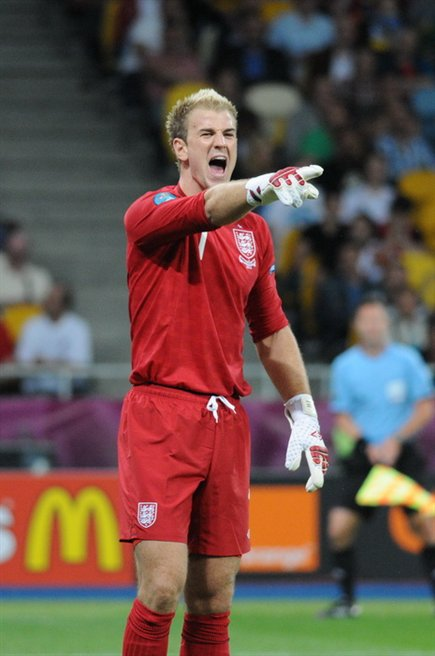
Hart playing for England at UEFA Euro 2012

Having been a regular in the England under-21 squad, Hart was called up by Fabio Capello to the senior England team for the friendly matches against the United States and Trinidad and Tobago. An unused substitute against the United States, he made his debut against Trinidad and Tobago on 1 June 2008 at the Hasely Crawford Stadium, Port of Spain. He came on at half time for David James with England 2–0 up, eventually running out 3–0 winners. However, Hart's senior England debut did not earn Shrewsbury Town the expected bonus of £500,000 from Manchester City, as negotiated as part of his transfer in 2006, because it was not a competitive match.

Hart kept his place in the squad for a friendly against the Czech Republic in August, but remained unused. After Blackburn Rovers goalkeeper Paul Robinson withdrew from the squad for World Cup qualifiers against Ukraine and Belarus in October 2009, Hart took his place, and in November, he was called up for a friendly against Brazil, but he did not appear in either match.

Capello named Hart in his provisional 30-man squad for the 2010 FIFA World Cup. Hart played the second half of both of England's warm-up matches, replacing Robert Green against Mexico and James against Japan, and kept a clean sheet in each case. All three goalkeepers, Hart, Green and James, were included in the final 23-man selection.

Hart did not feature in the World Cup but started England's next match, a friendly against Hungary, to earn his fourth cap. He conceded his first England goal in dubious circumstances when the ball appeared not to have crossed the line from a deflection from Phil Jagielka, and made a vital late save from Zoltán Gera as England won 2–1. Hart was given his first competitive cap in a UEFA Euro 2012 qualifier, a 4–0 win against Bulgaria at Wembley Stadium; he made three crucial saves, one of which he palmed away to begin the counterattack that led to an England goal. However, he had a poor game in another Euro 2012 qualifier against Switzerland on 4 June 2011, inexplicably letting in two Tranquillo Barnetta free-kicks. For the second Switzerland goal Hart was caught out by a relatively straightforward shot which unexpectedly beat him at his near-post from a tight angle. Hart won another two caps November 2011 in friendlies against world champions Spain and Sweden, in each case keeping a clean sheet in a 1–0 England victory.

In February 2012, after the position was stripped from John Terry, some players and pundits backed Hart for England captaincy citing his strong performances and positive image.

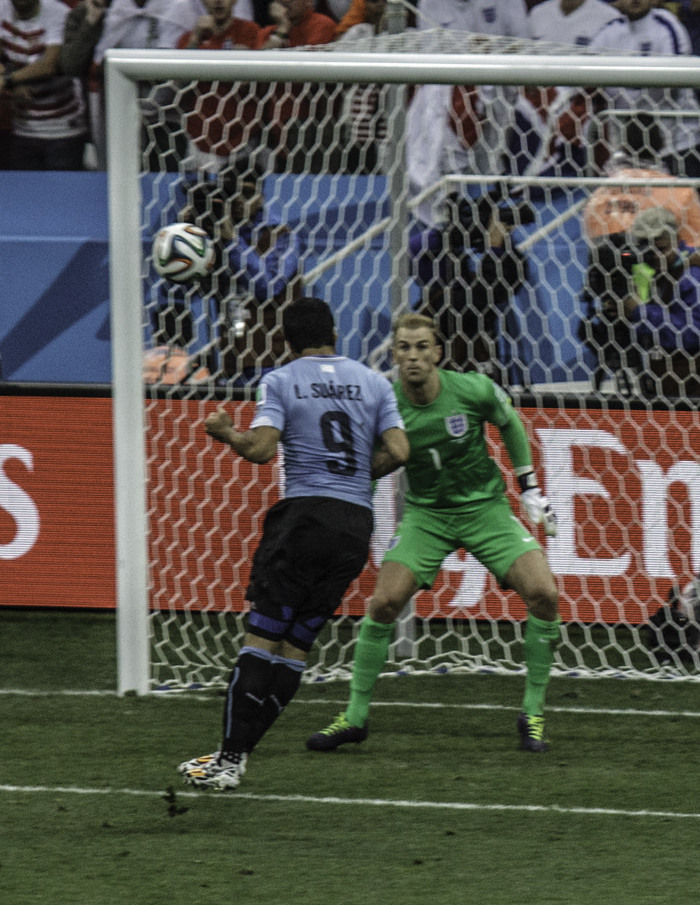
Hart (right) playing for England against Uruguay's Luis Suárez at the 2014 FIFA World Cup.

On 16 May 2012, new England manager Roy Hodgson named Hart in his UEFA Euro 2012 squad. He played in England's second warm-up friendly, against Belgium at Wembley Stadium, keeping a clean sheet as England won 1–0. Hart made a mistake in England's first game, conceding a goal from a near-post Samir Nasri shot, which Nasri later stated he 'teased' his Manchester City teammate about in the aftermath. The mistake cost England victory and the match ended 1–1. In the tournament Hart made the most saves of any goalkeeper in the group phase with 14. However, he was beaten by Andrea Pirlo's "Panenka" shot in England's penalty shoot-out defeat to Italy in the quarter-finals. Pirlo had stated that Hart's antics led to him thinking that "he had to get off his high horse".

Hart made another mistake in a 2014 World Cup qualifying game against Poland on 17 October 2012, failing to punch clear a corner which led to a crucial equaliser that deprived England of a win. The mistake followed pundit Roy Keane's claim Hart was "cocky" and that he needed sterner competition. In England's next match against Sweden, Hart put on an uncertain performance, letting in a saveable long-range free kick and then a 30-yard bicycle kick from Zlatan Ibrahimović following a poor headed clearance. Earlier in the match a communication breakdown between Hart and defender Gary Cahill had presented Sweden with a clear opportunity to make it 2–0, and manager Hodgson said that it was "not one of Joe's best nights".

On 6 February 2013, Hart saved a penalty kick and the subsequent follow-up shot from Ronaldinho in a friendly match against Brazil at Wembley Stadium. This double save proved to be crucial in helping England win the match 2–1, and thereby securing their first win over Brazil for 23 years. However, he made another error in a friendly match against arch-rivals Scotland on 14 August, allowing a long-range James Morrison shot to slip through his hands into the net. After the mistake Hodgson considered replacing Hart as first-choice keeper.

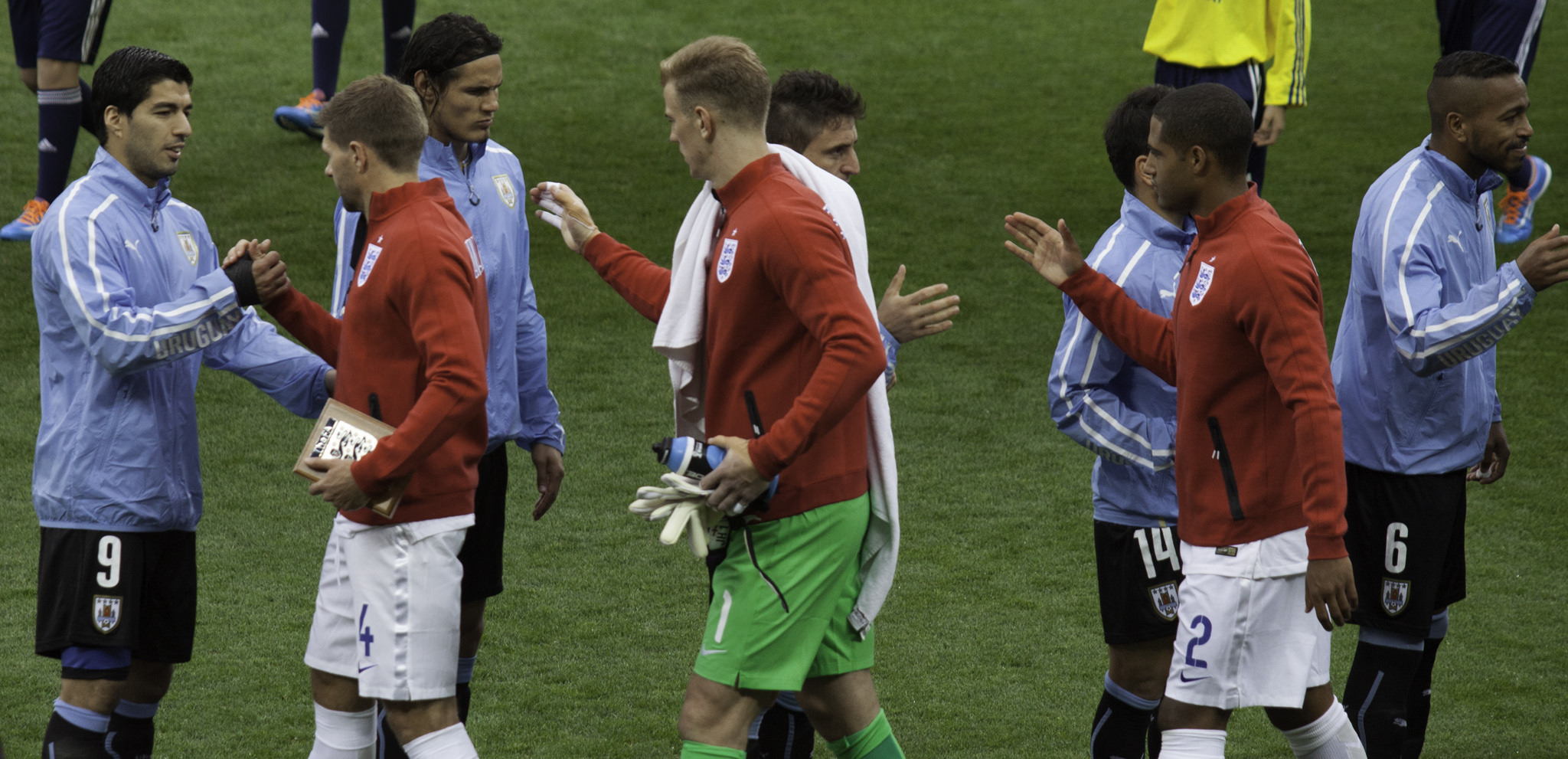
Hart, behind England captain Steven Gerrard, shaking hands with Uruguay's Edinson Cavani at the 2014 FIFA World Cup, 19 June 2014

Hart was selected for his second FIFA World Cup in 2014. He made his tournament debut in England's first group match, a 2–1 defeat to Italy in Manaus, and also played in the next match, a loss by the same scoreline to Uruguay where Luis Suárez scored both goals. With England not likely to advance, Hodgson made changes for their last match, against Costa Rica, with Ben Foster playing in goal instead. In what turned out to be Hart's only World Cup tournament as first-choice keeper, England went out in the group stages.

In October 2014, England fans voted Hart man of the match against San Marino – in which he made only one save and rarely touched the ball – and repeated the exercise a few days later against Estonia; Jack Wilshere was the official best player in each fixture. Hart became the sixth English goalkeeper to earn his 50th cap, in a 1–1 friendly draw with Italy at Juventus Stadium on 31 March 2015. On 13 November that year, with Rooney rested, he captained England for the first time in a 2–0 friendly defeat to Spain in Alicante. A poor kicked clearance from Hart late in the match led to Spain's second goal from Santi Cazorla.

In a warm-up match for UEFA Euro 2016 against Turkey, Hart made an error in needlessly rushing out of goal during a Turkish attack, allowing Hakan Calhanoglu a simple finish into an open goal. However, Hart was included in England's 23-man squad for the final Euro 2016 tournament. In the second match, against Wales in Lens, he made an error to allow Gareth Bale to score from a long-range free kick, although England came back to win 2–1. Hart made another mistake to let in a winning goal from Kolbeinn Sigþórsson in the defeat to Iceland in the last 16, after which he admitted that criticism of the team would be justifiable.

In October 2016, Hart put up one of the best performances of his career, producing a "stunning saves-show" in their 2018 FIFA World Cup qualifier against Slovenia to secure a 0–0 draw. However, in a match during a World Cup qualifier against arch-rivals Scotland on 10 June 2017, Hart conceded two goals directly from free kicks for the second time in his England career. Hart was criticised as the free-kicks, both from Leigh Griffiths, were considered saveable. By this point, Hart was being described as "increasingly uncertain and exposed", and there were growing calls for him to be replaced as England's starting goalkeeper. These calls increased after Hart put in a further unconvincing performance against Slovakia on 4 September 2017, in which he made an error in allowing an early Stanislav Lobotka goal and an important second-half save from Adam Nemec.

Despite being England's goalkeeper at their three most recent major tournaments, on 16 May 2018, he was left out of Gareth Southgate's 23-man England national team squad for the 2018 FIFA World Cup. Hart did not play for England since. In 75 appearances for the national team, Hart kept 43 clean sheets, the second highest tally in England's history. However, he also conceded 48 goals, the 4th-highest in England's history and the most since Peter Shilton, and is also the only England goalkeeper to have played more than once at a World Cup but to have never kept a clean sheet at one.

== Style of play ==
Considered to be one of England's and the Premier League's best goalkeepers in his prime, Hart was known in particular for his exceptional speed and shot-stopping ability, as well as his ability to rush off his line quickly and utilise his large frame to stop opponents' shots in one on one situations. In 2015, Italian goalkeeper Gianluigi Buffon labelled Hart as one of the best goalkeepers in the world.

However, Hart also came under criticism from pundits and managers throughout his career for his perceived poor distribution, positioning, and ability to defend crosses, as well as for his inconsistency and tendency to commit technical errors, in particular following some high–profile mistakes on long range shots at Euro 2016, after which he suffered a noticeable decline in the level of his performances.

== Personal life ==
Hart married Kimberly Crew in Florence, Italy, in 2015. As of August 2016, they had one son.

In 2017, Hart was targeted in his car at a petrol station in Romford by thieves who stole his watch, wallet and mobile phone.

On 7 July 2018, Hart turned out for Shrewsbury Cricket Club during a Birmingham and District Premier League match against Knowle and Dorridge. He batted at number 9 – scoring 6 runs – and took a catch as the match ended in a draw.

== Media career ==
Hart worked as a pundit for the BBC during their coverage of Euro 2024. In August 2024, he was announced as a pundit on the BBC's Match of the Day programme from the beginning of the 2024–25 season.

== Career statistics ==
=== Club ===
Appearances and goals by club, season and competition
| Club | Season | League | | | National cup (Note: Includes FA Cup, Coppa Italia, Scottish Cup) | | League cup (Note: Includes Football League/EFL Cup, Scottish League Cup) | | Europe | | Other | | Total | |
| Club | Season | Division | Apps | Goals | Apps | Goals | Apps | Goals | Apps | Goals | Apps | Goals | Apps | Goals |
|---|---|---|---|---|---|---|---|---|---|---|---|---|---|---|
| Shrewsbury Town | 2002–03 | Third Division | 0 | 0 | 0 | 0 | 0 | 0 | — | | 0 | 0 | 0 | 0 |
| Shrewsbury Town | 2003–04 | Football Conference | 2 | 0 | 0 | 0 | — | | — | | 0 | 0 | 2 | 0 |
| Shrewsbury Town | 2004–05 | League Two | 6 | 0 | 0 | 0 | 0 | 0 | — | | 0 | 0 | 6 | 0 |
| Shrewsbury Town | 2005–06 | League Two | 46 | 0 | 2 | 0 | 2 | 0 | — | | 0 | 0 | 50 | 0 |
| Shrewsbury Town | Total | | 54 | 0 | 2 | 0 | 2 | 0 | — | | 0 | 0 | 58 | 0 |
| Manchester City | 2006–07 | Premier League | 1 | 0 | 0 | 0 | 0 | 0 | — | | — | | 1 | 0 |
| Manchester City | 2007–08 | Premier League | 26 | 0 | 3 | 0 | 3 | 0 | — | | — | | 32 | 0 |
| Manchester City | 2008–09 | Premier League | 23 | 0 | 1 | 0 | 0 | 0 | 9 (Note: Appearances in UEFA Cup) | 0 | — | | 33 | 0 |
| Manchester City | 2010–11 | Premier League | 38 | 0 | 8 | 0 | 0 | 0 | 9 (Note: Appearances in UEFA Europa League) | 0 | — | | 55 | 0 |
| Manchester City | 2011–12 | Premier League | 38 | 0 | 0 | 0 | 2 | 0 | 10 (Note: Six appearances in UEFA Champions League, four appearances in UEFA Europa League) | 0 | 1 (Note: Appearance in FA Community Shield) | 0 | 51 | 0 |
| Manchester City | 2012–13 | Premier League | 38 | 0 | 1 | 0 | 0 | 0 | 6 (Note: Appearance(s) in UEFA Champions League) | 0 | 0 | 0 | 45 | 0 |
| Manchester City | 2013–14 | Premier League | 31 | 0 | 0 | 0 | 1 | 0 | 7 | 0 | — | | 39 | 0 |
| Manchester City | 2014–15 | Premier League | 36 | 0 | 0 | 0 | 0 | 0 | 8 | 0 | 0 | 0 | 44 | 0 |
| Manchester City | 2015–16 | Premier League | 35 | 0 | 0 | 0 | 0 | 0 | 12 | 0 | — | | 47 | 0 |
| Manchester City | 2016–17 | Premier League | 0 | 0 | — | | — | | 1 | 0 | — | | 1 | 0 |
| Manchester City | Total | | 266 | 0 | 13 | 0 | 6 | 0 | 62 | 0 | 1 | 0 | 348 | 0 |
| Tranmere Rovers (loan) | 2006–07 | League One | 6 | 0 | — | | — | | — | | — | | 6 | 0 |
| Blackpool (loan) | 2006–07 | League One | 5 | 0 | — | | — | | — | | — | | 5 | 0 |
| Birmingham City (loan) | 2009–10 | Premier League | 36 | 0 | 5 | 0 | 0 | 0 | — | | — | | 41 | 0 |
| Torino (loan) | 2016–17 | Serie A | 36 | 0 | 1 | 0 | — | | — | | — | | 37 | 0 |
| West Ham United (loan) | 2017–18 | Premier League | 19 | 0 | 3 | 0 | 1 | 0 | — | | — | | 23 | 0 |
| Burnley | 2018–19 | Premier League | 19 | 0 | 0 | 0 | 0 | 0 | 2 | 0 | — | | 21 | 0 |
| Burnley | 2019–20 | Premier League | 0 | 0 | 2 | 0 | 1 | 0 | — | | — | | 3 | 0 |
| Burnley | Total | | 19 | 0 | 2 | 0 | 1 | 0 | 2 | 0 | — | | 24 | 0 |
| Tottenham Hotspur | 2020–21 | Premier League | 0 | 0 | 2 | 0 | 0 | 0 | 8 | 0 | — | | 10 | 0 |
| Celtic | 2021–22 | Scottish Premiership | 35 | 0 | 4 | 0 | 4 | 0 | 11 (Note: Nine appearances in UEFA Europa League, two appearances in UEFA Europa Conference League) | 0 | — | | 54 | 0 |
| Celtic | 2022–23 | Scottish Premiership | 37 | 0 | 5 | 0 | 2 | 0 | 6 | 0 | — | | 50 | 0 |
| Celtic | 2023–24 | Scottish Premiership | 37 | 0 | 5 | 0 | 1 | 0 | 6 | 0 | — | | 49 | 0 |
| Celtic | Total | | 109 | 0 | 14 | 0 | 7 | 0 | 23 | 0 | — | | 153 | 0 |
| Career total | | | 550 | 0 | 42 | 0 | 17 | 0 | 95 | 0 | 1 | 0 | 705 | 0 |

=== International ===
Appearances and goals by national team and year
| National team | Year | Apps | Goals |
|---|---|---|---|
| England | 2008 | 1 | 0 |
| England | 2009 | 0 | 0 |
| England | 2010 | 6 | 0 |
| England | 2011 | 9 | 0 |
| England | 2012 | 11 | 0 |
| England | 2013 | 11 | 0 |
| England | 2014 | 10 | 0 |
| England | 2015 | 9 | 0 |
| England | 2016 | 11 | 0 |
| England | 2017 | 7 | 0 |
| Total | | 75 | 0 |

== Honours ==
Shrewsbury Town

- Football Conference play-offs: 2004

Manchester City

- Premier League: 2011–12, 2013–14
- FA Cup: 2010–11; runner-up: 2012–13
- Football League Cup: 2013–14, 2015–16

Tottenham Hotspur

- EFL Cup runner-up: 2020–21

Celtic

- Scottish Premiership: 2021–22, 2022–23, 2023–24
- Scottish Cup: 2022–23, 2023–24
- Scottish League Cup: 2021–22, 2022–23

England U21

- UEFA European Under-21 Championship runner-up: 2009

Individual

- PFA Team of the Year: 2005–06 League Two, 2009–10 Premier League, 2011–12 Premier League
- Birmingham City Player of the Year: 2009–10
- Manchester City Performance of the Season: 2010–11
- Premier League Golden Glove: 2010–11, 2011–12, 2012–13, 2014–15
- PFA Scotland Team of the Year: 2022–23 Premiership
