= Radbrook Green =

Suburb of Shrewsbury, England

Coordinates: 52.696907°N 2.7750242°W

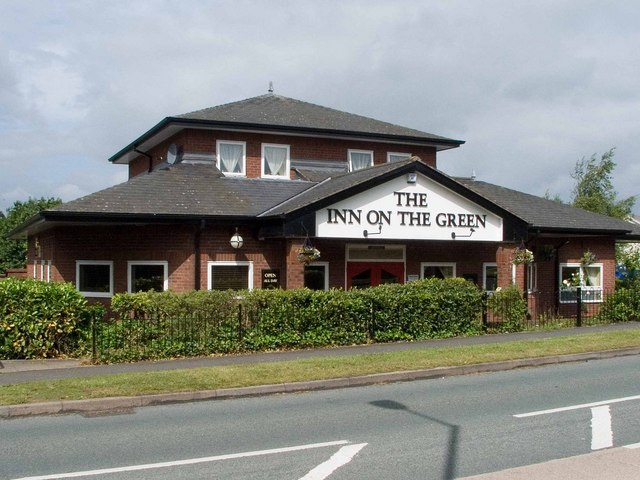
- The Inn On The Green public house, Bank Farm Road

- Location within Shropshire
- Population: 3,979 (2011 ward)
- OS grid reference: SJ477113
- Unitary authority: Shropshire
- Ceremonial county: Shropshire
- Region: West Midlands
- Country: England
- Sovereign state: United Kingdom
- Post town: Shrewsbury
- Postcode district: SY3
- Dialling code: 01743
- Police: West Mercia
- Fire: Shropshire
- Ambulance: West Midlands
- UK Parliament: Shrewsbury

Radbrook Green, usually known locally as simply Radbrook, is the name of a small suburb of Shrewsbury, situated to the south-west of the town, approximately 1.5 miles from the town centre. Construction of the estate started in the late 1970s, with most of the estate completed by the early 1990s. The population of the Shrewsbury Ward at the 2011 census was 3,979. It is a private housing estate, predominantly seen as a middle class area of the town.

The northern part of the estate is often referred to as 'Collegefields' (as houses in this area were built on fields of the nearby Shrewsbury College)

== Amenities ==
There is a post office, and other amenities such as a pub (Inn on the Green), and the Radbrook Community Centre which is home to the local Anglican church (Christ The King, Radbrook). The community centre was opened in 2005 after over 10 years of fundraising and campaigning for its construction. The local hotel, the Radbrook Hall Hotel, closed down in 2006 to be developed for housing and has since been demolished as a part of this programme of development.

== Education ==
Primary education in the suburb is largely handled by Radbrook Primary School, which opened in 1989. The Priory secondary school opened in 1939 and is situated on the edge of the suburb. The Meole Brace secondary school and academy is nearby situated on the edge of the suburb/neighbourhood Meole Brace which is a neighbouring suburb to Radbrook Green as is Copthorne, Kingsland and Belle Vue.

Radbrook Technical College was also in Radbrook, on Radbrook Road. It was built in 1898, as Shropshire Technical School for Girls, a domestic science college, and was latterly a campus of Shrewsbury College until this was closed in 2014. Planning permission was being sought in 2015 by site owners Shropshire Council and the Radbrook Foundation to develop the site for homes and plans were finally approved in 2017.

The new estate is called College Gardens, with Lady Garden Herbert Way providing access from Radbrook Road.
