= Geoffrey Othen =

English cricketer

Personal information
- Full name: Geoffrey Victor Othen
- Born: 12 March 1933; Shrewsbury, Shropshire, England
- Died: September 2015 (aged 82); Bicton, Shrewsbury, Shropshire, England
- Batting: Right-handed
- Bowling: Right-arm medium

Domestic team information
- Years: Team
- 1957–1976: Shropshire

Career statistics
| Competition | List A |
|---|---|
| Matches | 2 |
| Runs scored | 4 |
| Batting average | 2.00 |
| 100s/50s | –/– |
| Top score | 3 |
| Balls bowled | 120 |
| Wickets | 4 |
| Bowling average | 17.25 |
| 5 wickets in innings | – |
| 10 wickets in match | – |
| Best bowling | 4/34 |
| Catches/stumpings | –/– |
- Source: Cricinfo, 4 July 2011

Geoffrey Victor Othen (12 March 1933 – September 2015) was an English cricketer. Othen was a right-handed batsman who bowled right-arm medium pace. He was born in Shrewsbury, Shropshire, where he was educated at the Priory Grammar School for Boys.

Othen made his debut for Shropshire in the 1957 Minor Counties Championship against Staffordshire. Othen played Minor counties cricket for Shropshire from 1957 to 1976, which included 143 Minor Counties Championship appearances. He captained Shropshire to their first, and so far only, Minor Counties Championship title in 1973. After retiring from the game in 1976 he was chairman of the club until 1985. He played club cricket for Monkmoor (Shrewsbury), Wroxeter and Wem.

He made his List A debut against Essex in the 1974 Gillette Cup. In this match, took 4 wickets for the cost of 34 runs from 12 overs. He made a further List A appearance against Yorkshire in the 1976 Gillette Cup. He bowled 8 wicket-less overs in this match, for the cost of 35 runs.

Othen was also a keen golf player who served as captain in 1996-97 and president in 2008 of Shrewsbury Golf Club.

He worked as a telephone engineer. He and his wife Rosemary, who died in 1993, had a daughter and a son. He died of cancer in September 2015 at Severn Hospice in Bicton, Shrewsbury and was cremated at Emstrey Crematorium, Shrewsbury.
