= Shrewsbury Sixth Form College =

Shrewsbury College

Location
- Priory Road; Shrewsbury, Shropshire, SY1 1RX; England; 52.70889°N 2.76028°W

Information
- Type: Sixth Form College
- Established: 1981; 45 years ago
- Local authority: Shropshire Council
- Department for Education URN: 130800 Tables
- Ofsted: Reports
- Chairman: Roger Wilson
- Principal: James Staniforth
- Staff: c.140
- Gender: Co-educational
- Age: 16 to 19
- Enrolment: c.1,650 (9,450 inc. Shrewsbury College)
- Colours: Blue, White, Black
- Website: www.scg.ac.uk

Shrewsbury College was a post-secondary co-educational sixth-form college located in Shrewsbury, the county town of Shropshire, England. The college currently had as of 2007 an enrolment of approximately 1,650 students, generally ranging between the ages of 16 and 19. The curriculum consisted of AS, A levels and a small range of BTECs. GCSE English Language and Maths could only be taken alongside an A level programme as resits. The college was ranked as the 17th-best sixth-form college in 2012 (out of 400 institutions), had the best A-Level performance of any state-funded institution in Shropshire, and was awarded 'Beacon Status'. The college's Welsh Bridge campus included buildings of Grade II-listed status originally built in 1910 to house the Priory Grammar School for Boys.

== History ==
Shrewsbury Sixth Form College was founded in 1981 and has developed into one of the top sixth forms in the country.

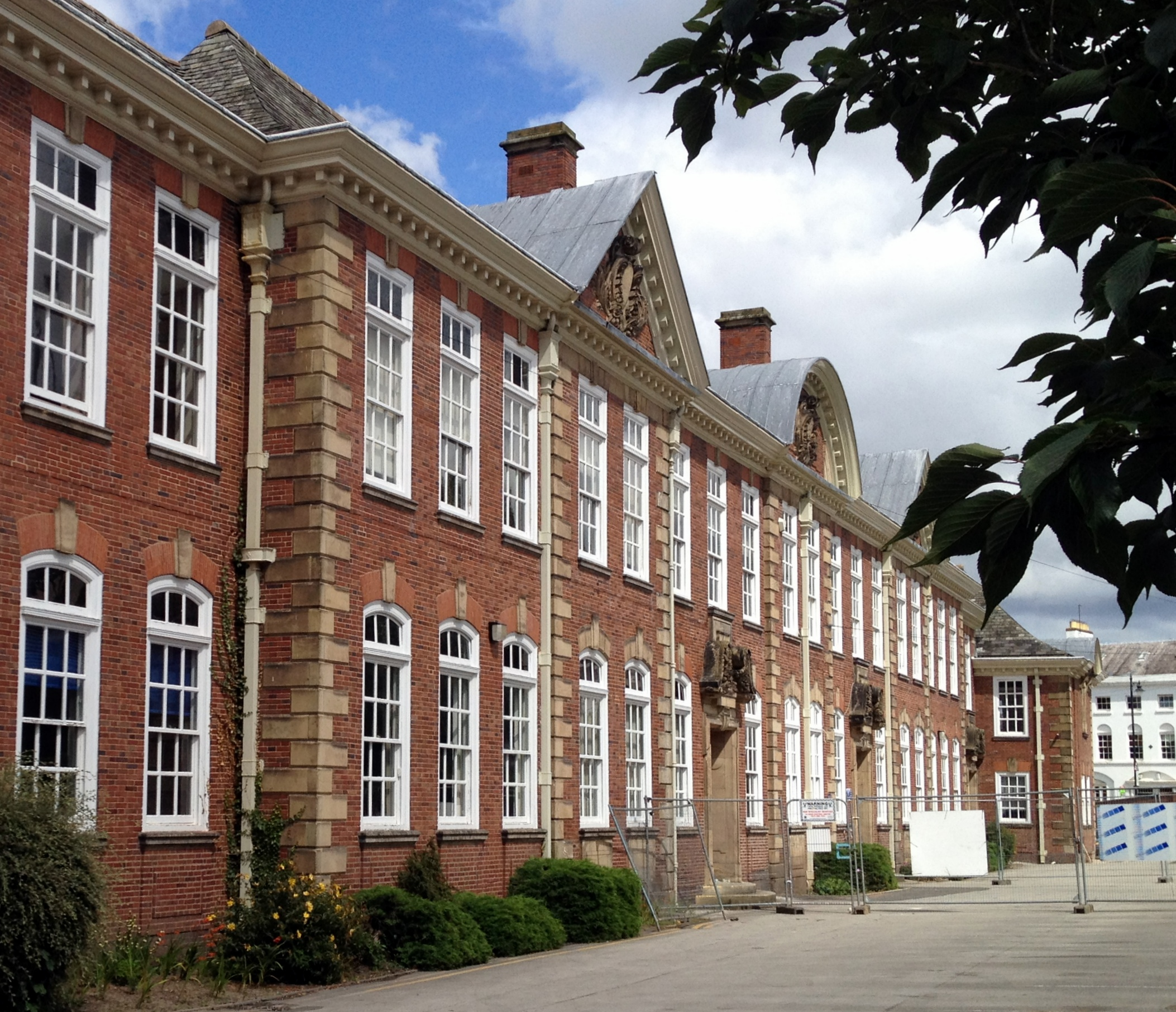
The Grade II listed main building, built in 1910, as viewed from Claremont Bank.

The college was at the top of the sixth-form college league tables for both AS and A2 level results for many years. Nationally the college was rated as 12th- and 27th-best in 2004 and 2005, respectively, with students having an average of 305.1 UCAS points (approximately ABB/ABC at A-Level) in 2004. In 2009 AS level pass rates were at 94.7%, with 66% achieving grades A-C. For A2 level in the same period, pass levels were up to 98.7%, with 79% achieving A-C grades. In the 2010 rankings, the college had the second best A-Level performance in Shropshire, after Concord College, superseding William Brookes School, Shrewsbury School and Shrewsbury High School. In 2012, the college ranked well in The Sunday Times Schools Guide; performing well against both state and fee-paying schools, the college placed 17th nationally. In 2013, the college achieved a 98% pass rate, with more than half of the students obtaining A*-B grades.

SSFC performed well against local fee-paying schools, with the average A/AS points per student at 852, versus 873 for Shrewsbury School and 876 for Shrewsbury High School. This was higher than both the Local Authority (738) and national (731) results, and for comparison, nearby Shrewsbury College of Arts and Technology achieves a score of 574. In 2009 the college surpassed Shrewsbury School, becoming the third best A-Level institution in Shropshire after Concord College and Shrewsbury High School.

Many students went on to study at Russell Group universities. In 2013 and 2014 respectively, six and seven students were offered places at Oxford or Cambridge.

=== Proposed Co-Location ===
In November 2004 the college and nearby Shrewsbury College of Arts and Technology announced plans to relocate and build a combined campus, with Shrewsbury College's existing London Road site earmarked as a potential location. The colleges claimed that existing property "lacks modern facilities and is, in some cases, not fit for purpose". The college's then-principal, Bill Dowell, wrote in the Shropshire Star declaring that "co-location is in the very best interests of the students".

The proposals were met with resistance - with business owners in the town centre objecting the proposals early on; the local MP Daniel Kawczynski's opposed the proposals (including a brief discussion in Parliament); student protests (joined by the local MP); and public consultations. The colleges branded the local MP a "chief difficulty" for his opposition to their proposals.

In November 2008, nearly 4 years after the colleges announced their plans, Shrewsbury and Atcham borough council voted against the proposals 11 to 2. Shortly after the college formally withdrew from proposals and were "revisiting other options".

=== Merger ===
In November 2015 the college alongside Shrewsbury College and New College, Telford announced a proposal to merge, in which each college would retain its own principal, "individual culture", and students would continue to apply to each college separately. In February 2016 public consultation began where the proposed name of the combined college was announced to be "Central Shropshire Colleges Group".

In April 2016 following public consultation, New College backed out and proceeded with a separate merger with Telford College of Arts and Technology; the college and Shrewsbury College continued with their merger to occur on 31 July 2016 with the name "Shrewsbury Colleges Group".

In July 2016 the college merged with Shrewsbury College (based on London Road) to form the Shrewsbury Colleges Group.

In the merged college's first Ofsted report, the college scored Inadequate in both "Behaviour and attitudes" and "Leadership and management" with the remaining scored at Good. The college attempted to, unsuccessfully, overturn the report before it was published - with Ofsted upholding the grading upon their revisit.

Name Change

In 2025, the Shrewsbury Colleges Group changed its name to Shrewsbury College, effective from 1 August 2025.

== Campuses ==
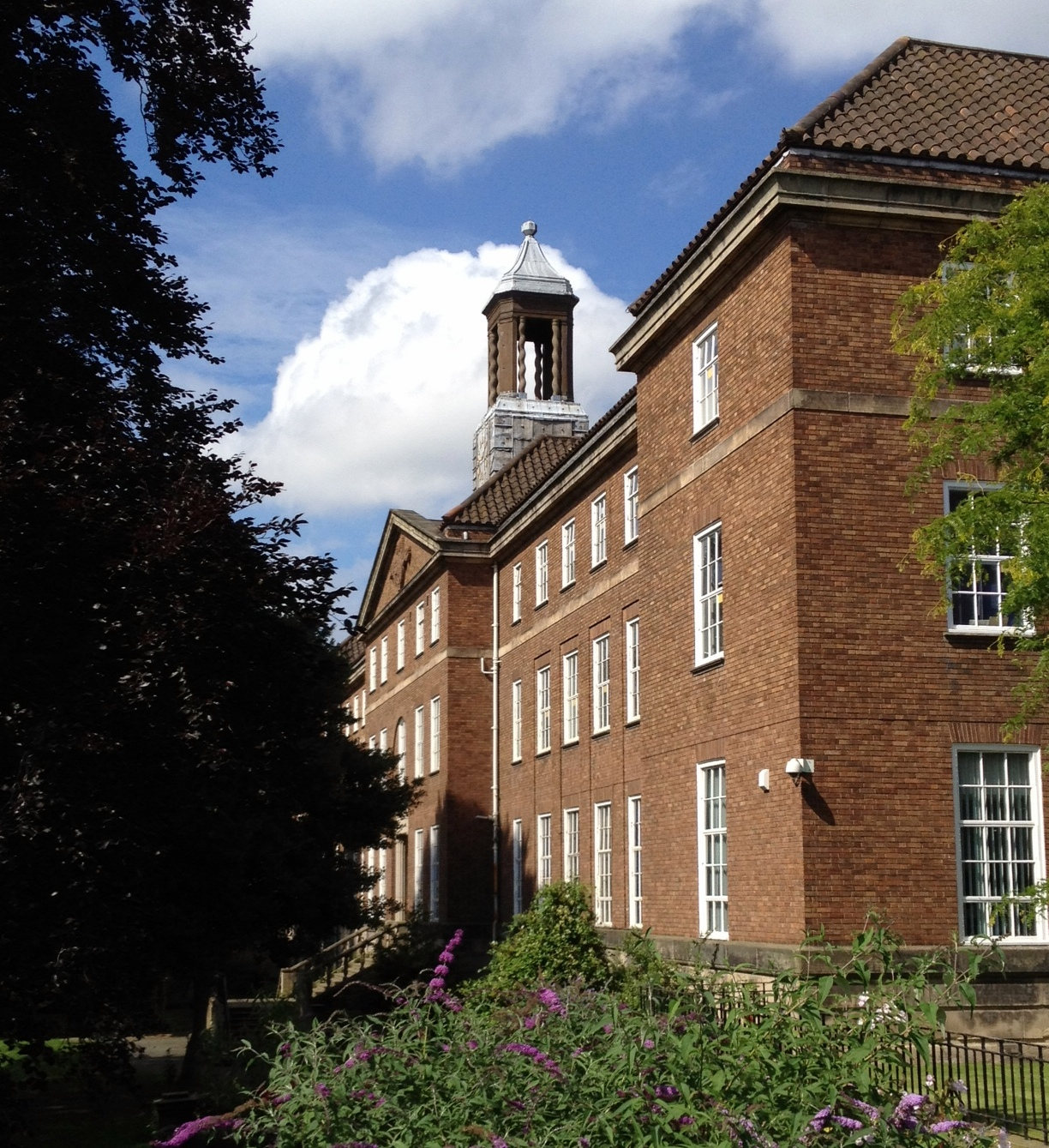
The college's Wakeman site, acquired in 2013 following the closure of Wakeman School.

The college was located on the banks of the River Severn. The Welsh Bridge Campus occupied the main and ancillary buildings of the former Priory Grammar School for Boys (itself built on the site of a medieval Augustinian friary).

English Bridge Campus (Abbey Foregate) – comprising Wakeman Hall and sports fields – Courses: Art & Design including Food Technology, Sport & PE, Humanities (English, Classical Civilisation, Religious Studies, Politics & History), Health & Social Care, Music & Dramatic Arts.

Welsh Bridge Campus (Priory Road) – comprising Austin, Priory Hall, Priory House, Quarry, Severn – Courses: Work Applied subjects (Business, ICT, Computer Science, Law & Economics), Social Science (Sociology, Geography, Psychology), Sciences, including electronics, Modern Foreign Languages, and Maths.

== Students ==
The college had approximately 1,650 students in 2007. It was the sixth form for the following schools: Shrewsbury Academy (formally The Grange and Sundorne schools), Priory School, Meole Brace School, Belvidere School, Corbet School, Mary Webb School and Science College and Church Stretton School. Students from outside the 'partner schools' (listed above) were also accepted. Students in Shropshire are additionally able to go to other sixth-form colleges, which exist in Oswestry, Ludlow and Telford.

A-Level performance was comparable to the nearby independent fee-paying Shrewsbury School and Shrewsbury High School, resulting in a noticeable presence of previously independent-school students at the college. Female students outnumbered male students. The percentage of students from a minority ethnic heritage was small, mirroring the profile in the locality.

== Notable alumni ==
- Nick Beighton - British army officer and paracanoeist
- Colin Bloomfield - British radio broadcaster
- Suzanne Evans - British journalist and politician

== See also ==
- Listed buildings in Shrewsbury (northwest central area)
