= Shrewsbury College =

Location
- London Road; Shrewsbury, Shropshire, SY2 6PR; England
- 52°41′49″N 2°43′23″W

Information
- Local authority: Shropshire
- Department for Education URN: 130800 Tables
- Ofsted: Reports
- Principal: James Staniforth
- Staff: 650
- Age: 16+
- Enrolment: 4,000 (full time) and 6,000 (part time)
- Telephone: 01743 653 000
- Website: www.shrewsbury.ac.uk

Shrewsbury College is a further education college in Shrewsbury, Shropshire, England. The college is Shropshire's largest provider of post-16 education, teaching 70% of all 16-18 students in the county. The college operates from three campuses. The English Bridge and Welsh Bridge campuses offers over 35 A Level courses between them. The London Road Campus offers technical and professional vocational courses as well as Higher Education provision.

On 1 August 2025, the college changed its name to Shrewsbury College, after previously being known as Shrewsbury Colleges Group. This group was formed in August 2016 through the merger of Shrewsbury Sixth Form College and Shrewsbury College (of Arts & Technology).

The college is the sixth form for seven schools in Shrewsbury and rural Shropshire and works with approximately 10,000 students each year.

The college has excellent links and partnerships with over 600 local, regional, and national companies as well as international organisations, providing opportunities for work experience, placements, apprenticeships, and employment.

The college was rated as Outstanding by Ofsted in March 2025.

== Academic offerings ==
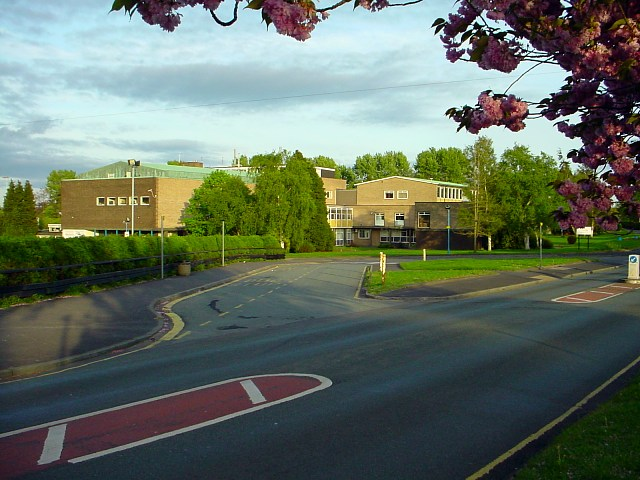
The main campus at London Road

The college is the largest college in Shropshire with the widest choice of courses available for school leavers to study.

The college also offers a huge range of other courses, including apprenticeships, degree-level courses, Distance Learning, free numeracy and literacy courses, T Levels and vocational diplomas and part-time professional development and hobby courses.

== University partnership ==
The college has a partnership with Staffordshire University for areas of the curriculum including computing science, counselling theory and practice, electrical and electronic technology, manufacturing technology, mechanical technology and sports coaching and physical education.

The college is a founder member of the Staffordshire University Regional Federation (SURF Consortium). It also holds an annual Higher Awards Ceremony in St Chad's Church, Shrewsbury.

== History ==
The college traces its origins to the Radbrook campus, which was in use up until 2014, when it was sold to a developer to be turned into luxury housing. The Radbrook site was home to Shropshire Technical School for Girls, founded around 1895 and later known as "Shropshire College of Domestic Science and Dairy Work" and then "Radbrook College of Agriculture". It amalgamated with other institutions and became a campus of Shrewsbury College of Arts and Technology.

=== Merger ===
In 2016, Shrewsbury College of Arts and Technology merged with Shrewsbury Sixth Form College to form the Shrewsbury Colleges Group. Together, the college offers academic and vocational courses from three campuses across Shrewsbury. The college changed its name to Shrewsbury College in September 2025.

The college is currently rated as 'Outstanding' by Ofsted in its most recent report in March 2025.

In the merged college's first Ofsted report, the college scored Inadequate in both "Behaviour and attitudes" and "Leadership and management" with the remaining scored at Good. The college attempted to, unsuccessfully, overturn the report before it was published - with Ofsted upholding the grading upon their revisit.

=== Name Change ===
In 2025, Shrewsbury Colleges Group announced that it would be changing its name to Shrewsbury College, effective from 1 August 2025.
