= 2013–14 Manchester City F.C. season =

English football club season

Manchester City
2013–14 season
- Owner: City Football Group
- Chairman: Khaldoon Al Mubarak
- Manager: Manuel Pellegrini
- Stadium: Etihad Stadium
- Premier League: 1st
- FA Cup: Sixth round
- League Cup: Winners
- UEFA Champions League: Round of 16
- Top goalscorer: League: Yaya Touré (20); All: Sergio Agüero (28)
- Highest home attendance: 47,364 vs. Chelsea (3 February 2014)
- Lowest home attendance: 46,559 vs. Swansea City (1 December 2013)
Home colours	Away colours	Third colours

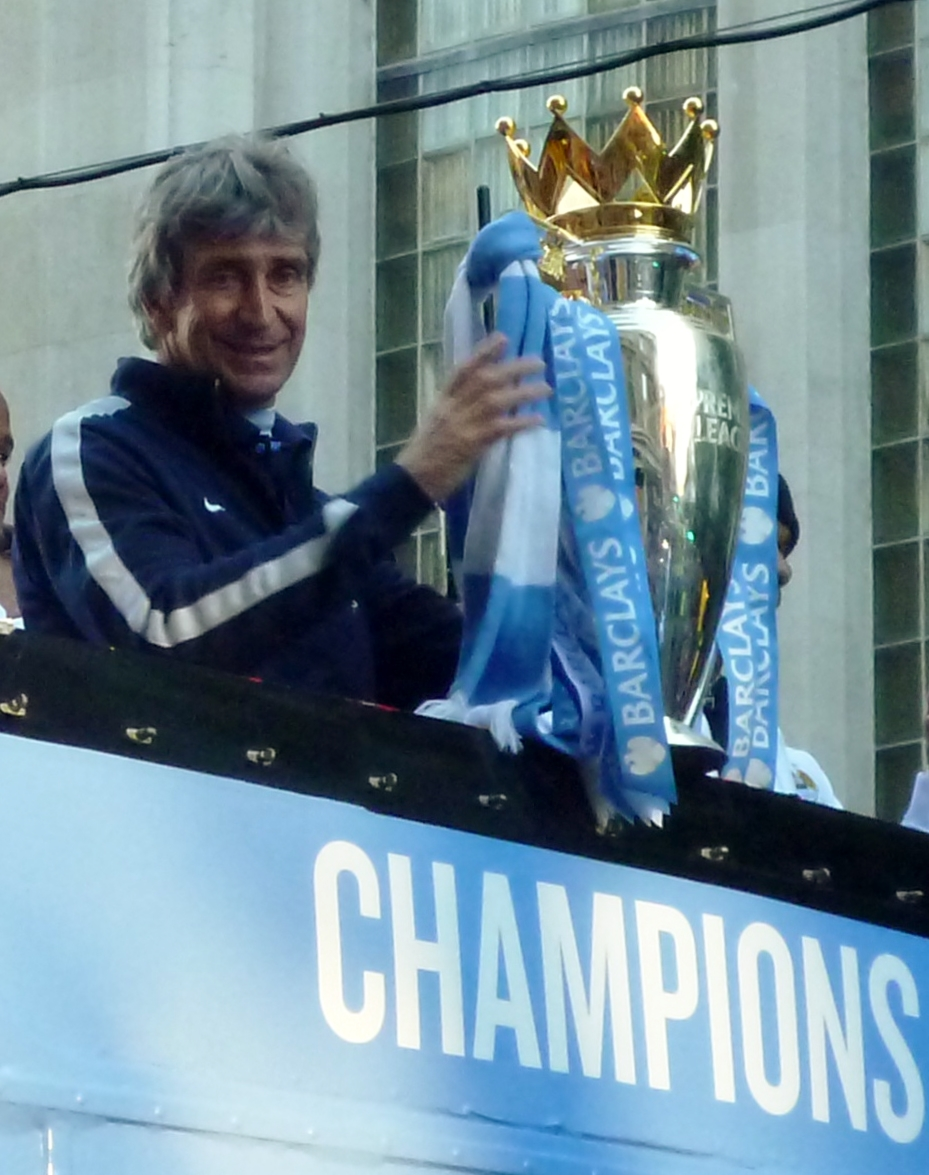
Manuel Pellegrini with the Premier League trophy during the club's victory parade, May 2014.

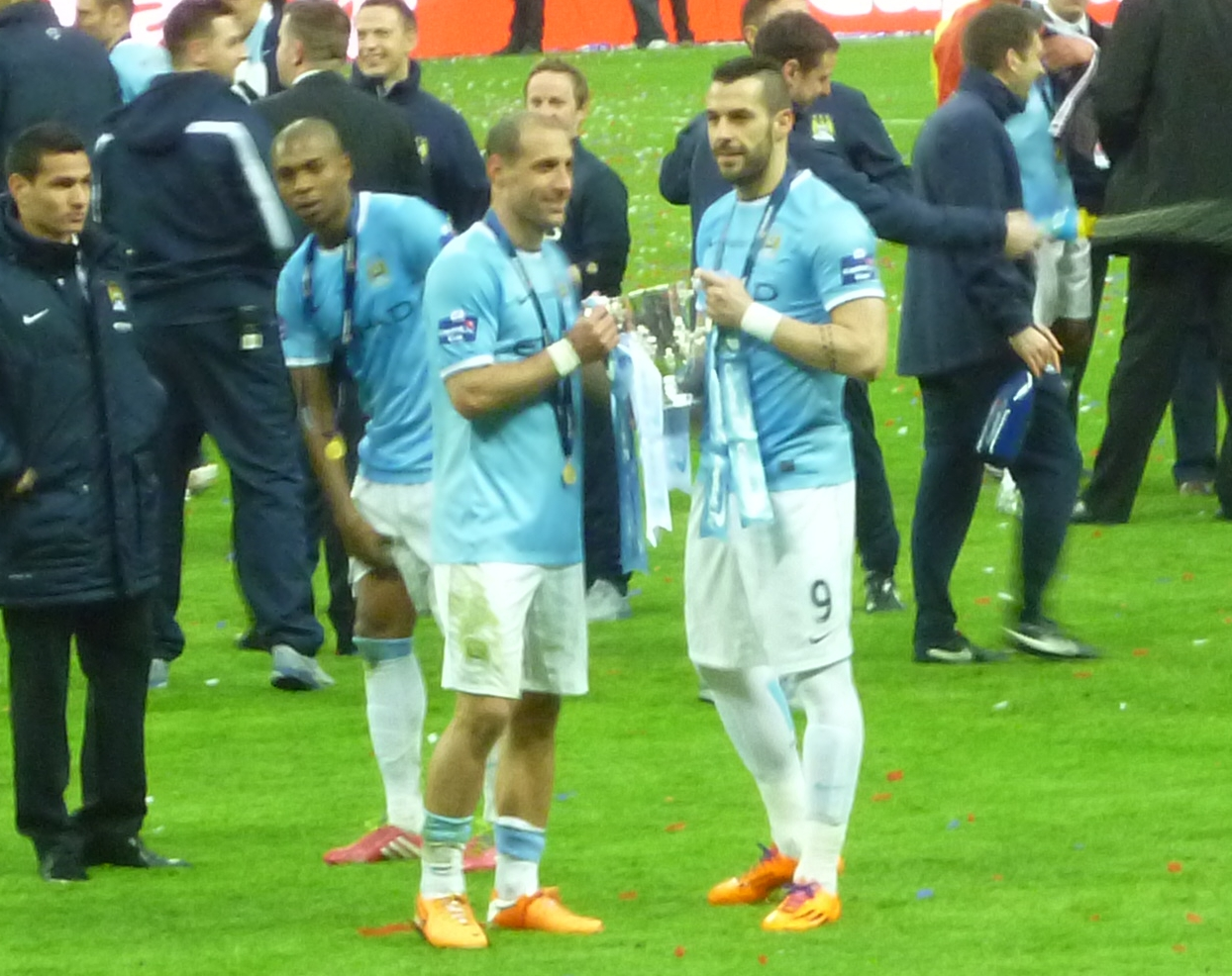
Pablo Zabaleta and Álvaro Negredo hold the League Cup trophy after City's victory in the Capital One Cup final.

The 2013–14 season was Manchester City Football Club's 112th season of competitive football, 85th season in the top flight of English football and 17th season in the Premier League.

City became the fastest club in Premier League history to score 100 competitive goals in all competitions and the first to complete this feat before the end of January. They went on to score 156 goals in all competitions, breaking the previous record of 143 goals set by Manchester United in 1956–57. City's 100th Premier League goal of the season was scored in the 4–0 victory over Aston Villa on 7 May 2014. This was the first time the Blues had scored more than 100 league goals in the English top division in a single season since 1957–58. Their 100th goal was the first in English league football to be decided via the "Hawk-Eye" system, which had been introduced at the start of the season.

The final tally of 102 league goals was at the time the second-highest Premier League season total and one goal short of Chelsea's 2009–10 record. This was also the first Premier League season where a team had three individual players each score more than 15 goals, with City accomplishing the feat courtesy of Yaya Touré, Sergio Agüero and Edin Džeko.

The 2013–14 season marked the first time City advanced to the round of 16 of the UEFA Champions League. There, the Blues were defeated by Barcelona 4–1 on aggregate. City also recorded their first silverware of the Manuel Pellegrini era on 2 March 2014, when they lifted the Football League Cup. It was the club's first triumph in the competition since 1976.

On 11 May 2014, City won the Premier League for the second time in three seasons following a 2–0 win over West Ham United. It was the first time that Manchester City had won two trophies in a season since 1969–70, when they won the League Cup and the Cup Winners' Cup.

== Club ==
=== Coaching staff ===
Position	Staff
Manager	Manuel Pellegrini
Assistant managers	Brian Kidd; Rubén Cousillas
Goalkeeping coach	Xabier Mancisidor
Fitness coach	José Cabello
Physiotherapist	Lee Nobles
Club doctor	Dr. Max Sala

=== Kits ===
The club's kits were supplied by Nike. City's principal sponsor for this year was again Etihad Airways.

Home	Home alt.	Away	Away UCL	Third	Third alt.	Goalkeeper 1	Goalkeeper 2	Goalkeeper 3	Goalkeeper 4

=== Kit information ===
The club signed a new deal with the American manufacturer Nike, who would supply their kits for the next six years (until 2019).

- Home: The new home kit featured a classical design with a round crew neck and sleeve cuffs, trimmed in white and navy. The shorts were white with sky blue trimmings, while the socks were white for the first time since 2009.
- Away: The away kit featured a black and charcoal half design, embellished with golden sponsor logos. The shorts and socks were black.
- Third: The third kit was predominantly white with a single sky blue and navy stripe on the right hand side. The shorts and socks were navy with sky blue accents.
- Keeper: There were four goalkeeper kits used throughout the season. They were based on Nike's premium goalkeeper template, which featured two tones of the same colour. The first choice kit was in two tones of green, whilst the alternatives were purple, yellow and black respectively.

=== Kit usage ===
Kit	Description	Usage
Home	Sky blue body with white shorts and socks.	Used in all home games and away against Cardiff City, Stoke City, Sunderland, West Brom, Southampton, Newcastle, Tottenham, Norwich City, Hull City, Manchester United and Liverpool.
Home alt.	Sky blue body with sky blue shorts and navy socks.	Used away against Fulham and Arsenal.
Away	Black and grey halved shirt with black shorts and socks.	Used away against Aston Villa, West Ham (PL), Chelsea, Swansea City, Blackburn Rovers and Crystal Palace.
Away UCL	White body with white shorts and socks.	Used in all Champions League away games.
Third	White body with navy shorts and socks.	Used away against Everton and West Ham (LC).
Third alt.	White body with navy shorts and white socks.	Used once away against Leicester City.

== Non-competitive ==
=== Pre-season ===
==== Football Invitational in support of Mandela Day ====
14 July 2013 Friendly	SuperSport United	2–0	Manchester City	Pretoria, South Africa
15:00 SAST (UTC+02:00)	Niang 56'; Erasmus 82'	Report		Stadium: Loftus Versfeld Stadium; Attendance: 18,700

18 July 2013 Friendly	AmaZulu	2–1	Manchester City	Durban, South Africa
20:00 SAST (UTC+02:00)	Ndulula 20'; Nyadombo 89' (pen.)	Report	Milner 26'	Stadium: Moses Mabhida Stadium; Attendance: 25,000; Referee: Daniel Bennett

==== Premier League Asia Trophy ====
24 July 2013 Semi-final	South China	0–1	Manchester City	So Kon Po, Hong Kong
20:30 HKT (UTC+08:00)		Report	Džeko 22'	Stadium: Hong Kong Stadium; Attendance: 35,950; Referee: Anthony Taylor (England)

27 July 2013 Final	Manchester City	1–0	Sunderland	So Kon Po, Hong Kong
20:30 HKT (UTC+08:00)	Džeko 8'	Report		Stadium: Hong Kong Stadium; Attendance: 37,433; Referee: Anthony Taylor (England)

==== Audi Cup ====
31 July 2013 Semi-final	Manchester City	5–3	Milan	Munich, Germany
18:15 CET (UTC+01:00)	Silva 3'; Richards 19'; Kolarov 22'; Džeko 32', 36'	Report	El Shaarawy 37', 39'; Petagna 43'	Stadium: Allianz Arena; Attendance: 52,000; Referee: Peter Sippel

1 August 2013 Final	Bayern Munich	2–1	Manchester City	Munich, Germany
20:30 CET (UTC+01:00)	Müller 66' (pen.); Mandžukić 71'	Report	Negredo 60'	Attendance: 68,000; Referee: Wolfgang Stark

==== Super Match by Carlsberg ====
10 August 2013	Manchester City	1–3	Arsenal	Helsinki, Finland
17:00 EET (UTC+02:00)	Negredo 79'	Report	Walcott 8'; Ramsey 58'; Giroud 61'	Stadium: Helsinki Olympic Stadium

=== Post-season ===
==== Friendlies ====
15 May 2014	Al Ain FC	0–3	Manchester City	Al Ain, United Arab Emirates
19:50		Report	Lopes 63'; Jovetić 79'; Hiwula 89' (pen.)	Stadium: Hazza Bin Zayed Stadium; Referee: Mohammed Abdulkarim

== Competitions ==
=== Overall ===
Competition	Started round	Final position / round	First match	Last match
Premier League	—	Winners	19 August 2013	11 May 2014
League Cup	Third round	Winners	24 September 2013	2 March 2014
FA Cup	Third round	Sixth round	4 January 2014	9 March 2014
UEFA Champions League	Group stage	Round of 16	17 September 2013	12 March 2014

Updated to match played 11 May 2014
Source: Competitions

=== Premier League ===
==== League table ====
Pos	Team	Pld	W	D	L	GF	GA	GD	Pts	Qualification or relegation
1	Manchester City (C)	38	27	5	6	102	37	+65	86	Qualification for the Champions League group stage
2	Liverpool	38	26	6	6	101	50	+51	84	Qualification for the Champions League group stage
3	Chelsea	38	25	7	6	71	27	+44	82	Qualification for the Champions League group stage
4	Arsenal	38	24	7	7	68	41	+27	79	Qualification for the Champions League play-off round
5	Everton	38	21	9	8	61	39	+22	72	Qualification for the Europa League group stage

Source: Barclays Premier League
Rules for classification: 1) Points; 2) Goal difference; 3) Goals scored; 4) Play-offs (only if needed to decide champion, teams for relegation or teams for UEFA competitions).
(C) Champions

==== Results summary ====
Overall								Home						Away					
Pld	W	D	L	GF	GA	GD	Pts	W	D	L	GF	GA	GD	W	D	L	GF	GA	GD
38	27	5	6	102	37	+65	86	17	1	1	63	13	+50	10	4	5	39	24	+15

Last updated: 11 May 2014.
Source: Premier League

==== Points breakdown ====
- Points at home: 52
- Points away: 34
- Points against 2012–13 top four: 10
- Points against promoted teams: 15
- 6 points: Crystal Palace, Everton, Fulham, Hull City, Manchester United, Newcastle, Swansea City, Tottenham, West Brom and West Ham United.
- 4 points: Arsenal, Norwich City, Southampton and Stoke City.
- 3 points: Aston Villa, Cardiff City and Liverpool.
- 1 point: Sunderland.
- No points: Chelsea.

==== Biggest win & loss results ====
- Biggest home win: 7–0 vs. Norwich (2 November 2013)
- Biggest and the only home defeat: 0–1 vs. Chelsea, (3 February 2014)
- Biggest away win: 5–1 vs. Tottenham (29 January 2014)
- Biggest away defeat: 5 by a 1-goal margin.

Biggest home attendance: 47,364 vs. Chelsea, 3 February 2014
Smallest home attendance: 46,559 vs. Swansea City, 1 December 2013
Biggest away attendance: 75,203 vs. Manchester United, 25 March 2014
Smallest away attendance: 20,498 vs. Swansea City, 1 January 2014

==== Results by matchday ====
Matchday	1	2	3	4	5	6	7	8	9	10	11	12	13	14	15	16	17	18	19	20	21	22	23	24	25	26	27	28	29	30	31	32	33	34	35	36	37	38
Ground	H	A	H	A	H	A	H	A	A	H	A	H	H	A	A	H	A	H	H	A	A	H	A	H	A	H	A	H	A	A	H	A	H	H	A	A	H	H
Result	W	L	W	D	W	L	W	W	L	W	L	W	W	W	D	W	W	W	W	W	W	W	W	L	D	W	W	W	W	D	W	L	D	W	W	W	W	W
Position	1	6	2	4	3	5	3	4	7	4	8	4	3	3	4	3	2	2	2	2	2	2	2	2	3	3	2	3	2	3	3	3	3	3	3	3	1	1

Updated to match(es) played on 11 May 2014. Source: Statto.com
A = Away; H = Home; W = Win; D = Draw; L = Loss

==== Matches ====
19 August 2013 1	Manchester City	4–0	Newcastle United	Manchester
20:00 BST	Silva 6'; Agüero 22'; Džeko (yellow card) 31'; Fernandinho (yellow card) 32'; Touré 51'; Nasri 75'	Report	Yanga-Mbiwa (yellow card) 31'; Sissoko (yellow card) 33'; Debuchy (yellow card) 40'; Taylor (red card) 45'	Stadium: Etihad Stadium; Attendance: 46,842; Referee: Andre Marriner

25 August 2013 2	Cardiff City	3–2	Manchester City	Cardiff
16:00 BST	Gunnarsson 60'; Campbell 79', 87'	Report	Džeko 52'; Negredo 90+2'	Stadium: Cardiff City Stadium; Attendance: 27,068; Referee: Lee Probert

31 August 2013 3	Manchester City	2–0	Hull City	Manchester
12:45 BST	Fernandinho (yellow card) 23'; Nastasić (yellow card) 60'; Negredo 65'; Touré 90'	Report	Figueroa (yellow card) 22'; Koren (yellow card) 63'; Davies (yellow card) 73'	Stadium: Etihad Stadium; Attendance: 46,903; Referee: Phil Dowd

14 September 2013 4	Stoke City	0–0	Manchester City	Stoke-on-Trent
15:00 BST	García (yellow card) 54'	Report	Walters (yellow card) 90+2'	Stadium: Britannia Stadium; Attendance: 25,052; Referee: Mark Clattenburg

22 September 2013 5	Manchester City	4–1	Manchester United	Manchester
16:00 BST	Agüero 16', 47'; Touré 45+1'; Nasri 50'	Report	Rooney 87'	Stadium: Etihad Stadium; Attendance: 47,156; Referee: Howard Webb

28 September 2013 6	Aston Villa	3–2	Manchester City	Birmingham
15:00 BST	El Ahmadi 51'; Bacuna 73'; Weimann 75'	Report	Touré 45'; Džeko 56'	Stadium: Villa Park; Attendance: 34,063; Referee: Mike Jones

5 October 2013 7	Manchester City	3–1	Everton	Manchester
12:45 BST	Negredo 17'; Agüero 45'; Howard 69' (o.g.)	Report	Lukaku 16'	Stadium: Etihad Stadium; Attendance: 47,267; Referee: Jonathan Moss

19 October 2013 8	West Ham United	1–3	Manchester City	London
17:30 BST	Vaz Tê 58'	Report	Agüero 16', 51'; Silva 80'	Stadium: Boleyn Ground; Attendance: 34,507; Referee: Michael Oliver

27 October 2013 9	Chelsea	2–1	Manchester City	London
16:00 GMT	Schürrle 33'; Lampard (yellow card) 22'; Ramires (yellow card) 51'; Torres 90'	Report	Zabaleta (yellow card) 27'; Nastasić (yellow card) 31'; Agüero 49'; García (yellow card) 60'	Stadium: Stamford Bridge; Attendance: 41,495; Referee: Howard Webb

2 November 2013 10	Manchester City	7–0	Norwich City	Manchester
15:00 GMT	Johnson 16' (o.g.); Silva 20'; Martin 25' (o.g.); Negredo 36'; Touré 60'; Agüero 71'; Džeko 86'	Report		Stadium: Etihad Stadium; Attendance: 47,066; Referee: Phil Dowd

10 November 2013 11	Sunderland	1–0	Manchester City	Sunderland, Tyne and Wear
14:05 GMT	Bardsley 21'	Report		Stadium: Stadium of Light; Attendance: 40,137; Referee: Mike Dean

24 November 2013 12	Manchester City	6–0	Tottenham Hotspur	Manchester
13:30 GMT	Navas 1', 90+2'; Sandro 34' (o.g.); Agüero 41', 50'; Negredo 55'	Report		Stadium: Etihad Stadium; Attendance: 47,228; Referee: Howard Webb

1 December 2013 13	Manchester City	3–0	Swansea City	Manchester
16:10 GMT	Negredo 8'; Nasri 58', 77'	Report		Stadium: Etihad Stadium; Attendance: 46,559; Referee: Mark Clattenburg

4 December 2013 14	West Bromwich Albion	2–3	Manchester City	West Bromwich
20:00 GMT	Pantilimon 85' (o.g.); Anichebe 90+4'	Report	Agüero 9'; Touré 24', 74' (pen.)	Stadium: The Hawthorns; Attendance: 22,943; Referee: Chris Foy

7 December 2013 15	Southampton	1–1	Manchester City	Southampton
15:00 GMT	Osvaldo 42'	Report	Agüero 10'	Stadium: St Mary's Stadium; Attendance: 31,229; Referee: Anthony Taylor

14 December 2013 16	Manchester City	6–3	Arsenal	Manchester
12:45 GMT	Agüero 14'; Negredo 39'; Fernandinho 50', 88'; Silva 66'; Touré 90+6' (pen.)	Report	Walcott 31', 63'; Mertesacker 90+4'	Stadium: Etihad Stadium; Attendance: 47,229; Referee: Martin Atkinson

21 December 2013 17	Fulham	2–4	Manchester City	London
15:00 GMT	Richardson 50'; Kompany 69' (o.g.)	Report	Touré 23'; Kompany 43'; Navas 78'; Milner 83'	Stadium: Craven Cottage; Attendance: 25,509; Referee: Kevin Friend

26 December 2013 18	Manchester City	2–1	Liverpool	Manchester
17:30 GMT	Kompany 31'; Negredo 45+1'	Report	Coutinho 24'	Stadium: Etihad Stadium; Attendance: 47,351; Referee: Lee Mason

28 December 2013 19	Manchester City	1–0	Crystal Palace	Manchester
15:00 GMT	Džeko 66'	Report		Stadium: Etihad Stadium; Attendance: 47,107; Referee: Andre Marriner

1 January 2014 20	Swansea City	2–3	Manchester City	Swansea
12:45 GMT	Bony 45+2', 90+1'	Report	Fernandinho 14'; Touré 58'; Kolarov 66'	Stadium: Liberty Stadium; Attendance: 20,498; Referee: Phil Dowd

12 January 2014 21	Newcastle United	0–2	Manchester City	Newcastle upon Tyne
14:05 GMT		Report	Džeko 8'; Negredo 90+5'	Stadium: St James' Park; Attendance: 49,423; Referee: Mike Jones

18 January 2014 22	Manchester City	4–2	Cardiff City	Manchester
15:00 GMT	Džeko 14'; Navas 33'; Touré 76'; Agüero 79'	Report	Noone 29'; Campbell 90+3'	Stadium: Etihad Stadium; Attendance: 47,213; Referee: Neil Swarbrick

29 January 2014 23	Tottenham Hotspur	1–5	Manchester City	London
19:45 GMT	Capoue 59'	Report	Agüero 15'; Touré 51' (pen.); Džeko 53'; Jovetić 78'; Kompany 89'	Stadium: White Hart Lane; Attendance: 36,071; Referee: Andre Marriner

3 February 2014 24	Manchester City	0–1	Chelsea	Manchester
20:00 GMT		Report	Ivanović 32'	Stadium: Etihad Stadium; Attendance: 47,364; Referee: Mike Dean

8 February 2014 25	Norwich City	0–0	Manchester City	Norwich
15:00 GMT		Report		Stadium: Carrow Road; Attendance: 26,832; Referee: Jonathan Moss

22 February 2014 26	Manchester City	1–0	Stoke City	Manchester
15:00 GMT	Touré 70'	Report		Stadium: Etihad Stadium; Attendance: 47,038; Referee: Chris Foy

15 March 2014 27	Hull City	0–2	Manchester City	Hull
12:45 GMT		Report	Silva 14'; Džeko 90'	Stadium: KC Stadium; Attendance: 24,895; Referee: Lee Mason

22 March 2014 28	Manchester City	5–0	Fulham	Manchester
15:00 GMT	Touré 26' (pen.), 54' (pen.), 65'; Fernandinho 84'; Demichelis 88'	Report		Stadium: Etihad Stadium; Attendance: 47,262; Referee: Jonathan Moss

25 March 2014 29	Manchester United	0–3	Manchester City	Manchester
19:45 BST		Report	Džeko 1', 56'; Touré 90'	Stadium: Old Trafford; Attendance: 75,203; Referee: Michael Oliver

29 March 2014 30	Arsenal	1–1	Manchester City	London
17:30 BST	Flamini 53'	Report	Silva 18'	Stadium: Emirates Stadium; Attendance: 60,060; Referee: Mike Dean

5 April 2014 31	Manchester City	4–1	Southampton	Manchester
12:45 BST	Touré 3' (pen.); Nasri 45+1'; Džeko 45+4'; Jovetić 81'	Report	Lambert 37' (pen.)	Stadium: Etihad Stadium; Attendance: 47,009; Referee: Chris Foy

13 April 2014 32	Liverpool	3–2	Manchester City	Liverpool
13:37 BST	Suárez (yellow card) 5'; Sterling 6'; Škrtel 26'; Coutinho 78'; Henderson (red card) 90+3'	Report	García (yellow card) 21'; Fernandinho (yellow card) 46'; Silva 57'; Johnson 62' (o.g.); Zabaleta (yellow card) 77'	Stadium: Anfield; Attendance: 44,601; Referee: Mark Clattenburg

16 April 2014 33	Manchester City	2–2	Sunderland	Manchester
19:45 BST	Fernandinho 2'; Nasri 88'	Report	Wickham 73', 83'	Stadium: Etihad Stadium; Attendance: 47,046; Referee: Martin Atkinson

21 April 2014 34	Manchester City	3–1	West Bromwich Albion	Manchester
20:00 BST	Zabaleta 3'; Agüero 10'; Demichelis 36'	Report	Dorrans 16'	Stadium: Etihad Stadium; Attendance: 46,564; Referee: Phil Dowd

27 April 2014 35	Crystal Palace	0–2	Manchester City	London
16:10 BST		Report	Džeko 4'; Touré 43'	Stadium: Selhurst Park; Attendance: 24,769; Referee: Howard Webb

3 May 2014 36	Everton	2–3	Manchester City	Liverpool
17:30 BST	Barkley 11'; Lukaku 65'	Report	Agüero 22'; Džeko 43', 48'	Stadium: Goodison Park; Attendance: 39,454; Referee: Lee Probert

7 May 2014 37	Manchester City	4–0	Aston Villa	Manchester
19:45 BST	Džeko 64', 72'; Jovetić 89'; Touré 90+3'	Report		Stadium: Etihad Stadium; Attendance: 47,023; Referee: Michael Oliver

11 May 2014 38	Manchester City	2–0	West Ham United	Manchester
15:00 BST	Nasri 39'; Kompany 49'	Report		Stadium: Etihad Stadium; Attendance: 47,300; Referee: Martin Atkinson

=== FA Cup ===
4 January 2014 Third round	Blackburn Rovers	1–1	Manchester City	Blackburn
15:00 GMT	Dann 55'	Report	Negredo 45+1'	Stadium: Ewood Park; Attendance: 18,813; Referee: Michael Oliver

15 January 2014 Replay	Manchester City	5–0	Blackburn Rovers	Manchester
20:10 GMT	Negredo 45+1', 47'; Džeko 67', 79'; Agüero 73'	Report		Stadium: Etihad Stadium; Attendance: 35,000; Referee: Craig Pawson

25 January 2014 Fourth round	Manchester City	4–2	Watford	Manchester
15:00 GMT	Agüero 60', 79', 90+2'; Kolarov 87'	Report	Forestieri 21'; Deeney 30'	Stadium: Etihad Stadium; Attendance: 46,514; Referee: Kevin Friend

15 February 2014 Fifth round	Manchester City	2–0	Chelsea	Manchester
17:15 GMT	Jovetić 16'; Nasri 67'	Report		Stadium: Etihad Stadium; Attendance: 47,013; Referee: Phil Dowd

9 March 2014 Sixth round	Manchester City	1–2	Wigan Athletic	Manchester
16:05 GMT	Nasri 68'	Report	Gómez 27' (pen.); Perch 47'	Stadium: Etihad Stadium; Attendance: 46,824; Referee: Anthony Taylor

=== League Cup ===
24 September 2013 Third round	Manchester City	5–0	Wigan Athletic	Manchester
19:45 BST	Džeko 33'; Jovetić 60', 83'; Touré 76'; Navas 86'	Report		Stadium: Etihad Stadium; Attendance: 25,519; Referee: Kevin Friend

30 October 2013 Fourth round	Newcastle United	0–2	Manchester City	Newcastle upon Tyne
19:45 GMT		Report	Negredo 99'; Džeko 105'	Stadium: St James' Park; Attendance: 33,846; Referee: Neil Swarbrick

17 December 2013 Fifth round	Leicester City	1–3	Manchester City	Leicester
19:45 GMT	Dyer 77'	Report	Kolarov 8'; Džeko 41', 53'	Stadium: King Power Stadium; Attendance: 31,319; Referee: Roger East

8 January 2014 Semi-finals; First leg	Manchester City	6–0	West Ham United	Manchester
19:45 GMT	Negredo 12', 26', 49'; Touré 41'; Džeko 61', 89'	Report		Stadium: Etihad Stadium; Attendance: 30,381; Referee: Jonathan Moss

21 January 2014 Semi-finals; Second leg	West Ham United	0–3 (0–9 agg.)	Manchester City	London
19:45 GMT			Negredo 3', 58'; Agüero 24'	Stadium: Upton Park; Attendance: 14,390; Referee: Chris Foy

2 March 2014 Final	Manchester City	3–1	Sunderland	London
14:00 GMT	Touré 55'; Nasri 56'; Navas 90'	Report	Borini 10'	Stadium: Wembley Stadium; Attendance: 84,697; Referee: Martin Atkinson

=== UEFA Champions League ===
==== Group stage ====
Pos	Team	Pld	W	D	L	GF	GA	GD	Pts	Qualification	BAY	MCI	PLZ	CSKA
1	(Germany) Bayern Munich	6	5	0	1	17	5	+12	15 (Note: Tied on head-to-head points (3). Head-to-head goal difference: Bayern Munich +1, Manchester City −1.)	Advance to knockout phase	—	2–3	5–0	3–0
2	(England) Manchester City	6	5	0	1	18	10	+8	15	Advance to knockout phase	1–3	—	4–2	5–2
3	(Czech Republic) Viktoria Plzeň	6	1	0	5	6	17	−11	3 (Note: Tied on head-to-head points (3) and head-to-head goal difference (0). Head-to-head away goals: Viktoria Plzeň 2, CSKA Moscow 1.)	Transfer to Europa League	0–1	0–3	—	2–1
4	(Russia) CSKA Moscow	6	1	0	5	8	17	−9	3		1–3	1–2	3–2	—

Source: UEFA
Notes:

17 September 2013 1	Viktoria Plzeň (Czech Republic)	0–3	(England) Manchester City	Plzeň, Czech Republic
20:45 CEST (UTC+2:00)	Limberský (yellow card) 40'	Report	Kolarov (yellow card) 17'; Fernandinho (yellow card) 28'; Džeko 48'; Touré 53'; Agüero 58'	Stadium: Doosan Arena; Attendance: 11,000; Referee: Paolo Tagliavento (Italy); Man of the Match: Yaya Touré

2 October 2013 2	Manchester City (England)	1–3	(Germany) Bayern Munich	Manchester, England
20:45 CEST (UTC+02:00)	Agüero (yellow card) 42'; Nasri (yellow card) 70'; Milner (yellow card) 75'; Negredo 80'	Report	Ribéry 6'; Kroos (yellow card) 45'; Müller 50'; Robben 59'; Boateng (red card) 86'	Stadium: City of Manchester Stadium; Attendance: 45,021; Referee: Björn Kuipers (Netherlands); Man of the Match: Arjen Robben

23 October 2013 3	CSKA Moscow (Russia)	1–2	(England) Manchester City	Moscow, Russia
18:00 CEST (UTC+02:00)	Tošić 32'; Wernbloom (yellow card) 45+1'; Ignashevich (yellow card) 53'; Musa (yellow card) 71'	Report	Agüero 34', 42'; Negredo (yellow card) 47'; Touré (yellow card) 64'; Zabaleta (yellow card) 79'	Stadium: Luzhniki Stadium; Attendance: 14,000; Referee: Ovidiu Hațegan (Romania); Man of the Match: Sergio Agüero

5 November 2013 4	Manchester City (England)	5–2	(Russia) CSKA Moscow	Manchester, England
20:45 CET (UTC+01:00)	Agüero 3' (pen.), 20'; Negredo 30', 51', 90+2'; Touré (yellow card) 57'	Report	Tošić (yellow card) 12'; Doumbia 45', 71' (pen.)	Stadium: City of Manchester Stadium; Attendance: 35,000; Referee: Carlos Velasco Carballo (Spain); Man of the Match: Álvaro Negredo

27 November 2013 5	Manchester City (England)	4–2	(Czech Republic) Viktoria Plzeň	Manchester, England
20:45 CET (UTC+01:00)	Agüero 33' (pen.); Milner (yellow card) 40'; Nasri 65'; Demichelis (yellow card) 72'; Negredo 78'; Džeko 89'; Touré (yellow card) 90+2'	Report	Hořava 43'; Čišovský (yellow card) 49'; Tecl 69'	Stadium: City of Manchester Stadium; Attendance: 37,742; Referee: Fırat Aydınus (Turkey); Man of the Match: Samir Nasri

10 December 2013 6	Bayern Munich (Germany)	2–3	(England) Manchester City	Munich, Germany
20:45 CET (UTC+01:00)	Müller 5'; Götze 12'; Dante (yellow card) 40'	Report	Silva 28'; Džeko (yellow card) 42'; Milner (yellow card) 44', (goal) 62'; Kolarov 59' (pen.); Fernandinho (yellow card) 78'; Zabaleta (yellow card) 83'	Stadium: Allianz Arena; Attendance: 60,000; Referee: David Fernández Borbalán (Spain); Man of the Match: James Milner

==== Knockout phase ====
===== Round of 16 =====
18 February 2014 First leg	Manchester City (England)	0–2	(Spain) Barcelona	Manchester, England
20:45 CET (UTC+01:00)	Negredo (yellow card) 28'; Kolarov (yellow card) 37'; Demichelis (red card) 53'	Report	Alves (yellow card) 23', (goal) 90+1'; Messi 54' (pen.); Mascherano (yellow card) 76'	Stadium: Etihad Stadium; Attendance: 46,033; Referee: Jonas Eriksson (Sweden)

12 March 2014 Second leg	Barcelona (Spain)	2–1 (4–1 agg.)	(England) Manchester City	Barcelona, Spain
20:45 CET (UTC+01:00)	Fàbregas (yellow card) 54'; Messi 67'; Alves 90+1'	Report	Fernandinho (yellow card) 9'; Kolarov (yellow card) 23'; Zabaleta (yellow card) 30' (yellow-red card) 78'; Kompany (yellow card) 73', (goal) 89'	Stadium: Camp Nou; Attendance: 85,957; Referee: Stéphane Lannoy (France)

== Squad information ==
=== First team squad ===
N	Pos.	Nat.	Name	Age	EU	Since	App	Goals	Ends	Transfer fee	Notes
1	GK	(England)	Joe Hart	27	EU	2006	256	0	2016	£500k	
2	RB	(England)	Micah Richards	26	EU	2005	244	10	2015	Youth system	
4	CB	(Belgium)	Vincent Kompany	28	EU	2008	243	12	2018	£6m	Captain
5	RB	(Argentina)	Pablo Zabaleta	29	Non-EU	2008	243	8	2017	£6m	
6	CB	(England)	Joleon Lescott	31	EU	2009	160	9	2014	£22m	
7	AM	(England)	James Milner	28	EU	2010	158	10	2015	£24m	
8	AM	(France)	Samir Nasri	27	EU	2011	128	22	2015	£25m	
9	FW	(Spain)	Álvaro Negredo	28	EU	2013	49	23	2017	£20m	
10	FW	(Bosnia and Herzegovina)	Edin Džeko	28	Non-EU	2011 (Winter)	157	66	2015	£27m	
11	LW	(England)	Scott Sinclair	25	EU	2012	15	0	2016	£6.2m	
13	LB	(Serbia)	Aleksandar Kolarov	28	Non-EU	2010	138	15	2015	£16m	
14	CM	(Spain)	Javi García	27	EU	2012	74	2	2017	£16m	
15	RW	(Spain)	Jesús Navas	28	EU	2013	48	6	2017	£14.9m	
16	FW	(Argentina)	Sergio Agüero	26	Non-EU	2011	122	75	2017	£35m	
17	CM	(England)	Jack Rodwell	23	EU	2012	25	2	2017	£12m	
18	CM	(England)	Gareth Barry	33	EU	2009	175	8	2014	£12m	On loan at Everton
21	AM	(Spain)	David Silva	28	EU	2010	182	26	2017	£24m	
22	LB	(France)	Gaël Clichy	28	EU	2011	105	1	2017	£7m	
25	CM	(Brazil)	Fernandinho	29	Non-EU	2013	46	5	2018	£30m	
26	CB	(Argentina)	Martín Demichelis	33	Non-EU	2013	35	2	2015	£4m	
29	GK	(England)	Richard Wright	36	EU	2012	0	0	2014	Free	
30	GK	(Romania)	Costel Pantilimon	27	EU	2011	29	0	2016	£1m	
33	CB	(Serbia)	Matija Nastasić	21	Non-EU	2012	50	0	2017	£10m	
35	FW	(Montenegro)	Stevan Jovetić	24	Non-EU	2013	18	6	2017	£22m	
38	DF	(Belgium)	Dedryck Boyata	24	EU	2006	30	1	N/A	Youth system	
42	CM	(Ivory Coast)	Yaya Touré	31	Non-EU	2010	183	55	2017	£24m	
52	MF	(Wales)	Emyr Huws	20	EU	2012	1	0	N/A	Youth system	On loan at Birmingham City
60	FW	(Sweden)	John Guidetti	22	EU	2008	1	0	2015	£100k	On loan at Celtic
64	FW	(Portugal)	Marcos Lopes	18	EU	2011	5	1	N/A	Youth system	

Updated to match played 11 May 2014
Source: mcfc.co.uk
Ordered by squad number.
Appearances include all competitive league and cup appearances, including as substitute.

=== Playing statistics ===
As of 11 May 2014

Appearances (Apps) numbers are for appearances in competitive games only, including sub appearances.
Red card numbers denote: numbers in parentheses represent red cards overturned for wrongful dismissal.

No.	Nat.	Player	Pos.	Premier League				FA Cup				League Cup				Champions League				Total			
No.	Nat.	Player	Pos.	Apps	Goal	Yellow card	Red card	Apps	Goal	Yellow card	Red card	Apps	Goal	Yellow card	Red card	Apps	Goal	Yellow card	Red card	Apps	Goal	Yellow card	Red card
1	(England)	Joe Hart	GK	31		1						1				7				39		1	
2	(England)	Micah Richards	DF	2				3				2				3				10			
4	(Belgium)	Vincent Kompany	DF	28	4	6	1	2		1		3				4	1	1		37	5	8	1
5	(Argentina)	Pablo Zabaleta	DF	35	1	11		3				4				6		4	1	48	1	15	1
6	(England)	Joleon Lescott	DF	10				5				5				4				24			
7	(England)	James Milner	MF	31	1	3		4		2		3				6	1	3		44	2	8	
8	(France)	Samir Nasri	MF	34	7	3		2	2	1		3	1			7	1	1		46	11	5	
9	(Spain)	Álvaro Negredo	FW	32	9	1		4	3			5	6	1		8	5	2		49	23	4	
10	(Bosnia and Herzegovina)	Edin Džeko	FW	31	16	4		5	2	2		5	6			7	2	1		48	26	7	
13	(Serbia)	Aleksandar Kolarov	DF	29	1	2		2	1	1		5	1			7	1	3		43	4	6	
14	(Spain)	Javi García	MF	29		7		4				6		1		4				43		8	
15	(Spain)	Jesús Navas	MF	30	4			5				5	2	1		8				48	6	1	
16	(Argentina)	Sergio Agüero	FW	23	17	4		3	4			2	1	1		6	6	1		34	28	6	
17	(England)	Jack Rodwell	MF	5				1				3				1				10			
21	(Spain)	David Silva	MF	27	7	5		3				4		1		6	1			40	8	6	
22	(France)	Gaël Clichy	DF	20		1		4				3		1		4				31		2	
25	(Brazil)	Fernandinho	MF	33	5	8		2				3				8		3		46	5	11	
26	(Argentina)	Martín Demichelis	DF	27	2	6		2				2				4		1	1	35	2	7	1
29	(England)	Richard Wright	GK																				
30	(Romania)	Costel Pantilimon	GK	7		1		5				5				1				18		1	
33	(Serbia)	Matija Nastasić	DF	13		4		2		1		1				4				20		5	
35	(Montenegro)	Stevan Jovetić	FW	13	3	1		2	1	1		3	2							18	6	2	
38	(Belgium)	Dedryck Boyata	DF	1				1			1	4		1						6		1	1
42	(Ivory Coast)	Yaya Touré	MF	35	20	4		4		2		3	3			7	1	3		49	24	9	
52	(Wales)	Emyr Huws	MF					1												1			
64	(Portugal)	Marcos Lopes	MF					1				3								4			
Own goals					5				0				0				0				5		
Totals					102	72	1		13	11	1		22	7	0		19	23	2		156	113	4

Source: (for players and positions) Season 2013–14 First Team Squad (for squad numbers) Squad Profiles (for actual stats.)

=== Goalscorers ===
Includes all competitive matches. The list is sorted alphabetically by surname when total goals are equal.

Correct as of game played on 11 May 2014

No.	Nat.	Player	Pos.	Premier League	FA Cup	League Cup	Champions League	TOTAL
16	(Argentina)	Sergio Agüero	FW	17	4	1	6	28
10	(Bosnia and Herzegovina)	Edin Džeko	FW	16	2	6	2	26
42	(Ivory Coast)	Yaya Touré	MF	20	0	3	1	24
9	(Spain)	Álvaro Negredo	FW	9	3	6	5	23
8	(France)	Samir Nasri	MF	7	2	1	1	11
21	(Spain)	David Silva	MF	7	0	0	1	8
15	(Spain)	Jesús Navas	MF	4	0	2	0	6
35	(Montenegro)	Stevan Jovetić	FW	3	1	2	0	6
25	(Brazil)	Fernandinho	MF	5	0	0	0	5
4	(Belgium)	Vincent Kompany	DF	4	0	0	1	5
13	(Serbia)	Aleksandar Kolarov	DF	1	1	1	1	4
26	(Argentina)	Martín Demichelis	DF	2	0	0	0	2
7	(England)	James Milner	MF	1	0	0	1	2
5	(Argentina)	Pablo Zabaleta	DF	1	0	0	0	1
Own Goals				5	0	0	0	5
Totals				102	13	22	19	156

== Awards ==
=== PFA Team of the Year ===
The combined best 11 from all teams in the Premier League chosen by the PFA.

Player	Position
(Belgium) Vincent Kompany	Defence
(Ivory Coast) Yaya Touré	Midfield

=== Premier League Manager of the Month award ===
Awarded monthly to the manager who was chosen by a panel assembled by the Premier League's sponsor.

Month	Manager
December	(Chile) Manuel Pellegrini
January	(Chile) Manuel Pellegrini

=== Premier League Player of the Month award ===
Awarded monthly to the player chosen by a panel assembled by the Premier League's sponsor.

Month	Player
October	(Argentina) Sergio Agüero

=== Etihad Player of the Month awards ===
Awarded to the player that receives the most votes in a poll conducted each month on the official website of Manchester City.

Month	Player
August	(Spain) Álvaro Negredo
September	(Ivory Coast) Yaya Touré
October	(Argentina) Sergio Agüero
November	(France) Samir Nasri
December	(Brazil) Fernandinho
January	(Bosnia and Herzegovina) Edin Džeko
February	(Ivory Coast) Yaya Touré
March	(Spain) David Silva
April	(Argentina) Martín Demichelis

=== BBC African Footballer of the Year award ===
Awarded annually to the player chosen by public vote from a shortlist compiled by experts.

Month	Player
2013	(Ivory Coast) Yaya Touré

=== CAF African Player of the Year award ===
Awarded every calendar year from a shortlist of three based on a vote of the 54 CAF national team managers.

Year	Player
2013	(Ivory Coast) Yaya Touré

== Transfers and loans ==
=== Transfers in ===
First Team
Date	Position	No.	Player	From club	Transfer fee
6 June 2013	MF	25	(Brazil) Fernandinho	(Ukraine) Shakhtar Donetsk	£30,000,000
11 June 2013	MF	15	(Spain) Jesús Navas	(Spain) Sevilla	£14,900,000
19 July 2013	FW	9	(Spain) Álvaro Negredo	(Spain) Sevilla	£20,000,000
19 July 2013	FW	35	(Montenegro) Stevan Jovetić	(Italy) Fiorentina	£22,000,000
1 September 2013	DF	26	(Argentina) Martín Demichelis	(Spain) Atlético Madrid	£4,000,000

Reserves and Academy
Date	Position	No.	Player	From club	Transfer fee
1 June 2013	FW	No.	(France) Thierry Ambrose	(France) Auxerre	Undisc.
6 June 2013	FW	No.	(Sweden) Zackarias Faour	(Sweden) Malmö FF	£490,000

=== Transfers out ===
First Team
Exit date	Position	No.	Player	To club	Transfer fee
1 July 2013	DF	28	(Ivory Coast) Kolo Touré	(England) Liverpool	Released
1 July 2013	DF	19	(England) Wayne Bridge	(England) Reading	Released
1 July 2013	FW	24	(Paraguay) Roque Santa Cruz	(Spain) Málaga	Released
27 June 2013	FW	32	(Argentina) Carlos Tevez	(Italy) Juventus	£12,000,000
16 July 2013	DF	3	(Brazil) Maicon	(Italy) Roma	£3,000,000
17 October 2013	MF	62	(Ivory Coast) Abdul Razak	(Russia) Anzhi Makhachkala	Undisc.

Reserves and Academy
Exit date	Position	No.	Player	To club	Transfer fee
1 July 2013	DF	48	(Northern Ireland) Ryan McGivern	(Scotland) Hibernian	Free
1 July 2013	MF	59	(Norway) Omar Elabdellaoui	(Germany) Eintracht Braunschweig	Free
1 July 2013	MF	90	(Italy) Filippo Mancini	Unattached	Released
12 July 2013	DF	61	(France) Jérémy Hélan	(England) Sheffield Wednesday	£350,000
22 August 2013	MF	--	(Spain) Denis Suárez	(Spain) Barcelona B	£1,350,000
29 August 2013	MF	--	(Romania) Vlad Marin	(Italy) Juventus	Free
20 January 2014	FW	47	(England) Harry Bunn	(England) Huddersfield Town	Free
22 January 2014	MF	--	(Norway) Abdisalam Ibrahim	(Greece) Olympiacos	Free
21 February 2014	MF	--	(Ghana) Mohammed Abu	(Norway) Strømsgodset	Free
15 April 2014	DF	--	(England) Reece Wabara	(England) Doncaster Rovers	Released

=== Loans out ===
First Team
Start date	End date	Position	No.	Player	To club
22 August 2013	31 May 2014	MF	11	(England) Scott Sinclair	(England) West Bromwich Albion
2 September 2013	17 October 2013	MF	62	(Ivory Coast) Abdul Razak	(Russia) Anzhi Makhachkala
23 September 2013	31 May 2014	MF	18	(England) Gareth Barry	(England) Everton
14 January 2014	31 May 2014	FW	60	(Sweden) John Guidetti	(England) Stoke City

Reserves and Academy
Start date	End date	Position	No.	Player	To club
10 July 2013	31 May 2014	DF	44	(Netherlands) Karim Rekik	(Netherlands) PSV
4 August 2013	31 May 2014	FW	49	(Italy) Luca Scapuzzi	(Italy) Siena
6 August 2013	31 December 2013	DF	57	(England) Reece Wabara	(England) Doncaster Rovers
30 August 2013	17 September 2013	MF	55	(Slovakia) Albert Rusnák	(England) Oldham Athletic
2 September 2013	30 September 2013	FW	47	(England) Harry Bunn	(England) Sheffield United
2 September 2013	31 March 2014	MF	31	(Ghana) Mohammed Abu	(Denmark) AGF
18 September 2013	2 January 2014	DF	58	(England) George Swan	(England) Sheffield Wednesday
17 October 2013	16 November 2014	MF	53	(England) Alex Henshall	(England) Bristol Rovers
30 October 2013	3 February 2014	MF	70	(England) George Evans	(England) Crewe Alexandra
28 November 2013	4 January 2014	DF	78	(England) Ellis Plummer	(England) Oldham Athletic
28 November 2013	6 January 2014	FW	47	(England) Harry Bunn	(England) Huddersfield Town
12 January 2014	22 February 2014	MF	55	(Slovakia) Albert Rusnák	(England) Birmingham City
28 January 2014	1 March 2014	MF	52	(Wales) Emyr Huws	(England) Birmingham City
