= Macazaga =

Macazaga is a Basque language surname. Notable people with the surname include:

- Lucas Macazaga (born 2006), Spanish-Bolivian footballer
- Xabier Mancisidor (born 1970, full name Xabier Macisidor Macazaga, Spanish footballer and coach
- Francisco Javier Macazaga Azurmendi, assassin of Spanish politician Manuel Indiano Azaustre in 2000
