= Samir Nasri =

French footballer (born 1987)

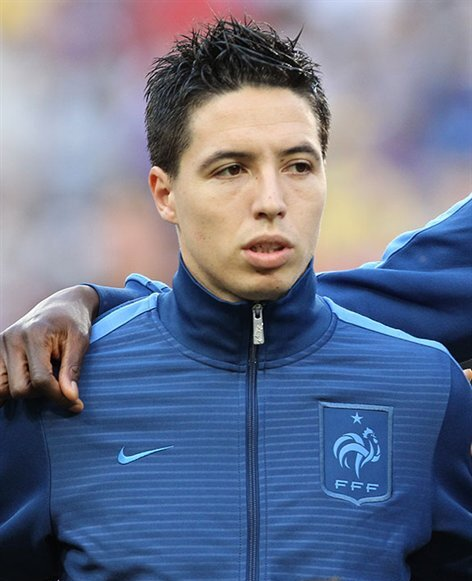
- Nasri with France in 2012

Personal information
- Date of birth: 26 June 1987 (age 39)
- Place of birth: Septèmes-les-Vallons, France
- Height: 1.75 m (5 ft 9 in)
- Position: Attacking midfielder

Youth career
- 1995–1997: Pennes Mirabeau
- 1997–2004: Marseille

Senior career*
Years	Team	Apps	(Gls)
2004–2008	Marseille	121	(11)
2008–2011	Arsenal	86	(18)
2011–2017	Manchester City	129	(18)
2016–2017	→ Sevilla (loan)	23	(2)
2017–2018	Antalyaspor	8	(2)
2019	West Ham United	5	(0)
2019–2020	Anderlecht	7	(1)
Total		379	(52)

International career
2002–2003	France U16	16	(8)
2003–2004	France U17	16	(6)
2004–2005	France U18	4	(0)
2005–2006	France U19	10	(5)
2006–2007	France U21	4	(0)
2007–2013	France	41	(5)
Medal record
Men's football
Representing France
UEFA European Under-17 Championship
Winner	2004
- * Club domestic league appearances and goals

Samir Nasri (Arabic: سمير نصري; born 26 June 1987) is a French former professional footballer. He primarily played as an attacking midfielder and a winger, although he was also deployed in the central midfield. Nasri was known for his dribbling, ball control and passing ability. His playing style, ability and cultural background drew comparisons to former French player Zinedine Zidane.

Nasri began his football career playing for local youth clubs in his hometown Marseille. At age nine, he joined professional club Olympique de Marseille and spent the next seven years developing in the club's youth academy at La Commanderie, the club's training centre. In the 2004–05 season, he made his professional debut in September 2004 at age 17 against Sochaux. In the following season, he became a regular starter in the team and participated in European competition for the first time after playing in the 2005–06 edition of the UEFA Cup. In the 2006–07 campaign, Nasri won the National Union of Professional Footballers (UNFP) Young Player of the Year award and was also named to the Team of the Year. He finished his career with Marseille amassing over 160 appearances. He played in the teams that reached back-to-back Coupe de France finals in 2006 and 2007.

In June 2008, Nasri joined Premier League club Arsenal on a four-year contract. He reached prominence with the team in his third season winning the Professional Footballers' Association (PFA) Fans' Player of the Month award on three occasions and being named to the association's Team of the Year. In December 2010, he was named the French Player of the Year for his performances during the calendar year. In August 2011, after three seasons with Arsenal, Nasri joined Manchester City on a four-year contract. In his first season with the club, he won his first major honour as a player as the club won the 2011–12 Premier League. He totalled 176 games and 27 goals for the club, winning another Premier League title and the Football League Cup in 2014. Following a loan to Sevilla in 2016, he had short spells at Antalyaspor, West Ham United and Anderlecht until his retirement in 2021. He was suspended from football for eighteen months until January 2019 following a doping violation.

Nasri was a France youth international and represented his nation at every level for which he was eligible. Prior to playing for the senior team, he played on the under-17 team that won the 2004 UEFA European Under-17 Championship. Nasri made his senior international debut in March 2007 in a friendly match against Austria and scored his first senior international goal in a 1–0 UEFA Euro 2008 qualifying win over Georgia two months later. He made 41 appearances for France, scoring five goals, and represented the country at UEFA Euro 2008 and Euro 2012. He retired from international football after being omitted from the French squad for the 2014 World Cup.

== Early life ==
Nasri was born in Septèmes-les-Vallons, a northern suburb of Marseille, to French nationals of Algerian descent. His mother, Ouassila Ben Saïd, and father, Abdelhafid Nasri, were both born in France; his father being born and raised in Marseille, and his mother being from the nearby Salon-de-Provence. Nasri's grandparents emigrated to France from Algeria. His mother is a housewife and his father previously worked as a bus driver before becoming his son's personal manager. At the start of his football career, Nasri initially played under his mother's surname, Ben Saïd, before switching to Nasri, his father's surname, following his selection to the France under-16 team. He is the eldest of four siblings and describes himself as a non-practicing Muslim. Nasri has a younger sister named Sonia and twin brothers named Walid and Malik. All four were raised in La Gavotte Peyret. After joining Arsenal in England, Nasri settled in Hampstead, a district of North London. His cousin, Kaïs Nasri, is also a professional footballer.

== Club career ==
=== Early career ===
While growing up in La Gavotte Peyret, Nasri regularly played the sport on the streets where he learned many of his skills. Upon noticing his prodigious talent, his parents signed him up to play with the local club in his hometown. Nasri spent one year playing with the club in La Gavotte Peyret before moving to Pennes Mirabeau in nearby Mirabeau at age seven. While playing with Pennes, Nasri was discovered by Marseille scout Freddy Assolen, who had been informed of the player's talent through local word of mouth. After noticing Nasri's skill in person, Assolen recruited the player to travel with a group of other young players to Italy to participate in a youth tournament where they would play against the youth academies of Milan and Juventus. Nasri impressed at the tournament and Assolen was jokingly told by a Milan scout that "he [Nasri] stays here, you leave him". After returning to France, Marseille officials organized a meeting with the player's father and the group agreed to allow Nasri insertion into the club's academy at the age of nine.

=== Olympique de Marseille ===
"He could do everything with the ball: stepovers, dribbling, shooting with the right or the left. In fact, I wasn't even sure whether he was left or right-footed."

— Freddy Assolen, upon noticing Nasri's skill at the age of nine.

Upon entering the Marseille youth academy, Nasri quickly impressed. Upon moving to Bastide, where the club's youth players reside, his style of play began to take shape. In 2007, Nasri admitted that the move to Bastide really helped his game, stating, "That's where I really started to progress. Training was different and the facilities are beautiful, all of which helps you work well." As a result of his quick progression, Nasri was an integral part of every youth team he was a part of winning several trophies, such as the Championnat de Provence, Coupe de Provence, and the Ligue de la Méditerranée. After spending most of the 2003–04 season playing with the club's under-18 team, for the latter part of the season, the now 16-year-old Nasri was promoted to the club's reserve team in the Championnat de France amateur, the fourth division of French football. He appeared primarily as a substitute in a few matches during the campaign as the reserve team failed to rebound from its bad start to the season, which resulted in a 16th-place finish and relegation to the Championnat de France amateur 2.

==== Debut season ====
Ahead of the 2004–05 season, several clubs were reported to be interested in signing Nasri, most notably English clubs Arsenal, Chelsea, Liverpool and Newcastle United. In an effort to decrease the speculation, Nasri was offered a three-year professional contract by Marseille officials led by president Pape Diouf and manager José Anigo. On 13 August 2004, Nasri agreed to the contract. Marseille officials had been eager to sign Nasri to a contract in an attempt to not undergo a situation similar to the departure of Mathieu Flamini, in which the player departed the club without Marseille receiving any compensation. As a result of his professional contract, Nasri was promoted to the senior team by Anigo and assigned the number 22 shirt. He began the season playing on the club's reserve team and appeared in four matches before earning a call up to the senior team in September 2004.

Nasri made his professional debut on 12 September in a 2–0 league defeat to Sochaux, appearing as a substitute for Bruno Cheyrou. On 17 October, he made his first professional start playing the entire match in a 1–1 draw with Saint-Étienne. Nasri featured heavily within the team under Anigo and later Philippe Troussier. In the team's first match following the winter break, he scored his first professional goal in a 2–1 away victory over Lille. Nasri finished his rookie campaign with 25 total appearances, one goal and two assists.

==== 2005–06 season ====
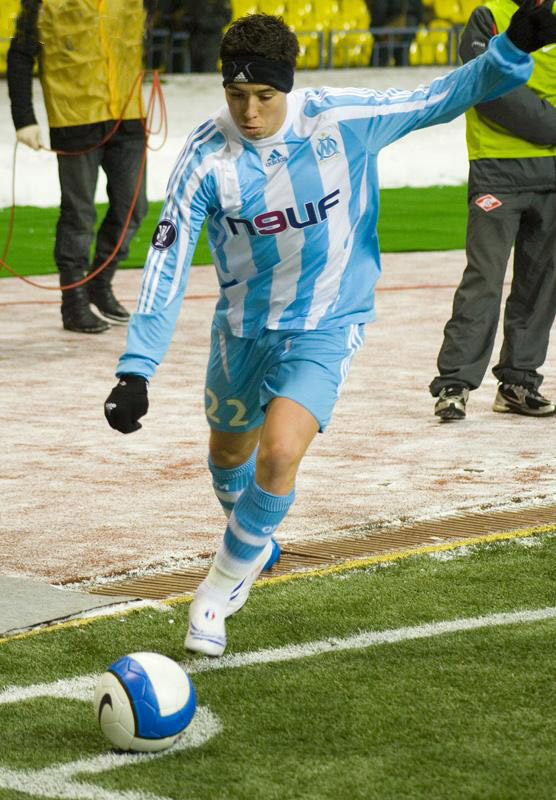
Nasri taking a corner during his time with Marseille

The 2005–06 season saw Marseille boosted by the arrival of attackers Franck Ribéry and Djibril Cissé, the latter arriving after having a successful loan stint with the club the previous season. Nasri, who was now given a more prominent role within the team by new manager Jean Fernandez, formed impressive partnerships with the two along with lead striker Mamadou Niang. He appeared in 49 total matches, which included appearances in both the UEFA Cup and the UEFA Intertoto Cup. Nasri made his European debut on 16 July 2005 in the first round of the 2005 UEFA Intertoto Cup against Swiss club Young Boys. Marseille won the first leg 3–2. In the second leg, Nasri scored his first European goal in a 2–1 win. Marseille ultimately won the competition after beating Spanish outfit Deportivo de La Coruña 5–3 on aggregate. In the league, Nasri appeared in 30 matches, 25 as a starter. He scored his only league goal of the season on 29 April 2007 in a 4–2 win over Sochaux. In the Coupe de France, Nasri appeared in five matches as Marseille reached the final of the competition where the club faced Le Classique rivals Paris Saint-Germain. Nasri appeared as a substitute in the match as Marseille were defeated 2–1. Following the season, Nasri signed a two-year contract extension with the club until 2009.

==== 2006–07 season ====
Nasri began the 2006–07 season playing under Albert Emon, his fourth different manager in three years. Despite this, Marseille's now heightened popularity saw increased speculation from writers and supporters that the club would finally win its first league title since the 1991–92 season. Nasri began the season on a quick note scoring the second goal in the team's 3–1 win over Paris Saint-Germain in September 2006. On 29 April 2007, Nasri scored a goal in Marseille's 4–2 hammering of Sochaux. Marseille were due to face the same club in the 2007 Coupe de France Final just days later and were, subsequently, heavy favorites as a result of the team's two-goal victory in the previous match. However, Sochaux recorded an upset victory defeating Marseille 5–4 on penalties after the match ended 2–2 following extra time. On the final match day of the season, Nasri converted the only goal in a 1–0 win over Sedan. The victory secured 2nd place for Marseille and was the club's best finish since finishing runner-up to Bordeaux in the 1998–99 season. Nasri finished the season with a career-high 50 appearances, 37 of them in the league. For his efforts, he was awarded the UNFP Young Player of the Year award and named to the Team of the Year. Nasri was also voted the Club Player of the Year by supporters, receiving 62% of the votes ahead of the likes of Ribéry and Niang.

==== 2007–08 season ====
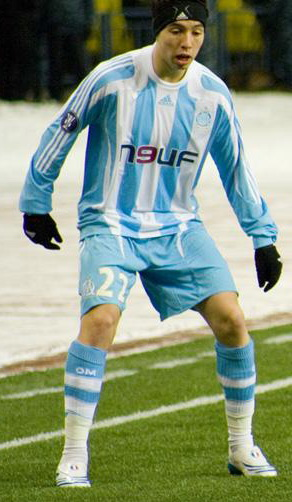
Nasri with Marseille in 2008

Similar to his previous three years at Marseille, Nasri began the new season under new management as the club was now being led by the Belgian Eric Gerets. Due to the departure of Ribéry to Bayern Munich, Gerets installed Nasri as the focal point of the attack and he responding by having his best season at the club. He appeared in 42 total matches scoring a career-high six goals, also assisting on a career-high 15 goals. Nasri formed partnerships in the midfield with winger Mathieu Valbuena and midfielders Lorik Cana and Benoît Cheyrou as Marseille boasted the third-best attack in the league behind champions Lyon and Bordeaux, who finished first and second in the league respectively. Initially, Nasri struggled during the infancy of the campaign due to dealing with the effects of a severely sprained ankle suffered in the pre-season. He failed to score a goal or provide an assist in the team's first eight league matches. On 24 November 2007, he assisted on two goals in a 2–0 victory over Metz. Nasri closed out the fall season by assisting on the equalizing goal in a 2–2 draw with Bordeaux and making the final pass on the match-winning goal against Le Mans.

Following the winter break, Nasri's goal-scoring began to take form. In late January, he scored goals in back-to-back matches against Nancy and Caen. In European competition, Nasri participated in the UEFA Champions League for the first time in his career, however he failed to make an impact in the four group stage matches he appeared in. He missed the club's upset victory over Liverpool at Anfield due to dealing with a bout of meningitis. Marseille ultimately finished the group in third place, which resulted in the team qualifying for the round of 32 of the UEFA Cup. The club was defeated in the round of 16 by Zenit Saint Petersburg despite being up 3–1 heading into the second leg. Of those three goals Marseille scored in the first leg, Nasri assisted on two of them. On 16 March 2008, Nasri scored a goal in a 3–3 draw with Lens. A month later, he scored the game-winning goal in a 2–1 victory over Metz. In his final match with Marseille, against Strasbourg, Nasri scored a goal and assisted on another in a 4–3 victory. Marseille finished the league campaign in third place, which resulted in the club qualifying for the UEFA Champions League for the second consecutive season. On 8 May 2008, with all the transfer speculation surrounding the player, Nasri surprised many by signing a three-year contract extension with the club until 2012.

=== Arsenal ===
==== 2008–09 season ====
"Samir is a student of football – he lives for the game. He loves training and watches game after game on TV. He uses things he has seen to help correct mistakes in his own game. When you genuinely love football this is what makes the difference."

— Arsenal scout Gilles Grimandi on Nasri.

One week later, despite signing a contract extension with Marseille, Nasri was linked with a move to Premier League club Arsenal. Arsenal manager Arsène Wenger had been tracking Nasri since watching him play at the 2004 UEFA European Under-17 Championship. It was later revealed that the contract extension Nasri signed with Marseille was simply protocol to allow Marseille to receive a higher transfer fee for the player. The Bouches-du-Rhône-based club was seeking £14 million for the young midfielder. Ahead of UEFA Euro 2008, both Nasri's agent and Wenger admitted that offers were made for the player and that a move to the English club was imminent. The deal was ultimately concluded following the competition on 11 July 2008 with Nasri agreeing to a four-year contract. The transfer fee was undisclosed, but has been purported to be in the region of £12 million. Upon arriving at the club, Nasri admitted Wenger was one of the primary reasons for him joining the club: "The fact that Arsène Wenger gives great opportunities to young players is very important for me. Arsène has a great reputation and he is one of the best managers in the world."

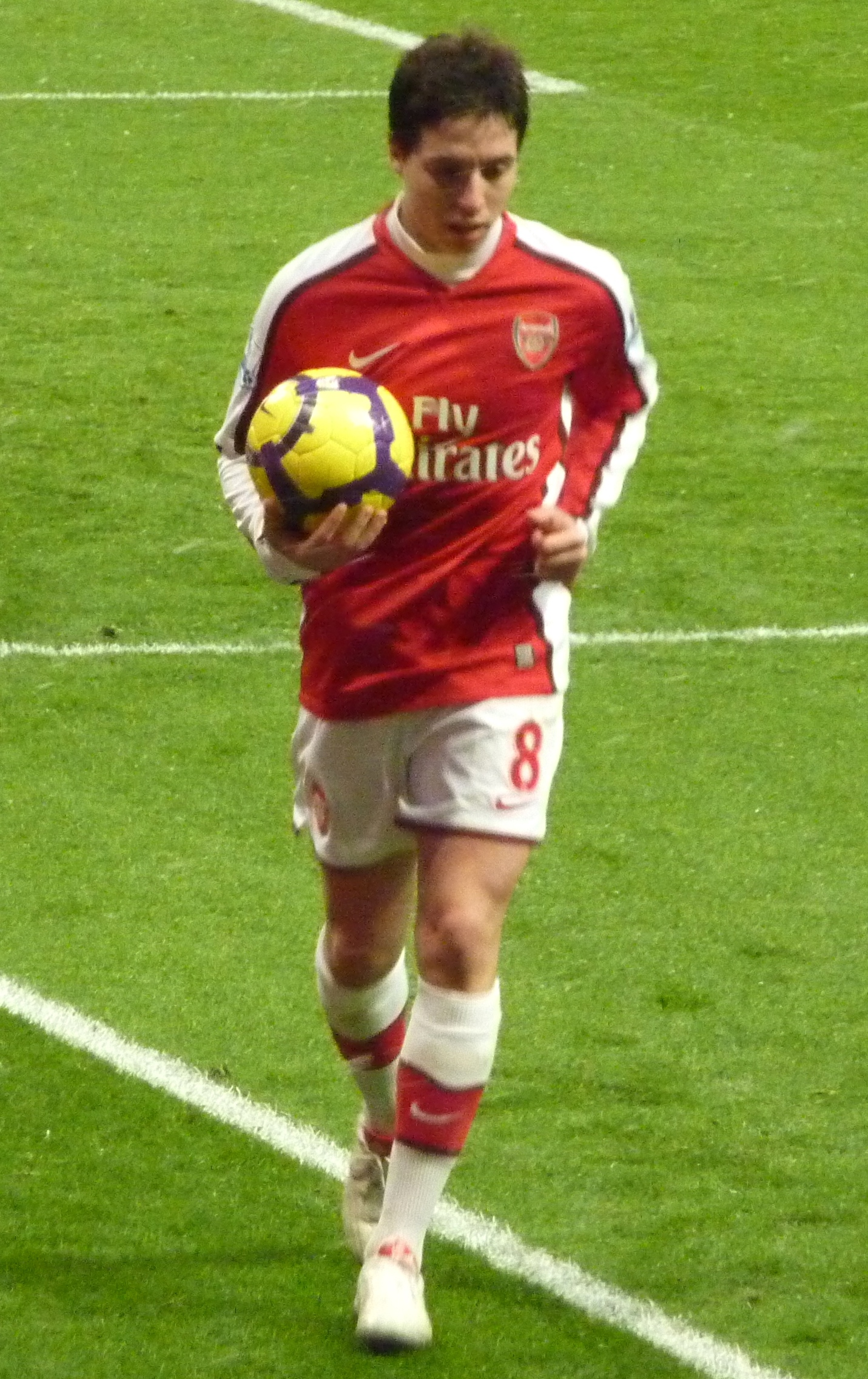
Nasri preparing to take a corner kick for Arsenal

Nasri was given the number 8 shirt – previously worn by Arsenal legends Ian Wright, George Graham, Alan Sunderland and Freddie Ljungberg – and made his club debut on 30 July 2008 in a friendly match against German club VfB Stuttgart in a 3–1 win. He made his Premier League debut in the team's first match of the league season on 16 August against West Bromwich Albion. In the match, Nasri scored his first league goal scoring with a close-range effort, after four minutes in a 1–0 victory. As a result of his debut goal, he became the 83rd player in Premier League history to score on his league debut and the 22nd Arsenal player. On 27 August, Nasri scored his second goal for the club in the team's 2008–09 UEFA Champions League third round qualifying second leg tie against Twente. Arsenal won the match 4–0 and the tie 6–0 on aggregate. On 8 November, Nasri scored both of Arsenal's goals in a 2–1 win over Manchester United.

On 21 December, Nasri assisted on the opening goal scored by Robin van Persie in the team's 1–1 draw with Liverpool. Nasri returned to his scoring form in the new year. On 17 January 2009, he scored the second goal in the club's 3–1 win over Hull City at the KC Stadium. It took Nasri another two months to score another goal, which came in Arsenal's 3–1 away win against Newcastle United. He finished his first campaign at Arsenal appearing in 44 matches, scoring seven goals and providing five assists.

==== 2009–10 season ====
On 21 July 2009, while participating in a training match during pre-season with Arsenal in Bad Waltersdorf, Nasri suffered a broken leg. The injury required two to three months of rest and, as a result, Nasri missed the opening of the 2009–10 Premier League season. He made his debut late in the campaign on 25 October 2009 in a League Cup tie against Liverpool. Nasri played the entire match in a 2–1 win. On 4 November, he scored his first goal of the season in the team's 2009–10 UEFA Champions League group stage match against AZ. Three weeks later, Nasri converted another Champions League goal, this time against Standard Liège in a 2–0 win. He featured heavily with the team during the winter months and he ended the 2009 calendar year by scoring a goal and providing an assist 4–1 win over Portsmouth away at Fratton Park.

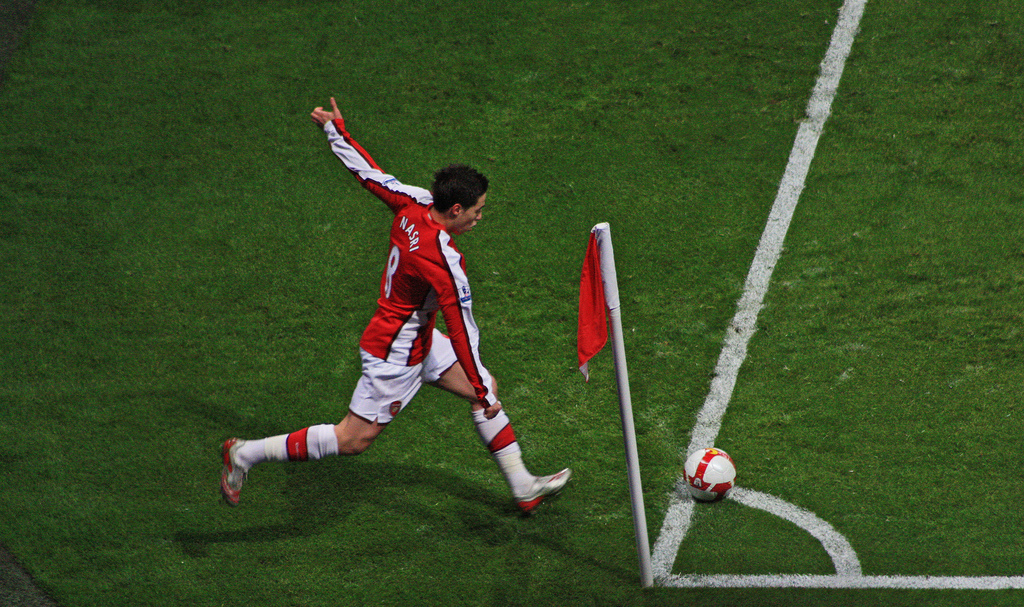
Nasri taking a corner kick for Arsenal

After going nearly two months without scoring a goal, Nasri marked his goal-scoring return in emphatic fashion in the team's 5–0 second leg victory over Porto in the round of 16 of the Champions League knockout stage. The goal, described by English newspaper The Guardian columnist David Lacey as "reminiscent of a lost art in British football", showcased Nasri's dribbling, as well as his individuality. Upon receiving the ball on the right wing from midfielder Abou Diaby, Nasri dribbled through and past three Porto players in a small area of space before bringing the ball past wing-back Álvaro Pereira and driving it across the goalkeeper, sending the ball in off the far post. Nasri goal was subsequently compared by the English media to similar goals that occurred in the country. Three weeks later, after appearing as a substitute in the second half, Nasri scored the opening goal against Birmingham City. Birmingham later equalized through a late goal from Kevin Phillips. The draw ended a string of seven consecutive league victories for Arsenal and Wenger admitted that the draw "was a big blow for our chances [of winning the league]". In the team's final seven league matches, Nasri assisted on goals in a 3–2 loss to Wigan Athletic and a 4–0 home win over Fulham. Arsenal ultimately finished the campaign in third place. Nasri concluded his second season at Arsenal appearing in 34 matches, scoring five goals and providing five assists.

==== 2010–11 season ====
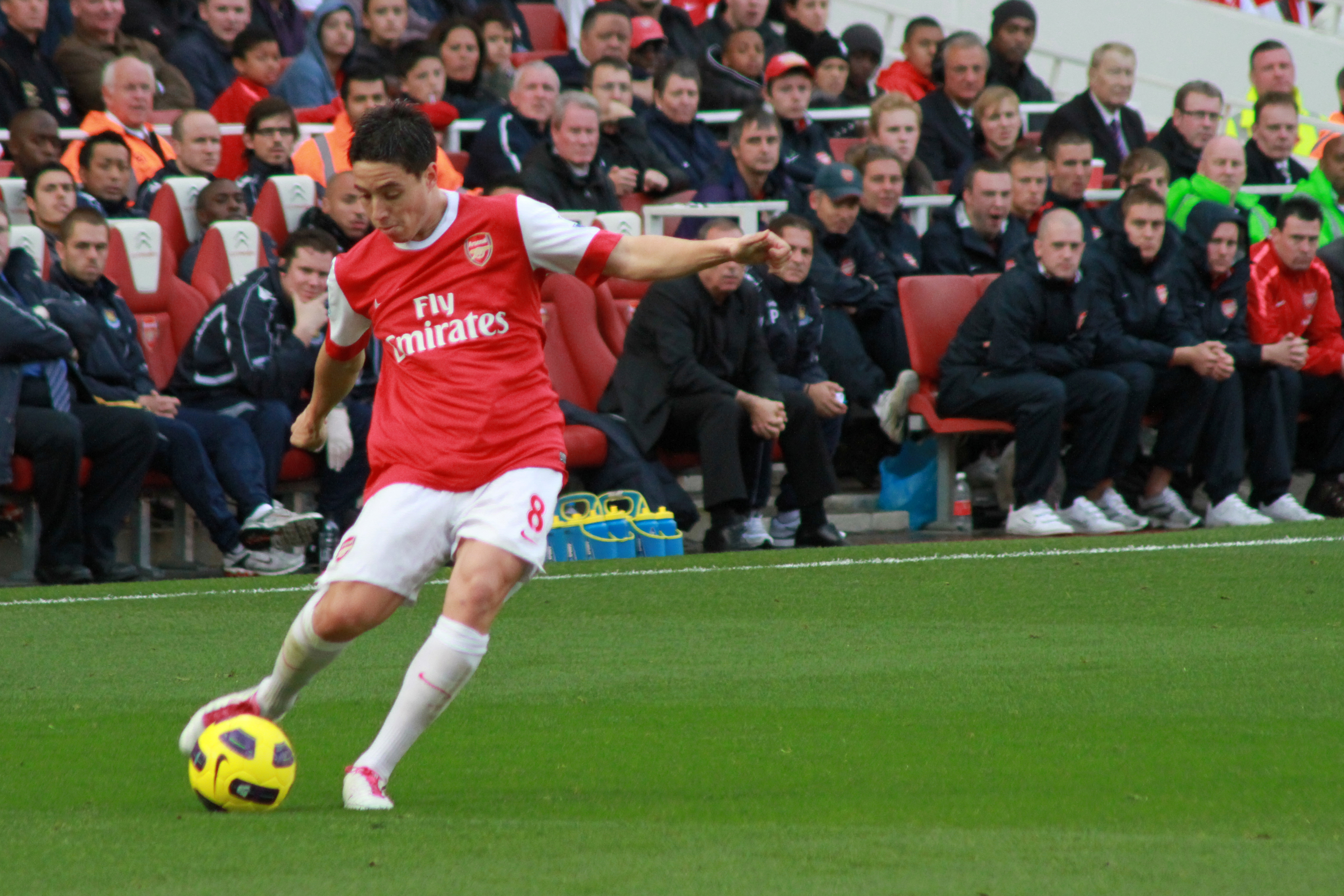
Nasri, in the 2010–11 season

Ahead of the 2010–11 season, Nasri admitted he was determined to re-capture his form that resulted in Arsenal signing him two years prior. He also admitted he did not take missing out on the 2010 FIFA World Cup well, stating, "When I discovered that I wasn't part of the squad for the World Cup, I got a big slap in the face." However, after speaking to Arsène Wenger, who informed him he should use the non-call-up as motivation, Nasri was reassured. Nasri started the campaign well. He was named in Arsenal's starting line-up to play against Liverpool for the first match of the season on 15 August 2010. Nasri played the entire match in a 1–1 draw. After the match, Arsenal confirmed Nasri had suffered a knee injury that would keep him out for a month. However, the player returned to the team after just three matches to help Arsenal defeat Braga 6–0 in the 2010–11 UEFA Champions League group stage on his return. On 21 September, he scored a double in the club's 4–1 extra time victory over North London derby rivals Tottenham Hotspur. Both goals were converted from the penalty spot. Fours days later, Nasri scored another double in a 3–2 home defeat to West Bromwich Albion.

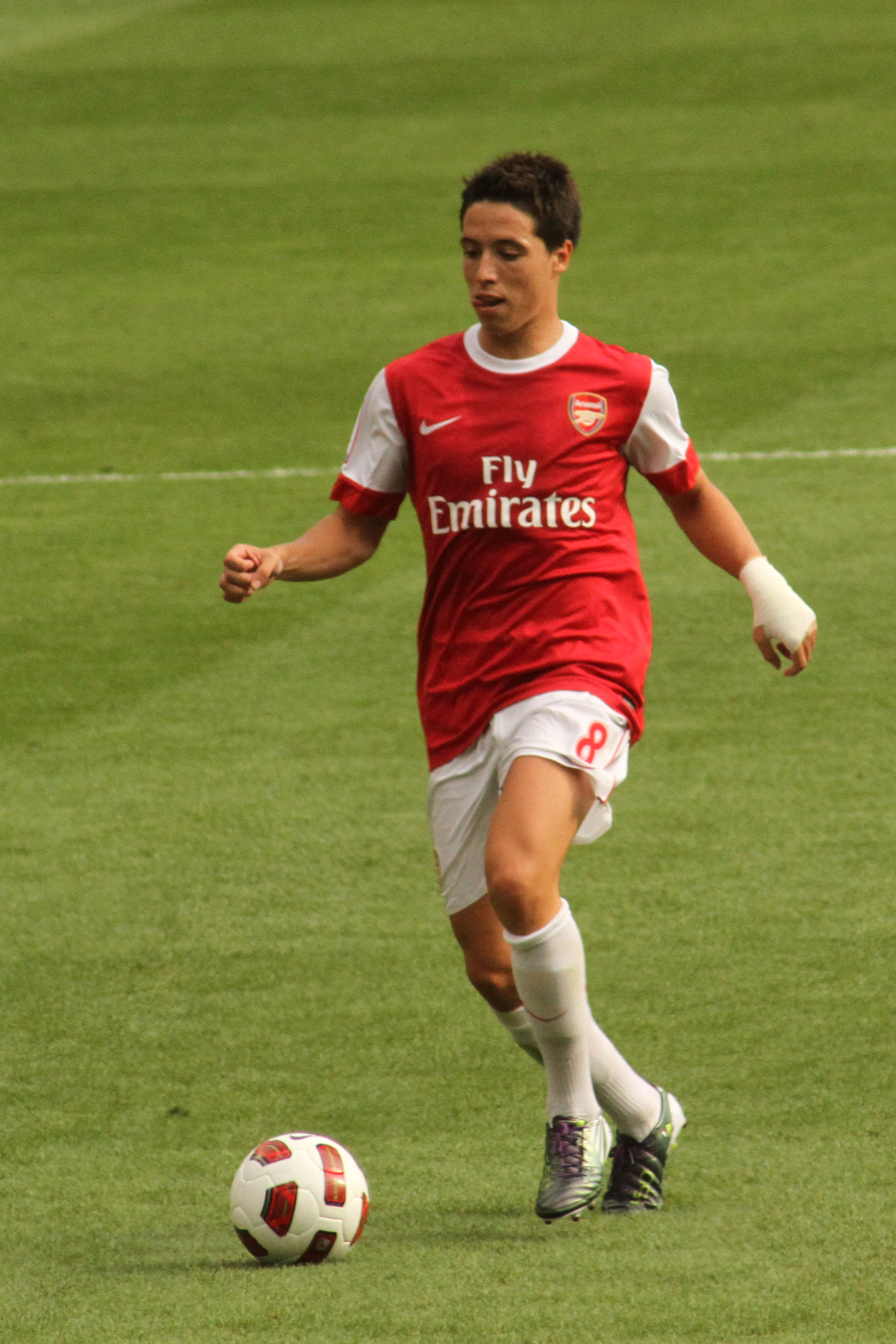
Nasri during the 2010–11 season

Nasri continued his fine form as season wore on. In the club's Champions League group stage tie against Serbian club Partizan, he assisted on a Sébastien Squillaci goal in the team's 3–1 victory. In October 2010, Nasri went on a streak in which he scored goals in three-straight matches. He started the streak by converting a penalty in a 2–1 win over Birmingham City. In the club's following match, against Shakhtar Donetsk, Nasri scored on a left-footed volley in a 5–1 victory. He also assisted on a goal in the match. Against Manchester City five days later, he scored the first goal and set up the third in a 3–0 victory. As a result of his performances in October 2010, Nasri was named the PFA Fans' Player of the Month. In November, Nasri was on the score-sheet again netting the opener in a 3–2 defeat to Tottenham. A week later, he scored a volley in a 4–2 win over Aston Villa.

On 4 December, Nasri scored two goals against Fulham to give Arsenal a 2–1 win. The victory placed Arsenal at the top of the league table. The two goals were Nasri's seventh and eighth goals, respectively, in the league and his tenth and 11th overall. Just four days later, Nasri scored a goal in Arsenal's vital last group match against Partizan, a 3–1 victory. On 13 December, for his performances during the 2010 calendar year, Nasri was named the France Football French Player of the Year, edging Chelsea midfielder Florent Malouda and Lyon goalkeeper Hugo Lloris. He became the first Arsenal player to achieve the honour since Thierry Henry in 2006. Nasri was also rewarded domestically for his performances in December, winning the Fans' Player of the Month for the second time in the season, also capturing the club's monthly award. He won the award for the second consecutive month in January.

Nasri scored his 13th goal of the season in the 3–0 win against Birmingham City on 1 January 2011. In the FA Cup, Nasri scored his first-ever goal in the competition in a 3–1 win over Leeds United in the third round. On 30 January, Nasri was forced to leave the team's fourth round FA Cup tie against Huddersfield Town due to a hamstring injury. He subsequently missed two weeks and returned to the team ahead of its Champions League knockout round tie with Spanish champions Barcelona. In the first leg, Nasri assisted the match-winning goal scored by Andrey Arshavin. Arsenal won the match 2–1, but lost the tie 4–3 on aggregate after suffering a 3–1 defeat at the Camp Nou in the second leg. On 8 April, Nasri was nominated for both the PFA Players' Player of the Year and PFA Young Player of the Year awards. He lost out on both awards to Tottenham midfielder Gareth Bale and teammate Jack Wilshere, respectively, but was given consolation with an appearance on the association's Team of the Year.

Of his time at Emirates Stadium, Nasri has expressed deep admiration for his former manager Wenger, of whom he also described as a "role model" and a "magician". Altogether, Nasri scored 27 goals in 124 total appearances for Arsenal.

=== Manchester City ===
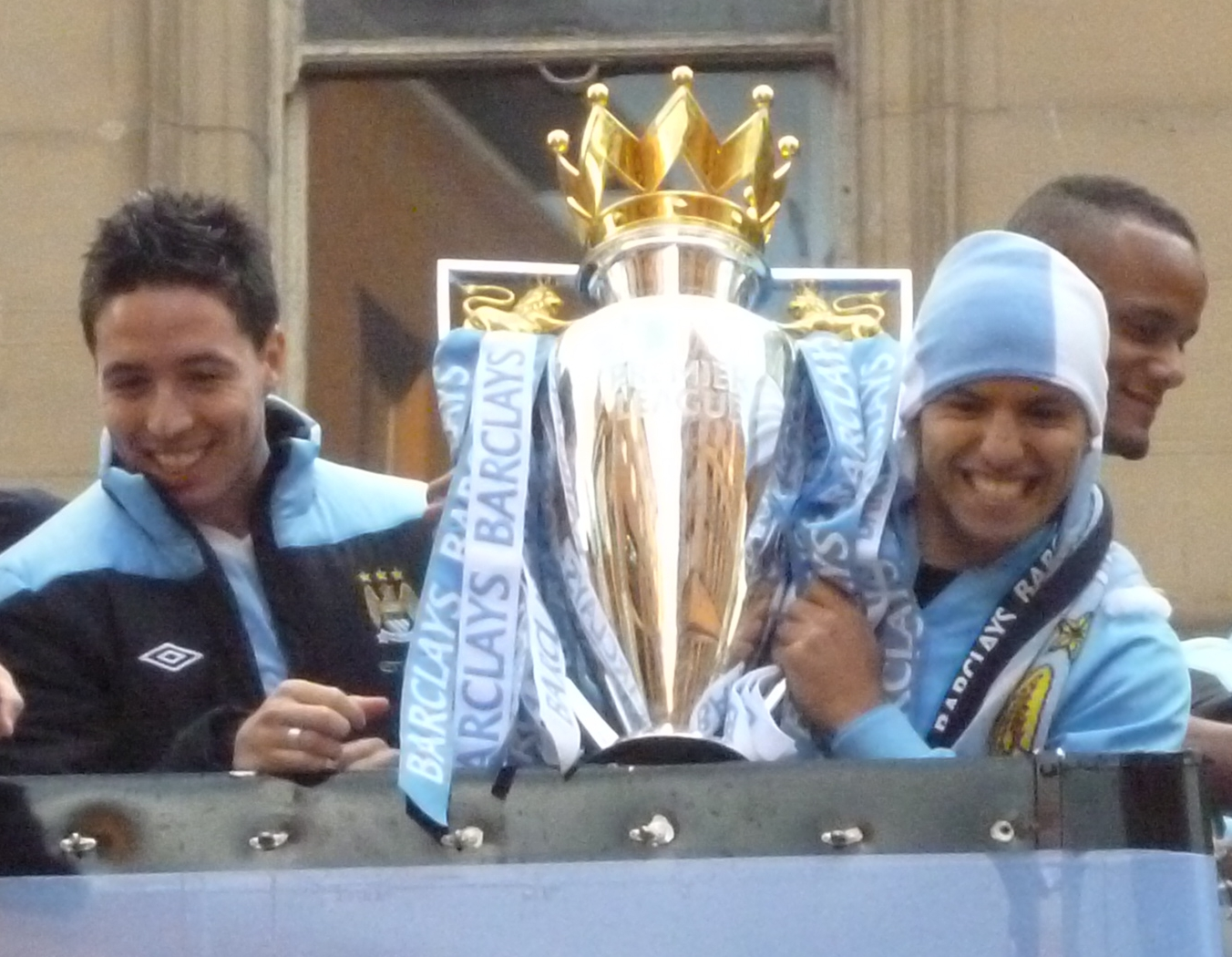
Nasri (left) and Sergio Agüero parade the Premier League trophy, May 2012

On 24 August 2011, it was confirmed Nasri had joined Premier League club Manchester City. The transfer fee was priced in the region of £25 million, and the player signed a four-year contract.

==== 2011–12 season ====
Nasri made his club debut on 28 August in a league fixture away to Tottenham Hotspur. In the match, he assisted on three goals as Manchester City cruised to a 5–1 win. In the team's next match following the September international break, Nasri assisted on one of Sergio Agüero's three goals in a 3–0 win over Wigan Athletic. On 1 October, he scored his first goal for the club, scoring the third goal in a 4–0 victory, also assisting on two other goals. After nearly two months without a league goal, on 3 December, Nasri scored his second goal for Manchester City, converting a free-kick in a 5–1 win against Norwich City. In the following month, Nasri scored his third goal for the club in a 3–2 win against Tottenham. On 21 March 2012, he scored the game-winning goal in a 2–1 win over Chelsea after receiving a through-ball from teammate Carlos Tevez. On 22 April, he scored in a 2–0 away win against Wolverhampton Wanderers. On 13 May, Nasri won his first Premier League trophy as Manchester City were crowned Premier League champions for the 2011–12 season after defeating Queens Park Rangers 3–2.

==== 2012–13 season ====
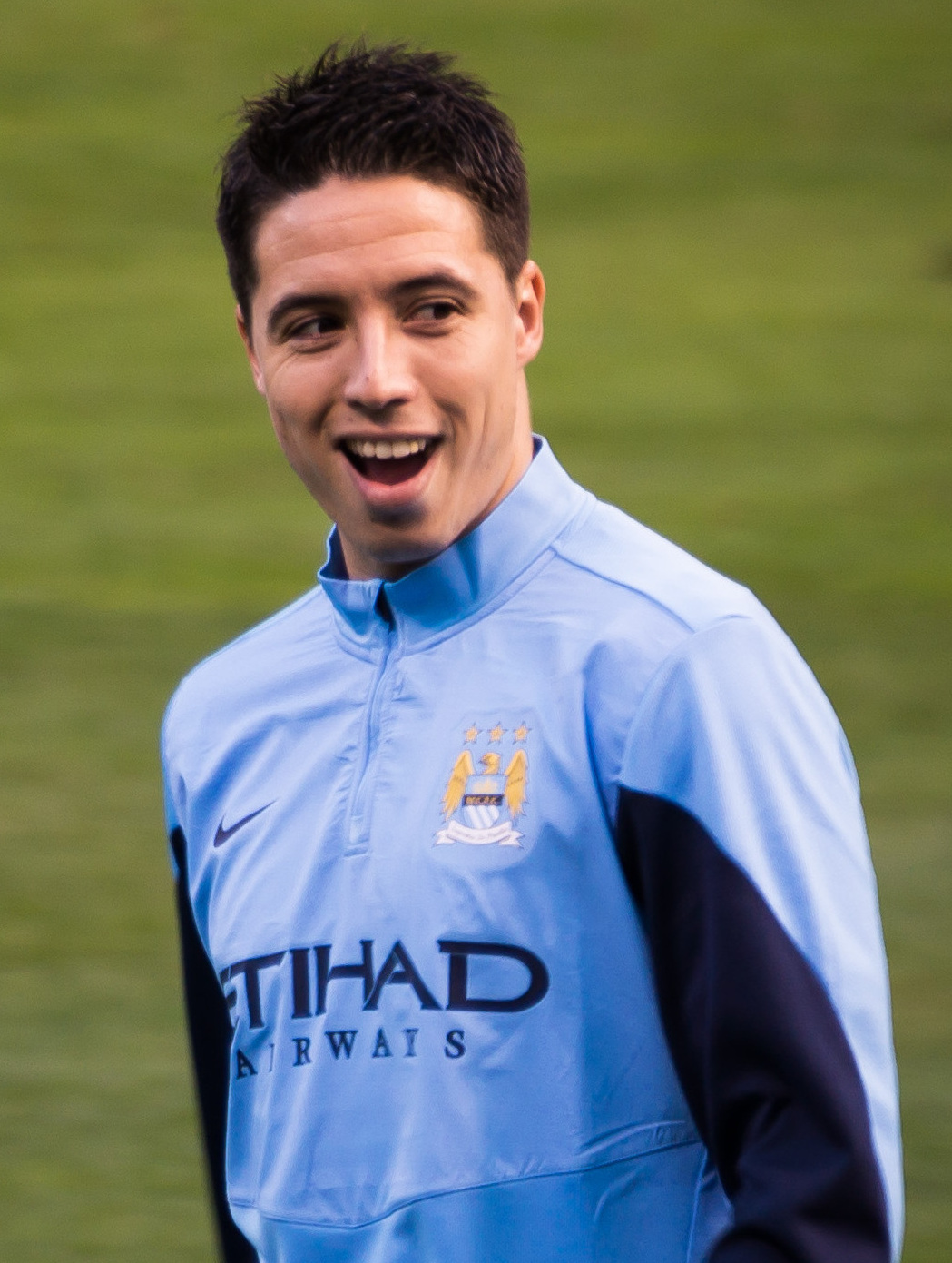
Nasri before a friendly game against Chelsea in May 2013

At the start of the 2012–13 season, Nasri switched his squad number from 19 to 8. On 12 August, Nasri scored and assisted a goal in the 2012 Community Shield, a 3–2 win against FA Cup winners Chelsea. A week later, on the opening day of the 2012–13 Premier League, he scored and assisted again in a 3–2 win against newly promoted Southampton. He then scored against Ajax in a 3–1 loss in the UEFA Champions League group stage. In December 2012, Nasri was criticised for not blocking Robin van Persie's winning goal for Manchester United in the Manchester Derby.

In March 2013, after a man of the match performance in a 4–0 win against Newcastle United, Manchester City manager Roberto Mancini said he "would like to give [Nasri] a punch" due to his inconsistent form. On 14 April, Nasri scored the opening goal as City defeated Chelsea 2–1 in the FA Cup semi-final.

==== 2013–14 season ====
Nasri scored his first goal of the 2013–14 season in the match against Manchester United in a 4–1 win. On 5 November, he provided assists for goals by Sergio Agüero and Álvaro Negredo as City cruised by CSKA Moscow 5–2 to advance to the knockout stages of the Champions League for the first time in club history. On 1 December, Nasri scored twice in a 3–0 win over Swansea City.

On 2 March 2014, Nasri scored the second goal as Manchester City defeated Sunderland 3–1 to win the 2014 League Cup final. For his performance in the final, Nasri received the Alan Hardaker Trophy, given to the Man of the Match.

In a crucial Premier League match away to Everton on 3 May, Nasri provided the assist for Edin Džeko's game-winning goal as City came from behind to win 3–2 and go top of the table with two matches remaining. On 11 May, Nasri scored Manchester City's opening goal in a 2–0 defeat of West Ham United as the club won the 2013–14 Premier League title.

==== Later years ====
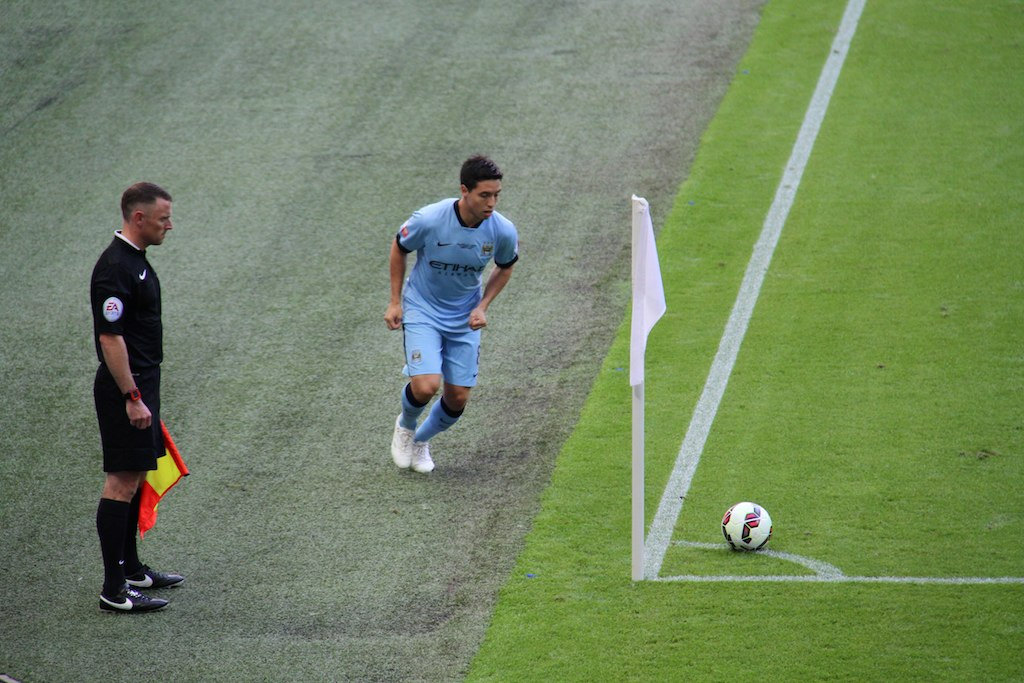
Nasri taking a corner-kick during the 2014 FA Community Shield against Arsenal

Nasri signed a new five-year contract deal with Manchester City on 10 July 2014, which kept him at the club until 2017.

On 22 November 2015, Manuel Pellegrini confirmed Nasri would miss four-to-five months of action because of a tendon injury sustained in training. On 10 April 2016, during his first match back from injury, he scored the match-winning goal against West Bromwich Albion as Manchester City won 2–1.

==== Sevilla (loan) ====
On 31 August 2016, Nasri joined Spanish club Sevilla on a season-long loan deal. Having overcome muscular problems, he made his debut in La Liga nine days later in a 2–1 home win over Las Palmas, in which he completed over 90% of his 69 attempted passes and ran more distance than any player other than teammate Steven Nzonzi.

Nasri played 30 games in all competitions and scored three goals during his spell at the Ramón Sánchez Pizjuán Stadium. He netted the only goal of a Champions League group win away to Dinamo Zagreb in the Champions League group stage, but was sent off in a 2–0 loss away to Leicester City in the second leg of the last 16. After the game, he accused opponent Jamie Vardy of diving to convince the referee to show a second yellow card; Vardy denied the accusation.

=== Antalyaspor ===
On 21 August 2017, Nasri signed for Turkish side Antalyaspor on a two-year contract for a reported €3.5 million transfer fee. On 31 January 2018, Nasri mutually terminated his contract with the club, having made eight appearances and scored two goals in the Süper Lig during his five-month stay.

=== Doping ban ===
On 22 February 2018, Nasri was given a six-month ban from football by UEFA, for breaching WADA rules in December 2016 by receiving an intravenous drip of 500 millilitres of water containing nutrients. On 1 August 2018, Nasri's ban was increased by an extra 12 months following an appeal from UEFA's ethics and disciplinary inspector. The ban was back-dated to 1 July 2017.

=== West Ham United ===
With his ban from football due to finish on 31 December 2018, Nasri began training with West Ham United and undertook a medical in the hopes of signing a short-term contract. When the sanction ended, Nasri signed a short-term deal with West Ham until the end of the 2018–19 season. In May 2019, West Ham announced that Nasri would leave the club at the end of his contract in June 2019. He was released by West Ham at the end of the 2018–19 season.

=== Anderlecht ===
On 5 July 2019, Nasri signed for Belgian club Anderlecht on a free transfer. He was signed by their new player-manager, his former Manchester City captain Vincent Kompany.

Nasri made his debut for Les Mauves on 28 July as the season began with a 2–1 home loss to Oostende. On 17 August he scored his first goal in the fourth match, a 4–2 loss at Kortrijk, and on 25 September he opened a 3–2 extra time win away to Beerschot in the sixth round of the Belgian Cup. From October, he suffered from injuries to the hamstrings and adductor muscles.

In April 2020, with football suspended due to the COVID-19 pandemic, Nasri was released, ending his Anderlecht spell with eight games and two goals in all competitions. He told Le Journal du Dimanche in September 2021 that he had retired from professional football.

== International career ==
=== Youth ===
Nasri has earned caps with all of France's youth teams for which he was eligible. He is a member of the group, commonly known as the "Génération 1987" which produced internationals Hatem Ben Arfa, Karim Benzema and Jérémy Ménez, alongside himself. With the under-16 team, Nasri made 16 appearances and scored eight goals. Of the four players, Nasri was the first player to become a regular starter in the team under coach François Blaquart and made his debut in the team's opening match of the campaign against Spain. France won the match 3–0. Nasri scored his first goal for the team on 29 October in its first group stage match against Sweden at the Tournoi du Val-de-Marne. On 11 December, Nasri scored the opening goal in the team's 6–1 defeat of Greece. At the 2003 Aegean Cup in Turkey, he scored two goals in four matches as France finished the competition in third place. Nasri scored in the team's second group stage match against Israel, a 3–1 win. In the next group stage match, he scored a goal in 5–0 win over Ukraine. In the third place match against Belgium, Nasri assisted on a goal scored by Ben Arfa. At the Tournoi de Montaigu, Nasri scored his only goal in the team's 8–0 win over Gabon in the team's opening group match. France finished the competition runner-up to Italy, who defeated France 5–1 in the final match.

At under-17 level, Nasri, Menez and Ben Arfa were joined by Karim Benzema and tasked with the goal of winning the 2004 UEFA European Under-17 Championship on home soil. Nasri made his debut with the team in the opening match of the season against Sweden, scoring a goal in a 5–2 victory. In the team's second straight yearly appearance at the Tournoi du Val-de-Marne, Nasri scored his lone goal in the competition against the United States in a 2–0 win as France were declared champions without conceding a goal. At the 2004 UEFA European Under-17 Championship, Nasri scored against Portugal in the competition's semi-finals. France went on to win the match 3–1 to earn a place in the final. In the final match, France faced Spain. In the match, Nasri scored the game-winning goal to give France its first-ever title in the competition. In total with the under-17s, he made 16 appearances and scored six goals. Due to increased playing time at his parent club Marseille, Nasri's stint with the under-18 team was uneventful, appearing in only four matches.

The foursome of Nasri, Ben Arfa, Benzema and Ménez returned to international play together for under-19 duty. The four were joined by Issiar Dia, Blaise Matuidi and Serge Gakpé with the objective of winning the 2006 UEFA European Under-19 Championship. The team opened the campaign with two friendly matches against Norway. Over the course of the two matches, Nasri scored two goals: one in a 4–0 win and another in a 5–0 victory. In the first round of qualification for the tournament, Nasri assisted on two goals in the team's 3–1 win over Wales. In the team's next group stage match against San Marino, he scored the third goal in a 3–0 victory. In the final group match against Austria, Nasri scored the opening goal and provided the assist on a Benzema goal in a 2–0 win. In the final round of qualification, despite finishing the round undefeated, France were eliminated after being beaten on points by Scotland. Nasri earned his first call up to the under-21 team under coach René Girard in the team's first match following the 2006 UEFA European Under-21 Championship against Belgium. He started the match and was replaced at half-time by Florent Sinama Pongolle. He featured in qualification matches for the 2007 UEFA European Under-21 Championship and appeared as a substitute in both legs of the team's surprising defeat to Israel in the qualifying playoffs. Despite still being eligible to represent the team until 2009, his appearance in the second leg defeat to Israel was Nasri's last with the team.

=== Senior ===
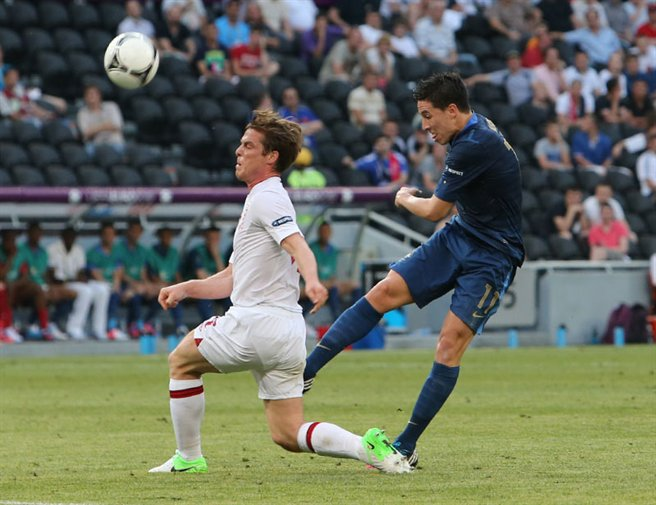
Nasri and Scott Parker at Euro 2012

On 15 March 2007, Nasri was called up to the senior team for the first time by coach Raymond Domenech for UEFA Euro 2008 qualifying match against Lithuania and a friendly against Austria. Nasri said he was "very happy and very proud" to be called into the national team, stating that the call-up was all the more satisfying as the game was an important European Championship qualifier. He appeared on the bench in the match against Lithuania, but failed to make an appearance. Nasri made his international debut on 28 March against Austria at age 19. He started the match and was involved with the only goal, delivering the free-kick from which Karim Benzema scored. Nasri returned to the team in June for matches and, on 6 June, scored his first international goal in a 1–0 Euro qualifying win over Georgia.

On 16 November 2007, Nasri scored his second international goal in a friendly match against Morocco. As a result of his performances, he was named in the 23-man squad to participate in Euro 2008. Nasri made his debut in the tournament on 9 June 2008 in the team's opening group stage match against Romania, appearing as a substitute. He did not appear in the team's 4–1 loss to the Netherlands, but did appear in the team's final group stage match against Italy. Nasri appeared as a substitute for the injured Franck Ribéry in the tenth minute. Following defender's Eric Abidal's red card in the 24th minute, Nasri was taken out of the match in order for defender Jean-Alain Boumsong to take Abidal's spot in the lineup.

"When I started out in the French national side, Henry had been out with a back injury and I had been sitting in a place on the coach which, on his return, turned out to be where he sat. As soon as I discovered that I got up and let him sit down. Many people were looking for excuses because we had done badly in the Euros but I certainly don't think you can blame that on the fact that I sat in Thierry Henry's seat."

— Nasri on the issue brought up by Gallas.

In November 2008, Nasri was one of a group of young players who were accused of being insolent during the team's campaign at Euro 2008. The accusation came from domestic teammate William Gallas, who made the charge in his autobiography. Though not explicitly named in the book, Nasri was widely identified as the player in question. In 2010, after failing to make the 2010 World Cup squad, Nasri opened up about the situation, stating that during Gallas' final year at Arsenal, Nasri was one of "four or five" Arsenal players who did not speak to the defender. The feud culminated on 20 November 2010 when Nasri lived up to a pledge he would not shake the hand of Gallas, who was then playing for Tottenham Hotspur, during the pre-match build-up.

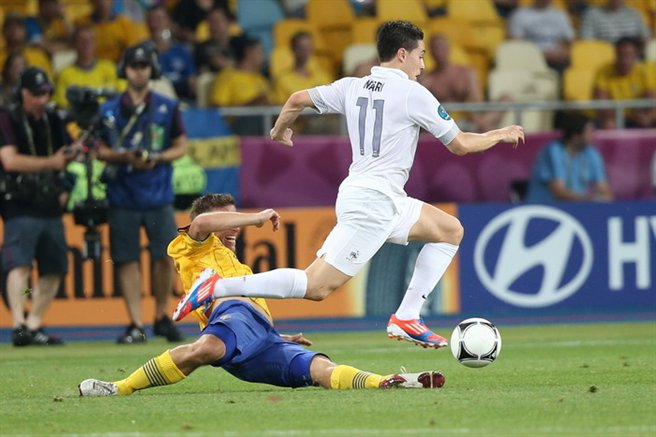
Nasri dribbles past a Sweden defender at UEFA Euro 2012

In the 2008–09 season, Nasri appeared in only three matches with the national team. After playing against Lithuania on 28 March 2009, the midfielder went uncapped for the almost a year and a half. During the 2009–10 season, Nasri grew weary of his chances of appearing with the team at the 2010 FIFA World Cup. In the end, he did not appear with the team, failing to make the 23-man squad or even the preliminary squad.

Nasri returned to the national team under the reign of new coach Laurent Blanc for the team's friendly against Norway on 11 August 2010. He missed the September call-ups due to injury before returning to the team in October for Euro 2012 qualifying matches against Romania and Luxembourg. On 25 March 2011, Nasri captained the national team for the first time in its 2–0 Euro qualification win over Luxembourg. He provided the assist on the opening goal scored by Philippe Mexès. In the team's final Euro qualifier against Bosnia and Herzegovina, Nasri scored the equalizing goal, converting a penalty in a 1–1 draw. The point gained from the stalemate secured a Euro 2012 qualifying spot for France. After appearing regularly in qualifying for Euro 2012, on 29 May 2012, Nasri was named to the squad to participate in the competition. In the team's opening group stage match against England, he scored the equalizing goal in a 1–1 draw.

After France lost to Spain in the quarter-finals, Nasri subjected a reporter to what was described as a "foul-mouthed tirade" when asked for his views on the match. For that and other misdemeanours, the French Football Federation (FFF) imposed a three-match international ban.

On 13 May 2014, France manager Didier Deschamps revealed his 23-man squad for the 2014 World Cup, omitting Nasri.

On 9 August 2014, at age 27, Nasri confirmed his decision to retire from international football.

== Style of play ==
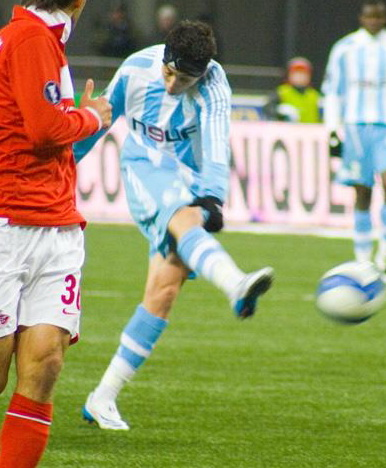
Nasri in a 2008 UEFA Cup match with Marseille against Spartak Moscow

In his early years at Marseille, Nasri was deployed in several positions, most notably as a deep-lying midfielder and a wide midfielder primarily on the right side as he was deemed too small to play in the middle of the park. After two years of developing his physical traits, in the 2006–07 season, manager Albert Emon inserted Nasri into the playmaker role, where his vision, passing, technical skill and ability to read and understand the game suited him. Since that season, Nasri was primarily deployed in the position or as a central attacking midfielder at both club and international level. The player personally said that playing centrally was his preference. As a result of his versatility, Nasri could also function on the wing and spent the majority of his career at Arsenal occupying the role in the team's 4–3–3 formation. His close control with the ball, speed, dribbling, crossing, and ability to use both feet suited the position well, which resulted in former manager Arsène Wenger deploying Nasri in the role during the player's four-year stay at the club. Nasri often featured centrally for Arsenal in the absence of former club captain Cesc Fàbregas.

In 2009, in order to accommodate the arrival of Russian attacker Andrey Arshavin, it was recommended by both Wenger and then-France national team coach Raymond Domenech that Nasri revert to his role as a deep-lying midfielder so the player could showcase his underrated defensive abilities. Nasri was also an underrated direct free kick and penalty kick taker. The player had previously developed a superstition with regards to taking spot kicks, but conquered the issue after successfully converting two penalties in the team's League Cup victory over Tottenham Hotspur in 2010. Wenger described Nasri as a "young, quick and technically outstanding player". He was described in a similar fashion by club scout Gilles Grimandi, who stated that Nasri was "a fantastic athlete, he's quick, flexible and good with his feet". Nasri's playing style, ability and cultural background drew comparisons to Zinedine Zidane. After joining Arsenal and excelling on the wing, the English media began comparing him to former club player and compatriot Robert Pires.

== Career statistics ==
=== Club ===
Appearances and goals by club, season and competition
Club	Season	League			National cup (Note: Includes Coupe de France, FA Cup, Copa del Rey, Belgian Cup)		League cup (Note: Includes Coupe de la Ligue, League Cup)		Europe		Other		Total	
Club	Season	Division	Apps	Goals	Apps	Goals	Apps	Goals	Apps	Goals	Apps	Goals	Apps	Goals
Marseille	2004–05	Ligue 1	24	1	1	0	0	0	—		—		25	1
Marseille	2005–06	Ligue 1	30	1	5	0	0	0	14 (Note: Four appearances and one goal in UEFA Intertoto Cup, ten appearances in UEFA Cup)	1	—		49	2
Marseille	2006–07	Ligue 1	37	3	6	0	1	0	6 (Note: Two appearances in UEFA Intertoto Cup, four appearances in UEFA Cup)	0	—		50	3
Marseille	2007–08	Ligue 1	30	6	2	0	2	0	8 (Note: Four appearances in UEFA Champions League, four appearances in UEFA Cup)	0	—		42	6
Marseille	Total		121	11	14	0	3	0	28	1	—		166	12
Arsenal	2008–09	Premier League	29	6	5	0	0	0	10 (Note: Appearance(s) in UEFA Champions League)	1	—		44	7
Arsenal	2009–10	Premier League	26	2	1	0	1	0	6	3	—		34	5
Arsenal	2010–11	Premier League	30	10	4	1	4	2	8	2	—		46	15
Arsenal	2011–12	Premier League	1	0	0	0	0	0	0	0	—		1	0
Arsenal	Total		86	18	10	1	5	2	24	6	—		125	27
Manchester City	2011–12	Premier League	31	5	1	0	4	1	10 (Note: Six appearances in UEFA Champions League, four appearances in UEFA Europa League)	0	—		46	6
Manchester City	2012–13	Premier League	27	2	3	1	0	0	6	1	1 (Note: Appearance in FA Community Shield)	1	37	5
Manchester City	2013–14	Premier League	34	7	2	2	3	1	7	1	—		46	11
Manchester City	2014–15	Premier League	24	2	1	0	1	0	6	1	1	0	33	3
Manchester City	2015–16	Premier League	12	2	0	0	0	0	1	0	—		13	2
Manchester City	2016–17	Premier League	1	0	0	0	0	0	0	0	—		1	0
Manchester City	Total		129	18	7	3	8	2	30	3	2	1	176	27
Sevilla (loan)	2016–17	La Liga	23	2	2	0	—		5	1	—		30	3
Antalyaspor	2017–18	Süper Lig	8	2	0	0	—		—		—		8	2
West Ham United	2018–19	Premier League	5	0	1	0	0	0	—		—		6	0
Anderlecht	2019–20	Belgian Pro League	7	1	1	1	—		—		—		8	2
Career total			379	52	35	5	16	4	87	11	2	1	519	73

=== International ===
Appearances and goals by national team and year
National team	Year	Apps	Goals
France	2007	7	2
France	2008	7	0
France	2009	1	0
France	2010	4	0
France	2011	8	1
France	2012	8	1
France	2013	6	1
Total		41	5

Scores and results list France's goal tally first, score column indicates score after each Nasri goal.

List of international goals scored by Samir Nasri
No.	Date	Venue	Opponent	Score	Result	Competition
1	6 June 2007	Stade de l'Abbé Deschamps, Auxerre, France	Georgia	1–0	1–0	UEFA Euro 2008 qualification
2	16 November 2007	Stade de France, Saint-Denis, France	Morocco	2–1	2–2	Friendly
3	11 October 2011	Stade de France, Saint-Denis, France	Bosnia and Herzegovina	1–1	1–1	UEFA Euro 2012 qualification
4	11 June 2012	Donbas Arena, Donetsk, Ukraine	England	1–1	1–1	UEFA Euro 2012
5	10 September 2013	Central Stadium, Gomel, Belarus	Belarus	3–2	4–2	2014 FIFA World Cup qualification

== Honours ==
Marseille

- UEFA Intertoto Cup: 2005
- Coupe de France runner-up: 2005-06 2006-07

Arsenal

- Football League Cup runner-up: 2010–11

Manchester City

- Premier League: 2011–12, 2013–14
- Football League Cup: 2013–14
- FA Community Shield: 2012
- FA Cup runner-up: 2012–13

France U17

- UEFA European Under-17 Championship: 2004

Individual

- UNFP Ligue 1 Young Player of the Year: 2006–07
- UNFP Ligue 1 Team of the Year: 2006–07
- Premier League Player of the Month: December 2010
- French Player of the Year: 2010
- PFA Fans' Player of the Month: October 2010, December 2010, January 2011
- PFA Team of the Year: 2010–11 Premier League
- Nominated for the Best at Sport award at the British Muslim Awards: 2013
- Alan Hardaker Trophy: 2014
