= 2014 Football League Cup final =

- Match programme cover
- Event: 2013–14 Football League Cup
Manchester City	Sunderland
3	1
- Date: 2 March 2014
- Venue: Wembley Stadium, London
- Man of the Match: Samir Nasri (Manchester City)
- Referee: Martin Atkinson (West Riding of Yorkshire)
- Attendance: 84,697
- Weather: Light rain 8 °C (46 °F)

The 2014 Football League Cup final was a football match that took place on 2 March 2014 at Wembley Stadium, London. It was the final match of the 2013–14 Football League Cup, the 54th season of the Football League Cup, a football competition for the 92 teams in the Premier League and The Football League.

The match was contested by Premier League clubs Manchester City and Sunderland. Manchester City appeared in their fourth League Cup final, and made their sixth Wembley visit since 2011. Sunderland appeared in their second League Cup final, their first visit to Wembley since 1998 when they lost to Charlton Athletic in the First Division play-off final.

By winning the final, Manchester City would have qualified for the third qualifying round of the 2014–15 Europa League, but they qualified for the Champions League via their league position. Thus, the Europa League berth was given to Tottenham Hotspur, the team that finished sixth in the Premier League.

== Route to the final ==
=== Manchester City ===
Round	Opponents	Score	Report
3rd	Wigan Athletic (H)	5–0	Report
4th	Newcastle United (A)	0–2 (a.e.t.)	Report
5th	Leicester City (A)	1–3	Report
SF	West Ham United (H)	6–0	Report
SF	West Ham United (A)	0–3	Report

Manchester City began their League Cup campaign in the Third Round due to their involvement in the UEFA Champions League. In that round, they were drawn against Football League Championship team and FA Cup holders, Wigan Athletic, who had defeated them 1–0 in the previous season's FA Cup final. This time, Manchester City won 5–0 at their City of Manchester Stadium, in a game played on 24 September 2013. Edin Džeko's goal, set up by a flick over the defence from Fernandinho, gave City a lead to take into the half-time interval. Debutant Stevan Jovetić then scored on the rebound in the 60th minute, after which Wigan collapsed, with Jesús Navas also scoring his first goal for the club, followed by Yaya Touré and a second goal for Jovetić to complete the scoring.

In the Fourth Round, Manchester City were drawn away to fellow Premier League team Newcastle United on 30 October 2013. With the scores level at 0–0 after 90 minutes, the tie went to extra time, where City managed to score twice – the first a tap-in for Álvaro Negredo, before James Milner played Džeko into space as he rounded the 'keeper for City's second.

The Fifth Round saw Manchester City drawn away to Championship team Leicester City on 17 December 2013. With City coming off the back of a poor run of away form, they sought to take control of the game early and established a lead through Aleksandar Kolarov's free kick in the eighth minute. Two goals from Džeko gave City a strong lead by the hour mark, although a Lloyd Dyer goal restored some pride for the home team.

In the two-legged semi-final, Manchester City were drawn with fellow Premier League team West Ham United, although the fixtures saw the two teams on opposite runs of form. While City had become a free-scoring unit, not having lost away in six weeks, West Ham came into the first leg on the back of a humiliating 5–0 defeat in the FA Cup against Championship team Nottingham Forest, in the Premier League relegation zone, and with their strikers struggling for goals. City, on the other hand, had recently regained second spot in the league, were still in all competitions and close to setting the record for the fewest games taken to 100 goals in all competitions in English top flight history, a landmark subsequently achieved between the two legs.

The pace was set early in the first leg, as Touré lofted a ball from his own half all the way to Negredo in the London club's penalty area; the Spanish striker scored with a single touch, to give City the lead in the 12th minute. Negredo earned his second after playing a neat one-two with Džeko through West Ham's defence, while Touré dribbled half the length of the pitch to record his first of the game and give City a three-goal cushion at the half-way mark. Negredo completed his hat-trick at the start of the second half after a series of passes in the West Ham area, while Džeko completed the rout with two goals in the final half-hour, both powerful placed shots resulting from crosses from the by-line. As a consequence of this result, West Ham United reduced children's ticket prices to the second leg at the Boleyn Ground.

Manchester City secured their place in the final after a 3–0 victory in the second leg at Upton Park on 21 January 2014. Seeking to take any bite out of the game, City put the result out of question with a third-minute goal from Negredo, before Sergio Agüero, returning from injury in his first start since December, scored in the 24th minute to put them 8–0 up on aggregate. The game was sealed in the 59th minute as Negredo weaved through the Hammers' defence before clipping the ball over the keeper even as the angle appeared to have been narrowed too far. The goal meant Negredo and Džeko went into the final as the competition's joint top scorers on six goals each. The 9–0 aggregate victory was both a competition record for the highest winning margin in the semi-final (a record previously held by West Ham themselves), and a club record for the highest aggregate win in all competitions.

=== Sunderland ===
Round	Opponents	Score	Report
2nd	MK Dons (H)	4–2	Report
3rd	Peterborough United (H)	2–0	Report
4th	Southampton (H)	2–1	Report
5th	Chelsea (H)	2–1 (a.e.t.)	Report
SF	Manchester United (H)	2–1	Report
SF	Manchester United (A)	2–1 (a.e.t.); 1–2 (pen.)	Report

Sunderland made their way to the final after starting in the Second Round, as they were a Premier League team not involved in either the UEFA Champions League or the UEFA Europa League. In that round, they defeated Football League One side Milton Keynes Dons 4–2 at Sunderland's Stadium of Light. Trailing 2–0 with 15 minutes remaining, Jozy Altidore, Connor Wickham (2) and Adam Johnson scoring late goals to secure the win for Sunderland. In the Third Round, they drew League One side Peterborough United, whom they defeated 2–0 at the Stadium of Light. This game marked Kevin Ball's first win while in temporary charge of the Black Cats, following Paolo Di Canio's sacking. In the Fourth Round, Sunderland (now managed by Gus Poyet) defeated fellow Premier League team Southampton, again at the Stadium of Light, 2–1.

In the Fifth Round, they were drawn against fellow Premier League team Chelsea, once again at the Stadium of Light. The Black Cats found themselves 1–0 down after a Frank Lampard shot deflected in off Lee Cattermole a minute after half time. However, former Chelsea striker Fabio Borini equalised in the 88th minute to take the game to extra time. With penalties looming, Ki Sung-yueng scored two minutes from the final whistle to give Sunderland a 2–1 win and passage to the semi-finals.

In the semi-final, they were drawn with reigning Premier League champions Manchester United. In the first leg, the Black Cats battled to a 2–1 victory at the Stadium of Light; a Ryan Giggs own goal gave the home side the lead on the stroke of half time, Nemanja Vidić levelled for the visitors in the second half before Tom Cleverley fouled Adam Johnson in the box, and Borini converted the penalty. Almost 9,000 Sunderland fans travelled to Manchester for the second leg on 22 January, with the club providing free coaches for their supporters. In the second leg at Old Trafford, Sunderland secured their place in the final in dramatic fashion. United led 1–0 after 90 minutes thanks to a headed goal from former Sunderland loanee Jonny Evans to take the tie to extra time. Due to the away goals rule becoming active, Sunderland needed to score to avoid elimination. In the 119th minute, a shot from Phil Bardsley (six years to the day after he joined Sunderland from United) was pushed into his own goal by United's goalkeeper David de Gea, sparking celebrations from the Sunderland players and fans. However, United immediately attacked down the other end, where Javier Hernández scored to make the score 2–1 on the night and 3–3 on aggregate, sending the game to a penalty shoot-out, which Sunderland won 2–1. Vito Mannone saved two penalties, including the decisive one from Rafael, to send the Black Cats to the new Wembley for the first time.

== Build-up ==
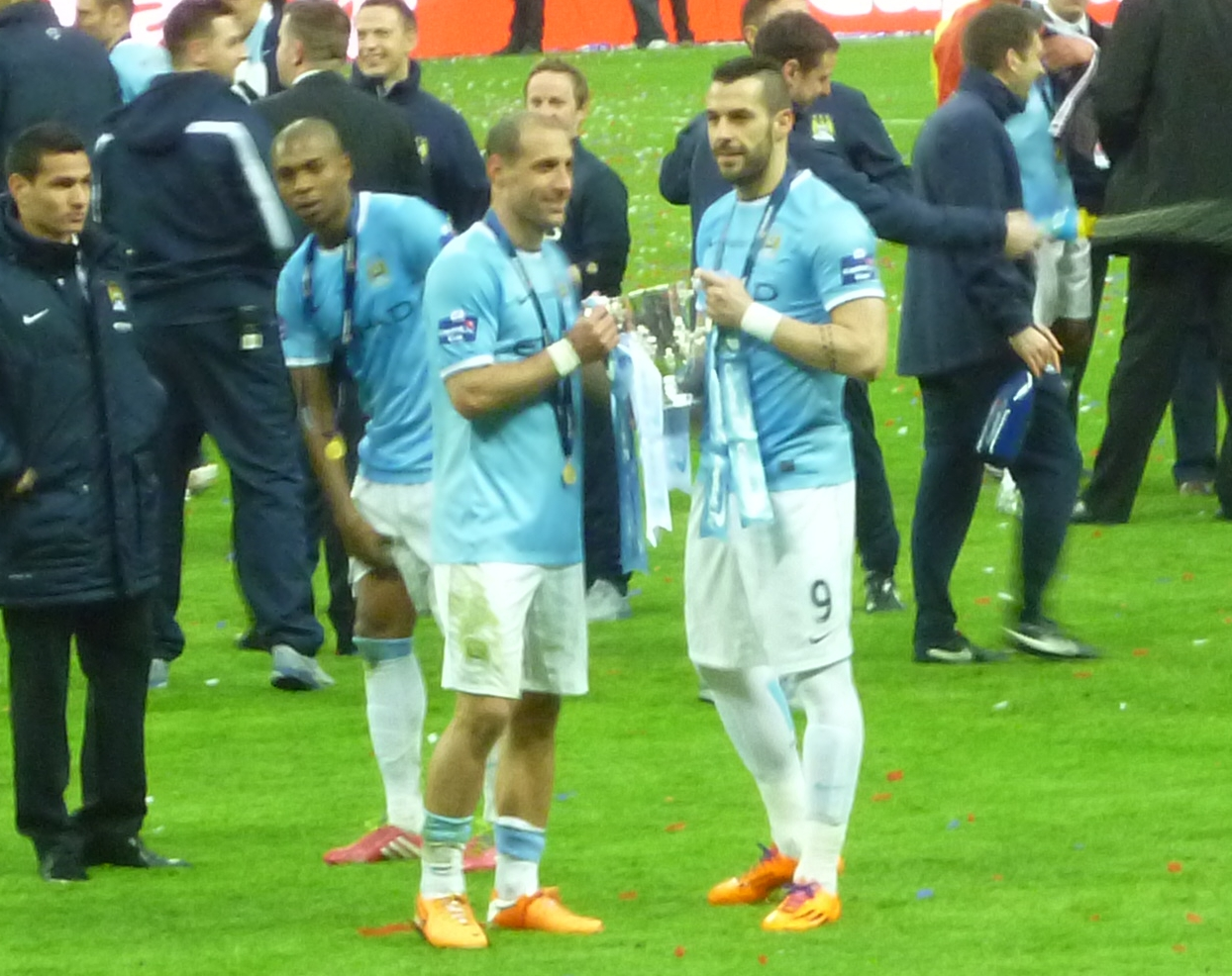
Manchester City's Pablo Zabaleta and Álvaro Negredo holding the trophy after the final

Sunderland were appearing in their first League Cup final since 1985, when they lost 1–0 to Norwich City.

Each club received an allocation of 31,580 tickets for the match, priced between £40 and £100.

== Match ==
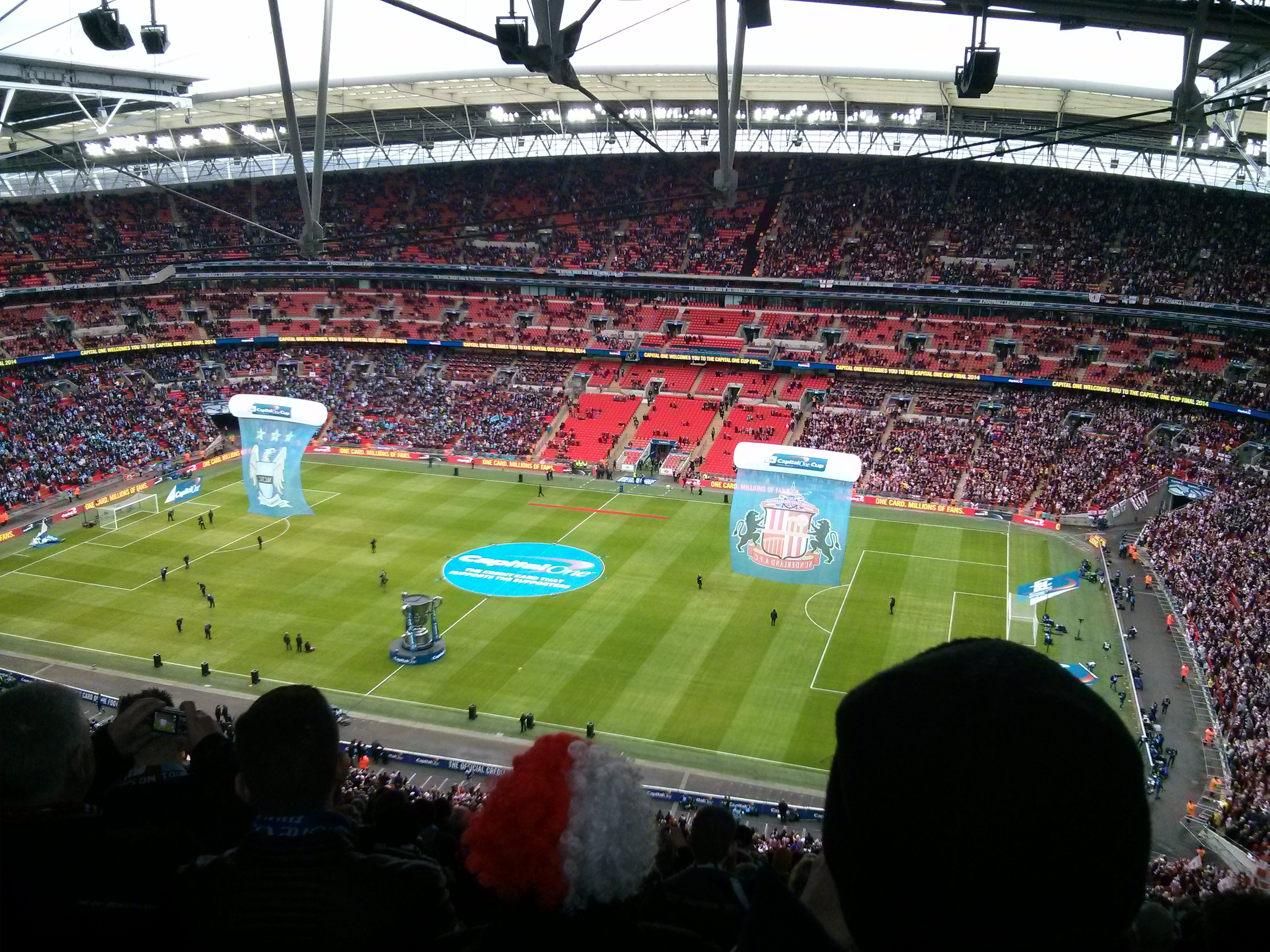
Before kick-off

=== Summary ===
Sunderland took the lead in the 10th minute, when a ball over the top from Adam Johnson found Fabio Borini, who held off the challenge of Vincent Kompany before slotting the ball into the bottom right corner of Costel Pantilimon's goal. Borini was played through again later in the first half, but Kompany made amends with a successful last-ditch sliding challenge. Sunderland held their lead until half time; however, they were undone by two City goals after the break. In the 55th minute, Yaya Touré curled the ball into the top-left corner of Vito Mannone's goal from 25 yards out, and almost immediately from kick off City attacked again, with Samir Nasri firing home from the outside of his boot from a deflected Aleksandar Kolarov cross, leaving Mannone standing. Sunderland pressed for an equaliser, with substitute Steven Fletcher wasting a last-minute chance by failing to control the ball, before Jesús Navas finished off a swift City counter-attack in stoppage time to seal their first League Cup win since 1976.

=== Details ===
2 March 2014
14:00 GMT

Manchester City	3–1	Sunderland
Touré 55'; Nasri 56'; Navas 90'	Report	Borini 10'

Wembley Stadium, London
Attendance: 84,697
Referee: Martin Atkinson (West Yorkshire)

Manchester City	Sunderland

GK	30	(Romania) Costel Pantilimon
RB	5	(Argentina) Pablo Zabaleta
CB	4	(Belgium) Vincent Kompany (c)
CB	26	(Argentina) Martín Demichelis
LB	13	(Serbia) Aleksandar Kolarov
RM	8	(France) Samir Nasri
CM	42	(Ivory Coast) Yaya Touré
CM	25	(Brazil) Fernandinho
LM	21	(Spain) David Silva		(substituted off) 77'
CF	10	(Bosnia and Herzegovina) Edin Džeko		(substituted off) 88'
CF	16	(Argentina) Sergio Agüero		(substituted off) 58'
Substitutes:
GK	1	(England) Joe Hart
DF	6	(England) Joleon Lescott
DF	22	(France) Gaël Clichy
MF	7	(England) James Milner
MF	14	(Spain) Javi García		(substituted on) 77'
MF	15	(Spain) Jesús Navas		(substituted on) 58'
FW	9	(Spain) Álvaro Negredo	(yellow card) 90+3'	(substituted on) 88'
Manager:
(Chile) Manuel Pellegrini

GK	25	(Italy) Vito Mannone
RB	2	(Scotland) Phil Bardsley
CB	5	(England) Wes Brown
CB	16	(Republic of Ireland) John O'Shea (c)
LB	28	(Spain) Marcos Alonso	(yellow card) 82'
DM	7	(Sweden) Sebastian Larsson		(substituted off) 60'
DM	33	(England) Lee Cattermole		(substituted off) 77'
CM	4	(South Korea) Ki Sung-Yueng
RW	11	(England) Adam Johnson		(substituted off) 60'
LW	14	(England) Jack Colback
CF	31	(Italy) Fabio Borini
Substitutes:
GK	32	(Argentina) Oscar Ustari
DF	12	(Czech Republic) Ondřej Čelůstka
DF	27	(Argentina) Santiago Vergini
MF	8	(England) Craig Gardner		(substituted on) 60'
MF	23	(Italy) Emanuele Giaccherini		(substituted on) 77'
FW	9	(Scotland) Steven Fletcher		(substituted on) 60'
FW	30	(Argentina) Ignacio Scocco
Manager:
(Uruguay) Gus Poyet

Man of the Match

- Samir Nasri (Manchester City)

Match officials

- Assistant referees:
  - Steve Child
  - Simon Long
- Fourth official: Neil Swarbrick
- Reserve assistant referee: Harry Lennard

Match rules

- 90 minutes
- 30 minutes of extra time if necessary
- Penalty shootout if scores still level
- Seven named substitutes, of which three may be used
