= Rubén Cousillas =

Argentine footballer and manager

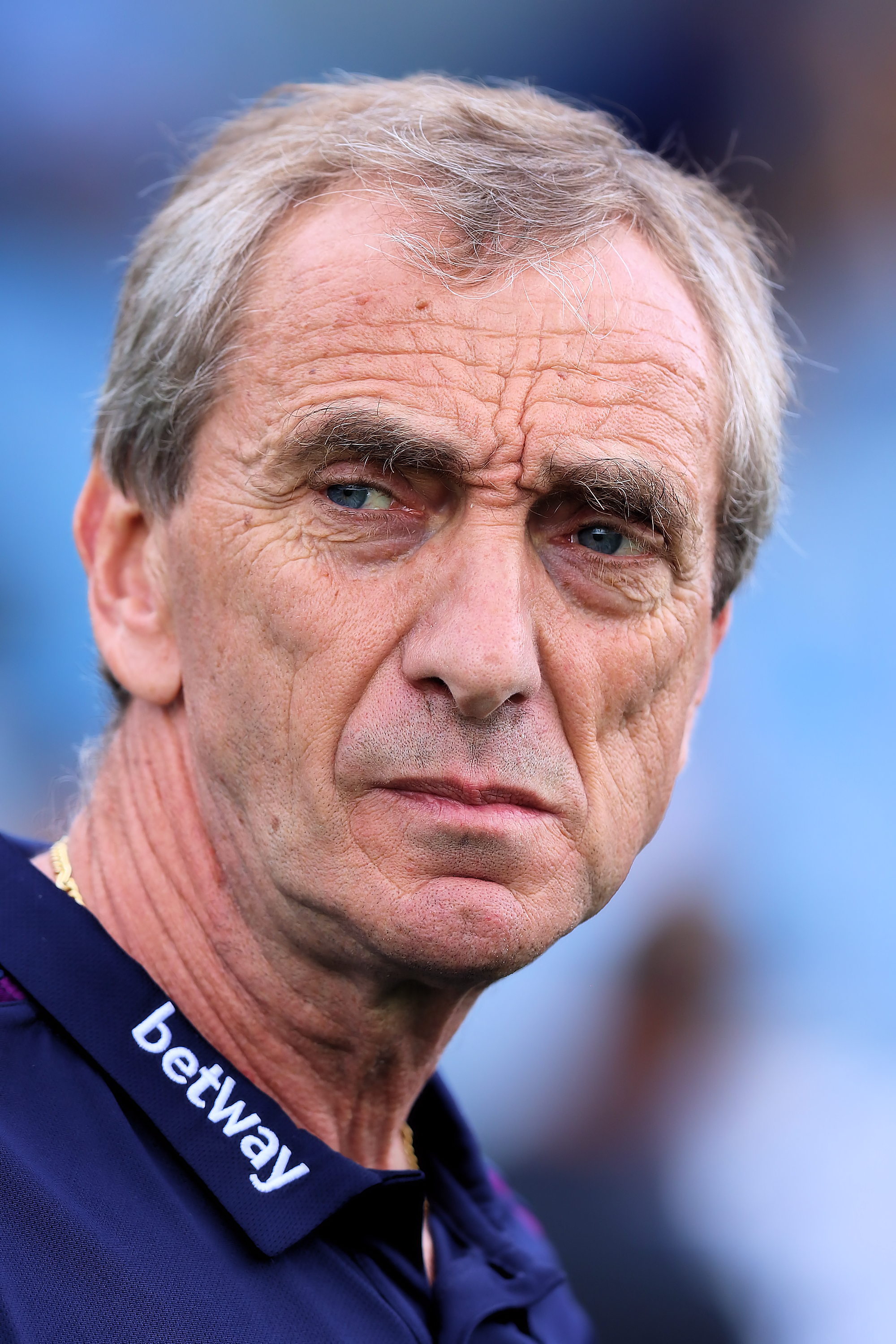
- Cousillas as assistant manager of West Ham United in 2019

Personal information
- Full name: Rubén Cousillas Fuse
- Date of birth: 19 May 1957 (age 69)
- Place of birth: Roque Pérez, Argentina
- Position: Goalkeeper

Youth career
- 1973–1977: San Lorenzo

Senior career*
Years	Team	Apps	(Gls)
1979	Almagro	30	(0)
1980–1987	San Lorenzo	118	(0)
1987–1988	Millonarios	53	(0)
1988–1991	Deportivo Mandiyú	89	(0)
1991	Vélez Sarsfield	4	(0)
1992	Deportivo Morón	22	(0)
1992–1995	Argentinos Juniors	69	(0)
1995	Huachipato	18	(0)
1996	Sarmiento Roque Pérez	23	(0)
Total		426	(0)

Managerial career
- 1998–2002: San Lorenzo (assistant)
- 2002–2003: River Plate (assistant)
- 2004–2009: Villarreal (assistant)
- 2009–2010: Real Madrid (assistant)
- 2010–2013: Málaga (assistant)
- 2013–2016: Manchester City (co-assistant)
- 2016–2018: Hebei China Fortune (co-assistant)
- 2018–2019: West Ham United (co-assistant)
- 2020–: Betis (assistant)
- * Club domestic league appearances and goals

Rubén Cousillas Fuse (born 9 May 1957) is an Argentinian football assistant manager and former player, who is assistant manager at Betis to Manuel Pellegrini.

== Playing career ==
Cousillas started his career at San Lorenzo with whom he won promotion to Primera División del Fútbol Argentino in the year 1982. In addition, he also played for Millonarios in Bogotá, with which he won three Colombian titles. He also played for Vélez Sársfield, Deportivo Mandiyú and Argentinos Juniors as well as Huachipato, where he ended his playing career.

== Management and coaching career ==
Cousillas began his career as a coach for Talleres de Córdoba, before moving on to Argentinos Juniors, where he worked under Chiche Sosa.

In 1998, Cousillas returned to his former playing club San Lorenzo, to become assistant to Oscar Ruggeri. When Ruggeri was replaced by Manuel Pellegrini, Cousillas struck a great working partnership with the Chilean, and followed him to River Plate, Villarreal, Real Madrid and Málaga.

On 14 June 2013, it was announced that Cousillas would be joining Manuel Pellegrini at Manchester City as co-assistant, alongside Brian Kidd.

Cousillas took caretaker charge of Manchester City in their 2-1 UEFA Champions League defeat to Barcelona due to manager Manuel Pellegrini having a three match UEFA ban for criticizing the referee in the first leg.

When Pellegrini left Manchester City in June 2016 on the expiry of his contract, Cousillas also left along with the remainder of Pellegrini's staff (not including Brian Kidd).

In 2018, he joined Pellegrini as a coach at West Ham United, leaving in December 2019 when Pellegrini was sacked.
