= Manuel Indiano Azaustre =

Spanish politician (1970–2000)

Manuel Indiano Azaustre (Madrid, 1970 – Zumárraga, 2000) was a Spanish politician murdered at the hands of ETA on 29 August 2000.

== Biography ==
Manuel Indiano Azaustre was killed by ETA in Zumárraga on 29 August 2000. Born in Madrid, he had transferred to Zumárraga after studying electronics. He has been working for six months as an independent councillor in the City of Zumárraga, which was on the list of Basque People's party. After he became unemployed, he acquired a small business in Zumárraga, called Kokolo. He was married, his wife was pregnant with seven months when Manuel was killed. At the time of his murder, he was 29 years old.

=== Murder ===
Francisco Javier Macazaga Azurmendi decided together with two other members of ETA to assassinate the councilman Manuel Indiano Azaustre. The Councilman had decided to get rid of the bodyguard months before the attack. On 29 August 2000, about 10:30 a.m. Macazaga entered with another of his companions to Kokolo, the establishment of sweets, magazines and bread owned by Indiano, located in Guipuzcoa locality of Zumárraga. He tried to take refuge in the back room, being followed by the ETA members. The two individuals fired in unison against Manuel, who was shot more than 14 times. A client found him lying dead on the floor of the back of the business. He was transferred to the Regional Hospital of Zumárraga. He was attempted to reanimate without success and his death was certified one hour after the admission.

The First Section of the Criminal Chamber of the National Court issued a judgment on 16 November 2010, number 71/2010, in which they condemned Francisco Javier Macazaga Azurmendi to 31 1/2 years in prison. Thirty years for a terrorist offence with the result of death and one and a half year for a crime of illegal possession of weapons for terrorist purposes. He was sentenced to award compensation for 600,000 euros for the widow and daughter of the victim and 150,000 euros for the parents. Likewise, this resolution also establishes the convicted person's prohibition to return to Zumárraga or to the locality in which the victim's family resides during the 5-year stay.

The terrorist group ETA claimed responsibility for the murder through a communiqué sent to Gara newspaper on 22 September 2000. They claimed in the statement that Manuel Indiano "had been brought from Spain by the PP to fill out their list."

== Bibliography ==
- MERINO, A., CHAPA, A., Raíces de Libertad. pp. 189–199. FPEV (2011). ISBN 978-84-615-0648-4
- This article makes use of material translated from the corresponding article in the Spanish-language Wikipedia.
