= Xabier Mancisidor =

Spanish footballer and coach

Xabi Mancisidor
Personal information
- Full name: Xabier Mancisidor Macazaga
- Date of birth: 24 May 1970 (age 56)
- Place of birth: Pasaia, Spain
- Position: Goalkeeper

Youth career
- Alavés

Senior career*
Years	Team	Apps	(Gls)
- Alavés B
1993–1995	Alavés	12	(0)
1995–1998	Mallorca	9	(0)
Total		21	(0)
- * Club domestic league appearances and goals

Xabier Mancisidor Macazaga (born 24 May 1970), known simply as Xabier, is a Spanish professional football coach and former player who is Mexico's goalkeeping coach.

== Playing career ==
Xabier was born in Pasaia, Gipuzkoa, Basque Country. A goalkeeper during his playing days, he was a Alavés youth graduate and was promoted to the first team ahead of the 1993–94 campaign, in Segunda División B.

In 1995, despite being a backup option, Xabier signed for Segunda División side Mallorca. He made his professional debut on 3 September of that year, starting in a 2–0 away win against Osasuna.

Xabier achieved promotion with Mallorca in 1997, playing two matches during the season. In the subsequent La Liga campaign, he was only a third-choice, and after failing to appear in a single minute, he retired at the age of only 28.

== Coaching career ==
Immediately after retiring, Mancisidor joined Real Sociedad's backroom staff. Initially a goalkeeping coach of the youth setup, he was later promoted to the first team and spent eleven seasons at the club.

Mancisidor was appointed goalkeeping coach at Manuel Pellegrini's staff at Real Madrid on 2 June 2009. On 3 January 2011, he was named on Pellegrini's staff at Málaga, with the same role.

On 14 June 2013, Mancisidor again followed Pellegrini to Manchester City. After Pellegrini's dismissal as City boss, Mancisidor remained at the club for a further ten years under Pep Guardiola. Xabier left the club following the mutual departure of Guardiola in 2026.

In August 28, 2026, it was announced that Mancisidor would join Rafael Márquez's coaching staff for Mexico en route to the 2030 FIFA World Cup.
