= 2015–16 Manchester City F.C. season =

English football club season

Manchester City
2015–16 season
- Owner: City Football Group
- Chairman: Khaldoon Al Mubarak
- Manager: Manuel Pellegrini
- Stadium: Etihad Stadium
- Premier League: 4th
- FA Cup: Fifth round
- League Cup: Winners
- UEFA Champions League: Semi-finals
- Top goalscorer: League: Sergio Agüero (24); All: Sergio Agüero (29)
- Highest home attendance: (54,693 vs. Leicester City, 6 February 2016, Premier League)
- Lowest home attendance: (38,246 vs. Hull City, 1 December 2015, League Cup)
Home colours	Away colours	Third colours

The 2015–16 season was Manchester City Football Club's 114th season of competitive football, 87th season in the top flight of English football and 19th season in the Premier League. Along with the league, the club also competed in the UEFA Champions League, FA Cup and League Cup. The season covered the period from 1 July 2015 to 30 June 2016.

In Manuel Pellegrini's final season at City, the club achieved some prominent milestones. On 28 February 2016, the Blues won the League Cup after beating Liverpool on penalties in the final at Wembley. Although City ended up only fourth in the league (which still qualified them for the following season's Champions League) despite a strong start, the season witnessed Manchester City's most successful European campaign to date, with the Blues defeating PSG 3–2 on aggregate to advance to the Champions League semi-finals for the first time in their history (they had never reached even the quarter-finals before). There, City were narrowly beaten by eventual champions Real Madrid 0–1 on aggregate.

== Kits ==
Supplier: Nike / Sponsor: Etihad Airways

Home	Home alt.	Away	Third	Third alt.	Goalkeeper 1	Goalkeeper 2	Goalkeeper 3

=== Kit information ===
The club entered the season being in the third year of a deal with the American manufacturer Nike.

- Home: The new home kit features the traditional colours of sky blue and white. The kit sees a return to white details, which were ditched last season in favour of navy applications. The shirt has a white polo neck collar and cuffs, along with a white stripe running from the bottom of the sleeves to the sides of the shirt. White shorts are returned to the kit, which is combined with sky blue socks with a white turnover.
- Away: The away kit is predominantly navy for the second season running, but this time the strip is combined with 'Chlorine Blue' detailing on the crew neck and the cuffs. The arms, however, feature a striking graphic of the Blue Moon, inspired by the song sung by the club's fans at the match days. The shirt is combined with navy shorts and socks.
- Third: The third kit is mainly a shade of chartreuse, known as 'ghost green', with black gradient graphic at the base of the sleeves and the bottom of the shorts. The yellowish green colour of the kit was inspired by the yellow and navy striped away kit worn by the club in the 1999 play-off final, when Manchester City overcame a two-goal deficit to take the game to extra time and eventually win on penalties. The kit is based on Nike's new premium template, which is also worn by other major clubs.
- Keeper: A new set of goalkeeper strips were released by Nike to be worn in the 2015–16 campaign. The first-choice strip is dark purple with lighter bluish line gradient on the arms, whilst the alternatives are yellow and green with a similar toned line gradient on the arms.

== Pre-season ==
Manchester City visited Australia during pre-season, where they played local clubs Adelaide United and Melbourne City before facing Roma and Real Madrid, runners-up in the Italian and Spanish leagues respectively, in the 2015 International Champions Cup tournament. They also played matches against Vietnam national team and German Bundesliga team VfB Stuttgart.

=== Friendlies ===
15 July 2015 Friendly	Adelaide United	0–2	Manchester City	Gold Coast, Australia
		Report	Barker 63'; Zuculini 84'	Stadium: Cbus Super Stadium; Attendance: 0 (Behind closed doors)

18 July 2015 Friendly	Melbourne City	0–1	Manchester City	Gold Coast, Australia
8:20 GMT		Report	Maffeo (yellow card) 42'; Nasri 86'	Stadium: Cbus Super Stadium; Referee: Strebre Delovski (Australia)

=== 2015 International Champions Cup ===
Pos	Team	Pld	W	OTW	OTL	L	GF	GA	GD	Pts	Final Result
1	(Spain) Real Madrid	2	1	0	1	0	4	1	+3	4	2015 ICC Australia
2	(Italy) Roma	2	0	1	1	0	2	2	0	3	
3	(England) Manchester City	2	0	1	0	1	3	6	−3	2	

Source: internationalchampionscup.com
Rules for classification: 1) points; 2) head-to-head result; 3) goal difference; 4) goals scored

21 July 2015 ICC	Roma	2–2 (4–5 p)	Manchester City	Melbourne, Australia
20:00 AEST	Pjanić 8'; Ljajić 87'	Report	Sterling 3'; Iheanacho 50'	Stadium: Melbourne Cricket Ground; Attendance: 41,134; Referee: Jarred Gillett (Australia)
	Penalties
	Nainggolan (penalty scored); Ljajić (penalty scored); Destro (penalty scored); Falque (penalty scored); Doumbia (penalty missed); Keita (penalty missed)		(penalty scored) Touré; (penalty missed) Kolarov; (penalty scored) Navas; (penalty scored) Lopes; (penalty scored) Hart; (penalty scored) Horsfield

24 July 2015 ICC	Manchester City	1–4	Real Madrid	Melbourne, Australia
20:00 AEST	Touré 45+4' (pen.)	Report	Benzema 21'; Ronaldo 25'; Pepe 44'; Cheryshev 72'	Stadium: Melbourne Cricket Ground; Attendance: 99,382; Referee: Hiroyuki Kimura (Japan)

=== Friendlies ===
27 July 2015 Friendly	Vietnam	1–8	Manchester City	Hanoi, Vietnam
14:00 BST	Nguyễn Xuân Thành (yellow card) 10'; Nguyễn Văn Quyết 90+1'	Report	Kolarov 11', 51' (pen.); Sterling 19', 31'; Silva 21', 65'; Lopes 73'; Pozo 78'	Stadium: Mỹ Đình National Stadium; Referee: Nagor Amir Noor Mohamed (Malaysia)

1 August 2015 Friendly	VfB Stuttgart	4–2	Manchester City	Stuttgart, Germany
	Kostić 15', (yellow card) 83'; Didavi 31'; Ginczek 36', 37'	Report	Iheanacho 84'; Džeko 89'	Stadium: Mercedes-Benz Arena; Attendance: 40,211

== Competitions ==
=== Overall ===
Competition	Started round	Final position / round	First match	Last match
Premier League	—	4th	10 August 2015	15 May 2016
FA Cup	Third round	Fifth round	9 January 2016	21 February 2016
League Cup	Third round	Winners	22 September 2015	28 February 2016
UEFA Champions League	Group stage	Semi-finals	15 September 2015	4 May 2016

Source: Competitions

=== Premier League ===
==== League table ====
Pos	Team	Pld	W	D	L	GF	GA	GD	Pts	Qualification or relegation
2	Arsenal	38	20	11	7	65	36	+29	71	Qualification for the Champions League group stage
3	Tottenham Hotspur	38	19	13	6	69	35	+34	70	Qualification for the Champions League group stage
4	Manchester City	38	19	9	10	71	41	+30	66	Qualification for the Champions League play-off round
5	Manchester United	38	19	9	10	49	35	+14	66	Qualification for the Europa League group stage (Note: Manchester United qualified for the Europa League group stage by winning the 2015–16 FA Cup. As they had also qualified by their virtue of their league position (5th), this spot was passed to the next-highest ranked team (6th), Southampton.)
6	Southampton	38	18	9	11	59	41	+18	63	Qualification for the Europa League group stage

Source: Barclays Premier League
Rules for classification: 1) Points; 2) Goal difference; 3) Goals scored; 4) Play-offs (only if needed to decide champion, teams for relegation or teams for UEFA competitions).

==== Results summary ====
Overall								Home						Away					
Pld	W	D	L	GF	GA	GD	Pts	W	D	L	GF	GA	GD	W	D	L	GF	GA	GD
38	19	9	10	71	41	+30	66	12	2	5	47	21	+26	7	7	5	24	20	+4

Last updated: 18 May 2016.
Source: Premier League

==== Results by matchday ====
Matchday	1	2	3	4	5	6	7	8	9	10	11	12	13	14	15	16	17	18	19	20	21	22	23	24	25	26	27	28	29	30	31	32	33	34	35	36	37	38
Ground	A	H	A	H	A	H	A	H	H	A	H	A	H	H	A	H	A	H	A	A	H	H	A	A	H	H	A	H	A	H	A	H	A	A	H	A	H	A
Result	W	W	W	W	W	L	L	W	W	D	W	D	L	W	L	W	L	W	D	W	D	W	D	W	L	L	L	W	D	L	W	W	W	D	W	L	D	D
Position	1	1	1	1	1	1	2	1	1	1	1	1	3	1	3	2	3	3	3	3	3	2	2	2	3	4	4	4	4	4	4	4	3	3	3	4	4	4

Updated to match(es) played on 18 May 2016. Source: Statto.com
A = Away; H = Home; W = Win; D = Draw; L = Loss

==== Matches ====
On 17 June 2015, the fixtures for the forthcoming season were announced.

10 August 2015 1	West Bromwich Albion	0–3	Manchester City	West Bromwich
20:00 BST	Fletcher (yellow card) 39'; Gardner (yellow card) 57'; Chester (yellow card) 58'; Yacob (yellow card) 62'	Report	Silva 9'; Touré 24'; Fernandinho (yellow card) 51'; Kompany 59'	Stadium: The Hawthorns; Attendance: 24,564; Referee: Mike Dean

16 August 2015 2	Manchester City	3–0	Chelsea	Manchester
16:00 BST	Agüero 31'; Kompany (yellow card) 33', (goal) 79'; Fernandinho (yellow card) 45+1', (goal) 85'; Touré (yellow card) 51'; Mangala (yellow card) 90+1'	Report	Ivanović (yellow card) 48'; Hazard (yellow card) 81'	Stadium: City of Manchester Stadium; Attendance: 54,331; Referee: Martin Atkinson

23 August 2015 3	Everton	0–2	Manchester City	Liverpool
16:00 BST		Report	Mangala (yellow card) 42'; Fernandinho (yellow card) 45+3'; Kolarov 60'; Nasri (yellow card) 86', (goal) 88'	Stadium: Goodison Park; Attendance: 38,352; Referee: Anthony Taylor

29 August 2015 4	Manchester City	2–0	Watford	Manchester
15:00 BST	Kompany (yellow card) 40'; Sterling 47'; Fernandinho 56'	Report	Nyom (yellow card) 43'; Prödl (yellow card) 63'	Stadium: City of Manchester Stadium; Attendance: 53,218; Referee: Mark Clattenburg

12 September 2015 5	Crystal Palace	0–1	Manchester City	Selhurst
15:00 BST	Dann (yellow card) 18'; Hangeland (yellow card) 71'	Report	Touré (yellow card) 25'; Nasri (yellow card) 69'; Mangala (yellow card) 81'; Iheanacho 90'	Stadium: Selhurst Park; Attendance: 25,167; Referee: Mike Jones

19 September 2015 6	Manchester City	1–2	West Ham United	Manchester
17:30 BST	De Bruyne 45+2'; Kolarov (yellow card) 54'	Report	Moses 6'; Lanzini (yellow card) 22'; Sakho 31'; Obiang (yellow card) 45+5'	Stadium: City of Manchester Stadium; Attendance: 53,545; Referee: Robert Madley

26 September 2015 7	Tottenham Hotspur	4–1	Manchester City	London
12:45 BST	Dier 45', (yellow card) 59'; Alderweireld 50'; Lamela (yellow card) 56', (goal) 79'; Kane 61', (yellow card) 90+4'; Eriksen (yellow card) 65'; Alli (yellow card) 88'	Report	De Bruyne 25'; Demichelis (yellow card) 45+2'	Stadium: White Hart Lane; Attendance: 35,867; Referee: Mark Clattenburg

3 October 2015 8	Manchester City	6–1	Newcastle United	Manchester
15:00 BST	Agüero 42', 49', 50', 60', 62'; Fernandinho (yellow card) 45+1'; De Bruyne 53'; Zabaleta (yellow card) 82'; Mangala (yellow card) 88'	Report	Mitrović 18'; Anita (yellow card) 32'	Stadium: City of Manchester Stadium; Attendance: 53,850; Referee: Kevin Friend

17 October 2015 9	Manchester City	5–1	Bournemouth	Manchester
15:00 BST	Sterling 7', 29', 45+2'; Bony 11', 89'; Sagna (yellow card) 26'; Otamendi (yellow card) 42'	Report	Murray 22'; Ritchie (yellow card) 87'	Stadium: City of Manchester Stadium; Attendance: 54,502; Referee: Mike Dean

25 October 2015 10	Manchester United	0–0	Manchester City	Manchester
14:05 GMT	Mata (yellow card) 39'; Schneiderlin (yellow card) 89'	Report	Fernandinho (yellow card) 15'; Kompany (yellow card) 45'	Stadium: Old Trafford; Attendance: 75,329; Referee: Mark Clattenburg

31 October 2015 11	Manchester City	2–1	Norwich City	Manchester
15:00 GMT	De Bruyne (yellow card) 34'; Otamendi 67'; Touré 89' (pen.); Fernando (yellow card) 90+3'	Report	Jerome (yellow card) 76', (goal) 83'; Martin (red card) 88'; Tettey (yellow card) 90'	Stadium: City of Manchester Stadium; Attendance: 53,418; Referee: Robert Madley

8 November 2015 12	Aston Villa	0–0	Manchester City	Birmingham
13:30 GMT	Guzan (yellow card) 90+2'	Report	Otamendi (yellow card) 39'	Stadium: Villa Park; Attendance: 36,757; Referee: Craig Pawson

21 November 2015 13	Manchester City	1–4	Liverpool	Manchester
17:30 GMT	Agüero 44'	Report	Mangala 7' (o.g.); Coutinho 23'; Roberto Firmino 32'; Lucas (yellow card) 38'; Can (yellow card) 47'; Škrtel 81'; Clyne (yellow card) 85'	Stadium: City of Manchester Stadium; Attendance: 54,444; Referee: Jonathan Moss

28 November 2015 14	Manchester City	3–1	Southampton	Manchester
15:00 GMT	De Bruyne 9'; Delph 20'; Demichelis (yellow card) 56'; Kolarov 69', (yellow card) 90+1'	Report	Long 49'; Ward-Prowse (yellow card) 55'	Stadium: City of Manchester Stadium; Attendance: 54,102; Referee: Roger East

5 December 2015 15	Stoke City	2–0	Manchester City	Stoke-on-Trent
12:45 GMT	Arnautović 7', 15'	Report	Otamendi (yellow card) 51'	Stadium: Britannia Stadium; Attendance: 27,264; Referee: Martin Atkinson

12 December 2015 16	Manchester City	2–1	Swansea City	Manchester
15:00 GMT	Bony 28', (yellow card) 58'; Sagna (yellow card) 60'; Mangala (yellow card) 77'; Iheanacho 90+2'	Report	Taylor (yellow card) 43'; Gomis 90'	Stadium: City of Manchester Stadium; Attendance: 53,052; Referee: Robert Madley

21 December 2015 17	Arsenal	2–1	Manchester City	London
20:00 GMT	Walcott 33'; Giroud 45+1'	Report	Silva (yellow card) 31'; Otamendi (yellow card) 48'; Touré 82'	Stadium: Emirates Stadium; Attendance: 60,053; Referee: Andre Marriner

26 December 2015 18	Manchester City	4–1	Sunderland	Manchester
15:00 GMT	Sterling (yellow card) 4', (goal) 12'; Touré 17'; Bony 22'; De Bruyne 54'	Report	Jones (yellow card) 36'; Borini 59'	Stadium: City of Manchester Stadium; Attendance: 54,523; Referee: Anthony Taylor

29 December 2015 19	Leicester City	0–0	Manchester City	Leicester
19:45 GMT	Albrighton (yellow card) 81'	Report	Kolarov (yellow card) 66'; Mangala (yellow card) 76'; De Bruyne (yellow card) 90'	Stadium: King Power Stadium; Attendance: 32,072; Referee: Craig Pawson

2 January 2016 20	Watford	1–2	Manchester City	Watford
17:30 GMT	Nyom (yellow card) 38'; Kolarov 55' (o.g.)	Report	Touré 82'; Agüero 84'	Stadium: Vicarage Road; Attendance: 20,676; Referee: Martin Atkinson

13 January 2016 21	Manchester City	0–0	Everton	Manchester
19:45 GMT		Report	Bešić (yellow card) 50'	Stadium: City of Manchester Stadium; Attendance: 53,796; Referee: Roger East

16 January 2016 22	Manchester City	4–0	Crystal Palace	Manchester
15:00 GMT	Delph 22'; Agüero 41', 68'; Silva 84'	Report	Chamakh (yellow card) 71'; Cabaye (yellow card) 90'	Stadium: City of Manchester Stadium; Attendance: 53,983; Referee: Jonathan Moss

23 January 2016 23	West Ham United	2–2	Manchester City	London
17:30 GMT	Valencia 1', 56'; Noble (yellow card) 39'; Byram (yellow card) 70'	Report	Agüero 9' (pen.), 81'; Demichelis (yellow card) 32'; Touré (yellow card) 89'; Fernando (yellow card) 90+4'	Stadium: Boleyn Ground; Attendance: 34,977; Referee: Craig Pawson

2 February 2016 24	Sunderland	0–1	Manchester City	Sunderland
19:45 GMT	Jones (yellow card) 59'	Report	Agüero 16', (yellow card) 90+1'; Otamendi (yellow card) 80'; Fernandinho (yellow card) 90+4'; Sagna (yellow card) 90+5'	Stadium: Stadium of Light; Attendance: 38,852; Referee: Stuart Attwell

6 February 2016 25	Manchester City	1–3	Leicester City	Manchester
12:45 GMT	Zabaleta (yellow card) 69'; Fernando (yellow card) 72'; Agüero 87'	Report	Huth 3', 60'; Morgan (yellow card) 36'; Simpson (yellow card) 46'; Mahrez 48'	Stadium: City of Manchester Stadium; Attendance: 54,693; Referee: Anthony Taylor

14 February 2016 26	Manchester City	1–2	Tottenham Hotspur	Manchester
16:15 GMT	Kompany (yellow card) 46'; Iheanacho 74'	Report	Dier (yellow card) 45+1'; Kane 53' (pen.); Wimmer (yellow card) 56'; Carroll (yellow card) 76'; Eriksen 83'	Stadium: City of Manchester Stadium; Attendance: 54,551; Referee: Mark Clattenburg

2 March 2016 27	Liverpool	3–0	Manchester City	Liverpool
20:00 GMT	Lallana 34'; Milner 41'; Roberto Firmino 57'	Report	Navas (yellow card) 68'	Stadium: Anfield; Attendance: 43,597; Referee: Martin Atkinson

5 March 2016 28	Manchester City	4–0	Aston Villa	Manchester
15:00 GMT	Touré 48'; Agüero 50', 60'; Sterling 66'	Report	Veretout (yellow card) 15'	Stadium: City of Manchester Stadium; Attendance: 53,892; Referee: Lee Mason

12 March 2016 29	Norwich City	0–0	Manchester City	Norwich
12:45 GMT	Bennett (yellow card) 12'; O'Neil (yellow card) 50'; Howson (yellow card) 74'	Report	Otamendi (yellow card) 26'	Stadium: Carrow Road; Attendance: 26,323; Referee: Jonathan Moss

20 March 2016 30	Manchester City	0–1	Manchester United	Manchester
16:00 GMT	Mangala (yellow card) 76'	Report	Smalling (yellow card) 10'; Rashford 16'	Stadium: City of Manchester Stadium; Attendance: 54,557; Referee: Michael Oliver

2 April 2016 31	Bournemouth	0–4	Manchester City	Bournemouth
15:00 BST		Report	Fernando 7'; De Bruyne 12'; Agüero 19'; Kolarov 90+3'	Stadium: Dean Court; Attendance: 11,192; Referee: Robert Madley

9 April 2016 32	Manchester City	2–1	West Bromwich Albion	Manchester
17:30 BST	Agüero 19' (pen.); Nasri 66'	Report	Sessègnon 6'; Gardner (yellow card) 33'	Stadium: City of Manchester Stadium; Attendance: 53,920; Referee: Mike Jones

16 April 2016 33	Chelsea	0–3	Manchester City	London
17:30 BST	Azpilicueta (yellow card) 62'; Mikel (yellow card) 72'; Courtois (red card) 78'	Report	Agüero 33', 54', 80'; Zabaleta (yellow card) 29'; Otamendi (yellow card) 45+1'; Nasri (yellow card) 47'	Stadium: Stamford Bridge; Attendance: 41,212; Referee: Mike Dean

19 April 2016 34	Newcastle United	1–1	Manchester City	Newcastle upon Tyne
19:45 BST	Anita 31', (yellow card) 43'; Pérez (yellow card) 56'; Sissoko (yellow card) 90+5'	Report	Agüero 14'; Kompany (yellow card) 67'; Mangala (yellow card) 89'	Stadium: St. James' Park; Attendance: 46,424; Referee: Kevin Friend

23 April 2016 35	Manchester City	4–0	Stoke City	Manchester
12:45 BST	Fernando 35'; Agüero 43' (pen.); Iheanacho 64', 74'	Report		Stadium: City of Manchester Stadium; Attendance: 53,974; Referee: Bobby Madley

1 May 2016 36	Southampton	4–2	Manchester City	Southampton
16:30 BST	Long 25'; Mané 28', 57', 68'; Clasie (yellow card) 30'; Tadić (yellow card) 54'	Report	Fernandinho (yellow card) 20'; Iheanacho 44', 78'	Stadium: St Mary's Stadium; Attendance: 31,472; Referee: Andre Marriner

8 May 2016 37	Manchester City	2–2	Arsenal	Manchester
16:00 BST	Agüero 8'; De Bruyne 51'; Otamendi (yellow card) 90+1'; Fernandinho (yellow card) 90+2'	Report	Giroud 10'; Sánchez 68'; Gabriel (yellow card) 71'	Stadium: City of Manchester Stadium; Attendance: 54,425; Referee: Anthony Taylor

15 May 2016 38	Swansea City	1–1	Manchester City	Swansea
15:00 BST	Ayew 45+1'; Britton (yellow card) 74'	Report	Iheanacho 5', (yellow card) 41'; Otamendi (yellow card) 45'; Sagna (yellow card) 67'	Stadium: Liberty Stadium; Attendance: 20,934; Referee: Mike Dean

=== FA Cup ===
Win Draw Loss Postponed

9 January 2016 Third round	Norwich City	0–3	Manchester City	Norwich
15:00 GMT	Martin (yellow card) 48'; Dorrans (yellow card) 84'	Report	Agüero 16'; Iheanacho 31'; De Bruyne 78'	Stadium: Carrow Road; Attendance: 24,507; Referee: Mike Dean

30 January 2016 Fourth round	Aston Villa	0–4	Manchester City	Birmingham
15:00 GMT	Bacuna (yellow card) 27'; Westwood (yellow card) 45+2'	Report	Iheanacho 4', 24' (pen.), 74'; Sterling (yellow card) 27', (goal) 76'; Zabaleta (yellow card) 69'	Stadium: Villa Park; Attendance: 23,636; Referee: Mike Jones

21 February 2016 Fifth round	Chelsea	5–1	Manchester City	London
16:00 GMT	Costa 35'; Willian 48'; Cahill 53'; Hazard 67'; Traoré 89'	Report	Faupala 37'; Demichelis (yellow card) 65'	Stadium: Stamford Bridge; Attendance: 41,594; Referee: Andre Marriner

=== League Cup ===
22 September 2015 Third round	Sunderland	1–4	Manchester City	Sunderland
19:45 BST (UTC+01:00)	Rodwell (yellow card) 15'; Coates (yellow card) 45+1'; Toivonen 83'	Report	Agüero 9' (pen.); De Bruyne 25'; Mannone 33' (o.g.); Sterling 36'; Demichelis (yellow card) 57'	Stadium: Stadium of Light; Attendance: 21,644; Referee: Roger East

28 October 2015 Fourth round	Manchester City	5–1	Crystal Palace	Manchester
19:45 GMT (UTC+00:00)	Bony 22'; De Bruyne 44'; Kolarov (yellow card) 50'; Iheanacho 59'; Touré 76' (pen.); M. García 90+4'	Report	Zaha (yellow card) 80'; Delaney 89'	Stadium: City of Manchester Stadium; Attendance: 40,585; Referee: Paul Tierney

1 December 2015 Fifth round	Manchester City	4–1	Hull City	Manchester
19:45 GMT	Bony 12'; Mangala (yellow card) 42'; Iheanacho 80'; De Bruyne 82', 87'	Report	Maguire (yellow card) 75'; Robertson 90+3'	Stadium: City of Manchester Stadium; Attendance: 38,246; Referee: Neil Swarbrick

6 January 2016 Semi-finals First leg	Everton	2–1	Manchester City	Liverpool
20:00 GMT	Funes Mori 45+1'; Lukaku 78'	Report	Delph (yellow card) 51'; Navas 76'	Stadium: Goodison Park; Attendance: 34,027; Referee: Robert Madley

27 January 2016 Semi-finals Second leg	Manchester City	3–1 (4–3 agg.)	Everton	Manchester
19:45 GMT	Fernandinho 24'; De Bruyne 70'; Agüero 76'; Otamendi (yellow card) 85'	Report	Barkley 18'; Cleverley (yellow card) 84'; Baines (yellow card) 89'	Stadium: City of Manchester Stadium; Attendance: 50,048; Referee: Martin Atkinson

28 February 2016 Final	Liverpool	1–1 (a.e.t.) (1–3 p)	Manchester City	London
16:30 GMT	Clyne (yellow card) 53'; Moreno (yellow card) 65'; Coutinho 83', (yellow card) 84'; Can (yellow card) 85'; Lallana (yellow card) 118'	Report	Fernandinho 49', (yellow card) 119'; Kompany (yellow card) 87'; Otamendi (yellow card) 109'; Touré (yellow card) 118'	Stadium: Wembley Stadium; Attendance: 86,206; Referee: Michael Oliver
	Penalties
	Can (penalty scored); Lucas (penalty missed); Coutinho (penalty missed); Lallana (penalty missed)		(penalty missed) Fernandinho; (penalty scored) Navas; (penalty scored) Agüero; (penalty scored) Touré

=== UEFA Champions League ===
==== Group stage ====
The group stage draw was conducted on 27 August 2015 in Monaco, with City being paired with Juventus, Sevilla and Borussia Mönchengladbach.

Pos	Team	Pld	W	D	L	GF	GA	GD	Pts	Qualification	MCI	JUV	SEV	BMG
1	(England) Manchester City	6	4	0	2	12	8	+4	12	Advance to knockout phase	—	1–2	2–1	4–2
2	(Italy) Juventus	6	3	2	1	6	3	+3	11	Advance to knockout phase	1–0	—	2–0	0–0
3	(Spain) Sevilla	6	2	0	4	8	11	−3	6	Transfer to Europa League	1–3	1–0	—	3–0
4	(Germany) Borussia Mönchengladbach	6	1	2	3	8	12	−4	5		1–2	1–1	4–2	—

Source: UEFA
Rules for classification: Group stage tiebreakers

15 September 2015 1	Manchester City (England)	1–2	(Italy) Juventus	Manchester, England
20:45 CEST (UTC+02:00)	Chiellini 57' (o.g.)	Report	Mandžukić 70'; Morata 81'	Stadium: City of Manchester Stadium; Attendance: 50,363; Referee: Damir Skomina (Slovenia)

30 September 2015 2	Borussia Mönchengladbach (Germany)	1–2	(England) Manchester City	Mönchengladbach, Germany
20:45 CEST (UTC+02:00)	Stindl (yellow card) 37', (goal) 54'; Korb (yellow card) 67'; Domínguez (yellow card) 87'	Report	Otamendi (yellow card) 18'; Demichelis 65'; Agüero 90' (pen.)	Stadium: Borussia-Park; Attendance: 46,217; Referee: Clément Turpin (France)

21 October 2015 3	Manchester City (England)	2–1	(Spain) Sevilla	Manchester, England
20:45 CEST (UTC+02:00)	Rami 36' (o.g.); Bony (yellow card) 47'; De Bruyne 90+1'	Report	Konoplyanka 30'; Iborra (yellow card) 62'; Gameiro (yellow card) 69'	Stadium: City of Manchester Stadium; Attendance: 45,595; Referee: Bas Nijhuis (Netherlands)

3 November 2015 4	Sevilla (Spain)	1–3	(England) Manchester City	Seville, Spain
20:45 CET (UTC+01:00)	Trémoulinas 25'; Krychowiak (yellow card) 43'	Report	Sterling 8'; Fernandinho 11'; Bony 36'	Stadium: Ramón Sánchez Pizjuán; Attendance: 39,261; Referee: Svein Oddvar Moen (Norway)

25 November 2015 5	Juventus (Italy)	1–0	(England) Manchester City	Turin, Italy
20:45 CET (UTC+01:00)	Mandžukić 18'	Report	Fernandinho (yellow card) 35'; Navas (yellow card) 69'; Sagna (yellow card) 69'	Stadium: Juventus Stadium; Attendance: 38,193; Referee: Felix Brych (Germany)

8 December 2015 6	Manchester City (England)	4–2	(Germany) Borussia Mönchengladbach	Manchester, England
20:45 CET (UTC+01:00)	Silva 16'; Sterling 79', 81'; Bony 85'	Report	Korb 19'; Raffael 42'	Stadium: City of Manchester Stadium; Attendance: 41,829; Referee: Danny Makkelie (Netherlands)

==== Round of 16 ====
24 February 2016 First leg	Dynamo Kyiv (Ukraine)	1–3	(England) Manchester City	Kyiv, Ukraine
20:45 CET (UTC+01:00)	Buyalskyi 59'	Report	Agüero 15'; Silva 40'; Touré 90'	Stadium: Olympic Stadium; Attendance: 53,691; Referee: Antonio Mateu Lahoz (Spain)

15 March 2016 Second leg	Manchester City (England)	0–0 (3–1 agg.)	(Ukraine) Dynamo Kyiv	Manchester, England
20:45 CET (UTC+01:00)	Otamendi (yellow card) 18'	Report	Antunes (yellow card) 21'; Harmash (yellow card) 57'	Stadium: City of Manchester Stadium; Attendance: 43,630; Referee: Ovidiu Hategan

==== Quarter-finals ====
6 April 2016 First leg	Paris Saint-Germain (France)	2–2	(England) Manchester City	Paris, France
20:45 CSET (UTC+02:00)	David Luiz (yellow card) 1'; Ibrahimović (penalty missed) 14', 41'; Matuidi (yellow card) 48'; Rabiot 59'	Report	Clichy (yellow card) 11'; Fernando (yellow card) 35'; De Bruyne 38'; Fernandinho 72'; Mangala (yellow card) 83'; Navas (yellow card) 85'	Stadium: Parc de Princes; Attendance: 47,228; Referee: Milorad Mažić

12 April 2016 Second leg	Manchester City (England)	1–0 (3–2 agg.)	(France) Paris Saint-Germain	Manchester, England
20:45 CEST (UTC+02:00)	Agüero (penalty missed) 30'; Fernandinho (yellow card) 72'; De Bruyne 76'	Report	Trapp (yellow card) 29'; Pastore (yellow card) 67'; Van der Wiel (yellow card) 68'	Stadium: City of Manchester Stadium; Attendance: 53,039; Referee: Carlos Velasco Carballo

==== Semi-finals ====
26 April 2016 First leg	Manchester City (England)	0–0	(Spain) Real Madrid	Manchester, England
20:45 CEST (UTC+02:00)	Silva (yellow card) 37'	Report	Pepe (yellow card) 24'; Carvajal (yellow card) 90+2'	Stadium: City of Manchester Stadium; Attendance: 52,221; Referee: Cüneyt Çakır

4 May 2016 Second leg	Real Madrid (Spain)	1–0 (1–0 agg.)	(England) Manchester City	Madrid, Spain
20:45 CEST (UTC+02:00)	Fernando 20' (o.g.); Vázquez (yellow card) 83'	Report	De Bruyne (yellow card) 30'; Fernando (yellow card) 71'; Otamendi (yellow card) 90+4'	Stadium: Santiago Bernabéu; Attendance: 78,300; Referee: Damir Skomina

== Squad information ==
=== First team squad ===
N	Pos.	Nat.	Name	Age	EU	Since	App	Goals	Ends	Transfer fee	Notes
1	GK	(England)	Joe Hart	29	EU	2006	347	0	2019	£100,000	
3	RB	(France)	Bacary Sagna	33	EU	2014	61	0	2017	Free	
4	CB	(Belgium)	Vincent Kompany	30	EU	2008	298	14	2019	£6M	Captain
5	RB	(Argentina)	Pablo Zabaleta	31	EU	2008	301	10	2017	£6M	
6	DM	(Brazil)	Fernando	28	EU	2014	75	4	2019	£12M	
7	RW	(England)	Raheem Sterling	21	EU	2015	47	11	2020	£49M	
8	AM	(France)	Samir Nasri	29	EU	2011	176	27	2019	£25M	
10	FW	(Argentina)	Sergio Agüero	28	EU	2011	208	136	2019	£35M	
11	LB	(Serbia)	Aleksandar Kolarov	30	Non-EU	2010	206	20	2018	£16M	
13	GK	(Argentina)	Willy Caballero	34	EU	2014	21	0	2017	£4.4M	
14	FW	(Ivory Coast)	Wilfried Bony	27	Non-EU	2015 (Winter)	46	10	2019	£30M	
15	RW	(Spain)	Jesús Navas	30	EU	2013	147	8	2017	£14.9M	
17	AM	(Belgium)	Kevin De Bruyne	25	EU	2015	41	16	2021	£54.5M	
18	CM	(England)	Fabian Delph	26	EU	2015	27	2	2020	£8M	
20	CB	(France)	Eliaquim Mangala	25	EU	2014	63	0	2019	£32M	
21	AM	(Spain)	David Silva	30	EU	2010	260	43	2019	£24M	
22	LB	(France)	Gaël Clichy	30	EU	2011	164	1	2017	£7M	
25	CM	(Brazil)	Fernandinho	31	Non-EU	2013	139	14	2017	£30M	
26	CB	(Argentina)	Martín Demichelis	35	EU	2013	106	4	2016	£4M	
27	MF	(England)	Patrick Roberts	19	EU	2015	3	0	2020	£2M	On loan at Celtic
28	DF	(Belgium)	Jason Denayer	21	EU	2014	0	0	2020	£193,000	Academy Graduate; On loan at Galatasaray
29	GK	(England)	Richard Wright	38	EU	2012	0	0	2016	Free	
30	DF	(Argentina)	Nicolás Otamendi	28	EU	2015	49	1	2020	£33M	
36	CM	(Argentina)	Bruno Zuculini	23	EU	2014	1	0	N/A	£1.5M	On loan at AEK Athens
42	CM	(Ivory Coast)	Yaya Touré	33	Non-EU	2010	267	76	2017	£24M	
72	FW	(Nigeria)	Kelechi Iheanacho	19	Non-EU	2015	35	14	2019	£360,000	Academy Graduate

Updated to match played 15 May 2016
Source: mcfc.co.uk
Ordered by squad number.
Appearances include all competitive league and cup appearances, including as substitute.

=== Playing statistics ===
As of 15 May 2016

Appearances (Apps) numbers are for appearances in competitive games only, including as substitute.
Red card numbers denote: numbers in parentheses represent red cards overturned for wrongful dismissal.

No.	Nat.	Player	Pos.	Premier League				FA Cup				League Cup				Champions League				Total			
No.	Nat.	Player	Pos.	Apps	Goal	Yellow card	Red card	Apps	Goal	Yellow card	Red card	Apps	Goal	Yellow card	Red card	Apps	Goal	Yellow card	Red card	Apps	Goal	Yellow card	Red card
1	(England)	Joe Hart	GK	35												12				47			
3	(France)	Bacary Sagna	DF	28		4		1				5				11		1		45		5	
4	(Belgium)	Vincent Kompany	DF	14	2	5						1		1		7				22	2	6	
5	(Argentina)	Pablo Zabaleta	DF	13		3		3		1		3				3				22		4	
6	(Brazil)	Fernando	MF	24	2	4		3				5		1		10		2		42	2	7	
7	(England)	Raheem Sterling	MF	31	6	1		2	1	1		4	1			10	3			47	11	2	
8	(France)	Samir Nasri	MF	12	2	3										1				13	2	3	
10	(Argentina)	Sergio Agüero	FW	30	24	1		1	1			4	2			9	2			44	29	1	
11	(Serbia)	Aleksandar Kolarov	DF	29	3	3		2				2		1		6				39	3	4	
13	(Argentina)	Willy Caballero	GK	4				3				6				1				14			
14	(Ivory Coast)	Wilfried Bony	FW	26	4	1						3	2			5	2	1		34	8	2	
15	(Spain)	Jesús Navas	MF	34		1		2				6	1			10		2		52	1	3	
17	(Belgium)	Kevin De Bruyne	MF	25	7	2		1	1			5	5			10	3	1		41	16	3	
18	(England)	Fabian Delph	MF	17	2			2				3		1		5				27	2	1	
20	(France)	Eliaquim Mangala	DF	23		8						3		1		7		1		33		10	
21	(Spain)	David Silva	MF	24	2	1						4				8	2	1		36	4	2	
22	(France)	Gaël Clichy	DF	14				2				4				8		1		28		1	
25	(Brazil)	Fernandinho	MF	33	2	8		1				5	2	1		11	2	2		50	6	11	
26	(Argentina)	Martín Demichelis	DF	20		3		2		1		5		1		4	1			31	1	5	
27	(England)	Patrick Roberts	MF	1								2								3			
30	(Argentina)	Nicolás Otamendi	DF	30	1	9		2				5		2		12		3		49	1	14	
42	(Ivory Coast)	Yaya Touré	MF	32	6	3						5	1	1		10	1			47	8	4	
51	(France)	David Faupala	FW					1	1											1	1		
53	(England)	Tosin Adarabioyo	DF					1												1			
59	(Kosovo)	Bersant Celina	MF	1				3												4			
62	(England)	Brandon Barker	MF					1												1			
69	(Spain)	Angeliño	DF					1												1			
70	(England)	George Evans	MF									1								1			
72	(Nigeria)	Kelechi Iheanacho	FW	26	8	1		3	4			2	2			4				35	14	1	
75	(Spain)	Aleix García	MF					1												1			
76	(Spain)	Manu García	MF	1				1				2	1							4	1		
77	(England)	Cameron Humphreys	DF					2												2			
Own goals					0				0				1				2				3		
Totals					71	61	0		8	3	0		18	10	0		18	15	0		115	89	0

Source: for players, positions and squad numbers: first team squad; for actual stats: squad profiles.

=== Goalscorers ===
Includes all competitive matches. The list is sorted alphabetically by surname when total goals are equal.

Correct as of 15 May 2016

No.	Nat.	Player	Pos.	Premier League	FA Cup	League Cup	Champions League	TOTAL
10	(Argentina)	Sergio Agüero	FW	24	1	2	2	29
17	(Belgium)	Kevin De Bruyne	MF	7	1	5	3	16
72	(Nigeria)	Kelechi Iheanacho	FW	8	4	2	0	14
7	(England)	Raheem Sterling	MF	6	1	1	3	11
14	(Ivory Coast)	Wilfried Bony	FW	4	0	2	2	8
42	(Ivory Coast)	Yaya Touré	MF	6	0	1	1	8
25	(Brazil)	Fernandinho	MF	2	0	2	2	6
21	(Spain)	David Silva	MF	2	0	0	2	4
11	(Serbia)	Aleksandar Kolarov	DF	3	0	0	0	3
4	(Belgium)	Vincent Kompany	DF	2	0	0	0	2
18	(England)	Fabian Delph	MF	2	0	0	0	2
8	(France)	Samir Nasri	MF	2	0	0	0	2
6	(Brazil)	Fernando	MF	2	0	0	0	2
26	(Argentina)	Martín Demichelis	DF	0	0	0	1	1
76	(Spain)	Manu García	MF	0	0	1	0	1
30	(Argentina)	Nicolás Otamendi	DF	1	0	0	0	1
15	(Spain)	Jesús Navas	MF	0	0	1	0	1
51	(France)	David Faupala	FW	0	1	0	0	1
Own goals				0	0	1	2	3
Totals				71	8	18	18	115

=== Hattricks ===
Includes all competitive matches. The list is sorted alphabetically by surname when total clean sheets are equal.

Correct as of 15 May 2016

Player	Against	Result	Date	Competitioln	Ref
(Argentina) Sergio Agüero	Newcastle United	6-1(H)^{5}	3 October 2015	Premier League	
(Argentina) Sergio Agüero	Chelsea	3-1(A)	16 April 2016	Premier League	
(Nigeria) Kelechi Iheanacho	Aston Villa	4-0(A)	30 January 2016	FA Cup	
(England) Raheem Sterling	Bournemouth	5-1(H)	17 October 2015	Premier League	

^{5}-Player scored five goals

=== Clean sheets ===
Includes all competitive matches. The list is sorted alphabetically by surname when total clean sheets are equal.

Correct as of 15 May 2016

No.	Nat.	Player	Matches Played	Clean Sheet %	Premier League	PL %	FA Cup	FA %	League Cup	LA %	Champions League	%
1	(England)	Joe Hart	29	38%	23	48%	0	0%	0	0%	6	0%
13	(Argentina)	Willy Caballero	11	22%	2	0%	3	100%	6	0%	0	0%
29	(England)	Richard Wright	0	0%	0	0%	0	0%	0	0%	0	0%
Totals			38	34%	25	44%	2	100%	5	0%	6	0%

== Awards ==
=== Premier League Manager of the Month award ===
Awarded monthly to the manager who was chosen by a panel assembled by the Premier League's sponsor.

Month	Manager
August	(Chile) Manuel Pellegrini

=== Premier League Player of the Month award ===
Awarded monthly to the player who was chosen by a panel assembled by the Premier League's sponsor.

Month	Player
January	(Argentina) Sergio Agüero
April	(Argentina) Sergio Agüero

=== Etihad Player of the Month awards ===
Awarded to the player that receives the most votes in a poll conducted each month on the official website of Manchester City.

Month	Player
August	(Spain) David Silva
September	(Belgium) Kevin De Bruyne
October	(Belgium) Kevin De Bruyne
November	(Brazil) Fernandinho
December	(Belgium) Kevin De Bruyne
January	(Argentina) Sergio Agüero
February	(Belgium) Vincent Kompany
March	(France) Gaël Clichy
April	(Belgium) Kevin De Bruyne

== Transfers and loans ==
=== Transfers in ===
First Team
Date	Position	No.	Player	From club	Transfer fee
14 July 2015	MF	7	(England) Raheem Sterling	(England) Liverpool	£44,000,000
17 July 2015	MF	18	(England) Fabian Delph	(England) Aston Villa	£8,000,000
19 July 2015	MF	27	(England) Patrick Roberts	(England) Fulham	£12,000,000
20 August 2015	DF	30	(Argentina) Nicolás Otamendi	(Spain) Valencia	£28,400,000
30 August 2015	MF	17	(Belgium) Kevin De Bruyne	(Germany) VfL Wolfsburg	£55,000,000
26 October 2015	MF	–	(Australia) Luke Brattan	Unattached	Free
15 January 2016	MF	–	(Australia) Anthony Cáceres	(Australia) Central Coast Mariners	£200,000

EDS, academy and other
Date	Position	No.	Player	From club	Transfer fee
6 July 2015	FW	83	(Turkey) Enes Ünal	(Turkey) Bursaspor	£2,000,000
10 July 2015	MF	—	(France) David Faupala	(France) Lens	Free
27 August 2015	FW	—	(Spain) Aleix García	(Spain) Villarreal	Undisclosed
28 August 2015	FW	—	(Spain) Rubén Sobrino	(Spain) Real Madrid / (Spain) Ponferradina	£400,000
28 August 2015	DF	—	(France) Florian Lejeune	(Spain) Girona	Undisclosed
29 August 2015	DF	—	(Spain) Erik Sarmiento	(Spain) Espanyol	Undisclosed

Total spending: ▼£150,000,000

=== Transfers out ===
First Team
Exit date	Position	No.	Player	To club	Transfer fee
1 July 2015	DF	38	(Belgium) Dedryck Boyata	(Scotland) Celtic	£1,700,000
1 July 2015	DF	33	(Serbia) Matija Nastasić	(Germany) Schalke 04	£8,300,000
1 July 2015	DF	2	(England) Micah Richards	(England) Aston Villa	Free
1 July 2015	MF	12	(England) Scott Sinclair	(England) Aston Villa	£3,000,000
1 July 2015	MF	18	(England) Frank Lampard	(United States) New York City FC	Free
1 July 2015	MF	7	(England) James Milner	(England) Liverpool	Free
1 July 2015	FW	9	(Spain) Álvaro Negredo	(Spain) Valencia	£22,000,000
1 July 2015	FW	60	(Sweden) John Guidetti	(Spain) Celta Vigo	Free
1 July 2015	DF	19	(Netherlands) Karim Rekik	(France) Marseille	£3,900,000
28 Aug 2015	MF	64	(Portugal) Marcos Lopes	(France) Monaco	£9,000,000

EDS and academy
Exit date	Position	No.	Player	To club	Transfer fee
1 July 2015	DF	51	(England) Adam Drury	(England) Bristol Rovers	Free
1 July 2015	DF	68	(England) Greg Leigh	(England) Bradford City	Free
1 July 2015	MF	—	(Ghana) Dominic Oduro	(Denmark) Nordsjælland	Free
1 July 2015	FW	—	(England) Joe Nuttall	(Scotland) Aberdeen	Free
1 July 2015	FW	—	(Norway) Martin Samuelsen	(England) West Ham United	Free
17 July 2015	FW	—	(England) Jordy Hiwula	(England) Huddersfield Town	Undisclosed
28 August 2015	FW	—	(England) Devante Cole	(England) Bradford City	Free
31 August 2015	FW	—	(Spain) José Ángel Pozo	(Spain) Almería	Undisclosed
19 Jan 2016	MF	70	(England) George Evans	(England) Reading	Undisclosed

Total earnings: ▲£47,900,000

=== Loans out ===
First Team
Start date	End date	Position	No.	Player	To club
30 June 2015	30 June 2016	MF	37	(Republic of Ireland) Jack Byrne	(Netherlands) Cambuur
31 July 2015	31 January 2017	FW	35	(Montenegro) Stevan Jovetić	(Italy) Internazionale
12 August 2015	30 June 2016	FW	—	(Bosnia and Herzegovina) Edin Džeko	(Italy) Roma
31 August 2015	30 June 2016	DF	28	(Belgium) Jason Denayer	(Turkey) Galatasaray
26 October 2015	21 December 2015	MF	–	(Australia) Luke Brattan	(England) Bolton Wanderers
26 October 2015	2 January 2016	MF	36	(Argentina) Bruno Zuculini	(England) Middlesbrough
15 January 2016	8 April 2016	MF	–	(Australia) Anthony Cáceres	(Australia) Melbourne City
30 January 2016	30 June 2017	MF	27	(England) Patrick Roberts	(Scotland) Celtic
1 February 2016	30 June 2016	MF	36	(Argentina) Bruno Zuculini	(Greece) AEK Athens

EDS, academy and other
Start date	End date	Position	No.	Player	To club
1 February 2015	30 June 2016	MF	—	(Ghana) Divine Naah	(Netherlands) NAC Breda
5 February 2015	30 June 2016	MF	—	(Ghana) Bismark Adjei-Boateng	(Norway) Strømsgodset
1 July 2015	30 June 2016	FW	—	(Ghana) Godsway Donyoh	(Sweden) Falkenbergs FF
1 July 2015	1 January 2016	DF	69	(Spain) Angeliño	(United States) New York City FC
1 July 2015	1 January 2016	DF	58	(England) Shay Facey	(United States) New York City FC
1 July 2015	30 June 2016	MF	37	(Republic of Ireland) Jack Byrne	(Netherlands) Cambuur
29 July 2015	30 June 2016	MF	66	(France) Seko Fofana	(France) Bastia
31 July 2015	30 June 2017	FW	83	(Turkey) Enes Ünal	(Belgium) Genk
31 July 2015	30 June 2016	FW	—	(Ghana) Thomas Agyepong	(Netherlands) Twente
31 July 2015	30 June 2017	MF	55	(France) Olivier Ntcham	(Italy) Genoa
18 August 2015	30 June 2016	FW	—	(Ghana) Yaw Yeboah	(France) Lille
28 August 2015	30 June 2016	FW	—	(Spain) Rubén Sobrino	(Spain) Girona
28 August 2015	30 June 2016	DF	—	(France) Florian Lejeune	(Spain) Girona
31 August 2015	30 June 2016	MF	—	(Nigeria) Chidiebere Nwakali	(Spain) Girona
28 September 2015	27 October 2015	MF	—	(England) James Horsfield	(England) Doncaster Rovers
28 September 2015	10 January 2016	MF	70	(England) George Evans	(England) Walsall
6 November 2015	15 December 2015	MF	62	(England) Brandon Barker	(England) Rotherham United
11 December 2015	11 January 2016	GK	45	(Republic of Ireland) Ian Lawlor	(England) Barnet
2 January 2016	30 June 2016	DF	58	(England) Shay Facey	(England) Rotherham United
13 January 2016	30 June 2016	DF	50	(Spain) Pablo Maffeo	(Spain) Girona
7 January 2016	30 June 2016	GK	45	(Republic of Ireland) Ian Lawlor	(England) Bury
1 February 2016	30 June 2016	FW	83	(Turkey) Enes Ünal	(Netherlands) NAC Breda
