= David Faupala =

French footballer (born 1997)

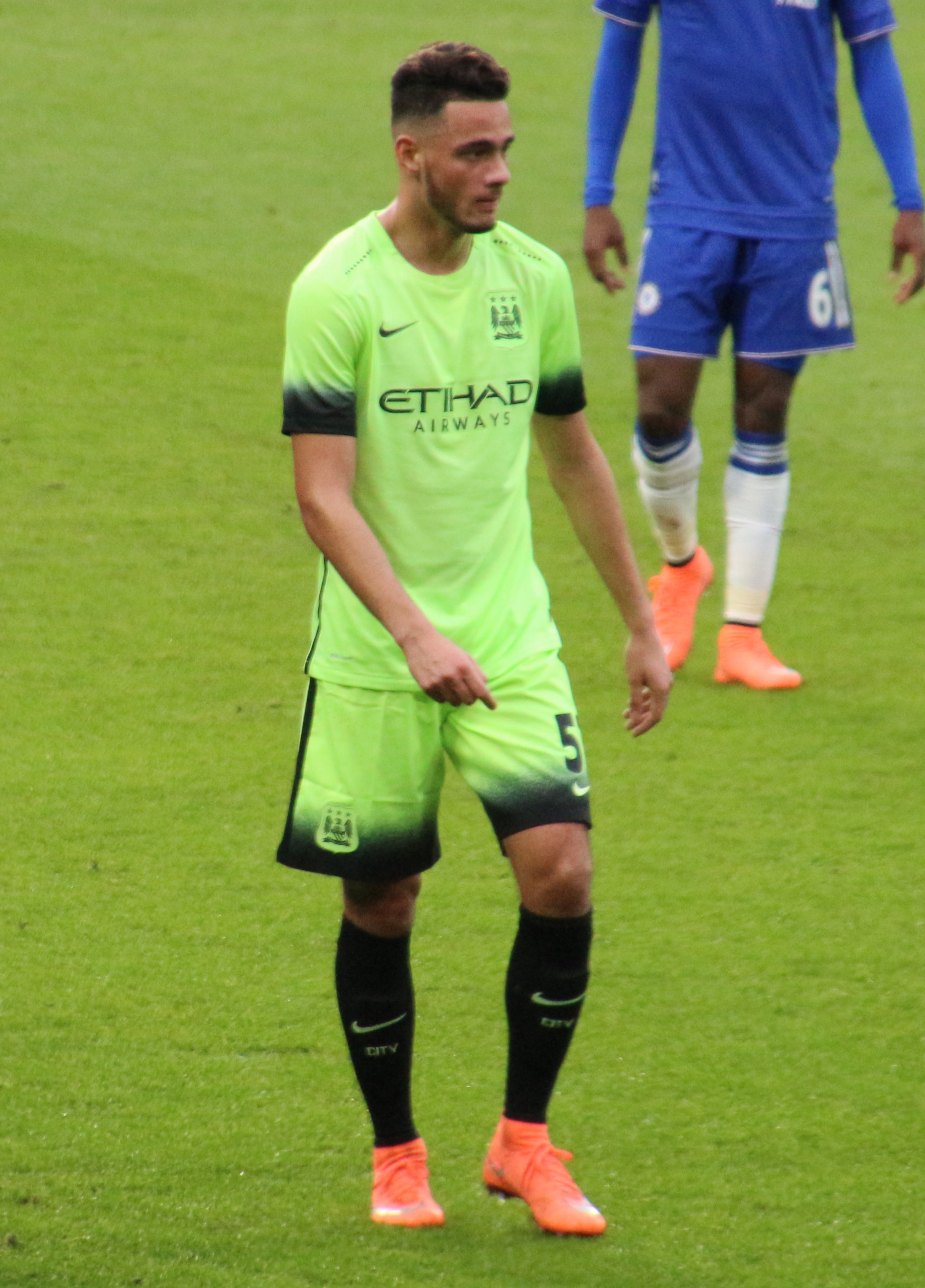
- Faupala playing for Manchester City in 2016

Personal information
- Full name: David Gabriel Fabrice Faupala
- Date of birth: 11 February 1997 (age 29)
- Place of birth: Bully-les-Mines, France
- Height: 1.83 m (6 ft 0 in)
- Position: Striker

Team information
- Current team: Beauvais

Youth career
- 2003–2007: RC Sains En Gohelle
- 2007–2008: Lens
- 2008–2010: US Vermelles
- 2010–2015: Lens
- 2015–2016: Manchester City

Senior career*
Years	Team	Apps	(Gls)
2014	Lens II	3	(0)
2016–2017	Manchester City	0	(0)
2016	→ NAC Breda (loan)	3	(1)
2017	→ Chesterfield (loan)	14	(1)
2018	Zorya Luhansk	13	(0)
2018–2019	Apollon Limassol	10	(1)
2019–2020	Jerv	2	(0)
2020	Valletta	1	(0)
2021–2022	Beauvais	9	(1)

International career
2012–2013	France U16	12	(4)
2013	France U17	3	(0)
2014	France U18	2	(0)
- * Club domestic league appearances and goals as of 12:00, 20 December 2021 (UTC)

David Gabriel Fabrice Faupala (born 11 February 1997) is a French footballer who plays as a forward for Beauvais.

== Club career ==
=== Early life and career ===
Faupala was born in Bully-les-Mines, Pas-de-Calais of Wallisian descent. He joined Lens' youth setup in 2010, aged 13. After impressing within the youth sides with Lens, Faupala agreed to join Premier League side Manchester City on a three-year contract until 2018.

=== Manchester City ===
The 18-year-old immediately linked up with Manchester City Development Squad following his move and managed to score in his first friendly appearance for the club while on pre-season tour in Spain.

After experiencing a rich vein of form for the reserve side, netting four times in twelve appearances, Faupala was called up to the senior side ahead of Manchester City's FA Cup fifth round tie away to Premier League champions Chelsea. On 21 February 2016, Faupala made his senior debut in the 5–1 defeat, playing the full 90 minutes and scoring the equalising goal for City in the 37th minute.

==== Loan to NAC Breda ====
On 10 August 2016, Faupala was loaned to NAC Breda for the 2016–17 season. He made his debut on 19 August, as a 75th minute substitution for Thomas Agyepong in a 2–1 loss to Maastricht. His next appearance would come a month later on 20 September, when he would start in a KNVB Cup match, a 2–0 loss against VVV-Venlo. He scored his first goal for the club on 25 November during a 1–3 loss to SC Cambuur. The loan was ended on 2 January 2017, with Faupala having played 4 games.

==== Loan to Chesterfield ====
On 31 January 2017, Faupala was loaned to EFL League One side Chesterfield until 30 April 2017. He made his debut on 4 February, playing 90 minutes against Oldham Athletic. He scored his first goal for Chesterfield in his second match, a 3–1 loss to Northampton on 11 February. On 25 March, Faupala was shown a straight red in stoppage time for kicking out at an opponent, in a 3–1 loss to Rochdale.

=== Zorya Luhansk ===
Faupala announced on 6 November 2017 via an Instagram post that he had left Manchester City. On 6 February 2018 he signed 2+1 year contract with Ukrainian Premier League club Zorya Luhansk. He made his debut on 18 February 2018, playing 90 minutes in Zorya's 2–0 victory against Karpaty Lviv.

On 10 September 2019, Faupala joined Norwegian First Division side Jerv.

== Career statistics ==
As of match played 22 April 2019

Club	Season	League			Cup (Note: Includes FA Cup, KNVB Cup)		League Cup		Other		Total	
Club	Season	Division	Apps	Goals	Apps	Goals	Apps	Goals	Apps	Goals	Apps	Goals
Manchester City	2015–16	Premier League	0	0	1	1	0	0	0	0	1	1
NAC Breda (loan)	2016–17	Eerste Divisie	3	1	1	0	—		0	0	4	1
Chesterfield (loan)	2016–17	League One	14	1	0	0	0	0	0	0	14	1
Zorya Luhansk	2017–18	Ukrainian Premier League	13	0	0	0	—		0	0	13	0
Apollon Limassol	2018–19	Cypriot First Division	10	1	3	1	—		3	1	16	3
FK Jerv	2019	Norwegian First Division	2	0	0	0	—		0	0	2	0
Career total			42	3	5	2	0	0	3	1	50	6
