= Fernandinho (footballer, born May 1985) =

Brazilian footballer (born 1985)

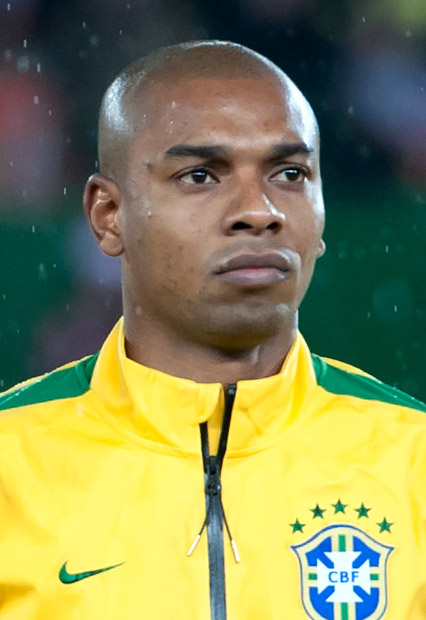
- Fernandinho lining up for Brazil in 2014

Personal information
- Full name: Fernando Luiz Roza
- Date of birth: 4 May 1985 (age 41)
- Place of birth: Londrina, Brazil
- Height: 1.79 m (5 ft 10 in)
- Position: Defensive midfielder

Youth career
- 1999–2000: PSTC
- 2000–2002: Atlético Paranaense

Senior career*
Years	Team	Apps	(Gls)
2002–2005	Atlético Paranaense	95	(21)
2005–2013	Shakhtar Donetsk	184	(31)
2013–2022	Manchester City	264	(20)
2022–2024	Athletico Paranaense	89	(7)
Total		632	(79)

International career
2003	Brazil U20	4	(1)
2011–2019	Brazil	53	(2)
Medal record
Men's football
Representing Brazil
Copa América
Winner	2019 Brazil
FIFA U-20 World Cup
Winner	2003 United Arab Emirates	U-20 Team
- * Club domestic league appearances and goals

Fernando Luiz Roza (born 4 May 1985), known as Fernandinho, is a Brazilian former professional footballer who played as a defensive midfielder. He is regarded as one of the best defensive midfielders of his generation and one of the best Brazilians to play in the Premier League.

Fernandinho started his career at Brazilian club Atlético Paranaense before moving to Shakhtar Donetsk in 2005, where he became one of the best foreign players to ever play in the Ukrainian Premier League. With Shakhtar, he won six Ukrainian Premier League titles, four Ukrainian Cups and the 2008–09 UEFA Cup. He was voted by the Shakhtar Donetsk fans as the best Brazilian player to ever play for the team. Fernandinho is well known for his nine-year spell with Premier League club Manchester City, with which he won five Premier League titles, six EFL Cups, and the FA Community Shield. He assumed the captaincy in the 2020–21 season and was instrumental in leading City to the 2021 Champions League final, where he earned a runners-up medal.

The scorer of the only goal in the final of the 2003 FIFA World Youth Championship and a full international for Brazil from 2011 to 2019, Fernandinho was part of their squad which came fourth at the 2014 FIFA World Cup and also competed at the 2015 Copa América, the 2018 FIFA World Cup, and the 2019 Copa América, winning the latter tournament.

== Club career ==
=== Atlético Paranaense ===
Fernandinho began his career at Atlético Paranaense alongside his future Shakhtar teammate Jádson and close friend Carlos. In Paranaense he was runners-up of both the Brazilian first division (in 2004) and the Libertadores da America, in 2005. He made 72 appearances for the club, scoring 14 goals, before moving to Ukrainian side Shakhtar Donetsk for a fee of around £7 million in the summer of 2005.

=== Shakhtar Donetsk ===
==== 2005–09: Initial league championships and UEFA Cup ====
In his first season as a Shakhtar player he played 34 matches, including 23 league appearances, and scored three goals, with one coming in the league. Shakhtar were victorious in the Super Cup, however Fernandinho did not play in the match. He played in the championship deciding match between Shakhtar and Dynamo Kyiv, who were level on 75 points after all 30 games had been played, in which Shakhtar prevailed 2–1 to take the title. This marked Fernandinho's first league title with Shakhtar. He made 25 league appearances in the 2006–07 season as Shakhtar finished 2nd to Dynamo Kyiv. They also finished as runners-up in the Ukrainian Cup and Ukrainian Super Cup.

In the 2007–08 season Shakhtar regained the championship with Fernandinho playing a pivotal role by scoring 11 goals, including one from the penalty spot, in 29 league appearances. He failed to appear in just one league match during the season. Shakhtar were also victorious in the Ukrainian Cup, giving Fernandinho his first cup success. However they were defeated in the Super Cup by Dynamo Kyiv for the second year in a row. After the match finished 2–2, it went to penalties and, although Fernandinho converted a penalty, Shakhtar lost 4–2.

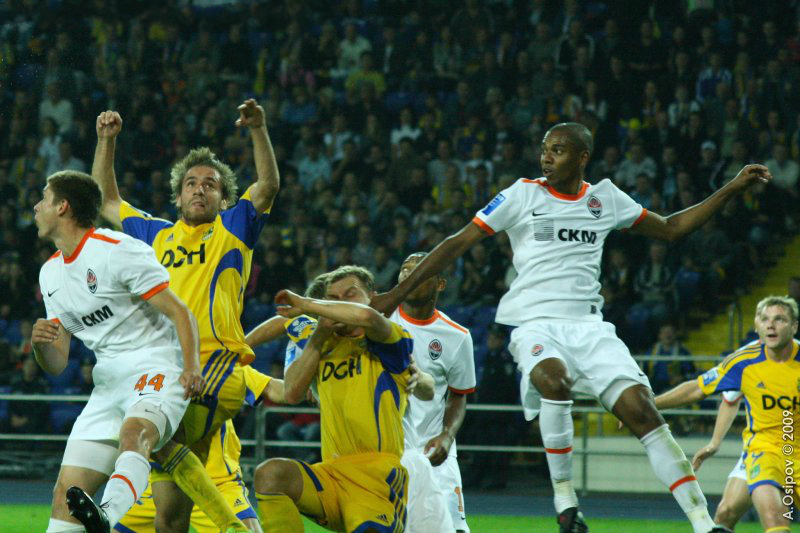
Fernandinho playing for Shakhtar Donetsk in 2009

On 15 July 2008, Fernandinho played in the Super Cup victory against Dynamo Kyiv. The match went to penalties after the two teams drew 1–1 at the end of extra time. Fernandinho scored one of the penalties to help Shakhtar to a 5–3 win in the shoot-out. He scored the equalising goal in a 1–1 draw with Karpaty Lviv on 27 July. On 3 August he picked up a 63rd minute red card in a 3–0 victory over Illichivets Mariupol. On 31 August he scored a penalty in a 2–2 draw against Metalurh Zaporizhya. On 16 September he scored the opening goal in a 2–1 Champions League victory against Swiss club Basel. On 8 November, he scored the opening goal in a 2–0 victory against Tavriya Simferopol. On 9 December he scored a goal in Shakhtar's 3–2 away win against Spanish side Barcelona in the Champions League group stage match.

On 26 February 2009, Fernandinho scored the equalising goal in Shakhtar's 1–1 away leg draw against English team Tottenham Hotspur in the UEFA Cup. Shakhtar won the tie 3–1 on aggregate. On 7 March, he scored the only goal, a penalty, in a 1–0 victory against Dnipro Dnipropetrovsk. On 15 March, he opened the scoring from the penalty spot in a 3–0 victory against Metalist Kharkiv. On 19 March he scored a penalty in Shakhtar's 2–0 victory over Russian team CSKA Moscow in the UEFA Cup. Shakhtar won the tie 2–1 on aggregate. On 16 April he netted a goal in a 2–1 UEFA Cup win against Marseille. Shakhtar emerged victorious from the tie with a 4–1 aggregate win. He also scored a pivotal equalising goal in the first leg of the UEFA Cup semi final match against Dynamo Kyiv which finished 1–1. Shakhtar advanced to the final by virtue of a 3–2 aggregate victory after securing a 2–1 win at the Donbas Arena in the second leg.

Shakhtar won the UEFA Cup with a 2–1 victory over German side Werder Bremen in the last UEFA Cup before it was renamed the UEFA Europa League. He made 42 total appearances, including 21 in the league, and scored 11 goals, including five in the league, in the 2008–09 season.

==== 2009–13: Domestic dominance and individual success ====
The 2009–10 season saw Shakhtar lift the Premier League trophy. Fernandinho's first goal came on 29 July, in a 2–2 Champions League draw against Politehnica Timișoara in the third qualifying round, however Shakhtar were knocked out of the competition, losing on away goals after a 0–0 draw at home. On 20 September, he scored a penalty in a 4–2 victory over Arsenal Kyiv. He scored two goals in a 5–1 victory over Karpaty Lviv on 18 October, including one from the penalty spot. On 22 October the first goal, a penalty, in a 4–0 victory against French side Toulouse in the Europa League. He scored a 93rd-minute goal in a 2–0 Ukrainian Cup victory against Dynamo Kyiv on 28 October. On 6 December he scored a penalty to open the scoring in a 2–0 win over Kryvbas. On 24 March, he scored a 92nd-minute goal against Metalurh Donetsk in the Ukrainian Cup, however it proved to be only a consolation goal as Shakhtar lost the match 2–1. Fernandinho made 24 league appearances, netting 4 times. He made a total of 39 appearances with 8 goals.

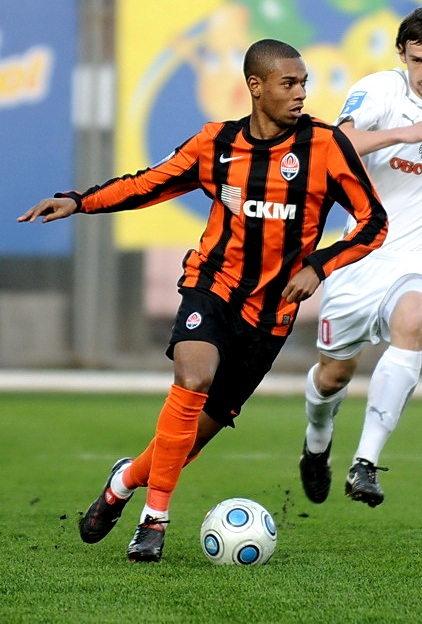
Fernandinho playing for Shakhtar Donetsk in 2010

In the following season Fernandinho played in the 7–1 Super Cup win over Tavriya Simferopol on 4 July. On 18 July, he netted an equalising goal in a 1–1 draw with Metalurh Zaporizhya. On 7 August he scored the opening goal in a 5–0 win over Sevastopol. He also played a part in the 1–0 UEFA Super Cup defeat to Barcelona on 28 August. He suffered a broken leg in a 1–0 defeat to Obolon Kyiv on 10 September, which was expected to rule him out for the entire season. He eventually returned on 1 April 2011 after almost seven months out of action in a 3–1 victory over Illichivets Mariupol. He scored a late 94th-minute match-winning goal in a 2–1 victory over Tavriya, his first goal since returning from injury. On 25 May, he played the full 90 minutes in Shakhtar's 2–0 Ukrainian Cup Final victory over Dynamo Kyiv. At the end of the season Shakhtar won the championship, with Fernandinho contributing three goals from his 15 league appearances. They managed to win three prizes (Premier League, Cup and Super Cup).

Fernandinho began the 2011–12 season with Shakhtar's only goal in a 3–1 Super Cup defeat to Dynamo Kyiv. On 31 July he scored Shakhtar's only goal in a match against Arsenal Kyiv, however a 95th-minute equaliser prevented them from winning the match and taking all three points. He netted a goal in a 3–1 victory against Dnipro Dnipropetrovsk on 13 August. On 27 November he scored the second goal, from a penalty, in a 5–0 victory over Karpaty Lviv. On 27 April, he scored a penalty in a 4–3 Ukrainian Cup match against Volyn Lutsk. He netted the winning goal in a 2–1 victory against Metalist Kharkiv on 2 May. He scored six goals in 32 appearances, with 24 appearances and four goals in the league, over the season. He played in the Ukrainian Cup Final victory over Metalurh Donetsk. At the end of the season, with his contract due to expire, he signed a new five-year contract with the club until 2016. Shakhtar retained the league title for the third year in a row, Fernandinho's fifth overall with the club, and also secured another Cup trophy, their second in a row.

Fernandinho started the 2012–13 season by assisting Douglas Costa for the second goal in a 2–0 Super Cup victory over Metalurh Donetsk. This marked his third success in the Super Cup with Shakhtar. He assisted Yevhen Seleznyov's goal in the 3–1 victory over Hoverla Uzhhorod. He netted a late goal to earn Shakhtar three points in a 1–0 win over Kryvbas. He assisted Henrikh Mkhitaryan for the first goal in a 4–1 victory over Vorskla Poltava. On 23 September, he scored a goal in a 4–1 Ukrainian Cup last 32 victory against Dynamo Kyiv and was named man of the match. He assisted Henrikh Mkhitaryan for the second goal in a 2–0 victory against Metalist Kharkiv on 7 October. Fernandinho scored the second goal in a 2–1 victory against English side Chelsea in the Champions League group stage on 23 October, shooting low with his right foot into the bottom corner.

=== Manchester City ===
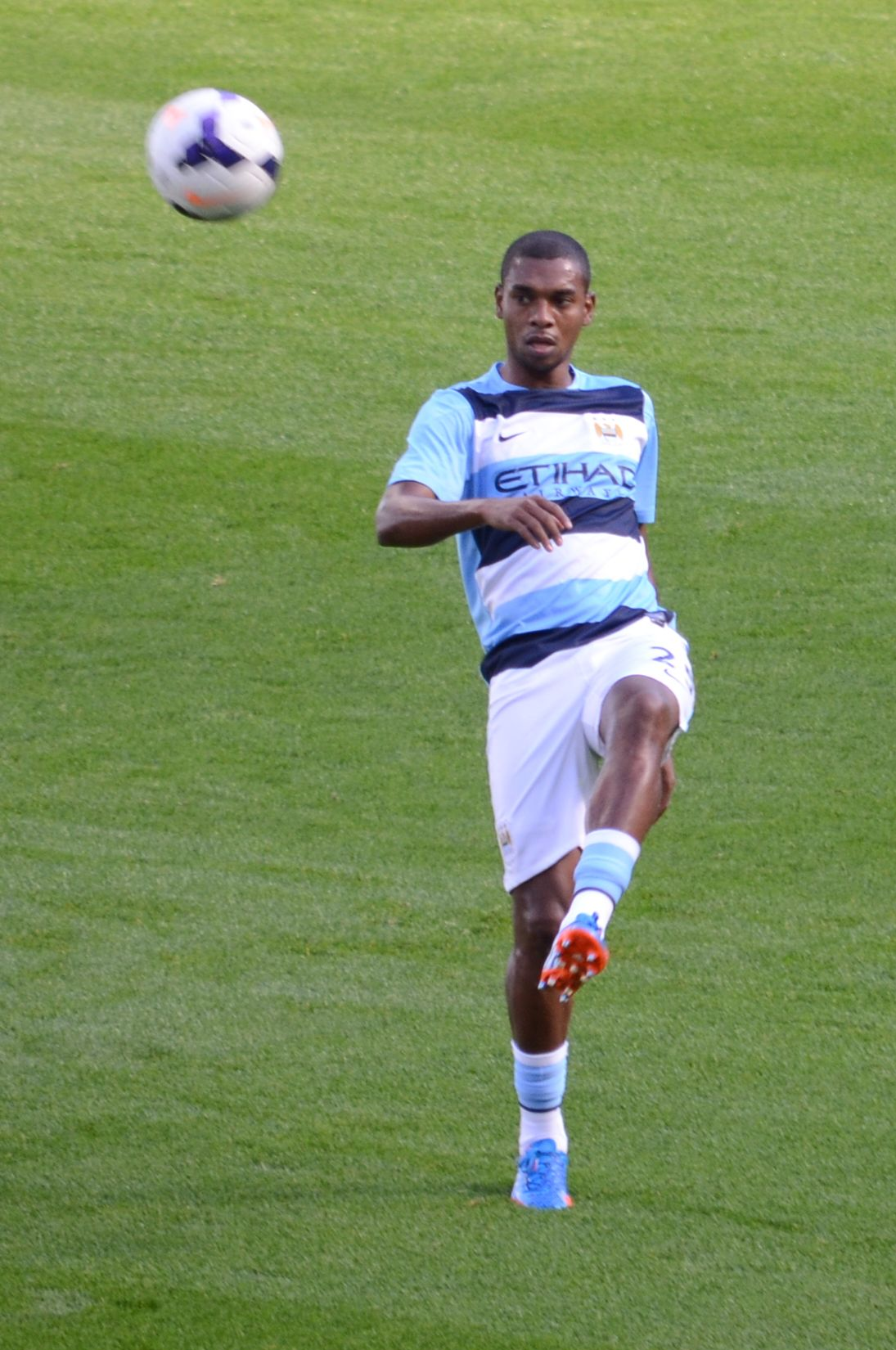
Fernandinho playing for Manchester City in September 2013

On 6 June 2013, Fernandinho became Manchester City's first signing of the summer, for a fee of £34 million. He signed a four-year deal and is understood to have waived around £4 million owed to him by Shakhtar in order to complete the transfer, as he was desperate to secure a move away from the Ukrainian club. During his time at Shakhtar, the Brazilian wore the number 7 shirt, but due to midfielder James Milner already occupying the number at City, Fernandinho had to choose another. In an interview with Manchester City, Fernandinho recalled a conversation with his son in which his son said, "My dad is the new number 25," and so Fernandinho subsequently chose 25 as his new number.

==== 2013–14: Premier League win ====
Fernandinho made his Premier League debut on 19 August 2013 against Newcastle United in a 4–0 home win. He scored his first two goals for Manchester City on 14 December 2013 against Arsenal in a 6–3 home win and was also named man of the match after a classical display. On 1 January 2014, he scored his third goal of the season in a 2–3 away win against Swansea City. On 2 February, Fernandinho sustained a thigh injury in training, which kept him out of action for two weeks.

On 2 March, Fernandinho appeared for City in the League Cup final against Sunderland, where he won his first trophy in England with a 3–1 win. On 11 May, Fernandinho was part of the squad who secured the Premier League title in a 2–0 win against West Ham United. He did not start the game, but appeared as a substitute for striker Edin Džeko in the 69th minute.

==== 2014–17: Positional changes and adaptation ====
On 5 November 2014, in a 2014–15 Champions League group match against CSKA Moscow, Fernandinho replaced Jesús Navas at half-time with Manchester City 1–2 down at home. He was then sent off in the 70th minute for a second booking, with teammate Yaya Touré following later, as the team lost and fell to last place in the group.

On 16 August 2015, Fernandinho scored the final goal in City's 3–0 win over Chelsea. He added to his tally two weeks later, with his club's second goal in a City defeat of Watford in the Premier League. Fernandinho started as City beat Liverpool in the 2016 Football League Cup Final. He scored to put City 1–0 up and then missed his penalty in the subsequent shootout after Liverpool equalised, but City still won the game.

Fernandinho's role in the club became so significant that the manager, Pep Guardiola, said: “If a team has three Fernandinhos, they would be champions. We have one, but he is fast, he is intelligent, he is strong in the air, he can play several positions. When he sees the space he will run there immediately. When you need to make a correction, you just need one player to challenge, and he is there.”

==== 2017–22: Sustained domestic success, captaincy, and departure ====
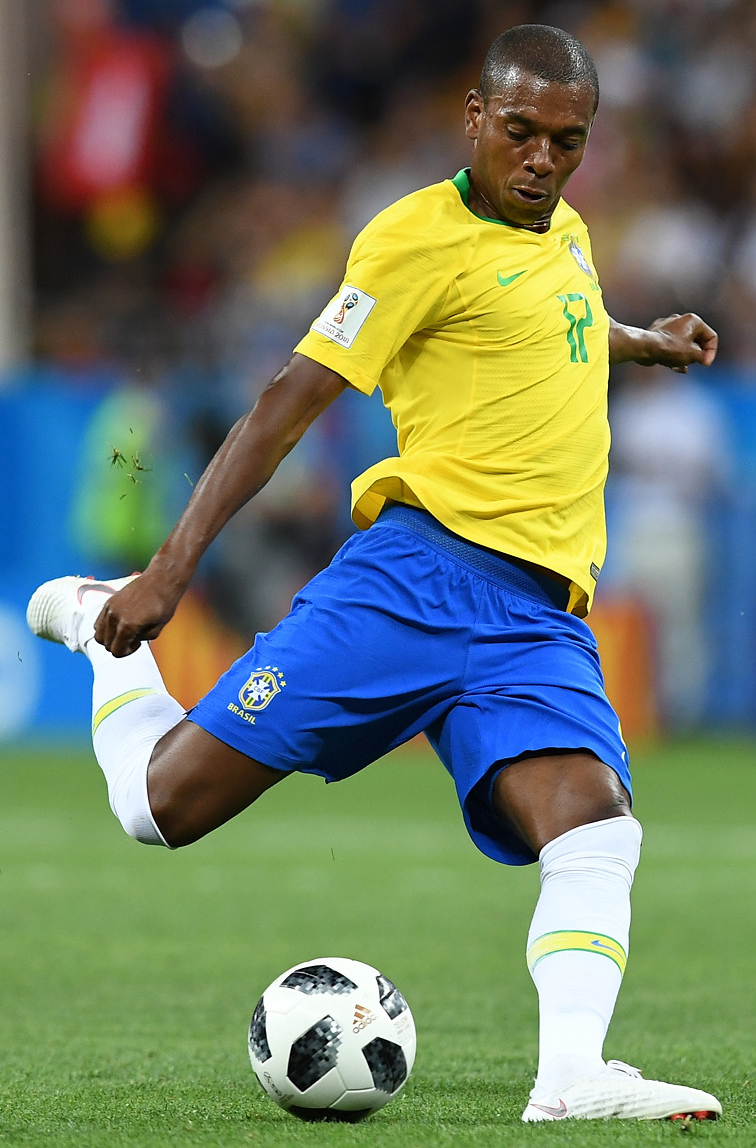
Fernandinho in 2018

Fernandinho continued to play a vital role for Manchester City in the 2017–18 season, helping them win their third Premier League title, and his second. He scored three goals and provided three assists in 30 appearances for the title winners. Fernandinho also appeared in the 2018 League Cup final for City when they defeated Arsenal 3–0, however he was substituted after 52 minutes because of an injury.

Following the departure of Yaya Touré, Fernandinho began the season as Manchester City's only natural defensive midfielder. The Brazilian played a vital role in the club's demanding title race against Liverpool, starting every Premier League match until a thigh injury prevented him from playing against Crystal Palace and Leicester City in December - two games that the team subsequently lost. However, Fernandinho was able to return to fitness in time for a season-defining home match against title rivals Liverpool. He was named the Man of the Match following a highly praised performance in midfield that helped City beat their rivals 2–1. Of the performance, the BBC Sport's Phil McNulty wrote, "At the heart of it all was the magnificent Fernandinho - a man seemingly irreplaceable among the City's stellar cast - as he delivered a masterclass of controlled midfield play to steady his side when required."

In February's EFL Cup final against Chelsea, Fernandinho picked up a muscle injury during extra time and, for the remainder of the season, struggled to remain fit. İlkay Gündoğan took his place in City's midfield for the majority of the remaining games, which saw the team go on a 14 game winning-streak to win the Premier League title on the final day of the season. Fernandinho ended the Premier League season with one goal and three assists in 29 appearances.

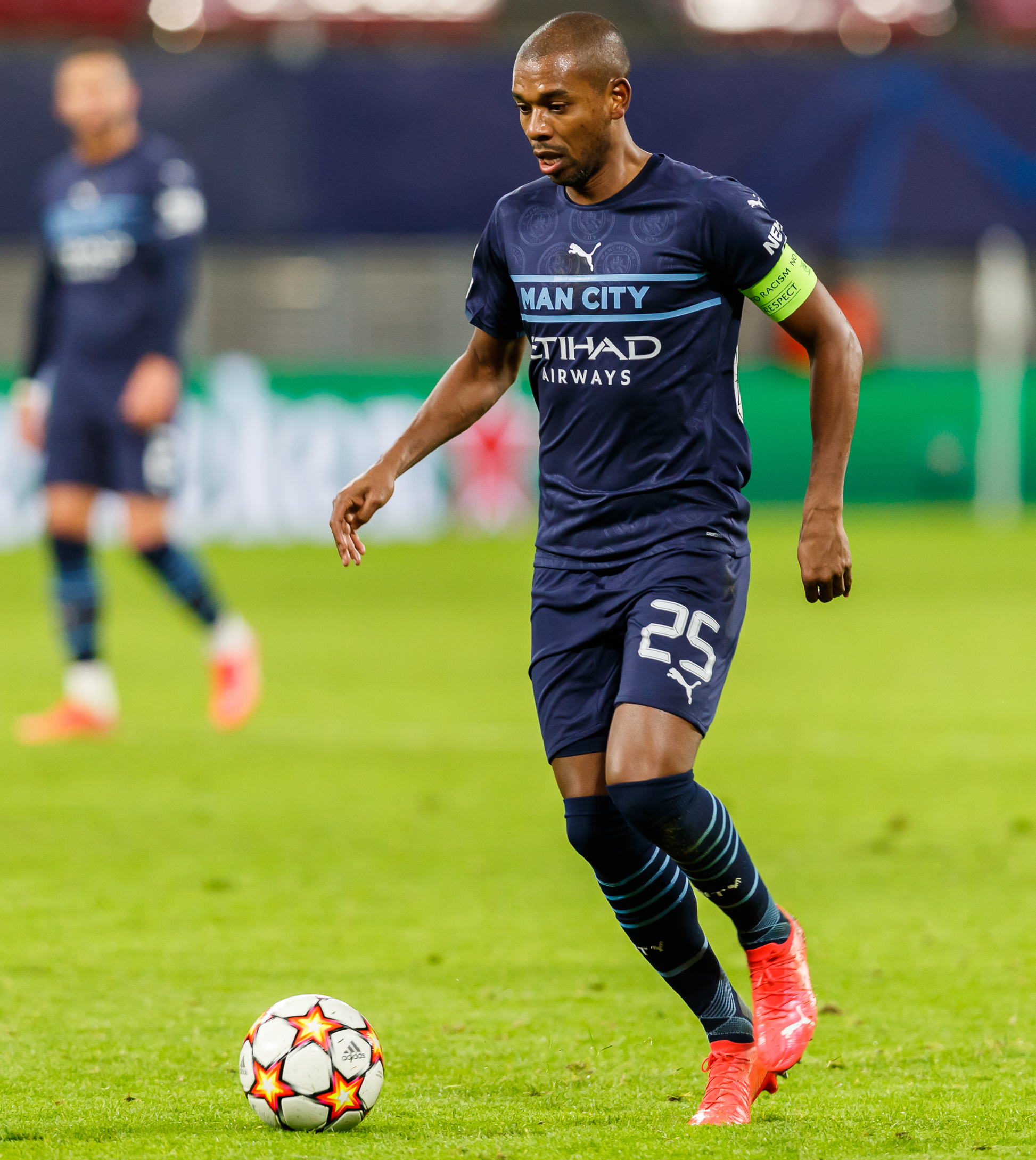
Fernandinho playing for Manchester City in 2021

With Fernandinho's age becoming an area of concern for the club, Manchester City signed Rodri from Atlético Madrid over the summer. Because of the new midfield acquisition, Gündogan's excellent performances as a defensive midfielder at the end of the previous season, and central defender Vincent Kompany's departure, Guardiola planned to use Fernandinho as a back-up central defender throughout the season. An injury to first-choice centre-half Aymeric Laporte just 4 weeks into the season, however, meant that the manager had to rely on Fernandinho to lead his defensive line. He subsequently started nearly every Premier League match following Laporte's injury, with all of his appearances for the season being in central defence. On 28 January 2020, it was announced that he had signed a one-year contract extension with the club.

On 20 September 2020, Guardiola confirmed that Fernandinho was selected as the club's new captain, following the departure of David Silva. On 25 April 2021, Fernandinho lifted his first piece of silverware as Manchester City captain. He started the League Cup final, as City won 1–0 against Tottenham Hotspur to win the competition for the fourth year in a row. It was the 6th of Fernandinho’s career, making him the competition’s most decorated player. On 11 May 2021, local rivals Manchester United were defeated 2–1 by Leicester City, securing City’s fifth Premier league title and seventh First Division title overall. This was Fernandinho’s fourth Premier League title and his first as captain. On 29 June 2021, Fernandinho once again signed a new one-year deal with the Citizens.

On 12 February 2022, after an impressive performance against Norwich City, Jamie Redknapp referred to Fernandinho as the “number 1 defensive midfielder the Premier League has ever seen” whilst mentioning that he thought Fernandinho was a better player than the former Arsenal and France midfielder Patrick Vieira, former Manchester United legend Roy Keane and former Chelsea midfielder Claude Makélélé. On 9 March, Fernandinho made his 100th Champions League appearance in a 0–0 draw against Sporting CP.

On 12 April, Fernandinho announced that he would be leaving Manchester City at the end of the season. Later that month, on 30 April, his stoppage-time goal in the 4–0 away victory over Leeds United earned him the inaugural Premier League Most Powerful Goal award, with Opta calculating the shot's average speed at 117.6 kilometres per hour (73.1 mph).

=== Return to Athletico Paranaense and retirement ===
On 28 June 2022, Fernardinho returned to Campeonato Brasileiro Série A club Athletico Paranaense. He started in the 2022 Copa Libertadores final, his second continental final with the team, losing 1–0 to Flamengo. He also won his second and third Paraná state championship titles with Athletico in 2023 and 2024.

Fernandinho left Athletico at the expiry of his contract in December 2024. On 20 November 2025, he announced his retirement as a professional player.

== International career ==
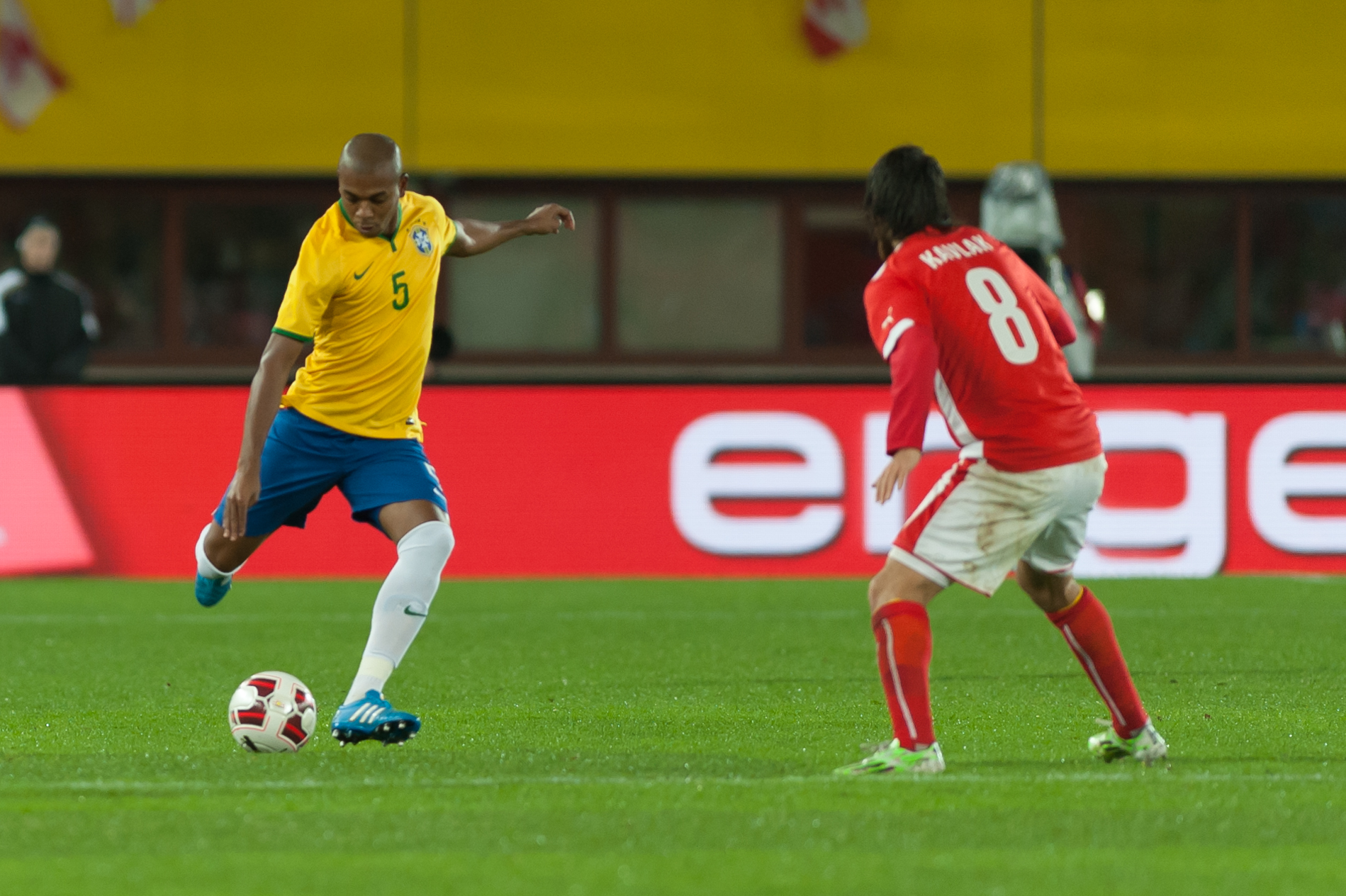
Fernandinho in action for the Brazil national team against Austria, in a friendly match in 2014

On 11 August 2011, Fernandinho made his first appearance for the Brazil national team in a 3–2 friendly defeat against Germany. He won four further caps during the 2011–12 season but did not appear in another Seleção squad until February 2014.

On 5 March 2014, Fernandinho scored his first international goal on his return to the Brazil team in a 5–0 win over South Africa. In May 2014, he was named in Brazil's squad for the 2014 FIFA World Cup. He made his tournament debut as a half-time substitute for Paulinho in the third game of the group stage, scoring the last goal in the 4–1 victory against Cameroon. He was then selected in the starting line-up for Brazil's penalty shootout defeat of Chile in the round of 16. Fernandinho played a full match against Colombia in the quarter-finals, and played the first 45 minutes before being taken off in Brazil's 1–7 loss to Germany in the semi-finals: Brazil's biggest ever defeat at the World Cup.

In May 2018, Fernandinho was named in Tite's final 23-man squad for the 2018 FIFA World Cup in Russia. On 6 July, Brazil were eliminated from the 2018 World Cup by Belgium in the quarter-finals, losing 2–1, with Fernandinho scoring an own goal for Belgium.

In May 2019, Fernandinho was included in Brazil's 23-man squad for the 2019 Copa América, held on home soil. He featured in the side's opening two group matches as they went on to win the tournament.

== Style of play and impact ==
Fernandinho was well known for his pace and ability to shoot from long distances, as well as his energy, technique, movement, and work-rate. He was described in the media as "a defensive midfielder with a box to box style of play, contributing in large part to the defense and the attack. With a powerful shot and great passing range, Fernandinho played an important part in breaking up opposition attacks and creating goal scoring opportunities". Jonathan Wilson, when writing for The Guardian in 2013, described Fernandinho as a holding midfielder who can "make tackles," and who is "capable of regaining the ball," while also noting that he frequently functioned "as the more "creative player alongside a destroyer." However, he also clarified that while "Fernandinho was a fine long passer, [...] he is not an Alonso or an Andrea Pirlo type; he is not a regista. Rather he likes to make forward surges, just as Touré does, and, [...] is more than capable of scoring goals when chances present themselves." As such, he labelled Fernandinho as a "carrier" or "surger," namely "a player capable of making late runs or carrying the ball at his feet." Manchester City manager Pep Guardiola praised Fernandinho for his intelligence, versatility, ability in the air, and wide range of skills, noting that "Fernandinho can do everything," also citing his important role in the club's successes. Due to a series of injuries to the Manchester City first team's defensive players, Guardiola also deployed Fernandinho as a centre-back on occasion during the 2019–20 season, a position in which he received praise in the media for his performances.

The importance and magnitude of work played by Fernandinho in Manchester City also became apparent in his absence. The three defeats in December 2018 in the Premier League were mostly attributed to the fact Fernandinho didn't play due to injury. Based on the statistics from around that time, it was found that City won 10% more games when Fernandinho was in the starting line-up, and the main reason being his ability to both destroy a rival's attack, and create new opportunities for his team through his long-distance passes.

== Personal life ==
Fernandinho is married and has one son, Davi, born on 5 March 2010, and a daughter, Mariana, born on 28 January 2017. Aside from his native Portuguese, Fernandinho reportedly speaks Russian, Italian, Spanish and English. Fernandinho is a devout Christian; concerning his personal faith, he has stated: "Jesus is my biggest inspiration."

== Career statistics ==
=== Club ===
Appearances and goals by club, season and competition
Club	Season	League			State league (Note: Includes Campeonato Paranaense)		National cup (Note: Includes Ukrainian Cup, FA Cup, Copa do Brasil)		League cup (Note: Includes Football League/EFL Cup)		Continental		Other		Total	
Club	Season	Division	Apps	Goals	Apps	Goals	Apps	Goals	Apps	Goals	Apps	Goals	Apps	Goals	Apps	Goals
Atlético Paranaense	2003	Série A	29	5	0	0	0	0	—		—		—		29	5
Atlético Paranaense	2004	Série A	41	9	16	4	—		—		—		—		57	13
Atlético Paranaense	2005	Série A	2	0	7	3	0	0	—		9 (Note: Appearances in Copa Libertadores)	1	0	0	18	4
Atlético Paranaense	Total		72	14	23	7	0	0	—		9	1	—		104	22
Shakhtar Donetsk	2005–06	Vyshcha Liha	23	1	—		2	1	—		9 (Note: Two appearances in UEFA Champions League, seven appearances and one goal in UEFA Cup)	1	0	0	34	3
Shakhtar Donetsk	2006–07	Vyshcha Liha	25	1	—		3	0	—		11 (Note: Seven appearances and two goals in UEFA Champions League, four appearances and one goal in UEFA Cup)	3	1 (Note: Appearance in Ukrainian Super Cup)	0	40	4
Shakhtar Donetsk	2007–08	Vyshcha Liha	29	11	—		3	1	—		8 (Note: Appearances in UEFA Champions League)	0	1	0	41	12
Shakhtar Donetsk	2008–09	Ukrainian Premier League	21	5	—		3	0	—		17 (Note: Eight appearances and two goals in UEFA Champions League, nine appearances and four goals in UEFA Cup)	6	1	0	42	11
Shakhtar Donetsk	2009–10	Ukrainian Premier League	24	4	—		2	2	—		12 (Note: Two appearances and one goal in UEFA Champions League, ten appearances and one goal in UEFA Europa League)	2	1 (Note: Appearance in UEFA Super Cup)	0	39	8
Shakhtar Donetsk	2010–11	Ukrainian Premier League	15	3	—		2	0	—		2	0	1	0	20	3
Shakhtar Donetsk	2011–12	Ukrainian Premier League	24	4	—		3	1	—		4	0	1	1	32	6
Shakhtar Donetsk	2012–13	Ukrainian Premier League	23	2	—		4	3	—		8	1	1	0	36	6
Shakhtar Donetsk	Total		184	31	—		22	8	—		71	13	7	1	284	53
Manchester City	2013–14	Premier League	33	5	—		2	0	3	0	8	0	—		46	5
Manchester City	2014–15	Premier League	33	3	—		1	0	2	0	7	0	0	0	43	3
Manchester City	2015–16	Premier League	33	2	—		1	0	4	2	12	2	—		50	6
Manchester City	2016–17	Premier League	32	2	—		3	0	0	0	9	1	—		44	3
Manchester City	2017–18	Premier League	34	5	—		3	0	3	0	8	0	—		48	5
Manchester City	2018–19	Premier League	29	1	—		3	0	1	0	8	0	1 (Note: Appearance in FA Community Shield)	0	42	1
Manchester City	2019–20	Premier League	30	0	—		1	0	2	0	8	0	0	0	41	0
Manchester City	2020–21	Premier League	21	0	—		4	0	4	1	7	0	—		36	1
Manchester City	2021–22	Premier League	19	2	—		4	0	1	0	8	0	1	0	33	2
Manchester City	Total		264	20	—		22	0	20	3	75	3	2	0	383	26
Athletico Paranaense	2022	Série A	13	1	—		2	0	—		5	0	—		20	1
Athletico Paranaense	2023	Série A	25	1	15	1	5	0	—		6	1	—		51	3
Athletico Paranaense	2024	Série A	25	2	11	2	3	2	—		7 (Note: Appearances in Copa Sudamericana)	2	—		46	8
Athletico Paranaense	Total		63	4	26	3	10	2	—		18	3	—		117	12
Career total			583	69	49	10	54	10	20	3	173	20	9	1	897	113

=== International ===
Appearances and goals by national team and year
National team	Year	Apps	Goals
Brazil	2011	4	0
Brazil	2012	1	0
Brazil	2013	0	0
Brazil	2014	11	2
Brazil	2015	11	0
Brazil	2016	6	0
Brazil	2017	8	0
Brazil	2018	8	0
Brazil	2019	4	0
Total		53	2

Scores and results list Brazil's goal tally first, score column indicates score after each Fernandinho goal.

List of international goals scored by Fernandinho
No.	Date	Venue	Cap	Opponent	Score	Result	Competition
1	5 March 2014	Soccer City, Johannesburg, South Africa	6	South Africa	4–0	5–0	Friendly
2	23 June 2014	Estádio Nacional Mané Garrincha, Brasília, Brazil	8	Cameroon	4–1	4–1	2014 FIFA World Cup

== Honours ==
Athletico Paranaense

- Campeonato Paranaense: 2005, 2023, 2024
- Copa Libertadores runner-up: 2005, 2022

Shakhtar Donetsk

- Vyshcha Liha/Ukrainian Premier League: 2005–06, 2007–08, 2009–10, 2010–11, 2011–12, 2012–13
- Ukrainian Cup: 2007–08, 2010–11, 2011–12, 2012–13
- Ukrainian Super Cup: 2008, 2012
- UEFA Cup: 2008–09

Manchester City

- Premier League: 2013–14, 2017–18, 2018–19, 2020–21, 2021–22
- Football League Cup/EFL Cup: 2013–14, 2015–16, 2017–18, 2018–19, 2019–20, 2020–21
- FA Community Shield: 2018
- UEFA Champions League runner-up: 2020–21

Brazil U20

- FIFA World Youth Championship: 2003

Brazil

- Copa América: 2019

Individual

- Top Player of the Ukrainian Premier League: 2007–08
- PFA Team of the Year: 2018–19 Premier League
- Manchester City Goal of the Season: 2017–18
- Premier League Most Powerful Goal: 2021–22
