= Fernando (footballer, born 1987) =

Brazilian footballer

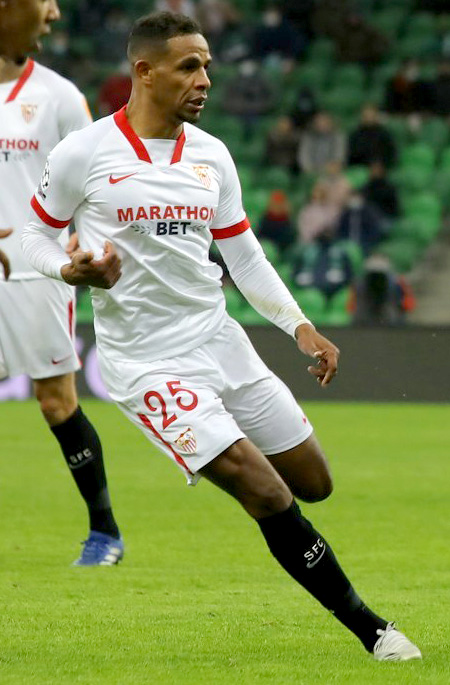
- Fernando playing for Sevilla in 2020

Personal information
- Full name: Fernando Francisco Reges
- Date of birth: 25 July 1987 (age 39)
- Place of birth: Alto Paraíso, Brazil
- Height: 1.83 m (6 ft 0 in)
- Position: Defensive midfielder

Youth career
- 2003–2005: Vila Nova

Senior career*
Years	Team	Apps	(Gls)
2006–2007	Vila Nova	57	(3)
2007–2014	Porto	142	(2)
2007–2008	→ Estrela Amadora (loan)	26	(1)
2014–2017	Manchester City	64	(4)
2017–2019	Galatasaray	47	(4)
2019–2023	Sevilla	119	(6)
2024	Vila Nova	6	(0)
2024–2025	Internacional	39	(2)
Total		510	(22)

International career
2007	Brazil U20	3	(0)
Medal record
Representing Brazil
South American U20 Championship
Winner	2007 Paraguay
- * Club domestic league appearances and goals

Fernando Francisco Reges (born 25 July 1987), known simply as Fernando (Brazilian Portuguese: [feʁˈnɐ̃du]), is a Brazilian former professional footballer who played as a defensive midfielder.

He spent the longest spell of his career with Porto after signing in 2007, going on to appear in 237 competitive matches and win 12 major titles, including four Primeira Liga championships and the 2011 Europa League. He also played in England, Turkey and Spain, winning the domestic league twice with Galatasaray, the 2016 League Cup with Manchester City and the 2020 and 2023 Europa Leagues with Sevilla.

Fernando represented Brazil at under-20 level.

== Club career ==
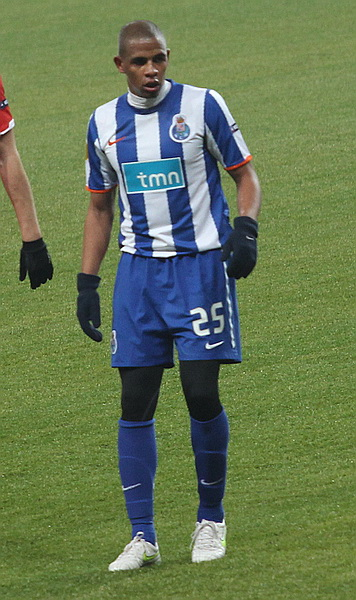
Fernando with Porto in 2010

=== Porto ===
Fernando was born in Alto Paraíso de Goiás. In June 2007, he signed a five-year contract with Porto directly from the Série C, having started his career at Vila Nova. However, he spent his first year in Portugal loaned to Estrela da Amadora, where he was first choice.

In the 2008–09 season, having returned to Porto, Fernando was an ever-present midfield fixture alongside the established Lucho González and Raul Meireles, as the northerners achieved a fourth consecutive Primeira Liga title. He continued to be a starter when healthy, appearing in 41 competitive games during the 2010–11 campaign (including two goals in nearly 3,000 minutes of action) as his team won the treble.

On 9 February 2014, following an extensive negotiation that inclusively saw the player being suspended, Fernando renewed his contract with Porto until 2017.

=== Manchester City ===
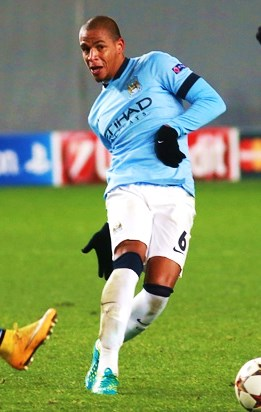
Fernando playing for Manchester City in 2014

On 25 June 2014, Fernando completed a move to Manchester City for an undisclosed fee believed to be in the region of £12 million; upon arriving, he said: "I will give my all every time I play and I'm looking forward to many happy years in Manchester". He made his competitive debut on 10 August in the 2014 FA Community Shield, playing the full 90 minutes in a 0–3 loss against Arsenal at Wembley. He first appeared in the Premier League a week later, in a 2–0 win away to Newcastle United.

Fernando scored his first goal for City on 26 December 2014, contributing to a 3–1 away victory over West Bromwich Albion. He featured 90 minutes in the final of the League Cup on 28 February 2016, helping defeat Liverpool on penalties. On 4 May, he scored an own goal after 20 minutes of the UEFA Champions League semi-final fixture against Real Madrid at the Santiago Bernabéu – the first time the club coached by Manuel Pellegrini had reached that stage– in an eventual 1–0 loss (also on aggregate).

During his three-year spell at the Etihad, Fernando played 102 official matches and scored four times.

=== Galatasaray ===
On 4 August 2017, Fernando signed with Galatasaray on a three-year contract for an initial fee of €5.25 million; in a note published on the Turkish club's official website, it was confirmed that the payment would ascend based on the accomplishment of certain performance variables during his spell. He made his Süper Lig debut in the first fixture, playing 82 minutes in a 4–1 home defeat of Kayserispor. He made 26 competitive appearances during the season, scoring on 9 December in a 4–2 home victory against Akhisar Belediyespor and repeating the feat the following 29 April to help defeat reigning champions Beşiktaş 2–0 at home, a result which proved decisive for achieving the league title.

=== Sevilla ===
On 12 July 2019, aged 32, Fernando joined Sevilla of La Liga for a fee of €4.5 million, agreeing to a deal until 30 June 2022. He made his debut on 18 August in a 2–0 win at Espanyol on the first day of the season, and scored his first league goal on 23 February 2020 in a 3–0 away victory over Getafe CF; he added another on 11 June in a 2–0 win against city rivals Real Betis. He made seven appearances in the team's successful campaign in the UEFA Europa League, including the 3–2 defeat of Inter Milan in the final in Cologne.

In the final stretch of 2020–21, Fernando scored in wins at Celta and Real Sociedad, as well as a draw away to Real Madrid, as Sevilla finished in fourth place. At the start of the following calendar year, with over 100 club appearances to his name, the 34-year-old added two more seasons to his contract.

Fernando reached a mutual agreement to terminate his contract in December 2023, for personal reasons, facilitating his return to Brazil.

=== Vila Nova return and Internacional ===
On 10 January 2024, Fernando returned to his first club Vila Nova after 17 years away. On 21 February, however, he left and joined Internacional on a two-year deal. He scored in his first appearance in Série A aged 36, completing a 2–1 comeback win over Bahia through a header; under Eduardo Coudet, he was also deployed as a centre-back.

== International career ==
Fernando was in the Brazil under-20 squad at the 2007 South American Youth Championship, where he was sent off in the second round against Chile for assaulting referee Albert Duarte, as the nation went on to win the tournament in Paraguay. Subsequently, he received a one-year ban from CONMEBOL competitions for his actions and was not included for the following tournament in the category, the 2007 FIFA World Cup.

In January 2013, Fernando declared: "Even if someone asked me to naturalize, I would refuse. My dream is to play for Brazil. I'm sure one day I will wear the amarelinha". However, in December, he became a Portuguese citizen, applying to FIFA in March 2014 to change his international allegiance to Portugal. Despite this, under article 8.1 of the governing body's statutes, he was only eligible to represent Brazil internationally as he previously played for that country at under-20 level and did not hold Portuguese citizenship at that time.

== Career statistics ==
As of match played 7 December 2024

Appearances and goals by club, season and competition
Club	Season	League			State league (Note: Includes Campeonato Goiano)		National cup (Note: Includes Taça de Portugal, FA Cup, Turkish Cup, Copa del Rey, Copa do Brasil)		League cup (Note: Includes Taça da Liga, Football League/EFL Cup)		Continental		Other		Total	
Club	Season	Division	Apps	Goals	Apps	Goals	Apps	Goals	Apps	Goals	Apps	Goals	Apps	Goals	Apps	Goals
Estrela Amadora	2007–08	Primeira Liga	26	1	—		3	0	2	0	—		—		31	1
Porto	2008–09	Primeira Liga	25	0	—		4	0	2	0	10 (Note: Appearances in UEFA Champions League)	0	0	0	41	0
Porto	2009–10	Primeira Liga	25	0	—		6	0	1	0	6	0	1 (Note: Appearance in Supertaça Cândido de Oliveira)	0	39	0
Porto	2010–11	Primeira Liga	21	0	—		4	0	1	1	14 (Note: Appearances in UEFA Europa League)	1	1	0	41	2
Porto	2011–12	Primeira Liga	22	1	—		1	0	2	0	8 (Note: Six appearances in UEFA Champions League, two appearances in UEFA Europa League)	0	1 (Note: Appearance in UEFA Super Cup)	0	34	1
Porto	2012–13	Primeira Liga	24	1	—		1	0	5	1	6	0	1	0	37	2
Porto	2013–14	Primeira Liga	25	0	—		4	1	4	0	11 (Note: Six appearances in UEFA Champions League, five appearances in UEFA Europa League)	0	1	0	45	1
Porto	Total		142	2	—		20	1	15	2	55	1	5	0	237	6
Manchester City	2014–15	Premier League	25	2	—		2	0	0	0	5	0	1 (Note: Appearance in FA Community Shield)	0	33	2
Manchester City	2015–16	Premier League	24	2	—		3	0	5	0	10	0	—		42	2
Manchester City	2016–17	Premier League	15	0	—		4	0	2	0	6	0	—		27	0
Manchester City	Total		64	4	—		9	0	7	0	21	0	1	0	102	4
Galatasaray	2017–18	Süper Lig	25	2	—		1	0	—		0	0	—		26	2
Galatasaray	2018–19	Süper Lig	22	2	—		4	0	—		5 (Note: Four appearances in UEFA Champions League, one appearance in UEFA Europa League)	0	1 (Note: Appearance in Turkish Super Cup)	0	32	2
Galatasaray	Total		47	4	—		5	0	—		5	0	1	0	58	4
Sevilla	2019–20	La Liga	34	2	—		1	1	—		7	0	—		42	3
Sevilla	2020–21	La Liga	31	3	—		5	0	—		7	0	1	0	44	3
Sevilla	2021–22	La Liga	24	1	—		0	0	—		8 (Note: Six appearances in UEFA Champions League, two appearances in UEFA Europa League)	0	—		32	1
Sevilla	2022–23	La Liga	22	0	—		4	0	—		10 (Note: One appearance in UEFA Champions League, nine appearances in UEFA Europa League)	0	—		36	0
Sevilla	2023–24	La Liga	8	0	—		1	0	—		4	0	0	0	13	0
Sevilla	Total		119	6	—		11	1	—		36	0	1	0	167	7
Vila Nova	2024	Série B	—		6	0	—		—		—		—		6	0
Internacional	2024	Série A	23	1	0	0	3	0	—		4 (Note: Appearances in Copa Sudamericana)	0	—		30	1
Career total			421	18	6	0	51	2	24	2	121	1	8	0	631	23

== Honours ==
Vila Nova

- Campeonato Goiano: 2005

Porto

- Primeira Liga: 2008–09, 2010–11, 2011–12, 2012–13
- Taça de Portugal: 2008–09, 2009–10, 2010–11
- Supertaça Cândido de Oliveira: 2009, 2010, 2012, 2013
- UEFA Europa League: 2010–11

Manchester City

- Football League Cup: 2015–16

Galatasaray

- Süper Lig: 2017–18, 2018–19
- Turkish Cup: 2018–19

Sevilla

- UEFA Europa League: 2019–20, 2022–23

Internacional

- Campeonato Gaúcho: 2025

Brazil U20

- South American Youth Championship: 2007

Individual

- La Liga Player of the Month: April 2021
