= Wilfried Bony =

Ivorian footballer (born 1988)

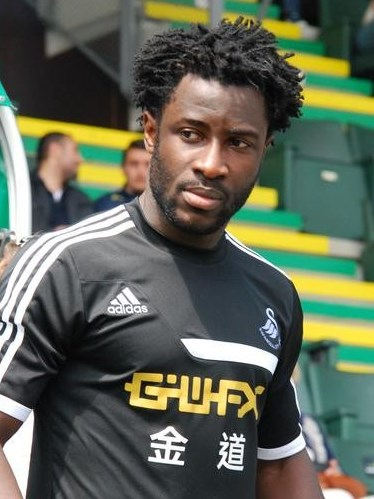
- Bony with Swansea City in 2013

Personal information
- Full name: Wilfried Guemiand Bony
- Date of birth: 10 December 1988 (age 37)
- Place of birth: Bingerville, Ivory Coast
- Height: 1.82 m (6 ft 0 in)
- Position: Striker

Youth career
- 2000–2002: Maracanã Bingerville
- 2002–2005: Cyril Domoraud Academy

Senior career*
Years	Team	Apps	(Gls)
2006–2008	Issia Wazy		
2007–2008	→ Sparta Prague B (loan)	14	(2)
2008–2011	Sparta Prague	59	(22)
2011–2013	Vitesse Arnhem	65	(46)
2013–2015	Swansea City	54	(25)
2015–2017	Manchester City	36	(6)
2016–2017	→ Stoke City (loan)	10	(2)
2017–2019	Swansea City	22	(3)
2019	→ Al-Arabi (loan)	7	(5)
2020	Al-Ittihad	10	(5)
2022	NEC Nijmegen	1	(0)
2023	Always Ready	0	(0)
Total		278	(116)

International career^{‡}
2010–2019	Ivory Coast	56	(16)
Medal record
Representing Ivory Coast
Men's football
Africa Cup of Nations
Runner-up	2012
Winner	2015
- * Club domestic league appearances and goals as of 15 May 2022 ‡ National team caps and goals as of 12:26, 14 July 2019 (UTC)

Wilfried Guemiand Bony (born 10 December 1988) is an Ivorian former professional footballer who played as a striker.

Having begun his career at Issia Wazy, Bony moved to Sparta Prague in 2007, helping them to the Czech First League title in 2009–10. In January 2011, he was signed by Dutch club Vitesse, where he was the top scorer in the Eredivisie in 2012–13, leading to a £12 million transfer to Premier League club Swansea City. Bony scored 35 goals in 70 appearances for the Swans and in January 2015, joined Manchester City in a £28 million deal. However, he struggled for match-time, and following the arrival of Pep Guardiola in mid-2016, he joined Stoke City on loan for the 2016–17 season. Bony returned to Swansea in August 2017. After his loan spell with Al-Arabi, he was released by Swansea in May 2019 to leave on 30 June. In 2020, he signed a contract with Al-Ittihad, but in a mutual agreement with the club he left after playing ten games in the ten months with the team.

Internationally, Bony made his debut for Ivory Coast, in 2010, and was selected in the squads for the 2014 FIFA World Cup and three Africa Cup of Nations tournaments, helping them to victory in 2015.

== Early life ==
Wilfried Bony was born in Bingerville and played street football from a young age, later playing at the Maracanã Bingerville football school. He also participated in many interschool and city cups, before spending three years at the Cyril Domoraud Academy in Bingerville.

== Club career ==
=== Issia Wazy ===
Bony began his professional career at Issia Wazy in the Ivorian top flight and ended the 2007 season as top goalscorer.

=== Sparta Prague ===
Bony had a two-week trial at Premier League club Liverpool in 2007 but was not offered a contract. In October 2007, Bony joined Czech club Sparta Prague on a loan deal where he immediately started playing for their B team. He won the Bohemian Football League championship with Sparta Prague B. Bony then joined the club on a permanent basis and broke into the first team in the 2008–09 season, scoring 3 goals in 16 appearances. In 2009–10, he scored nine times as Sparta won the Czech First League title. After scoring 17 goals during the first half of the 2010–11 season, including five goals in six appearances in the UEFA Europa League, Bony was signed by Dutch Eredivisie club Vitesse in January 2011 for a £3.4 million transfer fee.

=== Vitesse Arnhem ===
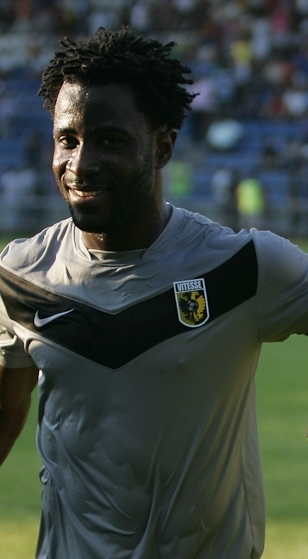
Bony playing for Vitesse Arnhem in August 2012

Bony signed a three-and-a-half-year contract with Vitesse and scored on his debut in a 2–0 derby win over De Graafschap on 20 February 2011. In his first full season with Vitesse, Bony scored 12 goals in the Eredivisie, earning the top goalscoring honours for the club and was tied for tenth-highest scorer in the league. In February 2012, he signed a contract extension which would have kept him at the club until 2015, also ending transfer speculation.

Bony made his first appearance of the 2012–13 Eredivisie campaign for Vitesse on 12 August 2012 in a 2–2 draw with ADO Den Haag at the GelreDome, equalizing for the hosts less than a minute after Tjaronn Chery had put ADO in front. Bony then scored a 90th-minute winner over Feyenoord on 2 September to earn the club its third win from its first four league matches. On 6 October, he scored a hat-trick as Vitesse came back from a goal down three times to draw 3–3 with Heerenveen.

During Vitesse's 2–0 upset of Ajax on 4 November, Bony scored both goals, helping Vitesse to six away wins in a row and the club's first win at the Amsterdam Arena since 2001. He added two more goals to his account in Vitesse's 4–1 defeat of NEC on 18 November, earning Vitesse just their second home win of the season as NEC had three players sent off. On 25 November, Vitesse travelled to Eindhoven to face league leaders PSV; Bony scored a late winner to put Vitesse on 31 points, level with second-placed Twente.

On 9 February 2013, Bony returned from his participation in the 2013 Africa Cup of Nations to face PSV and once again scored twice, securing a 2–2 draw. On 23 February, Bony scored a hat-trick to send Vitesse to a 5–3 victory over Heracles Almelo. On 15 April, he scored for the ninth consecutive match in a 3–3 draw with Roda JC. Bony ended the season as the Eredivisie's top scorer with 31 goals in 30 matches and was awarded the Golden Shoe for the best player in the Netherlands.

=== Swansea City ===
On 11 July 2013, Bony signed a four-year contract with Welsh side Swansea City, who paid a Welsh record transfer fee of £12 million. Bony's work permit was delayed briefly, but was granted three days later. He made his competitive debut for Swansea in the club's UEFA Europa League third qualifying round tie against Malmö FF, scoring two second-half goals in a 4–0 first-leg victory on 1 August.

The BBC listed Bony as one of the Premier League signings to watch for the 2013–14 Premier League. In the opening match of the 2013–14 season on 17 August, Bony scored his first goal for the club in a 1–4 loss against Manchester United. Shortly after, Bony scored his first goal for Swansea in a UEFA competition, in the first leg of the Europa League qualification round against Romanian side Petrolul Ploiești in a 5–1 win. He then scored a brace in Swansea's 3–3 draw with Stoke City in November. In the third round of the FA Cup, Bony scored a 90th-minute header against Manchester United to send Swansea through to the next round in what was Swansea's first-ever win at Old Trafford. After scoring in a 3–1 win at Sunderland on the final day of the Premier League season, he finished 2013–14 having scored 25 goals.

On 20 September 2014, Bony was sent off in the first half of a 1–0 home defeat to Southampton. He scored his first goal of the season on 4 October in a 2–2 draw against Newcastle United. On 25 October, Bony scored both goals as Swansea defeated Leicester City 2–0, taking him to a total of 20 Premier League goals for Swansea, drawing him level alongside former teammate Michu as the club's all-time leading Premier League goalscorer. With 20 goals, Bony was the Premier League's top scorer in the calendar year of 2014.

=== Manchester City ===
On 14 January 2015, Bony signed a four-and-a-half-year deal with fellow Premier League club Manchester City. The two teams agreed an initial transfer fee of £25 million, which could rise to £28 million, which would then make him the most expensive African footballer at that time. Bony was included in his new club's squad for the knockout stages of the UEFA Champions League, at the expense of Stevan Jovetić.

After winning the 2015 Africa Cup of Nations, Bony made his Manchester City debut on 21 February, replacing Sergio Agüero for the last 30 minutes of a 5–0 win over Newcastle United at the City of Manchester Stadium. On 21 March 2015, Bony registered his first league goal with City in a 3–0 home win over West Bromwich Albion, scoring the first of the team's three goals. He scored his second goal for the club as a late substitute in a 4–2 win at his former club Swansea on 17 May.

In the middle of 2015, Bony contracted malaria, which hampered his pre-season preparations. Bony was selected to start in Manchester City's opening match of the 2015–16 Premier League season, away to West Brom. He was on the pitch for 63 minutes before being substituted for Sergio Agüero as the team won 3–0 at The Hawthorns. On 17 October 2015, Bony scored his first two goals of the season as Manchester City defeated AFC Bournemouth 5–1 at the City of Manchester Stadium. He followed this up with his first Champions League goal in a 3–1 away victory against Sevilla on 3 November 2015.

On 8 December, Bony appeared as a 65th-minute substitute for Fabian Delph in City's final fixture of the Champions League group stage, against Borussia Mönchengladbach. He helped turn a 2–1 deficit into a 4–2 win, assisting two goals for Raheem Sterling before scoring the fourth goal, ensuring City overtook Juventus in the group standings. In the 2016 Football League Cup Final he came on as a substitute as Manchester City defeated Liverpool on penalties. Bony scored 8 goals in 34 appearances in 2015–16. Following the arrival of Pep Guardiola as manager, Bony was made available for transfer.

==== Loan to Stoke City ====
On 31 August 2016, Bony signed for Stoke City on a season-long loan deal. He made his debut for Stoke on 10 September against Tottenham Hotspur. After going seven matches without a goal, he scored twice in a 3–1 victory over Swansea on 31 October. In January 2017, Bony went away to play for Ivory Coast in the 2017 Africa Cup of Nations; he also turned down a transfer to a Chinese club. On his return to Stoke, Bony was omitted from the squad by manager Mark Hughes, which Bony described as a "crazy situation".

=== Return to Swansea ===
However, on 31 August 2017, Bony re-signed for Swansea City on a two-year deal, with Swansea paying a £12 million transfer fee. He assumed the number 2 shirt. Bony scored his first Premier League goal of the season against his former club Stoke City on 2 December 2017. A week later, he captained Swansea to a 1–0 win against West Bromwich Albion, scoring his first home goal at the Liberty Stadium since leaving the club. After that, both the player and the club struggled for goalscoring form. His last match in a Swansea shirt was in a 1–1 draw away to Leicester when he sustained an ankle injury. The club were relegated from the Premier League after a 2–1 defeat against his former and already-relegated side Stoke City. He moved on loan to Qatari side Al-Arabi in January 2019.

Swansea confirmed on 18 May 2019 that he would be released upon expiration of his contract. After being released by Swansea, he began training with Newport County in August 2019.

=== Al-Ittihad ===
On 28 January 2020, Al-Ittihad signed Bony to a one-and-a-half-year contract.

On 1 November, Bony announced on his Instagram account that he and the club had come a mutual agreement to terminate his contract after 10 months at the club.

=== NEC Nijmegen ===
On 26 January 2022, after being without a club for over a year, Bony returned to the Netherlands to join Eredivisie club NEC Nijmegen on a deal until the end of the season. He only made one 15-minute substitute appearance for NEC and was unavailable due to injuries in most of the league games.

=== Always Ready ===
On 11 February 2023, Bony signed for Bolivian Primera División club Club Always Ready, becoming the first Ivorian to play professionally in Bolivia.

== International career ==
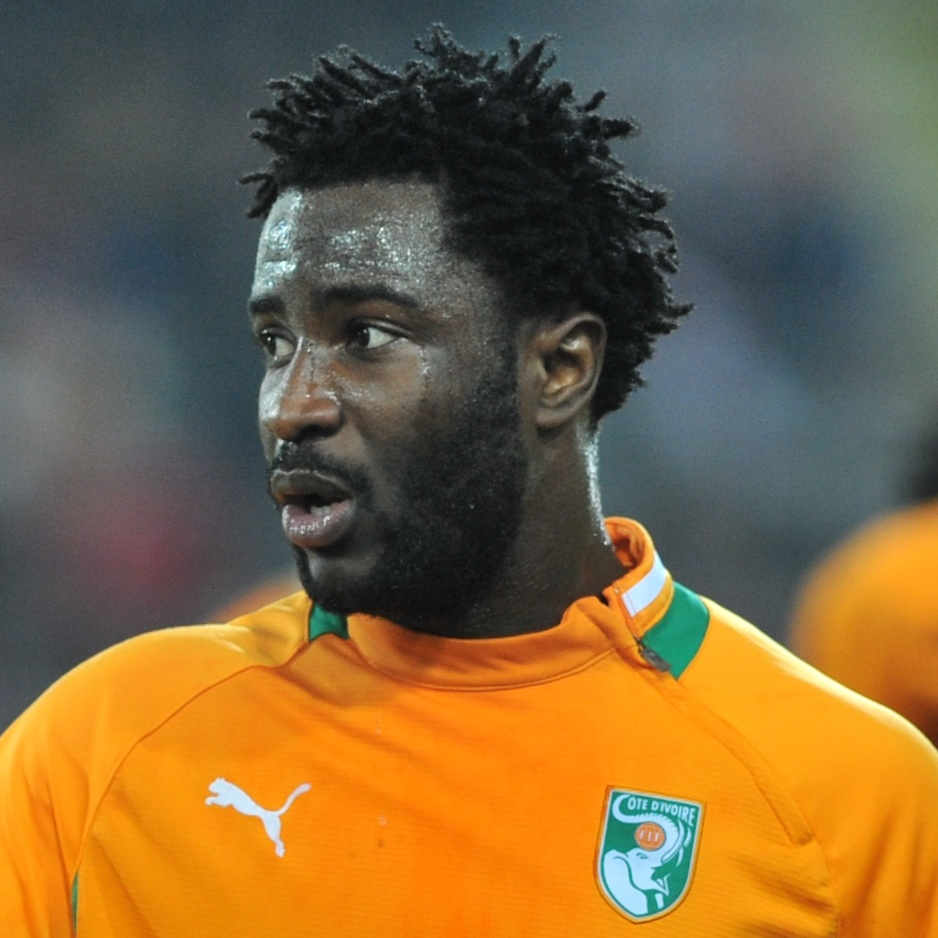
Bony with the Ivory Coast, November 2012

In late 2010, Bony was called up by Ivory Coast and made his debut in a 1–0 away victory against Burundi, where he came on as a substitute in the 80th minutes for Gervinho.

=== 2012 Africa Cup of Nations ===
On 30 January 2012, Bony scored the second goal in the Ivory Coast's 2–0 win over Angola in the third game of the group stages of the African Cup of Nations.

=== 2014 FIFA World Cup ===
Bony was included in the Ivory Coast's 23-man squad for the 2014 FIFA World Cup. In their first group match, against Japan, he scored the equalising goal with a header after a cross from Serge Aurier. Ivory Coast eventually won 2–1. Against Greece in the final match of the group stages, Bony came on as a substitute in the second half to score the equalising goal before the Ivory Coast lost via an injury time penalty.

=== 2015 Africa Cup of Nations ===
In a quarter-final 3–1 win over Algeria, Bony scored two headers, one from a Max Gradel cross and the second from a Yaya Touré free-kick. In the final's penalty shoot-out, he took the Ivory Coast's first attempt and hit the crossbar, although his team eventually triumphed.

== Personal life ==
Bony's father's name is Amedee Shemiz Bony. Wilfried Bony speaks fluent French, English and Czech. Wilfried's son Geoffroy Bony is a professional footballer with EFL League Two club Newport County and his younger son Orphee Bony is a player with Pontardawe Town A.F.C. In August 2026, Bony commented on Yan Diomandé's move to Real Madrid, describing the seven-year contract signed by the 19-year-old Ivorian as the pinnacle of a footballer's career and highlighting the significance of the transfer for his compatriot.

== Career statistics ==
=== Club ===
As of match played 9 September 2020

Appearances and goals by club, season and competition
Club	Season	League			National cup (Note: Includes Czech Cup, KNVB Cup, FA Cup)		League cup (Note: Includes Football League Cup)		Europe		Other		Total	
Club	Season	Division	Apps	Goals	Apps	Goals	Apps	Goals	Apps	Goals	Apps	Goals	Apps	Goals
Sparta Prague B	2007–08	Bohemian Football League	14	2	—		—		—		—		14	2
Sparta Prague	2008–09	Czech First League	16	3	0	0	—		0	0	—		16	3
Sparta Prague	2009–10	Czech First League	29	9	2	0	—		6	1	—		37	10
Sparta Prague	2010–11	Czech First League	14	10	0	0	—		10	7	—		24	17
Sparta Prague	Total		59	22	2	0	0	0	16	8	0	0	77	30
Vitesse Arnhem	2010–11	Eredivisie	7	3	0	0	—		0	0	—		7	3
Vitesse Arnhem	2011–12	Eredivisie	28	12	2	1	—		0	0	4	5	34	18
Vitesse Arnhem	2012–13	Eredivisie	30	31	2	4	—		4	2	—		36	37
Vitesse Arnhem	Total		65	46	4	5	0	0	4	2	4	5	77	58
Swansea City	2013–14	Premier League	34	16	2	3	1	1	11 (Note: Appearances in UEFA Europa League)	5	—		48	25
Swansea City	2014–15	Premier League	20	9	0	0	2	0	—		—		22	9
Swansea City	Total		54	25	2	3	3	1	11	5	0	0	70	34
Manchester City	2014–15	Premier League	10	2	0	0	0	0	2 (Note: Appearances in UEFA Champions League)	0	—		12	2
Manchester City	2015–16	Premier League	26	4	0	0	3	2	5	2	—		34	8
Manchester City	Total		36	6	0	0	3	2	7	2	0	0	46	10
Stoke City (loan)	2016–17	Premier League	10	2	0	0	1	0	—		—		11	2
Swansea City	2017–18	Premier League	15	2	2	1	1	0	—		—		18	3
Swansea City	2018–19	Championship	7	1	0	0	0	0	—		—		7	1
Swansea City	Total		22	3	2	1	1	0	0	0	0	0	25	4
Al-Arabi (loan)	2018–19	Qatar Stars League	7	5	0	0	0	0	—		—		7	5
Al-Ittihad	2019–20	Saudi Pro League	10	5	0	0	—		0	0	1 (Note: Appearance in Arab Club Champions Cup)	0	11	5
Club total			277	116	10	9	8	3	38	17	5	5	337	150

=== International ===
As of match played 14 July 2019

Appearances and goals by national team and year
National team	Year	Apps	Goals
Ivory Coast	2010	2	0
Ivory Coast	2011	5	3
Ivory Coast	2012	8	1
Ivory Coast	2013	7	4
Ivory Coast	2014	10	3
Ivory Coast	2015	10	2
Ivory Coast	2016	4	0
Ivory Coast	2017	4	1
Ivory Coast	2018	0	0
Ivory Coast	2019	6	2
Total		56	16

Scores and results list Ivory Coast's goal tally first, score column indicates score after each Bony goal.

List of international goals scored by Wilfried Bony
No.	Date	Venue	Opponent	Score	Result	Competition
1	5 June 2011	Stade de l'Amitie, Cotonou, Benin	Benin	6–2	6–2	2012 Africa Cup of Nations qualification
2	3 September 2011	Stade Amahoro, Kigali, Rwanda	Rwanda	2–0	5–0	2012 Africa Cup of Nations qualification
3	3 September 2011	Stade Amahoro, Kigali, Rwanda	Rwanda	3–0	5–0	2012 Africa Cup of Nations qualification
4	30 January 2012	Estadio de Malabo, Malabo, Equatorial Guinea	Angola	2–0	2–0	2012 Africa Cup of Nations
5	30 January 2013	Royal Bafokeng Stadium, Rustenburg, South Africa	Algeria	2–2	2–2	2013 Africa Cup of Nations
6	23 March 2013	Stade Félix Houphouët-Boigny, Abidjan, Ivory Coast	Gambia	1–0	3–0	2014 FIFA World Cup qualification
7	8 June 2013	Independence Stadium, Bakau, The Gambia	Gambia	2–0	3–0	2014 FIFA World Cup qualification
8	16 June 2013	Benjamin Mkapa National Stadium, Dar es Salaam, Tanzania	Tanzania	4–2	4–2	2014 FIFA World Cup qualification
9	14 June 2014	Itaipava Arena Pernambuco, Recife, Brazil	Japan	1–1	2–1	2014 FIFA World Cup
10	24 June 2014	Estádio Castelão, Fortaleza, Brazil	Greece	1–1	1–2	2014 FIFA World Cup
11	11 October 2014	Stade des Martyrs, Kinshasa, DR Congo	DR Congo	1–0	2–1	2015 Africa Cup of Nations qualification
12	1 February 2015	Estadio de Malabo, Malabo, Equatorial Guinea	Algeria	1–0	3–1	2015 Africa Cup of Nations
13	1 February 2015	Estadio de Malabo, Malabo, Equatorial Guinea	Algeria	2–1	3–1	2015 Africa Cup of Nations
14	20 January 2017	Stade d'Oyem, Oyem, Gabon	DR Congo	1–1	2–2	2017 Africa Cup of Nations
15	7 June 2019	Stade de la Libération, Boulogne-sur-Mer, France	Comoros	1–0	3–1	Friendly
16	7 June 2019	Stade de la Libération, Boulogne-sur-Mer, France	Comoros	2–0	3–1	Friendly

== Honours ==
Sparta Prague

- Czech First League: 2009–10

Manchester City

- Football League Cup: 2015–16

Ivory Coast

- Africa Cup of Nations: 2015

Individual

- Eredivisie top scorer: 2012–13
- Dutch Footballer of the Year: 2012–13
- Swansea City Player of the Year: 2013–14
- Africa Cup of Nations Team of the Tournament: 2015
