= 2016 Football League Cup final =

- Match programme cover
- Event: 2015–16 Football League Cup
Liverpool	Manchester City
1	1
- After extra time Manchester City won 3–1 on penalties
- Date: 28 February 2016
- Venue: Wembley Stadium, London
- Man of the Match: Vincent Kompany (Manchester City)
- Referee: Michael Oliver (Northumberland)
- Attendance: 86,206

The 2016 Football League Cup final was a football match played at Wembley Stadium, London, on 28 February 2016 to determine the winner of the 2015–16 Football League Cup, the 56th edition of the Football League Cup, a competition for the 92 teams in the Premier League and Football League. It was contested by Liverpool and Manchester City, with Manchester City winning 3–1 in a penalty shoot-out after the match had finished 1–1 after extra time. They would have qualified for the Third Qualifying Round of the 2016–17 UEFA Europa League, but they ultimately qualified for the 2016–17 UEFA Champions League instead by virtue of their league position.

== Background ==
Liverpool were participating in a record 12th League Cup final, having previously won a record eight, most recently in 2012 against Cardiff City. Their last loss was in 2005 to Chelsea.

Manchester City made their fifth appearance in the final, having won three previous times, the last of which as recently as 2014 against Sunderland.

== Route to the final ==
=== Liverpool ===
Round	Opponents	Score
3	Carlisle United (H)	1–1 (3–2 pen)
4	AFC Bournemouth (H)	1–0
5	Southampton (A)	1-6
SF	Stoke City (A)	0-1
SF	Stoke City (H)	0–1 (6–5 pen)

Liverpool, as a Premier League team involved in the 2015–16 UEFA Europa League, started the competition in the third round. In this they were drawn against Football League Two team Carlisle United, at their home ground, Anfield. After extra time the score was 1–1 but Liverpool advanced after a 3–2 penalty shoot out win. In the fourth round they were drawn at home again, this time against fellow Premier League team AFC Bournemouth; they won the game 1–0 after Nathaniel Clyne's debut goal for Liverpool.

In the quarter finals, they were drawn away to fellow Premier League team Southampton. At St. Mary's Stadium, Liverpool won 6–1 with a hat-trick from Divock Origi, two goals from Daniel Sturridge and one from Jordon Ibe. In the two-legged semi-final, Liverpool were drawn against Stoke City. At the Britannia Stadium, Liverpool won the first leg 1–0 due to a goal from Ibe. However, they lost the second leg 1–0 at Anfield, their first home loss in a League Cup semi-final, necessitating a penalty shoot out which Liverpool won 6–5; goalkeeper Simon Mignolet saved from Peter Crouch and Marc Muniesa with Joe Allen scoring the winner.

=== Manchester City ===
Round	Opponents	Score
3	Sunderland (A)	1-4
4	Crystal Palace (H)	5–1
5	Hull City (H)	4–1
SF	Everton (A)	1-2
SF	Everton (H)	3–1

Manchester City, as a Premier League team involved in the 2015–16 UEFA Champions League, started in the third round, in which they were drawn away against Sunderland. At the Stadium of Light, Manchester City won 4–1 with goals from Sergio Agüero, Kevin De Bruyne, Raheem Sterling and an own goal from Vito Mannone. In the next round they were drawn at home against Crystal Palace. At the City of Manchester Stadium, Manchester City won 5–1 with goals from Wilfried Bony, De Bruyne, Kelechi Iheanacho, Yaya Touré and Manu García.

In the quarter-finals, they were drawn against Hull City at home, where they won 4–1 with goals from Bony, Iheanacho and two from De Bruyne. In the semi-finals, they were drawn against Everton where despite losing 2–1 at Goodison Park, Manchester City won 3–1 at the City of Manchester Stadium, which included a controversial goal as Raheem Sterling failed to keep the ball from crossing the dead ball line, but the officials missed it and allowed the goal to stand thus reaching the final 4–3 on aggregate and also preventing a Merseyside derby final.

== Match ==
=== Summary ===
In the 49th minute Fernandinho opened the scoring for Man City with a low shot from a tight angle on the right of the box that went into the far corner under Liverpool goalkeeper Simon Mignolet. In the 60th minute Raheem Sterling had a chance to make it 2-0 but he passed the ball wide of the near post from six yards out. In the 83rd minute, Daniel Sturridge drilled the ball in from the right beyond the far post, the ball came to Adam Lallana whose shot hit the face of the near post with the ball coming back to Philippe Coutinho, who scored with a low right foot shot from 12 yards out. There were no more goals in the 90 minutes or in the 30 minutes of extra-time with the match going to a penalty shoot-out. Emre Can scored the first penalty of the shoot-out for Liverpool before Fernandinho missed the first spot-kick for Man City, hitting the post. Lucas Leiva then missed the next kick for Liverpool, with Willy Caballero diving to his left to save. Jesús Navas then scored with his kick before Philippe Coutinho missed with the next kick for Liverpool, Caballero saving again to his left. Sergio Agüero then scored before Caballero dived to his right to save from Adam Lallana. Yaya Touré scored with a low shot to the left to win the game for Man City 3-1 on penalties.

=== Details ===
28 February 2016
16:30 GMT

Liverpool	1–1 (a.e.t.)	Manchester City
Coutinho 83'	Report	Fernandinho 49'
Penalties
Can (penalty scored); Lucas (penalty missed); Coutinho (penalty missed); Lallana (penalty missed)	1–3	(penalty missed) Fernandinho; (penalty scored) Navas; (penalty scored) Agüero; (penalty scored) Touré

Wembley Stadium, London
Attendance: 86,206
Referee: Michael Oliver

Liverpool	Manchester City

GK	22	(Belgium) Simon Mignolet
RB	2	(England) Nathaniel Clyne	(yellow card) 53'
CB	21	(Brazil) Lucas Leiva
CB	17	(France) Mamadou Sakho		(substituted off) 25'
LB	18	(Spain) Alberto Moreno	(yellow card) 65'	(substituted off) 72'
DM	23	(Germany) Emre Can	(yellow card) 85'
CM	14	(England) Jordan Henderson (c)
CM	7	(England) James Milner
AM	10	(Brazil) Philippe Coutinho	(yellow card) 83'
CF	11	(Brazil) Roberto Firmino		(substituted off) 80'
CF	15	(England) Daniel Sturridge
Substitutes:
GK	34	(Hungary) Ádám Bogdán
DF	4	(Ivory Coast) Kolo Touré		(substituted on) 25'
DF	38	(England) Jon Flanagan
MF	20	(England) Adam Lallana	(yellow card) 118'	(substituted on) 72'
MF	24	(Wales) Joe Allen
FW	9	(Belgium) Christian Benteke
FW	27	(Belgium) Divock Origi		(substituted on) 80'
Manager:
(Germany) Jürgen Klopp

GK	13	(Argentina) Willy Caballero
RB	3	(France) Bacary Sagna		(substituted off) 90'
CB	4	(Belgium) Vincent Kompany (c)	(yellow card) 87'
CB	30	(Argentina) Nicolás Otamendi	(yellow card) 109'
LB	22	(France) Gaël Clichy
DM	25	(Brazil) Fernandinho	(yellow card) 119'
DM	6	(Brazil) Fernando	(yellow card) 76'	(substituted off) 90'
CM	42	(Ivory Coast) Yaya Touré	(yellow card) 118'
RF	21	(Spain) David Silva		(substituted off) 110'
CF	10	(Argentina) Sergio Agüero
LF	7	(England) Raheem Sterling
Substitutes:
GK	1	(England) Joe Hart
DF	5	(Argentina) Pablo Zabaleta		(substituted on) 90'
DF	11	(Serbia) Aleksandar Kolarov
DF	26	(Argentina) Martín Demichelis
MF	15	(Spain) Jesús Navas		(substituted on) 90'
FW	14	(Ivory Coast) Wilfried Bony		(substituted on) 110'
FW	72	(Nigeria) Kelechi Iheanacho
Manager:
(Chile) Manuel Pellegrini

== Post-match ==
In winning, Manchester City qualified for the Third Qualifying Round of the 2016–17 UEFA Europa League; however, they subsequently qualified for the 2016–17 UEFA Champions League via their league position. The vacant UEFA Europa League berth was instead allocated to the club ranked highest in the 2015–16 Premier League that had not already qualified for Europe, which was seventh-placed West Ham United.

== See also ==
- 2016 FA Cup final
