= 2012–13 Manchester City F.C. season =

English football club season

Manchester City
2012–13 season
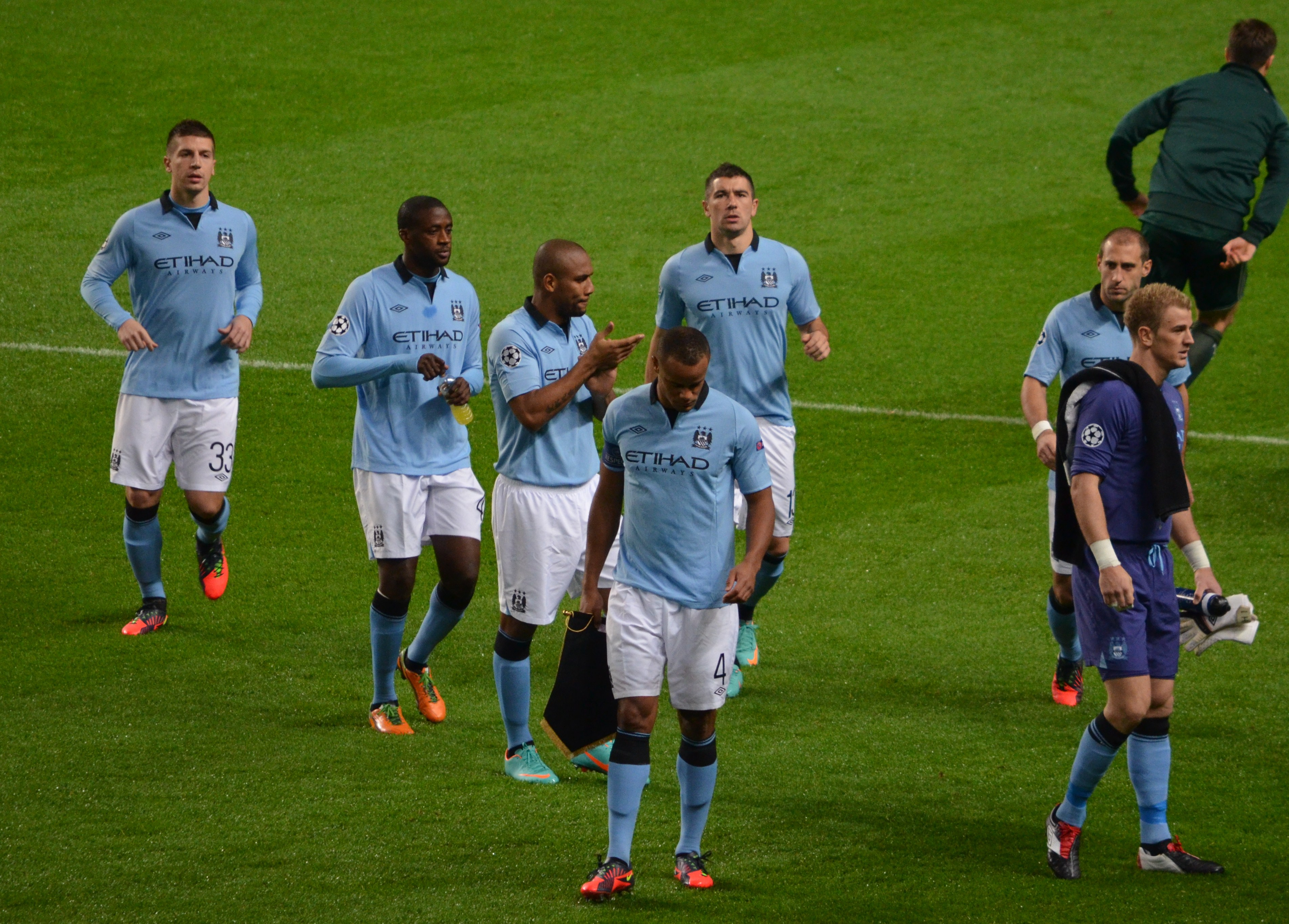
- Manchester City players during a UEFA Champions League match against Real Madrid in November 2012
- Owner: Abu Dhabi United Group
- Chairman: Khaldoon Al Mubarak
- Manager: Roberto Mancini (until 13 May 2013); Brian Kidd (caretaker manager, from 13 May 2013)
- Stadium: Etihad Stadium
- Premier League: 2nd
- FA Cup: Runners-up
- League Cup: Third round
- FA Community Shield: Winners
- UEFA Champions League: Group stage
- Top goalscorer: League: Edin Džeko (14); All: Sergio Agüero; Carlos Tevez (17 each)
- Highest home attendance: 47,386 vs. Everton (1 Dec 2012, Premier League)
- Lowest home attendance: 28,015 vs. Aston Villa (25 Sep 2012, League Cup)
- Average home league attendance: 45,781 (in all competitions)
Home colours	Away colours	Third colours

The 2012–13 season was Manchester City Football Club's 111th season of competitive football, 84th season in the top flight of English football and 16th season in the Premier League.

== Season summary ==
Manchester City began the season as defending champions, clinching their first Premier League title and third top-flight title overall after a dramatic win on the final day of the previous season.

In the Premier League, they finished 11 points behind champions and local rivals Manchester United and were eliminated from the League Cup in the third round by Aston Villa. The club played in the UEFA Champions League for the third time and only the second since the competition was rebranded in 1992, and were drawn in a group with Borussia Dortmund, Real Madrid and Ajax. Quickly labelled the "group of death", City went winless in the group – recording three draws and three defeats – and finished bottom, failing to advance either to the knockout stages or the Europa League.

On 14 April 2013, Manchester City defeated holders Chelsea in the FA Cup semi-finals and reached the final where they would face relegated Wigan Athletic. It was City's tenth final appearance and second in three years (after their triumph over Stoke City in 2011). The final was played on 11 May, where City suffered a shock 1–0 defeat at the hands of the Latics due to a late goal from Ben Watson. Pablo Zabaleta was sent off after receiving a second yellow card, making him only the third player to be dismissed in a final. As a result, City ended their season without any silverware, with the exception of the Community Shield at the beginning of the season.

On 13 May 2013, two days after the FA Cup final defeat, and exactly a year to the day since winning the Premier League title the season before, Roberto Mancini was sacked from his role as manager after a three-and-a-half-year tenure, with Manchester City stating that he had "failed to achieve any of the club's targets, with the exception of qualification for next season's Champions League". His assistant, Brian Kidd, took charge until the end of the season.

== Kits ==
Supplier: Umbro / Sponsor: Etihad Airways

Home	Away	Third	Goalkeeper 1	Goalkeeper 2	Goalkeeper 2 alt.	Goalkeeper 3	Goalkeeper 3 alt.

=== Kit information ===
Umbro made their last kits for Manchester City this season, following Umbro sales to Iconix Brand Group, Nike, produced new kits for Manchester City from next season.

- Home: The home kit featured black trimmings, inspired by Manchester City's first ever home kit when it became known as West Gorton in 1884.
- Away: The away kit was officially called "zinfandel", an attractive shade of maroon with golden trimmings.
- Third: The third kit was black with shadow stripes and sky blue accents.
- Keeper: The three goalkeeper kits were green, purple and yellow.

== Non-competitive ==
=== Pre-season ===
==== Friendlies ====
13 July 2012	Al-Hilal	1–0	Manchester City	Innsbruck, Austria
19:00 CEST (UTC+02:00)	Al Abed 69'	Report		Stadium: Tivoli-Neu; Referee: Michael Daxauer (Austria)

17 July 2012	Dynamo Dresden	0–0	Manchester City	Innsbruck, Austria
19:00 CEST (UTC+02:00)		Report		Stadium: Tivoli-Neu; Attendance: 4,650; Referee: Gregor Danler (Austria)

20 July 2012	Beşiktaş	0–2	Manchester City	Innsbruck, Austria
18:30 CEST (UTC+02:00)		Report	Agüero 45'; Kompany 56'	Stadium: Tivoli-Neu

30 July 2012	Malaysia XI	1–3	Manchester City	Kuala Lumpur, Malaysia
	Azamuddin 87'	Report	Agüero 25'; Tevez 47'; Johnson 51'	Stadium: Bukit Jalil Stadium; Attendance: 53,000

4 August 2012	VfL Wolfsburg	0–2	Manchester City	Wolfsburg, Germany
		Report	Agüero 41'; Y. Touré 57'	Stadium: Volkswagen Arena; Attendance: 22,000

5 August 2012	Limerick	0–4	Manchester City	Limerick, Ireland
19:00 BST		Report	Džeko 33', 44'; Boyata 42'; Scapuzzi 78'	Stadium: Thomond Park

==== China Cup ====
27 July 2012	Arsenal	0–2	Manchester City	Beijing, China
20:00 CST (UTC+08:00)		Report	Zabaleta 42'; Y. Touré 44'	Stadium: Bird's Nest Stadium; Attendance: 52,000; Referee: Howard Webb (South Yorkshire)

=== Post-season ===
==== Friendlies ====
23 May 2013	Manchester City	4–3	Chelsea	St Louis, Missouri, United States
19:30 CT (UTC−06:00)	García 63'; Džeko 64', 84'; Richards 90+1'	Report	Ba 14'; Azpilicueta 45' (pen.); Oscar 53'	Stadium: Busch Stadium; Attendance: 48,263; Referee: George Gansner

25 May 2013	Manchester City	5–3	Chelsea	New York City, New York, United States
17:30 EST (UTC−05:00)	Barry 3'; Nasri 29', 74'; Milner 55'; Džeko 84'		Ramires 46', 69'; Mata 82'	Stadium: Yankee Stadium; Attendance: 39,462

== Competitions ==
=== Overall ===
Competition	Started round	Final position / round	First match	Last match
FA Community Shield	Final	Winners	12 August 2012	
Premier League	—	Runners-up	19 August 2012	19 May 2013
League Cup	Third round	Third round	25 September 2012	
FA Cup	Third round	Runners-up	5 January 2013	11 May 2013
UEFA Champions League	Group stage	Group stage	18 September 2012	4 December 2012

Updated to match played 19 May 2013
Source: Competitions

=== FA Community Shield ===
12 August 2012	Chelsea	2–3	Manchester City	Birmingham
13:30 BST	Torres 40'; Bertrand 80'; Ivanović (red card) 42'	Report	Y. Touré 52'; Tevez 59'; Nasri 64'	Stadium: Villa Park; Attendance: 36,394; Referee: Kevin Friend (Leicestershire)

=== Premier League ===
==== League table ====
Pos	Team	Pld	W	D	L	GF	GA	GD	Pts	Qualification or relegation
1	Manchester United (C)	38	28	5	5	86	43	+43	89	Qualification for the Champions League group stage
2	Manchester City	38	23	9	6	66	34	+32	78	Qualification for the Champions League group stage
3	Chelsea	38	22	9	7	75	39	+36	75	Qualification for the Champions League group stage
4	Arsenal	38	21	10	7	72	37	+35	73	Qualification for the Champions League play-off round
5	Tottenham Hotspur	38	21	9	8	66	46	+20	72	Qualification for the Europa League play-off round

Source: Barclays Premier League
Rules for classification: 1) Points; 2) Goal difference; 3) Goals scored; 4) Play-offs (only if needed to decide champion, teams for relegation or teams for UEFA competitions).
(C) Champions

==== Results summary ====
Overall								Home						Away					
Pld	W	D	L	GF	GA	GD	Pts	W	D	L	GF	GA	GD	W	D	L	GF	GA	GD
38	23	9	6	66	34	+32	78	14	3	2	41	15	+26	9	6	4	25	19	+6

Last updated: 19 May 2013.
Source: Premier League

==== Points breakdown ====
Points at home: 45
Points away from home: 33

Points against 2011–12 Top Four: 10
Points against promoted teams: 13

6 points: Aston Villa, Fulham, Newcastle United, Reading, West Bromwich Albion, Wigan Athletic
4 points: Arsenal, Queens Park Rangers, Stoke City, Swansea City, West Ham United, Chelsea
3 points: Norwich City, Southampton, Sunderland, Tottenham Hotspur, Manchester United

2 points: Liverpool

1 point: Everton

==== Biggest & smallest ====
Biggest home win: 5–0 vs. Aston Villa, 17 November 2012
Biggest home defeat: 2–3 vs. Norwich City (19 May 2013) and vs. Manchester United (9 December 2012)
Biggest away win: 4 by a 2-goal margin
Biggest away defeat: 3 by a 2-goal margin

Biggest home attendance: 47,386 vs. Everton, 1 December 2012
Smallest home attendance: 45,579 vs. Queens Park Rangers, 1 September 2012
Biggest away attendance: 75,498 vs. Manchester United, 8 April 2013
Smallest away attendance: 19,623 vs. Wigan Athletic, 28 November 2012

==== Results by round ====
Round	1	2	3	4	5	6	7	8	9	10	11	12	13	14	15	16	17	18	19	20	21	22	23	24	25	26	27	28	29	30	31	32	33	34	35	36	37	38
Ground	H	A	H	A	H	A	H	A	H	A	H	H	A	A	H	H	A	H	A	A	H	A	H	A	H	A	H	A	A	H	A	H	A	H	A	H	A	H
Result	W	D	W	D	D	W	W	W	W	D	W	W	D	W	D	L	W	W	L	W	W	W	W	D	D	L	W	W	L	W	W	W	L	W	D	W	W	L
Position	5	5	4	4	7	4	3	3	3	3	2	1	2	2	2	2	2	2	2	2	2	2	2	2	2	2	2	2	2	2	2	2	2	2	2	2	2	2

Updated to match(es) played on 19 May 2013. Source: Premier League results
A = Away; H = Home; W = Win; D = Draw; L = Loss

==== Matches ====
19 August 2012 1	Manchester City	3–2	Southampton	Manchester
16:00 BST	Tevez 39'; Džeko 71'; Nasri 80', (yellow card) 80'	Report	Lambert 60'; Fox (yellow card) 60'; Davis 67'; Schneiderlin (yellow card) 87'	Stadium: Etihad Stadium; Attendance: 46,109; Referee: Howard Webb

26 August 2012 2	Liverpool	2–2	Manchester City	Liverpool
16:00 BST	Škrtel 34'; Suárez 66', (yellow card) 90+4'	Report	Y. Touré 63'; Tevez 80'	Stadium: Anfield; Attendance: 44,492; Referee: Andre Marriner

1 September 2012 3	Manchester City	3–1	Queens Park Rangers	Manchester
17:30 BST	Y. Touré 16'; Kolarov (yellow card) 45'; Džeko 61'; Rodwell (yellow card) 73'; Tevez 90+2'	Report	Zamora 59', (yellow card) 85'	Stadium: Etihad Stadium; Attendance: 45,579; Referee: Chris Foy

15 September 2012 4	Stoke City	1–1	Manchester City	Stoke-on-Trent
15:00 BST	Crouch 15'	Report	García 35', (yellow card) 55'	Stadium: Britannia Stadium; Attendance: 27,101; Referee: Mark Clattenburg

23 September 2012 5	Manchester City	1–1	Arsenal	Manchester
16:00 BST	Lescott 40'	Report	Koscielny 82'	Stadium: Etihad Stadium; Attendance: 47,318; Referee: Mike Dean

29 September 2012 6	Fulham	1–2	Manchester City	London
15:00 BST	Petrić 10' (pen.)	Report	Agüero 43'; Džeko 87'	Stadium: Craven Cottage; Attendance: 25,698; Referee: Mark Halsey

6 October 2012 7	Manchester City	3–0	Sunderland	Manchester
12:45 BST	Kolarov 5'; Agüero 60'; Milner 89'	Report		Stadium: Etihad Stadium; Attendance: 47,036; Referee: Lee Probert

20 October 2012 8	West Bromwich Albion	1–2	Manchester City	West Bromwich
15:00 BST	Long 67'	Report	Džeko 80', 90+2'	Stadium: The Hawthorns; Attendance: 24,891; Referee: Mark Clattenburg

27 October 2012 9	Manchester City	1–0	Swansea City	Manchester
17:30 BST	Tevez 61'	Report		Stadium: Etihad Stadium; Attendance: 46,801; Referee: Martin Atkinson

3 November 2012 10	West Ham United	0–0	Manchester City	London
17:30 GMT		Report		Stadium: Upton Park; Attendance: 35,005; Referee: Howard Webb

11 November 2012 11	Manchester City	2–1	Tottenham Hotspur	Manchester
13:30 GMT	Zabaleta (yellow card) 29'; Agüero 65'; Džeko 88'	Report	Caulker 21'; Walker (yellow card) 27'; Adebayor (yellow card) 76'	Stadium: Etihad Stadium; Attendance: 47,208; Referee: Michael Oliver

17 November 2012 12	Manchester City	5–0	Aston Villa	Manchester
15:00 GMT	Silva 43'; Agüero 54' (pen.), 67'; Tevez 65' (pen.), 74'	Report		Stadium: Etihad Stadium; Attendance: 47,072; Referee: Jon Moss

25 November 2012 13	Chelsea	0–0	Manchester City	London
16:00 GMT		Report		Stadium: Stamford Bridge; Attendance: 41,792; Referee: Chris Foy

28 November 2012 14	Wigan Athletic	0–2	Manchester City	Wigan
20:00 GMT	Gómez (yellow card) 45+2'	Report	Barry (yellow card) 64'; Balotelli 69'; Milner 72'	Stadium: DW Stadium; Attendance: 19,623; Referee: Mark Halsey

1 December 2012 15	Manchester City	1–1	Everton	Manchester
15:00 GMT	Tevez 43' (pen.)	Report	Fellaini 33'	Stadium: Etihad Stadium; Attendance: 47,386; Referee: Lee Probert

9 December 2012 16	Manchester City	2–3	Manchester United	Manchester
13:30 GMT	Y. Touré 60'; Zabaleta 85'	Report	Rooney 15', 28'; Van Persie 90+3'	Stadium: Etihad Stadium; Attendance: 47,166; Referee: Martin Atkinson

15 December 2012 17	Newcastle United	1–3	Manchester City	Newcastle upon Tyne
12:45 GMT	Ba 51'	Report	Agüero 10'; García 39'; Y. Touré 78'	Stadium: St James' Park; Attendance: 49,579; Referee: Andre Marriner

22 December 2012 18	Manchester City	1–0	Reading	Manchester
15:00 GMT	Barry 90+3'	Report		Stadium: Etihad Stadium; Attendance: 47,007; Referee: Mike Dean

26 December 2012 19	Sunderland	1–0	Manchester City	Sunderland
15:00 GMT	Johnson 53'	Report		Stadium: Stadium of Light; Attendance: 42,190; Referee: Kevin Friend

29 December 2012 20	Norwich City	3–4	Manchester City	Norwich
15:00 GMT	Pilkington 15'; Martin 63', 75'	Report	Džeko 2', 4'; Agüero 50'; Bunn 67' (o.g.)	Stadium: Carrow Road; Attendance: 26,827; Referee: Mike Jones

1 January 2013 21	Manchester City	3–0	Stoke City	Manchester
15:00 GMT	Zabaleta 43'; Džeko 56', (yellow card) 57'; Lescott (yellow card) 59'; Agüero 74' (pen.)	Report	Huth (yellow card) 47'; Nzonzi (yellow card) 73'	Stadium: Etihad Stadium; Attendance: 47,192; Referee: Michael Oliver

13 January 2013 22	Arsenal	0–2	Manchester City	London
16:00 GMT		Report	Milner 21'; Džeko 32'	Stadium: Emirates Stadium; Attendance: 60,107; Referee: Mike Dean

19 January 2013 23	Manchester City	2–0	Fulham	Manchester
15:00 GMT	Silva 2', 69'; García (yellow card) 65'		Karagounis (yellow card) 24'; Richardson (yellow card) 56'	Stadium: Etihad Stadium; Attendance: 47,286; Referee: Jon Moss

29 January 2013 24	Queens Park Rangers	0–0	Manchester City	London
19:45 GMT	Mbia (yellow card) 40'; Granero (yellow card) 58'	Report	Barry (yellow card) 63'; Zabaleta (yellow card) 84'	Stadium: Loftus Road; Attendance: 17,894; Referee: Phil Dowd

3 February 2013 25	Manchester City	2–2	Liverpool	Manchester
16:00 GMT	Džeko 23'; Agüero 78'	Report	Sturridge 29'; Gerrard 73'	Stadium: Etihad Stadium; Attendance: 47,301; Referee: Anthony Taylor

9 February 2013 26	Southampton	3–1	Manchester City	Southampton
17:30 GMT	Puncheon 7'; Davis 22'; Barry 48' (o.g.)	Report	Džeko 39'	Stadium: St Mary's Stadium; Attendance: 31,738; Referee: Martin Atkinson

24 February 2013 27	Manchester City	2–0	Chelsea	Manchester
13:30 GMT	Y. Touré 63'; Tevez 85'	Report		Stadium: Etihad Stadium; Attendance: 47,256; Referee: Andre Marriner

4 March 2013 28	Aston Villa	0–1	Manchester City	Birmingham
20:00 GMT		Report	Tevez 45+1'	Stadium: Villa Park; Attendance: 33,217; Referee: Mike Dean

16 March 2013 29	Everton	2–0	Manchester City	Liverpool
12:45 GMT	Osman 32'; Jelavić 90'	Report		Stadium: Goodison Park; Attendance: 36,519; Referee: Lee Probert

30 March 2013 30	Manchester City	4–0	Newcastle United	Manchester
15:00 GMT	Tevez 41'; Silva 45+2'; Kompany 56'; Y. Touré 69'	Report; OG corrected		Stadium: Etihad Stadium; Attendance: 47,201; Referee: Neil Swarbrick

8 April 2013 31	Manchester United	1–2	Manchester City	Manchester
20:00 BST	Jones 59'	Report	Milner 51'; Agüero 78'	Stadium: Old Trafford; Attendance: 75,498; Referee: Mike Dean

17 April 2013 32	Manchester City	1–0	Wigan Athletic	Manchester
19:45 BST	Tevez 83'	Report		Stadium: Etihad Stadium; Attendance: 47,106; Referee: Anthony Taylor

21 April 2013 33	Tottenham Hotspur	3–1	Manchester City	London
13:30 BST	Dempsey 75'; Defoe 80'; Bale 82'	Report	Nasri 5'	Stadium: White Hart Lane; Attendance: 36,121; Referee: Lee Mason

27 April 2013 34	Manchester City	2–1	West Ham United	Manchester
12:45 BST	Agüero 28'; Y. Touré 83'	Report	Carroll 90+4'	Stadium: Etihad Stadium; Attendance: 47,189; Referee: Howard Webb

4 May 2013 35	Swansea City	0–0	Manchester City	Swansea
15:00 BST		Report		Stadium: Liberty Stadium; Attendance: 20,242; Referee: Mike Jones

7 May 2013 36	Manchester City	1–0	West Bromwich Albion	Manchester
19:45 BST	Džeko 35'	Report		Stadium: Etihad Stadium; Attendance: 46,158; Referee: Phil Dowd

14 May 2013 37	Reading	0–2	Manchester City	Reading
20:00 BST		Report	Agüero 40'; Džeko 88'	Stadium: Madejski Stadium; Attendance: 22,859; Referee: Martin Atkinson

19 May 2013 38	Manchester City	2–3	Norwich City	Manchester
16:00 BST	Rodwell 29', 59'	Report	Pilkington 26'; Holt 54'; Howson 65'	Stadium: Etihad Stadium; Attendance: 47,054; Referee: Mark Halsey

=== FA Cup ===
5 January 2013 Third round	Manchester City	3–0	Watford	Manchester
15:00 GMT	Tevez 22'; Barry 44'; Lopes 90+1'	Report		Stadium: Etihad Stadium; Attendance: 46,821; Referee: Phil Dowd

26 January 2013 Fourth round	Stoke City	0–1	Manchester City	Stoke-on-Trent
12:45 GMT		Report	Zabaleta 85'	Stadium: Britannia Stadium; Attendance: 19,814; Referee: Howard Webb

17 February 2013 Fifth round	Manchester City	4–0	Leeds United	Manchester
14:00 GMT	Y. Touré 5'; Agüero 15' (pen.), 74'; Tevez 52'	Report		Stadium: Etihad Stadium; Attendance: 46,849; Referee: Mark Clattenburg

9 March 2013 Sixth round	Manchester City	5–0	Barnsley	Manchester
17:30 GMT	Tevez 11', 31', 50'; Kolarov 27'; Silva 65'	Report		Stadium: Etihad Stadium; Attendance: 46,728; Referee: Anthony Taylor

14 April 2013 Semi-finals	Chelsea	1–2	Manchester City	London
16:00 BST	Ramires (yellow card) 46'; Ba 66'; Torres (yellow card) 85'	Report	Barry (yellow card) 26'; Nasri 35'; Y. Touré (yellow card) 45'; Agüero 47'; Kompany (yellow card) 78'	Stadium: Wembley Stadium; Attendance: 85,621; Referee: Chris Foy

11 May 2013 Final	Manchester City	0–1	Wigan Athletic	London
17:15 BST	Zabaleta (yellow card) 60' (yellow-red card) 84'; Nastasić (yellow card) 75'; Barry (yellow card) 87'	Report	Watson 90+1'; Robles (yellow card) 90+3'	Stadium: Wembley Stadium; Attendance: 86,254; Referee: Andre Marriner

=== Football League Cup ===
25 September 2012 Third round	Manchester City	2–4 (a.e.t.)	Aston Villa	Manchester
19:45 BST	Balotelli 27'; Kolarov 64'	Report	Barry 59' (o.g.); Agbonlahor 70', 113'; N'Zogbia 96'	Stadium: Etihad Stadium; Attendance: 28,015; Referee: Phil Dowd

=== UEFA Champions League ===
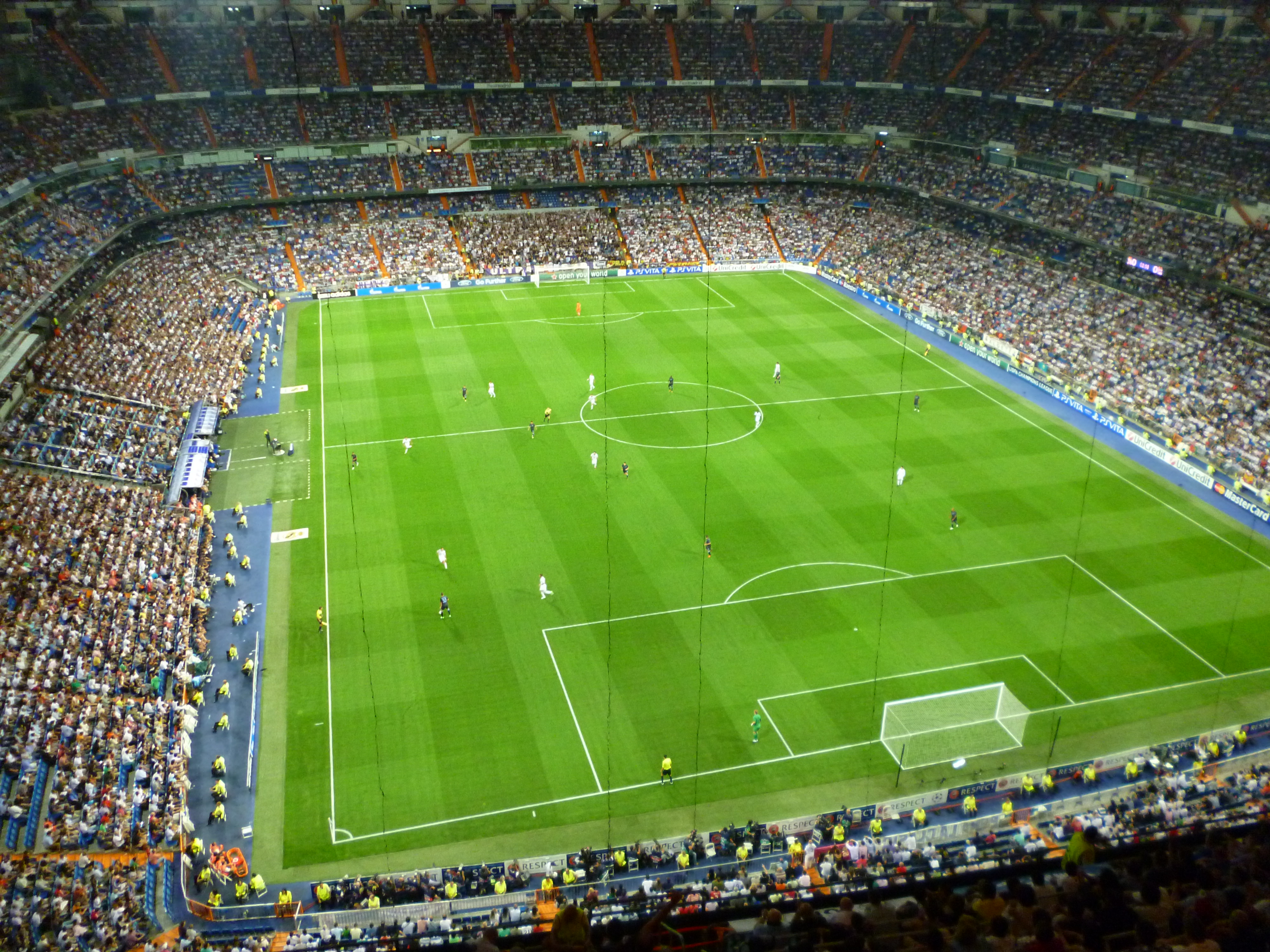
In their opening Champions League group game, Manchester City twice took the lead against Real Madrid at the Santiago Bernabéu, but ultimately lost the match.

==== Group stage ====
Pos	Team	Pld	W	D	L	GF	GA	GD	Pts	Qualification	DOR	RMA	AJX	MCI
1	(Germany) Borussia Dortmund	6	4	2	0	11	5	+6	14	Advance to knockout phase	—	2–1	1–0	1–0
2	(Spain) Real Madrid	6	3	2	1	15	9	+6	11	Advance to knockout phase	2–2	—	4–1	3–2
3	(Netherlands) Ajax	6	1	1	4	8	16	−8	4	Transfer to Europa League	1–4	1–4	—	3–1
4	(England) Manchester City	6	0	3	3	7	11	−4	3		1–1	1–1	2–2	—

Source: Soccerway

18 September 2012 1	Real Madrid (Spain)	3–2	(England) Manchester City	Madrid, Spain
19:45 BST	Marcelo 76'; Benzema 87'; Ronaldo 90'	Report	Džeko 69'; Kolarov 85'	Stadium: Santiago Bernabéu; Attendance: 67,000; Referee: Damir Skomina (Slovenia)

3 October 2012 2	Manchester City (England)	1–1	(Germany) Borussia Dortmund	Manchester, England
19:45 BST	Balotelli 90' (pen.)	Report	Reus 61'	Stadium: Etihad Stadium; Attendance: 43,607; Referee: Pavel Královec (Czech Republic)

24 October 2012 3	Ajax (Netherlands)	3–1	(England) Manchester City	Amsterdam, Netherlands
19:45 BST	De Jong 45'; Moisander 57'; Eriksen 68'	Report	Nasri 22'	Stadium: Amsterdam Arena; Attendance: 45,743; Referee: Svein Oddvar Moen

6 November 2012 4	Manchester City (England)	2–2	(Netherlands) Ajax	Manchester, England
19:45 GMT	Y. Touré 22'; Agüero 74'	Report	De Jong 10', 17'	Stadium: Etihad Stadium; Attendance: 40,222; Referee: Peter Rasmussen (Denmark)

21 November 2012 5	Manchester City (England)	1–1	(Spain) Real Madrid	Manchester, England
19:45 GMT	Agüero 73' (pen.)	Report	Benzema 10'	Stadium: Etihad Stadium; Attendance: 45,740; Referee: Gianluca Rocchi (Italy)

4 December 2012 6	Borussia Dortmund (Germany)	1–0	(England) Manchester City	Dortmund, Germany
19:45 GMT	Schieber 57'	Report		Stadium: Signal Iduna Park; Attendance: 62,000; Referee: Milorad Mažić (Serbia)

== Squad information ==
=== Player statistics – overall ===
N	Pos.	Nat.	Name	Age	EU	Since	App	Goals	Ends	Transfer fee	Notes
1	GK	(England)	Joe Hart	26	EU	2006	217	0	2016	£1.5M	
2	RB	(England)	Micah Richards	25	EU	2005	234	10	2015	Youth system	
3	RB	(Brazil)	Maicon	31	Non-EU	2012	13	0	2014	£3.5M	
4	CB	(Belgium)	Vincent Kompany (captain)	27	EU	2008	206	7	2018	£6M	
5	RB	(Argentina)	Pablo Zabaleta	28	Non-EU	2008	195	7	2015	£6M	
6	CB	(England)	Joleon Lescott	30	EU	2009	136	9	2014	£22M	
7	AM	(England)	James Milner	27	EU	2010	114	8	2015	£24M	
8	AM	(France)	Samir Nasri	26	EU	2011	83	11	2015	£25M	
10	FW	(Bosnia and Herzegovina)	Edin Džeko	27	Non-EU	2011 (Winter)	109	40	2015	£27M	
11	AM	(England)	Scott Sinclair	24	EU	2012	15	0	2016	£6.2M	
13	LB	(Serbia)	Aleksandar Kolarov	27	Non-EU	2010	94	11	2015	£16M	
14	CM	(Spain)	Javi García	26	EU	2012	33	2	2017	£16M	
16	FW	(Argentina)	Sergio Agüero	25	Non-EU	2011	88	47	2017	£35M	
17	CM	(England)	Jack Rodwell	22	EU	2012	15	2	2017	£12M	
18	CM	(England)	Gareth Barry	32	EU	2009	174	8	2014	£12M	
21	AM	(Spain)	David Silva	27	EU	2010	143	19	2017	£24M	
22	LB	(France)	Gaël Clichy	27	EU	2011	74	0	2017	£7M	
28	CB	(Ivory Coast)	Kolo Touré	32	Non-EU	2009	102	3	2013	£16M	
29	GK	(England)	Richard Wright	35	EU	2012	0	0	2013	Free	
30	GK	(Romania)	Costel Pantilimon	26	EU	2011	11	0	2016	£1M	
32	FW	(Argentina)	Carlos Tevez	29	Non-EU	2009	147	73	2014	£25.5M	
33	CB	(Serbia)	Matija Nastasić	20	Non-EU	2012	30	0	2017	£10M	
42	CM	(Ivory Coast)	Yaya Touré	30	Non-EU	2010	134	31	2017	£24M	
60	FW	(Sweden)	John Guidetti	21	EU	2008	1	0	2015	Youth system	
62	CM	(Ivory Coast)	Abdul Razak	20	Non-EU	2010	10	0		Youth system	

- Last updated: 19 May 2013
- Source: , Players transfer, Manchester City Matchday Program MCFC vs Arsenal
- Ordered by squad number.

Appearances include all competitive league and cup appearances, including as substitute.

=== Playing statistics ===
As of 19 May 2013

Appearances (Apps) numbers are for appearances in competitive games only, including sub appearances.
Red card numbers denote: numbers in parentheses represent red cards overturned for wrongful dismissal.

No.	Pos.	Squad status	Player name	Premier League				Champions League				FA Cup				League Cup				Community Shield				Totals All competitions			
No.	Pos.	Squad status	Player name	Apps.		Yellow card	Red card	Apps.		Yellow card	Red card	Apps.		Yellow card	Red card	Apps.		Yellow card	Red card	Apps.		Yellow card	Red card	Apps.		Yellow card	Red card
1	GK	HGP	(England) Joe Hart	38	-	1	-	6	-	-	-	1	-	-	-	-	-	-	-	-	-	-	-	45	-	1	-
2	DF	ACG	(England) Micah Richards (vc)	7	-	2	-	1	-	-	-	-	-	-	-	-	-	-	-	-	-	-	-	8	-	2	-
3	DF	FOR	(Brazil) Maicon	4(5)	-	-	-	3	-	1	-	0(1)	-	-	-	-	-	-	-	-	-	-	-	7(6)	-	1	-
4	DF	FOR	(Belgium) Vincent Kompany (c)	26	1	3	(1)	6	-	2	-	4	-	1	-	-	-	-	-	1	-	1	-	37	1	7	(1)
5	DF	FOR	(Argentina) Pablo Zabaleta	29(1)	2	7	-	3(2)	-	1	-	6	1	1	1	-	-	-	-	1	-	-	-	39(3)	3	9	1
6	DF	HGP	(England) Joleon Lescott	17(9)	1	3	-	2	-	1	-	3(1)	-	-	-	1	-	-	-	-	-	-	-	23(10)	1	4	-
7	MF	HGP	(England) James Milner	19(7)	4	1	1	1(1)	-	-	-	4(2)	-	1	-	1	-	-	-	1	-	-	-	26(10)	4	2	1
8	MF	FOR	(France) Samir Nasri	22(6)	2	3	1	6	1	1	-	3	1	-	-	-	-	-	-	1	1	-	-	32(6)	5	4	1
10	FW	FOR	(Bosnia and Herzegovina) Edin Džeko	16(16)	14	4	-	4(2)	1	1	-	3(2)	-	1	-	0(1)	-	-	-	0(1)	-	-	-	23(22)	15	6	-
11	MF	HGP	(England) Scott Sinclair	2(9)	-	-	-	1	-	-	-	0(2)	-	-	-	0(1)	-	-	-	-	-	-	-	3(12)	-	-	-
13	DF	FOR	(Serbia) Aleksandar Kolarov	11(9)	1	5	-	1(4)	1	1	-	3	1	1	-	1	1	1	-	1	-	-	-	17(13)	4	8	-
14	MF	FOR	(Spain) Javi García	17(7)	2	5	-	4(1)	-	3	-	3(1)	-	1	-	-	-	-	-	-	-	-	-	24(9)	2	9	-
16	FW	FOR	(Argentina) Sergio Agüero	22(8)	12	2	-	4(1)	2	-	-	3(1)	3	-	-	-	-	-	-	1	-	-	-	30(10)	17	2	-
17	MF	HGP	(England) Jack Rodwell	6(5)	2	2	-	0(1)	-	-	-	0(3)	-	-	-	-	-	-	-	-	-	-	-	6(9)	2	2	-
18	MF	HGP	(England) Gareth Barry	27(4)	1	6	-	4	-	-	-	5	1	2	-	1	-	-	-	-	-	-	-	37(4)	2	8	-
21	MF	FOR	(Spain) David Silva	29(3)	4	2	-	3	-	-	-	5	1	-	-	-	-	-	-	0(1)	-	-	-	37(4)	5	2	-
22	DF	HGP	(France) Gaël Clichy	26(2)	-	3	-	4	-	-	-	3(1)	-	-	-	-	-	-	-	0(1)	-	-	-	33(4)	-	3	-
28	DF	FOR	(Ivory Coast) Kolo Touré	10(5)	-	2	-	-	-	-	-	2	-	-	-	1	-	1	-	-	-	-	-	13(5)	-	3	-
30	GK	FOR	(Romania) Costel Pantilimon	-	-	-	-	-	-	-	-	5	-	-	-	1	-	-	-	1	-	1	-	7	-	1	-
32	FW	FOR	(Argentina) Carlos Tevez	28(6)	11	3	-	3(2)	-	-	-	6	5	-	-	1	-	1	-	1	1	-	-	39(8)	17	4	-
33	DF	YTH	(Serbia) Matija Nastasić	21	-	1	-	5	-	-	-	3	-	1	-	1	-	-	-	-	-	-	-	30	-	2	-
36	MF	YTH	(Spain) Denis Suárez	-	-	-	-	–	-	-	-	-	-	-	-	1	-	-	-	-	-	-	-	1	-	-	-
42	MF	FOR	(Ivory Coast) Yaya Touré (vc)	32	7	6	-	5	1	3	-	4	1	2	-	-	-	-	-	1	1	-	-	42	10	11	-
44	DF	ACG	(Netherlands) Karim Rekik	1	-	-	-	-	-	-	-	-	-	-	-	-	-	-	-	-	-	-	-	1	-	-	-
61	MF	ACG	(France) Jeremy Helan	-	-	-	-	-	-	-	-	-	-	-	-	0(1)	-	-	-	-	-	-	-	0(1)	-	-	-
62	MF	ACG	(Ivory Coast) Abdul Razak	0(3)	-	-	-	-	-	-	-	0(1)	-	-	-	1	-	1	-	-	-	-	-	1(4)	-	1	-
64	MF	ACG	(Portugal) Marcos Lopes	-	-	-	-	-	-	-	-	0(1)	1	-	-	-	-	-	-	-	-	-	-	0(1)	1	-	-
Sold	MF	FOR	(Netherlands) Nigel de Jong	1	-	-	-	-	-	-	-	-	-	-	-	-	-	-	-	1	-	-	-	2	-	-	-
Sold	DF	YTH	(Montenegro) Stefan Savić	-	-	-	-	-	-	-	-	-	-	-	-	-	-	-	-	1	-	1	-	1	-	1	-
Sold	FW	YTH	(Italy) Mario Balotelli	7(7)	1	2	-	0(4)	1	1	-	0(1)	-	-	-	1	1	-	-	-	-	-	-	8(12)	3	3	-
			Own goals	-	1	-	-	-	-	-	-	-	-	-	-	-	-	-	-	-	-	-	-	-	1	-	-
Totals					66	63	2(1)		7	15	-		15	11	1		2	4	-		3	3	-		93	97	3(1)
Totals						Yellow card	Red card			Yellow card	Red card			Yellow card	Red card			Yellow card	Red card			Yellow card	Red card			Yellow card	Red card

Source: (for players and positions) Season 2012–13 First Team Squad (for squad numbers) Squad Profiles (for actual stats.)

=== Goalscorers ===
Includes all competitive matches. The list is sorted by shirt number when total goals are equal.

Last updated on 19 May 2013

Rank	Pos	No.	Player	Premier League	Champions League	FA Cup	League Cup	Community Shield	Total
1	FW	16	(Argentina) Sergio Agüero	12	2	3	0	0	17
1	FW	32	(Argentina) Carlos Tevez	11	0	5	0	1	17
3	FW	10	(Bosnia and Herzegovina) Edin Džeko	14	1	0	0	0	15
4	MF	42	(Ivory Coast) Yaya Touré	7	1	1	0	1	10
5	MF	21	(Spain) David Silva	4	0	1	0	0	5
5	MF	8	(France) Samir Nasri	2	1	1	0	1	5
7	MF	7	(England) James Milner	4	0	0	0	0	4
7	DF	13	(Serbia) Aleksandar Kolarov	1	1	1	1	0	4
9	DF	5	(Argentina) Pablo Zabaleta	2	0	1	0	0	3
9	FW	Sold	(Italy) Mario Balotelli	1	1	0	1	0	3
11	MF	14	(Spain) Javi García	2	0	0	0	0	2
11	MF	17	(England) Jack Rodwell	2	0	0	0	0	2
11	MF	18	(England) Gareth Barry	1	0	1	0	0	2
14	DF	4	(Belgium) Vincent Kompany	1	0	0	0	0	1
14	DF	6	(England) Joleon Lescott	1	0	0	0	0	1
14	MF	64	(Portugal) Marcos Lopes	0	0	1	0	0	1
#	Own Goal			1	0	0	0	0	1
Total				66	7	15	2	3	93

== Awards ==
=== PFA Team of the Year ===
The combined best 11 from all teams in the Premier League chosen by the PFA.

Player	Position
(Argentina) Pablo Zabaleta	Defence

=== Premier League Golden Glove award ===
Awarded to the goalkeeper who kept the most clean sheets over the 2012–13 Premier League season.

Player	Clean sheets
(England) Joe Hart	18

=== Etihad Player of the Year ===
Based on votes polled by official supporters' clubs and fans online.

Player	Award
(Argentina) Pablo Zabaleta	Player of the Year

=== Etihad Player of the Month awards ===
Awarded to the player that receives the most votes in a poll conducted each month on the official website of Manchester City.

Month	Player
September	(Bosnia and Herzegovina) Edin Džeko
October	(England) Joe Hart
November	(Serbia) Matija Nastasić
December	(Argentina) Pablo Zabaleta
January	(Argentina) Pablo Zabaleta
February	(England) James Milner
March	(Argentina) Carlos Tevez
April	(France) Samir Nasri

== Transfers and loans ==
=== Transfers in ===
First team
Date	Pos.	No.	Player	From club	Transfer fee
12 August 2012	MF	17	(England) Jack Rodwell	(England) Everton	£12,000,000
30 August 2012	GK	29	(England) Richard Wright	Unattached	Free
31 August 2012	MF	11	(England) Scott Sinclair	(Wales) Swansea City	£6,200,000
31 August 2012	DF	3	(Brazil) Maicon	(Italy) Internazionale	£5,000,000
31 August 2012	DF	33	(Serbia) Matija Nastasić	(Italy) Fiorentina	£12,000,000 + Stefan Savić
31 August 2012	MF	14	(Spain) Javi García	(Portugal) Benfica	£17,000,000

Reserves and Academy
Date	Pos.	No.	Player	From club	Transfer fee
4 August 2012	MF	–	(Romania) Vlad Marin	(Italy) Lazio	Undisclosed
13 August 2012	MF	–	(France) Olivier Ntcham	(France) Le Havre	Undisclosed
31 January 2013	FW	–	(Ghana) Godsway Donyoh	(Ghana) Right to Dream Academy	Undisclosed

=== Transfers out ===
First team
Exit Date	Pos.	No.	Player	To club	Transfer fee
22 May 2012	MF	20	(England) Owen Hargreaves	Released	
22 May 2012	MF	35	(Israel) Gai Assulin	(Spain) Racing Santander	Released
1 July 2012	GK	12	(England) Stuart Taylor	(England) Reading	Released
21 August 2012	FW	9	(Togo) Emmanuel Adebayor	(England) Tottenham Hotspur	£5,000,000
24 August 2012	MF	11	(England) Adam Johnson	(England) Sunderland	£12,000,000
31 August 2012	MF	34	(Netherlands) Nigel de Jong	(Italy) Milan	£3,100,000
31 August 2012	DF	15	(Montenegro) Stefan Savić	(Italy) Fiorentina	Swap
7 December 2012	GK	–	(Faroe Islands) Gunnar Nielsen	Released	
28 December 2012	MF	–	(England) Michael Johnson	Released	
30 January 2013	FW	45	(Italy) Mario Balotelli	(Italy) Milan	£19,000,000

Reserves and Academy
Exit Date	Pos.	No.	Player	To club	Transfer fee
22 May 2012	MF	–	(Libya) Ahmed Benali	(Italy) Brescia	Released
22 May 2012	DF	33	(Republic of Ireland) Greg Cunningham	(England) Bristol City	Undisclosed
2 Aug 2012	MF	40	(Slovakia) Vladimír Weiss	(Italy) Pescara	£1,500,000

=== Loans out ===
First team
Start date	End date	Pos.	No.	Player	To club
14 July 2012	31 December 2012	MF	50	(Norway) Abdisalam Ibrahim	(Norway) Strømsgodset
21 July 2012	31 May 2013	DF	3	(England) Wayne Bridge	(England) Brighton & Hove Albion
31 August 2012	31 May 2013	FW	14	(Paraguay) Roque Santa Cruz	(Spain) Málaga
31 August 2012	31 May 2013	DF	38	(Belgium) Dedryck Boyata	(Netherlands) Twente
1 October 2012	31 December 2012	MF	62	(Ivory Coast) Abdul Razak	(England) Charlton Athletic

Reserves and Academy
Start date	End date	Pos.	No.	Player	To club
6 July 2012	31 May 2013	MF	–	(Norway) Omar Elabdellaoui	(Netherlands) Feyenoord
3 August 2012	31 May 2013	MF	–	(Ghana) Mohammed Abu	(Spain) Rayo Vallecano
31 August 2012	31 December 2012	DF	–	(Northern Ireland) Ryan McGivern	(Scotland) Hibernian
25 September 2012	28 January 2013	DF	57	(England) Reece Wabara	(England) Oldham Athletic
25 October 2012	21 November 2012	DF	61	(France) Jérémy Hélan	(England) Shrewsbury Town
22 November 2012	8 May 2013	DF	61	(France) Jérémy Hélan	(England) Sheffield Wednesday
8 January 2013	31 May 2013	FW	49	(Italy) Luca Scapuzzi	(Italy) Varese
10 January 2013	31 May 2013	FW	43	(England) Alex Nimely	(England) Crystal Palace
30 January 2013	5 May 2013	DF	57	(England) Reece Wabara	(England) Blackpool
15 February 2013	5 May 2013	DF	44	(Netherlands) Karim Rekik	(England) Blackburn Rovers
7 March 2013	5 May 2013	GK	63	(Norway) Eirik Johansen	(England) Scunthorpe United
31 January 2013	Rest of season	ST	–	(Ghana) Godsway Donyoh	(Sweden) Djurgårdens IF
21 August 2012	6 January 2013	FW	–	(England) Harry Bunn	(England) Crewe Alexandra
25 October 2012	29 November 2012	DF	61	(England) Michael Rayner	(England) Bradford City
