= Pablo Zabaleta =

Argentine footballer (born 1985)

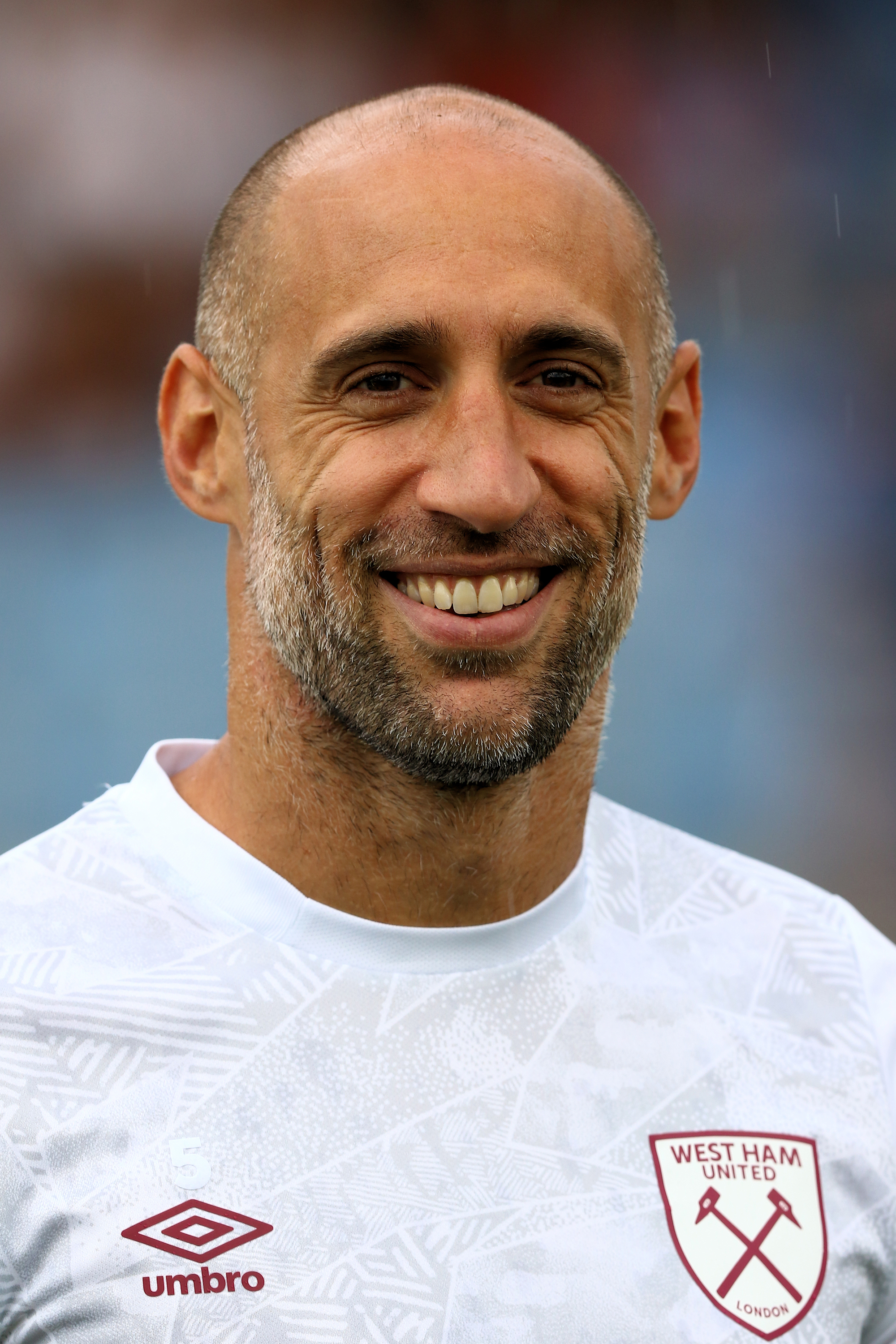
- Zabaleta with West Ham United in 2019

Personal information
- Full name: Pablo Javier Zabaleta Girod
- Date of birth: 16 January 1985 (age 41)
- Place of birth: Buenos Aires, Argentina
- Height: 1.76 m (5 ft 9 in)
- Position: Right back

Youth career
- 1995–1997: Obras Sanitarias
- 1997–2002: San Lorenzo

Senior career*
Years	Team	Apps	(Gls)
2002–2005	San Lorenzo	66	(8)
2005–2008	Espanyol	79	(3)
2008–2017	Manchester City	230	(9)
2017–2020	West Ham United	73	(1)
Total		448	(20)

International career
2003–2005	Argentina U20	28	(4)
2008	Argentina U23	9	(0)
2005–2016	Argentina	58	(0)

Managerial career
- 2023–2026: Albania (assistant)
Medal record
Men's football
Representing Argentina
Olympic Games
Gold medal – first place	2008 Beijing	Team
FIFA U-20 World Cup
Winner	2005 Netherlands
FIFA World Cup
Runner-up	2014 Brazil
Copa América
Runner-up	2015 Chile
- * Club domestic league appearances and goals

Pablo Javier Zabaleta Girod (Latin American Spanish: [ˈpaβlo saβaˈleta]; born 16 January 1985) is an Argentine former professional footballer who played as a right back. Zabaleta could operate on both sides of the pitch as a full-back and was known for his tenacious style of play, and has captained his club on numerous occasions.

With Manchester City, Zabaleta won all of English football's major honours: the FA Cup (2011), the Premier League (2012 and 2014), the League Cup (2014 and 2016) and the Community Shield (2012). Moreover, Zabaleta is often considered to be a cult hero at Manchester City owing to his determination and passion for the club. Before joining Manchester City, Zabaleta played for La Liga club Espanyol, where he won the 2005–06 Copa del Rey. He made 333 appearances over nine seasons for Manchester City before signing for London-based club West Ham United in the summer of 2017.

A full international since 2005, Zabaleta represented Argentina at the 2011 and 2015 Copa América, and was part of their team which finished as runners-up in the 2014 FIFA World Cup. He was also in their team which won gold at the 2008 Olympics.

From 2023 until March 2026, Zabaleta served as assistant manager of Albania's national football team, under head coach Sylvinho.

== Club career ==
=== San Lorenzo ===
Born in Buenos Aires, Zabaleta was raised in Arrecifes. He began his career at San Lorenzo in 2002, after progressing through their youth ranks, having been signed at the age of 12 from local club Obras Sanitarias. He started playing as a defensive midfielder, but eventually moved to the right side of midfield.

=== Espanyol ===
Zabaleta was transferred to Espanyol in 2005 for €3 million after being Argentina under-20s captain in the 2005 FIFA World Youth Championship, which Argentina won. During the 2005–06 season, Zabaleta helped Espanyol to win the Copa del Rey, playing the full 90 minutes in the 4–1 victory over Real Zaragoza in the final.

In January 2007, Zabaleta suffered a shoulder injury that kept him off the pitch for almost three months, already having established himself as an undisputed first team choice. Later in the season, he featured in the 2006–07 UEFA Cup final, where Espanyol lost on penalties to fellow Spanish side Sevilla.

=== Manchester City ===
==== 2008–2012 ====
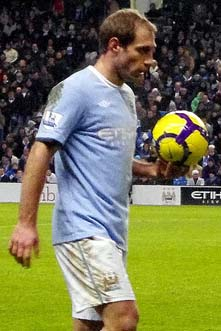
Zabaleta playing for Manchester City in 2009

In the summer of 2008, Zabaleta transferred to Premier League club Manchester City after rejecting an offer from Juventus. He stated upon joining: "The offer is impossible to reject and not just because of the money ... Juventus also wanted me but I wanted to come to England, and to Manchester." Having passed a medical and agreed personal terms, Zabaleta completed a five-year deal with City on 31 August 2008 for an undisclosed fee, believed to be the buy-out clause Zabaleta had attached to his contract of around £6.45 million. Zabaleta joined a day before Manchester City was bought by the Abu Dhabi United Group, led by Sheikh Mansour, which enabled a wealth of investment in the club.

On 13 September 2008, Zabaleta made his debut for Manchester City in a 3–1 defeat to Chelsea at the City of Manchester Stadium. On 5 October, he received his first red card in English football when he was sent off in a 3–2 loss to Liverpool in his fourth Premier League appearance. He scored his first goal for City on 17 January 2009, the only goal of the game in a 1–0 league win over Wigan Athletic.

On 21 November 2010, Zabaleta scored his second Premier League goal in Manchester City's 4–1 win against Fulham. In the same match, he assisted a Carlos Tevez goal, helping his compatriot to earn his ninth goal for the club during the 2010–11 season.

On 1 January 2011, Zabaleta played his 100th game for Manchester City in all competitions, coming off the bench against Blackpool in a 1–0 win at Eastlands. Two weeks later, on 15 January, Zabaleta made his second assist of the season in a 4–3 win over Wolverhampton Wanderers. This win meant that City went top of the league above local rivals Manchester United. However, City's title challenge faded with a loss of form in February and March 2011.

On 1 May 2011, Zabaleta scored his second goal of the season in a Premier League match against West Ham United. This secured a 2–1 win for the Citizens and put them seven points ahead of Liverpool and Tottenham Hotspur in the race for fourth place.

On 14 May 2011, Zabaleta appeared as an 88th-minute substitute for Carlos Tevez in the 2011 FA Cup Final as Manchester City beat Stoke City 1–0.

In the summer of 2011, it was reported that Italian club Roma were keen on signing Zabaleta, but Manchester City insisted the player was not for sale and Zabaleta agreed a three-year contract in July 2011. On 1 October 2011, Zabaleta started and played the full 90 minutes at right-back in a 4–0 win over Blackburn Rovers at Ewood Park in the Premier League, as regular starter Micah Richards was not available. On 23 October, he was an unused substitute in the convincing 6–1 win over rivals Manchester United at Old Trafford, with Richards starting at right-back.

In November 2011, Zabaleta extended his contract with City until the summer of 2015. Zabaleta said: "I'm in a very good team, and I try to do my best for the club, the team and the fans. I didn't think twice, I gave a quick answer because I was so happy to sign."

On 30 April 2012, he started and played the full 90 minutes in the right-back slot in a 1–0 victory over rivals Manchester United thanks to a first-half stoppage time header by Vincent Kompany from a corner at the City of Manchester Stadium. Zabaleta broke the deadlock by scoring the first goal in City's dramatic 3–2 win over Queens Park Rangers on the last day of the season, a scoreline which won the club its first league title since 1968. On 9 December 2012, Zabaleta scored a late equalising goal in a 3–2 defeat to Manchester United.

==== 2013–2017 ====
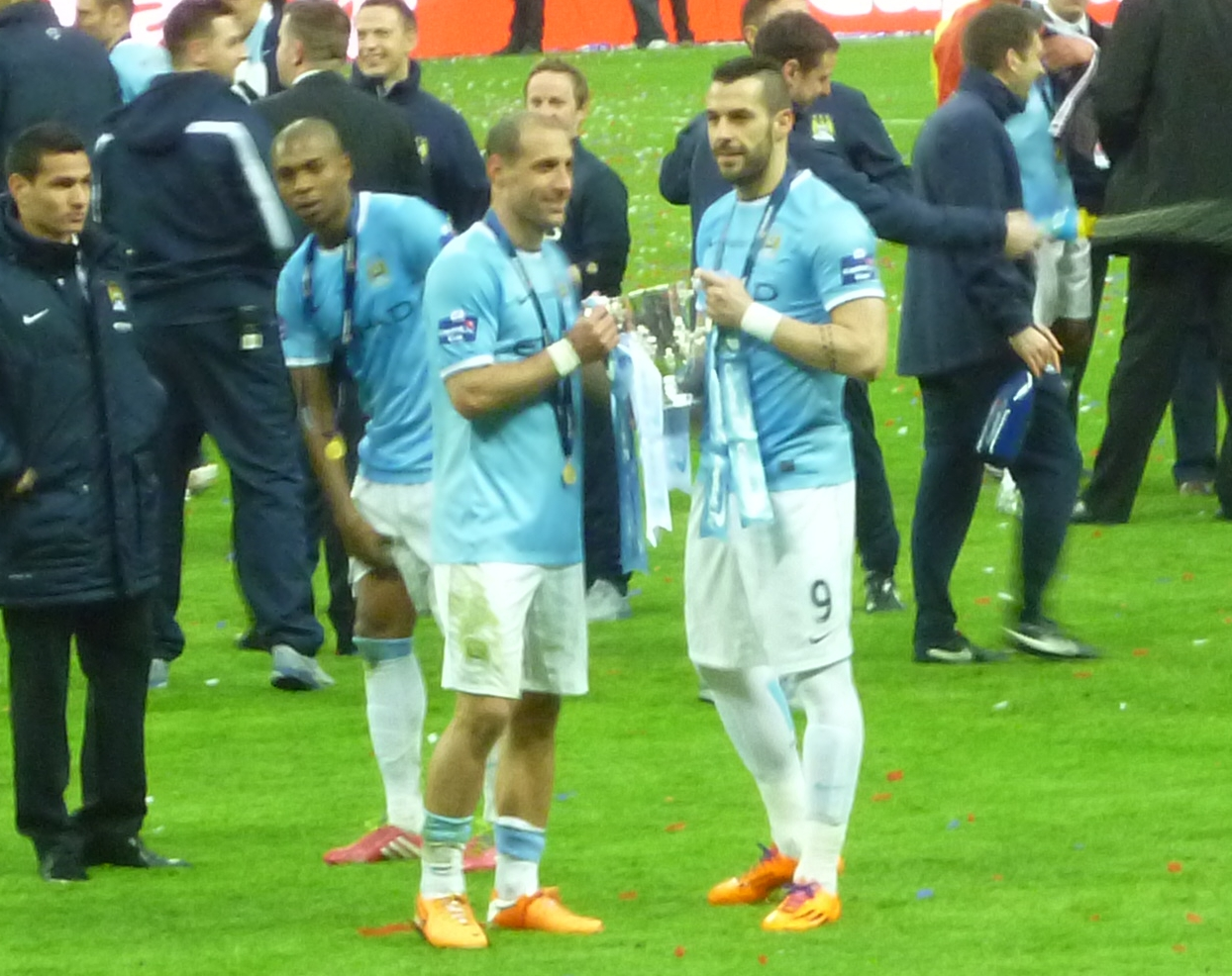
Zabaleta and Álvaro Negredo with the trophy after the 2014 League Cup Final

On 1 January 2013, he scored the opening goal in a 3–0 win at the City of Manchester Stadium over Stoke City, doubling his goal tally from the previous season. On 25 January 2013, Zabaleta scored his third goal of the season and the only goal of the match in a 1–0 win away against Stoke City in the FA Cup, fourth round. His goal took Manchester City through to the fifth round.

Zabaleta was voted Manchester City's Player of the Month for both December 2012 and January 2013, and was stand-in captain for the club during Vincent Kompany's injury absence between January and March 2013. He was the only City player to be named in the 2012–13 Premier League PFA Team of the Year. After a superb season, Zabaleta was voted 2012–13 Manchester City Player of the Year.

Zabaleta was sent off in the 2013 FA Cup Final against Wigan Athletic for a second yellow card after a clear foul on Callum McManaman 84 minutes into the match. Wigan went on to win 1–0 through a Ben Watson goal in stoppage time. He was the third player to be sent off in an FA Cup final and first for the losing side.

On 2 March 2014, Zabaleta played the full 90 minutes as Manchester City beat Sunderland 3–1 in the 2014 League Cup Final to complete a full set of major honours in English football. On 21 April, he scored his first goal of the season in a 3–1 defeat of West Bromwich Albion at the City of Manchester Stadium. On 11 May, Zabaleta was part of the victory against West Ham that won Manchester City the Premier League, his second in three seasons.

On 21 September 2014, Zabaleta was sent off for a second yellow card due to a challenge on Chelsea's Diego Costa. Both players received a yellow card, Zabaleta for the initial challenge and Costa for his reaction.

On 21 August 2015, it was announced that Zabaleta was out for a month with knee injury. On 17 January 2016, Zabaleta reached 200 appearances for Manchester City in the club's 4–0 victory over Crystal Palace.

Zabaleta made 32 appearances in all competitions in the 2016–17 season scoring two goals; against Watford in the Premier League and against Huddersfield Town in the FA Cup. His final appearance for Manchester City came on 16 May 2017, a 3–1 home win against West Bromwich Albion. After the game he was praised by the City manager, Pep Guardiola, as a "legend". Zabaleta was given a lifetime season ticket for Manchester City and a shirt that read "Zabaleta 333", to mark the number of City appearances he made.

=== West Ham United ===
On 26 May 2017, Zabaleta signed for Premier League club West Ham United on a free transfer, agreeing to a two-year contract. He was given number five as his squad number, the same number he wore for City.

On 22 May 2018, Manuel Pellegrini was confirmed as manager of West Ham United, reuniting him with his former manager at Manchester City.

In May 2019, Zabaleta extended his contract with West Ham Until the summer of 2020. On 5 January 2020, Zabaleta scored his only goal for West Ham, in a 2–0 win against Gillingham in the FA Cup third round. On 10 January 2020, in a match against Sheffield United, Zabaleta became the first Argentine, and only the third South American, to record 300 Premier League appearances. In June 2020, West Ham confirmed his departure from the club at the end of the month. Zabaleta played 80 times for West Ham over three seasons, scoring one goal.

== International career ==
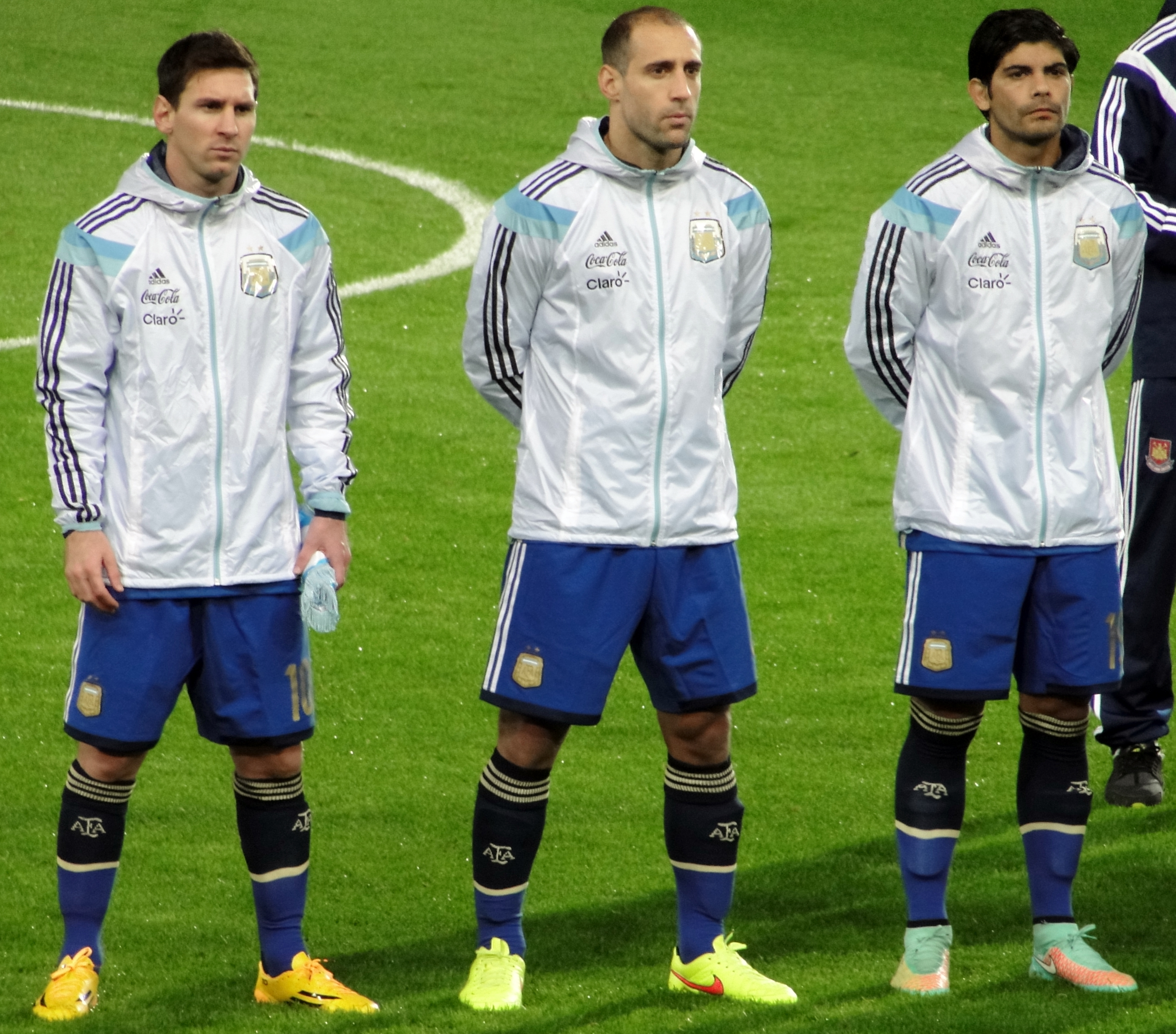
Zabaleta (middle) lining up for Argentina in 2014

At the age of 14, Zabaleta was called up by Hugo Tocalli to the Argentina under-15 squad. He took part in many youth tournaments, including the FIFA U-20 World Cup in 2003 and 2005, winning the latter in the Netherlands. He received over 75 caps to national youth sides, and started representing the senior side in 2005. He was also a member of the gold medal-winning team at the 2008 Summer Olympics, starting at right-back and playing all six matches.

After the 2010 FIFA World Cup, for which Zabaleta was not selected by head coach Diego Maradona, under the new Argentina manager he has established himself as first-choice right-back. On 1 June 2011, Zabaleta captained Argentina for the first time in a friendly against Nigeria.

In June 2014, Zabaleta was named in Argentina's squad for the 2014 World Cup. He made his World Cup debut in Argentina's 2–1 win over Bosnia and Herzegovina at the Estádio do Maracanã, playing the full match in defence.

At the 2015 Copa América in Chile, Zabaleta sent in the cross from which his Manchester City teammate Sergio Agüero headed the only goal of the game as Argentina defeated holders Uruguay in their second group match.

== Post-retirement career ==
In June 2018, he worked as a pundit for the BBC's Match of the Day 2018 World Cup coverage from Russia. Zabaleta again worked as a pundit for the BBC and Match of the Day during their coverage of the 2022 World Cup in Qatar.

After announcing his retirement from professional football on 16 October 2020, Pablo Zabaleta transitioned into a coaching role. In January 2023, he was appointed as an assistant coach of the Albania national football team, joining the coaching staff under head coach Sylvinho.

He now works for ESPN on their La Liga coverage.

== Personal life ==
Zabaleta is of Spanish Basque descent. He has a tattoo on his chest which bears the name of his mother.

Zabaleta is a fan is english rock band Status Quo and his favorite song is Whatever You Want.

== Career statistics ==
=== Club ===
Appearances and goals by club, season and competition
Club	Season	League			National Cup (Note: Includes Copa del Rey, FA Cup)		League Cup (Note: Includes Football League/EFL Cup)		Continental		Other		Total	
Club	Season	Division	Apps	Goals	Apps	Goals	Apps	Goals	Apps	Goals	Apps	Goals	Apps	Goals
San Lorenzo	2002–03	Argentine Primera División	11	0	—		—		1 (Note: Appearance(s) in Copa Sudamericana)	0	—		12	0
San Lorenzo	2003–04	Argentine Primera División	27	3	—		—		3	0	—		30	3
San Lorenzo	2004–05	Argentine Primera División	28	5	—		—		9 (Note: Appearances in Copa Libertadores)	0	—		37	5
San Lorenzo	Total		66	8	—		—		13	0	—		79	8
Espanyol	2005–06	La Liga	27	2	1	0	—		7 (Note: Appearances in UEFA Cup)	0	—		35	2
Espanyol	2006–07	La Liga	20	0	0	0	—		9	0	2 (Note: Appearances in Supercopa de España)	0	31	0
Espanyol	2007–08	La Liga	32	1	4	0	—		—		—		36	1
Espanyol	Total		79	3	5	0	—		16	0	2	0	102	3
Manchester City	2008–09	Premier League	29	1	1	0	1	0	11	0	—		42	1
Manchester City	2009–10	Premier League	27	0	4	0	4	0	—		—		35	0
Manchester City	2010–11	Premier League	26	2	7	0	1	0	11 (Note: Appearances in UEFA Europa League)	0	—		45	2
Manchester City	2011–12	Premier League	21	1	1	0	4	0	5 (Note: Four appearances in UEFA Champions League, one appearance in UEFA Europa League)	0	0	0	31	1
Manchester City	2012–13	Premier League	30	2	6	1	0	0	5 (Note: Appearances in UEFA Champions League)	0	1 (Note: Appearance in FA Community Shield)	0	42	3
Manchester City	2013–14	Premier League	35	1	3	0	4	0	6	0	—		48	1
Manchester City	2014–15	Premier League	29	1	1	0	0	0	6	1	0	0	36	2
Manchester City	2015–16	Premier League	13	0	3	0	3	0	3	0	—		22	0
Manchester City	2016–17	Premier League	20	1	4	1	1	0	7	0	—		32	2
Manchester City	Total		230	9	30	2	18	0	54	1	1	0	333	12
West Ham United	2017–18	Premier League	37	0	2	0	0	0	—		—		39	0
West Ham United	2018–19	Premier League	26	0	0	0	1	0	—		—		27	0
West Ham United	2019–20	Premier League	10	0	2	1	2	0	—		—		14	1
West Ham United	Total		73	0	4	1	3	0	—		—		80	1
Career total			448	20	39	3	21	0	83	1	3	0	594	24

=== International ===
Appearances and goals by national team and year
National team	Year	Apps	Goals
Argentina	2005	2	0
Argentina	2006	2	0
Argentina	2008	3	0
Argentina	2010	1	0
Argentina	2011	13	0
Argentina	2012	7	0
Argentina	2013	7	0
Argentina	2014	12	0
Argentina	2015	7	0
Argentina	2016	4	0
Total		58	0

== Honours ==
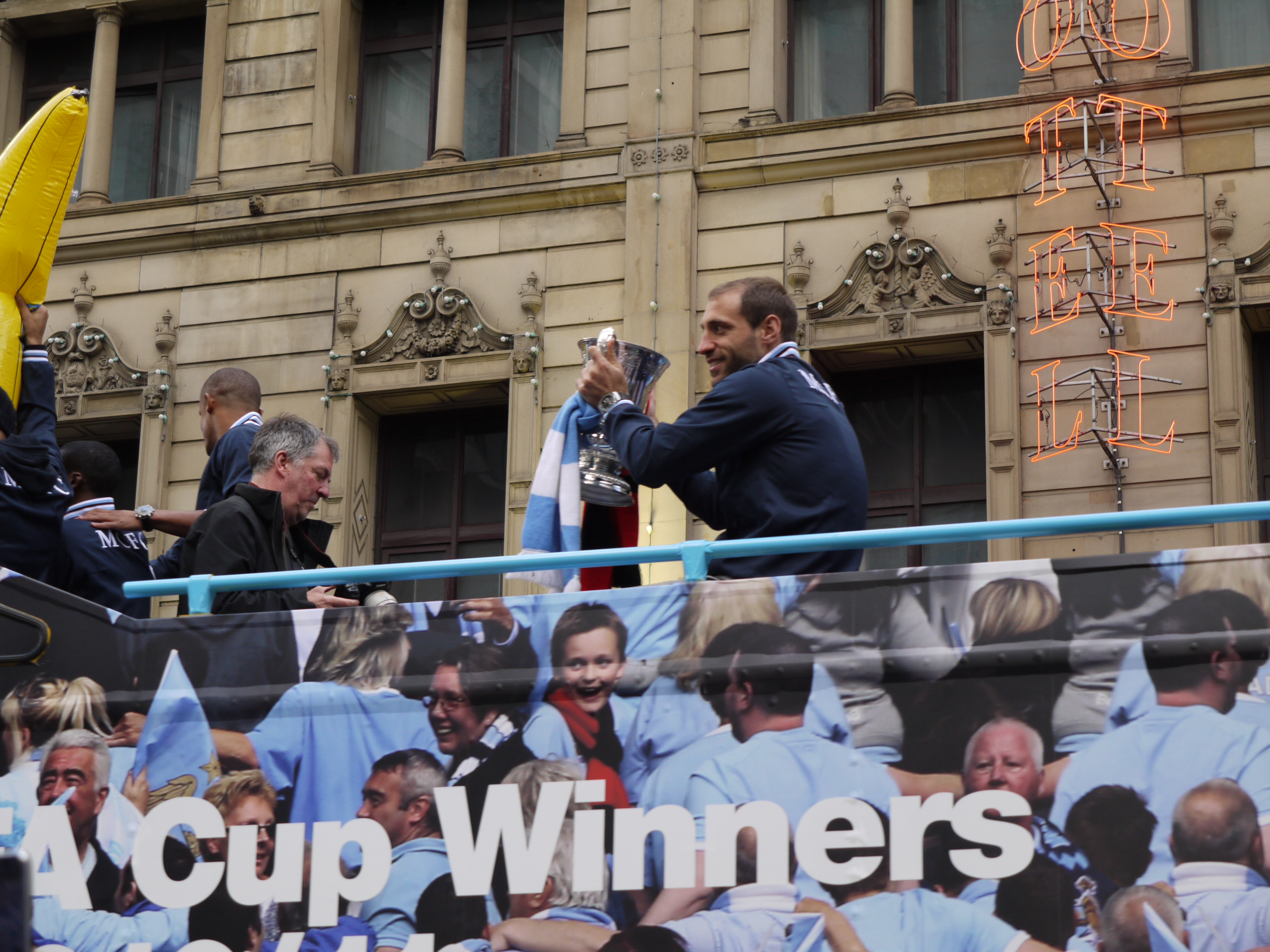
Zabaleta with the FA Cup on Manchester City's 2011 victory parade in May 2011

San Lorenzo

- Copa Sudamericana: 2002

Espanyol

- Copa del Rey: 2005–06
- UEFA Cup runner-up: 2006–07

Manchester City

- Premier League: 2011–12, 2013–14
- FA Cup: 2010–11; runner-up: 2012–13
- Football League Cup: 2013–14, 2015–16
- FA Community Shield: 2012

Argentina Youth

- FIFA U-20 World Cup: 2005
- South American U-20 Championship: 2003

Argentina U23

- Summer Olympics: 2008

Argentina

- FIFA World Cup runner-up: 2014
- Copa América runner-up: 2015

Individual

- PFA Team of the Year: 2012–13 Premier League
- Manchester City Player of the Year: 2012–13
- Manchester City Player of the Month: January 2009, December 2012, January 2013
- FIFPro World XI 5th team: 2013, 2014
