= Matija Nastasić =

Serbian footballer (born 1993)

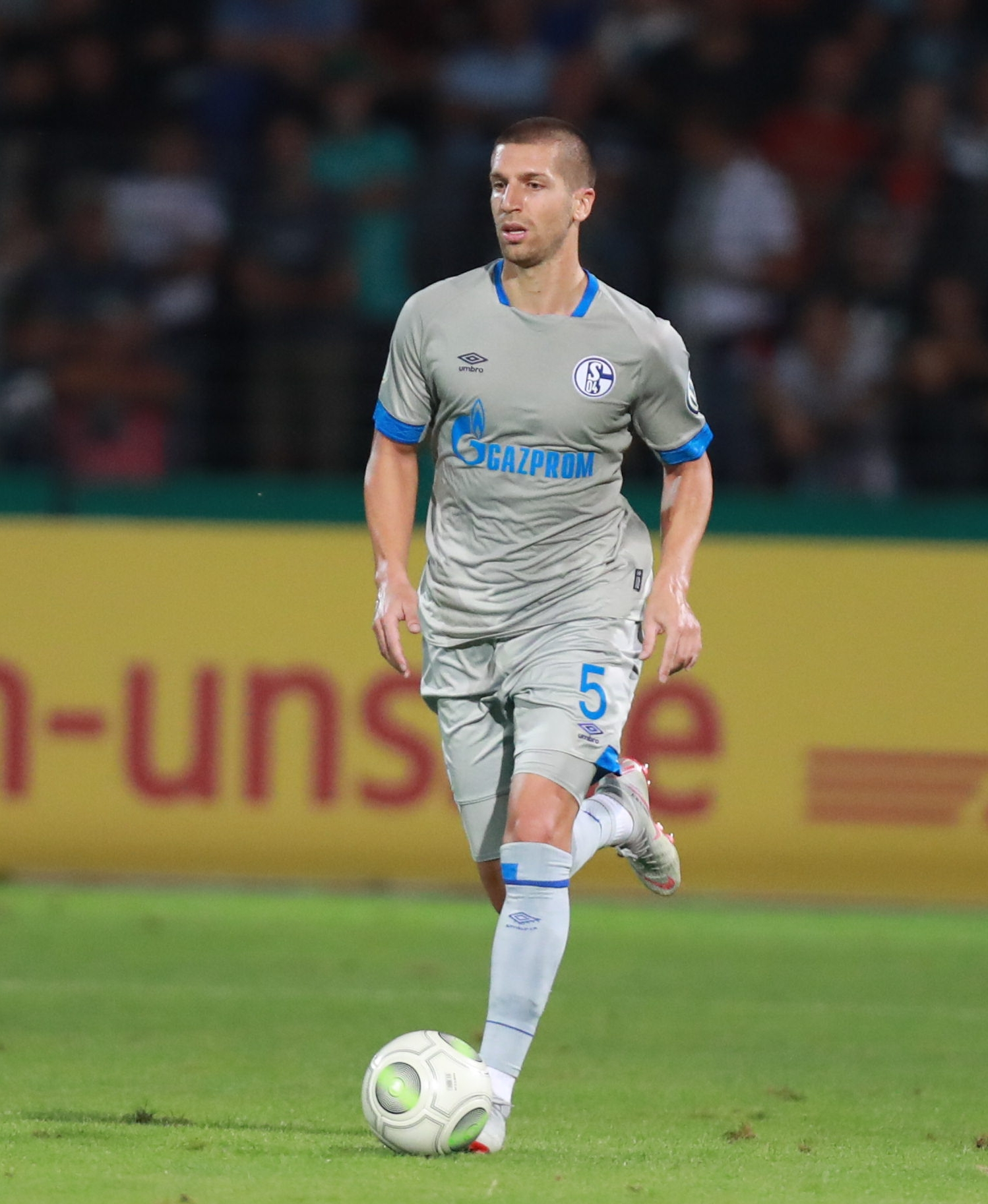
- Nastasić with Schalke 04 in 2018

Personal information
- Full name: Matija Nastasić
- Date of birth: 28 March 1993 (age 33)
- Place of birth: Valjevo, Serbia, FR Yugoslavia
- Height: 1.88 m (6 ft 2 in)
- Position: Centre-back

Team information
- Current team: Al-Ula
- Number: 15

Youth career
- 2000–2008: ZSK Valjevo
- 2008–2010: Partizan

Senior career*
Years	Team	Apps	(Gls)
2010–2011	Partizan	0	(0)
2010–2011	→ Teleoptik (loan)	21	(0)
2011–2012	Fiorentina	26	(2)
2012–2014	Manchester City	34	(0)
2015–2021	Schalke 04	122	(1)
2021–2022	Fiorentina	5	(0)
2022–2024	Mallorca	40	(2)
2024–2025	Leganés	26	(1)
2025–	Al-Ula	19	(3)

International career^{‡}
2009–2010	Serbia U17	9	(2)
2010–2011	Serbia U19	3	(0)
2011–2013	Serbia U21	6	(1)
2012–2022	Serbia	34	(0)
- * Club domestic league appearances and goals as of 22:44, 11 February 2026 (UTC) ‡ National team caps and goals as of 29 March 2022

Matija Nastasić (Serbian Cyrillic: Матија Настасић; born 28 March 1993) is a Serbian professional footballer who plays as a centre-back for Saudi First Division League club Al-Ula.

He began his career at Partizan, and after a loan to Teleoptik joined Italian side Fiorentina in 2011. After one season there he transferred to Manchester City for €15 million and a swap with Stefan Savić, winning the Premier League in 2014, despite injury problems. In 2015, he joined Schalke, where he remained for seven years, before returning to Fiorentina in 2021.

Nastasić made his senior international debut for Serbia in 2012, and has gone on to earn over 30 caps.

== Club career ==
=== Partizan ===
Matija Nastasić is a product of Partizan youth academy. Unable to find space in the Partizan first team setup, he was sent out on loan to Serbian second division side FK Teleoptik from Zemun. There, the young, left footed centre back made 21 appearances and caught the eye of Fiorentina sporting director at that time, Pantaleo Corvino, who signed him in a deal for €4 million.

=== Fiorentina ===
Nastasić spent some time in the Fiorentina youth side but, due to a lack of quality centre backs in the squad and suspensions and injuries, he trained with the first team on many occasions. Fellow Serbian and Fiorentina manager Siniša Mihajlović handed him his Serie A debut on 11 September 2011 in a 2–0 win against Bologna. He went on to make a further 25 appearances that season but one stood out more than any and it was during this performance that he announced himself to Italian and World football. It was a match between La Viola and Milan at the Stadio Artemio Franchi. Nastasić showed many of his qualities – tackling, comfort on the ball, tactical astuteness. It was these qualities that led to a deadline day transfer to English side Manchester City in a move worth €24.4 million, excluding the value of Stefan Savić who was given to Fiorentina as part of the exchange.

=== Manchester City ===
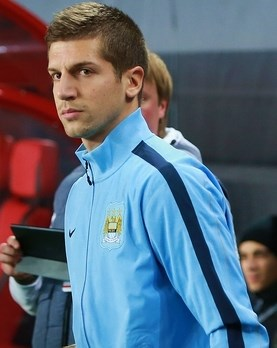
Nastasić with Manchester City in 2013

Nastasić signed a five-year contract with Manchester City, ending on 30 June 2017. He was part of an exchange deal with Stefan Savić. He made his debut for the club on 18 September 2012, starting in a Champions League away fixture against Real Madrid at the Santiago Bernabéu Stadium. He made his Premier League debut on 29 September in a 2–1 win against Fulham. He cemented his place in the starting XI and his great form won him the club's Player of the Month Award for November. Quickly becoming a fan favourite, the youngster pushed 30-year-old Joleon Lescott out of the starting lineup in centre-back position and was selected to start in the 2013 FA Cup Final, a 1–0 defeat by Wigan Athletic. In May 2013, he was named Manchester City's Young Player of the Season.

Nastasić had a less successful season in 2013–14, missing the majority of the campaign through injury. He made 13 league appearances and Manchester City won the Premier League title.

=== Schalke 04 ===
On 13 January 2015, having not featured for City during the season, he was loaned to German club Schalke 04 for its remainder. He made his debut on 31 January, starting in a 1–0 home win over Hannover 96. Having not featured in the Champions League that season, he featured in both legs of Schalke's elimination by Real Madrid in the Last 16.

On 11 March 2015, Schalke 04 activated the transfer clause on his loan deal, believed to be €12 million, and Nastasić signed a four-year contract with the German club.

On 8 August 2015, Nastasić marked his season debut by scoring his first goal for the club, in a 5–0 win at MSV Duisburg in the first round of the DFB-Pokal.

In June 2018, along with goalkeeper Ralf Fährmann, Nastasić sign a contract extension with Schalke to stay with the club until the summer of 2022.

=== Return to Fiorentina ===
In August 2021, Nastasić signed for Fiorentina again following Schalke 04's relegation from the Bundesliga as a replacement for Germán Pezzella, who moved to Real Betis Balompie the same week.

=== Mallorca ===
On 1 September 2022, Nastasić signed a one-year contract with Mallorca in Spain, with an option to extend. On 26 April 2023, he scored his first goal for Mallorca against Atlético Madrid, a header from a corner kick.

On 1 September 2023, free agent Nastasić returned to Mallorca again on a one-year deal.

=== Leganés ===
On 30 August 2024, Nastasić joined fellow Spanish top tier side Leganés on a two-year contract. Nastasić scored the only goal in 1-0 win over Atletico Madrid on 18th of January 2025.

=== Al-Ula ===
On 21 August 2025, Nastasić joined Saudi First Division League club Al-Ula.

== International career ==
Having represented Serbian youth football teams, Nastasić made his debut for the senior squad on 29 February 2012 in a friendly match against Cyprus. He was named in Serbia's preliminary squad for the 2018 FIFA World Cup in Russia, but did not appear in the 23-man final squad. As of January 2025, he earned a total of 34 caps.(no goals)

== Career statistics ==
=== Club ===
As of match played 18 January 2025

Appearances and goals by club, season and competition
Club	Season	League			National cup (Note: Includes Coppa Italia, FA Cup, DFB-Pokal, Copa del Rey)		Europe		Other		Total	
Club	Season	Division	Apps	Goals	Apps	Goals	Apps	Goals	Apps	Goals	Apps	Goals
Teleoptik	2009–10	Serbian First League	9	0	—		—		—		9	0
Teleoptik	2010–11	Serbian First League	12	0	0	0	—		—		12	0
Teleoptik	Total		21	0	0	0	—		—		21	0
Fiorentina	2011–12	Serie A	25	2	2	0	—		—		27	2
Fiorentina	2012–13	Serie A	1	0	1	0	—		—		2	0
Fiorentina	Total		26	2	3	0	—		—		29	2
Manchester City	2012–13	Premier League	21	0	3	0	5 (Note: Appearances in UEFA Champions League)	0	1 (Note: Appearance in League Cup)	0	30	0
Manchester City	2013–14	Premier League	13	0	2	0	4	0	1	0	20	0
Manchester City	2014–15	Premier League	0	0	0	0	0	0	1 (Note: Appearance in FA Community Shield)	0	1	0
Manchester City	Total		34	0	5	0	9	0	3	0	51	0
Schalke 04	2014–15	Bundesliga	16	0	0	0	2	0	—		18	0
Schalke 04	2015–16	Bundesliga	1	0	1	1	0	0	—		2	1
Schalke 04	2016–17	Bundesliga	22	0	3	0	10 (Note: Appearances in UEFA Europa League)	0	—		35	0
Schalke 04	2017–18	Bundesliga	24	0	3	0	—		—		27	0
Schalke 04	2018–19	Bundesliga	28	1	3	0	6	0	—		37	1
Schalke 04	2019–20	Bundesliga	16	0	4	0	—		—		20	0
Schalke 04	2020–21	Bundesliga	15	0	3	0	—		—		18	0
Schalke 04	Total		122	1	17	1	18	0	—		157	2
Fiorentina	2021–22	Serie A	5	0	1	0	1 (Note: Appearance in UEFA Conference League)	0	—		7	0
Mallorca	2022–23	La Liga	14	1	3	0	—		—		17	1
Mallorca	2023–24	La Liga	26	2	6	0	—		—		32	2
Mallorca	Total		40	3	9	0	—		—		49	3
Leganés	2024–25	La Liga	15	1	2	0	—		—		17	1
Career total			263	7	37	1	28	0	3	0	331	8

=== International ===
As of match played 29 March 2022

Appearances and goals by national team and year
National team	Year	Apps	Goals
Serbia	2012	6	0
Serbia	2013	7	0
Serbia	2014	3	0
Serbia	2015	3	0
Serbia	2016	4	0
Serbia	2017	3	0
Serbia	2018	1	0
Serbia	2019	1	0
Serbia	2020	0	0
Serbia	2021	4	0
Serbia	2022	2	0
Total		34	0

== Honours ==
Manchester City

- Premier League: 2013–14
- FA Cup runner-up: 2012–13

Individual

- Manchester City Young Player of the Year: 2012–13
