= 2014–15 Manchester City F.C. season =

English football club season

Manchester City
2014–15 season
- Owner: City Football Group
- Chairman: Khaldoon Al Mubarak
- Manager: Manuel Pellegrini
- Stadium: Etihad Stadium
- Premier League: 2nd
- FA Cup: Fourth round
- League Cup: Fourth round
- FA Community Shield: Runners-up
- UEFA Champions League: Round of 16
- Top goalscorer: League: Sergio Agüero (26); All: Sergio Agüero (32)
- Highest home attendance: 45,622 (vs. Stoke City, 30 August 2014, Premier League)
- Lowest home attendance: 32,346 (vs. Sheffield Wednesday, 24 September 2014, League Cup)
Home colours	Away colours	Third colours

The 2014–15 season was Manchester City Football Club's 113th season in existence, 86th season in the top division of English football and 18th season in the Premier League. In addition to the league, Manchester City participated in this season's editions of the FA Cup, League Cup, Community Shield and UEFA Champions League.

== Kits ==
Supplier: Nike / Sponsor: Etihad Airways

Home	Home alt.	Away	Third	Goalkeeper 1	Goalkeeper 2	Goalkeeper 3

=== Kit information ===
The club entered the season being in the second year of a deal with the American manufacturer Nike, who would supply their kits until 2019.

- Home: The new home kit remained broadly the same as the previous season. The main change related to the trim of the shirt, switching from white and navy stripes to thick navy blue bands on the neck and arms. In addition to this, sky blue shorts were used instead of the traditional white shorts.
- Away: The away kit featured a fading pattern, running from navy blue to mid-blue, which were combined with yellow applications. The shorts and socks were navy blue as well.
- Third: The third kit was in two shades of purple with a darker shade used on the collar and back of the strip, in line with Nike's new template used by its top teams. The two shades were separated by luminous yellow flashes.
- Goalkeeper: Three goalkeeper strips were revealed for the 2014–15 campaign, with the first and second-choice strips being essentially negatives of each other. The primary kit was mainly yellow with a light green band on each arm surrounded by a white gradient pattern, the secondary kit was mainly green with a yellow band on each arm which was surrounded by a similar fading pattern, and the third kit was mainly black with red bands and the same gradient pattern.

== Non-competitive ==
=== Pre-season ===
==== Friendlies ====
13 July 2014 Friendly	Dundee	2–0	Manchester City	Dundee, Scotland
16:00 BST (UTC+01:00)	Harkins 26'; Boyata 38' (o.g.)	Report		Stadium: Dens Park; Attendance: 6,859

18 July 2014 Friendly	Hearts	1–2	Manchester City	Edinburgh, Scotland
19:30 BST (UTC+01:00)	Sow 56'	Report	Sinclair 25'; Kolarov 80' (pen.)	Stadium: Tynecastle Stadium

==== Summer in the Soccer Capital – Champions Shield ====
23 July 2014 Friendly	Sporting Kansas City	1–4	Manchester City	Kansas City, United States
20:15 CDT; 02:15 BST	Sapong 30'	Report	Zuculini 3'; Boyata 45'; Kolarov 72' (pen.); Iheanacho 88'	Stadium: Sporting Park; Attendance: 18,484

==== 2014 International Champions Cup ====
===== Group B =====
Pos	Team	Pld	W	WP	LP	L	GF	GA	GD	Pts	Qualification
1	(England) Liverpool	3	2	1	0	0	5	2	+3	8	Advance to Final
2	(Greece) Olympiacos	3	1	1	0	1	5	3	+2	5	
3	(England) Manchester City	3	1	0	2	0	9	5	+4	5	
4	(Italy) Milan	3	0	0	0	3	1	10	−9	0	

Source: International Champions Cup
Rules for classification: 1) points; 2) head-to-head result; 3) goal difference; 4) goals scored

27 July 2014 Friendly	Milan	1–5	Manchester City	Pittsburgh, United States
16:00 EDT (UTC-04:00)	Muntari 42'	Report	Jovetić 11', 58'; Sinclair 14'; Navas 23'; Iheanacho 26'	Stadium: Heinz Field; Attendance: 34,347; Referee: Armando Villarreal

30 July 2014 Friendly	Manchester City	2–2 (1–3 p)	Liverpool	New York City, United States
19:00 EDT (UTC-04:00)	Jovetić 53', 67'	Report	Henderson 59'; Sterling 85'	Stadium: Yankee Stadium
	Penalties
	Kolarov (penalty missed); Touré (penalty missed); Navas (penalty missed); Iheanacho (penalty scored)		(penalty missed) Sturridge; (penalty scored) Can; (penalty scored) Henderson; (penalty scored) Lucas

2 August 2014 Friendly	Olympiacos	2–2 (5–4 p)	Manchester City	Minneapolis, United States
14:00 CDT (UTC-05:00)	Diamantakos 37', 66'	Report	Jovetić 35'; Kolarov 89' (pen.)	Stadium: TCF Bank Stadium
	Penalties
	Samaris (penalty scored); Dossevi (penalty missed); Kolovos (penalty scored); Ghazaryan (penalty scored); Papadopoulos (penalty missed); Bouchalakis (penalty scored); Papazoglou (penalty scored)		(penalty scored) Silva; (penalty scored) Kolarov; (penalty missed) Milner; (penalty missed) Sinclair; (penalty scored) Zuculini; (penalty scored) Guidetti; (penalty missed) Richards

=== Mid-season ===
==== Friendlies ====
21 January 2015 Friendly	Manchester City	2–0	Hamburg	Al Ain, United Arab Emirates
15:30 GMT (UTC+00:00)	Mangala (yellow card) 24'; Jovetić 50'; Džeko 74'	Report		Stadium: Hazza Bin Zayed Stadium

=== Post-season ===
==== Friendlies ====
28 May 2015 Friendly	Toronto FC	0–1	Manchester City	Toronto, Canada
12:00		Report	Evans 84'	Stadium: BMO Field; Attendance: 23,169; Referee: Drew Fischer

== Competitions ==
=== Overall ===
Competition	Started round	Final position / round	First match	Last match
FA Community Shield	Final	Runners–up	10 August 2014	
Premier League	—	Runners-up	17 August 2014	24 May 2015
League Cup	Third round	Fourth round	24 September 2014	29 October 2014
FA Cup	Third round	Fourth round	3 January 2015	24 January 2015
UEFA Champions League	Group stage	Round of 16	17 September 2014	18 March 2015

Updated to match played 25 May 2015
Source: Competitions

=== FA Community Shield ===
10 August 2014	Arsenal	3–0	Manchester City	London
15:00 BST	Cazorla 22'; Ramsey 43'; Giroud 62'	Report	Fernando (yellow card) 51'	Stadium: Wembley Stadium; Attendance: 71,523; Referee: Michael Oliver

=== Premier League ===
==== League table ====
Pos	Team	Pld	W	D	L	GF	GA	GD	Pts	Qualification or relegation
1	Chelsea (C)	38	26	9	3	73	32	+41	87	Qualification for the Champions League group stage
2	Manchester City	38	24	7	7	83	38	+45	79	Qualification for the Champions League group stage
3	Arsenal	38	22	9	7	71	36	+35	75	Qualification for the Champions League group stage
4	Manchester United	38	20	10	8	62	37	+25	70	Qualification for the Champions League play-off round
5	Tottenham Hotspur	38	19	7	12	58	53	+5	64	Qualification for the Europa League group stage (Note: Since winners of the 2014–15 FA Cup, Arsenal, and winners of the 2014–15 Football League Cup, Chelsea, qualified for the Champions League based on league position, the spot awarded to the FA Cup winners (Europa League group stage) was passed to the sixth-placed team, Liverpool, and the spot awarded to the League Cup winners (Europa League third qualifying round) was passed to the seventh-placed team, Southampton, since those teams were the first teams in the table not already qualified for any European competition.)

Source: Barclays Premier League
Rules for classification: 1) Points; 2) Goal difference; 3) Goals scored; 4) Play-offs (only if needed to decide champion, teams for relegation or teams for UEFA competitions).
(C) Champions

==== Results summary ====
Overall								Home						Away					
Pld	W	D	L	GF	GA	GD	Pts	W	D	L	GF	GA	GD	W	D	L	GF	GA	GD
38	24	7	7	83	38	+45	79	14	3	2	44	14	+30	10	4	5	39	24	+15

Last updated: 25 May 2015.
Source: Premier League

==== Results by matchday ====
Matchday	1	2	3	4	5	6	7	8	9	10	11	12	13	14	15	16	17	18	19	20	21	22	23	24	25	26	27	28	29	30	31	32	33	34	35	36	37	38
Ground	A	H	H	A	H	A	A	H	A	H	A	H	A	A	H	A	H	A	H	H	A	H	A	H	A	H	A	H	A	H	A	A	H	H	A	H	A	H
Result	W	W	L	D	D	W	W	W	L	W	D	W	W	W	W	W	W	W	D	W	D	L	D	D	W	W	L	W	L	W	L	L	W	W	W	W	W	W
Position	1	2	4	5	6	3	2	2	3	3	3	3	2	2	2	2	2	2	2	1	2	2	2	2	2	2	2	2	2	2	4	4	4	2	2	2	2	2
Points	3	6	6	7	8	11	14	17	17	20	21	24	27	30	33	36	39	42	43	46	47	47	48	49	52	55	55	58	58	61	61	61	64	67	70	73	76	79

Updated to match(es) played on 25 May 2015. Source: Statto.com
A = Away; H = Home; W = Win; D = Draw; L = Loss

==== Matches ====
17 August 2014 1	Newcastle United	0–2	Manchester City	Newcastle
16:00 BST	Janmaat (yellow card) 77'	Report	Silva (yellow card) 34', (goal) 38'; Demichelis (yellow card) 54'; Kolarov (yellow card) 57'; Kompany (yellow card) 75'; Fernando (yellow card) 87'; Agüero 90+2'	Stadium: St James' Park; Attendance: 50,816; Referee: Martin Atkinson

25 August 2014 2	Manchester City	3–1	Liverpool	Manchester
20:00 BST	Touré (yellow card) 29'; Jovetić 41', 55'; Agüero 69'	Report	Can (yellow card) 76'; Zabaleta 83' (o.g.)	Stadium: Etihad Stadium; Attendance: 45,471; Referee: Michael Oliver

30 August 2014 3	Manchester City	0–1	Stoke City	Manchester
15:00 BST	Fernandinho (yellow card) 53'; Touré (yellow card) 87'	Report	Bardsley (yellow card) 22'; Diouf 58'	Stadium: Etihad Stadium; Attendance: 45,622; Referee: Lee Mason

13 September 2014 4	Arsenal	2–2	Manchester City	London
12:45 BST	Flamini (yellow card) 58'; Monreal (yellow card) 62'; Wilshere 63'; Sánchez 74', (yellow card) 75'	Report	Lampard (yellow card) 22'; Zabaleta (yellow card) 24'; Agüero 28', (yellow card) 64'; Fernandinho (yellow card) 58'; Demichelis 83'	Stadium: Emirates Stadium; Attendance: 60,003; Referee: Mark Clattenburg

21 September 2014 5	Manchester City	1–1	Chelsea	Manchester
16:00 BST	Fernandinho (yellow card) 12'; Zabaleta (yellow card) 32' (yellow-red card) 66'; Silva (yellow card) 40'; Touré (yellow card) 44'; Lampard 85'	Report	Ramires (yellow card) 35'; Matić (yellow card) 39'; Costa (yellow card) 66'; Schürrle 71'; Ivanović (yellow card) 77'	Stadium: Etihad Stadium; Attendance: 45,602; Referee: Mike Dean

27 September 2014 6	Hull City	2–4	Manchester City	Hull
15:00 BST	Mangala 21' (o.g.); Hernández 32' (pen.)	Report	Agüero 7'; Džeko 11', 68'; Mangala (yellow card) 31'; Clichy (yellow card) 84'; Lampard 87'	Stadium: KC Stadium; Attendance: 22,859; Referee: Anthony Taylor

4 October 2014 7	Aston Villa	0–2	Manchester City	Birmingham
17:30 BST		Report	Kolarov (yellow card) 24'; Touré 82'; Agüero 88'	Stadium: Villa Park; Attendance: 32,964; Referee: Chris Foy

18 October 2014 8	Manchester City	4–1	Tottenham Hotspur	Manchester
12:45 BST	Agüero 13', 20' (pen.), 68' (pen.), 75'; Navas (yellow card) 55'	Report	Eriksen 15'; Mason (yellow card) 33'; Dier (yellow card) 37'; Fazio (red card) 67'	Stadium: Etihad Stadium; Attendance: 45,549; Referee: Jonathan Moss

25 October 2014 9	West Ham United	2–1	Manchester City	London
12:45 BST	Amalfitano (yellow card) 7', (goal) 21'; Song (yellow card) 47'; Sakho 75'	Report	Kompany (yellow card) 44'; Silva 77'	Stadium: Boleyn Ground; Attendance: 34,977; Referee: Martin Atkinson

2 November 2014 10	Manchester City	1–0	Manchester United	Manchester
13:30 GMT	Demichelis (yellow card) 60'; Agüero 63'; Zabaleta (yellow card) 77'; Fernando (yellow card) 79'	Report	Blind (yellow card) 28'; Smalling (yellow card) 31' (yellow-red card) 39'	Stadium: Etihad Stadium; Attendance: 45,358; Referee: Michael Oliver

8 November 2014 11	Queens Park Rangers	2–2	Manchester City	London
17:30 GMT	Sandro (yellow card) 19'; Austin 21'; Isla (yellow card) 37'; Dunne (yellow card) 40'; Vargas (yellow card) 45+2'; Demichelis 76' (o.g.)	Report	Agüero 32', 83'; Nasri (yellow card) 45+3'; Sagna (yellow card) 55'	Stadium: Loftus Road; Attendance: 18,005; Referee: Mike Dean

22 November 2014 12	Manchester City	2–1	Swansea City	Manchester
15:00 GMT	Jovetić 19'; Kompany (yellow card) 31'; Touré 62'; Demichelis (yellow card) 90+1'	Report	Bony 9'; Bartley (yellow card) 24'	Stadium: Etihad Stadium; Attendance: 45,448; Referee: Neil Swarbrick

30 November 2014 13	Southampton	0–3	Manchester City	Southampton
13:30 GMT	Wanyama (yellow card) 7'	Report	Agüero (yellow card) 9'; Touré 51'; Mangala (yellow card) 22' (yellow-red card) 74'; Lampard 80'; Kompany (yellow card) 81'; Clichy 88'	Stadium: St Mary's Stadium; Attendance: 30,919; Referee: Mike Jones

3 December 2014 14	Sunderland	1–4	Manchester City	Sunderland
19:45 GMT	Wickham 19'; Cattermole (yellow card) 71'	Report	Agüero 21', 71'; Jovetić 39'; Zabaleta 55'; Boyata (yellow card) 65'	Stadium: Stadium of Light; Attendance: 41,152; Referee: Craig Pawson

6 December 2014 15	Manchester City	1–0	Everton	Manchester
17:30 GMT	Mangala (yellow card) 18'; Touré 24' (pen.), (yellow card) 88'; Fernando (yellow card) 26'	Report	Coleman (yellow card) 11'; Barry (yellow card) 52'; Barkley (yellow card) 90'	Stadium: Etihad Stadium; Attendance: 45,603; Referee: Andre Marriner

13 December 2014 16	Leicester City	0–1	Manchester City	Leicester
15:00 GMT		Report	Lampard 40'; Nasri (yellow card) 70'; Hart (yellow card) 78'	Stadium: King Power Stadium; Attendance: 31,643; Referee: Jonathan Moss

20 December 2014 17	Manchester City	3–0	Crystal Palace	Manchester
12:45 GMT	Kolarov (yellow card) 36'; Silva 49', 61'; Milner (yellow card) 79'; Touré 81'	Report	Puncheon (yellow card) 41'	Stadium: Etihad Stadium; Attendance: 45,302; Referee: Phil Dowd

26 December 2014 18	West Bromwich Albion	1–3	Manchester City	West Bromwich
15:00 GMT	Ideye 87'	Report	Fernando 8', (yellow card) 84'; Touré 13' (pen.); Silva 34'	Stadium: The Hawthorns; Attendance: 26,040; Referee: Mark Clattenburg

28 December 2014 19	Manchester City	2–2	Burnley	Manchester
15:00 GMT	Silva 23', (yellow card) 88'; Fernandinho 33'; Fernando (yellow card) 42'; Navas (yellow card) 79'; Zabaleta (yellow card) 81'	Report	Boyd 47'; Mee (yellow card) 71'; Barnes 81'	Stadium: Etihad Stadium; Attendance: 45,608; Referee: Kevin Friend

1 January 2015 20	Manchester City	3–2	Sunderland	Manchester
15:00 GMT	Nasri (yellow card) 51'; Touré 57'; Jovetić 66'; Zabaleta (yellow card) 71'; Lampard 73'	Report	Jones (yellow card) 17'; Larsson (yellow card) 34'; Rodwell 68'; Johnson 71' (pen.); Brown (yellow card) 88'	Stadium: Etihad Stadium; Attendance: 45,367; Referee: Roger East

10 January 2015 21	Everton	1–1	Manchester City	Liverpool
15:00 GMT	Stones (yellow card) 63'; Naismith 78'	Report	Mangala (yellow card) 50'; Fernandinho (yellow card) 69', (goal) 74'	Stadium: Goodison Park; Attendance: 39,499; Referee: Martin Atkinson

18 January 2015 22	Manchester City	0–2	Arsenal	Manchester
16:00 GMT	Kompany (yellow card) 41'; Fernandinho (yellow card) 54'; Agüero (yellow card) 86'	Report	Koscielny (yellow card) 3'; Cazorla 24' (pen.); Ramsey (yellow card) 38'; Bellerín (yellow card) 56'; Giroud 67'	Stadium: Etihad Stadium; Attendance: 45,596; Referee: Mike Dean

31 January 2015 23	Chelsea	1–1	Manchester City	London
17:30 GMT	Rémy 41'	Report	Silva 45', (yellow card) 52'; Fernando (yellow card) 74'	Stadium: Stamford Bridge; Attendance: 41,620; Referee: Mark Clattenburg

7 February 2015 24	Manchester City	1–1	Hull City	Manchester
15:00 GMT	Nasri (yellow card) 78'; Fernandinho (yellow card) 85'; Milner 90+2'	Report	Meyler 35'; Elmohamady (yellow card) 60'; Dawson (yellow card) 68'; Livermore (yellow card) 68'; Huddlestone (yellow card) 90+1'	Stadium: Etihad Stadium; Attendance: 45,233; Referee: Jonathan Moss

11 February 2015 25	Stoke City	1–4	Manchester City	Stoke-on-Trent
19:45 GMT	Crouch 38'; Arnautović (yellow card) 64'	Report	Agüero 33', 70' (pen.), (yellow card) 45'; Milner (yellow card) 52', (goal) 55'; Nasri 76'	Stadium: Britannia Stadium; Attendance: 27,011; Referee: Lee Mason

21 February 2015 26	Manchester City	5–0	Newcastle United	Manchester
17:30 GMT	Agüero 2' (pen.); Nasri 12'; Džeko 21', (yellow card) 82'; Kompany (yellow card) 37'; Touré (yellow card) 39'; Silva 51', 53'	Report	Anita (yellow card) 1'; Colback (yellow card) 29'	Stadium: Etihad Stadium; Attendance: 45,602; Referee: Chris Foy

1 March 2015 27	Liverpool	2–1	Manchester City	Liverpool
12:00 GMT	Henderson 11'; Coutinho 75'; Lallana (yellow card) 84'	Report	Džeko 26'; Nasri (yellow card) 57'; Milner (yellow card) 82'; Bony (yellow card) 86'	Stadium: Anfield; Attendance: 44,590; Referee: Mark Clattenburg

4 March 2015 28	Manchester City	2–0	Leicester City	Manchester
19:45 GMT	Silva 45+2'; Milner 88'	Report	Konchesky (yellow card) 36'	Stadium: Etihad Stadium; Attendance: 45,000; Referee: Robert Madley

14 March 2015 29	Burnley	1–0	Manchester City	Burnley
17:30 GMT	Mee (yellow card) 58'; Boyd 61'; Duff (yellow card) 71'	Report	Demichelis (yellow card) 60'	Stadium: Turf Moor; Attendance: 21,216; Referee: Andre Marriner

21 March 2015 30	Manchester City	3–0	West Bromwich Albion	Manchester
12:45 GMT	Bony 27'; Fernando 40'; Silva 77'	Report	McAuley (red card) 2'	Stadium: Etihad Stadium; Attendance: 45,018; Referee: Neil Swarbrick

6 April 2015 31	Crystal Palace	2–1	Manchester City	London
20:00 BST	Murray 34'; Delaney (yellow card) 40'; Puncheon 48', (yellow card) 57'	Report	Demichelis (yellow card) 68'; Touré 78'	Stadium: Selhurst Park; Attendance: 24,718; Referee: Michael Oliver

12 April 2015 32	Manchester United	4–2	Manchester City	Manchester
16:00 BST	Young 14'; Fellaini 27'; Mata 67'; Smalling 73'	Report	Agüero 8', 89'; Milner (yellow card) 24'; Silva (yellow card) 34'; Kompany (yellow card) 44'	Stadium: Old Trafford; Attendance: 75,313; Referee: Mark Clattenburg

19 April 2015 33	Manchester City	2–0	West Ham United	Manchester
13:30 BST	Collins 18' (o.g.); Navas (yellow card) 35'; Agüero 36'; Silva (yellow card) 58'	Report	Kouyaté (yellow card) 67'; Downing (yellow card) 90+7'	Stadium: Etihad Stadium; Attendance: 45,041; Referee: Anthony Taylor

25 April 2015 34	Manchester City	3–2	Aston Villa	Manchester
17:30 BST	Agüero 3'; Silva (yellow card) 46'; Kolarov 66'; Fernandinho 89'	Report	Westwood (yellow card) 62'; Sánchez (yellow card) 65', (goal) 85'; Cleverley 68'	Stadium: Etihad Stadium; Attendance: 45,036; Referee: Mike Dean

3 May 2015 35	Tottenham Hotspur	0–1	Manchester City	London
16:00 BST	Bentaleb (yellow card) 42'; Mason (yellow card) 45+1'; Kane (yellow card) 90+5'	Report	Agüero 29'; Milner (yellow card) 41'; Zabaleta (yellow card) 68'; Kolarov (yellow card) 74'; Silva (yellow card) 82'	Stadium: White Hart Lane; Attendance: 35,784; Referee: Andre Marriner

10 May 2015 36	Manchester City	6–0	Queens Park Rangers	Manchester
13:30 BST	Agüero 4', 50', 65' (pen.); Kolarov 32'; Milner 70'; Silva 87'	Report	Barton (yellow card) 62'	Stadium: Etihad Stadium; Attendance: 44,564; Referee: Mike Dean

17 May 2015 37	Swansea City	2–4	Manchester City	Swansea
13:30 BST	Sigurðsson 45'; Gomis 64'	Report	Touré 21', 74'; Milner 36', (yellow card) 50'; Zabaleta (yellow card) 61'; Fernandinho (yellow card) 77'; Bony 90+2'	Stadium: Liberty Stadium; Attendance: 20,669; Referee: Mark Clattenburg

24 May 2015 38	Manchester City	2–0	Southampton	Manchester
15:00 BST	Lampard 31'; Agüero 88'; Demichelis (yellow card) 2'	Report	Long (yellow card) 25'	Stadium: Etihad Stadium; Attendance: 45,919; Referee: Chris Foy

=== FA Cup ===
3 January 2015 Third round	Manchester City	2–1	Sheffield Wednesday	Manchester
15:00 GMT (UTC+00:00)	Milner 66', 90'	Report	Nuhiu 14'	Stadium: Etihad Stadium; Attendance: 44,309; Referee: Michael Oliver

24 January 2015 Fourth round	Manchester City	0–2	Middlesbrough	Manchester
15:00 GMT	Kompany (yellow card) --'; Fernandinho (yellow card) --'	Report	Bamford 53'; Kike 90+3'	Stadium: Etihad Stadium; Attendance: 44,836; Referee: Phil Dowd

=== League Cup ===
24 September 2014 Third round	Manchester City	7–0	Sheffield Wednesday	Manchester
19:45 BST (UTC+01:00)	Lampard 47', 90'; Džeko 53', 77'; Navas 54'; Touré 60' (pen.); Pozo 88'; Mangala (yellow card) --'	Report	Zayatte (red card) 59'	Stadium: City of Manchester Stadium; Attendance: 32,346; Referee: Paul Tierney

29 October 2014 Fourth round	Manchester City	0–2	Newcastle United	Manchester
19:45 GMT (UTC±00:00)	Mangala (yellow card) 69'; Agüero (yellow card) 74'; Milner (yellow card) 84'	BBC Report	Aarons 6'; Dummett (yellow card) 26'; Sissoko 75'; Ameobi (yellow card) 90+1'	Stadium: City of Manchester Stadium; Attendance: 40,752; Referee: Stuart Attwell

=== UEFA Champions League ===
==== Group stage ====
Pos	Team	Pld	W	D	L	GF	GA	GD	Pts	Qualification	BAY	MCI	ROM	CSKA
1	(Germany) Bayern Munich	6	5	0	1	16	4	+12	15	Advance to knockout phase	—	1–0	2–0	3–0
2	(England) Manchester City	6	2	2	2	9	8	+1	8	Advance to knockout phase	3–2	—	1–1	1–2
3	(Italy) Roma	6	1	2	3	8	14	−6	5	Transfer to Europa League	1–7	0–2	—	5–1
4	(Russia) CSKA Moscow	6	1	2	3	6	13	−7	5		0–1	2–2	1–1	—

Source: UEFA
Rules for classification: Group stage tiebreakers

17 September 2014 1	Bayern Munich (Germany)	1–0	(England) Manchester City	Munich, Germany
20:45 CEST	Boateng 90'	Report	Džeko (yellow card) 41'; Kompany (yellow card) 45'; Clichy (yellow card) 65'; Demichelis (yellow card) 77'	Stadium: Allianz Arena; Attendance: 68,000; Referee: Alberto Undiano Mallenco (Spain)

30 September 2014 2	Manchester City (England)	1–1	(Italy) Roma	Manchester, England
19:45 BST	Agüero 4' (pen.); Zabaleta (yellow card) 55'	Report	Maicon (yellow card) 4'; Totti 23'; Nainggolan (yellow card) 81'	Stadium: City of Manchester Stadium; Attendance: 37,509; Referee: Björn Kuipers (Netherlands)

21 October 2014 3	CSKA Moscow (Russia)	2–2	(England) Manchester City	Khimki, Russia
18:00 CEST	Doumbia 64'; Natcho 86' (pen.)	Report	Agüero 29'; Milner 38'; Fernando (yellow card) 57'	Stadium: Arena Khimki; Attendance: 0 Referee: Istvan Vad (Hungary)

5 November 2014 4	Manchester City (England)	1–2	(Russia) CSKA Moscow	Manchester, England
19:45 GMT	Touré 8', (yellow card) 66' (red card) 81'; Fernandinho (yellow card) 62' (yellow-red card) 70'; Agüero (yellow card) 90'	Report	Doumbia 2', 34'; Wernbloom (yellow card) 28'; Ignashevich (yellow card) 77'; Alekseevich Eremenko (yellow card) 79'	Stadium: City of Manchester Stadium; Attendance: 45,143; Referee: Anastasios Sidiropoulos (Greece)

25 November 2014 5	Manchester City (England)	3–2	(Germany) Bayern Munich	Manchester, England
19:45 GMT	Agüero 22' (pen.), 85', 90+1', (yellow card) 90+2'; Clichy (yellow card) 60'; Zabaleta (yellow card) 89'	Report	Benatia (red card) 21'; Alonso 40'; Lewandowski 45'; Neuer (yellow card) 78'	Stadium: City of Manchester Stadium; Attendance: 44,510; Referee: Pavel Královec (Czech Republic)

10 December 2014 6	Roma (Italy)	0–2	(England) Manchester City	Rome, Italy
20:45 CET	Yanga-Mbiwa (yellow card) 43'	Report	Džeko (yellow card) 43'; Nasri 60', (yellow card) 74'; Zabaleta 86'	Stadium: Stadio Olimpico; Attendance: 54,119; Referee: Milorad Mažić (Serbia)

==== Knockout stage ====
===== Round of 16 =====
24 February 2015 Round of 16	Manchester City (England)	1–2	(Spain) Barcelona	Manchester, England
19:45 GMT	Clichy (yellow card) 59' (yellow-red card) 74'; Agüero 69'; Fernando (yellow card) 90'	Report	Suárez 16', 30'; Rakitić (yellow card) 41'; Alves (yellow card) 45'; Adriano (yellow card) 88'	Stadium: Etihad Stadium; Attendance: 45,081; Referee: Felix Brych (Germany)

18 March 2015 Round of 16	Barcelona (Spain)	1–0 (3–1 agg.)	(England) Manchester City	Barcelona, Spain
20:45 CET	Rakitić 31'; Alves (yellow card) 80'	Report	Fernandinho (yellow card) 15'; Kolarov (yellow card) 20'; Silva (yellow card) 27'; Nasri (yellow card) 35'; Demichelis (yellow card) 82'	Stadium: Camp Nou; Attendance: 92,551; Referee: Gianluca Rocchi (Italy)

== Squad information ==
=== First team squad ===
N	Pos.	Nat.	Name	Age	EU	Since	App	Goals	Ends	Transfer fee	Notes
1	GK	(England)	Joe Hart	28	EU	2006	300	0	2019	£500,000	
2	RB	(England)	Micah Richards	27	EU	2005	245	10	2015	YS	On loan at Fiorentina
3	RB	(France)	Bacary Sagna	32	EU	2014	16	0	2017	Free	
4	CB	(Belgium)	Vincent Kompany	29	EU	2008	276	12	2019	£6M	Captain
5	RB	(Argentina)	Pablo Zabaleta	30	EU	2008	279	10	2017	£6M	
6	DM	(Brazil)	Fernando	27	EU	2014	33	2	2019	£12M	
7	AM	(England)	James Milner	29	EU	2010	203	18	2015	£24M	
8	AM	(France)	Samir Nasri	28	EU	2011	163	25	2019	£25M	
9	FW	(Spain)	Álvaro Negredo	29	EU	2013	49	23	2017	£20M	On loan at Valencia
10	FW	(Bosnia and Herzegovina)	Edin Džeko	29	Non-EU	2011 (Winter)	189	72	2018	£27M	
11	LB	(Serbia)	Aleksandar Kolarov	29	Non-EU	2010	167	17	2018	£16M	
12	LW	(England)	Scott Sinclair	26	EU	2012	19	0	2016	£6.2M	On loan at Aston Villa
13	GK	(Argentina)	Willy Caballero	33	EU	2014	7	0	2017	£4.4M	
14	FW	(Ivory Coast)	Wilfried Bony	26	Non-EU	2015 (Winter)	12	2	2019	£25M	
15	RW	(Spain)	Jesús Navas	29	EU	2013	95	7	2017	£14.9M	
16	FW	(Argentina)	Sergio Agüero	27	EU	2011	164	107	2019	£35M	
18	CM	(England)	Frank Lampard	37	EU	2014	38	8	2015	Free	On loan from New York City FC
19	CB	(Netherlands)	Karim Rekik	20	EU	2011	3	0	2016	£396,000	On loan at PSV
20	CB	(France)	Eliaquim Mangala	24	EU	2014	31	0	2019	£32M	
21	AM	(Spain)	David Silva	29	EU	2010	224	39	2019	£24M	
22	LB	(France)	Gaël Clichy	29	EU	2011	136	1	2017	£7M	
25	CM	(Brazil)	Fernandinho	30	Non-EU	2013	89	8	2017	£30M	
26	CB	(Argentina)	Martín Demichelis	34	EU	2013	75	3	2015	£4M	
29	GK	(England)	Richard Wright	37	EU	2012	0	0	2015	Free	
33	CB	(Serbia)	Matija Nastasić	22	Non-EU	2012	51	0	2017	£10M	On loan at Schalke 04
35	FW	(Montenegro)	Stevan Jovetić	25	Non-EU	2013	43	11	2018	£22M	
36	CM	(Argentina)	Bruno Zuculini	22	EU	2014	1	0	N/A	£1.5M	On loan at Córdoba
38	CB	(Belgium)	Dedryck Boyata	24	EU	2006	36	1	2016	YS	
42	CM	(Ivory Coast)	Yaya Touré	32	Non-EU	2010	221	67	2017	£24M	
60	FW	(Sweden)	John Guidetti	23	EU	2008	1	0	2015	£100,000	On loan at Celtic
64	AM	(Portugal)	Marcos Lopes	19	EU	2011	5	1	2016	£790,000	On loan at Lille
78	FW	(Spain)	José Ángel Pozo	19	EU	2012	4	1	2017	£2.4M	

Updated to match played 26 June 2015
Source: mcfc.co.uk
Ordered by squad number. Appearances include all competitive league and cup appearances, including as substitute.

=== Playing statistics ===
As of 25 May 2015

Appearances (Apps.) numbers are for appearances in competitive games only including sub appearances
Red card numbers denote: Numbers in parentheses represent red cards overturned for wrongful dismissal.

No.	Nat.	Player	Pos.	Premier League				FA Cup				League Cup				Champions League				Community Shield				Total			
No.	Nat.	Player	Pos.	Apps	Goal	Yellow card	Red card	Apps	Goal	Yellow card	Red card	Apps	Goal	Yellow card	Red card	Apps	Goal	Yellow card	Red card	Apps	Goal	Yellow card	Red card	Apps	Goal	Yellow card	Red card
1	(England)	Joe Hart	GK	36		1										8								42		1	
2	(England)	Micah Richards	DF																	1				1			
3	(France)	Bacary Sagna	DF	9		1		1				2				4								16		1	
4	(Belgium)	Vincent Kompany	DF	25		6		1		1						7		1						33		8	
5	(Argentina)	Pablo Zabaleta	DF	29	1	7	1	1								6	1	2						36	2	9	1
6	(Brazil)	Fernando	MF	25	2	7		2								5		2		1		1		33	2	10	
7	(England)	James Milner	MF	32	5	6		2	2			2		1		8	1			1				45	8	7	
8	(France)	Samir Nasri	MF	24	2	5		1				1				6	1	2		1				33	3	7	
10	(Bosnia and Herzegovina)	Edin Džeko	FW	22	4	1		1				2	2			6		2		1				32	6	3	
11	(Serbia)	Aleksandar Kolarov	DF	21	2	4		2				2				4		1		1				30	2	5	
12	(England)	Scott Sinclair	MF	2								1								1				4			
13	(Argentina)	Willy Caballero	GK	2				2				2								1				7			
14	(Ivory Coast)	Wilfried Bony	FW	10	2	1										2								12	2	1	
15	(Spain)	Jesús Navas	MF	35		3		2				2	1			7				1				47	1	3	
16	(Argentina)	Sergio Agüero	FW	33	26	3		1				1		1		7	6	2						42	32	6	
18	(England)	Frank Lampard	MF	32	6	1		2				1	2			3								38	8	1	
20	(France)	Eliaquim Mangala	DF	25		4	1	1				2		2		3								32		6	1
21	(Spain)	David Silva	MF	32	12	8		2				1				6		1		1				42	12	9	
22	(France)	Gaël Clichy	DF	23	1	1		1								6		3	1	1				31	1	4	1
25	(Brazil)	Fernandinho	MF	33	3	6		1		1		2				7		2	1					43	3	9	1
26	(Argentina)	Martín Demichelis	DF	31	1	6						2				7		2						40	1	8	
29	(England)	Richard Wright	GK																								
33	(Serbia)	Matija Nastasić	DF																	1				1			
35	(Montenegro)	Stevan Jovetić	FW	17	5			2				1				5				1				26	5		
36	(Argentina)	Bruno Zuculini	MF																	1				1			
38	(Belgium)	Dedryck Boyata	DF	2		1		2				1								1				6		1	
42	(Ivory Coast)	Yaya Touré	MF	29	10	5		1				2	1			5	1	1	1	1				38	12	6	1
78	(Spain)	José Ángel Pozo	FW	3								1	1											4	1		
Own goals					1				0				0				0				0				1		
Totals					83	77	2		2	2	0		7	4	0		10	22	3		0	1	0		102	106	5

Source: (for players and positions) Season 2014–15 First Team Squad (for squad numbers) Squad Profiles (for actual stats.)

=== Goalscorers ===
Includes all competitive matches. The list is sorted alphabetically by surname when total goals are equal.

Correct as of match played on 25 May 2015

No.	Nat.	Player	Pos.	Premier League	FA Cup	League Cup	Champions League	Community Shield	TOTAL
16	(Argentina)	Sergio Agüero	FW	26	0	0	6	0	32
21	(Spain)	David Silva	MF	12	0	0	0	0	12
42	(Ivory Coast)	Yaya Touré	MF	10	0	1	1	0	12
7	(England)	James Milner	MF	5	2	0	1	0	8
18	(England)	Frank Lampard	MF	6	0	2	0	0	8
10	(Bosnia and Herzegovina)	Edin Džeko	FW	4	0	2	0	0	6
35	(Montenegro)	Stevan Jovetić	FW	5	0	0	0	0	5
25	(Brazil)	Fernandinho	MF	3	0	0	0	0	3
8	(France)	Samir Nasri	MF	2	0	0	1	0	3
14	(Ivory Coast)	Wilfried Bony	FW	2	0	0	0	0	2
6	(Brazil)	Fernando	MF	2	0	0	0	0	2
11	(Serbia)	Aleksandar Kolarov	DF	2	0	0	0	0	2
5	(Argentina)	Pablo Zabaleta	DF	1	0	0	1	0	2
22	(France)	Gaël Clichy	DF	1	0	0	0	0	1
26	(Argentina)	Martín Demichelis	DF	1	0	0	0	0	1
15	(Spain)	Jesús Navas	MF	0	0	1	0	0	1
78	(Spain)	José Ángel Pozo	FW	0	0	1	0	0	1
Own Goals				1	0	0	0	0	1
Totals				83	2	7	10	0	102

== Awards ==
=== Premier League Golden Boot award ===
Awarded to the player who has scored the most league goals at the end of each Premier League season

Year	Player	Goals
2014–15	(Argentina) Sergio Agüero	26

=== Premier League Golden Glove award ===
Awarded to the player who has kept the most league clean sheets at the end of each Premier League season

Year	Player	Clean sheets
2014–15	(England) Joe Hart	14

=== Football Supporters' Federation Player of the Year award ===
Awarded annually to the player chosen by a public vote on the Football Supporters' Federation website

Year	Player
2014	(Argentina) Sergio Agüero

=== CAF African Player of the Year award ===
Awarded every calendar year from a shortlist of three based on a vote of the 56 CAF national team managers

Year	Player
2014	(Ivory Coast) Yaya Touré

=== Premier League Manager of the Month award ===
Awarded monthly to the manager who was chosen by a panel assembled by the Premier League's sponsor

Month	Manager
December	(Chile) Manuel Pellegrini

=== Premier League Player of the Month award ===
Awarded monthly to the player chosen by a panel assembled by the Premier League's sponsor

Month	Player
November	(Argentina) Sergio Agüero

=== Etihad Player of the Month awards ===
Awarded to the player that receives the most votes in a poll conducted each month on the MCFC OWS

Month	Player
August	(Montenegro) Stevan Jovetić
September	(England) Frank Lampard
October	(Argentina) Sergio Agüero
November	(Argentina) Sergio Agüero
December	(Spain) David Silva
January	(England) James Milner
February	(Spain) David Silva
March	(England) Joe Hart
April	(Argentina) Sergio Agüero

=== Associated Press International Team of the Week award ===
Awarded on a weekly basis to the team elected by vote of accredited Associated Press journalists as having made the best performance(s) of any global club

Week ending	For performance in
30 November 2014	Manchester City 3 – 2 Bayern Munich; Southampton 0 – 3 Manchester City

=== Associated Press International Player of the Week award ===
Awarded on a weekly basis to the player elected by vote of accredited Associated Press journalists as having made the best performance(s) of any global player

Week ending	Player	For performance in
30 November 2014	(Argentina) Sergio Agüero	Manchester City 3 – 2 Bayern Munich; Southampton 0 – 3 Manchester City

== Transfers and loans ==
=== Transfers in ===
First Team
Date	Position	No.	Player	From club	Transfer fee
13 June 2014	DF	3	(France) Bacary Sagna	(England) Arsenal	Free
26 June 2014	MF	6	(Brazil) Fernando	(Portugal) Porto	£12,000,000
8 July 2014	GK	13	(Argentina) Willy Caballero	(Spain) Málaga	£4,400,000
8 August 2014	MF	36	(Argentina) Bruno Zuculini	(Argentina) Racing Club	£1,500,000
11 August 2014	DF	20	(France) Eliaquim Mangala	(Portugal) Porto	£41,900,000
13 August 2014	MF	18	(England) Frank Lampard	(England) Chelsea	Free
14 January 2015	FW	14	(Ivory Coast) Wilfried Bony	(Wales) Swansea City	£25,000,000

Reserves and Academy
Date	Position	No.	Player	From club	Transfer fee
1 July 2014	MF		(Netherlands) Javairô Dilrosun	(Netherlands) Ajax	Free
1 July 2014	MF		(Netherlands) Rodney Kongolo	(Netherlands) Feyenoord	Free
1 July 2014	GK		(Norway) Kjetil Haug	(Norway) Sarpsborg 08	Free

=== Transfers out ===
Premier League clubs have submitted their retained and released players lists for 2013–14 indicating which players will be released on 1 June 2014.

First Team
Exit date	Position	No.	Player	To club	Transfer fee
1 June 2014	DF	6	(England) Joleon Lescott	(England) West Bromwich Albion	Free
1 June 2014	MF	18	(England) Gareth Barry	(England) Everton	£2,000,000
1 June 2014	GK	30	(Romania) Costel Pantilimon	(England) Sunderland	Free
5 August 2014	MF	17	(England) Jack Rodwell	(England) Sunderland	£10,000,000
14 August 2014	MF	14	(Spain) Javi García	(Russia) Zenit Saint Petersburg	£13,000,000
1 September 2014	MF	52	(Wales) Emyr Huws	(England) Wigan Athletic	Undisc.

Reserves and Academy
Exit date	Position	No.	Player	To club	Transfer fee
1 June 2014	MF		(Ghana) Thomas Agyiri	(Portugal) Atlético CP	Released
1 June 2014	MF		(England) Alex Henshall	(England) Ipswich Town	Released
1 June 2014	DF		(England) Kieran Kennedy	(England) Leicester City	Released
1 June 2014	DF		(England) George Swan	(England) Wolverhampton Wanderers	Released
1 June 2014	FW		(England) Alex Nimely	(England) Port Vale	Released
1 January 2015	MF		(Slovakia) Albert Rusnák	(Netherlands) Groningen	Undisc.
31 March 2015	GK		(Norway) Eirik Johansen	(United States) New York City FC	Undisc.

=== Loans out ===
First Team
Start date	End date	Position	No.	Player	To club
26 June 2014	30 June 2015	MF	64	(Portugal) Marcos Lopes	(France) Lille
22 July 2014	1 September 2014	MF	52	(Wales) Emyr Huws	(England) Wigan Athletic
14 August 2014	30 June 2015	DF	19	(Netherlands) Karim Rekik	(Netherlands) PSV
19 August 2014	30 January 2015	MF	36	(Argentina) Bruno Zuculini	(Spain) Valencia
1 September 2014	30 June 2015	DF	2	(England) Micah Richards	(Italy) Fiorentina
1 September 2014	30 June 2015	FW	9	(Spain) Álvaro Negredo	(Spain) Valencia
4 September 2014	30 June 2015	FW	60	(Sweden) John Guidetti	(Scotland) Celtic
12 January 2015	30 June 2015	DF	33	(Serbia) Matija Nastasić	(Germany) Schalke 04
30 January 2015	30 June 2015	MF	12	(England) Scott Sinclair	(England) Aston Villa
30 January 2015	30 June 2015	MF	36	(Argentina) Bruno Zuculini	(Spain) Córdoba

Reserves and Academy
Start date	End date	Position	No.	Player	To club
2 July 2014	30 June 2015	DF	—	(England) Ellis Plummer	(Scotland) St Mirren
25 July 2014	1 January 2015	MF	55	(Slovakia) Albert Rusnák	(Netherlands) Cambuur
1 August 2014	30 June 2015	GK	—	(Wales) Billy O'Brien	(England) Hyde
12 August 2014	30 June 2015	DF	71	(Belgium) Jason Denayer	(Scotland) Celtic
12 August 2014	30 June 2015	DF	68	(England) Greg Leigh	(England) Crewe Alexandra
19 August 2014	5 January 2015	FW	—	(England) Devante Cole	(England) Barnsley
19 August 2014	30 June 2015	MF	51	(England) Adam Drury	(Scotland) St Mirren
2 October 2014	25 November 2014	FW	76	(England) Jordy Hiwula	(England) Yeovil Town
27 November 2014	30 June 2015	MF	66	(France) Seko Fofana	(England) Fulham
12 January 2015	30 June 2015	MF	75	(Austria) Sinan Bytyqi	(Netherlands) Cambuur
22 January 2015	30 June 2015	FW	—	(England) Devante Cole	(England) Milton Keynes Dons
30 January 2015	30 June 2015	MF	70	(England) George Evans	(England) Scunthorpe United
31 January 2015	30 June 2017	DF	—	(Nigeria) Chidiebere Nwakali	(Spain) Atlético Malagueño
2 February 2015	4 April 2015	FW	76	(England) Jordy Hiwula	(England) Walsall
