= 2025–26 West Ham United F.C. season =

English football team season

West Ham United
2025–26 season
- Owners: David Sullivan (38.8%); Daniel Křetínský (27%); Vanessa Gold (25.1%); J. Albert "Tripp" Smith (8%); Other investors (1.1%)
- Co-chairman: David Sullivan and Vanessa Gold
- Manager: Graham Potter (until 27 September); Nuno Espírito Santo (from 27 September)
- Stadium: London Stadium
- Premier League: 18th (relegated)
- FA Cup: Quarter-finals
- EFL Cup: Second round
- Top goalscorer: League: Jarrod Bowen (9); All: Jarrod Bowen (11)
- Highest home attendance: 62,473 (v. Manchester United, 10 February 2026, Premier League)
- Lowest home attendance: 48,570 (v. Brentford, 9 March 2026, FA Cup)
- Average home league attendance: 62,347
- Biggest win: 4–0 (v. Wolverhampton Wanderers, 10 April 2026, Premier League)
- Biggest defeat: 1–5 (v. Chelsea, 22 August 2025, Premier League)
Home colours	Away colours	Third colours

The 2025–26 season was the 131st season in the history of West Ham United Football Club, and the club's fourteenth consecutive season in the Premier League. In addition to the domestic league, the club also participated in the FA Cup and EFL Cup.

After finishing 18th in the Premier League, the club was relegated to the EFL Championship for the first time since the 2010–11 season.

== Season summary ==
=== Start of season ===
==== August ====
West Ham started their season on 16 August at the Stadium of Light playing newly promoted Sunderland. After a goalless first-half, Sunderland's Eliezer Mayenda opened the scoring on 61 minutes with a header past West Ham's debut goalkeeper, Mads Hermansen. Dan Ballard added a second on 73 minutes and Wilson Isidor made it 3–0, the final score in the second minute of added-time.

Chelsea were the visitors for West Ham's opening game at the London Stadium on 22 August. Although Lucas Paquetá opened the scoring on 6 minutes, Chelsea replied with goals from João Pedro on 15 minutes, Pedro Neto on 23 minutes, Enzo Fernández on 34 minutes, Moisés Caicedo on 54 minutes and Trevoh Chalobah on 58 minutes to make the final score 5–1. With eight goals conceded, this was this most conceded by the club in their first two games in any season in the top–flight of English football.

On 26 August, West Ham travelled to Molineux to play Wolves in the second round of the EFL Cup. In the first–half, Guido Rodriguez fouled Jean-Ricner Bellegarde to give away a penalty. Hwang Hee-chan hit the post with his penalty but Gomes followed–up the rebound to make it 1–0 in the 43 minute. In the 50th minute, Tomáš Souček equalised with a header and Lucas Paquetá scored another header in the 63rd minute to put the visitors ahead. Wolves manager Vítor Pereira made several substitutions, including Jørgen Strand Larsen who scored in the 82nd and 84th minute to put the hosts 3–2 up. This was the final score and West Ham were eliminated from the competition at their first attempt. Following the game, club captain Jarrod Bowen had to be held back by stewards after trying to confront a group of West Ham supporters after something seemed to be said from the stands.

West Ham travelled to the City Ground on 31 August to play Nottingham Forest in the Premier League. With the game still goalless, on 82 minutes West Ham brought on Crysencio Summerville for his first game since January 2025. In the 84th minute he assisted Jarrod Bowen for West Ham's first goal and was fouled in the penalty area resulting in Lucas Paquetá scoring the penalty-kick in the 88th minute to make it 2–0. Callum Wilson added a third, his first for the club, in the first minute of added–time. The game finished 3–0 to the visitors.

==== September ====
On 13 September, Tottenham Hotspur were the visitors to the London Stadium in the Premier League. After a goalless first-half, Pape Matar Sarr scored in the 47th minute for Tottenham. Tomáš Souček was sent-off in the 54th minute receiving a straight red card for a bad lunging foul on João Palhinha. Lucas Bergvall added a second in the 57th minute and Micky van de Ven a third in the 64th minute. The game finished 3–0 as West Ham dropped into bottom three of the league table.

West Ham were at home again on 20 September, in the Premier League, to Crystal Palace. Before the game thousands of supporters protested against the running of the club by David Sullivan and Karren Brady. Palace went ahead in the game in the 37th minute with a goal by Jean-Philippe Mateta. Jarrod Bowen equalised in the 49th minute only for Tyrick Mitchell to score in the 68th minute to make it 2–1 to Crystal Palace, the final score.

On 27 September, after a dismal start to the season, manager Graham Potter was sacked. On the same day, Nuno Espírito Santo was appointed as head coach on a three-year contract. Nuno's first game in charge was on 29 September in an away game in the Premier League to Everton. The home team took the lead in the 18th minute with a headed goal from Michael Keane. West Ham equalised in the 65th minute through Jarrod Bowen, the first goal scored by an away team at Everton's new, Hill Dickinson Stadium. The game finished 1–1.

==== October ====
On 4 October, West Ham were away at the Emirates Stadium to Arsenal in the Premier League. Declan Rice scored in the 38th minute and Bukayo Saka scored from the penalty spot after El Hadji Malick Diouf had fouled Jurrien Timber. The game finished 2–0.

The London Stadium hosted Brentford in the Premier League on 20 October. Some supporters staged a boycott of the game in a protest concerning the running of the club by David Sullivan and Karren Brady. There were thousands of empty seats at the stadium as the match began. Brentford opened the scoring in the 43rd minute through Igor Thiago. They added a second in the 4th minute of added-time in the second half through Mathias Jensen. The game ended 2–0 with West Ham losing their first four home games of the season for the first time in their history. They had one shot on target and were booed from the pitch in a performance described as "dire".

On 24 October, West Ham travelled to Elland Road to play Leeds United in the Premier League. They were behind after only three minutes when Brenden Aaronson scored for Leeds. The hosts added a second on 15 minutes through Joe Rodon. The score remained at 2–0 until the 90th minute when Mateus Fernandes scored with a header for West Ham. There were no further goals as West Ham made their worst start to a top-flight season since the 1973–74 season.

==== November ====
On 2 November, West Ham were at home to Newcastle United in the Premier League. Jacob Murphy put the visitors 1–0 up after only 4 minutes with a shot from outside the box. However, Lucas Paquetá equalised on 35 minutes, also from outside the box. In the fifth minute of added time in the first-half, Sven Botman turned Aaron Wan-Bissaka's cross into his own net to make it 2–1 to West Ham at half time. Tomáš Souček decided the game in the seventh minute of added time in the second-half tapping the ball into the net after Newcastle goalkeeper, Nick Pope had failed to hold Jarrod Bowen's shot. West Ham moved onto seven points, rising one place to 18th.

Burnley were the visitors to the London Stadium on 8 November for a Premier League game. Zian Flemming put them 1–0 up on 35 minutes only for Callum Wilson to score on 44 minutes to make it 1–1, the score at half-time. Tomáš Souček scored on 77 minutes and Kyle Walker-Peters added a third goal, his first for the club, on 87 minutes. Josh Cullen scored for Burnley in the seventh minute of added time but the game finished immediately after the restart at 3–2.

On 22 November, West Ham travelled to the Vitality Stadium to play AFC Bournemouth in the Premier League. Callum Wilson put the visitors 2–0 up at half-time with goals in the 11th and 35th minutes. However Bournemouth drew level after a penalty by Marcus Tavernier in the 69th minute following a handball by Max Kilman and an 81st-minute goal by Enes Ünal. West Ham goalkeeper, Alphonse Areola made a number to saves in the second half to prevent a Bournemouth winner and the game finished 2–2.

== Transfers and contracts ==
=== In ===
Date	Pos.	Player	From	Fee	Ref.
1 July 2025 (Note: The transfer was announced on 6 June, and would become official on 1 July as per the terms of the loan agreement)	CB	(France) Jean-Clair Todibo	(France) Nice	£32,800,000	
1 July 2025	CF	(Scotland) Daniel Cummings (Note: Signed initially for the under-21's)	(Scotland) Celtic	Free	
15 July 2025	LWB	(Senegal) El Hadji Malick Diouf	(Czech Republic) Slavia Prague	£19,000,000	
20 July 2025	RB	(England) Kyle Walker-Peters	(England) Southampton	Free	
2 August 2025	CF	(England) Callum Wilson	(England) Newcastle United	Free	
9 August 2025	GK	(Denmark) Mads Hermansen	(England) Leicester City	£20,000,000	
29 August 2025	CM	(Portugal) Mateus Fernandes	(England) Southampton	£38,000,000	
29 August 2025	DM	(France) Soungoutou Magassa	(France) Monaco	£17,300,000	
1 September 2025	CB	(France) Dimitri Colau	(France) Paris	Undisclosed	
26 September 2025	GK	(Republic of Ireland) Reece Byrne	(England) Newcastle United	Free	
26 September 2025	GK	(England) Tom Wooster	(England) Manchester United	Free	
2 January 2026	CF	(Brazil) Pablo	(Portugal) Gil Vicente	£21,800,000	
5 January 2026	CF	(Argentina) Taty Castellanos	(Italy) Lazio	£25,200,000	
28 January 2026	RW	(Spain) Adama Traoré	(England) Fulham	£1,000,000 (Note: Rising to £2,000,000 with add-ons)	

Expenditure: ~ ▼£175,100,000

=== Out ===
Date	Pos.	Player	To	Fee	Ref.
10 July 2025	RW	(Ghana) Mohammed Kudus	(England) Tottenham Hotspur	£55,000,000	
27 July 2025	RW	(Republic of Ireland) Sean Moore	(Republic of Ireland) Shelbourne	Undisclosed	
28 July 2025	CDM	(Northern Ireland) Patrick Kelly	(England) Barnsley	Free transfer	
1 September 2025	LB	(Italy) Emerson Palmieri	(France) Marseille	£605,000	
2 September 2025	CB	(Morocco) Nayef Aguerd	(France) Marseille	£19,925,000	
9 September 2025	GK	(England) Wes Foderingham	(Cyprus) Aris Limassol	Undisclosed	
4 January 2026	RW	(Brazil) Luis Guilherme	(Portugal) Sporting CP	£17,400,000	
18 January 2026	CM	(Scotland) Andy Irving	(Czech Republic) Sparta Prague	Undisclosed	
26 January 2026	CDM	(Argentina) Guido Rodríguez	(Spain) Valencia	Undisclosed	
30 January 2026	RW	(England) Elisha Sowunmi	(England) Tottenham Hotspur	Undisclosed	
30 January 2026	CAM	(Brazil) Lucas Paquetá	(Brazil) Flamengo	£35,750,000	
2 February 2026	LWB	(England) Emeka Adiele	(Netherlands) Utrecht	Undisclosed	
6 February 2026	RW	(England) Gideon Kodua	(England) Luton Town	£1,000,000	

Income: ▲ ~ £128,870,000 (All fees converted into GBP)

=== Loaned in ===
Date	Pos.	Player	From	Date until	Ref.
1 September 2025	CB	(Brazil) Igor Julio	(England) Brighton & Hove Albion	27 January 2026 (Note: On 27 January, Julio's initial season-long loan from Brighton & Hove Albion was terminated)	
22 January 2026	LW	(Venezuela) Keiber Lamadrid	(Venezuela) Deportivo La Guaira	31 May 2026	
2 February 2026	CB	(France) Axel Disasi	(England) Chelsea	31 May 2026	

=== Loaned out ===
Date	Pos.	Player	To	Date until	Ref.
22 July 2025	RW	(England) Gideon Kodua	(England) Luton Town	6 February 2026 (Note: On 6 February, Luton Town exercised their option to sign Kodua permanently)	
25 July 2025	CB	(Northern Ireland) Michael Forbes	(England) Northampton Town	31 May 2026	
4 August 2025	GK	(England) Mason Terry	(England) Braintree Town	31 May 2026	
6 August 2025	CB	(England) Kaelan Casey	(Wales) Swansea City	16 January 2026 (Note: On 16 January, Casey was recalled from his season-long loan at Swansea City and subsequently joined Leyton Orient on loan)	
23 August 2025	CDM	(Mexico) Edson Álvarez	(Turkey) Fenerbahçe	31 May 2026	
1 September 2025	RW	(Ivory Coast) Maxwel Cornet	(Italy) Genoa	31 May 2026	
1 September 2025	GK	(England) Finlay Herrick	(England) Boreham Wood	29 October 2025 (Note: On 29 October, Herrick was recalled from his loan at Boreham Wood)	
1 September 2025	CM	(England) Lewis Orford	(England) Stevenage	26 November 2025 (Note: On 26 November, Orford was recalled from his loan at Stevenage)	
1 September 2025	RB	(England) Junior Robinson	(Scotland) Livingston	9 January 2026 (Note: On 9 January, Robinson was recalled from his season-long loan at Livingston and subsequently joined Boreham Wood on loan)	
18 September 2025	LB	(England) Regan Clayton	(England) Braintree Town	9 November 2025	
1 January 2026	GK	(Hungary) Krisztián Hegyi	(Hungary) MTK Budapest	31 May 2026	
2 January 2026	CF	(Germany) Niclas Füllkrug	(Italy) Milan	31 May 2026	
7 January 2026	CF	(Northern Ireland) Callum Marshall	(Germany) VfL Bochum	31 May 2026	
9 January 2026	CAM	(England) George Earthy	(England) Bristol City	31 May 2026	
9 January 2026	RB	(England) Junior Robinson	(England) Boreham Wood	31 May 2026	
16 January 2026	CB	(England) Kaelan Casey	(England) Leyton Orient	31 May 2026	
28 January 2026	CM	(England) James Ward-Prowse	(England) Burnley	31 May 2026	
21 March 2026	RB	(England) Ryan Battrum	(England) Braintree Town	31 May 2026	
26 March 2026	CF	(Scotland) Josh Landers	(England) Boreham Wood	31 May 2026	

=== Released ===
Date	Pos.	Player	Subsequent club	Join date	Ref.
30 June 2025	AM	(England) Kamarai Swyer	(England) Northampton Town	1 July 2025	
30 June 2025	LB	(England) Aaron Cresswell	(England) Stoke City	10 July 2025	
30 June 2025	CF	(England) Brad Dolaghan	(England) Worthing	12 July 2025	
30 June 2025	RB	(Czech Republic) Vladimír Coufal	(Germany) TSG Hoffenheim	5 August 2025	
30 June 2025	CF	(England) Danny Ings	(England) Sheffield United	27 August 2025	
30 June 2025	CB	(France) Kurt Zouma	(Romania) CFR Cluj	3 September 2025	
30 June 2025	CF	(Jamaica) Michail Antonio	(Qatar) Al-Sailiya	2 March 2026	
20 August 2025	CB	(Brazil) Luizão	(Brazil) Criciúma	19 September 2025	

=== New contract ===
Date	Pos.	Player	Contracted until	Ref.
2 June 2025	RW	(England) Elisha Sowunmi	Undisclosed (Note: First professional contract)	
2 July 2025	RW	(England) Andre Dike	Undisclosed	
25 August 2025	RB	(Northern Ireland) Callum Leacock	Undisclosed	
10 September 2025	GK	(Poland) Łukasz Fabiański	30 June 2026	
21 October 2025	CB	(England) Ezra Mayers	30 June 2028 (Note: Option to extend for a further year)	
27 October 2025	CDM	(France) Mohamadou Kanté	30 June 2031	
29 October 2025	CF	(Scotland) Josh Landers	30 June 2028	
31 October 2025	CM	(England) Preston Fearon	30 June 2028	
4 November 2025	CB	(England) Airidas Golambeckis	30 June 2029	
6 February 2026	CB	(Greece) Rayan Oyebade	30 June 2028	
6 March 2026	CF	(England) Joshua Ajala	30 June 2028	
24 March 2026	LW	(Northern Ireland) Joel Kerr	Undisclosed	
8 May 2026	CAM	(England) Lewis Beckford	Undisclosed	
18 May 2026	LW	(England) Majid Balogun	Undisclosed	

== Pre-season and friendlies ==
On 17 June, West Ham announced a home pre-season friendly against Lille. A pre-season training camp in Switzerland and a fixture against Grasshopper was next to be confirmed.

Win Draw Loss Fixtures

19 July 2025 Friendly	Grasshopper	1–3	West Ham United	Niederhasli, Switzerland
15:00 CEST	Asp Jensen 66'	Report	Irving 13'; Marshall 47'; Paquetá 87' (pen.)	Stadium: GC/Campus

26 July 2025 PL Summer Series	Manchester United	2–1	West Ham United	East Rutherford, United States
19:00 EDT	Fernandes 5' (pen.), 52'; Yoro (yellow card) 32'	Report	Bowen 63'	Stadium: MetLife Stadium; Attendance: 82,566; Referee: Thomas Bramall (England)

30 July 2025 PL Summer Series	West Ham United	2–1	Everton	Chicago, United States
17:30 CDT	Paquetá 41'; Potts (yellow card) 43'; Füllkrug 64'	Report	Keane (yellow card) 12'; Gueye 17'; Garner (yellow card) 90+4'	Stadium: Soldier Field; Attendance: 58,927; Referee: Rosendo Mendoza (United States)

3 August 2025 PL Summer Series	Bournemouth	0–2	West Ham United	Atlanta, United States
14:00 EDT	Araujo (yellow card) 77'	Report	Füllkrug 24'; Potts (yellow card) 57'; Bowen 67'; Mavropanos (yellow card) 87'	Stadium: Mercedes-Benz Stadium; Referee: Victor Rivas (United States)

9 August 2025 BOYLE Sports Cup	West Ham United	1–1 (5–4 p)	Lille	Stratford
15:00 BST	Füllkrug 87'	Report	Giroud 45+1'	Stadium: London Stadium; Attendance: 23,104; Referee: Darren England (England)
	Penalties
	Füllkrug (penalty missed); Bowen (penalty scored); Ward-Prowse (penalty scored); Souček (penalty scored); Aguerd (penalty scored); Kilman (penalty scored)		(penalty scored) Haraldsson; (penalty scored) Mukau; (penalty scored) Alexsandro; (penalty scored) Diaoune; (penalty missed) Ngoy; (penalty missed) Baret

== Competitions ==
=== Overall record ===
Competition	First match	Last match	Starting round	Final position	Record							
Competition	First match	Last match	Starting round	Final position	Pld	W	D	L	GF	GA	GD	Win %
Premier League	16 August 2025	24 May 2026	Matchday 1	18th	38	10	9	19	46	65	−19	26.32
FA Cup	11 January 2026	5 April 2026	Third round	Quarter-finals	4	2	2	0	7	5	+2	50.00
EFL Cup	26 August 2025		Second round	Second round	1	0	0	1	2	3	−1	0.00
Total					43	12	11	20	55	73	−18	27.91

Source: Soccerway

=== Premier League ===
==== League table ====
Pos	Team	Pld	W	D	L	GF	GA	GD	Pts	Qualification or relegation
16	Nottingham Forest	38	11	11	16	48	51	−3	44	
17	Tottenham Hotspur	38	10	11	17	48	57	−9	41	
18	West Ham United (R)	38	10	9	19	46	65	−19	39	Relegation to EFL Championship
19	Burnley (R)	38	4	10	24	38	75	−37	22	Relegation to EFL Championship
20	Wolverhampton Wanderers (R)	38	3	11	24	27	68	−41	20	Relegation to EFL Championship

Source: Premier League
Rules for classification: 1) Points; 2) Goal difference; 3) Goals scored; 4) If the champions, relegated teams or qualified teams for UEFA competitions cannot be determined by rules 1 to 3, rules 4.1 to 4.3 are applied – 4.1) Points gained in head-to-head record between such teams; 4.2) Away goals scored in head-to-head record between such teams; 4.3) Play-offs
(R) Relegated

==== Results summary ====
Overall								Home						Away					
Pld	W	D	L	GF	GA	GD	Pts	W	D	L	GF	GA	GD	W	D	L	GF	GA	GD
38	10	9	19	46	65	−19	39	6	4	9	27	30	−3	4	5	10	19	35	−16

Source: Soccerway

==== Results by round ====
Round	1	2	3	4	5	6	7	8	9	10	11	12	13	14	15	16	17	18	19	20	21	22	23	24	25	26	27	28	29	30	31	32	33	34	35	36	37	38
Ground	A	H	A	H	H	A	A	H	A	H	H	A	H	A	A	H	A	H	H	A	H	A	H	A	A	H	H	A	A	H	A	H	A	H	A	H	A	H
Result	L	L	W	L	L	D	L	L	L	W	W	D	L	D	D	L	L	L	D	L	L	W	W	L	W	D	D	L	W	D	L	W	D	W	L	L	L	W
Position	19	20	16	18	19	19	19	19	19	18	18	17	17	18	18	18	18	18	18	18	18	18	18	18	18	18	18	18	18	18	18	17	17	17	18	18	18	18

Source: Soccerway
A = Away; H = Home; W = Win; D = Draw; L = Loss

==== Matches ====
On 18 June, the Premier League fixtures were revealed, with West Ham away to Sunderland on the opening weekend.

Win Draw Loss Fixtures

16 August 2025 1	Sunderland	3–0	West Ham United	Sunderland
15:00 BST	Mayenda 61'; Ballard 73'; Isidor 90+2'	Report	Kilman (yellow card) 70'	Stadium: Stadium of Light; Attendance: 46,233; Referee: Robert Jones

22 August 2025 2	West Ham United	1–5	Chelsea	Stratford
20:00 BST	Paquetá 6'	Report	João Pedro 15'; Neto 23'; Fernández 34'; Caicedo 54'; Chalobah 58'; Hato (yellow card) 87'	Stadium: London Stadium; Attendance: 62,462; Referee: Michael Oliver
Note: Fixture was originally scheduled for 23 August, but was moved live Sky Sports broadcasting.

31 August 2025 3	Nottingham Forest	0–3	West Ham United	West Bridgford
14:00 BST		Report	Bowen 84'; Paquetá 88' (pen.); Wilson 90+1'	Stadium: City Ground; Attendance: 30,215; Referee: Craig Pawson
Note: Fixture was originally scheduled for 30 August, but was moved live Sky Sports broadcasting.

13 September 2025 4	West Ham United	0–3	Tottenham Hotspur	Stratford
17:30 BST	Souček (red card) 54'	Report	Sarr 47'; Spence (yellow card) 52'; Bergvall 57'; Van de Ven 64'	Stadium: London Stadium; Attendance: 62,459; Referee: Jarred Gillett
Note: Fixture was originally scheduled for a 15:00 kick-off, but was moved live Sky Sports broadcasting.

20 September 2025 5	West Ham United	1–2	Crystal Palace	Stratford
15:00 BST	Kilman (yellow card) 45+1'; Bowen 49'; Paquetá (yellow card) 74'; Diouf (yellow card) 82'	Report	Mateta 37'; Mitchell (yellow card) 40', (goal) 68'; Lerma (yellow card) 90+1'; Henderson (yellow card) 90+3'	Stadium: London Stadium; Attendance: 62,455; Referee: Tony Harrington

29 September 2025 6	Everton	1–1	West Ham United	Liverpool
20:00 BST	Keane 18'; Tarkowski (yellow card) 24'; Mykolenko (yellow card) 87'; Dewsbury-Hall (yellow card) 90'	Report	Walker-Peters (yellow card) 33'; Magassa (yellow card) 48'; Kilman (yellow card) 64'; Bowen 65'; Mavropanos (yellow card) 82'	Stadium: Hill Dickinson Stadium; Attendance: 51,890; Referee: Sam Barrott
Note: Fixture was originally scheduled for 27 September, but was moved for live Sky Sports broadcasting.

4 October 2025 7	Arsenal	2–0	West Ham United	Holloway
15:00 BST	Rice 38'; Saka 67' (pen.)	Report	Summerville (yellow card) 58'; Paquetá (yellow card) 69'	Stadium: Emirates Stadium; Attendance: 60,181; Referee: John Brooks

20 October 2025 8	West Ham United	0–2	Brentford	Stratford
20:00 BST	Summerville (yellow card) 67'	Report	Thiago 43'; Henderson (yellow card) 89'; Jensen 90+4'	Stadium: London Stadium; Attendance: 62,452; Referee: Andrew Madley
Note: Fixture was initially scheduled for 18 October, but was rescheduled for live Sky Sports broadcasting.

24 October 2025 9	Leeds United	2–1	West Ham United	Leeds
20:00 BST	Aaronson 3'; Rodon 15'; Gruev (yellow card) 76'; Perri (yellow card) 84'; Justin (yellow card) 90+3'	Report	Summerville (yellow card) 40'; Paquetá (yellow card) 55'; Fernandes 90'; Todibo (yellow card) 90+2'	Stadium: Elland Road; Attendance: 36,788; Referee: Stuart Attwell
Note: Fixture was initially scheduled for 25 October, but was rescheduled for live Sky Sports broadcasting.

2 November 2025 10	West Ham United	3–1	Newcastle United	Stratford
14:00 GMT	Paquetá 35', (yellow card) 90+6'; Botman 45+5' (o.g.); Souček 90+7'	Report	J. Murphy 4'; Bruno Guimarães (yellow card) 30'; Ramsey (yellow card) 90+6'	Stadium: London Stadium; Attendance: 62,441; Referee: Robert Jones
Note: Fixture was initially scheduled for 1 November, but was rescheduled for live Sky Sports broadcasting.

8 November 2025 11	West Ham United	3–2	Burnley	Stratford
15:00 GMT	Paquetá (yellow card) 25'; Wilson 44'; Souček 77'; Walker-Peters 87'; Fernandes (yellow card) 90+6'	Report	Flemming 35', (yellow card) 55'; Walker (yellow card) 86'; Cullen 90+7'	Stadium: London Stadium; Attendance: 62,449; Referee: Michael Salisbury

22 November 2025 12	Bournemouth	2–2	West Ham United	Bournemouth
15:00 GMT	Brooks (yellow card) 34'; Tavernier 69' (pen.); Ünal 81'; Truffert (yellow card) 83'; Senesi (yellow card) 90+6'	Report	Wilson 12', 35'; Todibo (yellow card) 34'; Wan-Bissaka (yellow card) 83'	Stadium: Dean Court; Attendance: 11,216; Referee: Thomas Bramall

30 November 2025 13	West Ham United	0–2	Liverpool	Stratford
14:05 GMT	Magassa (yellow card) 66'; Paquetá (yellow card) 83' (yellow-red card) 84'	Report	Isak 60'; Gakpo 90+2'	Stadium: London Stadium; Attendance: 62,469; Referee: Darren England
Note: Fixture was initially scheduled for 29 November, but was rescheduled for live Sky Sports broadcasting.

4 December 2025 14	Manchester United	1–1	West Ham United	Trafford
20:00 GMT	Heaven (yellow card) 8'; Dalot 58'; Shaw (yellow card) 85'	Report	Diouf (yellow card) 37'; Wan-Bissaka (yellow card) 78'; Magassa 83'	Stadium: Old Trafford; Attendance: 73,938; Referee: Andrew Kitchen
Note: Fixture was initially scheduled for 3 December, but was moved for live Sky Sports broadcast.

7 December 2025 15	Brighton & Hove Albion	1–1	West Ham United	Brighton and Hove
14:00 GMT	Kadıoğlu (yellow card) 10'; Dunk (yellow card) 52'; Rutter 90+1'	Report	Rodríguez (yellow card) 60'; Bowen 73'; Potts (yellow card) 77'	Stadium: Falmer Stadium; Attendance: 31,293; Referee: Simon Hooper
Note: Fixture was initially scheduled for 6 December, but was moved for live Sky Sports broadcasting.

14 December 2025 16	West Ham United	2–3	Aston Villa	Stratford
14:00 GMT	Fernandes 1'; Bowen 24'; Diouf (yellow card) 90+2'	Report	Mavropanos 9' (o.g.); Kamara (yellow card) 38'; Cash (yellow card) 43'; Rogers 50', 79'	Stadium: London Stadium; Attendance: 62,447; Referee: Anthony Taylor
Note: Fixture was initially scheduled for 13 December, but was moved due to Aston Villa's UEFA Europa League involvements on the preceding Thursday.

20 December 2025 17	Manchester City	3–0	West Ham United	Manchester
15:00 GMT	Haaland 5', 69'; González (yellow card) 28'; Reijnders 38'	Report	Bowen (yellow card) 41'	Stadium: Etihad Stadium; Attendance: 52,454; Referee: Paul Tierney

27 December 2025 18	West Ham United	0–1	Fulham	Stratford
15:00 GMT	Todibo (yellow card) 44'	Report	Andersen (yellow card) 51'; Wilson (yellow card) 54'; Jiménez 85'; King (yellow card) 90+3'	Stadium: London Stadium; Attendance: 62,464; Referee: Chris Kavanagh

30 December 2025 19	West Ham United	2–2	Brighton & Hove Albion	Stratford
19:30 GMT	Bowen 10', (yellow card) 13'; Fernandes (yellow card) 37'; Kilman (yellow card) 45'; Paquetá 45+4' (pen.)	Report	Welbeck 32' (pen.), (penalty missed) 36', (yellow card) 37'; Milner (yellow card) 42'; Dunk (yellow card) 45+2'; Veltman 61'; Kostoulas (yellow card) 84'; Van Hecke (yellow card) 90+3'	Stadium: London Stadium; Attendance: 62,438; Referee: Michael Salisbury
Note: Fixture was initially scheduled for a 20:00 kick-off, but was rescheduled for live Sky Sports broadcasting.

3 January 2026 20	Wolverhampton Wanderers	3–0	West Ham United	Wolverhampton
15:00 GMT	Arias 4'; Hwang Hee-chan 31' (pen.); Mané 41'; Tchatchoua (yellow card) 85'	Report		Stadium: Molineux Stadium; Attendance: 29,874; Referee: Peter Bankes

6 January 2026 21	West Ham United	1–2	Nottingham Forest	Stratford
20:00 GMT	Murillo 13' (o.g.); Todibo (yellow card) 61'; Walker-Peters (yellow card) 90+4'; Mavropanos (yellow card) 90+6'	Report	Domínguez 55'; Gibbs-White 89' (pen.)	Stadium: London Stadium; Attendance: 62,429; Referee: Tony Harrington
Note: Fixture was initially scheduled for 7 January, but was rescheduled for live Sky Sports broadcasting.

17 January 2026 22	Tottenham Hotspur	1–2	West Ham United	Tottenham
15:00 GMT	Davies (yellow card) 19'; Gray (yellow card) 39'; Romero (yellow card) 45+1', (goal) 64'; Van de Ven (yellow card) 57'; Spence (yellow card) 78'	Report	Castellanos (yellow card) 1'; Summerville 15'; Bowen (yellow card) 52'; Souček (yellow card) 72'; Wilson 90+3'	Stadium: Tottenham Hotspur Stadium; Attendance: 60,857; Referee: Jarred Gillett

24 January 2026 23	West Ham United	3–1	Sunderland	Stratford
12:30 GMT	Summerville 14'; Bowen 28' (pen.); Fernandes 43', (yellow card) 90+1'; Castellanos (yellow card) 71'	Report	Ballard (yellow card) 30'; Mandava (yellow card) 35'; Brobbey 66'; Sadiki (yellow card) 80'; Diarra (yellow card) 88'; Isidor (yellow card) 90+4'	Stadium: London Stadium; Attendance: 62,456; Referee: Thomas Bramall
Note: Fixture was initially scheduled for a 15:00 kick-off, but was rescheduled for live TNT Sports broadcasting.

31 January 2026 24	Chelsea	3–2	West Ham United	Fulham
17:30 GMT	João Pedro 57', (yellow card) 90+7'; Cucurella 70'; Caicedo (yellow card) 85'; Fernández 90+2', (yellow card) 90+3'	Report	Bowen 7'; Summerville 36'; Scarles (yellow card) 90+4'; Traoré (yellow card) 90+7'; Todibo (red card) 90+11'	Stadium: Stamford Bridge; Attendance: 39,430; Referee: Anthony Taylor
Note: Fixture was initially scheduled for a 15:00 kick-off, but was rescheduled for live Sky Sports broadcasting.

7 February 2026 25	Burnley	0–2	West Ham United	Burnley
15:00 GMT	Florentino (yellow card) 24'; Humphreys (yellow card) 76'; Laurent (yellow card) 84'	Report	Summerville 13'; Castellanos 26'; Diouf (yellow card) 40'	Stadium: Turf Moor; Attendance: 21,273; Referee: Darren England

10 February 2026 26	West Ham United	1–1	Manchester United	Stratford
20:15 GMT	Souček 50'; Fernandes (yellow card) 70'	Report	Dalot (yellow card) 57'; Šeško 90+6'	Stadium: London Stadium; Attendance: 62,473; Referee: Simon Hooper
Note: Fixture was initially scheduled for 11 February, but was rescheduled for live TNT Sports broadcasting.

21 February 2026 27	West Ham United	0–0	Bournemouth	Stratford
17:30 GMT	Souček (yellow card) 33'	Report	Senesi (yellow card) 44'	Stadium: London Stadium; Attendance: 62,437; Referee: Sam Barrott
Note: Fixture was initially scheduled for a 15:00 kick-off, but was rescheduled for live Sky Sports broadcasting.

28 February 2026 28	Liverpool	5–2	West Ham United	Liverpool
15:00 GMT	Ekitike 5'; Van Dijk 24'; Mac Allister 43'; Gakpo (yellow card) 55', (goal) 70'; Disasi 82' (o.g.); Szoboszlai (yellow card) 85'	Report	Magassa (yellow card) 45'; Souček 49'; Castellanos 75'; Summerville (yellow card) 79'	Stadium: Anfield; Attendance: 60,425; Referee: Tim Robinson

4 March 2026 29	Fulham	0–1	West Ham United	Fulham
19:30 GMT	Bassey (yellow card) 90+1'; Robinson (yellow card) 90+9'	Report	Fernandes (yellow card) 17'; Wan-Bissaka (yellow card) 41'; Summerville 65'; Kanté (yellow card) 90+9'; Bowen (yellow card) 90+10'	Stadium: Craven Cottage; Attendance: 27,191; Referee: Matt Donohue
Note: Fixture was initially scheduled for a 19:45 kick-off, but was rescheduled for live TNT Sports broadcasting.

14 March 2026 30	West Ham United	1–1	Manchester City	Stratford
20:00 GMT	Mavropanos 35'; Magassa (yellow card) 76'; Fernandes (yellow card) 89'	Report	Marmoush (yellow card) 11'; Silva 31', (yellow card) 37'	Stadium: London Stadium; Attendance: 62,459; Referee: Michael Oliver
Note: Fixture was initially scheduled for a 15:00 kick-off, but was rescheduled for live Sky Sports. It was then changed again to an evening kick-off due to Manchester City's UEFA Champions League involvements on the preceding Wednesday.

22 March 2026 31	Aston Villa	2–0	West Ham United	Birmingham
14:15 GMT	McGinn 15'; Watkins 68'	Report	Wan-Bissaka (yellow card) 45'	Stadium: Villa Park; Attendance: 42,130; Referee: Paul Tierney
Note: Fixture was initially scheduled for 21 March, but was moved back a day due to Villa's UEFA Europa League involvements on the preceding Thursday.

10 April 2026 32	West Ham United	4–0	Wolverhampton Wanderers	Stratford
20:00 BST	Fernandes (yellow card) 31'; Mavropanos 42', 83'; Castellanos (yellow card) 52', (goal) 66', 68'	Report	Bellegarde (yellow card) 9'; Mosquera (yellow card) 20'	Stadium: London Stadium; Attendance: 62,457; Referee: Jarred Gillett
Note: Fixture was initially scheduled for 11 April, but was moved for Sky Sports broadcasting.

20 April 2026 33	Crystal Palace	0–0	West Ham United	Selhurst
20:00 BST	Johnson (yellow card) 21'; Muñoz (yellow card) 90+2'	Report	Diouf (yellow card) 90+2'	Stadium: Selhurst Park; Attendance: 24,974; Referee: Darren England
Note: Fixture was initially scheduled for 18 April, but was moved for Sky Sports broadcasting.

25 April 2026 34	West Ham United	2–1	Everton	Stratford
15:00 BST	Souček 51'; Castellanos (yellow card) 70'; Wilson 90+2', (yellow card) 90+5'; Disasi (yellow card) 90+3'	Report	O'Brien (yellow card) 38'; Tarkowski (yellow card) 47'; Garner (yellow card) 63'; Dewsbury-Hall 88'; Alcaraz (yellow card) 90+9'	Stadium: London Stadium; Attendance: 62,454; Referee: Stuart Attwell

2 May 2026 35	Brentford	3–0	West Ham United	Brentford
15:00 BST	Mavropanos 15' (o.g.); Thiago 54' (pen.); Kayode (yellow card) 73'; Damsgaard 82'	Report	Castellanos (yellow card) 59'; Summerville (yellow card) 62'; Scarles (yellow card) 90+6'	Stadium: Brentford Community Stadium; Attendance: 17,194; Referee: Craig Pawson

10 May 2026 36	West Ham United	0–1	Arsenal	Stratford
16:30 BST	Castellanos (yellow card) 34'; Summerville (yellow card) 38'; Todibo (yellow card) 68'	Report	Saka (yellow card) 77'; Mosquera (yellow card) 79'; Trossard 83', (yellow card) 90+1'; Saliba (yellow card) 89'	Stadium: London Stadium; Attendance: 60,429; Referee: Chris Kavanagh
Note: Fixture was initially scheduled for 9 May, but was pushed back a day for live Sky Sports broadcasting.

17 May 2026 37	Newcastle United	3–1	West Ham United	Newcastle upon Tyne
15:00 BST	Woltemade 15'; Osula 19', 65'; Hall (yellow card) 83'	Report	Souček (yellow card) 59'; Diouf (yellow card) 67'; Castellanos 69'; Kanté (yellow card) 80'	Stadium: St James' Park; Attendance: 52,206; Referee: Jarred Gillett

24 May 2026 38	West Ham United	3–0	Leeds United	Stratford
16:00 BST	Castellanos 67'; Bowen 79'; Wilson 90+4'	Report	Bijol (yellow card) 10'; Aaronson (yellow card) 25'; Ampadu (yellow card) 87'	Stadium: London Stadium; Attendance: 62,471; Referee: Anthony Taylor

=== FA Cup ===
West Ham entered the competition in the third round, and were drawn at home to Queens Park Rangers. They were then drawn away to Burton Albion in the fourth round, at home to Brentford in the fifth round, and at home to Leeds United in the quarter-finals.

Win Draw Loss Fixtures

11 January 2026 Third round	West Ham United	2–1 (a.e.t.)	Queens Park Rangers	Stratford
14:30 GMT	Summerville 45+10'; Castellanos (yellow card) 51', (goal) 98'; Magassa (yellow card) 57'; Wan-Bissaka (yellow card) 59'	Report	Mbengue (yellow card) 54'; Kone 65', (yellow card) 69'; Kolli (yellow card) 75'; Smyth (yellow card) 118'	Stadium: London Stadium; Attendance: 58,669; Referee: Thomas Kirk

14 February 2026 Fourth round	Burton Albion	0–1 (a.e.t.)	West Ham United	Burton upon Trent
12:15 GMT	Collins (yellow card) 120+3'; Adom (yellow card) 120+3'	Report	Summerville 95'; Potts (red card) 101'; Walker-Peters (yellow card) 120+2'	Stadium: Pirelli Stadium; Attendance: 6,514; Referee: Lewis Smith

9 March 2026 Fifth round	West Ham United	2–2 (a.e.t.) (5–3 p)	Brentford	Stratford
19:30 GMT	Bowen 19', 34' (pen.); Summerville (yellow card) 80'; Souček (yellow card) 89'	Report	Thiago 28', 81' (pen.)	Stadium: London Stadium; Attendance: 48,570; Referee: Andrew Madley
	Penalties
	Bowen (penalty scored); Castellanos (penalty scored); Wilson (penalty scored); Souček (penalty scored); Mavropanos (penalty scored)		(penalty scored) Thiago; (penalty missed) Ouattara; (penalty scored) Lewis-Potter; (penalty scored) Jensen

5 April 2026 Quarter-final	West Ham United	2–2 (a.e.t.) (2–4 p)	Leeds United	Stratford
16:30 BST	Kilman (yellow card) 74'; Fernandes 90+3'; Disasi 90+6'; Walker-Peters (yellow card) 105+2'	Report	Tanaka 26'; Nmecha (yellow card) 40'; Ampadu (yellow card) 47'; Calvert-Lewin 75' (pen.); Bogle (yellow card) 90+1'	Stadium: London Stadium; Attendance: 62,260; Referee: Craig Pawson
	Penalties
	Bowen (penalty missed); Walker-Peters (penalty scored); Souček (penalty scored); Pablo (penalty missed)		(penalty missed) Piroe; (penalty scored) Calvert-Lewin; (penalty scored) Aaronson; (penalty scored) Gnonto; (penalty scored) Struijk

=== EFL Cup ===
West Ham entered the competition in the second round, and were drawn away to Wolverhampton Wanderers.

Win Draw Loss Fixtures

26 August 2025 Second round	Wolverhampton Wanderers	3–2	West Ham United	Wolverhampton
19:30 BST	Hwang Hee-chan (penalty missed) 43'; R. Gomes 43'; Agbadou (yellow card) 54'; André (yellow card) 75'; Larsen 82', 84'	Report	Souček 50'; Paquetá 63'; Ward-Prowse (yellow card) 71'	Stadium: Molineux Stadium; Attendance: 19,561; Referee: Darren England

== Statistics ==
=== Appearances and goals ===
As of match played 24 May 2026

Players with no appearances are not included on the list; italics indicate loaned in player

No.	Pos	Nat	Player	Total		Premier League		FA Cup		EFL Cup	
No.	Pos	Nat	Player	Apps	Goals	Apps	Goals	Apps	Goals	Apps	Goals
1	GK	(Denmark) DEN	Mads Hermansen	19	0	18	0	1	0	0	0
2	DF	(England) ENG	Kyle Walker-Peters	28	1	15+8	1	3+1	0	1	0
3	DF	(England) ENG	Maximilian Kilman	25	0	17+4	0	3	0	0+1	0
4	DF	(France) FRA	Axel Disasi	17	1	14	0	2+1	1	0	0
7	FW	(Netherlands) NED	Crysencio Summerville	34	7	29+2	5	1+2	2	0	0
9	FW	(England) ENG	Callum Wilson	35	7	11+21	7	1+1	0	0+1	0
11	FW	(Argentina) ARG	Taty Castellanos	22	7	17+1	6	2+2	1	0	0
12	DF	(Senegal) SEN	El Hadji Malick Diouf	34	0	30+2	0	1	0	1	0
15	DF	(Greece) GRE	Konstantinos Mavropanos	35	3	27+4	3	3	0	1	0
17	FW	(Spain) ESP	Adama Traoré	12	0	0+9	0	3	0	0	0
18	MF	(Portugal) POR	Mateus Fernandes	38	4	35+1	3	2	1	0	0
19	FW	(Brazil) BRA	Pablo	17	0	10+4	0	1+2	0	0	0
20	FW	(England) ENG	Jarrod Bowen	42	11	38	9	3	2	1	0
21	MF	(Venezuela) VEN	Keiber Lamadrid	1	0	0	0	1	0	0	0
23	GK	(France) FRA	Alphonse Areola	24	0	20	0	3	0	1	0
25	DF	(France) FRA	Jean-Clair Todibo	25	0	22+1	0	1	0	1	0
27	MF	(France) FRA	Soungoutou Magassa	26	1	11+11	1	3+1	0	0	0
28	MF	(Czech Republic) CZE	Tomáš Souček	39	6	24+11	5	1+2	0	1	1
29	DF	(Democratic Republic of the Congo) COD	Aaron Wan-Bissaka	27	0	23+2	0	1+1	0	0	0
30	DF	(England) ENG	Oliver Scarles	17	0	9+4	0	2+2	0	0	0
32	MF	(England) ENG	Freddie Potts	25	0	12+10	0	2+1	0	0	0
49	GK	(England) ENG	Finlay Herrick	1	0	0	0	0+1	0	0	0
55	MF	(France) FRA	Mohamadou Kanté	14	0	0+11	0	2+1	0	0	0
61	MF	(England) ENG	Lewis Orford	1	0	0	0	0+1	0	0	0
63	DF	(England) ENG	Ezra Mayers	10	0	0+6	0	2+2	0	0	0
Players who featured but departed the club permanently during the season:
5	DF	(Morocco) MAR	Nayef Aguerd	2	0	2	0	0	0	0	0
10	MF	(Brazil) BRA	Lucas Paquetá	18	5	17	4	0	0	1	1
17	FW	(Brazil) BRA	Luis Guilherme	5	0	1+4	0	0	0	0	0
24	MF	(Argentina) ARG	Guido Rodríguez	8	0	2+4	0	0+1	0	1	0
39	MF	(Scotland) SCO	Andy Irving	7	0	2+5	0	0	0	0	0
Player who featured whilst on loan but returned to parent club during the season:
5	DF	(Brazil) BRA	Igor Julio	4	0	1+3	0	0	0	0	0
Players who featured but departed the club on loan during the season:
8	MF	(England) ENG	James Ward-Prowse	6	0	5	0	0	0	1	0
11	FW	(Germany) GER	Niclas Füllkrug	10	0	6+3	0	0	0	0+1	0
40	MF	(England) ENG	George Earthy	1	0	0+1	0	0	0	0	0
50	FW	(Northern Ireland) NIR	Callum Marshall	2	0	0+2	0	0	0	0	0

=== Goalscorers ===
As of match played 24 May 2026

Rank	Pos.	No.	Nat.	Player	Premier League	FA Cup	EFL Cup	Total
1	FW	20	(England)	Jarrod Bowen	9	2	0	11
2=	FW	7	(Netherlands)	Crysencio Summerville	5	2	0	7
2=	FW	9	(England)	Callum Wilson	7	0	0	7
2=	FW	11	(Argentina)	Taty Castellanos	6	1	0	7
5	MF	28	(Czech Republic)	Tomáš Souček	5	0	1	6
6	MF	10	(Brazil)	Lucas Paquetá	4	0	1	5
7	MF	18	(Portugal)	Mateus Fernandes	3	1	0	4
8	DF	15	(Greece)	Konstantinos Mavropanos	3	0	0	3
9=	DF	2	(England)	Kyle Walker-Peters	1	0	0	1
9=	DF	4	(France)	Axel Disasi	0	1	0	1
9=	MF	27	(France)	Soungoutou Magassa	1	0	0	1
Own goals					2	0	0	2
Totals					46	7	2	55

=== Discipline ===
As of match played 24 May 2026

No.	Pos.	Player	Premier League			FA Cup			EFL Cup			Total		
No.	Pos.	Player	Yellow card	(yellow card) (yellow-red card)	Red card	Yellow card	(yellow card) (yellow-red card)	Red card	Yellow card	(yellow card) (yellow-red card)	Red card	Yellow card	(yellow card) (yellow-red card)	Red card
2	DF	(England) Kyle Walker-Peters	2	0	0	2	0	0	0	0	0	4	0	0
3	DF	(England) Maximilian Kilman	4	0	0	1	0	0	0	0	0	5	0	0
4	DF	(France) Axel Disasi	1	0	0	0	0	0	0	0	0	1	0	0
7	FW	(Netherlands) Crysencio Summerville	6	0	0	1	0	0	0	0	0	7	0	0
8	MF	(England) James Ward-Prowse	0	0	0	0	0	0	1	0	0	1	0	0
9	FW	(England) Callum Wilson	1	0	0	0	0	0	0	0	0	1	0	0
10	MF	(Brazil) Lucas Paquetá	5	1	0	0	0	0	0	0	0	5	1	0
11	FW	(Argentina) Taty Castellanos	6	0	0	1	0	0	0	0	0	7	0	0
12	DF	(Senegal) El Hadji Malick Diouf	6	0	0	0	0	0	0	0	0	6	0	0
15	DF	(Greece) Konstantinos Mavropanos	2	0	0	0	0	0	0	0	0	2	0	0
17	FW	(Spain) Adama Traoré	1	0	0	0	0	0	0	0	0	1	0	0
18	MF	(Portugal) Mateus Fernandes	7	0	0	0	0	0	0	0	0	7	0	0
20	FW	(England) Jarrod Bowen	4	0	0	0	0	0	0	0	0	4	0	0
24	MF	(Argentina) Guido Rodríguez	1	0	0	0	0	0	0	0	0	1	0	0
25	DF	(France) Jean-Clair Todibo	5	0	1	0	0	0	0	0	0	5	0	1
27	MF	(France) Soungoutou Magassa	4	0	0	1	0	0	0	0	0	5	0	0
28	MF	(Czech Republic) Tomáš Souček	3	0	1	1	0	0	0	0	0	4	0	1
29	DF	(Democratic Republic of the Congo) Aaron Wan-Bissaka	4	0	0	1	0	0	0	0	0	5	0	0
17	FW	(England) Oliver Scarles	2	0	0	0	0	0	0	0	0	2	0	0
32	MF	(England) Freddie Potts	1	0	0	0	0	1	0	0	0	1	0	1
55	MF	(France) Mohamadou Kante	2	0	0	0	0	0	0	0	0	2	0	0
Totals			65	1	2	8	0	1	1	0	0	74	1	3

=== Clean sheets ===
As of match played 24 May 2026

The list is sorted by shirt number when total clean sheets are equal.

Rank	No.	Nat	Player	Premier League	FA Cup	EFL Cup	Total
1	1	(Denmark)	Mads Hermansen	7	0	0	7
2	23	(France)	Alphonse Areola	0	1	0	1
Totals				7	1	0	8
