= 2018–19 Tottenham Hotspur F.C. season =

English football club season

Tottenham Hotspur
2018–19 season
- Owner: ENIC International Ltd.
- Chairman: Daniel Levy
- Manager: Mauricio Pochettino
- Stadium: Wembley Stadium (until 2 March 2019); Tottenham Hotspur Stadium (from 3 April 2019)
- Premier League: 4th
- FA Cup: Fourth round
- EFL Cup: Semi-finals
- UEFA Champions League: Runners-up
- Top goalscorer: League: Harry Kane (17); All: Harry Kane (24)
- Highest home attendance: All: 82,137 (3 October 2018 v. Barcelona, UEFA CL); Premier League: 81,332 (2 March 2019 v. Arsenal)
- Lowest home attendance: All: 23,650 (26 September 2018 v. Watford, EFL Cup); Premier League: 29,164 (30 January 2019 v. Watford)
- Average home league attendance: All: 54,216 Wembley: 52,584 Tottenham: 58,788
- Biggest win: 7–0 (30 January 2019 v. Tranmere Rovers, FA Cup)
- Biggest defeat: 2–4 (3 October 2018 v. Barcelona, UEFA CL)
Home colours	Away colours	Third colours

The 2018–19 season was Tottenham Hotspur's 27th season in the Premier League and 41st successive season in the top division of the English football league system. Along with the league, the club competed in the FA Cup, EFL Cup and UEFA Champions League.

The club finished fourth in the Premier League, qualifying for next season's Champions League, and were eliminated by Crystal Palace in the fourth round of the FA Cup. Additionally, they reached the semi-finals of the EFL Cup where they faced Chelsea. After two legs the aggregate score was 2–2 and Spurs were eliminated 4–2 on penalties. However, after overcoming Ajax on away goals after two very dramatic legs in the semi-finals, Tottenham reached the Champions League final for the first time in the club's history. In an all-English affair, Tottenham lost 0–2 to Liverpool at the Wanda Metropolitano in Madrid.

Notably, the club made no signings during both the summer and January transfer windows. This was the first time in Premier League history where this has been done.

For the majority of the season, the club's matches were played at Wembley Stadium due to the development of the Tottenham Hotspur Stadium. On 3 April 2019, the new stadium opened, with the first match being a Premier League game against Crystal Palace. Tottenham won 2–0, with Son Heung-min scoring the first goal at their new ground.

== First-team squad ==
Squad no.	Name	Nationality	Position(s)	Date of birth (age)
Goalkeepers
1	Hugo Lloris (captain)	(France)	GK	26 December 1986 (aged 32)
13	Michel Vorm	(Netherlands)	GK	20 October 1983 (aged 35)
22	Paulo Gazzaniga	(Argentina)	GK	2 January 1992 (aged 27)
Defenders
2	Kieran Trippier	(England)	RB / RWB	19 September 1990 (aged 28)
3	Danny Rose	(England)	LB / LWB	2 July 1990 (aged 28)
4	Toby Alderweireld	(Belgium)	CB / RB	2 March 1989 (aged 30)
5	Jan Vertonghen (2nd vice-captain)	(Belgium)	CB / LB	24 April 1987 (aged 32)
6	Davinson Sánchez	(Colombia)	CB / RB	12 June 1996 (aged 23)
16	Kyle Walker-Peters	(England)	RB / LB	13 April 1997 (aged 22)
21	Juan Foyth	(Argentina)	CB / DM	12 January 1998 (aged 21)
24	Serge Aurier	(Ivory Coast)	RB / RWB	24 December 1992 (aged 26)
33	Ben Davies	(Wales)	LB / LWB / CB	24 April 1993 (aged 26)
38	Cameron Carter-Vickers	(United States)	CB	31 December 1997 (aged 21)
Midfielders
8	Harry Winks	(England)	CM / DM	2 February 1996 (aged 23)
11	Erik Lamela	(Argentina)	RW / LW	4 March 1992 (aged 27)
12	Victor Wanyama	(Kenya)	DM / CM	25 June 1991 (aged 28)
14	Georges-Kévin Nkoudou	(France)	LW	13 February 1995 (aged 24)
15	Eric Dier	(England)	DM / CB	15 January 1994 (aged 25)
17	Moussa Sissoko	(France)	CM / RM	16 August 1989 (aged 29)
20	Dele Alli	(England)	CM / AM	11 April 1996 (aged 23)
23	Christian Eriksen	(Denmark)	AM / LW / RW	14 February 1992 (aged 27)
25	Josh Onomah	(England)	CM	27 April 1997 (aged 22)
27	Lucas Moura	(Brazil)	RW	13 August 1992 (aged 26)
40	Luke Amos	(England)	CM / DM	23 February 1997 (aged 22)
52	Oliver Skipp	(England)	CM / DM	16 September 2000 (aged 18)
Forwards
7	Son Heung-min	(South Korea)	ST / LW / RW	8 July 1992 (aged 26)
9	Vincent Janssen	(Netherlands)	ST	15 June 1994 (aged 25)
10	Harry Kane (1st vice-captain)	(England)	ST / SS	28 July 1993 (aged 25)
18	Fernando Llorente	(Spain)	FW	26 February 1985 (aged 34)

Last updated: 15 August 2018.
Source: Tottenham Hotspur F.C., premierleague.com

== Transfers ==
=== Released ===
Date from	Position	Nationality	Name	To	Fee	Ref.
8 June 2018	ST	(England)	Ryan Loft	Leicester City	Released	(Note: Following Loft's release he joined Leicester City.)
8 June 2018	DF	(Democratic Republic of the Congo)	Christian Maghoma	(Poland) Arka Gdynia	Released	(Note: Following Maghoma's release he joined Polish side Arka Gdynia.)
8 June 2018	GK	(England)	Luke O'Reilly	Carlisle United	Released	(Note: Following O'Reilly's release he joined Carlisle United.)
8 June 2018	MF	(England)	Joe Pritchard	Bolton Wanderers	Released	(Note: Following Pritchard's release he joined Bolton Wanderers.)
8 June 2018	DF	(England)	Nick Tsaroulla	Free agent	Released	
8 June 2018	DF	(England)	Matthew Lock	Free agent	Released	

=== Transfers out ===
Date from	Position	Nationality	Name	To	Fee	Ref.
18 May 2018	MF	(England)	Keanan Bennetts	(Germany) Borussia Mönchengladbach	£2,000,000	
4 July 2018	DF	(Scotland)	Kane Patterson	Burnley	Undisclosed	
6 July 2018	MF	(England)	Noni Madueke	(Netherlands) PSV Eindhoven	Undisclosed	
18 July 2018	DF	(England)	Anton Walkes	Portsmouth	Undisclosed	
1 August 2018	ST	(England)	Reo Griffiths	(France) Olympique Lyonnais	Undisclosed	
1 January 2019	DF	(England)	Jaden Brown	Huddersfield Town	Free transfer	
17 January 2019	MF	(Belgium)	Mousa Dembélé	(China) Guangzhou R&F	£11,000,000	

=== Loans out ===
Start date	Position	Nationality	Name	To	End date	Ref.
25 August 2018	DF	(United States)	Cameron Carter-Vickers	(Wales) Swansea City	31 May 2019	
26 August 2018	MF	(England)	Samuel Shashoua	(Spain) Atlético Baleares	31 May 2019	
30 August 2018	MF	(England)	Marcus Edwards	(Netherlands) Excelsior	31 May 2019	
31 August 2018	DF	(England)	Connor Ogilvie	Gillingham	31 May 2019	(Note: On 5 January 2019, it was announced that Ogilvie would stay at Gillingham until the end of the season. His loan was initially to end on 31 December 2018.)
31 August 2018	MF	(England)	Josh Onomah	Sheffield Wednesday	31 May 2019	
31 January 2019	MF	(France)	Georges-Kévin Nkoudou	(France) Monaco	31 May 2019	
31 January 2019	MF	(Cyprus)	Anthony Georgiou	(Spain) Levante	31 May 2019	
31 January 2019	FW	(England)	Shayon Harrison	(Australia) Melbourne City	31 May 2019	
31 January 2019	FW	(England)	Kazaiah Sterling	Sunderland	31 May 2019	
3 April 2019	GK	(Australia)	Tom Glover	(Sweden) Helsingborgs IF	30 June 2019	

=== Overall transfer activity ===
==== Expenditure ====
Summer: £0

Winter: £0

Total: £0

==== Income ====
Summer: ▲£2,000,000

Winter: ▲£11,000,000

Total: ▲£13,000,000

==== Net totals ====
Summer: ▲£2,000,000

Winter: ▲£11,000,000

Total: ▲£13,000,000

== Friendlies ==
=== Pre-season ===
Tottenham took part in the 2018 International Champions Cup with scheduled games against A.C. Milan, Barcelona and Roma. After the three games played by all teams taking part Tottenham was declared champions having accumulated seven points and the best goal difference.

==== 2018 International Champions Cup ====
25 July 2018 Int. Champions Cup	Roma	1–4	Tottenham Hotspur	San Diego, United States
19:00 PDT	Schick 3'; Lu. Pellegrini (yellow card) 34'	Report	Llorente 9', 18'; Lucas Moura 28', 44'	Stadium: SDCCU Stadium; Attendance: 18,861; Referee: Alejandro Mariscal (United States)

28 July 2018 Int. Champions Cup	Barcelona	2–2 (5–3 p)	Tottenham Hotspur	Pasadena, United States
20:00 PDT	Munir 15'; Arthur 29'	Report	Son 73'; Nkoudou 75'	Stadium: Rose Bowl; Attendance: 66,805; Referee: Kevin Stott (United States)
	Penalties
	Palencia (penalty scored); Ruiz (penalty scored); Monchu (penalty scored); Puig (penalty scored); Malcom (penalty scored)		(penalty scored) Son; (penalty scored) Davies; (penalty missed) Georgiou; (penalty scored) Sánchez

31 July 2018 Int. Champions Cup	Tottenham Hotspur	1–0	Milan	Minneapolis, United States
19:30 CDT	Nkoudou 47'; Eyoma (yellow card) 53'	Report	Mauri (yellow card) 81'; Kessié (yellow card) 84'	Stadium: U.S. Bank Stadium; Attendance: 31,264; Referee: Ismail Elfath (United States)

Win Draw Loss

==== Friendlies ====
18 July 2018 Friendly	Tottenham Hotspur	6–0	Southend United	Enfield
	Lamela 7',, Llorente 11'; Lucas Moura 27'; Oakley-Boothe 78'	Report		Stadium: Hotspur Way; Attendance: 0

21 July 2018 Friendly	Tottenham Hotspur	2–1	Brentford	Enfield
	Llorente 38'; Nkoudou 90'	Report	Maupay 59'	Stadium: Hotspur Way; Attendance: 0

==== 2018 Costa Brava Trophy ====
4 August 2018 Costa Brava Trophy	Girona	4–1	Tottenham Hotspur	Girona, Spain
19:00 BST	Juanpe 22'; Lozano 34'; B. García (yellow card) 35'; Granell (yellow card) 44'; Muniesa (yellow card) 45+2'; Portu 53'; A. García 61'; Soni (yellow card) 66'	Report	Lucas Moura 13'	Stadium: Estadi Montilivi; Attendance: 7,340; Referee: José Luis Munuera Montero (Spain)

== Competitions ==
=== Overview ===
Competition	Record							
Competition	Pld	W	D	L	GF	GA	GD	Win %
Premier League	38	23	2	13	67	39	+28	60.53
FA Cup	2	1	0	1	7	2	+5	50.00
EFL Cup	5	3	1	1	9	5	+4	60.00
Champions League	13	6	2	5	20	19	+1	46.15
Total	58	33	5	20	103	65	+38	56.90

Source: Competitions

=== Premier League ===
==== League table ====
Pos	Team	Pld	W	D	L	GF	GA	GD	Pts	Qualification or relegation
2	Liverpool	38	30	7	1	89	22	+67	97	Qualification to Champions League group stage
3	Chelsea	38	21	9	8	63	39	+24	72	Qualification to Champions League group stage
4	Tottenham Hotspur	38	23	2	13	67	39	+28	71	Qualification to Champions League group stage
5	Arsenal	38	21	7	10	73	51	+22	70	Qualification to Europa League group stage (Note: Since the winners of the EFL Cup and the FA Cup, Manchester City, qualified for the Champions League, the spot given to the FA Cup winners (Europa League group stage) was passed to the sixth-placed team and the spot given to the League Cup winners (Europa League second qualifying round) was passed to the seventh-placed team.)
6	Manchester United	38	19	9	10	65	54	+11	66	Qualification to Europa League group stage

Source: Premier League
Rules for classification: 1) Points; 2) Goal difference; 3) Goals scored; 4) Play-offs (only if needed to decide champion, teams for relegation or teams for UEFA competitions).

==== Results summary ====
Overall								Home						Away					
Pld	W	D	L	GF	GA	GD	Pts	W	D	L	GF	GA	GD	W	D	L	GF	GA	GD
38	23	2	13	67	39	+28	71	12	2	5	34	16	+18	11	0	8	33	23	+10

Last updated: 12 May 2019.
Source: Premier League

==== Results by matchday ====
Matchday	1	2	3	4	5	6	7	8	9	10	11	12	13	14	15	16	17	18	19	20	21	22	23	24	25	26	27	28	29	30	31	32	33	34	35	36	37	38
Ground	A	H	A	A	H	A	A	H	A	H	A	A	H	A	H	A	H	A	H	H	A	H	A	H	H	H	A	A	H	A	A	H	H	A	H	H	A	H
Result	W	W	W	L	L	W	W	W	W	L	W	W	W	L	W	W	W	W	W	L	W	L	W	W	W	W	L	L	D	L	L	W	W	L	W	L	L	D
Position	8	5	2	5	6	5	4	5	5	5	4	4	3	5	3	3	3	3	2	3	3	3	3	3	3	3	3	3	3	3	3	3	3	3	3	3	4	4

Updated to match(es) played on 12 May 2019. Source: Premier League
A = Away; H = Home; W = Win; D = Draw; L = Loss

==== Fixtures ====
On 14 June 2018, the Premier League fixtures for the forthcoming season were announced. Owing to delays in the completion of the club's new stadium, the first fourteen home games of the season were played at Wembley. Some fixtures were updated after Sky Sports announced their live TV coverage.

11 August 2018 1	Newcastle United	1–2	Tottenham Hotspur	Newcastle upon Tyne
12:30 BST	Joselu 11', (yellow card) 58'; Diamé (yellow card) 90'	Report	Vertonghen 8'; Alli 18'; Dier (yellow card) 42'; Kane (yellow card) 68'	Stadium: St James' Park; Attendance: 51,749; Referee: Martin Atkinson

18 August 2018 2	Tottenham Hotspur	3–1	Fulham	Wembley
15:00 BST	Lucas Moura 43'; Trippier 74'; Kane 77'	Report	Mitrović 52'	Stadium: Wembley Stadium; Attendance: 58,297; Referee: Anthony Taylor

27 August 2018 3	Manchester United	0–3	Tottenham Hotspur	Greater Manchester
20:00 BST	Herrera (yellow card) 19'; Valencia (yellow card) 58'	Report	Lucas Moura (yellow card) 10', (goal) 52', 84'; Kane (yellow card) 24', (goal) 50'; Rose (yellow card) 77'	Stadium: Old Trafford; Attendance: 74,400; Referee: Craig Pawson

2 September 2018 4	Watford	2–1	Tottenham Hotspur	Watford
16:00 BST	Capoue (yellow card) 52'; Deeney 69'; Cathcart 76'; Success (yellow card) 90+3'	Report	Doucouré 53' (o.g.); Dembélé (yellow card) 68'	Stadium: Vicarage Road; Attendance: 20,141; Referee: Andre Marriner

15 September 2018 5	Tottenham Hotspur	1–2	Liverpool	Wembley
12:30 BST	Lamela 90+3'	Report	Wijnaldum 39'; Firmino 54'	Stadium: Wembley Stadium; Attendance: 80,188; Referee: Michael Oliver

22 September 2018 6	Brighton & Hove Albion	1–2	Tottenham Hotspur	Falmer
17:30 BST	Kayal (yellow card) 61'; Bissouma (yellow card) 74'; Knockaert 90+3'	Report	Kane 42' (pen.); Trippier (yellow card) 49'; Lamela 76'	Stadium: Amex Stadium; Attendance: 30,531; Referee: Chris Kavanagh

29 September 2018 7	Huddersfield Town	0–2	Tottenham Hotspur	Huddersfield
15:00 BST	Jørgensen (yellow card) 44'; Billing (yellow card) 86'	Report	Kane 25', 34' (pen.); Rose (yellow card) 67'; Winks (yellow card) 81'	Stadium: John Smith's Stadium; Attendance: 23,885; Referee: Craig Pawson

6 October 2018 8	Tottenham Hotspur	1–0	Cardiff City	Wembley
15:00 BST	Dier 8'; Sánchez (yellow card) 51'; Kane (yellow card) 59'; Alderweireld (yellow card) 68'	Report	Ralls (red card) 58'; Arter (yellow card) 90+5'	Stadium: Wembley Stadium; Attendance: 43,268; Referee: Mike Dean

20 October 2018 9	West Ham United	0–1	Tottenham Hotspur	Stratford
15:00 BST	Noble (yellow card) 59'; Snodgrass (yellow card) 80'; Arnautović (yellow card) 73'	Report	Lamela 44'	Stadium: London Stadium; Attendance: 56,921; Referee: Martin Atkinson

29 October 2018 10	Tottenham Hotspur	0–1	Manchester City	Wembley
20:00 GMT	Lucas Moura (yellow card) 45'; Davies (yellow card) 90+4'	Report	Mahrez 6'; Laporte (yellow card) 53'; Fernandinho (yellow card) 61'	Stadium: Wembley Stadium; Attendance: 56,854; Referee: Kevin Friend

3 November 2018 11	Wolverhampton Wanderers	2–3	Tottenham Hotspur	Wolverhampton
19:45 GMT	Bennett (yellow card) 24'; Neves 68' (pen.); Jiménez 79' (pen.)	Report	Lamela 27'; Lucas Moura 30'; Kane 61'; Foyth (yellow card) 78'; Winks (yellow card) 87'	Stadium: Molineux Stadium; Attendance: 31,185; Referee: Mike Dean

10 November 2018 12	Crystal Palace	0–1	Tottenham Hotspur	Selhurst
17:30 GMT	Tomkins (yellow card) 40'	Report	Foyth 66'; Winks (yellow card) 86'	Stadium: Selhurst Park; Attendance: 25,685; Referee: Jonathan Moss

24 November 2018 13	Tottenham Hotspur	3–1	Chelsea	Wembley
17:30 GMT	Alli 8'; Kane 16'; Son 54'	Report	Rüdiger (yellow card) 19'; Hazard (yellow card) 45+3'; Jorginho (yellow card) 72'; Giroud 85'	Stadium: Wembley Stadium; Attendance: 55,465; Referee: Martin Atkinson

2 December 2018 14	Arsenal	4–2	Tottenham Hotspur	Holloway
14:05 GMT	Aubameyang 10' (pen.), 56'; Mustafi (yellow card) 37'; Xhaka (yellow card) 49'; Lacazette 74'; Torreira 77', (yellow card) 78'	Report	Vertonghen (yellow card) 9' (yellow-red card) 85'; Dier 30', (yellow card) 32'; Kane 34' (pen.); Alli (yellow card) 65'; Aurier (yellow card) 90'	Stadium: Emirates Stadium; Attendance: 59,973; Referee: Mike Dean

5 December 2018 15	Tottenham Hotspur	3–1	Southampton	Wembley
20:00 GMT	Kane 9'; Lucas Moura 51'; Son 55'	Report	Austin 90+3'	Stadium: Wembley Stadium; Attendance: 33,012; Referee: Anthony Taylor

8 December 2018 16	Leicester City	0–2	Tottenham Hotspur	Leicester
19:45 GMT	Mendy (yellow card) 16'; Albrighton (yellow card) 64'; Gray (yellow card) 81'	Report	Dier (yellow card) 9'; Son 45+1'; Alli 58'	Stadium: King Power Stadium; Attendance: 31,957; Referee: Craig Pawson

15 December 2018 17	Tottenham Hotspur	1–0	Burnley	Wembley
15:00 GMT	Eriksen 90+1'	Report	Brady (yellow card) 63'; Bardsley (yellow card) 68'	Stadium: Wembley Stadium; Attendance: 41,645; Referee: Graham Scott

23 December 2018 18	Everton	2–6	Tottenham Hotspur	Liverpool
16:00 GMT	Walcott 21'; Sigurðsson 51'	Report	Son 27', 61'; Trippier (yellow card) 32'; Alli 35'; Kane 42', 74'; Eriksen 48', (yellow card) 71'	Stadium: Goodison Park; Attendance: 39,319; Referee: Paul Tierney

26 December 2018 19	Tottenham Hotspur	5–0	Bournemouth	Wembley
15:00 GMT	Eriksen 16'; Son 23', 70', (yellow card) 76'; Lucas Moura 35'; Kane 61'; Winks (yellow card) 87'	Report	Lerma (yellow card) 45+4'	Stadium: Wembley Stadium; Attendance: 45,154; Referee: Chris Kavanagh

29 December 2018 20	Tottenham Hotspur	1–3	Wolverhampton Wanderers	Wembley
15:00 GMT	Davies (yellow card) 16'; Kane 22', (yellow card) 81'; Eriksen (yellow card) 42'	Report	Boly 72'; Jonny (yellow card) 81'; Jiménez 83', (yellow card) 84'; Hélder Costa 87'	Stadium: Wembley Stadium; Attendance: 46,356; Referee: Stuart Attwell

1 January 2019 21	Cardiff City	0–3	Tottenham Hotspur	Cardiff
17:30 GMT	Bamba (yellow card) 53'	Report	Kane 3'; Eriksen 12'; Son 26'	Stadium: Cardiff City Stadium; Attendance: 32,485; Referee: Kevin Friend

13 January 2019 22	Tottenham Hotspur	0–1	Manchester United	Wembley
16:30 GMT	Alli (yellow card) 50'	Report	Rashford 44'; Herrera (yellow card) 67'; Pogba (yellow card) 78'	Stadium: Wembley Stadium; Attendance: 80,062; Referee: Mike Dean

20 January 2019 23	Fulham	1–2	Tottenham Hotspur	Fulham
16:00 GMT	Llorente 17' (o.g.); Mitrović (yellow card) 74'; Seri (yellow card) 75'	Report	Alli 52'; Sánchez (yellow card) 74'; Rose (yellow card) 79'; Winks 90+3'	Stadium: Craven Cottage; Attendance: 24,807; Referee: Craig Pawson

30 January 2019 24	Tottenham Hotspur	2–1	Watford	Wembley
20:00 GMT	Son 80'; Llorente 87'	Report	Cathcart 38'; Mariappa (yellow card) 46'; Capoue (yellow card) 74'; Holebas (yellow card) 90+1'; Success (yellow card) 90+3'	Stadium: Wembley Stadium; Attendance: 29,164; Referee: Graham Scott

2 February 2019 25	Tottenham Hotspur	1–0	Newcastle United	Wembley
12:30 GMT	Son 83'	Report	Yedlin (yellow card) 65'	Stadium: Wembley Stadium; Attendance: 41,219; Referee: Andre Marriner

10 February 2019 26	Tottenham Hotspur	3–1	Leicester City	Wembley
13:30 GMT	Son (yellow card) 16', (goal) 90+1'; Rose (yellow card) 20'; Vertonghen (yellow card) 28'; Sánchez 33'; Eriksen 63'	Report	Vardy 76'; Tielemans (yellow card) 85'	Stadium: Wembley Stadium; Attendance: 44,154; Referee: Michael Oliver

23 February 2019 27	Burnley	2–1	Tottenham Hotspur	Burnley
12:30 GMT	Wood 57'; Bardsley (yellow card) 72'; Barnes 83'	Report	Kane 65'; Llorente (yellow card) 65'; Foyth (yellow card) 69'; Lamela (yellow card) 86'	Stadium: Turf Moor; Attendance: 21,338; Referee: Mike Dean

27 February 2019 28	Chelsea	2–0	Tottenham Hotspur	Fulham
20:00 GMT	Pedro 57'; Trippier 84' (o.g.); David Luiz (yellow card) 90+4'	Report	Kane (yellow card) 90+4'	Stadium: Stamford Bridge; Attendance: 40,542; Referee: Andre Marriner

2 March 2019 29	Tottenham Hotspur	1–1	Arsenal	Wembley
12:30 GMT	Lamela (yellow card) 63'; Rose (yellow card) 69'; Kane 74' (pen.); Llorente (yellow card) 84'	Report	Ramsey 16'; Mkhitaryan (yellow card) 58'; Xhaka (yellow card) 74'; Aubameyang (penalty missed) 90+1'; Torreira (red card) 90+5'	Stadium: Wembley Stadium; Attendance: 81,332; Referee: Anthony Taylor

9 March 2019 30	Southampton	2–1	Tottenham Hotspur	Southampton
15:00 GMT	Romeu (yellow card) 10'; Valery (yellow card) 22' (goal) 76'; Højbjerg (yellow card) 78'; Ward-Prowse 81'; Redmond (yellow card) 88'	Report	Kane 26'; Walker-Peters (yellow card) 79'; Sissoko (yellow card) 88'	Stadium: St Mary's Stadium; Attendance: 31,890; Referee: Kevin Friend

31 March 2019 31	Liverpool	2–1	Tottenham Hotspur	Liverpool
16:30 BST	Firmino 16'; Alderweireld 90' (o.g.)	Report	Lucas Moura 70', (yellow card) 79'	Stadium: Anfield; Attendance: 53,322; Referee: Martin Atkinson

3 April 2019 32	Tottenham Hotspur	2–0	Crystal Palace	Tottenham, London
19:45 BST	Alli (yellow card) 29'; Son 55'; Eriksen 80'	Report		Stadium: Tottenham Hotspur Stadium; Attendance: 59,215; Referee: Andre Marriner

13 April 2019 33	Tottenham Hotspur	4–0	Huddersfield Town	Tottenham, London
12:30 BST	Wanyama 24'; Lucas Moura 27', 87', 90+3'; Foyth (yellow card) 60'; Vertonghen (yellow card) 76'	Report	Löwe (yellow card) 45'; Bacuna (yellow card) 66'	Stadium: Tottenham Hotspur Stadium; Attendance: 58,308; Referee: Lee Mason

20 April 2019 34	Manchester City	1–0	Tottenham Hotspur	Manchester
12:30 BST	Foden 5'; Sterling (yellow card) 90+3'	Report	Wanyama (yellow card) 86'; Vertonghen (yellow card) 90+3'	Stadium: City of Manchester Stadium; Attendance: 54,489; Referee: Michael Oliver

23 April 2019 35	Tottenham Hotspur	1–0	Brighton & Hove Albion	Tottenham, London
19:45 BST	Eriksen (yellow card) 46', (goal) 88'	Report	Andone (yellow card) 35'; Bernardo (yellow card) 75'	Stadium: Tottenham Hotspur Stadium; Attendance: 56,251; Referee: Chris Kavanagh

27 April 2019 36	Tottenham Hotspur	0–1	West Ham United	Tottenham, London
12:30 BST		Report	Snodgrass (yellow card) 26'; Antonio 67'; Fredericks (yellow card) 86'	Stadium: Tottenham Hotspur Stadium; Attendance: 60,043; Referee: Anthony Taylor

4 May 2019 37	Bournemouth	1–0	Tottenham Hotspur	Bournemouth
12:30 BST	Aké 90+1'; Lerma (yellow card) 90+4'	Report	Dier (yellow card) 11'; Alderweireld (yellow card) 23'; Sissoko (yellow card) 40'; Son (red card) 43'; Foyth (red card) 48'; Wanyama (yellow card) 90+3'; Alli (yellow card) 90+3'	Stadium: Vitality Stadium; Attendance: 10,630; Referee: Craig Pawson

12 May 2019 38	Tottenham Hotspur	2–2	Everton	Tottenham, London
15:00 BST	Dier 3'; Eriksen 75'	Report	Walcott 69'; Schneiderlin (yellow card) 71'; Tosun 72'; Digne (yellow card) 90'	Stadium: Tottenham Hotspur Stadium; Attendance: 60,124; Referee: Andre Marriner

=== FA Cup ===
Tottenham entered the competition in the third round and were handed an away tie at either Tranmere Rovers or Southport. Tranmere Rovers won the replay 2–0, claiming the home draw to play Spurs.

4 January 2019 Third round	Tranmere Rovers	0–7	Tottenham Hotspur	Birkenhead
19:45 GMT	Banks (yellow card) 87'	Report	Aurier 40', 55'; Llorente 48', 71', 72'; Son 57'; Kane 82'	Stadium: Prenton Park; Attendance: 12,553; Referee: Andre Marriner

27 January 2019 Fourth round	Crystal Palace	2–0	Tottenham Hotspur	Selhurst
16:00 GMT	Wickham 9'; Townsend 34' (pen.); Benteke (yellow card) 90+2'; Zaha (yellow card) 90+3'	Report	Sánchez (yellow card) 55'; Foyth (yellow card) 59'	Stadium: Selhurst Park; Attendance: 19,491; Referee: Kevin Friend

=== EFL Cup ===
Due to Wembley Stadium not being available, and Tottenham's new stadium not being complete, the third-round tie against Watford took place at Stadium MK, the home of Milton Keynes Dons.

26 September 2018 Third round	Tottenham Hotspur	2–2 (4–2 p)	Watford	Milton Keynes
20:00 BST	Alli 82' (pen.); Lamela 86', (yellow card) 87'	Report	Success 46'; Kabasele (red card) 81'; Capoue 89'	Stadium: Stadium MK; Attendance: 23,650; Referee: Lee Mason
	Penalties
	Son (penalty scored); Lamela (penalty scored); Llorente (penalty scored); Alli (penalty scored)		(penalty scored) Success; (penalty missed) Capoue; (penalty scored) Hughes; (penalty missed) Quina
Note: This match was moved to Stadium MK in Milton Keynes, as neither Wembley Stadium nor Tottenham Hotspur Stadium were available to host.

31 October 2018 Fourth round	West Ham United	1–3	Tottenham Hotspur	Stratford
19:45 GMT	Pérez 71'	Report	Son 16', 54'; Llorente 75'	Stadium: London Stadium; Attendance: 50,270; Referee: Stuart Attwell

19 December 2018 Quarter-finals	Arsenal	0–2	Tottenham Hotspur	Holloway
19:45 GMT	Guendouzi (yellow card) 45+2'; Xhaka (yellow card) 77'	Report	Son 21'; Alli 59', (yellow card) 85'; Eriksen (yellow card) 90+4'	Stadium: Emirates Stadium; Attendance: 59,016; Referee: Jonathan Moss

8 January 2019 Semi-final first leg	Tottenham Hotspur	1–0	Chelsea	Wembley
19:45 GMT	Kane 26' (pen.); Winks (yellow card) 29'; Sánchez (yellow card) 59'; Lamela (yellow card) 82'	Report	Arrizabalaga (yellow card) 25'	Stadium: Wembley Stadium; Attendance: 44,371; Referee: Michael Oliver

24 January 2019 Semi-final second leg	Chelsea	2–1 (2–2 agg.) (4–2 p)	Tottenham Hotspur	Fulham
19:45 GMT	Kanté 27', (yellow card) 56'; Hazard 38'; Jorginho (yellow card) 53'; Azpilicueta (yellow card) 66'	Report	Llorente 50'; Sissoko (yellow card) 73'	Stadium: Stamford Bridge; Attendance: 38,610; Referee: Martin Atkinson
	Penalties
	Willian (penalty scored); Azpilicueta (penalty scored); Jorginho (penalty scored); David Luiz (penalty scored)		(penalty scored) Eriksen; (penalty scored) Lamela; (penalty missed) Dier; (penalty missed) Lucas Moura

=== UEFA Champions League ===
==== Group stage ====
Pos	Team	Pld	W	D	L	GF	GA	GD	Pts	Qualification	BAR	TOT	INT	PSV
1	(Spain) Barcelona	6	4	2	0	14	5	+9	14	Advance to knockout phase	—	1–1	2–0	4–0
2	(England) Tottenham Hotspur	6	2	2	2	9	10	−1	8 (Note: Head-to-head away goals: Tottenham Hotspur 1, Inter Milan 0.)	Advance to knockout phase	2–4	—	1–0	2–1
3	(Italy) Inter Milan	6	2	2	2	6	7	−1	8	Transfer to Europa League	1–1	2–1	—	1–1
4	(Netherlands) PSV Eindhoven	6	0	2	4	6	13	−7	2		1–2	2–2	1–2	—

Source: UEFA
Notes:

18 September 2018 1	Internazionale (Italy)	2–1	(England) Tottenham Hotspur	Milan, Italy
17:55 BST	Škriniar (yellow card) 21'; Perišić (yellow card) 43'; Icardi 86'; Vecino 90+2'	Report	Sánchez (yellow card) 38'; Vertonghen (yellow card) 51'; Eriksen 53'; Vorm (yellow card) 82'	Stadium: San Siro; Attendance: 64,123; Referee: Clément Turpin (France)

3 October 2018 2	Tottenham Hotspur (England)	2–4	(Spain) Barcelona	London, England
20:00 BST	Alderweireld (yellow card) 14'; Wanyama (yellow card) 41'; Lamela (yellow card) 43', (goal) 66'; Kane 52', (yellow card) 74'; Dier (yellow card) 90+3'	Report	Coutinho 2'; Rakitić 28'; Messi 56', 90'; Arthur (yellow card) 59'; Busquets (yellow card) 71'	Stadium: Wembley Stadium; Attendance: 82,137; Referee: Felix Zwayer (Germany)

24 October 2018 3	PSV Eindhoven (Netherlands)	2–2	(England) Tottenham Hotspur	Eindhoven, Netherlands
17:55 BST	Lozano 30'; Angeliño (yellow card) 59'; De Jong 87'; Dumfries (yellow card) 90+1'; Rosario (yellow card) 90+5'	Report	Dembélé (yellow card) 20'; Lucas Moura 39'; Kane 55'; Lloris (red card) 79'	Stadium: Philips Stadion; Attendance: 35,000; Referee: Slavko Vinčić (Slovenia)

6 November 2018 4	Tottenham Hotspur (England)	2–1	(Netherlands) PSV Eindhoven	London, England
20:00 GMT	Son (yellow card) 63'; Kane 78', 89'; Trippier (yellow card) 90+5'	Report	De Jong 2'; Lozano (yellow card) 38'; Schwaab (yellow card) 90+3'	Stadium: Wembley Stadium; Attendance: 46,588; Referee: Ivan Kružliak (Slovakia)

28 November 2018 5	Tottenham Hotspur (England)	1–0	(Italy) Internazionale	London, England
20:00 GMT	Alderweireld (yellow card) 28'; Lamela (yellow card) 45'; Son (yellow card) 73'; Eriksen 80'	Report	De Vrij (yellow card) 70'; Valero (yellow card) 81'	Stadium: Wembley Stadium; Attendance: 57,132; Referee: Cüneyt Çakır (Turkey)

11 December 2018 6	Barcelona (Spain)	1–1	(England) Tottenham Hotspur	Barcelona, Spain
20:00 GMT	O. Dembélé 7'; Semedo (yellow card) 68'	Report	Walker-Peters (yellow card) 15'; Lucas Moura 85'	Stadium: Camp Nou; Attendance: 69,961; Referee: Milorad Mažić (Serbia)

==== Knockout phase ====
===== Round of 16 =====
13 February 2019 First leg	Tottenham Hotspur (England)	3–0	(Germany) Borussia Dortmund	London, England
20:00 GMT	Aurier (yellow card) 12'; Son 47'; Vertonghen 83'; Llorente 86'	Report	Delaney (yellow card) 53'	Stadium: Wembley Stadium; Attendance: 71,214; Referee: Antonio Mateu Lahoz (Spain)

5 March 2019 Second leg	Borussia Dortmund (Germany)	0–1 (0–4 agg.)	(England) Tottenham Hotspur	Dortmund, Germany
20:00 GMT		Report	Kane 49'	Stadium: Westfalenstadion; Attendance: 66,099; Referee: Danny Makkelie (Netherlands)

===== Quarter-finals =====
9 April 2019 First leg	Tottenham Hotspur (England)	1–0	(England) Manchester City	London, England
20:00 BST	Rose (yellow card) 12'; Son 78'	Report	Agüero (penalty missed) 13'; Laporte (yellow card) 28'; Mahrez (yellow card) 59'	Stadium: Tottenham Hotspur Stadium; Attendance: 60,044; Referee: Björn Kuipers (Netherlands)

17 April 2019 Second leg	Manchester City (England)	4–3 (4–4 (a) agg.)	(England) Tottenham Hotspur	Manchester, England
20:00 BST	Sterling 4', 21'; B. Silva 11'; Agüero 59'	Report	Son 7', 10', (yellow card) 48'; Sissoko (yellow card) 41'; Rose (yellow card) 54'; Llorente 73'; Wanyama (yellow card) 77'	Stadium: City of Manchester Stadium; Attendance: 53,348; Referee: Cüneyt Çakır (Turkey)

===== Semi-finals =====
30 April 2019 First leg	Tottenham Hotspur (England)	0–1	(Netherlands) Ajax	London, England
20:00 BST		Report	Van de Beek 15'; Tagliafico (yellow card) 30'; Veltman (yellow card) 63'	Stadium: Tottenham Hotspur Stadium; Attendance: 60,243; Referee: Antonio Mateu Lahoz (Spain)

8 May 2019 Second leg	Ajax (Netherlands)	2–3 (3–3 (a) agg.)	(England) Tottenham Hotspur	Amsterdam, Netherlands
20:00 BST	De Ligt 5'; Ziyech 35', (yellow card) 77'; Dolberg (yellow card) 50'; Onana (yellow card) 90+5'	Report	Sissoko (yellow card) 16'; Lucas 55', 59', 90+6'; Rose (yellow card) 76'	Stadium: Johan Cruyff Arena; Attendance: 52,641; Referee: Felix Brych (Germany)

===== Final =====
1 June 2019 Final	Tottenham Hotspur (England)	0–2	(England) Liverpool	Madrid, Spain
20:00 BST		Report	Salah 2' (pen.); Origi 87'	Stadium: Wanda Metropolitano; Attendance: 63,272; Referee: Damir Skomina (Slovenia)

== Statistics ==
=== Appearances ===
Last updated: 2 June 2019.
Source: premierleague.com, uefa.com

No.	Pos.	Name	Premier League		FA Cup		EFL Cup		Champions League		Total	
No.	Pos.	Name	Apps	Goals	Apps	Goals	Apps	Goals	Apps	Goals	Apps	Goals
Goalkeepers
1	GK	(France) Hugo Lloris	33	0	0	0	0	0	11	0	44	0
13	GK	(Netherlands) Michel Vorm	2	0	0	0	0	0	1+1	0	3+1	0
22	GK	(Argentina) Paulo Gazzaniga	3	0	2	0	5	0	1	0	11	0
Defenders
2	DF	(England) Kieran Trippier	26+1	1	1	0	2	0	7+1	0	36+2	1
3	DF	(England) Danny Rose	20+6	0	0	0	2+1	0	6+2	0	28+9	0
4	DF	(Belgium) Toby Alderweireld	33+1	0	0	0	4	0	12	0	49+1	0
5	DF	(Belgium) Jan Vertonghen	22	1	1	0	1	0	10	1	34	2
6	DF	(Colombia) Davinson Sánchez	22+1	1	2	0	3+1	0	7+1	0	34+3	1
16	DF	(England) Kyle Walker-Peters	4+2	0	2	0	1	0	1	0	8+2	0
21	DF	(Argentina) Juan Foyth	10+2	1	2	0	1	0	1+1	0	14+3	1
24	DF	(Ivory Coast) Serge Aurier	6+2	0	1	2	3	0	5	0	15+2	2
33	DF	(Wales) Ben Davies	20+7	0	1	0	3	0	6+3	0	30+10	0
53	MF	(England) Timothy Eyoma	0	0	0+1	0	0	0	0	0	0+1	0
Midfielders
8	MF	(England) Harry Winks	17+9	1	0	0	5	0	8+2	0	30+11	1
11	MF	(Argentina) Erik Lamela	9+10	4	0+1	0	2+2	1	3+6	1	14+19	6
12	MF	(Kenya) Victor Wanyama	4+9	1	1	0	2	0	4+2	0	11+11	1
14	MF	(France) Georges-Kévin Nkoudou	0+1	0	1	0	0+1	0	0	0	1+2	0
15	MF	(England) Eric Dier	18+2	3	1	0	1	0	2+4	0	22+6	3
17	MF	(France) Moussa Sissoko	27+2	0	0	0	4+1	0	8+2	0	39+5	0
20	MF	(England) Dele Alli	22+3	5	1	0	4	2	8	0	35+3	7
23	MF	(Denmark) Christian Eriksen	30+5	8	0	0	4	0	11+1	2	45+6	10
27	MF	(Brazil) Lucas Moura	25+7	10	2	0	2+1	0	8+4	5	36+12	15
40	MF	(England) Luke Amos	0+1	0	0	0	0	0	0	0	0+1	0
47	MF	(England) George Marsh	0	0	0+1	0	0	0	0	0	0+1	0
52	MF	(England) Oliver Skipp	2+6	0	2	0	0+2	0	0	0	4+8	0
Forwards
7	FW	(South Korea) Son Heung-min	23+8	12	1	1	3+1	3	11+1	4	39+9	20
9	FW	(Netherlands) Vincent Janssen	0+3	0	0	0	0	0	0	0	0+3	0
10	FW	(England) Harry Kane	27+1	17	0+1	1	1+1	1	9	5	37+3	24
18	FW	(Spain) Fernando Llorente	6+14	1	2	3	2+2	2	1+8	2	11+24	8
50	FW	(England) Kazaiah Sterling	0+1	0	0	0	0	0	0	0	0+1	0
Players transferred out during the season
19	MF	(Belgium) Mousa Dembélé	7+3	0	0	0	0+1	0	2	0	9+4	0

=== Goal scorers ===
The list is sorted by shirt number when total goals are equal.

Rnk	Pos	No.	Player	Premier League	FA Cup	EFL Cup	Champions League	Total
1	ST	10	(England) Harry Kane	17	1	1	5	24
2	ST	7	(South Korea) Son Heung-min	12	1	3	4	20
3	MF	27	(Brazil) Lucas Moura	10	0	0	5	15
4	MF	23	(Denmark) Christian Eriksen	8	0	0	2	10
5	ST	18	(Spain) Fernando Llorente	1	3	2	2	8
6	MF	20	(England) Dele Alli	5	0	2	0	7
7	MF	11	(Argentina) Erik Lamela	4	0	1	1	6
8	MF	15	(England) Eric Dier	3	0	0	0	3
9	DF	5	(Belgium) Jan Vertonghen	1	0	0	1	2
9	DF	24	(Ivory Coast) Serge Aurier	0	2	0	0	2
11	DF	2	(England) Kieran Trippier	1	0	0	0	1
11	DF	6	(Colombia) Davinson Sánchez	1	0	0	0	1
11	MF	8	(England) Harry Winks	1	0	0	0	1
11	MF	12	(Kenya) Victor Wanyama	1	0	0	0	1
11	DF	21	(Argentina) Juan Foyth	1	0	0	0	1
TOTALS				66	7	9	20	102

Last updated: 12 May 2019.
Source: premierleague.com, UEFA.com

==== Hat-tricks ====
Player	Against	Competition	Minutes	Score after goals	Result	Date
(Spain) Fernando Llorente	(England) Tranmere Rovers	FA Cup	48', 71', 72'	0–2, 0–5, 0–6	0–7 (A)	4 January 2019
(Brazil) Lucas Moura	(England) Huddersfield Town	Premier League	27', 87', 90+3'	2–0, 3–0, 4–0	4–0 (H)	13 April 2019
(Brazil) Lucas Moura	(Netherlands) Ajax	Champions League	55', 59', 90+6'	2–1, 2–2, 2–3	2–3 (A)	8 May 2019

==== Own goals ====
Player	Against	Competition	Minute	Score after own goal	Result	Date
(Spain) Fernando Llorente	(England) Fulham	Premier League	17'	1–0	1–2 (A)	20 January 2019
(England) Kieran Trippier	(England) Chelsea	Premier League	84'	2–0	2–0 (A)	27 February 2019
(Belgium) Toby Alderweireld	(England) Liverpool	Premier League	90'	2–1	2–1 (A)	31 March 2019

=== Clean sheets ===
The list is sorted by shirt number when total clean sheets are equal.

Rnk	No.	Player	Premier League	FA Cup	EFL Cup	Champions League	Total
1	1	(France) Hugo Lloris	12	0	0	3	15
2	22	(Argentina) Paulo Gazzaniga	1	1	2	0	4

Last updated: 23 April 2019.
Source: premierleague.com, uefa.com
