= Kyle Walker-Peters =

English footballer (born 1997)

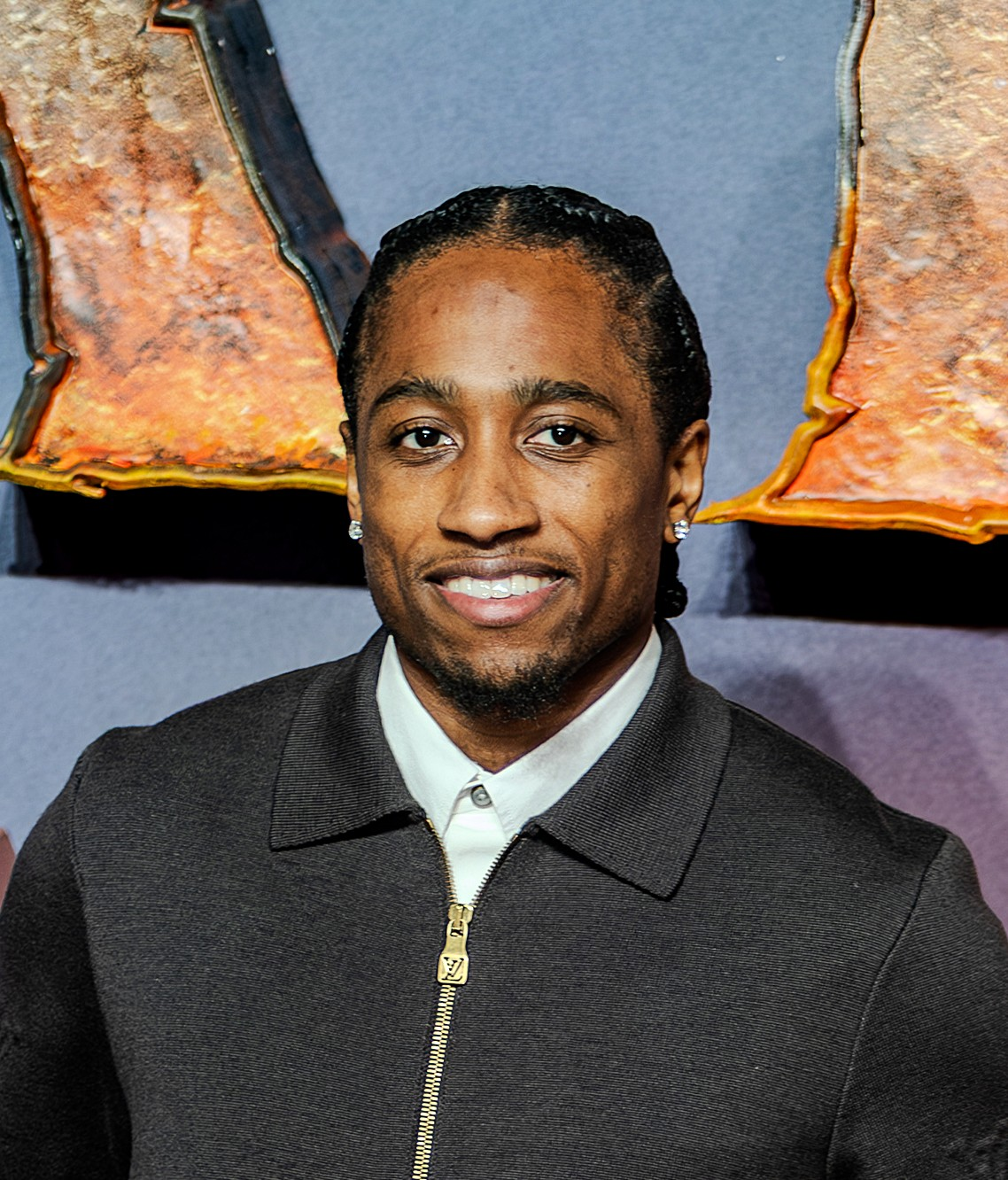
- Walker-Peters in 2025

Personal information
- Full name: Kyle Leonardus Walker-Peters
- Date of birth: 13 April 1997 (age 29)
- Place of birth: Edmonton, England
- Height: 5 ft 9 in (1.74 m)
- Position: Full-back

Team information
- Current team: West Ham United
- Number: 2

Youth career
- 2013–2015: Tottenham Hotspur

Senior career*
| Years | Team | Apps | (Gls) |
| 2015–2020 | Tottenham Hotspur | 12 | (0) |
| 2020 | → Southampton (loan) | 10 | (0) |
| 2020–2025 | Southampton | 169 | (4) |
| 2025– | West Ham United | 34 | (2) |

International career
| 2014–2015 | England U18 | 6 | (0) |
| 2015–2016 | England U19 | 12 | (0) |
| 2016–2017 | England U20 | 10 | (0) |
| 2017–2019 | England U21 | 9 | (0) |
| 2022 | England | 2 | (0) |
Medal record
Men's football
Representing England
FIFA U-20 World Cup
| Winner | 2017 |
- * Club domestic league appearances and goals as of 16:31, 31 October 2026 (UTC)

Kyle Leonardus Walker-Peters (born 13 April 1997) is an English professional footballer who plays as a full back for EFL Championship club West Ham United.

He started his career at Tottenham Hotspur, before joining Southampton in January 2020. After five seasons at Southampton, Walker-Peters moved to West Ham United in July 2025. He made two appearances for the England national team in 2022.

== Personal life ==
Walker-Peters was born in Edmonton, London. His uncle Phil Walker was a professional footballer who played for Millwall and Charlton Athletic.

== Club career ==
=== Tottenham Hotspur ===
Walker-Peters signed for Tottenham Hotspur on 1 July 2013. In May 2015, he made his senior team debut in the post-season tour of Malaysia and Australia. In December 2015, he received Premier League Under-21 player of the month for Spurs. February 2017 saw Walker-Peters sign a new contract until 2019.

At the start of the 2017–18 season Walker-Peters made his full Premier League debut against Newcastle United helping to earn Tottenham a 2–1 away victory at St James' Park. Sky Sports went on to award him Man of the Match. On 28 February 2018, he scored his first goal for Tottenham in the 6–1 win against Rochdale in the fifth round FA Cup tie.

In the 2018–19 season, Walker-Peters made his first start of the season on 31 October 2017 in the EFL Cup tie against West Ham United that Tottenham won 3–1. He also had his first appearance in the Premier League this season as a substitute in game against Leicester City.

On 10 December 2018, Walker-Peters signed a new five-year contract with Tottenham following a contract signed earlier in May the same year. He made his first start in the Champions League in the group stage against Barcelona, and despite a moment of poor play that led to a Barcelona goal, he performed well to block a goal in the second half. The match ended 1–1, which sent Tottenham through into the knockout stage together with their opponents.

On 26 December 2018, Walker-Peters registered three assists during a 5–0 home win against Bournemouth, becoming the youngest player, aged 21 years and 257 days, to provide three assists in a Premier League game since Jermaine Pennant (aged 20 years and 227 days) made three in August 2003 for Leeds United against Middlesbrough.

==== 2019–20 season: Loan to Southampton ====
On 29 January 2020, Walker-Peters joined fellow Premier League side Southampton on loan until the end of the season. He made his league debut on 15 February 2020 against Burnley which Southampton lost 2–1.

Due to the COVID-19 pandemic that suspended the Premier League season, Walker-Peters would not play again for Southampton until their 3–0 victory against Norwich City on 19 June 2020. Walker-Peters ended the season with ten appearances for Southampton.

=== Southampton ===
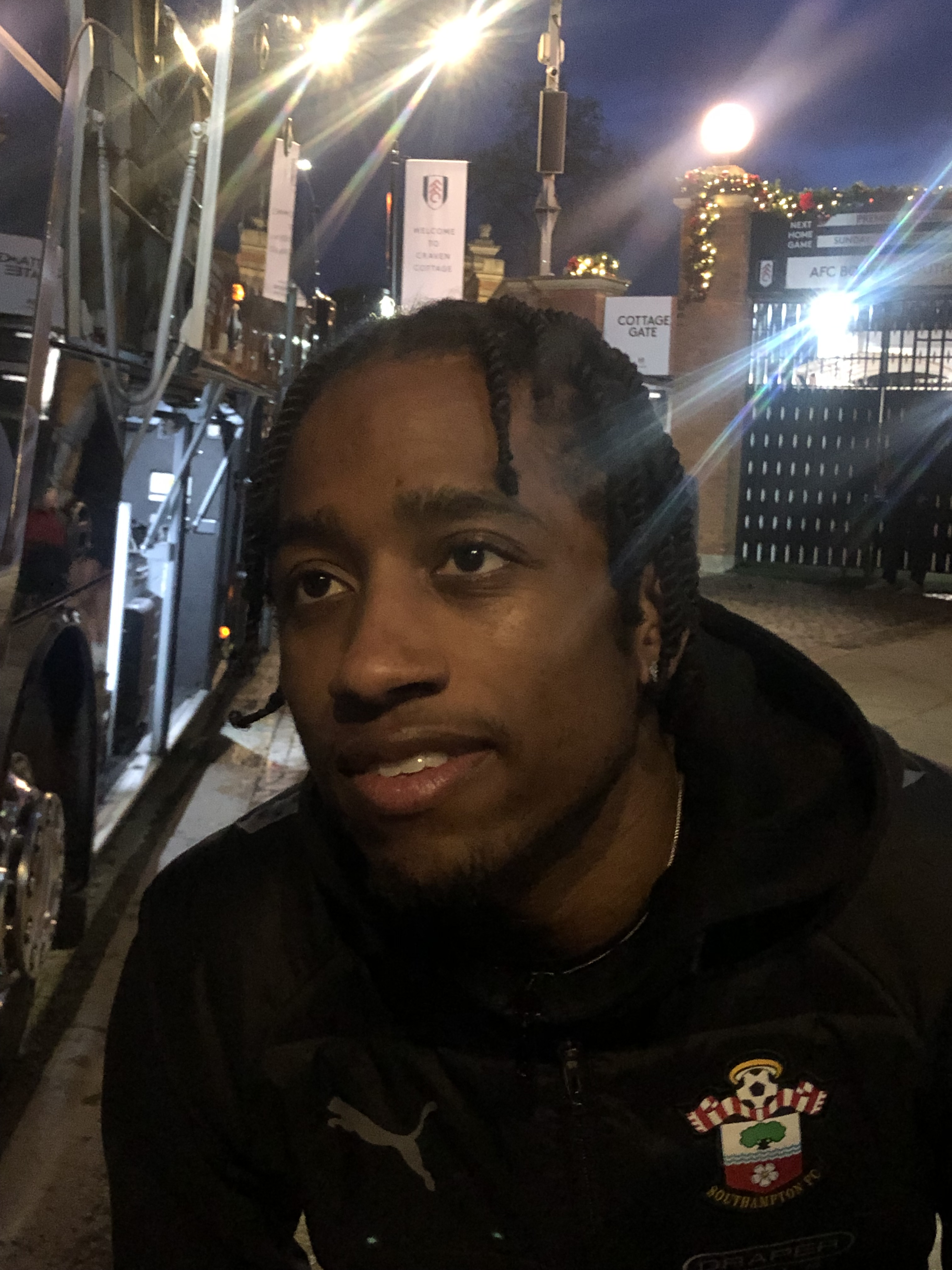
Walker-Peters pictured with a fan during his time at Southampton in 2024.

On 11 August 2020, he signed a permanent, five-year deal with the club for a reported fee of £12 million. On 12 September 2020, Walker-Peters started his first game since his permanent switch in a 1–0 defeat to Crystal Palace. He was initially shown a straight red card by referee Jon Moss, but after Moss reviewed the pitchside monitor the decision was downgraded to a yellow card. On 6 November 2020, he appeared in a 2–0 victory against Newcastle United which sent Southampton to the summit of the English top flight for the first time since 1988.

On 25 January 2021, Southampton manager Ralph Hasenhüttl said that Walker-Peters had sustained a muscle injury. On 11 February 2021, Walker-Peters returned from injury and started in the FA Cup against Wolverhampton Wanderers which ended in a 2–0 victory. He ended the season with 35 appearances in all competitions.

On 2 August 2021, Southampton signed right-back Tino Livramento for £5 million, adding competition for Walker-Peters. With the addition of Livramento, Walker-Peters starred as a left-back during parts of the season.

On 22 August 2021, he made his first appearance of the season in Southampton's 1–1 draw with Manchester United after he replaced Romain Perraud. On 25 August 2021, Walker-Peters scored his first professional goal for Southampton in an 8–0 away victory against Newport County in the EFL Cup. It was their biggest away win in their history.

On 22 January 2022, Walker-Peters scored his first Premier League goal in a 1–1 draw against Manchester City. On 5 February 2022, he scored the winning goal in a 2–1 victory against Coventry City in the FA Cup during extra time. Walker-Peters made 37 appearances in all competitions throughout the season. On 6 August 2022, he made his first appearance of the season in a 4–1 defeat to Tottenham Hotspur. A week later, Walker-Peters scored the equalising goal in a 2–2 draw with Leeds United.

On 13 March 2023, Southampton said it was in touch with Hampshire Police after Walker-Peters received racist abuse on social media following the team's goalless draw with Manchester United on 12 March. Southampton were relegated from the Premier League at the end of the season, with Walker-Peters making 38 appearances in all competitions.

On 4 August 2023, he made his first appearance of the season in a 2–1 away victory against Sheffield Wednesday. He scored his first goal of the campaign on 25 October 2023 in a 2–2 draw with Preston North End. During a 3–0 defeat to Liverpool in the FA Cup on 28 February 2024, Walker-Peters suffered an injury concern. Until his injury, he was the only outfield player who played every minute for the club in the league so far that season. Walker-Peters made 47 appearances in all competitions throughout the season. Walker-Peters made his first appearance of the season on 17 August 2024 in a 1–0 defeat against Newcastle United.

On 23 May 2025, interim Southampton manager Simon Rusk suggested that Walker-Peters had played his last game for the club, with the full-back struggling with an illness and out of contract in the summer. On 25 June 2025, Southampton confirmed that Walker-Peters would be released following the expiry of his contract.

=== West Ham United ===
On 20 July 2025, Walker-Peters signed a three-year deal with West Ham United on a free transfer. He made his debut for the club on 22 August in a 5–1 home defeat against Chelsea after he replaced Tomáš Souček in the 70th minute. On 8 November, Walker-Peters scored his first goal for the club in a 3–2 victory against Burnley.

== International career ==
Born in England, Walker-Peters is of Jamaican descent. He was selected to take part in the 2017 FIFA U-20 World Cup by coach Paul Simpson. He played in five matches and the final in which England won.

On 21 March 2022, Walker-Peters earned his first call-up to the senior England squad for friendlies against Switzerland and the Ivory Coast. Five days later, he made his senior debut in a 2–1 victory against Switzerland.

== Career statistics ==
=== Club ===
As of match played 31 October 2026

Appearances and goals by club, season and competition
| Club | Season | League | | | FA Cup | | EFL Cup | | Other | | Total | |
| Club | Season | Division | Apps | Goals | Apps | Goals | Apps | Goals | Apps | Goals | Apps | Goals |
|---|---|---|---|---|---|---|---|---|---|---|---|---|
| Tottenham Hotspur | 2017–18 | Premier League | 3 | 0 | 4 | 1 | 1 | 0 | 1 (Note: Appearance in UEFA Champions League) | 0 | 9 | 1 |
| Tottenham Hotspur | 2018–19 | Premier League | 6 | 0 | 2 | 0 | 1 | 0 | 1 | 0 | 10 | 0 |
| Tottenham Hotspur | 2019–20 | Premier League | 3 | 0 | 0 | 0 | 1 | 0 | 1 | 0 | 5 | 0 |
| Tottenham Hotspur | Total | | 12 | 0 | 6 | 1 | 3 | 0 | 3 | 0 | 24 | 1 |
| Southampton (loan) | 2019–20 | Premier League | 10 | 0 | 0 | 0 | — | | — | | 10 | 0 |
| Southampton | 2020–21 | Premier League | 30 | 0 | 4 | 0 | 1 | 0 | — | | 35 | 0 |
| Southampton | 2021–22 | Premier League | 32 | 1 | 3 | 1 | 2 | 1 | — | | 37 | 3 |
| Southampton | 2022–23 | Premier League | 31 | 1 | 3 | 0 | 4 | 0 | — | | 38 | 1 |
| Southampton | 2023–24 | Championship | 43 | 2 | 1 | 0 | 0 | 0 | 3 (Note: Appearances in Championship play-offs) | 0 | 47 | 2 |
| Southampton | 2024–25 | Premier League | 33 | 0 | 2 | 0 | 0 | 0 | — | | 35 | 0 |
| Southampton | Total | | 169 | 4 | 13 | 1 | 7 | 1 | 3 | 0 | 192 | 6 |
| West Ham United | 2025–26 | Premier League | 23 | 1 | 4 | 0 | 1 | 0 | — | | 28 | 1 |
| West Ham United | 2026–27 | Championship | 11 | 1 | 0 | 0 | 2 | 0 | — | | 13 | 1 |
| West Ham United | Total | | 34 | 2 | 4 | 0 | 3 | 0 | — | | 41 | 2 |
| Career total | | | 215 | 6 | 23 | 2 | 13 | 1 | 6 | 0 | 257 | 9 |

=== International ===
As of match played 29 March 2022

Appearances and goals by national team and year
| National team | Year | Apps | Goals |
|---|---|---|---|
| England | 2022 | 2 | 0 |
| Total | | 2 | 0 |

== Honours ==
Tottenham Hotspur

- UEFA Champions League runner-up: 2018–19

Southampton

- EFL Championship play-offs: 2024

England U20

- FIFA U-20 World Cup: 2017

Individual

- EFL Championship Team of the Season: 2023–24
- PFA Team of the Year: 2023–24 Championship
- The Athletic Championship Team of the Season: 2023–24
