= Eric Dier =

English footballer (born 1994)

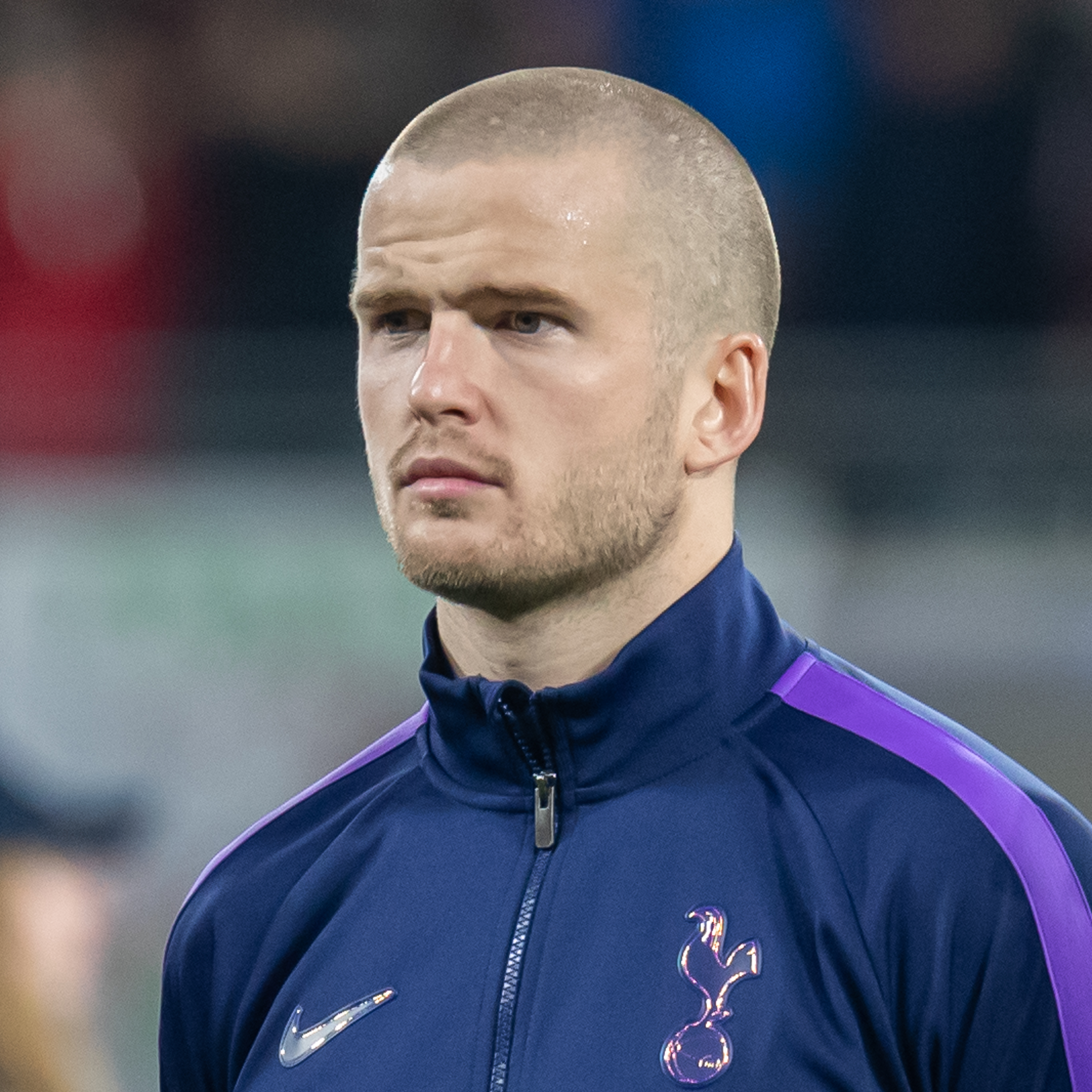
- Dier with Tottenham Hotspur in 2020

Personal information
- Full name: Eric Jeremy Edgar Dier
- Date of birth: 15 January 1994 (age 32)
- Place of birth: Cheltenham, England
- Height: 6 ft 3 in (1.91 m)
- Positions: Centre-back; defensive midfielder

Team information
- Current team: Monaco
- Number: 15

Youth career
- 2003–2012: Sporting CP
- 2010–2012: → Everton (loan)

Senior career*
| Years | Team | Apps | (Gls) |
| 2012–2014 | Sporting CP B | 16 | (2) |
| 2012–2014 | Sporting CP | 27 | (1) |
| 2014–2024 | Tottenham Hotspur | 274 | (12) |
| 2024 | → Bayern Munich (loan) | 15 | (0) |
| 2024–2025 | Bayern Munich | 21 | (2) |
| 2025– | Monaco | 18 | (2) |

International career
| 2011 | England U18 | 1 | (0) |
| 2012–2013 | England U19 | 8 | (0) |
| 2013–2014 | England U20 | 6 | (0) |
| 2013–2015 | England U21 | 9 | (0) |
| 2015–2022 | England | 49 | (3) |
Medal record
Men's football
Representing England
UEFA Nations League
| Third place | 2019 Portugal |
- * Club domestic league appearances and goals as of 22:45, 21 November 2026 (UTC)

Eric Jeremy Edgar Dier (born 15 January 1994) is an English professional footballer who plays as a centre-back for Ligue 1 club Monaco.

Dier grew up in Portugal, where he came through the youth ranks at Sporting CP, making his reserve and senior debuts in 2012. In 2014, he moved to English club Tottenham Hotspur for a fee of £4 million, going on to score 13 goals and total 365 appearances for the club, including in the 2015 Football League Cup final and the 2019 UEFA Champions League final. After ten years with Tottenham, he moved to Bayern Munich in January 2024, winning the Bundesliga in the 2024–25 season with the club. At the beginning of the following season, he joined Monégasque side AS Monaco.

Despite interest from Portugal, Dier opted to represent England in international football. He made his debut for the senior team in November 2015, and was chosen for UEFA Euro 2016 and the 2018 and 2022 FIFA World Cups.

== Early life ==
Dier was born in Cheltenham, Gloucestershire to Jeremy and Louise Dier. His father is a former professional tennis player. Dier is the grandson of Ted Croker, a former secretary of The Football Association (FA) and president of Cheltenham Town, and great-nephew of Peter Croker, who both played professionally for Charlton Athletic.

Dier moved to Portugal from England in 2001 with his parents and five siblings (two sisters and three brothers) when he was seven years old. They spent a year living in Lagos, Algarve region, where he briefly played in the youth football team of Esperança de Lagos, before moving to Lisbon. After the move, his mother was offered a job running the hospitality programme at UEFA Euro 2004. Dier was accepted by Sporting CP's youth academy, and in 2010, his parents returned to England while Dier remained in Portugal, living at Sporting CP's Academia Sporting in Alcochete.

== Club career ==
=== Early career ===
While playing football at the International Preparatory School in Lisbon, Dier's footballing ability was spotted by his P.E. teacher Miguel Silva, who referred him to Sporting CP for a trial at the age of eight. Dier signed professional terms with Sporting CP in April 2010. The Portuguese club beat Arsenal, Manchester United and Tottenham Hotspur to his signature. Sporting CP also sold 50% economic rights of the player to a third-party owner, Quality Football Ireland Limited.

In January 2011, Dier agreed to join Everton on loan until 30 June. Sporting CP's official website stated that the loan was "an opportunity for the athlete to grow in a more competitive and demanding environment". Dier represented Everton U18s ten times during his loan spell and won the 2010–11 U18 Premier League with the team. Dier encountered difficulties settling in Liverpool, but in the summer of 2011, he extended his loan stay in the Everton academy for an additional 12 months.

=== Breakthrough at Sporting ===
On 26 August 2012, Dier made his debut with Sporting B in a 2012–13 Segunda Liga 3–1 away win against Atlético, replacing Diego Rubio in the 77th minute. On 4 November 2012, Dier scored his first senior goal with a direct free kick against Benfica B in a 3–1 away win in the Segunda Liga.

On 11 November 2012, Dier was called to play for the first team in a Primeira Liga 1–0 home win against Braga. Fifteen days later, he scored his first goal for Sporting CP's first squad in a 2–2 league away draw against Moreirense.

=== Tottenham Hotspur ===
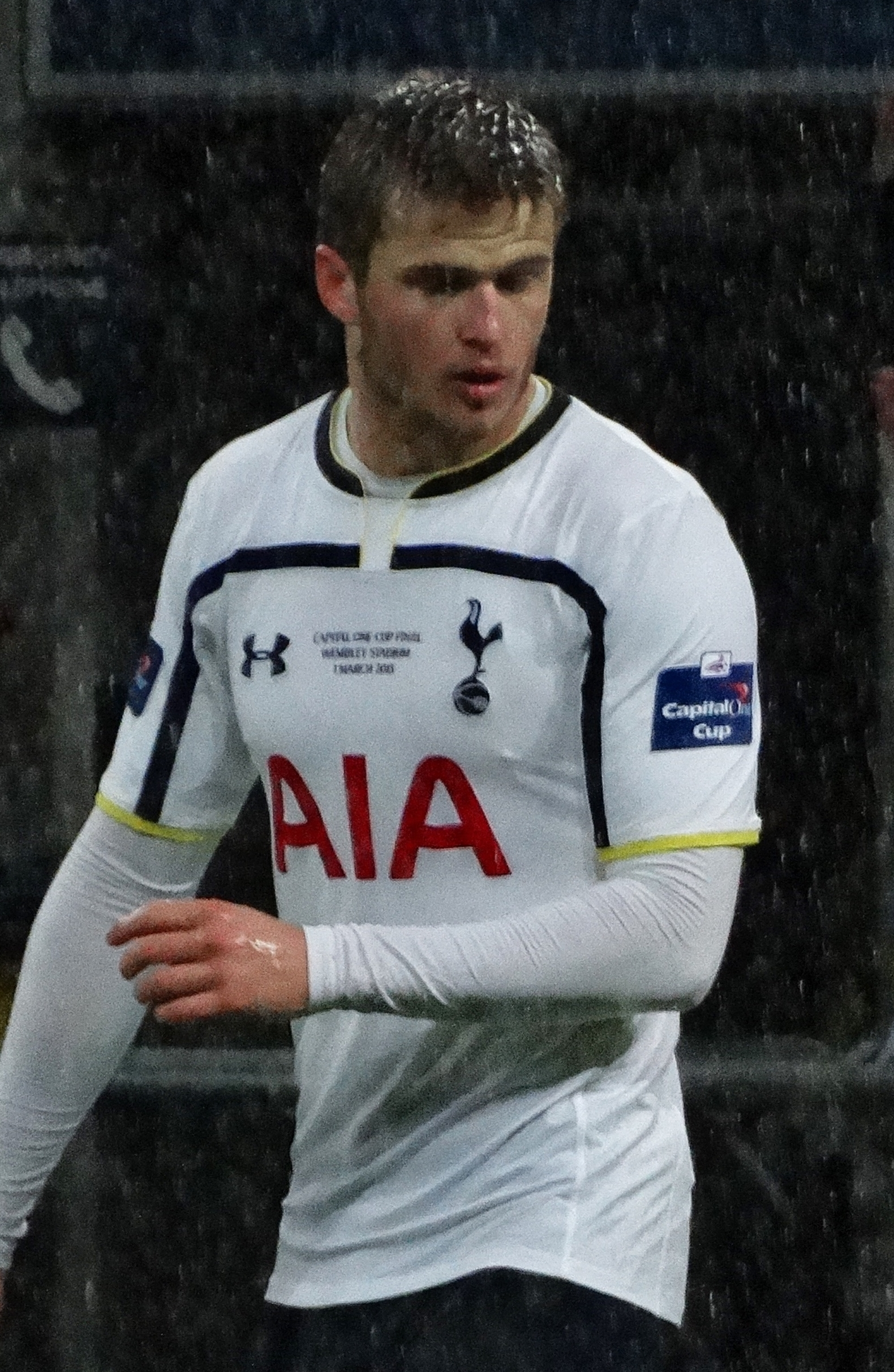
Dier playing for Tottenham Hotspur in the 2015 League Cup Final

On 2 August 2014, Dier signed a five-year contract with Tottenham Hotspur in a £4 million transfer. He made his competitive debut for the club on the first day of the 2014–15 Premier League season away to West Ham United on 16 August, and scored the only goal of the match in added time. Eight days later, in his second match and in his White Hart Lane debut, he headed in a corner from Erik Lamela in an eventual 4–0 win over newly promoted Queens Park Rangers. Dier started on 1 March 2015 as Tottenham lost the 2015 League Cup Final to Chelsea at Wembley.

Dier signed a new contract on 9 September 2015, lasting until 2020. During the 2015–16 season, he was utilised as a defensive midfielder by Tottenham head coach Mauricio Pochettino, establishing himself as the regular partner to Mousa Dembélé as Tottenham challenged eventual champions Leicester City for the Premier League title. On 15 August, he scored Tottenham's first goal of the Premier League season in a 2–2 draw at home to Stoke City, and on 26 September, Dier scored the team's equalising goal in a 4–1 home victory over Manchester City.

On 13 September 2016, Dier signed a new five-year contract to last until 2021. During the 2016–17 season, Dier returned to the centre-back position due to Tottenham's acquisition of defensive midfielder Victor Wanyama and injuries to defenders Toby Alderweireld and Jan Vertonghen. He made his UEFA Champions League debut in a 2–1 loss to Monaco in Tottenham's opening group match at Wembley Stadium. On 25 October 2016, Dier captained Tottenham for the first time in a 2–1 loss to Liverpool at Anfield in the fourth round of the EFL Cup. He was also given the captain's armband for the 3rd and 4th round FA Cup ties against Aston Villa and Wycombe Wanderers respectively. On 1 April 2017, Dier scored his first goal of 2016–17 in a 2–0 win over Burnley in the Premier League.

In the 2018–19 season, Dier scored his first goal of the season, which is his first in 18 months, in the 1–0 win against Cardiff City, helping Tottenham to their joint best start of a season in the Premier League after eight games. He underwent surgery mid-December 2018 due to appendicitis, and returned to the team on 20 January 2019, coming on as a substitute in the game against Fulham. However, he continued to suffer the after-effects of the appendicitis operation, repeatedly falling ill and missing games. On 1 June, in Tottenham's first appearance in the Champions League final, Dier replaced the injured Moussa Sissoko for the final 16 minutes of a 2–0 loss to Liverpool in Madrid.

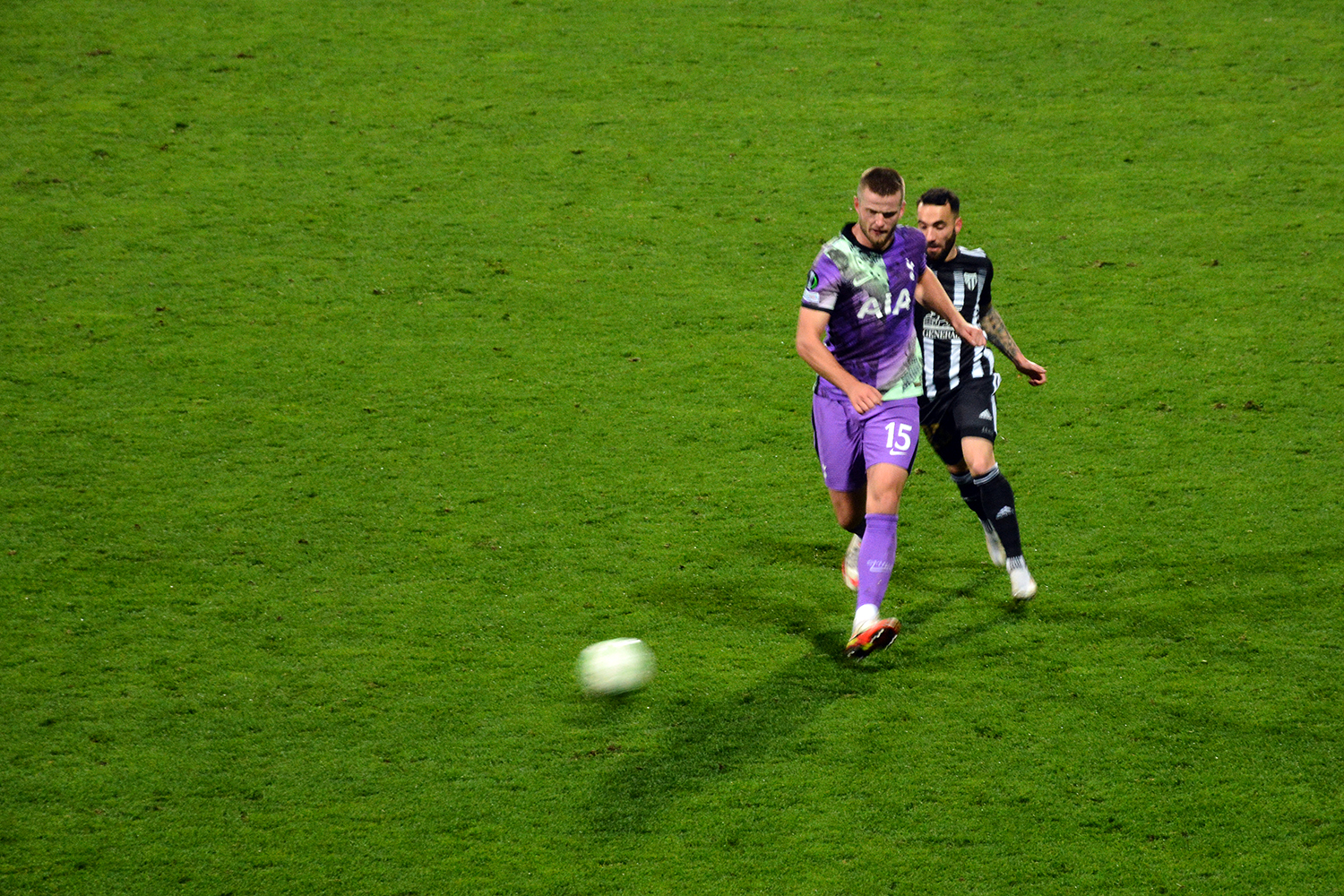
Dier holds off NŠ Mura's Mitja Lotrič in the maiden edition of the UEFA Europa Conference League, 2021

Dier had to undergo another procedure before the start of the 2019–20 season, and did not start his first game of the season until 24 September. This game, an EFL Cup game against lower-league Colchester United, ended poorly as they lost in a penalty shoot-out. He performed better in the Champions League game against Red Star Belgrade, helping the team to a 4–0 away win.

On 4 March 2020, Dier was involved in a confrontation with a spectator in the stands following Tottenham's FA Cup defeat by Norwich City. Dier climbed into the lower tier at the Tottenham Hotspur Stadium after the person "insulted" Dier and became involved in a dispute with Dier's brother Patrick who was also in the stand. The following day, the Metropolitan Police said they wished to interview Dier, his brother and the supporter alleged to be involved in the incident. On 23 April, Dier was charged by the FA with misconduct for a breach of FA Rule E3 due to his "improper and/or threatening" action. In July 2020, Dier was fined £40,000 and banned for four games.

On 21 July 2020, Dier signed an improved contract until June 2024.

=== Bayern Munich ===
On 11 January 2024, after a reduction in playing time under new Tottenham manager Ange Postecoglou, Dier was loaned to Bundesliga club Bayern Munich on a six-month loan contract that would expire at the same time as his Tottenham contract in June 2024. However, the loan contract included the option for a one-year permanent contract with Bayern Munich should he achieve the required minimum number of appearances. Hence, he reunited with his former teammate Harry Kane who had joined the club the previous summer. He made his debut for Bayern Munich on 24 January 2024 in a 1–0 win against Union Berlin. On 1 March 2024, having made the requisite number of appearances to satisfy the clause in his loan contract, it was confirmed that Dier would permanently transfer to Bayern Munich at the conclusion of the season on an initial one-year deal.

In the latter stages of the season, Dier formed a solid defensive partnership with Matthijs de Ligt under coach Thomas Tuchel, playing a crucial role in the club's progress in the Champions League. On 16 April 2025, he scored his first goal for the club in a 2–2 away draw against Inter Milan in the second leg of the UEFA Champions League quarter-finals. Ten days later, he scored his first Bundesliga goal in a 3–0 win against 1. FSV Mainz 05. On 10 May, Dier celebrated his first major career title as Bayern Munich clinched the Bundesliga championship with a 2–0 victory over Borussia Mönchengladbach.

=== Monaco ===
On 14 May 2025, Ligue 1 club Monaco announced the signing of Dier on a free transfer and a three-year deal, starting from 1 July. Later that year, on 16 August, he made his debut, scoring a goal in a 3–1 victory over Le Havre. On 1 October, in the league phase match against Manchester City in the 2025–26 UEFA Champions League, Dier earned a penalty which he converted from the spot in the final minute to draw the game 2–2.

== International career ==
=== Youth ===
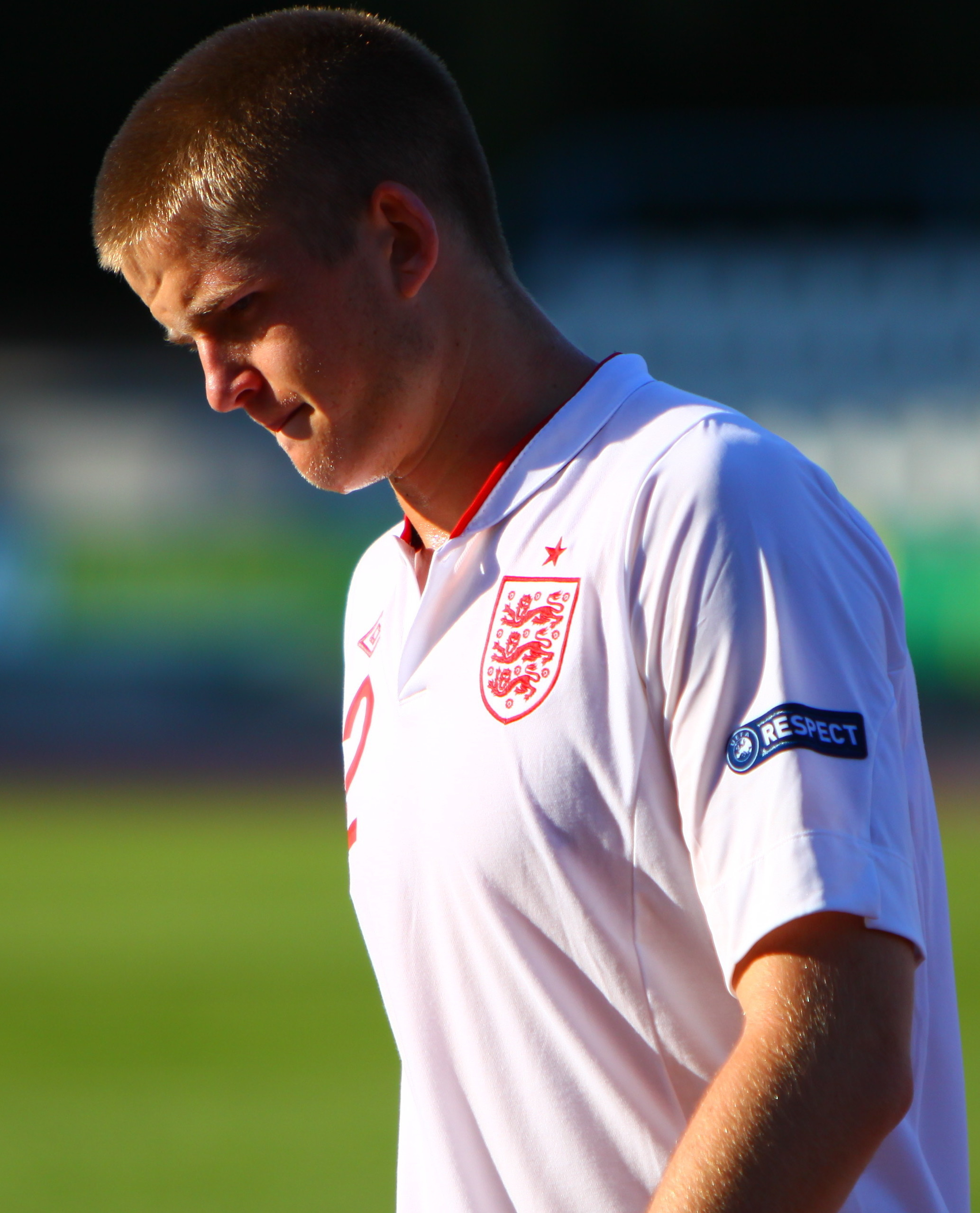
Dier playing for England U19s in 2012

Dier had been approached by the Portuguese Football Federation to play for Portugal in the future, but could only do so once he turned 18. He had been involved in a high-profile England national team kit promotion for sportswear manufacturers Umbro. Upon his signing for Everton, an FA spokesman said, "Our intention will be to select him for the youth squad in the coming weeks," referring to the 2011 edition of the under-17 international Algarve Tournament.

Dier earned his first England call-up in November 2011 when under-18 head coach Noel Blake picked him for a match against Slovakia. He played the full 90 minutes in the 1–1 draw on 16 November 2011.

On 28 May 2013, he was named in manager Peter Taylor's 21-man squad for the 2013 FIFA U-20 World Cup. He made his debut on 16 June in a 3–0 win in a warm-up match against Uruguay.

Dier made his debut for the England under-21s on 13 August 2013 in a 6–0 win against Scotland. In 2014, he pulled out of the squad, informing manager Gareth Southgate that he did not want to be deployed as a right-back anymore and would rather work on the centre-back position at his club, Tottenham.

=== Senior ===
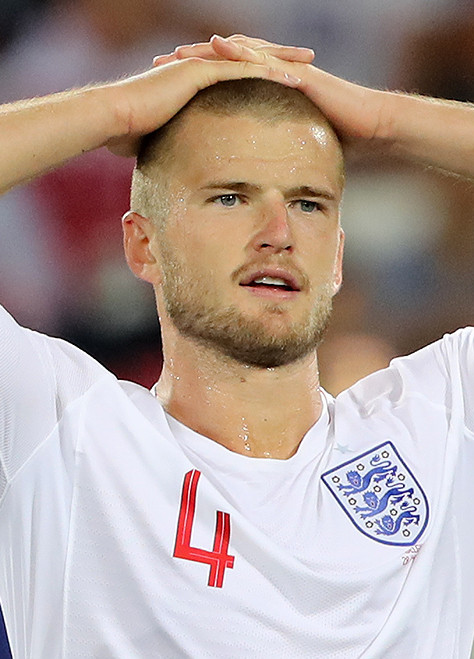
Dier playing for England at the 2018 FIFA World Cup

On 5 November 2015, Dier was selected for the first time to the England senior team by manager Roy Hodgson ahead of friendlies against Spain and France. He made his debut eight days later against the former at Alicante's Estadio José Rico Pérez as a 63rd-minute substitute alongside his Tottenham teammate Dele Alli in a 2–0 loss. Dier made his first start on 17 November against France, a 2–0 win at Wembley. On 26 March 2016, he scored his first international goal, heading Jordan Henderson's corner for the winner in a 3–2 victory against Germany in Berlin.

Dier was chosen for UEFA Euro 2016 in France. In England's opening match against Russia at the Stade Vélodrome, he opened the scoring in the 1–1 draw through a direct free-kick.

On 10 November 2017, Dier captained the England team for the first time in a friendly match against Germany at Wembley that ended in a goalless draw.

He was named in the 23-man England national team squad for the 2018 FIFA World Cup, and captained the squad in the final group stage match against Belgium. Dier scored the decisive penalty in the second round match against Colombia, giving England its first ever World Cup shootout victory and first competitive shootout victory since Euro 1996.

In September 2022, Dier received his first England call-up in 18 months for the UEFA Nations League matches against Italy and Germany. He started in the 1–0 defeat to Italy at the San Siro. A month later, he was included in the 26-man squad for the 2022 FIFA World Cup in Qatar. He made two substitute appearances at the tournament, in the group stage defeat of Iran and the Round of 16 defeat of Senegal, his last time playing for his country. He was an unused substitute for England's victories over Italy and Ukraine in the UEFA Euro 2024 qualifying rounds and was not included in the tournament squad.

== Style of play ==
Dier can play as a midfielder, centre-back and right-back. It has been noted that his versatility enabled Tottenham's effective adoption of a flexible approach, allowing them to switch systems efficiently within a single match. Dier has said that he has mixed Portuguese and English footballing styles on his own. In 2018, ESPN's Mark Ogden described Dier as "more of a destroyer than a creator".

== Personal life ==
Besides his British nationality, Dier also has Portuguese citizenship and therefore is a citizen of the European Union. In 2023, he married his girlfriend Anna Modler, a South African model who modeled for Boden clothing. Their daughter was born in January 2024.

Dier speaks fluent Portuguese. He also speaks some French.

== Career statistics ==
=== Club ===
As of match played 21 November 2026

Appearances and goals by club, season and competition
| Club | Season | League | | | National cup (Note: Includes FA Cup, DFB-Pokal, Coupe de France) | | League cup (Note: Includes Taça da Liga, Football League/EFL Cup) | | Europe | | Total | |
| Club | Season | Division | Apps | Goals | Apps | Goals | Apps | Goals | Apps | Goals | Apps | Goals |
|---|---|---|---|---|---|---|---|---|---|---|---|---|
| Sporting CP B | 2012–13 | Segunda Liga | 7 | 2 | — | | — | | — | | 7 | 2 |
| Sporting CP B | 2013–14 | Segunda Liga | 9 | 0 | — | | — | | — | | 9 | 0 |
| Sporting CP B | Total | | 16 | 2 | — | | — | | — | | 16 | 2 |
| Sporting CP | 2012–13 | Primeira Liga | 14 | 1 | 0 | 0 | 1 | 0 | 0 | 0 | 15 | 1 |
| Sporting CP | 2013–14 | Primeira Liga | 13 | 0 | 0 | 0 | 3 | 0 | — | | 16 | 0 |
| Sporting CP | Total | | 27 | 1 | 0 | 0 | 4 | 0 | 0 | 0 | 31 | 1 |
| Tottenham Hotspur | 2014–15 | Premier League | 28 | 2 | 1 | 0 | 3 | 0 | 4 (Note: Appearances in UEFA Europa League) | 0 | 36 | 2 |
| Tottenham Hotspur | 2015–16 | Premier League | 37 | 3 | 4 | 1 | 1 | 0 | 9 | 0 | 51 | 4 |
| Tottenham Hotspur | 2016–17 | Premier League | 36 | 2 | 4 | 0 | 1 | 0 | 7 (Note: Five appearances in UEFA Champions League, two appearances in UEFA Europa League) | 0 | 48 | 2 |
| Tottenham Hotspur | 2017–18 | Premier League | 34 | 0 | 4 | 0 | 2 | 0 | 7 (Note: Appearances in UEFA Champions League) | 0 | 47 | 0 |
| Tottenham Hotspur | 2018–19 | Premier League | 20 | 3 | 1 | 0 | 1 | 0 | 6 | 0 | 28 | 3 |
| Tottenham Hotspur | 2019–20 | Premier League | 19 | 0 | 5 | 0 | 1 | 0 | 5 | 0 | 30 | 0 |
| Tottenham Hotspur | 2020–21 | Premier League | 28 | 0 | 0 | 0 | 4 | 0 | 7 | 0 | 39 | 0 |
| Tottenham Hotspur | 2021–22 | Premier League | 35 | 0 | 1 | 0 | 1 | 0 | 3 (Note: Appearances in UEFA (Europa) Conference League) | 0 | 40 | 0 |
| Tottenham Hotspur | 2022–23 | Premier League | 33 | 2 | 1 | 0 | 1 | 0 | 7 | 0 | 42 | 2 |
| Tottenham Hotspur | 2023–24 | Premier League | 4 | 0 | 0 | 0 | 0 | 0 | — | | 4 | 0 |
| Tottenham Hotspur | Total | | 274 | 12 | 21 | 1 | 15 | 0 | 55 | 0 | 365 | 13 |
| Bayern Munich (loan) | 2023–24 | Bundesliga | 15 | 0 | — | | — | | 5 | 0 | 20 | 0 |
| Bayern Munich | 2024–25 | Bundesliga | 21 | 2 | 1 | 0 | — | | 6 | 1 | 28 | 3 |
| Bayern Munich | Bayern total | | 36 | 2 | 1 | 0 | — | | 11 | 1 | 48 | 3 |
| Monaco | 2025–26 | Ligue 1 | 9 | 1 | 1 | 0 | — | | 3 | 1 | 13 | 2 |
| Monaco | 2026–27 | Ligue 1 | 9 | 1 | 0 | 0 | — | | 3 | 0 | 12 | 1 |
| Monaco | Total | | 18 | 2 | 1 | 0 | — | | 6 | 1 | 25 | 3 |
| Career total | | | 371 | 19 | 23 | 1 | 19 | 0 | 72 | 2 | 485 | 22 |

=== International ===
As of match played 4 December 2022

Appearances and goals by national team and year
| National team | Year | Apps | Goals |
|---|---|---|---|
| England | 2015 | 2 | 0 |
| England | 2016 | 13 | 2 |
| England | 2017 | 8 | 1 |
| England | 2018 | 15 | 0 |
| England | 2019 | 2 | 0 |
| England | 2020 | 5 | 0 |
| England | 2022 | 4 | 0 |
| Total | | 49 | 3 |

As of match played 4 December 2022
England score listed first, score column indicates score after each Dier goal

List of international goals scored by Eric Dier
| No. | Date | Venue | Cap | Opponent | Score | Result | Competition | Ref. |
|---|---|---|---|---|---|---|---|---|
| 1 | 26 March 2016 | Olympiastadion, Berlin, Germany | 3 | Germany | 3–2 | 3–2 | Friendly | |
| 2 | 11 June 2016 | Stade Vélodrome, Marseille, France | 8 | Russia | 1–0 | 1–1 | UEFA Euro 2016 | |
| 3 | 4 September 2017 | Wembley Stadium, London, England | 20 | Slovakia | 1–1 | 2–1 | 2018 FIFA World Cup qualification | |

== Honours ==
Tottenham Hotspur

- Football League/EFL Cup runner-up: 2014–15, 2020–21
- UEFA Champions League runner-up: 2018–19

Bayern Munich

- Bundesliga: 2024–25

England

- UEFA Nations League third place: 2018–19
