= Mateus Fernandes (footballer) =

Portuguese footballer (born 2004)

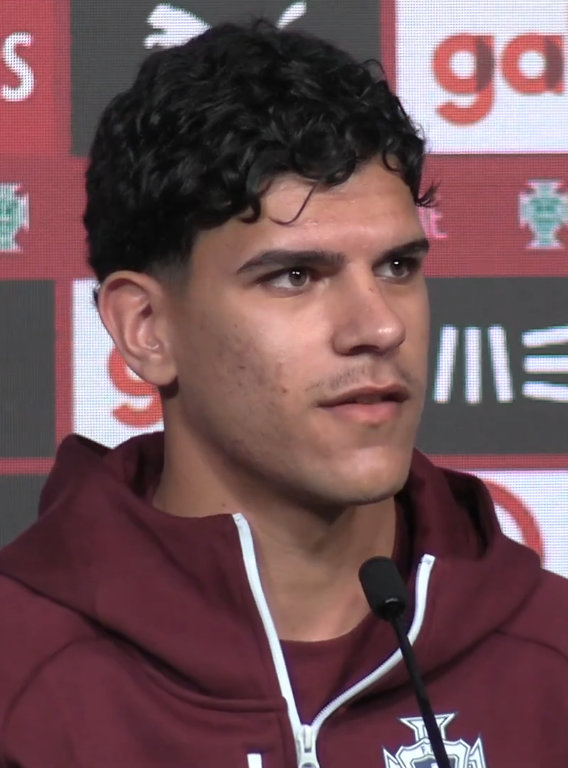
- Fernandes with Portugal in 2026

Personal information
- Full name: Mateus Gonçalo Espanha Fernandes
- Date of birth: 10 July 2004 (age 22)
- Place of birth: Olhão, Portugal
- Height: 1.78 m (5 ft 10 in)
- Position: Midfielder

Team information
- Current team: Tottenham Hotspur
- Number: 18

Youth career
- 2010–2016: Olhanense
- 2016–2021: Sporting CP

Senior career*
Years	Team	Apps	(Gls)
2021–2023	Sporting CP B	36	(2)
2022–2024	Sporting CP	5	(0)
2023–2024	→ Estoril (loan)	28	(1)
2024–2025	Southampton	39	(2)
2025–2026	West Ham United	36	(3)
2026–	Tottenham Hotspur	10	(0)

International career^{‡}
2021–2022	Portugal U18	9	(1)
2021–2023	Portugal U19	9	(0)
2022–2023	Portugal U20	2	(1)
2023–	Portugal U21	23	(4)
2026–	Portugal	1	(0)
- * Club domestic league appearances and goals as of 06:07, 13 November 2026 (UTC) ‡ National team caps and goals as of 23:25, 30 September 2026 (UTC)

Mateus Gonçalo Espanha Fernandes (born 10 July 2004) is a Portuguese professional footballer who plays as a midfielder for Premier League club Tottenham Hotspur and the Portugal national team.

Fernandes is a graduate of Sporting CP's youth system. He made 10 first-team appearances for Sporting, and had a spell on loan at Estoril, before joining Southampton in August 2024. He was signed by West Ham United in August 2025, for a transfer fee of more than £40 million. In July 2026, Fernandes joined Tottenham Hotspur.

Fernandes has made more than 40 appearances for Portugal at youth international level. He made his senior international debut in March 2026.

== Club career ==
=== Sporting CP ===
Fernandes is a youth product of his local club Olhanense, and moved to Sporting CP's youth academy in 2016. He was promoted to their B-team for the 2021–22 season. On 14 October 2022, Fernandes signed a professional contract with the club tying him until 2027 with a release clause of €60 million. He made his professional and senior debut with Sporting as a late substitute in a 3–1 Primeira Liga win over Casa Pia on 22 October 2022.

==== Loan to Estoril ====
On 29 August 2023, Primeira Liga club Estoril announced the signing of Fernandes on a season-long loan from Sporting.

=== Southampton ===
On 20 August 2024, Fernandes joined Southampton on a five-year contract. He made his debut for the club on 24 August 2024 in a 1–0 home defeat against Nottingham Forest after he replaced Taylor Harwood-Bellis in the 76th minute. On 28 August 2024, Fernandes scored his first goal for the club in a 5–3 away victory against Cardiff City in the EFL Cup.

=== West Ham United ===
On 29 August 2025, Fernandes joined Premier League club West Ham United on a five-year contract, for a transfer fee reported to be "more than £40m". He became the club's third-biggest signing, behind the £45 million paid for Sebastien Haller and the £51 million paid for Lucas Paquetá.

On 14 December 2025, Fernandes scored against Aston Villa after 29 seconds, making it the fastest Premier League goal of the season. The game ended 3–2 to Villa.

In May 2026, Fernandes was nominated for the Premier League Young Player of the Season award.

=== Tottenham Hotspur ===
On 2 July 2026, Fernandes joined Premier League club Tottenham Hotspur for a reported fee of £85 million.

He made his Spurs debut on 22 August, as a half-time substitute in a 3–0 Premier League defeat to Brentford. Fernandes gained his first start in the 5-1 win against Charlton Athletic in the EFL Cup, registering an assist. He also assisted in the next round 3 weeks later, in a 3-1 defeat against Liverpool.

On 24 October, Tottenham beat rivals Chelsea 2–0, their second win at Stamford Bridge in 36 years, Fernandes' corner was punched into his own net by Mike Penders to open the scoring 77 minutes in.

== International career ==
Fernandes has played youth international football for Portugal at under-18, under-19, under-20 and under-21 levels.

On 31 March 2026, Fernandes made his debut for the Portugal senior team, coming on as a late substitute for Bruno Fernandes in a friendly match in Atlanta against the United States, which ended 2–0 to Portugal.

== Style of play ==
Fernandes is a versatile, all-round midfielder who has operated in wide and advanced positions, but is primarily suited to a deeper central role. Although he was initially used as a number 10 at Southampton, he regards himself as a number 8, while West Ham United deployed him mainly in a hybrid role between a number 6 and number 8.

In possession, Fernandes is comfortable receiving the ball under pressure and can progress play through both passing and ball carrying. From deeper areas, he can drop between the central defenders to circulate possession, draw opponents into pressing and then break defensive lines or switch play with longer passes. Without the ball, he is noted for his tackling, tenacity and high-intensity running. His mobility and reading of danger allow him to cover ground, contest loose balls and help defend against transitions, while he also presses opponents in an attempt to force turnovers. He is also capable of making late runs into the penalty area, although goalscoring has been identified as an area in which he could further improve.

== Career statistics ==
=== Club ===
As of match played 7 November 2026

Appearances and goals by club, season and competition
Club	Season	League			National cup (Note: Includes Taça de Portugal, FA Cup)		League cup (Note: Includes Taça da Liga, EFL Cup)		Europe		Other		Total	
Club	Season	Division	Apps	Goals	Apps	Goals	Apps	Goals	Apps	Goals	Apps	Goals	Apps	Goals
Sporting CP B	2021–22	Liga 3	18	1	—		—		—		—		18	1
Sporting CP B	2022–23	Liga 3	18	1	—		—		—		—		18	1
Sporting CP B	Total		36	2	—		—		—		—		36	2
Sporting CP	2022–23	Primeira Liga	3	0	0	0	2	1	2 (Note: One appearance in UEFA Champions League, one appearance in UEFA Europa League)	0	—		7	1
Sporting CP	2023–24	Primeira Liga	1	0	—		—		—		—		1	0
Sporting CP	2024–25	Primeira Liga	1	0	—		—		—		1 (Note: Appearance in Supertaça Cândido de Oliveira)	0	2	0
Sporting CP	Total		5	0	0	0	2	1	2	0	1	0	10	1
Estoril (loan)	2023–24	Primeira Liga	28	1	3	0	4	0	—		—		35	1
Southampton	2024–25	Premier League	36	2	2	0	4	1	—		—		42	3
Southampton	2025–26	Championship	3	0	—		1	1	—		—		4	1
Southampton	Total		39	2	2	0	5	2	—		—		46	4
West Ham United	2025–26	Premier League	36	3	2	1	—		—		—		38	4
Tottenham Hotspur	2026–27	Premier League	10	0	0	0	2	0	—		—		12	0
Career total			154	8	7	1	13	3	2	0	1	0	177	12

=== International ===
As of match played 31 March 2026

Appearances and goals by national team and year
National team	Year	Apps	Goals
Portugal	2026	1	0
Total		1	0

== Honours ==
Individual

- Southampton Player of the Season: 2024–25
- West Ham United Hammer of the Year runner-up: 2025–26
- West Ham United Goal of the Season: 2025–26
