= All or Nothing (franchise) =

Prime Video documentary franchise

- Original work: All or Nothing: A Season with the Arizona Cardinals (2016)
- Owner: Amazon MGM Studios
- Years: 2016–2023

Films and television
- Television series: List: All or Nothing: A Season with the Arizona Cardinals (2016); All or Nothing: A Season with the Los Angeles Rams (2017); All or Nothing: The Dallas Cowboys (2018); All or Nothing: Manchester City (2018); All or Nothing: The Michigan Wolverines (2018); All or Nothing: New Zealand All Blacks (2018); All or Nothing: The Carolina Panthers (2019); All or Nothing: The Philadelphia Eagles (2020); All or Nothing: Brazil National Team (2020); All or Nothing: Tottenham Hotspur (2020); All or Nothing: Juventus (2021); All or Nothing: Toronto Maple Leafs (2021); All or Nothing: Arsenal (2022); All or Nothing: German National Team in Qatar (2023)

All or Nothing is a franchise of sports documentary series distributed on the Amazon Prime Video platform. Produced by Amazon MGM Studios, each series has covered a professional sports club or national team. Debuting in 2016 with All or Nothing: A Season with the Arizona Cardinals, the series films the operations, practices, and competitions of teams, players, and coaches.

== Series ==
=== American football ===
==== National Football League ====
- All or Nothing: A Season with the Arizona Cardinals (2016) – about the 2015 Arizona Cardinals season
- All or Nothing: A Season with the Los Angeles Rams (2017) – about the 2016 Los Angeles Rams season
- All or Nothing: The Dallas Cowboys (2018) – about the 2017 Dallas Cowboys season
- All or Nothing: The Carolina Panthers (2019) – about the 2018 Carolina Panthers season
- All or Nothing: The Philadelphia Eagles (2020) – about the 2019 Philadelphia Eagles season

==== College football ====
- All or Nothing: The Michigan Wolverines (2018) – about the 2017 Michigan Wolverines football team

=== Association football ===
==== National teams ====
- All or Nothing: Brazil National Team (2020) – about the Brazil national football team in 2019 Copa América
- All or Nothing: German National Team in Qatar (2023) – about the Germany national football team in 2022 FIFA World Cup

==== Premier League ====
- All or Nothing: Manchester City (2018) – about the 2017–18 Manchester City F.C. season
- All or Nothing: Tottenham Hotspur (2020) – about the 2019–20 Tottenham Hotspur F.C. season
- All or Nothing: Arsenal (2022) – about the 2021–22 Arsenal F.C. season
- All or Nothing: Manchester United (2027) – about the 2026–27 Manchester United F.C. season

==== Serie A ====
- All or Nothing: Juventus (2021) – about the 2020–21 Juventus FC season

=== Ice hockey ===
==== National Hockey League ====
- All or Nothing: Toronto Maple Leafs (2021) – about the 2020–21 Toronto Maple Leafs season

=== Rugby union ===
==== National teams ====
- All or Nothing: New Zealand All Blacks (2018) – about the New Zealand national rugby union team

== See also ==
- Hard Knocks (documentary series)
