= All or Nothing: Tottenham Hotspur =

Amazon Original sports docuseries

- Genre: Sports documentary
- Directed by: Anthony Philipson
- Narrated by: Tom Hardy
- No. of seasons: 1
- No. of episodes: 9

Production
- Executive producers: Mark Raphael; John Douglas
- Producer: Clare Cameron
- Production locations: Tottenham, England
- Running time: 45–59 minutes
- Production company: 72 Films

Original release
- Network: Amazon Prime Video
- Release: 31 August – 14 September 2020

All or Nothing: Tottenham Hotspur is a sports documentary series focusing on the 2019–20 season of the London football club Tottenham Hotspur. It chronicles a difficult season for the club, beginning with the sacking of Mauricio Pochettino as manager who was replaced by José Mourinho, and focuses on the attempt by Mourinho to guide the team in an ultimately unfulfilling season interrupted by the COVID-19 pandemic. It is part of the All or Nothing docuseries with the first three episodes released on 31 August 2020 on Amazon Prime, and further episodes released on 7 September and 14 September.

The series is narrated by Tom Hardy.

== Production ==
It was first announced in October 2019 that Tottenham Hotspur would become the subject of the Amazon Prime All or Nothing series. Eight episodes were initially scheduled, but an extra episode was later added so as to continue documenting the season following its resumption after the season was suspended due to the 2020 coronavirus pandemic.

The documentary production crew were given access to the club to provide a behind-the-scene look at the club. The goings-on at the club were captured by 25 remotely-operated fixed rig cameras and 66 ambient microphones installed at the Tottenham Hotspur Stadium and the club's training centre in Enfield. These were placed in the dressing room of the home team, the offices of all the key figures including the head coach, and other locations such the first team's restaurant. In places not covered by these fixed cameras, for example when the team were playing away, video footage was captured by a camera crew following the team. The access by the producer was sanctioned by club chairman Daniel Levy but the manager Pochettino expressed his concerns over the extra workload caused by the production. The series, however, covered little on Pochettino and his sacking, concentrating instead on his successor Mourinho.

Due to the lockdown rules and social distancing protocols imposed during the pandemic, editing of the series had to be done remotely, and the number of people working on the show had to be scaled back.

Goalkeeper Hugo Lloris felt that the production of the series contributed to tensions between the players and officials at the club. Lloris wrote that the decision to install cameras was made without the consent of the players and that despite the £10 million rumoured fee from Amazon to the club - the players would not receive compensation for being fitted with microphones. Lloris and other players had an agreement with the club that the training dressing room would not have microphones and it subsequently became the only place where players could "speak freely". The players would also deliberately sit at tables that did not have microphones. He felt that the series was a "constraint and it had consequences".

== Episodes ==
No. in series	Title	Original release date
1	"A New Signing"	31 August 2020
2	"A New Start"	31 August 2020
3	"No More Mr. Nice Guy"	31 August 2020
4	"Season's Greetings"	7 September 2020
5	"New Blood"	7 September 2020
6	"Running on Empty"	7 September 2020
7	"No Regrets"	14 September 2020
8	"Stop"	14 September 2020
9	"The Run In"	14 September 2020

== Reception ==
Critical reception to the series is mixed. Stuart Jeffries of The Guardian complained the documentary was "boringly sanitised"; that "while promising access to all areas, the makers of All or Nothing are like embedded war reporters. They are unreliable witnesses compromised by close association with the subject of the show and so they don’t get the real dirt or footage of proper meltdowns." It ignored the story from Pochettino's viewpoint; instead, PR footages of footballers were presented. Henry Mance of the Financial Times offered the opinion that the series "is a lot of hype, little delivery", and amounts to nothing more than "a first draft of hagiography" that is "not compulsive viewing". Michael Hogan of The Daily Telegraph similarly thought the series almost a "glorified puff piece", but saved from being so by the personality of Mourinho. He found Mourinho a "compelling viewing" and thought the series provided "fascinating insights into his working methods"; however, the viewers "never truly get to know the players" who "come out of it suspiciously well".

In contrast, Caroline Framke of Variety considered the series "revealing, dynamic television about a team reinventing itself amid more turmoil than it ever saw coming". She wrote that the "tightly edited series is smart about how it presents what's at stake and the interpersonal dynamics at play" in a turbulent season, making it an improvement on the previous installment All or Nothing: Manchester City.
