= All or Nothing: Brazil National Team =

Amazon Original sports docuseries

- Genre: Sports documentary
- Directed by: Felipe Briso; Luiz Ferraz; Daniel Ramirez-Suarez
- Starring: Neymar; Alisson; Dani Alves
- No. of seasons: 1
- No. of episodes: 5

Production
- Production location: Brazil
- Running time: 43–54 minutes

Original release
- Network: Amazon Prime Video
- Release: 31 January 2020

All or Nothing: Brazil National Team is an Amazon Original docuseries as part of the All or Nothing brand. In the series, Brazil national football team's progress was charted through their winning campaign at the 2019 Copa América.

The show premiered on 31 January 2020.

== Episodes ==
No. in series	Title
1	"The Obligation to Win"
2	"A Team That Plays Together, Pray Together"
3	"Heroes and Villains"
4	"Clash of Rivals"
5	"Catharsis"
