= 2019–20 Tottenham Hotspur F.C. season =

English football club season

Tottenham Hotspur
2019–20 season
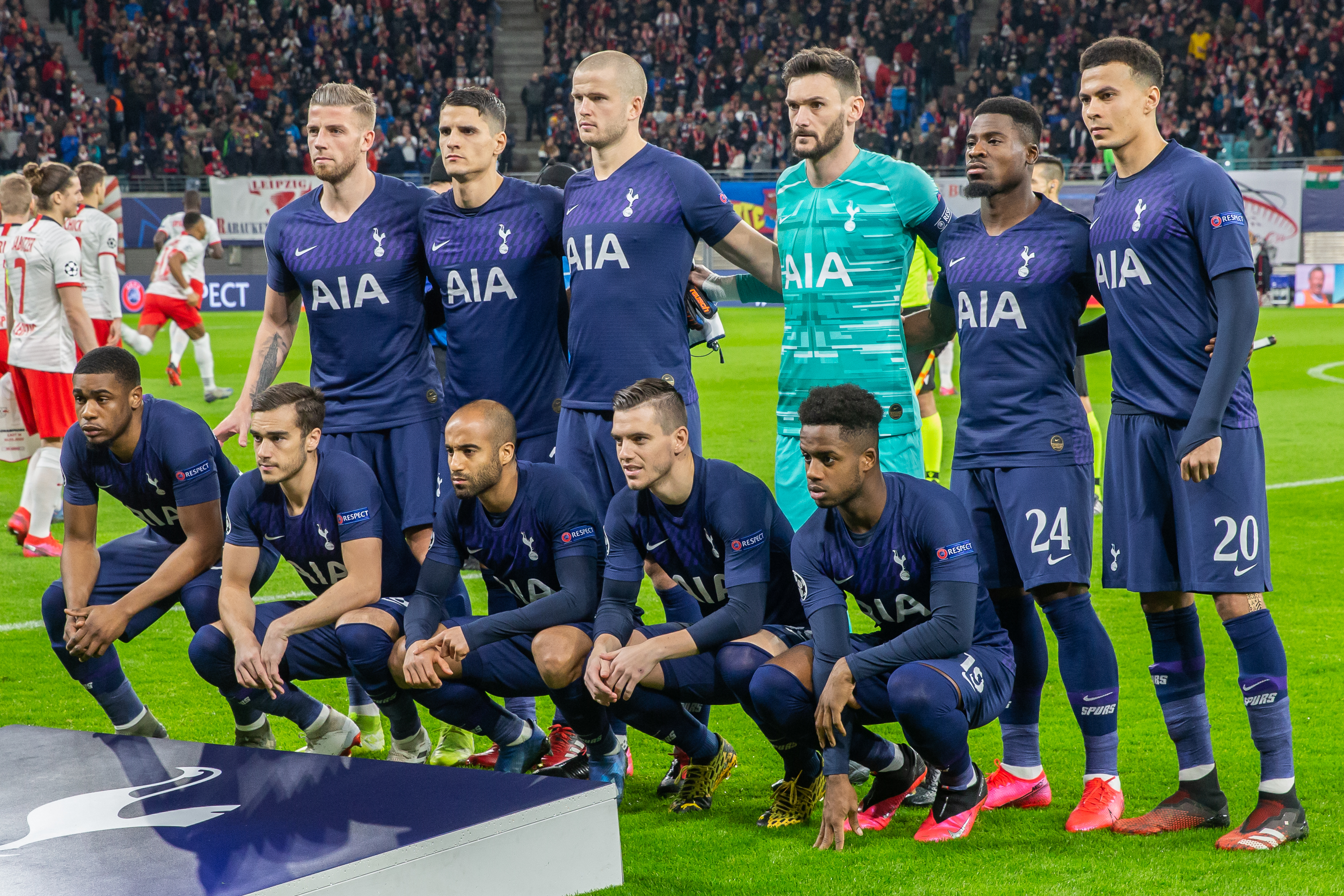
- Spurs players at the UEFA Champions League match against RB Leipzig in March 2020
- Owner: ENIC International Ltd.
- Chairman: Daniel Levy
- Manager: Mauricio Pochettino (until 19 November); José Mourinho (from 20 November)
- Stadium: Tottenham Hotspur Stadium
- Premier League: 6th
- FA Cup: Fifth round
- EFL Cup: Third round
- UEFA Champions League: Round of 16
- Top goalscorer: League: Harry Kane (18); All: Harry Kane (24)
- Highest home attendance: 61,104 (22 December vs. Chelsea, Premier League)
- Lowest home attendance: 51,743 (22 October vs. Red Star Belgrade, Champions League)
- Average home league attendance: 59,607
- Biggest win: 5–0 (22 October vs. Red Star Belgrade, Champions League); 5–0 (7 December vs. Burnley, Premier League)
- Biggest defeat: 2–7 (1 October vs. Bayern Munich, Champions League)
Home colours	Away colours	Third colours

The 2019–20 season was Tottenham Hotspur's 28th season in the Premier League and 42nd successive season in the top division of the English football league system. Along with the domestic league, the club competed in the FA Cup, the EFL Cup and the UEFA Champions League. This also marked the first full season of the Tottenham Hotspur Stadium, after playing the majority of the previous season at Wembley Stadium.

The season started poorly for Tottenham, with only three of their first 12 league games won, as well as being knocked out of the EFL Cup by Colchester United. This resulted in Mauricio Pochettino's sacking on 19 November 2019, to be replaced by José Mourinho the following day. In the FA Cup, Tottenham were taken to a replay twice, requiring four games to progress to the fifth round where they hosted Norwich City. The game went into extra time and with the result being 1–1, it came down to penalties. Norwich won the shootout 3–2 and knocked out Spurs.

With the onset of the COVID-19 pandemic, Premier League football matches were postponed in March, including Tottenham's games against Manchester United and West Ham. A further joint statement from the Premier League and UEFA extended postponement until 30 April. Later, the season's postponement was again extended, this time indefinitely. The season for Tottenham ultimately restarted on 19 June, when they hosted Manchester United in a 1–1 draw with Steven Bergwijn on the scoresheet.

The season saw Tottenham taking the least amount of shots since Opta began collecting data during the 1997–98 season. Several of these games were plagued by controversial VAR decisions, two of which were a handball called against Lucas Moura that resulted in Harry Kane's goal against Sheffield United being disallowed, as well as a penalty not given against Bournemouth in which Joshua King pushed Kane from behind in the box. The Premier League later confirmed that this was, in fact, the wrong decision.

The season was documented in the Amazon Prime Video series All or Nothing: Tottenham Hotspur.

== First-team squad ==
Squad no.	Name	Nationality	Position(s)	Date of birth (age)
Goalkeepers
1	Hugo Lloris (c)	(France)	GK	26 December 1986 (aged 33)
22	Paulo Gazzaniga	(Argentina)	GK	2 January 1992 (aged 28)
Defenders
3	Danny Rose	(England)	LB	2 July 1990 (aged 29)
4	Toby Alderweireld	(Belgium)	CB / RB	2 March 1989 (aged 31)
5	Jan Vertonghen (3rd C)	(Belgium)	CB / LB	24 April 1987 (aged 33)
6	Davinson Sánchez	(Colombia)	CB / RB	12 June 1996 (aged 24)
15	Eric Dier	(England)	DM / CB	15 January 1994 (aged 26)
21	Juan Foyth	(Argentina)	CB / RB / DM	12 January 1998 (aged 22)
24	Serge Aurier	(Ivory Coast)	RB / RWB	24 December 1992 (aged 27)
33	Ben Davies	(Wales)	LB / LWB / CB	24 April 1993 (aged 27)
Midfielders
8	Harry Winks	(England)	CM / DM	2 February 1996 (aged 24)
17	Moussa Sissoko	(France)	CM / RM	16 August 1989 (aged 30)
18	Giovani Lo Celso	(Argentina)	CM / AM	9 April 1996 (aged 24)
19	Ryan Sessegnon	(England)	LW / LWB	18 May 2000 (aged 20)
20	Dele Alli	(England)	CM / AM	11 April 1996 (aged 24)
28	Tanguy Ndombele	(France)	CM / DM	28 December 1996 (aged 23)
30	Gedson Fernandes	(Portugal)	CM	9 January 1999 (aged 21)
Forwards
7	Son Heung-min	(South Korea)	LW / FW / RW	8 July 1992 (aged 27)
10	Harry Kane (VC)	(England)	FW / SS	28 July 1993 (aged 26)
11	Erik Lamela	(Argentina)	RW / LW / AM	4 March 1992 (aged 28)
23	Steven Bergwijn	(Netherlands)	LW / RW	8 October 1997 (aged 22)
27	Lucas Moura	(Brazil)	RW / LW / SS	13 August 1992 (aged 27)

Last updated: 3 March 2020.
Source: Tottenham Hotspur F.C.

== Transfers ==
=== Released ===
Date from	Position	Nationality	Name	To	Notes	Ref.
7 June 2019	CM	(England)	Dylan Duncan	(England) Queens Park Rangers	Released	(Note: Following Duncan's release he signed to Queens Park Rangers.)
7 June 2019	GK	(England)	Charlie Freeman	Free agent	Released	
7 June 2019	GK	(Australia)	Tom Glover	(Australia) Melbourne City	Released	(Note: Following Glovers's release he signed to Melbourne City.)
7 June 2019	LB	(England)	Jamie Reynolds	Free agent	Released	(Note: Reynolds signed to Cheshunt in early-December 2019.)
7 June 2019	GK	(Netherlands)	Michel Vorm	Free agent	Released	(Note: Vorm re-signed to Tottenham Hotspur in mid-October 2019.)
30 June 2019	CF	(Spain)	Fernando Llorente	(Italy) Napoli	Out of Contract	(Note: Llorente signed to Napoli beginning of September 2019.)

=== Loans in ===
Date from	Position	Nationality	Name	From	Date until	Ref.
8 August 2019	CM	(Argentina)	Giovani Lo Celso	(Spain) Real Betis	28 January 2020	
15 January 2020	CM	(Portugal)	Gedson Fernandes	(Portugal) Benfica	30 June 2021	

=== Loans out ===
Date from	Position	Nationality	Name	To	Date until	Ref.
1 July 2019	DM	(England)	Luke Amos	(England) Queens Park Rangers	30 June 2020	
2 July 2019	RW	(England)	Jack Clarke	(England) Leeds United	27 December 2019	
8 August 2019	CB	(United States)	Cameron Carter-Vickers	(England) Stoke City	27 December 2019	
16 August 2019	CF	(England)	Kazaiah Sterling	(England) Doncaster Rovers	27 December 2019	
19 August 2019	LM	(Cyprus)	Anthony Georgiou	(England) Ipswich Town	28 December 2019	
19 August 2019	DM	(England)	George Marsh	(England) Leyton Orient	30 June 2020	
20 August 2019	CM	(Cyprus)	Jack Roles	(England) Cambridge United	30 June 2020	
16 January 2020	RW	(England)	Jack Clarke	(England) Queens Park Rangers	30 June 2020	
26 January 2020	CM	(England)	Armando Shashoua	(Spain) Atlético Baleares	30 June 2020	
27 January 2020	GK	(United States)	Brandon Austin	(Denmark) Viborg	30 June 2020	
29 January 2020	RB	(England)	Kyle Walker-Peters	(England) Southampton	30 June 2020	
30 January 2020	CB	(United States)	Cameron Carter-Vickers	(England) Luton Town	30 June 2020	
30 January 2020	CB	(England)	Timothy Eyoma	(England) Lincoln City	30 June 2020	
30 January 2020	LB	(England)	Danny Rose	(England) Newcastle United	30 June 2020	
31 January 2020	LM	(Cyprus)	Anthony Georgiou	(England) Bolton Wanderers	30 June 2020	
31 January 2020	CF	(England)	Kazaiah Sterling	(England) Leyton Orient	30 June 2020	
31 January 2020	RW	(England)	Shilow Tracey	(England) Macclesfield Town	30 June 2020	

=== Transfers in ===
Date from	Position	Nationality	Name	From	Fee	Ref.
1 July 2019	CF	(England)	Kion Etete	(England) Notts County	Undisclosed	
1 July 2019	GK	(Norway)	Isak Midttun Solberg	(Norway) Bryne	Undisclosed	
2 July 2019	RW	(England)	Jack Clarke	(England) Leeds United	£10,000,000	
2 July 2019	CM	(France)	Tanguy Ndombele	(France) Lyon	£55,000,000	
8 August 2019	LW	(England)	Ryan Sessegnon	(England) Fulham	£25,000,000	
14 October 2019	GK	(Netherlands)	Michel Vorm	Free agent	Free	
28 January 2020	CM	(Argentina)	Giovani Lo Celso	(Spain) Real Betis	Undisclosed	
29 January 2020	LW	(Netherlands)	Steven Bergwijn	(Netherlands) PSV Eindhoven	£27,000,000	

=== Transfers out ===
Date from	Position	Nationality	Name	To	Fee	Ref.
7 June 2019	LB	(England)	Connor Ogilvie	(England) Gillingham	Free	
17 July 2019	RB	(England)	Kieran Trippier	(Spain) Atlético Madrid	£20,000,000	
23 July 2019	FW	(Netherlands)	Vincent Janssen	(Mexico) Monterrey	£6,300,000	
27 July 2019	GK	(England)	Tobi Oluwayemi	(Scotland) Celtic	Undisclosed	
29 July 2019	CF	(England)	Shayon Harrison	(Netherlands) Almere City	Free	
8 August 2019	AM	(England)	Josh Onomah	(England) Fulham	Part-deal	
22 August 2019	MF	(France)	Georges-Kévin Nkoudou	(Turkey) Beşiktaş	£4,600,000	
23 August 2019	LW	(England)	Samuel Shashoua	(Spain) Tenerife	Undisclosed	
2 September 2019	RW	(England)	Marcus Edwards	(Portugal) Vitória	Undisclosed	
16 January 2020	CM	(England)	Paris Maghoma	(England) Brentford	Undisclosed	
28 January 2020	AM	(Denmark)	Christian Eriksen	(Italy) Inter Milan	Undisclosed	
31 January 2020	CM	(England)	Tashan Oakley-Boothe	(England) Stoke City	Undisclosed	
18 February 2020	CB	(Scotland)	Luis Binks	(Canada) Montreal Impact	Undisclosed	
3 March 2020	DM	(Kenya)	Victor Wanyama	(Canada) Montreal Impact	Undisclosed	

=== Overall transfer activity ===
==== Expenditure ====
Summer: ▼£90,000,000

Winter: ▼£27,000,000

Total: ▼£117,000,000

==== Income ====
Summer: ▲£30,900,000

Winter: £0

Total: ▲£30,900,000

==== Net totals ====
Summer: ▼£59,100,000

Winter: ▼£27,000,000

Total: ▼£86,100,000

== Pre-season and friendlies ==
Tottenham took part again in the 2019 International Champions Cup as defending champions. They played in Singapore and Shanghai. They also took part in the 2019 Audi Cup in Munich.

=== 2019 International Champions Cup ===
21 July 2019 ICC	Juventus	2–3	Tottenham Hotspur	Kallang, Singapore
19:30 SST	Higuaín 56'; Ronaldo 60'	Report	Lamela 30'; Parrott (yellow card) 44'; Lucas Moura 65'; Kane 90+3'	Stadium: National Stadium; Attendance: 50,443; Referee: Ahmad A'qashah (Singapore)

25 July 2019 ICC	Tottenham Hotspur	1–2	Manchester United	Shanghai, China
19:30 CST	Alli (yellow card) 12'; Tanganga (yellow card) 42'; Lucas Moura 65'	Report	Martial 21'; Pereira (yellow card) 40'; Gomes 80'	Stadium: Hongkou Football Stadium; Referee: Kun Ai (China)

4 August 2019 ICC	Tottenham Hotspur	1–1 (3–4 p)	Internazionale	Tottenham, England
15:00 BST	Lucas Moura 3'	Report	Candreva (yellow card) 28'; Sensi 36'; Politano (yellow card) 71'	Stadium: Tottenham Hotspur Stadium; Attendance: 58,905; Referee: Andre Marriner (England)
	Penalties
	Eriksen (penalty missed); Son (penalty scored); Nkoudou (penalty scored); Alderweireld (penalty scored); Skipp (penalty missed)		(penalty missed) Pușcaș; (penalty scored) Ranocchia; (penalty scored) Dimarco; (penalty scored) Politano; (penalty scored) João Mário

=== Audi Cup ===
30 July 2019 Semi-finals	Real Madrid	0–1	Tottenham Hotspur	Munich, Germany
18:00 CEST	Ramos (yellow card) 64'	Report	Kane 22'; Georgiou (yellow card) 54'	Stadium: Allianz Arena; Referee: Tobias Stieler (Germany)

31 July 2019 Final	Tottenham Hotspur	2–2 (6–5 p)	Bayern Munich	Munich, Germany
20:30 CEST	Lamela 19'; Eriksen 59'; Foyth (yellow card) 72'	Report	Arp 61'; Davies 81'	Stadium: Allianz Arena; Attendance: 67,500; Referee: Robert Hartmann (Germany)
	Penalties
	Alderweireld (penalty scored); Eriksen (penalty missed); Kane (penalty scored); Son (penalty scored); Roles (penalty scored); Skipp (penalty scored); Tanganga (penalty scored)		(penalty missed) Alaba; (penalty scored) Thiago; (penalty scored) Müller; (penalty scored) Sanches; (penalty scored) Lewandowski; (penalty scored) Singh; (penalty missed) Boateng

=== Mid-season friendlies ===
12 June 2020 Friendly	Tottenham Hotspur	1–2	Norwich City	Tottenham, England
	Lamela	Report	Drmić; Vrančić	Stadium: Tottenham Hotspur Stadium; Attendance: 0
Note: Match played in four quarters of 30 minutes.

== Competitions ==
=== Overview ===
Competition	Record							
Competition	Pld	W	D	L	GF	GA	GD	Win %
Premier League	38	16	11	11	61	47	+14	42.11
FA Cup	5	2	3	0	8	6	+2	40.00
EFL Cup	1	0	1	0	0	0	+0	0.00
Champions League	8	3	1	4	18	18	+0	37.50
Total	52	21	16	15	87	71	+16	40.38

Source: Competitions

=== Premier League ===
==== League table ====
Pos	Team	Pld	W	D	L	GF	GA	GD	Pts	Qualification or relegation
4	Chelsea	38	20	6	12	69	54	+15	66	Qualification for the Champions League group stage
5	Leicester City	38	18	8	12	67	41	+26	62	Qualification for the Europa League group stage
6	Tottenham Hotspur	38	16	11	11	61	47	+14	59	Qualification for the Europa League second qualifying round (Note: Since the winners of the 2019–20 EFL Cup, Manchester City, qualified for the Champions League group stage by league position, the spot given to the EFL Cup winners (Europa League second qualifying round) was passed down to the sixth-placed team.)
7	Wolverhampton Wanderers	38	15	14	9	51	40	+11	59	
8	Arsenal	38	14	14	10	56	48	+8	56	Qualification for the Europa League group stage (Note: Arsenal qualified for the Europa League group stage as the 2019–20 FA Cup winners.)

Source: Premier League
Rules for classification: 1) Points; 2) Goal difference; 3) Goals scored; 4) If the champions, relegated teams or qualified teams for UEFA competitions cannot be determined by rules 1 to 3, rules 4.1 to 4.3 are applied – 4.1) Points gained in head to head record between such teams; 4.2) Away goals scored in head to head record between such teams; 4.3) Play-offs

==== Results summary ====
Overall								Home						Away					
Pld	W	D	L	GF	GA	GD	Pts	W	D	L	GF	GA	GD	W	D	L	GF	GA	GD
38	16	11	11	61	47	+14	59	12	3	4	36	17	+19	4	8	7	25	30	−5

Last updated: 26 July 2020.
Source: Premier League

==== Results by matchday ====
Matchday	1	2	3	4	5	6	7	8	9	10	11	12	13	14	15	16	17	18	19	20	21	22	23	24	25	26	27	28	29	30	31	32	33	34	35	36	37	38
Ground	H	A	H	A	H	A	H	A	H	A	A	H	A	H	A	H	A	H	H	A	A	H	A	H	H	A	A	H	A	H	H	A	H	A	H	A	H	A
Result	W	D	L	D	W	L	W	L	D	L	D	D	W	W	L	W	W	L	W	D	L	L	D	W	W	W	L	L	D	D	W	L	W	D	W	W	W	D
Position	6	6	7	9	3	7	6	9	7	11	11	14	10	5	8	7	5	7	6	6	6	8	8	6	5	5	6	7	8	8	7	9	8	9	8	7	7	6

Updated to match(es) played on 26 July 2020. Source: Premier League
A = Away; H = Home; W = Win; D = Draw; L = Loss

==== Matches ====
On 13 June 2019, the Premier League fixtures were announced.

10 August 2019 1	Tottenham Hotspur	3–1	Aston Villa	Tottenham
17:30 BST	Ndombele 73'; Kane 86', 90'; Lamela (yellow card) 87'	Report	McGinn 9'	Stadium: Tottenham Hotspur Stadium; Attendance: 60,407; Referee: Chris Kavanagh
Note: Live on Sky Sports

17 August 2019 2	Manchester City	2–2	Tottenham Hotspur	Manchester
17:30 BST	Sterling 20', (yellow card) 26'; Agüero 35'	Report	Lamela 23'; Lucas Moura 56'	Stadium: City of Manchester Stadium; Attendance: 54,503; Referee: Michael Oliver
Note: Live on Sky Sports

25 August 2019 3	Tottenham Hotspur	0–1	Newcastle United	Tottenham
16:30 BST	Winks (yellow card) 11'; Rose (yellow card) 66'	Report	Joelinton 27', (yellow card) 88'; Ritchie (yellow card) 47'	Stadium: Tottenham Hotspur Stadium; Attendance: 59,245; Referee: Mike Dean
Note: Live on Sky Sports

1 September 2019 4	Arsenal	2–2	Tottenham Hotspur	London (Holloway)
16:30 BST	Lacazette 45+1', (yellow card) 63'; Aubameyang 71'; Papastathopoulos (yellow card) 87'; Xhaka (yellow card) 90+2'	Report	Eriksen 10', (yellow card) 57'; Rose (yellow card) 28'; Lamela (yellow card) 32'; Kane 40' (pen.); Winks (yellow card) 74'; Sánchez (yellow card) 78'	Stadium: Emirates Stadium; Attendance: 60,333; Referee: Martin Atkinson
Note: Live on Sky Sports

14 September 2019 5	Tottenham Hotspur	4–0	Crystal Palace	Tottenham
15:00 BST	Son 10', 23'; Van Aanholt 21' (o.g.); Lamela 42'; Winks (yellow card) 45+2'; Rose (yellow card) 50'; Vertonghen (yellow card) 53'; Eriksen (yellow card) 60'	Report	Ayew (yellow card) 61'; Ward (yellow card) 89'; Milivojević (yellow card) 90+1'	Stadium: Tottenham Hotspur Stadium; Attendance: 59,812; Referee: Craig Pawson

21 September 2019 6	Leicester City	2–1	Tottenham Hotspur	Leicester
12:30 BST	Pereira 69'; Gray (yellow card) 83'; Maddison 85'	Report	Sissoko (yellow card) 19'; Kane 29'; Wanyama (yellow card) 71'	Stadium: King Power Stadium; Attendance: 32,129; Referee: Paul Tierney
Note: Live on BT Sport

28 September 2019 7	Tottenham Hotspur	2–1	Southampton	Tottenham
15:00 BST	Ndombele 24'; Aurier (yellow card) 27' (yellow-red card) 31'; Kane 43'	Report	Ings 39'; Yoshida (yellow card) 68'; Bednarek (yellow card) 82'	Stadium: Tottenham Hotspur Stadium; Attendance: 59,645; Referee: Graham Scott

5 October 2019 8	Brighton & Hove Albion	3–0	Tottenham Hotspur	Brighton
12:30 BST	Maupay 3'; Connolly 32', 65'; Stephens (yellow card) 57'; Dunk (yellow card) 89'	Report	Dier (yellow card) 55'	Stadium: Falmer Stadium; Attendance: 30,160; Referee: Jonathan Moss

19 October 2019 9	Tottenham Hotspur	1–1	Watford	Tottenham
15:00 BST	Sánchez (yellow card) 13'; Sissoko (yellow card) 77'; Alli 86', (yellow card) 90'; Rose (yellow card) 89'	Report	Doucouré 6'; Pereyra (yellow card) 84'; Femenía (yellow card) 88'; Holebas (yellow card) 90'	Stadium: Tottenham Hotspur Stadium; Attendance: 58,754; Referee: Chris Kavanagh

27 October 2019 10	Liverpool	2–1	Tottenham Hotspur	Liverpool
16:30 GMT	Lovren (yellow card) 50'; Henderson 52'; Alexander-Arnold (yellow card) 64'; Salah 75' (pen.); Milner (yellow card) 90+1'	Report	Kane 1'; Sissoko (yellow card) 36'; Rose (yellow card) 37'; Ndombele (yellow card) 72'	Stadium: Anfield; Attendance: 53,222; Referee: Anthony Taylor

3 November 2019 11	Everton	1–1	Tottenham Hotspur	Liverpool
16:30 GMT	Walcott (yellow card) 30'; Tosun 90+7'	Report	Eriksen (yellow card) 31'; Alli 63'; Ndombele (yellow card) 65'; Son (red card) 79'	Stadium: Goodison Park; Attendance: 39,001; Referee: Martin Atkinson

9 November 2019 12	Tottenham Hotspur	1–1	Sheffield United	Tottenham
15:00 GMT	Dier (yellow card) 2'; Son 58'; Foyth (yellow card) 80'	Report	Norwood (yellow card) 18'; Baldock 78'; Basham (yellow card) 90+1'	Stadium: Tottenham Hotspur Stadium; Attendance: 59,781; Referee: Graham Scott

23 November 2019 13	West Ham United	2–3	Tottenham Hotspur	Stratford
12:30 GMT	Diop (yellow card) 11'; Fredericks (yellow card) 39'; Antonio 73'; Snodgrass (yellow card) 87'; Ogbonna 90+6'	Report	Son 36'; Lucas Moura 43'; Kane 49', (yellow card) 87'; Davies (yellow card) 70'	Stadium: London Stadium; Attendance: 59,930; Referee: Michael Oliver

30 November 2019 14	Tottenham Hotspur	3–2	Bournemouth	Tottenham
15:00 GMT	Alli 21', 50'; Sissoko 69'	Report	Rico (yellow card) 67'; H. Wilson 73', 90+6'; Lerma (yellow card) 90'	Stadium: Tottenham Hotspur Stadium; Attendance: 59,626; Referee: Lee Mason

4 December 2019 15	Manchester United	2–1	Tottenham Hotspur	Greater Manchester
19:30 GMT	Rashford 7', 49' (pen.)	Report	Winks (yellow card) 13'; Alli 39'	Stadium: Old Trafford; Attendance: 73,252; Referee: Paul Tierney

7 December 2019 16	Tottenham Hotspur	5–0	Burnley	Tottenham
15:00 GMT	Kane 4', 54'; Lucas Moura 9'; Son 32'; Dier (yellow card) 73'; Sissoko 74'	Report	Lowton (yellow card) 22'	Stadium: Tottenham Hotspur Stadium; Attendance: 58,401; Referee: Kevin Friend

15 December 2019 17	Wolverhampton Wanderers	1–2	Tottenham Hotspur	Wolverhampton
14:00 GMT	Moutinho (yellow card) 60'; Jonny (yellow card) 65'; Traoré 67'; Saïss (yellow card) 75'; Dendoncker (yellow card) 89'	Report	Lucas Moura 8'; Sánchez (yellow card) 64'; Alderweireld (yellow card) 69'; Dier (yellow card) 77'; Kane (yellow card) 83'; Vertonghen 90+1'	Stadium: Molineux Stadium; Attendance: 31,674; Referee: Stuart Attwell

22 December 2019 18	Tottenham Hotspur	0–2	Chelsea	Tottenham
16:30 GMT	Alli (yellow card) 43'; Gazzaniga (yellow card) 45+3'; Sissoko (yellow card) 58'; Son (red card) 62'; Alderweireld (yellow card) 67'	Report	Willian 12', 45+4' (pen.); Zouma (yellow card) 31'; Kovačić (yellow card) 43'; Rüdiger (yellow card) 78'	Stadium: Tottenham Hotspur Stadium; Attendance: 61,104; Referee: Anthony Taylor

26 December 2019 19	Tottenham Hotspur	2–1	Brighton & Hove Albion	Tottenham
12:30 GMT	Winks (yellow card) 36'; Sánchez (yellow card) 39'; Kane 53'; Alli 72'; Lucas Moura (yellow card) 74'; Sissoko (yellow card) 84'	Report	Burn (yellow card) 30'; Webster 37'; Groß (yellow card) 42'	Stadium: Tottenham Hotspur Stadium; Attendance: 56,308; Referee: Graham Scott

28 December 2019 20	Norwich City	2–2	Tottenham Hotspur	Norwich
17:30 GMT	Vrančić 18', (yellow card) 22'; Lewis (yellow card) 54'; Krul (yellow card) 57'; Aurier 61' (o.g.)	Report	Eriksen 55', (yellow card) 90+6'; Lucas Moura (yellow card) 69'; Kane 83' (pen.); Alderweireld (yellow card) 90+3'	Stadium: Carrow Road; Attendance: 27,072; Referee: Kevin Friend

1 January 2020 21	Southampton	1–0	Tottenham Hotspur	Southampton
15:00 GMT	Ings 17'; Djenepo (yellow card) 53'; Bednarek (yellow card) 68'; Ward-Prowse (yellow card) 72'	Report	Lo Celso (yellow card) 36'; Sissoko (yellow card) 61'; Aurier (yellow card) 70'; Eriksen (yellow card) 90+2'	Stadium: St Mary's Stadium; Attendance: 30,976; Referee: Mike Dean

11 January 2020 22	Tottenham Hotspur	0–1	Liverpool	Tottenham
17:30 GMT		Report	Gomez (yellow card) 23'; Firmino 37'; Oxlade-Chamberlain (yellow card) 39'	Stadium: Tottenham Hotspur Stadium; Attendance: 61,023; Referee: Martin Atkinson

18 January 2020 23	Watford	0–0	Tottenham Hotspur	Watford
12:30 GMT	Capoue (yellow card) 35'; Doucouré (yellow card) 60'; Deeney (penalty missed) 70’	Report	Tanganga (yellow card) 19'; Winks (yellow card) 60'; Vertonghen (yellow card) 69'	Stadium: Vicarage Road; Attendance: 21,366; Referee: Michael Oliver

22 January 2020 24	Tottenham Hotspur	2–1	Norwich City	Tottenham
19:30 GMT	Alli 38'; Son 80'	Report	Cantwell (yellow card) 47'; Pukki 70' (pen.)	Stadium: Tottenham Hotspur Stadium; Attendance: 58,182; Referee: Chris Kavanagh

2 February 2020 25	Tottenham Hotspur	2–0	Manchester City	Tottenham
16:30 GMT	Alderweireld (yellow card) 42'; Bergwijn 63'; Lo Celso (yellow card) 66'; Son 71'	Report	Sterling (yellow card) 12'; Walker (yellow card) 33'; Gündoğan (penalty missed) 40'; Zinchenko (yellow card) 42' (yellow-red card) 60'; Rodri (yellow card) 90+4'	Stadium: Tottenham Hotspur Stadium; Attendance: 61,022; Referee: Mike Dean

16 February 2020 26	Aston Villa	2–3	Tottenham Hotspur	Aston
14:00 GMT	Alderweireld 9' (o.g.); Engels 53'; Guilbert (yellow card) 86'; Nakamba (yellow card) 90+2'	Report	Alderweireld 27'; Son (penalty missed) 45+2’, 45+2', 90+4'	Stadium: Villa Park; Attendance: 41,874; Referee: Martin Atkinson

22 February 2020 27	Chelsea	2–1	Tottenham Hotspur	Fulham
12:30 GMT	Giroud 15'; Alonso 48'; Christensen (yellow card) 65'	Report	Winks (yellow card) 23'; Lo Celso (yellow card) 81'; Rüdiger 89' (o.g.)	Stadium: Stamford Bridge; Attendance: 40,608; Referee: Michael Oliver

1 March 2020 28	Tottenham Hotspur	2–3	Wolverhampton Wanderers	Tottenham
14:00 GMT	Bergwijn 13'; Aurier 45'; Lo Celso (yellow card) 59'; Winks (yellow card) 84'; Davies (yellow card) 84'	Report	Doherty 27'; Jota 57'; Boly (yellow card) 71'; Jiménez 73'; Dendoncker (yellow card) 90+5'	Stadium: Tottenham Hotspur Stadium; Attendance: 58,064; Referee: Stuart Attwell

7 March 2020 29	Burnley	1–1	Tottenham Hotspur	Burnley
17:30 GMT	Wood 13'; Taylor (yellow card) 51'; Tarkowski (yellow card) 57'; Cork (yellow card) 59'; Hendrick (yellow card) 76'; Westwood (yellow card) 90+3'	Report	Lamela (yellow card) 19'; Alli 50' (pen.); Sánchez (yellow card) 56'; Bergwijn (yellow card) 78'; Lo Celso (yellow card) 90+2'	Stadium: Turf Moor; Attendance: 20,496; Referee: Jonathan Moss

19 June 2020 30	Tottenham Hotspur	1–1	Manchester United	Tottenham
20:15 BST	Bergwijn 27'	Report	James (yellow card) 41'; Fernandes 81' (pen.)	Stadium: Tottenham Hotspur Stadium; Attendance: 0 Referee: Jonathan Moss
Note: The match was postponed on 13 March due to concerns over the coronavirus pandemic, It was rescheduled to 19 June.

23 June 2020 31	Tottenham Hotspur	2–0	West Ham United	Tottenham
20:15 BST	Kane (yellow card) 51', (goal) 82'; Souček 64' (o.g.); Davies (yellow card) 67'	Report	Fornals (yellow card) 15'; Noble (yellow card) 26'	Stadium: Tottenham Hotspur Stadium; Attendance: 0 Referee: Craig Pawson
Note: The match was postponed on 13 March due to concerns over the coronavirus pandemic. It was rescheduled to 23 June.

2 July 2020 32	Sheffield United	3–1	Tottenham Hotspur	Sheffield
18:00 BST	Berge 31'; Norwood (yellow card) 39'; Mousset 69'; McBurnie 84', (yellow card) 89'	Report	Kane 90'	Stadium: Bramall Lane; Attendance: 0 Referee: Chris Kavanagh
Note: The match was postponed on 13 March due to concerns over the coronavirus pandemic. It was rescheduled to 2 July.

6 July 2020 33	Tottenham Hotspur	1–0	Everton	Tottenham
20:00 BST	Keane 24' (o.g.); Sissoko (yellow card) 48'; Davies (yellow card) 76'; Alderweireld (yellow card) 84'	Report	Holgate (yellow card) 28'; Gomes (yellow card) 87'	Stadium: Tottenham Hotspur Stadium; Attendance: 0 Referee: Graham Scott
Note: The match was postponed on 13 March due to concerns over the coronavirus pandemic. It was rescheduled to 6 July.

9 July 2020 34	Bournemouth	0–0	Tottenham Hotspur	Bournemouth
18:00 BST	Lerma (yellow card) 31'; Gosling (yellow card) 87'; H. Wilson (yellow card) 90+5'	Report	Sissoko (yellow card) 31'; Ndombele (yellow card) 87'	Stadium: Vitality Stadium; Attendance: 0 Referee: Paul Tierney
Note: The match was postponed on 3 April due to concerns over the coronavirus pandemic. It was rescheduled to 9 July.

12 July 2020 35	Tottenham Hotspur	2–1	Arsenal	Tottenham
16:30 BST	Lo Celso (yellow card) 16'; Son 19'; Aurier (yellow card) 34'; Davies (yellow card) 45+2'; Winks (yellow card) 76'; Alderweireld 81'; Bergwijn (yellow card) 87'	Report	Lacazette 16', (yellow card) 45'; Pépé (yellow card) 61'; Saka (yellow card) 90'	Stadium: Tottenham Hotspur Stadium; Attendance: 0 Referee: Michael Oliver
Note: The match was postponed on 3 April due to concerns over the coronavirus pandemic. It was rescheduled to 12 July.

15 July 2020 36	Newcastle United	1–3	Tottenham Hotspur	Newcastle upon Tyne
18:00 BST	Fernández (yellow card) 35'; Ritchie 56'; Shelvey (yellow card) 65'	Report	Son 27'; Alderweireld (yellow card) 31'; Kane 60', 90', (yellow card) 74'; Davies (yellow card) 85'	Stadium: St James' Park; Attendance: 0 Referee: David Coote
Note: The match was postponed on 3 April due to concerns over the coronavirus pandemic. It was rescheduled to 15 July.

19 July 2020 37	Tottenham Hotspur	3–0	Leicester City	Tottenham
16:00 BST	Justin 6' (o.g.); Kane 37', 40'; Lucas Moura (yellow card) 57'; Sánchez (yellow card) 86'	Report	Evans (yellow card) 73'	Stadium: Tottenham Hotspur Stadium; Attendance: 0 Referee: Anthony Taylor
Note: The match was postponed on 3 April due to concerns over the coronavirus pandemic. It was rescheduled to 19 July.

26 July 2020 38	Crystal Palace	1–1	Tottenham Hotspur	Selhurst
16:00 BST	McCarthy (yellow card) 17'; Mitchell (yellow card) 49'; Schlupp 53'; Kouyaté (yellow card) 75'	Report	Kane 13'; Alderweireld (yellow card) 61'; Dier (yellow card) 90+1'	Stadium: Selhurst Park; Attendance: 0 Referee: Andre Marriner
Note: The match was postponed on 3 April due to concerns over the coronavirus pandemic. It was rescheduled to 26 July.

=== FA Cup ===
The third round draw was made on 2 December 2019. The fourth round draw was made by Alex Scott and David O'Leary on Monday, 6 January.

5 January 2020 Third round	Middlesbrough	1–1	Tottenham Hotspur	Middlesbrough
14:01 GMT	Fletcher 50'; Saville (yellow card) 85'	Report	Alli (yellow card) 45'; Lucas Moura 61'; Lamela (yellow card) 85'	Stadium: Riverside Stadium; Attendance: 26,693; Referee: Stuart Attwell

14 January 2020 Third round replay	Tottenham Hotspur	2–1	Middlesbrough	Tottenham
20:05 GMT	Lo Celso 2'; Lamela 15'	Report	Saville 83'	Stadium: Tottenham Hotspur Stadium; Attendance: 49,202; Referee: Craig Pawson

25 January 2020 Fourth round	Southampton	1–1	Tottenham Hotspur	Southampton
15:00 GMT	Bertrand (yellow card) 77'; Boufal 87'; Bednarek (yellow card) 90+2'	Report	Son 58'	Stadium: St Mary's Stadium; Attendance: 29,282; Referee: Peter Bankes

5 February 2020 Fourth round replay	Tottenham Hotspur	3–2	Southampton	Tottenham
19:45 GMT	Stephens 12' (o.g.); Fernandes (yellow card) 59'; Lucas Moura 78'; Son 87' (pen.)	Report	Long 34'; Bednarek (yellow card) 55'; Ings 72'; Romeu (yellow card) 84'; Adams (yellow card) 85'; Gunn (yellow card) 86'	Stadium: Tottenham Hotspur Stadium; Attendance: 56,046; Referee: David Coote

4 March 2020 Fifth round	Tottenham Hotspur	1–1 (a.e.t.) (2–3 p)	Norwich City	Tottenham
19:45 GMT	Vertonghen 13'; Skipp (yellow card) 71'	Report	Vrančić (yellow card) 12'; Hanley (yellow card) 73'; Drmić 78'	Stadium: Tottenham Hotspur Stadium; Attendance: 58,007; Referee: Paul Tierney
	Penalties
	Dier (penalty scored); Lamela (penalty missed); Lo Celso (penalty scored); Parrott (penalty missed); Fernandes (penalty missed)		(penalty missed) McLean; (penalty scored) Idah; (penalty scored) Stiepermann; (penalty scored) Cantwell

=== EFL Cup ===
The third round draw was made on 28 August 2019 by Andy Hinchcliffe and Don Goodman.

24 September 2019 Third round	Colchester United	0–0 (4–3 p)	Tottenham Hotspur	Colchester
19:45 BST	Cowan-Hall (yellow card) 56'	Report		Stadium: Colchester Community Stadium; Attendance: 9,481; Referee: Jarred Gillett
	Penalties
	Norris (penalty scored); Nouble (penalty scored); Brown (penalty missed); Cowan-Hall (penalty scored); Lapslie (penalty scored)		(penalty missed) Eriksen; (penalty scored) Alli; (penalty scored) Lamela; (penalty scored) Son; (penalty missed) Lucas Moura

=== UEFA Champions League ===
Tottenham entered the competition in the group stage following their fourth-place finish in the 2018–19 season. Spurs were drawn with Bayern Munich, Olympiacos and Red Star Belgrade. The draw for the last 16 took place on 16 December 2019 in which Tottenham were drawn against RB Leipzig.

==== Group stage ====
Pos	Team	Pld	W	D	L	GF	GA	GD	Pts	Qualification	BAY	TOT	OLY	RSB
1	(Germany) Bayern Munich	6	6	0	0	24	5	+19	18	Advance to knockout phase	—	3–1	2–0	3–0
2	(England) Tottenham Hotspur	6	3	1	2	18	14	+4	10	Advance to knockout phase	2–7	—	4–2	5–0
3	(Greece) Olympiacos	6	1	1	4	8	14	−6	4	Transfer to Europa League	2–3	2–2	—	1–0
4	(Serbia) Red Star Belgrade	6	1	0	5	3	20	−17	3		0–6	0–4	3–1	—

Source: UEFA

18 September 2019 1	Olympiacos (Greece)	2–2	(England) Tottenham Hotspur	Piraeus, Greece
17:55 BST	Guilherme (yellow card) 14'; Podence 44'; Valbuena 54' (pen.)	Report	Kane 26' (pen.); Lucas Moura 30'; Winks (yellow card) 88'	Stadium: Karaiskakis Stadium; Attendance: 31,001; Referee: Gianluca Rocchi (Italy)

1 October 2019 2	Tottenham Hotspur (England)	2–7	(Germany) Bayern Munich	London, England
20:00 BST	Son 12'; Ndombele (yellow card) 42'; Kane (yellow card) 46', (goal) 61' (pen.)	Report	Kimmich 15'; Gnabry (yellow card) 25', (goal) 53', 55', 83', 88'; Lewandowski 45', 87'	Stadium: Tottenham Hotspur Stadium; Attendance: 60,127; Referee: Clément Turpin (France)

22 October 2019 3	Tottenham Hotspur (England)	5–0	(Serbia) Red Star Belgrade	London, England
20:00 BST	Kane 9', 72'; Son 16', 44'; Lamela 57'	Report	Milunović (yellow card) 83'	Stadium: Tottenham Hotspur Stadium; Attendance: 51,743; Referee: Marco Guida (Italy)

6 November 2019 4	Red Star Belgrade (Serbia)	0–4	(England) Tottenham Hotspur	Belgrade, Serbia
20:00 GMT	Petrović (yellow card) 65'	Report	Dier (yellow card) 30'; Lo Celso 34'; Son 57', 61'; Eriksen 85'; Skipp (yellow card) 90+2'	Stadium: Red Star Stadium; Attendance: 42,381; Referee: Carlos del Cerro Grande (Spain)

26 November 2019 5	Tottenham Hotspur (England)	4–2	(Greece) Olympiacos	London, England
20:00 GMT	Alli 45+1'; Kane 50', 77'; Alderweireld (yellow card) 61'; Aurier 73'	Report	El-Arabi 6'; Semedo 19', (yellow card) 39'; Bouchalakis (yellow card) 68'; Tsimikas (yellow card) 71'; Podence (yellow card) 75'	Stadium: Tottenham Hotspur Stadium; Attendance: 57,024; Referee: Georgi Kabakov (Bulgaria)

11 December 2019 6	Bayern Munich (Germany)	3–1	(England) Tottenham Hotspur	Munich, Germany
20:00 GMT	Coman 14'; Kimmich (yellow card) 36'; Müller 45'; Coutinho 64'	Report	Sessegnon 20'; Lo Celso (yellow card) 37'	Stadium: Allianz Arena; Attendance: 66,353; Referee: Gianluca Rocchi (Italy)

==== Knockout phase ====
===== Round of 16 =====
19 February 2020 First leg	Tottenham Hotspur (England)	0–1	(Germany) RB Leipzig	London, England
20:00 GMT	Lo Celso (yellow card) 10'; Davies (yellow card) 56'; Lamela (yellow card) 90+4'	Report	Sabitzer (yellow card) 12'; Werner (yellow card) 33', (goal) 58' (pen.); Nkunku (yellow card) 72'	Stadium: Tottenham Hotspur Stadium; Attendance: 60,095; Referee: Cüneyt Çakır (Turkey)

10 March 2020 Second leg	RB Leipzig (Germany)	3–0 (4–0 agg.)	(England) Tottenham Hotspur	Leipzig, Germany
20:00 GMT	Sabitzer 10', 21', (yellow card) 71'; Laimer (yellow card) 50'; Forsberg 87'	Report	Sessegnon (yellow card) 34'; Winks (yellow card) 45+1'; Tanganga (yellow card) 69'; Alli (yellow card) 70'	Stadium: Red Bull Arena; Attendance: 42,146; Referee: Carlos del Cerro Grande (Spain)

== Statistics ==
=== Appearances ===
Last updated: 26 July 2020.
Source: premierleague.com, uefa.com

No.	Pos.	Name	Premier League		FA Cup		EFL Cup		Champions League		Total	
No.	Pos.	Name	Apps	Goals	Apps	Goals	Apps	Goals	Apps	Goals	Apps	Goals
Goalkeepers
1	GK	(France) Hugo Lloris	21	0	2	0	0	0	4	0	27	0
13	GK	(Netherlands) Michel Vorm	0	0	1	0	0	0	0	0	1	0
22	GK	(Argentina) Paulo Gazzaniga	17+1	0	2	0	1	0	4	0	24+1	0
Defenders
3	DF	(England) Danny Rose	10+2	0	0	0	0	0	4	0	14+2	0
4	DF	(Belgium) Toby Alderweireld	33	2	3	0	0	0	6	0	42	2
5	DF	(Belgium) Jan Vertonghen	19+4	1	4	1	0	0	3	0	26+4	2
6	DF	(Colombia) Davinson Sánchez	27+2	0	3+1	0	1	0	5	0	36+4	0
16	DF	(England) Kyle Walker-Peters	3	0	0	0	1	0	1	0	5	0
21	DF	(Argentina) Juan Foyth	1+3	0	0	0	0	0	2+1	0	3+4	0
24	DF	(Ivory Coast) Serge Aurier	31+2	1	4	0	0	0	5	1	40+2	2
33	DF	(Wales) Ben Davies	16+2	0	0	0	1	0	3	0	20+2	0
39	DF	(England) Japhet Tanganga	6	0	3	0	1	0	1	0	11	0
64	DF	(England) Malachi Fagan-Walcott	0	0	0	0	0	0	0+1	0	0+1	0
Midfielders
8	MF	(England) Harry Winks	26+5	0	5	0	0	0	5	0	36+5	0
11	MF	(Argentina) Erik Lamela	12+13	2	1+3	1	0+1	0	2+3	1	15+20	4
15	MF	(England) Eric Dier	15+4	0	4+1	0	1	0	4+1	0	24+6	0
17	MF	(France) Moussa Sissoko	28+1	2	0	0	0	0	4+2	0	32+3	2
18	MF	(Argentina) Giovani Lo Celso	15+13	0	3+1	1	0	0	4+1	1	22+15	2
19	MF	(England) Ryan Sessegnon	4+2	0	3	0	0	0	2+1	1	9+3	1
20	MF	(England) Dele Alli	21+4	8	3+2	0	1	0	7	1	32+6	9
23	MF	(Netherlands) Steven Bergwijn	8+6	3	1	0	0	0	1	0	10+6	3
27	MF	(Brazil) Lucas Moura	25+10	4	5	2	1	0	5+1	1	36+11	7
28	MF	(France) Tanguy Ndombele	12+9	2	1+1	0	0	0	4+2	0	17+12	2
29	MF	(England) Oliver Skipp	1+6	0	1	0	1	0	0+2	0	3+8	0
30	MF	(Portugal) Gedson Fernandes	0+7	0	1+2	0	0	0	1+1	0	2+10	0
Forwards
7	FW	(South Korea) Son Heung-min	28+2	11	3+1	2	0+1	0	4+2	5	35+6	18
10	FW	(England) Harry Kane	29	18	0	0	0	0	5	6	34	24
52	FW	(Republic of Ireland) Troy Parrott	0+2	0	0+1	0	1	0	0	0	1+3	0
Players transferred out during the season
12	MF	(Kenya) Victor Wanyama	0+2	0	0	0	1	0	0+1	0	1+3	0
14	MF	(France) Georges-Kévin Nkoudou	0+1	0	0	0	0	0	0	0	0+1	0
23	MF	(Denmark) Christian Eriksen	10+10	2	2	0	0+1	0	2+3	1	14+14	3

=== Goal scorers ===
The list is sorted by shirt number when total goals are equal.

Rnk	Pos	No.	Player	Premier League	FA Cup	EFL Cup	Champions League	Total
1	FW	10	(England) Harry Kane	18	0	0	6	24
2	FW	7	(South Korea) Son Heung-min	11	2	0	5	18
3	MF	20	(England) Dele Alli	8	0	0	1	9
4	MF	27	(Brazil) Lucas Moura	4	2	0	1	7
5	MF	11	(Argentina) Erik Lamela	2	1	0	1	4
6	MF	23	(Denmark) Christian Eriksen	2	0	0	1	3
6	FW	23	(Netherlands) Steven Bergwijn	3	0	0	0	3
8	DF	4	(Belgium) Toby Alderweireld	2	0	0	0	2
8	DF	5	(Belgium) Jan Vertonghen	1	1	0	0	2
8	MF	17	(France) Moussa Sissoko	2	0	0	0	2
8	MF	18	(Argentina) Giovani Lo Celso	0	1	0	1	2
8	DF	24	(Ivory Coast) Serge Aurier	1	0	0	1	2
8	MF	28	(France) Tanguy Ndombele	2	0	0	0	2
14	DF	19	(England) Ryan Sessegnon	0	0	0	1	1
TOTALS				56	7	0	18	81

Last updated: 26 July 2020.
Source: premierleague.com, UEFA.com

==== Own goals ====
Player	Against	Competition	Minute	Score after own goal	Result	Date
(Ivory Coast) Serge Aurier	(England) Norwich	Premier League	61'	2-1	2-2 (A)	28 December 2019
(Belgium) Toby Alderweireld	(England) Aston Villa	Premier League	9'	1-0	2-3 (A)	16 February 2020

=== Clean sheets ===
The list is sorted by shirt number when total clean sheets are equal.

Rnk	No.	Player	Premier League	FA Cup	EFL Cup	Champions League	Total
1	1	(France) Hugo Lloris	6	0	0	0	6
2	22	(Argentina) Paulo Gazzaniga	2	0	1	2	5
TOTALS			8	0	1	2	11

Last updated: 19 July 2020.
Source: premierleague.com
