= All or Nothing: Juventus =

Amazon Original sports docuseries

- Cover of the docuseries
- Genre: Sports documentary
- Directed by: Beppe Tufarulo
- Starring: Giorgio Chiellini; Leonardo Bonucci; Andrea Pirlo
- No. of seasons: 1
- No. of episodes: 8

Production
- Production locations: Turin, Italy
- Running time: 34–48 minutes

Original release
- Network: Amazon Prime Video
- Release: 25 November 2021

All or Nothing: Juventus is an Amazon Original docuseries as part of the All or Nothing brand. In the series, Italian Serie A side Juventus's progress was charted through their 2020–21 season.

The series was produced by Fulwell 73 and premiered on 25 November 2021.

== Plot ==
All or Nothing: Juventus features a turbulent season for the club. Despite winning two trophies, the 2020–21 Coppa Italia and the 2020 Supercoppa Italiana, newly appointed coach Andrea Pirlo failed to lead the club to the tenth Serie A title in a row and was knocked out in the round of 16 of the Champions League by Porto.

== Episodes ==
No. in series	Title
1	"Everything Changes"
2	"New Players and Veterans"
3	"The Group's Spirit"
4	"A Leadership"
5	"Friendship and Rivalry"
6	"New Horizons"
7	"A New Juventus"
8	"Till the End"
