= Oleksandr Zinchenko (footballer) =

Ukrainian footballer (born 1996)

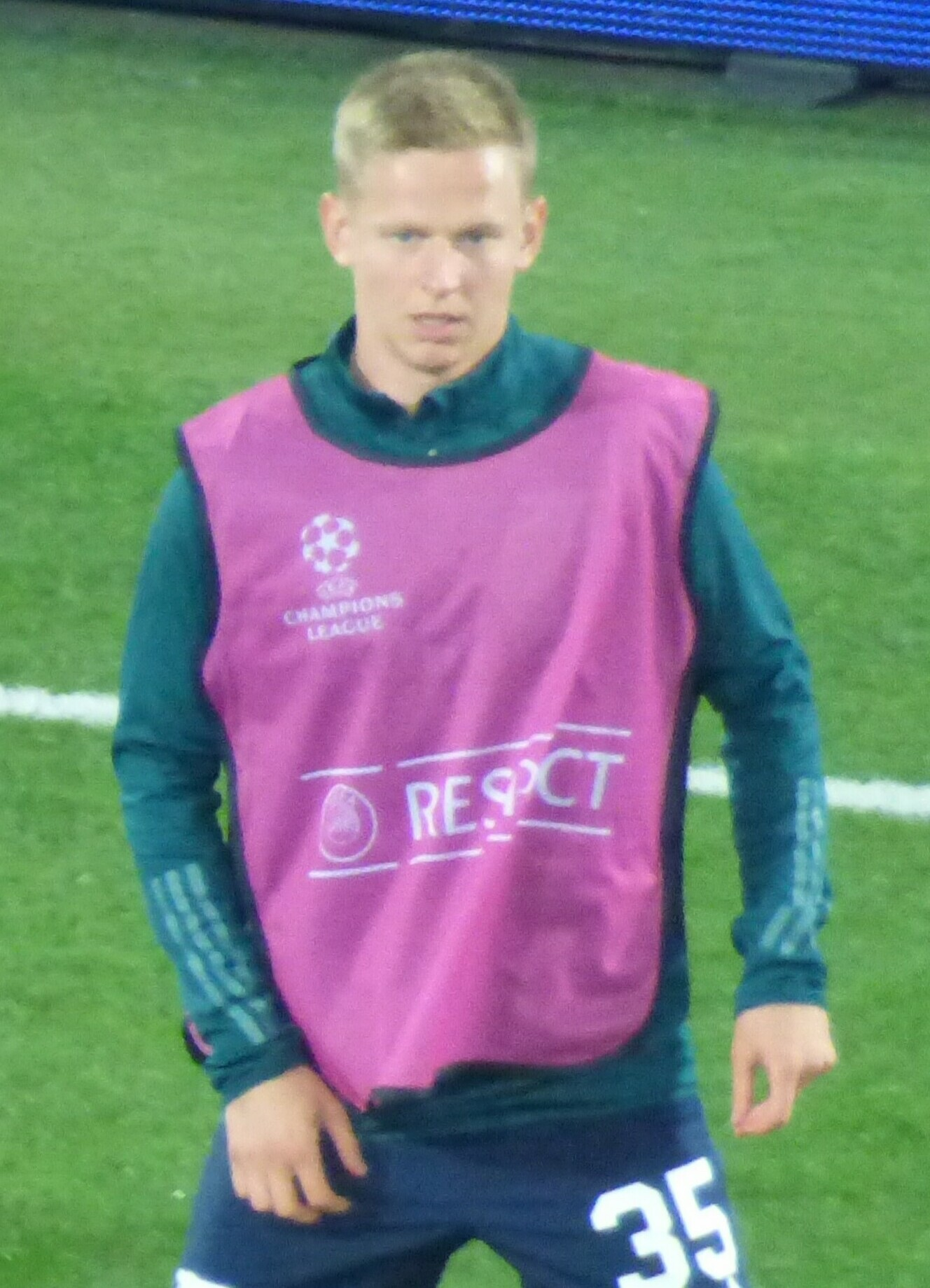
- Zinchenko with Arsenal in 2023

Personal information
- Full name: Oleksandr Volodymyrovych Zinchenko
- Date of birth: 15 December 1996 (age 29)
- Place of birth: Radomyshl, Ukraine
- Height: 1.75 m (5 ft 9 in)
- Positions: Left-back; midfielder

Youth career
- 2004–2008: Youth Sportive School Karpatia
- 2008–2009: Monolit Illichivsk
- 2010–2014: Shakhtar Donetsk

Senior career*
Years	Team	Apps	(Gls)
2015–2016	Ufa	31	(2)
2016–2022	Manchester City	76	(0)
2016–2017	→ PSV (loan)	12	(0)
2017	→ Jong PSV (loan)	7	(0)
2022–2026	Arsenal	69	(2)
2025–2026	→ Nottingham Forest (loan)	5	(0)
2026	Ajax	2	(0)

International career^{‡}
2011–2012	Ukraine U16	2	(0)
2012–2013	Ukraine U17	6	(1)
2013	Ukraine U18	6	(1)
2014–2015	Ukraine U19	6	(1)
2015–2017	Ukraine U21	8	(1)
2015–	Ukraine	75	(12)
- * Club domestic league appearances and goals as of 14 February 2026 ‡ National team caps and goals as of 9 September 2025

Oleksandr Volodymyrovych Zinchenko (Ukrainian: Олександр Володимирович Зінченко; born 15 December 1996) is a Ukrainian professional footballer who plays as a left-back or midfielder for the Ukraine national team.

Zinchenko began his career at Russian Premier League team Ufa before joining Manchester City in 2016 for a fee around £1.7 million. He started his career as an attacking midfielder, but eventually converted into a left-back under Pep Guardiola. He won four Premier League titles, four EFL Cups and an FA Cup with the club. He moved to Arsenal in July 2022 for a fee of £30 million.

A full Ukrainian international since 2015, Zinchenko represented his country at the UEFA European Championship in 2016, 2020 and 2024.

== Club career ==
=== Early career ===
Zinchenko was born in Radomyshl, Zhytomyr Oblast. He is a product of Youth Sporitve School Karpatiya of his native Radomyshl (with first coach Serhiy Boretskyi), FC Monolit Illichivsk and Shakhtar Donetsk, where he became the captain of the youth team. On 9 December 2013, he scored a goal in a 1–1 draw with Manchester United in the 2013–14 UEFA Youth League.

He moved with his parents to Russia due to the war in Donbas. Shakhtar Donetsk wanted him back despite offering no playing time, but he did not return for security reasons. He spent between five and six months in the amateur leagues in Moscow. He then trained with Rubin Kazan but the club did not sign him to a contract since Zinchenko was still under contract to Shakhtar, and Rubin would risk incurring a transfer ban if they attempted to sign him.

On 12 February 2015, he signed a contract with Ufa. (Note: After terminating his contract with Shakhtar Donetsk and signing with Ufa, Shakhtar took the case to FIFA's Dispute Resolution Chamber, which ordered Zinchenko to pay approximately €8,000 in compensation.) He made his Russian Premier League debut for Ufa on 20 March 2015 in a match against FC Krasnodar. On 25 July 2015, he scored his first goal in a 2–1 defeat against FC Rostov.

=== Manchester City ===
==== 2016–2019 ====
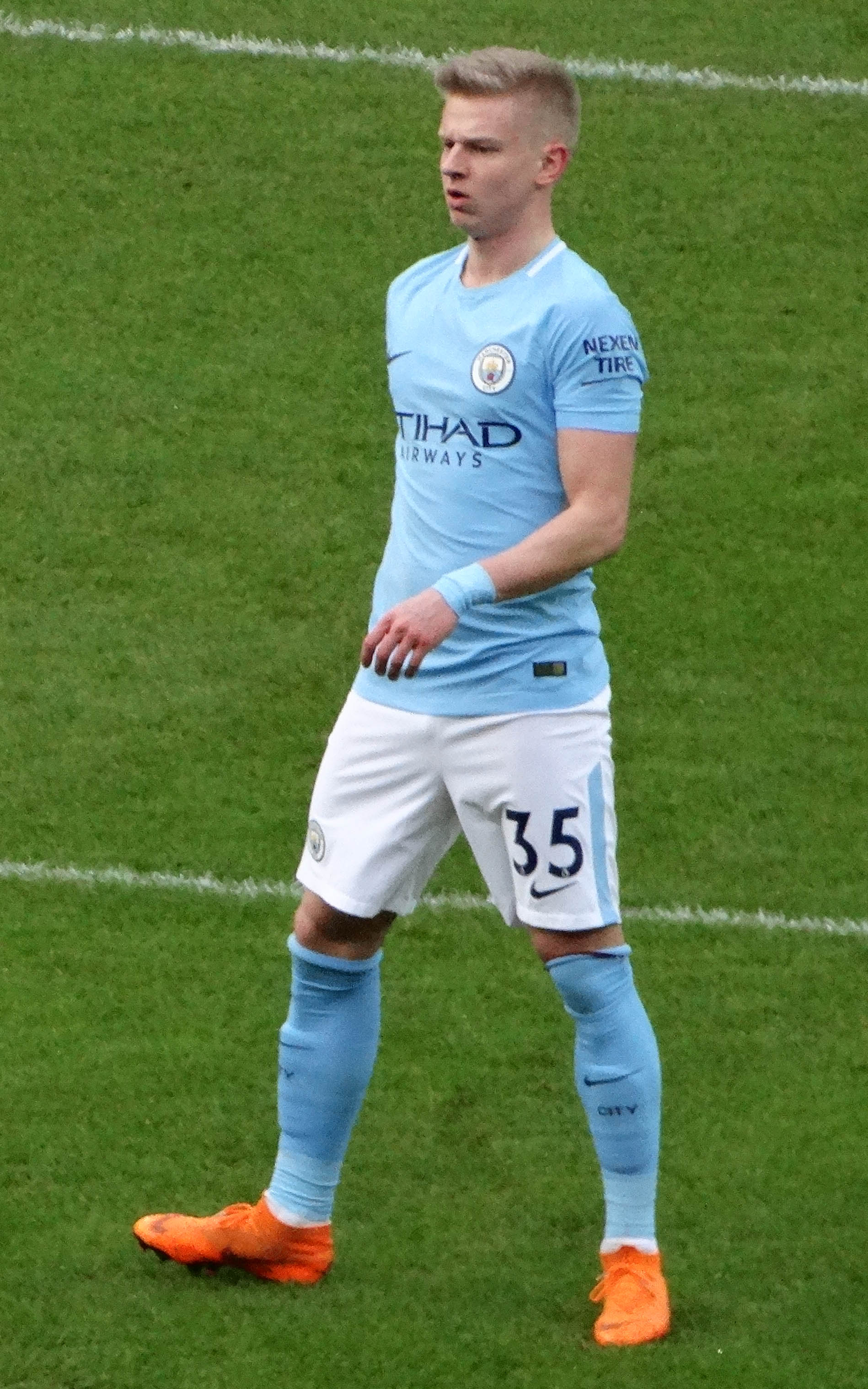
Zinchenko playing for Manchester City in 2018

On 4 July 2016, Zinchenko signed for Premier League club Manchester City for an undisclosed fee believed to be around £1.7 million. He was described by a Russian football scout as a "real talent", with Bundesliga club Borussia Dortmund also monitoring him.

Zinchenko was loaned to Eredivisie club PSV on 26 August, for the 2016–17 season. He made his debut on 1 October, as a substitute in a 1–1 draw against SC Heerenveen.

Zinchenko returned to Manchester City for the 2017–18 season, and made his debut on 24 October 2017, playing the full match including extra time in a 0–0 draw with Wolverhampton Wanderers in the EFL Cup. He made his first Premier League appearance on 13 December 2017, coming off the bench in a 4–0 away win at Swansea City.

On 18 December 2017, Zinchenko scored the winning penalty kick against Leicester City after a 1–1 stalemate in regulation time, sending Manchester City through to the semi-finals of the EFL Cup.

Zinchenko gained an extended run in the side following injuries to left backs Benjamin Mendy and Fabian Delph, putting in a number of consistent performances in the position.

Zinchenko made his first appearance of the 2018–19 season in a 3–0 away win at Oxford United in the EFL Cup. In the same week, he made his first league start of the season in a 2–0 home win against Brighton & Hove Albion, due to injuries to Mendy and Delph.

==== 2019–2022 ====
Zinchenko scored his first goal for Manchester City in the EFL Cup semi-final against Burton Albion on 9 January 2019, a 9–0 home win.

In June 2019, he signed a new contract with the club, to keep him with them until 2024. On 25 October 2019, Zinchenko had a knee surgery in Barcelona. Manchester City coach Pep Guardiola told that the recovery from the injury would take from 5 to 6 weeks: "He had a contact with a knee. He felt something in the bone and had to stop. He had something to clean up the knee. It was not a big issue. Five or six weeks." At the beginning of December 2019, Zinchenko returned to full training. On 11 December 2019, he played his first game after the injury against Dinamo Zagreb. On 4 January 2020, he scored his second goal for Manchester City in a 4–1 win over Port Vale in the FA Cup.

On 4 May 2021, Zinchenko was a part of the starting XI that saw Manchester City qualify for their first UEFA Champions League final, after beating Paris Saint-Germain 2–0 on the night and 4–1 on aggregate. On 29 May, he later started that Champions League Final, which his team lost 1–0 against Chelsea. On the final matchday of the 2021–22 season, he came on as a substitute and earned an assist against Aston Villa, overturning a two-goal deficit to eventually win the game 3–2 to hand him his fourth Premier League medal.

=== Arsenal ===
On 22 July 2022, Zinchenko signed for Premier League club Arsenal on a long-term contract for a reported fee of £30 million, potentially rising to £32 million in add-ons. On 5 August, he made his club debut and registered his first assist with the club, in a 2–0 away win against Crystal Palace in the Premier League.

On 18 February 2023, Zinchenko scored his first Arsenal and Premier League goal, which was Arsenal's second in an eventual 4–2 win away over Aston Villa. This result helped Zinchenko's Gunners build their lead at the top of the Premier League. However, Arsenal finished second behind his former club Manchester City, despite being on top for the majority of the 2022–23 season. On 20 September 2023, he played his first Champions League match for Arsenal in a 4–0 win against his former club PSV.

On 12 March 2025, Zinchenko scored his first goal of the 2024–25 season and his first UEFA Champions League goal in the second leg of the round of 16 tie against his former club PSV Eindhoven, which Arsenal won 9–3 on aggregate to advance to the quarter-finals.

==== Nottingham Forest ====
On 1 September 2025, Zinchenko signed for fellow Premier club Nottingham Forest on a season-long loan deal.

=== Ajax ===
On 1 February 2026, Zinchenko signed for Eredivisie club Ajax for the coming six months. He sustained a knee injury during his second match against Fortuna Sittard, which ruled him out for the rest of the season. Later that season, he left the club after his contract expired on 30 June, making him a free agent.

== International career ==
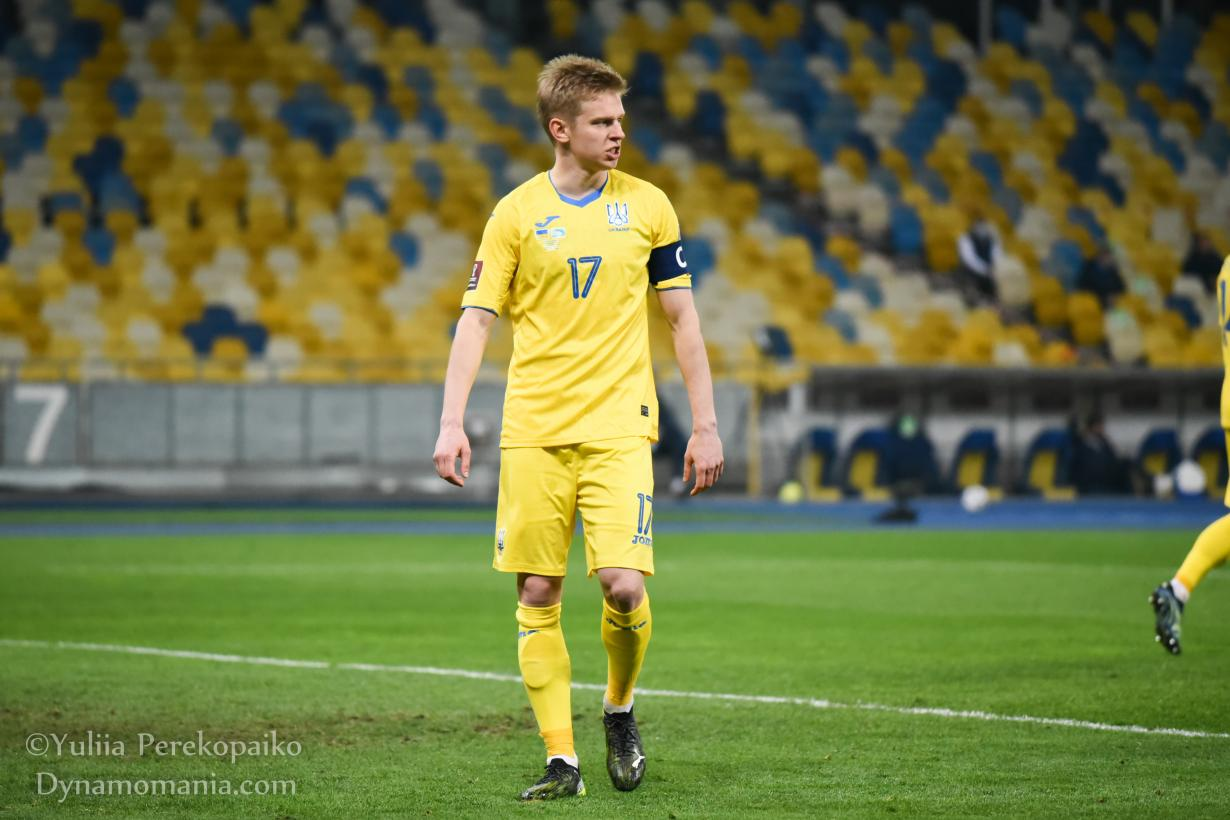
Zinchenko playing for Ukraine in 2021

On 12 October 2015, Zinchenko debuted for Ukraine in a UEFA Euro 2016 qualifying match against Spain. He scored his first international goal in a friendly match against neighbours Romania in Turin, which Ukraine won 4–3 on 29 May 2016. Zinchenko also became Ukraine's youngest player to score an international goal at the age of 19 years and 165 days, beating a record held since 1996 by Andriy Shevchenko. Zinchenko was included in Ukraine's squad for Euro 2016, appearing as a substitute for Viktor Kovalenko in both of Ukraine's first two matches, against Germany and Northern Ireland as Ukraine failed to score and were the first team eliminated.

On 24 March 2021, in a match against France, Zinchenko became Ukraine's youngest captain in their history, aged 24 years and 98 days. Later on, he was included in the squad for the postponed UEFA Euro 2020. On 29 June 2021, he scored the first goal and assisted the second goal in the Euro 2020 round of 16 match against Sweden, which ended in a 2–1 win for Ukraine after extra time, for which he was awarded the Star of the Match.

In May 2024, Zinchenko was called up as one of the 26 players to represent Ukraine at UEFA Euro 2024.

== Personal life ==
In August 2020, Zinchenko married journalist Vlada Sedan. Their first child, a daughter, was born in August 2021. In August 2023, the couple welcomed their second daughter. Zinchenko identifies as an Eastern Orthodox Christian.

He is a vocal opponent of the Russian invasion of Ukraine. On 24 February 2022, he wrote on his Instagram that he wished for Vladimir Putin, the President of Russia, to die the most painful of deaths. The post was later deleted, with Zinchenko claiming Instagram had deleted it rather than him. In October 2023, he expressed solidarity with Israel following the October 7 attacks. In an interview with the BBC in April 2024, Zinchenko expressed his willingness to fight in his home country should he be drafted, and said that he had donated about £1 million to help people affected by the war in Ukraine.

In 2023, Zinchenko founded Passion UA, an esports organisation currently competing in Counter-Strike 2 and Dota 2 and formerly in Apex Legends. Zinchenko would stand-in for his Counter-Strike team in a YaLLa Compass Spring 2024 Contenders match against Bleed Esports on 8 February 2024, ultimately losing the match 2–1. On 24 November 2024 Passion UA upset Astralis to qualify to the Perfect World Shanghai Major 2024. On 19 August 2025 Passion UA would purchase the core of Complexity Gaming's Counter-Strike 2 division following their exit from the scene, becoming a North American based team.

== Career statistics ==
=== Club ===
As of match played 14 February 2026

Appearances and goals by club, season and competition
Club	Season	League			National cup (Note: Includes Russian Cup, FA Cup, KNVB Cup)		League cup (Note: Includes EFL Cup)		Europe		Other		Total	
Club	Season	Division	Apps	Goals	Apps	Goals	Apps	Goals	Apps	Goals	Apps	Goals	Apps	Goals
Ufa	2014–15	Russian Premier League	7	0	0	0	—		—		—		7	0
Ufa	2015–16	Russian Premier League	24	2	2	0	—		—		—		26	2
Ufa	Total		31	2	2	0	—		—		—		33	2
Manchester City	2016–17	Premier League	0	0	—		—		—		—		0	0
Manchester City	2017–18	Premier League	8	0	1	0	4	0	1 (Note: Appearance(s) in UEFA Champions League)	0	—		14	0
Manchester City	2018–19	Premier League	14	0	4	0	6	1	5	0	0	0	29	1
Manchester City	2019–20	Premier League	19	0	1	1	2	0	2	0	1 (Note: Appearance in FA Community Shield)	0	25	1
Manchester City	2020–21	Premier League	20	0	1	0	2	0	9	0	—		32	0
Manchester City	2021–22	Premier League	15	0	4	0	1	0	8	0	0	0	28	0
Manchester City	Total		76	0	11	1	15	1	25	0	1	0	128	2
PSV (loan)	2016–17	Eredivisie	12	0	1	0	—		4	0	—		17	0
Jong PSV (loan)	2016–17	Eerste Divisie	7	0	—		—		—		—		7	0
Arsenal	2022–23	Premier League	27	1	2	0	1	0	3 (Note: Appearances in UEFA Europa League)	0	—		33	1
Arsenal	2023–24	Premier League	27	1	0	0	2	0	6	0	0	0	35	1
Arsenal	2024–25	Premier League	15	0	0	0	2	0	6	1	—		23	1
Arsenal	2025–26	Premier League	0	0	—		—		—		—		0	0
Arsenal	Total		69	2	2	0	5	0	15	1	0	0	91	3
Nottingham Forest (loan)	2025–26	Premier League	5	0	1	0	1	0	3	0	—		10	0
Ajax	2025–26	Eredivisie	2	0	—		—		—		0	0	2	0
Career total			202	4	17	1	21	1	47	1	1	0	288	7

=== International ===
As of match played 9 September 2025

Appearances and goals by national team and year
National team	Year	Apps	Goals
Ukraine	2015	1	0
Ukraine	2016	10	1
Ukraine	2017	2	0
Ukraine	2018	10	1
Ukraine	2019	8	2
Ukraine	2020	4	1
Ukraine	2021	13	3
Ukraine	2022	4	0
Ukraine	2023	6	1
Ukraine	2024	11	1
Ukraine	2025	6	2
Total		75	12

As of match played 10 June 2025
Scores and results list Ukraine's goal tally first, score column indicates score after each Zinchenko goal.

List of international goals scored by Oleksandr Zinchenko
No.	Date	Venue	Cap	Opponent	Score	Result	Competition	Ref.
1	29 May 2016	Stadio Olimpico Grande Torino, Turin, Italy	2	Romania	2–1	4–3	Friendly	
2	6 September 2018	Městský fotbalový stadion, Uherské Hradiště, Czech Republic	18	Czech Republic	2–1	2–1	2018–19 UEFA Nations League B	
3	7 September 2019	LFF Stadium, Vilnius, Lithuania	28	Lithuania	1–0	3–0	UEFA Euro 2020 qualifying	
4	10 September 2019	Dnipro-Arena, Dnipro, Ukraine	29	Nigeria	1–2	2–2	Friendly	
5	3 September 2020	Arena Lviv, Lviv, Ukraine	32	Switzerland	2–1	2–1	2020–21 UEFA Nations League A	
6	7 June 2021	Metalist Stadium, Kharkiv, Ukraine	39	Cyprus	2–0	4–0	Friendly	
7	29 June 2021	Hampden Park, Glasgow, Scotland	43	Sweden	1–0	2–1 (a.e.t.)	UEFA Euro 2020	
8	16 November 2021	Bilino Polje Stadium, Zenica, Bosnia and Herzegovina	48	Bosnia and Herzegovina	1–0	2–0	2022 FIFA World Cup qualification	
9	9 September 2023	Stadion Wrocław, Wrocław, Poland	54	England	1–0	1–1	UEFA Euro 2024 qualifying	
10	19 November 2024	Arena Kombëtare, Tirana, Albania	69	Albania	1–0	2–1	2024–25 UEFA Nations League B	
11	7 June 2025	BMO Field, Toronto, Canada	72	Canada	2–4	2–4	2025 Canadian Shield	
12	10 June 2025	BMO Field, Toronto, Canada	73	New Zealand	2–1	2–1	2025 Canadian Shield	

== Honours ==
Manchester City

- Premier League: 2017–18, 2018–19, 2020–21, 2021–22
- FA Cup: 2018–19
- EFL Cup: 2017–18, 2018–19, 2019–20, 2020–21
- FA Community Shield: 2019
- UEFA Champions League runner-up: 2020–21

Individual

- Ukrainian Footballer of the Year: 2019
