= 2017–18 Manchester City F.C. season =

English football club season

Manchester City
2017–18 season
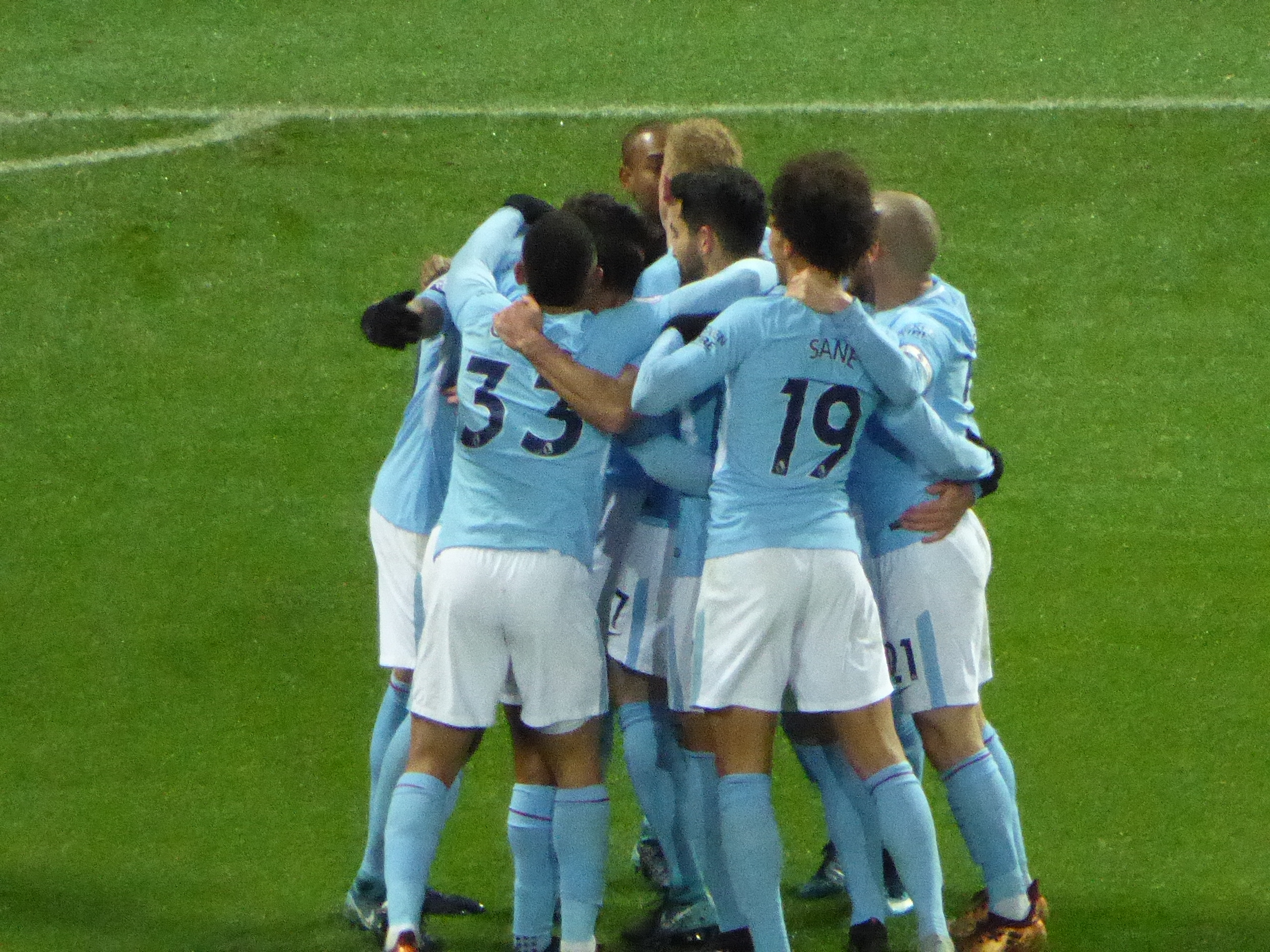
- Manchester City players celebrating a goal against Manchester United in the Premier League, 10 December 2017
- Owner: City Football Group
- Chairman: Khaldoon Al Mubarak
- Manager: Pep Guardiola
- Stadium: Etihad Stadium
- Premier League: 1st
- FA Cup: Fifth round
- EFL Cup: Winners
- UEFA Champions League: Quarter-finals
- Top goalscorer: League: Sergio Agüero (21); All: Sergio Agüero (30)
- Highest home attendance: 54,452 vs. Newcastle United, 20 January 2018, Premier League
- Lowest home attendance: 43,426 vs. Bristol City, 9 January 2018, EFL Cup
Home colours	Away colours	Third colours

The 2017–18 season was Manchester City's 116th season of competitive football, 89th season in the top flight of English football and 21st season in the Premier League. In addition to the league, the club also competed in the FA Cup, EFL Cup and UEFA Champions League.

City won their third Premier League title on 15 April 2018, following West Bromwich Albion's 1–0 away win over second-placed Manchester United, and the EFL Cup on 25 February 2018 with a 3–0 win over Arsenal, the latter being Pep Guardiola's first trophy at City.

The team set a number of Premier League records during the season, including: most points (100), most away points (50), most points ahead of second (19), most wins (32), most away wins (16), most goals (106), best goal difference (+79) and most consecutive victories (18). The team also equalled the record for the earliest Premier League title win (5 games to spare), beating every other team in the league throughout the season, and recording the most consecutive away wins (11). As a result of City setting an English top flight record for most points in a single season (100), the team received the nickname "Centurions", and have been acclaimed by pundits and football journalists as being one of the greatest teams in Premier League history.

== Kits ==
Supplier: Nike / Sponsor: Etihad Airways

Home	Home alt.	Home 2018–19	Away	Third

== Season review ==
On 1 November, Sergio Agüero scored his 178th City goal in a 4–2 Champions League away victory over Napoli to become the club's all-time leading goalscorer, surpassing the former highest total set by Eric Brook.

On 25 February, City won their first silverware of the Guardiola era, defeating Arsenal 3–0 at Wembley Stadium to win the 2017–18 EFL Cup.

On 15 April, City were confirmed as Premier League champions following Manchester United's 0–1 home defeat to West Bromwich Albion. This was the club's third Premier League title and fifth English top flight title and also completed their second league and League Cup double in four years.

City broke and set several new club and English football records during their 2017–18 campaign:

- New national records for consecutive away (11) and overall victories (20) in all competitions; and for consecutive league wins (18)
- New Premier League records for most points (100); most goals scored (106); total wins achieved (32) in a single season; largest winning margin (19 pts); largest goal difference (+79); away games won in a season (16); away points won in a season (50 pts); and the youngest ever Premier League winner (Phil Foden, aged 17 years and 350 days)
- Equalled the Premier League record for consecutive away league wins (11)
- New club records for consecutive games unbeaten in all competitions (28); consecutive games unbeaten in the league (30); consecutive home wins in all competitions (20); and fewest goals conceded in a fully played season (non-war) (27)

The 2017–18 season was an undoubted success for the Blues domestically, but their European campaign was quite underwhelming. The team confidently won five games at the group stage and qualified for the knockout stage, where it defeated FC Basel. The Cityzens were drawn with fellow Premier League side Liverpool in the quarter-finals. The outcome of those games was a disappointing result as Manchester City were beaten 5–1 on aggregate and eliminated amid the controversy with refereeing mistakes favourable to Liverpool.

An Amazon Original docuseries of the season titled All or Nothing: Manchester City was released on Amazon Video on 17 August 2018.

== Pre-season and friendlies ==
On 16 May 2017, Manchester City announced they would face Manchester United as part of the 2017 International Champions Cup. Matches against Tottenham Hotspur and Real Madrid were also confirmed as part of the same tournament. A standalone pre-season friendly against West Ham United then took place in Iceland. A friendly was also scheduled against partner club Girona to take place after the first match of the Premier League season.

=== International Champions Cup ===
20 July 2017 2017 ICC	Manchester United	2–0	Manchester City	Houston, United States
20:30 CDT	Lukaku 37'; Rashford 39'; Blind (yellow card) 45'	Report	Touré (yellow card) 42'; Mangala (yellow card) 55'	Stadium: NRG Stadium; Attendance: 67,401; Referee: Ismail Elfath (United States)

26 July 2017 2017 ICC	Real Madrid	1–4	Manchester City	Los Angeles, United States
20:00 PDT	Nacho (yellow card) 33'; Carvajal (yellow card) 41'; Óscar 90'	Report	Touré (yellow card) 42'; Otamendi 52'; Sterling 59'; Stones 67'; Brahim 82'; Nasri (yellow card) 88'	Stadium: Los Angeles Memorial Coliseum; Attendance: 93,098; Referee: Baldomero Toledo (United States)

29 July 2017 2017 ICC	Manchester City	3–0	Tottenham Hotspur	Nashville, United States
17:00 CDT	Stones 10'; Kompany (yellow card) 55'; Sterling 72'; Brahim 90+1'	Report		Stadium: Nissan Stadium; Attendance: 56,232; Referee: Fotis Bazakos (United States)

=== Super Match ===
4 August 2017 2017 Super Match	Manchester City	3–0	West Ham United	Reykjavík, Iceland
14:00 WET	Gabriel Jesus 8'; Agüero 56'; Sterling 71'	Report		Stadium: Laugardalsvöllur; Attendance: 6,237; Referee: Thoroddur Hjaltalin (Iceland)

=== Costa Brava Trophy ===
15 August 2017 2017 Costa Brava Trophy	Girona	1–0	Manchester City	Girona, Spain
18:00 WET	Portu 13'; García (yellow card) 62'	Report	B. Silva (yellow card) 73'	Stadium: Estadi Montilivi; Attendance: 10,235; Referee: David Medié Jiménez (Spain)

== Competitions ==
=== Premier League ===
==== League table ====
Pos	Team	Pld	W	D	L	GF	GA	GD	Pts	Qualification or relegation
1	Manchester City (C)	38	32	4	2	106	27	+79	100	Qualification for the Champions League group stage
2	Manchester United	38	25	6	7	68	28	+40	81	Qualification for the Champions League group stage
3	Tottenham Hotspur	38	23	8	7	74	36	+38	77	Qualification for the Champions League group stage
4	Liverpool	38	21	12	5	84	38	+46	75	Qualification for the Champions League group stage
5	Chelsea	38	21	7	10	62	38	+24	70	Qualification for the Europa League group stage (Note: Since the winners of the 2017–18 FA Cup (Chelsea) and the winners of the 2017–18 EFL Cup (Manchester City) both qualified for European competition based on their league positions, the berths awarded to the 5th-placed team (Europa League group stage) and the League Cup winners (Europa League second qualifying round) were passed down the league.)

Source: Premier League
Rules for classification: 1) Points; 2) Goal difference; 3) Goals scored. 4) Play-offs (only if needed to decide champion, teams for relegation or teams for UEFA competitions).
(C) Champions

==== Results summary ====
Overall								Home						Away					
Pld	W	D	L	GF	GA	GD	Pts	W	D	L	GF	GA	GD	W	D	L	GF	GA	GD
38	32	4	2	106	27	+79	100	16	2	1	61	14	+47	16	2	1	45	13	+32

Last updated: 13 May 2018.
Source: Premier League

==== Results by matchday ====
Matchday	1	2	3	4	5	6	7	8	9	10	11	12	13	14	15	16	17	18	19	20	21	22	23	24	25	26	27	28	29	30	31	32	33	34	35	36	37	38
Ground	A	H	A	H	A	H	A	H	H	A	H	A	A	H	H	A	A	H	H	A	A	H	A	H	H	A	H	A	H	A	A	H	A	H	A	H	H	A
Result	W	D	W	W	W	W	W	W	W	W	W	W	W	W	W	W	W	W	W	W	D	W	L	W	W	D	W	W	W	W	W	L	W	W	W	D	W	W
Position	3	4	2	2	1	1	1	1	1	1	1	1	1	1	1	1	1	1	1	1	1	1	1	1	1	1	1	1	1	1	1	1	1	1	1	1	1	1
Points	3	4	7	10	13	16	19	22	25	28	31	34	37	40	43	46	49	52	55	58	59	62	62	65	68	69	72	75	78	81	84	84	87	90	93	94	97	100

Updated to match(es) played on 13 May 2018. Source: 11v11
A = Away; H = Home; W = Win; D = Draw; L = Loss

==== Matches ====
On 14 June 2017, Manchester City's Premier League fixtures were announced.

12 August 2017 1	Brighton & Hove Albion	0–2	Manchester City	Falmer
17:30 BST		Report	Gabriel Jesus (yellow card) 29'; Agüero 70'; Dunk 75' (o.g.); Sterling (yellow card) 82'	Stadium: Falmer Stadium; Attendance: 30,415; Referee: Michael Oliver

21 August 2017 2	Manchester City	1–1	Everton	Manchester
20:00 BST	Walker (yellow card) 42' (yellow-red card) 44'; Kompany (yellow card) 78'; Sterling 82'	Report	Schneiderlin (yellow card) 7' (yellow-red card) 88'; Davies (yellow card) 24'; Rooney 35', (yellow card) 84'	Stadium: City of Manchester Stadium; Attendance: 54,009; Referee: Robert Madley

26 August 2017 3	Bournemouth	1–2	Manchester City	Boscombe
12:30 BST	Daniels 13'; Aké (yellow card) 23'; S. Cook (yellow card) 75'; Arter (yellow card) 85'; A. Smith (yellow card) 90+5'	Report	Gabriel Jesus 21'; Kompany (yellow card) 56'; D. Silva (yellow card) 56'; Otamendi (yellow card) 67'; Mendy (yellow card) 79'; Sterling (yellow card) 90+3' (yellow-red card) 90+9', (goal) 90+7'	Stadium: Dean Court; Attendance: 10,419; Referee: Mike Dean

9 September 2017 4	Manchester City	5–0	Liverpool	Manchester
12:30 BST	Otamendi (yellow card) 6'; Agüero 24'; Fernandinho (yellow card) 28'; Gabriel Jesus 45+6', 53'; Sané 77', 90+1'	Report	Alexander-Arnold (yellow card) 19'; Mané (red card) 37'; Can (yellow card) 80'	Stadium: City of Manchester Stadium; Attendance: 54,172; Referee: Jon Moss

16 September 2017 5	Watford	0–6	Manchester City	Watford
15:00 BST	Holebas (yellow card) 29'; Doucouré (yellow card) 40'	Report	Agüero 27', 31', 81'; Gabriel Jesus 38'; Otamendi 63'; Sterling 89' (pen.)	Stadium: Vicarage Road; Attendance: 20,305; Referee: Anthony Taylor

23 September 2017 6	Manchester City	5–0	Crystal Palace	Manchester
15:00 BST	Mendy (yellow card) 25'; Sané 44', (yellow card) 75'; Sterling 51', 59'; Danilo (yellow card) 56'; Agüero 79'; Delph 89'	Report	Schlupp (yellow card) 76'	Stadium: City of Manchester Stadium; Attendance: 53,526; Referee: Neil Swarbrick

30 September 2017 7	Chelsea	0–1	Manchester City	Fulham, London
17:30 BST		Report	Fernandinho (yellow card) 61'; De Bruyne 67'; Otamendi (yellow card) 89'	Stadium: Stamford Bridge; Attendance: 41,530; Referee: Martin Atkinson

14 October 2017 8	Manchester City	7–2	Stoke City	Manchester
15:00 BST	Gabriel Jesus 17', 55'; Sterling 19'; D. Silva 27'; Fernandinho 60'; Sané 62'; B. Silva 79'	Report	Diouf 44'; Walker 47' (o.g.); Afellay (yellow card) 90+2'	Stadium: City of Manchester Stadium; Attendance: 54,128; Referee: Craig Pawson

21 October 2017 9	Manchester City	3–0	Burnley	Manchester
15:00 BST	Sané (yellow card) 29', (goal) 75'; Agüero 30' (pen.); Fernandinho (yellow card) 44'; Otamendi 73'	Report	Tarkowski (yellow card) 29'; Cork (yellow card) 52'; Barnes (yellow card) 57'	Stadium: City of Manchester Stadium; Attendance: 54,118; Referee: Roger East

28 October 2017 10	West Bromwich Albion	2–3	Manchester City	West Bromwich
15:00 BST	Rodriguez 13'; Evans (yellow card) 21'; Hegazi (yellow card) 72'; Phillips 90+2'	Report	Sané 10'; Fernandinho 15'; Gabriel Jesus (yellow card) 60'; Sterling 64'; Otamendi (yellow card) 71'; Walker (yellow card) 90+4'	Stadium: The Hawthorns; Attendance: 24,003; Referee: Mike Jones

5 November 2017 11	Manchester City	3–1	Arsenal	Manchester
14:15 GMT	De Bruyne 19'; Agüero 50' (pen.); Otamendi (yellow card) 73'; Gabriel Jesus 74'	Report	Monreal (yellow card) 49'; Lacazette (yellow card) 59', (goal) 65'; Koscielny (yellow card) 67'; Xhaka (yellow card) 75'; Sánchez (yellow card) 77'; Özil (yellow card) 90+1'	Stadium: City of Manchester Stadium; Attendance: 54,286; Referee: Michael Oliver

18 November 2017 12	Leicester City	0–2	Manchester City	Leicester
15:00 GMT	Maguire (yellow card) 83'	Report	Kompany (yellow card) 3'; Gabriel Jesus 45'; De Bruyne 49'	Stadium: King Power Stadium; Attendance: 31,908; Referee: Graham Scott

26 November 2017 13	Huddersfield Town	1–2	Manchester City	Huddersfield
16:00 GMT	Otamendi 45+1' (o.g.); Hogg (yellow card) 56'; Malone (yellow card) 64'; Van La Parra (red card) 90+6'	Report	Agüero 47' (pen.); Fernandinho (yellow card) 63'; Sterling 84'; D. Silva (yellow card) 86'; Sané (yellow card) 90+6'	Stadium: Kirklees Stadium; Attendance: 24,121; Referee: Craig Pawson

29 November 2017 14	Manchester City	2–1	Southampton	Manchester
20:00 GMT	Kompany (yellow card) 36'; De Bruyne 47'; Sterling 90+6'	Report	Long (yellow card) 66'; Romeu 75'	Stadium: City of Manchester Stadium; Attendance: 53,407; Referee: Paul Tierney

3 December 2017 15	Manchester City	2–1	West Ham United	Manchester
16:00 GMT	Otamendi 57'; De Bruyne (yellow card) 59'; D. Silva 83'; Gabriel Jesus (yellow card) 90+5'	Report	Rice (yellow card) 17'; Ogbonna 44'; Adrián (yellow card) 90+4'	Stadium: City of Manchester Stadium; Attendance: 54,203; Referee: Mike Dean

10 December 2017 16	Manchester United	1–2	Manchester City	Trafford
16:30 GMT	Rojo (yellow card) 36'; Rashford 45+2', (yellow card) 63'; Herrera (yellow card) 79'; Young (yellow card) 90'	Report	Walker (yellow card) 4'; D. Silva 43', (yellow card) 73'; Otamendi 54'	Stadium: Old Trafford; Attendance: 74,847; Referee: Michael Oliver

13 December 2017 17	Swansea City	0–4	Manchester City	Swansea
19:45 GMT		Report	D. Silva 27', 52'; De Bruyne 34'; Agüero 85'	Stadium: Liberty Stadium; Attendance: 20,870; Referee: Anthony Taylor

16 December 2017 18	Manchester City	4–1	Tottenham Hotspur	Manchester
17:30 GMT	Gündoğan 14'; Otamendi (yellow card) 38'; Delph (yellow card) 51'; De Bruyne 70'; Sterling 80', 90'	Report	Kane (yellow card) 52'; Dembélé (yellow card) 62'; Alli (yellow card) 68'; Sissoko (yellow card) 90+1'; Eriksen 90+3'	Stadium: City of Manchester Stadium; Attendance: 54,214; Referee: Craig Pawson

23 December 2017 19	Manchester City	4–0	Bournemouth	Manchester
15:00 GMT	Agüero 27', 79'; Sterling 53'; Danilo 85'	Report	A. Smith (yellow card) 63'	Stadium: City of Manchester Stadium; Attendance: 54,270; Referee: Mike Jones

27 December 2017 20	Newcastle United	0–1	Manchester City	Newcastle upon Tyne
19:45 GMT	Gayle (yellow card) 75'	Report	Sterling 31'	Stadium: St James' Park; Attendance: 52,311; Referee: Andre Marriner

31 December 2017 21	Crystal Palace	0–0	Manchester City	Selhurst, London
12:00 GMT	Dann (yellow card) 16'; Van Aanholt (yellow card) 48'; Cabaye (yellow card) 67'; Kelly (yellow card) 90+2'; Puncheon (yellow card) 90+3'	Report	Sané (yellow card) 45+6'; Agüero (yellow card) 79'; Touré (yellow card) 90'; Fernandinho (yellow card) 90+1'	Stadium: Selhurst Park; Attendance: 25,804; Referee: Jon Moss

2 January 2018 22	Manchester City	3–1	Watford	Manchester
20:00 GMT	Sterling 1'; Kabasele 13' (o.g.); D. Silva (yellow card) 24'; Agüero 63'	Report	Gray 82'; Pereyra (yellow card) 83'	Stadium: City of Manchester Stadium; Attendance: 53,556; Referee: Lee Mason

14 January 2018 23	Liverpool	4–3	Manchester City	Liverpool
16:00 GMT	Oxlade-Chamberlain 9'; Firmino 59', (yellow card) 60'; Mané 61'; Salah 68'; Milner (yellow card) 90+3'	Report	Sané 40'; Otamendi (yellow card) 65'; Sterling (yellow card) 69'; Fernandinho (yellow card) 72'; B. Silva 84'; Gündoğan 90+1'	Stadium: Anfield; Attendance: 53,285; Referee: Andre Marriner

20 January 2018 24	Manchester City	3–1	Newcastle United	Manchester
17:30 GMT	Agüero 34', 63' (pen.), 83'	Report	Murphy 67'; Clark (yellow card) 78'	Stadium: City of Manchester Stadium; Attendance: 54,452; Referee: Paul Tierney

31 January 2018 25	Manchester City	3–0	West Bromwich Albion	Manchester
20:00 GMT	Fernandinho 19'; D. Silva (yellow card) 32'; De Bruyne 68'; Agüero 89'	Report	McClean (yellow card) 69'; Rondón (yellow card) 75'; Phillips (yellow card) 85'	Stadium: City of Manchester Stadium; Attendance: 53,241; Referee: Bobby Madley

3 February 2018 26	Burnley	1–1	Manchester City	Burnley
12:30 GMT	Long (yellow card) 38'; Cork (yellow card) 42'; Mee (yellow card) 73'; Guðmundsson 82'; Barnes (yellow card) 90+3'	Report	Danilo 22'; Gündoğan (yellow card) 64'	Stadium: Turf Moor; Attendance: 21,658; Referee: Martin Atkinson

10 February 2018 27	Manchester City	5–1	Leicester City	Manchester
17:30 GMT	Sterling 3'; Agüero 48', 53', 77', 90'; Gündoğan (yellow card) 73'; Laporte (yellow card) 83'	Report	Vardy 24', (yellow card) 83'; Ndidi (yellow card) 71'; Maguire (yellow card) 89'	Stadium: City of Manchester Stadium; Attendance: 54,416; Referee: Mike Jones

1 March 2018 28	Arsenal	0–3	Manchester City	Holloway, London
19:45 GMT	Kolašinac (yellow card) 32'	Report	B. Silva 15'; Otamendi (yellow card) 19'; D. Silva 28'; Sané 33'	Stadium: Emirates Stadium; Attendance: 58,420; Referee: Andre Marriner

4 March 2018 29	Manchester City	1–0	Chelsea	Manchester
16:00 GMT	Zinchenko (yellow card) 24'; B. Silva 46'; Gündoğan (yellow card) 47'	Report	Rüdiger (yellow card) 57'	Stadium: City of Manchester Stadium; Attendance: 54,328; Referee: Michael Oliver

12 March 2018 30	Stoke City	0–2	Manchester City	Stoke-on-Trent
20:00 GMT	Allen (yellow card) 73'	Report	D. Silva 10', 50'	Stadium: bet365 Stadium; Attendance: 29,138; Referee: Jon Moss

31 March 2018 31	Everton	1–3	Manchester City	Liverpool
17:30 BST	Bolasie 63'	Report	Sané 4'; Gabriel Jesus 12'; Sterling 37'	Stadium: Goodison Park; Attendance: 39,221; Referee: Paul Tierney

7 April 2018 32	Manchester City	2–3	Manchester United	Manchester
17:30 BST	Kompany 25', (yellow card) 90+2'; Gündoğan 30'; Sterling (yellow card) 63'; Fernandinho (yellow card) 79'; Agüero (yellow card) 79'; Danilo (yellow card) 90+1'; Gabriel Jesus (yellow card) 90+3'	Report	Herrera (yellow card) 37'; Lukaku (yellow card) 45'; Pogba 53', 55', (yellow card) 81'; Smalling 69'	Stadium: City of Manchester Stadium; Attendance: 54,259; Referee: Martin Atkinson

14 April 2018 33	Tottenham Hotspur	1–3	Manchester City	Wembley, London
19:45 BST	Lloris (yellow card) 24'; Davies (yellow card) 27'; Eriksen 42'; Dembélé (yellow card) 70'	Report	Gabriel Jesus 22', (yellow card) 45+1'; Gündoğan 25' (pen.); De Bruyne (yellow card) 41'; Kompany (yellow card) 66'; Sterling 72'; Delph (yellow card) 77'	Stadium: Wembley Stadium; Attendance: 80,811; Referee: Jon Moss

22 April 2018 34	Manchester City	5–0	Swansea City	Manchester
16:30 BST	D. Silva 12'; Sterling 16'; De Bruyne 54'; B. Silva 64'; Gabriel Jesus 88'	Report	Olsson (yellow card) 40'	Stadium: City of Manchester Stadium; Attendance: 54,387; Referee: Craig Pawson

29 April 2018 35	West Ham United	1–4	Manchester City	Stratford, London
14:15 BST	Cresswell 42'	Report	Sané 13'; Zabaleta 27' (o.g.); Otamendi (yellow card) 37'; Gabriel Jesus 53'; Fernandinho 64'	Stadium: London Stadium; Attendance: 56,904; Referee: Neil Swarbrick

6 May 2018 36	Manchester City	0–0	Huddersfield Town	Manchester
13:30 BST		Report	Smith (yellow card) 66'; Löwe (yellow card) 76'; Van La Parra (yellow card) 87'	Stadium: City of Manchester Stadium; Referee: Mike Dean

9 May 2018 37	Manchester City	3–1	Brighton & Hove Albion	Manchester
20:00 BST	Danilo 16'; B. Silva 34'; Fernandinho 72'	Report	Ulloa 20'; Duffy (yellow card) 37'	Stadium: City of Manchester Stadium; Attendance: 54,013; Referee: Paul Tierney

13 May 2018 38	Southampton	0–1	Manchester City	Southampton
15:00 BST	Ward-Prowse (yellow card) 71'; Cédric (yellow card) 90+1'; Højbjerg (yellow card) 90+1'	Report	Gabriel Jesus 90+4', (yellow card) 90+4'; Ederson (yellow card) 90+4'	Stadium: St Mary's Stadium; Attendance: 31,882; Referee: Andre Marriner

=== FA Cup ===
Manchester City entered the competition in the third round and were drawn at home to Burnley. They were handed an away tie against Cardiff City in the fourth round proper. In the fifth round, City were drawn away to Wigan Athletic.

6 January 2018 Third round	Manchester City	4–1	Burnley	Manchester
15:00 GMT	Danilo (yellow card) 49'; Agüero 56', 58'; Sané 71'; B. Silva 82'	Report	Barnes 25'; Westwood (yellow card) 57'; Cork (yellow card) 69'	Stadium: City of Manchester Stadium; Attendance: 53,285; Referee: Graham Scott

28 January 2018 Fourth round	Cardiff City	0–2	Manchester City	Cardiff
16:00 GMT	Bennett (yellow card) 45' (yellow-red card) 90+2'; Manga (yellow card) 77'	Report	De Bruyne 8'; Sterling 37'; Fernandinho (yellow card) 80'	Stadium: Cardiff City Stadium; Attendance: 32,339; Referee: Lee Mason

19 February 2018 Fifth round	Wigan Athletic	1–0	Manchester City	Wigan
19:55 GMT	Massey (yellow card) 59'; Fulton (yellow card) 69'; Elder (yellow card) 71'; Grigg 79'; Walton (yellow card) 84'; Power (yellow card) 90'	Report	Delph (red card) 45+2'	Stadium: DW Stadium; Attendance: 19,242; Referee: Anthony Taylor

=== EFL Cup ===
Manchester City entered the competition in the third round and were drawn away to West Bromwich Albion. A home tie against Wolverhampton Wanderers was confirmed for the fourth round. The Blues were handed an away tie against Leicester City in the quarter-finals. In the two-legged semi-finals, they were drawn against Bristol City as the home team, thus hosting the first leg and playing the second one on the road at Bristol.

20 September 2017 Third round	West Bromwich Albion	1–2	Manchester City	West Bromwich
20:00 BST	Yacob (yellow card) 54', (goal) 72'	Report	Sané 3', 77', (yellow card) 59'; Delph (yellow card) 45'; Sterling (yellow card) 66'; Danilo (yellow card) 85'	Stadium: The Hawthorns; Attendance: 14,953; Referee: Mike Jones

24 October 2017 Fourth round	Manchester City	0–0 (a.e.t.) (4–1 p)	Wolverhampton Wanderers	Manchester
20:00 BST	Touré (yellow card) 92'	Report	Price (yellow card) 82'; Bennett (yellow card) 84'	Stadium: City of Manchester Stadium; Attendance: 50,755; Referee: Kevin Friend
	Penalties
	De Bruyne (penalty scored); Touré (penalty scored); Sané (penalty scored); Agüero (penalty scored)		(penalty scored) Bonatini; (penalty missed) N'Diaye; (penalty missed) Coady

19 December 2017 Quarter-finals	Leicester City	1–1 (a.e.t.) (3–4 p)	Manchester City	Leicester
19:45 GMT	Iheanacho (yellow card) 23'; Vardy 90+7' (pen.); Maguire (yellow card) 105'	Report	B. Silva 26'; Gündoğan (yellow card) 61'; Danilo (yellow card) 90+6'; Walker (yellow card) 96'	Stadium: King Power Stadium; Attendance: 31,562; Referee: Bobby Madley
	Penalties
	Fuchs (penalty scored); Maguire (penalty scored); Iborra (penalty scored); Vardy (penalty missed); Mahrez (penalty missed)		(penalty scored) Gündoğan; (penalty scored) Touré; (penalty scored) Nmecha; (penalty scored) Gabriel Jesus

9 January 2018 Semi-finals 1st leg	Manchester City	2–1	Bristol City	Manchester
19:45 GMT	De Bruyne 55'; Agüero 90+2'	Report	Reid 44' (pen.); Flint (yellow card) 56'; Smith (yellow card) 58'; Bryan (yellow card) 60'	Stadium: City of Manchester Stadium; Attendance: 43,426; Referee: Anthony Taylor

23 January 2018 Semi-finals 2nd leg	Bristol City	2–3 (3–5 agg.)	Manchester City	Bristol
19:45 GMT	Pack 64'; Flint 90+4'	Report	Fernandinho (yellow card) 21'; Sané 43'; Agüero 49'; D. Silva (yellow card) 90+5'; De Bruyne 90+6'	Stadium: Ashton Gate Stadium; Attendance: 26,003; Referee: Graham Scott

25 February 2018 Final	Arsenal	0–3	Manchester City	Wembley
16:30 GMT	Bellerín (yellow card) 24'; Ramsey (yellow card) 32'; Chambers (yellow card) 47'; Wilshere (yellow card) 88'	Report	Agüero 18'; Fernandinho (yellow card) 36'; Kompany 58', (yellow card) 80'; D. Silva 65'	Stadium: Wembley Stadium; Attendance: 85,671; Referee: Craig Pawson

=== UEFA Champions League ===
On 24 August 2017, Manchester City were drawn into Group F alongside Shakhtar Donetsk, Napoli and Feyenoord. The Blues topped their group and were then paired with Basel from the Swiss Super League in round of 16 two-legged tie.

==== Group stage ====
Pos	Team	Pld	W	D	L	GF	GA	GD	Pts	Qualification	MCI	SHK	NAP	FEY
1	(England) Manchester City	6	5	0	1	14	5	+9	15	Advance to knockout phase	—	2–0	2–1	1–0
2	(Ukraine) Shakhtar Donetsk	6	4	0	2	9	9	0	12	Advance to knockout phase	2–1	—	2–1	3–1
3	(Italy) Napoli	6	2	0	4	11	11	0	6	Transfer to Europa League	2–4	3–0	—	3–1
4	(Netherlands) Feyenoord	6	1	0	5	5	14	−9	3		0–4	1–2	2–1	—

Source: UEFA
Rules for classification: Group stage tiebreakers

13 September 2017 1	Feyenoord (Netherlands)	0–4	(England) Manchester City	Rotterdam, Netherlands
19:45 BST	St. Juste (yellow card) 38'; Kramer (yellow card) 40'; Vilhena (yellow card) 41'; Botteghin (yellow card) 66'	Report	Stones 2', 63'; Agüero 10'; De Bruyne (yellow card) 15'; Gabriel Jesus 25'	Stadium: De Kuip; Attendance: 43,500; Referee: Szymon Marciniak (Poland)

26 September 2017 2	Manchester City (England)	2–0	(Ukraine) Shakhtar Donetsk	Manchester, England
19:45 BST	De Bruyne 48'; Sterling 90'	Report	Ordets (yellow card) 66'	Stadium: City of Manchester Stadium; Attendance: 45,310; Referee: Jorge Sousa (Portugal)

17 October 2017 3	Manchester City (England)	2–1	(Italy) Napoli	Manchester, England
19:45 BST	Sterling 9'; Gabriel Jesus 13'; Walker (yellow card) 37'; De Bruyne (yellow card) 44'; Fernandinho (yellow card) 72'	Report	Mertens (penalty missed) 38'; Diawara 73' (pen.); Albiol (yellow card) 74'; Maggio (yellow card) 79'	Stadium: City of Manchester Stadium; Attendance: 48,520; Referee: Antonio Mateu Lahoz (Spain)

1 November 2017 4	Napoli (Italy)	2–4	(England) Manchester City	Naples, Italy
19:45 GMT	Insigne 21'; Jorginho 62' (pen.); Mertens (yellow card) 90+4'; Koulibaly (yellow card) 90+4'	Report	Otamendi 34', (yellow card) 90+1'; Stones 48'; Agüero 69'; Sterling 90+2'	Stadium: Stadio San Paolo; Attendance: 44,483; Referee: Felix Brych (Germany)

21 November 2017 5	Manchester City (England)	1–0	(Netherlands) Feyenoord	Manchester, England
19:45 GMT	Mangala (yellow card) 59'; De Bruyne (yellow card) 60'; Danilo (yellow card) 86'; Sterling 88'	Report	Vilhena (yellow card) 56'; Jones (yellow card) 74'; Toornstra (yellow card) 79'	Stadium: City of Manchester Stadium; Attendance: 43,548; Referee: Ivan Kružliak (Slovakia)

6 December 2017 6	Shakhtar Donetsk (Ukraine)	2–1	(England) Manchester City	Kharkiv, Ukraine
19:45 GMT	Bernard 26'; Ismaily 32'; Rakitskiy (yellow card) 54'	Report	Danilo (yellow card) 22'; Gündoğan (yellow card) 57'; Agüero 90+2' (pen.)	Stadium: Metalist Stadium (Note: Shakhtar Donetsk played their home matches at Metalist Stadium, Kharkiv, instead of their regular stadium Donbass Arena, Donetsk, due to the war conditions in Eastern Ukraine.); Attendance: 33,154; Referee: Benoît Bastien (France)

==== Knockout phase ====
===== Round of 16 =====
13 February 2018 First leg	Basel (Switzerland)	0–4	(England) Manchester City	Basel, Switzerland
20:45 CET	Xhaka (yellow card) 38'; Dié (yellow card) 89'	Report	Gündoğan 14', 53', (yellow card) 89'; B. Silva 18'; Agüero 23'; Fernandinho (yellow card) 59'	Stadium: St. Jakob-Park; Attendance: 36,000; Referee: Jonas Eriksson (Sweden)

7 March 2018 Second leg	Manchester City (England)	1–2 (5–2 agg.)	(Switzerland) Basel	Manchester, England
20:45 CET	Gabriel Jesus 8', (yellow card) 77'	Report	Elyounoussi 17'; Lacroix (yellow card) 44'; Lang 72'	Stadium: City of Manchester Stadium; Attendance: 49,411; Referee: Pavel Královec (Czech Republic)

===== Quarter-finals =====
4 April 2018 First leg	Liverpool (England)	3–0	(England) Manchester City	Liverpool, England
19:45 BST	Salah 12'; Oxlade-Chamberlain 21'; Mané 31'; Henderson (yellow card) 86'	Report	Otamendi (yellow card) 45+3'; Gabriel Jesus (yellow card) 76'; De Bruyne (yellow card) 80'; Sterling (yellow card) 90+3'	Stadium: Anfield; Attendance: 50,685; Referee: Felix Brych (Germany)

10 April 2018 Second leg	Manchester City (England)	1–2 (1–5 agg.)	(England) Liverpool	Manchester, England
19:45 BST	Gabriel Jesus 2'; Ederson (yellow card) 14'; B. Silva (yellow card) 30'	Report	Mané (yellow card) 14'; Alexander-Arnold (yellow card) 29'; Firmino (yellow card) 35', (goal) 77'; Salah 56'; Van Dijk (yellow card) 65'	Stadium: City of Manchester Stadium; Attendance: 53,461; Referee: Antonio Mateu Lahoz (Spain)
Note: Manchester City manager Pep Guardiola was ejected at half-time for protesting refereeing decisions.

== Squad information ==
=== First team squad ===
N	Pos.	Nat.	Name	Age	EU	Since	App	Goals	Ends	Transfer fee	Notes
1	GK	(Chile)	Claudio Bravo	35	Non-EU	2016	43	0	2020	£15.4M	Second nationality: Spain
2	RB	(England)	Kyle Walker	27	EU	2017	48	0	2022	£45M	
3	RB	(Brazil)	Danilo	26	Non-EU	2017	38	3	2022	£26.5M	
4	CB	(Belgium)	Vincent Kompany (captain)	32	EU	2008	334	19	2019	£6M	
5	CB	(England)	John Stones	23	EU	2016	67	5	2022	£47.5M	
7	RW	(England)	Raheem Sterling	23	EU	2015	140	44	2020	£44M	
8	CM	(Germany)	İlkay Gündoğan	27	EU	2016	64	11	2020	£20M	
10	ST	(Argentina)	Sergio Agüero	29	EU	2011	292	199	2020	£31.5M	Leading all time goalscorer for the club
14	CB	(France)	Aymeric Laporte	23	EU	2018	13	0	2023	£57M	Record signing
15	CB	(France)	Eliaquim Mangala	27	EU	2014	79	0	2019	£42M	Loaned out to Everton on 31 January 2018
17	AM	(Belgium)	Kevin De Bruyne	26	EU	2015	142	35	2023	£54.5M	
18	CM	(England)	Fabian Delph	28	EU	2015	69	5	2020	£8M	
19	LW	(Germany)	Leroy Sané	22	EU	2016	86	23	2021	£37M	
20	RM	(Portugal)	Bernardo Silva	23	EU	2017	53	9	2022	£43.5M	
21	AM	(Spain)	David Silva	32	EU	2010	346	61	2020	£24M	
22	LB	(France)	Benjamin Mendy	23	EU	2017	8	0	2022	£52M	
24	CB	(England)	Tosin Adarabioyo	20	EU	2016	8	0	2021	Youth system	Academy graduate
25	DM	(Brazil)	Fernandinho	33	Non-EU	2013	230	22	2020	£30M	
30	CB	(Argentina)	Nicolás Otamendi	30	Non-EU	2015	136	7	2022	£28M	
31	GK	(Brazil)	Ederson	24	EU	2017	45	0	2025	£34.9M	Second nationality: Portugal
33	ST	(Brazil)	Gabriel Jesus	21	Non-EU	2017	53	24	2021	£27M	
35	AM	(Ukraine)	Oleksandr Zinchenko	21	Non-EU	2016	14	0	2021	£1.7M	
42	CM	(Ivory Coast)	Yaya Touré	35	Non-EU	2010	316	82	2018	£24M	
43	FW	(England)	Lukas Nmecha	19	EU	2017	3	0	2021	Youth system	Academy graduate
47	AM	(England)	Phil Foden	17	EU	2017	10	0	2020	Youth system	Academy graduate
55	AM	(Spain)	Brahim	18	EU	2016	11	0	2019	£0.2M	Academy graduate

Updated to match played 13 May 2018
Source: mancity.com
Ordered by squad number.
Appearances include league and cup appearances, including as substitute.
Ages are as at the end of the 2017–18 season.

== Statistics ==
=== Squad statistics ===
As of 13 May 2018

Appearances (Apps) numbers are for appearances in competitive games only, including sub appearances.
Red card numbers denote: numbers in parentheses represent red cards overturned for wrongful dismissal.

No.	Nat.	Player	Pos.	Premier League				FA Cup				League Cup				Champions League				Total			
No.	Nat.	Player	Pos.	Apps	Goal	Yellow card	Red card	Apps	Goal	Yellow card	Red card	Apps	Goal	Yellow card	Red card	Apps	Goal	Yellow card	Red card	Apps	Goal	Yellow card	Red card
1	(Chile)	Claudio Bravo	GK	3				3				6				1				13			
2	(England)	Kyle Walker	DF	32		2	1	3				6		1		7		1		48		4	1
3	(Brazil)	Danilo	DF	23	3	2		3		1		6		2		6		2		38	3	7	
4	(Belgium)	Vincent Kompany	DF	17	1	5		1				1	1	1		2				21	2	6	
5	(England)	John Stones	DF	18				2				4				5	3			29	3		
7	(England)	Raheem Sterling	FW	33	18	3	1	2	1			4		1		8	4	1		45	23	5	1
8	(Germany)	İlkay Gündoğan	MF	30	4	3		3				6		1		9	2	2		48	6	6	
10	(Argentina)	Sergio Agüero	FW	25	21	2		3	2			4	3			7	4			39	30	2	
14	(France)	Aymeric Laporte	DF	9		1		1								3				13		1	
15	(France)	Eliaquim Mangala	DF	9								4				2		1		15		1	
17	(Belgium)	Kevin De Bruyne	MF	37	8	2		3	1			4	2			8	1	4		52	12	6	
18	(England)	Fabian Delph	MF	22	1	2		1			1	1		1		5				29	1	3	1
19	(Germany)	Leroy Sané	FW	32	10	4		3	1			5	3	1		9				49	14	5	
20	(Portugal)	Bernardo Silva	MF	35	6			3	1			6	1			9	1	1		53	9	1	
21	(Spain)	David Silva	MF	29	9	5		2				2	1	1		7				40	10	6	
22	(France)	Benjamin Mendy	DF	7		2										1				8		2	
24	(England)	Tosin Adarabioyo	DF									2				2				4			
25	(Brazil)	Fernandinho	MF	34	5	7		3		1		3		2		8		2		48	5	12	
30	(Argentina)	Nicolás Otamendi	DF	34	4	9		2				2				8	1	2		46	5	11	
31	(Brazil)	Ederson	GK	36		1										9		1		45		1	
33	(Brazil)	Gabriel Jesus	FW	29	13	6						4				9	4	2		42	17	8	
35	(Ukraine)	Oleksandr Zinchenko	MF	8		1		1				4				1				14		1	
42	(Ivory Coast)	Yaya Touré	MF	10		1						4		1		3				17		2	
43	(England)	Lukas Nmecha	FW	2								1								3			
47	(England)	Phil Foden	MF	5								2				3				10			
55	(Spain)	Brahim	MF	5				1				1				3				10			
72	(England)	Tom Dele-Bashiru	MF									1								1			
Own goals					3																3		
Totals					106	58	2		6	2	1		11	12	0		20	19	0		143	91	3

=== Goalscorers ===
As of 13 May 2018

Includes all competitive matches. The list is sorted alphabetically by surname when total goals are equal.

No.	Pos.	Player	Premier League	FA Cup	League Cup	Champions League	TOTAL
10	FW	(Argentina) Sergio Agüero	21	2	3	4	30
7	MF	(England) Raheem Sterling	18	1	0	4	23
33	FW	(Brazil) Gabriel Jesus	13	0	0	4	17
19	FW	(Germany) Leroy Sané	10	1	3	0	14
17	MF	(Belgium) Kevin De Bruyne	8	1	2	1	12
21	MF	(Spain) David Silva	9	0	1	0	10
20	MF	(Portugal) Bernardo Silva	6	1	1	1	9
8	MF	(Germany) İlkay Gündoğan	4	0	0	2	6
25	MF	(Brazil) Fernandinho	5	0	0	0	5
30	DF	(Argentina) Nicolás Otamendi	4	0	0	1	5
3	DF	(Brazil) Danilo	3	0	0	0	3
5	DF	(England) John Stones	0	0	0	3	3
4	DF	(Belgium) Vincent Kompany	1	0	1	0	2
18	MF	(England) Fabian Delph	1	0	0	0	1
Own Goals			3	0	0	0	3
Totals			106	6	11	20	143

=== Clean sheets ===
As of match played 13 May 2018

The list is sorted by shirt number when total clean sheets are equal. Numbers in parentheses represent games where both goalkeepers participated and both kept a clean sheet; the number in parentheses is awarded to the goalkeeper who was substituted on, whilst a full clean sheet is awarded to the goalkeeper who was on the field at the start of play.

No.	Player	Premier League	FA Cup	League Cup	Champions League	TOTAL
31	(Brazil) Ederson	17	0	0	4	21
1	(Chile) Claudio Bravo	1 (1)	1	2	0	4 (1)
Totals		18 (1)	1	2	4	25 (1)

== Awards ==
=== Etihad Player of the Month ===
Month	Player
August	(England) Raheem Sterling
September	(Belgium) Kevin De Bruyne
October	(Belgium) Kevin De Bruyne
November	(England) Raheem Sterling
December	(Argentina) Nicolás Otamendi
January	(Belgium) Kevin De Bruyne
February	(Argentina) Sergio Agüero
March	(Spain) David Silva

=== Premier League Player of the Month ===
Month	Player
October	(Germany) Leroy Sané
January	(Argentina) Sergio Agüero

=== Premier League Manager of the Month ===
In December 2017, Pep Guardiola became the first manager in Premier League history to be awarded four consecutive Manager of the Month awards.

Month	Manager
September	(Spain) Pep Guardiola
October	(Spain) Pep Guardiola
November	(Spain) Pep Guardiola
December	(Spain) Pep Guardiola

=== UEFA Team of the Year ===
Year	Player
2017	(Belgium) Kevin De Bruyne

=== BBC Young Sports Personality of the Year ===
Year	Winner
2017	(England) Phil Foden

Won the Golden Ball as the best player at the FIFA U-17 World Cup, helping England win the tournament.

=== Alan Hardaker Trophy ===
Year	Winner
2018	(Belgium) Vincent Kompany

Awarded to the player of the match in the EFL Cup final.

=== PFA Team of the Year ===
Season	Pos.	Player
2017–18
2017–18	DF	(England) Kyle Walker
2017–18	DF	(Argentina) Nicolás Otamendi
2017–18	MF	(Spain) David Silva
2017–18	MF	(Belgium) Kevin De Bruyne
2017–18	FW	(Argentina) Sergio Agüero

=== PFA Young Player of the Year ===
Season	Player
2017–18	(Germany) Leroy Sané

=== Premier League Playmaker of the Season ===
Inaugural award to the Premier League player with the most league assists in the season.

Season	Player	Number of assists
2017–18	(Belgium) Kevin De Bruyne	16

=== Premier League Manager of the Season ===
Season	Manager
2017–18	(Spain) Pep Guardiola

=== LMA Manager of the Year ===
Season	Manager
2017–18	(Spain) Pep Guardiola

=== Etihad Player of the Season ===
Manchester City's player of the season.

Season	Player
2017–18	(Belgium) Kevin De Bruyne

== Transfers and loans ==
=== Transfers in ===
First Team
Date	Position	No.	Player	From club	Transfer fee
1 July 2017	MF	20	(Portugal) Bernardo Silva	(France) Monaco	£43,000,000
1 July 2017	GK	31	(Brazil) Ederson	(Portugal) Benfica	£34,900,000
14 July 2017	DF	2	(England) Kyle Walker	(England) Tottenham Hotspur	£45,000,000
23 July 2017	DF	3	(Brazil) Danilo	(Spain) Real Madrid	£26,500,000
24 July 2017	DF	22	(France) Benjamin Mendy	(France) Monaco	£49,300,000
30 January 2018	DF	14	(France) Aymeric Laporte	(Spain) Athletic Bilbao	£57,000,000

EDS, Academy and other
Date	Position	No.	Player	From club	Transfer fee
3 July 2017	DF	—	(Spain) Eric García	(Spain) Barcelona	£1,450,000
13 July 2017	MF	—	(Mexico) Uriel Antuna	(Mexico) Santos Laguna	Undisclosed
15 July 2017	MF	—	(Brazil) Douglas Luiz	(Brazil) Vasco da Gama	£10,200,000
11 August 2017	MF	—	(Serbia) Luka Ilić	(Serbia) Red Star Belgrade	£2,500,000
12 August 2017	FW	—	(Nigeria) Olarenwaju Kayode	Austria Wien	Undisclosed
27 August 2017	MF	—	(Ghana) Mohammed Aminu	(Ghana) WAFA	£2,000,000
1 January 2018	DF	—	(United States) Erik Palmer-Brown	(United States) Sporting Kansas City	Free
27 January 2018	MF	—	(United States) Mix Diskerud	(United States) New York City FC	Free (Released)
30 January 2018	MF	—	(England) Jack Harrison	(United States) New York City FC	Undisclosed

=== Transfers out ===
First Team
Exit date	Position	No.	Player	To club	Transfer fee
1 July 2017	GK	13	(Argentina) Willy Caballero	(England) Chelsea	Free (Released)
1 July 2017	DF	22	(France) Gaël Clichy	(Turkey) İstanbul Başakşehir	Free (Released)
1 July 2017	MF	15	(Spain) Jesús Navas	(Spain) Sevilla	Free (Released)
1 July 2017	DF	3	(France) Bacary Sagna	(Italy) Benevento	Free (Released)
1 July 2017	DF	5	(Argentina) Pablo Zabaleta	(England) West Ham United	Free (Released)
11 July 2017	MF	36	(Argentina) Bruno Zuculini	(Italy) Hellas Verona	£1,250,000
16 July 2017	FW	9	(Spain) Nolito	(Spain) Sevilla	£7,650,000
22 July 2017	DF	11	(Serbia) Aleksandar Kolarov	(Italy) Roma	£5,250,000
3 August 2017	FW	72	(Nigeria) Kelechi Iheanacho	(England) Leicester City	£25,000,000
4 August 2017	MF	6	(Brazil) Fernando	(Turkey) Galatasaray	£4,750,000
21 August 2017	MF	11	(France) Samir Nasri	(Turkey) Antalyaspor	£2,000,000
31 August 2017	FW	14	(Ivory Coast) Wilfried Bony	(England) Swansea City	£12,000,000

EDS, Academy and other
Exit date	Position	No.	Player	To club	Transfer fee
1 July 2017	FW	48	(Turkey) Enes Ünal	(Spain) Villarreal	£11,900,000
1 July 2017	DF	—	(England) Callum Bullock	Unattached	Free (Released)
1 July 2017	MF	—	(Australia) Aaron Mooy	(England) Huddersfield Town	£8,000,000
1 July 2017	GK	64	(Wales) Billy O'Brien	(England) Macclesfield Town	Free (Released)
1 July 2017	DF	74	(England) Ellis Plummer	(Scotland) Motherwell	Free (Released)
6 July 2017	FW	—	(Spain) Rubén Sobrino	(Spain) Alavés	£1,700,000
7 July 2017	DF	—	(England) Joe Coveney	(England) Nottingham Forest	Undisclosed
12 July 2017	MF	—	(France) Olivier Ntcham	(Scotland) Celtic	£4,250,000
24 July 2017	MF	61	(England) James Horsfield	(Netherlands) NAC Breda	Undisclosed
11 August 2017	MF	—	(Sweden) Zackarias Faour	(Sweden) IK Sirius	Undisclosed
31 August 2017	FW	48	(England) Jadon Sancho	(Germany) Borussia Dortmund	£8,000,000
10 September 2017	FW	53	(England) Denzeil Boadu	(Germany) Borussia Dortmund II	Undisclosed
6 November 2017	FW	51	(France) David Faupala	(Ukraine) Zorya Luhansk	Free (Released)
5 January 2018	DF	46	(England) Shay Facey	(England) Northampton Town	Undisclosed

=== Loans out ===
First Team
Start date	End date	Position	No.	Player	To club
1 July 2017	30 June 2018	GK	54	(England) Angus Gunn	(England) Norwich City
4 July 2017	30 June 2018	DF	69	(Spain) Angeliño	(Netherlands) NAC Breda
18 July 2017	30 June 2018	GK	—	(England) Joe Hart	(England) West Ham United
31 July 2017	30 June 2018	DF	50	(Spain) Pablo Maffeo	(Spain) Girona
1 August 2017	30 June 2018	MF	75	(Spain) Aleix García	(Spain) Girona
1 August 2017	15 January 2018 (Note: Moreno's planned season long loan at Girona was cancelled on 15 January, and he subsequently joined Flamengo on loan.)	FW	29	(Colombia) Marlos Moreno	(Spain) Girona
28 August 2017	30 June 2018	MF	27	(England) Patrick Roberts	(Scotland) Celtic
31 August 2017	30 June 2018	DF	28	(Belgium) Jason Denayer	(Turkey) Galatasaray
16 January 2018	31 December 2018	FW	29	(Colombia) Marlos Moreno	(Brazil) Flamengo
31 January 2018	30 June 2018	DF	15	(France) Eliaquim Mangala	(England) Everton

EDS, Academy and other
Start date	End date	Position	No.	Player	To club
1 July 2017	30 June 2018	FW	68	(France) Thierry Ambrose	(Netherlands) NAC Breda
1 July 2017	28 July 2017 (Note: Cáceres's planned season long loan at Melbourne City was cancelled on 28 July, and he subsequently joined Al Wasl on loan.)	MF	—	(Australia) Anthony Cáceres	(Australia) Melbourne City
1 July 2017	30 June 2018	MF	67	(Spain) Paolo Fernandes	(Netherlands) NAC Breda
1 July 2017	30 June 2018	MF	76	(Spain) Manu García	(Netherlands) NAC Breda
1 July 2017	30 June 2018	DF	—	(Spain) Pablo Marí	(Netherlands) NAC Breda
1 July 2017	1 January 2018	DF	56	(England) Ashley Smith-Brown	(Scotland) Hearts
3 July 2017	30 June 2018	MF	59	(Kosovo) Bersant Celina	(England) Ipswich Town
11 July 2017	31 December 2017	DF	45	(Nigeria) Chidiebere Nwakali	(Norway) Sogndal
21 July 2017	30 June 2018	FW	—	(Ghana) Thomas Agyepong	(Netherlands) NAC Breda
28 July 2017	30 June 2018	MF	—	(Australia) Anthony Cáceres	(United Arab Emirates) Al-Wasl
1 August 2017	30 June 2018	MF	—	(Australia) Luke Brattan	(Australia) Melbourne City
1 August 2017	30 June 2018	MF	—	(Brazil) Douglas Luiz	(Spain) Girona
3 August 2017	30 June 2018	MF	78	(Netherlands) Rodney Kongolo	(England) Doncaster Rovers
3 August 2017	12 January 2018 (Note: Buckley-Ricketts' season-long loan to FC Twente was ended on 12 January 2018, and he subsequently joined Oxford United on loan.)	FW	70	(England) Isaac Buckley-Ricketts	(Netherlands) Twente
8 August 2017	30 June 2019	FW	—	(Mexico) Uriel Antuna	(Netherlands) Groningen
11 August 2017	30 June 2018	MF	—	(Serbia) Luka Ilić	(Serbia) Red Star Belgrade
11 August 2017	2 March 2018 (Note: Kayode's planned season long loan at Girona was cancelled on 2 March, and he subsequently joined Shakhtar Donetsk on loan.)	FW	—	(Nigeria) Olarenwaju Kayode	(Spain) Girona
17 August 2017	30 June 2018	MF	62	(England) Brandon Barker	(Scotland) Hibernian
23 August 2017	1 January 2018	MF	57	(France) Aaron Nemane	(Scotland) Rangers
31 August 2017	1 January 2018	MF	52	(England) Kean Bryan	(England) Oldham Athletic
1 September 2017	1 January 2018	GK	60	(Norway) Kjetil Haug	(Spain) Peralada-Girona B
1 September 2017	30 June 2018	FW	—	(Ghana) Yaw Yeboah	(Spain) Real Oviedo
1 January 2018	31 December 2018	MF	—	(Ghana) Ernest Agyiri	(Norway) Vålerenga
7 January 2018	30 June 2018	MF	57	(France) Aaron Nemane	(Netherlands) Go Ahead Eagles
10 January 2018	30 June 2018	DF	—	(Nigeria) Chidiebere Nwakali	(Scotland) Aberdeen
12 January 2018	30 June 2018	FW	70	(England) Isaac Buckley-Ricketts	(England) Oxford United
16 January 2018	30 June 2018	MF	52	(England) Kean Bryan	(England) Oldham Athletic
29 January 2018	30 June 2018	DF	56	(England) Ashley Smith-Brown	(England) Oxford United
29 January 2018	30 June 2018	DF	—	(Netherlands) Philippe Sandler	(Netherlands) PEC Zwolle
30 January 2018	30 June 2018	MF	—	(England) Jack Harrison	(England) Middlesbrough
31 January 2018	30 June 2018	MF	—	(Ghana) Divine Naah	(Belgium) Tubize
31 January 2018	30 June 2018	MF	82	(England) Jacob Davenport	(England) Burton Albion
31 January 2018	30 June 2018	DF	—	(United States) Erik Palmer-Brown	(Belgium) Kortrijk
31 January 2018	30 June 2018	DF	58	(England) Charlie Oliver	(England) Fleetwood Town
16 February 2018	31 December 2018	MF	—	(United States) Mix Diskerud	(Sweden) IFK Göteborg
2 March 2018	30 June 2018	FW	—	(Nigeria) Olarenwaju Kayode	(Ukraine) Shakhtar Donetsk

=== Overall transfer activity ===
==== Expenditure ====
Summer: ▼£210,350,000

Winter: ▼£57,000,000

Total: ▼£267,350,000

==== Income ====
Summer: ▲£68,240,000

Winter: £0

Total: ▲£68,240,000

==== Net totals ====
Summer: ▼£142,110,000

Winter: ▼£57,000,000

Total: ▼£199,110,000
