= All or Nothing: Manchester City =

Amazon Original sports docuseries

- Genre: Sports documentary
- Directed by: Manuel Huerga
- Starring: Sergio Agüero
- No. of seasons: 1
- No. of episodes: 8

Production
- Production locations: Manchester, England
- Running time: 45–54 minutes

Original release
- Network: Amazon Prime Video
- Release: 17 August 2018

All or Nothing: Manchester City is an Amazon Prime Video original docuseries as part of the All or Nothing brand. In the series, English Premier League side Manchester City's progress was charted through their 2017–18 season, in which they won two of four contested trophies and broke a series of Premier League performance-related records.

It was announced when news of the story leaked that Amazon had paid Manchester City the sum of £10m for the behind-the-scenes video access.

The series was narrated by Sir Ben Kingsley, who grew up in Salford, Greater Manchester.

== Episodes ==
No. overall	No. in series	Title	Featured matches	Original release date
1	1	"Great Expectations"	City 5–0 Liverpool; City 5–0 Crystal Palace; Chelsea 0–1 City	17 August 2018
Picking up several games into the season, the main characters in the dressing room are introduced. Pep Guardiola's management style and tactics are discussed, and the impact of new signing Benjamin Mendy's season-ending injury is mentioned. In a later match, John Stones picks up another injury. City then face an early-season test of their strength as they go to reigning champions Chelsea, with Mendy forced to watch from a hospital bed.
2	2	"Noisy Neighbours"	Napoli 2–4 City; Leicester City 0–2 City; Manchester United 1–2 City	17 August 2018
A series of interviews with regular Manchester City and United fans introduces the importance of the Manchester derby, and the clubs' rival bids for the 2011–12 Premier League. As the Manchester clubs build up to the first derby of the season, though, City first must navigate a tough Champions League tie against Napoli. Raheem Sterling's importance to the team is highlighted when his goals secure several crucial wins which keep a record-breaking series of wins going. Finally the clubs meet in the derby, a match only heightened by the rivalry between managers Pep Guardiola and José Mourinho.
3	3	"Winter is Coming"	Swansea City 0–4 City; City 4–1 Tottenham Hotspur; Crystal Palace 0–0 City; City 3–1 Watford; Liverpool 4–3 City	17 August 2018
With the onset of winter, the club must prepare for both the snowy conditions of Northern England as well as the impending opening of the winter transfer window. At the same time, the club must find a way to deal with the loss of talismanic player David Silva, who has had to depart for his native Spain where his son has been born very prematurely and is fighting for his life. Meanwhile, City's record-breaking run of league wins is under threat as City travel to Crystal Palace and Liverpool, while injuries continue to pile up.
4	4	"War of Attrition"	City 3–1 Newcastle United; Cardiff City 0–2 City; City 3–0 West Bromwich Albion; Burnley 1–1 City; City 5–1 Leicester City; Basel 0–4 City; Wigan Athletic 1–0 City	17 August 2018
Having qualified from their UEFA Champions League group, City's players and staff begin to look to their first knock-out round tie. Before they can do so, however, they must first negotiate the treacherous English winter season where matches start tallying up fast, including the start of the FA Cup calendar for top-flight clubs. Mercifully, the opening of the transfer window allows the club to look for new recruits to ease the club's injury woes.
5	5	"Road to Wembley"	City (p) 4-1 Wolverhampton Wanderers; Leicester City 1–4 (p) City; Bristol City 2–3 City; City 3–0 Arsenal	17 August 2018
After following the team's travails from a chronological point of view, the documentary steps back to review City's progress through their League Cup campaign. In addition to proving a useful opportunity to blood youth players from the academy, the League Cup also gives Claudio Bravo an opportunity to salvage his reputation after a poor season in the previous year. The players' assistance in turning up at kids' sessions to encourage the next generation is also put into focus.
6	6	"The Beautiful Game"	Arsenal 0–3 City; City 1–0 Chelsea; City 1–2 Basel; Everton 1–3 City	17 August 2018
Immediately after their League Cup triumph, and with heavy snow showers coming in, City must first face Arsenal a second time before meeting Chelsea at a point in the season when energy levels often drop and results can plummet with them. This fact, however, only serves to bring into focus the consistency of City's performance levels, as Guardiola's passing game in particular is brought into focus.
7	7	"Welcome to Hell"	Liverpool 3–0 City; City 2-3 Manchester United; City 1–2 Liverpool	17 August 2018
With the title an allusion to a banner at Galatasaray's Ali Sami Yen Stadium, the episode begins with footage of the violent welcome offered by Liverpool fans to the City team coach before the first leg of the UEFA Champions League quarter-final between the two which resulted in the destruction of the vehicle. The bus attack would go on to herald in a septum horribilis, in which City would lose three games in the space of a week to be knocked out of the Champions League and be stopped from being confirmed the title winners by losing 3-2 to rivals Manchester United at the Etihad.
8	8	"Centurions"	Tottenham Hotspur 1–3 City; Manchester United 0–1 West Bromwich Albion; City 5–0 Swansea City; West Ham United 1–4 City; City 3–1 Brighton & Hove Albion; Southampton 0–1 City	17 August 2018
A week after losing to Manchester United, City's league title can still be confirmed several weeks early if the Reds have a bad result against West Brom, with Vincent Kompany notably following the match at his Mancunian wife's house with his United-supporting father-in-law. Having secured the trophy, Pep Guardiola's attention turns instead to the potential to record 100 league goals and 100 league points by the end of the season, potentially setting multiple records and recording multiple league firsts in the process.

== Controversy ==
By unilaterally signing an agreement with Amazon to film the series, including unprecedented behind the scenes access, Manchester City reportedly greatly angered Premier League broadcaster Sky Sports, who took issue with the fact that City granted access not even offered to match broadcasters in exchange for a large sum of money. Sky's response came hot on the heels of stories suggesting that they were already having to offer large discounts and deals to new customers in the wake of the competition raised by Amazon Prime and Netflix to Sky's existing online entertainment business, and amidst talk that Amazon were preparing to move into match-day broadcasting also.

The series' access was also raised again when it transpired that bitter rivals Manchester United refused access to the cameras to the tunnel and the dressing rooms, although the club themselves claimed this was because they felt their corridors would be too crowded with an extra camera crew present. The denied request became particularly pertinent when City's victory and the ensuing celebrations led to a massed brawl between players and staff of both teams which resulted in City assistant coach Mikel Arteta requiring stitches on his forehead.
