= Georges-Kévin Nkoudou =

Cameroonian-French footballer (born 1995)

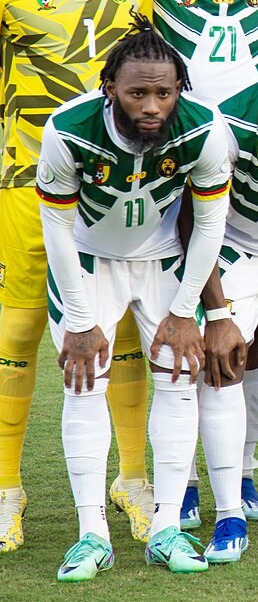
- Nkoudou with Cameroon at the 2023 Africa Cup of Nations

Personal information
- Full name: Georges-Kévin Nkoudou Mbida
- Date of birth: 13 February 1995 (age 31)
- Place of birth: Versailles, Yvelines, France
- Height: 1.72 m (5 ft 8 in)
- Position: Winger

Team information
- Current team: Abha (on loan from Al-Diriyah)

Youth career
- 2006–2007: Petits Anges
- 2007–2008: EST Solitaire Paris
- 2008–2010: Paris Saint-Germain
- 2010–2011: AC Boulogne Billancourt
- 2011–2013: Nantes

Senior career*
Years	Team	Apps	(Gls)
2013–2015	Nantes	40	(3)
2015–2016	Marseille	41	(10)
2016–2019	Tottenham Hotspur	27	(1)
2018	→ Burnley (loan)	8	(0)
2019	→ Monaco (loan)	3	(0)
2019–2023	Beşiktaş	108	(21)
2023–2025	Damac	60	(28)
2025–	Al-Diriyah	20	(3)
2026–	→ Abha (loan)	0	(0)

International career^{‡}
2012	France U17	3	(0)
2013	France U19	2	(0)
2014	France U20	1	(1)
2015–2016	France U21	6	(1)
2022–	Cameroon	19	(3)
- * Club domestic league appearances and goals as of 23:15, 12 April 2026 (UTC) ‡ National team caps and goals as of 22 August 2026

Georges-Kévin Nkoudou Mbida (French pronunciation: [ʒɔʁʒ kevin kudu]; born 13 February 1995) is a professional footballer who plays as a winger for Saudi Pro League club Abha on loan from Al-Diriyah. Born in France, he plays for the Cameroon national team.

== Club career ==
=== Nantes ===
He joined the Paris Saint-Germain Pre-Training Centre in July 2008 as an outsider. However, after two seasons, the Paris club does not offer him to join the training centre. He therefore left PSG for the AC Boulogne-Billancourt club. After a year, he received proposals from Nantes and Lille.

He then decided to join Nantes, where he signed an internship contract in 2011. On 8 August 2013, he initiated a three-year professional contract with club. He made his Ligue 1 debut on the opening game of the 2013–14 season on 11 August 2013 against SC Bastia. He replaced Serge Gakpé in the last minute of the game.

=== Marseille ===
In June 2015, Nkoudou completed a move to Marseille for £1 million. His performances during the 2015–16 season led to him finishing 30th in UEFA's Best Player in Europe poll.

=== Tottenham Hotspur ===
On 31 August 2016, Nkoudou was transferred to Tottenham Hotspur for a reported fee of £11 million, signing a five-year deal with the club. He made his Spurs debut against Gillingham in the League Cup when he came on in the 60th minute for Christian Eriksen, this was followed by a very short debut in the league when he came on in the 90th minute against Middlesbrough. He made 17 appearances for the club in the 2016–17 season, mostly as substitutes and starting only in two games – an EFL Cup game against Liverpool on 25 October 2016 and an FA Cup tie against Wycombe Wanderers on 28 January 2017.

In his first start of the 2017–18 season, Nkoudou scored his first goal for Tottenham in the Champions League group match against APOEL on 6 December 2017 that ended in a 3–0 win.

On 8 January 2018, Nkoudou completed a loan move to Premier League club Burnley until the end of the 2017–18 season. He failed to break into the first team regularly and was mainly a back-up to Jóhann Berg Guðmundsson, going on to make eight appearances.

Nkoudou returned to Tottenham for the 2018–19 season, but found it difficult to break into the first team. He made his first appearance of the season coming off the bench in the fourth round League Cup match against West Ham. He again came on as a substitute in the League match against Fulham, and provided a crucial cross for the winning goal by Harry Winks.

On 31 January 2019, Nkoudou joined Monaco on loan for the remainder of the 2018–19 season.

=== Beşiktaş ===
Nkoudou signed for Beşiktaş on 22 August 2019 in a £4.6 million deal. In Beşiktaş, he never really convinced, with a rather average score during these five years 21 goals and 9 decisive passes in 108 matches all competitions combined.

=== Damac ===
On 15 August 2023, Nkoudou joined Saudi Pro League club Damac on a free transfer. His scoring double and triple at the beginning of the season and competing with Cristiano Ronaldo for the honorary title of top scorer.

=== Al-Diriyah ===
On 9 August 2025, Nkoudou joined Saudi First Division League club Al-Diriyah.

== International career ==
Born in France, Nkoudou is Cameroonian by descent. Nkoudou was a youth international for France at various levels. On 24 April 2022 Nkoudou announced that he wants to play in Cameroon national football team. After three weeks on 13 May 2022 Cameroonian Football Federation announced that FIFA had approved the change in international eligibility of Nkoudou.

A day after the announcement, he was called up to Cameroon national football team for the 2023 Africa Cup of Nations qualification. He planned to play his first match against Burundi on 9 June 2022, but withdrew injured. On November 10, 2022, he was selected by Rigobert Song to compete in the 2022 FIFA World Cup. On 28 December 2023, he was selected from the list of 27 Cameroonian players selected to compete in the 2023 Africa Cup of Nations. Nkoudou was included in the list of Cameroonian players selected by coach David Pagou to participate in the 2025 Africa Cup of Nations.

== Career statistics ==
=== Club ===
As of match played 28 October 2025

Appearances and goals by club, season, and competition
Club	Season	League			National cup (Note: Includes Coupe de France, FA Cup, Turkish Cup, King's Cup)		League cup (Note: Includes Coupe de la Ligue, EFL Cup)		Continental		Total	
Club	Season	Division	Apps	Goals	Apps	Goals	Apps	Goals	Apps	Goals	Apps	Goals
Nantes	2013–14	Ligue 1	6	0	0	0	2	1	—		8	1
Nantes	2014–15	Ligue 1	28	2	3	0	1	0	—		32	2
Nantes	Total		34	2	3	0	3	1	0	0	40	3
Marseille	2015–16	Ligue 1	28	5	5	0	1	1	7 (Note: Appearances in UEFA Europa League)	4	41	10
Tottenham Hotspur	2016–17	Premier League	8	0	3	0	2	0	4 (Note: Three appearances in UEFA Champions League, one appearance in UEFA Europa League)	0	17	0
Tottenham Hotspur	2017–18	Premier League	1	0	1	0	2	0	2 (Note: Appearance(s) in UEFA Champions League)	1	6	1
Tottenham Hotspur	2018–19	Premier League	1	0	1	0	1	0	0	0	3	0
Tottenham Hotspur	2019–20	Premier League	1	0	0	0	0	0	0	0	1	0
Tottenham Hotspur	Total		11	0	5	0	5	0	6	1	27	1
Burnley (loan)	2017–18	Premier League	8	0	—		—		—		8	0
Monaco (loan)	2018–19	Ligue 1	3	0	—		—		—		3	0
Beşiktaş	2019–20	Süper Lig	26	3	3	1	—		2	0	31	4
Beşiktaş	2020–21	Süper Lig	32	8	5	0	—		1	0	38	8
Beşiktaş	2021–22	Süper Lig	16	4	0	0	—		1	0	17	4
Beşiktaş	2022–23	Süper Lig	20	4	2	1	—		0	0	22	5
Beşiktaş	Total		94	19	10	2	—		4	0	108	21
Damac	2023–24	Saudi Pro League	31	15	2	0	—		—		33	15
Damac	2024–25	Saudi Pro League	29	13	1	0	—		—		30	13
Damac	Total		60	28	3	0	—		—		63	28
Al-Diriyah	2025–26	Saudi First Division League	6	1	0	0	—		—		6	1
Career total			244	55	26	2	9	2	17	5	295	64

=== International ===
As of match played 9 January 2026

Appearances and goals by national team and year
National team	Year	Apps	Goals
Cameroon	2022	4	0
Cameroon	2023	2	1
Cameroon	2024	7	1
Cameroon	2025	5	1
Cameroon	2026	1	0
Total		19	3

Scores and results list Cameroon's goal tally first, score column indicates score after each Nkoudou goal.

List of international goals scored by Georges-Kévin Nkoudou
No.	Date	Venue	Opponent	Score	Result	Competition
1	17 November 2023	Japoma Stadium, Douala, Cameroon	Mauritius	2–0	3–0	2026 FIFA World Cup qualification
2	19 November 2024	Ahmadou Ahidjo Stadium, Yaoundé, Cameroon	Zimbabwe	2–0	2–1	2025 Africa Cup of Nations qualification
3	4 September 2025	Ahmadou Ahidjo Stadium, Yaoundé, Cameroon	Eswatini	2–0	3–0	2026 FIFA World Cup qualification

== Honours ==
Beşiktaş

- Süper Lig: 2020–21
- Turkish Cup: 2020–21
- Turkish Super Cup: 2021
