= Alfie Whiteman =

English former footballer (born 1998)

Personal information
- Full name: Alfie Malik Whiteman
- Date of birth: 2 October 1998 (age 28)
- Place of birth: Tottenham, England
- Height: 6 ft 2 in (1.89 m)
- Position: Goalkeeper

Youth career
- 2015–2020: Tottenham Hotspur

Senior career*
Years	Team	Apps	(Gls)
2017–2025	Tottenham Hotspur	0	(0)
2021	→ Degerfors (loan)	13	(0)
2022	→ Degerfors (loan)	21	(0)
Total		34	(0)

International career
2015	England U17	9	(0)
2017	England U19	1	(0)
- * Club domestic league appearances and goals

Alfie Malik Whiteman (born 2 October 1998) is an English photographer, director, radio host and former professional footballer who played as a goalkeeper.

== Football career ==
Whiteman joined the Tottenham academy at the age of 10. In 2019, he signed a new three-year contract with the club.

On 26 November 2020, Whiteman made his sole appearance for Tottenham when he was brought on as a substitute against Ludogorets Razgrad in the UEFA Europa League in the 82nd minute, replacing Joe Hart.

In April 2021, Whiteman tore his meniscus, which he underwent surgery for.

On 12 August 2021, Whiteman joined Swedish Allsvenskan side Degerfors on loan for the rest of the Swedish 2021 season. He returned to Tottenham after the Swedish season finished in December 2021. Whiteman began a second loan with Degerfors in February 2022, and returned to Tottenham in December 2022.

On 22 February 2023, it was announced that Whiteman had signed a new 2-year contract with Tottenham.

In August 2023, Whiteman suffered an ankle injury during Tottenham's 2023–24 season pre-season tour in Singapore.

After recovering from his ankle injury, Whiteman requested to go out on loan for the 2024–25 season, but was denied as Tottenham needed to use him as a club-trained player for their upcoming Europa League campaign, with sanctioning body UEFA requiring clubs to include at least 4 club-trained players in their squads in order to partake in their competitions, a competition Tottenham would win with Whiteman being awarded a winner's medal.

On 31 May 2025, Tottenham announced that Whiteman would leave the club at the end of his contract. In October 2025, Whiteman retired from professional football, despite interest from different clubs, in order to further pursue his creative ambitions.

== Later career ==
Whiteman's father was a jazz guitarist and Whiteman attended Soho jazz club Ronnie Scott's with him, and saw performances by Roy Ayers, Lonnie Liston Smith, and Eumir Deodato. He has produced work as a DJ and hosts the monthly music program Sweet Tooth w/ Alfie Whiteman for NTS Radio since May 2024 after a successful pilot episode in February, showcasing music from a variety of genres including jazz fusion, new wave, shoegaze, dream pop, folk and trip hop. Whiteman also has interests in art and art house cinema.

Following his retirement from football, Whiteman joined production company Somesuch in October 2025 to pursue a career in photography and film direction. In May 2026, Whiteman launched the Alfie Whiteman: ‘A Loan’ exhibit and accompanying art book at the OOF Gallery at the Tottenham Hotspur Stadium, which features photos and diary entries of his time on loan at Swedish club Degerfors.

== Personal life ==
Whiteman was born and raised in Tottenham, attending Park View School. He is of Pakistani and Finnish descent. Whiteman is a boyhood Tottenham Hotspur fan, with the club's stadium in view of his parents' house.

== Career statistics ==
Appearances and goals by club, season and competition
Club	Season	League			National cup		League cup		Other		Total	
Club	Season	Division	Apps	Goals	Apps	Goals	Apps	Goals	Apps	Goals	Apps	Goals
Tottenham Hotspur U23	2017–18	–	—		—		—		1 (Note: Appearance(s) in EFL Trophy)	0	1	0
Tottenham Hotspur U23	2018–19	–	—		—		—		2	0	2	0
Tottenham Hotspur U23	2019–20	–	—		—		—		2	0	2	0
Tottenham Hotspur U23	Total		0	0	0	0	0	0	5	0	5	0
Tottenham Hotspur	2020–21	Premier League	0	0	0	0	0	0	1 (Note: Appearance in UEFA Europa League)	0	1	0
Tottenham Hotspur	2022–23	Premier League	0	0	0	0	0	0	0	0	0	0
Tottenham Hotspur	2023–24	Premier League	0	0	0	0	0	0	0	0	0	0
Tottenham Hotspur	2024–25	Premier League	0	0	0	0	0	0	0	0	0	0
Tottenham Hotspur	Total		0	0	0	0	0	0	1	0	1	0
Degerfors IF (loan)	2021	Allsvenskan	13	0	0	0	—		—		13	0
Degerfors IF (loan)	2022	Allsvenskan	21	0	0	0	—		—		21	0
Career total			34	0	0	0	0	0	6	0	40	0

== Honours ==
Tottenham Hotspur

- UEFA Europa League: 2024–25
