= Tanguy Ndombele =

French footballer (born 1996)

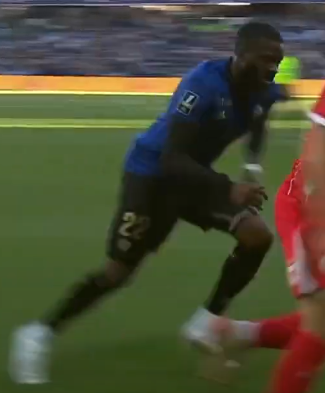
- Ndombele playing for Nice in 2024

Personal information
- Full name: Tanguy Ndombele Alvaro
- Date of birth: 28 December 1996 (age 29)
- Place of birth: Longjumeau, France
- Height: 1.81 m (5 ft 11 in)
- Position: Midfielder

Youth career
- 2002–2005: FC Épinay-sous-Sénart
- 2005–2009: FC Épinay Athletico
- 2009–2011: Linas-Montlhéry
- 2011–2014: Guingamp

Senior career*
Years	Team	Apps	(Gls)
2014–2016	Amiens B	22	(1)
2016–2018	Amiens	33	(2)
2017–2018	→ Lyon (loan)	32	(0)
2018–2019	Lyon	34	(1)
2019–2024	Tottenham Hotspur	63	(6)
2022	→ Lyon (loan)	11	(0)
2022–2023	→ Napoli (loan)	30	(1)
2023–2024	→ Galatasaray (loan)	19	(0)
2024–2026	Nice	26	(1)

International career
2017–2018	France U21	11	(0)
2018–2021	France	7	(0)
- * Club domestic league appearances and goals as of 23:21, 18 April 2026 (UTC)

Tanguy Ndombele Alvaro (born 28 December 1996) is a French professional footballer who plays as a midfielder.

Ndombele finished his youth career at Guingamp but was not offered a professional contract. He signed for Ligue 2 side Amiens, playing for the reserves until becoming a first-team regular in the 2015–16 season. Ahead of the 2016–17 season, he moved to Lyon as part of a loan deal. Ndombele played regularly during the season as Lyon finished third and returned to the UEFA Champions League. After another season at the club, he earned a move to Premier League side Tottenham Hotspur in a deal worth £62 million.

At Tottenham, Ndombele's first seasons were unsuccessful, which saw him getting criticized for his work rate and dropped from the squad in 2021. He then went on several loan deals. He won the Scudetto with Napoli and the Süper Lig with Galatasaray before signing for Nice permanently in 2024.

== Early life ==
Tanguy Ndombele Alvaro was born on 28 December 1996 in Longjumeau, Essonne to parents from DR Congo. He holds both French and Congolese nationalities.

== Club career ==
=== Early career ===
As a child, Ndombele played at FC Épinay Athlético, a club based in Épinay-sous-Sénart, about 20 kilometres south-east of Paris, in Essonne. He then moved to Brittany when he was 14, in order to play for Guingamp, where he spent three seasons. He was not offered a professional contract at the end of his development. At 16, he made his senior debut, on 11 January 2014 with the reserves, by replacing Vital N'Simba near the final whistle.

He then signed for SC Amiens, who'd just been relegated from French Ligue 2 in June 2014; he took this as an opportunity to trial at numerous clubs (Auxerre, Caen, and Angers) but wasn't signed. The issue was that Ndombele was criticised for being "overweight"; this was the main reason that he wasn't signed by clubs, even though trialists were aware that he was a good playmaker.

Ndombele played two seasons in Championnat National 3 with the Amiens reserve team. He only played one game during the 2014–15 season, 8 November 2014, once again, coming on late in the match. He became a regular during the 2015–16 season, taking part in 18 matches. He started for the first time on 5 September 2015 at the age of 18 years and nine months.

=== Lyon ===
On 31 August 2017, Ndombele moved to Lyon on a one-year loan. According to L'Équipe, Lyon paid €2 million for the loan. Lyon also secured an option to sign him permanently for €8 million, plus a possible €250,000 in bonuses and 20% of any profit made should he be transferred from Lyon to another club.

Ndombele made his competitive debut for Lyon's first team in the 2–0 Ligue 1 away loss to Paris Saint-Germain on 17 September 2017; he started the match and was replaced by Christopher Martins in the 72nd minute. On 15 February 2018, Ndombele scored a goal (his first career competitive goal for Lyon's first team) in the 46th minute of their 3–1 home win over Villarreal CF in the round of 32 first leg of the 2017–18 UEFA Europa League.

During his first season, Lyon finished third behind PSG and Monaco, securing Champions League football for the next season. He became a regular starter for the team and was, alongside Ferland Mendy and Houssem Aouar, an important young player for the team. Lyon paid the €8 million release fee to buy him from his former club Amiens.

The next season, Lyon signed him permanently as it was previously stated in the loan deal and his contract was extended until 2022 with the Gones. He started off the season well and for his first match in the UEFA Champions League against Manchester City at the City of Manchester Stadium, with a 2–1 away win, goals from Cornet and Fekir. He then scored his first Champions League goal against TSG 1899 Hoffenheim on 11 November 2018 (2–2 draw). He scored his first Ligue 1 goal against Nîmes on 24 May 2019 and Lyon eventually finished third in Ligue 1, behind Lille and PSG.

His team was also eliminated by FC Barcelona in Champions League Round-of-16 (5–1 loss over the two legs) and finished the season trophy-less despite giving out great performances against superior teams (2–1 win against PSG, 2–1 win and 2–2 draw against Manchester City, 0–0 draw against Barcelona). Lyon's president Jean-Michel Aulas announced that he had received offers for Ndombele and that he might leave that summer.

=== Tottenham Hotspur ===
On 2 July 2019, Ndombele signed for Tottenham Hotspur in a club-record deal worth €62 million (£55.45 million) plus up to €10 million (£8.97 million) in add-ons, surpassing the previous transfer record set by Davinson Sánchez. He made his debut in the 2019 International Champions Cup against Juventus. Within a minute of being substituted on and with his first touch in a Tottenham shirt, Ndombele assisted Lucas Moura. Tottenham won the game 3–2.

On 10 August 2019, Ndombele made his Premier League debut for Tottenham and scored the first league goal for the club in the 2019–20 season, helping the team to come from behind to win 3–1 against Aston Villa.

Due to his poor form, after a 1–1 draw with Burnley on 7 March 2020 Tottenham manager José Mourinho criticised Ndombele's performance and his perceived unprofessionalism saying "He's a player with great talent. He has to know he has to do much better and know I cannot keep giving him opportunities to play because the team is much more important." He only played two further games that season, and his poor relationship with the manager led to widespread expectation he would leave in the summer, but he stayed and the rift eventually healed.

In the 2020–21 season, on 17 September 2020, Ndombele scored the late winner against Lokomotiv Plovdiv in the second qualifying round of the Europa League, sealing a 2–1 win that sent Tottenham to the next qualifying round. In the Premier League game against Manchester United on 4 October, he scored his first Premier League goal of the season, starting a rout that ended in a 6–1 win, which is the biggest win for Tottenham at Old Trafford, and the best result against United since 1932. His string of strong performances, in particular a 0–0 draw against Chelsea, in which he performed a skill move to get away from N'Golo Kanté and Thiago Silva, led him to be considered by fans to be one of the most polarising midfielders in the Premier League that season. These strong showings helped his team to stand at the top of the league in December.

On 17 January 2021, Ndombele scored when he flicked the ball while facing away from the goal, and scored from a tight angle with the ball landing at the far corner of Sheffield United's goal, capping a 3–1 win for Tottenham. On 25 January 2021, Ndombele scored his first FA Cup goal in a 4–1 away win over Championship side Wycombe Wanderers in the Fourth round, eventually scoring a second in stoppage time to secure the victory. In the final rounds of the season, due to poor fitness condition and injury, Ndombele was left out of the squad by interim manager Ryan Mason.

At the end of the 2023–24 season, Tottenham confirmed the mutual termination of Ndombele's contract with the club.

==== Loan moves ====
On 31 January 2022, Lyon announced the return of Ndombele on a loan deal until the end of the season, with an option to buy the player for €65 million. On 18 August 2022, Ndombele was loaned to Napoli until the end of the season with an option to buy the player for €30 million. On 4 September 2023, he joined Turkish Süper Lig side Galatasaray on loan with an option to buy for €15m. Following three unsuccessful loan spells during which none of the clubs chose to exercise the purchase option, his contract with Tottenham was mutually terminated, which would expire on 30 June 2024.

=== OGC Nice ===
On 4 July 2024, Ndombele signed a two-year contract with French side Nice. His move marked the start of a career revival—reports highlighted that he took a significant pay cut to return to France.

Under manager Franck Haise, Ndombele quickly reasserted influence in midfield, starting regularly and contributing goals and assists early in the 2024–25 season. Journalists noted he ranked among Ligue 1’s leaders in metrics such as key passes, take-ons, and expected assists. He contributed a goal in Nice’s 8‑0 memorable victory over Saint‑Étienne.

== International career ==
On 11 October 2018, Ndombele made his senior France debut by coming on as a substitute for Paul Pogba in the 67th minute of the friendly match against Iceland at the Stade du Roudourou in Guingamp that ended in a 2–2 draw.

== Career statistics ==
=== Club ===
As of match played 18 April 2026

Appearances and goals by club, season and competition
Club	Season	League			National cup (Note: Includes Coupe de France, FA Cup, Coppa Italia, Turkish Cup)		League cup (Note: Includes Coupe de la Ligue, EFL Cup)		Europe		Total	
Club	Season	Division	Apps	Goals	Apps	Goals	Apps	Goals	Apps	Goals	Apps	Goals
Amiens	2016–17	Ligue 2	30	2	0	0	1	0	—		31	2
Amiens	2017–18	Ligue 1	3	0	0	0	0	0	—		3	0
Amiens	Total		33	2	0	0	1	0	—		34	2
Lyon (loan)	2017–18	Ligue 1	32	0	4	0	1	0	10 (Note: Appearances in UEFA Europa League)	1	47	1
Lyon	2018–19	Ligue 1	34	1	5	0	2	0	8 (Note: Appearances in UEFA Champions League)	2	49	3
Lyon	Total		66	1	9	0	3	0	18	3	96	4
Tottenham Hotspur	2019–20	Premier League	21	2	2	0	0	0	6	0	29	2
Tottenham Hotspur	2020–21	Premier League	33	3	2	2	2	0	9	1	46	6
Tottenham Hotspur	2021–22	Premier League	9	1	1	0	3	1	3 (Note: Appearances in UEFA Europa Conference League)	0	16	2
Tottenham Hotspur	Total		63	6	5	2	5	1	18	1	91	10
Lyon (loan)	2021–22	Ligue 1	11	0	—		—		4	1	15	1
Napoli (loan)	2022–23	Serie A	30	1	1	0	—		9	1	40	2
Galatasaray (loan)	2023–24	Süper Lig	19	0	2	0	—		5 (Note: Four appearances in UEFA Champions League, one appearance in UEFA Europa League)	0	26	0
Nice	2024–25	Ligue 1	18	1	2	1	—		5	0	25	2
Nice	2025–26	Ligue 1	8	0	3	0	—		2	0	13	0
Nice	Total		26	1	5	1	—		7	0	38	2
Career total			248	11	21	3	9	1	61	6	339	21

=== International ===
As of match played 28 March 2021

Appearances and goals by national team and year
National team	Year	Apps	Goals
France	2018	4	0
France	2019	2	0
France	2020	0	0
France	2021	1	0
Total		7	0

== Honours ==
Tottenham Hotspur

- EFL Cup runner-up: 2020–21

Napoli

- Serie A: 2022–23

Galatasaray

- Süper Lig: 2023–24
- Turkish Super Cup: 2023

Nice

- Coupe de France runner-up: 2025–26

Individual

- UNFP Ligue 1 Team of the Year: 2018–19
- UEFA Champions League Squad of the Season: 2018–19
