= Anthony Georgiou =

Cypriot footballer (born 1995)

Personal information
- Full name: Anthony Michael Georgiou
- Date of birth: 24 February 1997 (age 29)
- Place of birth: Lewisham, England
- Height: 1.79 m (5 ft 10 in)
- Positions: Left-back; midfielder

Team information
- Current team: Woking
- Number: 30

Youth career
- –2013: Watford
- 2013–2017: Tottenham Hotspur

Senior career*
Years	Team	Apps	(Gls)
2017–2021	Tottenham Hotspur	0	(0)
2019	→ Levante B (loan)	11	(1)
2019	→ Ipswich Town (loan)	10	(0)
2020	→ Bolton Wanderers (loan)	2	(0)
2021–2022	AEL Limassol	19	(2)
2022–2023	Leyton Orient	0	(0)
2022	→ Yeovil Town (loan)	2	(0)
2023–2024	Enosis Neon Paralimni	21	(0)
2024–2026	Wealdstone	69	(3)
2026–	Woking	8	(0)

International career^{‡}
2018–2019	Cyprus	8	(0)
- * Club domestic league appearances and goals as of 19:30 11 October 2026 (UTC) ‡ National team caps and goals as of 21:39, 9 September 2019 (UTC)

Anthony Michael Georgiou (Greek: Άντονι Γεωργίου; born 10 August 1995) is a professional footballer who last played as a midfielder or left-back for National League club Woking. Born in England, he represents Cyprus at international level.

== Club career ==
Georgiou made his professional debut for Tottenham in a 3–0 UEFA Champions League victory over Cypriot champions APOEL on 26 September 2017. In the January 2019 transfer window Georgiou went out on loan to Spanish club Levante. On 19 August 2019, Georgiou signed a new contract with Tottenham until 2021. Following the signing of a new contract with Tottenham Georgiou joined League One club Ipswich Town on loan on 19 August until January 2020. He made his League One debut the next day against AFC Wimbledon at Portman Road, starting in the second half as a substitute and helping the team to a 2–1 win. His loan was ended on 28 December, having made 13 appearances in all competitions but without making a league start during his loan spell. On 31 January 2020, Georgiou joined another League One club, Bolton Wanderers on another six-month loan. Because of injury his debut didn't come until 7 March, where he came on as a substitute in the second half against AFC Wimbledon in a 0–0 draw. He played one more match, also as a substitute, before the COVID-19 pandemic ended the season three months early.

In January 2021 Georgiou joined AEL Limassol in the Cypriot First Division in a permanent transfer from Tottenham.

Georgiou signed a one-year contract for Leyton Orient on 30 June 2022. On 7 November 2022, Georgiou signed for National League side Yeovil Town on a short-term loan deal.

Georgiou played 21 times for Cypriot Second Division team Enosis Neon Paralimni in the 2023–24 season, as part of the team that was promoted to the First Division.

On 25 July 2024, Georgiou signed for National League side Wealdstone. After registering 41 appearances in his first season at the club, Georgiou signed a one-year contract extension in July 2025. He started in Wealdstone's FA Trophy final defeat against Southend United in May 2026, before leaving the club by mutual consent the following month.

On 18 August 2026, Georgiou joined National League side Woking on a short-term deal.

== International career ==
Georgiou was born in England and is of Greek Cypriot descent. He played youth international football for Cyprus and made his debut for the senior Cyprus national football team on 23 March 2018 in a friendly match with Montenegro that finished goalless.

== Career statistics ==
=== Club ===
As of match played 13 October 2026

Appearances and goals by club, season and competition
Club	Season	League			National Cup (Note: National competitions include the FA Cup, Cypriot Cup)		League Cup (Note: League Cup competitions include the EFL Cup)		Other		Total	
Club	Season	Division	Apps	Goals	Apps	Goals	Apps	Goals	Apps	Goals	Apps	Goals
Tottenham Hotspur	2017–18	Premier League	0	0	0	0	0	0	1 (Note: Appearance in UEFA Champions League)	0	1	0
Tottenham Hotspur	2018–19	Premier League	0	0	0	0	0	0	0	0	0	0
Tottenham Hotspur	2019–20	Premier League	0	0	0	0	0	0	0	0	0	0
Tottenham Hotspur	2020–21	Premier League	0	0	0	0	0	0	0	0	0	0
Tottenham Hotspur	Total		0	0	0	0	0	0	1	0	1	0
Levante B (loan)	2018–19	Segunda División B	11	1	—		—		—		11	1
Ipswich Town (loan)	2019–20	League One	10	0	2	0	0	0	1 (Note: Appearance(s) in EFL Trophy)	0	13	0
Bolton Wanderers (loan)	2019–20	League One	2	0	—		—		—		2	0
AEL Limassol	2020–21	Cypriot First Division	13	2	3	0	—		—		16	2
AEL Limassol	2021–22	Cypriot First Division	6	0	0	0	—		1 (Note: Appearance in UEFA Europa Conference League)	0	7	0
AEL Limassol	Total		19	2	3	0	—		1	0	23	2
Leyton Orient	2022–23	League Two	0	0	0	0	1	0	1	0	2	0
Yeovil Town (loan)	2022–23	National League	2	0	—		—		0	0	2	0
Enosis Neon Paralimni	2023–24	Cypriot Second Division	21	0	—		—		0	0	21	0
Wealdstone	2024–25	National League	34	1	3	0	—		5 (Note: Includes FA Trophy and National League Cup)	0	42	1
Wealdstone	2025–26	National League	35	2	3	0	—		6	0	44	2
Wealdstone	Total		69	3	6	0	—		11	0	86	3
Woking	2026–27	National League	8	0	0	0	—		3 (Note: Appearance(s) in National League Cup)	0	11	0
Career total			142	6	11	0	1	0	18	0	172	6

=== International ===
As of match played 9 September 2019.

Cyprus
Year	Apps	Goals
2018	2	0
2019	6	0
Total	8	0

== Honours ==
Wealdstone

- FA Trophy runner-up: 2025–26
