= 2020–21 Tottenham Hotspur F.C. season =

English football club season

Tottenham Hotspur
2020–21 season
- Owner: ENIC International Ltd.
- Chairman: Daniel Levy
- Head coach: José Mourinho (until 19 April); Ryan Mason (interim, from 19 April)
- Stadium: Tottenham Hotspur Stadium
- Premier League: 7th
- FA Cup: Fifth round
- EFL Cup: Runners-up
- UEFA Europa League: Round of 16
- Top goalscorer: League: Harry Kane (23); All: Harry Kane (33)
- Biggest win: 7–2 (1 October 2020 vs Maccabi Haifa, Europa League); 6–1 (4 October 2020 vs Manchester United, League); 5–0 (10 January 2021 vs Marine, FA Cup)
- Biggest defeat: 0–3 (13 February 2021 vs Manchester City, Premier League); 0–3 (18 March 2021 vs Dinamo Zagreb, Europa League)
Home colours	Away colours	Third colours

The 2020–21 season was Tottenham Hotspur's 29th season in the Premier League and 43rd successive season in the top division of the English football league system. After finishing sixth in the 2019–20 league season, Tottenham entered the UEFA Europa League at the second qualifying round, ultimately reaching the round of 16 in the competition where they were eliminated by Dinamo Zagreb. In the FA Cup, the club was knocked out by Everton in the fifth round.

In the Premier League, Tottenham lost their first game at home to Everton, but then went on an unbeaten run into December, topping the league standings for four weeks. With an away loss to Liverpool, the team's form dropped. José Mourinho had guided the club to the Carabao Cup final, where they would face Manchester City. However, because of the dropped form in the league, he was sacked along with his coaching staff on 19 April 2021, and replaced by former player Ryan Mason as interim head coach until the end of the season. Mason's first game in charge was against Southampton at home, which Tottenham won. The next game was the Carabao Cup final, where Manchester City narrowly prevailed 1–0.

This season was notable for Gareth Bale's return from Real Madrid on loan for a season-long second stint at Tottenham, the first time he played in North London after 2012–13.

== First-team squad ==
Squad no.	Name	Nationality	Position(s)	Date of birth (age)
Goalkeepers
1	Hugo Lloris (C)	(France)	GK	26 December 1986 (aged 34)
12	Joe Hart	(England)	GK	19 April 1987 (aged 34)
22	Paulo Gazzaniga	(Argentina)	GK	2 January 1992 (aged 29)
41	Alfie Whiteman	(England)	GK	2 October 1998 (aged 22)
Defenders
2	Matt Doherty	(Republic of Ireland)	RB / RWB	16 January 1992 (aged 29)
3	Sergio Reguilón	(Spain)	LB / LWB	16 December 1996 (aged 24)
4	Toby Alderweireld	(Belgium)	CB	2 March 1989 (aged 32)
6	Davinson Sánchez	(Colombia)	CB	12 June 1996 (aged 25)
14	Joe Rodon	(Wales)	CB	22 October 1997 (aged 23)
15	Eric Dier	(England)	CB / DM	15 January 1994 (aged 27)
24	Serge Aurier	(Ivory Coast)	RB / RWB	24 December 1992 (aged 28)
25	Japhet Tanganga	(England)	CB / LB / RB	31 March 1999 (aged 22)
33	Ben Davies	(Wales)	LB / CB	24 April 1993 (aged 28)
-	Danny Rose	(England)	LB / LWB	2 July 1990 (aged 30)
Midfielders
5	Pierre-Emile Højbjerg	(Denmark)	DM / CM	5 August 1995 (age 25)
8	Harry Winks	(England)	CM / DM	2 February 1996 (aged 25)
11	Erik Lamela	(Argentina)	RW / LW / AM	4 March 1992 (aged 29)
17	Moussa Sissoko	(France)	CM	16 August 1989 (aged 31)
18	Giovani Lo Celso	(Argentina)	CM / AM / DM	9 April 1996 (aged 25)
20	Dele Alli	(England)	CM / AM	11 April 1996 (aged 25)
27	Lucas Moura	(Brazil)	RW / LW / SS	13 August 1992 (aged 28)
28	Tanguy Ndombele	(France)	CM / AM	28 December 1996 (aged 24)
Forwards
7	Son Heung-min	(South Korea)	LW / ST / RW / SS	8 July 1992 (aged 28)
9	Gareth Bale	(Wales)	RW / SS	16 July 1989 (aged 31)
10	Harry Kane (VC)	(England)	ST / SS	28 July 1993 (aged 27)
23	Steven Bergwijn	(Netherlands)	LW / RW	8 October 1997 (aged 23)
45	Carlos Vinícius	(Brazil)	ST	25 March 1995 (age 25)

Last updated: 2 October 2020.
Source: Tottenham Hotspur F.C.

== Transfers ==
=== Released ===
Date from	Position	Nationality	Name	To	Notes	Ref.
1 July 2020	DF	(England)	Tariq Hinds	Free agent	Released	
27 July 2020	MF	(England)	Jonathan Dinzeyi	(England) Arsenal	Released	(Note: After being released, Dinzeyi signed for Arsenal in August.)
27 July 2020	RB	(England)	Maxwell Statham	(England) Watford	Released	(Note: After being released, Statham signed for Watford in September.)
27 July 2020	MF	(Finland)	Maximus Tainio	(Finland) FC Haka	Released	(Note: Tainio signed for FC Haka in late May 2020.)
27 July 2020	CB	(Belgium)	Jan Vertonghen	(Portugal) Benfica	Released	(Note: After being released, Vertonghen signed for Benfica in August.)
27 July 2020	GK	(Netherlands)	Michel Vorm	Retired	Released	(Note: After being released, Vorm retired from football in October.)
27 July 2020	MF	(England)	Rayan Clarke	Free agent	Released	
27 July 2020	MF	(Scotland)	Phoenix Patterson	Free agent	Released	

=== Loans in ===
Date from	Position	Nationality	Name	From	Date until	Ref.
19 September 2020	RW	(Wales)	Gareth Bale	(Spain) Real Madrid	30 June 2021	
2 October 2020	ST	(Brazil)	Carlos Vinícius	(Portugal) Benfica	30 June 2021	

=== Loans out ===
Date from	Position	Nationality	Name	To	Date until	Ref.
1 August 2020	FW	(Republic of Ireland)	Troy Parrott	(England) Millwall	1 February 2021	
11 August 2020	CB	(England)	TJ Eyoma	(England) Lincoln City	End of season	
17 August 2020	CM	(England)	Oliver Skipp	(England) Norwich City	End of season	
17 September 2020	CM	(Cyprus)	Jack Roles	(England) Burton Albion	1 January 2021	
18 September 2020	RW	(England)	Shilow Tracey	(England) Shrewsbury Town	25 January 2021	
4 October 2020	CB	(Argentina)	Juan Foyth	(Spain) Villarreal	End of season	
5 October 2020	LM	(England)	Ryan Sessegnon	(Germany) 1899 Hoffenheim	End of season	
9 October 2020	FW	(England)	Kazaiah Sterling	(England) Southend United	4 January 2021	
16 October 2020	GK	(Nigeria)	Josh Oluwayemi	(England) Maidenhead United	1 January 2021	
16 October 2020	CB	(United States)	Cameron Carter-Vickers	(England) Bournemouth	End of season	
23 October 2020	MF	(England)	Chay Cooper	(England) Southend United	December 2020	(Note: Cooper's loan to Southend constituted a work experience loan.)
6 January 2021	RB	(England)	Jubril Okedina	(England) Cambridge United	End of season	
14 January 2021	RW	(England)	Jack Clarke	(England) Stoke City	End of season	
18 January 2021	DM	(England)	Harvey White	(England) Portsmouth	End of season	
22 January 2021	GK	(United States)	Brandon Austin	(United States) Orlando City	End of season	
25 January 2021	RW	(England)	Shilow Tracey	(England) Cambridge United	End of season	
28 January 2021	CB	(England)	Malachi Fagan-Walcott	(Scotland) Dundee	End of season	
1 February 2021	CF	(Republic of Ireland)	Troy Parrott	(England) Ipswich Town	End of season	
1 February 2021	CM	(Cyprus)	Jack Roles	(England) Stevenage	End of season	
1 February 2021	CF	(England)	Kazaiah Sterling	(Scotland) Greenock Morton	End of season	
1 February 2021	GK	(Argentina)	Paulo Gazzaniga	(Spain) Elche CF	End of season	

=== Transfers in ===
Date from	Position	Nationality	Name	From	Fee	Ref.
28 July 2020	MF	(England)	Alfie Devine	(England) Wigan Athletic	£500,000	
11 August 2020	DM	(Denmark)	Pierre-Emile Højbjerg	(England) Southampton	£15,000,000	
18 August 2020	GK	(England)	Joe Hart	Free agent	Free transfer	
30 August 2020	RB	(Republic of Ireland)	Matt Doherty	(England) Wolverhampton Wanderers	£13,400,000	
12 September 2020	RB	(England)	Keenan Ferguson	(England) Sheffield United	Free transfer	
19 September 2020	LB	(Spain)	Sergio Reguilón	(Spain) Real Madrid	£25,000,000	
21 September 2020	CB	(Estonia)	Maksim Paskotši	(Estonia) Flora	Undisclosed	
3 October 2020	RB	(England)	Marcel Lavinier	(England) Chelsea	Free transfer	
3 October 2020	LB	(Nigeria)	Tobi Omole	(England) Arsenal	Free transfer	
16 October 2020	CB	(Wales)	Joe Rodon	(Wales) Swansea City	£11,000,000	

=== Transfers out ===
Date from	Position	Nationality	Name	To	Fee	Ref.
1 July 2020	CB	(England)	Benjamin Watt	(England) Oxford United	Free transfer	
11 August 2020	RB	(England)	Kyle Walker-Peters	(England) Southampton	£12,000,000	
17 August 2020	CM	(England)	Luke Amos	(England) Queens Park Rangers	Undisclosed	
17 August 2020	CM	(England)	Armando Shashoua	(Spain) Atlético Baleares	Undisclosed	
21 January 2021	LM	(Cyprus)	Anthony Georgiou	(Cyprus) AEL Limassol	Undisclosed	
31 January 2021	RW	(Spain)	Maurizio Pochettino	(England) Watford	Free transfer	
1 February 2021	GK	(Belgium)	Jonathan De Bie	(Belgium) Molenbeek	Undisclosed	

=== Overall transfer activity ===
==== Expenditure ====
Summer: ▼£64,900,000

Winter: £0

Total: ▼£64,900,000

==== Income ====
Summer: ▲£12,000,000

Winter: £0

Total: ▲£12,000,000

==== Net totals ====
Summer: ▼£52,900,000

Winter: £0

Total: ▼£52,900,000

== Pre-season and friendlies ==
Win Draw Loss Fixtures

22 August 2020 Friendly	Tottenham Hotspur	3–0	Ipswich Town	Tottenham, England
15:00 BST (UTC+1)	Sessegnon 6'; Son 10', 29'	Report		Stadium: Tottenham Hotspur Stadium; Attendance: 0 Referee: Kevin Friend

28 August 2020 Friendly	Tottenham Hotspur	4–1	Reading	Tottenham, England
15:30 BST (UTC+1)	Richards 7' (o.g.); Alli 21'; Son 39'; Lamela 52'	Report	Pușcaș 80' (pen.)	Stadium: Tottenham Hotspur Stadium; Attendance: 0 Referee: Craig Pawson

29 August 2020 Friendly	Tottenham Hotspur	1–0	Birmingham City	Tottenham, England
15:00 BST (UTC+1)	Bergwijn 89'	Report		Stadium: Tottenham Hotspur Stadium; Attendance: 0 Referee: Peter Bankes

5 September 2020 Friendly	Watford	2–1	Tottenham Hotspur	Watford, England
15:00 BST (UTC+1)	Quina 20'; Chalobah (yellow card) 30'; Gray 39' (pen.); Phillips (yellow card) 69'; João Pedro (yellow card) 76'; Peñaranda (yellow card) 81'	Report	Alli (yellow card) 72'; Son 79' (pen.)	Stadium: Vicarage Road; Attendance: 0 Referee: Jarred Gillett

== Competitions ==
=== Overview ===
Competition	First match	Last match	Starting round	Final position	Record							
Competition	First match	Last match	Starting round	Final position	Pld	W	D	L	GF	GA	GD	Win %
Premier League	13 September 2020	23 May 2021	Matchday 1	7th	38	18	8	12	68	45	+23	47.37
FA Cup	10 January 2021	10 February 2021	Third round	Fifth round	3	2	0	1	13	6	+7	66.67
EFL Cup	29 September 2020	25 April 2021	Third round	Runners-up	4	2	1	1	6	3	+3	50.00
UEFA Europa League	17 September 2020	18 March 2021	Second qualifying round	Round of 16	13	10	1	2	37	13	+24	76.92
Total					58	32	10	16	124	67	+57	55.17

Last updated: 23 May 2021
Source: Soccerway

=== Premier League ===
==== League table ====
Pos	Team	Pld	W	D	L	GF	GA	GD	Pts	Qualification or relegation
5	Leicester City	38	20	6	12	68	50	+18	66	Qualification for the Europa League group stage (Note: Since the winners of the 2020–21 FA Cup, Leicester City, also qualified for the Europa League based on league position, the second Europa League group stage berth allocated to England was transferred to the sixth-placed team.)
6	West Ham United	38	19	8	11	62	47	+15	65	Qualification for the Europa League group stage
7	Tottenham Hotspur	38	18	8	12	68	45	+23	62	Qualification for the Europa Conference League play-off round (Note: Since the winners of the 2020–21 EFL Cup, Manchester City, qualified for European competition based on league position, the Europa Conference League berth awarded to the EFL Cup winners was transferred to the highest-placed Premier League team not already qualified for European competition, the seventh-placed team.)
8	Arsenal	38	18	7	13	55	39	+16	61	
9	Leeds United	38	18	5	15	62	54	+8	59	

Source: Premier League
Rules for classification: 1) Points; 2) Goal difference; 3) Goals scored; 4) If the champions, relegated teams or qualified teams for UEFA competitions cannot be determined by rules 1 to 3, rules 4.1 to 4.3 are applied – 4.1) Points gained in head-to-head record between such teams; 4.2) Away goals scored in head-to-head record between such teams; 4.3) Play-offs

==== Results summary ====
Overall								Home						Away					
Pld	W	D	L	GF	GA	GD	Pts	W	D	L	GF	GA	GD	W	D	L	GF	GA	GD
38	18	8	12	68	45	+23	62	10	3	6	35	20	+15	8	5	6	33	25	+8

Last updated: 23 May 2021.
Source: Premier League

==== Results by round ====
Round	1	2	3	4	5	6	7	8	9	10	11	12	13	14	15	16	17	18	19	20	21	22	23	24	25	26	27	28	29	30	31	32	33	34	35	36	37	38
Ground	H	A	H	A	H	A	H	A	H	A	H	A	A	H	A	H	H	A	A	H	A	H	H	A	A	H	A	H	A	A	H	A	H	H	A	H	H	A
Result	L	W	D	W	D	W	W	W	W	D	W	D	L	L	D	W	D	W	W	L	L	L	W	L	L	W	W	W	L	D	L	D	W	W	L	W	L	W
Position	15	6	8	6	7	5	3	2	1	1	1	1	2	6	6	5	3	6	5	6	6	8	8	9	9	8	8	7	6	6	7	7	6	6	7	6	7	7

Updated to match(es) played on 23 May 2021. Source: Premier League
A = Away; H = Home; W = Win; D = Draw; L = Loss

==== Matches ====
The league fixtures were announced on 20 August 2020.

13 September 2020 1	Tottenham Hotspur	0–1	Everton	Tottenham
16:30 BST (UTC+1)	Højbjerg (yellow card) 85'	Report	Calvert-Lewin 55'	Stadium: Tottenham Hotspur Stadium; Attendance: 0 Referee: Martin Atkinson

20 September 2020 2	Southampton	2–5	Tottenham Hotspur	Southampton
12:00 BST (UTC+1)	Romeu (yellow card) 5'; Ings 32', 90' (pen.); Adams (yellow card) 39'; Bertrand (yellow card) 44'; Stephens (yellow card) 68'	Report	Ndombele (yellow card) 45+1'; Son 45+2', 47', 64', 73'; Doherty (yellow card) 79'; Kane 82'; Lo Celso (yellow card) 90+3'	Stadium: St. Mary's Stadium; Attendance: 0 Referee: David Coote

27 September 2020 3	Tottenham Hotspur	1–1	Newcastle United	Tottenham
14:00 BST (UTC+1)	Lucas 25'; Winks (yellow card) 90+6'	Report	Shelvey (yellow card) 44'; Joelinton (yellow card) 53'; Lewis (yellow card) 82'; Hayden (yellow card) 90'; Wilson 90+7' (pen.)	Stadium: Tottenham Hotspur Stadium; Attendance: 0 Referee: Peter Bankes

4 October 2020 4	Manchester United	1–6	Tottenham Hotspur	Greater Manchester
16:30 BST (UTC+1)	Fernandes 2' (pen.); Martial (red card) 28'; Bailly (yellow card) 63'; Shaw (yellow card) 84'	Report	Ndombele 4'; Son 7', 37'; Kane 30', 79' (pen.); Lamela (yellow card) 29'; Aurier 51'	Stadium: Old Trafford; Attendance: 0 Referee: Anthony Taylor

18 October 2020 5	Tottenham Hotspur	3–3	West Ham United	Tottenham
16:30 BST (UTC+1)	Son 1'; Kane 8', 16'	Report	Antonio (yellow card) 20'; Ogbonna (yellow card) 72'; Souček (yellow card) 77'; Balbuena 82'; Sánchez 85' (o.g.); Masuaku (yellow card) 90'; Lanzini 90+4', (yellow card) 90+5'	Stadium: Tottenham Hotspur Stadium; Attendance: 0 Referee: Paul Tierney

26 October 2020 6	Burnley	0–1	Tottenham Hotspur	Burnley
20:00 GMT (UTC±0)	Brownhill (yellow card) 2'; Long (yellow card) 80'	Report	Son 76'	Stadium: Turf Moor; Attendance: 0 Referee: Michael Oliver

1 November 2020 7	Tottenham Hotspur	2–1	Brighton & Hove Albion	Tottenham
19:15 GMT (UTC±0)	Ndombele (yellow card) 7'; Kane 13' (pen.); Reguilón (yellow card) 39'; Bale 73'	Report	Burn (yellow card) 45+4'; Lamptey 56'	Stadium: Tottenham Hotspur Stadium; Attendance: 0 Referee: Graham Scott

8 November 2020 8	West Bromwich Albion	0–1	Tottenham Hotspur	West Bromwich
12:00 GMT (UTC±0)	Bartley (yellow card) 44'	Report	Kane 88'	Stadium: The Hawthorns; Attendance: 0 Referee: Andrew Madley

21 November 2020 9	Tottenham Hotspur	2–0	Manchester City	Tottenham
17:30 GMT (UTC±0)	Son 5'; Sissoko (yellow card) 42'; Lo Celso 65'; Kane (yellow card) 90'	Report	Dias (yellow card) 87'; Torres (yellow card) 88'	Stadium: Tottenham Hotspur Stadium; Attendance: 0 Referee: Mike Dean

29 November 2020 10	Chelsea	0–0	Tottenham Hotspur	Fulham
16:30 GMT (UTC±0)	Ziyech (yellow card) 29'; James (yellow card) 53'; Zouma (yellow card) 55'; Mount (yellow card) 76'	Report	Bergwijn (yellow card) 50'; Reguilón (yellow card) 89'	Stadium: Stamford Bridge; Attendance: 0 Referee: Paul Tierney

6 December 2020 11	Tottenham Hotspur	2–0	Arsenal	Tottenham
16:30 GMT (UTC±0)	Son 13'; Lo Celso (yellow card) 41'; Kane 45+1'	Report	Xhaka (yellow card) 75'; Lacazette (yellow card) 80'	Stadium: Tottenham Hotspur Stadium; Attendance: 2,000; Referee: Martin Atkinson

13 December 2020 12	Crystal Palace	1–1	Tottenham Hotspur	Selhurst
14:15 GMT (UTC±0)	Milivojević (yellow card) 20'; Schlupp 81'	Report	Kane 23'; Sissoko (yellow card) 38'	Stadium: Selhurst Park; Attendance: 2,000; Referee: Kevin Friend

16 December 2020 13	Liverpool	2–1	Tottenham Hotspur	Liverpool
20:00 GMT (UTC±0)	Salah 26'; Firmino 90'	Report	Son 33'; Lo Celso (yellow card) 48'; Højbjerg (yellow card) 54'	Stadium: Anfield; Attendance: 2,000; Referee: Anthony Taylor

20 December 2020 14	Tottenham Hotspur	0–2	Leicester City	Tottenham
14:15 GMT (UTC±0)	Dier (yellow card) 79'; Winks (yellow card) 81'	Report	Albrighton (yellow card) 32'; Vardy 45+4' (pen.); Alderweireld 59' (o.g.); Ndidi (yellow card) 72'	Stadium: Tottenham Hotspur Stadium; Attendance: 0 Referee: Craig Pawson

27 December 2020 15	Wolverhampton Wanderers	1–1	Tottenham Hotspur	Wolverhampton
19:15 GMT (UTC±0)	Podence (yellow card) 46'; Coady (yellow card) 58'; Marçal (yellow card) 68'; Semedo (yellow card) 70'; Saïss 86'	Report	Ndombele 1'; Winks (yellow card) 45+1'	Stadium: Molineux; Attendance: 0 Referee: Paul Tierney

2 January 2021 17	Tottenham Hotspur	3–0	Leeds United	Tottenham
12:30 GMT (UTC±0)	Kane 29' (pen.); Son 43'; Alderweireld 50'; Winks (yellow card) 54'; Doherty (yellow card) 64' (yellow-red card) 90+2'; Højbjerg (yellow card) 85'	Report	Phillips (yellow card) 89'	Stadium: Tottenham Hotspur Stadium; Attendance: 0 Referee: David Coote

13 January 2021 16	Tottenham Hotspur	1–1	Fulham	Tottenham
20:15 GMT (UTC±0)	Kane 25'; Højbjerg (yellow card) 64'	Report	Zambo Anguissa (yellow card) 18'; Cavaleiro 74'; Andersen (yellow card) 90+2'	Stadium: Tottenham Hotspur Stadium; Attendance: 0 Referee: Paul Tierney
Note: The match was originally scheduled for 30 December 2020, but was postponed due to safety concerns following a COVID-19 outbreak at Fulham.

17 January 2021 19	Sheffield United	1–3	Tottenham Hotspur	Sheffield
14:05 GMT (UTC±0)	Norwood (yellow card) 23'; Lundstram (yellow card) 50'; McGoldrick 59'; Egan (yellow card) 86'; Ampadu (yellow card) 90+1'	Report	Aurier 5'; Kane 40'; Ndombele 62'	Stadium: Bramall Lane; Attendance: 0 Referee: Andre Marriner

28 January 2021 20	Tottenham Hotspur	1–3	Liverpool	Tottenham
20:00 GMT (UTC±0)	Bergwijn (yellow card) 30'; Højbjerg 49'	Report	Thiago (yellow card) 24'; Firmino 45+4'; Alexander-Arnold 47'; Phillips (yellow card) 50'; Mané 65'	Stadium: Tottenham Hotspur Stadium; Attendance: 0 Referee: Martin Atkinson

31 January 2021 21	Brighton & Hove Albion	1–0	Tottenham Hotspur	Falmer
19:15 GMT (UTC±0)	Trossard 17'; Maupay (yellow card) 71'; Burn (yellow card) 87'	Report	Alderweireld (yellow card) 66'	Stadium: Falmer Stadium; Attendance: 0 Referee: Peter Bankes

4 February 2021 22	Tottenham Hotspur	0–1	Chelsea	Tottenham
20:00 GMT (UTC±0)	Alderweireld (yellow card) 50'; Højbjerg (yellow card) 63'	Report	Jorginho 24' (pen.); Pulisic (yellow card) 79'; Kanté (yellow card) 81'; Azpilicueta (yellow card) 88'	Stadium: Tottenham Hotspur Stadium; Attendance: 0 Referee: Andre Marriner

7 February 2021 23	Tottenham Hotspur	2–0	West Bromwich Albion	Tottenham
12:00 GMT (UTC±0)	Kane 54'; Son 58'; Lamela (yellow card) 64'	Report	Snodgrass (yellow card) 77'; Gallagher (yellow card) 90+3'	Stadium: Tottenham Hotspur Stadium; Attendance: 0 Referee: Stuart Attwell

13 February 2021 24	Manchester City	3–0	Tottenham Hotspur	Manchester
17:30 GMT (UTC±0)	Rodri 23' (pen.); Silva (yellow card) 29'; Gündoğan 50', 66'	Report	Lamela (yellow card) 65'; Dier (yellow card) 77'; Davies (yellow card) 90+2'	Stadium: City of Manchester Stadium; Attendance: 0 Referee: Paul Tierney

21 February 2021 25	West Ham United	2–1	Tottenham Hotspur	Stratford
12:00 GMT (UTC±0)	Antonio 5', (yellow card) 69'; Lingard 47'; Souček (yellow card) 56'; Diop (yellow card) 62'; Fornals (yellow card) 72'	Report	Lamela (yellow card) 36'; Højbjerg (yellow card) 42'; Reguilón (yellow card) 44'; Lucas 64'	Stadium: London Stadium; Attendance: 0 Referee: Craig Pawson

28 February 2021 26	Tottenham Hotspur	4–0	Burnley	Tottenham
14:00 GMT (UTC±0)	Bale 2', 55'; Kane 15'; Lucas 31'	Report		Stadium: Tottenham Hotspur Stadium; Attendance: 0 Referee: Kevin Friend

4 March 2021 33	Fulham	0–1	Tottenham Hotspur	Fulham
18:00 GMT (UTC±0)	Lookman (yellow card) 39'; Reed (yellow card) 90+4'	Report	Adarabioyo 19' (o.g.); Bale (yellow card) 45+1'	Stadium: Craven Cottage; Attendance: 0 Referee: David Coote

7 March 2021 27	Tottenham Hotspur	4–1	Crystal Palace	Tottenham
19:15 GMT (UTC±0)	Bale 25', 49'; Kane 52', 77'; Doherty (yellow card) 90+1'; Carlos Vinícius (yellow card) 90+5'	Report	Ayew (yellow card) 29'; Cahill (yellow card) 35'; Benteke 45+1'; Riedewald (yellow card) 47'	Stadium: Tottenham Hotspur Stadium; Attendance: 0 Referee: Stuart Attwell

14 March 2021 28	Arsenal	2–1	Tottenham Hotspur	Holloway
16:30 GMT (UTC±0)	Ødegaard 44'; Lacazette 64' (pen.); Xhaka (yellow card) 82'	Report	Lamela 33', (yellow card) 69' (yellow-red card) 76'; Reguilón (yellow card) 40'; Sánchez (yellow card) 63'	Stadium: Emirates Stadium; Attendance: 0 Referee: Michael Oliver

21 March 2021 18	Aston Villa	0–2	Tottenham Hotspur	Aston
19:30 GMT (UTC±0)	Cash (yellow card) 74'; McGinn (yellow card) 86'; Targett (yellow card) 90+3'	Report	Carlos Vinícius 29', (yellow card) 83'; Lo Celso (yellow card) 63'; Kane 68' (pen.)	Stadium: Villa Park; Attendance: 0 Referee: Mike Dean
Note: The match originally scheduled for 13 January 2021, but postponed due to a COVID-19 outbreak at Aston Villa's training ground.

4 April 2021 30	Newcastle United	2–2	Tottenham Hotspur	Newcastle upon Tyne
14:05 BST (UTC+1)	Joelinton 28'; Dummett (yellow card) 65'; Shelvey (yellow card) 72'; Almirón (yellow card) 85'; Willock 86'	Report	Kane 30', 34'; Lo Celso (yellow card) 45'; Tanganga (yellow card) 63'	Stadium: St James' Park; Attendance: 0 Referee: Craig Pawson

11 April 2021 31	Tottenham Hotspur	1–3	Manchester United	Tottenham
16:30 BST (UTC+1)	Son 40'; Sissoko (yellow card) 90+2'	Report	McTominay (yellow card) 18'; Cavani (yellow card) 41', (goal) 79'; Fred (yellow card) 48', (goal) 57'; Shaw (yellow card) 68'; Maguire (yellow card) 70'; Greenwood 90+6'	Stadium: Tottenham Hotspur Stadium; Attendance: 0 Referee: Chris Kavanagh

16 April 2021 32	Everton	2–2	Tottenham Hotspur	Liverpool
20:00 BST (UTC+1)	Davies (yellow card) 21'; Sigurðsson 31' (pen.), 62'	Report	Højbjerg (yellow card) 7'; Kane 27', 68'	Stadium: Goodison Park; Attendance: 0 Referee: Michael Oliver

21 April 2021 29	Tottenham Hotspur	2–1	Southampton	Tottenham
18:00 BST (UTC+1)	Ndombele (yellow card) 43'; Bale 60'; Son 89' (pen.); Dier (yellow card) 90+5'	Report	Ings 30'; Djenepo (yellow card) 87'	Stadium: Tottenham Hotspur Stadium; Attendance: 0 Referee: David Coote
Note: The match was originally scheduled for 20 March 2021, but was postponed due to Southampton's involvement in the FA Cup quarter-finals.

2 May 2021 34	Tottenham Hotspur	4–0	Sheffield United	Tottenham
19:15 BST (UTC+1)	Bale 36', 61', 69'; Son 77'; Højbjerg (yellow card) 88'	Report	Egan (yellow card) 18'	Stadium: Tottenham Hotspur Stadium; Attendance: 0 Referee: Andre Marriner

8 May 2021 35	Leeds United	3–1	Tottenham Hotspur	Leeds
12:30 BST (UTC+1)	Dallas 13'; Bamford 42'; Koch (yellow card) 52'; Rodrigo 84'	Report	Son 25'; Reguilón (yellow card) 61'; Lucas (yellow card) 68'	Stadium: Elland Road; Attendance: 0 Referee: Michael Oliver

16 May 2021 36	Tottenham Hotspur	2–0	Wolverhampton Wanderers	Tottenham
14:05 BST (UTC+1)	Kane 45'; Højbjerg 62'; Tanganga (yellow card) 86'	Report		Stadium: Tottenham Hotspur Stadium; Attendance: 0 Referee: Martin Atkinson

19 May 2021 37	Tottenham Hotspur	1–2	Aston Villa	Tottenham
18:00 BST (UTC+1)	Bergwijn 8'; Højbjerg (yellow card) 43'	Report	Reguilón 20' (o.g.); Watkins 39'; McGinn (yellow card) 90+1'	Stadium: Tottenham Hotspur Stadium; Attendance: 10,000; Referee: Craig Pawson

23 May 2021 38	Leicester City	2–4	Tottenham Hotspur	Leicester
16:00 BST (UTC+1)	Vardy 18' (pen.), 52' (pen.)	Report	Kane 41'; Bergwijn (yellow card) 58'; Schmeichel 76' (o.g.); Winks (yellow card) 83'; Bale 87', 90+6'	Stadium: King Power Stadium; Attendance: 8,000; Referee: Anthony Taylor

=== FA Cup ===
The third round draw took place on 30 November 2020 on the BBC with Robbie Savage selecting Tottenham to play away at Marine of the Northern Premier League Division One North West, the 8th tier of the football pyramid. The draw for the fourth and fifth round were made on 11 January, conducted by Peter Crouch.

10 January 2021 Third round	Marine	0–5	Tottenham Hotspur	Crosby
17:00 GMT (UTC±0)	Joyce (yellow card) 78'	Report	Carlos Vinícius 24', 30', 37'; Lucas 32'; Devine 60'	Stadium: Rossett Park; Attendance: 0 Referee: Michael Oliver

25 January 2021 Fourth round	Wycombe Wanderers	1–4	Tottenham Hotspur	High Wycombe
19:45 GMT (UTC±0)	Onyedinma 25'	Report	Bale 45+2'; Winks 86'; Ndombele 87', 90+3'	Stadium: Adams Park; Attendance: 0 Referee: Jonathan Moss

10 February 2021 Fifth round	Everton	5–4 (a.e.t.)	Tottenham Hotspur	Liverpool
20:15 GMT (UTC±0)	Calvert-Lewin 36'; Richarlison 38', 68', (yellow card) 90+2'; Sigurdsson 43' (pen.), (yellow card) 47'; Mina (yellow card) 66'; Digne (yellow card) 90+3'; Bernard 97'	Report	Sánchez 3', 57'; Lamela 45+3'; Kane 83', (yellow card) 90+3'; Alli (yellow card) 88'; Winks (yellow card) 100'	Stadium: Goodison Park; Attendance: 0 Referee: David Coote

=== EFL Cup ===
The draw for both the second and third round were confirmed on 6 September, live on Sky Sports by Phil Babb. On 21 September, Tottenham's third-round game against Leyton Orient was postponed due to multiple COVID-19 positive tests among the Leyton squad. On 25 September, the English Football League issued a statement saying that it "has determined that in line with Carabao Cup Rule 5.1, the Club [Leyton Orient] was unable to fulfil its obligations to complete the fixture by virtue of the Council’s order and shall therefore forfeit the tie" and that "in accordance with Carabao Cup Rules, Tottenham Hotspur have been awarded with a bye to progress to Round Four of the Carabao Cup", where they played Chelsea. The game finished 1–1, and went straight to a penalty shoot-out which Tottenham won 5–4 to progress into the next round. Tottenham won their quarter-final against Stoke City by a 3–1 scoreline to advance to the semi-finals. In the semi-finals, played over only one leg, Tottenham then beat 10-man Brentford 2–0 to progress to the final of the competition, which they lost 1–0 against Manchester City.

September 22, 2020 Third round	Leyton Orient	W/O	Tottenham Hotspur	Leyton
18:00 BST (UTC+1)				Stadium: Brisbane Road
Note: The tie between Leyton Orient and Tottenham Hotspur was postponed after multiple Orient players tested positive for COVID-19. On 25 September, it was confirmed that Tottenham had received a bye into the fourth round, due to Orient's inability to fulfill the fixture.

29 September 2020 Fourth round	Tottenham Hotspur	1–1 (5–4 p)	Chelsea	Tottenham
19:45 BST (UTC+1)	Aurier (yellow card) 59'; Tanganga (yellow card) 61'; Lamela 84'	Report	Werner 19'; Kovačić (yellow card) 45+2'; Jorginho (yellow card) 83'	Stadium: Tottenham Hotspur Stadium; Attendance: 0 Referee: Lee Mason
	Penalties
	Dier (penalty scored); Lamela (penalty scored); Højbjerg (penalty scored); Lucas (penalty scored); Kane (penalty scored)		(penalty scored) Abraham; (penalty scored) Azpilicueta; (penalty scored) Jorginho; (penalty scored) Emerson; (penalty missed) Mount

23 December 2020 Quarter-finals	Stoke City	1–3	Tottenham Hotspur	Stoke-on-Trent
17:30 GMT (UTC±0)	Collins (yellow card) 30'; Thompson 53'	Report	Bale 22'; Davies 70'; Kane 81'	Stadium: Bet365 Stadium; Attendance: 0 Referee: Darren England

5 January 2021 Semi-finals	Tottenham Hotspur	2–0	Brentford	Tottenham
19:45 GMT (UTC±0)	Sissoko 12'; Reguilón (yellow card) 52'; Son 70'	Report	Canós (yellow card) 14'; Janelt (yellow card) 18'; Mbeumo (yellow card) 51'; Dasilva (red card) 84'	Stadium: Tottenham Hotspur Stadium; Attendance: 0 Referee: Mike Dean
Note: For the 2020–21 season, the EFL Cup semi-finals were played over only one leg to reduce fixture congestion caused by the COVID-19 pandemic and the late start to the season.

25 April 2021 Final	Manchester City	1–0	Tottenham Hotspur	London
16:30 BST (UTC+1)	Laporte (yellow card) 45', (goal) 82'; Fernandinho (yellow card) 59'	Report	Reguilón (yellow card) 27'	Stadium: Wembley Stadium; Attendance: 7,773; Referee: Paul Tierney

=== UEFA Europa League ===
==== Qualifying phase ====
The second qualifying round draw was made on 31 August. The draw for the third qualifying round was held on 1 September. The draw for the play-off round was held on 18 September.

17 September 2020 Second qualifying round	Lokomotiv Plovdiv (Bulgaria)	1–2	(England) Tottenham Hotspur	Plovdiv, Bulgaria
18:00 CEST (UTC+2)	Karagaren (yellow card) 51' (yellow-red card) 78'; Almeida (yellow card) 67', (red card) 78'; Minchev 71'; Tsvetanov (yellow card) 78'; Masoero (yellow card) 87'	Report	Kane 80' (pen.); Ndombele 85'	Stadium: Stadion Lokomotiv; Attendance: 0 Referee: Harm Osmers (Germany)

24 September 2020 Third qualifying round	Shkëndija (North Macedonia)	1–3	(England) Tottenham Hotspur	Skopje, North Macedonia
20:00 CEST (UTC+2)	Bejtulai (yellow card) 39'; Nafiu 55'	Report	Lamela 5'; Winks (yellow card) 36'; Son 70'; Kane 79'	Stadium: Toše Proeski Arena (Note: Shkëndija played their home match against Tottenham Hotspur at Toše Proeski Arena, Skopje, instead of their regular stadium Ecolog Arena, Tetovo.); Attendance: 0 Referee: Ali Palabiyik (Turkey)

1 October 2020 Play-off round	Tottenham Hotspur (England)	7–2	(Israel) Maccabi Haifa	Tottenham, England
20:00 BST (UTC+1)	Kane 2', 56' (pen.), 74'; Lucas 21'; Lo Celso 37', 40'; Alli 90+1' (pen.)	Report	Chery 17'; Rukavytsya 52' (pen.)	Stadium: Tottenham Hotspur Stadium; Attendance: 0 Referee: Ruddy Buquet (France)

==== Group stage ====
The group stage draw was held on 2 October 2020.

Pos	Team	Pld	W	D	L	GF	GA	GD	Pts	Qualification	TOT	ANT	LASK	LUD
1	(England) Tottenham Hotspur	6	4	1	1	15	5	+10	13	Advance to knockout phase	—	2–0	3–0	4–0
2	(Belgium) Antwerp	6	4	0	2	8	5	+3	12	Advance to knockout phase	1–0	—	0–1	3–1
3	(Austria) LASK	6	3	1	2	11	12	−1	10		3–3	0–2	—	4–3
4	(Bulgaria) Ludogorets Razgrad	6	0	0	6	7	19	−12	0		1–3	1–2	1–3	—

Source: UEFA
Rules for classification: Group stage tiebreakers

22 October 2020 1	Tottenham Hotspur (England)	3–0	(Austria) LASK	Tottenham, England
20:00 BST (UTC+1)	Lucas 18'; Andrade 27' (o.g.); Son 84'	Report	Michorl (yellow card) 45+2'	Stadium: Tottenham Hotspur Stadium; Attendance: 0 Referee: Mohammed Al-Hakim (Sweden)

29 October 2020 2	Antwerp (Belgium)	1–0	(England) Tottenham Hotspur	Antwerp, Belgium
18:55 CET (UTC+1)	Seck (yellow card) 20'; Refaelov 29', (yellow card) 50'; Verstraete (yellow card) 84'; Mbokani (yellow card) 90'	Report		Stadium: Bosuilstadion; Attendance: 0 Referee: Maurizio Mariani (Italy)

5 November 2020 3	Ludogorets Razgrad (Bulgaria)	1–3	(England) Tottenham Hotspur	Razgrad, Bulgaria
18:55 CET (UTC+1)	Anicet (yellow card) 15'; Keșerü 50'	Report	Kane 13'; Lucas 33'; Lo Celso 62'; Doherty (yellow card) 79'	Stadium: Huvepharma Arena; Attendance: 0 Referee: Fran Jović (Croatia)

26 November 2020 4	Tottenham Hotspur (England)	4–0	(Bulgaria) Ludogorets Razgrad	Tottenham, England
20:00 GMT (UTC±0)	Carlos Vinícius 16', 34'; Ndombele (yellow card) 52'; Winks 63'; Lucas 73'; Højbjerg (yellow card) 90+4'	Report	Keșerü (yellow card) 6'; Despodov (yellow card) 43'	Stadium: Tottenham Hotspur Stadium; Attendance: 0 Referee: Giorgi Kruashvili (Georgia)

3 December 2020 5	LASK (Austria)	3–3	(England) Tottenham Hotspur	Linz, Austria
18:55 CET (UTC+1)	Michorl (yellow card) 33', (goal) 42'; Andrade (yellow card) 45+1'; Karamoko (yellow card) 80', (goal) 90+3'; Eggestein 84'; Wiesinger (yellow card) 86'	Report	Lucas (yellow card) 25'; Bale 45+2' (pen.); Son 56'; Alli 86' (pen.), (yellow card) 88'	Stadium: Linzer Stadion; Attendance: 0 Referee: Paweł Raczkowski (Poland)

10 December 2020 6	Tottenham Hotspur (England)	2–0	(Belgium) Antwerp	Tottenham, England
20:00 GMT (UTC±0)	Carlos Vinícius 57'; Lo Celso 71'; Sánchez (yellow card) 87'	Report	Seck (yellow card) 25'; Ampomah (yellow card) 77'	Stadium: Tottenham Hotspur Stadium; Attendance: 2000; Referee: Jesús Gil Manzano (Spain)

==== Knockout phase ====
===== Round of 32 =====
The draw for the round of 32 was held on 14 December 2020.

18 February 2021 First leg	Wolfsberger AC (Austria)	1–4	(England) Tottenham Hotspur	Budapest, Hungary
18:55 CET (UTC+1)	Liendl 55' (pen.); Sprangler (yellow card) 62'	Report	Son 13'; Bale 28'; Lucas 34'; Alli (yellow card) 42'; Sissoko (yellow card) 54'; Højbjerg (yellow card) 82'; Carlos Vinícius 88'	Stadium: Puskás Aréna; Attendance: 0 Referee: Ali Palabıyık (Turkey)
Note: The match, originally to be played at Wörthersee Stadion in Klagenfurt, was moved to Puskás Aréna in Budapest, due to restrictions related to the COVID-19 pandemic imposed by Austria on travelers from the United Kingdom out of concern of the variant B.1.1.7.

24 February 2021 Second leg	Tottenham Hotspur (England)	4–0 (8–1 agg.)	(Austria) Wolfsberger AC	Tottenham, England
17:00 GMT (UTC±0)	Alli 11'; Doherty (yellow card) 36'; Carlos Vinícius 50', 83'; Davies (yellow card) 65'; Bale 73'; Alderweireld (yellow card) 77'	Report	Baumgartner (yellow card) 61'; Wernitznig (yellow card) 63'	Stadium: Tottenham Hotspur Stadium; Attendance: 0 Referee: Matej Jug (Slovenia)

===== Round of 16 =====
The draw for the round of 16 was held on 26 February 2021. The order of legs was reversed after the original draw to avoid a scheduling conflict with the Arsenal v Olympiacos second leg in the same city on 18 March, as Arsenal were the domestic cup winners and given higher priority over Tottenham.

11 March 2021 First leg	Tottenham Hotspur (England)	2–0	(Croatia) Dinamo Zagreb	Tottenham, England
20:00 GMT (UTC±0)	Kane 25', 70'; Dier (yellow card) 45+2'; Sánchez (yellow card) 79'; Højbjerg (yellow card) 85'	Report	Ademi (yellow card) 69'; Ivanušec (yellow card) 77'; Ristovski (yellow card) 88'	Stadium: Tottenham Hotspur Stadium; Attendance: 0 Referee: Serdar Gözübüyük (Netherlands)

18 March 2021 Second leg	Dinamo Zagreb (Croatia)	3–0 (a.e.t.) (3–2 agg.)	(England) Tottenham Hotspur	Zagreb, Croatia
18:55 CET (UTC+1)	Jakić (yellow card) 32'; Oršić 62', 83', 106'; Lauritsen (yellow card) 80'; Stojanović (yellow card) 90+3'	Report	Lamela (yellow card) 22'	Stadium: Stadion Maksimir; Attendance: 0 Referee: Davide Massa (Italy)

== Statistics ==
=== Appearances ===
Last updated: 23 May 2021.
Source: premierleague.com, uefa.com

No.	Pos.	Name	Premier League		FA Cup		EFL Cup		Europa League		Total	
No.	Pos.	Name	Apps	Goals	Apps	Goals	Apps	Goals	Apps	Goals	Apps	Goals
Goalkeepers
1	GK	(France) Hugo Lloris	38	0	1	0	4	0	5	0	48	0
12	GK	(England) Joe Hart	0	0	2	0	0	0	8	0	10	0
41	GK	(England) Alfie Whiteman	0	0	0	0	0	0	0+1	0	0+1	0
Defenders
2	DF	(Republic of Ireland) Matt Doherty	13+4	0	2	0	1	0	9	0	25+4	0
3	DF	(Spain) Sergio Reguilón	26+1	0	0+1	0	3	0	3+2	0	32+4	0
4	DF	(Belgium) Toby Alderweireld	24	1	3	0	2	0	5	0	34	1
6	DF	(Colombia) Davinson Sánchez	17+1	0	2	2	2	0	10	0	31+1	2
14	DF	(Wales) Joe Rodon	8+4	0	1+1	0	0	0	0	0	9+5	0
15	DF	(England) Eric Dier	29	0	0	0	4	0	6+1	0	39+1	0
24	DF	(Ivory Coast) Serge Aurier	19	2	0	0	3	0	4+1	0	26+1	2
25	DF	(England) Japhet Tanganga	6	0	1+1	0	1+1	0	3	0	11+2	0
33	DF	(Wales) Ben Davies	14+6	0	3	0	1+1	1	13	0	31+7	1
55	DF	(England) Marcel Lavinier	0	0	0	0	0	0	0+1	0	0+1	0
Midfielders
5	MF	(Denmark) Pierre-Emile Højbjerg	38	2	1+1	0	3+1	0	4+5	0	47+6	2
8	MF	(England) Harry Winks	9+6	0	1+1	1	2+1	0	10	1	22+8	2
11	MF	(Argentina) Erik Lamela	5+18	1	2	1	1+1	1	5+3	1	13+22	4
17	MF	(France) Moussa Sissoko	15+10	0	2+1	0	2+2	1	6+4	0	25+17	1
18	MF	(Argentina) Giovani Lo Celso	11+7	1	0	0	1	0	6+3	4	18+10	5
20	MF	(England) Dele Alli	7+8	0	1+1	0	1+1	0	7+3	3	16+13	3
23	MF	(Netherlands) Steven Bergwijn	13+8	1	1	0	1+1	0	5+6	0	20+15	1
27	MF	(Brazil) Lucas Moura	14+16	3	3	1	3+1	0	8+5	5	28+22	9
28	MF	(France) Tanguy Ndombele	28+5	3	1+1	2	2	0	4+5	1	35+11	6
47	MF	(England) Jack Clarke	0	0	0+1	0	0	0	0+2	0	0+3	0
48	MF	(England) Harvey White	0	0	1	0	0	0	0+1	0	1+1	0
54	MF	(England) Alfie Devine	0	0	0+1	1	0	0	0	0	0+1	1
57	MF	(England) Nile John	0	0	0	0	0	0	0+1	0	0+1	0
Forwards
7	FW	(South Korea) Son Heung-min	36+1	17	1+1	0	2+1	1	5+4	4	44+7	22
9	FW	(Wales) Gareth Bale	10+10	11	1+1	1	1+1	1	7+3	3	19+15	16
10	FW	(England) Harry Kane	35	23	0+2	1	3+1	1	5+3	8	43+6	33
45	FW	(Brazil) Carlos Vinícius	3+6	1	2+1	3	0+1	0	5+4	6	10+12	10
53	FW	(England) Dane Scarlett	0+1	0	0	0	0	0	0+2	0	0+3	0
Players transferred out during the season
30	MF	(Portugal) Gedson Fernandes	0	0	1	0	1	0	0	0	2	0

=== Goalscorers ===
The list is sorted by shirt number when total goals are equal.

Rnk	Pos	No.	Player	Premier League	FA Cup	EFL Cup	Europa League	Total
1	FW	10	(England) Harry Kane	23	1	1	8	33
2	FW	7	(South Korea) Son Heung-min	17	0	1	4	22
3	FW	9	(Wales) Gareth Bale	11	1	1	3	16
4	FW	45	(Brazil) Carlos Vinícius	1	3	0	6	10
5	MF	27	(Brazil) Lucas Moura	3	1	0	5	9
6	MF	28	(France) Tanguy Ndombele	3	2	0	1	6
7	MF	18	(Argentina) Giovani Lo Celso	1	0	0	4	5
8	MF	11	(Argentina) Erik Lamela	1	1	1	1	4
9	MF	20	(England) Dele Alli	0	0	0	3	3
10	MF	5	(Denmark) Pierre-Emile Højbjerg	2	0	0	0	2
10	DF	6	(Colombia) Davinson Sánchez	0	2	0	0	2
10	MF	8	(England) Harry Winks	0	1	0	1	2
10	DF	24	(Ivory Coast) Serge Aurier	2	0	0	0	2
14	DF	4	(Belgium) Toby Alderweireld	1	0	0	0	1
14	MF	17	(France) Moussa Sissoko	0	0	1	0	1
14	MF	23	(Netherlands) Steven Bergwijn	1	0	0	0	1
14	DF	33	(Wales) Ben Davies	0	0	1	0	1
14	MF	54	(England) Alfie Devine	0	1	0	0	1
TOTALS				66	13	6	36	121

Last updated: 23 May 2021.
Source: premierleague.com, UEFA.com

==== Hat-tricks ====
Player	Against	Competition	Minutes	Score after goals	Result	Date
(South Korea) Son Heung-min	(England) Southampton	Premier League	45+2', 47', 64', 73'	1–1, 1–2, 1–3, 1-4	2-5 (A)	20 September 2020
(England) Harry Kane	(Israel) Maccabi Haifa	Europa League	2', 56', 74'	1-0, 5-2, 6-2	7-2 (H)	1 October 2020
(Brazil) Carlos Vinícius	(England) Marine	FA Cup	24', 30', 37'	0-1, 0-2, 0-4	0-5 (A)	10 January 2021
(Wales) Gareth Bale	(England) Sheffield United	Premier League	36', 61', 69'	1-0, 2-0, 3-0	4-0 (H)	2 May 2021

==== Own goals ====
Player	Against	Competition	Minute	Score after own goal	Result	Date
(Colombia) Davinson Sánchez	(England) West Ham	Premier League	85'	3–2	3-3 (H)	18 October 2020
(Belgium) Toby Alderweireld	(England) Leicester	Premier League	59'	0–2	0-2 (H)	20 December 2020
(Spain) Sergio Reguilón	(England) Aston Villa	Premier League	20'	1–1	1-2 (H)	19 May 2021

=== Disciplinary ===
The list is sorted by shirt number when total cards are equal.

Rnk	Pos	No.	Name	Premier League			FA Cup			EFL Cup			Europa League			Total		
Rnk	Pos	No.	Name	Yellow card	Second yellow card	Red card	Yellow card	Second yellow card	Red card	Yellow card	Second yellow card	Red card	Yellow card	Second yellow card	Red card	Yellow card	Second yellow card	Red card
1	MF	5	(Denmark) Pierre-Emile Højbjerg	9	0	0	0	0	0	0	0	0	3	0	0	12	0	0
2	DF	3	(Spain) Sergio Reguilón	5	0	0	0	0	0	2	0	0	0	0	0	7	0	0
2	MF	8	(England) Harry Winks	5	0	0	1	0	0	0	0	0	1	0	0	7	0	0
2	FW	11	(Argentina) Erik Lamela	4	1	0	0	0	0	0	0	0	1	0	0	5	1	0
5	DF	2	(Republic of Ireland) Matt Doherty	2	1	0	0	0	0	0	0	0	2	0	0	4	1	0
6	MF	18	(Argentina) Giovani Lo Celso	5	0	0	0	0	0	0	0	0	0	0	0	5	0	0
7	DF	15	(England) Eric Dier	3	0	0	0	0	0	0	0	0	1	0	0	4	0	0
7	MF	17	(France) Moussa Sissoko	3	0	0	0	0	0	0	0	0	1	0	0	4	0	0
7	MF	28	(France) Tanguy Ndombele	3	0	0	0	0	0	0	0	0	1	0	0	4	0	0
10	DF	4	(Belgium) Toby Alderweireld	2	0	0	0	0	0	0	0	0	1	0	0	3	0	0
10	DF	6	(Colombia) Davinson Sánchez	1	0	0	0	0	0	0	0	0	2	0	0	3	0	0
10	MF	20	(England) Dele Alli	0	0	0	1	0	0	0	0	0	2	0	0	3	0	0
10	FW	23	(Netherlands) Steven Bergwijn	3	0	0	0	0	0	0	0	0	0	0	0	3	0	0
10	DF	25	(England) Japhet Tanganga	2	0	0	0	0	0	1	0	0	0	0	0	3	0	0
15	FW	10	(England) Harry Kane	1	0	0	1	0	0	0	0	0	0	0	0	2	0	0
15	FW	27	(Brazil) Lucas Moura	1	0	0	0	0	0	0	0	0	1	0	0	2	0	0
15	DF	33	(Wales) Ben Davies	1	0	0	0	0	0	0	0	0	1	0	0	2	0	0
15	FW	45	(Brazil) Carlos Vinícius	2	0	0	0	0	0	0	0	0	0	0	0	2	0	0
19	FW	9	(Wales) Gareth Bale	1	0	0	0	0	0	0	0	0	0	0	0	1	0	0
19	DF	24	(Ivory Coast) Serge Aurier	0	0	0	0	0	0	1	0	0	0	0	0	1	0	0
Total				53	2	0	3	0	0	4	0	0	17	0	0	77	2	0

=== Clean sheets ===
The list is sorted by shirt number when total clean sheets are equal.

Rnk	No.	Player	Premier League	FA Cup	EFL Cup	Europa League	Total
1	1	(France) Hugo Lloris	12	0	1	1	14
2	12	(England) Joe Hart	0	1	0	4	5
3	41	(England) Alfie Whiteman	0	0	0	1	1
TOTALS			12	1	1	6	20

Last updated: 2 May 2021.
Source: premierleague.com

== See also ==
- 2020–21 in English football
- List of Tottenham Hotspur F.C. seasons
