= Harry Winks =

English footballer (born 1996)

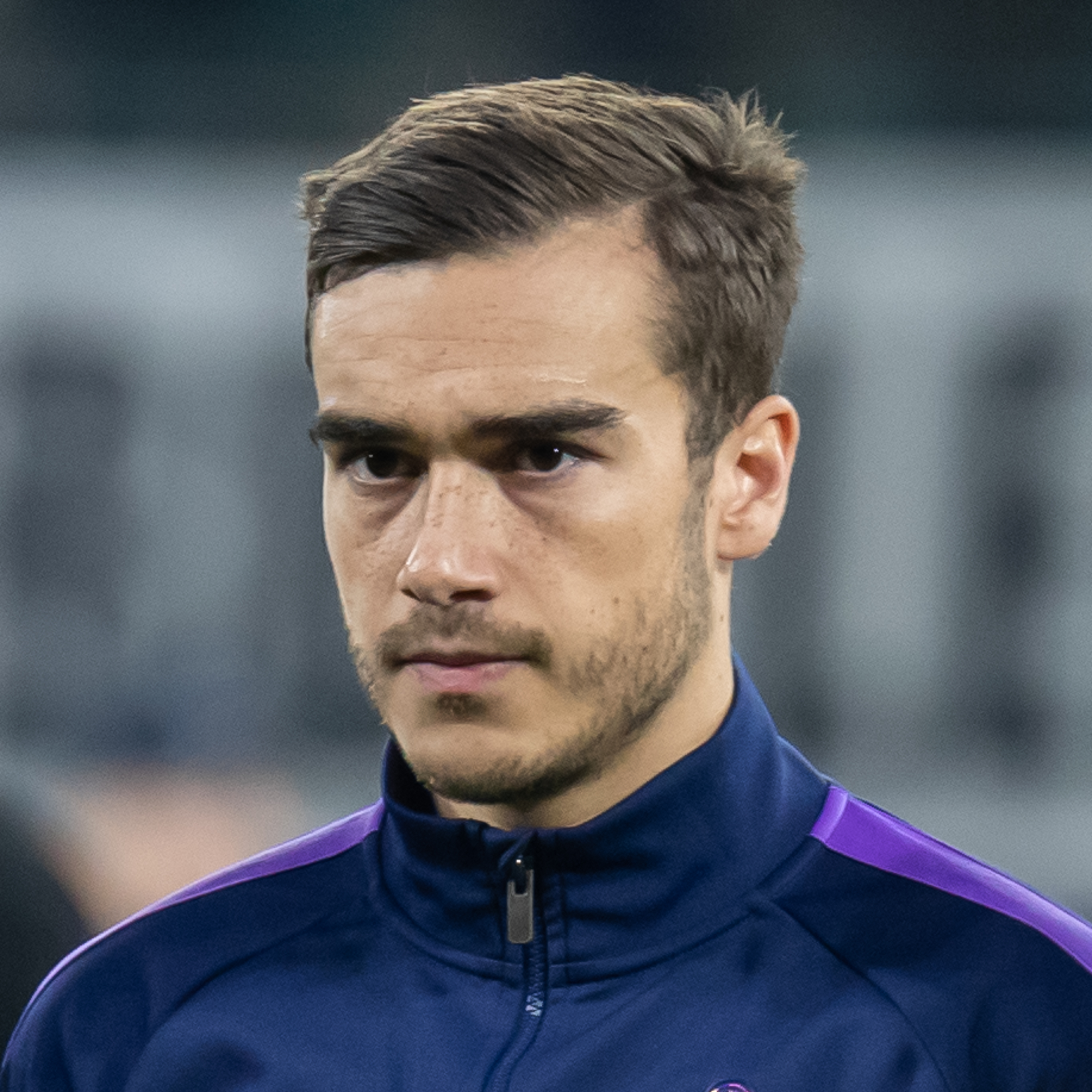
- Winks lining up for Tottenham Hotspur in 2020

Personal information
- Full name: Harry Billy Winks
- Date of birth: 2 February 1996 (age 30)
- Place of birth: Hemel Hempstead, England
- Height: 5 ft 10 in (1.78 m)
- Position: Defensive midfielder

Team information
- Current team: Cagliari
- Number: 6

Youth career
- 2002–2014: Tottenham Hotspur

Senior career*
Years	Team	Apps	(Gls)
2014–2023	Tottenham Hotspur	128	(2)
2022–2023	→ Sampdoria (loan)	20	(0)
2023–2026	Leicester City	101	(3)
2026–	Cagliari	8	(0)

International career
2012–2013	England U17	6	(0)
2014	England U18	2	(1)
2014–2015	England U19	6	(0)
2015–2016	England U20	8	(0)
2016–2017	England U21	2	(0)
2017–2020	England	10	(1)
- * Club domestic league appearances and goals as of 24 October 2026 (UTC)

Harry Billy Winks (born 2 February 1996) is an English professional footballer who plays as a defensive midfielder for Serie A club Cagliari.

A product of the Tottenham Hotspur academy, Winks made his debut for the first-team in November 2014. He went on to make 203 appearances and scoring five goals for the club, as well as starting in the 2019 UEFA Champions League final. After a loan to Italian side Sampdoria for the 2022–23 season, he departed Tottenham in July 2023 after a 21-year association with the club, subsequently joining newly-relegated Leicester City in the EFL Championship. In his first season with Leicester, he won the 2023–24 EFL Championship, earning promotion back to the Premier League.

Having appeared for England across various youth levels, Winks made his senior debut for the England national team in 2017 and went on to win a further nine caps.

== Early and personal life ==
Harry Winks was born to Anita and Gary Winks. He has Spanish ancestry through his maternal grandparents. He was born and raised in Hemel Hempstead and was educated at Cavendish School. Winks is a Tottenham Hotspur fan; he attended his first match at White Hart Lane when he was six. He was invited to train at Tottenham's development centre in St Albans after attending a summer football camp run by an academy coach when he was five, and joined the Tottenham Academy at the same age.

In March 2025 he welcomed a baby girl "Marlowe" with fiancee Lowri Algar, which he shared to his Instagram account.

== Club career ==
=== Tottenham Hotspur ===
==== Early career ====
Winks is a product of the Tottenham Hotspur youth system. During the 2013–14 season, he regularly trained with the first-team squad and was named on the senior bench for the first time in a Premier League tie against Liverpool on 30 March 2014, remaining an unused substitute in a 4–0 loss at Anfield. On 27 July 2014, Winks signed his first professional contract with Tottenham; according to Winks, Mauricio Pochettino said that he wanted to sign Winks immediately after watching videos of his performances. He made his first team debut on 27 November 2014 in the UEFA Europa League group against Partizan in a 1–0 home win at White Hart Lane, replacing Paulinho after 87 minutes.

On 6 July 2015, Winks signed a new contract with Tottenham until 2018, with the option of an additional year. He was given the number 29 shirt, which was included on the club's list of first-team numbers. Winks made his first appearance of the season as a late substitute in a 3–1 win against Qarabağ.

==== 2016–2018 ====
On 27 August 2016, he made his Premier League debut, replacing Christian Eriksen in the last minute of the match in a 1–1 draw at home to Liverpool. On 19 November, Winks made his full debut against West Ham United, performing well and scoring his first ever goal for Spurs to level the match at 1–1. Tottenham went on to win the match 3–2 in a dramatic finish at White Hart Lane after scoring two late goals. Winks made his debut in the FA Cup on 8 January 2017, when he was selected for the team in the match against Aston Villa of the third round. Tottenham went on to win the match 2–0. On 14 February 2017, Winks signed a new contract with Tottenham, keeping him at the club until 2022. During an away match against Burnley on 1 April 2017 in the Premier League, Winks suffered an injury when he tumbled into the Burnley dugout, and was later taken to hospital for a scan on his ankle. Spurs announced on 4 April that Winks would be sidelined by the injury to his ankle ligament for the rest of the season.

Winks began the 2017–18 season as a substitute in three early games after recovering from his injury. He made his first start of the season in the EFL Cup tie against Barnsley that finished 1–0. He next started in the match in UEFA Champions League away game against APOEL, and his performance earned him praise from Mauricio Pochettino as the "perfect midfielder". After only one previous start in the Premier League for the club this season (in a 4–0 win against Huddersfield Town), and four Premier League starts including last season, he gained his first call-up for the national squad. He received plaudits for his performance in the UEFA Champions League game away against Real Madrid, where he was judged to have held his own against Luka Modrić and Toni Kroos. However, he picked up a niggling ankle injury in the match against Crystal Palace on 5 November 2017, which led to him missing final three months of this season after trying initially to play some games through the discomfort. He signed a new contract on 17 May 2018, keeping him at Tottenham until 2023.

==== 2018–2021 ====
After a long period out through an injury that required surgery, Winks returned to the squad in the 2018–19 season in the home game against Fulham, appearing as a late substitute. He made his first start of the season in the game against Liverpool that Spurs lost 2–1. In the away match against Fulham in January 2019, he scored a last minute winning goal to win 2–1, his first goal for the club since November 2016. On 1 June, Winks started in the 2019 UEFA Champions League Final against Liverpool.

Winks signed a new five-year contract with Tottenham in July 2019.

Winks scored his first goal of the 2020–21 season, his first for Tottenham in nearly two years, in the UEFA Europa League match against the Bulgarian side Ludogorets Razgrad to help Tottenham win 4–0. He hit the back of the net from 54 yards away, one of the longest goals ever scored in the Europa League, which he said was not intentional.

==== Loan to Sampdoria ====
On 30 August 2022, Winks joined Italian Serie A club Sampdoria on loan for the 2022–23 season, with an option for the transfer to become permanent. Sampdoria were relegated and his move was not made permanent, returning to Tottenham for a brief period.

=== Leicester City ===
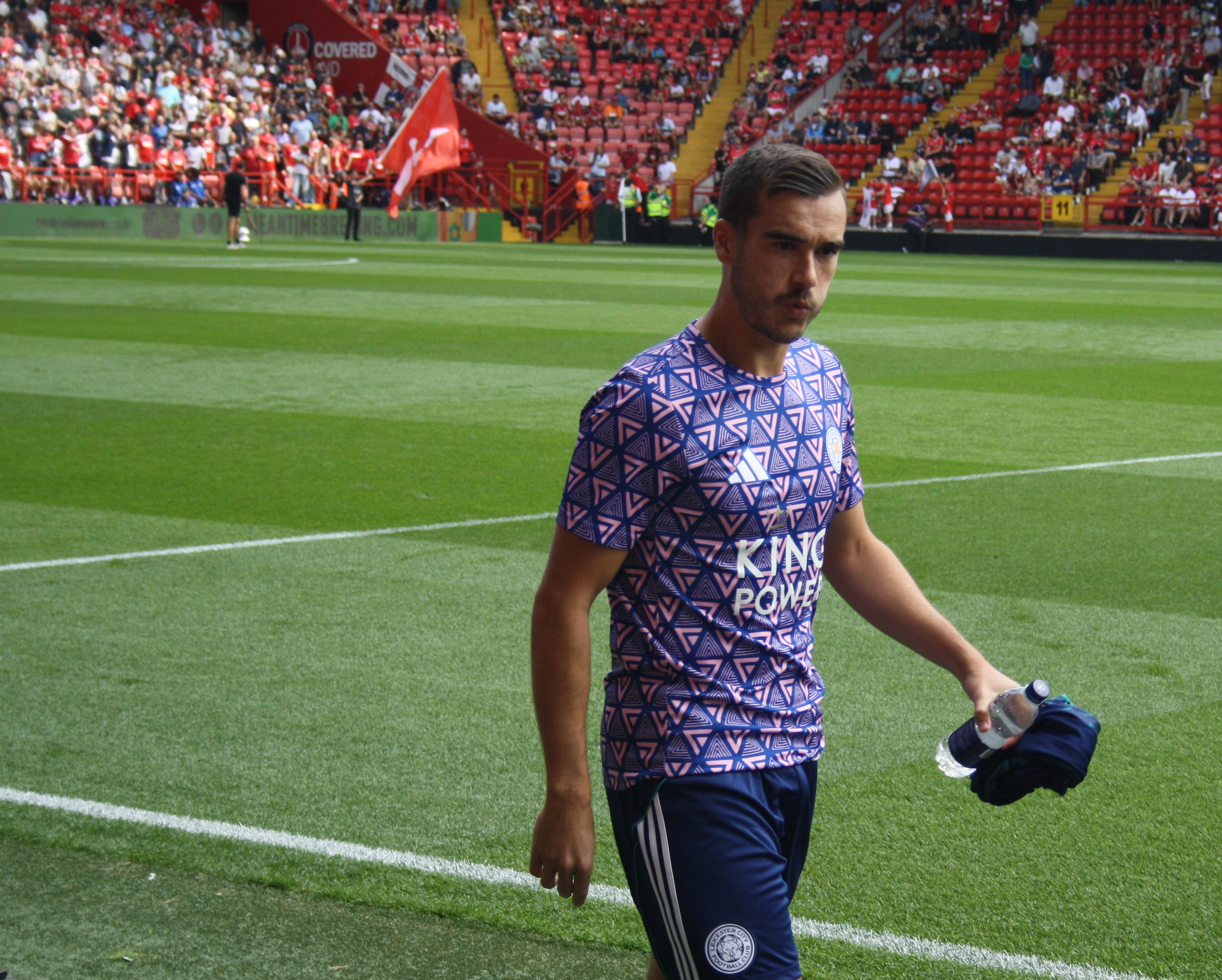
Winks with Leicester City in 2025

On 1 July 2023, Winks joined newly-relegated EFL Championship club Leicester City on a three-year contract, for an undisclosed fee reported to be around £10 million. On 6 August, he made his debut for the club in the opening game of the season, a 2–1 win against Coventry City in the EFL Championship. On 20 September, he made a record of 100 per cent pass completion, while he made the most passes on the pitch, in a 2–0 away win against Norwich City. On 28 October, he scored his first goal for Leicester in the league in a 2–1 away win against Queens Park Rangers, scoring from outside the box in the 80th minute. Winks was a key player in midfield for Leicester and played a significant role in helping Leicester secure promotion. He won his first trophy in his career as Leicester finished as champions in the 2023–24 EFL Championship.

Leicester were relegated from the Premier League in the 2024–25 season. The club suffered a second consecutive league relegation in the 2025–26 season when they dropped from the Championship to the third tier. In April 2026, following a defeat for Leicester against Portsmouth, Winks was involved in a confrontation with Leicester supporters and shouted expletives at one fan outside Fratton Park.

=== Cagliari ===
On 15 July 2026, Winks returned to Italy and signed for Serie A club Cagliari for an undisclosed fee.

== International career ==
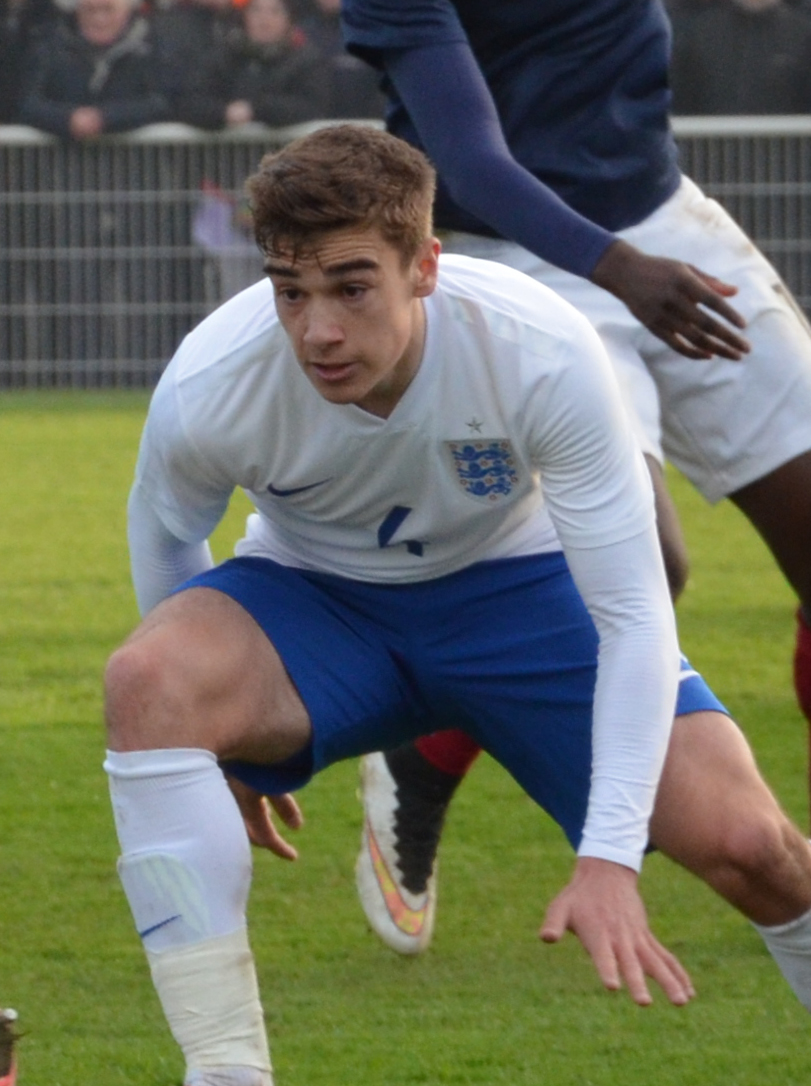
Winks playing for England U19 in 2015

Winks has represented England up to senior level. Before this, he was eligible to represent Spain as well as England. He was part of the under-20 squad for the Mercedes-Benz Elite Cup in Germany in 2015. Winks made his under-21 debut on 14 November 2016 where he started in England's friendly 3–2 defeat to France.

On 2 October 2017, Winks received his first call up to the senior England squad, for their 2018 FIFA World Cup qualifiers against Slovenia and Lithuania. He made his debut when starting in England's 1–0 away win over the latter, which was the team's final match in their successful 2018 FIFA World Cup qualification campaign. Phil McNulty of BBC Sport stated that, on the night, Winks was "England's best performer. Neat and tidy and almost scored. Eye-catching among so much mediocrity". Winks missed the World Cup due to injury, but returned to the England squad in the 2018–19 UEFA Nations League away match against Spain. He helped England to a 3–2 win, the first competitive home defeat for Spain since 2003 and England's first win in Spain in 31 years, in what was judged a "self-assured" performance.

Winks scored his first goal for England on 17 November 2019 in a 4–0 win against Kosovo in UEFA Euro 2020 qualifying.

== Style of play ==
Winks can operate as a central or defensive midfielder. In September 2018, then-Tottenham Hotspur manager Mauricio Pochettino spoke about Winks, saying: "When we talk about midfielders – because you like to use Spanish midfielders like Xavi and Iniesta – he's like this type of player", describing Winks as "completely different to our other midfielders like Victor Wanyama, Eric Dier, Mousa Dembélé and Moussa Sissoko. He has qualities to add to the team that are completely different". Talksport remarked that following his breakthrough for club and country, Winks was "seen as a potential difference-maker for the Three Lions due to his very individual skill set", with Winks earning comparisons with foreign midfielders rather than his English contemporaries.

Former England and Tottenham midfielder Danny Murphy said in September 2018 that the England team should be built around Winks, citing his performance for Tottenham against Real Madrid in the 2017–18 UEFA Champions League group stage as evidence: "The one who I think has got the capability, more than anyone else I have seen, is [Harry] Winks. What he showed in that game in Madrid, in both games when he was fit and at it, was a confidence and an ability to play. To see the passes, to get his foot in and be disciplined and mix that mix of midfield talent that you need [...] for me, Winks is one of the best I've seen when he's at it – in terms of his all-round ability." ESPN FC's Ben Pearce opined in 2018: "England are still missing a deep-lying playmaker [...] Those wondering who could possibly fill the void have obviously forgotten Winks, who excels at keeping possession with quick, short passes".

== Career statistics ==
=== Club ===
As of match played 24 October 2026

Appearances and goals by club, season and competition
Club	Season	League			National cup (Note: Includes FA Cup, Coppa Italia)		League cup (Note: Includes EFL Cup)		Europe		Total	
Club	Season	Division	Apps	Goals	Apps	Goals	Apps	Goals	Apps	Goals	Apps	Goals
Tottenham Hotspur	2013–14	Premier League	0	0	0	0	0	0	0	0	0	0
Tottenham Hotspur	2014–15	Premier League	0	0	0	0	0	0	1 (Note: Appearance(s) in UEFA Europa League)	0	1	0
Tottenham Hotspur	2015–16	Premier League	0	0	0	0	0	0	2	0	2	0
Tottenham Hotspur	2016–17	Premier League	21	1	4	0	2	0	6 (Note: Four appearances in UEFA Champions League, two appearances in UEFA Europa League)	0	33	1
Tottenham Hotspur	2017–18	Premier League	16	0	3	0	1	0	5 (Note: Appearances in UEFA Champions League)	0	25	0
Tottenham Hotspur	2018–19	Premier League	26	1	0	0	5	0	10	0	41	1
Tottenham Hotspur	2019–20	Premier League	31	0	5	0	0	0	5	0	41	0
Tottenham Hotspur	2020–21	Premier League	15	0	2	1	3	0	10	1	30	2
Tottenham Hotspur	2021–22	Premier League	19	0	3	1	3	0	5 (Note: Appearances in UEFA Europa Conference League)	0	30	1
Tottenham Hotspur	Total		128	2	17	2	14	0	44	1	203	5
Sampdoria (loan)	2022–23	Serie A	20	0	0	0	—		—		20	0
Leicester City	2023–24	Championship	45	2	1	0	2	0	—		48	2
Leicester City	2024–25	Premier League	22	0	2	0	1	1	—		25	1
Leicester City	2025–26	Championship	34	1	1	0	1	1	—		36	2
Leicester City	Total		101	3	4	0	4	2	—		109	5
Cagliari	2026–27	Serie A	8	0	2	0	—		—		10	0
Career total			257	5	23	2	18	2	44	1	342	10

=== International ===
Appearances and goals by national team and year
National team	Year	Apps	Goals
England	2017	1	0
England	2018	2	0
England	2019	3	1
England	2020	4	0
Total		10	1

England score listed first, score column indicates score after each Winks goal

List of international goals scored by Harry Winks
No.	Date	Venue	Cap	Opponent	Score	Result	Competition	Ref.
1	17 November 2019	Fadil Vokrri Stadium, Pristina, Kosovo	6	Kosovo	1–0	4–0	UEFA Euro 2020 qualification	

== Honours ==
Tottenham Hotspur

- EFL Cup runner-up: 2020–21
- UEFA Champions League runner-up: 2018–19

Leicester City

- EFL Championship: 2023–24

Individual

- The Athletic Championship Team of the Season: 2023–24
