= 2017–18 Tottenham Hotspur F.C. season =

English football club season

Tottenham Hotspur
2017–18 season
- Owner: ENIC International Ltd.
- Chairman: Daniel Levy
- Manager: Mauricio Pochettino
- Stadium: Wembley Stadium
- Premier League: 3rd
- FA Cup: Semi-finals
- EFL Cup: Fourth round
- UEFA Champions League: Round of 16
- Top goalscorer: League: Harry Kane (30); All: Harry Kane (41)
- Highest home attendance: 84,010 vs Juventus (7 March 2018, Champions League)
- Lowest home attendance: 23,826 vs Barnsley (19 September 2017, EFL Cup)
- Average home league attendance: 67,953
Home colours	Away colours	Third colours

The 2017–18 season was Tottenham Hotspur's 26th season in the Premier League and 40th successive season in the top division of the English football league system. Along with the Premier League, the club competed in the Champions League, FA Cup and EFL Cup. Following the rebuilding of White Hart Lane, Spurs played all home fixtures at Wembley Stadium during this season at full 90,000 capacity. The season also marked a change in kit suppliers as Nike replaced Under Armour.

The season covered the period from 1 July 2017 to 30 June 2018.

== First-team squad ==
Squad No.	Name	Nationality	Position(s)	Date of Birth (Age)
Goalkeepers
1	Hugo Lloris (C)	(France)	GK	26 December 1986 (aged 31)
13	Michel Vorm	(Netherlands)	GK	20 October 1983 (aged 34)
22	Paulo Gazzaniga	(Argentina)	GK	2 January 1992 (aged 26)
Defenders
2	Kieran Trippier	(England)	RB / RWB	19 September 1990 (aged 27)
3	Danny Rose	(England)	LB / LWB	2 July 1990 (aged 27)
4	Toby Alderweireld	(Belgium)	CB / RB	2 March 1989 (aged 29)
5	Jan Vertonghen (2nd VC)	(Belgium)	CB / LB	24 April 1987 (aged 31)
6	Davinson Sánchez	(Colombia)	CB / RB	12 June 1996 (aged 22)
21	Juan Foyth	(Argentina)	CB / DM	12 January 1998 (aged 20)
24	Serge Aurier	(Ivory Coast)	RB / RWB	24 December 1992 (aged 25)
33	Ben Davies	(Wales)	LB / LWB / CB	24 April 1993 (aged 25)
37	Kyle Walker-Peters	(England)	RB / LB	13 April 1997 (aged 21)
Midfielders
11	Erik Lamela	(Argentina)	RW / LW	4 March 1992 (aged 26)
12	Victor Wanyama	(Kenya)	DM / CM	25 June 1991 (aged 27)
15	Eric Dier	(England)	DM / CB	15 January 1994 (aged 24)
17	Moussa Sissoko	(France)	CM / RM	16 August 1989 (aged 28)
19	Mousa Dembélé	(Belgium)	CM / DM	16 July 1987 (aged 30)
20	Dele Alli	(England)	CM / AM	11 April 1996 (aged 22)
23	Christian Eriksen	(Denmark)	AM / LW / RW	14 February 1992 (aged 26)
27	Lucas Moura	(Brazil)	RW	13 August 1992 (aged 25)
29	Harry Winks	(England)	CM / DM	2 February 1996 (aged 22)
Strikers
7	Son Heung-min	(South Korea)	FW / LW / RW	8 July 1992 (aged 25)
10	Harry Kane (1st VC)	(England)	FW / SS	28 July 1993 (aged 24)
18	Fernando Llorente	(Spain)	FW	26 February 1985 (aged 33)

Last updated: 31 August 2017.
Source: Tottenham Hotspur F.C.

== Transfers ==
=== Released ===
Date from	Position	Nationality	Name	To	Fee	Ref.
26 May 2017	MF	(Northern Ireland)	Charlie Owens	Queens Park Rangers	Released	(Note: Following Owens's release he joined Queens Park Rangers.)
9 June 2017	MF	(Slovakia)	Filip Lesniak	Aalborg BK	Released	(Note: Following Lesniak's release he joined Aalborg BK.)
9 June 2017	GK	(Republic of Ireland)	Thomas McDermott	Derry City	Released	(Note: Following McDermott's release he joined Derry City.)
9 June 2017	DF	(England)	Joe Muscatt	Bolton Wanderers	Released	(Note: Following Muscatt's release he joined Bolton Wanderers.)
9 June 2017	MF	(England)	Zenon Stylianides	Queens Park Rangers	Released	(Note: Following Stylianides's release he joined Queens Park Rangers.)
9 June 2017	FW	(Colombia)	Juan Pablo González Velasco	CD Lugo	Released	(Note: Following Velasco's release he joined CD Lugo.)

=== Loans out ===
Start date	Position	Nationality	Name	To	End date	Ref.
7 July 2017	DF	(England)	Connor Ogilvie	Gillingham	30 June 2018	
25 July 2017	GK	(Australia)	Tom Glover	Central Coast Mariners	April 2018	
4 August 2017	MF	(England)	Josh Onomah	Aston Villa	30 June 2018	
25 August 2017	DF	(United States)	Cameron Carter-Vickers	Sheffield United	15 January 2018	(Note: On 15 January 2018 it was announced that Carter-Vickers had been recalled early by Tottenham Hotspur from his season-long loan.)
8 September 2017	FW	(Netherlands)	Vincent Janssen	Fenerbahçe	30 June 2018	
9 January 2018	FW	(France)	Georges-Kévin Nkoudou	Burnley	30 June 2018	
15 January 2018	MF	(England)	Marcus Edwards	Norwich City	11 April 2018	(Note: On 11 April 2018 it was reported that Edwards's loan had been terminated early. He was originally to remain at Norwich City until the end of the season.)
19 January 2018	DF	(United States)	Cameron Carter-Vickers	Ipswich Town	30 June 2018	
22 January 2018	FW	(England)	Ryan Loft	Exeter	30 June 2018	
29 January 2018	MF	(England)	Luke Amos	Stevenage	30 June 2018	
29 January 2018	DF	(England)	Anton Walkes	Portsmouth	30 June 2018	
31 January 2018	FW	(England)	Shayon Harrison	Southend United	30 June 2018	

=== Transfers in ===
Date from	Position	Nationality	Name	From	Fee	Ref.
23 August 2017	DF	(Colombia)	Davinson Sánchez	Ajax	£42,000,000	
23 August 2017	GK	(Argentina)	Paulo Gazzaniga	Southampton	Undisclosed	
30 August 2017	DF	(Argentina)	Juan Foyth	Estudiantes La Plata	£10,000,000	
31 August 2017	DF	(Ivory Coast)	Serge Aurier	Paris Saint-Germain	£23,000,000	
31 August 2017	FW	(Spain)	Fernando Llorente	Swansea City	£12,000,000	
31 January 2018	MF	(Brazil)	Lucas Moura	Paris Saint-Germain	£25,000,000	

=== Transfers out ===
Date from	Position	Nationality	Name	To	Fee	Ref.
12 July 2017	GK	(England)	Luke McGee	Portsmouth	Undisclosed	
14 July 2017	DF	(England)	Kyle Walker	Manchester City	£50,000,000	
15 July 2017	DF	(Argentina)	Federico Fazio	Roma	£2,750,000	
16 July 2017	FW	(Cameroon)	Clinton N'Jie	Marseille	£6,000,000	
29 August 2017	DF	(Austria)	Kevin Wimmer	Stoke City	£18,000,000	
31 August 2017	MF	(England)	Will Miller	Burton Albion	Undisclosed	

=== Overall transfer activity ===
==== Expenditure ====
Summer: ▼£87,000,000

Winter: ▼£25,000,000

Total: ▼£112,000,000

==== Income ====
Summer: ▲£76,750,000

Winter: £0

Total: ▲£76,750,000

==== Net totals ====
Summer: ▼£10,250,000

Winter: ▼£25,000,000

Total: ▼£35,250,000

== Friendlies ==
=== Pre-season ===
On 21 March 2017, it was announced that Tottenham Hotspur would take part in the 2017 International Champions Cup playing against Paris Saint-Germain, Roma and Manchester City in the United States. On 4 July 2017, it was announced that Tottenham would welcome Juventus to play a friendly match in Wembley Stadium. Tottenham Hotspur played a closed door match in Hotspur Way against Leyton Orient on 12 July 2017.

Win Draw Loss

==== Friendlies ====
12 July 2017 Friendly	Tottenham Hotspur	4–0	Leyton Orient	Enfield
12:30 BST	Walker-Peters 11'; Nkoudou 36'; Brown 71'; Miller 77'	Report		Stadium: Hotspur Way; Attendance: 0

5 August 2017 Friendly	Tottenham Hotspur	2–0	Juventus	London
17:30 BST	Kane 10'; Eriksen 52'	Report		Stadium: Wembley; Referee: Martin Atkinson

==== 2017 International Champions Cup ====
23 July 2017 Int. Champions Cup	Paris Saint-Germain	2–4	Tottenham Hotspur	Orlando, Florida
02:00 BST	Cavani 6'; Pastore 36'; Trapp (red card) 46'; Jesé (yellow card) 59'	Report	Eriksen 11'; Dier 18'; Alderweireld (yellow card) 70', (goal) 82'; Kane 88' (pen.)	Stadium: Camping World Stadium; Attendance: 33,322; Referee: Ted Unkel (United States)

26 July 2017 Int. Champions Cup	Tottenham Hotspur	2–3	Roma	Harrison, New Jersey
02:00 BST	Carter-Vickers (yellow card) 40'; Winks 87'; Janssen 90+1'	Report	Perotti 13' (pen.); Kolarov (yellow card) 22'; Ünder 70'; Tumminello 90+2'	Stadium: Red Bull Arena; Attendance: 26,192; Referee: Hilario Grajeda (United States)

29 July 2017 Int. Champions Cup	Manchester City	3–0	Tottenham Hotspur	Nashville, Tennessee
23:00 BST	Stones 10'; Kompany (yellow card) 55'; Sterling 72'; Brahim 90+1'	Report		Stadium: Nissan Stadium; Attendance: 56,232; Referee: Fotiz Bazakos (United States)

== Competitions ==
=== Overview ===
Competition	Record							
Competition	Pld	W	D	L	GF	GA	GD	Win %
Premier League	38	23	8	7	74	36	+38	60.53
FA Cup	7	4	2	1	18	6	+12	57.14
EFL Cup	2	1	0	1	3	3	+0	50.00
Champions League	8	5	2	1	18	8	+10	62.50
Total	55	33	12	10	113	53	+60	60.00

Source: Competitions

=== Premier League ===
==== League table ====
Pos	Team	Pld	W	D	L	GF	GA	GD	Pts	Qualification or relegation
1	Manchester City (C)	38	32	4	2	106	27	+79	100	Qualification for the Champions League group stage
2	Manchester United	38	25	6	7	68	28	+40	81	Qualification for the Champions League group stage
3	Tottenham Hotspur	38	23	8	7	74	36	+38	77	Qualification for the Champions League group stage
4	Liverpool	38	21	12	5	84	38	+46	75	Qualification for the Champions League group stage
5	Chelsea	38	21	7	10	62	38	+24	70	Qualification for the Europa League group stage (Note: Since the winners of the 2017–18 FA Cup (Chelsea) and the winners of the 2017–18 EFL Cup (Manchester City) both qualified for European competition based on their league positions, the berths awarded to the 5th-placed team (Europa League group stage) and the League Cup winners (Europa League second qualifying round) were passed down the league.)

Source: Premier League
Rules for classification: 1) Points; 2) Goal difference; 3) Goals scored. 4) Play-offs (only if needed to decide champion, teams for relegation or teams for UEFA competitions).
(C) Champions

==== Result summary ====
Overall								Home						Away					
Pld	W	D	L	GF	GA	GD	Pts	W	D	L	GF	GA	GD	W	D	L	GF	GA	GD
38	23	8	7	74	36	+38	77	13	4	2	40	16	+24	10	4	5	34	20	+14

Last updated: 13 May 2018.
Source: Premier League

==== Results by matchday ====
Matchday	1	2	3	4	5	6	7	8	9	10	11	12	13	14	15	16	17	18	19	20	21	22	23	24	25	26	27	28	29	30	31	32	33	34	35	36	37	38
Ground	A	H	H	A	H	A	A	H	H	A	H	A	H	A	A	H	H	A	A	H	A	H	H	A	H	A	H	A	H	A	A	A	H	A	H	A	H	H
Result	W	L	D	W	D	W	W	W	W	L	W	L	D	L	D	W	W	L	W	W	W	D	W	D	W	D	W	W	W	W	W	W	L	D	W	L	W	W
Position	4	10	9	5	5	4	3	3	3	3	3	4	5	7	6	6	4	7	5	5	5	5	5	5	5	5	5	4	4	3	4	4	4	4	4	4	3	3

Updated to match(es) played on 13 May 2018. Source: 11v11
A = Away; H = Home; W = Win; D = Draw; L = Loss

==== Matches ====
On 14 June 2017, the 2017–18 Premier League fixtures were announced.

13 August 2017 1	Newcastle United	0–2	Tottenham Hotspur	Newcastle upon Tyne
13:30 BST	Shelvey (red card) 48'; Ritchie (yellow card) 52'	Report	Kane (yellow card) 31'; Alli 61'; Davies 70', (yellow card) 86'	Stadium: St James' Park; Attendance: 52,077; Referee: Andre Marriner

20 August 2017 2	Tottenham Hotspur	1–2	Chelsea	Wembley
16:00 BST	Dier (yellow card) 31'; Vertonghen (yellow card) 51'; Batshuayi 82' (o.g.); Alderweireld (yellow card) 84'; Kane (yellow card) 88'	Report	Alonso 24', 88', (yellow card) 87'; Rüdiger (yellow card) 30'; David Luiz (yellow card) 38'	Stadium: Wembley Stadium; Attendance: 73,587; Referee: Anthony Taylor

27 August 2017 3	Tottenham Hotspur	1–1	Burnley	Wembley
16:00 BST	Alli 61'	Report	Wood 90+2'	Stadium: Wembley Stadium; Attendance: 67,862; Referee: Lee Mason

9 September 2017 4	Everton	0–3	Tottenham Hotspur	Liverpool
15:00 BST	Williams (yellow card) 5'; Gueye (yellow card) 57'; Rooney (yellow card) 88'	Report	Alderweireld (yellow card) 13'; Kane 28', 46'; Eriksen 42'	Stadium: Goodison Park; Attendance: 38,835; Referee: Graham Scott

16 September 2017 5	Tottenham Hotspur	0–0	Swansea City	Wembley
17:30 BST	Alderweireld (yellow card) 88'	Report	Van der Hoorn (yellow card) 63'; Carroll (yellow card) 86'; Routledge (yellow card) 90+3'	Stadium: Wembley Stadium; Attendance: 65,366; Referee: Mike Dean

23 September 2017 6	West Ham United	2–3	Tottenham Hotspur	Stratford
12:30 BST	Hernández 65', (yellow card) 81'; Kouyaté 87'; Ayew (yellow card) 90+3'; Reid (yellow card) 90+6'; Carroll (yellow card) 90+6'	Report	Kane 34', 38'; Eriksen 60'; Aurier (yellow card) 64' (yellow-red card) 70'; Dier (yellow card) 90+6'; Llorente (yellow card) 90+6'	Stadium: London Stadium; Attendance: 56,988; Referee: Michael Oliver

30 September 2017 7	Huddersfield Town	0–4	Tottenham Hotspur	Huddersfield
12:30 BST	Kachunga (yellow card) 65'	Report	Kane 9', 23'; Davies 16'; Alli (yellow card) 58'; Sissoko 90+1'	Stadium: John Smith's Stadium; Attendance: 24,169; Referee: Neil Swarbrick

14 October 2017 8	Tottenham Hotspur	1–0	Bournemouth	Wembley
15:00 BST	Eriksen 47'; Vertonghen (yellow card) 84'	Report	Cook (yellow card) 27'; Smith (yellow card) 38'; Begović (yellow card) 90+3'	Stadium: Wembley Stadium; Attendance: 73,502; Referee: Robert Madley

22 October 2017 9	Tottenham Hotspur	4–1	Liverpool	Wembley
16:00 BST	Kane 4', 56'; Son 12'; Alli 45+3'	Report	Salah 24'; Can (yellow card) 45+2'	Stadium: Wembley Stadium; Attendance: 80,827; Referee: Andre Marriner

28 October 2017 10	Manchester United	1–0	Tottenham Hotspur	Manchester
12:30 BST	Valencia (yellow card) 73'; Martial 81'	Report		Stadium: Old Trafford; Attendance: 75,034; Referee: Jonathan Moss

5 November 2017 11	Tottenham Hotspur	1–0	Crystal Palace	Wembley
12:00 GMT	Son 64'	Report	Townsend (yellow card) 45+2'; Schlupp (yellow card) 56'	Stadium: Wembley Stadium; Attendance: 65,270; Referee: Kevin Friend

18 November 2017 12	Arsenal	2–0	Tottenham Hotspur	Holloway
12:30 GMT	Xhaka (yellow card) 32'; Mustafi 36' (yellow card) 48'; Sánchez (yellow card) 38' (goal) 41'; Monreal (yellow card) 73'	Report	Kane (yellow card) 50'	Stadium: Emirates Stadium; Attendance: 59,530; Referee: Mike Dean

25 November 2017 13	Tottenham Hotspur	1–1	West Bromwich Albion	Wembley
15:00 GMT	Dier (yellow card) 58'; Kane 74'	Report	Rondón 4'; Barry (yellow card) 26'; Gibbs (yellow card) 60'; Nyom (yellow card) 77'; Foster (yellow card) 82'	Stadium: Wembley Stadium; Attendance: 65,905; Referee: Mike Jones

28 November 2017 14	Leicester City	2–1	Tottenham Hotspur	Leicester
19:45 GMT	Vardy 13'; Mahrez 45+1'; Schmeichel (yellow card) 90+5'	Report	Vertonghen (yellow card) 20'; Kane 79'; Lamela (yellow card) 89'	Stadium: King Power Stadium; Attendance: 31,950; Referee: Anthony Taylor

2 December 2017 15	Watford	1–1	Tottenham Hotspur	Watford
15:00 GMT	Kabasele 13'; Cleverley (yellow card) 36'; Kabasele (yellow card) 50'; Zeegelaar (yellow card) 73'; Richarlison (yellow card) 88'	Report	Son 25'; Sánchez (red card) 52'; Vertonghen (yellow card) 71'	Stadium: Vicarage Road; Attendance: 20,278; Referee: Martin Atkinson

9 December 2017 16	Tottenham Hotspur	5–1	Stoke City	Wembley
15:00 GMT	Shawcross 21' (o.g.); Son 53'; Kane 54', 65'; Dembélé (yellow card) 66'; Eriksen 74'	Report	Shawcross 80'	Stadium: Wembley Stadium; Attendance: 62,202; Referee: Roger East

13 December 2017 17	Tottenham Hotspur	2–0	Brighton & Hove Albion	Wembley
20:00 GMT	Aurier 40'; Rose (yellow card) 45'; Son 87'	Report	Knockaert (yellow card) 41'	Stadium: Wembley Stadium; Attendance: 55,124; Referee: Bobby Madley

16 December 2017 18	Manchester City	4–1	Tottenham Hotspur	Manchester
17:30 GMT	Gündoğan 14'; Otamendi (yellow card) 38'; Delph (yellow card) 51'; De Bruyne 70'; Sterling 80', 90'	Report	Kane (yellow card) 52'; Dembélé (yellow card) 62'; Alli (yellow card) 68'; Sissoko (yellow card) 90+1'; Eriksen 90+3'	Stadium: City of Manchester Stadium; Attendance: 54,214; Referee: Craig Pawson

23 December 2017 19	Burnley	0–3	Tottenham Hotspur	Burnley
17:30 GMT	Defour (yellow card) 88'	Report	Alli (yellow card) 4'; Kane 7' (pen.), 69', 79'; Sissoko (yellow card) 57'	Stadium: Turf Moor; Attendance: 21,650; Referee: Michael Oliver

26 December 2017 20	Tottenham Hotspur	5–2	Southampton	Wembley
12:30 GMT	Kane 22', 39', 67'; Alli 49'; Son 51'	Report	Højbjerg (yellow card) 21'; Long (yellow card) 58'; Boufal 64'; Tadić 82'	Stadium: Wembley Stadium; Attendance: 57,297; Referee: Graham Scott

2 January 2018 21	Swansea City	0–2	Tottenham Hotspur	Swansea
19:45 GMT	Olsson (yellow card) 10'; Van der Hoorn (yellow card) 79'	Report	Llorente 12'; Sánchez (yellow card) 31'; Lamela (yellow card) 64'; Alli 89'	Stadium: Liberty Stadium; Attendance: 20,615; Referee: Bobby Madley

4 January 2018 22	Tottenham Hotspur	1–1	West Ham United	Wembley
20:00 GMT	Son 84'	Report	Obiang 70'; Carroll (yellow card) 87'; Noble (yellow card) 90'	Stadium: Wembley Stadium; Attendance: 50,034; Referee: Mike Dean

13 January 2018 23	Tottenham Hotspur	4–0	Everton	Wembley
17:30 GMT	Son 26'; Kane 47', 59'; Eriksen 81'	Report	Jagielka (yellow card) 45'; Rooney (yellow card) 75'	Stadium: Wembley Stadium; Attendance: 76,251; Referee: Craig Pawson

21 January 2018 24	Southampton	1–1	Tottenham Hotspur	Southampton
16:00 GMT	Sánchez 15' (o.g.); Stephens (yellow card) 48'; Romeu (yellow card) 60'	Report	Kane 18'; Sissoko (yellow card) 57'; Dembélé (yellow card) 75'; Trippier (yellow card) 78'	Stadium: St Mary's Stadium; Attendance: 31,361; Referee: Kevin Friend

31 January 2018 25	Tottenham Hotspur	2–0	Manchester United	Wembley
20:00 GMT	Eriksen 1'; Dembélé (yellow card) 13'; Jones 28' (o.g.); Alli (yellow card) 85'	Report	Jones (yellow card) 38'; Young (yellow card) 73'	Stadium: Wembley Stadium; Attendance: 81,978; Referee: Andre Marriner

4 February 2018 26	Liverpool	2–2	Tottenham Hotspur	Liverpool
16:30 GMT	Salah 3', 90+1'; Alexander-Arnold (yellow card) 42'; Milner (yellow card) 58'; Can (yellow card) 90+6'	Report	Alli (yellow card) 69'; Wanyama 80'; Kane 90+5' (pen.)	Stadium: Anfield; Attendance: 53,213; Referee: Jonathan Moss

10 February 2018 27	Tottenham Hotspur	1–0	Arsenal	Wembley
12:30 GMT	Kane 49'; Lamela (yellow card) 79'; Dier (yellow card) 90+5'	Report	Mustafi (yellow card) 73'	Stadium: Wembley Stadium; Attendance: 83,222; Referee: Anthony Taylor

25 February 2018 28	Crystal Palace	0–1	Tottenham Hotspur	Selhurst
12:00 GMT		Report	Dembélé (yellow card) 45+1'; Kane 88'	Stadium: Selhurst Park; Attendance: 25,287; Referee: Kevin Friend

3 March 2018 29	Tottenham Hotspur	2–0	Huddersfield Town	Wembley
15:00 GMT	Alli (yellow card) 20'; Son 27', 54'	Report	Hogg (yellow card) 61'	Stadium: Wembley Stadium; Attendance: 68,311; Referee: Kevin Friend

11 March 2018 30	Bournemouth	1–4	Tottenham Hotspur	Bournemouth
16:00 GMT	Stanislas 7'; Gosling (yellow card) 61'	Report	Rose (yellow card) 18'; Alli 35'; Son 62', 87'; Aurier 90+1'	Stadium: Dean Court; Attendance: 10,623; Referee: Mike Dean

1 April 2018 31	Chelsea	1–3	Tottenham Hotspur	Fulham
16:00 BST	Morata 30'	Report	Eriksen 45+1'; Alli 62', 66'; Davies (yellow card) 70'	Stadium: Stamford Bridge; Attendance: 41,364; Referee: Andre Marriner

7 April 2018 32	Stoke City	1–2	Tottenham Hotspur	Stoke-on-Trent
15:00 BST	Pieters (yellow card) 32'; Diouf 57'; Johnson (yellow card) 71'; Martins Indi (yellow card) 90+3'; Ndiaye (yellow card) 90+7'	Report	Eriksen 52'; Kane 63', (yellow card) 90+4'; Aurier (yellow card) 79'; Rose (yellow card) 90+7'	Stadium: Bet365 Stadium; Attendance: 29,515; Referee: Graham Scott

14 April 2018 33	Tottenham Hotspur	1–3	Manchester City	Wembley
19:45 BST	Lloris (yellow card) 24'; Davies (yellow card) 27'; Eriksen 42'; Dembélé (yellow card) 70'	Report	Gabriel Jesus 22', (yellow card) 45+1'; Gündoğan 25' (pen.); De Bruyne (yellow card) 41'; Kompany (yellow card) 66'; Sterling 72'; Delph (yellow card) 77'	Stadium: Wembley Stadium; Attendance: 80,811; Referee: Jonathan Moss

17 April 2018 34	Brighton & Hove Albion	1–1	Tottenham Hotspur	Falmer
19:45 BST	Dunk (yellow card) 11'; Groß 50' (pen.)	Report	Kane 48'	Stadium: Falmer Stadium; Attendance: 30,440; Referee: Kevin Friend

30 April 2018 35	Tottenham Hotspur	2–0	Watford	Wembley
20:00 BST	Alli 16'; Kane 48'; Wanyama (yellow card) 64'	Report		Stadium: Wembley Stadium; Attendance: 52,675; Referee: Michael Oliver

5 May 2018 36	West Bromwich Albion	1–0	Tottenham Hotspur	West Bromwich
15:00 BST	Hegazi (yellow card) 61'; Nyom (yellow card) 65'; McClean (yellow card) 79'; Brunt (yellow card) 82'; Livermore 90+2'	Report	Rose (yellow card) 65'	Stadium: The Hawthorns; Attendance: 23,685; Referee: Mike Jones

9 May 2018 37	Tottenham Hotspur	1–0	Newcastle United	Wembley
20:00 BST	Kane 50'; Alli (yellow card) 57'; Lamela (yellow card) 89'	Report	Ritchie (yellow card) 73'; Diamé (yellow card) 80'; Yedlin (yellow card) 90+2'	Stadium: Wembley Stadium; Attendance: 54,923; Referee: Neil Swarbrick

13 May 2018 38	Tottenham Hotspur	5–4	Leicester City	Wembley
15:00 BST	Kane 7', 76'; Lamela 49', 60'; Fuchs 53' (o.g.); Wanyama (yellow card) 55'	Report	Vardy 4', 73'; Mahrez 16'; Iheanacho 47'; Choudhury (yellow card) 83'; Silva (yellow card) 90'	Stadium: Wembley Stadium; Attendance: 77,841; Referee: Craig Pawson

=== FA Cup ===
Spurs entered the competition in the third round and were handed a home tie against AFC Wimbledon.

7 January 2018 Third round	Tottenham Hotspur	3–0	AFC Wimbledon	Wembley
15:00 GMT	Wanyama (yellow card) 48'; Kane 63', 65'; Vertonghen 71'	Report		Stadium: Wembley Stadium; Attendance: 47,527; Referee: David Coote

27 January 2018 Fourth round	Newport County	1–1	Tottenham Hotspur	Newport
17:30 GMT	Labadie (yellow card) 32'; Amond 38'	Report	Kane 82'; Foyth (yellow card) 87'	Stadium: Rodney Parade; Attendance: 9,836; Referee: Roger East

7 February 2018 Fourth round replay	Tottenham Hotspur	2–0	Newport County	Wembley
19:45 GMT	Wanyama (yellow card) 8'; Butler 26' (o.g.); Lamela 34'	Report		Stadium: Wembley Stadium; Attendance: 38,947; Referee: Stuart Attwell

18 February 2018 Fifth round	Rochdale	2–2	Tottenham Hotspur	Rochdale
16:00 GMT	Henderson 45'; Rafferty (yellow card) 73'; Rathbone (yellow card) 85'; McGahey (yellow card) 88'; Davies 90+3'	Report	Lucas 59'; Alderweireld (yellow card) 64'; Kane 88' (pen.)	Stadium: Spotland Stadium; Attendance: 8,480; Referee: Bobby Madley

28 February 2018 Fifth round replay	Tottenham Hotspur	6–1	Rochdale	Wembley
20:05 GMT	Son 23', 65', (yellow card) 28'; Foyth (yellow card) 44'; Lamela (yellow card) 45+5'; Llorente 47', 53', 59'; Walker-Peters 90+3'	Report	Humphrys 31'	Stadium: Wembley Stadium; Attendance: 24,627; Referee: Paul Tierney

17 March 2018 Quarter-finals	Swansea City	0–3	Tottenham Hotspur	Swansea
12:15 GMT		Report	Eriksen 11', 62'; Lamela 45+1'; Sánchez (yellow card) 69'	Stadium: Liberty Stadium; Attendance: 17,498; Referee: Kevin Friend

21 April 2018 Semi-finals	Manchester United	2–1	Tottenham Hotspur	Wembley
17:15 BST	A. Sánchez 24'; Valencia (yellow card) 27'; Herrera 62', (yellow card) 90'; Young (yellow card) 71'; Rashford (yellow card) 85'	Report	Alli 11', (yellow card) 50'; Son (yellow card) 28'; Dier (yellow card) 81'	Stadium: Wembley Stadium; Attendance: 84,667; Referee: Anthony Taylor

=== EFL Cup ===
Tottenham Hotspur entered the competition in the third round and were drawn at home against Barnsley. Another home tie was confirmed for the fourth round, against West Ham United.

19 September 2017 Third round	Tottenham Hotspur	1–0	Barnsley	Wembley
20:00 BST	Alli 65'	Report		Stadium: Wembley Stadium; Attendance: 23,826; Referee: Tim Robinson

25 October 2017 Fourth round	Tottenham Hotspur	2–3	West Ham United	Wembley
20:00 BST	Sissoko 6'; Alli 37'	Report	Ayew 55', 60'; Ogbonna 70'	Stadium: Wembley Stadium; Attendance: 36,168; Referee: Mike Dean

=== UEFA Champions League ===
==== Group stage ====
On 24 August 2017, Tottenham was drawn into Group H alongside Real Madrid, Borussia Dortmund and APOEL.

Pos	Team	Pld	W	D	L	GF	GA	GD	Pts	Qualification	TOT	RMA	DOR	APO
1	(England) Tottenham Hotspur	6	5	1	0	15	4	+11	16	Advance to knockout phase	—	3–1	3–1	3–0
2	(Spain) Real Madrid	6	4	1	1	17	7	+10	13	Advance to knockout phase	1–1	—	3–2	3–0
3	(Germany) Borussia Dortmund	6	0	2	4	7	13	−6	2 (Note: Head-to-head results: APOEL 1–1 Borussia Dortmund, Borussia Dortmund 1–1 APOEL (tied on head-to-head results, ranked on total goal difference).)	Transfer to Europa League	1–2	1–3	—	1–1
4	(Cyprus) APOEL	6	0	2	4	2	17	−15	2		0–3	0–6	1–1	—

Source: UEFA
Rules for classification: Group stage tiebreakers
Notes:

13 September 2017 1	Tottenham Hotspur (England)	3–1	(Germany) Borussia Dortmund	Wembley, England
19:45 BST	Son 4'; Kane 15', 60'; Dier (yellow card) 36'; Vertonghen (yellow card) 58' (yellow-red card) 90+1'	Report	Yarmolenko 11'; Toljan (yellow card) 88'; Castro (yellow card) 90'	Stadium: Wembley Stadium; Attendance: 67,343; Referee: Gianluca Rocchi (Italy)

26 September 2017 2	APOEL (Cyprus)	0–3	(England) Tottenham Hotspur	Nicosia, Cyprus
19:45 BST	Waterman (yellow card) 39'; Vinícius (yellow card) 51'	Report	Kane 39', 62', 67'; Winks (yellow card) 85'	Stadium: GSP Stadium; Attendance: 16,324; Referee: Pavel Královec (Czech Republic)

17 October 2017 3	Real Madrid (Spain)	1–1	(England) Tottenham Hotspur	Madrid, Spain
19:45 BST	Ronaldo (yellow card) 32', (goal) 43' (pen.)	Report	Varane 28' (o.g.); Aurier (yellow card) 43'	Stadium: Santiago Bernabéu; Attendance: 76,589; Referee: Szymon Marciniak (Poland)

1 November 2017 4	Tottenham Hotspur (England)	3–1	(Spain) Real Madrid	London, England
19:45 GMT	Alli 27', 56'; Eriksen 65'; Dembélé (yellow card) 89'	Report	Ronaldo 80'; Ramos (yellow card) 90+1'	Stadium: Wembley Stadium; Attendance: 83,782; Referee: Cüneyt Çakır (Turkey)

21 November 2017 5	Borussia Dortmund (Germany)	1–2	(England) Tottenham Hotspur	Dortmund, Germany
19:45 GMT	Aubameyang 31'; Schmelzer (yellow card) 52'; Toljan (yellow card) 90+6'	Report	Kane 49'; Son 76'	Stadium: Westfalenstadion; Attendance: 65,849; Referee: Clément Turpin (France)

6 December 2017 6	Tottenham Hotspur (England)	3–0	(Cyprus) APOEL	London, England
19:45 GMT	Llorente 20'; Son 37'; Aurier (yellow card) 64'; Rose (yellow card) 67'; Nkoudou 80'	Report	Sallai (yellow card) 68'; Rueda (yellow card) 83'	Stadium: Wembley Stadium; Attendance: 42,679; Referee: Slavko Vinčić (Slovenia)

==== Round of 16 ====
13 February 2018 First leg	Juventus (Italy)	2–2	(England) Tottenham Hotspur	Turin, Italy
20:45 CET (UTC+01:00)	Higuaín 2', 9' (pen.), (penalty missed) 45+2', (yellow card) 60'; Benatia (yellow card) 45'; Bentancur (yellow card) 80'	Report	Davies (yellow card) 8'; Kane 35'; Aurier (yellow card) 47'; Eriksen 71'	Stadium: Juventus Stadium; Attendance: 41,232; Referee: Felix Brych (Germany)

7 March 2018 Second leg	Tottenham Hotspur (England)	1–2 (3–4 agg.)	(Italy) Juventus	London, England
19:45 GMT (UTC+00:00)	Vertonghen (yellow card) 28'; Son 39'; Alli (yellow card) 56'; Dembélé (yellow card) 88'	Report	Alex Sandro (yellow card) 35'; Pjanić (yellow card) 44'; Benatia (yellow card) 49'; Chiellini (yellow card) 53'; Higuaín 64'; Dybala 67'	Stadium: Wembley Stadium; Attendance: 84,010; Referee: Szymon Marciniak (Poland)

== Statistics ==
=== Appearances ===
Last updated: 20 May 2018.
Source: Tottenham Hotspur F.C.

No.	Pos.	Name	Premier League		FA Cup		EFL Cup		Champions League		Total	
No.	Pos.	Name	Apps	Goals	Apps	Goals	Apps	Goals	Apps	Goals	Apps	Goals
Goalkeepers
1	GK	(France) Hugo Lloris	36	0	0	0	0	0	7	0	43	0
13	GK	(Netherlands) Michel Vorm	1	0	7	0	2	0	1	0	11	0
22	GK	(Argentina) Paulo Gazzaniga	1	0	0	0	0	0	0	0	1	0
Defenders
2	DF	(England) Kieran Trippier	21+3	0	6	0	2	0	3	0	32+3	0
3	DF	(England) Danny Rose	9+1	0	3	0	1	0	3+1	0	16+2	0
4	DF	(Belgium) Toby Alderweireld	13+1	0	2	0	1	0	4	0	20+1	0
5	DF	(Belgium) Jan Vertonghen	36	0	4	1	1	0	6	0	47	1
6	DF	(Colombia) Davinson Sánchez	29+2	0	2	0	0	0	8	0	39+2	0
21	DF	(Argentina) Juan Foyth	0	0	5	0	2	0	1	0	8	0
24	DF	(Ivory Coast) Serge Aurier	16+1	2	1	0	0	0	6	0	23+1	2
33	DF	(Wales) Ben Davies	26+3	2	2+1	0	1	0	5	0	34+4	2
37	DF	(England) Kyle Walker-Peters	2+1	0	2+2	1	1	0	0+1	0	5+4	1
Midfielders
11	MF	(Argentina) Erik Lamela	7+18	2	4+2	2	0	0	1+1	0	12+21	4
12	MF	(Kenya) Victor Wanyama	8+10	1	4+1	0	0	0	0+1	0	12+12	1
14	MF	(France) Georges-Kévin Nkoudou	0+1	0	0	0	0+2	0	1+1	1	1+4	1
15	MF	(England) Eric Dier	32+2	0	4	0	1+1	0	7	0	44+3	0
17	MF	(France) Moussa Sissoko	15+18	1	6	0	2	1	3+3	0	26+21	2
19	MF	(Belgium) Mousa Dembélé	21+7	0	3+1	0	1+1	0	3+3	0	28+12	0
20	MF	(England) Dele Alli	34+2	9	1+6	1	2	2	5	2	42+8	14
23	MF	(Denmark) Christian Eriksen	37	10	2+1	2	0+1	0	6	2	45+2	14
27	MF	(Brazil) Lucas Moura	2+4	0	3+1	1	0	0	0+1	0	5+6	1
29	MF	(England) Harry Winks	9+7	0	3	0	1	0	5	0	18+7	0
42	MF	(Cyprus) Anthony Georgiou	0	0	0	0	0	0	0+1	0	0+1	0
46	MF	(England) Tashan Oakley-Boothe	0	0	0	0	0+1	0	0	0	0+1	0
Forwards
7	FW	(South Korea) Son Heung-min	27+10	12	5+2	2	2	0	5+2	4	39+14	18
9	FW	(Netherlands) Vincent Janssen	0+1	0	0	0	0	0	0	0	0+1	0
10	FW	(England) Harry Kane	35+2	30	3+1	4	0	0	7	7	45+3	41
18	FW	(Spain) Fernando Llorente	1+15	1	5+1	3	2	0	2+5	1	10+21	5
54	FW	(England) Kazaiah Sterling	0	0	0	0	0	0	0+1	0	0+1	0
Players transferred out during the season.
27	DF	(Austria) Kevin Wimmer	0	0	0	0	0	0	0	0	0	0

=== Goal scorers ===
The list is sorted by shirt number when total goals are equal.

Rnk	Pos	No.	Player	Premier League	FA Cup	EFL Cup	Champions League	Total
1	FW	10	(England) Harry Kane	30	4	0	7	41
2	FW	7	(South Korea) Son Heung-min	12	2	0	4	18
3	MF	20	(England) Dele Alli	9	1	2	2	14
3	MF	23	(Denmark) Christian Eriksen	10	2	0	2	14
5	FW	18	(Spain) Fernando Llorente	1	3	0	1	5
6	MF	11	(Argentina) Erik Lamela	2	2	0	0	4
7	MF	17	(France) Moussa Sissoko	1	0	1	0	2
7	DF	24	(Ivory Coast) Serge Aurier	2	0	0	0	2
7	DF	33	(Wales) Ben Davies	2	0	0	0	2
10	DF	5	(Belgium) Jan Vertonghen	0	1	0	0	1
10	MF	12	(Kenya) Victor Wanyama	1	0	0	0	1
10	MF	14	(France) Georges-Kévin Nkoudou	0	0	0	1	1
10	FW	27	(Brazil) Lucas Moura	0	1	0	0	1
10	DF	37	(England) Kyle Walker-Peters	0	1	0	0	1
TOTALS				70	17	3	17	107

Last updated: 13 May 2018.
Source: Tottenham Hotspur F.C.

==== Hat-tricks ====
Player	Against	Competition	Minutes	Score after goals	Result	Date
(England) Harry Kane	(Cyprus) APOEL Nicosia	Champions League	39', 62', 67'	0–1, 0–2, 0-3	0-3 (A)	26 September 2017
(England) Harry Kane	(England) Burnley	Premier League	7', 69', 79'	0-1, 0-2, 0-3	0-3 (A)	23 December 2017
(England) Harry Kane	(England) Southampton	Premier League	22', 39', 67'	1-0, 2-0, 5-1	5-2 (H)	26 December 2017
(Spain) Fernando Llorente	(England) Rochdale	FA Cup	47', 53', 59'	2-1, 3-1, 4-1	6-1 (H)	28 February 2018

==== Own goals ====
Player	Against	Competition	Minute	Score after own goal	Result	Date
(Colombia) Davinson Sánchez	(England) Southampton	Premier League	15'	1-0	1-1 (A)	21 January 2018

=== Clean sheets ===
The list is sorted by shirt number when total clean sheets are equal.

Rnk	No.	Player	Premier League	FA Cup	EFL Cup	Champions League	Total
1	1	(France) Hugo Lloris	13	0	0	1	14
2	13	(Netherlands) Michel Vorm	0	3	1	1	5
3	22	(Argentina) Paulo Gazzaniga	1	0	0	0	1

Last updated: 9 May 2018.
Source: Tottenham Hotspur F.C.
