= 2021 CONCACAF Champions League final =

2021 edition of the CONCACAF Champions League final

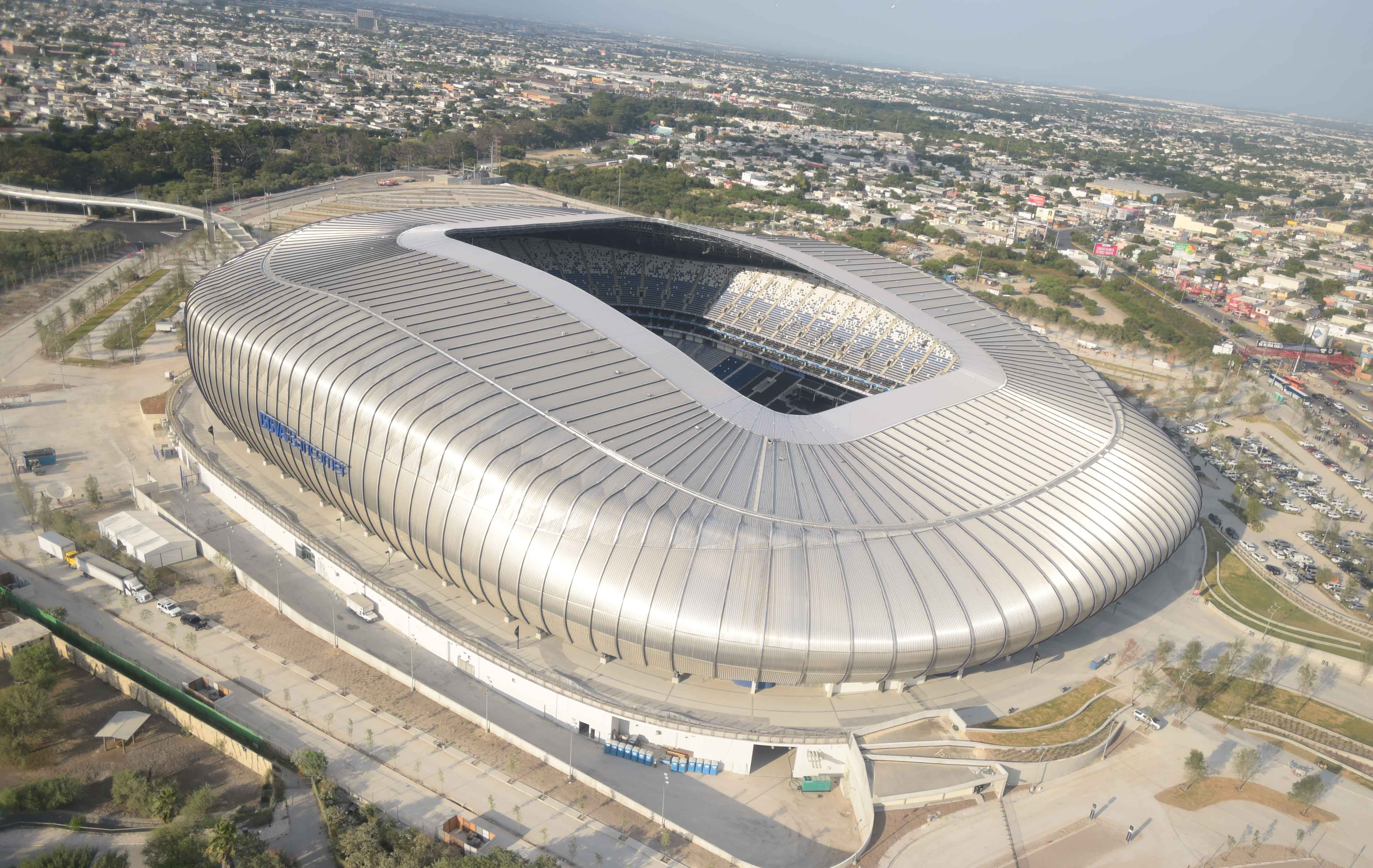
- Estadio BBVA in Guadalupe, Nuevo León hosted the match.
- Event: 2021 CONCACAF Champions League
Monterrey	América
(Mexico)	(Mexico)
1	0
- Date: 28 October 2021
- Venue: Estadio BBVA, Guadalupe
- Referee: Fernando Hernández (Mexico)
- Attendance: 40,170

The 2021 CONCACAF Champions League final was the final match of the 2021 CONCACAF Champions League, the 13th edition of the CONCACAF Champions League under its current name, and overall the 56th edition of the premier association football club competition organized by CONCACAF, the regional governing body of North America, Central America and the Caribbean.

The match was played at Estadio BBVA in Guadalupe, between Monterrey and América. Monterrey won 1–0 for their fifth Champions League title.

As of 2025, this is the most recent Champions League final to feature an all-Mexican final.

== Teams ==
In the following table, final until 2008 were in the CONCACAF Champions' Cup era, since 2009 were in the CONCACAF Champions League era.

Team	Zone	Previous final appearances (bold indicates winners)
(Mexico) Monterrey	North America (NAFU)	4 (**2011**, **2012**, **2013**, **2019**)
(Mexico) América	North America (NAFU)	2 (**2015**, **2016**)

== Venue ==
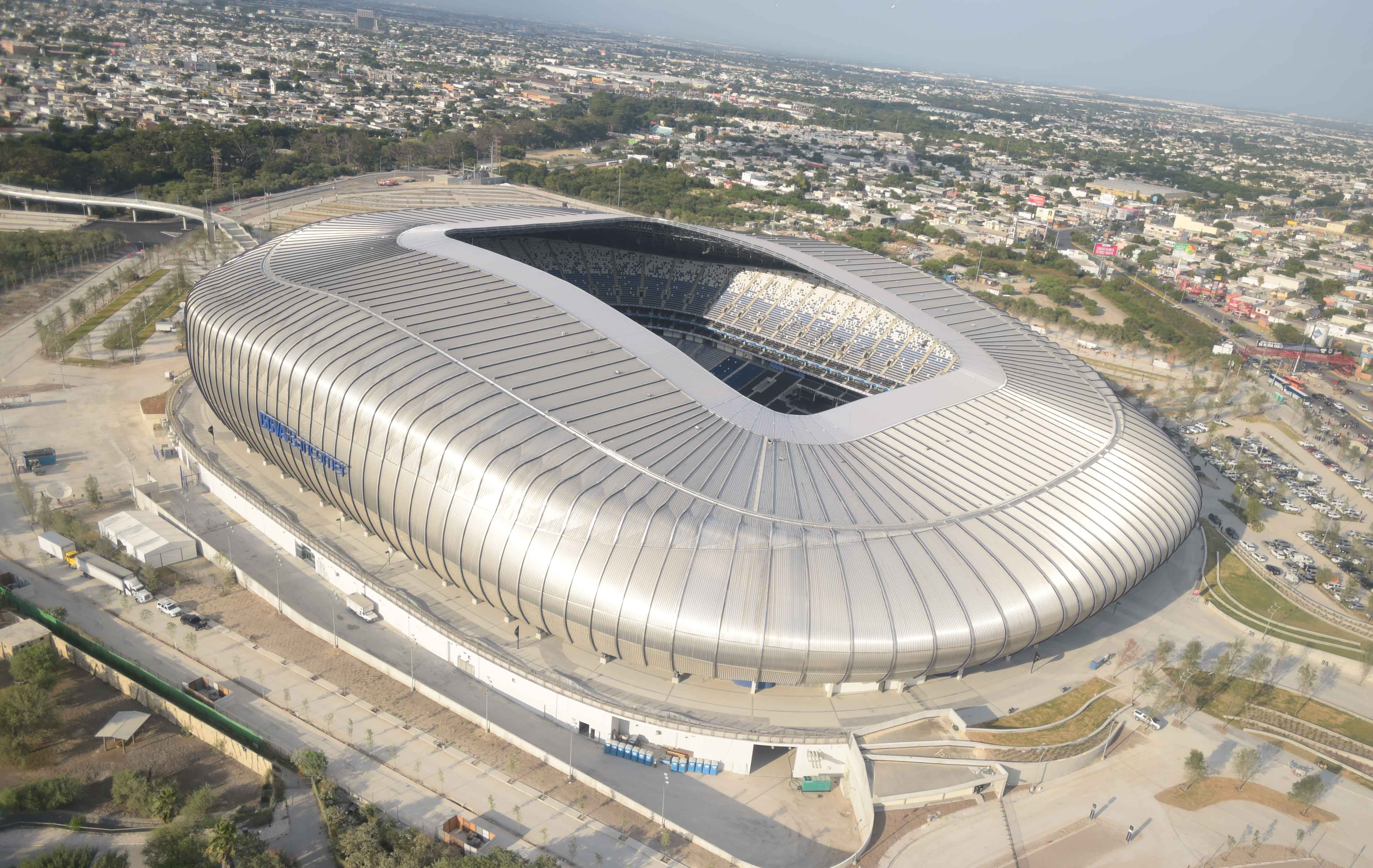
Estadio BBVA in Guadalupe hosted the final.

The higher ranked team, Monterrey, hosted the final match of the 2021 CONCACAF Champions League in Guadalupe, Nuevo León.

=== Host selection ===
In the final (Winners of SF1 vs. Winners of SF2), the finalist which had the better performances in previous rounds hosted the single-leg match.

Pos	Team	Pld	W	D	L	GF	GA	GD	Pts	Final
1	(Mexico) Monterrey	6	5	1	0	16	4	+12	**16**	Host
2	(Mexico) América	6	4	1	1	10	4	+6	**13**	

Source: CONCACAF
Rules for classification: 1) Points; 2) Goal difference; 3) Goals scored; 4) Away goals scored; 5) Wins; 6) Away wins; 7) Disciplinary points; 8) Drawing of lots.

== Background ==
The CONCACAF Champions League was established in 2008 as the continental championship for football clubs in North America, Central America, and the Caribbean, succeeding the CONCACAF Champions' Cup. During its first nine editions, the Champions League consisted of a group stage in summer and autumn followed by a knockout stage during the following spring. Beginning with the 2018 edition of the tournament, the group stage was re-formed as the CONCACAF League and limited to Central American and Caribbean teams. The Champions League was shortened to a two-month knockout tournament between teams from North American and major Central American nations, as well as the winner of the CONCACAF League.

== Road to the final ==
Note: In all results below, the score of the finalist is given first (H: Home; A: Away).

(Mexico) América				Round	(Mexico) Monterrey			
Opponent	Agg.	1st leg	2nd leg		Opponent	Agg.	1st leg	2nd leg
(Honduras) Olimpia	2–2 (a)	1–2 (A)	0–1 (H)	Round of 16	(Dominican Republic) Atlético Pantoja	6–1	0–3 (A)	3–1 (H)
(United States) Portland Timbers	4–2	1–1 (A)	3–1 (H)	Quarter-finals	(United States) Columbus Crew	5–2	2–2 (A)	3–0 (H)
(United States) Philadelphia Union	4–0	2–0 (H)	0–2 (A)	Semi-finals	(Mexico) Cruz Azul	5–1	1–0 (A)	1–4 (H)

== Format ==
While the rest of the tournament was played as a home-and-away two-legged match pairing, the final was a single-leg match where the winner would be crowned the champion. The "home" team for the match was the team with the better performance in previous rounds. In the final, extra time was played if the score was tied after the end of the match. If the score was still tied after extra time, a penalty shoot-out was used to determine the winner (Regulations Article 12.8).

== Match ==
=== Details ===
28 October 2021
22:00 (21:00 UTC−5)

Monterrey (Mexico)	1–0	(Mexico) América
Funes Mori 9'	Report

Estadio BBVA, Guadalupe
Attendance: 40,170
Referee: Fernando Hernández (Mexico)

**Monterrey**	**América**

GK	31	(Argentina) Esteban Andrada
RB	33	(Colombia) Stefan Medina (c)	(yellow card) 90+10'
CB	3	(Mexico) César Montes
CB	15	(Mexico) Héctor Moreno
LB	20	(Chile) Sebastián Vegas
CM	16	(Paraguay) Celso Ortiz	(yellow card) 39'	(substituted off) 71'
CM	29	(Mexico) Carlos Rodríguez
RW	11	(Argentina) Maximiliano Meza
AM	21	(Mexico) Alfonso González		(substituted off) 90'
LW	17	(Mexico) Jesús Gallardo
CF	7	(Mexico) Rogelio Funes Mori		(substituted off) 75'
Substitutes:
GK	22	(Mexico) Luis Cárdenas
DF	6	(Mexico) Edson Gutiérrez
DF	14	(Mexico) Érick Aguirre		(substituted on) 90'
MF	5	(Argentina) Matías Kranevitter		(substituted on) 71'
FW	9	(Netherlands) Vincent Janssen		(substituted on) 75'
FW	95	(Mexico) Kaleth Hernández
FW	99	(Mexico) Alfonso Alvarado
Manager:
(Mexico) Javier Aguirre

GK	13	(Mexico) Guillermo Ochoa (c)
RB	3	(Mexico) Jorge Sánchez	(yellow card) 90+10'
CB	18	(Paraguay) Bruno Valdez
CB	4	(Uruguay) Sebastián Cáceres	(yellow card) 21'
LB	2	(Mexico) Luis Fuentes		(substituted off) 55'
RM	12	(Mexico) Mario Osuna
CM	20	(Paraguay) Richard Sánchez		(substituted off) 67'
LM	22	(Spain) Álvaro Fidalgo
RF	9	(Colombia) Roger Martínez	(yellow card) 68'	(substituted off) 81'
CF	21	(Mexico) Henry Martín
LF	26	(Mexico) Salvador Reyes	(yellow card) 59'
Substitutes:
GK	27	(Mexico) Óscar Jiménez
DF	19	(Argentina) Emanuel Aguilera
DF	25	(Mexico) Jordan Silva
MF	10	(Mexico) Sebastián Córdova		(substituted on) 55'
MF	14	(Colombia) Nicolás Benedetti
MF	23	(Guatemala) Antonio López		(substituted on) 67'
FW	24	(Uruguay) Federico Viñas		(substituted on) 81'
Manager:
(Argentina) Santiago Solari

== See also ==
- 2021 CONCACAF League Final
