= 2021 CONCACAF Champions League =

56th edition of premier club football tournament organized by CONCACAF

2021 Scotiabank CONCACAF Champions League
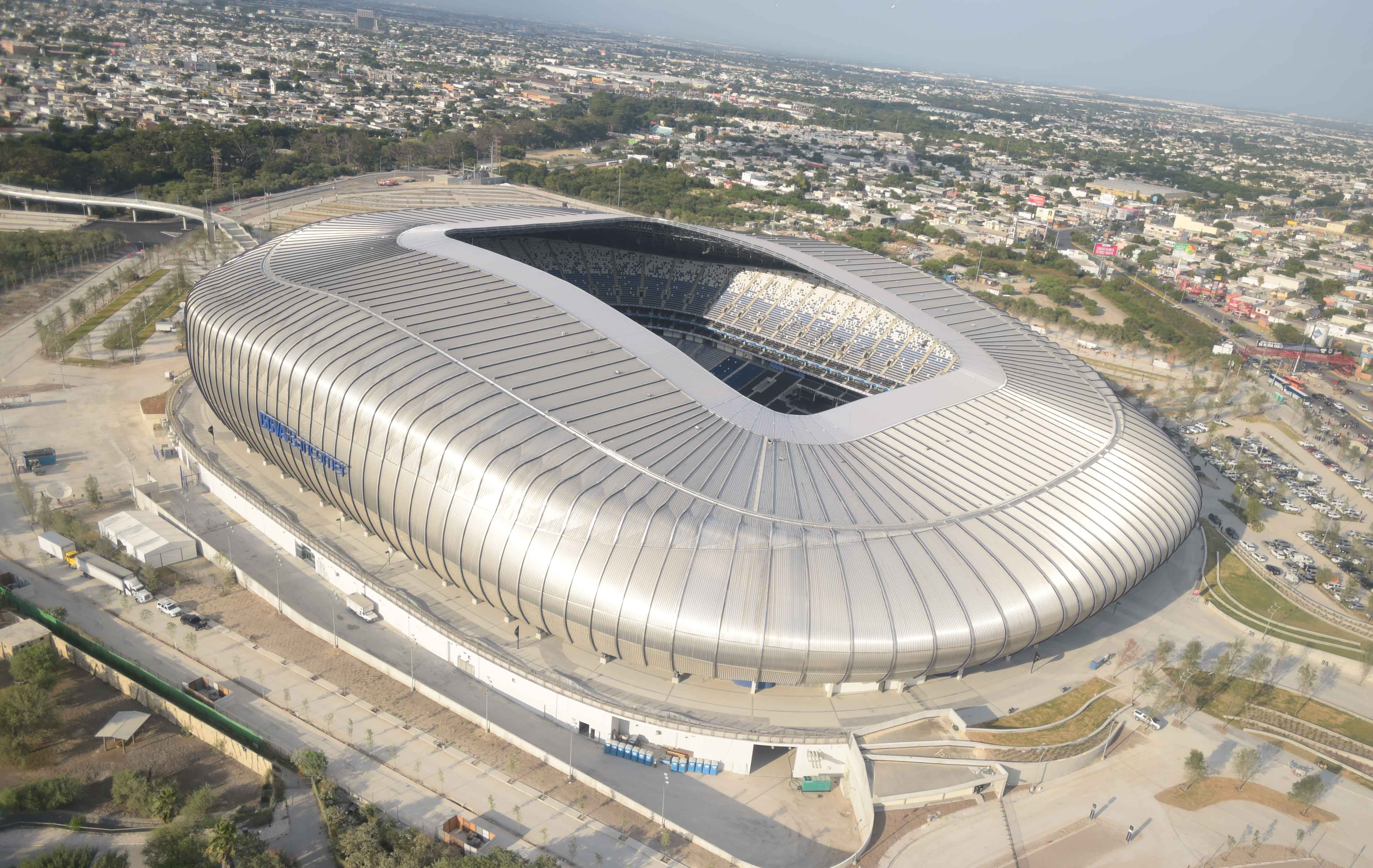
- Estadio BBVA in Guadalupe hosted the final

Tournament details
- Dates: 6 April – 28 October
- Teams: 16 (from 8 associations)

Final positions
- Champions: (Mexican Football Federation) Monterrey (5th title)
- Runners-up: (Mexican Football Federation) América

Tournament statistics
- Matches played: 29
- Goals scored: 79 (2.72 per match)
- Top scorer(s): (Poland) Kacper Przybyłko (5 goals)
- Best player: (Mexico) Rogelio Funes Mori
- Best young player: (Uruguay) Federico Viñas
- Best goalkeeper: (Mexico) Guillermo Ochoa
- Fair play award: (Mexico) Monterrey

The 2021 CONCACAF Champions League (officially the 2021 Scotiabank CONCACAF Champions League for sponsorship reasons) was the 13th edition of the CONCACAF Champions League under its current name, and overall the 56th edition of the premier football club competition organized by CONCACAF, the regional governing body of North America, Central America, and the Caribbean.

Due to the COVID-19 pandemic, the tournament, which usually starts in mid-February each year, was started in April, and concluded with the final in October, which was played as a single-leg match hosted by the finalist which had the better performances in previous rounds.

Mexican club Tigres UANL were the title holders, but did not qualify for this tournament and were unable to defend their title. Monterrey, also from Mexico, won their fifth CONCACAF Champions League title, defeating fellow Mexican club América in the final to qualify for the 2021 FIFA Club World Cup.

This was the most recent final to have featured two Mexican teams until the 2026 edition.

== Qualification ==
A total of 16 teams participated in the CONCACAF Champions League:

- Ten teams which directly qualified for the tournament:
  - North American Zone: 9 teams (from three associations)
  - Caribbean Zone: 1 team (from one association)
- Six teams qualified through the CONCACAF League (from between two and six associations)

Therefore, teams from between 6 and 10 out of the 41 CONCACAF member associations could participate in the CONCACAF Champions League.

=== North America ===
The nine direct berths for the North American Football Union (NAFU), which consisted of three member associations, were allocated as follows: four berths each for Mexico and the United States, and one berth for Canada.

For Mexico, the champions and runners-up of the Liga MX Apertura and Clausura Liguilla tournaments qualified for the CONCACAF Champions League. For the Apertura tournament, the playoff winners and runners-up qualified, while for the Clausura tournament, no playoffs were held due to the league's suspension; the two highest ranked teams in the regular season at the time of suspension instead qualified. If there were any teams which were finalists of both tournaments, the vacated berth was reallocated using a formula, based on regular season records, that ensured that two teams qualified via each tournament.

For the United States, four teams qualified for the CONCACAF Champions League, two through the Major League Soccer (MLS) season and two through its domestic cup competitions:

- The champions of the MLS Cup, the championship match of the MLS Cup Playoffs.
- The champions of the Supporters' Shield, awarded to the team with the best MLS regular season record.
- The champions of the MLS is Back Tournament (for 2021 CONCACAF Champions League only, replacing the MLS regular season champions of either the Eastern Conference or Western Conference which were not the Supporters' Shield champions; team qualified regardless of whether they were from the United States or Canada, and should they also win the MLS Cup, the MLS Cup runners-up would qualify).
- The champions of the 2019 U.S. Open Cup (for 2021 CONCACAF Champions League only, replacing the champions of the 2020 U.S. Open Cup because the tournament was not held that year).

If there were any teams which qualified through multiple berths, or if there was any Canada-based MLS team which were champions of the MLS Cup, the Supporters' Shield, or conference regular season (not applicable for 2021 CONCACAF Champions League), the vacated berth was reallocated to the U.S.-based team with the best MLS regular season record not yet qualified.

For Canada, the champions of the Canadian Championship, its domestic cup competition which awarded the Voyageurs Cup, were originally set to qualify for the CONCACAF Champions League. However, the final between Forge FC, champions of the Canadian Premier League, and Toronto FC could not be scheduled in time for the start of the tournament, and so it was then agreed upon that Toronto FC would be Canada's representative. While some Canada-based teams competed in MLS, they could not qualify through either the MLS regular season or playoffs. Moreover, the champions of the Canadian Premier League qualified for the CONCACAF League, meaning a second team from Canada (and a tenth team from North America) could qualify for the CONCACAF Champions League.

=== Central America ===
Teams from the Central American Football Union (UNCAF), which consisted of seven member associations, had to qualify for the CONCACAF Champions League through the CONCACAF League. A total of 18 teams from Central America qualified for the CONCACAF League through their domestic leagues. As all but four teams in the CONCACAF League were from Central America, between two and six teams from Central America could qualify for the CONCACAF Champions League.

=== Caribbean ===
Teams from the Caribbean Football Union (CFU), which consisted of 31 member associations, qualified for the CONCACAF Champions League either as champions of the CONCACAF Caribbean Club Championship, the first-tier subcontinental Caribbean club tournament, or through the CONCACAF League. Since 2018, the CONCACAF Caribbean Club Championship had been open to teams from professional leagues, where they could qualify as champions or runners-up of their respective association's league in the previous season.

Another three teams from the Caribbean qualified for the CONCACAF League, which were the runners-up and third-placed team of the CONCACAF Caribbean Club Championship, and the winners of a playoff between the fourth-placed team of the CONCACAF Caribbean Club Championship and the champions of the CONCACAF Caribbean Club Shield, the second-tier subcontinental Caribbean club tournament which was open to teams from non-professional leagues, where they could qualify as champions of their respective association's league in the previous season. Therefore, between one and four teams from the Caribbean could qualify for the CONCACAF Champions League.

=== CONCACAF League ===
Besides the ten direct entrants of the CONCACAF Champions League, another 22 teams (1 from North America, 18 from Central America, and 3 from the Caribbean) qualified for the CONCACAF League, a tournament held from July to November prior to the CONCACAF Champions League. The top six teams of the CONCACAF League (champions, runners-up, both losing semi-finalists and two play-in round winners) qualified for the CONCACAF Champions League.

== Teams ==
The following 16 teams (from eight associations) qualified for the tournament.

- North American Zone: 9 teams (from three associations)
- Central American Zone: 5 teams (from three associations), all of them qualified through the 2020 CONCACAF League
- Caribbean Zone: 2 teams (from two associations), one of them qualified through the 2020 CONCACAF League

In the following table, the number of appearances, last appearance, and previous best result count only those in the CONCACAF Champions League era starting from 2008–09 (not counting those in the era of the Champions' Cup from 1962 to 2008).

Direct entrants (10 teams)
Association	Team	Qualifying method	App. (last)	Previous best (last)
Mexico (4 berths)	Monterrey	2019 Apertura champions	6th (2019)	Champions (2019)
Mexico (4 berths)	Cruz Azul	2020 Clausura regular season first place at time of suspension	7th (2020)	Champions (2013–14)
Mexico (4 berths)	América	2019 Apertura runners-up	6th (2020)	Champions (2015–16)
Mexico (4 berths)	León	2020 Clausura regular season second place at time of suspension	3rd (2020)	Round of 16 (2020)
United States (4 berths)	Columbus Crew SC	2020 MLS Cup champions	3rd (2010–11)	Quarter-finals (2010–11)
United States (4 berths)	Philadelphia Union	2020 MLS Supporters' Shield champions	1st	Debut
United States (4 berths)	Portland Timbers	MLS is Back Tournament champions	3rd (2016–17)	Group stage (2016–17)
United States (4 berths)	Atlanta United FC	2019 U.S. Open Cup champions	3rd (2020)	Quarter-finals (2020)
Canada (1 berth)	Toronto FC	2020 Canadian Championship finalists	7th (2019)	Runners-up (2018)
Dominican Republic (CFU berth)	Atlético Pantoja	Best ranked team of 2020 CONCACAF Caribbean Club Championship group stage	2nd (2019)	Round of 16 (2019)

Qualified teams from CONCACAF League (6 teams)
Association	Team	Qualifying method	App. (last)	Previous best (last)
Costa Rica	Alajuelense	2020 CONCACAF League champions (1st overall)	6th (2014–15)	Semi-finals (2014–15)
Costa Rica	Saprissa	2020 CONCACAF League runners-up (2nd overall)	10th (2020)	Semi-finals (2010–11)
Honduras	Olimpia	2020 CONCACAF League better ranked losing semi-finalists (3rd overall)	12th (2020)	Semi-finals (2020)
Honduras	Marathón	2020 CONCACAF League worse ranked play-in round winners (6th overall)	6th (2019)	Quarter-finals (2009–10)
Haiti	Arcahaie	2020 CONCACAF League worse ranked losing semi-finalists (4th overall)	1st	Debut
Nicaragua	Real Estelí	2020 CONCACAF League better ranked play-in round winners (5th overall)	7th (2016–17)	Group stage (2016–17)

Notes

1. Canada (CAN): The 2020 Canadian Championship final between Forge FC, the 2020 Canadian Premier League champions, and Toronto FC, the team with the best record in the first phase matches of the revised MLS schedule between the three Canadian teams during the 2020 Major League Soccer season, was originally postponed to the first quarter of 2021 due to the COVID-19 pandemic in Canada, with the winners qualifying for the 2021 CONCACAF Champions League. However, due to the ongoing Covid-19 pandemic and restrictions, the match needed to be further postponed until after the Champions League began. Thus, Canada's berth was awarded to Toronto FC, with Forge FC gaining the right to host the final at a later date.
2. Caribbean (CFU): The final stage of the 2020 CONCACAF Caribbean Club Championship was cancelled by CONCACAF due to the COVID-19 pandemic the Caribbean. The team which qualified to represent the Caribbean Football Union in the 2021 CONCACAF Champions League are Atlético Pantoja from the Dominican Republic, the best ranked team of 2020 CONCACAF Caribbean Club Championship group stage.
3. Mexico (MEX): The 2020 Clausura tournament of the 2019–20 Liga MX season was abandoned due to the COVID-19 pandemic in Mexico, and the title was not awarded. The two teams which qualified from the 2020 Clausura to represent the Mexican Football Federation in the 2021 CONCACAF Champions League are Cruz Azul (MEX2) and León (MEX4), the 2020 Clausura regular season best two teams at the time of suspension.
4. United States 3 (USA3): The 2020 Major League Soccer season was suspended due to the COVID-19 pandemic in the United States and Canada. The season resumed with the MLS is Back Tournament in July and August 2020, where the champions would qualify for the 2021 CONCACAF Champions League regardless of whether they were from the United States or Canada, through the United States' third berth, which was originally awarded only to a team from the United States, replacing the 2020 MLS Eastern or Western Conference regular season champions which were not the Supporters' Shield champions (USA3). This one-time change was approved by CONCACAF, the United States Soccer Federation and the Canadian Soccer Association, and had no bearing on Canada's berth in the 2021 CONCACAF Champions League, which was planned to be awarded to the 2020 Canadian Championship champions; thus, if a team from Canada had won the MLS is Back Tournament, only three teams (instead of the usual four) from the United States, and two teams (instead of the usual one) from Canada (not considering the team from Canada which could qualify through the 2020 CONCACAF League), would have qualified for the 2021 CONCACAF Champions League. If the same team had won both the MLS is Back Tournament and the MLS Cup, the MLS Cup runners-up would qualify for this berth, and if the same team had won both the MLS is Back Tournament and the Canadian Championship, the Canadian Soccer Association would have decided which second team from Canada would qualify for the vacated berth.
5. United States 4 (USA4): The 2020 U.S. Open Cup was cancelled due to the COVID-19 pandemic in the United States. The United States Soccer Federation announced that Atlanta United FC would receive the berth reserved for the cup winners (USA4) for winning the previous year's tournament.

== Draw ==
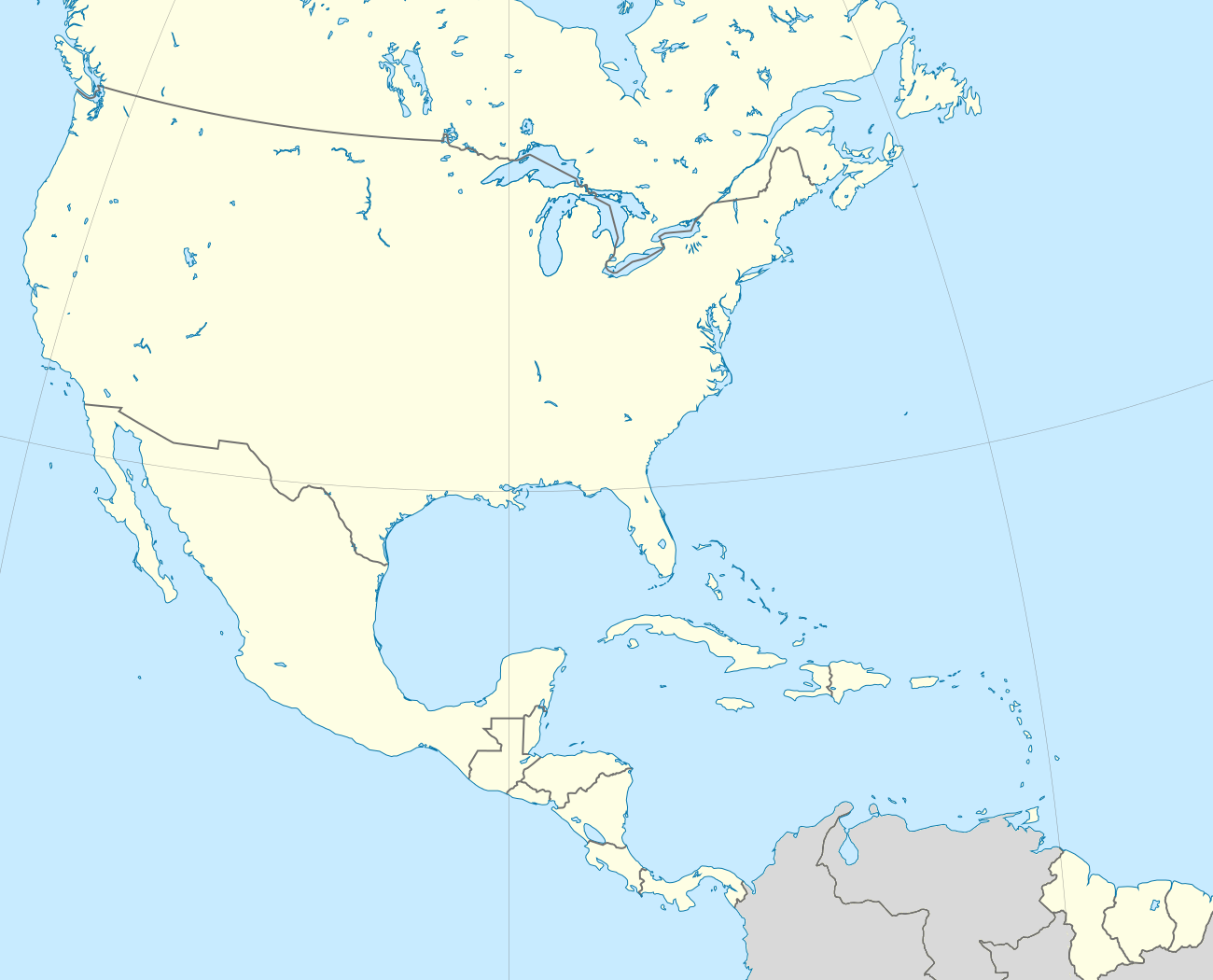
Location of teams of the 2021 CONCACAF Champions League
North American Zone Central American Zone Caribbean Zone

The draw for the 2021 CONCACAF Champions League was held on 10 February 2021, 19:00 EST (UTC−5), at the CONCACAF headquarters in Miami, Florida, United States.

The draw determined each tie in the round of 16 (numbered 1 through 8) between a team from Pot 1 and a team from Pot 2, each containing eight teams. The "Bracket Position Pots" (Pot A and Pot B) contained the bracket positions numbered 1 through 8 corresponding to each tie. The teams from Pot 1 were assigned a bracket position from Pot A and the teams from Pot 2 were assigned a bracket position from Pot B. Teams from the same association could not be drawn against each other in the round of 16 except for "wildcard" teams which replaced a team from another association.

The seeding of teams were based on the CONCACAF Club Index. The CONCACAF Club Index, instead of ranking each team, was based on the on-field performance of the teams that had occupied the respective qualifying slots in the previous five editions of the CONCACAF Champions League. To determine the total points awarded to a slot in any single edition of the CONCACAF Champions League, CONCACAF used the following formula:

Points per	Participation	Win	Draw	Stage advanced	Champions
Points per	4	3	1	1	2

The slots were assigned by the following rules:

- For teams from North America, nine teams qualified based on criteria set by their association (e.g., tournament champions, runners-up, cup champions), resulting in an assigned slot (e.g., MEX1, MEX2) for each team. If a team from Canada qualified through the CONCACAF League, they would be ranked within their association, resulting in an assigned slot (i.e., CAN2) for them.
- For teams from Central America, they qualified through the CONCACAF League, and were ranked per association by their CONCACAF League ranking, resulting in an assigned slot (e.g., CRC1, CRC2) for each team.
- For teams from the Caribbean, the CONCACAF Caribbean Club Championship champions were assigned the Caribbean champion slot (i.e., CCC1). If teams from the Caribbean qualified through the CONCACAF League, they would be ranked per association by their CONCACAF League ranking, resulting in an assigned slot (e.g., JAM1, SUR1) for each team.

The 16 teams were distributed in the pots as follows:

Pot	Rank	Slot	2015–16	2016–17	2018	2019	2020	Total	Team
Pot 1	1	MEX2	20	30	25	21	24	120	(Mexican Football Federation) Cruz Azul
Pot 1	2	MEX1	33	27	12	20	11	103	(Mexican Football Federation) Monterrey
Pot 1	3	MEX3	23	15	17	26	11	92	(Mexican Football Federation) América
Pot 1	4	USA3	16	20	17	11	11	75	(United States Soccer Federation) Portland Timbers
Pot 1	5	CAN1	8	22	21	5	10	66	(Canadian Soccer Association) Toronto FC
Pot 1	6	USA2	13	14	7	15	16	65	(United States Soccer Federation) Philadelphia Union
Pot 1	7	USA1	14	11	11	11	6	53	(United States Soccer Federation) Columbus Crew SC
Pot 1	8	USA4	16	8	5	11	12	52	(United States Soccer Federation) Atlanta United FC
Pot 2	9	MEX4	18	10	9	4	7	48	(Mexican Football Federation) León
Pot 2	10	CRC2	9	14	5	7	4	39	(Costa Rican Football Federation) Saprissa
Pot 2	11	HON2	11	11	5	0	11	38	(National Autonomous Federation of Football of Honduras) Marathón
Pot 2	12	CRC1	10	8	5	7	6	36	(Costa Rican Football Federation) Alajuelense
Pot 2	13	HON1	10	11	5	4	5	35	(National Autonomous Federation of Football of Honduras) Olimpia
Pot 2	14	CCC1	8	5	4	4	4	25	(Dominican Football Federation) Atlético Pantoja
Pot 2	15	NCA1	4	6	0	0	0	10	(Nicaraguan Football Federation) Real Estelí
Pot 2	16	HAI1	0	4	0	0	0	4	(Haitian Football Federation) Arcahaie

Notes

1. ^{CAN} The identity of the qualified team from Canada was not known at the time of the draw.

== Format ==
In the CONCACAF Champions League, the 16 teams played a single-elimination tournament. Each tie was played on a home-and-away two-legged basis, except the final which is played as a single-leg match.

- In the round of 16, quarter-finals and semi-finals, the away goals rule was applied if the aggregate score is tied after the second leg. If still tied, a penalty shoot-out was used to determine the winner (Regulations Article 12.7).
- In the final, extra time was played if the score was tied after the end of match. If the score is still tied after extra time, a penalty shoot-out was used to determine the winner (Regulations Article 12.8).

== Schedule ==
The schedule of the competition was as follows.

Round	First leg	Second leg
Round of 16	6–8 April 2021	13–15 April 2021
Quarter-finals	27–28 April 2021	4–5 May 2021
Semi-finals	11–12 August 2021	15–16 September 2021 (originally 24–26 August 2021)
Final	28 October 2021	

Times are Eastern Daylight Time, i.e., UTC−4, as listed by CONCACAF (local times are in parentheses).

== Bracket ==
Round of 16
(Nicaraguan Football Federation) Real Estelí	0	0	0
(United States Soccer Federation) Columbus Crew SC	4	1	5
(Dominican Football Federation) Atlético Pantoja	0	1	1
(Mexican Football Federation) Monterrey	3	3	6
(Mexican Football Federation) León	1	1	2
(Canadian Soccer Association) Toronto FC	1	2	3
(Haitian Football Federation) Arcahaie	0	0	0
(Mexican Football Federation) Cruz Azul	0	8	8
(National Autonomous Federation of Football of Honduras) Marathón	2	0	2
(United States Soccer Federation) Portland Timbers	2	5	7
(National Autonomous Federation of Football of Honduras) Olimpia	1	1	2
(Mexican Football Federation) América (a)	2	0	2
(Costa Rican Football Federation) Alajuelense	0	0	0
(United States Soccer Federation) Atlanta United FC	1	1	2
(Costa Rican Football Federation) Saprissa	0	0	0
(United States Soccer Federation) Philadelphia Union	1	4	5

Quarter-finals
(United States Soccer Federation) Columbus Crew SC	2	0	2
(Mexican Football Federation) Monterrey	2	3	5
(Canadian Soccer Association) Toronto FC	1	0	1
(Mexican Football Federation) Cruz Azul	3	1	4
(United States Soccer Federation) Portland Timbers	1	1	2
(Mexican Football Federation) América	1	3	4
(United States Soccer Federation) Atlanta United FC	0	1	1
(United States Soccer Federation) Philadelphia Union	3	1	4

Semi-finals
(Mexican Football Federation) Monterrey	1	4	5
(Mexican Football Federation) Cruz Azul	0	1	1
(Mexican Football Federation) América	2	2	4
(United States Soccer Federation) Philadelphia Union	0	0	0

Final
28 October – Guadalupe
(Mexican Football Federation) Monterrey	1
(Mexican Football Federation) América	0

== Round of 16 ==
In the round of 16, the matchups were decided by draw: R16-1 through R16-8. The teams from Pot 1 in the draw hosted the second leg.

=== Summary ===
The first legs were played on 6–8 April, and the second legs were played on 13–15 April 2021.

Team 1	Agg.	Team 2	1st leg	2nd leg
Arcahaie (Haiti)	0–8	(Mexico) Cruz Azul	0–0	0–8
León (Mexico)	2–3	(Canada) Toronto FC	1–1	1–2
Atlético Pantoja (Dominican Republic)	1–6	(Mexico) Monterrey	0–3	1–3
Real Estelí (Nicaragua)	0–5	(United States) Columbus Crew SC	0–4	0–1
Saprissa (Costa Rica)	0–5	(United States) Philadelphia Union	0–1	0–4
Alajuelense (Costa Rica)	0–2	(United States) Atlanta United FC	0–1	0–1
Olimpia (Honduras)	2–2 (a)	(Mexico) América	1–2	1–0
Marathón (Honduras)	2–7	(United States) Portland Timbers	2–2	0–5

=== Matches ===
6 April 2021
22:00 (22:00 UTC−4)

Arcahaie (Haitian Football Federation)	0–0	(Mexican Football Federation) Cruz Azul
	Report

Estadio Olimpico Felix Sanchez, Santo Domingo (Dominican Republic) (Note: Arcahaie played their round of 16 home match at Estadio Olímpico Félix Sánchez, Santo Domingo (Dominican Republic) instead of their regular stadium Stade Sylvio Cator, Port-au-Prince, due to insufficient stadium requirements.)
Attendance: 0
Referee: Kimbell Ward (Saint Kitts and Nevis)
13 April 2021
22:00 (21:00 UTC−5)

Cruz Azul (Mexican Football Federation)	8–0	(Haitian Football Federation) Arcahaie
Gutiérrez 3'; Yotún 11'; Hernández 25'; Montoya 49', 64'; Reyes 61'; Escobar 69'; Angulo 76'	Report

Estadio Azteca, Mexico City
Referee: José Torres (Puerto Rico)

Cruz Azul won 8–0 on aggregate.

7 April 2021
20:00 (19:00 UTC−5)

León (Mexican Football Federation)	1–1	(Canadian Soccer Association) Toronto FC
Navarro 25'	Report	Mosquera 51' (o.g.)

Estadio León, León
Attendance: 9,389
Referee: Ricardo Montero (Costa Rica)
14 April 2021
18:00 (18:00 UTC−4)

Toronto FC (Canadian Soccer Association)	2–1	(Mexican Football Federation) León
Mullins 55'; Morrow 72'	Report	Navarro 80'

ESPN Wide World of Sports Complex, Bay Lake (United States) (Note: Toronto FC played their round of 16 home match at ESPN Wide World of Sports Complex, Bay Lake (United States) instead of their regular home stadium BMO Field, Toronto, due to COVID-19 travel restrictions between Canada and Mexico.)
Attendance: 0
Referee: John Pitti (Panama)

Toronto FC won 3–2 on aggregate.

8 April 2021
22:00 (22:00 UTC−4)

Atlético Pantoja (Dominican Football Federation)	0–3	(Mexican Football Federation) Monterrey
	Report	Janssen 32'; A. González 42'; Alvarado 70'

Estadio Olimpico Felix Sanchez, Santo Domingo
Attendance: 0
Referee: Oshane Nation (Jamaica)
15 April 2021
22:00 (21:00 UTC−5)

Monterrey (Mexican Football Federation)	3–1	(Dominican Football Federation) Atlético Pantoja
L. Sánchez 9'; Janssen 14'; Gallardo 79'	Report	Cabrera 61'

Estadio BBVA, Guadalupe
Referee: Drew Fischer (Canada)

Monterrey won 6–1 on aggregate.

8 April 2021
20:00 (18:00 UTC−6)

Real Estelí (Nicaraguan Football Federation)	0–4	(United States Soccer Federation) Columbus Crew SC
	Report	Zardes 19', 33'; Mensah 26'; Pedro Santos 45+1' (pen.)

Estadio Nacional, Managua
Referee: Selvin Brown (Honduras)
15 April 2021
20:00 (20:00 UTC−4)

Columbus Crew SC (United States Soccer Federation)	1–0	(Nicaraguan Football Federation) Real Estelí
Wright-Phillips 86'	Report

Historic Crew Stadium, Columbus
Referee: Keylor Herrera (Costa Rica)

Columbus Crew SC won 5–0 on aggregate.

7 April 2021
18:00 (16:00 UTC−6)

Saprissa (Costa Rican Football Federation)	0–1	(United States Soccer Federation) Philadelphia Union
	Report	Przybyłko 34'

Estadio Ricardo Saprissa Aymá, San Juan de Tibás
Attendance: 0
Referee: Ismael Cornejo (El Salvador)
14 April 2021
20:00 (20:00 UTC−4)

Philadelphia Union (United States Soccer Federation)	4–0	(Costa Rican Football Federation) Saprissa
Monteiro 47' (pen.), 90'; Przybyłko 51'; Fontana 55'	Report

Subaru Park, Chester
Referee: Fernando Guerrero (Mexico)

Philadelphia Union won 5–0 on aggregate.

6 April 2021
20:00 (18:00 UTC−6)

Alajuelense (Costa Rican Football Federation)	0–1	(United States Soccer Federation) Atlanta United FC
	Report	Barco 50' (pen.)

Estadio Alejandro Morera Soto, Alajuela
Attendance: 0
Referee: Saíd Martínez (Honduras)
13 April 2021
18:00 (18:00 UTC−4)

Atlanta United FC (United States Soccer Federation)	1–0	(Costa Rican Football Federation) Alajuelense
Damm 90+1'	Report

Fifth Third Bank Stadium, Kennesaw (Note: Atlanta United FC played their round of 16 home match at Fifth Third Bank Stadium, Kennesaw instead of their regular home stadium Mercedes-Benz Stadium, Atlanta.)
Attendance: 2,000
Referee: Adonai Escobedo (Mexico)

Atlanta United FC won 2–0 on aggregate.

7 April 2021
22:00 (20:00 UTC−6)

Olimpia (National Autonomous Federation of Football of Honduras)	1–2	(Mexican Football Federation) América
Arboleda 89'	Report	Viñas 41'; Díaz 44'

Estadio Tiburcio Carías Andino, Tegucigalpa
Attendance: 0
Referee: Ismail Elfath (United States)
14 April 2021
20:00 (19:00 UTC−5)

América (Mexican Football Federation)	0–1	(National Autonomous Federation of Football of Honduras) Olimpia
	Report	Bengtson 50'

Estadio Azteca, Mexico City
Referee: Henry Bejarano (Costa Rica)

2–2 on aggregate. América won on away goals.

6 April 2021
18:00 (16:00 UTC−6)

Marathón (National Autonomous Federation of Football of Honduras)	2–2	(United States Soccer Federation) Portland Timbers
Castillo 39'; Ramírez 68'	Report	Mora 35'; Torres 59' (o.g.)

Estadio Olímpico Metropolitano, San Pedro Sula
Attendance: 0
Referee: César Ramos (Mexico)
13 April 2021
20:00 (17:00 UTC−7)

Portland Timbers (United States Soccer Federation)	5–0	(National Autonomous Federation of Football of Honduras) Marathón
Y. Chará 19', 36', 79'; Valeri 66'; Loría 89'	Report

Providence Park, Portland
Attendance: 5,000
Referee: Iván Barton (El Salvador)

Portland Timbers won 7–2 on aggregate.

== Quarter-finals ==
In the quarter-finals, the matchups were determined as follows:

- QF1: Winners of R16-1 vs. Winners of R16-2
- QF2: Winners of R16-3 vs. Winners of R16-4
- QF3: Winners of R16-5 vs. Winners of R16-6
- QF4: Winners of R16-7 vs. Winners of R16-8

The winners of round of 16 matchups 1, 3, 5, and 7 hosted the second leg.

=== Summary ===
The first legs were played on 27–28 April, and the second legs were played on 4–5 May 2021.

Team 1	Agg.	Team 2	1st leg	2nd leg
Toronto FC (Canada)	1–4	(Mexico) Cruz Azul	1–3	0–1
Columbus Crew SC (United States)	2–5	(Mexico) Monterrey	2–2	0–3
Atlanta United FC (United States)	1–4	(United States) Philadelphia Union	0–3	1–1
Portland Timbers (United States)	2–4	(Mexico) América	1–1	1–3

=== Matches ===
27 April 2021
22:00 (22:00 UTC−4)

Toronto FC (Canadian Soccer Association)	1–3	(Mexican Football Federation) Cruz Azul
Osorio 20'	Report	Angulo 3', 34'; Aguilar 58'

Raymond James Stadium, Tampa (United States) (Note: Toronto FC played their quarter-final home match at Raymond James Stadium, Tampa (United States) instead of their regular home stadium BMO Field, Toronto, due to COVID-19 travel restrictions between Canada and Mexico.)
Attendance: 0
Referee: Ricardo Montero (Costa Rica)
4 May 2021
22:15 (21:15 UTC−5)

Cruz Azul (Mexican Football Federation)	1–0	(Canadian Soccer Association) Toronto FC
Angulo 28'	Report

Estadio Azteca, Mexico City
Attendance: 0
Referee: Saíd Martínez (Honduras)

Cruz Azul won 4–1 on aggregate.

28 April 2021
20:30 (20:30 UTC−4)

Columbus Crew SC (United States Soccer Federation)	2–2	(Mexican Football Federation) Monterrey
Valenzuela 66'; Zelarayán 87'	Report	Loba 9'; Alvarado 90+3'

Historic Crew Stadium, Columbus
Attendance: 5,000
Referee: Juan Gabriel Calderón (Costa Rica)
5 May 2021
20:00 (19:00 UTC−5)

Monterrey (Mexican Football Federation)	3–0	(United States Soccer Federation) Columbus Crew SC
Meza 3', 26'; Layún 71'	Report

Estadio BBVA, Guadalupe
Referee: Daneon Parchment (Jamaica)

Monterrey won 5–2 on aggregate.

27 April 2021
20:00 (20:00 UTC−4)

Atlanta United FC (United States Soccer Federation)	0–3	(United States Soccer Federation) Philadelphia Union
	Report	Przybyłko 57', 73'; Fontana 86'

Mercedes-Benz Stadium, Atlanta
Attendance: 17,533
Referee: Jair Marrufo (United States)
4 May 2021
20:00 (20:00 UTC−4)

Philadelphia Union (United States Soccer Federation)	1–1	(United States Soccer Federation) Atlanta United FC
Przybyłko 88'	Report	Sosa 45+2'

Subaru Park, Chester
Referee: Armando Villarreal (United States)

Philadelphia Union won 4–1 on aggregate.

28 April 2021
22:30 (19:30 UTC−7)

Portland Timbers (United States Soccer Federation)	1–1	(Mexican Football Federation) América
Mora 90+7' (pen.)	Report	Martínez 45+1' (pen.)

Providence Park, Portland
Attendance: 6,300
Referee: Mario Escobar (Guatemala)
5 May 2021
22:15 (21:15 UTC−5)

América (Mexican Football Federation)	3–1	(United States Soccer Federation) Portland Timbers
Viñas 21', 59' (pen.); Suárez 70'	Report	Valeri 64' (pen.)

Estadio Azteca, Mexico City
Referee: Iván Barton (El Salvador)

América won 4–2 on aggregate.

== Semi-finals ==
In the semi-finals, the matchups were determined as follows:

- SF1: Winners of QF1 vs. Winners of QF2
- SF2: Winners of QF3 vs. Winners of QF4

The semi-finalists in each tie which had the better performance in previous rounds hosted the second leg.

Pos	Team	Pld	W	D	L	GF	GA	GD	Pts	Host
1 (SF1)	(Mexican Football Federation) Cruz Azul	4	3	1	0	12	1	+11	10	Second leg
2 (SF1)	(Mexican Football Federation) Monterrey	4	3	1	0	11	3	+8	10	First leg
1 (SF2)	(United States Soccer Federation) Philadelphia Union	4	3	1	0	9	1	+8	10	Second leg
2 (SF2)	(Mexican Football Federation) América	4	2	1	1	6	4	+2	7	First leg

Source: CONCACAF
Rules for classification: 1) Points; 2) Goal difference; 3) Goals scored; 4) Away goals scored; 5) Wins; 6) Away wins; 7) Disciplinary points (1 point for yellow card, 3 points for indirect red card, 4 points for direct red card, 5 points for yellow card and direct red card); 8) Drawing of lots (Regulations Article 12.9.5).

=== Summary ===
The first legs were played on 11–12 August, and the second legs were played on 15–16 September 2021.

Team 1	Agg.	Team 2	1st leg	2nd leg
Monterrey (Mexico)	5–1	(Mexico) Cruz Azul	1–0	4–1
América (Mexico)	4–0	(United States) Philadelphia Union	2–0	2–0

=== Matches ===
11 August 2021
20:00 (19:00 UTC−5)

Monterrey (Mexican Football Federation)	1–0	(Mexican Football Federation) Cruz Azul
Meza 9'	Report

Estadio BBVA, Guadalupe
Referee: Luis Enrique Santander (Mexico)
16 September 2021
22:00 (21:00 UTC−5)

Cruz Azul (Mexican Football Federation)	1–4	(Mexican Football Federation) Monterrey
Pineda 10'	Report	Meza 7'; Vergara 17'; Funes Mori 24', 52'

Estadio Azteca, Mexico City
Referee: César Ramos (Mexico)

Monterrey won 5–1 on aggregate.

12 August 2021
22:00 (21:00 UTC−5)

América (Mexican Football Federation)	2–0	(United States Soccer Federation) Philadelphia Union
R. Sánchez 17'; Aguilera 80' (pen.)	Report

Estadio Azteca, Mexico City
Referee: Walter López (Guatemala)
15 September 2021
21:00 (21:00 UTC−4)

Philadelphia Union (United States Soccer Federation)	0–2	(Mexican Football Federation) América
	Report	Benedetti 79'; Martín 90+3'

Subaru Park, Chester
Referee: Saíd Martínez (Honduras)

América won 4–0 on aggregate.

== Final ==
In the final (Winners of SF1 vs. Winners of SF2), the finalist which had the better performances in previous rounds hosted the single-leg match.

Pos	Team	Pld	W	D	L	GF	GA	GD	Pts	Final
1	(Mexico) Monterrey	6	5	1	0	16	4	+12	16	Host
2	(Mexico) América	6	4	1	1	10	4	+6	13	

Source: CONCACAF
Rules for classification: 1) Points; 2) Goal difference; 3) Goals scored; 4) Away goals scored; 5) Wins; 6) Away wins; 7) Disciplinary points; 8) Drawing of lots.

=== Match ===
The match was played on 28 October 2021.

28 October 2021
22:00 (21:00 UTC−5)

Monterrey (Mexico)	1–0	(Mexico) América
Funes Mori 9'	Report

Estadio BBVA, Guadalupe
Attendance: 40,170
Referee: Fernando Hernández (Mexico)

== Statistics ==
=== Top goalscorers ===
Team eliminated for this round.

Rank	Player	Club	By round							Total goals
Rank	Player	Club	1R1	1R2	QF1	QF2	SF1	SF2	F	Total goals
1	(Poland) Kacper Przybyłko	(United States Soccer Federation) Philadelphia Union	1	1	2	1				5
2	(Ecuador) Bryan Angulo	(Mexican Football Federation) Cruz Azul		1	2	1				4
2	(Argentina) Maximiliano Meza	(Mexican Football Federation) Monterrey				2	1	1		4
4	(Colombia) Yimmi Chará	(United States Soccer Federation) Portland Timbers		3						3
4	(Mexico) Rogelio Funes Mori	(Mexican Football Federation) Monterrey						2	1	3
4	(Uruguay) Federico Viñas	(Mexican Football Federation) América	1			2				3
7	(Mexico) José Alvarado	(Mexican Football Federation) Monterrey	1		1					2
7	(United States) Anthony Fontana	(United States Soccer Federation) Philadelphia Union		1	1					2
7	(Netherlands) Vincent Janssen	(Mexican Football Federation) Monterrey	1	1						2
7	(Cape Verde) Jamiro Monteiro	(United States Soccer Federation) Philadelphia Union		2						2
7	(Argentina) Walter Montoya	(Mexican Football Federation) Cruz Azul		2						2
7	(Chile) Felipe Mora	(United States Soccer Federation) Portland Timbers	1		1					2
7	(Mexico) Fernando Navarro	(Mexican Football Federation) León	1	1						2
7	(Argentina) Diego Valeri	(United States Soccer Federation) Portland Timbers		1		1				2
7	(United States) Gyasi Zardes	(United States Soccer Federation) Columbus Crew SC	2							2

=== Awards ===
Award	Player	Club
Golden Ball	(Mexico) Rogelio Funes Mori	(Mexican Football Federation) Monterrey
Golden Boot	(Poland) Kacper Przybyłko	(United States Soccer Federation) Philadelphia Union
Golden Glove	(Mexico) Guillermo Ochoa	(Mexican Football Federation) América
Best Young Player	(Uruguay) Federico Viñas	(Mexican Football Federation) América
Fair Play Award	—	(Mexico) Monterrey

Team of the Tournament
Position	Player	Club
GK	(Mexico) Guillermo Ochoa	(Mexican Football Federation) América
DF	(Mexico) Jesús Gallardo	(Mexican Football Federation) Monterrey
DF	(Chile) Sebastián Vegas	(Mexican Football Federation) Monterrey
DF	(Paraguay) Richard Sánchez	(Mexican Football Federation) América
MF	(Cape Verde) Jamiro Monteiro	(United States Soccer Federation) Philadelphia Union
MF	(Spain) Álvaro Fidalgo	(Mexican Football Federation) América
MF	(Argentina) Maximiliano Meza	(Mexican Football Federation) Monterrey
MF	(Uruguay) Federico Viñas	(Mexican Football Federation) América
FW	(Argentina) Walter Montoya	(Mexican Football Federation) Cruz Azul
FW	(Mexico) Rogelio Funes Mori	(Mexican Football Federation) Monterrey
FW	(Poland) Kacper Przybyłko	(United States Soccer Federation) Philadelphia Union

== See also ==
- 2020 CONCACAF League
