= Danny Rose (footballer, born 1990) =

English footballer (born 1990)

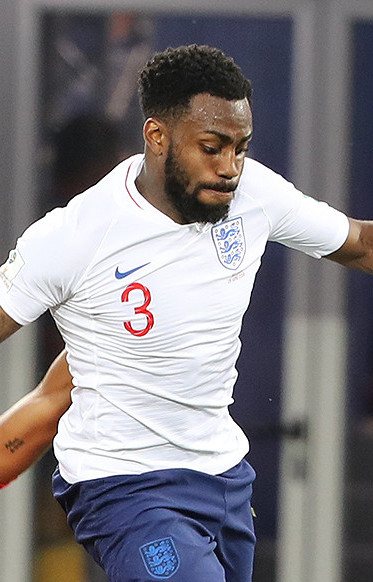
- Rose playing for England at the 2018 FIFA World Cup

Personal information
- Full name: Daniel Lee Rose
- Date of birth: 2 July 1990 (age 36)
- Place of birth: Doncaster, England
- Height: 5 ft 8 in (1.73 m)
- Position: Left-back

Youth career
- –2006: Leeds United

Senior career*
Years	Team	Apps	(Gls)
2006–2007	Leeds United	0	(0)
2007–2021	Tottenham Hotspur	156	(8)
2009	→ Watford (loan)	7	(0)
2009	→ Peterborough United (loan)	6	(0)
2010–2011	→ Bristol City (loan)	17	(0)
2012–2013	→ Sunderland (loan)	27	(1)
2020	→ Newcastle United (loan)	11	(0)
2021–2022	Watford	8	(0)
Total		232	(9)

International career
2005–2006	England U16	5	(0)
2006–2007	England U17	13	(0)
2007–2008	England U18	2	(0)
2008–2009	England U19	6	(1)
2009–2013	England U21	29	(3)
2012	Great Britain Olympic	4	(0)
2016–2019	England	29	(0)
Medal record
Men's football
Representing England
UEFA Nations League
Third place	2019 Portugal
- * Club domestic league appearances and goals

Daniel Lee Rose (born 2 July 1990) is an English former professional footballer who played as a left-back. He was known for his tendency to play attacking football, with particular focus placed on his speed, decision-making, and defensive abilities, all of which often had him likened to Tottenham Hotspur legend Cyril Knowles.

Rose started his professional career at Leeds United in 2006, having progressed through the club's youth ranks, but left for Tottenham Hotspur in July 2007 before making an appearance. Following various loans to Watford, Peterborough United, Bristol City, and Sunderland, he established himself as a first-team player at Tottenham over the next six seasons, as well as starting in the 2019 UEFA Champions League final. Following a brief loan to Newcastle United in 2020, he departed Tottenham in June 2021, and subsequently returned to Watford for a season.

Rose played for England at the under-17 and under-19 levels before making his under-21 debut in 2009. In March 2016, he earned his first senior England cap in a 3–2 victory against Germany. He was then included in the squad for the 2018 FIFA World Cup.

== Early and personal life ==
Rose was born in Doncaster, South Yorkshire. His younger brother Mitch Rose plays for Buxton. He also is the cousin of footballer Michael Rankine, whose uncle Mark Rankine also played professional football.

In June 2018, Rose stated that he had been diagnosed with depression.

On 23 December 2020, Rose was arrested on suspicion of dangerous driving after his car reportedly collided with the central reservation on the A45 in Northampton.

== Club career ==
=== Leeds United ===
Rose is a product of the Leeds United youth academy. Rose was named on the bench for the Leeds first team against Barnet in the League Cup on 20 September 2006. The manager who named Rose on the bench, Kevin Blackwell, was dismissed immediately after the match. Rose was not involved again in a squad for Leeds that season. Leeds were subsequently relegated from The Championship to League One, and with the club entering administration, Rose was sold to raise some much needed money for the club.

=== Tottenham Hotspur ===
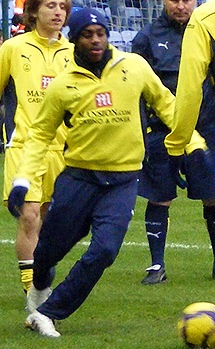
Rose warming up for Tottenham Hotspur in 2010

On 25 July 2007, Tottenham Hotspur signed Rose for a transfer fee in the region of £1 million. A regular for both the Academy and Reserves, Rose was named as an unused substitute for the league fixture against Sunderland in January 2008. His progress was temporarily curtailed, however, by a serious knee injury in September of the same year. Rose made his first start for Spurs in 2–2 FA Cup draw against his former club Leeds United in January 2010.

Rose made his league debut against Arsenal, scoring the first goal of the match after ten minutes as Tottenham won 2–1 in the Premier League on 14 April 2010. The goal was subsequently described as "a volley so thunderous that you could hear the whack off his boot above the din of the raucous crowd" in The Times. Rose won Goal of the Season, with votes run by Sky Sports and by the Tottenham website. On 7 May 2011, Rose started against Blackpool to fill in for regular left-back Benoît Assou-Ekotto, although playing out of his usual position, he was specifically praised by manager Harry Redknapp for his performance in the 1–1 draw. Redknapp later explained that he convinced Rose at that time to convert from a left winger to a left-back by arguing that it would be Rose's only way to play for the England national team. Rose would continue to fill in at left-back for the remaining three matches of the season, turning in excellent performances in a narrow loss to Manchester City and wins over Liverpool and Birmingham City.

==== 2009–2012: Various loan spells ====
In March 2009, Rose went on loan to Watford for the remainder of the 2008–09 season. Watford manager Brendan Rodgers described Rose as a "highly talented, committed player" who possesses "good energy and real intelligence with the ball." He made his debut in Watford's 2–1 away victory at Doncaster Rovers on 4 April 2009.

On 29 September 2009, Rose joined Peterborough United on loan until January 2010. He then went into that night's team where they played Plymouth Argyle, losing 2–1 at home. Rose returned to Tottenham on 11 November 2009, following the departure of Peterborough manager Darren Ferguson.

On 9 September 2010, Rose joined Championship club Bristol City on a season-long loan deal subject to a recall clause which becomes active after 28 days at the club. On 13 November, Rose came on as a second-half substitute against Leeds United and was booed by the home supporters. The match was the first time he had played at Elland Road after leaving the club. Rose returned to Tottenham Hotspur in February 2011 after a series of minor injuries had limited his impact and appearances at Bristol City.

On 31 August 2012, Rose joined Premier League club Sunderland on a season-long loan from Spurs. Rose played his debut against Liverpool on 15 September 2012. Rose scored his first goal for Sunderland in an away match at Aston Villa on 29 April 2013. Rose returned to Tottenham after being named the club's young player of the season to undergo surgery on a wrist injury in May 2013.

==== 2013–14 season ====
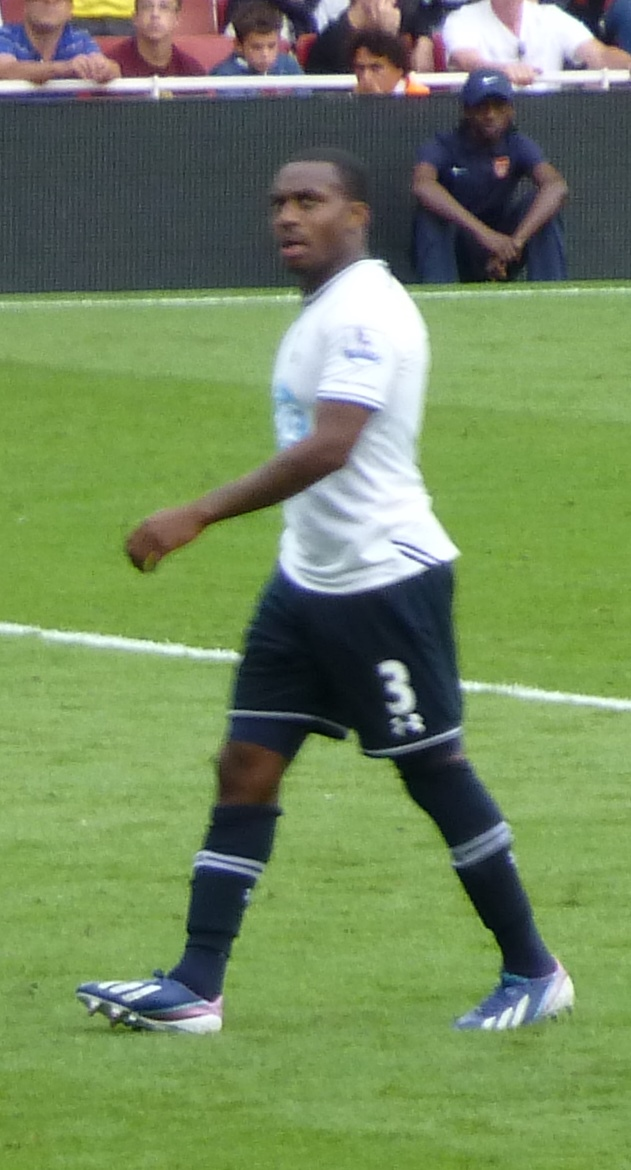
Rose playing for Tottenham Hotspur in 2013

On 22 August 2013 at the beginning of the season, Tottenham went away to Dinamo Tbilisi in Georgia where Rose scored in the play-off first leg which ended in a 5–0 win. Tottenham qualified for the group stage of the Europa League and in September, their first home match against Tromsø Rose suffered an injury. Rose didn't return to training till mid-December.

Rose missed the match where Tottenham suffered a 5–0 home defeat to Liverpool which subsequently saw André Villas-Boas dismissed as manager. On 22 December with Villas-Boas gone, Rose returned to first-team football under Tim Sherwood where Tottenham went away to Southampton and won 3–2.

Towards the end of the season after six away matches without a win Rose scored the only goal of the match with a header in the 33rd minute against Stoke City to earn Tottenham three points. On 31 July 2014, Rose signed a five-year contract with Tottenham. In the 2014 summer transfer window Tottenham signed Ben Davies which would be competition in the left-back role as well as providing cover if Rose got injured.

==== 2014–15 season ====
On 1 January 2015, Rose scored his first goal of the season in Tottenham's 5–3 Premier League victory over Chelsea at White Hart Lane. Rose scored again for Tottenham in the FA Cup third-round replay against Burnley at home, netting the final goal in a 4–2 victory. He added to his tally in the Premier League on 22 February against West Ham United, scoring Spurs' first in a 2–2 draw. He started as Tottenham lost 2–0 to Chelsea in the 2015 League Cup Final at Wembley Stadium on 1 March. On 16 May, Rose scored his final goal of the campaign in a 2–0 home victory over Hull City, which effectively left the Tigers needing a win at home against Manchester United to survive relegation which they failed to do.

==== 2015–2018 ====
Rose was named as captain by manager Mauricio Pochettino for the first time in his career in a 2015–16 FA Cup match against Leicester City on 10 January 2016.

On 28 February 2016, Rose scored the winning goal in a 2–1 home victory over Swansea City as Tottenham closed the gap on league leaders Leicester City. This was also his first goal of the season.

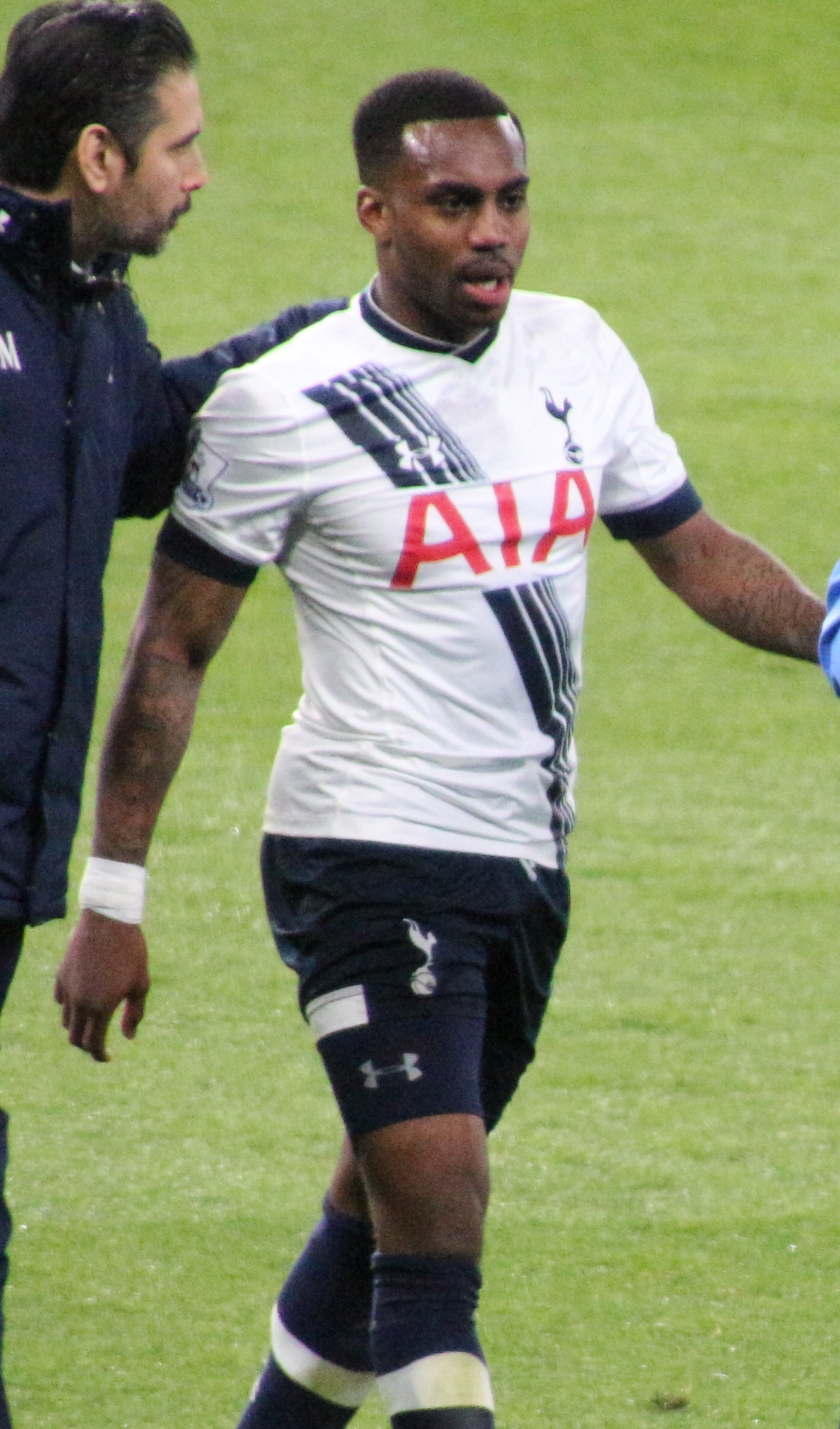
Rose playing for Tottenham Hotspur in 2016

On 22 September 2016, Rose signed a new contract with Tottenham Hotspur until 2021. He scored his first goal of the season on 27 August to earn Tottenham a point in a 1–1 draw against Liverpool. He continued to perform strongly for Spurs, putting many important performances in during the first half of the season and on 18 December, he scored the winning goal in a 2–1 win against Burnley after completing a one-two with summer signing Moussa Sissoko. On 31 January 2017, Spurs went away to Sunderland in the Premier League where during the match Rose suffered knee ligament damage. In March the Evening Standard reported that Rose was expected to return in the beginning of April. Although still out injured, Rose was named as left-back in the PFA Team of the Year on 20 April 2017 for the second consecutive season. In May 2017, Tottenham announced that Rose "has undergone exploratory surgery on his left knee" and will not return until next season.

In October 2017, Rose returned to first team training after being out injured for over nine months. He made his first appearance of the 2017–18 season as a substitute in the UEFA Champions League away game against Real Madrid that ended in a 1–1 draw. He made his first start of the season in a 1–0 home win against Crystal Palace in early November.

==== 2019–2021 ====
In April 2019, he said he was looking forward to ending his football career due to racism in 5 or 6 years. Later that month he said he hoped governing bodies would take more action to eradicate racism in football. In June he started in the Champions League Final against Liverpool, which Tottenham lost.

Rose was not included in the Tottenham squad for the 2019 International Champions Cup. The club stated that "Danny Rose has been granted additional time off in order to explore prospective opportunities with other clubs." However, no move materialised for Rose, and on 10 August 2019 he started in Tottenham's first game of the season, a 3–1 victory against Aston Villa.

On 30 January 2020, Rose moved clubs for the first time in seven years when he joined Newcastle United on loan for the rest of the season. Following his move, Rose criticised Tottenham manager José Mourinho as he felt he was not "given as much of a chance as everybody else in the backline" in the Tottenham squad. The loan was later extended to cover the rest of the season following football's suspension due to the COVID-19 pandemic.

Rose was not allocated a squad number for the season and was omitted from Tottenham's Premier League and Europa League squads, rendering him ineligible for selection by the club in either competition until at least January 2021. On 27 May, Tottenham announced that Rose would leave the club upon the end of the 2020–21 season.

=== Return to Watford ===
On 16 June 2021, Watford announced the free transfer of Rose on a two-year contract. Rose made just nine appearances for the club during the 2021–22 season, the last of which came in December 2021 during a 3–1 loss to Manchester City.

On 12 July 2022, Rose was in the starting lineup for Tottenham Hotspur U21 in a friendly match against Enfield Town. He had previously asked to appear for Tottenham "one last time" and was granted his wish despite being under contract with Watford for another year. He wore his well-known number 3 shirt. The match ended 3–2 to Enfield. It was also reported that he wanted to leave Vicarage Road following Watford's relegation to the EFL Championship. On 1 September 2022, Watford terminated Rose's contract by mutual agreement.

=== Retirement ===
Following his release from Watford, Rose trained with National League York City to regain fitness in early 2023. He also worked as a pundit during this period. Rose formally announced his retirement from professional football in July 2024. Rose had commented earlier in 2019 that he "couldn't wait to retire" because of frustrations with racism in the game.

== International career ==
=== England U21s ===
On 1 June 2009, Rose was called into the England under-21 team for the European Championships taking place later in the month when striker Danny Welbeck was ruled out through injury. He made his debut with a substitute appearance in a 7–0 friendly win over Azerbaijan on 8 June.

Rose scored his first goal for England U-21s on 14 November 2009 in a 2011 European Championship qualifier win against Portugal. His second goal came in a 2–0 victory against Uzbekistan on 10 August 2010. His third goal for the team came on 5 June 2011 in a 2–0 win against Norway, the final warm-up match before the 2011 UEFA European Under-21 Championship.

On 16 October 2012, Rose was shown a red card during a 2013 UEFA European Under-21 Championship qualification play-off match against Serbia, after he kicked a football into the crowd after the match had finished. Rose had been racially abused by members of the crowd throughout the match and after the match whilst celebrating the victory with his England teammates, which sparked a mass brawl between players and coaching staff of both teams.

=== Great Britain Olympic football team ===
On 2 July 2012, Rose was named in Stuart Pearce's final 18-man Great Britain Olympic football squad for the 2012 Summer Olympics.

=== England senior team ===
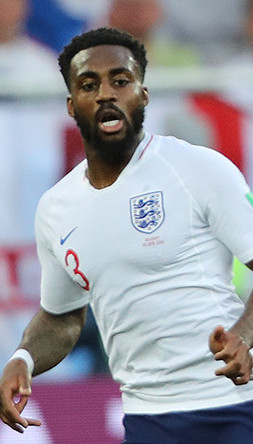
Rose playing for England at the 2018 FIFA World Cup

On 28 August 2014, Rose was named in the senior England squad for the first time, ahead of a friendly against Norway and a Euro 2016 qualifier against Switzerland in September, but did not feature. Rose made his debut as a starter in a 3–2 away win over Germany in a friendly on 26 March 2016.

Rose was previously eligible to play for Jamaica through his Jamaican grandfather, and was contacted by the Jamaica Football Federation (JFF) in early 2015 over the possibility of representing Jamaica at international level.

He was named in the 23-man England national team squad for the 2018 FIFA World Cup. He started their group stage match against Belgium, where he played in midfield. They went on to lose 1-0, when Adnan Januzaj scored.

== Career statistics ==
=== Club ===
Appearances and goals by club, season and competition
Club	Season	League			FA Cup		League Cup		Europe		Total	
Club	Season	Division	Apps	Goals	Apps	Goals	Apps	Goals	Apps	Goals	Apps	Goals
Leeds United	2006–07	Championship	0	0	0	0	0	0	—		0	0
Tottenham Hotspur	2007–08	Premier League	0	0	0	0	0	0	0	0	0	0
Tottenham Hotspur	2008–09	Premier League	0	0	0	0	0	0	0	0	0	0
Tottenham Hotspur	2009–10	Premier League	1	1	3	0	1	0	—		5	1
Tottenham Hotspur	2010–11	Premier League	4	0	0	0	0	0	0	0	4	0
Tottenham Hotspur	2011–12	Premier League	11	0	5	0	0	0	4 (Note: Appearance(s) in UEFA Europa League)	0	20	0
Tottenham Hotspur	2013–14	Premier League	22	1	1	0	1	0	6	1	30	2
Tottenham Hotspur	2014–15	Premier League	28	3	2	1	3	0	1	0	34	4
Tottenham Hotspur	2015–16	Premier League	24	1	2	0	1	0	3	0	30	1
Tottenham Hotspur	2016–17	Premier League	18	2	0	0	0	0	3 (Note: Appearances in UEFA Champions League)	0	21	2
Tottenham Hotspur	2017–18	Premier League	10	0	3	0	1	0	3	0	17	0
Tottenham Hotspur	2018–19	Premier League	26	0	0	0	3	0	8	0	37	0
Tottenham Hotspur	2019–20	Premier League	12	0	0	0	0	0	4	0	16	0
Tottenham Hotspur	2020–21	Premier League	0	0	0	0	0	0	0	0	0	0
Tottenham Hotspur	Total		156	8	16	1	10	0	32	1	214	10
Watford (loan)	2008–09	Championship	7	0	—		—		—		7	0
Peterborough United (loan)	2009–10	Championship	6	0	—		—		—		6	0
Bristol City (loan)	2010–11	Championship	17	0	—		—		—		17	0
Sunderland (loan)	2012–13	Premier League	27	1	1	0	1	0	—		29	1
Newcastle United (loan)	2019–20	Premier League	11	0	2	0	—		—		13	0
Watford	2021–22	Premier League	8	0	0	0	1	0	—		9	0
Career total			232	9	19	1	12	0	32	1	295	11

=== International ===
Appearances and goals by national team and year
National team	Year	Apps	Goals
England	2016	12	0
England	2017	2	0
England	2018	11	0
England	2019	4	0
Total		29	0

== Honours ==
Tottenham Hotspur

- Football League Cup runner-up: 2014–15
- UEFA Champions League runner-up: 2018–19

England U17

- UEFA European Under-17 Championship runner-up: 2007

England U21

- UEFA European Under-21 Championship runner-up: 2009

England

- UEFA Nations League third place: 2018–19

Individual

- Sunderland Young Player of the Season: 2012–13
- PFA Team of the Year: 2015–16 Premier League, 2016–17 Premier League
