= 2016–17 Tottenham Hotspur F.C. season =

English football club season

Tottenham Hotspur
2016–17 season
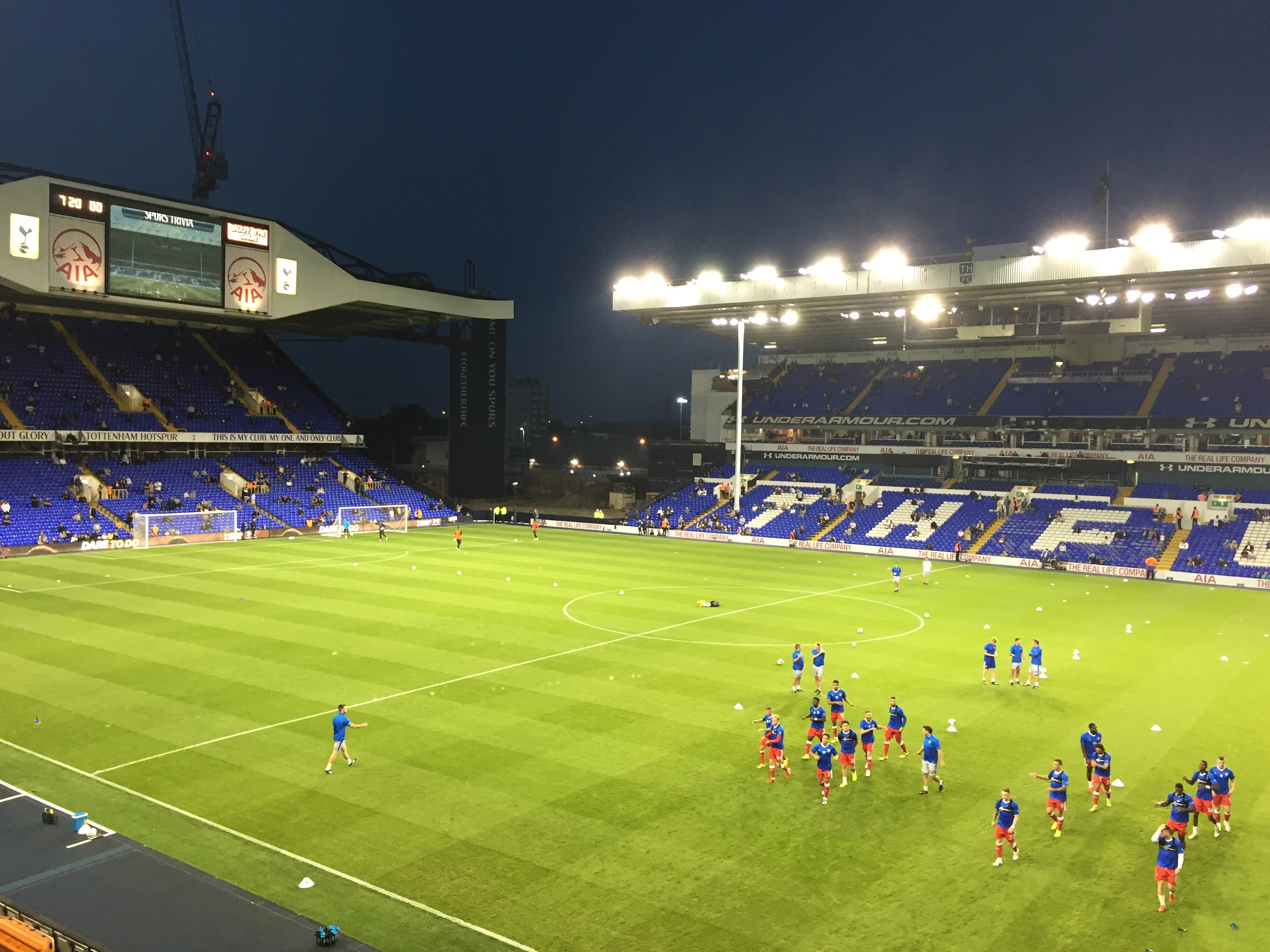
- North east part of the stadium was removed by September 2016.
- Owner: ENIC International Ltd.
- Chairman: Daniel Levy
- Manager: Mauricio Pochettino
- Stadium: White Hart Lane (Domestic competitions); Wembley Stadium (European competitions)
- Premier League: 2nd
- FA Cup: Semi-finals
- League Cup: Fourth round
- UEFA Champions League: Group stage
- UEFA Europa League: Round of 32
- Top goalscorer: League: Harry Kane (29); All: Harry Kane (35)
- Highest home attendance: 85,512 vs Bayer Leverkusen (2 November 2016)
- Lowest home attendance: 24,712 vs Gillingham (21 September 2016)
- Average home league attendance: 31,639
Home colours	Away colours	Third colours

The 2016–17 season was Tottenham Hotspur's 25th season in the Premier League and 39th successive season in the top division of the English football league system. Along with the Premier League, the club competed in the FA Cup, League Cup, the Champions League, and the Europa League. The season covers the period from 1 July 2016 to 30 June 2017.

Tottenham finished as runners-up in the league, seven points behind champions Chelsea. It was their best finish in the Premier League era. The club also had the best attack and defence, scoring 86 and conceding 26 (a goal difference of +60).

The club played their home domestic fixtures at White Hart Lane and their home European fixtures at Wembley Stadium. It was their last season at White Hart Lane before it was demolished to make way for the new stadium. Tottenham went the season unbeaten at their old stadium in all competitions; it was the first time they had done this in a league campaign since the 1964–65 season. In winning their final fourteen home league matches, they equalled the club record set over the final nine games of 1986–87 and the first five of 1987–88.

== First-team squad ==
Squad no.	Name	Nationality	Position(s)	Date of birth (age)
Goalkeepers
1	Hugo Lloris (C)	(France)	GK	26 December 1986 (aged 30)
13	Michel Vorm	(Netherlands)	GK	20 October 1983 (aged 33)
30	Pau López	(Spain)	GK	13 December 1994 (aged 22)
Defenders
2	Kyle Walker	(England)	RB / RWB	28 May 1990 (aged 26)
3	Danny Rose	(England)	LB / LWB	2 July 1990 (aged 26)
4	Toby Alderweireld	(Belgium)	CB / RB	2 March 1989 (aged 28)
5	Jan Vertonghen (2nd VC)	(Belgium)	CB / LB	24 April 1987 (aged 30)
16	Kieran Trippier	(England)	RB / RWB	19 September 1990 (aged 26)
27	Kevin Wimmer	(Austria)	CB / LB	15 November 1992 (aged 24)
33	Ben Davies	(Wales)	LB / CB	24 April 1993 (aged 24)
38	Cameron Carter-Vickers	(United States)	CB / RB	31 December 1997 (aged 19)
Midfielders
11	Erik Lamela	(Argentina)	RW / LW	4 March 1992 (aged 25)
12	Victor Wanyama	(Kenya)	DM / CM	25 June 1991 (aged 25)
14	Georges-Kévin Nkoudou	(France)	LW / RW	13 February 1995 (aged 22)
15	Eric Dier	(England)	DM / CB / RB	15 January 1994 (aged 23)
17	Moussa Sissoko	(France)	CM / DM / RM	16 August 1989 (aged 27)
19	Mousa Dembélé	(Belgium)	CM / DM	16 July 1987 (aged 29)
20	Dele Alli	(England)	CM / AM	11 April 1996 (aged 21)
23	Christian Eriksen	(Denmark)	AM / SS	14 February 1992 (aged 25)
25	Josh Onomah	(England)	AM / SS	27 April 1997 (aged 20)
29	Harry Winks	(England)	CM / DM	2 February 1996 (aged 21)
Strikers
7	Son Heung-min	(South Korea)	FW / LW / RW / SS	8 July 1992 (aged 24)
9	Vincent Janssen	(Netherlands)	FW	15 June 1994 (aged 22)
10	Harry Kane (1st VC)	(England)	FW / SS	28 July 1993 (aged 23)

== Transfers ==
=== Loans in ===
Date from	Position	Nationality	Name	From	Date until	Ref.
31 August 2016	GK	ESP	Pau López	Espanyol	End of season	

=== Loans out ===
Date from	Position	Nationality	Name	To	Date until	Ref.
12 July 2016	MF	SVK	Filip Lesniak	Slovan Liberec	1 January 2017	
3 August 2016	DF	ARG	Federico Fazio	Roma	End of season (Note: Federico Fazio has cost Roma £1,200,000 for the season-long loan.)	
25 August 2016	MF	ALG	Nabil Bentaleb	Schalke 04	End of season (Note: Nabil Bentaleb has cost Schalke 04 £1,000,000 for the season-long loan.) (Note: On 24 February 2017 it was announced that Bentaleb would be transferred permanently to Schalke 04 in the Summer.)	
25 August 2016	FW	ENG	William Miller	Burton Albion	End of season (Note: On 5 January 2017, it was announced that William Miller would stay at Burton Albion until the end of the season.)	
31 August 2016	FW	CMR	Clinton N'Jie	Marseille	End of season	
31 August 2016	GK	ENG	Luke McGee	Peterborough	End of season (Note: On 16 December 2016, it was announced that Luke McGee would stay at Peterborough until the end of the season.)	
31 August 2016	FW	ENG	Nathan Oduwa	Peterborough	1 January 2017	
7 January 2017	FW	ENG	Ryan Loft	Stevenage	End of season	
20 January 2017	FW	ENG	Shayon Harrison	Yeovil Town	End of season	
24 January 2017	DF	ENG	Connor Ogilvie	Stevenage	End of season	
26 January 2017	MF	ENG	Anton Walkes	Atlanta United	End of MLS season (Note: On 1 August 2017, it was announced that Anton Walkes would stay at Atlanta United until the end of the MLS season.)	
27 January 2017	MF	ENG	Luke Amos	Southend United	End of season	

=== Transfers in ===
Date from	Position	Nationality	Name	From	Fee	Ref.
23 June 2016	MF	KEN	Victor Wanyama	Southampton	£11,000,000	
12 July 2016	FW	NED	Vincent Janssen	AZ	£17,000,000	
30 August 2016	MF	COL	Juan Pablo Gonzalez Velasco	Brentford	Free	
31 August 2016	MF	FRA	Georges-Kévin Nkoudou	Marseille	£9,400,000	
31 August 2016	MF	FRA	Moussa Sissoko	Newcastle United	£30,000,000	
16 January 2017	MF	FIN	Maximus Tainio	HJK Helsinki	Undisclosed	

=== Transfers out ===
Date from	Position	Nationality	Name	To	Fee	Ref.
26 May 2016	DF	NIR	Christopher Paul	Queens Park Rangers (Note: Following Paul's release he joined Queens Park Rangers.)	Released	
7 June 2016	MF	ENG	Emmanuel Sonupe	Northampton Town (Note: Following Sonupe's release he joined Northampton Town.)	Released	
7 June 2016	MF	ENG	Armani Daly	Free agent	Released	
7 June 2016	MF	ENG	Charlie Hayford	Sheffield Wednesday (Note: Following Hayford's release he joined Sheffield Wednesday.)	Released	
1 August 2016	MF	ENG	Grant Ward	Ipswich Town	Undisclosed	
4 August 2016	MF	ENG	Alex Pritchard	Norwich City	£8,000,000	
12 August 2016	MF	ENG	Dominic Ball	Rotherham United	Undisclosed	
24 August 2016	DF	USA	DeAndre Yedlin	Newcastle United	£5,000,000	
29 August 2016	MF	BEL	Nacer Chadli	West Bromwich Albion	£13,000,000	
30 August 2016	MF	ENG	Ryan Mason	Hull City	£13,000,000	
17 January 2017	MF	ENG	Tom Carroll	Swansea City	£4,500,000	
14 February 2017	MF	ENG	Nathan Oduwa	Olimpija Ljubljana	Undisclosed	
14 February 2017	MF	ALG	Nabil Bentaleb	FC Schalke 04 (Note: Bentaleb deal came into effect on 14 February 2017 but will be complete at the end of the season after his loan spell contract has ended.)	£16,000,000	

=== Overall transfer activity ===
==== Spending ====
Summer: ▼£67,400,000

Winter: £0

Total: ▼£67,400,000

==== Income ====
Summer: ▲£39,000,000

Winter: ▲£20,500,000

Total: ▲£59,500,000

==== Expenditure ====
Summer: ▼£28,400,000

Winter: ▲£20,500,000

Total: ▼£7,900,000

== Friendlies ==
=== Pre-season ===
On 1 March 2016, it was announced that Tottenham would participate in the Australia edition of the 2016 International Champions Cup. On 24 June, it was announced on the Tottenham Hotspur website that they would also play against Inter Milan in Norway.

Win Draw Loss

26 July 2016 Int. Champions Cup	Juventus	2–1	Tottenham Hotspur	Melbourne, Australia
11:00 BST	Dybala 6'; Benatia 14'	Report	Lamela 67'	Stadium: Melbourne Cricket Ground; Attendance: 31,447; Referee: Ben Williams

29 July 2016 Int. Champions Cup	Tottenham Hotspur	0–1	Atlético Madrid	Melbourne, Australia
11:00 BST		Report	Godín 40'	Stadium: Melbourne Cricket Ground; Attendance: 42,107; Referee: Chris Beath

5 August 2016 Friendly	Tottenham Hotspur	6–1	Inter Milan	Oslo, Norway
16:00 BST	Kane 5' (pen.), 57'; Mason (yellow card) 16'; Alli (yellow card) 27', (goal) 52'; Lamela 40', (yellow card) 79'; Janssen 65'; Harrison 77'	Report	Perišić 23'; Felipe Melo (yellow card) 62'	Stadium: Ullevaal Stadion; Referee: Svein-Erik Edvartsen

=== Post-season ===
On 8 May 2017, Spurs confirmed a return to Hong Kong to play an exhibition match against Kitchee SC, which closed Spurs' season.

26 May 2017 Friendly	Kitchee	1–4	Tottenham Hotspur	Hong Kong
13:00 BST; 20:00 HKT	Lucas 88'	Report	Son 16'; Janssen 20'; Kane 83'; Sterling 90+1'	Stadium: Hong Kong Stadium; Attendance: 27,568; Referee: Liu Kwok Man

== Competitions ==
=== Overall ===
Competition	Started round	Final position	First match	Last match
Premier League	Matchday 1	2nd	13 August 2016	21 May 2017
EFL Cup	Third round	Fourth round	21 September 2016	25 October 2016
FA Cup	Third round	Semi-finals	8 January 2017	22 April 2017
Champions League	Group stage		14 September 2016	7 December 2016
Europa League	Round of 32		16 February 2017	23 February 2017

=== Overview ===
Competition	Record							
Competition	Pld	W	D	L	GF	GA	GD	Win %
Premier League	38	26	8	4	86	26	+60	68.42
FA Cup	5	4	0	1	17	7	+10	80.00
EFL Cup	2	1	0	1	6	2	+4	50.00
Champions League	6	2	1	3	6	6	+0	33.33
Europa League	2	0	1	1	2	3	−1	0.00
Total	53	33	10	10	117	44	+73	62.26

Source: Competitions

=== Premier League ===
==== League table ====
Pos	Team	Pld	W	D	L	GF	GA	GD	Pts	Qualification or relegation
1	Chelsea (C)	38	30	3	5	85	33	+52	93	Qualification for the Champions League group stage
2	Tottenham Hotspur	38	26	8	4	86	26	+60	86	Qualification for the Champions League group stage
3	Manchester City	38	23	9	6	80	39	+41	78	Qualification for the Champions League group stage
4	Liverpool	38	22	10	6	78	42	+36	76	Qualification for the Champions League play-off round
5	Arsenal	38	23	6	9	77	44	+33	75	Qualification for the Europa League group stage (Note: Arsenal qualified for the Europa League group stage by winning the 2016–17 FA Cup. As they had also qualified there by the virtue of their league position (5th), this spot was passed to the next-highest ranked team (6th), Manchester United.)

Source: Premier League
Rules for classification: 1) Points; 2) Goal difference; 3) Goals scored; 4) Play-offs (only if needed to decide champion, teams for relegation or teams for UEFA competitions).
(C) Champions

==== Results summary ====
Overall								Home						Away					
Pld	W	D	L	GF	GA	GD	Pts	W	D	L	GF	GA	GD	W	D	L	GF	GA	GD
38	26	8	4	86	26	+60	86	17	2	0	47	9	+38	9	6	4	39	17	+22

Source: Competitive matches

==== Results by matchday ====
Matchday	1	2	3	4	5	6	7	8	9	10	11	12	13	14	15	16	17	18	19	20	21	22	23	24	25	26	27	28	29	30	31	32	33	34	35	36	37	38
Ground	A	H	H	A	H	A	H	A	A	H	A	H	A	H	A	H	H	A	A	H	H	A	A	H	A	H	H	H	A	A	H	H	A	H	A	H	A	A
Result	D	W	D	W	W	W	W	D	D	D	D	W	L	W	L	W	W	W	W	W	W	D	D	W	L	W	W	W	W	W	W	W	W	W	L	W	W	W
Position	5	6	6	4	3	2	2	3	4	4	5	5	5	5	5	5	5	5	4	3	2	2	2	2	3	2	2	2	2	2	2	2	2	2	2	2	2	2
Points	1	4	5	8	11	14	17	18	19	20	21	24	24	27	27	30	33	36	39	42	45	46	47	50	50	53	56	59	62	65	68	71	74	77	77	80	83	86

Source: Statto
A = Away; H = Home; W = Win; D = Draw; L = Loss

==== Matches ====
On 15 June 2016, the fixtures for the forthcoming season were announced.

13 August 2016 1	Everton	1–1	Tottenham Hotspur	Liverpool
15:00 BST	Barkley 5'	PL Report; BBC Report	Lamela 59'	Stadium: Goodison Park; Attendance: 34,494; Referee: Martin Atkinson

20 August 2016 2	Tottenham Hotspur	1–0	Crystal Palace	Tottenham, London
15:00 BST	Walker (yellow card) 60'; Vertonghen (yellow card) 68'; Dier (yellow card) 77'; Wanyama 82'	PL Report; BBC Report	Zaha (yellow card) 26'; Dann (yellow card) 66'; Townsend (yellow card) 88'	Stadium: White Hart Lane; Attendance: 31,447; Referee: Michael Oliver

27 August 2016 3	Tottenham Hotspur	1–1	Liverpool	Tottenham, London
12:30 BST	Rose (yellow card) 29', (goal) 72'; Vertonghen (yellow card) 51'; Alli (yellow card) 77'	PL Report; BBC Report	Mané (yellow card) 32'; Milner 43' (pen.); Coutinho (yellow card) 45+1'; Lovren (yellow card) 63'; Henderson (yellow card) 85'; Matip (yellow card) 90+4'	Stadium: White Hart Lane; Attendance: 31,211; Referee: Bobby Madley

10 September 2016 4	Stoke City	0–4	Tottenham Hotspur	Stoke-on-Trent
15:00 BST	Whelan (yellow card) 7'; Arnautović (yellow card) 34'; Adam (yellow card) 90+1'	PL Report; BBC Report	Son 41', 56'; Wanyama (yellow card) 45+1'; Alli 59'; Kane 70'; Sissoko (yellow card) 90'	Stadium: Bet365 Stadium; Attendance: 27,385; Referee: Anthony Taylor

18 September 2016 5	Tottenham Hotspur	1–0	Sunderland	Tottenham, London
16:30 BST	Kane 59'; Davies (yellow card) 84'	PL Report; BBC Report	Manquillo (yellow card) 44'; Denayer (yellow card) 57'; Cattermole (yellow card) 62'; Ndong (yellow card) 65'; Januzaj (yellow card) 81' (yellow-red card) 90'; Djilobodji (yellow card) 90+1'	Stadium: White Hart Lane; Attendance: 31,251; Referee: Mike Dean

24 September 2016 6	Middlesbrough	1–2	Tottenham Hotspur	Middlesbrough
15:00 BST	Gibson 65'; Traoré (yellow card) 87'; Friend (yellow card) 90+6'	PL Report; BBC Report	Son 7', 23'; Walker (yellow card) 63'	Stadium: Riverside Stadium; Attendance: 32,703; Referee: Graham Scott

2 October 2016 7	Tottenham Hotspur	2–0	Manchester City	Tottenham, London
14:15 BST	Kolarov 9' (o.g.); Wanyama (yellow card) 30'; Alli 37'; Rose (yellow card) 42'	PL Report; BBC Report	Otamendi (yellow card) 20'; Sterling (yellow card) 56'	Stadium: White Hart Lane; Attendance: 31,793; Referee: Andre Marriner

15 October 2016 8	West Bromwich Albion	1–1	Tottenham Hotspur	West Bromwich
15:00 BST	McClean (yellow card) 44'; Chadli 82'; Evans (yellow card) 90+4'	PL Report; BBC Report	Vertonghen (yellow card) 54'; Dembélé (yellow card) 86'; Alli 89'	Stadium: The Hawthorns; Attendance: 24,263; Referee: Kevin Friend

22 October 2016 9	Bournemouth	0–0	Tottenham Hotspur	Bournemouth
12:30 BST	Gosling (yellow card) 39'; Gradel (yellow card) 67'	PL Report; BBC Report	Lamela (yellow card) 18'; Vertonghen (yellow card) 35'; Alli (yellow card) 37'; Rose (yellow card) 43'	Stadium: Dean Court; Attendance: 11,201; Referee: Craig Pawson

29 October 2016 10	Tottenham Hotspur	1–1	Leicester City	Tottenham, London
15:00 BST	Rose (yellow card) 37'; Son (yellow card) 41'; Janssen 44' (pen.); Wanyama (yellow card) 67'	PL Report; BBC Report	Musa 48', (yellow card) 63'; Mahrez (yellow card) 54'; Vardy (yellow card) 65'; Simpson (yellow card) 88'	Stadium: White Hart Lane; Attendance: 31,868; Referee: Robert Madley

6 November 2016 11	Arsenal	1–1	Tottenham Hotspur	Holloway, London
12:00 GMT	Wimmer 42' (o.g.); Koscielny (yellow card) 69'	PL Report; BBC Report	Wimmer (yellow card) 6'; Kane 51' (pen.); Dier (yellow card) 73'	Stadium: Emirates Stadium; Attendance: 60,039; Referee: Mark Clattenburg

19 November 2016 12	Tottenham Hotspur	3–2	West Ham United	Tottenham, London
17:30 GMT	Dembélé (yellow card) 35'; Winks 51'; Walker (yellow card) 53'; Rose (yellow card) 62'; Kane 89', 90+1' (pen.)	PL Report; BBC Report	Antonio 24', (yellow card) 64'; Lanzini (yellow card) 31', (goal) 68' (pen.); Reid (yellow card) 90+3' (yellow-red card) 90+6'	Stadium: White Hart Lane; Attendance: 31,212; Referee: Mike Dean

26 November 2016 13	Chelsea	2–1	Tottenham Hotspur	Fulham, London
17:30 GMT	David Luiz (yellow card) 19'; Pedro 45'; Moses 51'; Willian (yellow card) 85'	PL Report; BBC Report	Eriksen 11'; Dembélé (yellow card) 26'	Stadium: Stamford Bridge; Attendance: 41,513; Referee: Michael Oliver

3 December 2016 14	Tottenham Hotspur	5–0	Swansea City	Tottenham, London
15:00 GMT	Kane 39' (pen.), 49'; Son 45+1'; Eriksen 70', 90+2'	PL Report; BBC Report	Fulton (yellow card) 22'; Fabiański (yellow card) 40'; Amat (yellow card) 61'; Fer (yellow card) 70'	Stadium: White Hart Lane; Attendance: 31,663; Referee: Jonathan Moss

11 December 2016 15	Manchester United	1–0	Tottenham Hotspur	Manchester
14:15 GMT	Mkhitaryan 29', (yellow card) 76'; Valencia (yellow card) 32'; Pogba (yellow card) 64'	PL Report; BBC Report	Wanyama (yellow card) 58'; Walker (yellow card) 78'; Rose (yellow card) 82'	Stadium: Old Trafford; Attendance: 75,271; Referee: Bobby Madley

14 December 2016 16	Tottenham Hotspur	3–0	Hull City	Tottenham, London
20:00 GMT	Eriksen 14', 63'; Wanyama 73'	PL Report; BBC Report	Maguire (yellow card) 18'; Davies (yellow card) 59'	Stadium: White Hart Lane; Attendance: 31,347; Referee: Andre Marriner

18 December 2016 17	Tottenham Hotspur	2–1	Burnley	Tottenham, London
16:00 GMT	Alli 27'; Sissoko (yellow card) 70'; Rose 71'	PL Report; BBC Report	Barnes 21', (yellow card) 28'; Lowton (yellow card) 90+2'	Stadium: White Hart Lane; Attendance: 31,467; Referee: Kevin Friend

28 December 2016 18	Southampton	1–4	Tottenham Hotspur	Southampton
19:45 GMT	Van Dijk 2'; Redmond (red card) 57'	PL Report; BBC Report	Dembélé (yellow card) 15'; Alli 19', 87'; Kane 52'; Walker (yellow card) 55'; Rose (yellow card) 60'; Son 85'; Vertonghen (yellow card) 90'	Stadium: St Mary's Stadium; Attendance: 31,853; Referee: Mike Dean

1 January 2017 19	Watford	1–4	Tottenham Hotspur	Watford
13:30 GMT	Holebas (yellow card) 44'; Prödl (yellow card) 63'; Cathcart (yellow card) 83'; Kaboul 90+1'	PL Report; BBC Report	Kane 27', 33'; Alli 41', 46'	Stadium: Vicarage Road Stadium; Attendance: 20,882; Referee: Michael Oliver

4 January 2017 20	Tottenham Hotspur	2–0	Chelsea	Tottenham, London
20:00 GMT	Wanyama (yellow card) 40'; Alli 45+1', 54', (yellow card) 45+2'; Rose (yellow card) 87'	PL Report; BBC Report	Pedro (yellow card) 18'; Cahill (yellow card) 38'	Stadium: White Hart Lane; Attendance: 31,491; Referee: Martin Atkinson

14 January 2017 21	Tottenham Hotspur	4–0	West Bromwich Albion	Tottenham, London
12:30 GMT	Kane 12', 77', 82'; McAuley 26' (o.g.)	PL Report; BBC Report	Olsson (yellow card) 64'; McAuley (yellow card) 70'	Stadium: White Hart Lane; Attendance: 31,613; Referee: Anthony Taylor

21 January 2017 22	Manchester City	2–2	Tottenham Hotspur	Manchester
17:30 GMT	Kolarov (yellow card) 45+2'; Sané 49'; Otamendi (yellow card) 52'; De Bruyne 54'	PL Report; BBC Report	Wimmer (yellow card) 12'; Dier (yellow card) 13'; Alli (yellow card) 51', (goal) 58'; Son 77'; Wanyama (yellow card) 87'	Stadium: City of Manchester Stadium; Attendance: 54,402; Referee: Andre Marriner

31 January 2017 23	Sunderland	0–0	Tottenham Hotspur	Sunderland, Tyne and Wear
19:45 GMT	Rodwell (yellow card) 33'; Manquillo (yellow card) 65'	PL Report; BBC Report		Stadium: Stadium of Light; Attendance: 40,058; Referee: Lee Mason

4 February 2017 24	Tottenham Hotspur	1–0	Middlesbrough	Tottenham, London
17:30 GMT	Kane 58' (pen.)	PL Report; BBC Report	De Roon (yellow card) 38'	Stadium: White Hart Lane; Attendance: 31,949; Referee: Mark Clattenburg

11 February 2017 25	Liverpool	2–0	Tottenham Hotspur	Liverpool
17:30 GMT	Mané 16', 18'; Henderson (yellow card) 53'; Matip (yellow card) 56'; Milner (yellow card) 68'	PL Report; BBC Report	Son (yellow card) 28'; Kane (yellow card) 67'; Winks (yellow card) 71'; Dier (yellow card) 78'; Alderweireld (yellow card) 83'	Stadium: Anfield; Attendance: 53,159; Referee: Anthony Taylor

26 February 2017 26	Tottenham Hotspur	4–0	Stoke City	Tottenham, London
13:30 GMT	Kane 14', 32', 37'; Alli 45+1'; Wimmer (yellow card) 67'; Wanyama (yellow card) 90'	PL Report; BBC Report	Whelan (yellow card) 20'; Adam (yellow card) 25'; Arnautović (yellow card) 39'	Stadium: White Hart Lane; Attendance: 31,864; Referee: Jonathan Moss

5 March 2017 27	Tottenham Hotspur	3–2	Everton	Tottenham, London
13:30 GMT	Kane 20', 56'; Dembélé (yellow card) 76'; Alli 90+2'	PL Report; BBC Report	Gueye (yellow card) 29'; Lukaku 81'; Valencia 90+3'; Williams (yellow card) 90+5'	Stadium: White Hart Lane; Attendance: 31,962; Referee: Michael Oliver

19 March 2017 28	Tottenham Hotspur	2–1	Southampton	Tottenham, London
14:15 GMT	Dier (yellow card) 11'; Eriksen 14'; Alli 33' (pen.); Walker (yellow card) 39'; Wanyama (yellow card) 61'	PL Report; BBC Report	Redmond (yellow card) 26'; Ward-Prowse 52'; Boufal (yellow card) 81'; Romeu (yellow card) 90+4'	Stadium: White Hart Lane; Attendance: 31,697; Referee: Andre Marriner

1 April 2017 29	Burnley	0–2	Tottenham Hotspur	Burnley
15:00 BST	Keane (yellow card) 47'; Barnes (yellow card) 79'	PL Report; BBC Report	Dier 66'; Son 77'	Stadium: Turf Moor; Attendance: 21,684; Referee: Stuart Attwell

5 April 2017 30	Swansea City	1–3	Tottenham Hotspur	Swansea
19:45 BST	Routledge 11'; Ayew (yellow card) 17'	PL Report; BBC Report	Dier (yellow card) 78'; Alli 88'; Son 90+1'; Eriksen 90+4'	Stadium: Liberty Stadium; Attendance: 20,855; Referee: Jonathan Moss

8 April 2017 31	Tottenham Hotspur	4–0	Watford	Tottenham, London
12:30 BST	Alli 33'; Dier 39'; Son 44', 54'	PL Report; BBC Report	Doucouré (yellow card) 34'	Stadium: White Hart Lane; Attendance: 31,706; Referee: Anthony Taylor

15 April 2017 32	Tottenham Hotspur	4–0	Bournemouth	Tottenham, London
12:30 BST	Dembélé 16'; Son 19'; Kane 48'; Janssen 90+2'	PL Report; BBC Report	Fraser (yellow card) 70'	Stadium: White Hart Lane; Attendance: 31,943; Referee: Michael Oliver

26 April 2017 33	Crystal Palace	0–1	Tottenham Hotspur	Selhurst, London
20:00 BST	Ward (yellow card) 66'; Milivojević (yellow card) 79'; Zaha (yellow card) 90+7'	PL Report; BBC Report	Wanyama (yellow card) 26'; Walker (yellow card) 47'; Kane (yellow card) 60'; Eriksen 78'	Stadium: Selhurst Park; Attendance: 25,596; Referee: Jonathan Moss

30 April 2017 34	Tottenham Hotspur	2–0	Arsenal	Tottenham, London
16:30 BST	Alli 55'; Kane 58' (pen.), (yellow card) 72'	PL Report; BBC Report	Gabriel (yellow card) 70'; Giroud (yellow card) 73'; Monreal (yellow card) 76'	Stadium: White Hart Lane; Attendance: 31,811; Referee: Michael Oliver

5 May 2017 35	West Ham United	1–0	Tottenham Hotspur	Stratford, London
20:00 BST	Noble (yellow card) 15'; Reid (yellow card) 39'; Lanzini 65', (yellow card) 66'; Byram (yellow card) 71'	PL Report; BBC Report	Walker (yellow card) 12'; Trippier (yellow card) 90+4'	Stadium: Olympic Stadium; Attendance: 56,992; Referee: Anthony Taylor

14 May 2017 36	Tottenham Hotspur	2–1	Manchester United	Tottenham, London
16:30 BST	Wanyama 6', (yellow card) 74'; Kane 48'	PL Report; BBC Report	Rooney (yellow card) 36', (goal) 71'; Bailly (yellow card) 90+1'	Stadium: White Hart Lane; Attendance: 31,848; Referee: Jonathan Moss

18 May 2017 37	Leicester City	1–6	Tottenham Hotspur	Leicester
19:45 BST	Chilwell 59'; Albrighton (yellow card) 65'; Gray (yellow card) 75'; Simpson (yellow card) 80'	PL Report; BBC Report	Kane 25', 63', 88', 90+2'; Son 36', 71'; Sissoko (yellow card) 65'	Stadium: King Power Stadium; Attendance: 31,351; Referee: Michael Oliver

21 May 2017 38	Hull City	1–7	Tottenham Hotspur	Kingston upon Hull
15:00 BST	Clucas 66'	PL Report; BBC Report	Kane 11', 13', 72'; Alli 45+2'; Wanyama 69'; Davies 84'; Alderweireld 87'	Stadium: KCOM Stadium; Attendance: 23,804; Referee: Andre Marriner

=== FA Cup ===
8 January 2017 Third round	Tottenham Hotspur	2–0	Aston Villa	Tottenham, London
16:00 GMT	Davies 71'; Son 80'	BBC Report		Stadium: White Hart Lane; Attendance: 31,182; Referee: Mike Dean

29 January 2017 Fourth round	Tottenham Hotspur	4–3	Wycombe Wanderers	Tottenham, London
15:00 GMT	Winks (yellow card) 54'; Son 60', 90+7'; Janssen 64' (pen.), (yellow card) 69'; Alli 89'	BBC Report	Hayes 23', 36' (pen.); Jombati (yellow card) 43'; O'Nien (yellow card) 54'; Gape (yellow card) 78'; Jacobson (yellow card) 83'; Thompson 83'; Stewart (yellow card) 90+2'	Stadium: White Hart Lane; Attendance: 31,440; Referee: Roger East

19 February 2017 Fifth round	Fulham	0–3	Tottenham Hotspur	Fulham, London
14:00 GMT		BBC Report	Kane 16', 51', 73'	Stadium: Craven Cottage; Attendance: 22,557; Referee: Bobby Madley

12 March 2017 Quarter-final	Tottenham Hotspur	6–0	Millwall	Tottenham, London
14:00 GMT	Eriksen 31'; Son 41', 54', 90+2'; Alli 72'; Janssen 79'	BBC Report	Wallace (yellow card) 43'; Craig (yellow card) 57'	Stadium: White Hart Lane; Attendance: 31,137; Referee: Martin Atkinson

22 April 2017 Semi-final	Chelsea	4–2	Tottenham Hotspur	Wembley, London
17:15 BST	Willian 5', 43' (pen.); Alonso (yellow card) 45+3'; Hazard 75'; Matić 80'; Kanté (yellow card) 90+3'	BBC Report	Alderweireld (yellow card) 4'; Kane 18'; Alli 52', (yellow card) 73'	Stadium: Wembley Stadium; Attendance: 86,355; Referee: Martin Atkinson

=== EFL Cup ===
21 September 2016 Third round	Tottenham Hotspur	5–0	Gillingham	Tottenham, London
20:00 BST	Eriksen 31', 48'; Onomah (yellow card) 43', (goal) 65'; Janssen 51' (pen.); Lamela 68'	BBC Report		Stadium: White Hart Lane; Attendance: 26,244; Referee: David Coote

25 October 2016 Fourth round	Liverpool	2–1	Tottenham Hotspur	Liverpool
19:45 BST	Sturridge 9', 64'; Alexander-Arnold (yellow card) 26'; Ings (yellow card) 82'; Grujić (yellow card) 84'	BBC Report	Janssen 76' (pen.); Winks (yellow card) 90+1'; Wimmer (yellow card) 90+2'	Stadium: Anfield; Attendance: 53,051; Referee: Jonathan Moss

=== UEFA Champions League ===
==== Group stage ====
Pos	Team	Pld	W	D	L	GF	GA	GD	Pts	Qualification	MON	LEV	TOT	CSKA
1	(France) Monaco	6	3	2	1	9	7	+2	11	Advance to knockout phase	—	1–1	2–1	3–0
2	(Germany) Bayer Leverkusen	6	2	4	0	8	4	+4	10	Advance to knockout phase	3–0	—	0–0	2–2
3	(England) Tottenham Hotspur	6	2	1	3	6	6	0	7	Transfer to Europa League	1–2	0–1	—	3–1
4	(Russia) CSKA Moscow	6	0	3	3	5	11	−6	3		1–1	1–1	0–1	—

Source: UEFA
Rules for classification: Group stage tiebreakers

14 September 2016 1	Tottenham Hotspur (England)	1–2	(France) Monaco	London, England
19:45 BST	Kane (yellow card) 35'; Alderweireld 45'	UEFA Report	Silva 15'; Lemar 31'; Glik (yellow card) 50'; Fabinho (yellow card) 56'	Stadium: Wembley Stadium; Attendance: 85,011; Referee: Gianluca Rocchi (Italy)

27 September 2016 2	CSKA Moscow (Russia)	0–1	(England) Tottenham Hotspur	Moscow, Russia
19:45 BST	Eremenko (yellow card) 37'	UEFA Report	Wanyama (yellow card) 11'; Son 71'	Stadium: Arena CSKA; Attendance: 26,153; Referee: Antonio Mateu Lahoz (Spain)

18 October 2016 3	Bayer Leverkusen (Germany)	0–0	(England) Tottenham Hotspur	Leverkusen, Germany
19:45 BST	Çalhanoğlu (yellow card) 21'; Bender (yellow card) 40'	UEFA Report	Lamela (yellow card) 25'	Stadium: BayArena; Attendance: 28,887; Referee: Cüneyt Çakır (Turkey)

2 November 2016 4	Tottenham Hotspur (England)	0–1	(Germany) Bayer Leverkusen	London, England
19:45 GMT		UEFA Report	Kampl 65'	Stadium: Wembley Stadium; Attendance: 85,512; Referee: Jonas Eriksson (Sweden)

22 November 2016 5	Monaco (France)	2–1	(England) Tottenham Hotspur	Fontvieille, Monaco
19:45 GMT	Sidibé 48'; Glik (yellow card) 51'; Lemar 53'; Falcao (yellow card) 57'	UEFA Report	Dier (yellow card) 11'; Dembélé (yellow card) 21'; Kane 52' (pen.); Trippier (yellow card) 84'	Stadium: Stade Louis II; Attendance: 13,100; Referee: Björn Kuipers (Netherlands)

7 December 2016 6	Tottenham Hotspur (England)	3–1	(Russia) CSKA Moscow	London, England
19:45 GMT	Alli 38'; Kane 45+1'; Akinfeev 77' (o.g.)	UEFA Report	Shchennikov (yellow card) 31'; Dzagoev 33'; V. Berezutski (yellow card) 63'	Stadium: Wembley Stadium; Attendance: 62,034; Referee: Nicola Rizzoli (Italy)

=== UEFA Europa League ===
==== Knockout phase ====
===== Round of 32 =====
16 February 2017 First leg	Gent (Belgium)	1–0	(England) Tottenham Hotspur	Ghent, Belgium
18:00 GMT	Perbet 59'	UEFA Report	Walker (yellow card) 54'; Alli (yellow card) 73'	Stadium: Ghelamco Arena; Attendance: 19,267; Referee: Benoît Bastien (France)

23 February 2017 Second leg	Tottenham Hotspur (England)	2–2 (2–3 agg.)	(Belgium) Gent	London, England
20:05 GMT	Eriksen 10'; Alli (red card) 40'; Wanyama 61', (yellow card) 88'; Vertonghen (yellow card) 64'; Walker (yellow card) 74'; Dier (yellow card) 85'; Winks (yellow card) 89'	UEFA Report	Kane 20' (o.g.); Dejaegere (yellow card) 23'; Saief (yellow card) 26'; Kalinić (yellow card) 45'; Verstraete (yellow card) 83'; Perbet 84'; Coulibaly (yellow card) 88'	Stadium: Wembley Stadium; Attendance: 80,465; Referee: Jorge Sousa (Portugal)

== Statistics ==
=== Appearances ===
Last updated: 20 May 2018.
Source: Tottenham Hotspur F.C.

No.	Pos.	Name	Premier League		FA Cup		EFL Cup		Champions League		Europa League		Total	
No.	Pos.	Name	Apps	Goals	Apps	Goals	Apps	Goals	Apps	Goals	Apps	Goals	Apps	Goals
Goalkeepers
1	GK	(France) Hugo Lloris	34	0	1	0	0	0	6	0	2	0	43	0
13	GK	(Netherlands) Michel Vorm	4+1	0	4	0	2	0	0	0	0	0	10+1	0
Defenders
2	DF	(England) Kyle Walker	31+2	0	0+1	0	0	0	3	0	2	0	36+3	0
3	DF	(England) Danny Rose	18	2	0	0	0	0	3	0	0	0	21	2
4	DF	(Belgium) Toby Alderweireld	30	1	4	0	0	0	2+1	1	2	0	38+1	2
5	DF	(Belgium) Jan Vertonghen	33	0	3	0	0	0	5	0	1	0	42	0
16	DF	(England) Kieran Trippier	6+6	0	5	0	2	0	3	0	0	0	16+6	0
27	DF	(Austria) Kevin Wimmer	4+1	0	2	0	2	0	1	0	0	0	9+1	0
33	DF	(Wales) Ben Davies	18+5	1	4	1	2	0	3	0	2	0	29+5	2
38	DF	(United States) Cameron Carter-Vickers	0	0	2	0	2	0	0	0	0	0	4	0
Midfielders
11	MF	(Argentina) Erik Lamela	6+3	1	0	0	1+1	1	3	0	0	0	10+4	2
12	MF	(Kenya) Victor Wanyama	35+1	4	3	0	0+1	0	5	0	2	1	45+2	5
14	MF	(France) Georges-Kévin Nkoudou	0+8	0	1+2	0	1+1	0	0+3	0	0+1	0	2+15	0
15	MF	(England) Eric Dier	34+2	2	4	0	1	0	5	0	2	0	46+2	2
17	MF	(France) Moussa Sissoko	8+17	0	2+2	0	0	0	1+3	0	1	0	12+22	0
19	MF	(Belgium) Mousa Dembélé	24+6	1	1+2	0	0	0	2+2	0	2	0	29+10	1
20	MF	(England) Dele Alli	35+2	18	3+2	3	0	0	6	1	2	0	46+4	22
23	MF	(Denmark) Christian Eriksen	36	8	2+1	1	1	2	5+1	0	1+1	1	45+3	12
25	MF	(England) Josh Onomah	0+5	0	1+2	0	2	1	0+2	0	0	0	3+9	1
29	MF	(England) Harry Winks	3+18	1	4	0	2	0	2+2	0	1+1	0	12+21	1
44	MF	(Slovakia) Filip Lesniak	0+1	0	0	0	0	0	0	0	0	0	0+1	0
45	MF	(England) Anton Walkes	0	0	0	0	0+1	0	0	0	0	0	0+1	0
48	MF	(England) Marcus Edwards	0	0	0	0	0+1	0	0	0	0	0	0+1	0
Forwards
7	FW	(South Korea) Son Heung-min	23+11	14	5	6	0+1	0	6	1	0+2	0	34+14	21
9	FW	(Netherlands) Vincent Janssen	7+20	2	1+2	2	2	2	2+3	0	0+1	0	12+26	6
10	FW	(England) Harry Kane	29+1	29	3	4	0	0	3	2	2	0	37+1	35
39	FW	(England) Shayon Harrison	0	0	0	0	0+1	0	0	0	0	0	0+1	0
Players transferred out during the season.
28	DF	(England) Tom Carroll	0+1	0	0	0	2	0	0	0	0	0	2+1	0

=== Goal scorers ===
Includes all competitive matches.

As of match played 18 May 2017

Rank	Pos.	No.	Player	Premier League	FA Cup	League Cup	Champions League	Europa League	Total
1	FW	10	(England) Harry Kane	29	4	0	2	0	35
2	MF	20	(England) Dele Alli	18	3	0	1	0	22
3	MF	7	(South Korea) Son Heung-min	14	6	0	1	0	21
4	MF	23	(Denmark) Christian Eriksen	8	1	2	0	1	12
5	FW	9	(Netherlands) Vincent Janssen	2	2	2	0	0	6
6	MF	12	(Kenya) Victor Wanyama	4	0	0	0	1	5
7	DF	3	(England) Danny Rose	2	0	0	0	0	2
7	MF	11	(Argentina) Erik Lamela	1	0	1	0	0	2
7	MF	15	(England) Eric Dier	2	0	0	0	0	2
7	DF	4	(Belgium) Toby Alderweireld	1	0	0	1	0	2
7	DF	33	(Wales) Ben Davies	1	1	0	0	0	2
12	MF	25	(England) Josh Onomah	0	0	1	0	0	1
12	MF	29	(England) Harry Winks	1	0	0	0	0	1
12	MF	19	(Belgium) Mousa Dembélé	1	0	0	0	0	1
TOTALS				84	17	6	5	2	114

Last updated: 23 May 2021.
Source: premierleague.com, UEFA.com

==== Hat-tricks ====
Player	Against	Competition	Minutes	Score after goals	Result	Date
(England) Harry Kane	(England) West Brom	Premier League	12', 77', 82'	1-0, 3-0, 4-0	4-0 (H)	14 January 2017
(England) Harry Kane	(England) Fulham	FA Cup	16', 51', 73'	0-1, 0-2, 0-3	0-3 (A)	19 February 2017
(England) Harry Kane	(England) Stoke	Premier League	14', 32', 37'	1-0, 2-0, 3-0	4-0 (H)	26 February 2017
(South Korea) Son Heung-min	(England) Millwall	FA Cup	41', 54', 90+2'	2-0, 3-0, 6-0	6-0 (H)	12 March 2017
(England) Harry Kane	(England) Leicester	Premier League	25', 63', 88', 90+2'	0-1, 1-3, 1-5, 1-6	1-6 (A)	18 May 2017
(England) Harry Kane	(England) Hull	Premier League	11', 13', 72'	0-1, 0-2, 1-5	1-7 (A)	21 May 2017

==== Own goals ====
Player	Against	Competition	Minute	Score after own goal	Result	Date
(Austria) Kevin Wimmer	(England) Arsenal	Premier League	42'	1-0	1-1 (A)	6 November 2016
(England) Harry Kane	(Belgium) Gent	Europa League	20'	1-1	2-2 (H)	23 February 2017

=== Clean sheets ===
The list is sorted by squad number when total clean sheets are equal.

Rnk	No.	Player	Premier League	FA Cup	EFL Cup	Champions League	Europa League	Total
1	1	(France) Hugo Lloris	15	0	0	2	0	17
2	13	(Netherlands) Michel Vorm	2	3	1	0	0	6

Last updated: 9 May 2018.
Source: Tottenham Hotspur F.C.
