= Vincent Janssen =

Dutch footballer (born 1994)

- Janssen with the Portland Timbers in 2026

Personal information
- Full name: Vincent Petrus Anna Sebastiaan Janssen
- Date of birth: 15 June 1994 (age 32)
- Place of birth: Heesch, Netherlands
- Height: 1.85 m (6 ft 1 in)
- Position: Striker

Team information
- Current team: Portland Timbers
- Number: 14

Youth career
- 2000–2002: SV TOP
- 2002–2006: TOP
- 2006–2009: NEC
- 2009–2013: Feyenoord

Senior career*
Years	Team	Apps	(Gls)
2013–2015	Almere City	69	(29)
2015–2016	AZ	34	(27)
2016–2019	Tottenham Hotspur	31	(2)
2017–2018	→ Fenerbahçe (loan)	16	(4)
2019–2022	Monterrey	77	(15)
2022–2026	Antwerp	139	(50)
2026–	Portland Timbers	14	(5)

International career
2008–2009	Netherlands U15	4	(2)
2009	Netherlands U16	6	(1)
2011	Netherlands U18	1	(0)
2014	Netherlands U20	2	(2)
2014–2015	Netherlands U21	10	(8)
2016–2022	Netherlands	22	(7)
- * Club domestic league appearances and goals as of 7 November 2026 (UTC)

Vincent Petrus Anna Sebastiaan Janssen (born 15 June 1994) is a Dutch professional footballer who plays as a striker for Major League Soccer club Portland Timbers.

He began his professional career in the Eerste Divisie with Almere City before playing in the Eredivisie with AZ Alkmaar in 2015–16, finishing as the league's top scorer. He then moved to Tottenham Hotspur of the Premier League for a fee of £17 million, spending his second season on loan at Fenerbahçe in the Turkish Süper Lig. He spent three years in Liga MX with Monterrey, winning honours including the CONCACAF Champions League in 2021. He signed for Royal Antwerp in 2022, and won the Belgian Cup in his first season while scoring in the final.

Janssen earned 22 caps for the Netherlands since his debut in 2016, scoring seven goals. He was part of their squad at the 2022 FIFA World Cup. He retired from international football in March 2023.

== Club career ==
=== Early career ===
Janssen started playing at the amateur branch of TOP, after which he became part of the youth academy of the professional branch of the club. Through a merger of the TOP and N.E.C. academies, he became part of the academy of NEC. From NEC, he transferred to Feyenoord youth teams, winning the U19s national title with Feyenoord in 2013.

After being released by Feyenoord, he joined Eerste Divisie team Almere City in 2013. He made his debut for Almere on 3 August 2013 in a 3–2 home defeat against Volendam. After netting ten goals in the 2013–14 season, he reached 19 goals the following season. He scored 32 goals in 74 appearances in all competitions for Almere.

=== AZ ===
After two seasons with Almere, Janssen moved to Eredivisie side AZ in 2015, signing a contract with the club until 2019. He was signed by director Robert Eenhoorn, a Dutch former Major League Baseball player who signed based on data, following the example of his friend and advisor Billy Beane; due to financial constraints, Eenhorn signed Janssen and fellow second division player Alireza Jahanbakhsh for under £1 million and sold them for a combined £33 million.

Janssen scored his first official goal for the club against İstanbul Başakşehir in a UEFA Europa League qualifier on 30 July 2015. His first goal in the Eredivisie was on 4 October 2015, where he scored the first and second goal in a 3–1 home win against Twente. After failing to score in his first eight matches for the club, he went on to score 20 league goals in the second half of the season – the first player to achieve this feat in 52 years – and became the top scorer of the Eredivisie with a total of 27 goals. This also made him the youngest player to score more than 25 goals in an Eredivisie season since Ronaldo in the 1994–95 season. His first hat-trick for AZ was on 24 January 2016, in a 4–2 home win against former club Feyenoord. He also scored four goals in a 5–1 home win against PEC Zwolle on 16 April 2016. He was awarded the 2016 Johan Cruyff Trophy, the Dutch "Talent of the Year" award.

=== Tottenham Hotspur ===
On 12 July 2016, Janssen joined Premier League side Tottenham Hotspur for £17 million (€20 million) on a four-year contract. Manager Mauricio Pochettino had seen Janssen during a Netherlands friendly with the Republic of Ireland, saying Janssen "ticked all the boxes we needed". With his signing, he became the most expensive player sold by AZ Alkmaar in their football history.

Janssen played in three friendlies for Tottenham before the 2016–17 season, providing a goal and an assist in the final game against Inter Milan. Janssen made his Premier League debut on 13 August, coming on as a substitute for Eric Dier against Everton. He made his first start the next week at home to Crystal Palace, playing at forward the full 90 minutes. Following an ankle injury to star Harry Kane on 18 September, Janssen was thrust into a larger role for the club, with Pochettino stating "this is a big opportunity for him to show what he can do". He scored his first goal for the club on 21 September 2016, converting a penalty in a 5–0 victory in the EFL Cup against Gillingham. His first Premier League goal, another penalty, was on 29 October in a 1–1 draw with Leicester City. He scored his first goal from open play for Tottenham on 12 March 2017, scoring the fifth goal in a 6–0 FA Cup Quarter Final win over Millwall. On 4 September 2017, it was confirmed that Janssen had been omitted from Spurs' Champions League squad for the 2017–18 campaign.

On 8 September 2017, Janssen joined Süper Lig club Fenerbahçe for the season. He scored his first goal for the club in a 4–1 win over Alanyaspor, and a second in the Istanbul derby against Beşiktaş that resulted in a 2–1 win. However, he was injured against Bursaspor in early December, and was out of action for a few months.

In summer 2018 Janssen returned to Tottenham but at the beginning of the 2018–19 season he was not issued a number. Spurs reported on their website that Janssen had surgery for a foot injury and would be in recovery with the club's medical staff. In January 2019, Pochettino publicly said that Janssen was not in his plans, despite Kane being injured and Son Heung-min being away at the AFC Asian Cup; he was subject to interest from Major League Soccer and teams from China and Europe, but Tottenham would not sell for under £15 million. After being out for most of the season Janssen made a substitute appearance and a return to first team football for Spurs against Brighton on 23 April 2019.

=== Monterrey ===
On 23 July 2019, Liga MX club Monterrey signed Janssen on a permanent deal for a fee of an estimated £6 million. He made his official debut on 17 August as a substitute for Rogelio Funes Mori in a 2–0 win against Toluca, and a week later he scored his first goal in Mexican football against Santos Laguna.

He scored his first hat-trick for the club on 5 November in a Copa MX group stage match against Chiapas.

He proved to be a vital part of the team as he helped Monterrey win the Apertura 2019 finals against América. Coming on as substitute in the second leg, he managed to score in the eventual penalty shoot-out as Monterrey won their first title since 2010, his first league title.

In the 2021 CONCACAF Champions League, Janssen scored in each leg of a 6–1 aggregate win over Atlético Pantoja of the Dominican Republic in April, as his team went on to win the final against América.

=== Royal Antwerp ===
On 18 June 2022, Janssen joined Belgian side Royal Antwerp on a four-year deal. He made his league debut for the club on 24 July, in a 2–0 win over K.V. Mechelen on the first matchday of the 2022–23 Belgian First Division A season. He was one of several Dutch players bought in by compatriot sporting director Marc Overmars and manager Mark van Bommel and won the Belgian Cup in his first season, scoring the first goal of the 2–0 final win over Mechelen on 30 April 2023.

On 30 August 2023, he helped the club secure a spot in the group stage of the UEFA Champions League for the first time ever, by scoring a goal in the first leg of their 3–1 aggregate victory over AEK Athens in the play-off round.

=== Portland Timbers ===
On 29 July 2026, Janssen signed with the MLS club Portland Timbers on a free transfer. Janssen, whose wife is Mexican-American, had expressed plans to live permanently in the United States after his playing career.

On 5 September 2026, Janssen scored three goals in Portland's 5–4 win against Minnesota United, becoming the first player in Timbers history to record a hat-trick in an MLS match.

== International career ==
Janssen received his first call up to the senior Netherlands team in March 2016 for friendlies against France and England. In his first international start, a 2–1 win against England on 29 March, he scored his first senior international goal and provided his first assist on the other.

In May 2022, Janssen received a call up from coach Louis van Gaal for UEFA Nations League fixtures, ending a nearly five-year hiatus from the national team. In November, he was included in the 2022 FIFA World Cup squad. Janssen announced his international retirement via social media on 12 March 2023, aged 28, citing the schedule for club football. He was criticised for his decision by former internationals Rafael van der Vaart and Ibrahim Afellay.

== Style of play ==
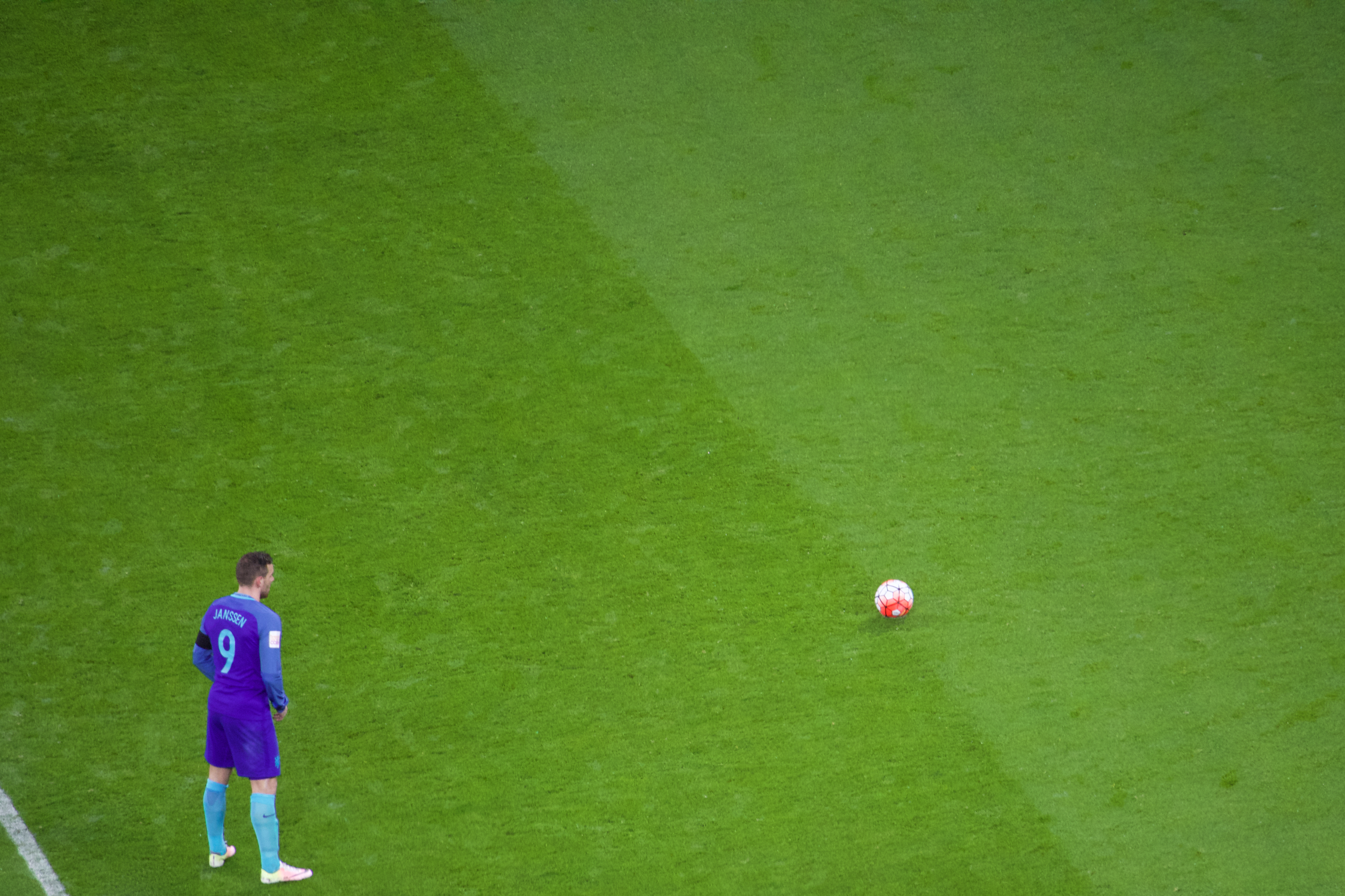
Vincent Janssen lining up to take a penalty against England in March 2016.

A two-footed player, Janssen is credited with good finishing, movement and pace. Due to his strength, he is an "exceptional" hold-up man who can bring teammates into play, and as a good passer of the ball, he can set up goal-scoring opportunities for teammates. He is also praised for his work ethic, as well as his competitive mentality. Janssen's style of play has invited comparisons with Ruud van Nistelrooy.

His weaknesses are shots from outside the penalty box, the timing of his movement and ball control.

== Personal life ==
Janssen is the son of Annemarie Verstappen, a former world champion swimmer and Dutch Sportswoman of the year. He was awarded the 2016 Johan Cruyff Trophy, the Dutch "Talent of the Year" award.

== Career statistics ==
=== Club ===
As of match played 21 November 2026

Appearances and goals by club, season and competition
Club	Season	League			National cup (Note: Includes KNVB Cup, FA Cup, Turkish Cup, Copa MX, Belgian Cup)		League cup (Note: Includes EFL Cup)		Continental		Other		Total	
Club	Season	Division	Apps	Goals	Apps	Goals	Apps	Goals	Apps	Goals	Apps	Goals	Apps	Goals
Almere City	2013–14	Eerste Divisie	35	10	1	0	—		—		—		36	10
Almere City	2014–15	Eerste Divisie	34	19	2	2	—		—		2 (Note: Appearances in Eredivisie relegation play-offs)	1	38	22
Almere City	Total		69	29	3	2	—		—		2	1	74	32
AZ	2015–16	Eredivisie	34	27	5	1	—		10 (Note: Appearances in UEFA Europa League)	3	—		49	31
Tottenham Hotspur	2016–17	Premier League	27	2	3	2	2	2	6 (Note: Five appearances in UEFA Champions League, one appearance in UEFA Europa League)	0	—		38	6
Tottenham Hotspur	2017–18	Premier League	1	0	—		—		—		—		1	0
Tottenham Hotspur	2018–19	Premier League	3	0	—		—		—		—		3	0
Tottenham Hotspur	Total		31	2	3	2	2	2	6	0	—		42	6
Fenerbahçe	2017–18	Süper Lig	16	4	2	1	—		—		—		18	5
Monterrey	2019–20	Liga MX	25	5	9	7	—		—		—		34	12
Monterrey	2020–21	Liga MX	25	7	—		—		5 (Note: Appearances in CONCACAF Champions League)	2	—		30	9
Monterrey	2021–22	Liga MX	27	3	—		—		—		2 (Note: Appearances in FIFA Club World Cup)	0	29	3
Monterrey	Total		77	15	9	7	—		5	2	2	0	93	24
Antwerp	2022–23	Belgian Pro League	36	18	5	3	—		5 (Note: Appearances in UEFA Europa Conference League)	0	—		46	21
Antwerp	2023–24	Belgian Pro League	35	11	5	4	—		8 (Note: Appearances in UEFA Champions League)	2	0	0	48	17
Antwerp	2024–25	Belgian Pro League	33	11	5	2	—		—		1 (Note: Appearance in Belgian Pro League European play-off)	0	39	13
Antwerp	2025–26	Belgian Pro League	35	10	5	3	—		—		—		40	13
Antwerp	Total		139	50	20	12	—		13	2	1	0	173	64
Portland Timbers	2026	Major League Soccer	14	5	—		—		—		3 (Note: Two appearances in Leagues Cup, one appearance in MLS Cup playoffs)	0	17	5
Career total			380	132	42	25	2	2	34	7	8	1	466	167

=== International ===
Appearances and goals by national team and year
National team	Year	Apps	Goals
Netherlands	2016	10	4
Netherlands	2017	7	3
Netherlands	2018	0	0
Netherlands	2019	0	0
Netherlands	2020	0	0
Netherlands	2021	0	0
Netherlands	2022	5	0
Total		22	7

Scores and results list Netherlands' goal tally first, score column indicates score after each Janssen goal.

List of international goals scored by Vincent Janssen
No.	Date	Venue	Cap	Opponent	Score	Result	Competition
1	29 March 2016	Wembley Stadium, London, England	2	England	1–1	2–1	Friendly
2	1 June 2016	Stadion Energa Gdańsk, Gdańsk, Poland	4	Poland	1–0	2–1	Friendly
3	4 June 2016	Ernst-Happel-Stadion, Vienna, Austria	5	Austria	1–0	2–0	Friendly
4	7 October 2016	De Kuip, Rotterdam, Netherlands	8	Belarus	4–1	4–1	2018 FIFA World Cup qualification
5	31 May 2017	Stade Adrar, Agadir, Morocco	11	Morocco	2–0	2–1	Friendly
6	4 June 2017	De Kuip, Rotterdam, Netherlands	12	Ivory Coast	5–0	5–0	Friendly
7	9 June 2017	De Kuip, Rotterdam, Netherlands	13	Luxembourg	5–0	5–0	2018 FIFA World Cup qualification

== Honours ==
Monterrey

- Liga MX: Apertura 2019
- Copa MX: 2019–20
- CONCACAF Champions League: 2021

Antwerp

- Belgian Pro League: 2022–23
- Belgian Cup: 2022–23

Individual

- Eredivisie top scorer: 2015–16
- Johan Cruyff Trophy: 2015–16
- Copa MX Top Scorer: 2019–20
