= Sebastián Vegas =

Chilean footballer (born 1996)

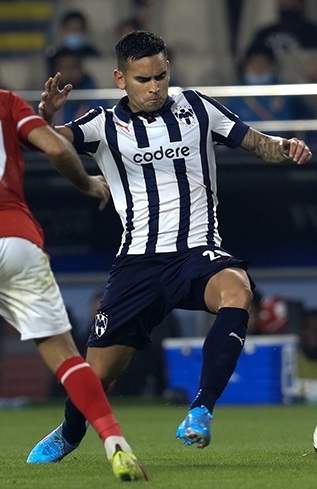
- Vegas with Monterrey at the 2021 FIFA Club World Cup

Personal information
- Full name: Sebastián Ignacio Vegas Orellana
- Date of birth: 4 December 1996 (age 29)
- Place of birth: Santiago, Chile
- Height: 1.84 m (6 ft 1/2 in)
- Position: Defender

Team information
- Current team: León (on loan from Monterrey)
- Number: 5

Youth career
- Audax Italiano

Senior career*
Years	Team	Apps	(Gls)
2013	Audax Italiano B	2	(0)
2013–2017	Audax Italiano	54	(1)
2016–2017	→ Morelia (loan)	15	(0)
2017–2020	Morelia	81	(8)
2020–2021	Mazatlán	0	(0)
2020	→ Monterrey (loan)	32	(2)
2021–	Monterrey	108	(3)
2025	→ Colo-Colo (loan)	22	(2)
2026–	→ León (loan)	21	(0)

International career^{‡}
2013	Chile U17	4	(1)
2014–2015	Chile U20	13	(1)
2015–	Chile	21	(2)
- * Club domestic league appearances and goals as of 9 December 2025 ‡ National team caps and goals as of 22:25, 8 February 2025 (UTC)

Sebastián Ignacio Vegas Orellana (Latin American Spanish: [seβasˈtjam ˈbeɣas]; (Note: In isolation, Sebastián is pronounced [seβasˈtjan].) born 4 December 1996) is a Chilean professional footballer who plays as a defender for Liga MX club León, on loan from Monterrey.

== Club career ==
As a player of Monterrey, Vegas returned to Chile in January 2025 and joined Colo-Colo on a one-year loan. Back to Mexico, he was loaned out to León for the 2026 season.

== International career ==
Vegas represented Chile U20 at friendly tournaments in 2014, and 2015 South American Championship and won the 2015 L'Alcúdia Tournament.

Vegas got his first call up to the senior Chile squad for a friendly against the United States in January 2015.

== Career statistics ==
=== International ===
As of match played on 8 February 2025

Appearances and goals by national team and year
National team	Year	Apps	Goals
Chile	2018	4	1
Chile	2019	5	0
Chile	2020	2	0
Chile	2021	8	1
Chile	2022	1	0
Chile	2025	1	0
Total		21	2

=== International goals ===
As of match played on 26 March 2021. Scores and results list Chile's goal tally first.

No.	Date	Venue	Opponent	Score	Result	Competition
1.	16 November 2018	Estadio El Teniente, Rancagua, Chile	Costa Rica	1–3	2–3	Friendly
2.	11 December 2021	Banc of California Stadium, Los Angeles, United States	El Salvador	1–0	1–0	Friendly

== Honours ==
Monterrey

- Copa MX: 2019–20
- CONCACAF Champions League: 2021

Chile U20

- L'Alcúdia International Tournament: 2015

Chile

- China Cup: 2017

Individual

- CONCACAF Champions League Team of the Tournament: 2021
- IFFHS CONCACAF Team of the Year: 2021
