= Sam McQueen =

English footballer

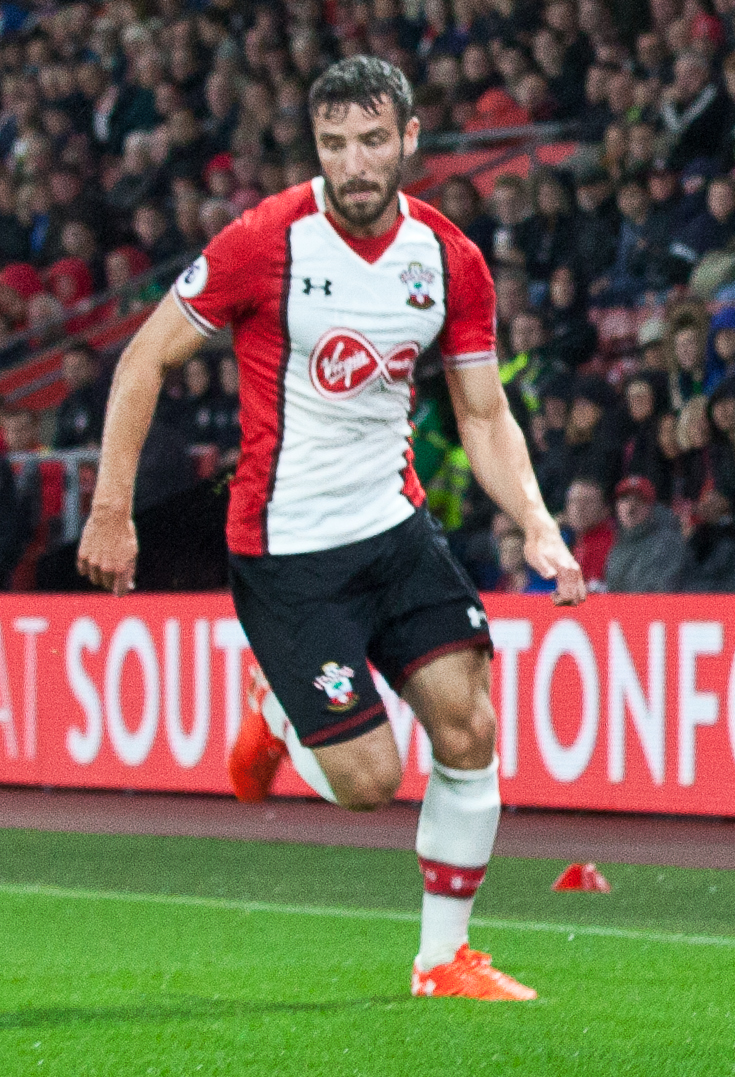
- McQueen playing for Southampton in 2017

Personal information
- Full name: Samuel James McQueen
- Date of birth: 6 February 1995 (age 31)
- Place of birth: Southampton, England
- Height: 5 ft 11 in (1.81 m)
- Positions: Left-back; winger

Youth career
- 2003–2014: Southampton

Senior career*
Years	Team	Apps	(Gls)
2014–2022	Southampton	20	(0)
2016	→ Southend United (loan)	18	(2)
2018	→ Middlesbrough (loan)	5	(0)
Total		43	(2)

International career
2017	England U21	1	(0)
- * Club domestic league appearances and goals

Samuel James McQueen (born 6 February 1995) is an English former professional footballer. Other than loan periods at Southend United in 2016 and Middlesbrough in 2018, he spent his career at hometown club Southampton, having joined the club's academy at the age of eight. He played primarily as a left-sided full-back or winger.

McQueen was forced to retire at the age of 26 in 2022 after failing to recover from a knee injury experienced while on loan at Middlesbrough. McQueen initially ruptured the ACL in his right knee but experienced a series of setbacks culminating in his retirement.

== Early life ==
McQueen was born in Southampton and attended The Mountbatten School in Romsey, Hampshire. Southampton scouted him when he was eight years old whilst playing for Oakwood Rangers, a local youth side. He was part of the Southampton F.C. Academy U13 side that were runners-up in the prestigious Dr Pepper Dallas Cup Tournament in Texas where they lost 1–0 to FC Barcelona California in 2008. The same team included other academy products James Ward-Prowse, Luke Shaw, Calum Chambers, Harrison Reed, Jordan Turnbull, Jake Sinclair and Dominic Gape all who gained professional contracts in later years with the club.

== Club career ==
McQueen was named in the Southampton senior team for the first time on 15 February 2014 for the FA Cup fifth round match against Sunderland at the Stadium of Light; he came on in the second half for his debut, playing the last eight minutes of the 0–1 defeat, in place of Adam Lallana. McQueen signed a new four-year contract on 17 June 2014.

In January 2016, McQueen completed a loan move to League One side Southend United until the end of the season. He made his league debut in the 3–0 home win over Coventry City, coming on as a substitute in the 86th minute. He scored his first league goal as a professional 11 days later in his first full league start in the Essex derby against Colchester United on his 21st birthday.

He made his Premier League debut for Southampton on 16 October 2016, when he replaced Matt Targett at left-back after 14 minutes of a 3–1 win over Burnley, winning a penalty for the third goal. Four days later, he made his 2016–17 UEFA Europa League debut and first senior start for the Saints on 20 October versus Inter Milan at the San Siro. This was followed three days later by his first league start for them in a 1–1 away draw with Manchester City.

On 5 December 2016, McQueen signed a new long-term contract with Southampton, penning a deal until 2021.

On 30 August 2018, McQueen signed for Middlesbrough on a season-long loan. In October 2018, he suffered a serious knee injury in a game against Crystal Palace. McQueen's recovery was disrupted by recurring infections of his knee construction, which required additional surgeries. In April 2021, Southampton manager Ralph Hasenhüttl said it would be a "miracle" if McQueen played again. McQueen retired from professional football as a result of his injuries on 1 January 2022.

== International career ==
McQueen received his first call-up for the England under-21 side as a squad member for a pair of friendly matches against Germany and Denmark in March 2017. McQueen was an unused substitute in the Germany match but was handed his debut on 27 March, starting at left-back in the game against Denmark. Aidy Boothroyd, the manager, was quoted as saying "Sam McQueen was excellent" in the 4–0 victory against Denmark.

== Coaching career ==
Following his retirement from professional football, he returned to Southampton in a coaching role, predominantly working with the under-18s.

== Personal life ==
Exactly 2 weeks after McQueen suffered his ACL injury at Middlesbrough, his brother Benjamin drowned during a Royal Navy training exercise. Following the death of his brother and his injury, McQueen suffered from depression and had six months of counselling.

== Career statistics ==
Appearances and goals by club, season and competition
Club	Season	League			FA Cup		League Cup		Europe		Other		Total	
Club	Season	Division	Apps	Goals	Apps	Goals	Apps	Goals	Apps	Goals	Apps	Goals	Apps	Goals
Southampton	2013–14	Premier League	0	0	1	0	0	0	—		—		1	0
Southampton	2014–15	Premier League	0	0	0	0	0	0	—		—		0	0
Southampton	2015–16	Premier League	0	0	0	0	0	0	0	0	—		0	0
Southampton	2016–17	Premier League	13	0	2	0	2	0	3 (Note: Appearances in UEFA Europa League)	0	—		20	0
Southampton	2017–18	Premier League	7	0	0	0	1	0	—		—		8	0
Southampton	2018–19	Premier League	0	0	0	0	0	0	—		—		0	0
Southampton	2019–20	Premier League	0	0	0	0	0	0	—		—		0	0
Southampton	2020–21	Premier League	0	0	0	0	0	0	—		—		0	0
Southampton	2021–22	Premier League	0	0	0	0	0	0	—		—		0	0
Southampton	Total		20	0	3	0	3	0	3	0	0	0	29	0
Southampton U21s	2016–17 EFL Trophy		—		—		—		—		2 (Note: Appearances in the EFL Trophy)	1	2	1
Southend United (loan)	2015–16	League One	18	2	0	0	0	0	—		0	0	18	2
Middlesbrough (loan)	2018–19	Championship	5	0	0	0	2	0	—		—		7	0
Career total			43	2	3	0	5	0	3	0	2	1	56	3

== Honours ==
Southampton U21

- U21 Premier League Cup: 2014–15

Southampton

- EFL Cup runner-up: 2016–17
