= Scott Sinclair =

English footballer (born 1989)

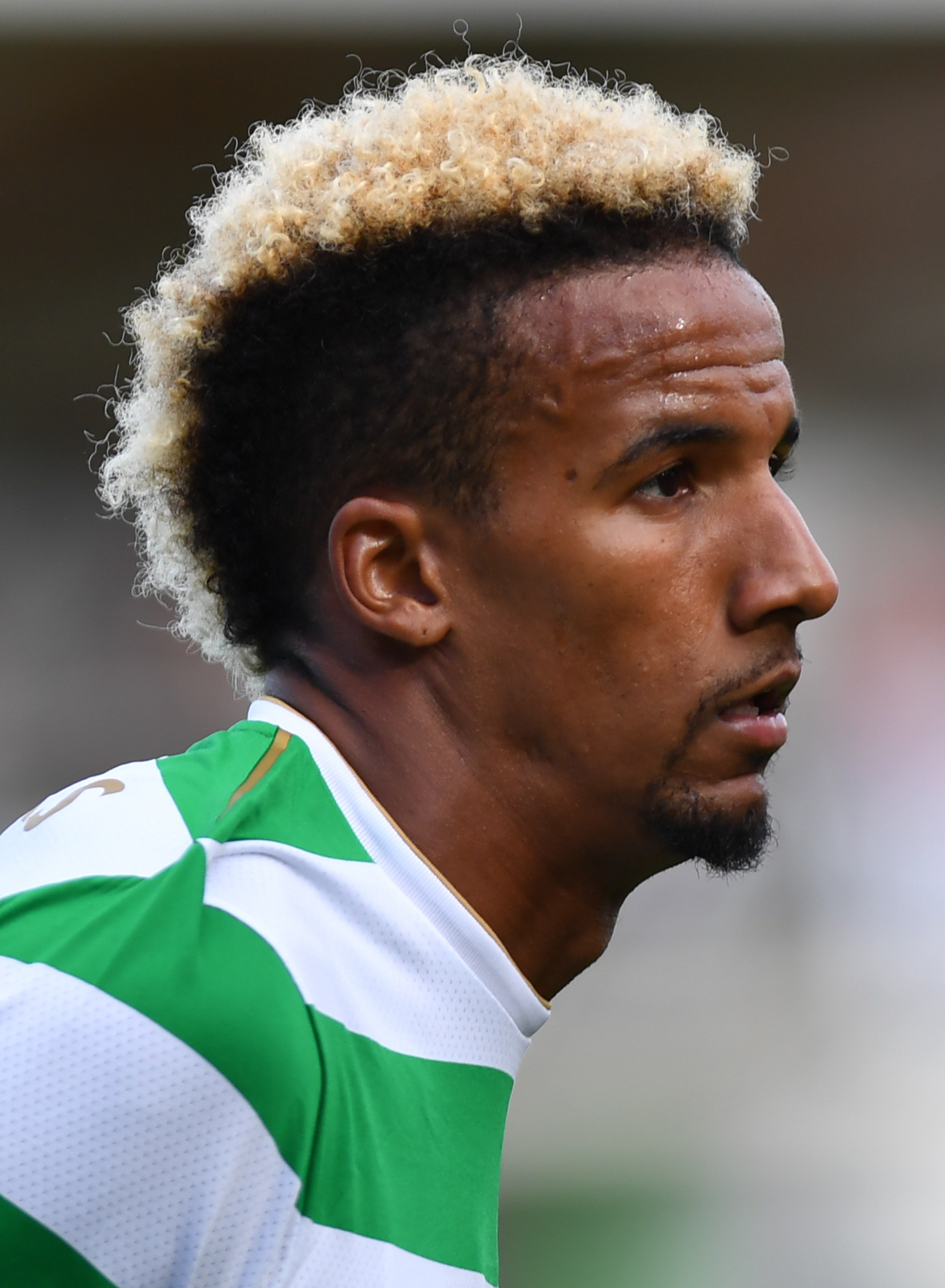
- Sinclair with Celtic in 2017

Personal information
- Full name: Scott Andrew Sinclair
- Date of birth: 25 March 1989 (age 37)
- Place of birth: Bath, England
- Height: 5 ft 9 in (1.75 m)
- Position: Winger

Youth career
- Bath Arsenal
- 1998–2004: Bristol Rovers

Senior career*
Years	Team	Apps	(Gls)
2004–2005	Bristol Rovers	2	(0)
2005–2010	Chelsea	5	(0)
2007	→ Plymouth Argyle (loan)	15	(2)
2007	→ Queens Park Rangers (loan)	9	(1)
2008	→ Charlton Athletic (loan)	3	(0)
2008	→ Crystal Palace (loan)	6	(2)
2009	→ Birmingham City (loan)	14	(0)
2009–2010	→ Wigan Athletic (loan)	18	(1)
2010–2012	Swansea City	82	(28)
2012–2015	Manchester City	13	(0)
2013–2014	→ West Bromwich Albion (loan)	8	(0)
2015	→ Aston Villa (loan)	9	(1)
2015–2016	Aston Villa	27	(2)
2016–2020	Celtic	105	(40)
2020–2022	Preston North End	78	(12)
2022–2025	Bristol Rovers	98	(12)
Total		492	(101)

International career
2005–2006	England U17	5	(3)
2006–2007	England U18	4	(3)
2007–2008	England U19	5	(2)
2009	England U20	1	(0)
2010–2011	England U21	7	(1)
2012	Great Britain Olympic	4	(1)
- * Club domestic league appearances and goals as of 17:10, 4 May 2026 (UTC)

Scott Andrew Sinclair (born 25 March 1989) is an English former professional footballer who plays as a winger. He represented England at youth level, from the under-17s to the under-21s, and also played for Great Britain at the 2012 Summer Olympics.

He started his career with Bristol Rovers, before moving to Chelsea, from where he spent periods on loan at Plymouth Argyle, Queens Park Rangers, Charlton Athletic, Crystal Palace, Birmingham City and Wigan Athletic. In 2010 he signed for Swansea City and in 2012 for Manchester City, who loaned him to West Bromwich Albion and Aston Villa. He joined Villa on a permanent contract in 2015, and moved on to Celtic in August 2016. In his first season with Celtic he won both the PFA Scotland Players' Player of the Year and SFWA Footballer of the Year awards, and he stayed with the club for a further two and a half seasons before returning to England with Preston North End. In October 2022 he signed a short-term deal to return to his boyhood club Bristol Rovers.

== Early life ==
Sinclair was born in Bath, Somerset, where he attended Ralph Allen School. He began his career with Bath Arsenal and grew up supporting Manchester United. Sinclair joined Bristol Rovers at the age of nine. He became the second-youngest (after Ronnie Dix) Bristol Rovers first-team debutant – at the age of 15 years, 277 days – as a late substitute for Junior Agogo in the League Two game against Leyton Orient in December 2004.

== Club career ==
=== Chelsea ===
==== Early career ====
Chelsea signed Sinclair in July 2005. A Football League tribunal set the compensation to be paid to Bristol Rovers at an initial £200,000, with increments up to a potential £750,000 to be paid if and when the player met various appearance milestones at club or international level. Chelsea would also have to pay Rovers 15% of the profit on any future sale.

Sinclair was called up to Chelsea's squad to play Macclesfield Town in the FA Cup on 6 January 2007 but remained on the bench. His debut came four days later as a very late substitute in the 2007 League Cup semi-final against Wycombe Wanderers. He scored his first goal for Chelsea in September 2007, in the 37th minute of the League Cup third-round match against Hull City to help Chelsea win 4–0. He provided the assist for Frank Lampard's 100th goal for Chelsea, in a 3–1 victory over Huddersfield Town in the FA Cup. He made his league debut for Chelsea on 6 May 2007, when he came off the bench to replace Shaun Wright-Phillips for the final ten minutes of the game against Arsenal.

During the January transfer window, Sinclair was signed on a month's loan by Plymouth Argyle, whose manager Ian Holloway had noticed him as a ten-year-old prospect at former club Bristol Rovers. He made his debut as a substitute in the 3–2 victory over Coventry City at Home Park. In his second game, the FA Cup fourth-round tie against Barnet, he scored a fine individual goal to seal a 2–0 victory, taking the ball half the length of the pitch before beating the goalkeeper. Sinclair also scored against Wolverhampton Wanderers at Molineux to put Plymouth 1–0 up in the game, which they drew 2–2. On 17 February 2007, Sinclair scored the second goal, with a looping header from a David Norris cross, as Argyle defeated Derby County 2–0 in their FA Cup fifth-round tie. This result put the club through to the last eight for the first time since 1984. He played in the quarter-final, but Plymouth went down 1–0 to Watford and he was substituted in the second half of the game. On 17 March, Sinclair ran from his own half past two defenders before hitting the ball in off the crossbar to score the only goal of the home match against Crystal Palace.

On 6 May 2007, Sinclair was named in the Chelsea squad to face Arsenal in one of Chelsea's most crucial matches of the season: anything but a win would have handed Manchester United the Premier League title. Sinclair came on as a substitute for Shaun Wright-Phillips but was unable to stop Chelsea drawing 1–1. Sinclair made his first start for Chelsea in the following Premier League game, against Manchester United at Stamford Bridge, and suffered a broken metatarsal after a challenge from Wes Brown.

Sinclair signed a new four-year deal on 15 August 2007. He was given squad number 17 for the new season, and made his first appearance as a late substitute in the 2007 FA Community Shield against Manchester United. On 25 September, he scored his first senior goal for the club in a 4–0 win against Hull City in the League Cup. He was picked in the starting eleven against Leicester City in the fourth round of the League Cup; he was involved in Chelsea's first two goals and his shot was turned onto the post by Leicester's goalkeeper.

Queens Park Rangers reportedly "beat off stiff competition from eight other Championship clubs" to sign Sinclair on loan for a month from 6 November 2007. Sinclair's last goal for Plymouth had been against Crystal Palace, and he followed this up by scoring his first for QPR against the same club.

He played four times for Chelsea on his return, before going out on loan again in February 2008. Ian Holloway, who had managed Sinclair at Plymouth Argyle, wanted to take the player to Leicester City, but Chelsea wanted him to join a club nearer the top of the table. On 28 February, Sinclair joined Charlton Athletic on loan until the end of the season. Finding his first-team opportunities limited at Charlton, he made just three appearances off the bench and the loan was terminated after a month.

On 27 March, Sinclair joined Crystal Palace on loan until the end of the season. He scored twice, against Hull and Burnley, in six appearances and helped Palace to finish fifth in the Championship. Sinclair played in the play-off semi-finals, in which Palace lost to Bristol City.

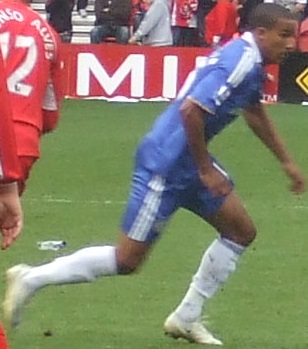
Sinclair playing for Chelsea in 2008

Sinclair was offered a chance by new Chelsea manager Luiz Felipe Scolari to prove himself as a first-team player, although he still played in most of the Reserves' matches. On 8 August 2008, Sinclair was handed the number 16 for Chelsea, swapping with José Bosingwa (who wore 16 during pre-season) who was given Sinclair's previous number 17. He was the second-youngest player in the Chelsea first team for the season, older than the youngest, striker Franco Di Santo, by 13 days. He made his first league appearance of the season at Middlesbrough on 18 October in Chelsea's 5–0 win.

In January 2009, Sinclair joined Championship club Birmingham City on loan for an initial period of one month, which was later extended to the remainder of the 2008–09 season. He made 14 appearances for the club, and returned to Chelsea on 4 May.

Interim Chelsea manager Guus Hiddink named Sinclair among the substitutes for the match against Blackburn Rovers on 17 May, but he did not play. New coach Carlo Ancelotti included him in the squad that travelled to the United States for a pre-season tour, where he featured in two matches.

Sinclair joined Premier League club Wigan Athletic on 6 August 2009 on loan for the 2009–10 season. He scored his first goal for Wigan in a 2–1 defeat at Hull City on 3 October, and his second, again against Hull, in the FA Cup on 2 January 2010.

=== Swansea City ===
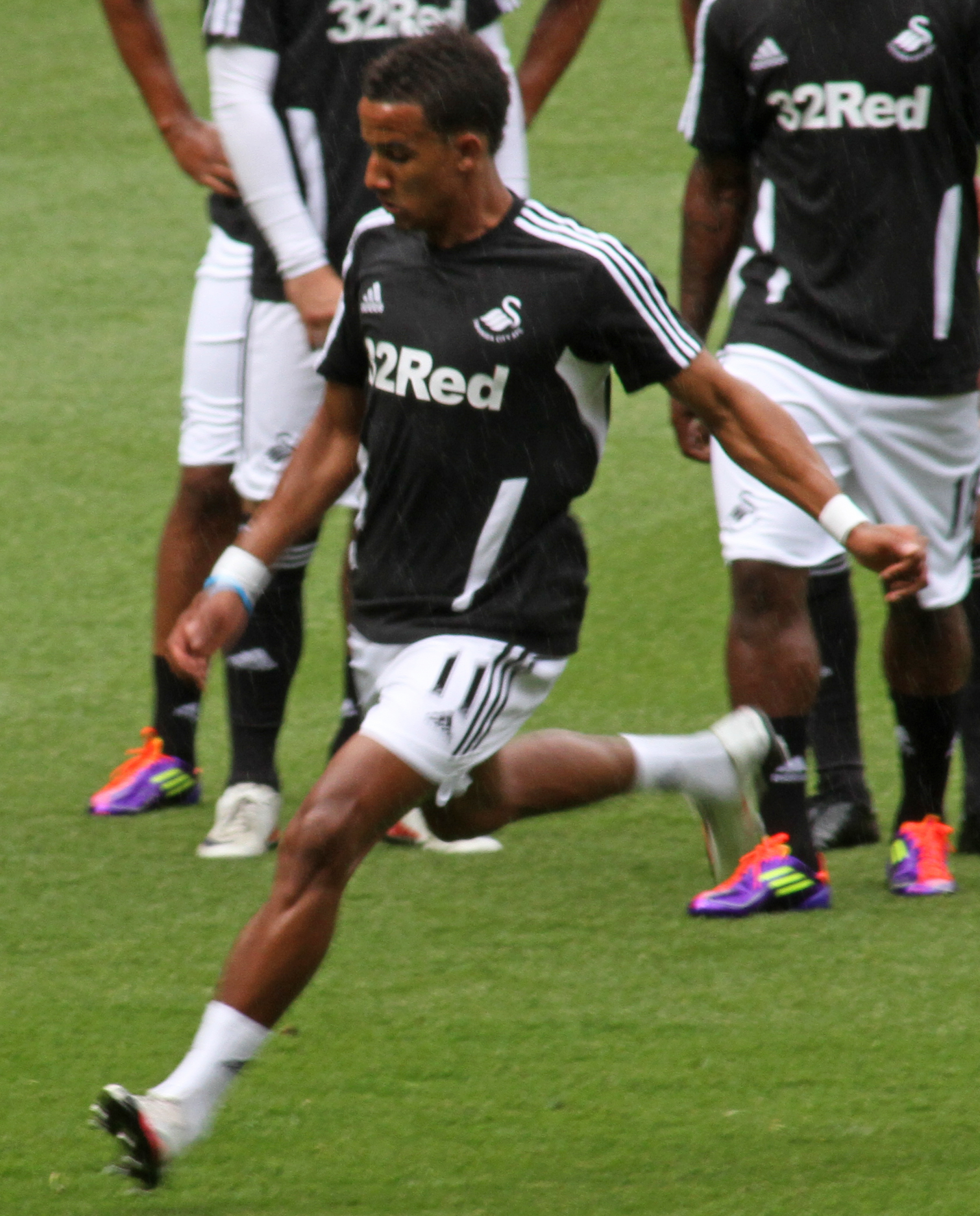
Sinclair training with Swansea City in 2011

In summer 2010, Sinclair was linked with moves to Blackpool, recently promoted to the Premier League, and Championship club Swansea City. He signed a three-year deal with Swansea City on 9 August 2010 for a £500,000 fee, with the potential for the fee to rise to £1 million depending on the club's future success. He made his debut in a 4–0 win against Preston North End on 14 August, during which he had a goal disallowed. He scored his first goal for the club against Tranmere Rovers in the League Cup, and his first League goal for Swansea was scored on 28 August in the 1–0 home win against recently relegated Burnley.

Sinclair scored his first career hat-trick on 21 September in a 3–1 League Cup win against Peterborough United. A brace against Leeds United on 26 February 2011 took his goal tally for the season to 21. Swansea qualified for the end-of-season play-offs and reached the final, played at Wembley Stadium on 30 May. In a "pulsating" match against Reading, Sinclair scored a hat-trick that included two penalties as Swansea won 4–2. The result meant a return to the top division of English football for the club, having been relegated from the old First Division in 1982–83, and they became the first Welsh club to reach the Premier League.

Sinclair scored Swansea's first Premier League goal on 17 September 2011 with a penalty in a 3–0 win against West Bromwich Albion. He became Swansea's main penalty taker, scoring penalties against Stoke City, Bolton Wanderers, Fulham and Arsenal. On 31 January 2012, Sinclair scored against his former club Chelsea, in a game that ended in a 1–1 draw. After scoring 13 penalties since joining the club, his streak ended on 15 March when Manchester City's Joe Hart saved his attempt. Swansea won the match 1–0, and Sinclair said he was still willing to continue taking Swansea's penalties.

With one season remaining on his contract with Swansea, it was confirmed on 17 August that Sinclair would not be signing a new deal with the club. On the opening day of the 2012–13 season, he scored in a substitute appearance as Swansea beat Queens Park Rangers 5–0 at Loftus Road.

=== Manchester City ===
Sinclair signed a four-year contract with champions Manchester City on 31 August 2012, moving from Swansea for a reported transfer fee of £8 million, including add-ons. He was given the number 11 shirt and made his debut on 15 September, playing 74 minutes of a 1–1 draw away to Stoke City.

He started against Arsenal on 23 September, coming off at half-time, and was thereafter relegated to the bench. He made only one further start all season, away at Borussia Dortmund in the UEFA Champions League group stage on 4 December, with both teams' final position already decided. His 12 other appearances that season were all coming on late from the bench. His final appearance of the season came as an 83rd-minute substitute on 21 April 2013, in a 3–1 loss away to Tottenham Hotspur. On 8 May, he had surgery on a blood clot in his shoulder, ending a frustrating season in which he played only 190 minutes of league football, after which he suggested that manager Roberto Mancini had not given him a fair chance.

Sinclair joined West Bromwich Albion on 22 August 2013 on a season-long loan, with the option to complete a permanent deal. He played regularly at the start of the season before a hamstring injury kept him out until December. Soon afterwards, manager Steve Clarke was sacked, and Sinclair played little under his successor, Pepe Mel.

=== Aston Villa ===
On 30 January 2015, after failing to break into the Manchester City starting eleven, Sinclair joined Aston Villa for the remainder of the season on loan. He made his debut in a 5–0 defeat at Arsenal on 1 February, replacing Andreas Weimann after 65 minutes. Sinclair scored his first goal for Villa after 89 minutes of a 2–1 win in the fifth round of the FA Cup against Leicester City on 15 February, and six days later, scored their only goal in a 2–1 defeat at home to Stoke City. He scored again in Villa's 2–0 FA Cup quarter-final victory over local rivals West Brom.

On 19 May 2015, after Villa had secured Premier League safety, it was announced that Sinclair would be joining on a permanent basis at the end of the season for an undisclosed fee, reported as £2.5 million, signing a four-year contract. He said that, "This is the happiest I have been in a long time."

On 25 August 2015, Sinclair scored a hat-trick against Notts County in a 5–3 victory for the home side in the second round of the League Cup. Four days later, in the Premier League, Sinclair scored both goals for Villa in a 2–2 draw with Sunderland.

=== Celtic ===
On 7 August 2016, Sinclair signed a four-year deal with Scottish Premiership champions Celtic. He made his debut later that day, coming on as a substitute for Stuart Armstrong against Hearts, and scored the winner in the 81st minute, slotting in Leigh Griffiths' cross to put Celtic 2–1 ahead. On 18 September, Sinclair became the first Celtic player since Jimmy McGrory in 1922 to score in each of his first five league matches.

Sinclair scored his first Celtic hat-trick on 2 April 2017, as the Hoops beat Hearts 5–0 at Tynecastle to wrap up a sixth consecutive Scottish league title. On 30 April, Sinclair was voted Player of the Year and Player's Player of the Year at Celtic's Player of the Year Awards. Afterwards, he told the club's website: "This is the best time and the happiest time in my career right now. To have the connection with the fans and all of them who voted for me, it just means so much to me." He ended his debut season with 25 goals, making him the club's second-highest scorer behind Moussa Dembélé, who scored 32 goals.

In May 2019, Celtic exercised a clause in Sinclair's contract to keep him at the club for a further season.

=== Preston North End ===
Sinclair signed a two-and-a-half-year contract with EFL Championship club Preston North End on 8 January 2020. Sinclair was released by the club at the end of the 2021–22 season.

=== Bristol Rovers ===
On 18 October 2022, Sinclair returned to his first club Bristol Rovers on a short-term basis until January 2023, having been training at the club for a number of weeks. On 22 October, he made his second debut for the club as a late substitute in a 2–2 draw against a former club of Sinclair's in Plymouth Argyle. Sinclair scored his first goal for the club on his first start on 5 November, the only goal in an FA Cup first round victory over Rochdale. On 17 January 2023, after weeks of negotiating, Sinclair signed a new eighteen-month contract with the club with his current deal close to expiring.

Despite having scored two goals in the first three league appearances of the 2023–24 season, Sinclair began to find first-team options limited. On 17 February 2024, he made a first league start in four months in a 3–1 defeat to Northampton Town. On 1 May 2024, the club announced that they had offered Sinclair a new contract. On 1 July 2024, the club confirmed that he had signed a new one-year deal.

On 8 August 2024, two days before Rovers' opening match of the 2024–25 season, Sinclair was appointed club captain. Following relegation, Sinclair was released at the end of the 2024–25 season.

== International career ==
Sinclair was selected for the England under-19s for their matches during October 2007, but, together with Andy Carroll and Ryan Bertrand, he was sent home after breaking a team curfew.

=== England U21s ===
On 12 November 2010, Sinclair was called up for the England under-21s for their friendly against the German under-21s. He earned his first cap playing in this friendly where England lost 2–0. In May 2011, Sinclair was named in the England squad for the European Under-21 Championship.

John Barnes, the former Jamaica coach, tried to convince Sinclair to play for the Jamaica senior team.

=== Great Britain Olympic football team ===
On 2 July 2012, Sinclair was named in Stuart Pearce's 18-man squad for the 2012 Summer Olympics. He scored the second goal in Team GB's second game of the tournament, against the United Arab Emirates.

== Personal life ==
Sinclair's brother Martin has cerebral palsy, and was selected in the Great Britain Cerebral Palsy football team for the 2012 Summer Paralympics. His younger brother Jake is also a footballer and plays for Mangotsfield United.

Sinclair became engaged to actress Helen Flanagan on 31 May 2018. They have two daughters, and one son. Their relationship ended in July 2022.

== Career statistics ==
As of end of 2024–25 season

Appearances and goals by club, season and competition
Club	Season	League			National cup (Note: Includes FA Cup, Scottish Cup)		League cup (Note: Includes Football League Cup/EFL Cup, Scottish League Cup)		Europe		Other		Total	
Club	Season	Division	Apps	Goals	Apps	Goals	Apps	Goals	Apps	Goals	Apps	Goals	Apps	Goals
Bristol Rovers	2004–05	League Two	2	0	0	0	0	0	–		0	0	2	0
Chelsea	2006–07	Premier League	2	0	0	0	1	0	0	0	0	0	3	0
Chelsea	2007–08	Premier League	1	0	2	0	3	1	0	0	1 (Note: Appearance in FA Community Shield)	0	7	1
Chelsea	2008–09	Premier League	2	0	1	0	1	0	0	0	0	0	4	0
Chelsea	Total		5	0	3	0	5	1	0	0	1	0	14	1
Plymouth Argyle (loan)	2006–07	Championship	15	2	3	2	—		—		—		18	4
Queens Park Rangers (loan)	2007–08	Championship	9	1	—		—		—		—		9	1
Charlton Athletic (loan)	2007–08	Championship	3	0	—		—		—		—		3	0
Crystal Palace (loan)	2007–08	Championship	6	2	—		—		—		2 (Note: Appearances in Championship play-offs)	0	8	2
Birmingham City (loan)	2008–09	Championship	14	0	—		—		—		—		14	0
Wigan Athletic (loan)	2009–10	Premier League	18	1	3	1	1	0	—		—		22	2
Swansea City	2010–11	Championship	43	19	2	1	2	4	—		3	3	50	27
Swansea City	2011–12	Premier League	38	8	1	0	1	0	—		—		40	8
Swansea City	2012–13	Premier League	1	1	—		0	0	—		—		1	1
Swansea City	Total		82	28	3	1	3	4	—		3	3	91	36
Manchester City	2012–13	Premier League	11	0	2	0	1	0	1 (Note: Appearances in UEFA Champions League)	0	—		15	0
Manchester City	2013–14	Premier League	0	0	—		—		—		—		0	0
Manchester City	2014–15	Premier League	2	0	0	0	1	0	0	0	1	0	4	0
Manchester City	Total		13	0	2	0	2	0	1	0	1	0	19	0
West Bromwich Albion (loan)	2013–14	Premier League	8	0	1	0	2	0	—		—		11	0
Aston Villa (loan)	2014–15	Premier League	9	1	3	2	—		—		—		12	3
Aston Villa	2015–16	Premier League	27	2	3	0	3	4	—		—		33	6
Aston Villa	Total		36	3	6	2	3	4	—		—		45	9
Celtic	2016–17	Scottish Premiership	35	21	5	3	3	1	7	0	—		50	25
Celtic	2017–18	Scottish Premiership	35	10	5	1	3	1	12 (Note: Eleven appearances and six goals in UEFA Champions League, one appearance in UEFA Europa League)	6	—		55	18
Celtic	2018–19	Scottish Premiership	33	9	5	5	3	1	14 (Note: Six appearances and one goal in UEFA Champions League, eight appearances and one goal in UEFA Europa League)	2	—		55	17
Celtic	2019–20	Scottish Premiership	2	0	0	0	1	1	4 (Note: Three appearances and one goal in UEFA Champions League, one appearance in UEFA Europa League)	1	—		7	2
Celtic	Total		105	40	15	9	10	4	37	9	—		167	62
Preston North End	2019–20	Championship	18	3	0	0	0	0	—		—		18	3
Preston North End	2020–21	Championship	37	9	0	0	3	0	—		—		40	9
Preston North End	2021–22	Championship	23	0	1	0	3	2	—		—		27	2
Preston North End	Total		78	12	1	0	6	2	—		—		85	14
Bristol Rovers	2022–23	League One	30	5	2	1	0	0	—		1 (Note: Appearance(s) in EFL Trophy)	0	33	6
Bristol Rovers	2023–24	League One	27	4	3	0	1	0	—		4	0	35	4
Bristol Rovers	2024–25	League One	41	3	3	0	1	0	—		0	0	45	3
Bristol Rovers	Total		98	12	8	1	2	0	—		5	0	113	13
Career total			492	101	45	16	34	15	38	9	12	3	621	144

== Honours ==
Birmingham City

- Football League Championship runner-up: 2008–09

Swansea City

- Football League Championship play-offs: 2011

Aston Villa

- FA Cup runner-up: 2014–15

Celtic

- Scottish Premiership: 2016–17, 2017–18, 2018–19
- Scottish Cup: 2016–17, 2017–18, 2018–19
- Scottish League Cup: 2017–18, 2018–19

Individual

- PFA Team of the Year: 2010–11 Championship
- Celtic Supporters' Player of the Year: 2016–17
- Celtic Players' Player of the Year: 2016–17
- PFA Scotland Players' Player of the Year: 2016–17
- SFWA Footballer of the Year: 2016–17
- PFA Scotland Team of the Year: 2016–17 Scottish Premiership
