= 2014–15 Southampton F.C. season =

Southampton F.C.
2014–15 season
- Chairman: Ralph Krueger
- Manager: Ronald Koeman
- Stadium: St Mary's Stadium
- Premier League: 7th
- FA Cup: Fourth round
- League Cup: Fifth round
- Top goalscorer: League: Graziano Pellè (12); All: Graziano Pellè (16)
- Highest home attendance: 31,723 v Liverpool (22 February 2015)
- Lowest home attendance: 27,598 v West; Bromwich Albion (23 August 2014)
- Average home league attendance: 30,652
Home colours	Away colours	Third colours

The 2014–15 Southampton F.C. season was the club's 16th season in the Premier League and their 38th in the top division of English football. It was also the club's first season with Dutch manager Ronald Koeman, who replaced Mauricio Pochettino on 16 June 2014. Southampton finished seventh in the Premier League, having won 18, drawn six and lost 14 matches. The club also made it to the fourth round of the FA Cup and the fifth round of the League Cup.

Following the end of the 2013–14 campaign, Southampton released six players. The club also made a number of sales, with striker Rickie Lambert, captain Adam Lallana, centre-back Dejan Lovren, left-back Luke Shaw, right-back Calum Chambers and striker Billy Sharp all leaving. Dani Osvaldo, Jordan Turnbull, Jos Hooiveld, Gastón Ramírez, Jake Sinclair, Jack Stephens, Artur Boruc and Will Britt were loaned out.

In the summer transfer window, the Saints made six full signings – winger Dušan Tadić from Twente, striker Graziano Pellè from Feyenoord, goalkeeper Fraser Forster from Celtic, striker Shane Long from Hull City, centre-back Florin Gardoș from Steaua București and attacking midfielder Sadio Mané from Red Bull Salzburg. The club also brought in Ryan Bertrand, Saphir Taïder and Toby Alderweireld on loans. Taïder left just three weeks after joining.

In January 2015 the club signed Bertrand on a full transfer, as well as bringing in midfielders Eljero Elia and Filip Đuričić on loan from Werder Bremen and Benfica, respectively. Midfielder Jack Cork left to join Swansea City, while loan deals were completed for Jos Hooiveld to Millwall, Dani Osvaldo to Boca Juniors and Lloyd Isgrove to Sheffield Wednesday. The loans of both Artur Boruc and Jack Stephens were extended until the end of the season.

Graziano Pellè finished the 2014–15 season as Southampton's top scorer with 16 goals in all competitions (including 12 in the league), while captain José Fonte was named the Fans' Player of the Season.

== Pre-season ==
Southampton began their pre-season preparations with a 4–0 win over Dutch side EHC Hoensbroek on 15 July. Winger Sam McQueen opened the scoring early in the 12th minute, and Calum Chambers made it two just before half-time. Billy Sharp scored a penalty in the 62nd minute, followed by a fourth goal from second-half captain Steven Davis two minutes later.

Two days later they travelled to face Belgian club KSK Hasselt, winning the game 6–0. New signing Graziano Pellè opened the scoring on his debut for the club with a brace in the 5th and 32nd minutes. Sam McQueen scored 14 minutes after the break and Hasselt defender Tom Weerts scored an own goal in the 67th minute. On 78 minutes Emmanuel Mayuka scored a penalty following a handball, and Sam Gallagher finished off the scoring late on.

Back in England, the Saints returned to action on 21 July, travelling to face League One side Swindon Town. The Premier League club largely dominated the match, although only won by a single goal courtesy of defender Jos Hooiveld's second-half conversion. Four days later, the Saints faced local Football League Championship club Bournemouth, again winning 1–0, with Lloyd Isgrove heading in the only goal of the game in the first half.

Southampton faced Brighton & Hove Albion on 31 July, winning against the Championship side 3–1. New signing Dušan Tadić opened the scoring with his first goal for the club, and Steven Davis made it two just before half-time. James Ward-Prowse completed Southampton's scoring in the second half with a long range effort, while Kazenga LuaLua pulled one back late on for Brighton. The Saints hosted their final pre-season friendly against German side Bayer 04 Leverkusen on 9 August, losing the game 1–0 to a Graziano Pellè own goal despite a number of goalscoring chances, especially in the first half.

15 July 2014 Friendly	EHC Hoensbroek	0–4	Southampton	Hoensbroek, Netherlands
18:00 BST		Report	McQueen 12'; Chambers 44'; Sharp 62' (pen.); Davis 64'	Stadium: SportPark de Dem

17 July 2014 Friendly	Hasselt	0–6	Southampton	Hasselt, Belgium
18:00 BST		Report	Pellè 5', 32'; McQueen 59'; Weerts 67' (o.g.); Mayuka 79' (pen.); Gallagher 88'	Stadium: Stedelijk Sportstadium

21 July 2014 Friendly	Swindon Town	0–1	Southampton	Swindon
19:30 BST		Report	Hooiveld 52'	Stadium: County Ground; Attendance: 908

25 July 2014 Friendly	Bournemouth	0–1	Southampton	Bournemouth
19:45 BST		Report	Isgrove 20'	Stadium: Dean Court; Attendance: 7,421; Referee: Andy Davies

31 July 2014 Friendly	Brighton & Hove Albion	1–3	Southampton	Brighton and Hove
19:45 BST	LuaLua 74'	Report	Tadić 19'; Davis 43'; Ward-Prowse 62'	Stadium: Falmer Stadium; Attendance: 7,296

9 August 2014 Friendly	Southampton	0–1	Bayer 04 Leverkusen	Southampton
17:00 BST		Report	Pellè 56' (o.g.)	Stadium: St Mary's Stadium; Attendance: 17,690; Referee: Mike Jones

== Premier League ==
=== August–October 2014 ===
Southampton began the 2014–15 Premier League campaign against Liverpool on 17 August 2014, losing 2–1. The home side opened the scoring through midfielder Raheem Sterling in the 23rd minute. Southampton equalised ten minutes after half-time through Nathaniel Clyne, but Liverpool striker Daniel Sturridge later put Liverpool back in front. The Saints returned to St Mary's Stadium for their first home game of the season on 23 August, drawing 0–0 with West Bromwich Albion. The following week the team picked up their first win of the season at West Ham United. The Hammers opened the scoring through Mark Noble, but just before half-time Morgan Schneiderlin scored his first goal of the season to equalise. Schneiderlin later struck again to give the Saints the lead, before Graziano Pellè scored to secure the victory.

Following a two-week international break, Southampton beat Newcastle United 4–0 at home. The Saints opened the scoring after just six minutes through a Pellè header, before the Italian striker doubled the lead in the 18th minute. Jack Cork and Morgan Schneiderlin scored in the second half to see the team move to fourth in the table. The club picked up their third consecutive league win the following week against Swansea City, with the only goal of the game coming from Victor Wanyama just ten minutes before the end of the match. On 27 September, the Saints hosted Queens Park Rangers, narrowly winning 2–1 to extend their winning run to six games. After a goalless first half, Ryan Bertrand opened the scoring for the Saints before Charlie Austin equalised for QPR. However, Pellè quickly regained the lead with an overhead kick just minutes later.

On 5 October, Southampton travelled to White Hart Lane to face former manager Mauricio Pochettino's Tottenham Hotspur, to whom they suffered their second defeat of the season. Christian Eriksen scored the only goal of the game shortly before half-time. Two weeks later, Southampton hosted Sunderland and picked up their biggest win ever in the Premier League, thrashing the visitors 8–0 at St Mary's. In addition to three own goals, Graziano Pellè scored two and Jack Cork, Dušan Tadić and Victor Wanyama scored one each. In their next match, Southampton beat Stoke City 1–0 (courtesy of Sadio Mané's first goal) to move up to second place in the table.

=== November–December 2014 ===
On 1 November, Southampton beat Hull City 1–0 to extend their winning run in all competitions to four games. Victor Wanyama scored the goal for the visitors after just two minutes from approximately 40 yards out after a misguided clearance. The following week the club hosted Leicester City, winning the game 2–0 thanks to a pair of goals by second-half substitute Shane Long, his first goals at St Mary's for the club. Following another international break, Southampton's winning run came to an end with a draw at Aston Villa on 24 November. The following weekend Southampton hosted reigning champions Manchester City, against whom they suffered their first loss since 5 October. City dominated the majority of the game, winning 3–0 to take Southampton's place in second position with the Saints dropping to third.

Just three days later, Southampton travelled to the Emirates Stadium to face Arsenal. Despite their dominance, it took Arsenal until the final minute of normal time to score, when Chilean striker Alexis Sánchez converted the only goal of the game. On 8 December, Southampton hosted Manchester United and lost 2–1. United opened the scoring early on through Robin van Persie; the Saints fought back with an equaliser from Graziano Pellè, although van Persie struck again later on to secure the win. After three games against sides in the top third of the table, Southampton faced 19th-placed Burnley the following weekend. Despite this, the Saints slipped to their fourth consecutive defeat when they lost to a single goal.

Southampton finally returned to winning ways in their last fixture before Christmas against Everton, winning the game 3–0. Toffees striker Romelu Lukaku headed the ball into his own net, before Pellè and centre-back Maya Yoshida scored in the second half to ensure that the Saints remained fifth in the Premier League going into Christmas. On Boxing Day, Southampton beat Crystal Palace 3–1. Sadio Mané opened the scoring after 17 minutes, Ryan Bertrand scored a second shortly after the break and Toby Alderweireld scored his first of the season just five minutes later. Scott Dann scored Palace's consolation goal. Two days later, the Saints hosted leaders Chelsea and held them to a 1–1 draw. Mané scored for the second consecutive match to open the scoring for the Saints, before Eden Hazard scored just before the break to equalise for the visitors.

=== January–February 2015 ===
Southampton started 2015 with a win, beating fifth-placed Arsenal 2–0 to remain fourth. The Saints opened the scoring after 34 minutes through Sadio Mané, before Dušan Tadić doubled the lead later on. Ten days later, the club beat Manchester United to move back up to third. Substitute Dušan Tadić scored shortly after his introduction in the second half to pick up the win. The following week, Southampton secured their unbeaten month of league fixtures when they beat Newcastle United to extend their unbeaten run to eight games. Eljero Elia scored his first goal for the club early on, however Newcastle equalised through Yoan Gouffran. Elia doubled his tally in the second half to give Southampton the win.

On 1 February Southampton suffered their first defeat since before Christmas when they lost 1–0 to Swansea City. Jonjo Shelvey scored the only goal of the game from the edge of the penalty area late in the second half to win the match for the Swans. The following week, the Saints narrowly beat manager-less Queens Park Rangers by a single late goal. After long periods of attacking play, Sadio Mané finally scored in the fourth minute of stoppage time at the end of the game. The club hosted West Ham United on 11 February, with the game ending as a goalless draw. On 22 February, Liverpool beat Southampton 2–0 with goals from Philippe Coutinho and Raheem Sterling, which was followed for the Saints by a 1–0 loss to 14th-placed West Bromwich Albion the following week due to an early Saido Berahino goal.

=== March–April 2015 ===
After three league games without scoring, on 3 March Southampton beat Crystal Palace by a single goal. The goal came as a result of a James Ward-Prowse setup for Sadio Mané in the 83rd minute. Twelve days later, the Saints faced league leaders Chelsea, extending their unbeaten run to two games with a 1–1 draw. Diego Costa opened the scoring in the 11th minute, but the hosts didn't manage to keep the lead for long as Dušan Tadić scored a penalty just eight minutes later. On 21 March, Southampton beat Burnley 2–0. In the 37th minute Shane Long scored from close range, and in the second half Clarets captain Jason Shackell scored an own goal to double the scoreline.

On 4 April the Saints lost 1–0 away to Everton, the only goal of the game coming from defender Phil Jagielka. The club picked up a 2–0 win over Hull City the following week, with goals coming from James Ward-Prowse and Graziano Pellè (his first goal since December). Southampton began a poor run of form at Stoke City on 18 April, losing 2–1 to the fellow mid-table side. Morgan Schneiderlin opened the scoring for the visitors in the first half, but goals from Mame Biram Diouf and Charlie Adam in the second left Saints in sixth place. The following week, the Saints were held to a 2–2 draw by Tottenham Hotspur. Two goals from Graziano Pellè were cancelled out by Erik Lamela and Nacer Chadli.

Southampton continued their poor form with a 2–1 loss to Sunderland on 2 May. Sadio Mané equalised Jordi Gómez's 21st-minute penalty quickly, but a second penalty for the Sunderland midfielder gave the home side the win. The Saints lost again the following week at Leicester City, with two first-half goals from Riyad Mahrez keeping the visitors from moving further up the Premier League table. Southampton picked up their final win in the penultimate game of the season, beating struggling Aston Villa 6–1 at St Mary's. Sadio Mané opened the scoring with the fastest Premier League hat-trick in history in the first 16 minutes, before Shane Long (two) and Graziano Pellè completed the scoring. The club missed out on sixth place in the table on the final day of the season when they lost 2–0 to second-placed Manchester City, with goals coming from Frank Lampard and Sergio Agüero.

=== League table ===
Pos	Team	Pld	W	D	L	GF	GA	GD	Pts	Qualification or relegation
5	Tottenham Hotspur	38	19	7	12	58	53	+5	64	Qualification for the Europa League group stage (Note: Since winners of the 2014–15 FA Cup, Arsenal, and winners of the 2014–15 Football League Cup, Chelsea, qualified for the Champions League based on league position, the spot awarded to the FA Cup winners (Europa League group stage) was passed to the sixth-placed team, Liverpool, and the spot awarded to the League Cup winners (Europa League third qualifying round) was passed to the seventh-placed team, Southampton, since those teams were the first teams in the table not already qualified for any European competition.)
6	Liverpool	38	18	8	12	52	48	+4	62	Qualification for the Europa League group stage
7	Southampton	38	18	6	14	54	33	+21	60	Qualification for the Europa League third qualifying round
8	Swansea City	38	16	8	14	46	49	−3	56	
9	Stoke City	38	15	9	14	48	45	+3	54	

Source: Barclays Premier League
Rules for classification: 1) Points; 2) Goal difference; 3) Goals scored; 4) Play-offs (only if needed to decide champion, teams for relegation or teams for UEFA competitions).

==== Results summary ====
Overall								Home						Away					
Pld	W	D	L	GF	GA	GD	Pts	W	D	L	GF	GA	GD	W	D	L	GF	GA	GD
38	18	6	14	54	33	+21	60	11	4	4	37	13	+24	7	2	10	17	20	−3

Last updated: 25 May 2015.
Source: Premier League

=== Results by matchday ===
Matchday	1	2	3	4	5	6	7	8	9	10	11	12	13	14	15	16	17	18	19	20	21	22	23	24	25	26	27	28	29	30	31	32	33	34	35	36	37	38
Ground	A	H	A	H	A	H	A	H	H	A	H	A	H	A	H	A	H	A	H	H	A	A	H	A	H	H	A	H	A	H	A	H	A	H	A	A	H	A
Result	L	D	W	W	W	W	L	W	W	W	W	D	L	L	L	L	W	W	D	W	W	W	L	W	D	L	L	W	D	W	L	W	L	D	L	L	W	L
Position	14	13	5	4	2	2	3	3	2	2	2	2	3	3	5	5	5	4	4	4	3	3	4	3	4	5	5	5	6	6	6	5	6	7	7	7	7	7

Updated to match(es) played on 25 May 2015. Source: statto.com
A = Away; H = Home; W = Win; D = Draw; L = Loss

=== Match results ===
17 August 2014 1	Liverpool	2–1	Southampton	Liverpool
13:30 BST	Sterling 23'; Sturridge 79'	Report	Clyne 56'	Stadium: Anfield; Attendance: 44,736; Referee: Mark Clattenburg

23 August 2014 2	Southampton	0–0	West Bromwich Albion	Southampton
15:00 BST		Report		Stadium: St Mary's Stadium; Attendance: 27,598; Referee: Roger East

30 August 2014 3	West Ham United	1–3	Southampton	London
15:00 BST	Noble 27'	Report	Schneiderlin 45', 68'; Pellè 83'	Stadium: Boleyn Ground; Attendance: 34,907; Referee: Mike Dean

13 September 2014 4	Southampton	4–0	Newcastle United	Southampton
15:00 BST	Pellè 6', 19'; Cork 54'; Schneiderlin 90'	Report		Stadium: St Mary's Stadium; Attendance: 29,678; Referee: Chris Foy

20 September 2014 5	Swansea City	0–1	Southampton	Swansea
15:00 BST		Report	Wanyama 80'	Stadium: Liberty Stadium; Attendance: 20,596; Referee: Jonathan Moss

27 September 2014 6	Southampton	2–1	Queens Park Rangers	Southampton
15:00 BST	Bertrand 54'; Pellè 68'	Report	Austin 66'	Stadium: St Mary's Stadium; Attendance: 30,504; Referee: Mark Clattenburg

5 October 2014 7	Tottenham Hotspur	1–0	Southampton	London
14:05 BST	Eriksen 40'	Report		Stadium: White Hart Lane; Attendance: 35,564; Referee: Mike Jones

18 October 2014 8	Southampton	8–0	Sunderland	Southampton
15:00 BST	Vergini 12' (o.g.); Pellè 18', 69'; Cork 37'; Bridcutt 63' (o.g.); Tadić 78'; Wanyama 79'; Van Aanholt 86' (o.g.)	Report		Stadium: St Mary's Stadium; Attendance: 29,615; Referee: Andre Marriner

25 October 2014 9	Southampton	1–0	Stoke City	Southampton
15:00 BST	Mané 33'	Report		Stadium: St Mary's Stadium; Attendance: 30,017; Referee: Jonathan Moss

1 November 2014 10	Hull City	0–1	Southampton	Kingston upon Hull
15:00 GMT		Report	Wanyama 3'	Stadium: KC Stadium; Attendance: 22,828; Referee: Martin Atkinson

8 November 2014 11	Southampton	2–0	Leicester City	Southampton
15:00 GMT	Long 75', 80'	Report		Stadium: St Mary's Stadium; Attendance: 31,297; Referee: Michael Oliver

24 November 2014 12	Aston Villa	1–1	Southampton	Birmingham
20:00 GMT	Agbonlahor 29'	Report	Clyne 81'	Stadium: Villa Park; Attendance: 25,311; Referee: Phil Dowd

30 November 2014 13	Southampton	0–3	Manchester City	Southampton
13:30 GMT		Report	Touré 51'; Lampard 80'; Clichy 88'	Stadium: St Mary's Stadium; Attendance: 30,919; Referee: Mike Jones

3 December 2014 14	Arsenal	1–0	Southampton	London
19:45 GMT	Sánchez 89'	Report		Stadium: Emirates Stadium; Attendance: 60,025; Referee: Andre Marriner

8 December 2014 15	Southampton	1–2	Manchester United	Southampton
20:00 GMT	Pellè 31'	Report	Van Persie 12', 71'	Stadium: St Mary's Stadium; Attendance: 31,420; Referee: Kevin Friend

13 December 2014 16	Burnley	1–0	Southampton	Burnley
15:00 GMT	Barnes 73'	Report		Stadium: Turf Moor; Referee: Mark Clattenburg

20 December 2014 17	Southampton	3–0	Everton	Southampton
15:00 GMT	Lukaku 38' (o.g.); Pellè 65'; Yoshida 82'	Report		Stadium: St Mary's Stadium; Attendance: 31,475; Referee: Jonathan Moss

26 December 2014 18	Crystal Palace	1–3	Southampton	London
15:00 GMT	Dann 86'	Report	Mané 17'; Bertrand 48'; Alderweireld 53'	Stadium: Selhurst Park; Attendance: 24,565; Referee: Mike Dean

28 December 2014 19	Southampton	1–1	Chelsea	Southampton
14:05 GMT	Mané 17'	Report	Hazard 45'	Stadium: St Mary's Stadium; Attendance: 31,641; Referee: Anthony Taylor

1 January 2015 20	Southampton	2–0	Arsenal	Southampton
15:00 GMT	Mané 34'; Tadić 56'	Report		Stadium: St Mary's Stadium; Attendance: 31,492; Referee: Craig Pawson

11 January 2015 21	Manchester United	0–1	Southampton	Manchester
16:00 GMT		Report	Tadić 69'	Stadium: Old Trafford; Attendance: 75,395; Referee: Phil Dowd

17 January 2015 22	Newcastle United	1–2	Southampton	Newcastle upon Tyne
17:30 GMT	Gouffran 29'	Report	Elia 14', 62'	Stadium: St James' Park; Attendance: 49,307; Referee: Robert Madley

1 February 2015 23	Southampton	0–1	Swansea City	Southampton
16:00 GMT		Report	Shelvey 83'	Stadium: St Mary's Stadium, Attendance: 30,943; Referee: Michael Oliver

7 February 2015 24	Queens Park Rangers	0–1	Southampton	London
15:00 GMT		Report	Mané 90+3'	Stadium: Loftus Road; Attendance: 18,082; Referee: Roger East

11 February 2015 25	Southampton	0–0	West Ham United	Southampton
19:45 GMT		Report		Stadium: St Mary's Stadium; Attendance: 31,241; Referee: Craig Pawson

22 February 2015 26	Southampton	0–2	Liverpool	Southampton
16:15 GMT		Report	Coutinho 3'; Sterling 73'	Stadium: St Mary's Stadium; Attendance: 31,723; Referee: Kevin Friend

28 February 2015 27	West Bromwich Albion	1–0	Southampton	West Bromwich
15:00 GMT	Berahino 2'	Report		Stadium: The Hawthorns; Attendance: 25,303; Referee: Phil Dowd

3 March 2015 28	Southampton	1–0	Crystal Palace	Southampton
19:45 GMT	Mané 83'	Report		Stadium: St Mary's Stadium; Attendance: 28,351; Referee: Martin Atkinson

15 March 2015 29	Chelsea	1–1	Southampton	London
13:30 GMT	Costa 11'	Report	Tadić 19' (pen.)	Stadium: Stamford Bridge; Attendance: 41,624; Referee: Mike Dean

21 March 2015 30	Southampton	2–0	Burnley	Southampton
15:00 GMT	Long 37'; Shackell 58' (o.g.)	Report		Stadium: St Mary's Stadium; Attendance: 30,864; Referee: Roger East

4 April 2015 31	Everton	1–0	Southampton	Liverpool
15:00 GMT	Jagielka 16'	Report		Stadium: Goodison Park; Attendance: 39,390; Referee: Roger East

11 April 2015 32	Southampton	2–0	Hull City	Southampton
15:00 GMT	Ward-Prowse 56' (pen.); Pellè 81'	Report		Stadium: St Mary's Stadium; Attendance: 30,359; Referee: Kevin Friend

18 April 2015 33	Stoke City	2–1	Southampton	Stoke-on-Trent
14:00 GMT	Diouf 47'; Adam 84'	Report	Schneiderlin 22'	Stadium: Britannia Stadium; Attendance: 26,467; Referee: Mark Clattenburg

25 April 2015 34	Southampton	2–2	Tottenham Hotspur	Southampton
12:45 BST	Pellè 29', 65'	Report	Lamela 43'; Chadli 70'	Stadium: St Mary's Stadium; Attendance: 31,622; Referee: Jonathan Moss

2 May 2015 35	Sunderland	2–1	Southampton	Sunderland
14:00 BST	Gómez 21' (pen.), 55' (pen.)	Report	Mané 22'	Stadium: Stadium of Light; Attendance: 39,613; Referee: Mike Jones

9 May 2015 36	Leicester City	2–0	Southampton	Leicester
15:00 BST	Mahrez 7', 19'	Report		Stadium: King Power Stadium; Attendance: 31,939; Referee: Roger East

16 May 2015 37	Southampton	6–1	Aston Villa	Southampton
12:45 BST	Mané 13', 14', 16'; Long 26', 38'; Pellè 81'	Report	Benteke 45+3'	Stadium: St Mary's Stadium; Attendance: 31,636; Referee: Robert Madley

24 May 2015 38	Manchester City	2–0	Southampton	Manchester
15:00 BST	Lampard 31'; Agüero 88'	Report		Stadium: Eithad Stadium; Attendance: 45,919; Referee: Chris Foy

== FA Cup ==
Ipswich Town (4 and 14 January 2015)

In the third round of the 2014–15 FA Cup, Southampton were drawn against Championship side Ipswich Town. The lower league visitors opened the scoring within 20 minutes courtesy of a Darren Ambrose header, although within 15 minutes Morgan Schneiderlin equalised for the Saints. The replay took place ten days later, with Southampton winning 1–0 thanks to a Shane Long goal in the first half to progress to the fourth round.

Crystal Palace (24 January 2015)

Ten days after the third round replay, the Saints faced Crystal Palace in the fourth round, losing 3–2. All five goals were scored in the first half, with Graziano Pellè opening the scoring after nine minutes, only to be cancelled out by Marouane Chamakh's strike just two minutes later. A 16th-minute own goal from Scott Dann put Southampton back on top five minutes later, but within another five minutes Palace had equalised through Yaya Sanogo. Chamakh scored the winner six minutes before half-time.

4 January 2015 Round 3	Southampton	1–1	Ipswich Town	Southampton
15:00 GMT	Schneiderlin 33'	Report	Ambrose 19'	Stadium: St Mary's Stadium; Attendance: 31,201; Referee: Martin Atkinson

14 January 2015 Round 3 replay	Ipswich Town	0–1	Southampton	Ipswich
19:55 GMT		Report	Long 19'	Stadium: Portman Road; Attendance: 27,923; Referee: Graham Scott

24 January 2015 Round 4	Southampton	2–3	Crystal Palace	Southampton
15:00 GMT	Pellè 9'; Dann 16' (o.g.)	Report	Chamakh 11', 39'; Sanogo 21'	Stadium: St Mary's Stadium; Attendance: 31,320; Referee: Jonathan Moss

== League Cup ==
Millwall (26 August 2014)

Southampton entered the 2014–15 League Cup in the second round, first facing Championship side Millwall. The Saints won the game 2–0, with Jack Cork and Graziano Pellè scoring their respective first goals for the club to send Southampton through to the third round.

Arsenal (23 September 2014)

In the third round, Southampton faced fellow Premier League side Arsenal, winning 2–1 to advance to the fourth round. Alexis Sánchez opened the scoring for the hosts in the 14th minute with a free kick, before Dušan Tadić scored his first goal for the club from the penalty spot. Nathaniel Clyne scored the second with a strike from outside the area.

Stoke City (29 October 2014)

Southampton faced Stoke City in the fourth round, winning 3–2 to advance to the fifth round for the first time in ten years. Graziano Pellè opened the scoring early on to put the Saints ahead, before Shane Long scored his first goal for the club on 30 minutes to double their lead. Early in the second half, Steven Nzonzi pulled one back for the hosts, and Mame Biram Diouf equalised for the Potters in the last ten minutes. The visitors' top scorer Pellè struck again later to secure the win.

Sheffield United (16 December 2014)

In the fifth round, Southampton travelled to face Sheffield United, losing 1–0 to the League One side to be eliminated from the tournament. Scottish striker Marc McNulty scored the only goal of the game in the second half.

26 August 2014 Round 2	Millwall	0–2	Southampton	London
19:45 BST		Report	Cork 53'; Pellè 90+3'	Stadium: The Den; Attendance: 6,014; Referee: Dean Whitestone

23 September 2014 Round 3	Arsenal	1–2	Southampton	London
19:45 BST	Sánchez 14'	Report	Tadić 20' (pen.); Clyne 40'	Stadium: Emirates Stadium; Attendance: 59,621; Referee: Keith Stroud

29 October 2014 Round 4	Stoke City	2–3	Southampton	Stoke-on-Trent
19:45 GMT	Nzonzi 49'; Diouf 82'	Report	Pellè 6', 88'; Long 30'	Stadium: Britannia Stadium; Attendance: 16,340; Referee: Lee Mason

16 December 2014 Round 5	Sheffield United	1–0	Southampton	Sheffield
19:45 GMT	McNulty 63'	Report		Stadium: Bramall Lane; Attendance: 21,906; Referee: Chris Foy

== Squad statistics ==
No.	Pos.	Nat.	Name	League		FA Cup		League Cup		Total		Discipline	
No.	Pos.	Nat.	Name	Apps.	Gls.	Apps.	Gls.	Apps.	Gls.	Apps.	Gls.	Yellow card	Red card
1	GK	(England)	Kelvin Davis	6(1)	0	0	0	0	0	6(1)	0	0	0
2	DF	(England)	Nathaniel Clyne	35	2	2	0	4	1	41	3	6	0
3	DF	(Japan)	Maya Yoshida	18(4)	1	0	0	1	0	19(4)	1	3	0
4	MF	(France)	Morgan Schneiderlin	24(2)	4	1	1	3	0	28(2)	5	7	1
5	DF	(Romania)	Florin Gardoș	5(5)	0	3	0	3	0	11(5)	0	2	1
6	DF	(Portugal)	José Fonte	37	0	3	0	4	0	44	0	8	0
7	FW	(Republic of Ireland)	Shane Long	16(16)	5	2(1)	1	3(1)	1	21(18)	7	2	0
8	MF	(Northern Ireland)	Steven Davis	32(3)	0	2(1)	0	3	0	37(4)	0	3	0
9	FW	(England)	Jay Rodriguez	0	0	0	0	0	0	0	0	0	0
10	MF	(Senegal)	Sadio Mané	24(6)	10	0	0	2	0	26(6)	10	6	0
11	MF	(Serbia)	Dušan Tadić	24(7)	4	3	0	2(1)	1	29(8)	5	2	0
12	MF	(Kenya)	Victor Wanyama	26(6)	3	2	0	4	0	32(6)	3	12	0
15	MF	(Serbia)	Filip Đuričić	3(6)	0	0	0	0	0	3(6)	0	1	0
16	MF	(England)	James Ward-Prowse	16(9)	1	3	0	2	0	21(9)	1	0	1
17	DF	(Belgium)	Toby Alderweireld	26	1	0	0	0(2)	0	26(2)	1	3	0
19	FW	(Italy)	Graziano Pellè	37(1)	12	2(1)	1	3	3	42(2)	16	9	0
21	DF	(England)	Ryan Bertrand	34	2	3	0	1(1)	0	38(1)	2	3	1
22	MF	(Netherlands)	Eljero Elia	9(7)	2	1	0	0	0	10(7)	2	2	0
23	GK	(England)	Fraser Forster	30	0	3	0	4	0	37	0	2	0
24	FW	(Zambia)	Emmanuel Mayuka	0(5)	0	0	0	0(1)	0	0(6)	0	0	0
25	GK	(Argentina)	Paulo Gazzaniga	2	0	0	0	0	0	2	0	0	0
27	MF	(Wales)	Lloyd Isgrove	0(1)	0	0(1)	0	1(1)	0	1(3)	0	0	0
28	MF	(England)	Harrison Reed	5(4)	0	1	0	0	0	6(4)	0	0	0
32	DF	(England)	Jason McCarthy	0(1)	0	0	0	0	0	0(1)	0	0	0
33	DF	(England)	Matt Targett	3(3)	0	1(1)	0	4	0	8(4)	0	3	0
34	MF	(England)	Jake Flannigan	0	0	0	0	0	0	0	0	0	0
37	MF	(England)	Omar Rowe	0	0	0	0	0	0	0	0	0	0
38	MF	(England)	Sam McQueen	0	0	0	0	0	0	0	0	0	0
40	FW	(England)	Sam Gallagher	0	0	0	0	0	0	0	0	0	0
41	GK	(United States)	Cody Cropper	0	0	0	0	0	0	0	0	0	0
42	MF	(England)	Jake Hesketh	1(1)	0	0	0	0	0	1(1)	0	1	0
43	GK	(Gibraltar)	Will Britt	0	0	0	0	0	0	0	0	0	0
44	GK	(Northern Ireland)	Chris Johns	0	0	0	0	0	0	0	0	0	0
45	FW	(England)	Ryan Seager	0(1)	0	0(1)	0	0	0	0(2)	0	0	0
46	MF	(England)	Dominic Gape	0(1)	0	0	0	0	0	0(1)	0	0	0
Players with appearances who left before the end of the season
18	MF	(England)	Jack Cork	5(7)	2	1	0	0(2)	1	6(9)	3	0	0
Players with appearances who spent the whole season out on loan
10	MF	(Uruguay)	Gastón Ramírez	0(1)	0	0	0	0(1)	0	0(2)	0	0	0

=== Most appearances ===
	Pos.	Nat.	Name	League		FA Cup		League Cup		Total		
	Pos.	Nat.	Name	Strt.	Sub.	Strt.	Sub.	Strt.	Sub.	Strt.	Sub.	Total
1	DF	(Portugal)	José Fonte	37	0	3	0	4	0	44	0	44
1	FW	(Italy)	Graziano Pellè	37	1	2	1	3	0	42	2	44
3	DF	(England)	Nathaniel Clyne	35	0	2	0	4	0	41	0	41
3	MF	(Northern Ireland)	Steven Davis	31	3	2	1	3	0	37	4	41
5	DF	(England)	Ryan Bertrand	34	0	3	0	1	1	38	1	39
5	FW	(Republic of Ireland)	Shane Long	16	16	2	1	3	1	21	18	39
7	MF	(Kenya)	Victor Wanyama	26	6	2	0	4	0	32	6	38
8	GK	(England)	Fraser Forster	30	0	3	0	4	0	37	0	37
8	MF	(Serbia)	Dušan Tadić	24	7	3	0	2	1	29	8	37
10	MF	(Senegal)	Sadio Mané	24	6	0	0	2	0	26	6	32

=== Top goalscorers ===
	Pos.	Nat.	Name	League		FA Cup		League Cup		Total		
	Pos.	Nat.	Name	Gls.	Apps.	Gls.	Apps.	Gls.	Apps.	Gls.	Apps.	GPG
1	FW	(Italy)	Graziano Pellè	12	38	1	3	3	3	16	44	0.36
2	MF	(Senegal)	Sadio Mané	10	30	0	0	0	2	10	32	0.31
3	FW	(Republic of Ireland)	Shane Long	5	32	1	3	1	4	7	39	0.17
4	MF	(France)	Morgan Schneiderlin	4	26	1	1	0	3	5	30	0.16
4	MF	(Serbia)	Dušan Tadić	4	31	0	3	1	3	5	37	0.13
6	MF	(England)	Jack Cork	2	12	0	1	1	2	3	15	0.20
6	MF	(Kenya)	Victor Wanyama	3	32	0	2	0	4	3	38	0.07
6	DF	(England)	Nathaniel Clyne	2	35	0	2	1	4	3	41	0.07
9	MF	(Netherlands)	Eljero Elia	2	16	0	1	0	0	2	17	0.11
9	DF	(England)	Ryan Bertrand	2	34	0	3	0	2	2	39	0.05

== Transfers ==
Players transferred in
Date	Pos.	Name	Club	Fee	Ref.
8 July 2014	MF	(Serbia) Dušan Tadić	(Netherlands) Twente	Undisclosed	
12 July 2014	FW	(Italy) Graziano Pellè	(Netherlands) Feyenoord	Undisclosed	
10 August 2014	GK	(England) Fraser Forster	(Scotland) Celtic	Undisclosed	
14 August 2014	FW	(Republic of Ireland) Shane Long	(England) Hull City	Undisclosed	
14 August 2014	DF	(Romania) Florin Gardoș	(Romania) Steaua București	Undisclosed	
1 September 2014	MF	(Senegal) Sadio Mané	(Austria) Red Bull Salzburg	Undisclosed	
2 February 2015	DF	(England) Ryan Bertrand	(England) Chelsea	Undisclosed	
Players transferred out
Date	Pos.	Name	Club	Fee	Ref.
1 July 2014	FW	(England) Rickie Lambert	(England) Liverpool	Undisclosed	
1 July 2014	DF	(England) Luke Shaw	(England) Manchester United	Undisclosed	
1 July 2014	MF	(England) Adam Lallana	(England) Liverpool	Undisclosed	
27 July 2014	DF	(Croatia) Dejan Lovren	(England) Liverpool	Undisclosed	
28 July 2014	DF	(England) Calum Chambers	(England) Arsenal	Undisclosed	
13 August 2014	FW	(England) Billy Sharp	(England) Leeds United	Undisclosed	
30 January 2015	MF	(England) Jack Cork	(Wales) Swansea City	Undisclosed	
Players loaned in
Start date	Pos.	Name	Club	End date	Ref.
30 July 2014	DF	(England) Ryan Bertrand	(England) Chelsea	2 February 2015	
6 August 2014	MF	(Algeria) Saphir Taïder	(Italy) Internazionale	1 September 2014	
1 September 2014	DF	(Belgium) Toby Alderweireld	(Spain) Atlético Madrid	End of season	
3 January 2015	MF	(Netherlands) Eljero Elia	(Germany) Werder Bremen	End of season	
2 February 2015	MF	(Serbia) Filip Đuričić	(Portugal) Benfica	End of season	
Players loaned out
Start date	Pos.	Name	Club	End date	Ref.
6 August 2014	FW	(Italy) Dani Osvaldo	(Italy) Internazionale	13 February 2015	
8 August 2014	DF	(England) Jordan Turnbull	(England) Swindon Town	End of season	
1 September 2014	DF	(Netherlands) Jos Hooiveld	(England) Norwich City	26 January 2015	
1 September 2014	MF	(Uruguay) Gastón Ramírez	(England) Hull City	End of season	
1 September 2014	FW	(England) Jake Sinclair	(Scotland) Hibernian	End of season	
1 September 2014	DF	(England) Jack Stephens	(England) Swindon Town	30 June 2015	
19 September 2014	GK	(Poland) Artur Boruc	(England) Bournemouth	End of season	
23 October 2014	GK	(Gibraltar) Will Britt	(England) Maidenhead United	20 November 2014	
26 January 2015	DF	(Netherlands) Jos Hooiveld	(England) Millwall	End of season	
12 February 2015	FW	(Italy) Dani Osvaldo	(Argentina) Boca Juniors	End of season	
18 March 2015	MF	(Wales) Lloyd Isgrove	(England) Sheffield Wednesday	End of season	
Players released
Date	Pos.	Name	Subsequent club	Join date	Ref.
30 June 2014	FW	(England) Lee Barnard	(England) Southend United	1 July 2014	
30 June 2014	MF	(England) Andy Robinson	(England) Bolton Wanderers	1 July 2014	
30 June 2014	DF	(England) Matt Young	(England) Sheffield Wednesday	1 July 2014	
30 June 2014	MF	(Barbados) Jonathan Forte	(England) Oldham Athletic	1 August 2014	
30 June 2014	MF	(England) Joe Curtis	(England) Brackley Town	9 August 2014	
30 June 2014	MF	(Brazil) Guly do Prado	(United States) Chicago Fire	6 January 2015	
