= Jake Sinclair =

Jake Sinclair may refer to:

- Jake Sinclair (footballer)
- Jake Sinclair (musician)
