= Martin Sinclair (footballer) =

English footballer

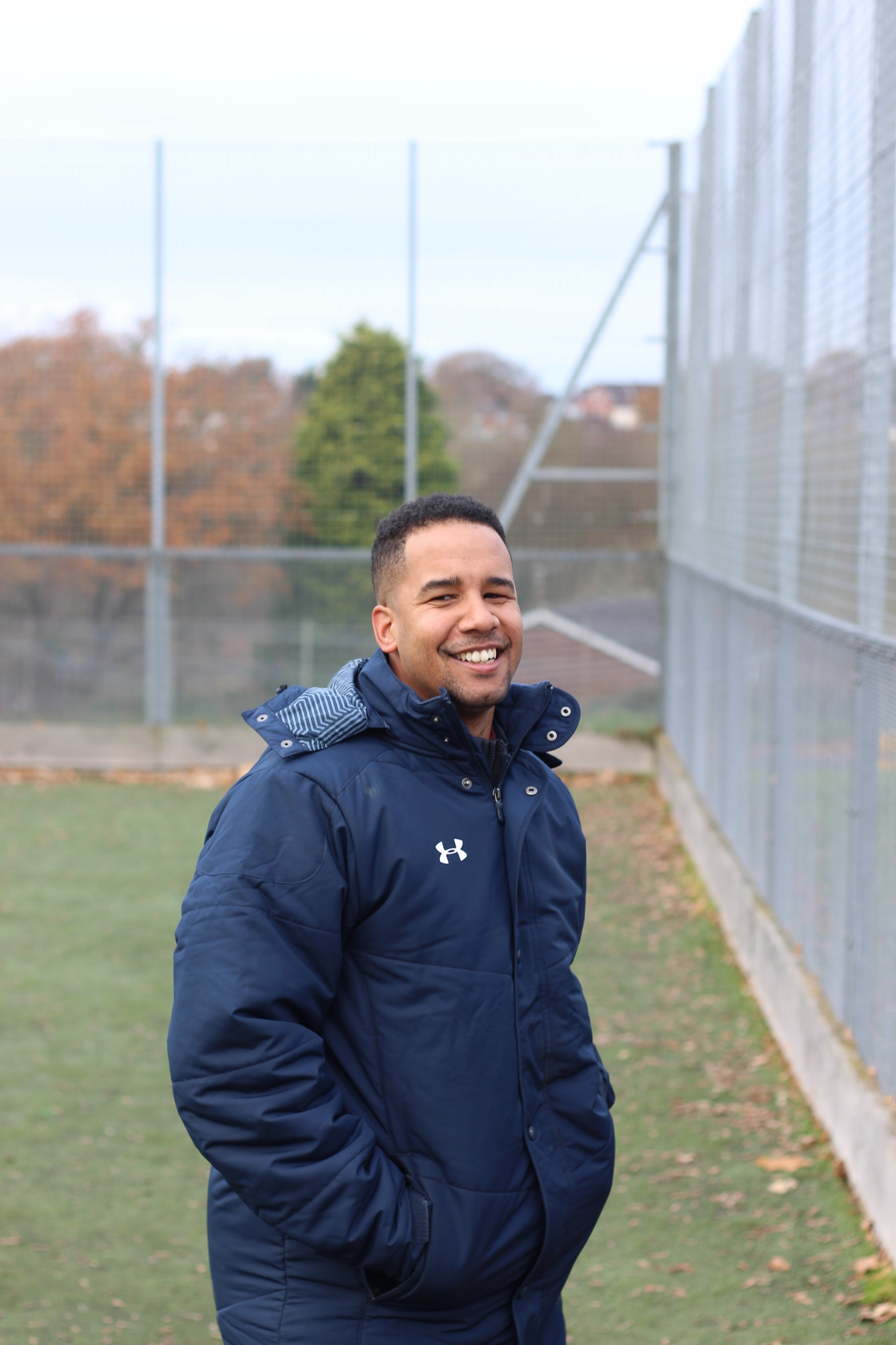
Martin Sinclair working at Saints Foundation's Pan Disability League

Martin Sinclair (born 27 June 1986) is an English footballer who plays for the England CP team, as well as being a SaintsAbility development officer for Saints Foundation. Sinclair's catchphrase is, "It's about showcasing players ability, rather than their disability".

== Early life ==
Martin Sinclair was born on 27 June 1986 in Bath, England. He is the brother of Bristol Rovers footballer Scott Sinclair, who represented Great Britain at the 2012 Summer Olympics, and Jake Sinclair, a member of the Southampton F.C. Academy, who also played on loan at Hibernian.

Sinclair was born with cerebral palsy but still had ambitions of playing football. As a teenager he fell off a slide, resulting in the ball and socket coming out of his hip; the injury was initially diagnosed as a damaged ligament, but when he went to hospital for an operation on his hand an x-ray revealed the real injury. He used a wheelchair for three years and had a hip replacement at the age of 21.

== Career ==
Whilst his brother Scott was playing for Plymouth Argyle, Sinclair was introduced to manager Ian Holloway who offered him a role coaching in the football in the community programme. It was during this that he found out about Plymouth's disabled side. He competes in 7-a-side matches for players with cerebral palsy. He was part of the Great Britain teams that won a bronze medal at the 2010 Paralympic World Cup and a silver medal at the 2012 event.

In 2012, Sinclair was selected to represent Great Britain at the 2012 Summer Paralympics as part of a twelve-player squad for the 7-a-side football event. Great Britain faced Brazil, the United States and Ukraine in the preliminary stage of the competition, with all matches being held at the Riverbank Arena. Sinclair and Scott became the first brothers to represent Great Britain at a Paralympic and Olympic Games in the same year, as Scott appeared for the Great Britain Olympic football team who reached the quarterfinals at the 2012 Summer Olympics .
