= The Robert Napier School =

Coordinates: 51°22′39″N 0°33′41″E

Location
- Third Avenue; Gillingham, Kent, ME7 2LX; England

Information
- Type: Secondary modern (non-selective)Academy
- Motto: Excellence in all we do
- Established: 1977
- Local authority: Medway
- Trust: Fort Pitt Thomas Aveling Academies UID 3123
- Department for Education URN: 138511 Tables
- Headteacher: Jenny Tomkins
- Gender: mixed
- Age: 11 to 18
- Enrolment: 1132
- Houses: Eagle, Harrier, Osprey, Kestrel
- Website: www.robertnapier.org.uk

The Robert Napier School, is a secondary school and sixth form with academy status, located in Gillingham, Kent, England. The school is a specialist Humanities School, and is non-selective, and does not have grammar school status. It has approximately 1100 students (according to Department for Education figures).

The school is a member of Fort Pitt Thomas Aveling Academies.

== History ==
The school sits on the former site of Gillingham Grammar School. The school moved to its new site on Third Avenue on 20 April 1977. The headmistress, Mrs Louisa Stanley, had been appointed in 1974. When the school opened in September 1977 there were only 680 students and 39 members of staff.

The origins of the Robert Napier School extend back to 1905 when the 'Napier Road School' opened at Napier Road, Gillingham. In 1923 Gillingham County Council (Grammar) School was opened by Kent County Council on what is now the site of the present school on Third Avenue. Shortly after its opening, the area experienced a sudden influx in population meaning many local schools rapidly reached their maximum capacity. It was not until the 1970s however, when the Gillingham County Council School moved sites and became The Howard School, Kent that the Robert Napier School was formed.

== Academics ==
The school is noted for the formal way that pupils must address teachers- calling them 'Sir' and 'mam'. The school aims to:

- Create a culture of high expectations
- Develop a clear sense of purpose for students who are given the drive and ambition to succeed
- A firm emphasis on good behaviour to provide a calm and orderly environment for students and staff
- High expectations for uniform, attendance, punctuality and excellent manners
- To develop every teacher skills using reflection to improve performance

The school chooses to teach a two year Key Stage 3 pupils are exposed to a broad and balanced curriculum of subjects. These provide a common foundation for the more specialised Key Stage 4. The only languages studied are Spanish and French. The school works on a two-week timetable.

In the three year Key Stage 4, students study a core of seven subjects, and three options one of which must be History or Geography GCSE. There are nineteen GCSE and BTEC options on offer. A pass in Maths and English is seen as essential for further study.

At Key Stage 5 eighteen A levels and BTEC Level 3s are offered. There is no provision for a modern language.

Ofsted has described how the school has improved; in 2019 this was rated a good school.

== Extra curriculum ==
There are several sporting clubs including-an early morning basketball academy which is very popular with pupils, especially those whose behaviour and attendance have been weaker in the past. Trips to local places of interest, such as Dover Castle and central London, visits to Europe and America have been organised. Ofsted noted that through such activities, pupils develop their spiritual, moral, social and cultural understanding.

== Houses ==
There are four houses named after birds of prey such as Eagle (red), Harrier (yellow), Osprey (Green) and Kestrel (blue).

== Former pupils ==
- Ryan Bertrand - footballer
