= Matt Targett =

English footballer (born 1995)

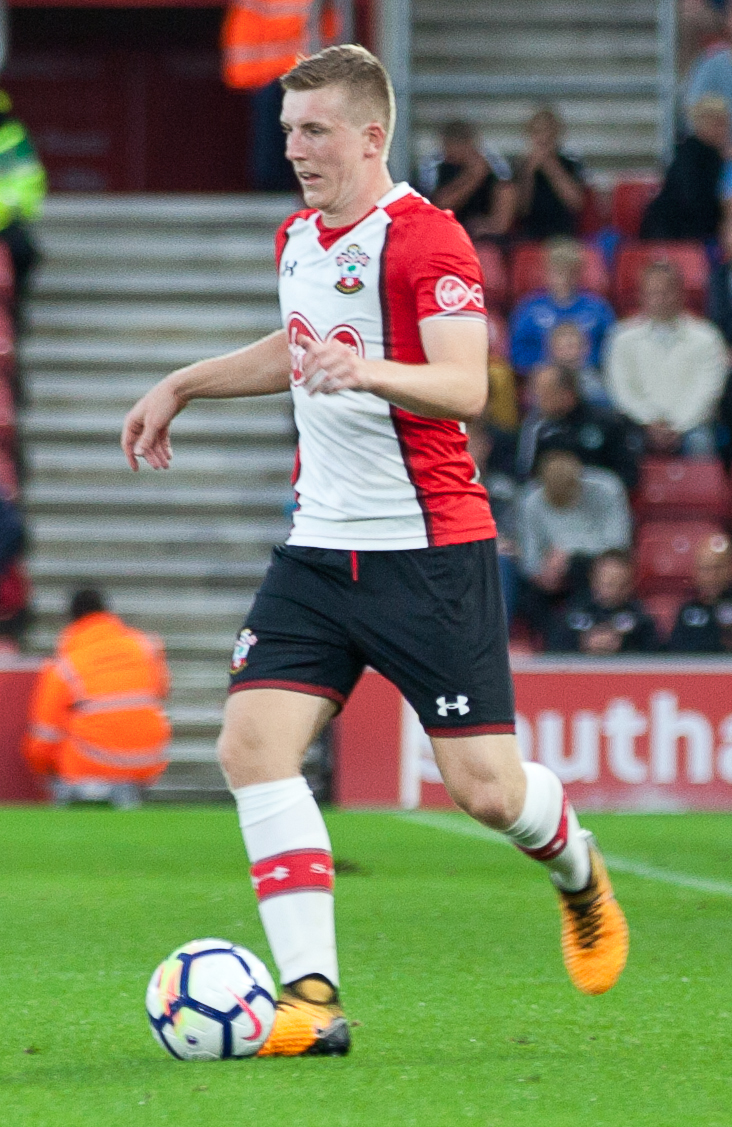
- Targett playing for Southampton in 2017

Personal information
- Full name: Matthew Robert Targett
- Date of birth: 18 September 1995 (age 31)
- Place of birth: Eastleigh, Hampshire, England
- Height: 6 ft 0 in (1.83 m)
- Position: Left-back

Team information
- Current team: Hull City
- Number: 23

Youth career
- 2003–2013: Southampton

Senior career*
Years	Team	Apps	(Gls)
2013–2019	Southampton	43	(1)
2018	→ Fulham (loan)	18	(1)
2019–2022	Aston Villa	83	(2)
2022	→ Newcastle United (loan)	16	(0)
2022–2026	Newcastle United	22	(0)
2025–2026	→ Middlesbrough (loan)	42	(4)
2026–	Hull City	1	(0)

International career
2013	Scotland U19	2	(0)
2013–2014	England U19	5	(0)
2014	England U20	5	(1)
2015–2016	England U21	12	(0)
- * Club domestic league appearances and goals as of 21:18, 22 August 2026 (UTC)

Matthew Robert Targett (born 18 September 1995) is an English professional footballer who plays as a left-back for Premier League club Hull City.

Targett came through the Southampton academy and was named their young player of the season in 2015, having broken into their Premier League squad during that campaign. He joined Fulham on loan in 2018, helping them achieve promotion by winning the Championship play-offs. In July 2019, Targett joined Aston Villa. He joined Newcastle United on loan in January 2022 before joining permanently in June.

Born in England, Targett represented Scotland at under-19 level, before switching his allegiance back to his native England and representing the country at under-19, under-20, and under-21 level.

== Club career ==
=== Southampton ===
Born in Eastleigh, Hampshire, Targett joined Southampton's academy at the age of eight, after being scouted by his local team. He was named in a senior matchday squad for the first time on 24 September 2013, and was unused as they defeated Bristol City 2–0 in the third round of the League Cup. On 26 April 2014, he was named in a Premier League game for the first time, remaining on the bench as Southampton won 2–0 at home against Everton.

On 26 August 2014, Targett made his first-team debut for Southampton in a League Cup second-round game at Millwall. He played the entire match, which Southampton won 2–0. His next appearance came on 23 September in a 2–1 victory at Arsenal in the following round of the tournament.

He made his first Premier League appearance on 27 September 2014, replacing Dušan Tadić in added time at the end of a 2–1 home victory over Queens Park Rangers. Targett's first start came on 28 December, a 1–1 draw against Chelsea in which regular left-back Ryan Bertrand was ineligible through being on loan from the visiting team.

He was named as Southampton's Young Player of the Season for 2014–15.

On 4 August 2017, Targett signed a new five-year contract with Southampton, extending his stay at the club to the summer of 2022.

On 22 January 2018, Targett joined Championship club Fulham on loan for the remainder of the season. He scored his first goal in a 1–1 draw with Bolton Wanderers on 10 February. On 26 May, he won promotion to the Premier League when Fulham beat Aston Villa 1–0 in the Championship Play-off Final, playing the full 90 minutes.

In his penultimate match for Southampton on 27 April 2019, Targett came on at half time for Oriol Romeu and scored his only goal for the club, in a 3–3 home draw with Bournemouth.

=== Aston Villa ===
On 1 July 2019, Targett signed for newly promoted Aston Villa for an undisclosed fee. He made his debut on 27 August in a 6–1 EFL Cup second round victory over Crewe Alexandra, although he was only able to play the first 42 minutes of the game before suffering a hamstring injury.

He recovered and returned to the squad on 25 September, in a 3–1 victory in the next round at Brighton & Hove Albion, and then made his first Premier League start for Villa three days later in a 2–2 home draw against Burnley. Targett scored his first goal for Aston Villa on 19 October, defeating Brighton 2–1 at Villa Park in the fourth minute of added time.

At the end of the 2020–21 season, Targett was the only outfield player to start all 38 Premier League matches, and was voted Players' Player of the Season by his teammates.

=== Newcastle United and loan to Middlesbrough ===
On 31 January 2022, Targett joined Newcastle United on loan from Aston Villa until the end of the 2021–22 season. He made his debut for the club on 8 February in 3–1 victory against Everton. On 8 June, Targett joined the club permanently, signing a four-year contract with the Magpies, for a reported fee of £15 million.

On 27 August 2025, Targett joined Championship side Middlesbrough on a season-long loan. He made his debut for the club on 30 August in a 1–0 victory against Sheffield United after he replaced Samuel Silvera in the 46th minute. On 13 September, Targett scored his first goal for the club in a 2–2 draw with Preston North End.

In June 2026, Newcastle announced Targett would leave the club when his contract expired in the summer.

=== Hull City ===
On 23 July 2026, Targett joined newly-promoted Premier League club Hull City on a two-year contract on a free transfer, with the club holding an option for a further year.

== International career ==
Targett represented Scotland at under-19 level before electing to play for England under-19s in September 2013. On 17 November 2014, Targett scored his first goal at international level in a 1–1 draw against Portugal for the England U-20s, followed by a goal in the penalty shoot-out. Targett made his debut for the under-21 side on 27 March 2015, starting in a 1–0 win against the Czech Republic in Prague.

He was part of the team that won the 2016 Toulon Tournament, their first such win for 22 years.

In April 2022, the Evening Chronicle reported that both England and Scotland were considering Targett for selection by their full national teams.

== Career statistics ==
As of match played 8 September 2026

Appearances and goals by club, season and competition
Club	Season	League			FA Cup		League Cup		Europe		Other		Total	
Club	Season	Division	Apps	Goals	Apps	Goals	Apps	Goals	Apps	Goals	Apps	Goals	Apps	Goals
Southampton	2013–14	Premier League	0	0	0	0	0	0	—		—		0	0
Southampton	2014–15	Premier League	6	0	2	0	4	0	—		—		12	0
Southampton	2015–16	Premier League	14	0	1	0	2	0	3 (Note: Appearances in UEFA Europa League)	0	—		20	0
Southampton	2016–17	Premier League	5	0	0	0	1	0	2	0	—		8	0
Southampton	2017–18	Premier League	2	0	0	0	0	0	—		—		2	0
Southampton	2018–19	Premier League	16	1	2	0	3	0	—		—		21	1
Southampton	Total		43	1	5	0	10	0	5	0	—		63	1
Fulham (loan)	2017–18	Championship	18	1	—		—		—		3 (Note: Appearances in Championship play-offs)	0	21	1
Aston Villa	2019–20	Premier League	28	1	0	0	4	1	—		—		32	2
Aston Villa	2020–21	Premier League	38	0	0	0	0	0	—		—		38	0
Aston Villa	2021–22	Premier League	17	1	1	0	1	0	—		—		19	1
Aston Villa	Total		83	2	1	0	5	1	—		—		89	3
Newcastle United (loan)	2021–22	Premier League	16	0	—		—		—		—		16	0
Newcastle United	2022–23	Premier League	17	0	0	0	2	0	—		—		19	0
Newcastle United	2023–24	Premier League	3	0	0	0	2	0	2 (Note: Appearances in UEFA Champions League)	0	—		7	0
Newcastle United	2024–25	Premier League	2	0	3	0	0	0	—		—		5	0
Newcastle United	Newcastle total		38	0	3	0	4	0	2	0	—		47	0
Middlesbrough (loan)	2025–26	Championship	42	4	1	0	—		—		3	0	46	4
Hull City	2026–27	Premier League	1	0	0	0	2	0	—		—		3	0
Career total			225	8	10	0	21	1	7	0	6	0	269	9

== Honours ==
Southampton

- U21 Premier League Cup: 2014–15

Fulham

- EFL Championship play-offs: 2018

Aston Villa

- EFL Cup runner-up: 2019–20

Newcastle United

- EFL Cup: 2024–25; runner-up: 2022–23

England U21

- Toulon Tournament: 2016

Individual

- Aston Villa Players' Player of the Season: 2020–21
