= 2014–15 Under-21 Premier League Cup =

Tournament details
- Country: England; Wales
- Teams: 46

Final positions
- Champions: Southampton (1st title)
- Runners-up: Blackburn Rovers

Tournament statistics
- Matches played: 46
- Goals scored: 130 (2.83 per match)
- Top goal scorer(s): (England) Ryan Seager (Southampton); 5 goals

The 2014-15 Under-21 Premier League Cup, known as the Barclays Under-21 Premier League Cup for sponsorship reasons, was the second edition of the U21 Premier League Cup.

== Participants ==
There were six fewer participants than the previous season. The eight clubs that chose not to re-enter were Arsenal, Chelsea, Crystal Palace, Coventry City, Notts County, Bristol Rovers, Exeter City and Torquay United. The two clubs entering the competition for the first time were Charlton Athletic and Ipswich Town.

=== Category 1 ===
North	South
Blackburn Rovers	Aston Villa
Bolton Wanderers	Brighton & Hove Albion
Derby County	Fulham
Everton	Norwich City
Leicester City	Reading
Manchester City	Southampton
Middlesbrough	West Bromwich Albion
Newcastle United	West Ham United
Stoke City	Wolverhampton Wanderers
Sunderland	

=== Category 2 ===
North	South
Barnsley	Bristol City
Birmingham City	Cardiff City
Crewe Alexandra	Charlton Athletic
Huddersfield Town	Colchester United
Leeds United	Ipswich Town
Nottingham Forest	Millwall
Sheffield United	Queens Park Rangers
Sheffield Wednesday	Swansea City

=== Category 3 ===
North	South
Burnley	AFC Wimbledon
Doncaster Rovers	AFC Bournemouth
Hull City	Gillingham
Preston North End	Peterborough United
Wigan Athletic	Plymouth Argyle
	Watford

== Matches ==
=== First qualifying round ===
This round commences the week beginning 15 September 2014. The round was contested by 10 of the 11 clubs with Category 3 rated academies, with another, Doncaster Rovers, receiving a bye to the Second Qualifying Round.

==== Northern Section ====
Date	Home team	Score	Away team	Attendance
16 Sep	Wigan Athletic	5–0	Preston North End	
30 Sep	Burnley	0–2	Hull City	

==== Southern Section ====
Date	Home team	Score	Away team	Attendance
23 Sep	Watford	1–0	Peterborough United	
23 Sep	Gillingham	1–0†	Plymouth Argyle	
23 Sep	AFC Wimbledon	1–0	A.F.C. Bournemouth	

† – After extra time

=== Second qualifying round ===
This round commences the week beginning 6 October 2014. The round was contested by Doncaster Rovers, who received a bye to this round, the five First Qualifying Round winners, and 20 of the 22 clubs with Category 2 rated academies - the other two, Crewe Alexandra and Queens Park Rangers, received a bye to the Round of 32.

==== Northern Section ====
Date	Home team	Score	Away team	Attendance
8 Oct	Nottingham Forest	1–3	Wigan Athletic	
20 Oct	Sheffield Wednesday	0–1	Hull City	198
6 Oct	Leeds United	6–0	Doncaster Rovers	
6 Oct	Birmingham City	1–3	Sheffield United	96
8 Oct	Huddersfield Town	1–0	Barnsley	148

==== Southern Section ====
Date	Home team	Score	Away team	Attendance
27 Oct	Bristol City	1–2†	Watford	
28 Oct	Cardiff City	0–1	Gillingham	
7 Oct	Charlton Athletic	4–0	AFC Wimbledon	214
6 Oct	Millwall	1–1	Colchester United	
Millwall won 6–5 on penalties.
6 Oct	Ipswich Town	2–1	Swansea City	

† – After extra time

=== Round of 32 ===
This round begins the week beginning 24 November 2014. The nineteen Category 1 sides were joined in this round by the twelve teams progressing from the Second Qualifying round. Blackburn Rovers drew a bye to the Round of 16.

==== Northern Section ====
Date	Home team	Score	Away team	Attendance
8 Dec	Sheffield United	0–0	Stoke City	
Stoke City won 5–4 on penalties.
9 Dec	Leicester City	1–2	Leeds United	
5 Dec	Manchester City	2–4	Sunderland	
24 Nov	Middlesbrough	1–0	Hull City	196
12 Dec	Bolton Wanderers	4–4	Wigan Athletic	
Bolton Wanderers won 4–1 on penalties.
15 Dec	Huddersfield Town	2–0	Everton	
24 Nov	Newcastle United	2–1†	Crewe Alexandra	317

==== Southern Section ====
Date	Home team	Score	Away team	Attendance
1 Dec	Fulham	2–4	Norwich City	123
25 Nov	West Ham United	1–1	Millwall	
West Ham United won 8–7 on penalties.
24 Nov	Reading	3–0	Queens Park Rangers	
25 Nov	Watford	3–2	Gillingham	
22 Dec	Charlton Athletic	1–0	Brighton & Hove Albion	
24 Nov	Ipswich Town	0–1	Southampton	323
25 Nov	Wolverhampton Wanderers	0–1	Aston Villa	147
20 Nov	West Bromwich Albion	0–1	Derby County	

† – After extra time.

=== Round of 16 ===
Date	Home team	Score	Away team	Attendance
12 Jan	Blackburn Rovers	3–2	Aston Villa	240
22 Dec	Bolton Wanderers	1–3†	Reading	
8 Jan	Derby County	0–0	Sunderland	
Derby County won 4–3 on penalties.
6 Jan	Huddersfield Town	0–0	Charlton Athletic	
Huddersfield Town won 6–5 on penalties.

Date	Home team	Score	Away team	Attendance
5 Jan	Middlesbrough	1–4	Stoke City	
22 Dec	Newcastle United	4–1	West Ham United	468
15 Jan	Southampton	2–0	Norwich City	323
6 Jan	Watford	6–1	Leeds United	

† – After extra time.

=== Quarter-finals ===
Date	Home team	Score	Away team	Attendance
2 Feb	Derby County	1–0	Stoke City	
3 Feb	Huddersfield Town	0–1	Reading	

Date	Home team	Score	Away team	Attendance
20 Jan	Newcastle United	0–1	Blackburn Rovers	509
12 Feb	Southampton	3–2	Watford	

† – After extra time.

=== Semi-finals ===
Date	Home team	Score	Away team	Attendance
5 Mar	Southampton	4–2	Derby County	

Date	Home team	Score	Away team	Attendance
26 Feb	Blackburn Rovers	2–1†	Reading	196

† – After extra time.

=== Final ===
==== First leg ====
13 April 2015
19:00 BST

Blackburn Rovers	0–0	Southampton
	Report

Ewood Park
Attendance: 995
Referee: Joseph Johnson

Blackburn Rovers	Southampton

Note: Flags indicate national team as defined under FIFA eligibility rules; some limited exceptions apply. Players may hold more than one non-FIFA nationality.

Blackburn Rovers
No.	Pos.	Nation	Player
1	GK	ESP	David Raya
2	DF	NAM	Ryan Nyambe
3	DF	ENG	Jack Doyle
4	DF	ENG	Connor Thompson
5	DF	SCO	Sam Lavelle
6	DF	WAL	Sam Jones
7	FW	ENG	Devarn Green (substituted off) 39'
8	DF	ENG	Bradley Bauress
9	FW	ENG	Dean Rittenburg (substituted off) 90'
10	MF	ENG	David Carson
11	MF	ENG	Connor Mahoney
Sub	DF	ENG	Kellen Daly
Sub	GK	SCO	Ryan Crump
Sub	MF	AUS	Hyuga Tanner
Sub	MF	ENG	Lewis Mansell (substituted on) 39'
Sub	MF	ENG	Sam Joel (substituted on) 90'

Southampton
No.	Pos.	Nation	Player
1	GK	ARG	Paulo Gazzaniga
2	DF	UGA	Bevis Mugabi
3	DF	ENG	Matt Targett
4	MF	ENG	Dominic Gape
5	DF	ENG	Jason McCarthy
6	DF	ENG	Will Wood
7	FW	ENG	Sam Gallagher (substituted off) 81'
8	MF	ENG	Harrison Reed
9	FW	ENG	Ryan Seager
10	MF	ENG	Jake Hesketh
11	MF	ENG	Sam McQueen (substituted off) 81'
Sub	MF	ENG	Josh Sims (substituted on) 81'
Sub	GK	GIB	Will Britt
Sub	FW	ENG	Jake Sinclair (substituted on) 81'
Sub	MF	ENG	Callum Slattery
Sub	DF	NGA	Josh Debayo

==== Second leg ====
20 April 2015
19:00 BST

Southampton	2–1 (a.e.t.)	Blackburn Rovers
Seager 52'; Gallagher 94'	Report	Targett 69' (o.g.)

St. Mary's Stadium
Attendance: 12,356
Referee: Antony Coggins

Southampton	Blackburn Rovers

Note: Flags indicate national team as defined under FIFA eligibility rules; some limited exceptions apply. Players may hold more than one non-FIFA nationality.

Southampton
No.	Pos.	Nation	Player
1	GK	ARG	Paulo Gazzaniga
2	DF	UGA	Bevis Mugabi
3	DF	ENG	Matt Targett
4	MF	ENG	Dominic Gape
5	DF	ENG	Jason McCarthy
6	DF	ENG	Will Wood
7	FW	ENG	Sam Gallagher
8	MF	ENG	Harrison Reed (red card) 88'
9	FW	ENG	Ryan Seager (substituted off) 90'
10	MF	ENG	Jake Hesketh
11	MF	ENG	Sam McQueen (substituted off) 77'
Sub	MF	ENG	Josh Sims (substituted on) 90'
Sub	GK	GIB	Will Britt
Sub	FW	ENG	Jake Sinclair (substituted on) 77'
Sub	MF	ENG	Callum Slattery
Sub	DF	NGA	Josh Debayo

Blackburn Rovers
No.	Pos.	Nation	Player
1	GK	ESP	David Raya
2	DF	NAM	Ryan Nyambe
3	DF	ENG	Jack Doyle
4	DF	ENG	Connor Thompson (substituted off) 91'
5	DF	SCO	Sam Lavelle
6	DF	WAL	Sam Jones
7	FW	ENG	Dean Rittenburg (substituted off) 74'
8	DF	ENG	Bradley Bauress
9	MF	ENG	Lewis Mansell
10	MF	ENG	David Carson (substituted off) 57'
11	MF	ENG	Connor Mahoney
Sub	DF	ENG	Kellen Daly
Sub	GK	SCO	Ryan Crump
Sub	MF	AUS	Hyuga Tanner (substituted on) 74'
Sub	MF	ENG	Lewis Hardcastle (substituted on) 57'
Sub	MF	ENG	Sam Joel (substituted on) 91'

== See also ==
- 2014–15 Professional U21 Development League
- 2014–15 FA Cup
- 2014–15 FA Youth Cup
- 2014–15 in English football
