= Ryan Seager =

English footballer (born 1996)

Personal information
- Full name: Ryan Paul Seager
- Date of birth: 5 February 1996 (age 30)
- Place of birth: Yeovil, England
- Height: 1.76 m (5 ft 9 in)
- Position: Forward

Team information
- Current team: Havant & Waterlooville
- Number: 9

Youth career
- 2004–2014: Southampton

Senior career*
Years	Team	Apps	(Gls)
2014–2019	Southampton	1	(0)
2016	→ Crewe Alexandra (loan)	4	(1)
2017–2018	→ Milton Keynes Dons (loan)	14	(1)
2018	→ Yeovil Town (loan)	7	(1)
2018–2019	→ Telstar (loan)	11	(2)
2019–2020	Yeovil Town	13	(1)
2019–2020	→ Havant & Waterlooville (loan)	4	(0)
2020	→ Frome Town (loan)	0	(0)
2020–2022	Hungerford Town	59	(41)
2022–2023	Dorking Wanderers	56	(14)
2023–	Havant & Waterlooville	121	(87)

International career^{‡}
2013	England U17	2	(0)
- * Club domestic league appearances and goals as of 17:59, 11 October 2026 (UTC) ‡ National team caps and goals as of 19:37, 24 January 2015 (UTC)

Ryan Paul Seager (born 5 February 1996) is an English professional footballer who plays as a forward for Southern League Premier Division South side Havant & Waterlooville. He has been capped twice for England U17.

== Club career ==
=== Southampton ===
Seager made his debut for the club in an FA Cup fourth round tie against Crystal Palace on 24 January 2015, replacing Shane Long in the 72nd minute of a 3–2 home defeat.

On 29 January 2016, Seager signed for League One side Crewe Alexandra on a one-month youth loan deal. He scored his first career goal for Crewe on 16 February in a 2–2 draw at Rochdale, but was badly injured in the same game; the injury was subsequently diagnosed as a ruptured anterior cruciate ligament, and Seager returned to Southampton for rehabilitation. In July 2017, he signed a new two-year contract with the club, before completing a season-long loan switch to League One club Milton Keynes Dons. Seager scored his first goal for Milton Keynes Dons in a 1–4 home EFL Cup second round defeat to Swansea City.

On 26 January 2018, Seager was recalled by Southampton and immediately sent out on loan to League Two club Yeovil Town.

On 14 July 2018, it was announced that Seager had joined Dutch side Telstar on a season-long loan. Seager returned to Southampton in January 2019.

=== Yeovil Town ===
On 29 January 2019, Seager signed for his hometown club Yeovil Town on a free transfer from Southampton.

After struggling to get first team minutes at Yeovil, on 4 September 2019, Seager joined National League South side Havant & Waterlooville on loan until January 2020. On 12 March 2020, Seager joined Southern League Division One South side Frome Town on loan until the end of the 2019–20 season.

=== Hungerford Town ===
On 9 July 2020, following the expiry of his contract with Yeovil Town, Seager joined National League South club Hungerford Town on a two-year deal. Seagar scored 14 goals in just 19 matches for Hungerford before the season was concluded early and declared null and void on 18 February 2021.

=== Dorking Wanderers ===
On 8 June 2022, Seager joined newly promoted National League side Dorking Wanderers for an undisclosed fee.

=== Havant & Waterlooville ===
On 7 November 2023, Seager joined National League South side Havant & Waterlooville for an undisclosed fee. In an August 2025 Southern Football League Premier South match against Evesham, Seager scored the only goal of the game with a strike from the centre circle, having noticed the opposition goalkeeper off his line.

== International career ==
Seager received his first international call-up, in January 2013, to the England national under-17 team for the following month's Algarve Tournament. He made two appearances in the tournament, with England failing to win any of their matches.

== Career statistics ==
As of match played 10 October 2026

Appearances and goals by club, season and competition
Season	Club	League			National Cup		League Cup		Other		Total	
Season	Club	Division	Apps	Goals	Apps	Goals	Apps	Goals	Apps	Goals	Apps	Goals
Southampton	2014–15	Premier League	1	0	1	0	0	0	—		2	0
Southampton	2015–16	Premier League	0	0	0	0	0	0	—		0	0
Southampton	2016–17	Premier League	0	0	0	0	0	0	—		0	0
Southampton	2017–18	Premier League	0	0	0	0	0	0	—		0	0
Southampton	2018–19	Premier League	0	0	0	0	0	0	—		0	0
Southampton	Total		1	0	1	0	0	0	—		2	0
Crewe Alexandra (loan)	2015–16	League One	4	1	0	0	0	0	0	0	4	1
Milton Keynes Dons (loan)	2017–18	League One	14	1	2	0	2	1	4 (Note: Appearances in the EFL Trophy)	1	22	3
Yeovil Town (loan)	2017–18	League Two	7	1	—		—		—		7	1
Telstar (loan)	2018–19	Eerste Divisie	11	2	1	0	—		—		12	2
Yeovil Town	2018–19	League Two	11	1	—		—		—		11	1
Yeovil Town	2019–20	National League	2	0	—		—		0	0	2	0
Yeovil Town	Total		13	1	—		—		0	0	13	1
Havant & Waterlooville (loan)	2019–20	National League South	4	0	3	1	—		0	0	7	1
Frome Town (loan)	2019–20	SL Division One South	0	0	—		—		0	0	0	0
Hungerford Town	2020–21	National League South	19	14	1	0	—		1 (Note: Appearance(s) in the FA Trophy)	0	21	14
Hungerford Town	2021–22	National League South	40	27	3	3	—		2	1	45	31
Hungerford Town	Total		59	41	4	3	—		3	1	66	45
Dorking Wanderers	2022–23	National League	40	13	1	0	—		3	2	44	15
Dorking Wanderers	2023–24	National League	16	1	1	0	—		0	0	16	1
Dorking Wanderers	Total		56	14	2	0	—		3	2	61	16
Havant & Waterlooville	2023–24	National League South	31	11	—		—		2 (Note: One appearance and one goal in FA Trophy, one appearance in Hampshire Senior Cup)	1	33	12
Havant & Waterlooville	2024–25	SL Premier Division South	41	35	1	1	—		6 (Note: Four appearances and four goals in FA Trophy, two appearances in Hampshire Senior Cup)	4	48	40
Havant & Waterlooville	2025–26	SL Premier Division South	39	36	1	0	—		3 (Note: One appearance in FA Trophy, two appearances and two goals in Hampshire Senior Cup)	2	43	38
Havant & Waterlooville	2026–27	SL Premier Division South	10	5	2	1	—		1	0	13	6
Havant & Waterlooville	Total		121	87	4	2	—		12	7	137	96
Career total			292	148	17	6	2	1	22	11	341	166

== Honours ==
Southampton

- U21 Premier League Cup: 2014–15
