= Harrison Reed (footballer) =

English footballer (born 1995)

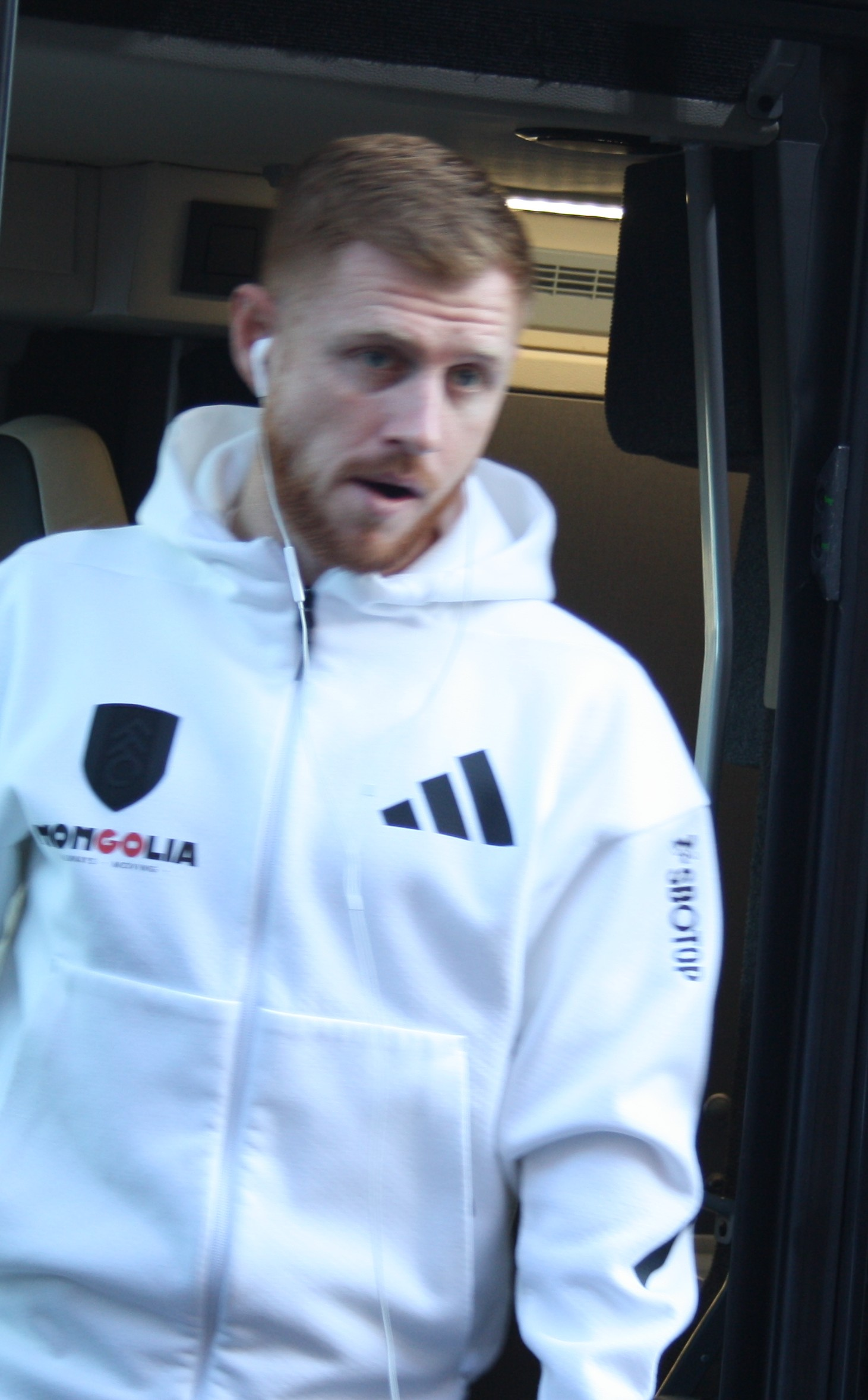
- Reed with Fulham in 2026

Personal information
- Full name: Harrison James Reed
- Date of birth: 27 January 1995 (age 31)
- Place of birth: Worthing, England
- Height: 1.76 m (5 ft 9 in)
- Position: Defensive midfielder

Team information
- Current team: Fulham
- Number: 6

Youth career
- –2013: Southampton

Senior career*
Years	Team	Apps	(Gls)
2013–2020	Southampton	17	(0)
2017–2018	→ Norwich City (loan)	39	(1)
2018–2019	→ Blackburn Rovers (loan)	33	(3)
2019–2020	→ Fulham (loan)	25	(0)
2020–	Fulham	153	(4)

International career
2014	England U19	3	(0)
2014–2015	England U20	13	(0)
- * Club domestic league appearances and goals as of 19:22, 2 May 2026 (UTC)

Harrison James Reed (born 27 January 1995) is an English professional footballer who plays as a defensive midfielder for Premier League club Fulham.

Reed is a product of the Southampton academy and made his professional debut for the club in August 2013. He had loan spells with Norwich City, Blackburn Rovers, and Fulham before joining the latter club permanently in August 2019. Reed has represented his country at youth levels.

== Club career ==
=== Southampton ===
Reed made his professional debut for Southampton on 27 August 2013 against Barnsley at Oakwell in which he came on in the 81st minute for Jay Rodriguez as Southampton secured a 5–1 victory in the second round of the League Cup. On 7 December 2013, he made his Premier League debut for Southampton against Manchester City at St Mary's Stadium, replacing Steven Davis in the final minute of a 1–1 draw. He made his first Premier League start on 20 December 2014, in a 3–0 victory over Everton, playing the full 90 minutes.

Reed made 30 first team appearances for the club, including playing in Europa League games against Vitesse Arnhem.

==== Loan to Norwich City ====
On 5 July 2017, Reed joined Norwich City on a season-long loan deal. He made his debut for the club on 5 August 2017, in a 1–1 draw against Fulham at Craven Cottage. He scored his first career goal in a 2–0 win against Queens Park Rangers on 16 August 2017.

Reed was a regular fixture, starting 36 league games for the club.

==== Loan to Blackburn Rovers ====
On 27 August 2018, Reed joined Blackburn Rovers on a season-long loan. He made his debut in a 1–1 draw against Aston Villa on 15 September 2018. He bagged his first goal for the club in a 3–2 win against Stoke City on 22 September.

He made 33 appearances for the club, scoring three goals.

=== Fulham ===
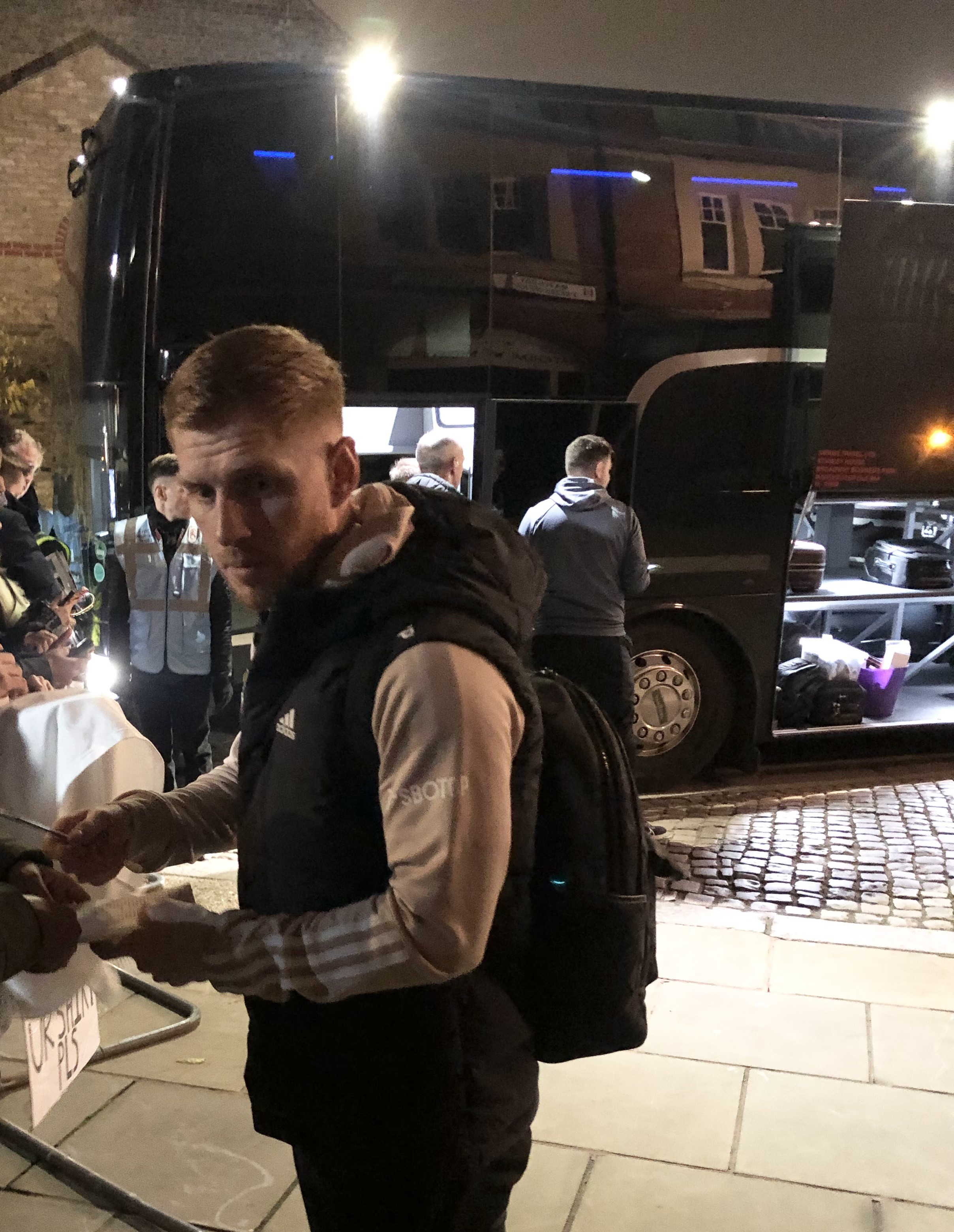
Reed signing autographs in 2023

On 8 August 2019, Reed was loaned out to Fulham for the 2019–20 season, and helped the team to promotion from the Championship. He made his debut in a 2–0 win against his former side Blackburn Rovers on 10 August 2019.

On 30 August 2020, Reed joined Fulham on a permanent basis for an undisclosed fee until the summer of 2024, with an option to extend by a further year. The transfer fee was reported to be £6million. On 16 September 2022, Reed scored his first goal for Fulham in a 3–2 victory over Nottingham Forest at the City Ground. This was Fulham's first away victory of the season.

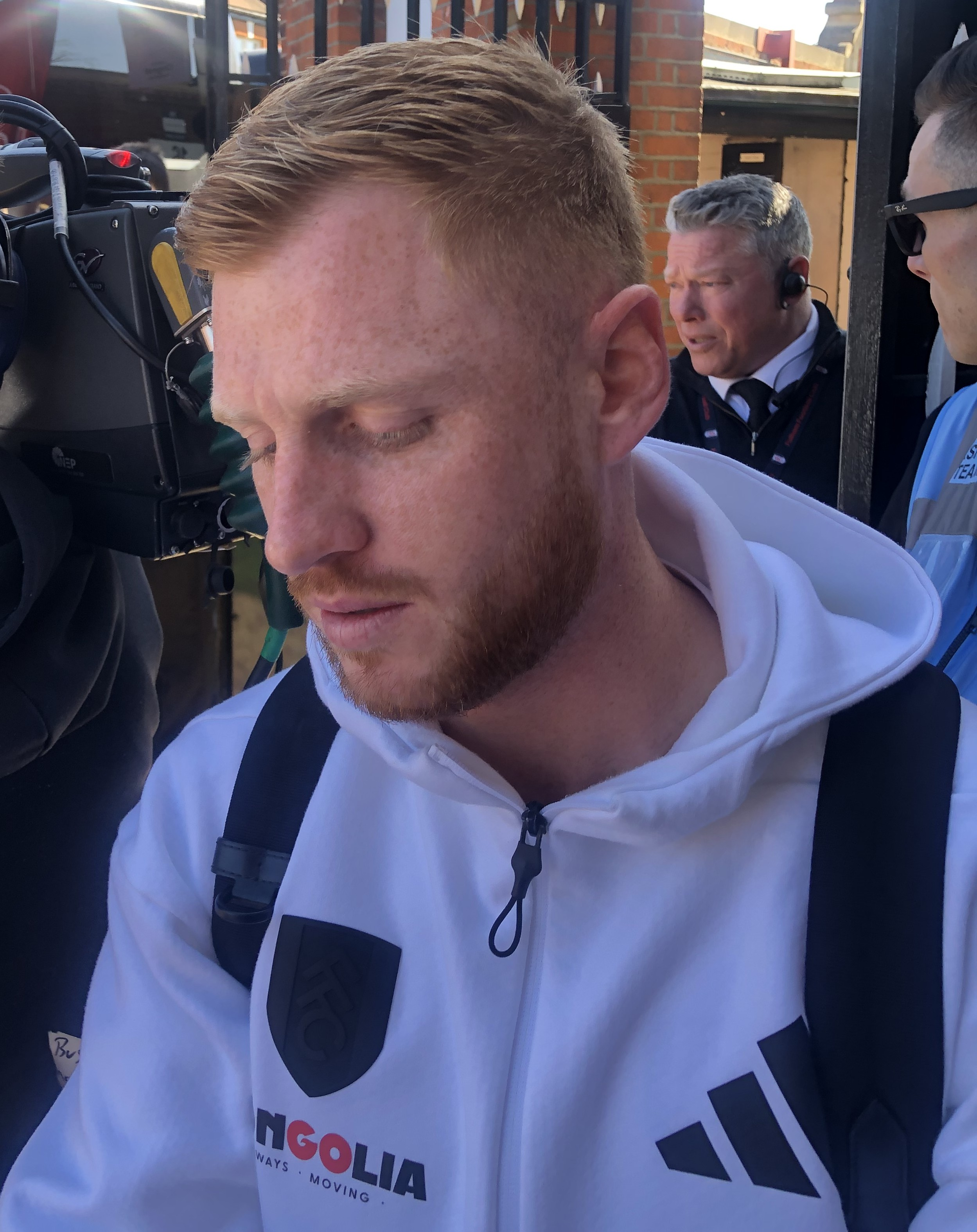
Reed in 2025

On 4 January 2026, Reed scored in stoppage time from approximately 25 yards from goal to secure a 2–2 draw against Liverpool, his first goal since April 2023, and the goal that won the Premier League Goal of the Season award.

== Career statistics ==
As of match played 15 September 2026

Appearances and goals by club, season and competition
Club	Season	League			FA Cup		League Cup		Other		Total	
Club	Season	Division	Apps	Goals	Apps	Goals	Apps	Goals	Apps	Goals	Apps	Goals
Southampton	2013–14	Premier League	4	0	1	0	3	0	—		8	0
Southampton	2014–15	Premier League	9	0	1	0	0	0	—		10	0
Southampton	2015–16	Premier League	1	0	0	0	0	0	2 (Note: Appearances in UEFA Europa League)	0	3	0
Southampton	2016–17	Premier League	3	0	3	0	3	0	—		9	0
Southampton	Total		17	0	5	0	6	0	2	0	30	0
Norwich City (loan)	2017–18	Championship	39	1	1	0	3	0	—		43	1
Blackburn Rovers (loan)	2018–19	Championship	33	3	2	0	1	0	—		36	3
Fulham (loan)	2019–20	Championship	25	0	0	0	0	0	3 (Note: Appearances in Championship play-offs)	0	28	0
Fulham	2020–21	Premier League	31	0	1	0	1	0	—		33	0
Fulham	2021–22	Championship	39	0	2	0	1	0	—		42	0
Fulham	2022–23	Premier League	37	3	5	0	0	0	—		42	3
Fulham	2023–24	Premier League	27	0	2	0	5	0	—		34	0
Fulham	2024–25	Premier League	12	0	3	0	2	0	—		17	0
Fulham	2025–26	Premier League	7	1	3	1	4	0	—		14	2
Fulham	2026–27	Premier League	0	0	0	0	2	0	—		2	0
Fulham	Total		153	4	16	1	15	0	—		184	5
Career total			267	7	24	1	25	0	5	0	321	9

== Honours ==
Southampton

- U21 Premier League Cup: 2014–15

Fulham

- EFL Championship: 2021–22; play-offs: 2020

Individual

- Premier League Goal of the Month: January 2026
- Premier League Goal of the Season: 2025–26
- BBC Goal of the Month: January 2026
