= Ryan Bertrand =

English footballer (born 1989)

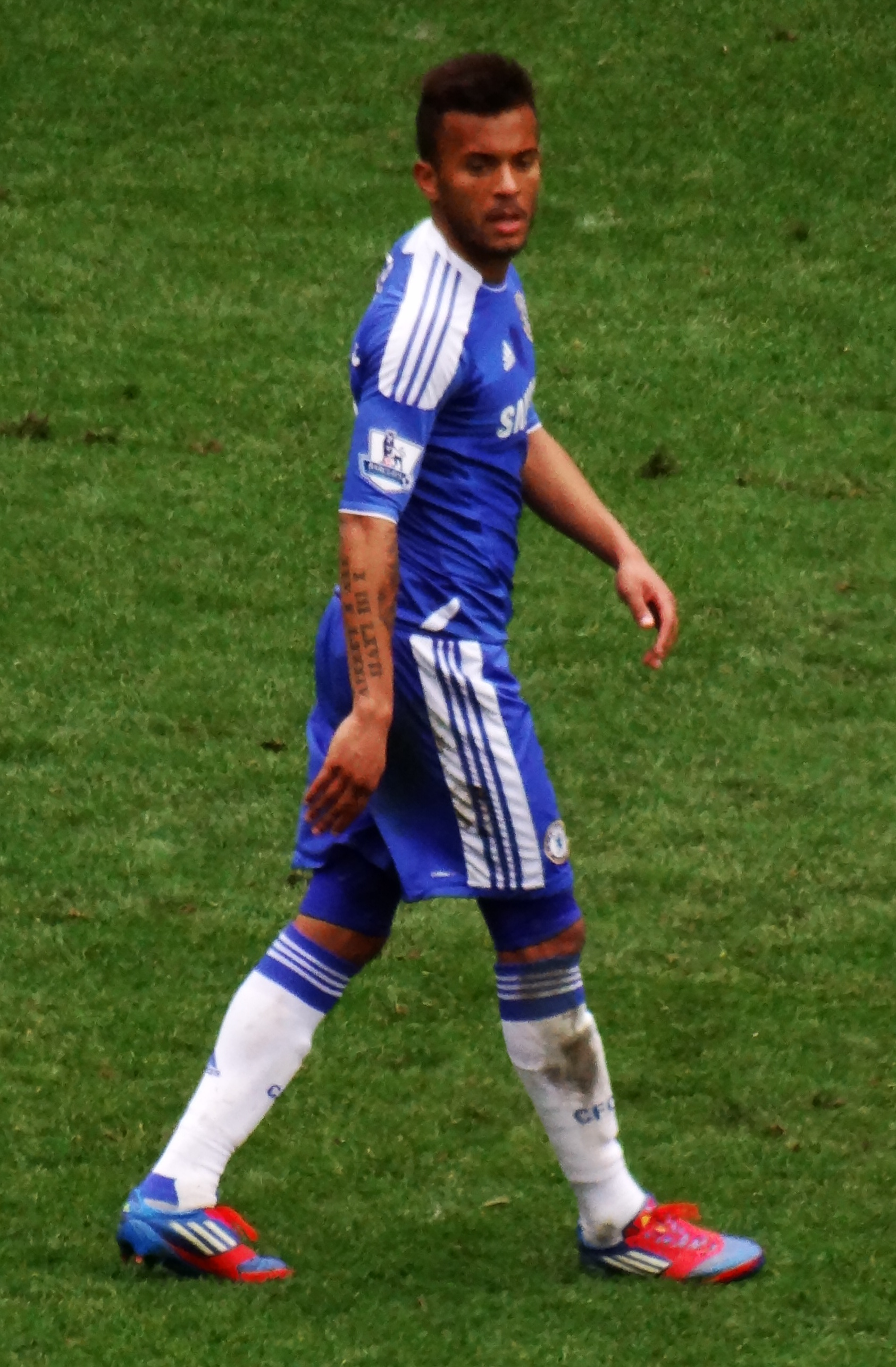
- Bertrand playing for Chelsea in 2012

Personal information
- Full name: Ryan Dominic Bertrand
- Date of birth: 5 August 1989 (age 37)
- Place of birth: Southwark, England
- Height: 5 ft 10 in (1.79 m)
- Position: Left-back

Youth career
- 1998–2005: Gillingham
- 2005–2006: Chelsea

Senior career*
Years	Team	Apps	(Gls)
2006–2015	Chelsea	28	(0)
2006	→ Bournemouth (loan)	4	(0)
2007	→ Bournemouth (loan)	1	(0)
2007–2008	→ Oldham Athletic (loan)	21	(0)
2008	→ Norwich City (loan)	18	(0)
2008–2009	→ Norwich City (loan)	38	(0)
2009–2010	→ Reading (loan)	44	(1)
2010–2011	→ Nottingham Forest (loan)	19	(0)
2014	→ Aston Villa (loan)	16	(0)
2014–2015	→ Southampton (loan)	22	(2)
2015–2021	Southampton	192	(5)
2021–2023	Leicester City	4	(0)
Total		407	(8)

International career
2006	England U17	3	(0)
2006	England U18	1	(0)
2006–2008	England U19	10	(0)
2009	England U20	1	(0)
2008–2011	England U21	16	(0)
2012	Great Britain Olympic	4	(0)
2012–2017	England	19	(1)
- * Club domestic league appearances and goals

Ryan Dominic Bertrand (born 5 August 1989) is an English former professional footballer who played as a left-back.

Bertrand began his youth career at Gillingham, before signing for Chelsea in July 2005. He graduated from Chelsea's youth system and was sent on loan to various clubs between 2006 and 2010. He made his full debut for Chelsea on in April 2011, six years after joining them, in a fixture against Birmingham City. In the 2011–12 season, Bertrand signed a new four-year contract with Chelsea and was made understudy to Ashley Cole. In May 2012, Bertrand became the first player to make his Champions League debut in the final, starting in an unfamiliar left wing role in front of Cole; Chelsea beat Bayern Munich 4–3 on penalties.

After going on loan to Southampton in the 2014–15 season, Bertrand signed permanently for them in 2015. During seven seasons with the club, he appeared 240 times. In 2021, he moved to Leicester City where he played infrequently during his two seasons with the club.

Bertrand is an England international, having also represented 'the Young Lions' at under-17, under-18, under-19, under-20, under-21 levels, as well as Great Britain at the 2012 Summer Olympics. He made his debut for the England senior team in August 2012 in a friendly against Italy, in a 2–1 win.

== Early life ==
Bertrand was born in Southwark, London. He joined Gillingham aged nine, progressing through their youth system. Bertrand attended The Robert Napier School in Gillingham, Kent. He is of Dominican and Irish descent.

== Club career ==
=== Chelsea ===
Bertrand was signed by Chelsea in July 2005 from Gillingham for an initial £125,000, which was set by a tribunal and was subject to increases depending on progress.

==== Loan spells ====
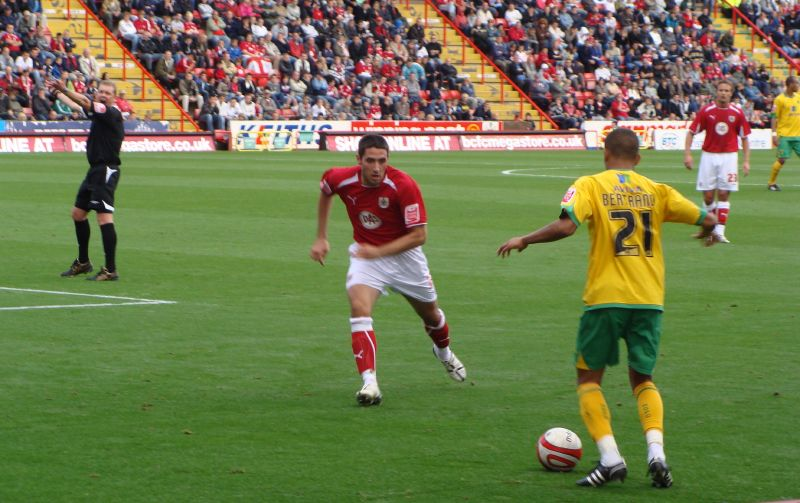
Bertrand (right) playing for Norwich City in 2008

During the 2006–07 season, he was twice sent on loan to Bournemouth, at the same time as Chelsea teammate Jack Cork. He suffered a ruptured spleen in a youth team match against Arsenal that ruled him out of the later part of that season.

In August 2007, Bertrand joined Oldham Athletic on loan until January 2008.

On 4 January 2008, a matter of days after his spell at Oldham came to an end, Bertrand joined Norwich City on loan for the rest of the 2007–08 season. He put in a number of impressive displays playing at both left-back and on the left wing, and admitted he would welcome a longer stay with the club. Bertrand became popular with the Carrow Road crowd earning him the nickname 'Plastic' in reference to the Belgian singer Plastic Bertrand. On 4 July 2008, he rejoined the club on loan until January 2009, with an option to extend to the end of the season.

On 17 July 2009, Bertrand joined Reading on a season-long loan. He scored his first professional goal against Derby County on 10 March 2010. He came third in the voting for Reading's player of the season, behind Gylfi Sigurðsson and Jimmy Kébé.

On 5 August 2010, Bertrand signed on loan with Championship club Nottingham Forest in an initial six-month deal. He made his debut for Forest as a substitute in a 1–0 away defeat against Burnley. He was a regular for Forest for whom he made a total of 19 appearances. Forest were interested in either extending Bertrand's loan spell for the rest of the season or to sign him permanently but when his loan period expired on 3 January 2011 he returned to his parent club Chelsea.

=== Return to Chelsea ===
==== 2010–11 season ====
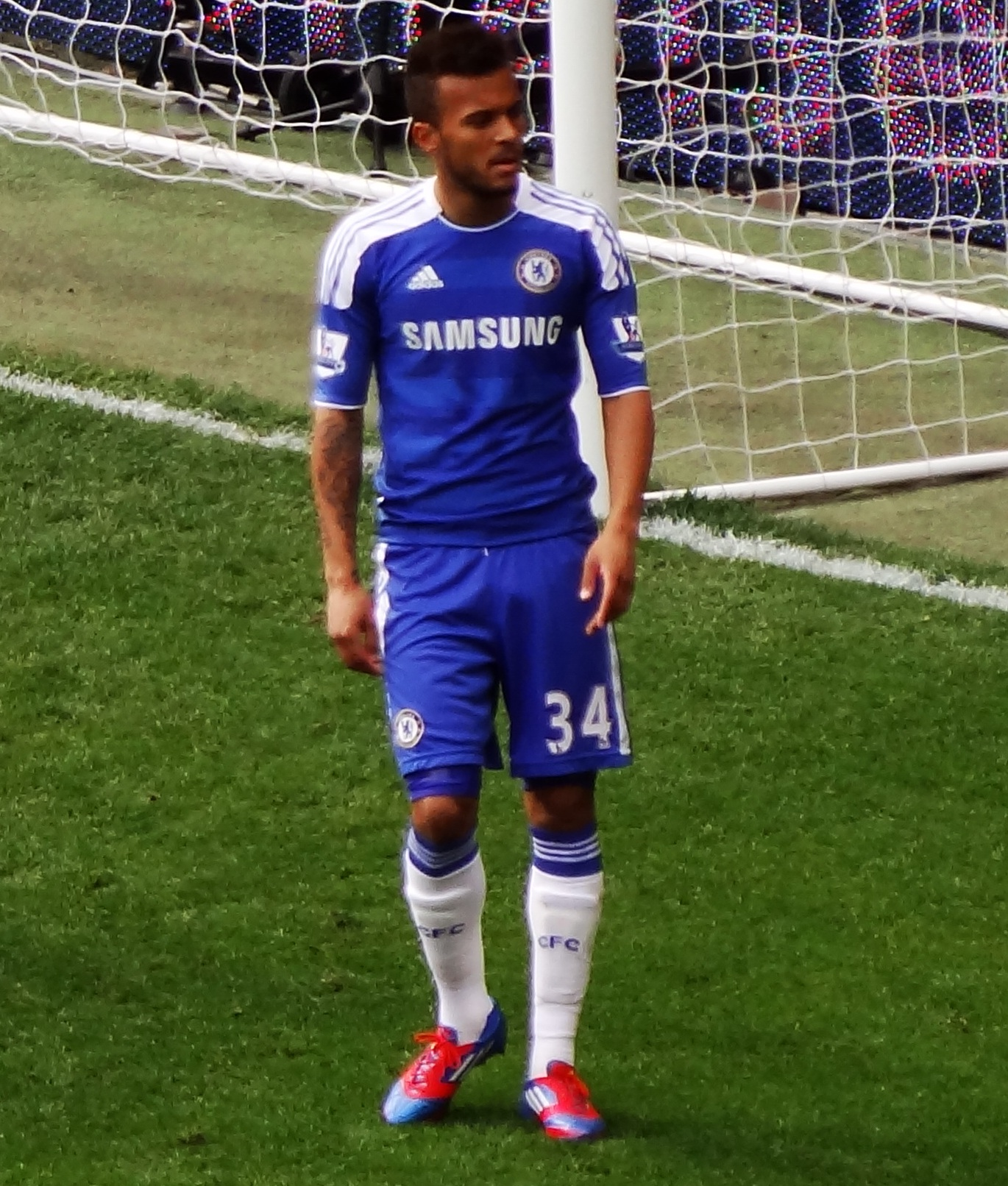
Bertrand playing for Chelsea in 2012

Bertrand made his Premier League debut on 20 April 2011, when he came on as substitute to replace Ashley Cole in a 3–1 win against Birmingham City. Bertrand also made a goal, providing a cross which Florent Malouda headed past Birmingham goalkeeper Ben Foster.

On 15 July 2011, Bertrand signed a new four-year contract with Chelsea.

He was used as a back-up to Cole by Chelsea manager Carlo Ancelotti, as he remained with Chelsea and left-back Patrick van Aanholt went out on loan. Six years after signing for Chelsea as a schoolboy, Bertrand made his first starting appearance, against Fulham in the League Cup. The match finished in favour of Chelsea, who won on penalties 4–3, as the match ended goalless.

==== 2011–12 season ====
During the 2011–12 season, Bertrand played 90 minutes in Chelsea's 2–0 defeat against Liverpool in the League Cup. He made his first league appearance of the season coming on as a late substitute for Ashley Cole against Everton, the match ended in a 2–0 defeat for Chelsea. Bertrand was handed his first Premier League start against Wigan Athletic on 7 April, in which he produced an outstanding performance, as Chelsea won 2–1 and he was named fan's man of the match. He was again named man of the match in his third start, a 0–0 draw with Arsenal on 21 April. On 5 May, Bertrand won the FA Cup with Chelsea, but he did not appear on the pitch in the win against Liverpool.

Bertrand made his European debut in the 2012 UEFA Champions League Final against Bayern Munich on 19 May 2012, playing on the left of midfield, becoming the first player in the Champions League era to make his debut in the final. He was substituted with a knock after 70 minutes and replaced by Florent Malouda as Chelsea edged out Bayern 4–3 on penalties.

==== 2012–13 season ====
Bertrand scored his first professional goal for Chelsea in the Community Shield match against Manchester City on 12 August 2012, which they went on to lose 3–2. He started in the first league match of the season against Wigan Athletic playing as a winger. On 5 September 2012, Bertrand signed a new improved five-year contract with Chelsea. On 25 September, he scored his second professional goal in a League Cup match against Wolverhampton Wanderers at Stamford Bridge, which Chelsea won 6–0.

On 1 April 2013, he came on as a replacement for Ashley Cole in the FA Cup quarter-final replay against Manchester United, which Chelsea went on to win 1–0. It was revealed after the match that Cole would be sidelined for at least two weeks, leaving Bertrand as the clubs only recognised left-back. He started the next match, the Europa League quarter-final first leg against Rubin Kazan at Stamford Bridge, putting in a strong performance as Chelsea ran out 3–1 winners. On 7 April, Bertrand made his 50th Chelsea appearance in a 2–1 win against Sunderland.

He started at left-back in the FA Cup semi-final against Manchester City at Wembley Stadium on 14 April, which ended in a 2–1 defeat for Chelsea. In the continued absence of Ashley Cole, Bertrand started and performed well in the next league match in the West London derby against Fulham at Craven Cottage on 17 April, which Chelsea comfortably won 3–0 thanks to a 30-yard strike from David Luiz and a brace from John Terry.

==== Aston Villa (loan) ====
On 17 January 2014, Bertrand joined Aston Villa on loan for the remainder of the 2013–14 season. He made his debut the next day in a 2–2 draw with Liverpool.

=== Southampton ===
On 30 July 2014, Bertrand joined Southampton on loan for the 2014–15 season. He made his competitive debut for the club on 17 August in their first match of the league season, playing the full 90 minutes of a 2–1 defeat away to Liverpool. Bertrand scored for Southampton the first time on 27 September, opening a 2–1 home win against Queens Park Rangers. His second goal for the club came on 26 December, in a 3–1 victory over Crystal Palace. On 1 February 2015, he was given a straight red card at the end of a 1–0 home loss against Swansea City for a foul on Modou Barrow.

On 2 February 2015, Bertrand completed a permanent move to Southampton, signing a 4 1/2-year deal for an undisclosed fee, reported to be £10 million. On 26 April, he was the only Southampton player named in the PFA Team of the Year.

Bertrand scored his only goal of the 2015–16 season in the final match, a penalty in a 4–1 win over Crystal Palace. On 12 July 2016, Bertrand signed a new five-year contract.

On 12 May 2021, Southampton announced that Bertrand would leave the club when his contract expired in the summer.

=== Leicester City ===
On 15 July 2021, Bertrand joined Premier League club Leicester City on a free transfer, signing a two-year contract. Bertrand made his debut for the club in Leicester's 1–0 triumph over reigning Premier League champions Manchester City in the Community Shield on 7 August 2021.

On 5 June 2023, following the club's relegation from the Premier League, it was announced that Bertrand would be leaving the club upon the expiration of his contract at the end of the month.

Bertrand announced his retirement from professional football on 18 June 2024.

== International career ==
=== England youth ===
Bertrand has represented England youth teams at under-17, under-18, under-19, under-20 and under-21 levels.

He was part of the U19 squad at the 2008 European Championship.

He was promoted to the U21s and called up for several 2009 European Championship qualifiers, but missed out of the squad for the final tournament. On 14 November, Stuart Pearce selected him at left-back for an under-21 match against Portugal at Wembley in Group 9 of the qualification process, and helped the team keep first clean sheet since 29 June 2009. He was named in the England under-21 squad for the 2011 European Championship and played all matches.

=== Great Britain Olympic ===
On 2 July 2012, Bertrand was named in Stuart Pearce's 18-man squad for the 2012 Summer Olympics. He played his first match for Great Britain on 20 July 2012 in a friendly match against Brazil. He played three matches during the Olympic tournament.

=== Senior team ===
On 10 August 2012, Bertrand was called up to the senior England team for the first time, for a friendly match against Italy. He made his international debut coming on for Leighton Baines in the 78th minute and cleared a shot off the line minutes later from Manolo Gabbiadini which eventually led to England's winning goal as England won the match 2–1.

On 11 September 2012, Bertrand came on after 73 minutes in the 2014 FIFA World Cup qualification match against Ukraine and crossed the ball that led to the penalty that Frank Lampard converted. On 8 October 2012, Bertrand was called up to the England squad for two more qualifying matches, against San Marino and Poland. However he missed both matches because of a virus.

Bertrand came on as a substitute for England away to Italy on 3 March 2015 and he won his fourth full cap, starting for England against Republic of Ireland in Dublin on 7 June 2015.

Bertrand was part of the squad for UEFA Euro 2016. On 1 September 2017, Bertrand scored his first goal for England in a 4–0 World Cup qualifier win over Malta.

== Style of play ==
Bertrand has been described as a modern-day full-back who gives assistance in attacking down the flanks, keeping and retaining possession as well as defending and reclaiming possession, making quick runs into the box and often does one-two's with his teammates. Bertrand was described by Glenn Roeder, his manager at Norwich, as a defender who "likes to bomb forward and is tenacious in the tackle when defending." In a 2018 ESPN FC article about the state of left-backs in England, Michael Cox said that the "only real star is Ryan Bertrand, a truly excellent full-back defensively and offensively".

== Business ventures ==
Bertrand is a founder of the fintech brokerage Silicon Markets which provides machine learning and algorithmic trading tools for retail traders in the Foreign Exchange and CFD markets.

== Personal life ==
Bertrand's son, Marcell Washington, joined the youth academy of Arsenal on 12 June 2025.

== Career statistics ==
=== Club ===
Appearances and goals by club, season and competition
Club	Season	League			FA Cup		League Cup		Europe		Other		Total	
Club	Season	Division	Apps	Goals	Apps	Goals	Apps	Goals	Apps	Goals	Apps	Goals	Apps	Goals
Chelsea	2006–07	Premier League	0	0	—		0	0	0	0	0	0	0	0
Chelsea	2007–08	Premier League	0	0	—		—		0	0	0	0	0	0
Chelsea	2010–11	Premier League	1	0	0	0	—		0	0	—		1	0
Chelsea	2011–12	Premier League	7	0	4	0	3	0	1 (Note: Appearance(s) in UEFA Champions League)	0	—		15	0
Chelsea	2012–13	Premier League	19	0	5	0	4	1	8 (Note: Three appearances in UEFA Champions League, five appearances in UEFA Europa League)	0	2 (Note: One appearance and one goal in FA Community Shield, one appearance in UEFA Super Cup)	1	38	2
Chelsea	2013–14	Premier League	1	0	0	0	2	0	0	0	0	0	3	0
Chelsea	Total		28	0	9	0	9	1	9	0	2	1	57	2
Bournemouth (loan)	2006–07	League One	5	0	2	0	—		—		—		7	0
Oldham Athletic (loan)	2007–08	League One	21	0	—		1	0	—		2 (Note: Appearance(s) in Football League Trophy)	0	24	0
Norwich City (loan)	2007–08	Championship	18	0	2	0	—		—		—		20	0
Norwich City (loan)	2008–09	Championship	38	0	2	0	0	0	—		—		40	0
Norwich City (loan)	Total		56	0	4	0	0	0	—		—		60	0
Reading (loan)	2009–10	Championship	44	1	6	0	1	0	—		—		51	1
Nottingham Forest (loan)	2010–11	Championship	19	0	—		—		—		—		19	0
Aston Villa (loan)	2013–14	Premier League	16	0	—		—		—		—		16	0
Southampton	2014–15	Premier League	34	2	3	0	2	0	—		—		39	2
Southampton	2015–16	Premier League	32	1	0	0	2	0	0	0	—		34	1
Southampton	2016–17	Premier League	28	2	1	0	4	1	1 (Note: Appearance(s) in UEFA Europa League)	0	—		34	3
Southampton	2017–18	Premier League	35	0	5	0	0	0	—		—		40	0
Southampton	2018–19	Premier League	24	1	0	0	0	0	—		—		24	1
Southampton	2019–20	Premier League	32	1	2	0	1	0	—		—		35	1
Southampton	2020–21	Premier League	29	0	4	0	1	0	—		—		34	0
Southampton	Total		214	7	15	0	10	1	1	0	—		240	8
Leicester City	2021–22	Premier League	4	0	0	0	2	0	4	0	1 (Note: Appearance in FA Community Shield)	0	11	0
Leicester City	2022–23	Premier League	0	0	0	0	0	0	—		—		0	0
Leicester City	Total		4	0	0	0	2	0	4	0	1	0	11	0
Career total			407	8	36	0	23	2	14	0	5	1	485	11

=== International ===
Appearances and goals by national team and year
National team	Year	Apps	Goals
England	2012	2	0
England	2013	0	0
England	2014	0	0
England	2015	5	0
England	2016	3	0
England	2017	9	1
Total		19	1

England score listed first, score column indicates score after each Bertrand goal.

List of international goals scored by Ryan Bertrand
No.	Date	Venue	Cap	Opponent	Score	Result	Competition	Ref.
1	1 September 2017	National Stadium, Ta' Qali, Malta	15	Malta	2–0	4–0	2018 FIFA World Cup qualification	

== Honours ==
Chelsea

- FA Cup: 2011–12
- UEFA Champions League: 2011–12
- UEFA Europa League: 2012–13

Southampton

- EFL Cup runner-up: 2016–17

Leicester City

- FA Community Shield: 2021

Individual

- PFA Team of the Year: 2014–15 Premier League
