= Jake Sinclair (footballer) =

English footballer

Personal information
- Full name: Jake Tony Sinclair
- Date of birth: 29 November 1994 (age 31)
- Place of birth: Bath, England
- Position: Forward

Team information
- Current team: Mangotsfield United

Youth career
- 2003–2013: Southampton

Senior career*
Years	Team	Apps	(Gls)
2013–2015	Southampton	0	(0)
2014–2015	→ Hibernian (loan)	3	(0)
2015–2016	Frome Town	4	(4)
2016–2017	Hereford		
2017	Frome Town		
2017–	Mangotsfield United		
- * Club domestic league appearances and goals as of 15:12, 1 January 2016 (UTC)

Jake Tony Sinclair (born 29 November 1994) is an English footballer who plays as a forward for Mangotsfield United. He has played professionally for Southampton and Hibernian.

== Career ==
Sinclair joined Southampton at the academy level at the age of eight years. He made his professional debut for Southampton's first-team on 27 August 2013 against Barnsley at Oakwell Stadium in the Football League Cup in which he came on in the 90th minute for Emmanuel Mayuka as Southampton won the match 5–1.

On 1 September 2014, Sinclair joined Scottish Championship club Hibernian on a season-long loan. He returned to Southampton on 12 January.

On 30 June 2015, Southampton opted against offering Sinclair a new contract and therefore he was released with five other players.

On 7 December 2015, Sinclair joined Southern Premier League side Frome Town. Five days later, he made his debut in the 60th minute of a 1–0 defeat to King's Lynn Town.

On 29 August 2016, Sinclair joined Hereford. On 12 May 2017, it was announced that he would leave upon the expiry of his contract.

== Personal life ==
Jake Sinclair is the younger brother of former Celtic player Scott Sinclair and also the brother of Martin Sinclair, a British Paralympic 7-a-side player.

== Honours ==
Southampton

- U21 Premier League Cup: 2014–15
