= 2016–17 Southampton F.C. season =

Southampton F.C.
2016–17 season
- Chairman: Ralph Krueger
- Manager: Claude Puel
- Stadium: St Mary's Stadium
- Premier League: 8th
- FA Cup: Fourth round
- EFL Cup: Runners-up
- UEFA Europa League: Group stage
- Top goalscorer: League: Nathan Redmond (7); All: Charlie Austin (9)
- Highest home attendance: 31,891 v West Ham United (4 February 2017)
- Lowest home attendance: 13,517 v Norwich City (18 January 2017)
- Average home league attendance: 30,936
Home colours	Away colours	Third colours

The 2016–17 Southampton F.C. season was the club's 18th season in the Premier League and their 40th in the top division of English football. In addition to the 2016–17 Premier League, the club also competed in the FA Cup, EFL Cup and UEFA Europa League. The season was the club's only campaign with manager Claude Puel, who took over from Ronald Koeman on 30 June 2016. The club finished eighth in the Premier League table, having won twelve, drawn ten and lost sixteen of their 38 matches played. They were knocked out of the UEFA Europa League at the group stage, having won two, drawn two and lost two of their matches, and the FA Cup in the fourth round, while they finished as runners-up in the EFL Cup Final losing 3–2 to Manchester United.

Following the end of the 2015–16 season, Southampton released goalkeeper Will Britt, midfielder Gastón Ramírez and defender Josh Debayo, while veteran goalkeeper Kelvin Davis retired. The club also sold striker Juanmi to Real Sociedad, midfielder Victor Wanyama to Tottenham Hotspur, winger Sadio Mané to Liverpool, striker Graziano Pellè to Shandong Luneng, defender Bevis Mugabi to Yeovil Town, and defender Jordan Turnbull to Coventry City. Goalkeeper Paulo Gazzaniga and striker Sam Gallagher were sent out on full-season loans to Rayo Vallecano and Blackburn Rovers, respectively, while defender Jason McCarthy and midfielder Dominic Gape moved to Walsall and Wycombe Wanderers, respectively, until January.

In the summer transfer window, the Saints also made a number of new signings. First, on 1 July, they bought winger Nathan Redmond from Norwich City for a fee in the region of £10 million, before Danish midfielder Pierre-Emile Højbjerg joined from Bayern Munich for a reported fee of £12.8 million ten days later. On 1 August, goalkeeper Alex McCarthy joined from Crystal Palace for an undisclosed fee, while French defender Jérémy Pied joined on a free transfer from OGC Nice on the same day. Shortly before the transfer window closed, the club signed Moroccan midfielder Sofiane Boufal from Lille for a club record fee of £16 million, as well as bringing in former Leeds United goalkeeper Stuart Taylor, who had been a free agent for over a year.

When the transfer window reopened in January 2017, Dominic Gape's loan move to Wycombe Wanderers was made permanent in a free transfer, while Jason McCarthy's loan spell at Walsall was extended until the end of the season. On 20 January, captain José Fonte left Southampton after seven years at the club, joining West Ham United for £8 million. On transfer deadline day, the club signed Tunisian goalkeeper Mouez Hassen on loan from Nice until the end of the season, as well as bringing in Italian international striker Manolo Gabbiadini from Napoli in a £14 million deal. After the window closed, the club also signed Uruguayan centre-back Martín Cáceres, who had been a free agent since leaving Juventus at the end of the previous season.

Charlie Austin finished as Southampton's top scorer for the season with nine goals in all competitions, despite having been injured between December 2016 and May 2017. New signing Nathan Redmond was the club's top scorer in the Premier League, with seven goals (eight in all competitions). Spanish midfielder Oriol Romeu won both Southampton F.C. Player of the Season awards, from the Southern Daily Echo and the club, as well as the club-run Players' Player of the Season accolade. The club's highest home attendance of the season was 31,891 against West Ham United in the Premier League on 4 February 2017 (their highest since April 2013), and their lowest attendance of the season was 13,517 against Norwich City in the FA Cup on 18 January 2017.

== Pre-season ==
Southampton began their pre-season preparations against the D.C. United Under-23s on 15 July 2016, winning 2–0 thanks to a first-half goal from James Ward-Prowse and a late penalty by Jay Rodriguez. Commencing a tour of the Netherlands the following week, the Saints beat PEC Zwolle 4–0 on 23 July, with Charlie Austin opening the scoring before new signings Nathan Redmond (twice) and Pierre-Emile Højbjerg (with a penalty) scored their first goals for the club. Four days later, the side won their third consecutive game by beating FC Twente 2–1, with defender Virgil van Dijk and striker Sam Gallagher getting on the scoresheet. The club ended their Dutch tour by extending their winning run to four with a win over FC Groningen on 30 July, the only goal scored by Austin. Upon their return to England, the Saints hosted Spanish side Espanyol on 3 August, which they drew 1–1 to end their winning run. Midfielder Oriol Romeu opened the scoring for the hosts in the first half, but Felipe Caicedo equalised for the visitors in the second half through a penalty, which was awarded for a foul in the penalty area by van Dijk on Léo Baptistão. In their final pre-season friendly, Southampton beat Athletic Bilbao 1–0 thanks to a goal from Shane Long just before half-time.

15 July 2016 Friendly	D.C. United Under-23s	0–2	Southampton	Washington, D.C., United States
11:00 EDT		Report	Ward-Prowse 16'; Rodriguez 89' (pen.)	Stadium: RFK Stadium

23 July 2016 Friendly	PEC Zwolle	0–4	Southampton	Utrecht, Netherlands
19:00 CEST		Report	Austin 14'; Redmond 44', 45+1'; Højbjerg 88' (pen.)	Stadium: USV Sportpark

27 July 2016 Friendly	Twente	1–2	Southampton	Oldenzaal, Netherlands
19:00 CEST	Bijen 74'	Report	Van Dijk 17'; Gallagher 69'	Stadium: Q20 Stadium

30 July 2016 Friendly	Groningen	0–1	Southampton	Groningen, Netherlands
15:30 CEST		Report	Austin 75'	Stadium: Euroborg

3 August 2016 Friendly	Southampton	1–1	Espanyol	Southampton
15:00 BST	Romeu 31'	Report	Caicedo 69' (pen.)	Stadium: St Mary's Stadium; Attendance: 8,984; Referee: Mike Dean

7 August 2016 Friendly	Southampton	1–0	Athletic Bilbao	Southampton
15:00 BST	Long 43'	Report		Stadium: St Mary's Stadium; Attendance: 17,758; Referee: Kevin Friend

== Premier League ==
=== August–October 2016 ===
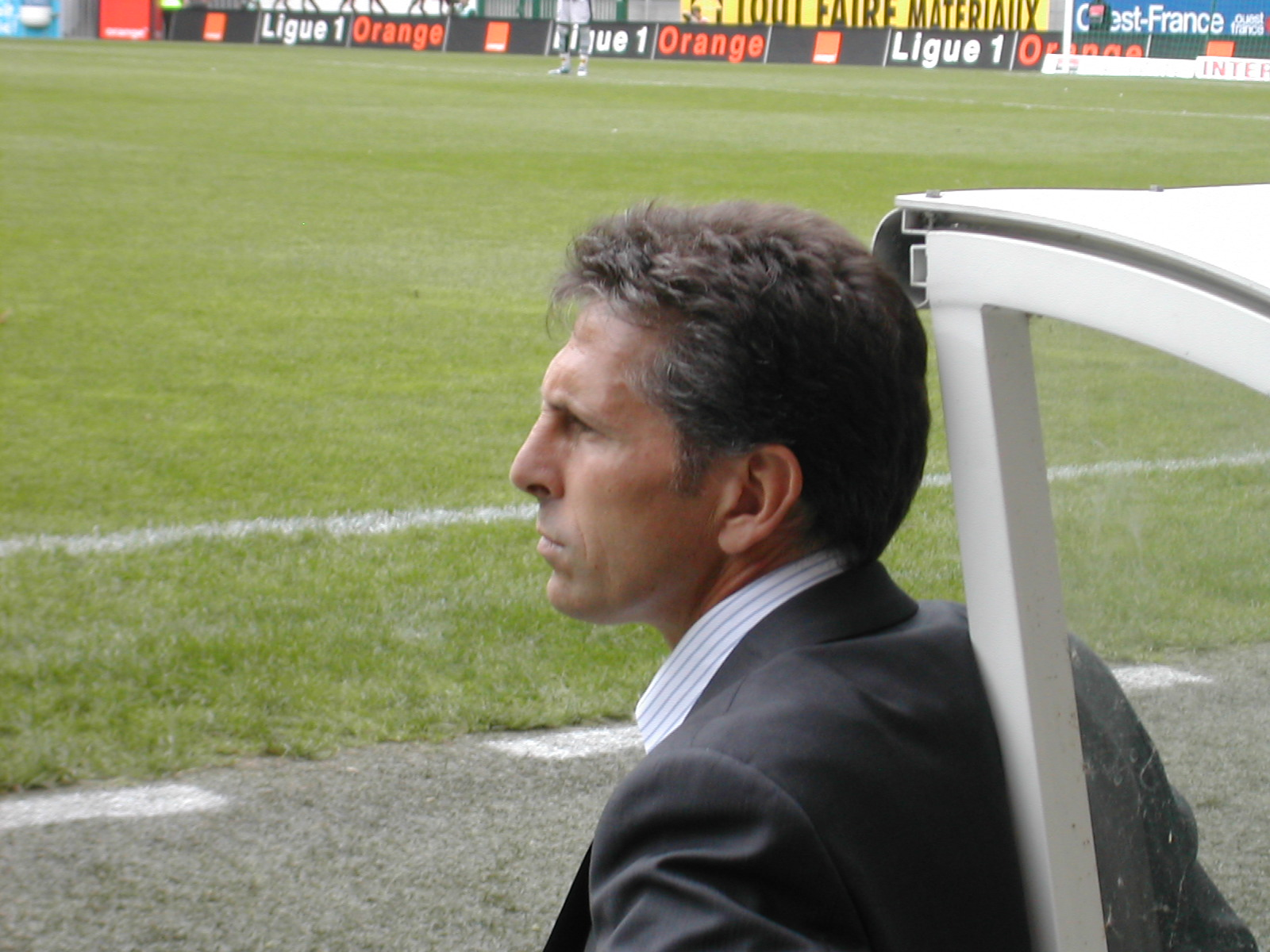
Claude Puel took over from Ronald Koeman as Southampton manager at the beginning of the 2016–17 season.

Southampton began the 2016–17 Premier League season on 13 August 2016 with a home fixture against Watford, which ended in a 1–1 draw. Watford midfielder Étienne Capoue opened the scoring for the visitors within ten minutes, before winger Nathan Redmond scored on his debut shortly after half-time to seal a point for the hosts. The following week the club travelled to Old Trafford to face Manchester United, losing 2–0 to drop to 13th in the table. Zlatan Ibrahimović opened the scoring for the hosts shortly before half-time, and later scored his second from the penalty spot after the break following a foul by Jordy Clasie on former Southampton defender Luke Shaw. On 27 August, the club drew 1–1 with Sunderland at St Mary's Stadium. The game remained goalless until late in the game, when Jermain Defoe opened the scoring with a penalty for a foul by José Fonte, before Jay Rodriguez equalised five minutes before full-time. The draw saw Southampton drop further down the table to 15th.

Following a break for international fixtures, Southampton faced Arsenal at the Emirates Stadium on 10 September, losing 2–1. The Saints opened the scoring within the first 20 minutes, when a Dušan Tadić free kick deflected off goalkeeper Petr Čech into the goal. Laurent Koscielny equalised for the hosts ten minutes later with an overhead kick, and in added time at the end of the game Santi Cazorla scored a controversial penalty to secure the win. The Saints picked up their first league win of the season the following week when they beat Swansea City by a single goal, scored by Charlie Austin. On 25 September, Southampton travelled to the London Stadium to face West Ham United, winning 3–0 to move up to the top half of the league table. The Saints dominated much of the game, with Austin opening the scoring just before half-time with his fifth goal in four games (in all competitions). Tadić scored in the 62nd minute to double the visitors' lead, before substitute James Ward-Prowse scored in injury time to make it three.

Southampton faced league champions Leicester City on 2 October in a game that ended goalless. Austin came closest to scoring in the first half, hitting the post once and heading on goal twice. The striker was also denied in the second half by Kasper Schmeichel, while Jamie Vardy saw his side's best chance blocked later on. After another international break, Southampton hosted Burnley on 16 October, winning the game 3–1. After a goalless first half, the Saints scored three goals in 15 minutes to take a commanding lead, with Austin opening the scoring after 52 minutes and Redmond scoring on 60 minutes. Austin scored a penalty six minutes later to make it three, with Sam McQueen winning the penalty on his Premier League debut, before Sam Vokes also converted from the spot for the visitors. The following week, Southampton drew 1–1 with Manchester City. Redmond opened the scoring for the Saints in the 27th minute after a mistake by City defender John Stones, although the visitors did not have many more chances to score in the first half. After the break, the home side equalised quickly through Kelechi Iheanacho, but saw a number of chances to win the game prevented by Fraser Forster in the Southampton goal. The month ended with a 2–0 loss at home to Chelsea, thanks to goals from Eden Hazard and Diego Costa.

=== November–December 2016 ===
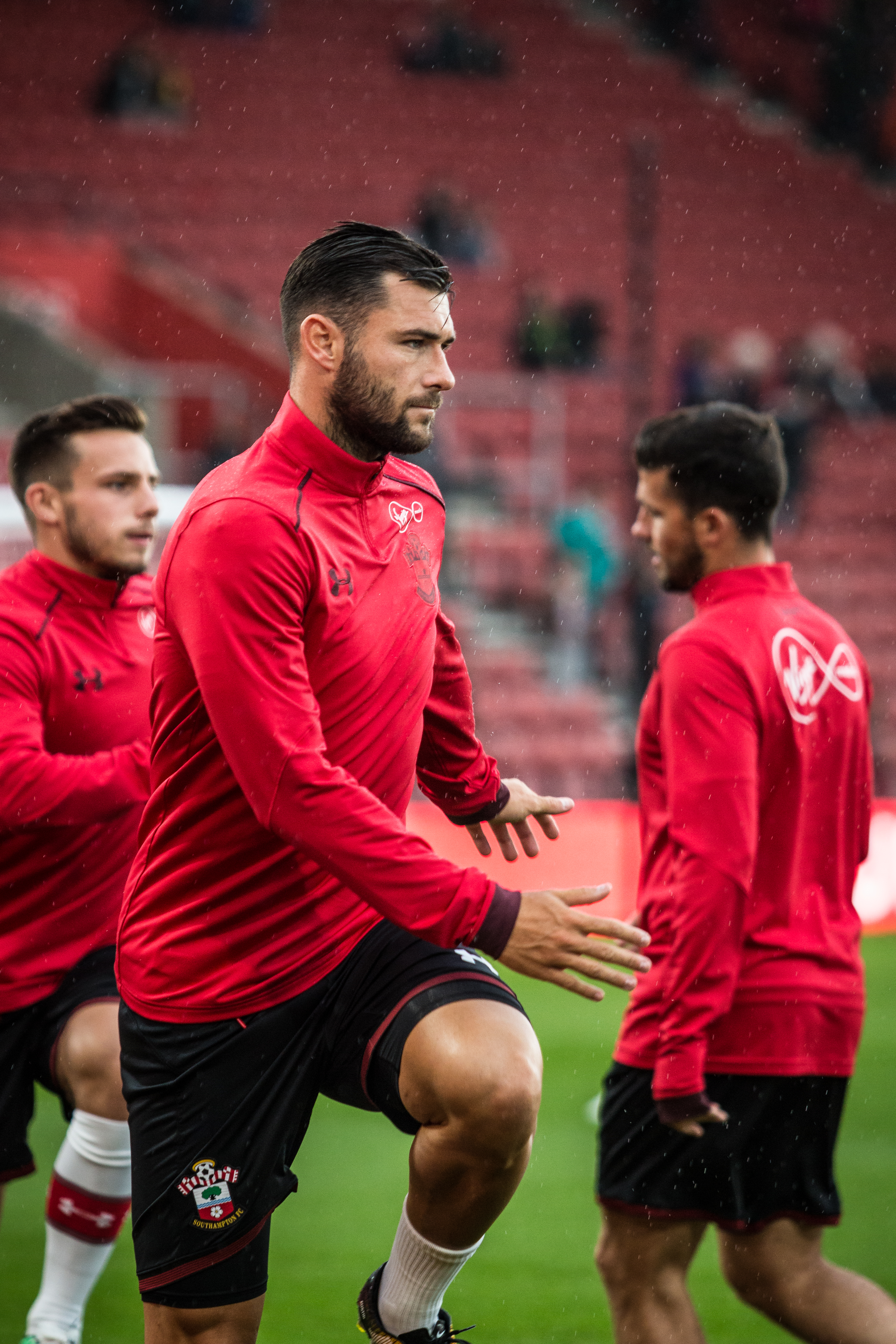
Charlie Austin scored four goals in four games between 17 September and 15 October 2016 to help Southampton move up to the top half of the table.

On 6 November, Southampton lost 2–1 at the struggling Hull City. The Saints went a goal up within six minutes, when Charlie Austin scored a penalty awarded for a foul by Curtis Davies. The visitors continued to dominate throughout the rest of the first half and into the second, although the hosts equalised through Robert Snodgrass in the 61st minute. Within two minutes, Hull went 2–1 through Michael Dawson, holding on for an unlikely win. On 19 November, the club returned from another international break to face Liverpool at St Mary's, which ended in a goalless draw. Former Saints winger Sadio Mané came close to opening the scoring for the visitors twice in the first half, before Philippe Coutinho, Roberto Firmino and Nathaniel Clyne also missed good chances later on, with the home side's defence playing strongly to keep Liverpool out. The following week, Southampton beat Everton (managed by former Saints boss Ronald Koeman) by a single early goal to return to tenth in the league table. Charlie Austin scored in the first minute to put the hosts ahead, converting a cross from debutant Josh Sims. Southampton continued to dominate possession and chances on goal throughout the match, with James Ward-Prowse coming closest to doubling his side's lead in the second half.

The Saints lost 3–0 to struggling Crystal Palace in their first game of December, dropping down a place in the league table as a result. Christian Benteke opened the scoring for the home side in the 33rd minute after a poor clearance from Fraser Forster, before James Tomkins double Palace's lead just a few minutes later from close range. The visitors enjoyed the majority of possession and chances on goal, but Benteke struck again late on to secure the victory. The following week, Southampton picked up a 1–0 win over Middlesbrough at St Mary's Stadium to move up to tenth in the league table. After a first half of relatively few chances, Sofiane Boufal broke the deadlock shortly after the break with his first Premier League goal, striking from around 25 yards out. On 14 December, Southampton and Stoke City drew 0–0 at the bet365 Stadium. The hosts were reduced to ten men early on when Marko Arnautović was sent off for a high-footed challenge, but the visitors failed to take advantage and break the deadlock. Jay Rodriguez came closest to score, but missed from close range, while a shot from James Ward-Prowse was cleared off the line later on.

On 18 December, Southampton travelled to face local rivals Bournemouth, coming from a goal behind to win 3–1 and move up to seventh in the Premier League table. Nathan Aké opened the scoring for the Cherries within six minutes, but Ryan Bertrand scored less than ten minutes later to bring the Saints level. Both sides enjoyed numerous chances to go a goal up, but it was the visitors who scored again shortly after the break, when Jay Rodriguez tapped in a chance set up by substitute Steven Davis. Southampton dominated the rest of the game, and Rodriguez scored his second of the match to seal the win late on. In their first game after Christmas, Southampton lost 4–1 to Tottenham Hotspur on 28 December. The home side opened the scoring quickly in the second minute when Virgil van Dijk headed in a free kick from James Ward-Prowse, but it was the visitors who scored next as Delle Alli scored a header from Moussa Sissoko's deflected cross. After dominating much of the rest of the first half, Spurs went ahead shortly after the break through Harry Kane, who missed a penalty a few minutes later when Alli was fouled by Nathan Redmond, who was sent off. Son Heung-min scored a third for Tottenham late on, before Alli scored his second of the game to make it four. On the final day of the year, Southampton lost at home again to West Bromwich Albion, who won 2–1. After enjoying the majority of possession in the first half, the hosts went one up through Shane Long just before half-time, although the lead was short-lived as Matt Phillips equalised just a minute later. Shortly after the break, Hal Robson-Kanu scored a second for West Brom, which was enough to secure the win as the Saints failed to equalise late on. Virgil van Dijk was sent off late on for a second bookable offence.

=== January–March 2017 ===
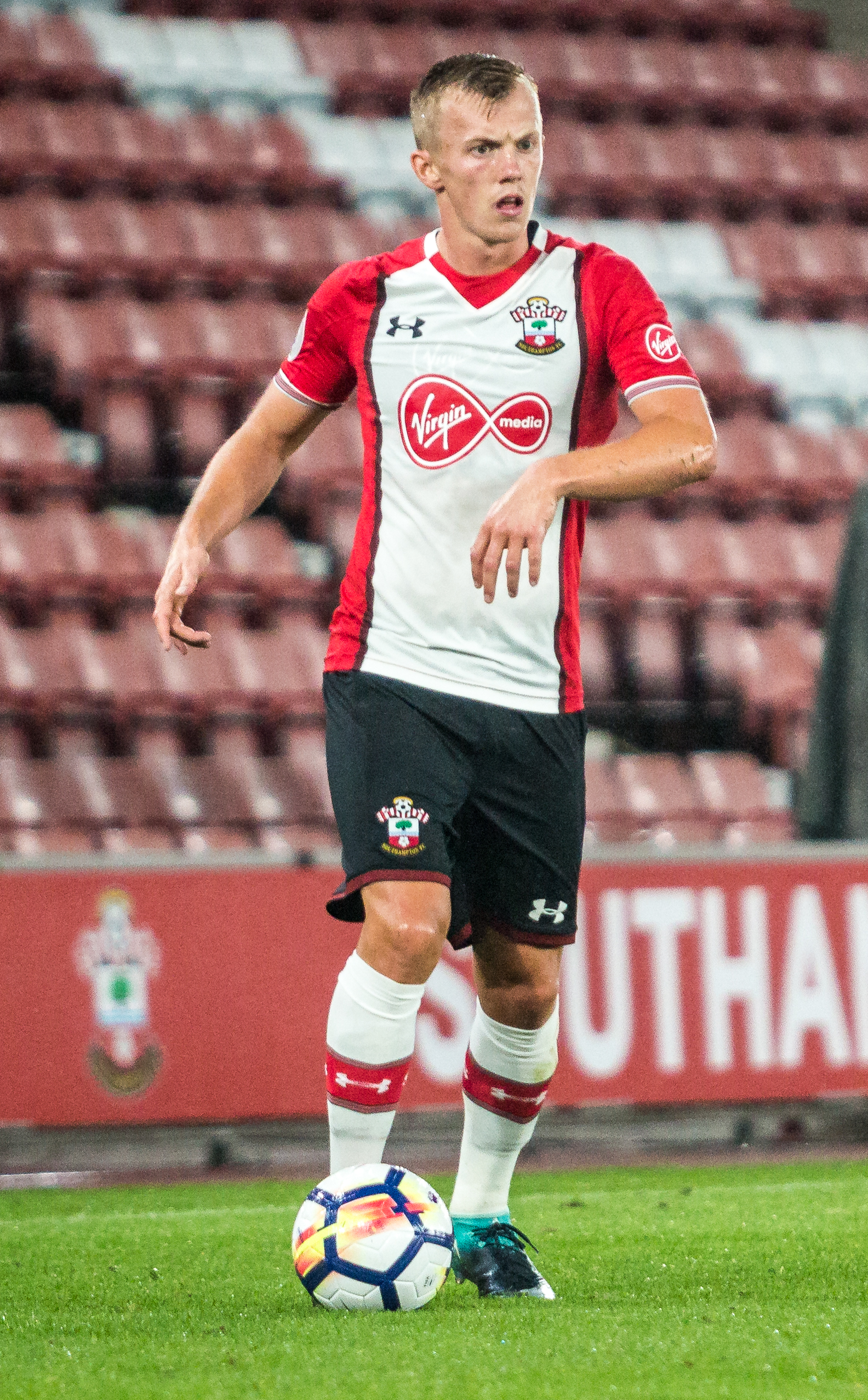
James Ward-Prowse was the first player to score for Southampton in the league in 2017, against Leicester City.

On 2 January 2017, in their third game in six days, Southampton travelled to Goodison Park to face Everton, losing the match 3–0. After much of the game lacked clear chances on goal, the home side opened the scoring after 73 minutes when Enner Valencia scored his first goal for the club. Leighton Baines scored a penalty following a foul by Maya Yoshida on Valencia less than ten minutes later, before Romelu Lukaku made it three before the end of the match. The loss saw the Saints drop to tenth in the table. Southampton lost their fourth consecutive league game on 14 January, after they were beaten 1–0 away to Burnley. The visitors came closest to opening the scoring in the first half through Dušan Tadić, whose shot was cleared off the line, and also enjoyed the majority of chances in the second period. However, it was the hosts who scored the only goal of the game through substitute Joey Barton, who scored a free kick in the 78th minute to send the Saints down to 13th in the league table.

Southampton won their first Premier League game in over a month on 22 January, beating league champions Leicester City 3–0 at home. James Ward-Prowse opened the scoring in the 26th minute with a first-time shot after a Cédric Soares cross from the right wing. The hosts continued to dominate, culminating in a second goal in the first half courtesy of Jay Rodriguez, who converted a free-kick from Ward-Prowse. Leicester enjoyed a number of chances to get back into the game later on, with Wes Morgan coming closest to scoring for the visitors, but Southampton continued to attack as an own goal by Morgan was later disallowed as Maya Yoshida was offside. Morgan was involved again as he brought down Shane Long in the box in the 85th minute, with Dušan Tadić scoring the resulting penalty kick to win the game 3–0. Southampton lost 2–1 to Swansea City the following week, dropping a place in the table as a result. After a relatively slow start, Swansea opened the scoring through Alfie Mawson in the 38th minute, going into half-time with the advantage. The Saints increased the pressure after the break, with Shane Long equalising after 57 minutes against the run of play, although Gylfi Sigurðsson scored a second for the hosts later on.

On 4 February 2017, Southampton hosted West Ham United and lost 3–1 to drop back to 13th in the league table. New signing Manolo Gabbiadini opened the scoring on his debut after 12 minutes, but the visitors equalised just two minutes later through Andy Carroll. Pedro Obiang scored a long-range effort just before the break, and later on Mark Noble made it three for the Hammers. The following week, Southampton picked up their biggest win of the season when they beat bottom-placed Sunderland 4–0. After a relatively even opening to the game, Gabbiadini opened the scoring for the Saints after half an hour with his second goal in his second game, converting a cross from Ryan Bertrand. On the stroke of half-time the recent signing doubled the visitors' lead with his third goal in two games. Shortly before full-time it was 3–0 thanks to an own goal from Jason Denayer, and in injury time Shane Long made it four to take Southampton up to 11th in the table. Wahbi Khazri scored a consolation before the end, but it was disallowed for handball.

In their first game after the 2017 EFL Cup Final, Southampton went ahead of Watford in the table when they beat the side 4–3 at Vicarage Road on 4 March 2017. The hosts went ahead within four minutes through captain Troy Deeney, but the Saints responded and equalised 24 minutes later through Dušan Tadić following some poor defending. Nathan Redmond put the visitors ahead on the stroke of half-time, after Tadić and James Ward-Prowse worked the opportunity. Southampton pushed for a third into the second half, with Manolo Gabbiadini coming closest to scoring, but the Hornets equalised through Stefano Okaka on 79 minutes. Gabbiadini scored his sixth goal for the Saints just four minutes later and Redmond scored a fourth for Southampton, with Abdoulaye Doucouré scoring a third for Watford in stoppage time. On 19 March, Southampton lost 2–1 at Tottenham Hotspur. Christian Eriksen opened the scoring within 15 minutes from the edge of the penalty area, before Dele Alli doubled the home side's lead with a 33rd-minute penalty awarded for a foul by Steven Davis. Dušan Tadić missed a close-range chance on goal before the break, before James Ward-Prowse scored just after half-time to bring the Saints back into the game. Spurs held off further Saints attacks for the 2–1 win.

=== April–May 2017 ===
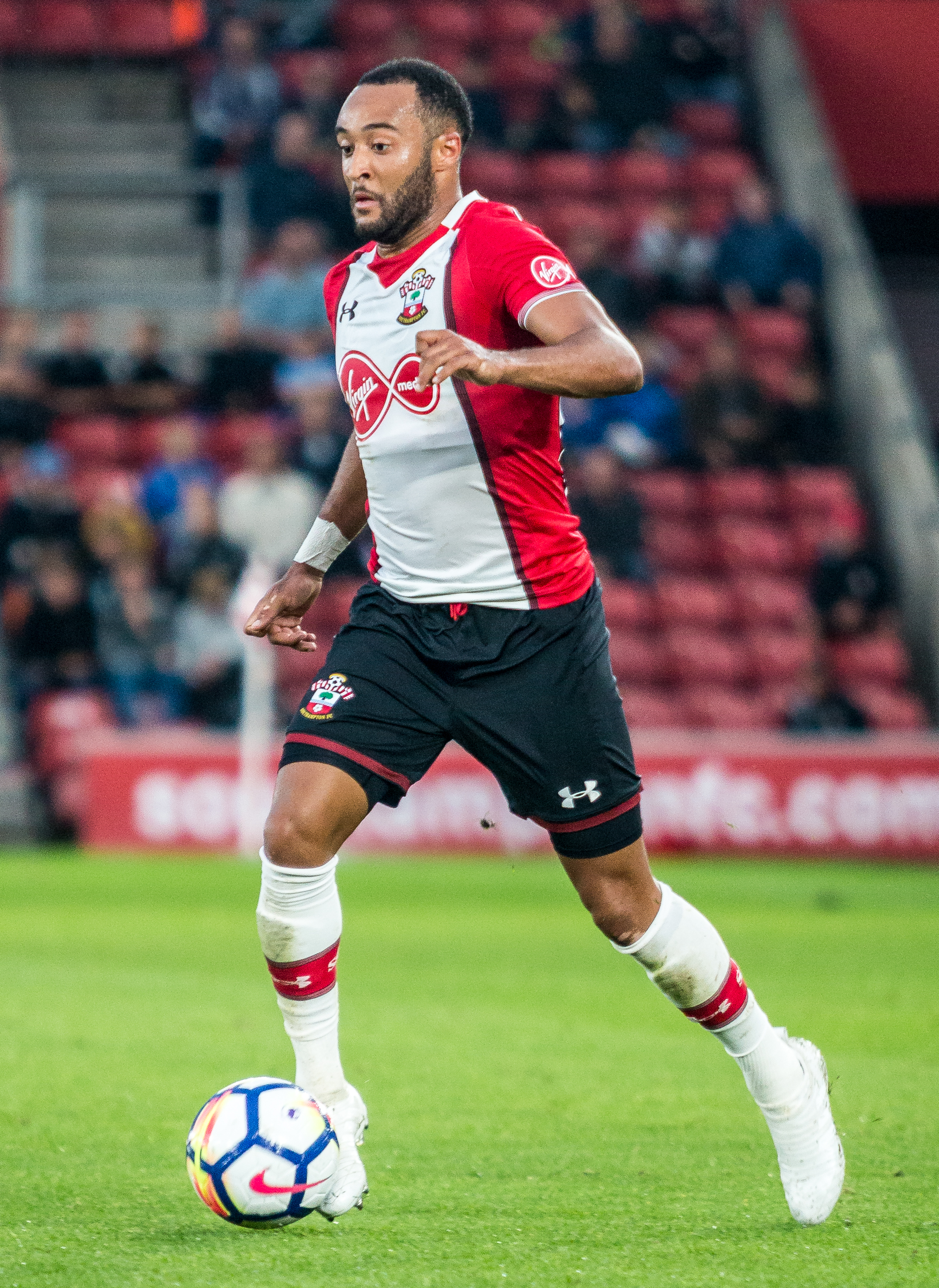
Nathan Redmond equalled the injured Charlie Austin's league goal tally in April, later surpassing it in May.

In their first home game in almost two months, Southampton were held to a goalless draw by local rivals Bournemouth. The hosts enjoyed the majority of possession early on, with a goal from Jay Rodriguez being disallowed due to offside. The Cherries responded later in the first half, with former Saints player Andrew Surman seeing an effort cleared off the line by Steven Davis 12 minutes before the break. The second half started off slow, before both sides began pressuring the goals, with Bournemouth coming close to breaking the deadlock multiple times. In the 77th minute the visitors were awarded a penalty, although it was sent high over the crossbar by Harry Arter. Later in the week, the Saints hosted Crystal Palace and won the game 3–1. Both sides created chances on goal early in the game, but it was the visitors who struck first through Christian Benteke in the 31st minute. Nathan Redmond equalised on the stroke of half-time. The hosts enjoyed the majority of the pressure after the break, and after a number of close calls Maya Yoshida scored his first league goal of the season to put the Saints in front. James Ward-Prowse scored just a minute later, as Southampton dominated Palace and saw out the game to move into the top half of the table. Southampton beat West Bromwich Albion three days later, closing the gap between the two sides to four points (with the Saints still having two games in hand). Jordy Clasie scored the only goal of the game in the 25th minute, striking his first Premier League goal from the edge of the penalty area. The Baggies came close to equalising at various points throughout the game, with goalkeeper Fraser Forster making a number of saves to deny the hosts and defend the win.

The following week, the Saints lost 3–0 to Manchester City at home. After a goalless first half, the visitors opened the scoring ten minutes after the half-time break when Vincent Kompany headed in a corner from David Silva. City continued to enjoy the majority of possession and chances on goal, with Leroy Sané doubling their lead in the 77th minute, before Sergio Agüero scored a third three minutes later to secure the win. Southampton managed just one chance on target in the whole game – a Maya Yoshida header in the second half. The club lost again the following week to league leaders Chelsea at Stamford Bridge, who beat the Saints 4–2. Eden Hazard opened the scoring for the hosts within five minutes, before Oriol Romeu scored his first goal of the season to bring Southampton level. Gary Cahill scored on the stroke of half-time, before Diego Costa doubled Chelsea's lead ten minutes after the break. Costa scored again in the penultimate minute of normal time, before Ryan Bertrand scored a second consolation for the visitors just before the end of the game. The club were held to a goalless draw against Hull City later in the week. The game saw very few chances for either side, with only three shots on target in the 90 minutes. Kamil Grosicki almost scored for the visitors early on with a sixth-minute free kick that hit the post, while Southampton's closest effort came in stoppage time at the end of the game, when Dušan Tadić saw a penalty saved by Eldin Jakupović to keep the Tigers fighting for Premier League safety.

On 7 May, Southampton faced Liverpool at Anfield in a game which ended as a goalless draw. The game featured very few chances on goal for either side, with the Saints failing to manage a shot on target the entire 90 minutes. The best chance of the game came for the home side in the second half, when a handball by Jack Stephens resulted in a penalty; however, James Milner's spot kick was saved by Fraser Forster and the scores remained level. Marko Grujić almost scored with a header late on, but it remained goalless. Three days later the club hosted Arsenal and lost 2–0 to the Gunners. After a first half with very few chances for either side, the visitors opened the scoring after 60 minutes when Alexis Sánchez beat two defenders to score his 20th league goal of the season. 23 minutes later, after being on as a substitute for just three minutes, Olivier Giroud headed in the second, securing Arsenal's ascent to fifth in the table. On 13 May, Southampton played their final away game of the season against relegated Middlesbrough, winning 2–1 to move up to ninth in the table. With a markedly changed lineup (including the debut of centre-back Martín Cáceres), the Saints started the game slowly, but opened the scoring through Jay Rodriguez shortly before half-time. After coming on at the start of the second half, Nathan Redmond doubled the lead for the visitors in the 57th minute. Shane Long missed a penalty less than ten minutes later, before Patrick Bamford scored a consolation for Boro later on. On 17 May, the club drew 0–0 with Manchester United and moved up to eighth in the table. The Saints were awarded a penalty within the opening five minutes for a handball by Eric Bailly; the penalty was taken by Manolo Gabbiadini but saved by Sergio Romero. Bailly forced a save out of Fraser Forster later in the half, and in the second half Anthony Martial hit the post.

On the final day of the season, Southampton hosted Stoke City who beat the Saints by a single goal. Nathan Redmond gave the hosts their best chance of the game when he hit the bar at the end of the first half, before former Southampton striker Peter Crouch scored the only goal of the game on the hour mark. The home side had a number of chances to equalise in the second half through Steven Davis, James Ward-Prowse and Sofiane Boufal, but goalkeeper Jack Butland made a number of saves to deny them. Due to Bournemouth losing and West Bromwich Albion drawing, Southampton remained eighth in the Premier League table.

=== League table ===
Pos	Team	Pld	W	D	L	GF	GA	GD	Pts	Qualification or relegation
6	Manchester United	38	18	15	5	54	29	+25	69	Qualification for the Champions League group stage (Note: Manchester United qualified for the Champions League group stage by winning the 2016–17 UEFA Europa League. Based on their league position (6th), they would have received the spot above to enter the Europa League group stage. This spot was vacated without replacement as per UEFA regulations.)
7	Everton	38	17	10	11	62	44	+18	61	Qualification for the Europa League third qualifying round (Note: Manchester United, winners of the 2016–17 EFL Cup, initially attained a spot in the Europa League third qualifying round. That was passed to the next-highest ranked team in the league not already qualified for UEFA competitions (7th-placed Everton).)
8	Southampton	38	12	10	16	41	48	−7	46	
9	Bournemouth	38	12	10	16	55	67	−12	46	
10	West Bromwich Albion	38	12	9	17	43	51	−8	45	

Source: Premier League
Rules for classification: 1) Points; 2) Goal difference; 3) Goals scored; 4) Play-offs (only if needed to decide champion, teams for relegation or teams for UEFA competitions).

=== Results by matchday ===
Matchday	1	2	3	4	5	6	7	8	9	10	11	12	13	14	15	16	17	18	19	20	21	22	23	24	25	26	27	28	29	30	31	32	33	34	35	36	37	38
Ground	H	A	H	A	H	A	A	H	A	H	A	H	H	A	H	A	A	H	H	A	A	H	A	H	A	A	A	H	H	A	H	A	H	A	H	A	H	H
Result	D	L	D	L	W	W	D	W	D	L	L	D	W	L	W	D	W	L	L	L	L	W	L	L	W	W	L	D	W	W	L	L	D	D	L	W	D	L
Position	7	13	15	18	14	9	10	8	8	9	10	10	10	11	10	9	7	8	9	10	13	11	12	13	11	10	10	10	9	9	9	9	9	10	10	9	8	8

Updated to match(es) played on 21 May 2017. Source: BBC Match Reports
A = Away; H = Home; W = Win; D = Draw; L = Loss

=== Matches ===
13 August 2016 1	Southampton	1–1	Watford	Southampton
15:00 BST	Redmond 58'	Report	Capoue 9'	Stadium: St Mary's Stadium; Attendance: 31,488; Referee: Roger East

19 August 2016 2	Manchester United	2–0	Southampton	Manchester
20:00 BST	Ibrahimović 36', 52' (pen.)	Report		Stadium: Old Trafford; Attendance: 75,326; Referee: Anthony Taylor

27 August 2016 3	Southampton	1–1	Sunderland	Southampton
15:00 BST	Rodriguez 85'	Report	Defoe 80' (pen.)	Stadium: St Mary's Stadium; Attendance: 30,152; Referee: Lee Mason

10 September 2016 4	Arsenal	2–1	Southampton	London
15:00 BST	Koscielny 29'; Cazorla 90+4' (pen.)	Report	Čech 18' (o.g.)	Stadium: Emirates Stadium; Attendance: 59,962; Referee: Bobby Madley

18 September 2016 5	Southampton	1–0	Swansea City	Southampton
14:15 BST	Austin 64'	Report		Stadium: St Mary's Stadium; Attendance: 29,087; Referee: Mike Jones

25 September 2016 6	West Ham United	0–3	Southampton	London
16:00 BST		Report	Austin 40'; Tadić 62'; Ward-Prowse 90+2'	Stadium: London Stadium; Attendance: 56,864; Referee: Jonathan Moss

2 October 2016 7	Leicester City	0–0	Southampton	Leicester
14:15 BST		Report		Stadium: King Power Stadium; Attendance: 31,563; Referee: Martin Atkinson

16 October 2016 8	Southampton	3–1	Burnley	Southampton
16:00 BST	Austin 52', 66' (pen.); Redmond 60'	Report	Vokes 72' (pen.)	Stadium: St Mary's Stadium; Attendance: 29,040; Referee: Mike Dean

23 October 2016 9	Manchester City	1–1	Southampton	Manchester
13:30 BST	Iheanacho 55'	Report	Redmond 27'	Stadium: City of Manchester Stadium; Attendance: 53,731; Referee: Mark Clattenburg

30 October 2016 10	Southampton	0–2	Chelsea	Southampton
16:00 GMT		Report	Hazard 6'; Costa 55'	Stadium: St Mary's Stadium; Attendance: 31,827; Referee: Mike Jones

6 November 2016 11	Hull City	2–1	Southampton	Kingston upon Hull
14:15 GMT	Snodgrass 61'; Dawson 63'	Report	Austin 6' (pen.)	Stadium: KCOM Stadium; Attendance: 17,768; Referee: Graham Scott

19 November 2016 12	Southampton	0–0	Liverpool	Southampton
15:00 GMT		Report		Stadium: St Mary's Stadium; Attendance: 31,848; Referee: Mark Clattenburg

27 November 2016 13	Southampton	1–0	Everton	Southampton
16:30 GMT	Austin 1'	Report		Stadium: St Mary's Stadium; Attendance: 31,132; Referee: Craig Pawson

3 December 2016 14	Crystal Palace	3–0	Southampton	London
15:00 GMT	Benteke 33', 85'; Tomkins 36'	Report		Stadium: Selhurst Park; Attendance: 25,393; Referee: Neil Swarbrick

10 December 2016 15	Southampton	1–0	Middlesbrough	Southampton
15:00 GMT	Boufal 53'	Report		Stadium: St Mary's Stadium; Attendance: 28,976; Referee: Stuart Attwell

14 December 2016 16	Stoke City	0–0	Southampton	Stoke-on-Trent
20:00 GMT		Report		Stadium: bet365 Stadium; Attendance: 27,002; Referee: Anthony Taylor

18 December 2016 17	Bournemouth	1–3	Southampton	Bournemouth
13:30 GMT	Aké 6'	Report	Bertrand 14'; Rodriguez 48', 85'	Stadium: Dean Court; Attendance: 11,113; Referee: Mark Clattenburg

28 December 2016 18	Southampton	1–4	Tottenham Hotspur	Southampton
19:45 GMT	van Dijk 2'	Report	Alli 19', 87'; Kane 52'; Son 85'	Stadium: St Mary's Stadium; Attendance: 31,853; Referee: Mike Dean

31 December 2016 19	Southampton	1–2	West Bromwich Albion	Southampton
15:00 GMT	Long 41'	Report	Phillips 43'; Robson-Kanu 50'	Stadium: St Mary's Stadium; Attendance: 30,975; Referee: Mike Jones

2 January 2017 20	Everton	3–0	Southampton	Liverpool
15:00 GMT	Valencia 73'; Baines 81' (pen.); Lukaku 89'	Report		Stadium: Goodison Park; Attendance: 38,891; Referee: Kevin Friend

14 January 2017 21	Burnley	1–0	Southampton	Burnley
15:00 GMT	Barton 78'	Report		Stadium: Turf Moor; Attendance: 20,254; Referee: Paul Tierney

22 January 2017 22	Southampton	3–0	Leicester City	Southampton
12:00 GMT	Ward-Prowse 26'; Rodriguez 39'; Tadić 85' (pen.)	Report		Stadium: St Mary's Stadium; Attendance: 30,548; Referee: Michael Oliver

31 January 2017 23	Swansea City	2–1	Southampton	Swansea
19:45 GMT	Mawson 38'; Sigurðsson 70'	Report	Long 57'	Stadium: Liberty Stadium; Attendance: 20,359; Referee: Roger East

4 February 2017 24	Southampton	1–3	West Ham United	Southampton
15:00 GMT	Gabbiadini 12'	Report	Carroll 14'; Obiang 44'; Noble 52'	Stadium: St Mary's Stadium; Attendance: 31,891; Referee: Graham Scott

11 February 2017 25	Sunderland	0–4	Southampton	Sunderland
15:00 GMT		Report	Gabbiadini 30', 45'; Denayer 89' (o.g.); Long 90+2'	Stadium: Stadium of Light; Attendance: 39,931; Referee: Paul Tierney

4 March 2017 26	Watford	3–4	Southampton	Watford
15:00 GMT	Deeney 4'; Okaka 79'; Doucouré 90+4'	Report	Tadić 28'; Redmond 45+2', 86'; Gabbiadini 83'	Stadium: Vicarage Road; Attendance: 20,670; Referee: Jonathan Moss

19 March 2017 27	Tottenham Hotspur	2–1	Southampton	London
14:15 GMT	Eriksen 14'; Alli 33' (pen.)	Report	Ward-Prowse 52'	Stadium: White Hart Lane; Attendance: 31,697; Referee: Andre Marriner

1 April 2017 28	Southampton	0–0	Bournemouth	Southampton
17:30 BST		Report		Stadium: St Mary's Stadium; Attendance: 31,847; Referee: Jonathan Moss

5 April 2017 29	Southampton	3–1	Crystal Palace	Southampton
19:45 BST	Redmond 45'; Yoshida 84'; Ward-Prowse 85'	Report	Benteke 31'	Stadium: St Mary's Stadium; Attendance: 29,968; Referee: Roger East

8 April 2017 30	West Bromwich Albion	0–1	Southampton	West Bromwich
15:00 BST		Report	Clasie 25'	Stadium: The Hawthorns; Attendance: 24,697; Referee: Chris Kavanagh

15 April 2017 31	Southampton	0–3	Manchester City	Southampton
17:30 BST		Report	Kompany 55'; Sané 77'; Agüero 80'	Stadium: St Mary's Stadium; Attendance: 31,850; Referee: Neil Swarbrick

25 April 2017 32	Chelsea	4–2	Southampton	London
19:45 BST	Hazard 5'; Cahill 45+1'; Costa 53', 89'	Report	Romeu 24'; Bertrand 90+4'	Stadium: Stamford Bridge; Attendance: 41,168; Referee: Lee Mason

29 April 2017 33	Southampton	0–0	Hull City	Southampton
15:00 BST		Report		Stadium: St Mary's Stadium; Attendance: 31,120; Referee: Mike Dean

7 May 2017 34	Liverpool	0–0	Southampton	Liverpool
13:30 BST		Report		Stadium: Anfield; Attendance: 53,159; Referee: Bobby Madley

10 May 2017 35	Southampton	0–2	Arsenal	Southampton
19:45 BST		Report	Sánchez 60'; Giroud 83'	Stadium: St Mary's Stadium; Attendance: 31,474; Referee: Jonathan Moss

13 May 2017 36	Middlesbrough	1–2	Southampton	Middlesbrough
15:00 BST	Bamford 72'	Report	Rodriguez 42'; Redmond 57'	Stadium: Riverside Stadium; Attendance: 28,203; Referee: Anthony Taylor

17 May 2017 37	Southampton	0–0	Manchester United	Southampton
19:45 BST	Romeu (yellow card) 10'; Cédric (yellow card) 37'	Report	Jones (yellow card) 51'	Stadium: St Mary's Stadium; Attendance: 31,425; Referee: Mike Dean

21 May 2017 38	Southampton	0–1	Stoke City	Southampton
15:00 BST		Report	Crouch 60'	Stadium: St Mary's Stadium; Attendance: 31,286; Referee: Lee Probert

== FA Cup ==
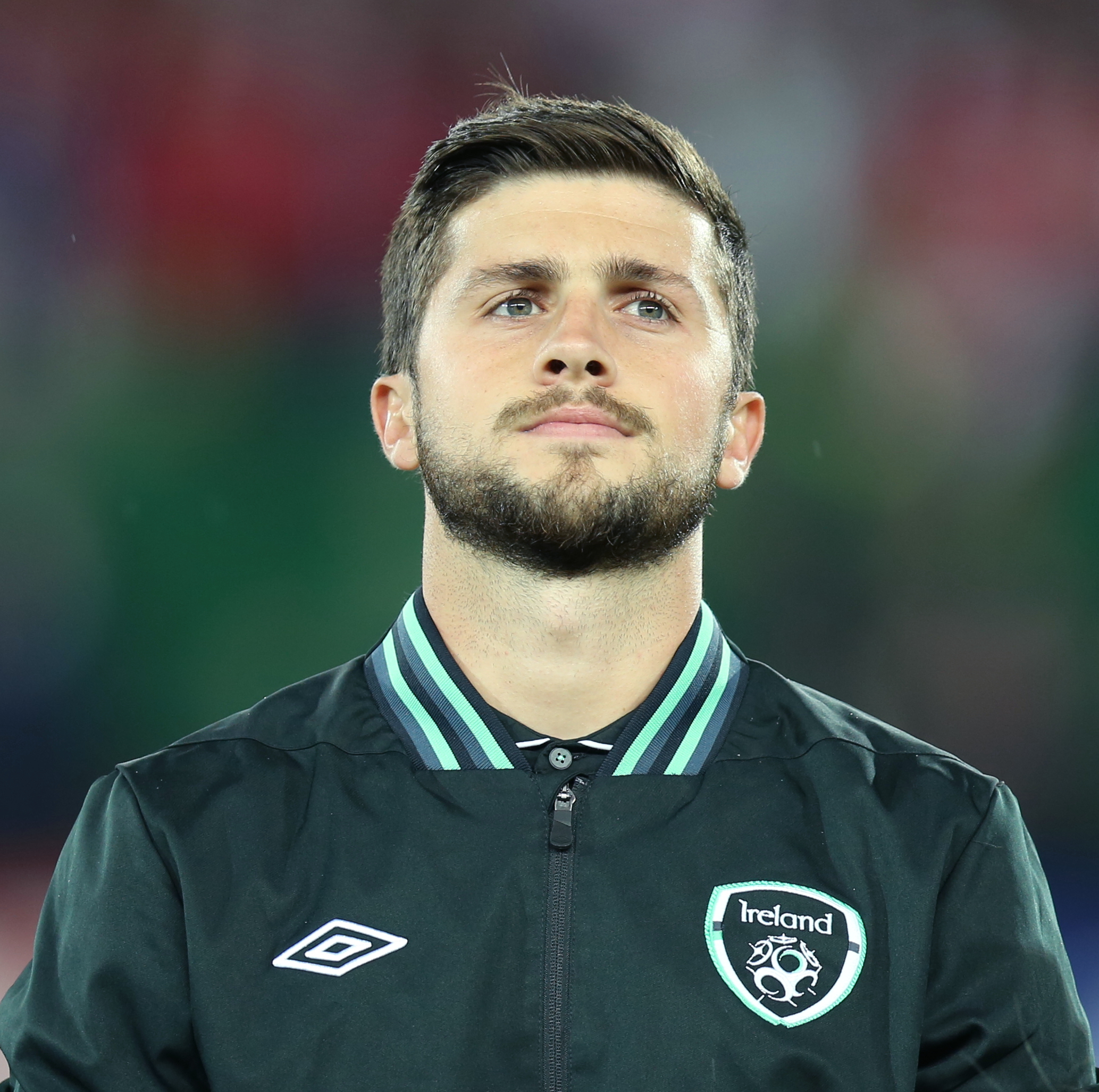
Shane Long scored the only goal of the game in the third round replay against Norwich City on 18 January 2017.

Norwich City (7 January 2017)

Southampton entered the 2016–17 FA Cup in the third round, facing Championship side Norwich City on 7 January 2017 in a match which ended in a 2–2 draw. The Premier League side went one up after 37 minutes, when defender Virgil van Dijk converted a cross from winger Dušan Tadić. After the break, however, the hosts equalised through a Steven Whittaker penalty, following a foul by young goalkeeper Harry Lewis on striker Cameron Jerome. In the 67th minute, Maya Yoshida scored his first goal of the season when he headed in a cross from Pierre-Emile Højbjerg, but in stoppage time at the end of the match Steven Naismith headed in to equalise and force a replay.

Norwich City (replay) (18 January 2017)

In the replay at St Mary's Stadium, Southampton beat Norwich City by a single late goal to advance to the fourth round of the FA Cup. The game featured very few chances for either side until late in the game, with Norwich having no shots on target and only three shots overall in the full 90 minutes, with the hosts enjoying the majority of possession. Shane Long, James Ward-Prowse and Nathan Redmond came close to breaking the deadlock later on, and it was Long who on his 100th appearance for the club eventually scored the only goal of the game in stoppage time, when he bundled in a cross from winger Sam McQueen after his header was saved by Michael McGovern.

Arsenal (28 January 2017)

In the fourth round of the tournament, Southampton were knocked out by Arsenal at home. Danny Welbeck, in his first start since May 2016, opened the scoring after 15 minutes and doubled the visitors' lead just seven minutes later, the second set up by former Southampton player Alex Oxlade-Chamberlain. Ten minutes before half-time Theo Walcott, another former Saint, scored a third for Arsenal. The Gunners continued to dominate in the second half, with Walcott scoring two more to complete his hat-trick and give the visitors a 5–0 win. The result was Southampton's heaviest home defeat in the FA Cup since February 1910, as well as their joint-heaviest defeat at St Mary's Stadium.

7 January 2017 Round 3	Norwich City	2–2	Southampton	Norwich
15:00 GMT	Whittaker 52' (pen.); Naismith 90+3'	Report	van Dijk 38'; Yoshida 67'	Stadium: Carrow Road; Attendance: 12,479; Referee: Chris Kavanagh

18 January 2017 Round 3 replay	Southampton	1–0	Norwich City	Southampton
19:45 GMT	Long 90+2'	Report		Stadium: St Mary's Stadium; Attendance: 13,517; Referee: Jonathan Moss

28 January 2017 Round 4	Southampton	0–5	Arsenal	Southampton
17:30 GMT		Report	Welbeck 15', 22'; Walcott 35', 69', 84'	Stadium: St Mary's Stadium; Attendance: 31,288; Referee: Kevin Friend

== EFL Cup ==
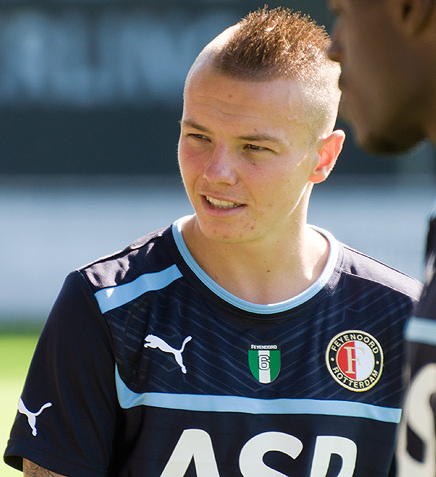
Midfielder Jordy Clasie scored his first goal for the club in their 2–0 win over Arsenal on 30 November 2016.

Crystal Palace (21 September 2016)

As a club competing in both the Premier League and the UEFA Europa League, Southampton entered the 2016–17 EFL Cup in the third round. On 21 September 2016 the club hosted Crystal Palace, beating the fellow Premier League side 2–0 to advance to the fourth round. Charlie Austin scored his fourth goal in three games in all competitions from the penalty spot in the 33rd minute to open the scoring, following a foul by Martin Kelly on Shane Long. After the break, young midfielder Jake Hesketh scored his first goal for the club (in his first senior appearance since December 2014) to double Southampton's lead, which they held until the end to ensure their place in the fourth round of the tournament.

Sunderland (26 October 2016)

In the fourth round of the EFL Cup, Southampton were drawn at home against Sunderland. The Saints beat the visitors on 26 October by a solitary goal to advance to the fifth round of the tournament. The only goal of the game was scored by Moroccan winger Sofiane Boufal's long-range strike into the top corner, on his first start for the home side since his move in the summer. Very few chances were enjoyed by either side throughout the 90 minutes (Southampton had only one shot on target, while Sunderland had two), and Sunderland manager David Moyes was dismissed by the referee late on in the game as he and his side appealed for a penalty following a tackle by Maya Yoshida on Victor Anichebe.

Arsenal (30 November 2016)

On 30 November 2016, Southampton faced Arsenal in the fifth round of the EFL Cup, winning 2–0 to advance to the semi-finals of the tournament for the first time since 1987. Jordy Clasie opened the scoring within the first 15 minutes of the game with his first goal for the club, striking from the edge of the penalty area after Sofiane Boufal's initial effort was blocked. The home side increased the pressure in search of an equaliser, but the Saints struck again through Ryan Bertrand shortly before half time to double their lead going into the break. The Gunners began the second half the stronger side, but the Saints later responded and came close to scoring a third goal, with Boufal and Pierre-Emile Højbjerg coming close late on.

Liverpool (first leg) (11 January 2017)

In the first leg of the EFL Cup semi-final, Southampton beat Liverpool 1–0 at St Mary's. Liverpool enjoyed the majority of possession early in the match, but Nathan Redmond opened the scoring for the hosts within 20 minutes with his first goal in the competition, after being set up by Jay Rodriguez. Redmond almost made it two for the Saints on two separate occasions before the break, but was denied both times by Liverpool goalkeeper Loris Karius. In the second half, the home side again came closing to doubling their lead when Cédric Soares shot wide, before Shane Long set up another scoring opportunity for Redmond, who hit the crossbar with a chipped shot.

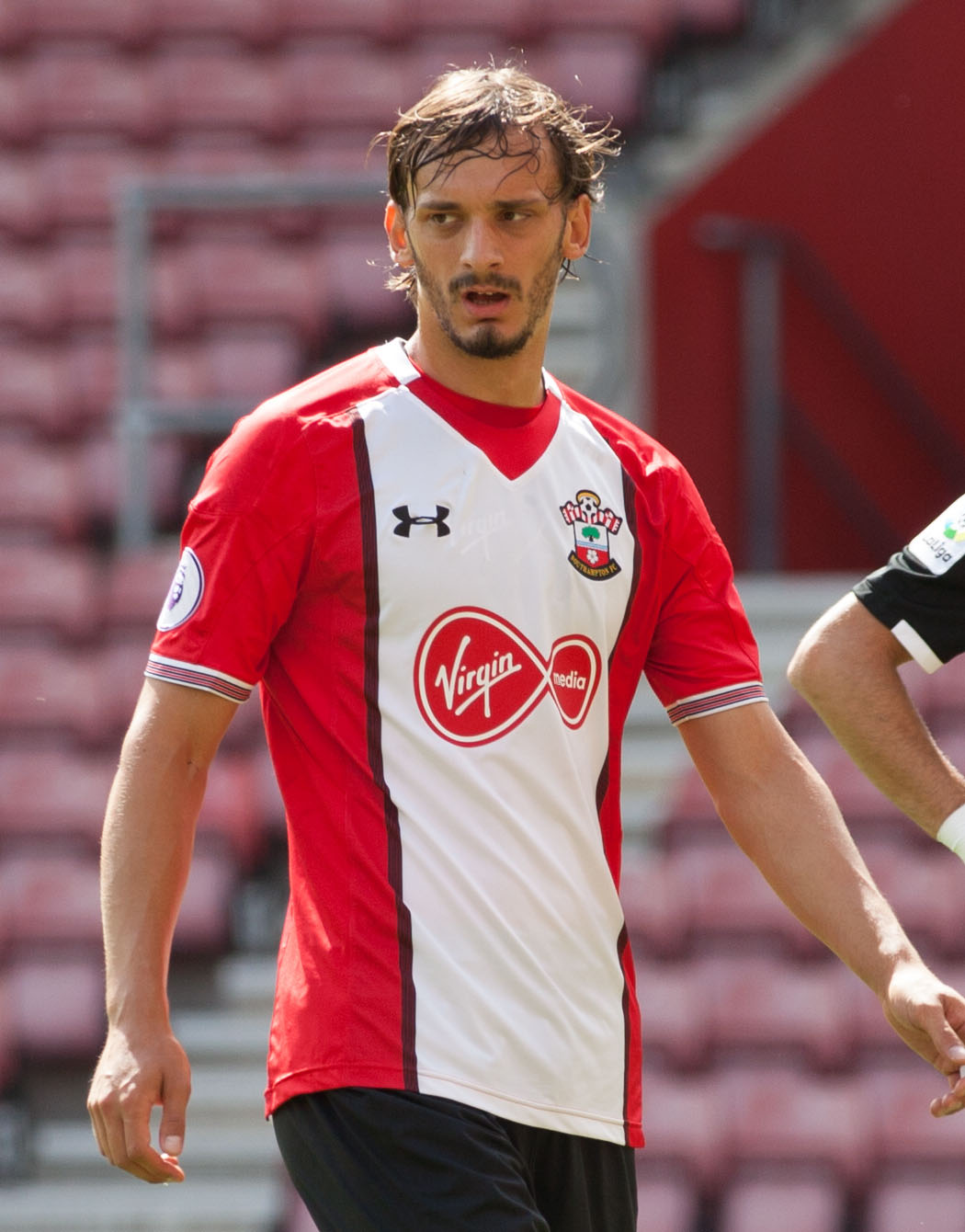
Manolo Gabbiadini scored both of Southampton's goals in the 2017 EFL Cup Final.

Liverpool (second leg) (25 January 2017)

In the second leg, Southampton beat Liverpool 1–0 to secure a 2–0 aggregate win and advance to the 2017 EFL Cup Final. Liverpool dominated possession throughout the majority of the game, but the Saints enjoyed more clear-cut chances to score in the first half, with Dušan Tadić and Steven Davis coming closest to breaking the deadlock. The hosts increased the pressure after the break, but Daniel Sturridge missed multiple chances on goal to leave the Saints with the advantage. Emre Can came closest for Liverpool in the 53rd minute, when goalkeeper Fraser Forster failed to hold his shot before saving it off the line to keep his clean sheet. Shane Long finally scored the only goal of the game in stoppage time, securing Southampton's first cup final since 2003 and their first EFL Cup final since 1979. The result made Southampton the first team to advance to the final of the tournament without conceding a single goal.

Manchester United (26 February 2017)

In the 2017 EFL Cup Final on 26 February 2017, Southampton lost 3–2 to Manchester United to finish as runners-up. Manolo Gabbiadini scored early on in the game, but the goal was controversially disallowed for offside. Zlatan Ibrahimović opened the scoring in the 19th minute, with a free-kick awarded following a foul by Oriol Romeu on Ander Herrera. Despite the Saints enjoying a spell of pressure on the United goal, Jesse Lingard doubled the lead in the 38th minute. Gabbiadini brought Southampton back into the game on the stroke of half-time, converting James Ward-Prowse's cross.

After the break, Gabbiadini equalised for the Saints with his fifth goal in his first three games, as the Saints continued to dominate possession and chances on goal. The Saints continued having chances to take the lead throughout the second half, as Dušan Tadić and Ward-Prowse saw efforts saved by United goalkeeper David de Gea, and Oriol Romeu hit the post with a header from a corner, but it was Ibrahimović who scored his second and United's third to win the cup for the Red Devils.

21 September 2016 Round 3	Southampton	2–0	Crystal Palace	Southampton
19:45 BST	Austin 33' (pen.); Hesketh 63'	Report		Stadium: St Mary's Stadium; Attendance: 14,080; Referee: James Adcock

26 October 2016 Round 4	Southampton	1–0	Sunderland	Southampton
19:45 BST	Boufal 66'	Report		Stadium: St Mary's Stadium; Attendance: 21,460; Referee: Chris Kavanagh

30 November 2016 Round 5	Arsenal	0–2	Southampton	London
19:45 GMT		Report	Clasie 13'; Bertrand 38'	Stadium: Emirates Stadium; Attendance: 59,013; Referee: Kevin Friend

11 January 2017 Semi-Final Leg 1	Southampton	1–0	Liverpool	Southampton
19:45 GMT	Redmond 20'	Report		Stadium: St Mary's Stadium; Attendance: 31,480; Referee: Neil Swarbrick

25 January 2017 Semi-Final Leg 2	Liverpool	0–1	Southampton	Liverpool
20:00 GMT		Report	Long 90+1'	Stadium: Anfield; Attendance: 52,238; Referee: Ben Atkinson

26 February 2017 Final	Manchester United	3–2	Southampton	London
16:30 GMT	Ibrahimović 19', 87'; Lingard 38'	Report	Gabbiadini 45+1', 49'	Stadium: Wembley Stadium; Attendance: 85,264; Referee: Andre Marriner

== UEFA Europa League ==
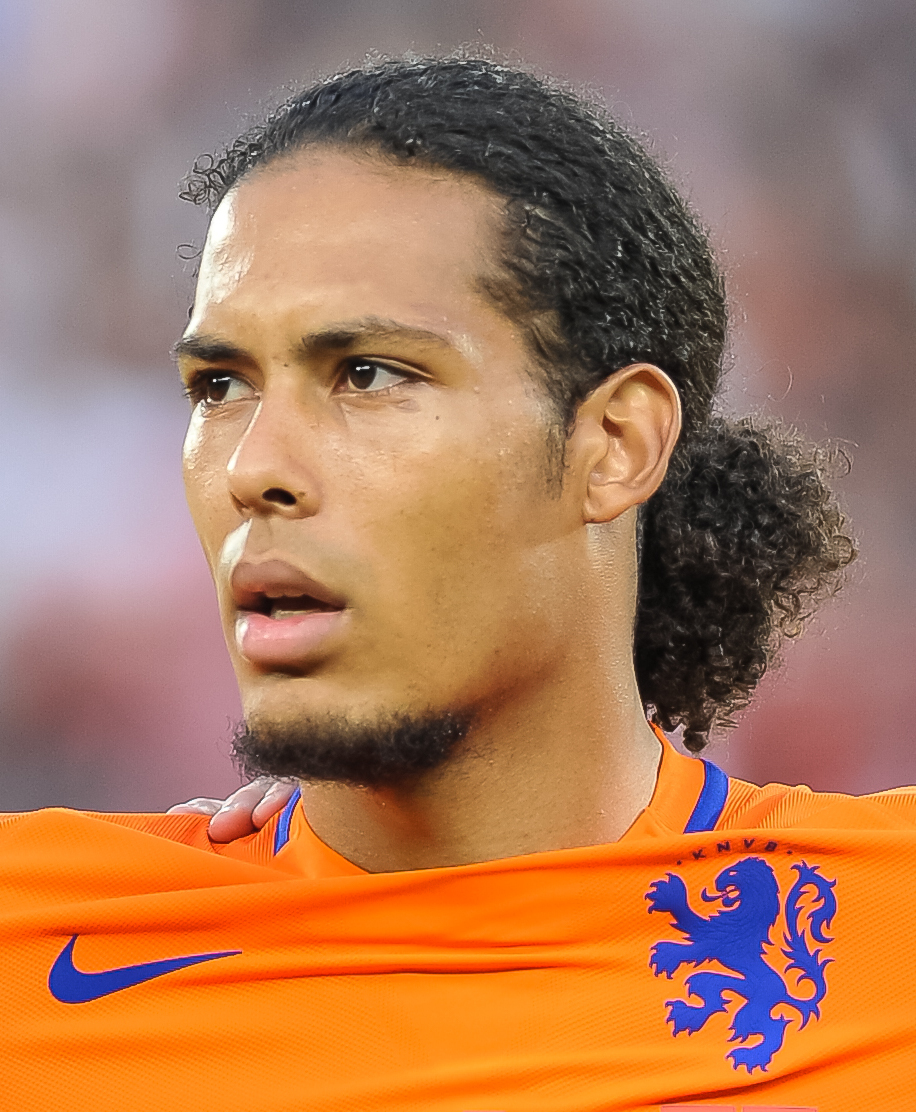
Defender Virgil van Dijk scored two goals in Southampton's six UEFA Europa League group stage matches.

Sparta Prague (15 September 2016)

Southampton entered the 2016–17 UEFA Europa League at the group stage, when they were drawn in Group K with Internazionale, Sparta Prague and Hapoel Be'er Sheva. In the opening match against Sparta Prague on 15 September 2016, the Saints picked up their first win of the season when they beat the Czech side 3–0. Charlie Austin opened the scoring with a fifth-minute penalty, before doubling his side's lead 20 minutes later with a header. Jay Rodriguez scored a third in added time at the end of the match to send Southampton to the top of the group.

Hapoel Be'er Sheva (29 September 2016)

In their second match of the tournament, the Saints were held to a goalless draw at Israeli champions Hapoel Be'er Sheva. The game did not feature many goalscoring opportunities for either side in the first half, which Hapoel largely dominated, although James Ward-Prowse had a number of chances on goal after the break. The home side came closest to winning the game in the second half through Maor Melikson and Ben Sahar chances, however the deadlock stayed unbroken and both sides remained on level points at the top of the group table.

Internazionale (20 October 2016)

On 20 October 2016 the Saints travelled to the San Siro to face Internazionale, losing 1–0 to the Italian side. The visitors almost scored on a number of occasions in the first half, notably when Ward-Prowse's shot went over the crossbar and Cuco Martina's went wide of the post. Antonio Candreva scored the only goal of the game in the 67th minute, before Marcelo Brozović received a second booking and was sent off ten minutes later. However, Southampton could not take advantage of the extra player and succumbed to their first defeat in the tournament.

Internazionale (3 November 2016)

Southampton hosted Internazionale on 3 November 2016, winning 2–1 to secure second in the group K table. After Inter captain Mauro Icardi opened the scoring in the 33rd minute, the Saints were awarded a controversial penalty for a handball by Ivan Perišić just before half time, while Antonio Candreva was booked for an off-the-ball incident involving Sam McQueen. Dušan Tadić's penalty was saved by Samir Handanović, before the half ended with more drama between the players of both sides. The hosts increased the pressure in the second half, leading to defender Virgil van Dijk equalising in the 64th minute with a shot in the box following a corner. Less than five minutes later, Southampton went ahead as Yuto Nagatomo turned Tadić's cross into the Internazionale goal. Southampton held on and almost scored a third for an historic win.

Sparta Prague (24 November 2016)

On 24 November, Southampton lost at Sparta Prague by a single goal to remain second in the group. Despite dominating possession for most of the match, the Saints enjoyed few clear chances and went behind early on when defender Costa Nhamoinesu scored a volley from close range following a free kick, which was poorly defended by the Premier League club. Goalkeeper Fraser Forster made a number of saves to deny further goals, which Prague threatened to score later on in the game. The result left Southampton needing a goalless draw or win over Hapoel Be'er Sheva in the final group stage game in order to proceed to the knockout stages.

Hapoel Be'er Sheva (8 December 2016)

Southampton were knocked out of the UEFA Europa League on 8 December 2016 when they drew 1–1 with Hapoel Be'er Sheva at St Mary's Stadium. Despite the home side dominating much of the possession and having many more chances on goal, it was the visitors who took the advantage in the 78th minute when Maor Buzaglo scored the Israeli side's only shot on target after poor defending from the Saints, who were left needing two goals in just over ten minutes in order to advance to the knockout stages. Defender Virgil van Dijk pulled one back in stoppage time, and Maya Yoshida came close to winning the game with a last-minute header, but the game ended level and Hapoel finished the group in second place.

=== Group table ===
Pos	Team	Pld	W	D	L	GF	GA	GD	Pts	Qualification	SPP	HBS	SOU	INT
1	(Czech Republic) Sparta Prague	6	4	0	2	8	6	+2	12	Advance to knockout phase	—	2–0	1–0	3–1
2	(Israel) Hapoel Be'er Sheva	6	2	2	2	6	6	0	8	Advance to knockout phase	0–1	—	0–0	3–2
3	(England) Southampton	6	2	2	2	6	4	+2	8		3–0	1–1	—	2–1
4	(Italy) Internazionale	6	2	0	4	7	11	−4	6		2–1	0–2	1–0	—

Source: UEFA
Rules for classification: Group stage tiebreakers

=== Matches ===
15 September 2016 Group Stage	Southampton	3–0	Sparta Prague	Southampton
20:05 BST	Austin 5' (pen.), 27'; Rodriguez 90+2'	Report		Stadium: St Mary's Stadium; Attendance: 25,125; Referee: Manuel Gräfe

29 September 2016 Group Stage	Hapoel Be'er Sheva	0–0	Southampton	Be'er Sheva, Israel
18:00 BST		Report		Stadium: Turner Stadium; Attendance: 16,138; Referee: Stefan Johannesson

20 October 2016 Group Stage	Internazionale	1–0	Southampton	Milan, Italy
19:00 BST	Candreva 67'	Report		Stadium: San Siro; Attendance: 26,719; Referee: Gediminas Mažeika

3 November 2016 Group Stage	Southampton	2–1	Internazionale	Southampton
20:05 GMT	van Dijk 64'; Nagatomo 69' (o.g.)	Report	Icardi 33'	Stadium: St Mary's Stadium; Attendance: 30,389; Referee: Paweł Gil

24 November 2016 Group Stage	Sparta Prague	1–0	Southampton	Prague, Czech Republic
18:00 GMT	Nhamoinesu 11'	Report		Stadium: Generali Arena; Attendance: 17,429; Referee: Jesús Gil Manzano

8 December 2016 Group Stage	Southampton	1–1	Hapoel Be'er Sheva	Southampton
20:05 GMT	van Dijk 90+1'	Report	Buzaglo 78'	Stadium: St Mary's Stadium; Attendance: 30,416; Referee: Paolo Tagliavento

== Squad statistics ==
No.	Pos.	Nat.	Name	League		FA Cup		EFL Cup		Europe		Total		Discipline	
No.	Pos.	Nat.	Name	Apps.	Goals	Apps.	Goals	Apps.	Goals	Apps.	Goals	Apps.	Goals	Yellow card	Red card
1	GK	(England)	Fraser Forster	38	0	0	0	4	0	6	0	48	0	3	0
2	DF	(Portugal)	Cédric Soares	30	0	0	0	3	0	1	0	34	0	7	0
3	DF	(Japan)	Maya Yoshida	23	1	2	1	6	0	6	0	37	2	3	0
4	MF	(Netherlands)	Jordy Clasie	12(4)	1	2	0	3(1)	1	2	0	19(5)	2	3	0
5	DF	(Romania)	Florin Gardoș	0	0	1	0	0	0	0	0	1	0	0	0
7	FW	(Republic of Ireland)	Shane Long	10(22)	3	3	1	2(3)	1	4(1)	0	19(26)	5	2	0
8	MF	(Northern Ireland)	Steven Davis	29(3)	0	0	0	4	0	1(3)	0	34(6)	0	3	0
9	FW	(England)	Jay Rodriguez	9(15)	5	1(1)	0	3(1)	0	3(1)	1	16(18)	6	1	0
10	FW	(England)	Charlie Austin	11(4)	6	0	0	1	1	2(3)	2	14(7)	9	1	0
11	MF	(Serbia)	Dušan Tadić	30(3)	3	1(1)	0	3(1)	0	3(2)	0	37(7)	3	5	0
12	DF	(Uruguay)	Martín Cáceres	1	0	0	0	0	0	0	0	1	0	0	0
13	GK	(England)	Alex McCarthy	0	0	0	0	2	0	0	0	2	0	0	0
14	MF	(Spain)	Oriol Romeu	35	1	0(2)	0	3	0	5(1)	0	43(3)	1	13	0
15	DF	(Curaçao)	Cuco Martina	6(3)	0	2	0	2	0	5	0	15(3)	0	0	0
16	MF	(England)	James Ward-Prowse	22(8)	4	2	0	4(1)	0	5(1)	0	33(10)	4	5	0
17	DF	(Netherlands)	Virgil van Dijk	21	1	1	1	2	0	6	2	30	4	4	1
18	MF	(England)	Harrison Reed	1(2)	0	3	0	3	0	0	0	7(2)	0	0	0
19	MF	(Morocco)	Sofiane Boufal	12(12)	1	0	0	2(1)	1	0(2)	0	14(15)	2	5	0
20	FW	(Italy)	Manolo Gabbiadini	10(1)	4	0	0	1	2	0	0	11(1)	6	1	0
21	DF	(England)	Ryan Bertrand	28	2	1	0	4	1	1	0	34	3	4	0
22	FW	(England)	Nathan Redmond	32(5)	7	0(3)	0	3(2)	1	4(1)	0	39(11)	8	3	1
23	MF	(Denmark)	Pierre-Emile Højbjerg	14(8)	0	2	0	1(4)	0	5(1)	0	22(13)	0	3	0
24	DF	(England)	Jack Stephens	15(2)	0	3	0	3	0	0	0	21(2)	0	2	0
26	DF	(France)	Jérémy Pied	1(3)	0	0	0	0	0	0	0	1(3)	0	0	0
27	MF	(Wales)	Lloyd Isgrove	0	0	1	0	1	0	0	0	2	0	0	0
28	GK	(England)	Stuart Taylor	0	0	0	0	0	0	0	0	0	0	0	0
32	FW	(England)	Olufela Olomola	0	0	0	0	0(1)	0	0	0	0(1)	0	1	0
33	DF	(England)	Matt Targett	5	0	0	0	1	0	2	0	8	0	1	0
35	DF	(England)	Alfie Jones	0	0	0	0	0	0	0	0	0	0	0	0
38	DF	(England)	Sam McQueen	5(8)	0	2	0	2	0	3	0	12(8)	0	0	0
39	MF	(England)	Josh Sims	1(6)	0	3	0	0(2)	0	1	0	5(8)	0	1	0
40	GK	(Tunisia)	Mouez Hassen	0	0	0	0	0	0	0	0	0	0	0	0
41	GK	(England)	Harry Lewis	0	0	3	0	0	0	0	0	3	0	0	0
42	MF	(England)	Jake Hesketh	0	0	0	0	1	1	1	0	2	1	0	0
43	DF	(France)	Yan Valery	0	0	0	0	0	0	0	0	0	0	0	0
Players with appearances who left before the end of the season
6	DF	(Portugal)	José Fonte	17	0	0	0	2	0	0	0	19	0	2	0

=== Most appearances ===
#	Pos.	Nat.	Name	League		FA Cup		EFL Cup		Europe		Total		
#	Pos.	Nat.	Name	Starts	Subs	Starts	Subs	Starts	Subs	Starts	Subs	Starts	Subs	Total
1	FW	(England)	Nathan Redmond	32	4	0	3	3	2	4	1	39	11	50
2	GK	(England)	Fraser Forster	38	0	0	0	4	0	6	0	48	0	48
3	MF	(Spain)	Oriol Romeu	35	0	0	2	3	0	5	1	43	3	46
4	FW	(Republic of Ireland)	Shane Long	10	22	3	0	2	3	4	1	19	26	45
5	MF	(Serbia)	Dušan Tadić	30	3	1	1	3	1	3	2	37	7	44
6	MF	(England)	James Ward-Prowse	22	8	2	0	4	1	5	1	33	10	43
7	MF	(Northern Ireland)	Steven Davis	29	3	0	0	4	0	1	3	34	6	40
8	DF	(Japan)	Maya Yoshida	23	0	2	0	6	0	6	0	37	0	37
9	MF	(Denmark)	Pierre-Emile Højbjerg	14	8	2	0	1	4	4	1	22	13	35
10	DF	(Portugal)	Cédric Soares	30	0	0	0	3	0	1	0	34	0	34
10	DF	(England)	Ryan Bertrand	28	0	1	0	4	0	1	0	34	0	34
10	FW	(England)	Jay Rodriguez	9	15	1	1	3	1	3	1	16	18	34

=== Top goalscorers ===
#	Pos.	Nat.	Name	League		FA Cup		EFL Cup		Europe		Total		
#	Pos.	Nat.	Name	Goals	Apps.	Goals	Apps.	Goals	Apps.	Goals	Apps.	Goals	Apps.	GPG
1	FW	(England)	Charlie Austin	6	15	0	0	1	1	2	5	9	21	0.42
2	FW	(England)	Nathan Redmond	7	36	0	3	1	5	0	5	8	50	0.16
3	FW	(Italy)	Manolo Gabbiadini	4	11	0	0	2	1	0	0	6	12	0.50
3	FW	(England)	Jay Rodriguez	5	24	0	2	0	4	1	4	6	34	0.17
5	FW	(Republic of Ireland)	Shane Long	3	33	1	2	1	5	0	5	5	46	0.10
6	DF	(Netherlands)	Virgil van Dijk	1	21	1	1	0	2	2	6	4	30	0.13
6	MF	(England)	James Ward-Prowse	4	30	0	2	0	5	0	6	4	43	0.09
8	DF	(England)	Ryan Bertrand	2	28	0	1	1	4	0	1	3	34	0.08
8	MF	(Serbia)	Dušan Tadić	3	33	0	2	0	4	0	5	3	44	0.06
10	MF	(Netherlands)	Jordy Clasie	1	16	0	2	1	4	0	2	2	24	0.08
10	MF	(Morocco)	Sofiane Boufal	1	24	0	0	1	3	0	2	2	29	0.06
10	DF	(Japan)	Maya Yoshida	1	23	1	2	0	6	0	6	2	37	0.05

== Transfers ==
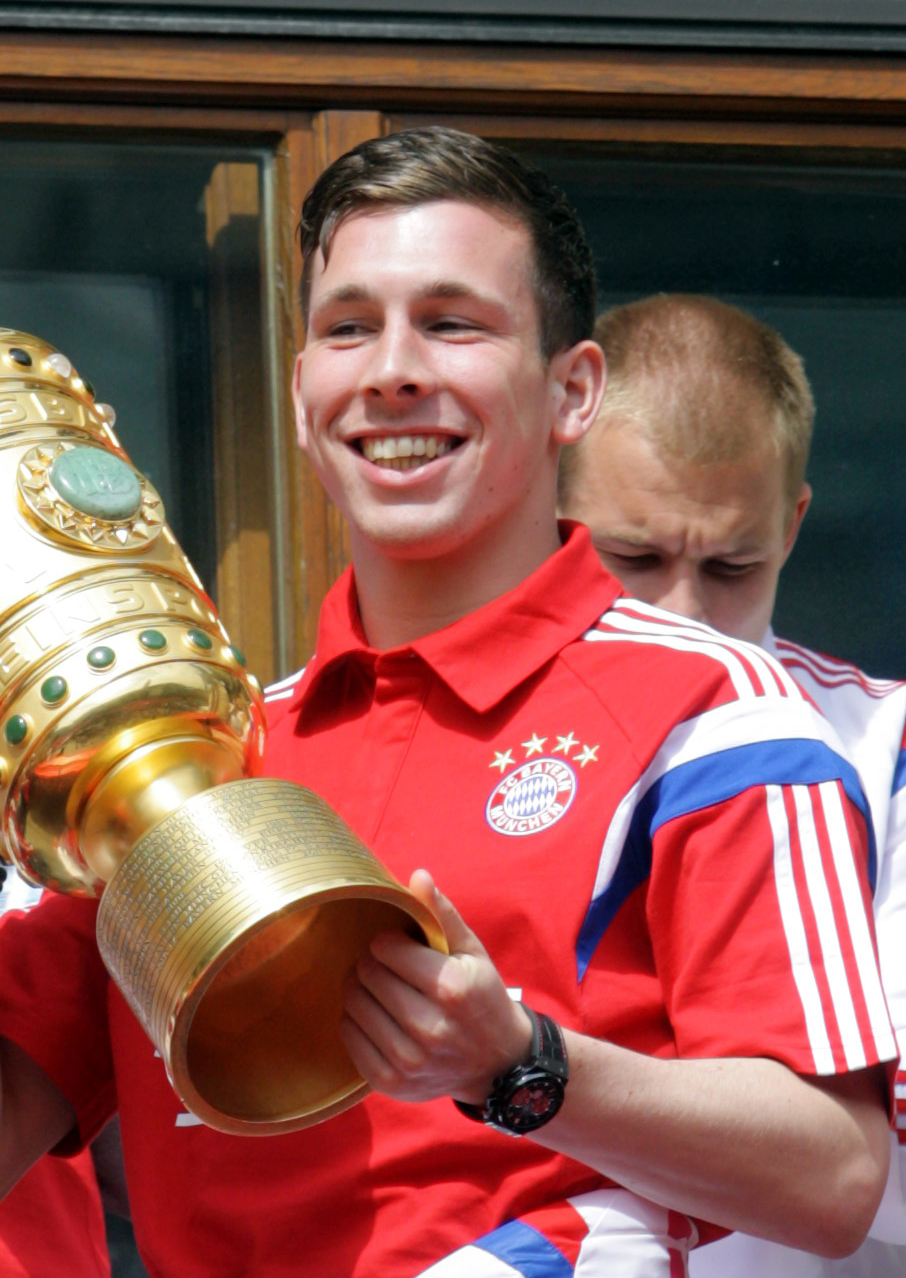
Pierre-Emile Højbjerg was signed for a fee of around £12.8 million in July 2016.

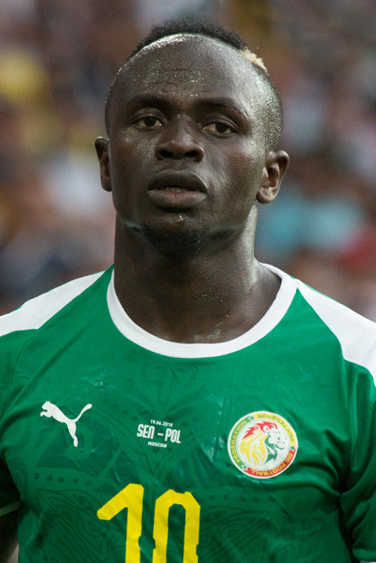
Sadio Mané was sold to Liverpool for a club record fee on 1 July 2016.

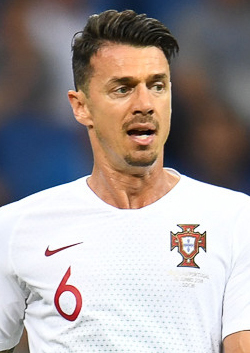
After seven years with the club, José Fonte left the Saints in January 2017.

Players transferred in

Date	Pos.	Name	Club	Fee	Ref.
1 July 2016	FW	(England) Nathan Redmond	(England) Norwich City	Undisclosed	
11 July 2016	MF	(Denmark) Pierre-Emile Højbjerg	(Germany) Bayern Munich	Undisclosed	
1 August 2016	GK	(England) Alex McCarthy	(England) Crystal Palace	Undisclosed	
1 August 2016	DF	(France) Jérémy Pied	(France) Nice	Free	
26 August 2016	GK	(England) Stuart Taylor	None (free agent)		
29 August 2016	MF	(Morocco) Sofiane Boufal	(France) Lille	£16 million	
31 January 2017	FW	(Italy) Manolo Gabbiadini	(Italy) Napoli	£14 million	
16 February 2017	DF	(Uruguay) Martín Cáceres	None (free agent)		

Players loaned in

Start date	Pos.	Name	Club	End date	Ref.
31 January 2017	GK	(France) Mouez Hassen	(France) Nice	End of season	

Players transferred out

Date	Pos.	Name	Club	Fee	Ref.
1 July 2016	FW	(Spain) Juanmi	(Spain) Real Sociedad	Undisclosed	
1 July 2016	MF	(Senegal) Sadio Mané	(England) Liverpool	Undisclosed	
1 July 2016	MF	(Kenya) Victor Wanyama	(England) Tottenham Hotspur	£11,000,000	
11 July 2016	FW	(Italy) Graziano Pellè	(China) Shandong Luneng	Undisclosed	
5 August 2016	DF	(England) Bevis Mugabi	(England) Yeovil Town	Free	
15 August 2016	DF	(England) Jordan Turnbull	(England) Coventry City	Undisclosed	
7 January 2017	MF	(England) Dominic Gape	(England) Wycombe Wanderers	Free	
20 January 2017	DF	(Portugal) José Fonte	(England) West Ham United	£8 million	

Players loaned out

Start date	Pos.	Name	Club	End date	Ref.
1 July 2016	DF	(England) Jason McCarthy	(England) Walsall	End of season	
29 July 2016	GK	(Argentina) Paulo Gazzaniga	(Spain) Rayo Vallecano	End of season	
11 August 2016	FW	(England) Sam Gallagher	(England) Blackburn Rovers	End of season	
31 August 2016	MF	(England) Dominic Gape	(England) Wycombe Wanderers	3 January 2017	

Players released

Date	Pos.	Name	Subsequent club	Join date	Ref.
30 June 2016	MF	(Uruguay) Gastón Ramírez	(England) Middlesbrough	18 July 2016	
30 June 2016	GK	(Gibraltar) Will Britt	(England) Salisbury	5 August 2016	
30 June 2016	DF	(Nigeria) Josh Debayo	(England) Leicester City	30 September 2016	
30 June 2016	GK	(England) Kelvin Davis	None (retired)		
