= Oriol Romeu =

Spanish footballer (born 1991)

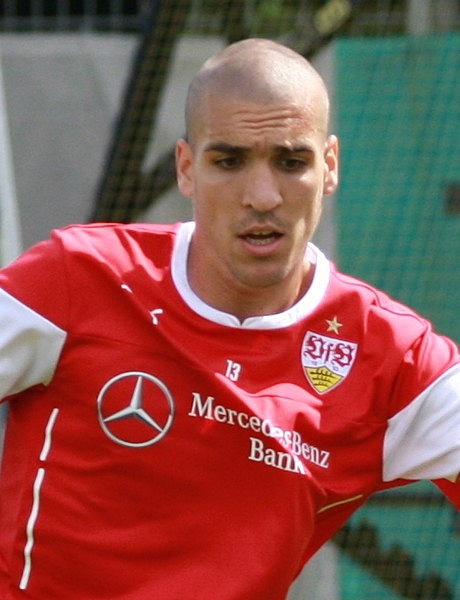
- Romeu playing for VfB Stuttgart in 2014

Personal information
- Full name: Oriol Romeu Vidal
- Date of birth: 24 September 1991 (age 35)
- Place of birth: Ulldecona, Spain
- Height: 1.83 m (6 ft 0 in)
- Position: Defensive midfielder

Team information
- Current team: Avispa Fukuoka
- Number: 21

Youth career
- 1996–2001: Ulldecona
- 2001–2004: Espanyol
- 2004–2008: Barcelona

Senior career*
Years	Team	Apps	(Gls)
2008–2011	Barcelona B	45	(1)
2010–2011	Barcelona	1	(0)
2011–2015	Chelsea	22	(0)
2013–2014	→ Valencia (loan)	13	(0)
2014–2015	→ VfB Stuttgart (loan)	27	(0)
2015–2022	Southampton	217	(7)
2022–2023	Girona	33	(2)
2023–2025	Barcelona	28	(0)
2024–2025	→ Girona (loan)	25	(0)
2025–2026	Southampton	6	(0)
2026–	Avispa Fukuoka	1	(0)

International career
2007–2008	Spain U17	5	(0)
2009–2010	Spain U19	11	(1)
2009–2011	Spain U20	8	(0)
2011–2012	Spain U21	10	(0)
2012	Spain U23	5	(0)
2019–	Catalonia	4	(0)
Medal record
Men's football
Representing Spain
UEFA European Under-17 Championship
Winner	2008 Türkiye
- * Club domestic league appearances and goals as of 05:07, 21 September 2026 (UTC)

Oriol Romeu Vidal (Spanish pronunciation: [oˈɾjol roˈmew]; born 24 September 1991) is a Spanish professional footballer who plays as a defensive midfielder for J1 League club Avispa Fukuoka.

Romeu began his career at Barcelona, playing mainly in their reserves at Barcelona B. In 2011, he joined Chelsea for €5 million, spending time on loan at Valencia and VfB Stuttgart before moving to Southampton four years later. He played 256 times for Southampton during his first spell with the club. Romeu joined Girona in 2022 before returning to Barcelona in July 2023. He spent the 2024–25 season on loan at former club Girona. Romeu rejoined Southampton in November 2025. He joined Japanese club Avispa Fukuoka in July 2026.

Romeu represented Spain up to under-21 level, and was part of their under-17 team which won the 2008 European Championship. He also played for the country at the 2012 Olympics.

== Club career ==
=== Barcelona ===
Born in Ulldecona, Tarragona, Catalonia, Romeu started his career at his local side CF Ulldecona. He arrived in Barcelona's youth academy in 2004, from neighbours Espanyol, and progressed through the club's youth academy until breaking into the reserve team. Manager Pep Guardiola handed him his first appearance for the senior side in a friendly against Kuwaiti team Kazma SC, and subsequently included him in the squad for the 2009 FIFA Club World Cup which took place in Abu Dhabi.

Romeu was included in the nineteen-man Barcelona squad on 13 August 2010, due to the need to rest some of Barcelona's Spanish internationals. He was to face Sevilla in the first leg of the season's Spanish Supercup. He made his official competitive debut in that game, playing the full ninety minutes in the 1–3 away loss.

Romeu made his first La Liga appearance on 15 May 2011, playing the last ten minutes of a 0–0 home draw against Deportivo La Coruña in the place of another club youth graduate, Jonathan dos Santos.

=== Chelsea ===
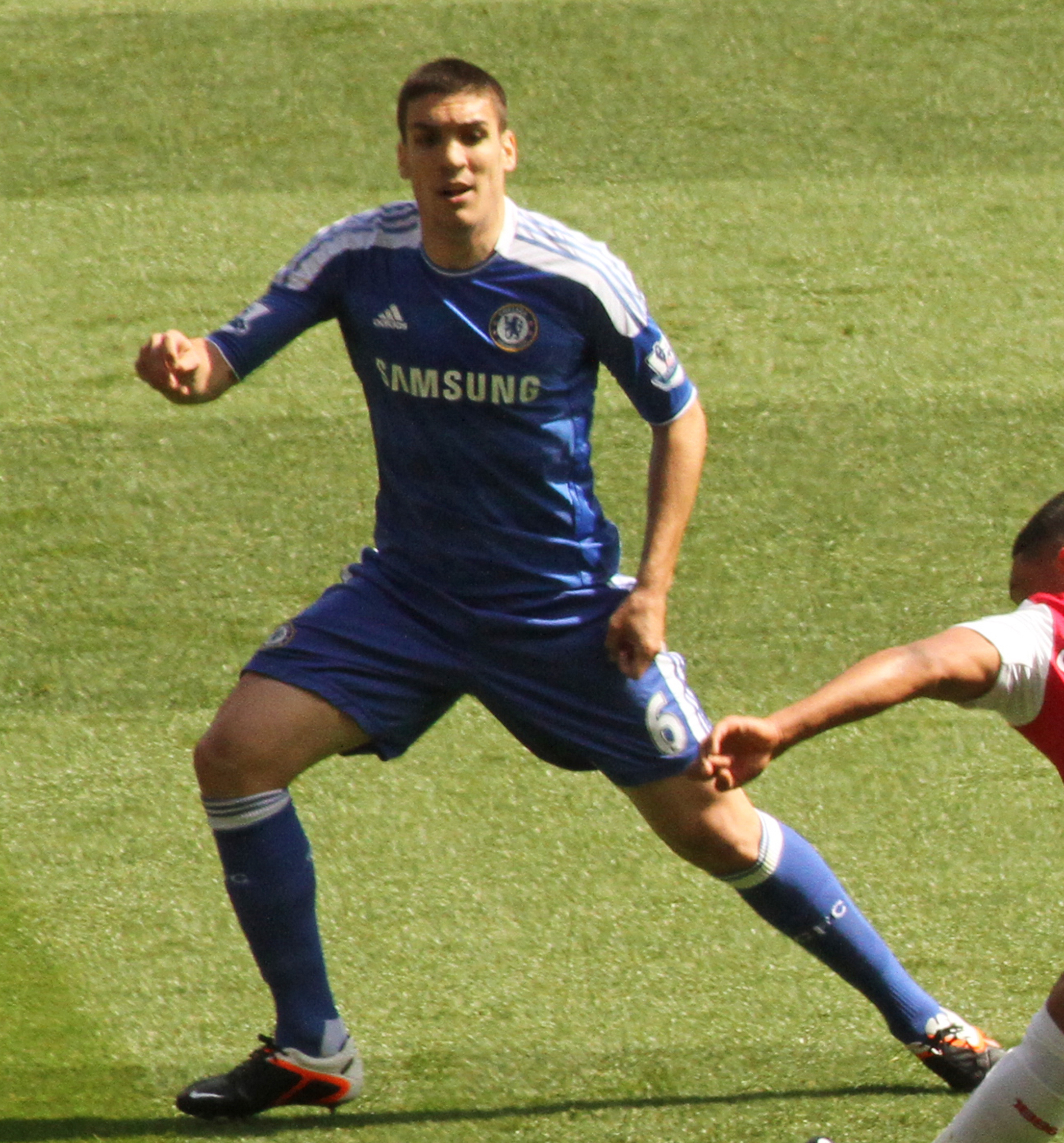
Romeu playing for Chelsea in 2012

Reports began to link Romeu with a move to Chelsea on 22 July 2011. The following day he agreed terms for his transfer, pending a medical or personal terms as he was away on international duty at the 2011 FIFA U-20 World Cup. On 4 August the English club announced the completion of the transfer, with the player signing a four-year contract in a deal worth €5 million – the deal also gave Barcelona first refusal via a buy back option should Chelsea deem him surplus to requirements, seeing Barcelona pay €10 million in 2012 or €15 million in 2013 to bring him back to the Camp Nou; he was given the number 6 shirt for the new campaign.

Romeu made his official debut for Chelsea on 10 September 2011, being brought on as a substitute in the 79th minute of the 2–1 away win against Sunderland. He received his first start on the 21st, in a 0–0 draw (penalty shootout win) against Fulham for the season's Football League Cup.

Romeu's first UEFA Champions League appearance came on 19 October 2011, playing the full 90 minutes in a 5–0 group stage home win against Genk. His first start in the Premier League was against Wolverhampton Wanderers on 26 November, putting in a solid performance in a 3–0 home win.

In December 2011, Chelsea issued a statement regarding the deal surrounding Romeu's buy back clause with Barcelona. The statement highlighted that the Blaugrana did not have an automatic buy back clause as first suggested, only having first refusal on any deal if the Blues wanted to sell him in the future.

On 25 September 2012, Romeu scored his first goal for Chelsea, taking a penalty in a 6–0 win against Wolves at Stamford Bridge in the League Cup. Manager Roberto Di Matteo stated that the departures of Yossi Benayoun, Michael Essien and Raul Meireles would mean more playing opportunities for the Spaniard; however, on 11 December, he suffered a knee injury in a game against Sunderland, being sidelined for the rest of the season.

==== Loans to Valencia and Stuttgart ====
On 12 July 2013, Romeu returned to Spain and joined Valencia in a season-long loan deal. He made his debut for the club on 15 September, in a 3–1 defeat at Real Betis. In February, during training Romeu suffered another knee injury that kept him out of action for a month. During his time with Valencia, Romeu played 18 games.

On 17 July 2014, Romeu signed a new contract with Chelsea, keeping him at the club until 2017. On 4 August, however, he was loaned to VfB Stuttgart in Germany. He made his debut twenty days later in a 1–1 draw at Borussia Mönchengladbach.

=== Southampton ===
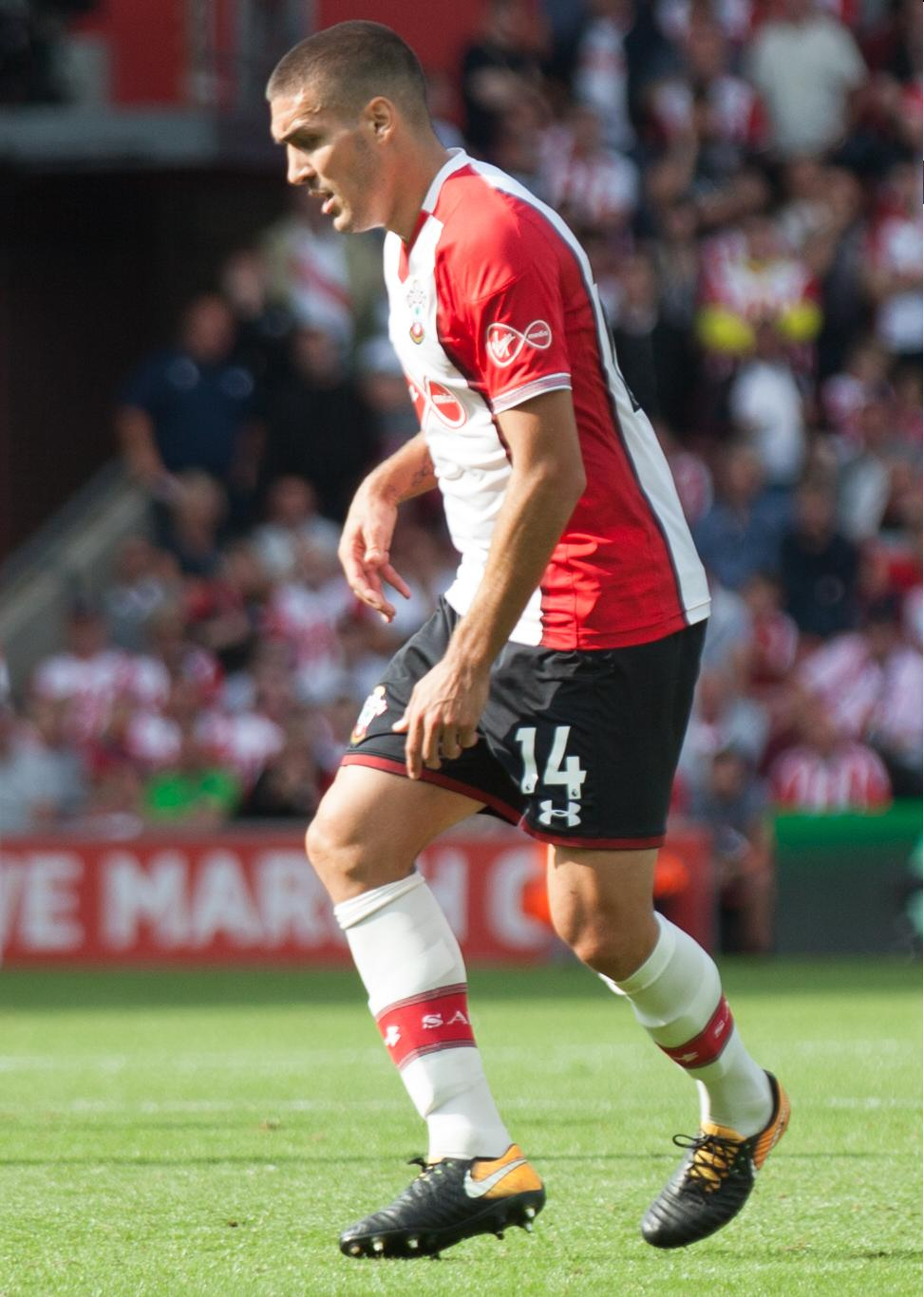
Romeu playing for Southampton in 2017

On 13 August 2015, Romeu joined Southampton for £5 million on a three-year deal. He made his debut two days later, as a half-time substitute for Dušan Tadić in a 3–0 home defeat to Everton, earning a booking after three minutes for a foul on James McCarthy. He scored his first goal for the Saints – and first in a professional league – on 5 December, equalising for a 1–1 draw against Aston Villa at St Mary's Stadium.

After missing only one league game all season for Claude Puel's Saints, Romeu signed a new four-and-a-half-year deal on 24 January 2017. Puel compared Romeu to Chelsea player N'Golo Kanté. He was voted the club's Player of the Season, at the end of a campaign that saw them reach the EFL Cup Final.

In November 2020, Romeu signed a new contract to keep him at Southampton until the summer of 2023. On 23 February 2021, talkSPORT commentator Mark Wilson stated that Romeu produced "one of the greatest tackles of all time" after he made up a serious amount of ground to prevent Leeds United forward Raphinha from scoring, but the game ended in a 3–0 defeat. In the same game, he picked up an ankle injury and required surgery, which was expected to see him miss the remainder of the season. However, he was able to make an appearance on the final day of the 2020–21 season, replacing Kyle Walker-Peters in Southampton’s 3–0 defeat to West Ham United.

=== Girona ===
On 1 September 2022, Romeu completed a permanent transfer to Girona. Later that month, on 9 September, he scored his first La Liga goal, securing a 2–1 victory over Real Valladolid.

=== Return to Barcelona ===
On 19 July 2023, Romeu returned to his former club, Barcelona, on a three-year contract. He made his second debut for the club on 13 August in a 0–0 draw with Getafe.

On 5 August 2024, Romeu rejoined Girona on a season-long loan deal. On the expiry of the loan, his contract with Barcelona was terminated by mutual agreement.

=== Return to Southampton ===
On 6 November 2025, Romeu returned to his former club, Southampton, on a contract until the end of the season. He made his second debut for the club on 29 November in a 3–2 defeat against Millwall after he replaced Cam Bragg in the 76th minute. Following the conclusion of the 2025–26 season, Romeu was released from the club.

=== Avispa Fukuoka ===
On 13 July 2026, Romeu signed with J1 League club, Avispa Fukuoka, after being a free agent.

== International career ==
Romeu participated in the 2008 UEFA Under-17 Championship with Spain, playing four matches and helping his country to eventual victory in the tournament.

After making his professional début for Barcelona in 2009, Romeu became a mainstay in the under-19 and under-20 national teams, featuring heavily in the 2010 UEFA Under-19 Championship elite qualification round.

He was part of the Spanish squad which was eliminated from its group at the 2012 Olympics, coming on as a substitute in their first match and starting the last.

== Personal life ==
Romeu, who is known for his interest in literature, wrote an autobiography La temporada de mi vida, el viaje interior de un futbolista (The season of my life, the inside voyage of a footballer).

== Career statistics ==
As of match played 7 October 2026

Appearances and goals by club, season and competition
Club	Season	League			National cup (Note: Includes FA Cup, Copa del Rey, DFB-Pokal, Emperors Cup)		League cup (Note: Includes Football League/EFL Cup)		Europe		Other		Total	
Club	Season	Division	Apps	Goals	Apps	Goals	Apps	Goals	Apps	Goals	Apps	Goals	Apps	Goals
Barcelona B	2008–09	Segunda División B	5	0	—		—		—		—		5	0
Barcelona B	2009–10	Segunda División B	22	0	—		—		—		4 (Note: Appearances in Segunda División B play-offs)	0	26	0
Barcelona B	2010–11	Segunda División	18	1	—		—		—		—		18	1
Barcelona B	Total		45	1	0	0	—		—		4	0	49	1
Barcelona	2010–11	La Liga	1	0	0	0	—		0	0	1 (Note: Appearance in Supercopa de España)	0	2	0
Chelsea	2011–12	Premier League	16	0	2	0	3	0	3 (Note: Appearance(s) in UEFA Champions League)	0	—		24	0
Chelsea	2012–13	Premier League	6	0	0	0	2	1	1	0	0	0	9	1
Chelsea	Total		22	0	2	0	5	1	4	0	0	0	33	1
Valencia (loan)	2013–14	La Liga	13	0	1	0	—		4 (Note: Appearances in UEFA Europa League)	0	—		18	0
VfB Stuttgart (loan)	2014–15	Bundesliga	27	0	1	0	—		—		—		28	0
Southampton	2015–16	Premier League	29	1	1	1	3	0	2	0	—		35	2
Southampton	2016–17	Premier League	35	1	2	0	3	0	6	0	—		46	1
Southampton	2017–18	Premier League	34	1	5	0	1	0	—		—		40	1
Southampton	2018–19	Premier League	31	1	1	0	1	0	—		—		33	1
Southampton	2019–20	Premier League	30	0	2	0	3	0	—		—		35	0
Southampton	2020–21	Premier League	21	1	1	0	1	0	—		—		23	1
Southampton	2021–22	Premier League	36	2	4	0	2	0	—		—		42	2
Southampton	2022–23	Premier League	1	0	—		1	0	—		—		2	0
Southampton	Total		217	7	16	1	15	0	8	0	—		256	8
Girona	2022–23	La Liga	33	2	1	0	—		—		—		34	2
Barcelona	2023–24	La Liga	28	0	2	0	—		7	0	0	0	37	0
Girona (loan)	2024–25	La Liga	25	0	0	0	—		6	0	—		31	0
Southampton	2025–26	Championship	6	0	1	0	—		—		0	0	7	0
Avispa Fukuoka	2026–27	J1 League	1	0	2	0	0	0	—		—		3	0
Career total			419	10	26	1	20	1	29	0	5	0	499	12

== Honours ==
Barcelona

- La Liga: 2010–11
- Supercopa de España: 2010

Chelsea

- FA Cup: 2011–12
- UEFA Champions League: 2011–12

Southampton

- EFL Cup runner-up: 2016–17

Spain U17

- UEFA European Under-17 Championship: 2008

Spain U19

- UEFA European Under-19 Championship runner-up: 2010

Individual

- Southampton Player of the Season: 2016–17
