= Manolo Gabbiadini =

Italian footballer

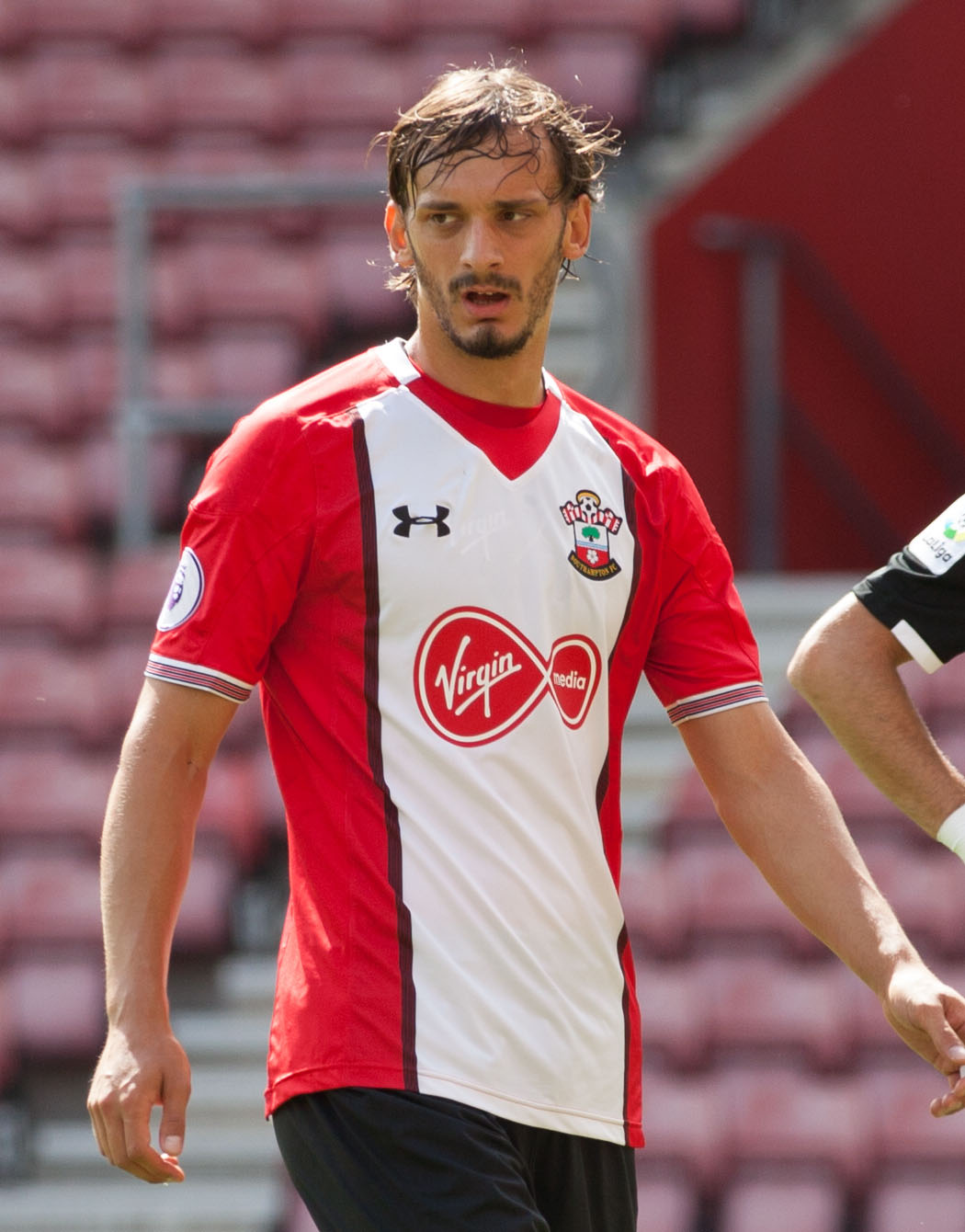
- Gabbiadini with Southampton in 2017

Personal information
- Full name: Manolo Gabbiadini
- Date of birth: 26 November 1991 (age 34)
- Place of birth: Calcinate, Italy
- Height: 1.86 m (6 ft 1 in)
- Position: Forward

Youth career
- 2003–2010: Atalanta
- 2006–2007: → Palazzolo (loan)
- 2007–2008: → Montichiari (loan)

Senior career*
Years	Team	Apps	(Gls)
2009–2012	Atalanta	25	(1)
2010–2011	→ Cittadella (loan)	27	(5)
2012–2013	Juventus	0	(0)
2012–2013	→ Bologna (loan)	30	(6)
2013–2015	Sampdoria	47	(15)
2015–2017	Napoli	56	(16)
2017–2019	Southampton	51	(10)
2019–2023	Sampdoria	120	(31)
2023–2025	Al-Nasr	35	(14)
Total		391	(98)

International career
2010	Italy U20	3	(2)
2010–2013	Italy U21	24	(12)
2012–2022	Italy	13	(2)
- * Club domestic league appearances and goals

Manolo Gabbiadini (Italian pronunciation: [maˈnɔːlo ɡabbjaˈdiːni]; born 26 November 1991) is an Italian former professional footballer who played as a forward.

Gabbiadini began his professional career with Atalanta, where he made his Serie A debut in 2010. After a one-year stint at Cittadella between 2010 and 2011, he returned to Atalanta, before moving to Bologna in 2012. The following year, Gabbiadini joined Sampdoria, where he scored a personal best of ten goals in the Italian top flight. In 2015, he was sold to Napoli, before moving to Southampton during the 2017 January transfer window. Gabbiadini returned to Sampdoria in 2019. He moved to Al-Nasr in 2023.

Having represented Italy internationally at under-20 and under-21 levels, Gabbiadini made his senior debut in 2012.

== Club career ==
=== Atalanta ===
Born in the province of Bergamo, he grew up in the youth teams of Bolgare and then Atalanta, who loaned him to Palazzolo and Montichiari, before returning to Bergamo. He made his Serie A debut for the club on 14 March 2010 in a league match against Parma, coming on as a 79th-minute substitute for Simone Tiribocchi. Following his debut, Gabbiadini made one further appearance for the club during the 2009–10 Serie A campaign.

==== Loan to Cittadella and return to Atalanta ====
On 9 July 2010, Gabbiadini joined Serie B side Cittadella, along with Daniele Gasparetto, in co-ownership deal for a peppercorn of €500, as part of the negotiation that saw Atalanta sign Matteo Ardemagni. He scored five goals in 27 appearances, including 15 starts, during the 2010–11 Serie B season.

On 21 June 2011, Gabbiadini returned to Atalanta after his co-ownership deal was resolved for €1.5 million for 50 percent of his registration rights. During the 2011–12 Serie A campaign, Gabbiadini was fully integrated into the club's first team. He made 25 league appearances for the club, including eight starts, and scored his first Serie A goal on 25 March 2012 in the 2–0 home victory over Bologna. He also scored in his lone 2011–12 Coppa Italia appearance for La Dea.

=== Juventus ===
On 24 August 2012, Juventus officially signed Gabbiadini in a new co-ownership agreement for €5.5 million, however it involved €3.5 million cash along with the co-ownership of James Troisi's contract, which was valued at €2 million. Troisi was a free agent just two days prior to the deal, but signed by Juventus for the sole purpose of this negotiation.

==== Loan to Bologna ====
Immediately following his transfer to the city of Turin, Gabbiadini was loaned to fellow Serie A side Bologna on a season-long loan deal. The loan deal was not confirmed until the final week of the 2012 summer transfer window, though Gabbiadini previously trained with Bologna days before the deal was officially finalized.

He enjoyed a productive year at Bologna, scoring seven goals in 31 appearances during the 2012–13 Serie A season. On 19 June 2013, at the end of the campaign, the co-ownership agreement between Atalanta and Juventus was renewed, with the player's registration rights remaining with Juventus.

=== Sampdoria ===
On 9 July 2013, Sampdoria acquired the 50 percent registration rights of Gabbiadini from Atalanta for €5.5 million, with Juventus retained the remaining 50 percent registration rights. Gabbiadini would spend the 2013–14 Serie A for the Ligurian club. In his first season with the Blucerchiati, he scored ten goals, a personal best, in 35 appearances.

=== Napoli ===
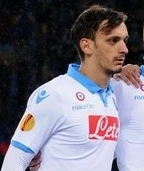
Gabbiadini with Napoli in 2015.

In January 2015, Gabbiadini joined Napoli for a reported fee of €13 million, to be split equally between Sampdoria and Juventus, each owning 50 percent of the player at the time of the deal. (Juventus later declared that their revenue was €6.25 million). He made his debut on 11 January against former team Juventus at the Stadio San Paolo, replacing José Callejón for the last 17 minutes of a 3–1 defeat. His first goal for the team came on 1 February, the winner in a 2–1 victory away to Chievo from Ivan Strinić's assist. On 19 March 2016, he scored a first-half brace in a 6–0 victory over Bologna.

=== Southampton ===
On 31 January 2017, Gabbiadini signed a four-and-a-half-year contract with Southampton. The transfer fee paid was reported to be in the region of £14 million to £15 million depending on the source, although the club did not officially disclose the transfer fee. On 4 February 2017, he scored his first goal for the club on his debut in the Premier League in a 1–3 loss to West Ham.

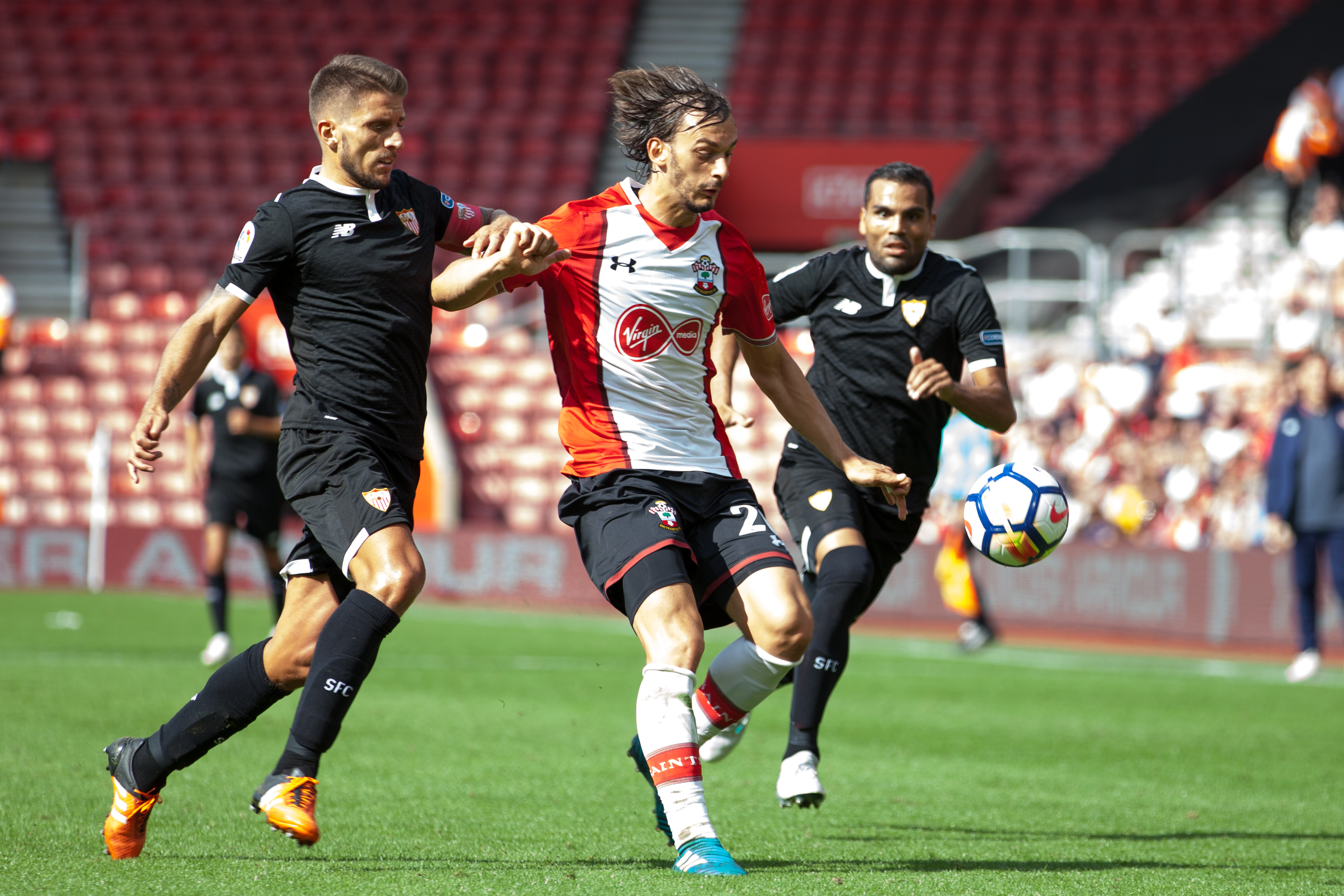
Gabbiadini in August 2017 during pre-season friendly against Sevilla

He started his second game for Southampton on 11 February and scored twice inside the first 45 minutes in Southampton's 4–0 win at Sunderland. He scored two more goals in his next match (and had a further goal disallowed incorrectly for offside), in the 2017 EFL Cup Final on 26 February, in a 3–2 defeat by Manchester United to bring his goal-scoring tally to five in his first three matches for Southampton. With his goal in the next match, a 4–3 win at Watford on 4 March, Gabbiadini became the first Saints player to score in each of his first four matches for the club. His performances for Southampton throughout the February period saw him awarded the Premier League's PFA Fans’ Player of the Month award.

=== Return to Sampdoria ===
On 11 January 2019, Gabbiadini returned to Italy and signed with former club Sampdoria, for a reported fee of £12 million.

=== Al-Nasr ===
On 29 July 2023, Gabbiadini signed for UAE Pro League club Al-Nasr. On 26 December 2025, after spending two-and-a-half years representing the Emirati side, scoring 17 goals in 45 appearances, his contract was terminated by mutual agreement. He retired from professional football following his departure, with Gabbiadini stating that the last two years of his career was tough due to injuries.

== International career ==
=== Youth ===
On 17 November 2010, Gabbiadini made his debut with the Italian under-21 squad in a friendly game against Turkey. On 29 March 2011, he scored his first goal for the U21 team in a friendly game against Germany. On 6 October 2011, he scored a hat trick in the away match won 7–2 against Liechtenstein. He took part at the 2013 UEFA European Under-21 Championships in Israel, scoring two goals against hosts Israel in the group stage, as Italy went on to reach the final, only to lose to Spain.

=== Senior ===
On 15 August 2012, Gabbiadini made his debut with the Italian senior team, playing in the second half of the friendly match against England in Bern, which Italy lost 2–1. On 17 November 2015, he came off the bench to score his first international goal for Italy in the 66th minute of a 2–2 friendly home draw against Romania, in Bologna, although he was forced off early after sustaining an injury.

== Style of play ==
Gabbiadini is a versatile and a well-rounded forward who can play several offensive positions, either in the centre as a striker, as a supporting forward, as an attacking midfielder, or as a winger on either flank. His preferred role is on the right, however, where he is capable of cutting into the middle and curling shots on goal with his stronger left foot, rather than looking to deliver crosses into the area from the touchline.

A player with tactical awareness, he possesses pace, as well as positional sense and offensive movement, which allow him to play between the lines, or take advantage of openings and spaces by making attacking runs into good areas in which he can receive the ball. He also possesses good control, quick feet, and technical skills, which, along with his strength, enable him to retain possession when playing with his back to goal and hold up the ball for teammates.

Gabbiadini is capable both of creating and scoring goals due to his intelligence, link-up play, and his powerful and accurate shot with his left foot, in particular from outside the penalty area; he is also an accurate set-piece taker. In spite of his height and physique, he is not particularly strong in the air.

== Personal life ==
Gabbiadini's older sister Melania is also a forward, who has spent most of her career with AGSM Verona and plays internationally for the Italy women's national football team. He has mentioned her as a formative influence. On 17 June 2017, Gabbiadini married his long-term partner Martina Rubini in the parish church of Sasso Marconi, Bologna.

== Career statistics ==
=== Club ===
Appearances and goals by club, season and competition
Club	Season	League			National cup (Note: Includes Coppa Italia, FA Cup, UAE President's Cup)		League cup (Note: Includes EFL Cup, UAE League Cup)		Continental		Other		Total	
Club	Season	Division	Apps	Goals	Apps	Goals	Apps	Goals	Apps	Goals	Apps	Goals	Apps	Goals
Atalanta	2009–10	Serie A	2	0	0	0	—		—		—		2	0
Atalanta	2011–12	Serie A	23	1	1	1	—		—		—		24	2
Atalanta	Total		25	1	1	1	—		—		—		26	2
Cittadella (loan)	2010–11	Serie B	27	5	2	0	—		—		—		29	5
Bologna (loan)	2012–13	Serie A	30	6	1	1	—		—		—		31	7
Sampdoria	2013–14	Serie A	34	8	1	2	—		—		—		35	10
Sampdoria	2014–15	Serie A	13	7	2	2	—		—		—		15	9
Sampdoria	Total		47	15	3	4	—		—		—		50	19
Napoli	2014–15	Serie A	20	8	4	1	—		6 (Note: Appearances in UEFA Europa League)	2	—		30	11
Napoli	2015–16	Serie A	23	5	1	0	—		6	4	—		30	9
Napoli	2016–17	Serie A	13	3	1	1	—		5 (Note: Appearances in UEFA Champions League)	1	—		19	5
Napoli	Total		56	16	6	2	—		17	7	—		79	25
Southampton	2016–17	Premier League	11	4	0	0	1	2	—		—		12	6
Southampton	2017–18	Premier League	28	5	4	0	1	0	—		—		33	5
Southampton	2018–19	Premier League	12	1	0	0	3	0	—		—		15	1
Southampton	Total		51	10	4	0	5	2	—		—		60	12
Sampdoria	2018–19	Serie A	18	4	0	0	—		—		—		18	4
Sampdoria	2019–20	Serie A	33	11	2	1	—		—		—		35	12
Sampdoria	2020–21	Serie A	16	3	1	0	—		—		—		17	3
Sampdoria	2021–22	Serie A	18	6	3	1	—		—		—		21	7
Sampdoria	2022–23	Serie A	35	7	1	0	—		—		—		36	7
Sampdoria	Total		120	31	7	2	—		—		—		127	33
Al-Nasr	2023–24	UAE Pro League	22	11	2	0	3	3	—		—		27	14
Al-Nasr	2024–25	UAE Pro League	11	3	1	0	2	0	—		3 (Note: Appearances in AGCFF Gulf Club Champions League)	0	17	3
Al-Nasr	2025–26	UAE Pro League	2	0	0	0	1	0	0	0	0	0	3	0
Al-Nasr	Total		35	14	3	0	6	3	—		3	0	47	17
Career total			391	98	27	10	11	5	17	7	3	0	449	120

=== International ===
Appearances and goals by national team and year
National team	Year	Apps	Goals
Italy	2012	1	0
Italy	2013	0	0
Italy	2014	1	0
Italy	2015	4	1
Italy	2016	0	0
Italy	2017	5	1
Italy	2022	2	0
Total		13	2

Scores and results list Italy's goal tally first.

List of international goals scored by Manolo Gabbiadini
No.	Date	Venue	Opponent	Score	Result	Competition
1	17 November 2015	Stadio Renato Dall'Ara, Bologna, Italy	Romania	2–1	2–2	Friendly
2	11 June 2017	Stadio Friuli, Udine, Italy	Liechtenstein	5–0	5–0	2018 FIFA World Cup qualification

== Honours ==
Southampton

- EFL Cup runner-up: 2016–17

Individual

- Premier League PFA Fans’ Player of the Month: February 2017
