= 2017 EFL Cup final =

- Match programme cover
- Event: 2016–17 EFL Cup
Manchester United	Southampton
3	2
- Date: 26 February 2017
- Venue: Wembley Stadium, London
- Man of the Match: Zlatan Ibrahimović (Manchester United)
- Referee: Andre Marriner (Birmingham)
- Attendance: 85,264

The 2017 EFL Cup final was the final association football match of the 2016–17 EFL Cup that took place on 26 February 2017 between Manchester United and Southampton at Wembley Stadium in London, England. The final was the first League Cup final contested under the "EFL Cup" name following the renaming of The Football League to the English Football League (EFL). As winners, Manchester United initially qualified for the third qualifying round of the 2017–18 UEFA Europa League, but entered the group stage of the 2017–18 UEFA Champions League instead by virtue of their 2016–17 UEFA Europa League victory, passing the League Cup berth to the highest-placed Premier League team who had not already qualified for Europe, seventh-placed Everton.

The match was Manchester United's ninth final in the League Cup, having won in their last three appearances and four overall, and Southampton's second, having lost their only other League Cup final in 1979. It was the second cup final played between the two sides, following the 1976 FA Cup final, when Southampton – then of the Second Division – beat First Division Manchester United 1–0.

== Route to the final ==
=== Manchester United ===
Round	Opposition	Score
3	Northampton Town (A)	3–1
4	Manchester City (H)	1–0
5	West Ham United (H)	4–1
SF	Hull City (H)	2–0
SF	Hull City (A)	1–2
Key: (H) = Home venue; (A) = Away venue.

Manchester United, as a Premier League club involved in the 2016–17 UEFA Europa League, started the competition in the third round where they were drawn away at EFL League One team Northampton Town. At Sixfields Stadium Manchester United won 3–1 with goals from Michael Carrick, Ander Herrera and Marcus Rashford. In the fourth round they were drawn against Manchester rivals Manchester City at home. At Old Trafford, Manchester United won 1–0 due to a goal from Juan Mata. In the quarter-final they drew fellow Premier League team West Ham United at Old Trafford, where they progressed 4–1 due to two goals each from Zlatan Ibrahimović and Anthony Martial despite manager José Mourinho serving a touchline ban.

In the two legged semi-final, they drew fellow Premier League Hull City. Manchester United won the first leg at Old Trafford 2–0 due to goals from Mata and Marouane Fellaini and lost the second leg 2–1 at the KCOM Stadium despite a Paul Pogba goal but progressed to the final 3–2 on aggregate.

=== Southampton ===
Round	Opposition	Score
3	Crystal Palace (H)	2–0
4	Sunderland (H)	1–0
5	Arsenal (A)	2–0
SF	Liverpool (H)	1–0
SF	Liverpool (A)	1–0
Key: (H) = Home venue; (A) = Away venue.

Southampton, as a Premier League team involved in the 2016–17 UEFA Europa League, started the competition in the third round. They were drawn against fellow Premier League team Crystal Palace at home. At St Mary's Stadium, they won 2–0 with goals from Charlie Austin and Jake Hesketh. In the next round they drew Premier League Sunderland at home. At St Mary's Stadium, they won 1–0 due to a goal from Sofiane Boufal. In the quarter final they were drawn away at Premier League Arsenal. At the Emirates Stadium, Southampton won 2–0 with goals from Jordy Clasie and Ryan Bertrand.

In the two-legged semi final, Southampton drew fellow Premier League Liverpool. Southampton won the first leg 1–0 due to a goal from Nathan Redmond and won 1–0 away at Anfield with a goal from Shane Long to progress to the final 2–0 on aggregate. Southampton are the second team to reach a League Cup final without conceding any goals, after Tottenham Hotspur managed the feat in 1982. This would be their first major final since the 2003 FA Cup final. Southampton fans celebrated reaching the final by painting white stripes on Royal Mail red pillar boxes, mirroring the 2012 Olympic gold post box campaign, though Royal Mail viewed this as vandalism and said that they would restore the pillar boxes to their original colour.

== Match ==
=== Summary ===
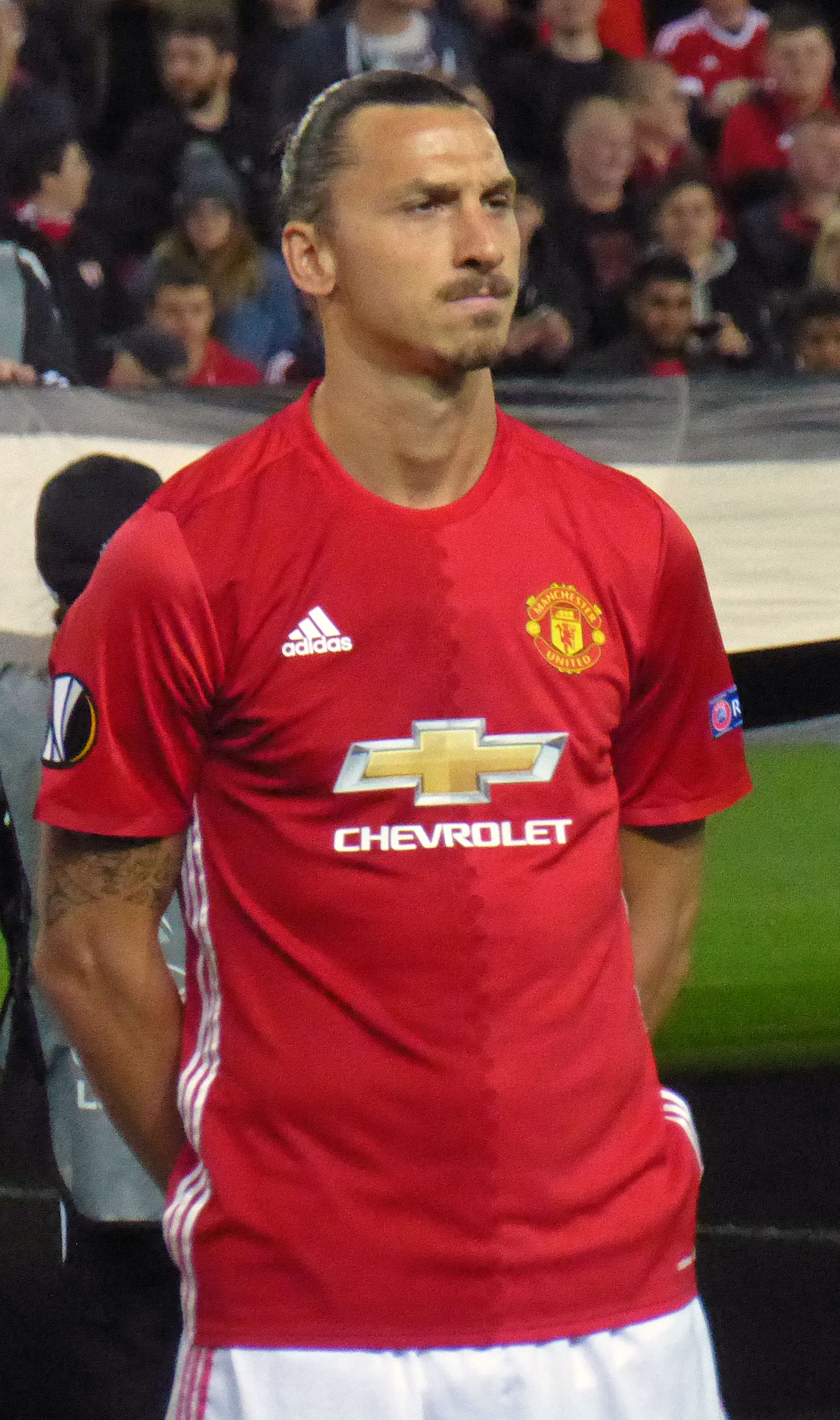
Zlatan Ibrahimović scored two goals and was named man of the match

Manolo Gabbiadini had the ball in the net early in the game after a low cross from the right by Cédric, but the goal was controversially disallowed for offside. Zlatan Ibrahimović opened the scoring in the 19th minute, with a free kick to the left of Southampton goalkeeper Fraser Forster awarded following a foul by Oriol Romeu on Ander Herrera. Despite the Saints enjoying a spell of pressure on the United goal, Jesse Lingard doubled the lead in the 38th minute with a low right foot shot to the right corner of the net from just inside the penalty area. Gabbiadini brought Southampton back into the game on the stroke of half-time, converting James Ward-Prowse's cross from the right from three yards out.

After the break, Gabbiadini equalised for the Saints when he flicked the ball low into the net with his left foot, it was his fifth goal in his first three games, as the Saints continued to dominate possession and chances on goal. The Saints continued having chances to take the lead throughout the second half, as Dušan Tadić and Ward-Prowse saw efforts saved by United goalkeeper David de Gea, and Oriol Romeu hit the post with a header from a corner, but with three minutes remaining Ibrahimović scored his second with a close range header after a cross from Ander Herrera on the right.

=== Details ===
26 February 2017
16:30 GMT

Manchester United	3–2	Southampton
Ibrahimović 19', 87'; Lingard 38'	Report	Gabbiadini 45+1', 48'

Wembley Stadium, London
Attendance: 85,264
Referee: Andre Marriner (West Midlands)

Manchester United	Southampton

GK	1	(Spain) David de Gea
RB	25	(Ecuador) Antonio Valencia
CB	3	(Ivory Coast) Eric Bailly
CB	12	(England) Chris Smalling (c)
LB	5	(Argentina) Marcos Rojo
CM	21	(Spain) Ander Herrera	(yellow card) 24'
CM	6	(France) Paul Pogba
RW	8	(Spain) Juan Mata		(substituted off) 46'
AM	14	(England) Jesse Lingard	(yellow card) 41'	(substituted off) 77'
LW	11	(France) Anthony Martial		(substituted off) 90'
CF	9	(Sweden) Zlatan Ibrahimović
Substitutes:
GK	20	(Argentina) Sergio Romero
DF	17	(Netherlands) Daley Blind
MF	16	(England) Michael Carrick		(substituted on) 46'
MF	18	(England) Ashley Young
MF	27	(Belgium) Marouane Fellaini		(substituted on) 90'
FW	10	(England) Wayne Rooney
FW	19	(England) Marcus Rashford		(substituted on) 77'
Manager:
(Portugal) José Mourinho

GK	1	(England) Fraser Forster
RB	2	(Portugal) Cédric
CB	24	(England) Jack Stephens	(yellow card) 40'
CB	3	(Japan) Maya Yoshida
LB	21	(England) Ryan Bertrand
RM	16	(England) James Ward-Prowse
CM	14	(Spain) Oriol Romeu	(yellow card) 18'
CM	8	(Northern Ireland) Steven Davis (c)		(substituted off) 90'
LM	22	(England) Nathan Redmond	(yellow card) 56'
SS	11	(Serbia) Dušan Tadić		(substituted off) 77'
CF	20	(Italy) Manolo Gabbiadini		(substituted off) 83'
Substitutes:
GK	40	(France) Mouez Hassen
DF	12	(Uruguay) Martín Cáceres
DF	38	(England) Sam McQueen
MF	19	(Morocco) Sofiane Boufal		(substituted on) 77'
MF	23	(Denmark) Pierre-Emile Højbjerg
FW	7	(Republic of Ireland) Shane Long		(substituted on) 83'
FW	9	(England) Jay Rodriguez		(substituted on) 90'
Manager:
(France) Claude Puel

Man of the Match:
Zlatan Ibrahimović (Manchester United)

Assistant referees:
Richard West (East Yorkshire)
Stuart Burt (Northamptonshire)
Fourth official:
Kevin Friend (Leicestershire)
Fifth official:
Matthew Wilkes (West Midlands)

Match rules

- 90 minutes
- 30 minutes of extra time if necessary
- Penalty shoot-out if scores still level
- Seven named substitutes, of which up to three may be used

== See also ==
- 2017 FA Cup final
