= Mouez Hassen =

Footballer (born 1995)

Personal information
- Full name: Mouez Hassen
- Date of birth: 5 March 1995 (age 31)
- Place of birth: Fréjus, France
- Height: 1.86 m (6 ft 1 in)
- Position: Goalkeeper

Team information
- Current team: Red Star
- Number: 40

Youth career
- 2005–2009: Stade Raphaëlois
- 2009–2010: Fréjus
- 2010–2013: Nice

Senior career*
| Years | Team | Apps | (Gls) |
| 2012–2019 | Nice B | 36 | (0) |
| 2013–2019 | Nice | 49 | (0) |
| 2017 | → Southampton (loan) | 0 | (0) |
| 2017–2018 | → Châteauroux (loan) | 29 | (0) |
| 2019–2020 | Cercle Brugge | 4 | (0) |
| 2020–2021 | Brest | 0 | (0) |
| 2021–2025 | Club Africain | 73 | (0) |
| 2025– | Red Star | 0 | (0) |

International career
| 2011 | France U16 | 2 | (0) |
| 2011–2012 | France U17 | 2 | (0) |
| 2013 | France U18 | 1 | (0) |
| 2013 | France U19 | 2 | (0) |
| 2014 | France U20 | 2 | (0) |
| 2015 | France U21 | 5 | (0) |
| 2018–2024 | Tunisia | 21 | (0) |
Medal record
Representing Tunisia
Men's football
FIFA Arab Cup
| Runner-up | 2021 Qatar |
- * Club domestic league appearances and goals as of 00.05, 2 October 2024 (UTC)

Mouez Hassen (Arabic: مُعِزّ حَسَن; born 5 March 1995) is a professional footballer who plays as a goalkeeper for Ligue 2 club Red Star. Born in France, he played for the Tunisia national team.

== Early life ==
Hassen was born in Fréjus, Var.

== Club career ==
=== Nice ===
Hassen made his Ligue 1 debut on 25 September 2013 in a 2–0 away defeat against FC Nantes.

=== Southampton ===
On 31 January 2017, Hassen signed a five-month loan deal with Southampton, where he was re-united with his former manager, Claude Puel, although he made no appearances for the club.

=== Châteauroux ===
Hassen joined Châteauroux on loan on 9 July 2017.

=== Cercle Brugge ===
On 1 November 2019, Hassen signed a one-season contract with a one-season extension option with Belgian First Division A club Cercle Brugge.

=== Club Africain ===
On 9 September 2021 he joined Tunisian club Club Africain.

== International career ==
Hassen made his debut for Tunisia keeping a clean sheet in an international friendly against Costa Rica on 27 March 2018 at the Allianz Riviera in Nice.

In June 2018, it was revealed that Hassen had faked being injured during two international friendly matches against Portugal and Turkey to allow teammates to eat food mid-game and break their fast during the month of Ramadan.

In June 2018, he was named in Tunisia's 23-man squad for the 2018 FIFA World Cup in Russia.

== Career statistics ==
=== Club ===
As of match played 26 June 2024

Appearances and goals by club, season and competition
| Club | Season | League | | | National cup | | League cup | | Continental | | Other | | Total | |
| Club | Season | Division | Apps | Goals | Apps | Goals | Apps | Goals | Apps | Goals | Apps | Goals | Apps | Goals |
|---|---|---|---|---|---|---|---|---|---|---|---|---|---|---|
| Nice B | 2012–13 | CFA 2 | 21 | 0 | — | | — | | — | | — | | 21 | 0 |
| Nice B | 2013–14 | CFA | 6 | 0 | — | | — | | — | | — | | 6 | 0 |
| Nice B | 2014–15 | CFA | 2 | 0 | — | | — | | — | | — | | 2 | 0 |
| Nice B | 2015–16 | CFA | 1 | 0 | — | | — | | — | | — | | 1 | 0 |
| Nice B | 2016–17 | CFA | 1 | 0 | — | | — | | — | | — | | 1 | 0 |
| Nice B | 2018–19 | National 2 | 5 | 0 | — | | — | | — | | — | | 5 | 0 |
| Nice B | Total | | 36 | 0 | — | | — | | — | | — | | 36 | 0 |
| Nice | 2012–13 | Ligue 1 | 0 | 0 | 0 | 0 | 0 | 0 | — | | — | | 0 | 0 |
| Nice | 2013–14 | Ligue 1 | 5 | 0 | 2 | 0 | 0 | 0 | — | | — | | 7 | 0 |
| Nice | 2014–15 | Ligue 1 | 30 | 0 | 1 | 0 | 0 | 0 | — | | — | | 31 | 0 |
| Nice | 2015–16 | Ligue 1 | 14 | 0 | 1 | 0 | 1 | 0 | — | | — | | 16 | 0 |
| Nice | 2016–17 | Ligue 1 | 0 | 0 | 0 | 0 | 0 | 0 | — | | — | | 0 | 0 |
| Nice | Total | | 49 | 0 | 4 | 0 | 1 | 0 | — | | — | | 54 | 0 |
| Southampton (loan) | 2016–17 | Premier League | 0 | 0 | 0 | 0 | 0 | 0 | — | | — | | 0 | 0 |
| Châteauroux (loan) | 2017–18 | Ligue 2 | 29 | 0 | 0 | 0 | 1 | 0 | — | | — | | 30 | 0 |
| Cercle Brugge | 2019–20 | Belgian First Division A | 4 | 0 | 0 | 0 | — | | — | | — | | 4 | 0 |
| Brest | 2020–21 | Ligue 1 | 0 | 0 | 0 | 0 | — | | — | | — | | 0 | 0 |
| Club Africain | 2021–22 | Tunisian Ligue Professionnelle 1 | 17 | 0 | 0 | 0 | — | | — | | — | | 17 | 0 |
| Club Africain | 2022–23 | Tunisian Ligue Professionnelle 1 | 23 | 0 | 3 | 0 | — | | 4 | 0 | — | | 30 | 0 |
| Club Africain | 2023–24 | Tunisian Ligue Professionnelle 1 | 18 | 0 | 4 | 0 | — | | 8 | 0 | — | | 30 | 0 |
| Club Africain | Total | | 58 | 0 | 7 | 0 | — | | 12 | 0 | — | | 77 | 0 |
| Career total | | | 176 | 0 | 11 | 0 | 2 | 0 | 12 | 0 | 0 | 0 | 201 | 0 |

=== International ===
As of match played 17 October 2023

Appearances and goals by national team and year
| National team | Year | Apps | Goals |
|---|---|---|---|
| Tunisia | 2018 | 4 | 0 |
| Tunisia | 2019 | 8 | 0 |
| Tunisia | 2021 | 8 | 0 |
| Tunisia | 2022 | 0 | 0 |
| Tunisia | 2023 | 1 | 0 |
| Tunisia | 2024 | 0 | 0 |
| Total | | 21 | 0 |

== Honours ==
Southampton

- EFL Cup runner-up: 2016–17
