= Nathan Redmond =

English footballer (born 1994)

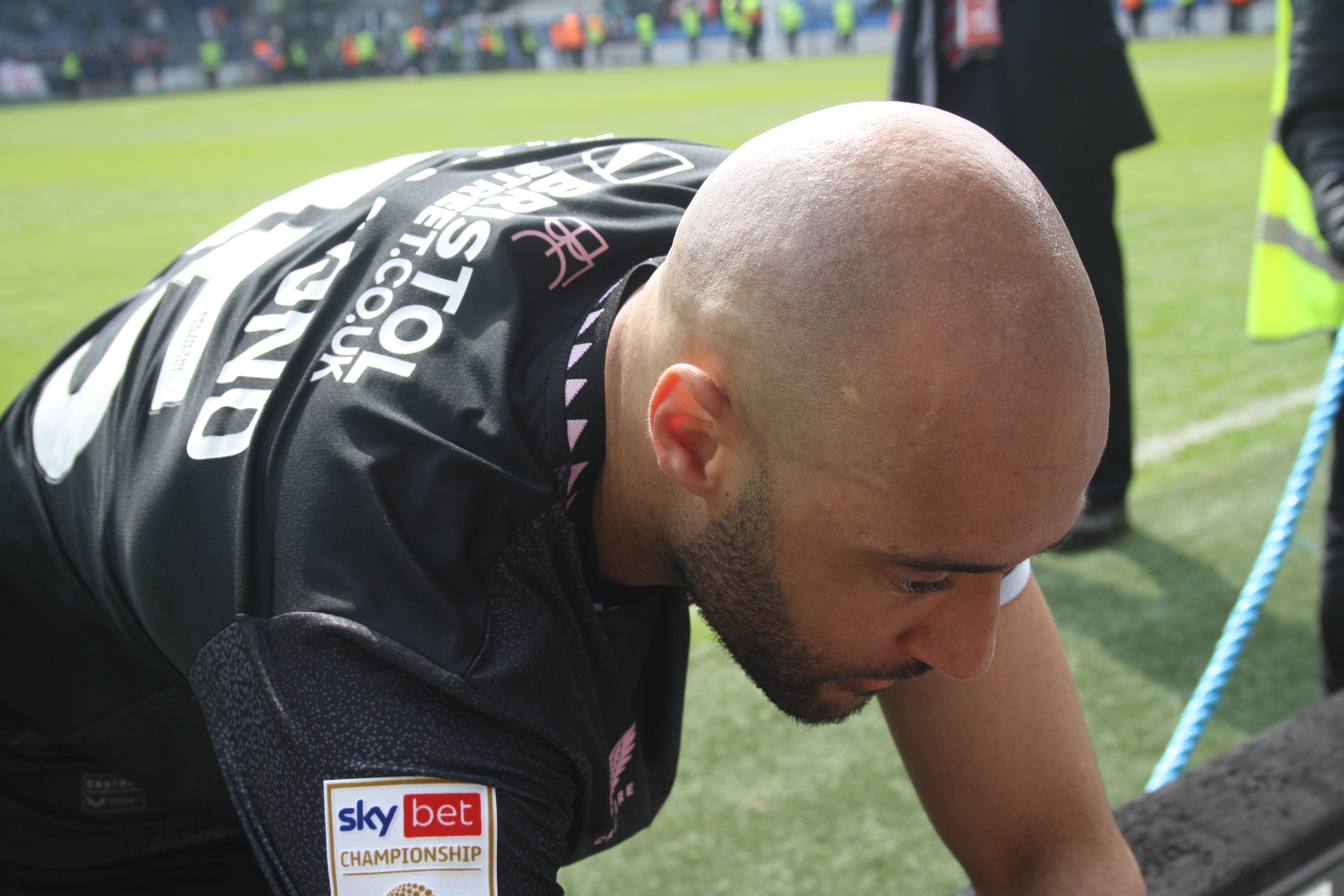
- Redmond in 2025

Personal information
- Full name: Nathan Daniel Jerome Redmond
- Date of birth: 6 March 1994 (age 32)
- Place of birth: Birmingham, England
- Height: 5 ft 8 in (1.73 m)
- Position: Winger

Youth career
- 2002–2010: Birmingham City

Senior career*
Years	Team	Apps	(Gls)
2010–2013	Birmingham City	62	(7)
2013–2016	Norwich City	112	(11)
2016–2022	Southampton	195	(21)
2022–2023	Beşiktaş	25	(5)
2023–2025	Burnley	14	(0)
2025–2026	Sheffield Wednesday	6	(0)
2026	Blackburn Rovers	2	(0)

International career
2009–2010	England U16	7	(1)
2010–2011	England U17	19	(2)
2011	England U18	1	(0)
2012–2013	England U19	8	(1)
2014	England U20	4	(0)
2013–2017	England U21	38	(10)
2017	England	1	(0)
- * Club domestic league appearances and goals as of 23:59, 30 June 2026 (UTC)

Nathan Daniel Jerome Redmond (born 6 March 1994) is an English professional footballer who plays as a winger. He is currently a free agent.

Redmond began his career as a youngster with Birmingham City, his hometown club. He made his first-team debut in the League Cup second-round tie against Rochdale in August 2010, becoming the club's second-youngest player ever at the age of 16 years and 173 days. After representing England at levels up to under-19, Redmond made his first under-21 debut in the 2013 European Under-21 Championship finals. He joined Premier League club Norwich City in 2013, before making the switch to Southampton in 2016. Just over six years later, he signed for Turkish Süper Lig club Beşiktaş. He joined Burnley in 2023 and had a brief spell at Sheffield Wednesday before joining Blackburn Rovers in March 2026 on a short-term deal until the end of the season.

Redmond represented England at youth levels from under-16 through to under-21, and played once for the senior England team, in 2017.

== Club career ==
=== Birmingham City ===
==== Early life and career ====
Redmond was born in Birmingham, West Midlands, of Irish and Jamaican descent. He grew up in the Kitts Green district, attending the Oval Primary School in Yardley and then Sheldon Heath Community Arts College. According to the player's Facebook page, he was first noticed by Birmingham City's Academy scouts as an eight-year-old while playing alongside older boys, and scored a hat-trick in his first match for the club's under-10 team.

He scored three goals as Birmingham's under-15 team reached the semi-final of the Nike Premier Cup for the first time in April 2009, and in the same season played in the club's under-18 academy team.

In the 2009–10 season, while still a schoolboy, Redmond made 15 appearances, scoring 3 times, for the academy under-18s. He also made a few substitute appearances for the reserve team, including a "lively late performance" against Aston Villa in early March 2010. Redmond was given a first-team squad number and named on standby for the Premier League match at home to Everton a couple of days later, but did not make the 18-man squad. He was an unused substitute for Birmingham's final home match of the 2009–10 season, aged 16 years and 56 days. Had he taken the field, he would have become the club's youngest first-team player and also the youngest ever Premier League player, at nine days younger than the record set by Fulham's Matthew Briggs in 2007.

Academy manager Terry Westley described him in June 2010 as "one of those wingers like an Aaron Lennon or Ashley Young. He has got pace and can run the ball past defenders and has the creativity to go with it", and confirmed that other clubs had shown an interest in him. He signed a scholarship contract with Birmingham City in July 2010.

Redmond made his first-team debut for Birmingham in the League Cup second-round tie against Rochdale on 26 August 2010, replacing Spanish midfielder Enric Vallès in the 78th minute. At 16 years and 173 days – 34 days older than Trevor Francis was on his debut – he became the club's second-youngest player ever. Manager Alex McLeish was complimentary about his brief appearance:

His performance was very bright, quick, he got a couple of shots away. And it excited me. It was a really bright spark for us. Has he got a big future? It looks like it. He's electric. He's a right winger but he showed his versatility coming in off the left and going in and hitting shots. He was a handful for Rochdale. It was good to see somebody with a little bit of pace going by defenders.

To gain first-team experience, Redmond joined League Two club Burton Albion in January 2011 on a month's Football League youth loan, an arrangement which allows the player to appear in junior matches for Birmingham when not required by the loaning club. However the move was cancelled a few days later when the Football League, who had initially ratified the deal, realised that the rules forbade a first-year scholar from signing on loan for a League club. He made two more substitute appearances for Birmingham that season, one in the League Cup and one in the FA Cup, and signed a three-year professional contract as soon as he turned 17, in March 2011.

==== 2011–12 season ====
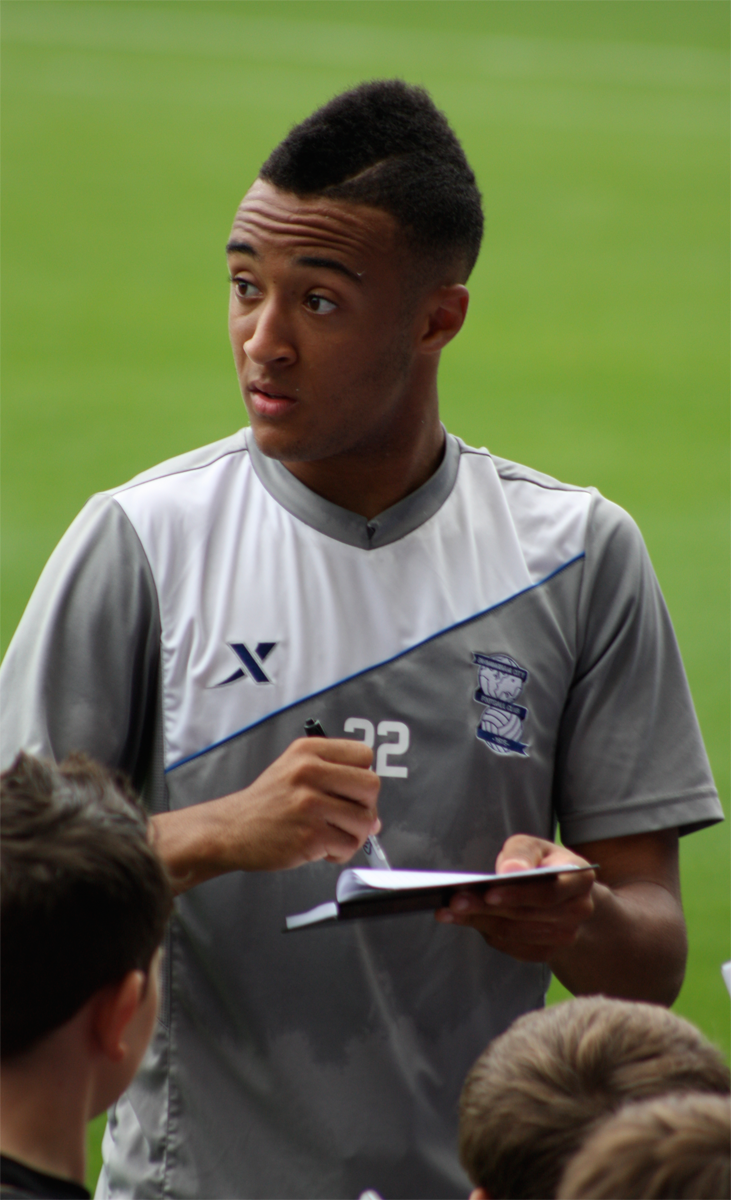
The 17-year-old Redmond pictured in 2011 pre-season

On his return from the U-17 World Cup, Redmond started Birmingham's first pre-season friendly match, a 1–0 defeat of Cork City. Birmingham manager Chris Hughton later said: "In particular I thought Nathan Redmond did very well. We have to remember he's only 17 years of age. He showed some good touches although the final bit let him down a little." Redmond played the whole of the Europa League play-off round first leg against Portuguese club Nacional, the first time he had completed 90 minutes in a senior match and the first time his club had participated in major European competition for nearly 50 years. His driven shot from outside the penalty area was pushed aside by goalkeeper Elisson Aparecido Rosa and led to Chris Wood heading against the crossbar. He made his League debut three days later, again playing the whole match, in a 3–1 defeat at Middlesbrough. In the second leg against Nacional, Redmond opened the scoring with a low drive from 20 yards (18 m), which was in contention for the club's goal of the season, and later hit the post with a curled shot in a man-of-the-match performance as Birmingham won 3–0 to progress to the group stage.

Redmond's first league goal came in a 3–0 win at home to Blackpool on 31 December 2011 as he "smashed an unstoppable shot from just outside the penalty area that beat Howard at his near post". His second, "thumped in ... from 12 yards in stoppage time" completed a 6–0 win away against a nine-man Millwall team. Redmond opened the scoring with a shot from the edge of the penalty area as Birmingham went on to beat Sheffield United 4–0 to progress to the fifth round of the 2011–12 FA Cup, and came off the bench to score a "stunning" 86th-minute swivelled volley to give Birmingham a 1–0 win against Portsmouth that took them to third place in the table. He finished the season with seven goals from 37 appearances in all competitions, and won the club's Young Player of the Year award.

==== 2012–13 season ====
Ahead of the new season, the club's acting chairman said that, despite financial problems, neither Redmond nor goalkeeper Jack Butland were for sale "unless we are subject to an eye-popping offer". Redmond aimed to establish himself as a first-team regular. He made his 50th senior appearance in the 1–0 win at Brighton & Hove Albion in October, but soon afterwards, Birmingham signed West Ham United winger Robert Hall on loan, and Redmond was sometimes left out of the squad. According to new manager Lee Clark, Redmond "needed to be taken out of the firing line and would be better for it"; he made comparisons with loanee Ravel Morrison, who had been encouraged to understand the importance of "the whole package, getting it right – the training, the preparation, the matches, getting that all put in place". After talking to his manager, Redmond accepted the need to improve his performance in training.

Against Burnley in December, in what was reportedly the youngest starting eleven ever fielded by the club, Redmond played as a second striker off Nikola Žigić, a position that exploited his pace and preference for receiving the ball to his feet. As the season went on, Redmond's form improved: he created a goal for Chris Burke against Nottingham Forest, and when his first goal of the season finally arrived, against Derby County in March, Clark suggested it boded well for his future as a goalscorer. The player spoke of himself as a "confidence player", who needed to accept the need for patience and not to let frustration get the better of him. According to the Birmingham Mail's end-of-season assessment, "Redmond's form over the last three months was as good as it ever has been." That form earned him selection for the England under-20 squad for the Under-20 World Cup, then as a late addition to the squad for the 2013 European Under-21 Championship finals.

=== Norwich City ===
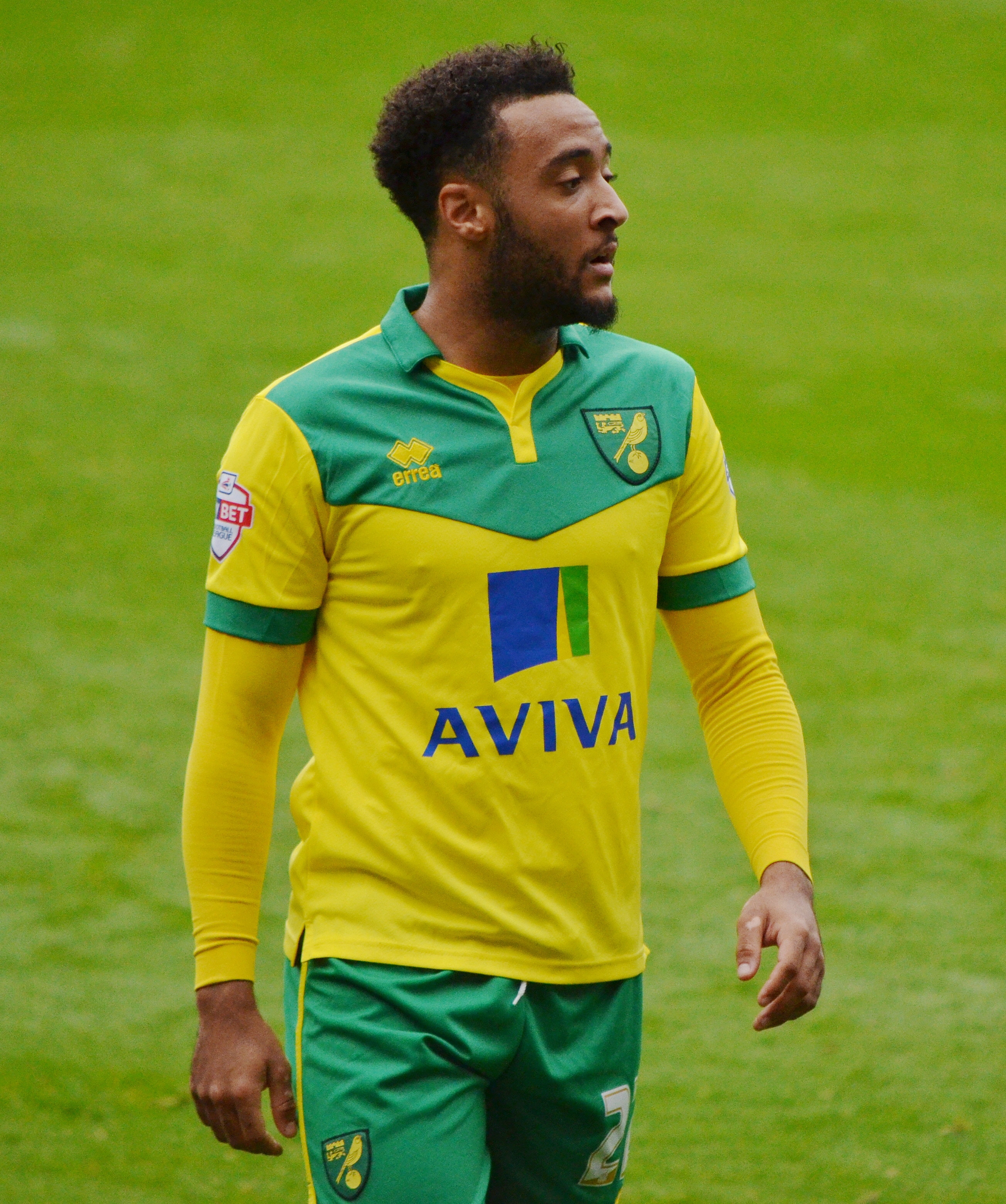
Redmond playing for Norwich City in 2014

The sale of Butland to Stoke City in January meant that no other players needed to leave in that transfer window, and Clark made it clear towards the end of the season that it would be a foolish move to cash in on Redmond in the close season. However, at the start of the 2013 summer transfer window, Birmingham accepted bids from Premier League clubs Swansea City and Norwich City, reportedly an initial £2 million plus up to £1.2 million in additional payments. Redmond chose to rejoin Chris Hughton at Norwich, where he signed a four-year contract.

He made his debut for Norwich in a 2–2 draw with Everton on 17 August 2013, and scored his first goal two weeks later against Southampton; playing on the left wing – not his natural side – he "cut inside and lashed home low from the edge of the box" to secure Norwich's first league win of the season.

=== Southampton ===
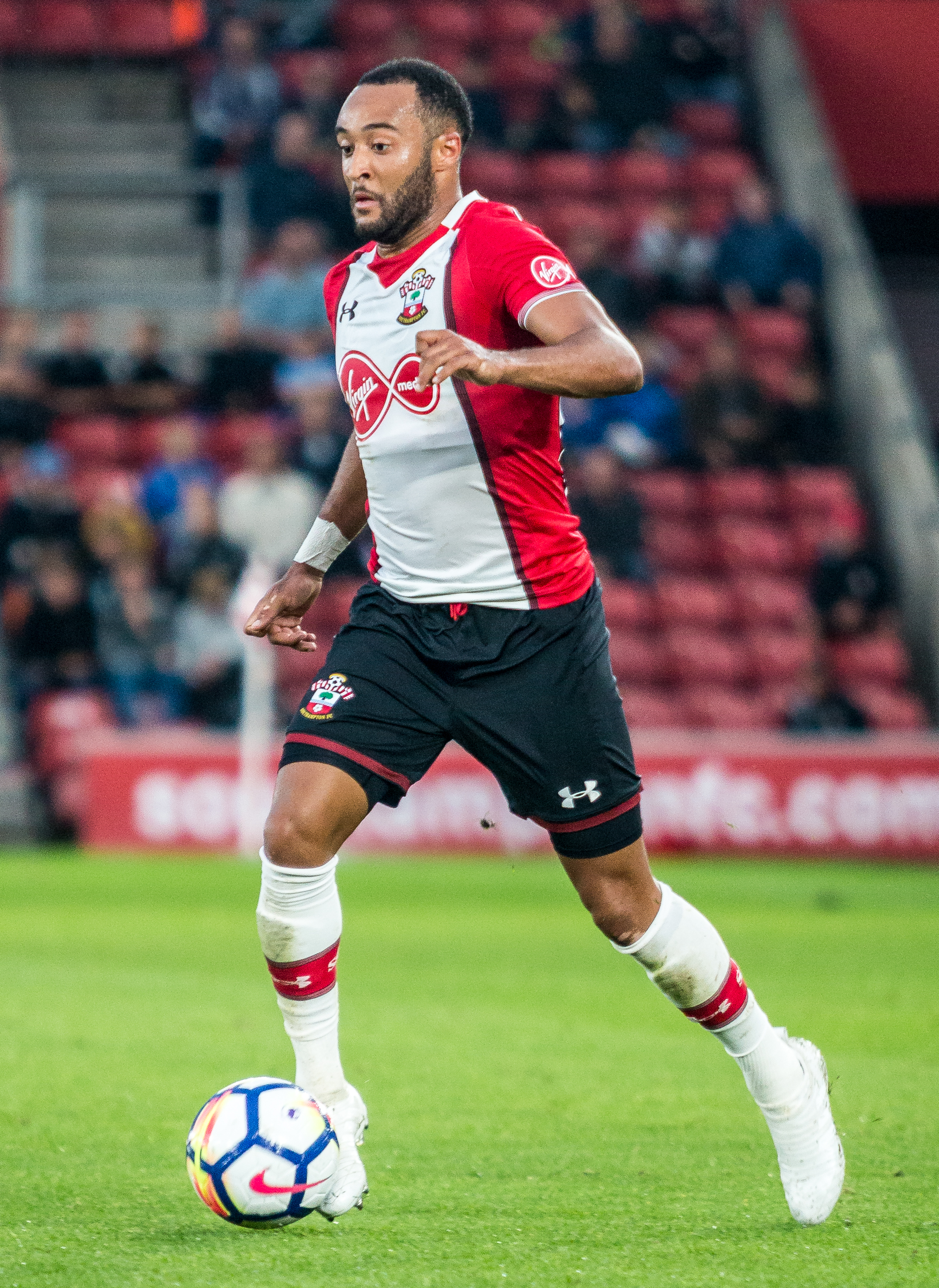
Redmond playing for Southampton in 2017

On 25 June 2016, Redmond completed a move to Premier League club Southampton for an undisclosed fee, believed by BBC Sport to be £10 million. He signed a five-year contract. Redmond scored on his competitive debut, with the equalising goal in a 1–1 draw at home to Watford on 13 August.

In Redmond's third season with the club, he made a big contribution towards Southampton's Premier League survival as they finished in 16th place, five points above relegation, This was reflected when he was awarded both Fans' and Players' Player of the year at the end of season awards. Redmond commented that "The boys in the dressing room, the manager and the coaching staff have enabled me to play with confidence and affect games in a positive way".

Before the start of the 2019–20 Premier League season, Redmond signed a new four-year deal with Southampton, extending his stay with the club until the summer of 2023. He said "I feel like we can hopefully build something special and to be a part of it for the next four years is good for me."

On 20 March 2021, Redmond scored twice and set up another goal in a 3–0 victory against AFC Bournemouth to help Southampton reach the FA Cup semi-finals.

=== Beşiktaş ===
After more than six years with Southampton, Redmond signed for Süper Lig club Beşiktaş on 8 September 2022.

=== Burnley ===
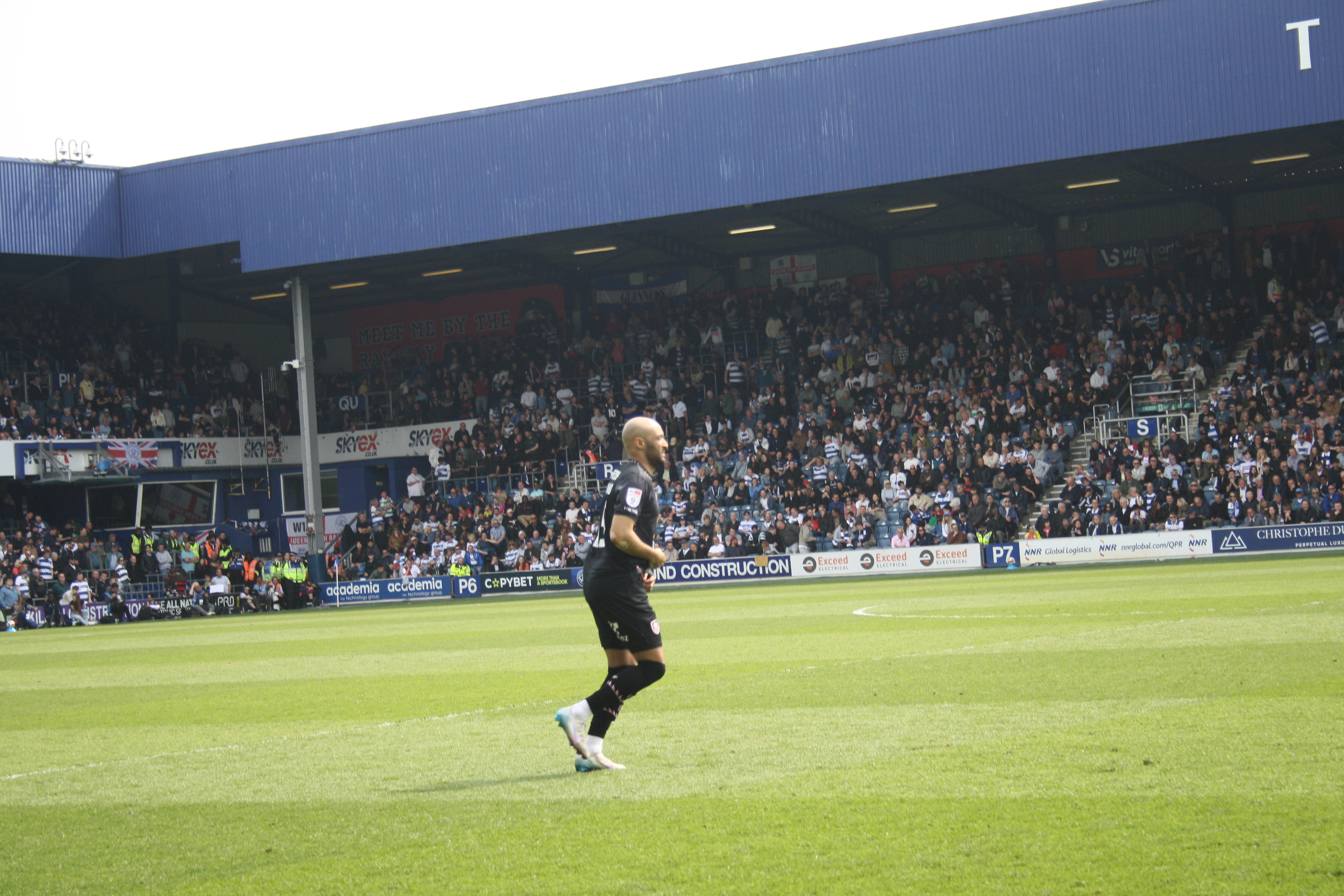
Redmond playing for Burnley in 2025

On 21 July 2023, Redmond signed for Burnley on a two-year deal, with the option of a third.

On 20 May 2025, the club announced he would be leaving in June when his contract expired.

=== Sheffield Wednesday ===
On 27 November 2025, Redmond signed a short-term contract until January for Championship club Sheffield Wednesday. He made his debut two-days later, replacing Gabriel Otegbayo in a 2–3 defeat against Preston North End. Having played just 11 minutes on his debut, manager Henrik Pedersen confirmed on 9 December that he had picked up a groin injury and would miss the rest of December. On 30 January 2026, it was confirmed that Redmond's short-term contract was not renewed following its expiry, having made seven appearances, all from the bench.

=== Blackburn Rovers ===
On 27 March 2026, Redmond joined Blackburn Rovers on a short-term deal until the end of the season. On 19 May, it was announced that Redmond would be departing the club when his contract expires at the end of next month.

Redmond made two appearances for the club.

== International career ==
Redmond first played for the England under-16 team on 15 October 2009. He was involved in the build-up for the only goal of the match, as England under-16 beat their Wales counterparts in their opening match of the 2009 Victory Shield, a tournament which they went on to win. In 2010, he played in all four matches, and scored his first international goal, as the under-16s reached the final of the Montaigu Tournament.

He made his debut for England under-17s on 3 August 2010 in the Nordic Tournament in a 5–0 win against Finland under-17s, and scored the opening goal against Denmark under-17s, as England went on to defeat Sweden under-17s in the final. Redmond was part of the England under-17 squad that qualified for the 2011 European under-17 championships. Needing to beat Spain to finish top of their elite round group, Redmond opened the scoring from a Raheem Sterling cross as England went on to win 2–1. In the final stages, he started the first two group matches, a draw with France and a defeat against Denmark, and was a substitute in the remaining group match, a 3–0 victory against Serbia which took England through to the semi-final and confirmed their qualification for the 2011 FIFA U-17 World Cup. Redmond was a second-half substitute in the semi-final match, which England lost to the Netherlands.

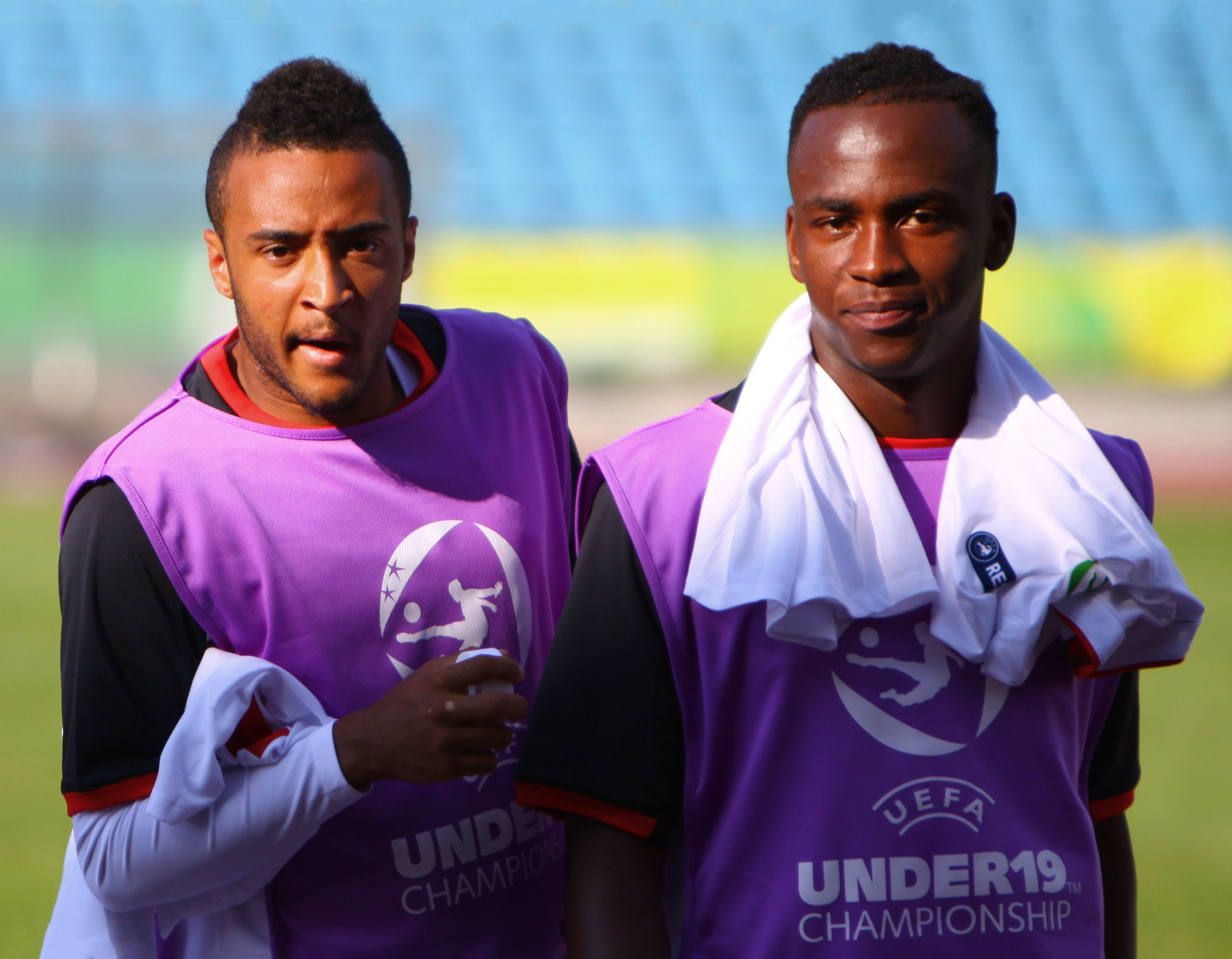
Redmond (left) and Saido Berahino with England under-19s in 2012

Together with many of his under-17 teammates, Redmond moved up to the England under-18s, a non-competitive age group at international level, in 2011. He made a positive debut in a 1–1 draw away to Slovakia in November. Brought into the under-19s squad to replace the injured Larnell Cole, Redmond made his first appearance at that level in February 2012, as a 57th-minute substitute for Saido Berahino in a 2–1 defeat of the Czech Republic. He was part of the squad for the 2012 European under-19 championships, and scored the winning goal against Serbia in the group stage that confirmed England's progression to the semi-final and qualification for the 2013 FIFA U-20 World Cup.

Under-20 manager Peter Taylor confirmed in a radio interview that Redmond, whom he described as "a clever winger [who] can play as a number 10, as they call it, also" and who had "had an outstanding season", would be in his squad for the Under-20 World Cup. A few days later, he was called into the under-21 squad for the 2013 European Under-21 Championship finals, as a late replacement for Andros Townsend. With Tom Ince suspended and Wilfried Zaha injured, Redmond started England's opening match of the tournament, a 1–0 defeat to Italy. Captain Jordan Henderson, manager Stuart Pearce, pundits and press picked out Redmond for praise in a generally poor team performance. He kept his place for the second group match, against Norway, as part of a three-man attack alongside the returning Ince and Zaha. The Independent's Steve Tongue described him as "one of the few who offered any promise, until he was replaced" by Jonjo Shelvey, but a 3–1 defeat confirmed England's elimination.

Redmond scored the first goal and was named the sponsors' man of the match as England under-21s, under senior team manager Roy Hodgson, beat Scotland 6–0 in August 2013. His hat-trick against Wales U21 in May 2014 gave England a 3–1 win that opened up a nine-point lead in their qualifying group for the 2015 European Championships. Redmond was chosen England Under-21 Player of the Year for 2016, with 32% of the vote, ahead of Southampton teammate James Ward-Prowse with 25%.

On 16 March 2017, he was named in the senior England squad that was to play a friendly against Germany and a World Cup qualifying match against Lithuania. He went on to make his full England debut in the Germany match, coming on as a 66th-minute substitute for Adam Lallana, but that was his last call-up for another two years.

In the meantime, it was reported that Redmond was one of the dual-eligible players that new Ireland manager Mick McCarthy would attempt to recruit for that nation. McCarthy spoke to Redmond's agent but, by the end of February 2019, said he had not managed to meet with the player himself. When Redmond's "outstanding form" earned him a place in Gareth Southgate's 27-man provisional group for the 2019 UEFA Nations League Finals, McCarthy accepted that it was England that he wanted to represent. Neither Redmond nor Southampton team-mate James Ward-Prowse made the final 23, but both stayed on to train with the squad ahead of the tournament.

In a televised interview in March 2021, Jamaican Football Federation (JFF) president Michael Ricketts included Redmond in a list of eligible English players he said were "in the process of acquiring their Jamaican passport" as part of the nation's plan to improve their chances of qualifying for the 2022 World Cup. Three weeks later, Redmond told the Southampton-based Daily Echo that he had not been contacted by the JFF, nor had he discussed the prospect of a switch with his family. However, the JFF then officially contacted Southampton in early April 2021 in order to formally request that Redmond represent Jamaica.

== Career statistics ==
=== Club ===
As of 14 April 2026

Appearances and goals by club, season and competition
Club	Season	League			National cup (Note: Includes FA Cup, Turkish Cup)		League cup (Note: Includes EFL Cup)		Other		Total	
Club	Season	Division	Apps	Goals	Apps	Goals	Apps	Goals	Apps	Goals	Apps	Goals
Birmingham City	2010–11	Premier League	0	0	1	0	2	0	—		3	0
Birmingham City	2011–12	Championship	24	5	5	1	1	0	7 (Note: Five appearances and one goal in UEFA Europa League, two appearances in Championship play-offs)	1	37	7
Birmingham City	2012–13	Championship	38	2	2	0	2	0	—		42	2
Birmingham City	Total		62	7	8	1	5	0	7	1	82	9
Norwich City	2013–14	Premier League	34	1	2	0	3	0	—		39	1
Norwich City	2014–15	Championship	43	4	1	0	0	0	3 (Note: Appearances in Championship play-offs)	2	47	6
Norwich City	2015–16	Premier League	35	6	1	0	1	0	—		37	6
Norwich City	Total		112	11	4	0	4	0	3	2	123	13
Southampton	2016–17	Premier League	37	7	3	0	5	1	5 (Note: Appearances in UEFA Europa League)	0	50	8
Southampton	2017–18	Premier League	31	1	4	0	1	0	—		36	1
Southampton	2018–19	Premier League	38	6	2	3	3	0	—		43	9
Southampton	2019–20	Premier League	32	4	2	0	3	1	—		37	5
Southampton	2020–21	Premier League	29	2	3	2	1	0	—		33	4
Southampton	2021–22	Premier League	27	1	3	1	2	1	—		32	3
Southampton	2022–23	Premier League	1	0	—		0	0	—		1	0
Southampton	Total		195	21	17	6	15	3	5	0	232	30
Beşiktaş	2022–23	Süper Lig	25	5	3	1	—		—		28	6
Burnley	2023–24	Premier League	12	0	1	0	2	0	—		15	0
Burnley	2024–25	Championship	2	0	1	0	0	0	—		3	0
Burnley	Total		14	0	2	0	2	0	—		18	0
Sheffield Wednesday	2025–26	Championship	6	0	1	0	—		—		7	0
Blackburn Rovers	2025–26	Championship	2	0	—		—		—		2	0
Career total			416	44	35	8	26	3	15	3	492	58

=== International ===
As of match played 22 March 2017

Appearances and goals by national team and year
National team	Year	Apps	Goals
England	2017	1	0
Total		1	0

== Honours ==
Norwich City

- Football League Championship play-offs: 2015

Southampton

- EFL Cup runner-up: 2016–17

England U16

- Victory Shield: 2009
- Montaigu Tournament runner-up: 2010

England U17

- Nordic Under-17 Football Championship: 2010

England U21

- Toulon Tournament: 2016

Individual

- UEFA European Under-21 Championship Team of the Tournament: 2015
- England Under-21 Player of the Year: 2016
- Southampton Players' Player of the Season: 2018–19
- Southampton Fans' Player of the Season: 2018–19
