= 2021–22 Swansea City A.F.C. season =

Swansea City
2021–22 season
- Chairman: Julian Winter
- Head coach: Russell Martin
- Stadium: Swansea.com Stadium
- Championship: 15th
- FA Cup: Third round
- EFL Cup: Third round
- Top goalscorer: League: Joël Piroe (22); All: Joël Piroe (24)
| Home colours | Away colours | Third colours |

The 2021–22 season was Swansea City's 110th season in existence and their fourth consecutive season in the second tier of English football, the Championship. Alongside the Championship, they also competed in the FA Cup and the EFL Cup. This season covers the period from 1 June 2021 to 31 May 2022.

== Pre-season ==
=== Managerial change ===
Head coach Steve Cooper left the club by mutual consent during pre-season, on 21 July 2021. He was replaced by Russell Martin on 1 August, six days before Swansea's first game of the season.

=== Friendlies ===
The Swans announced they would have friendlies against Swindon Town, Plymouth Argyle, Bristol Rovers, and Forest Green Rovers and Southampton as part of the club's pre-season preparations. However, the friendly against Swindon was cancelled due to "ongoing logistical and operational issues" at Swindon. The friendly against Bristol Rovers was also cancelled due to positive COVID-19 cases within Swansea's first-team bubble.

| 14 July 2021 Friendly | Newport County | 0–1 | Swansea City | Lliswerry |
| BST | | Report | Whittaker | Stadium: Newport International Sports Village; Attendance: 0 (Behind-closed-doors) |

| 14 July 2021 Friendly | Newport County | 0–4 | Swansea City | Lliswerry |
| BST | | Report | Byers; Cullen; Lowe x2 | Stadium: Newport International Sports Village; Attendance: 0 (Behind-closed-doors) |

| 17 July 2021 Friendly | Newport County | 0–5 | Swansea City | Lliswerry |
| BST | | Report | Cullen 10', 29'; Margetson 33'; Dhanda (?); Latibeaudiere (?) | Stadium: Newport International Sports Village; Attendance: 0 (Behind-closed-doors) |

| 17 July 2021 Friendly | Swindon Town | Cancelled | Swansea City | Swindon |
| 15:00 BST | | | | Stadium: County Ground |
Note: Match cancelled due to ongoing logistical issues at Swindon Town.

| 20 July 2021 Friendly | Plymouth Argyle | 1–2 | Swansea City | Plymouth |
| 19:00 BST | Hardie 47' | Report | Whittaker 23'; Cullen 32' | Stadium: Home Park |

| 24 July 2021 Friendly | Bristol Rovers | Cancelled | Swansea City | Horfield |
| 15:00 BST | | | | Stadium: Memorial Stadium |
Note: Match cancelled due to positive COVID-19 cases in Swansea's first-team bubble.

| 28 July 2021 Friendly | Forest Green Rovers | 1–2 | Swansea City | Nailsworth |
| 19:00 BST | Stevens 86' (pen.) | Report | Dhanda 65'; Lloyd 70' | Stadium: The New Lawn |

| 31 July 2021 Friendly | Swansea City | 1–3 | Southampton | Landore |
| 15:00 BST | Salisu 13' (o.g.) | Report | Tella 14'; Redmond 22'; Armstrong 58' | Stadium: Liberty Stadium (Note: This match took place before The Liberty Stadium was renamed the Swansea.com Stadium on 9 August 2021.); Attendance: 5,091 |

== Club ==
=== Club officials ===
As of 8 December 2021

| Role | Name |
|---|---|
| Owners | (United States) Jason Levien (United States) Steve Kaplan |
| Chief executive | (England) Julian Winter |
| Sporting director | (Wales) Mark Allen |
| Honorary club president | (Wales) Alan Curtis |
| Club ambassador | (England) Lee Trundle |

=== First-team staff ===
As of 25 September 2021

| Role | Name |
|---|---|
| Head coach | (Scotland) Russell Martin |
| Assistant head coach | (England) Luke Williams |
| Technical development coach | (England) Matthew Gill |
| Head of physical performance | (England) Matt Willmott |
| Goalkeeping coach | (England) Dean Thornton |
| First-team performance analyst | (England) Ben Parker |

=== First-team squad ===
As of 31 January 2022

Note: Flags indicate national team as defined under FIFA eligibility rules; some limited exceptions apply. Players may hold more than one non-FIFA nationality.

| No. | Pos. | Nation | Player |
|---|---|---|---|
| 2 | DF | ENG | Ryan Bennett |
| 3 | DF | IRL | Ryan Manning |
| 4 | MF | ENG | Flynn Downes |
| 5 | DF | WAL | Ben Cabango |
| 6 | MF | SCO | Jay Fulton |
| 7 | MF | ENG | Korey Smith |
| 8 | MF | ENG | Matt Grimes (captain) |
| 9 | FW | IRL | Michael Obafemi |
| 10 | MF | FRA | Olivier Ntcham |
| 12 | FW | ENG | Jamie Paterson |
| 13 | MF | AUT | Hannes Wolf (on loan from Borussia M'gladbach) |

| No. | Pos. | Nation | Player |
|---|---|---|---|
| 14 | FW | SCO | Kyle Joseph |
| 15 | DF | ENG | Nathanael Ogbeta |
| 17 | FW | NED | Joël Piroe |
| 18 | GK | ENG | Ben Hamer |
| 19 | DF | WAL | Tivonge Rushesha |
| 21 | MF | ENG | Yan Dhanda |
| 22 | DF | ENG | Joel Latibeaudiere |
| 23 | DF | IRL | Cyrus Christie (on loan from Fulham) |
| 26 | DF | ENG | Kyle Naughton |
| 30 | DF | ENG | Finley Burns (on loan from Manchester City) |
| 33 | GK | ENG | Andy Fisher |

== Competitions ==
=== Championship ===
==== League table ====
| Pos | Team | Pld | W | D | L | GF | GA | GD | Pts |
|---|---|---|---|---|---|---|---|---|---|
| 12 | Coventry City | 46 | 17 | 13 | 16 | 60 | 59 | +1 | 64 |
| 13 | Preston North End | 46 | 16 | 16 | 14 | 52 | 56 | −4 | 64 |
| 14 | Stoke City | 46 | 17 | 11 | 18 | 57 | 52 | +5 | 62 |
| 15 | Swansea City | 46 | 16 | 13 | 17 | 58 | 68 | −10 | 61 |
| 16 | Blackpool | 46 | 16 | 12 | 18 | 54 | 58 | −4 | 60 |
| 17 | Bristol City | 46 | 15 | 10 | 21 | 62 | 77 | −15 | 55 |
| 18 | Cardiff City | 46 | 15 | 8 | 23 | 50 | 68 | −18 | 53 |

Source: EFL Official Website
Rules for classification: 1) Points; 2) Goal difference; 3) Number of goals scored; 4) Head-to-head results; 5) Wins; 6) Away goals; 7) Penalty points (sec 9.5); 8) 12-point sending off offences

==== Results summary ====
| Overall | | | | | | | | Home | | | | | | Away | | | | | |
| Pld | W | D | L | GF | GA | GD | Pts | W | D | L | GF | GA | GD | W | D | L | GF | GA | GD |
|---|---|---|---|---|---|---|---|---|---|---|---|---|---|---|---|---|---|---|---|
| 46 | 16 | 13 | 17 | 58 | 68 | −10 | 61 | 9 | 8 | 6 | 30 | 27 | +3 | 7 | 5 | 11 | 28 | 41 | −13 |

Last updated: 7 May 2022.
Source: FBREF

==== Results by matchday ====
| Matchday | 1 | 2 | 3 | 4 | 5 | 6 | 7 | 8 | 9 | 10 | 11 | 12 | 13 | 14 | 15 | 16 | 17 | 18 | 19 | 20 | 21 | 22 | 23 | 24 | 25 | 26 | 27 | 28 | 29 | 30 | 31 | 32 | 33 | 34 | 35 | 36 | 37 | 38 | 39 | 40 | 41 | 42 | 43 | 44 | 45 | 46 |
|---|---|---|---|---|---|---|---|---|---|---|---|---|---|---|---|---|---|---|---|---|---|---|---|---|---|---|---|---|---|---|---|---|---|---|---|---|---|---|---|---|---|---|---|---|---|---|
| Ground | A | H | H | A | A | H | H | A | H | A | A | H | H | A | H | A | A | H | A | H | A | H | A | H | A | A | H | H | A | H | A | A | H | H | A | A | H | A | A | H | H | A | H | H | A | H |
| Result | L | D | L | W | L | D | D | D | W | L | D | W | W | L | W | W | L | D | W | L | L | L | D | W | D | L | L | W | L | W | L | W | W | L | L | W | D | W | W | W | D | D | D | D | L | L |
| Position | 21 | 19 | 20 | 16 | 19 | 21 | 20 | 21 | 17 | 19 | 19 | 17 | 15 | 16 | 13 | 11 | 12 | 12 | 9 | 9 | 14 | 16 | 17 | 17 | 17 | 19 | 19 | 16 | 16 | 16 | 17 | 16 | 16 | 16 | 16 | 15 | 16 | 16 | 15 | 14 | 14 | 13 | 14 | 14 | 15 | 15 |

Updated to match(es) played on 7 May 2022. Source: Statto.com
A = Away; H = Home; W = Win; D = Draw; L = Loss

==== Matches ====
Swansea City's fixtures were revealed on 24 June 2021.

| 7 August 2021 1 | Blackburn Rovers | 2–1 | Swansea City | Blackburn |
| 15:00 BST | Gallagher 36'; Brereton 48' (pen.) | Report | Paterson 52' | Stadium: Ewood Park; Attendance: 10,260; Referee: David Webb |

| 14 August 2021 2 | Swansea City | 0–0 | Sheffield United | Landore |
| 20:00 BST | | Report | | Stadium: Swansea.com Stadium; Attendance: 15,946; Referee: Keith Stroud |
Note: Live on Sky Sports

| 17 August 2021 3 | Swansea City | 1–3 | Stoke City | Landore |
| 19:45 BST | Piroe 73' | Report | Powell 15'; Clucas 53'; Østigård 60' | Stadium: Swansea.com Stadium; Attendance: 15,927; Referee: Josh Smith |

| 20 August 2021 4 | Bristol City | 0–1 | Swansea City | Ashton Gate |
| 19:45 BST | | Report | Piroe 19' | Stadium: Ashton Gate Stadium; Attendance: 20,139; Referee: Geoff Eltringham |
Note: Live on Sky Sports

| 28 August 2021 5 | Preston North End | 3–1 | Swansea City | Deepdale |
| 15:00 BST | Van den Berg 21'; Riis Jakobsen 45+2'; Whiteman 52' | Report | Piroe 19' | Stadium: Deepdale; Attendance: 10,180; Referee: Thomas Bramall |

| 11 September 2021 6 | Swansea City | 0–0 | Hull City | Landore |
| 15:00 BST | | Report | | Stadium: Swansea.com Stadium; Attendance: 16,317; Referee: Keith Stroud |

| 15 September 2021 7 | Swansea City | 0–0 | Millwall | Landore |
| 19:45 BST | | Report | | Stadium: Swansea.com Stadium; Attendance: 16,007; Referee: John Busby |

| 18 September 2021 8 | Luton Town | 3–3 | Swansea City | Luton |
| 15:00 BST | Berry 7'; Adebayo 15' (pen.), 23' | Report | Paterson 63'; Ntcham 86'; Piroe 90+2' | Stadium: Kenilworth Road; Attendance: 9,721; Referee: Tony Harrington |

| 25 September 2021 9 | Swansea City | 1–0 | Huddersfield Town | Landore |
| 15:00 BST | Piroe 17' | Report | | Stadium: Swansea.com Stadium; Attendance: 17,091; Referee: Gavin Ward |

| 29 September 2021 10 | Fulham | 3–1 | Swansea City | Fulham |
| 19:45 BST | Mitrović 12', 32', 45' | Report | Paterson 38' | Stadium: Craven Cottage; Attendance: 16,113; Referee: Josh Smith |
Note: Live on Sky Sports

| 2 October 2021 11 | Derby County | 0–0 | Swansea City | Derby |
| 15:00 BST | | Report | | Stadium: Pride Park Stadium; Attendance: 21,640; Referee: Andrew Madley |

| 17 October 2021 12 | Swansea City | 3–0 | Cardiff City | Landore |
| 12:00 BST | Paterson 29'; Piroe 60'; Bidwell 74' | Report | | Stadium: Swansea.com Stadium; Referee: James Linington |
Note: Live on Sky Sports

| 20 October 2021 13 | Swansea City | 2–1 | West Bromwich Albion | Landore |
| 19:45 BST | Piroe 61'; Paterson 83' | Report | Grant 1' | Stadium: Swansea.com Stadium; Attendance: 16,694; Referee: Simon Hooper |
Note: Live on Sky Sports

| 23 October 2021 14 | Birmingham City | 2–1 | Swansea City | Bordesley |
| 15:00 BST | Deeney 47'; McGree 82' | Report | Obafemi 77' | Stadium: St Andrew's; Attendance: 16,132; Referee: Oliver Langford |

| 30 October 2021 15 | Swansea City | 3–0 | Peterborough United | Landore |
| 15:00 BST | Bidwell 2'; Piroe 13'; Ntcham 45+1' | Report | | Stadium: Swansea.com Stadium; Attendance: 16,639; Referee: Matt Donohue |

| 2 November 2021 16 | Coventry City | 1–2 | Swansea City | Coventry |
| 19:45 GMT | McFadzean 27' | Report | Paterson 5'; Piroe 12' | Stadium: Coventry Building Society Arena; Attendance: 16,514; Referee: Andy Davies |

| 6 November 2021 17 | Bournemouth | 4–0 | Swansea City | Kings Park |
| 15:00 GMT | Solanke 26', 49'; Anthony 64', 90+4' | Report | | Stadium: Vitality Stadium; Referee: Tony Harrington |

| 20 November 2021 18 | Swansea City | 1–1 | Blackpool | Landore |
| 15:00 GMT | Piroe 35' | Report | Anderson 86' | Stadium: Swansea.com Stadium; Attendance: 16,886; Referee: Keith Stroud |

| 24 November 2021 19 | Barnsley | 0–2 | Swansea City | Barnsley |
| 19:45 GMT | | Report | Ntcham 74'; Paterson 80' | Stadium: Oakwell; Attendance: 11,342; Referee: David Webb |

| 27 November 2021 20 | Swansea City | 2–3 | Reading | Landore |
| 15:00 GMT | Paterson 3'; Manning 49'; Laird (yellow card) 83' | Report | Dele-Bashiru 4'; Carroll 30'; Drinkwater 50', (yellow card) 74'; Swift (yellow card) 86'; Pușcaș (yellow card) 89' | Stadium: Swansea.com Stadium; Attendance: 16,980; Referee: Tony Harrington |

| 4 December 2021 21 | Middlesbrough | 1–0 | Swansea City | Middlesbrough |
| 15:00 GMT | Jones 26'; McNair (yellow card) 70' | Report | Paterson (yellow card) 45' | Stadium: Riverside Stadium; Attendance: 18,707; Referee: Andy Davies |

| 11 December 2021 22 | Swansea City | 1–4 | Nottingham Forest | Landore |
| 15:00 GMT | Downes (yellow card) 11'; Smith (yellow card) 31'; Cabango (yellow card) 55'; Piroe 62' | Report | Osei-Tutu (yellow card) 20'; Zinckernagel 48'; Grabban 50'; Spence (yellow card) 55'; McKenna (yellow card) 66'; Johnson 68'; Cafú 90+3', (yellow card) 90+4' | Stadium: Swansea.com Stadium; Attendance: 17,659; Referee: Matt Donohue |

| 15 January 2022 23 | Huddersfield Town | 1–1 | Swansea City | Huddersfield |
| 15:00 GMT | Sinani 15' | Report | Downes 78' | Stadium: John Smith's Stadium; Attendance: 20,535; Referee: David Webb |

| 22 January 2022 24 | Swansea City | 1–0 | Preston North End | Landore |
| 15:00 GMT | Manning (yellow card) 12', (goal) 51'; Latibeaudiere (yellow card) 87'; Smith (yellow card) 88' | Report | Cunningham (yellow card) 64'; Evans (yellow card) 87'; Bauer (yellow card) 90+1' | Stadium: Swansea.com Stadium; Attendance: 16,842; Referee: Josh Smith |

| 25 January 2022 25 | Queens Park Rangers | 0–0 | Swansea City | Shepherd's Bush |
| 19:45 GMT | Odubajo (yellow card) 69'; Johansen (yellow card) 76'; Austin (yellow card) 90+2' | Report | Smith (yellow card) 29'; Cabango (yellow card) 47'; Downes (yellow card) 72' (yellow-red card) 90+2'; Obafemi (yellow card) 90+5' | Stadium: Kiyan Prince Foundation Stadium; Attendance: 12,770; Referee: Andy Davies |
Note: Live on Sky Sports

| 29 January 2022 26 | Hull City | 2–0 | Swansea City | Kingston upon Hull |
| 15:00 GMT | Eaves 5'; Lewis-Potter 17' | Report | Manning (yellow card) 80'; Walsh (yellow card) 85' | Stadium: MKM Stadium; Attendance: 13,101; Referee: Leigh Doughty |

| 1 February 2022 27 | Swansea City | 0–1 | Luton Town | Landore |
| 19:45 GMT | Downes (yellow card) 10'; Piroe (yellow card) 90+2' | Report | Hylton (yellow card) 34'; Cornick 72'; Lansbury (yellow card) 75'; Burke (yellow card) 88'; Berry (yellow card) 89' | Stadium: Swansea.com Stadium; Attendance: 16,598; Referee: Oliver Langford |

| 5 February 2022 28 | Swansea City | 1–0 | Blackburn Rovers | Landore |
| 17:30 GMT | Obafemi 16'; Ntcham (yellow card) 37'; Manning (yellow card) 38' (yellow-red card) 53'; Christie (yellow card) 90+2' | Report | Rothwell (yellow card) 24'; Buckley (yellow card) 33' | Stadium: Swansea.com Stadium; Attendance: 16,933; Referee: Tim Robinson |
Note: Live on Sky Sports

| 8 February 2022 29 | Stoke City | 3–0 | Swansea City | Stoke-on-Trent |
| 19:45 GMT | Wilmot (yellow card) 45'; Philogene 47'; Baker 59' (pen.); Brown 78', (yellow card) 85' | Report | Christie (yellow card) 26'; Grimes (yellow card) 29'; Ntcham (yellow card) 31'; Bennett (red card) 58'; Wolf (yellow card) 85' | Stadium: bet365 Stadium; Attendance: 17,720; Referee: Jeremy Simpson |
Note: Live on Sky Sports

| 13 February 2022 30 | Swansea City | 3–1 | Bristol City | Landore |
| 13:00 GMT | Obafemi 54', (yellow card) 56'; Christie 79', (yellow card) 90+2'; Piroe 90+4' | Report | Weimann 42'; Klose (yellow card) 59'; Dasilva (yellow card) 69'; Semenyo (yellow card) 86'; Martin (yellow card) 90+2' | Stadium: Swansea.com Stadium; Attendance: 19,162; Referee: Keith Stroud |

| 19 February 2022 31 | Sheffield United | 4–0 | Swansea City | Landore |
| 15:00 GMT | Gibbs-White 14', 78'; Baldock 17', (yellow card) 41'; Sharp 38'; Norwood (yellow card) 39' | Report | | Stadium: Swansea.com Stadium; Attendance: 26,564; Referee: David Webb |

| 26 February 2022 32 | West Bromwich Albion | 0–2 | Swansea City | West Bromwich |
| 15:00 GMT | | Report | Downes (yellow card) 33'; Cabango (yellow card) 64'; Piroe 79'; Christie 84' | Stadium: The Hawthorns; Referee: Dean Whitestone |

| 5 March 2022 33 | Swansea City | 3–1 | Coventry City | Landore |
| 15:00 GMT | Paterson 12'; Naughton (yellow card) 17'; Obafemi 40', 48'; Cabango (yellow card) 69' | Report | Bidwell (yellow card) 8'; Clarke-Salter (yellow card) 72'; Hamer 84' | Stadium: Swansea.com Stadium; Attendance: 18,405; Referee: Geoff Eltringham |

| 8 March 2022 34 | Swansea City | 1–5 | Fulham | Landore |
| 19:45 GMT | Manning (red card) 42'; Piroe 75' | Report | Mitrović 46'; Cabango 52' (o.g.); Decordova-Reid 73'; Williams 77', 85' | Stadium: Swansea.com Stadium; Attendance: 17,012; Referee: Jarred Gillett |

| 12 March 2022 35 | Blackpool | 1–0 | Swansea City | Blackpool |
| 15:00 GMT | Madine 4' | Report | Downes (yellow card) 37'; Naughton (yellow card) 90+3' | Stadium: Bloomfield Road; Attendance: 12,344; Referee: Steve Martin |

| 16 March 2022 36 | Peterborough United | 2–3 | Swansea City | Peterborough |
| 19:45 GMT | Szmodics 51'; Knight (yellow card) 56'; Marriott 63' | Report | Obafemi 44', 71'; Christie (yellow card) 48'; Wolf (yellow card) 56'; Cabango (yellow card) 77'; Naughton (yellow card) 88'; Piroe 90+1', (yellow card) 90+9' | Stadium: Weston Homes Stadium; Referee: Oliver Langford |

| 19 March 2022 37 | Swansea City | 0–0 | Birmingham City | Landore |
| 15:00 GMT | | Report | | Stadium: Swansea.com Stadium; Attendance: 18,620; Referee: Andy Davies |

| 2 April 2022 38 | Cardiff City | 0–4 | Swansea City | Leckwith |
| 15:00 BST | Doyle (yellow card) 39'; Ralls (yellow card) 80' | Report | Obafemi 6', 82'; Wolf (yellow card) 29', (goal) 78'; Cabango 57'; Fisher (yellow card) 59'; Downes (yellow card) 69'; Piroe (yellow card) 80' | Stadium: Cardiff City Stadium; Attendance: 27,280; Referee: Josh Smith |

| 5 April 2022 39 | Millwall | 0–1 | Swansea City | Bermondsey |
| 19:45 BST | Ballard (yellow card) 81' | Report | Grimes (yellow card) 22'; Piroe 46'; Latibeaudiere (yellow card) 49' | Stadium: The Den; Attendance: 11,670; Referee: Andy Davies |

| 9 April 2022 40 | Swansea City | 2–1 | Derby County | Landore |
| 15:00 BST | Piroe 8', 16' | Report | Lawrence 22' (pen.) | Stadium: Swansea.com Stadium; Attendance: 18,374; Referee: Tim Robinson |

| 15 April 2022 41 | Swansea City | 1–1 | Barnsley | Landore |
| 15:00 BST | Ntcham 64'; Grimes (yellow card) 90+2' | Report | Wolfe (yellow card) 16'; Palmer (yellow card) 29'; Gomes 54'; Morris (yellow card) 78' | Stadium: Swansea.com Stadium; Attendance: 17,923; Referee: Andy Woolmer |

| 18 April 2022 42 | Reading | 4–4 | Swansea City | Reading |
| 15:00 BST | João 3' (pen.), 71'; Ince 61'; McIntyre 90+5' | Report | Wolf 6'; Piroe 12', 45+2' (pen.); Obafemi 58' | Stadium: Madejski Stadium; Referee: Kevin Friend |

| 23 April 2022 43 | Swansea City | 1–1 | Middlesbrough | Landore |
| 15:00 BST | Obafemi 48'; Wolf (yellow card) 84'; Christie (yellow card) 87' | Report | McGree 46'; Bamba (yellow card) 82' | Stadium: Swansea.com Stadium; Attendance: 18,246; Referee: David Webb |

| 26 April 2022 44 | Swansea City | 3–3 | Bournemouth | Landore |
| 19:45 BST | Piroe 5', 12'; Christie (yellow card) 45+4', (goal) 58'; Smith (yellow card) 53' | Report | Lowe (yellow card) 30'; Anthony (yellow card) 56'; Phillips (yellow card) 67'; Moore 72', 90'; Billing (yellow card) 75'; Solanke 81' (pen.), (yellow card) 90+6'; Lerma (yellow card) 84' | Stadium: Swansea.com Stadium; Attendance: 17,780; Referee: Darren Bond |

| 30 April 2022 45 | Nottingham Forest | 5–1 | Swansea City | West Bridgford |
| 15:00 BST | Christie 22' (o.g.); Surridge 48', 52', 69'; Mighten 84' | Report | Christie (yellow card) 24'; Obafemi 28'; Latibeaudiere (yellow card) 38' | Stadium: The City Ground; Attendance: 28,659; Referee: Graham Scott |

| 7 May 2022 46 | Swansea City | 0–1 | Queens Park Rangers | Landore |
| 12:30 BST | | Report | Gray 80' | Stadium: Swansea.com Stadium; Attendance: 18,608; Referee: Steve Martin |

=== FA Cup ===
The Swans were drawn at home to Southampton in the third round.

| 8 January 2022 Third round | Swansea City | 2–3 (a.e.t.) | Southampton | Landore |
| 17:30 GMT | Bennett (yellow card) 43'; Cooper (yellow card) 45+1'; Walsh (yellow card) 59'; Piroe 77'; Dhanda (yellow card) 90+4'; Bednarek 94' (o.g.) | Report | Valery (yellow card) 3' (yellow-red card) 29'; Redmond 8'; Stephens (yellow card) 90+3'; Elyounoussi 96'; Long 102' | Stadium: Swansea.com Stadium; Attendance: 0 (Behind-closed-doors); Referee: Graham Scott |
Note: Live on BBC One Wales

=== EFL Cup ===
Swansea City were drawn away to Reading in the first round, At home to Plymouth Argyle in the second round and away to Brighton & Hove Albion in the third round.

| 10 August 2021 First round | Reading | 0–3 | Swansea City | Reading |
| 20:00 BST | | Report | Latibeaudiere 16'; Cabango 60'; Piroe 83' | Stadium: Madejski Stadium; Attendance: 4,989; Referee: Sam Barrott |

| 24 August 2021 Second round | Swansea City | 4–1 | Plymouth Argyle | Landore |
| 19:00 BST | Williams 29'; Whittaker 79', 86', 90' | Report | Shirley 63' | Stadium: Swansea.com Stadium; Attendance: 7,491; Referee: Bobby Madley |

| 22 September 2021 Third round | Brighton & Hove Albion | 2–0 | Swansea City | Falmer |
| 19:30 BST | Connolly 33', 38' | Report | | Stadium: Amex Stadium; Referee: Michael Salisbury |

== Statistics ==
As of 2 November 2021
Players with names in italics and marked * were on loan from another club for the whole of their season with Swansea City.

| No. | Pos | Nat | Player | Total | | Championship | | FA Cup | | EFL Cup | |
| No. | Pos | Nat | Player | Apps | Goals | Apps | Goals | Apps | Goals | Apps | Goals |
|---|---|---|---|---|---|---|---|---|---|---|---|
| 1 | GK | (Germany) GER | Steven Benda | 7 | 0 | 5+0 | 0 | 0+0 | 0 | 2+0 | 0 |
| 2 | DF | (England) ENG | Ryan Bennett | 11 | 0 | 10+0 | 0 | 0+0 | 0 | 1+0 | 0 |
| 3 | DF | (Republic of Ireland) IRL | Ryan Manning | 17 | 0 | 13+1 | 0 | 0+0 | 0 | 1+2 | 0 |
| 4 | MF | (England) ENG | Flynn Downes | 13 | 0 | 10+2 | 0 | 0+0 | 0 | 0+1 | 0 |
| 5 | DF | (Wales) WAL | Ben Cabango | 13 | 1 | 8+3 | 0 | 0+0 | 0 | 2+0 | 1 |
| 6 | MF | (Scotland) SCO | Jay Fulton | 6 | 0 | 3+1 | 0 | 0+0 | 0 | 2+0 | 0 |
| 7 | MF | (England) ENG | Korey Smith | 10 | 0 | 7+2 | 0 | 0+0 | 0 | 1+0 | 0 |
| 8 | MF | (England) ENG | Matt Grimes | 17 | 0 | 16+0 | 0 | 0+0 | 0 | 1+0 | 0 |
| 9 | FW | (Republic of Ireland) IRL | Michael Obafemi | 6 | 1 | 1+5 | 1 | 0+0 | 0 | 0+0 | 0 |
| 10 | FW | (France) FRA | Olivier Ntcham | 10 | 2 | 7+3 | 2 | 0+0 | 0 | 0+0 | 0 |
| 11 | FW | (England) ENG | Morgan Whittaker | 8 | 3 | 0+5 | 0 | 0+0 | 0 | 3+0 | 3 |
| 12 | MF | (England) ENG | Jamie Paterson | 16 | 6 | 15+1 | 6 | 0+0 | 0 | 0+0 | 0 |
| 14 | FW | (Scotland) SCO | Kyle Joseph | 2 | 0 | 0+0 | 0 | 0+0 | 0 | 1+1 | 0 |
| 16 | DF | (Wales) WAL | Brandon Cooper | 7 | 0 | 3+1 | 0 | 0+0 | 0 | 2+1 | 0 |
| 17 | FW | (Netherlands) NED | Joël Piroe | 16 | 10 | 12+3 | 9 | 0+0 | 0 | 1+0 | 1 |
| 18 | GK | (England) ENG | Ben Hamer | 12 | 0 | 11+0 | 0 | 0+0 | 0 | 1+0 | 0 |
| 20 | FW | (Wales) WAL | Liam Cullen | 11 | 0 | 4+6 | 0 | 0+0 | 0 | 1+0 | 0 |
| 21 | MF | (England) ENG | Yan Dhanda | 6 | 0 | 1+2 | 0 | 0+0 | 0 | 2+1 | 0 |
| 22 | DF | (England) ENG | Joel Latibeaudiere | 12 | 1 | 7+2 | 0 | 0+0 | 0 | 3+0 | 1 |
| 24 | DF | (England) ENG | Jake Bidwell | 16 | 2 | 13+0 | 2 | 0+0 | 0 | 3+0 | 0 |
| 26 | DF | (England) ENG | Kyle Naughton | 14 | 0 | 11+1 | 0 | 0+0 | 0 | 1+1 | 0 |
| 28 | MF | (England) ENG | Liam Walsh | 4 | 0 | 1+2 | 0 | 0+0 | 0 | 1+0 | 0 |
| 35 | DF | (England) ENG | Lincoln McFayden | 1 | 0 | 0+0 | 0 | 0+0 | 0 | 0+1 | 0 |
| 37 | MF | (Wales) WAL | Daniel Williams | 2 | 0 | 0+0 | 0 | 0+0 | 0 | 2+0 | 0 |
| 46 | DF | (England) ENG | Rhys Williams * | 4 | 0 | 2+1 | 0 | 0+0 | 0 | 1+0 | 0 |
| 59 | FW | (England) ENG | Tarrelle Whittaker | 1 | 0 | 0+0 | 0 | 0+0 | 0 | 1+0 | 0 |
Players who left the club:
| 10 | FW | (Jamaica) JAM | Jamal Lowe | 6 | 1 | 3+2 | 0 | 0+0 | 0 | 1+0 | 1 |
| 27 | DF | (England) ENG | Ethan Laird * | 16 | 0 | 13+2 | 0 | 0+0 | 0 | 0+1 | 0 |

== Transfers ==
=== Transfers in ===
| Date | Position | Nationality | Name | From | Fee | Ref. |
|---|---|---|---|---|---|---|
| 11 June 2021 | CF | (Scotland) | Kyle Joseph | (England) Wigan Athletic | Undisclosed | |
| 1 July 2021 | GK | (Denmark) | Nicholas Defreitas-Hansen | (England) Everton | Free transfer | |
| 2 July 2021 | CF | (Netherlands) | Joël Piroe | (Netherlands) PSV Eindhoven | Undisclosed | |
| 7 July 2021 | MF | (England) | Azeem Abdulai | (England) Leicester City | Free transfer | |
| 7 July 2021 | MF | (England) | Richard Faakye | (England) Crystal Palace | Free transfer | |
| 7 July 2021 | GK | (Wales) | Ben Hughes | (England) Chippenham Town | Undisclosed | |
| 7 July 2021 | DF | (England) | Filip Lissah | (England) Chelsea | Free transfer | |
| 7 July 2021 | CB | (Wales) | Ben Margetson | (Wales) Cardiff City | Free transfer | |
| 7 July 2021 | MF | (England) | Sam Leverett | (England) Leeds United | Free transfer | |
| 7 July 2021 | DF | (England) | Zane Myers | (England) Chelsea | Free transfer | |
| 7 July 2021 | FW | (England) | Kieran Petrie | (England) Arsenal | Free transfer | |
| 7 July 2021 | DF | (England) | David Roberts | (England) Chelsea | Free transfer | |
| 7 July 2021 | MF | (England) | Charlie Veevers | (England) Manchester United | Free transfer | |
| 7 July 2021 | LW | (England) | Tarrelle Whittaker | (England) Tottenham Hotspur | Free transfer | |
| 7 July 2021 | FW | (England) | Kyrell Wilson | (England) Chelsea | Free transfer | |
| 8 July 2021 | CM | (England) | Liam Walsh | (England) Bristol City | Free transfer | |
| 6 August 2021 | AM | (England) | Jamie Paterson | (England) Bristol City | Free transfer | |
| 10 August 2021 | CM | (England) | Flynn Downes | (England) Ipswich Town | Undisclosed | |
| 20 August 2021 | CF | (England) | Jaden Forrester | (England) Wolverhampton Wanderers | Free transfer | |
| 20 August 2021 | AM | (England) | Dylan Morgan | (England) Forest Green Rovers | Free transfer | |
| 31 August 2021 | CF | (Republic of Ireland) | Michael Obafemi | (England) Southampton | Undisclosed | |
| 1 September 2021 | CM | (France) | Olivier Ntcham | (Scotland) Celtic | Free transfer | |
| 10 January 2022 | MF | (Wales) | Corey Hurford | (Wales) Briton Ferry Llansawel | Undisclosed | |
| 10 January 2022 | RB | (Wales) | Joe Thomas | (Wales) Cambrian & Clydach Vale | Undisclosed | |
| 11 January 2022 | GK | (England) | Andy Fisher | (England) Milton Keynes Dons | Undisclosed | |
| 31 January 2022 | LB | (England) | Nathanael Ogbeta | (England) Shrewsbury Town | Undisclosed | |
| 1 February 2022 | CB | (England) | Jack Stafford | (Republic of Ireland) Waterford | Undisclosed | |

=== Loans in ===
| Date from | Position | Nationality | Name | From | Date until | Ref. |
|---|---|---|---|---|---|---|
| 16 August 2021 | RB | (England) | Ethan Laird | (England) Manchester United | 6 January 2022 | (Note: On 6 January, Ethan was recalled to parent club Manchester United.) |
| 31 August 2021 | CB | (England) | Rhys Williams | (England) Liverpool | End of season | |
| 13 January 2022 | RB | (Republic of Ireland) | Cyrus Christie | (England) Fulham | End of season | |
| 20 January 2022 | AM | (Austria) | Hannes Wolf | (Germany) Borussia Mönchengladbach | End of season | |
| 30 January 2022 | CB | (England) | Finley Burns | (England) Manchester City | End of season | |

=== Loans out ===
| Date from | Position | Nationality | Name | To | Date until | Ref. |
|---|---|---|---|---|---|---|
| 10 August 2021 | GK | (England) | Josh Gould | (England) Ebbsfleet United | 17 January 2022 | |
| 19 August 2021 | RW | (Jamaica) | Jordon Garrick | (England) Plymouth Argyle | End of season | |
| 31 August 2021 | AM | (Wales) | Ollie Cooper | (Wales) Newport County | End of season | |
| 31 August 2021 | CF | (Scotland) | Kyle Joseph | (England) Cheltenham Town | 5 January 2022 | (Note: On 5 January 2022, Kyle Joseph was recalled from his loan spell at Cheltenham Town.) |
| 1 January 2022 | RW | (England) | Morgan Whittaker | (England) Lincoln City | End of season | |
| 11 January 2022 | GK | (Germany) | Steven Benda | (England) Peterborough United | End of season | |
| 13 January 2022 | CF | (Wales) | Liam Cullen | (England) Lincoln City | End of season | |
| 16 January 2022 | GK | (Wales) | Lewis Webb | (Republic of Ireland) Shelbourne | 31 December 2022 | |
| 17 January 2022 | CM | (Wales) | Daniel Williams | (Republic of Ireland) Dundalk | 31 December 2022 | |
| 29 January 2022 | CB | (Wales) | Brandon Cooper | (England) Swindon Town | End of season | |
| 31 January 2022 | RB | (Wales) | Harry Jones | (Wales) Barry Town United | End of season | |
| 31 January 2022 | CM | (England) | Liam Walsh | (England) Hull City | End of season | |

=== Transfers out ===
| Date | Position | Nationality | Name | To | Fee | Ref. |
|---|---|---|---|---|---|---|
| 11 June 2021 | LB | (Wales) | Declan John | (England) Bolton Wanderers | Released | |
| 30 June 2021 | LW | (Ghana) | André Ayew | (Qatar) Al-Sadd | Released | |
| 30 June 2021 | CM | (Wales) | Ryan Bevan | (Wales) Trefelin | | |
| 30 June 2021 | LB | (Wales) | Matthew Blake | | Released | |
| 30 June 2021 | RB | (Wales) | Kieron Freeman | (England) Portsmouth | Released | |
| 30 June 2021 | RW | (Wales) | Bradley Gibbings | | Released | |
| 30 June 2021 | LB | (Ecuador) | Jordi Govea | | Released | |
| 30 June 2021 | LW | (Scotland) | Barrie McKay | (Scotland) Heart of Midlothian | Released | |
| 30 June 2021 | GK | (England) | Alex Rutter | (England) Poole Town | Released | |
| 30 June 2021 | CB | (Wales) | Jake Thomas | (Wales) Cambrian & Clydach | | |
| 5 July 2021 | FW | (Wales) | Tom Stokes | (Wales) Newport County | Free transfer | |
| 30 July 2021 | RW | (England) | Nathan Dyer | Retired | | |
| 3 August 2021 | CM | (Scotland) | George Byers | (England) Sheffield Wednesday | Undisclosed | |
| 16 August 2021 | CM | (Wales) | Morgan Clarke | (Wales) Merthyr Town | Free transfer | |
| 30 August 2021 | LW | (England) | Wayne Routledge | Retired | | |
| 31 August 2021 | RW | (Jamaica) | Jamal Lowe | (England) Bournemouth | Undisclosed | |
| 31 August 2021 | RB | (Wales) | Connor Roberts | (England) Burnley | Undisclosed | |
| 20 November 2021 | CF | (Iraq) | Ali Al-Hamadi | (England) Wycombe Wanderers | Free transfer | |
| 11 January 2022 | LW | (Nigeria) | Adrian Akande | (England) Reading | Mutual consent | |
| 11 January 2022 | FW | (England) | Kieran Petrie | (England) Queens Park Rangers | Mutual consent | |
| 17 January 2022 | LB | (England) | Jake Bidwell | (England) Coventry City | Free transfer | |
| 31 January 2022 | CB | (Wales) | Ben Margetson | (England) Bromley | Mutual consent | |
