= 2018–19 Southampton F.C. season =

Southampton F.C.
2018–19 season
- Chairman: Ralph Krueger (until 12 April); Martin Semmens (acting, from 12 April)
- Manager: Mark Hughes (until 3 December); Ralph Hasenhüttl (from 5 December)
- Stadium: St Mary's Stadium
- Premier League: 16th
- FA Cup: Third round
- EFL Cup: Fourth round
- Top goalscorer: League: Danny Ings; James Ward-Prowse (7 each); All: Nathan Redmond (9)
- Highest home attendance: 31,890 v Tottenham Hotspur (9 March 2019)
- Lowest home attendance: 14,651 v Derby County (17 January 2019)
- Average home league attendance: 30,138
- Biggest win: 2–0 v Crystal Palace (1 Sep 2018, PL round 4)
- Biggest defeat: 1–6 v Manchester City (4 Nov 2018, PL round 11)
| Home colours | Away colours | Third colours |

The 2018–19 Southampton F.C. season was the club's 20th season in the Premier League and their 42nd in the top division of English football. In addition to the Premier League, the club also competed in the FA Cup and the EFL Cup. Southampton finished the season 16th in the Premier League table with 9 wins, 12 draws and 17 losses. The club were knocked out of the third round of the FA Cup by Championship side Derby County, and were knocked out of the EFL Cup in the fourth round by fellow Premier League team Leicester City. The 2018–19 season was Southampton's last with manager Mark Hughes, who departed on 3 December 2018 with the club in the relegation zone with only one win from fourteen games. Former RB Leipzig manager Ralph Hasenhüttl was appointed as his replacement the next day, after Kelvin Davis took charge of the team's next game.

Following the end of the 2017–18 season, Southampton released a number of players, including first-team defenders Florin Gardoș and Jérémy Pied. The club also sold Serbian midfielder Dušan Tadić to Dutch club Ajax for £10 million. Several players were also brought in during the summer – Scottish midfielder Stuart Armstrong from Premiership champions Celtic for £7 million, Norwegian winger Mohamed Elyounoussi from Swiss side Basel for £16 million, goalkeeper Angus Gunn from Premier League champions Manchester City for £13.5 million, and Danish centre-back Jannik Vestergaard from German club Borussia Mönchengladbach. In August, Liverpool striker Danny Ings joined on an initial loan, with a permanent move planned for the following summer. A number of players were loaned out, including striker Guido Carrillo, playmaker Sofiane Boufal, and midfielder Jordy Clasie.

In the January transfer window, the club sold out-of-favour striker Manolo Gabbiadini to Italian side Sampdoria for an undisclosed fee. Midfielder Steven Davis also returned to his former club Rangers on loan until the end of the season, while Wesley Hoedt and Cédric Soares moved to Celta Vigo and Inter Milan on loan until the end of the season respectively.

== Pre-season ==
Southampton begun their 2018–19 pre-season preparations with a short tour of China, including matches against German club Schalke 04 and local side Jiangsu Suning. The first game ended in a 3–3 draw, with Nathan Redmond, Harrison Reed and Jake Hesketh scoring for the Saints. In the second, the Premier League side edged a 3–2 victory, thanks to goals from Manolo Gabbiadini, Redmond and Sam Gallagher. Returning to England, the club faced Championship side Derby County at Pride Park on 21 July. The lower league hosts subjected the Premier League visitors to their first pre-season defeat with a 3–0 win, goals coming from Tom Lawrence (two) and Mason Bennett. A week later, Southampton beat French side Dijon FCO 2–0, with Shane Long and Gabbiadini securing the win.

The club's final two pre-season games took place at St Mary's Stadium. The first, against Spanish club Celta Vigo, ended 3–2 after a late winner from new signing Mohamed Elyounoussi completed a second-half comeback. Celta Vigo took a 2–0 lead in the first 45 minutes, with goals from Pione Sisto and Iago Aspas giving the hosts a disadvantage to overcome. Shortly after the break, Charlie Austin and Stuart Armstrong struck in a five-minute period to bring the game level, before Elyounoussi's finish gave the Saints the win. The second match took place three days later against German side Borussia Mönchengladbach. The visitors won the game comfortably, with two goals from Patrick Herrmann and a third from Denis Zakaria (both brought on as substitutes) giving them a 3–0 victory.

| 5 July 2018 Friendly | Schalke 04 | 3–3 | Southampton | Kunshan, China |
| 13:05 BST | Konoplyanka 20'; Serdar 55'; Skrzybski 84' | Report | Redmond 45'; Reed 48'; Hesketh 68' | Stadium: Kunshan Sports Centre Stadium |

| 11 July 2018 Friendly | Jiangsu Suning | 2–3 | Southampton | Xuzhou, China |
| 13:05 BST | Zhang Lingfeng 29'; Boakye 35' | Report | Gabbiadini 26'; Redmond 43'; Gallagher 77' | Stadium: Xuzhou Olympic Sports Centre Stadium |

| 21 July 2018 Friendly | Derby County | 3–0 | Southampton | Derby |
| 15:00 BST | Lawrence 58', 71'; Bennett 81' | Report | | Stadium: Pride Park |

| 28 July 2018 Friendly | Dijon FCO | 0–2 | Southampton | Évian-les-Bains, France |
| 14:00 BST | | Report | Long 27'; Gabbiadini 46' | Stadium: Complexe Sportif De Divonne |

| 1 August 2018 Friendly | Southampton | 3–2 | Celta Vigo | Southampton |
| 19:45 BST | Austin 56'; Armstrong 61'; Elyounoussi 90' | Report | Sisto 11'; Aspas 43' | Stadium: St Mary's Stadium; Referee: Andre Marriner |

| 4 August 2018 Friendly | Southampton | 0–3 | Borussia Mönchengladbach | Southampton |
| 15:00 BST | | Report | Herrmann 21', 58'; Zakaria 49' | Stadium: St Mary's Stadium; Referee: Stuart Attwell |

== Premier League ==
=== August–September 2018 ===
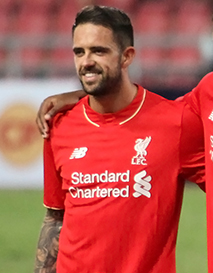
Danny Ings scored twice in his first four league games for the Saints, after joining on loan from Liverpool in the summer transfer window.

Southampton picked up just one point from their first three games of the 2018–19 Premier League campaign, holding Burnley to a goalless draw in their opening fixture. The club lost their following two games 2–1. In the first, against Everton, the Saints were down by two goals within 31 minutes following goals from Theo Walcott and Richarlison. New signing Danny Ings scored his first goal for the club after the break, but the hosts held on for the three points, with Walcott almost doubling his tally late on. The second, against Leicester City, saw few chances for either side in the first 45 minutes. Ryan Bertrand opened the scoring shortly after the break, but his side's lead was cancelled out by Demarai Gray within a few minutes. After Pierre-Emile Højbjerg was sent off, the visitors secured the win in injury time through Harry Maguire. The Saints picked up their first win of the season the following week, beating Crystal Palace 2–0 thanks to second-half goals from Ings and Højbjerg.

Two weeks later, a second consecutive win of the season at home to Brighton & Hove Albion was denied by a penalty in injury time at the end of the game. Højbjerg opened the scoring before half-time with a strike from long range, with Ings adding a second after the break from a penalty awarded for a foul on the striker. Shane Duffy brought the Seagulls back into the game, with Glenn Murray converting an injury time penalty to secure a point for the visitors. The draw with Brighton was followed by three consecutive losses. First, the Saints were beaten 3–0 by a Liverpool side at the top of the league table, with goals from centre-back Joël Matip and striker Mohamed Salah following a tenth-minute own goal by Wesley Hoedt. Next was a 2–0 loss at recently promoted Wolverhampton Wanderers, with goals scored by Ivan Cavaleiro (his first touch in the Premier League) and Jonny Castro Otto within the last 11 minutes of the game. The run left Southampton 16th in the Premier League table.

=== October–December 2018 ===
October started off with another 3–0 loss, at home to title challengers Chelsea. Winger Eden Hazard opened the scoring after half an hour, with Ross Barkley and Álvaro Morata contributing in the second half to the convincing win which left Southampton just two points above the relegation zone and Chelsea second in the table. Southampton's poor form continued, although they remained clear of the drop zone, with a point each from two goalless draws later in October. The first at Bournemouth, featured few chances for either side; the second, at home to Newcastle United, saw the Saints dominate proceedings with 22 shots compared to the Magpies' six. The following week, the Saints suffered their worst defeat in Premier League history, when they lost 6–1 to league champions and leaders Manchester City. Another Hoedt own goal put the visitors down within six minutes, and by the 20th the hosts were three ahead after Sergio Agüero and David Silva added to the scoreline. Ings pulled one back with a first-half penalty, but two goals from Raheem Sterling and one from Leroy Sané ensured a convincing win for the league leaders.

Southampton continued their winless run in the next two games, drawing 1–1 with Watford and losing 3–2 to recently promoted Fulham. In the former, the Saints led through Manolo Gabbiadini's first-half strike, but were denied a two-goal cushion when a goal scored by Charlie Austin was "incorrectly" denied due to offside. José Holebas equalised in the last ten minutes to secure a point for the visitors. Against Fulham, a first goal for Stuart Armstrong put his side ahead, but one from Aleksandar Mitrović and one from André Schürrle before the break put the hosts up at half-time. Armstrong scored a second time to equalise for the Saints, but Mitrović responded in kind to secure the win. In their first game of December, Southampton hosted Manchester United and shared the points in a 2–2 draw. The Saints took an unlikely lead within 20 minutes, as Armstrong and Cédric Soares put the hosts two up against the struggling visitors. United responded before half-time, however, with Romelu Lukaku and Ander Herrera levelling the game going into the break. A second half of few chances left both sides picking up a point for the game, and Southampton without a win in three months.

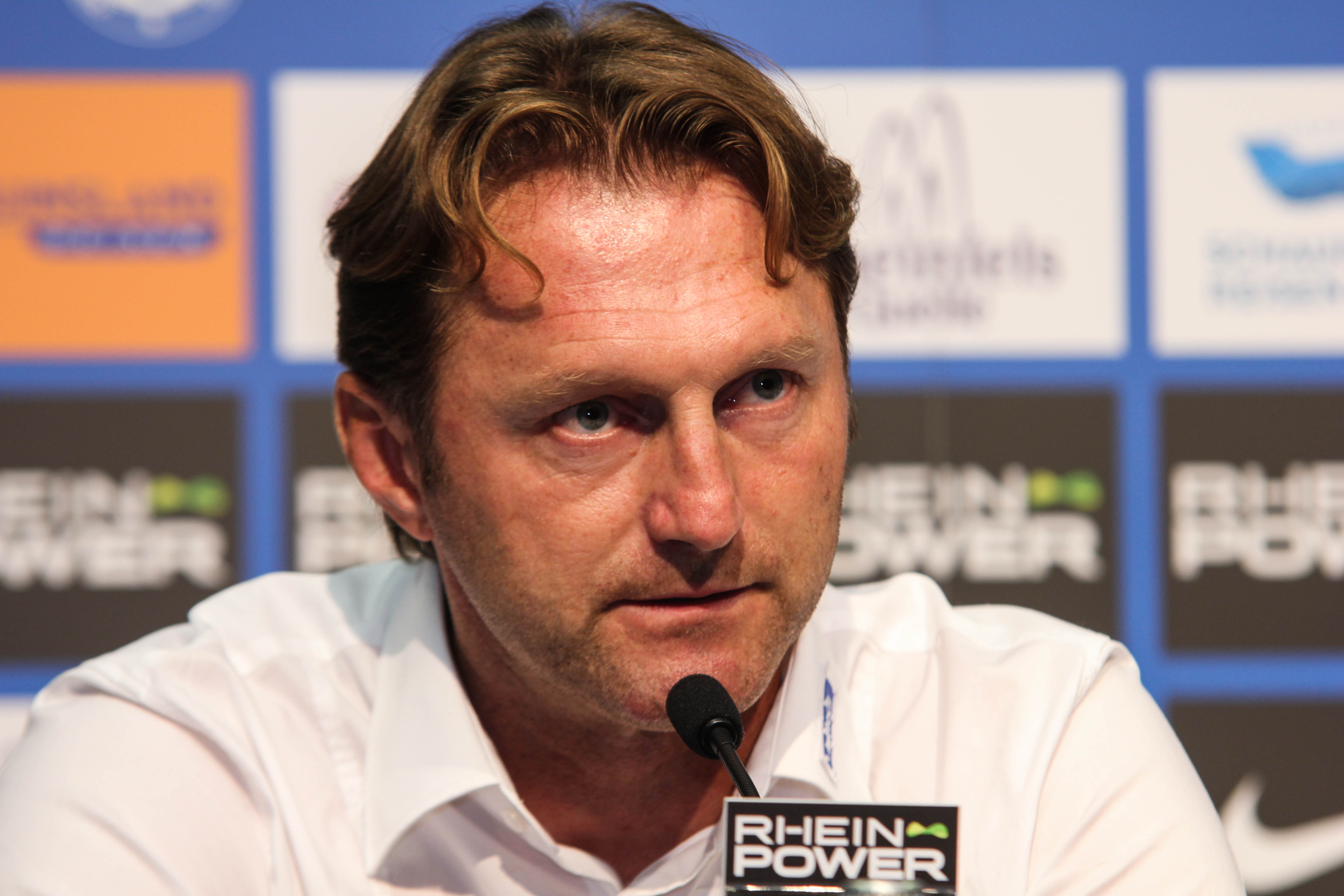
Ralph Hasenhüttl took over from the sacked Mark Hughes as Southampton manager on 5 December 2018.

On 3 December 2018, Mark Hughes was sacked as the manager of Southampton. Assistant first-team coach Kelvin Davis took charge of the team at Wembley Stadium against Tottenham Hotspur two days later, which ended 3–1 to the hosts. Despite Harry Kane opening the scoring within the first ten minutes, it took until the second half for Spurs to score again, which they did through Lucas Moura and Son Heung-min within ten minutes of the restart to go three up. Austin scored a consolation goal for the Saints in injury time, but the loss left them in the relegation zone. Former Leipzig boss Ralph Hasenhüttl was named as Southampton's new manager before the Tottenham game, with his first match in charge to be the fixture against Cardiff City on 8 December. Hasenhüttl's first game at the club ended in a loss, with Callum Paterson scoring the only goal of the match late on to send the Saints down to 19th in the league table, three points away from safety.

In Hasenhüttl's first home game, Southampton beat Arsenal 3–2. Danny Ings headed in a cross from Matt Targett within 20 minutes, although Henrikh Mkhitaryan responded with an equalising header just eight minutes later. Before half-time, Ings scored a second to put the hosts back in front, although less than ten minutes after the break Mkhitaryan responded in kind to level it for the visitors again. Shane Long saw a late goal disallowed, but later set up Charlie Austin to score the winner in the 85th minute; Southampton's first win since September saw them move out of the relegation zone for the first time in three weeks. The following week, the Saints beat fellow strugglers Huddersfield Town 3–1 away to pick up a second consecutive league win for the first time since April 2017. Nathan Redmond opened the scoring with his first goal of the season after 15 minutes, and Ings doubled the lead just before half-time with a penalty after being brought down in the box. Within 15 minutes of the restart, a long-range effort from Philip Billing brought the hosts back into the game, however a first goal for young striker Michael Obafemi just five minutes after coming on gave Southampton back their two-goal lead.

On 27 December, the club lost 2–1 at home to West Ham United. After a first half of few chances, Nathan Redmond scored for the second game running just after the break to put the hosts ahead. However, within ten minutes the Hammers had responded twice through Felipe Anderson, ending Southampton's short winning run. In their final game of 2018, Southampton hosted Premier League champions Manchester City, losing 3–1. David Silva opened the scoring after ten minutes, but Pierre-Emile Højbjerg responded 25 minutes later to equalise for the hosts. On the stroke of half-time, however, a shot from Raheem Sterling was deflected into his own goal by James Ward-Prowse, and in injury time a back-post header from Sergio Agüero made it 3–1. Southampton were unable to mount a comeback in the second half, and Højbjerg was shown a straight red card five minutes from full-time for a tackle on Fernandinho. The loss left the Saints out of the relegation zone on goal difference only.

=== January–March 2019 ===
In their first fixture of 2019, Southampton were held to a goalless draw by Chelsea. The hosts dominated possession throughout the game, but despite 17 shots were unable to find a way through the defence. In the best chances of the game, Eden Hazard saw his shot saved by Angus Gunn, while Álvaro Morata's second-half goal was disallowed for offside. Two weeks later, the Saints picked up a 2–1 win over Leicester City. The visitors opened the scoring early through a James Ward-Prowse penalty, after Nampalys Mendy fouled Shane Long in the box. On the stroke of half-time, however, Yan Valery was sent off for a second yellow card after a foul on Marc Albrighton. Long doubled Southampton's lead in injury time before the break, before Wilfred Ndidi scored a consolation goal for the hosts in the second half.

=== League table ===
| Pos | Team | Pld | W | D | L | GF | GA | GD | Pts | Qualification or relegation |
|---|---|---|---|---|---|---|---|---|---|---|
| 14 | Bournemouth | 38 | 13 | 6 | 19 | 56 | 70 | −14 | 45 | |
| 15 | Burnley | 38 | 11 | 7 | 20 | 45 | 68 | −23 | 40 | |
| 16 | Southampton | 38 | 9 | 12 | 17 | 45 | 65 | −20 | 39 | |
| 17 | Brighton & Hove Albion | 38 | 9 | 9 | 20 | 35 | 60 | −25 | 36 | |
| 18 | Cardiff City (R) | 38 | 10 | 4 | 24 | 34 | 69 | −35 | 34 | Relegation to EFL Championship |

Source: Premier League
Rules for classification: 1) Points; 2) Goal difference; 3) Goals scored; 4) Play-offs (only if needed to decide champion, teams for relegation or teams for UEFA competitions).
(R) Relegated

=== Results by matchday ===
| Matchday | 1 | 2 | 3 | 4 | 5 | 6 | 7 | 8 | 9 | 10 | 11 | 12 | 13 | 14 | 15 | 16 | 17 | 18 | 19 | 20 | 21 | 22 | 23 | 24 | 25 | 26 | 27 | 28 | 29 | 30 | 31 | 32 | 33 | 34 | 35 | 36 | 37 | 38 |
|---|---|---|---|---|---|---|---|---|---|---|---|---|---|---|---|---|---|---|---|---|---|---|---|---|---|---|---|---|---|---|---|---|---|---|---|---|---|---|
| Ground | H | A | H | A | H | A | A | H | A | H | A | H | A | H | A | A | H | A | H | H | A | A | H | H | A | H | A | H | A | H | A | H | H | A | A | H | A | H |
| Result | D | L | L | W | D | L | L | L | D | D | L | D | L | D | L | L | W | W | L | L | D | W | W | D | D | L | L | W | L | W | W | L | W | L | D | D | L | D |
| Position | 12 | 12 | 17 | 12 | 13 | 14 | 16 | 16 | 16 | 16 | 16 | 17 | 17 | 18 | 18 | 19 | 17 | 16 | 16 | 17 | 18 | 16 | 15 | 16 | 16 | 18 | 18 | 17 | 17 | 16 | 16 | 16 | 16 | 16 | 16 | 16 | 16 | 16 |

Updated to match(es) played on 12 May 2019. Source: BBC Sport
A = Away; H = Home; W = Win; D = Draw; L = Loss

=== Match results ===
| 12 August 2018 1 | Southampton | 0–0 | Burnley | Southampton |
| 13:30 BST | | Report | | Stadium: St Mary's Stadium; Attendance: 30,784; Referee: Graham Scott |

| 18 August 2018 2 | Everton | 2–1 | Southampton | Liverpool |
| 15:00 BST | Walcott 15'; Richarlison 31' | Report | Ings 54' | Stadium: Goodison Park; Attendance: 38,601; Referee: Lee Mason |

| 25 August 2018 3 | Southampton | 1–2 | Leicester City | Southampton |
| 15:00 BST | Bertrand 52' | Report | Gray 56'; Maguire 90+2' | Stadium: St Mary's Stadium; Attendance: 29,925; Referee: Jonathan Moss |

| 1 September 2018 4 | Crystal Palace | 0–2 | Southampton | London |
| 15:00 BST | | Report | Ings 47'; Højbjerg 90+2' | Stadium: Selhurst Park; Attendance: 25,495; Referee: Martin Atkinson |

| 17 September 2018 5 | Southampton | 2–2 | Brighton & Hove Albion | Southampton |
| 20:00 BST | Højbjerg 35'; Ings 64' (pen.) | Report | Duffy 67'; Murray 90+1' (pen.) | Stadium: St Mary's Stadium; Attendance: 28,811; Referee: Anthony Taylor |

| 22 September 2018 6 | Liverpool | 3–0 | Southampton | Liverpool |
| 15:00 BST | Hoedt 10' (o.g.); Matip 21'; Salah 45+3' | Report | | Stadium: Anfield; Attendance: 50,965; Referee: Paul Tierney |

| 29 September 2018 7 | Wolverhampton Wanderers | 2–0 | Southampton | Wolverhampton |
| 15:00 BST | Cavaleiro 79'; Jonny 87' | Report | | Stadium: Molineux Stadium; Attendance: 31,147; Referee: Stuart Attwell |

| 7 October 2018 8 | Southampton | 0–3 | Chelsea | Southampton |
| 14:15 BST | | Report | Hazard 30'; Barkley 57'; Morata 90+3' | Stadium: St Mary's Stadium; Attendance: 27,077; Referee: Craig Pawson |

| 20 October 2018 9 | Bournemouth | 0–0 | Southampton | Bournemouth |
| 15:00 BST | | Report | | Stadium: Dean Court; Attendance: 10,986; Referee: Lee Probert |

| 27 October 2018 10 | Southampton | 0–0 | Newcastle United | Southampton |
| 15:00 BST | | Report | | Stadium: St Mary's Stadium; Attendance: 30,736; Referee: Chris Kavanagh |

| 4 November 2018 11 | Manchester City | 6–1 | Southampton | Manchester |
| 15:00 GMT | Hoedt 6' (o.g.); Agüero 12'; D. Silva 18'; Sterling 45+2', 67'; Sané 90+1' | Report | Ings 29' (pen.) | Stadium: City of Manchester Stadium; Attendance: 53,916; Referee: Lee Mason |

| 10 November 2018 12 | Southampton | 1–1 | Watford | Southampton |
| 15:00 GMT | Gabbiadini 20' | Report | Holebas 82' | Stadium: St Mary's Stadium; Attendance: 28,153; Referee: Simon Hooper |

| 24 November 2018 13 | Fulham | 3–2 | Southampton | London |
| 15:00 GMT | Mitrović 33', 63'; Schürrle 43' | Report | Armstrong 18', 53' | Stadium: Craven Cottage; Attendance: 24,603; Referee: Michael Oliver |

| 1 December 2018 14 | Southampton | 2–2 | Manchester United | Southampton |
| 17:30 GMT | Armstrong 13'; Cédric 20' | Report | Lukaku 33'; Herrera 39' | Stadium: St Mary's Stadium; Attendance: 30,187; Referee: Kevin Friend |

| 5 December 2018 15 | Tottenham Hotspur | 3–1 | Southampton | London |
| 20:00 GMT | Kane 9'; Moura 51'; Son Heung-min 55' | Report | Austin 90+3' | Stadium: Wembley Stadium; Attendance: 33,012; Referee: Anthony Taylor |

| 8 December 2018 16 | Cardiff City | 1–0 | Southampton | Cardiff |
| 15:00 GMT | Paterson 74' | Report | | Stadium: Cardiff City Stadium; Attendance: 30,067; Referee: Jonathan Moss |

| 16 December 2018 17 | Southampton | 3–2 | Arsenal | Southampton |
| 13:30 GMT | Ings 20', 44'; Austin 85' | Report | Mkhitaryan 28', 53' | Stadium: St Mary's Stadium; Attendance: 29,497; Referee: Chris Kavanagh |

| 22 December 2018 18 | Huddersfield Town | 1–3 | Southampton | Huddersfield |
| 15:00 GMT | Billing 58' | Report | Redmond 15'; Ings 42' (pen.); Obafemi 71' | Stadium: John Smith's Stadium; Attendance: 22,384; Referee: Stuart Attwell |

| 27 December 2018 19 | Southampton | 1–2 | West Ham United | Southampton |
| 19:45 GMT | Redmond 50' | Report | Anderson 53', 59' | Stadium: St Mary's Stadium; Attendance: 31,654; Referee: Craig Pawson |

| 30 December 2018 20 | Southampton | 1–3 | Manchester City | Southampton |
| 14:15 GMT | Højbjerg 37' | Report | D. Silva 10'; Ward-Prowse 45' (o.g.); Agüero 45+3' | Stadium: St Mary's Stadium; Attendance: 31,381; Referee: Paul Tierney |

| 2 January 2019 21 | Chelsea | 0–0 | Southampton | Fulham |
| 19:45 GMT | | Report | | Stadium: Stamford Bridge; Attendance: 40,668; Referee: Jonathan Moss |

| 12 January 2019 22 | Leicester City | 1–2 | Southampton | Leicester |
| 15:00 GMT | Ndidi 58' | Report | Ward-Prowse 11' (pen.); Long 45+2' | Stadium: King Power Stadium; Attendance: 31,491; Referee: Michael Oliver |

| 19 January 2019 23 | Southampton | 2–1 | Everton | Southampton |
| 15:00 GMT | Ward-Prowse 50'; Digne 64' (o.g.) | Report | Sigurðsson 90+1' | Stadium: St Mary's Stadium; Attendance: 29,989; Referee: Graham Scott |

| 30 January 2019 24 | Southampton | 1–1 | Crystal Palace | Southampton |
| 19:45 GMT | Ward-Prowse 77' | Report | Zaha 41' | Stadium: St Mary's Stadium; Attendance: 28,339; Referee: Andre Marriner |

| 2 February 2019 25 | Burnley | 1–1 | Southampton | Burnley |
| 15:00 GMT | Barnes 90+4' (pen.) | Report | Redmond 55' | Stadium: Turf Moor; Attendance: 19,787; Referee: Anthony Taylor |

| 9 February 2019 26 | Southampton | 1–2 | Cardiff City | Southampton |
| 15:00 GMT | Stephens 90+1' | Report | Bamba 69'; Zohore 90+3' | Stadium: St Mary's Stadium; Attendance: 31,438; Referee: Martin Atkinson |

| 24 February 2019 27 | Arsenal | 2–0 | Southampton | Holloway |
| 14:05 GMT | Lacazette 6'; Mkhitaryan 17' | Report | | Stadium: Emirates Stadium; Attendance: 59,877; Referee: Graham Scott |

| 27 February 2019 28 | Southampton | 2–0 | Fulham | Southampton |
| 19:45 GMT | Romeu 23'; Ward-Prowse 41' | Report | | Stadium: St Mary's Stadium; Attendance: 27,597; Referee: Anthony Taylor |

| 2 March 2019 29 | Manchester United | 3–2 | Southampton | Greater Manchester |
| 15:00 GMT | Pereira 53'; Lukaku 59', 88' | Report | Valery 26'; Ward-Prowse 75' | Stadium: Old Trafford; Attendance: 74,459; Referee: Stuart Attwell |

| 9 March 2019 30 | Southampton | 2–1 | Tottenham Hotspur | Southampton |
| 15:00 GMT | Valery 76'; Ward-Prowse 81' | Report | Kane 26' | Stadium: St Mary's Stadium; Attendance: 31,890; Referee: Kevin Friend |

| 30 March 2019 31 | Brighton & Hove Albion | 0–1 | Southampton | Falmer |
| 15:00 GMT | | Report | Højbjerg 53' | Stadium: Falmer Stadium; Attendance: 30,636; Referee: Michael Oliver |

| 5 April 2019 32 | Southampton | 1–3 | Liverpool | Southampton |
| 20:00 BST | Long 9' | Report | Keïta 36'; Salah 80'; Henderson 86' | Stadium: St Mary's Stadium; Attendance: 31,797; Referee: Paul Tierney |

| 13 April 2019 33 | Southampton | 3–1 | Wolverhampton Wanderers | Southampton |
| 15:00 BST | Redmond 2', 30'; Long 71' | Report | Boly 28' | Stadium: St Mary's Stadium; Attendance: 31,708; Referee: Jonathan Moss |

| 20 April 2019 34 | Newcastle United | 3–1 | Southampton | Newcastle-upon-Tyne |
| 17:30 BST | Pérez 27', 31', 86' | Report | Lemina 59' | Stadium: St James' Park; Attendance: 52,191; Referee: Anthony Taylor |

| 23 April 2019 35 | Watford | 1–1 | Southampton | Watford |
| 19:45 BST | Gray 90' | Report | Long 1' | Stadium: Vicarage Road; Attendance: 19,170; Referee: Mike Dean |

| 27 April 2019 36 | Southampton | 3–3 | Bournemouth | Southampton |
| 15:00 BST | Long 12'; Ward-Prowse 55'; Targett 67' | Report | Gosling 20'; Wilson 32', 86' | Stadium: St Mary's Stadium; Attendance: 31,310; Referee: Graham Scott |

| 4 May 2019 37 | West Ham United | 3–0 | Southampton | London |
| 15:00 BST | Arnautović 16', 69'; Fredericks 72' | Report | | Stadium: London Stadium; Attendance: 59,961; Referee: Stuart Attwell |

| 12 May 2019 38 | Southampton | 1–1 | Huddersfield Town | Southampton |
| 15:00 BST | Redmond 41' | Report | Pritchard 55' | Stadium: St Mary's Stadium; Attendance: 30,367; Referee: Lee Probert |

== FA Cup ==
Southampton will enter the 2018–19 FA Cup in the third round against Championship side Derby County.

| 5 January 2019 Third round | Derby County | 2–2 | Southampton | Derby |
| 15:00 GMT | Marriott 58'; Lawrence 61' | Report | Redmond 4', 48' | Stadium: Pride Park Stadium; Attendance: 17,095; Referee: Oliver Langford |

| 16 January 2019 Third round replay | Southampton | 2–2 (a.e.t.) (3–5 p) | Derby County | Southampton |
| 19:45 GMT | Armstrong 68'; Redmond 70' | Report | Wilson 76'; Waghorn 82' | Stadium: St Mary's Stadium; Attendance: 14,651; Referee: Anthony Taylor |
| | Penalties |
| | Ward-Prowse (penalty scored); Redmond (penalty missed); Vestergaard (penalty scored); Targett (penalty scored) | | Waghorn (penalty scored); Nugent (penalty scored); Mount (penalty scored); Lawrence (penalty scored); Keogh (penalty scored) |

== EFL Cup ==
Southampton entered the 2018–19 EFL Cup in the second round, beating fellow Premier League side Brighton & Hove Albion by a single late goal on 28 August. The game was closely fought, with Angus Gunn twice denying Viktor Gyökeres for the hosts. Substitute Charlie Austin had a shot blocked on the line by Bernardo late on, but scored in the 88th minute to secure the first win of the season for the visitors. In the third round, the Saints travelled again to face Everton, to whom they had lost in the league a few weeks prior. Another win looked to be likely for the South Coast club, after a lead secured by Danny Ings before the break remained for most of the second half, however a late response from Theo Walcott sent the game to penalties. Southampton won the penalty shootout 4–3, with Cédric Soares converting the decisive spot kick after Walcott saw his effort saved by Gunn (Richarlison also missed his penalty, while Matt Targett missed for the Saints).

In the fourth round, Southampton travelled again to face Leicester City, another side who had already beaten them in the league. Initially due to take place on 30 October, the fixture was postponed following the death of Leicester's chairman Vichai Srivaddhanaprabha. The visitors enjoyed the majority of chances, most of which came in the second half, with Nathan Redmond and Manolo Gabbiadini both coming close to breaking the goalless deadlock, and Steven Davis seeing a goal disallowed by the video assistant referee due to a handball by Redmond. The game went to penalties, with both sides scoring all five of their initial spot kicks. Gabbiadini failed to score his sudden death penalty, allowing Nampalys Mendy to secure the win for the Foxes.

| 28 August 2018 Second round | Brighton & Hove Albion | 0–1 | Southampton | Falmer |
| 19:45 BST | | Report | Austin 88' | Stadium: Falmer Stadium; Attendance: 13,651; Referee: Andre Marriner |

| 2 October 2018 Third round | Everton | 1–1 (3–4 p) | Southampton | Liverpool |
| 19:45 BST | Walcott 85' | Report | Ings 44' | Stadium: Goodison Park; Attendance: 30,545; Referee: Chris Kavanagh |
| | Penalties |
| | Baines (penalty scored); Tosun (penalty scored); Richarlison (penalty missed); Zouma (penalty scored); Walcott (penalty missed) | | (penalty scored) Ings; (penalty scored) Davis; (penalty scored) Højbjerg; (penalty missed) Targett; (penalty scored) Cédric |

| 27 November 2018 Fourth round | Leicester City | 0–0 (6–5 p) | Southampton | Leicester |
| 19:45 GMT | | Report | | Stadium: King Power Stadium; Attendance: 22,150; Referee: Roger East |
| | Penalties |
| | Fuchs (penalty scored); Albrighton (penalty scored); Söyüncü (penalty scored); Gray (penalty scored); Vardy (penalty scored); Mendy (penalty scored) | | (penalty scored) Davis; (penalty scored) Højbjerg; (penalty scored) Redmond; (penalty scored) Vestergaard; (penalty scored) Cédric; (penalty missed) Gabbiadini |

== Squad statistics ==
As of 12 May 2019

| No. | Pos. | Nat. | Name | League | | FA Cup | | EFL Cup | | Total | | Discipline | |
| No. | Pos. | Nat. | Name | Apps. | Goals | Apps. | Goals | Apps. | Goals | Apps. | Goals | Yellow card | Red card |
|---|---|---|---|---|---|---|---|---|---|---|---|---|---|
| 1 | GK | (England) | Alex McCarthy | 25 | 0 | 0 | 0 | 0 | 0 | 25 | 0 | 1 | 0 |
| 3 | DF | (Japan) | Maya Yoshida | 17 | 0 | 0 | 0 | 3 | 0 | 20 | 0 | 0 | 0 |
| 4 | DF | (Denmark) | Jannik Vestergaard | 23 | 0 | 2 | 0 | 1 | 0 | 26 | 0 | 2 | 0 |
| 5 | DF | (England) | Jack Stephens | 19(5) | 1 | 2 | 0 | 3 | 0 | 24(5) | 1 | 4 | 0 |
| 7 | FW | (Republic of Ireland) | Shane Long | 12(14) | 5 | 2 | 0 | 0 | 0 | 14(14) | 5 | 3 | 0 |
| 9 | FW | (England) | Danny Ings | 23(1) | 7 | 0 | 0 | 1 | 1 | 24(1) | 8 | 1 | 0 |
| 10 | FW | (England) | Charlie Austin | 11(14) | 2 | 1 | 0 | 0(1) | 1 | 12(15) | 3 | 1 | 0 |
| 11 | MF | (Norway) | Mohamed Elyounoussi | 8(8) | 0 | 2 | 0 | 1 | 0 | 11(8) | 0 | 1 | 0 |
| 14 | MF | (Spain) | Oriol Romeu | 25(6) | 1 | 1 | 0 | 1 | 0 | 27(6) | 1 | 11 | 0 |
| 15 | FW | (England) | Sam Gallagher | 0(4) | 0 | 0(1) | 0 | 0(1) | 0 | 0(6) | 0 | 0 | 0 |
| 16 | MF | (England) | James Ward-Prowse | 21(5) | 7 | 2 | 0 | 1 | 0 | 24(5) | 7 | 4 | 0 |
| 17 | MF | (Scotland) | Stuart Armstrong | 16(13) | 3 | 1 | 1 | 2 | 0 | 19(13) | 4 | 2 | 0 |
| 18 | MF | (Gabon) | Mario Lemina | 18(3) | 1 | 0 | 0 | 2 | 0 | 20(3) | 1 | 5 | 0 |
| 21 | DF | (England) | Ryan Bertrand | 24 | 1 | 0 | 0 | 0 | 0 | 24 | 1 | 8 | 0 |
| 22 | MF | (England) | Nathan Redmond | 36(2) | 6 | 1(1) | 3 | 2(1) | 0 | 39(4) | 9 | 3 | 0 |
| 23 | MF | (Denmark) | Pierre-Emile Højbjerg | 31 | 4 | 0 | 0 | 2 | 0 | 33 | 4 | 7 | 2 |
| 28 | GK | (England) | Angus Gunn | 12 | 0 | 2 | 0 | 3 | 0 | 17 | 0 | 0 | 0 |
| 32 | DF | (England) | Alfie Jones | 0 | 0 | 0 | 0 | 0 | 0 | 0 | 0 | 0 | 0 |
| 33 | DF | (England) | Matt Targett | 13(3) | 1 | 1(1) | 0 | 3 | 0 | 17(4) | 1 | 2 | 0 |
| 35 | DF | (Poland) | Jan Bednarek | 24(1) | 0 | 0 | 0 | 2 | 0 | 26(1) | 0 | 9 | 0 |
| 39 | MF | (England) | Josh Sims | 2(5) | 0 | 0 | 0 | 0 | 0 | 2(5) | 0 | 0 | 0 |
| 41 | GK | (England) | Harry Lewis | 0 | 0 | 0 | 0 | 0 | 0 | 0 | 0 | 0 | 0 |
| 43 | DF | (France) | Yan Valery | 20(3) | 2 | 0 | 0 | 1 | 0 | 21(3) | 2 | 3 | 1 |
| 44 | GK | (England) | Fraser Forster | 1 | 0 | 0 | 0 | 0 | 0 | 1 | 0 | 0 | 0 |
| 51 | MF | (England) | Tyreke Johnson | 0(1) | 0 | 1(1) | 0 | 0 | 0 | 1(2) | 0 | 1 | 0 |
| 55 | MF | (England) | Callum Slattery | 1(2) | 0 | 1(1) | 0 | 0 | 0 | 2(3) | 0 | 0 | 0 |
| 61 | FW | (Republic of Ireland) | Michael Obafemi | 1(5) | 1 | 0 | 0 | 1 | 0 | 2(5) | 1 | 1 | 0 |
| 65 | FW | (England) | Marcus Barnes | 0 | 0 | 0(1) | 0 | 0 | 0 | 0(1) | 0 | 0 | 0 |
| 66 | DF | (England) | Kayne Ramsay | 1 | 0 | 1 | 0 | 0 | 0 | 2 | 0 | 0 | 0 |
Players with appearances who left during the season
| 20 | FW | (Italy) | Manolo Gabbiadini | 4(8) | 1 | 0 | 0 | 2(1) | 0 | 6(9) | 1 | 0 | 0 |
Players with appearances who ended the season on loan
| 2 | DF | (Portugal) | Cédric Soares | 16(2) | 1 | 2 | 0 | 1(1) | 0 | 19(3) | 1 | 5 | 0 |
| 6 | DF | (Netherlands) | Wesley Hoedt | 13 | 0 | 0 | 0 | 0 | 0 | 13 | 0 | 2 | 0 |
| 8 | MF | (Northern Ireland) | Steven Davis | 1(2) | 0 | 0 | 0 | 1(2) | 0 | 2(4) | 0 | 1 | 0 |

=== Most appearances ===
As of 12 May 2019

| # | Pos. | Nat. | Name | League | | FA Cup | | EFL Cup | | Total | | |
| # | Pos. | Nat. | Name | Starts | Subs | Starts | Subs | Starts | Subs | Starts | Subs | Total |
|---|---|---|---|---|---|---|---|---|---|---|---|---|
| 1 | MF | (England) | Nathan Redmond | 36 | 2 | 1 | 1 | 2 | 1 | 39 | 4 | 43 |
| 2 | MF | (Denmark) | Pierre-Emile Højbjerg | 31 | 0 | 0 | 0 | 2 | 0 | 33 | 0 | 33 |
| 2 | MF | (Spain) | Oriol Romeu | 26 | 5 | 1 | 0 | 1 | 0 | 28 | 5 | 33 |
| 4 | MF | (Scotland) | Stuart Armstrong | 16 | 13 | 1 | 0 | 2 | 0 | 19 | 13 | 32 |
| 5 | MF | (England) | James Ward-Prowse | 21 | 5 | 2 | 0 | 1 | 0 | 24 | 5 | 29 |
| 5 | DF | (England) | Jack Stephens | 19 | 5 | 2 | 0 | 3 | 0 | 24 | 5 | 29 |
| 7 | FW | (Republic of Ireland) | Shane Long | 12 | 14 | 2 | 0 | 0 | 0 | 14 | 14 | 28 |
| 8 | DF | (Poland) | Jan Bednarek | 24 | 1 | 0 | 0 | 2 | 0 | 26 | 1 | 27 |
| 8 | FW | (England) | Charlie Austin | 11 | 14 | 1 | 0 | 0 | 1 | 12 | 15 | 27 |
| 10 | DF | (Denmark) | Jannik Vestergaard | 23 | 0 | 2 | 0 | 1 | 0 | 26 | 0 | 26 |

=== Top goalscorers ===
As of 12 May 2019

| # | Pos. | Nat. | Name | League | | FA Cup | | EFL Cup | | Total | | |
| # | Pos. | Nat. | Name | Goals | Apps. | Goals | Apps. | Goals | Apps. | Goals | Apps. | GPG |
|---|---|---|---|---|---|---|---|---|---|---|---|---|
| 1 | MF | (England) | Nathan Redmond | 6 | 38 | 3 | 2 | 0 | 3 | 9 | 43 | 0.21 |
| 2 | FW | (England) | Danny Ings | 7 | 24 | 0 | 0 | 1 | 1 | 8 | 25 | 0.32 |
| 3 | MF | (England) | James Ward-Prowse | 7 | 26 | 0 | 2 | 0 | 1 | 7 | 29 | 0.24 |
| 4 | FW | (Republic of Ireland) | Shane Long | 5 | 26 | 0 | 2 | 0 | 0 | 5 | 28 | 0.18 |
| 5 | MF | (Scotland) | Stuart Armstrong | 3 | 29 | 1 | 1 | 0 | 2 | 4 | 32 | 0.13 |
| 5 | MF | (Denmark) | Pierre-Emile Højbjerg | 4 | 31 | 0 | 0 | 0 | 2 | 4 | 33 | 0.12 |
| 7 | FW | (England) | Charlie Austin | 2 | 25 | 0 | 1 | 1 | 1 | 3 | 27 | 0.11 |
| 8 | DF | (France) | Yan Valery | 2 | 23 | 0 | 0 | 0 | 1 | 2 | 24 | 0.08 |
| 9 | FW | (Republic of Ireland) | Michael Obafemi | 1 | 6 | 0 | 0 | 0 | 1 | 1 | 7 | 0.14 |
| 9 | FW | (Italy) | Manolo Gabbiadini | 1 | 12 | 0 | 0 | 0 | 3 | 1 | 15 | 0.07 |
| 9 | DF | (England) | Matt Targett | 1 | 16 | 0 | 2 | 0 | 3 | 1 | 21 | 0.05 |
| 9 | DF | (Portugal) | Cédric Soares | 1 | 18 | 0 | 2 | 0 | 2 | 1 | 22 | 0.05 |
| 9 | MF | (Gabon) | Mario Lemina | 1 | 21 | 0 | 2 | 0 | 0 | 1 | 23 | 0.04 |
| 9 | DF | (England) | Ryan Bertrand | 1 | 24 | 0 | 0 | 0 | 0 | 1 | 24 | 0.04 |
| 9 | DF | (England) | Jack Stephens | 1 | 24 | 0 | 2 | 0 | 3 | 1 | 29 | 0.03 |
| 9 | MF | (Spain) | Oriol Romeu | 1 | 31 | 0 | 1 | 0 | 1 | 1 | 33 | 0.03 |

== Transfers ==
Players transferred in

| Date | Pos. | Name | Club | Fee | Ref. |
|---|---|---|---|---|---|
| 1 July 2018 | MF | (Scotland) Stuart Armstrong | (Scotland) Celtic | £7 million | |
| 1 July 2018 | MF | (Norway) Mohamed Elyounoussi | (Switzerland) Basel | £16 million | |
| 10 July 2018 | GK | (England) Angus Gunn | (England) Manchester City | £13.5 million | |
| 13 July 2018 | DF | (Denmark) Jannik Vestergaard | (Germany) Borussia Mönchengladbach | Undisclosed | |

Players transferred out

| Date | Pos. | Name | Club | Fee | Ref. |
|---|---|---|---|---|---|
| 1 July 2018 | MF | (Serbia) Dušan Tadić | (Netherlands) Ajax | Undisclosed | |
| 11 January 2019 | FW | (Italy) Manolo Gabbiadini | (Italy) Sampdoria | Undisclosed | |
| 23 January 2019 | GK | (England) Adam Parkes | (England) Watford | Undisclosed | |

Players loaned in

| Date | Pos. | Name | Club | Duration | Ref. |
|---|---|---|---|---|---|
| 9 August 2018 | FW | (England) Danny Ings | (England) Liverpool | End of season (Note: Becomes permanent deal for undisclosed fee on 1 July 2019.) | |

Players loaned out

| Date | Pos. | Name | Club | Duration | Ref. |
|---|---|---|---|---|---|
| 8 July 2018 | FW | (Argentina) Guido Carrillo | (Spain) Leganés | End of season | |
| 14 July 2018 | FW | (England) Ryan Seager | (Netherlands) Telstar | 7 January 2019 | |
| 20 July 2018 | MF | (Morocco) Sofiane Boufal | (Spain) Celta Vigo | End of season | |
| 25 July 2018 | MF | (Netherlands) Jordy Clasie | (Netherlands) Feyenoord | End of season | |
| 8 August 2018 | GK | (England) Kingsley Latham | (England) Dorchester Town | End of season | |
| 15 August 2018 | DF | (England) Alfie Jones | (Scotland) St Mirren | 7 January 2019 | |
| 20 August 2018 | MF | (England) Josh Sims | (England) Reading | 7 January 2019 | |
| 27 August 2018 | MF | (England) Harrison Reed | (England) Blackburn Rovers | End of season | |
| 30 August 2018 | MF | (England) Jake Flannigan | (England) Burton Albion | 1 January 2019 | |
| 30 August 2018 | MF | (England) Jake Hesketh | (England) Burton Albion | 1 January 2019 | |
| 30 August 2018 | DF | (England) Sam McQueen | (England) Middlesbrough | End of season | |
| 6 January 2019 | MF | (Northern Ireland) Steven Davis | (Scotland) Rangers | End of season | |
| 18 January 2019 | DF | (England) Ben Rowthorn | (England) Truro City | End of season | |
| 22 January 2019 | DF | (Netherlands) Wesley Hoedt | (Spain) Celta Vigo | End of season | |
| 26 January 2019 | DF | (Portugal) Cédric Soares | (Italy) Inter Milan | End of season | |
| 31 January 2019 | MF | (England) Jake Hesketh | (England) Milton Keynes Dons | End of season | |
| 1 February 2019 | MF | (South Africa) Siph Mdlalose | (England) Salisbury | End of season | |

Players released

| Date | Pos. | Name | Subsequent club | Join date | Ref. |
|---|---|---|---|---|---|
| 30 June 2018 | DF | (Romania) Florin Gardoș | (Romania) Universitatea Craiova | 1 July 2018 | |
| 30 June 2018 | MF | (England) Armani Little | (England) Oxford United | 1 July 2018 | |
| 30 June 2018 | FW | (England) Olufela Olomola | (England) Scunthorpe United | 1 July 2018 | |
| 30 June 2018 | DF | (England) Will Wood | (England) Accrington Stanley | 1 July 2018 | |
| 30 June 2018 | DF | (France) Jérémy Pied | (France) Lille | 15 August 2018 | |
| 30 June 2018 | DF | (England) Ollie Cook | (England) Merstham | 16 September 2018 | |
| 30 June 2018 | DF | (England) Oliver Gardner | (England) Barnstaple Town | 3 October 2018 | |
| 30 June 2018 | DF | (Benin) Richard Bakary | Currently unattached | | |
| 30 June 2018 | DF | (England) Ben Cull | None (retired) | | |
| 30 June 2018 | DF | (England) Javen Siu | None (retired) | | |
| 30 June 2018 | GK | (England) Stuart Taylor | None (retired) | | |
| 29 January 2019 | FW | (England) Ryan Seager | (England) Yeovil Town | 29 January 2019 | |
