= Michael Obafemi =

Irish footballer (born 2000)

Personal information
- Full name: Michael Oluwadurotimi Obafemi
- Date of birth: 6 July 2000 (age 26)
- Place of birth: Dublin, Ireland
- Height: 1.69 m (5 ft 7 in)
- Position: Striker

Team information
- Current team: Burnley
- Number: 45

Youth career
- 2009–2010: Ryan
- 2010–2012: Chelsea
- 2012–2014: Arsenal
- 2014–2015: Watford
- 2015–2016: Leyton Orient
- 2016–2018: Southampton

Senior career*
Years	Team	Apps	(Gls)
2018–2021	Southampton	32	(4)
2021–2023	Swansea City	51	(15)
2023	→ Burnley (loan)	12	(2)
2023–	Burnley	2	(0)
2024	→ Millwall (loan)	14	(2)
2024–2025	→ Plymouth Argyle (loan)	29	(2)
2025–2026	→ VfL Bochum (loan)	2	(0)
2026	→ Blackpool (loan)	5	(0)

International career^{‡}
2017–2018	Republic of Ireland U19	3	(1)
2019–2020	Republic of Ireland U21	5	(0)
2018–2024	Republic of Ireland	12	(2)
- * Club domestic league appearances and goals as of 18:00, 6 May 2026 (UTC) ‡ National team caps and goals as of 21:40, 4 June 2024 (UTC)

Michael Oluwadurotimi Obafemi (born 6 July 2000) is an Irish professional footballer who plays as a striker for EFL Championship club Burnley. He is a Republic of Ireland international.

== Early life ==
Obafemi was born in Dublin to Nigerian parents. While he was still an infant, his family moved to England, and he was raised in the London area. His older brother Afolabi Obafemi was also a footballer.

== Club career ==
Obafemi was released by Watford prior to his 14th birthday in 2014. He took a year out of the game before joining Leyton Orient in 2015, moving on to Southampton in 2016.

=== Southampton ===
Obafemi made his professional debut for Southampton as a substitute in the 82nd minute of a 1–1 draw with Tottenham Hotspur on 21 January 2018. Aged 17 years and 199 days, Obafemi became the second youngest player to make a Premier League appearance for Southampton after Luke Shaw, who was 17 years and 116 days old.

He scored his first professional goal with the third goal in a 3–1 victory at Huddersfield on 22 December 2018; at 18 years and 169 days old, he became Southampton's youngest scorer in the Premier League.

=== Swansea City ===
On 31 August 2021, Obafemi joined Swansea City for a fee reported to be between £1.5 and £2 million, signing a three-year contract. On 23 October 2021, Obafemi scored his first goal for Swansea in their 2–1 defeat to Birmingham City.

On the summer deadline day for the 2022 transfer window, Swansea rejected a number of bids from Burnley for Obafemi with the striker subsequently being left out of the team with concerns from manager Russell Martin over the striker's attitude.

=== Burnley ===
On 29 January 2023, Obafemi joined Burnley on loan for the remainder of the season, with a clause to make the transfer permanent at the end of the season.

On 1 July 2023, the transfer was made permanent.

==== Millwall (loan) ====
On 24 January 2024, Obafemi signed for Millwall on loan until the end of the season.

==== Plymouth Argyle (loan) ====
On 22 August 2024, Obafemi signed for Plymouth Argyle on a season long loan.

==== VFL Bochum (loan) ====
On 1 September 2025, Obafemi signed for 2. Bundesliga club VFL Bochum on a season long loan, becoming the first Irish player to ever play for the club.

==== Blackpool (loan) ====
On 21 January 2026, Obafemi joined Blackpool on loan until the end of the season. He made just 5 appearances before suffering a 'high ankle tear' in February that required surgery, meaning he would miss the rest of the season through injury and recovery.

== International career ==
Obafemi was eligible to represent England, Nigeria, and the Republic of Ireland. In November 2018 he committed to the Republic of Ireland.

Obafemi represented the Republic of Ireland at under-19 level, debuting during the 2019 UEFA European Under-19 Championship qualification campaign.

On 6 November 2018, Obafemi was named in the senior Republic of Ireland squad for the first time for the friendly against Northern Ireland on 15 November and the UEFA Nations League match against Denmark on 19 November 2018. He came on as a substitute in the second half of the 0–0 draw against Denmark to make his debut. He also became the first player born in the 2000s to win a senior cap for Ireland. Obafemi made his debut for the Republic of Ireland under-21 team on 10 October 2019, coming off the bench, in a 0–0 draw with Italy under-21s at Tallaght Stadium.

On 11 June 2022, he made his first international start at senior level, in a UEFA Nations League match against Scotland, providing one assist (for Troy Parrott) and scoring his first goal, before a groin strain saw Obafemi substituted five minutes after scoring, being replaced by Scott Hogan. His start in the 22 March 2023 home friendly 3–2 win by the Republic over Latvia, saw Obafemi provide the assist for Evan Ferguson's first international goal.

== Career statistics ==
=== Club ===
As of match played 14 February 2026

Appearances and goals by club, season and competition
Club	Season	League			National Cup (Note: Includes FA Cup, DFB-Pokal)		League cup (Note: Includes EFL Cup)		Other		Total	
Club	Season	Division	Apps	Goals	Apps	Goals	Apps	Goals	Apps	Goals	Apps	Goals
Southampton U21/U23	2016–17	—			—		—		0	0	0	0
Southampton U21/U23	2017–18	—			—		—		2 (Note: Appearance(s) in EFL Trophy)	0	2	0
Southampton U21/U23	2018–19	—			—		—		1	1	1	1
Southampton U21/U23	Total		—		—		—		3	1	3	1
Southampton	2017–18	Premier League	1	0	0	0	0	0	—		1	0
Southampton	2018–19	Premier League	6	1	0	0	1	0	—		7	1
Southampton	2019–20	Premier League	21	3	2	0	2	1	—		25	4
Southampton	2020–21	Premier League	4	0	0	0	1	0	—		5	0
Southampton	2021–22	Premier League	0	0	—		1	0	—		1	0
Southampton	Total		32	4	2	0	5	1	—		39	5
Swansea City	2021–22	Championship	32	12	1	0	—		—		33	12
Swansea City	2022–23	Championship	19	3	—		0	0	—		19	3
Swansea City	Total		51	15	1	0	5	1	—		52	15
Burnley (loan)	2022–23	Championship	12	2	2	0	—		—		14	2
Burnley	2023–24	Premier League	2	0	0	0	0	0	—		2	0
Burnley	2024–25	Championship	0	0	—		—		—		0	0
Burnley	2025–26	Premier League	0	0	—		—		—		0	0
Burnley	2026–27	Championship	0	0	0	0	0	0	—		0	0
Burnley	Total		2	0	0	0	0	0	—		2	0
Millwall (loan)	2023–24	Championship	14	2	—		—		—		14	2
Plymouth Argyle (loan)	2024–25	Championship	29	2	1	0	1	0	—		31	2
Bochum (loan)	2025–26	2. Bundesliga	2	0	1	0	—		—		3	0
Blackpool (loan)	2025–26	League One	5	0	—		—		—		5	0
Career total			147	25	7	0	6	1	3	1	163	27

=== International ===
As of match played 4 June 2024

Appearances and goals by national team and year
National team	Year	Apps	Goals
Republic of Ireland	2018	1	0
Republic of Ireland	2022	6	2
Republic of Ireland	2023	4	0
Republic of Ireland	2024	1	0
Total		12	2

Scores and results list Republic of Ireland's goal tally first.

List of international goals scored by Michael Obafemi
No.	Date	Venue	Opponent	Score	Result	Competition
1	11 June 2022	Aviva Stadium, Dublin, Ireland	Scotland	3–0	3–0	2022–23 UEFA Nations League B
2	27 September 2022	Aviva Stadium, Dublin, Ireland	Armenia	2–0	3–2	2022–23 UEFA Nations League B

== Honours ==
Burnley

- EFL Championship: 2022–23
