= Victory Shield =

Association football tournament

- The Victory Shield trophy, in use since the Second World War as the first trophy was lost during the war, with the logo of former sponsor Sky Sports
- Sport: Football
- Founded: 1925
- No. of teams: 4
- Country: Republic of Ireland; Northern Ireland; Scotland; Wales
- Most recent champion: Republic of Ireland

The Victory Shield is an annual football tournament competed for by the under-16 teams of Scotland, Republic of Ireland, Northern Ireland and Wales. The Victory Shield had traditionally been competed for by the four Home Nations, but the Football Association withdrew the England team from the tournament "for the foreseeable future" in 2015. The competition was continued after England's withdrawal, with the Republic of Ireland taking their place. The competition was competed by under-15 teams until 2001, when switching to under-16 to fall in line with UEFA competitions.

== List of previous winners ==
=== Pre-War ===
Incomplete

- 1925 – Scotland

=== Post-War ===
==== 1940s ====
- 1946–47 Scotland
- 1947–48 Scotland
- 1948–49 Wales
- 1949–50 England

==== 1950s ====
- 1950–51 England, Scotland & Wales – joint champions
- 1951–52 England
- 1952–53 England
- 1953–54 England
- 1954–55 England
- 1955–56 Scotland
- 1956–57 England
- 1957–58 England
- 1958–59 Scotland
- 1959–60 England

==== 1960s ====
- 1960–61 Scotland
- 1961–62 Scotland
- 1962–63 England
- 1963–64 England
- 1964–65 England
- 1965–66 England
- 1966–67 England
- 1967–68 Scotland & England – joint champions
- 1968–69 Scotland
- 1969–70 Scotland

==== 1970s ====
- 1970–71 England
- 1971–72 Scotland
- 1972–73 England
- 1973–74 Scotland
- 1974–75 England
- 1975–76 England
- 1976–77 England
- 1977–78 England & Scotland – joint champions
- 1978–79 England
- 1979–80 England & Scotland – joint champions

==== 1980s ====
- 1980–81 England & Scotland – joint champions
- 1981–82 Scotland
- 1982–83 England & Scotland – joint champions
- 1983–84 England
- 1984–85 England
- 1985–86 England & Scotland – joint champions
- 1986–87 England
- 1987–88 Scotland
- 1988–89 Scotland
- 1989–90 England

==== 1990s ====
- 1990–91 England, Scotland & Wales – joint champions
- 1991–92 England
- 1992–93 Scotland
- 1993–94 England
- 1994–95 England
- 1995–96 England
- 1996–97 Scotland & England – joint champions
- 1997–98 Scotland
- 1998–99 Scotland
- 1999–2000 England

==== 2000s ====
- 2000–01 Northern Ireland
- 2001–02 England
- 2002–03 England
- 2003–04 Scotland & England – joint champions
- 2004–05 England
- 2005–06 England & Wales – joint champions
- 2006–07 England
- 2007–08 England
- 2008–09 England
- 2009–10 England

==== 2010s ====
- 2010 England
- 2011 England
- 2012 England
- 2013 Scotland
- 2014 Wales
- 2015 Wales
- 2016 Republic of Ireland
- 2017 Republic of Ireland
- 2018 Northern Ireland
- 2019 Scotland & Wales – joint champions

==== 2020s ====
- 2020 | Not Played
- 2021 Scotland & Wales – joint champions
- 2022 Republic of Ireland
- 2023 Republic of Ireland
- 2024 Republic of Ireland

== Overall winners since World War II ==
- England – 38 (outright winners)
- Scotland – 17 (outright winners)
- Republic of Ireland – 5 (outright winners)
- Wales – 3 (outright winners)
- Northern Ireland – 2 (outright winners)
- England and Scotland – 8 (shared)
- England, Scotland and Wales – 2 (shared)
- England and Wales – 2 (shared)
- Scotland and Wales – 2 (shared)
