= 2009 Victory Shield =

The Victory Shield 2009 is the 64th edition of the Victory Shield, an annual football tournament that began in 1925 and is competed for by the Under 16 level teams of England, Scotland, Northern Ireland and Wales. It was held from 1 October to 26 November 2009 and was won by England for the 9th time in a row.

== Venues ==
Country	Stadium	Capacity
England	Huish Park	9,665
England	Deva Stadium	5,328
Northern Ireland	Ballymena Showgrounds	5,200
Scotland	Tynecastle Stadium	17,420
Wales	Belle Vue	3,800
Wales	Victoria Road	6,000

== Final table ==
Teams	GP	W	D	L	GF	GA	GD	Pts
England	3	3	0	0	5	1	+4	9
Scotland	3	2	0	1	4	3	+1	6
Wales	3	1	0	2	2	2	0	3
Northern Ireland	3	0	0	3	1	6	-5	0

== Matches and Results ==
1 October 2009

Northern Ireland	1 – 2	Scotland
Paul George 15'	Report	Matthew Kennedy 44', 47'

Ballymena Showgrounds, Northern Ireland

15 October 2009

England	1 – 0	Wales
Zak Ansah 76'	Report

Huish Park, England

29 October 2009

Wales	0 – 1	Scotland
	Report	Islam Feruz 10'

Belle Vue, Wales

5 November 2009

England	2 – 0	Northern Ireland
Turgott 50'; Matthias Fanimo 80+2'	Report

Deva Stadium, Chester

19 November 2009

Wales	2 – 0	Northern Ireland

Victoria Park, Wales

26 November 2009

Scotland	1 – 2	England
Jack Grimmer 25'	Report	Zak Ansah 27'; Turgott 60'

Tynecastle Stadium, Scotland

== Result ==
2009 Victory Shield winners

England

== See also ==
- Victory Shield
