= List of Italian football transfers winter 2018–19 =

The 2018–19 winter transfer window for Italian football transfers opened on 3 January and closed on 31 January 2019. Additionally, players without a club could join at any time. This list includes transfers featuring at least one Serie A or Serie B club which were completed after the end of the summer 2018 transfer window and before the end of the 2018–19 winter window.

== Transfers ==
Legend

- Italic text indicates that the player already left the team on loan, on this or the previous season, or was a new signing that immediately left the club.

=== December ===
Date	Name	Moving from	Moving to	Fee
14 December 2018	Alessandro Berardi	Unattached	Verona	Free
24 December 2018	(Slovenia) Aljaž Struna	Palermo	(United States) Houston Dynamo	Undisclosed
24 December 2018	(Uruguay) Maximiliano Olivera	Fiorentina	(Paraguay) Olimpia	Loan
30 December 2018	(Brazil) Gilberto	Fiorentina	(Brazil) Fluminense	Loan

=== January ===
Date	Name	Moving from	Moving to	Fee
1 January 2019	(Colombia) Luis Muriel	(Spain) Sevilla	Fiorentina	Loan
3 January 2019	(Greece) Panagiotis Tachtsidis	(England) Nottingham Forest	Lecce	Loan
4 January 2019	Nicola Sansone	(Spain) Villarreal	Bologna	Loan
4 January 2019	Roberto Soriano	(Spain) Villarreal	Bologna	Loan
4 January 2019	Andrea Brighenti	Cremonese	Monza	Undisclosed
4 January 2019	Cosimo Chiricò	Lecce	Monza	Undisclosed
4 January 2019	Stefano Minelli	Brescia	Padova	Free
4 January 2019	(Brazil) Lucas Paquetá	(Brazil) Flamengo	Milan	Undisclosed
5 January 2019	Enrico Bearzotti	Verona	Monza	Loan
5 January 2019	Marco Fossati	Verona	Monza	Undisclosed
5 January 2019	Ivan Marconi	Cremonese	Monza	Undisclosed
7 January 2019	Filippo Scaglia	Cittadella	Monza	Undisclosed
7 January 2019	Emiliano Viviano	(Portugal) Sporting	S.P.A.L.	Loan
7 January 2019	(Brazil) Everton Luiz	S.P.A.L.	(United States) Real Salt Lake	Loan
8 January 2019	(Croatia) Anton Krešić	Atalanta	Carpi	Loan
8 January 2019	Giulio Bizzotto	Cittadella	Cartigliano	Free
8 January 2019	Danilo Soddimo	Frosinone	Cremonese	Undisclosed
8 January 2019	Ivan De Santis	Ascoli	Virtus Entella	Loan
8 January 2019	Luca Valzania	Atalanta	Frosinone	Loan
8 January 2019	(Nigeria) Jerry Mbakogu	Unattached	Padova	Free
8 January 2019	Giuseppe Borello	Crotone	Rende	Loan
8 January 2019	Michael D'Eramo	Avezzano	Spezia	Undisclosed
8 January 2019	Stefano Okaka	(England) Watford	Udinese	Loan
8 January 2019	Andrea Tiritiello	Cosenza	Virtus Francavilla	Loan
8 January 2019	(Bulgaria) Radoslav Tsonev	Lecce	Viterbese	Loan
9 January 2019	(Slovenia) Valter Birsa	Chievo	Cagliari	€2M
9 January 2019	(Sierra Leone) Augustus Kargbo	Roccella	Crotone	Undisclosed
9 January 2019	Aniello Viscovo	Crotone	Avellino	Free
9 January 2019	(Slovenia) Siniša Anđelković	Venezia	Padova	Undisclosed
9 January 2019	Nicolò Cherubin	Verona	Padova	Undisclosed
9 January 2019	(Nigeria) Umar Sadiq	Roma	Perugia	Loan
9 January 2019	Luca Verna	Cosenza	Pisa	End of loan
9 January 2019	Salvatore Esposito	S.P.A.L.	Ravenna	Loan
9 January 2019	Giuseppe Scalera	Pescara	Sambenedettese	Loan
9 January 2019	Andrea Cisco	Sassuolo	Albissola	Loan
9 January 2019	Francesco Fedato	Foggia	Trapani	Loan
9 January 2019	(Senegal) Demba Thiam	S.P.A.L.	Viterbese	Loan
10 January 2019	Daniele Dessena	Cagliari	Brescia	€600,000
10 January 2019	Alessandro Tripaldelli	Sassuolo	Crotone	Loan
10 January 2019	Samuele Parlati	Ascoli	Bisceglie	Loan
10 January 2019	Alessandro Turrin	Atalanta	Imolese	Loan
10 January 2019	Pasquale Maiorino	Livorno	FeralpiSalò	Loan
10 January 2019	Marcello Falzerano	Venezia	Perugia	€300,000
10 January 2019	Andrea Morelli	Lecce	Unione Sanremo	Loan
10 January 2019	Davide Cavaliere	Lecce	Virtus Francavilla	Loan
10 January 2019	(Netherlands) Marvin Zeegelaar	(England) Watford	Udinese	Loan
11 January 2019	(Brazil) Gabriel Barbosa	Inter	(Brazil) Flamengo	Loan
11 January 2019	Marco Curto	Reggina	Empoli	End of loan
11 January 2019	Gianluca Frabotta	Bologna	Pordenone	Loan
11 January 2019	Matteo Rover	Inter	Pordenone	Loan
11 January 2019	Manolo Gabbiadini	(England) Southampton	Sampdoria	€12M
11 January 2019	(Netherlands) Alessio Da Cruz	Parma	Spezia	Loan
11 January 2019	Daniele Giorico	Carpi	Virtus Verona	2-years-loan
12 January 2019	Giuseppe Carriero	Parma	Catania	Loan
12 January 2019	(Brazil) Felipe Vizeu	Udinese	(Brazil) Grêmio	Loan
12 January 2019	Simone Calvano	Verona	Padova	Loan
12 January 2019	Tommaso Fantacci	Empoli	Pistoiese	Loan
13 January 2019	(Ecuador) Bryan Cabezas	Atalanta	(Ecuador) Emelec	Loan
14 January 2019	Andrea Palazzi	Inter	Monza	Loan
14 January 2019	Mattia Minesso	Padova	Pisa	Undisclosed
14 January 2019	Davide Bettella	Atalanta	Pescara	2-years-loan
14 January 2019	Matteo Bachini	Spezia	Piacenza	Loan
14 January 2019	(Argentina) Franco Ferrari	Genoa	Piacenza	Loan
14 January 2019	Giovanni Terrani	Perugia	Piacenza	Free
14 January 2019	(Argentina) Facundo Lescano	Parma	Potenza	Loan
14 January 2019	Davide Faraoni	Crotone	Verona	Loan
15 January 2019	(Argentina) Emiliano Rigoni	Atalanta	(Russia) Zenit	End of loan
15 January 2019	(Poland) Sebastian Walukiewicz	(Poland) Pogoń Szczecin	Cagliari	€4M
15 January 2019	(Poland) Sebastian Walukiewicz	Cagliari	(Poland) Pogoń Szczecin	Loan
15 January 2019	Mattia Vitale	S.P.A.L.	Carpi	Loan
15 January 2019	Davide Diaw	Virtus Entella	Cittadella	Undisclosed
15 January 2019	(Brazil) Victor da Silva	Chievo	Fano	Loan
15 January 2019	Sergio Contessa	Padova	FeralpiSalò	Undisclosed
15 January 2019	(Ivory Coast) Hamed Junior Traorè	Empoli	Fiorentina	€13M
15 January 2019	(Ivory Coast) Hamed Junior Traorè	Fiorentina	Empoli	Loan
15 January 2019	(Croatia) Ante Budimir	Crotone	(Spain) Mallorca	Loan
15 January 2019	Gaetano Infusino	Crotone	Nardò	Loan
15 January 2019	(Romania) Adrian Stoian	Crotone	(Romania) FCSB	Free
15 January 2019	Armando Anastasio	Napoli	Monza	Loan
15 January 2019	Lorenzo Lollo	Empoli	Padova	Loan
15 January 2019	Alessandro Longhi	Brescia	Padova	Undisclosed
15 January 2019	(Switzerland) Michel Morganella	(Switzerland) Rapperswil-Jona	Padova	Undisclosed
15 January 2019	(Slovakia) Juraj Kucka	(Turkey) Trabzonspor	Parma	Undisclosed
15 January 2019	Alessandro Piu	Empoli	Pistoiese	Loan
15 January 2019	Nicola Bellomo	Salernitana	Reggina	Undisclosed
15 January 2019	(France) Abdou Doumbia	Lecce	Reggina	Undisclosed
15 January 2019	Cristiano Lombardi	Lazio	Venezia	Loan
15 January 2019	Daniele Mignanelli	Ascoli	Viterbese	Undisclosed
16 January 2019	Davide Marsura	Venezia	Carpi	Undisclosed
16 January 2019	Antonio Caracciolo	Verona	Cremonese	Loan
16 January 2019	Matteo Chinellato	Padova	Gubbio	Loan
16 January 2019	Erasmo Mulè	Trapani	Sampdoria	Undisclosed
16 January 2019	Erasmo Mulè	Sampdoria	Trapani	Loan
16 January 2019	Simone Scuffet	Udinese	(Turkey) Kasımpaşa	Loan
16 January 2019	Alessandro Rossi	Lazio	Venezia	Loan
16 January 2019	(Latvia) Kristaps Zommers	Parma	Unattached	Released
17 January 2019	Samuele Perisan	Padova	Udinese	End of loan
17 January 2019	(Cameroon) Joseph Minala	Lazio	Salernitana	Loan
17 January 2019	(Czech Republic) Tomáš Čvančara	(Czech Republic) Jablonec	Empoli	Loan
17 January 2019	(Switzerland) Johan Djourou	S.P.A.L.	Unattached	Released
17 January 2019	Jacopo Murano	S.P.A.L.	Unattached	Released
17 January 2019	(Czech Republic) Libor Kozák	Livorno	Unattached	Released
17 January 2019	Tino Parisi	Livorno	Siracusa	Loan
17 January 2019	(Argentina) Nicolás Spolli	Genoa	Crotone	Loan
17 January 2019	Ivan Varone	Cosenza	Carrarese	Loan
17 January 2019	Giuseppe Torromino	Lecce	Juve Stabia	Undisclosed
17 January 2019	Lorenzo Crisanto	Roma	Monopoli	Loan
17 January 2019	Luigi D'Ignazio	Napoli	Sambenedettese	Loan
17 January 2019	Thomas Saloni	Spezia	Virtus Francavilla	Loan
17 January 2019	Marco Guidone	Padova	Vis Pesaro	Loan
18 January 2019	Felice D'Amico	Inter	Chievo	Loan
18 January 2019	Riccardo Mastrilli	S.P.A.L.	Bisceglie	Loan
18 January 2019	Matteo Di Piazza	Cosenza	Catania	Undisclosed
18 January 2019	Andrea Bianchimano	Perugia	Catanzaro	Loan
18 January 2019	Ivan Rondanini	Brescia	Cremonese	Undisclosed
18 January 2019	Leandro Greco	Cremonese	Foggia	Undisclosed
18 January 2019	Matteo Perri	Ascoli	Paganese	Loan
18 January 2019	Iacopo Cernigoi	Pisa	Salernitana	Undisclosed
18 January 2019	Iacopo Cernigoi	Salernitana	Rieti	Loan
18 January 2019	Vincenzo Garofalo	Pro Piacenza	Salernitana	Free
18 January 2019	Vincenzo Garofalo	Salernitana	Rieti	Loan
18 January 2019	Massimo Goh N'Cede	Juventus	Virtus Verona	Free
19 January 2019	Sebastiano Longo	Parma	Potenza	Loan
21 January 2019	Giuseppe Pezzella	Udinese	Genoa	Loan
21 January 2019	(Ghana) Kevin-Prince Boateng	Sassuolo	(Spain) Barcelona	Loan
21 January 2019	(Belgium) Stephane Omeonga	Genoa	(Scotland) Hibernian	Loan
21 January 2019	Gabriele Rolando	Sampdoria	Carpi	Loan
21 January 2019	Andrea Cassaghi	Sampdoria	Monza	Undisclosed
21 January 2019	Marco Armellino	Lecce	Monza	€500,000
21 January 2019	(Croatia) Tomislav Gomelt	(Romania) Dinamo București	Crotone	Undisclosed
21 January 2019	Alessandro Vogliacco	Juventus	Pordenone	Loan
21 January 2019	(Austria) Arnel Jakupović	Empoli	(Austria) Sturm Graz	Loan
22 January 2019	(Belgium) Moutir Chajia	(Portugal) Estoril	Ascoli	Loan
22 January 2019	(Poland) Tomasz Kupisz	Ascoli	Livorno	Loan
22 January 2019	Alessandro Deiola	Parma	Cagliari	End of loan
22 January 2019	(Senegal) Mamadou Coulibaly	Udinese	Carpi	Loan
22 January 2019	Luca Strizzolo	Cittadella	Cremonese	Undisclosed
22 January 2019	(Poland) Bartłomiej Drągowski	Fiorentina	Empoli	Loan
22 January 2019	Pietro Terracciano	Empoli	Fiorentina	Loan
22 January 2019	Massimiliano Mangraviti	Brescia	Gozzano	Loan
22 January 2019	Luca Scarlino	Spezia	Sampdoria	Loan
22 January 2019	Gianluca Scamacca	(Netherlands) PEC Zwolle	Sassuolo	End of loan
22 January 2019	(Algeria) Mouhamed Belkheir	Brescia	Torino	Free
22 January 2019	(Iceland) Emil Hallfreðsson	Frosinone	Unattached	Released
22 January 2019	Michele Fornasier	Pescara	Venezia	Loan
23 January 2019	(Argentina) Gonzalo Higuaín	Juventus	(England) Chelsea	Loan
23 January 2019	(Poland) Krzysztof Piątek	Genoa	Milan	€35M
23 January 2019	(Brazil) Dodô	Sampdoria	(Brazil) Cruzeiro	Loan
23 January 2019	Gabriele Moncini	S.P.A.L.	Cittadella	Loan
23 January 2019	Giovanni Crociata	Crotone	Carpi	Loan
23 January 2019	(France) Zinédine Machach	Napoli	Crotone	Loan
23 January 2019	Umberto Otranto	Napoli	Fermana	Loan
23 January 2019	Alessandro Bruno	Livorno	Pescara	Free
23 January 2019	Andrea Romagnoli	Roma	Pistoiese	Loan
23 January 2019	(France) Alain Baclet	Cosenza	Reggina	Undisclosed
23 January 2019	Antonio Di Gaudio	Parma	Verona	Loan
24 January 2019	(Ivory Coast) Emmanuel Latte Lath	Atalanta	Carrarese	Loan
24 January 2019	Lorenzo Crisetig	Bologna	Benevento	Loan
24 January 2019	(Croatia) Andrija Balić	Udinese	(Netherlands) Fortuna Sittard	Loan
24 January 2019	(Czech Republic) Stefan Simić	Milan	Frosinone	Loan
24 January 2019	Federico Viviani	S.P.A.L.	Frosinone	Loan
24 January 2019	Stefano Sturaro	Juventus	Genoa	Loan, €1,5M
24 January 2019	Pier Francesco Bertoli	Pordenone	Napoli	Loan
24 January 2019	Marco Carraro	Atalanta	Perugia	Loan
24 January 2019	Stefano Tarolli	Foggia	Renate	Loan
24 January 2019	Tommaso Brignoli	Inter	Rende	Loan
24 January 2019	Ivan Pedrelli	Livorno	Siena	Undisclosed
25 January 2019	(Uruguay) Christian Oliva	(Uruguay) Nacional	Cagliari	Loan
25 January 2019	Marcello Trotta	Sassuolo	Frosinone	Undisclosed
25 January 2019	(Ghana) Emmanuel Besea	Frosinone	Venezia	Loan
25 January 2019	(France) Sebastien De Maio	Bologna	Udinese	Loan
25 January 2019	Simone Zanon	South Tyrol	Napoli	Loan
25 January 2019	(Senegal) Abdou Diakhate	Fiorentina	Parma	Undisclosed
25 January 2019	Amato Ciciretti	Napoli	Ascoli	Loan
25 January 2019	Michele Nardi	Parma	South Tyrol	Loan
25 January 2019	(Ivory Coast) Pierre Zebli	Ascoli	(Belgium) Genk	End of loan
25 January 2019	(Switzerland) Dennis Iapichino	Livorno	(Switzerland) Servette	Loan
25 January 2019	Michele Cerofolini	Fiorentina	Bisceglie	Loan
25 January 2019	Luca Mosti	Fiorentina	Bisceglie	Loan
25 January 2019	Vincenzo Sarno	Padova	Catania	Undisclosed
25 January 2019	(Guinea-Bissau) Carlos Embaló	Palermo	Cosenza	Loan
25 January 2019	(Albania) Hysen Memolla	(Croatia) Hajduk Split	Salernitana	Undisclosed
25 January 2019	Antonio Di Nardo	Sampdoria	Lucchese	Loan
25 January 2019	Antonio Palumbo	Sampdoria	Ternana	Loan
25 January 2019	Lorenzo Migliorelli	Atalanta	Virtus Entella	Loan
26 January 2019	Andrea Fulignati	Empoli	Ascoli	Undisclosed
26 January 2019	Filippo Perucchini	Ascoli	Empoli	Undisclosed
26 January 2019	(Brazil) Jandrei	(Brazil) Chapecoense	Genoa	€2,4M
26 January 2019	(Portugal) Cédric Soares	(England) Southampton	Inter	Loan, €500,000
26 January 2019	(Croatia) Stipe Perica	Udinese	(Turkey) Kasımpaşa	Loan
26 January 2019	Daniele Sciaudone	Novara	Cosenza	Loan
26 January 2019	Alessandro Quaini	Genoa	Renate	Loan
27 January 2019	Edoardo Masciangelo	(Switzerland) Lugano	Juventus U23	Loan
27 January 2019	(Ukraine) Nikita Vlasenko	(Switzerland) Lugano	Juventus	Loan
27 January 2019	(Switzerland) Cendrim Kameraj	Juventus	(Switzerland) Lugano	Undisclosed
27 January 2019	(Czech Republic) Roman Macek	Juventus	(Switzerland) Lugano	Undisclosed
28 January 2019	Ezequiel Schelotto	(England) Brighton	Chievo	Loan
28 January 2019	(Morocco) Medhi Benatia	Juventus	(Qatar) Al-Duhail	€8M
28 January 2019	(Poland) Szymon Żurkowski	(Poland) Górnik Zabrze	Fiorentina	€3,7M
28 January 2019	(Poland) Szymon Żurkowski	Fiorentina	(Poland) Górnik Zabrze	Loan
28 January 2019	(Paraguay) Antonio Sanabria	(Spain) Real Betis	Genoa	2-years-loan
28 January 2019	(Greece) Dimitris Nikolaou	(Greece) Olympiacos	Empoli	Loan
28 January 2019	Stefano Pettinari	Lecce	Crotone	Loan
28 January 2019	Marco Tumminello	Atalanta	Lecce	Loan
28 January 2019	(Slovakia) Róbert Mazáň	(Spain) Celta Vigo	Venezia	Loan
29 January 2019	(Guadeloupe) Andreaw Gravillon	Pescara	Inter	Undisclosed
29 January 2019	(Guadeloupe) Andreaw Gravillon	Inter	Pescara	Loan
29 January 2019	Gabriele Zappa	Inter	Pescara	Undisclosed
29 January 2019	Gabriele Zappa	Pescara	Inter	Loan
29 January 2019	(Brazil) Roger Ibañez	(Brazil) Fluminense	Atalanta	€4M
29 January 2019	(Venezuela) Darwin Machís	Udinese	(Spain) Cádiz	Loan
29 January 2019	(Senegal) Assane Dioussé	(France) Saint-Étienne	Chievo	Loan
29 January 2019	(Croatia) Toni Fruk	(Belgium) Mouscron	Fiorentina	Undisclosed
29 January 2019	(Denmark) Lukas Lerager	(France) Bordeaux	Genoa	Loan
29 January 2019	(Uruguay) Martín Cáceres	Lazio	Juventus	Loan, €600,000
29 January 2019	(Croatia) Marko Rog	Napoli	(Spain) Sevilla	Loan
29 January 2019	(Switzerland) Joel Untersee	Empoli	(Switzerland) Zürich	Loan
29 January 2019	Luca Bittante	Empoli	Cosenza	Undisclosed
29 January 2019	(Bulgaria) Andrea Hristov	(Bulgaria) Slavia Sofia	Cosenza	Loan
29 January 2019	Nicola Leali	Perugia	Foggia	Loan
29 January 2019	(Slovenia) Matija Boben	(Russia) Rostov	Livorno	Loan
29 January 2019	(Switzerland) Logan Clement	S.P.A.L.	Montevarchi	Loan
29 January 2019	Jacopo Finessi	Milan	Padova	Undisclosed
29 January 2019	Edoardo Rezzi	Lazio	Vibonese	Undisclosed
29 January 2019	(Venezuela) Franco Signorelli	Salernitana	(Romania) Voluntari	Loan
30 January 2019	Emil Audero	Juventus	Sampdoria	Loan
30 January 2019	Samuele Longo	Inter	Cremonese	Loan
30 January 2019	(Belgium) Benjamin Mokulu	Carpi	Juventus U23	Loan
30 January 2019	(Bulgaria) Kiril Despodov	(Bulgaria) CSKA Sofia	Cagliari	€4.2M
30 January 2019	(Colombia) Jherson Vergara	Olbia	Cagliari	Loan return
30 January 2019	(Slovakia) Samuel Mráz	Empoli	Crotone	Loan
30 January 2019	Alessandro Murgia	Lazio	S.P.A.L.	Loan
30 January 2019	(Portugal) Tiago Djaló	(Portugal) Sporting CP B	Milan	Undisclosed
30 January 2019	(Brazil) Carlos Vinícius	Napoli	Monaco	Loan
30 January 2019	(Turkey) Merih Demiral	(Turkey) Alanyaspor	Sassuolo	Loan
30 January 2019	Luca Caldirola	(Germany) Werder Bremen	Benevento	Undisclosed
30 January 2019	Pierluigi Cappelluzzo	Verona	Imolese	Loan
30 January 2019	(Slovakia) Šimon Štefanec	Verona	Nitra	Loan
30 January 2019	(Portugal) Daniel Liberal	Chievo	Fermana	Undisclosed
30 January 2019	Michele Rigione	Chievo	Novara	Loan
30 January 2019	(Costa Rica) Joel Campbell	Frosinone	(Mexico) Club León	Loan
30 January 2019	Matteo Gifford	Pescara	Paganese	Loan
30 January 2019	Francesco Corsinelli	Genoa	Piacenza	Undisclosed
30 January 2019	(Argentina) Claudio Spinelli	Genoa	Argentinos Juniors	Loan
30 January 2019	Alessandro Minelli	Rende	Parma	Undisclosed
30 January 2019	Alessandro Minelli	Parma	Rende	Loan
30 January 2019	Gianluca Carpani	Ascoli	Rieti	Loan
30 January 2019	Nicolas Giani	Spezia	FeralpiSalò	Undisclosed
30 January 2019	(Lithuania) Edgaras Dubickas	Lecce	Sicula Leonzio	Loan
30 January 2019	(Lithuania) Linas Mėgelaitis	Lecce	Sicula Leonzio	Loan
30 January 2019	Emanuele Spinozzi	Roma	Teramo	Loan
30 January 2019	Biagio Filogamo	Benevento	Vibonese	Loan
30 January 2019	Andrea Vassallo	Bologna	Renate	Loan
30 January 2019	Simone Pontisso	Udinese	Vicenza	Undisclosed
31 January 2019	(Croatia) Karlo Butić	Torino	Arezzo	Loan
31 January 2019	(Serbia) Vanja Milinković-Savić	Torino	Ascoli	Loan
31 January 2019	Cristian Andreoni	Vicenza	Ascoli	Undisclosed
31 January 2019	(Argentina) Gaspar Iñíguez	Udinese	Ascoli	Loan
31 January 2019	Matteo Rubin	Foggia	Ascoli	Loan
31 January 2019	(Ivory Coast) Willy Braciano	(Ivory Coast) ASEC Mimosas	Atalanta	Undisclosed
31 January 2019	(Democratic Republic of the Congo) Luzayadio Bangu	Fiorentina	Bisceglie	Loan
31 January 2019	Domenico Cuomo	Sampdoria	Bisceglie	Loan
31 January 2019	Simone Edera	Torino	Bologna	Loan
31 January 2019	(Brazil) Lyanco	Torino	Bologna	Loan
31 January 2019	Bruno Martella	Crotone	Brescia	Loan
31 January 2019	(Spain) Alejandro Rodríguez	Chievo	Brescia	Loan
31 January 2019	Fabrizio Cacciatore	Chievo	Cagliari	Loan
31 January 2019	(France) Maxime Leverbe	Sampdoria	Cagliari	Loan
31 January 2019	Luca Pellegrini	Roma	Cagliari	Loan
31 January 2019	(France) Cyril Théréau	Fiorentina	Cagliari	Loan
31 January 2019	(Nigeria) Joel Obi	Chievo	(Turkey) Alanyaspor	Loan
31 January 2019	(The Gambia) Ali Sowe	Chievo	(Bulgaria) CSKA Sofia	Undisclosed
31 January 2019	(Guinea) Karamoko Cissé	Verona	Carpi	Loan
31 January 2019	(Poland) Michał Marcjanik	Empoli	Carpi	Loan
31 January 2019	Mattia Mustacchio	Perugia	Carpi	Loan
31 January 2019	Luca Rizzo	Bologna	Carpi	Loan
31 January 2019	Michael Venturi	Carpi	Gozzano	Loan
31 January 2019	Lorenzo Filippini	Lazio	Cavese	Loan
31 January 2019	Mario Pugliese	Atalanta	Cavese	Loan
31 January 2019	Manuel Pascali	Cosenza	Casertana	Undisclosed
31 January 2019	Lorenzo Valeau	Roma	Catania	Loan
31 January 2019	Marco Andreolli	Cagliari	Chievo	Undisclosed
31 January 2019	(Brazil) Lucas Piazon	(England) Chelsea	Chievo	Loan
31 January 2019	Luca Parodi	FeralpiSalò	Cittadella	Undisclosed
31 January 2019	Gianluca Litteri	Venezia	Cosenza	Undisclosed
31 January 2019	(Senegal) Maodo Malick Mbaye	Chievo	Cremonese	Loan
31 January 2019	(Croatia) Hrvoje Milić	Unattached	Crotone	Free
31 January 2019	(Venezuela) Aristóteles Romero	Crotone	(Spain) Rayo Majadahonda	Loan
31 January 2019	(France) Jean Lambert Evan's	Gozzano	Crotone	Undisclosed
31 January 2019	(France) Jean Lambert Evan's	Crotone	Gozzano	Loan
31 January 2019	(Brazil) Junior Messias	Gozzano	Crotone	Undisclosed
31 January 2019	(Brazil) Junior Messias	Crotone	Gozzano	Loan
31 January 2019	(France) Jeremy Petris	Gozzano	Crotone	Undisclosed
31 January 2019	(France) Jeremy Petris	Crotone	Gozzano	Loan
31 January 2019	Cristian Dell'Orco	Sassuolo	Empoli	Loan
31 January 2019	(Netherlands) Kevin Diks	Fiorentina	Empoli	Loan
31 January 2019	(Brazil) Diego Farias	Cagliari	Empoli	Loan
31 January 2019	(Croatia) Marko Pajač	Cagliari	Empoli	Loan
31 January 2019	(Switzerland) Dimitri Oberlin	(Switzerland) Basel	Empoli	Loan
31 January 2019	(Denmark) Jacob Rasmussen	Empoli	Fiorentina	€7M
31 January 2019	(Denmark) Jacob Rasmussen	Fiorentina	Empoli	Loan
31 January 2019	(Turkey) Salih Uçan	(Turkey) Fenerbahçe	Empoli	Undisclosed
31 January 2019	(Slovenia) Miha Zajc	Empoli	(Turkey) Fenerbahçe	€6,5M
31 January 2019	Giancarlo Malcore	Cittadella	Fermana	Loan
31 January 2019	(Albania) Leonardo Maloku	Pescara	Fermana	Loan
31 January 2019	(Netherlands) Dennis van der Heijden	Carpi	Fermana	Loan
31 January 2019	(France) Jean-Claude Billong	Benevento	Foggia	Loan
31 January 2019	Gianmarco Ingrosso	Pisa	Foggia	Loan
31 January 2019	Andrea Marcucci	Roma	Foggia	Undisclosed
31 January 2019	Luca Matarese	Frosinone	Foggia	Loan
31 January 2019	(Belgium) Pierre-Yves Ngawa	Perugia	Foggia	Loan
31 January 2019	(Poland) Filip Jagiełło	(Poland) Zagłębie Lubin	Genoa	Undisclosed
31 January 2019	(Hungary) András Schäfer	(Hungary) MTK Budapest	Genoa	Undisclosed
31 January 2019	(Serbia) Ivan Radovanović	Chievo	Genoa	€4M
31 January 2019	Mattia Zennaro	Venezia	Genoa	Undisclosed
31 January 2019	Mattia Zennaro	Genoa	Venezia	Loan
31 January 2019	Lorenzo Adorni	Parma	Gubbio	Loan
31 January 2019	Roberto Ranieri	Atalanta	Imolese	Loan
31 January 2019	Aaron Tabacchi	Bologna	Imolese	Loan
31 January 2019	(Argentina) Tiago Casasola	Salernitana	Lazio	Undisclosed
31 January 2019	(Argentina) Tiago Casasola	Lazio	Salernitana	Loan
31 January 2019	Rômulo	Genoa	Lazio	Loan
31 January 2019	Andrea Saraniti	Viterbese	Lecce	End of loan
31 January 2019	Luca Crosta	Olbia	Livorno	Loan
31 January 2019	Gabriele Gori	Fiorentina	Livorno	Loan
31 January 2019	Fabio Eguelfi	Atalanta	Livorno	Loan
31 January 2019	Aniello Salzano	Ternana	Livorno	Loan
31 January 2019	Raoul Bellanova	Milan	(France) Bordeaux	Undisclosed
31 January 2019	Raoul Bellanova	(France) Bordeaux	Milan	Loan
31 January 2019	(Croatia) Alen Halilović	Milan	(Belgium) Standard Liège	Loan
31 January 2019	Franco Lepore	Lecce	Monza	Undisclosed
31 January 2019	(France) Valentin Eysseric	Fiorentina	(France) Nantes	Loan
31 January 2019	Simone Bastoni	Spezia	Novara	Loan
31 January 2019	Giampietro Perrulli	Cremonese	Novara	Undisclosed
31 January 2019	Claudio Zappa	Juventus	Novara	Loan
31 January 2019	Gabriele Dalla Bernardina	Cittadella	Olbia	Loan
31 January 2019	Filippo Gemmi	Livorno	Olbia	Loan
31 January 2019	Thomas Romboli	Livorno	Olbia	Loan
31 January 2019	(Brazil) Brazão	(Brazil) Cruzeiro	Parma	€2,5M
31 January 2019	(Equatorial Guinea) José Machín	Pescara	Parma	Loan
31 January 2019	(Uruguay) Nicolás Schiappacasse	(Spain) Atlético Madrid B	Parma	Loan
31 January 2019	Mattia Sprocati	Lazio	Parma	Loan
31 January 2019	(Senegal) Yves Baraye	Parma	Padova	Loan
31 January 2019	(Slovenia) Maks Barišič	Catania	Padova	Loan
31 January 2019	Matteo Scevola	Padova	(Slovenia) Tabor Sežana	Loan
31 January 2019	Francesco Della Rocca	Padova	Unattached	Released
31 January 2019	(Argentina) Albano Bizzarri	Foggia	Perugia	Loan
31 January 2019	Filippo Ranocchia	Perugia	Juventus	Undisclosed
31 January 2019	Filippo Ranocchia	Juventus	Perugia	2-years-loan
31 January 2019	Luigi Scaglia	Parma	Carrarese	Loan
31 January 2019	(Uruguay) Santiago Bellini	(Uruguay) Wanderers	Pescara	Loan
31 January 2019	Giovanni Pinto	Parma	Pescara	Loan
31 January 2019	Riccardo Sottil	Fiorentina	Pescara	Loan
31 January 2019	Leonardo Pérez	Cosenza	Piacenza	Loan
31 January 2019	(Serbia) Nikola Pejović	Empoli	Pistoiese	Loan
31 January 2019	Simone Emmanuello	Juventus	Pro Vercelli	Undisclosed
31 January 2019	Erik Gerbi	Pro Vercelli	Juventus	Undisclosed
31 January 2019	Erik Gerbi	Juventus	Pro Vercelli	Loan
31 January 2019	(Iceland) Sveinn Aron Guðjohnsen	Spezia	Ravenna	Loan
31 January 2019	Matteo Procopio	Torino	Reggina	Loan
31 January 2019	Sedrick Kalombo	Salernitana	Rimini	Loan
31 January 2019	Emanuele Calaiò	Parma	Salernitana	Undisclosed
31 January 2019	(The Gambia) Lamin Jallow	Chievo	Salernitana	Undisclosed
31 January 2019	(Uruguay) Walter López	Ternana	Salernitana	Undisclosed
31 January 2019	Marco Sau	Cagliari	Sampdoria	Undisclosed
31 January 2019	(Poland) Dawid Kownacki	Sampdoria	(Germany) Fortuna Düsseldorf	Loan
31 January 2019	Alessandro Milesi	Brescia	Sicula Leonzio	Loan
31 January 2019	Luca Miracoli	Brescia	Sicula Leonzio	Loan
31 January 2019	Federico Chiossi	Atalanta	Siena	Loan
31 January 2019	Alessandro Mattioli	Inter	South Tyrol	Loan
31 January 2019	Andrea Romanò	Inter	South Tyrol	Loan
31 January 2019	Andrea Fulignati	Ascoli	S.P.A.L.	Loan
31 January 2019	(Montenegro) Marko Janković	(Serbia) Partizan	S.P.A.L.	€1,8M
31 January 2019	Marco Meneghetti	Pordenone	S.P.A.L.	Undisclosed
31 January 2019	Marco Meneghetti	S.P.A.L.	Pordenone	Loan
31 January 2019	Vasco Regini	Sampdoria	S.P.A.L.	Loan
31 January 2019	Matteo Brero	Monza	Spezia	End of loan
31 January 2019	Alessandro Ligi	Carpi	Spezia	Loan
31 January 2019	Luca Castiglia	Salernitana	Ternana	Loan
31 January 2019	Paolo Frascatore	Carpi	Triestina	Undisclosed
31 January 2019	(Brazil) Sandro	Genoa	Udinese	Loan
31 January 2019	(Mali) Molla Wagué	Udinese	(England) Nottingham Forest	Loan
31 January 2019	(England) Ben Wilmot	(England) Watford	Udinese	Loan
31 January 2019	(Brazil) Bruno Bertinato	(Brazil) Coritiba	Venezia	Undisclosed
31 January 2019	Riccardo Bocalon	Salernitana	Venezia	Undisclosed
31 January 2019	Gianni Munari	Parma	Verona	Loan
31 January 2019	Gaetano Navas	Reggina	Verona	Undisclosed
31 January 2019	Gaetano Navas	Verona	Paganese	Loan
31 January 2019	Luigi Vitale	Salernitana	Verona	Undisclosed
31 January 2019	Andrea Zaccagno	Torino	Vibonese	Loan
31 January 2019	Simone Salviato	Padova	Vicenza	Undisclosed
31 January 2019	Luca Sparandeo	Benevento	Viterbese	Loan

=== February ===
Date	Name	Moving from	Moving to	Fee
1 February 2019	(Netherlands) Rai Vloet	Frosinone	Unattached	Released
5 February 2019	Mohamed Said Adan	Empoli	(Belarus) Dynamo Brest	Loan
5 February 2019	Nicolao Dumitru	(Spain) Tarragona	Livorno	Free
5 February 2019	Aleandro Rosi	Unattached	Perugia	Free
6 February 2019	Stefano Sturaro	Juventus	Genoa	€16,5M
12 February 2019	(Nigeria) Orji Okwonkwo	Bologna	(Canada) Montreal Impact	Loan
13 February 2019	(Slovenia) Dejan Vokić	Unattached	Benevento	Free
14 February 2019	(Slovakia) Marek Hamšík	Napoli	(China) Dalian	€15M
14 February 2019	(England) Ravel Morrison	Lazio	(Sweden) Östersunds	Undisclosed
19 February 2019	Alberto Cerri	Juventus	Cagliari	€9M
20 February 2019	(Slovenia) Žan Majer	Unattached	Lecce	Free
22 February 2019	(Argentina) Mariano Izco	Unattached	Cosenza	Free
26 February 2019	Emil Audero	Juventus	Sampdoria	€20M
27 February 2019	Andrea Cocco	Unattached	Padova	Free
1 March 2019	(Norway) Niklas Gunnarsson	Unattached	Palermo	Free
21 March 2019	(Bosnia and Herzegovina) Daniel Pavlović	Unattached	Perugia	Free
3 April 2019	Paolo Baiocco	Unattached	Livorno	Free
11 April 2019	(Costa Rica) Giancarlo González	Bologna	(United States) LA Galaxy	Undisclosed
