= Chiosso =

Chiosso (pronounced [ˈkjɔsso]) is an Italian surname from Turin. Notable people with the surname include:

- James Chiosso (c. 1789 – 1864), Italian-English inventor
- Leo Chiosso (1920–2006), Italian lyricist

== See also ==
- Chiossi
- Chiossone
