= Chiossone =

Chiossone (pronounced [kjosˈsoːne]) is an Italian surname from Genoa. Notable people with the surname include:

- Edoardo Chiossone (1833–1898), Italian engraver and painter
- Tulio Chiossone (1905–2001), Venezuelan historian, jurist, humanist and politician

== See also ==
- Chiosso
- Chiossi
