= Gianluca Clemente =

Italian footballer

Personal information
- Date of birth: 15 April 1996 (age 30)
- Place of birth: Fano, Italy
- Height: 1.82 m (6 ft 0 in)
- Position: Right-back

Team information
- Current team: Cosenza

Youth career
- 2012–2013: Fano

Senior career*
Years	Team	Apps	(Gls)
2013–2015	Fano	49	(0)
2015–2016	Pescara	0	(0)
2015–2016	→ Macaratese (loan)	5	(0)
2016	Grosseto	6	(1)
2016–2019	Fermana	68	(0)
2019	Fano	9	(0)
2019–2020	Carpi	4	(0)
2020	Fermana	8	(0)
2020–2026	Pro Vercelli	113	(1)
2023–2024	→ Ancona (loan)	29	(1)
2026–	Cosenza	0	(0)
- * Club domestic league appearances and goals as of 30 April 2026

Gianluca Clemente (born 15 April 1996) is an Italian professional footballer who plays as a right-back for Serie C Group C club Cosenza.

== Club career ==
Coming through the youth sector, Clemente began his career with local club Fano in Serie D. Following a move to Pescara, who promptly loaned him to Macaratese, Clemente joined Grosseto in 2016. In November 2016, Grosseto finalized the sale of Clemente to Fermana.

Clemente moved back to Fano in the last day of the 2019 January transfer window. On 2 September 2019, he joined Carpi on a two-year deal. Clemente returned to Fermana in January 2020, who then sold him to Pro Vercelli on 5 October 2020, in a swap deal with Lorenzo Grossi.

On 29 August 2023, Clemented joined Ancona on loan.
