= Andrea Romagnoli =

Italian footballer (born 1998)

Personal information
- Date of birth: 29 July 1998 (age 28)
- Place of birth: Civitavecchia, Italy
- Height: 1.87 m (6 ft 2 in)
- Position: Goalkeeper

Youth career
- –2018: Roma

Senior career*
Years	Team	Apps	(Gls)
2016–2019	Roma	0	(0)
2018–2019	→ Renate (loan)	0	(0)
2019	→ Pistoiese (loan)	2	(0)
2019–2021	Spartak-2 Moscow	1	(0)
2021–2022	Catanzaro	0	(0)
2022–2023	Virtus Francavilla	5	(0)
2024–2025	Civitavecchia		
- * Club domestic league appearances and goals as of 23 April 2023

Andrea Romagnoli (born 29 July 1998) is an Italian footballer who plays as a goalkeeper.

== Career ==
=== Roma ===
He is a product of Roma youth teams and started playing for the Under-19 squad in the 2015–16 season. He played in the UEFA Youth League for Roma in the 2016–17 and 2017–18 seasons.

He made his first bench appearance for the senior squad in late 2016. He first appeared for the first squad on 1 September 2017 in a friendly against Chapecoense, as a 72nd-minute substitute for Bogdan Lobonț.

==== Loan to Renate ====
On 15 July 2018, he joined Serie C club Renate on loan. He made his only appearance for Renate on 29 July 2018 in a 2018–19 Coppa Italia game against Rezzato, remaining on the bench in every league game. His loan was terminated in January 2019, with Renate replacing him with Stefano Tarolli.

==== Loan to Pistoiese ====
On 23 January 2019, he moved on another loan to Serie C club Pistoiese until 30 June.

He made his Serie C debut for Pistoiese on 27 April 2019 in a game against Arzachena. He ended the loan with 2 appearances.

=== Spartak Moscow ===
On 26 June 2019, Romagnoli arrived to Moscow for negotiations with Russian Premier League club FC Spartak Moscow. He was registered by Spartak on their FC Spartak-2 Moscow squad on 5 July 2019. He was transferred from Roma to Spartak in short succession after Ezequiel Ponce, Spartak paid 3 million euros for each transfer, even though that sum was considered significantly over market value for Romagnoli. Ponce had a 40% sell-on clause in his original agreement for the transfer to Roma, which meant that 40% of the transfer fee received by Roma from Spartak was owed by them to his pre-Roma club Newell's Old Boys. Newell's Old Boys lodged a complaint with FIFA's Players' Status Committee, claiming that the Romagnoli transfer value was artificially inflated and Ponce value artificially lowered, to reduce the money owed to the Argentinian club for the Ponce transfer. FIFA eventually rejected their claim, noting that even though Romagnoli transfer fee was unexpectedly high, there is no direct evidence of the scheme in the documented communications between Spartak and Roma.

In two seasons with Spartak-2, Romagnoli made one appearance in November 2020 game against FC Nizhny Novgorod, allowing 4 goals.

=== Catanzaro ===
On 18 August 2021, he signed a one-year contract with Serie C club Catanzaro. Romagnoli served as the back-up for Paolo Branduani through the season and remained on the bench in all Catanzaro's games.

=== Virtus Francavilla ===
On 7 September 2022, Romagnoli joined Virtus Francavilla in Serie C.
