= Cédric Soares =

Portuguese footballer (born 1991)

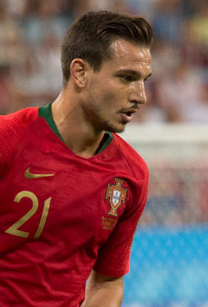
- Cédric playing for Portugal at the 2018 World Cup

Personal information
- Full name: Cédric Ricardo Alves Soares
- Date of birth: 31 August 1991 (age 35)
- Place of birth: Singen, Germany
- Height: 1.72 m (5 ft 8 in)
- Position: Full-back

Team information
- Current team: São Paulo
- Number: 21

Youth career
- 1998–2010: Sporting CP

Senior career*
Years	Team	Apps	(Gls)
2010–2015	Sporting CP	67	(2)
2011–2012	→ Académica (loan)	24	(0)
2012–2013	Sporting CP B	2	(0)
2015–2020	Southampton	120	(1)
2019	→ Inter Milan (loan)	4	(0)
2020	→ Arsenal (loan)	5	(1)
2020–2024	Arsenal	36	(1)
2023	→ Fulham (loan)	6	(0)
2025–	São Paulo	40	(0)

International career
2006–2007	Portugal U16	11	(1)
2007–2008	Portugal U17	11	(0)
2009	Portugal U18	5	(0)
2009–2010	Portugal U19	17	(0)
2010–2011	Portugal U20	18	(0)
2011–2012	Portugal U21	10	(0)
2014–2021	Portugal	34	(1)
Medal record
Men's football
Representing Portugal
UEFA European Championship
Winner	2016 France
FIFA Confederations Cup
Third place	2017 Russia
FIFA U-20 World Cup
Runner-up	2011 Colombia
- * Club domestic league appearances and goals as of 6 April 2026

Cédric Ricardo Alves Soares CvIH ComM (born 31 August 1991), known simply as Cédric (Portuguese pronunciation: [ˈsɛðɾik]), is a professional footballer who plays as a full-back for Campeonato Brasileiro Série A club São Paulo.

Cédric's career started with Sporting CP, going on to appear in 93 competitive games over the course of four Primeira Liga seasons and scoring two goals. He signed for Southampton in 2015. After a brief loan spell with Inter Milan in 2019, Cédric joined Arsenal in 2020. He played for Fulham on loan in 2023 before departing Arsenal a year later. In June 2025, Cédric joined São Paulo.

Born in Germany, Cédric made his senior debut for Portugal in 2014. He appeared for the country at the 2018 World Cup and Euro 2016, winning the latter tournament.

== Club career ==
=== Sporting ===
Born in Singen, Baden-Württemberg, Germany to Portuguese parents, Cédric returned to Portugal at the age of two. He joined Sporting CP's youth system in 1998, aged seven.

Cédric made his Primeira Liga debut with the first team on 8 May 2011, starting in a 0–1 home loss against Vitória de Setúbal. For 2011–12 he, alongside teammate Adrien Silva, was loaned to fellow top division club Académica, where he played regularly and won that season's Taça de Portugal, playing the full 90 minutes in the 1–0 triumph against Sporting.

Subsequently, Cédric returned to the Lisbon side, being first-choice in the following years under several managers. He scored his first goal in the Portuguese top division on 15 December 2012, netting with his left foot from 30 metres in a 1–1 draw away to Nacional.

In the domestic cup final on 31 May 2015, against Braga, Cédric was sent off in the 14th minute after conceding a penalty with a foul on Djavan, but Sporting eventually won in a shoot-out.

=== Southampton ===
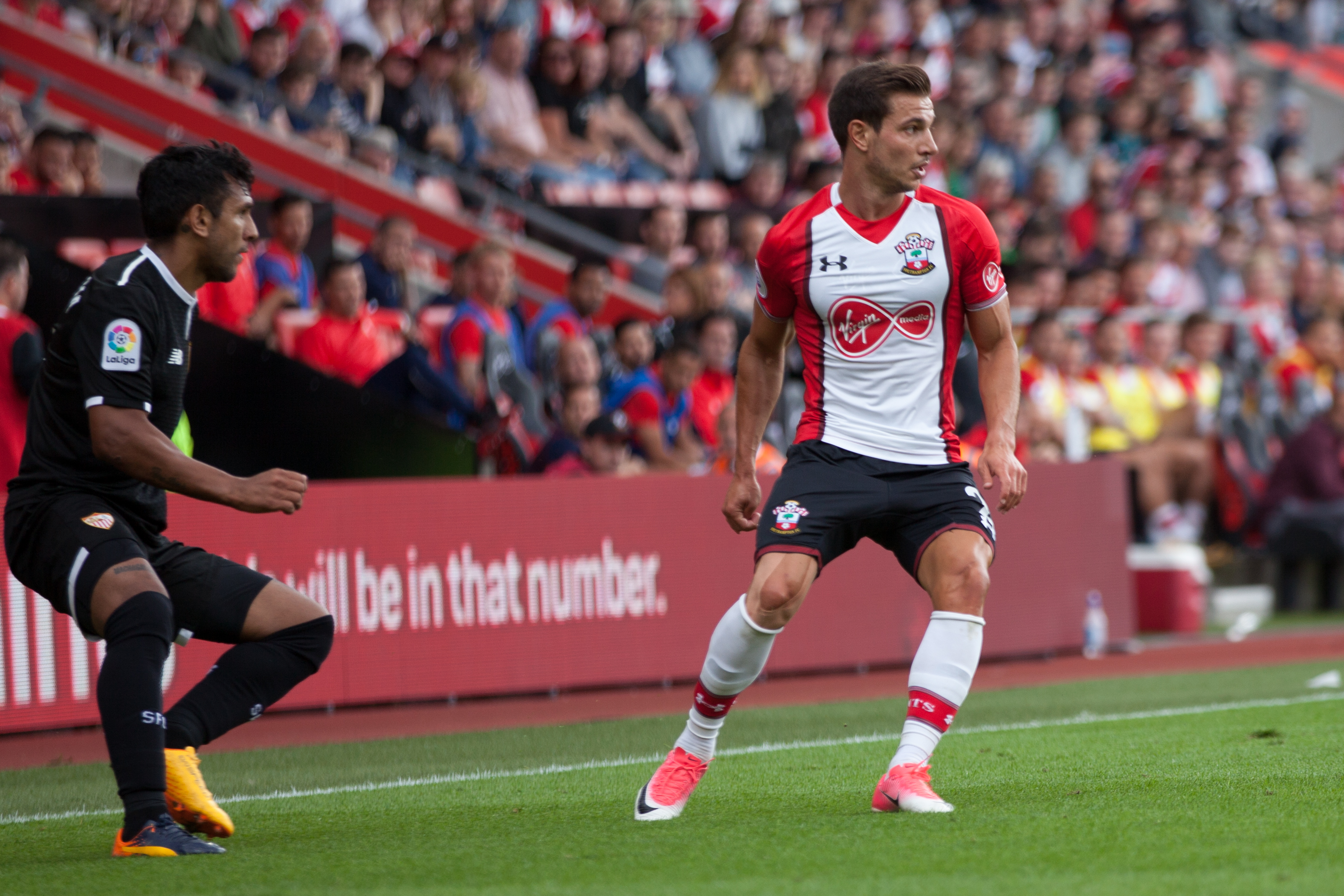
Cédric playing for Southampton in 2017

On 18 June 2015, Cédric was announced as the second summer signing for Southampton on a four-year contract, with the English club paying up to €6.5 million (£4.7 million) for his services. He made his debut on 30 July, playing the full 90 minutes in a 3–0 home win over Vitesse for the third qualifying round of the UEFA Europa League. Ten days later, he first appeared in the Premier League, assisting the opening goal for Graziano Pellè in a 2–2 draw away to Newcastle United before being substituted for Cuco Martina at half-time.

Cédric scored his first goal for Southampton on 18 March 2018, in a 2–0 victory away to Wigan Athletic in the sixth round of the FA Cup, the first match under new manager Mark Hughes.

==== Inter Milan (loan) ====
On 26 January 2019, Cédric moved to Inter Milan on loan for the rest of the season, with an option to purchase for £9.5m in the summer. He made his first appearance five days later, playing 15 minutes and converting his attempt in the 4–3 shoot-out loss against Lazio in the quarter-finals of the Coppa Italia (1–1 after 120 minutes).

=== Arsenal ===
Cédric joined fellow Premier League team Arsenal on a six-month loan on 31 January 2020. On 24 June, it was announced that Cédric had sealed a permanent move to Arsenal on a long-term deal, as a free transfer upon the expiry of his contract.

Cédric made his Arsenal debut on 1 July, coming on as a 77th-minute substitute and scoring a 20-yard strike with his left foot, four minutes after coming on, in a 4–0 victory over Norwich City. After playing for Southampton as a substitute in their FA Cup third-round tie against Huddersfield Town, Cédric was cup-tied and thus unable to take part in Arsenal's victorious 2019–20 FA Cup campaign.

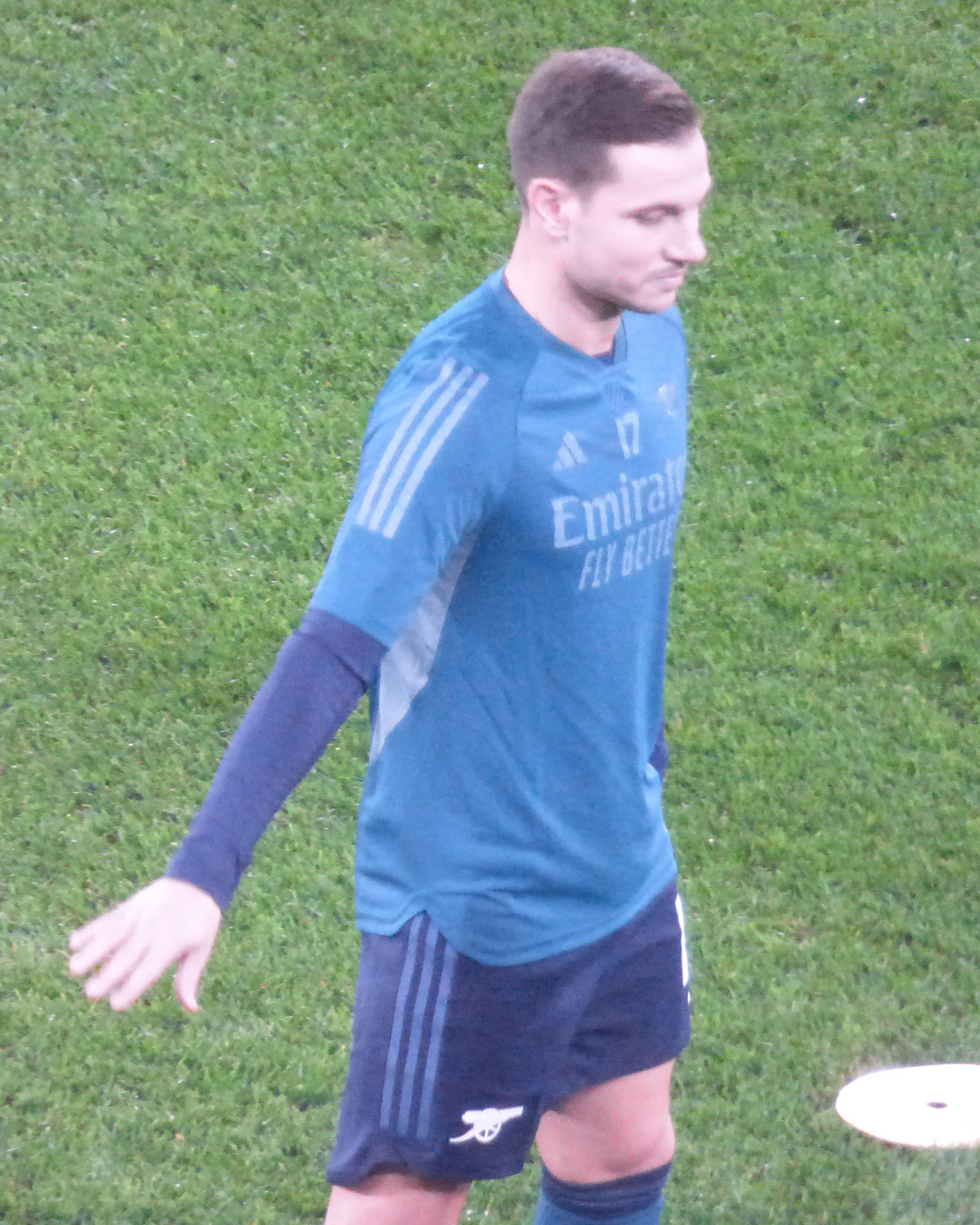
Cédric in October 2023

On 29 August, Cédric came on as a substitute, scoring Arsenal's third penalty in their shoot-out win against Liverpool in the Community Shield after the game ended 1–1. On 18 January 2021, Cédric made his first Premier League start of the season in a 3–0 win over Newcastle. He had a run in the team at left-back while Kieran Tierney was out injured.

Cédric scored his second goal for Arsenal on the final day of the 2021–22 Premier League season, finishing off a Bukayo Saka corner for Arsenal’s third goal in an eventual 5–1 win over Everton at the Emirates Stadium.

Cédric left Arsenal on 30 June 2024 at the expiration of his contract with the club.

==== Fulham (loan) ====
On 31 January 2023, Cédric joined fellow Premier League team Fulham on loan for the remainder of the season. He made his debut on 11 February against Nottingham Forest, coming on as a late substitute for Kenny Tete. His first start came on 28 February, in the FA Cup fifth round win against Leeds United.

=== São Paulo ===
On 27 January 2025, after being without professional activity since March 2024, Cédric signed a contract for just three months, extended to one year, with the Brazilian club São Paulo FC.

== International career ==
Cédric was part of the Portuguese under-20 team called up for the 2011 FIFA U-20 World Cup in Colombia, eventually finishing the tournament in second place.

He played ten times with the Portuguese under-21s, his debut occurring on 1 September 2011 in a 2–0 win in Moldova for the 2013 UEFA European Championship qualifiers. His maiden appearance with the senior team was on 11 October 2014, as he started in a 1–2 friendly defeat to France in Paris.

Cédric was selected by manager Fernando Santos for his UEFA Euro 2016 squad. His first game in the tournament took place on 25 June, when he started alongside Southampton teammate José Fonte in the round-of-16 clash against Croatia (1–0 win after extra time). He went on to retain his position until the final, won at the expense of hosts France.

He scored his first goal for his country on 17 June 2017, netting in the 86th minute of an eventual 2–2 group stage draw to Mexico at the 2017 FIFA Confederations Cup at the Kazan Arena in Russia. In May 2018, he was named in Portugal's squad for the 2018 FIFA World Cup.

In March 2021, Cédric was recalled to the national team for the first time since 2019, for the World Cup qualifying games. On 27 March, he started and provided an assist in a 2–2 draw against Serbia; this was his first game for Portugal since October 2018.

In October 2022, he was named in Portugal's preliminary 55-man squad for the 2022 FIFA World Cup in Qatar.

== Media ==
Cédric was involved in the Amazon Original sports docuseries All or Nothing: Arsenal, which documented the club by spending time with the coaching staff and players behind the scenes both on and off the field throughout their 2021–22 season.

== Career statistics ==
=== Club ===
As of match played 27 July 2025

Appearances and goals by club season, and competition
Club	Season	League			State league (Note: Includes Campeonato Paulista)		National cup (Note: Includes Taça de Portugal, FA Cup, Coppa Italia)		League cup (Note: Includes Taça da Liga, Football League/EFL Cup)		Continental		Other		Total	
Club	Season	Division	Apps	Goals	Apps	Goals	Apps	Goals	Apps	Goals	Apps	Goals	Apps	Goals	Apps	Goals
Sporting CP	2010–11	Primeira Liga	2	0	—		0	0	1	0	2 (Note: Appearance(s) in UEFA Europa League)	0	—		5	0
Sporting CP	2012–13	Primeira Liga	13	1	—		0	0	3	0	7	0	—		23	1
Sporting CP	2013–14	Primeira Liga	28	1	—		0	0	3	0	—		—		31	1
Sporting CP	2014–15	Primeira Liga	24	0	—		3	0	0	0	7 (Note: Two appearances in UEFA Champions League, five appearances in UEFA Europa League)	0	—		34	0
Sporting CP	Total		67	2	—		3	0	7	0	16	0	—		93	2
Académica (loan)	2011–12	Primeira Liga	24	0	—		5	0	0	0	—		—		29	0
Sporting CP B	2012–13	Segunda Liga	2	0	—		—		—		—		—		2	0
Southampton	2015–16	Premier League	24	0	—		0	0	2	0	1	0	—		27	0
Southampton	2016–17	Premier League	30	0	—		0	0	3	0	1	0	—		34	0
Southampton	2017–18	Premier League	32	0	—		4	1	0	0	—		—		36	1
Southampton	2018–19	Premier League	18	1	—		2	0	2	0	—		—		22	1
Southampton	2019–20	Premier League	16	0	—		1	0	2	1	—		—		19	1
Southampton	Total		120	1	—		7	1	9	1	2	0	—		138	3
Inter Milan (loan)	2018–19	Serie A	4	0	—		1	0	—		4	0	—		9	0
Arsenal (loan)	2019–20	Premier League	5	1	—		0	0	—		—		—		5	1
Arsenal	2020–21	Premier League	10	0	—		2	0	2	0	9	0	1 (Note: Appearance in FA Community Shield)	0	24	0
Arsenal	2021–22	Premier League	21	1	—		1	0	4	0	—		—		26	1
Arsenal	2022–23	Premier League	2	0	—		0	0	1	0	1	0	—		4	0
Arsenal	2023–24	Premier League	3	0	—		0	0	1	0	1 (Note: Appearance(s) in UEFA Champions League)	0	0	0	5	0
Arsenal	Total		41	2	—		3	0	8	0	11	0	1	0	64	2
Arsenal U21	2023–24	—			—		—		—		—		1 (Note: Appearances in EFL Trophy)	0	1	0
Fulham (loan)	2022–23	Premier League	6	0	—		2	0	—		—		—		8	0
São Paulo	2025	Série A	15	1	7	0	2	0	—		5 (Note: Appearances in Copa Libertadores)	0	—		29	1
Career total			269	6	7	0	23	1	24	1	38	0	2	0	363	8

=== International ===
As of match played 27 March 2021

Appearances and goals by national team and year
National team	Year	Apps	Goals
Portugal	2014	2	0
Portugal	2015	6	0
Portugal	2016	8	0
Portugal	2017	9	1
Portugal	2018	8	0
Portugal	2021	1	0
Total		34	1

As of match played 27 March 2021. Portugal score listed first, score column indicates score after each Cédric goal.

List of international goals scored by Cédric Soares
No.	Date	Venue	Cap	Opponent	Score	Result	Competition	Ref.
1	18 June 2017	Kazan Arena, Kazan, Russia	20	Mexico	2–1	2–2	2017 FIFA Confederations Cup	

== Honours ==
Académica

- Taça de Portugal: 2011–12

Sporting

- Taça de Portugal: 2014–15

Southampton

- EFL Cup runner-up: 2016–17

Arsenal

- FA Community Shield: 2020

Portugal U20

- FIFA U-20 World Cup runner-up: 2011

Portugal

- UEFA European Championship: 2016

Orders

- Knight of the Order of Prince Henry
- Commander of the Order of Merit
