= 2011–12 Associação Académica de Coimbra – O.A.F. season =

Académica
2011–12 season
- President: José Eduardo Simões
- Head coach: Pedro Emanuel
- Stadium: Estádio Cidade de Coimbra
- Primeira Liga: 13th
- Taça de Portugal: Winner
- Taça da Liga: Second round
- Top goalscorer: League: Edinho (5); All: Adrien Silva (8)
- Highest home attendance: 14,357 vs Oliveirense (12 January 2012)
- Lowest home attendance: 524 vs Penafiel (13 November 2011)
- Average home league attendance: 5,491

== Competitions ==
=== Primeira Liga ===
==== League table ====
Pos	Team	Pld	W	D	L	GF	GA	GD	Pts	Qualification or relegation
11	Vitória de Setúbal	30	8	6	16	24	49	−25	30	
12	Beira-Mar	30	8	5	17	26	38	−12	29 (Note: Beira-Mar ahead of Académica on head-to-head record; Académica–Beira-Mar 0–1, Beira-Mar–Académica 2–1)	
13	Académica	30	7	8	15	27	38	−11	29	Qualification to Europa League group stage (Note: Académica qualified for the group stage of 2012–13 UEFA Europa League after winning the 2011–12 Taça de Portugal.)
14	Rio Ave	30	7	7	16	33	42	−9	28	
15	Feirense (R)	30	5	9	16	27	49	−22	24	Relegation to Segunda Liga

Source: LPFP (in Portuguese)
Rules for classification: 1) Points; 2) Head-to-head points; 3) Head-to-head goal difference; 4) Head-to-head away goals scored; 5) Goal difference; 6) Matches won; 7) Goals scored; 8) Play-off.
(Note: LPFP decided that only criteria 1, 5, 6 and 7 would be applied to establish the classification during the competition.)
(R) Relegated

=== Taça de Portugal Millenium ===
==== Third round ====
16 October 2011 Third round	Académica	1–0	Oriental	Coimbra
15:00 WEST (UTC+01:00)	Berger 30'			Stadium: Estádio Cidade de Coimbra; Referee: André Gralha

==== Fourth round ====
19 November 2011 Fourth round	Académica	3–0	Porto	Coimbra
20:00 WET (UTC+00:00)	Marinho 64'; Adrien 81'; Valente 89'			Stadium: Estádio Cidade de Coimbra; Referee: Bruno Paixão

==== Fifth round ====
4 December 2011 Fifth round	Leixões	2–5 (a.e.t.)	Académica	Matosinhos
19:15 WET (UTC+00:00)	Jumisse 40'; Paulo Tavares 65' (pen.)		Adrien 38', 97'; Fábio Luís 84', 99'; Eder 120'	Stadium: Estádio do Mar; Referee: Marco Ferreira

==== Quarter-finals ====
21 December 2011 Quarter-final	Académica	3–2	Aves	Coimbra
19:00 WET (UTC+00:00)	Eder 5'; Berger 38'; Abdoulaye 75'		Pires 11'; Bischoff 90'	Stadium: Estádio Cidade de Coimbra; Referee: João Capela

==== Semi-finals ====
12 January 2012 1st Leg	Académica	1–0	Oliveirense	Coimbra
	Pape Sow 90'			Stadium: Estádio Cidade de Coimbra; Referee: Carlos Xistra

7 February 2012 2nd Leg	Oliveirense	2–2	Académica	Santa Maria da Feira
	Clemente 18'; Adriano 28' (pen.)		Marinho 20', 55'	Stadium: Estádio Marcolino de Castro; Referee: Marco Ferreira

==== Final ====
20 May 2012 Final	Sporting CP	0 – 1	Académica	Oeiras, Portugal
17:00 UTC+1			Marinho 4'	Stadium: Estádio Nacional; Attendance: 37,522; Referee: Paulo Baptista

=== Taça da Liga ===
==== Second round ====
8 October 2011 First leg	Penafiel	1–1	Académica	Penafiel
20:15 WEST (UTC+00:00)	Elízio 17'	Report	Adrien 60'	Stadium: Estádio Municipal 25 de Abril; Attendance: 973; Referee: Carlos Xistra

13 November 2011 Second leg	Académica	0–1	Penafiel	Coimbra
19:15 WET (UTC+00:00)		Report	Manoel 46'	Stadium: Estádio Cidade de Coimbra; Attendance: 524; Referee: Paulo Baptista
