= 2015–16 Southampton F.C. season =

Southampton F.C.
2015–16 season
- Chairman: Ralph Krueger
- Manager: Ronald Koeman
- Stadium: St Mary's Stadium
- Premier League: 6th
- FA Cup: Third round
- League Cup: Fifth round
- UEFA Europa League: Play-off round
- Top goalscorer: League: Graziano Pellè; Sadio Mané (11 each); All: Sadio Mané (15)
- Highest home attendance: 31,688 vs Chelsea (27 February 2016)
- Lowest home attendance: 28,399 vs Watford (13 January 2016)
- Average home league attendance: 30,750
Home colours	Away colours	Third colours

The 2015–16 Southampton F.C. season was the club's 17th season in the Premier League and their 39th in the top division of English football. It was also the club's first season in a European competition since 2003–04. Southampton finished the season in sixth place in the Premier League, having won 18, drawn 9 and lost 11 of their 38 matches. This result is the highest club finish in the Premier League and the highest Premier League points total (63) in the club's history. Aside from the league, the club was eliminated from the third round of the FA Cup, the fifth round of the League Cup, and the qualifying play-off round of the UEFA Europa League.

Following the end of the 2014–15 campaign, Southampton released seven first team players. The club also sold right-back Nathaniel Clyne to Liverpool, midfielder Morgan Schneiderlin to Manchester United, and striker Emmanuel Mayuka to French side Metz. Three players were sent out on season-long loans to Football League sides – Sam Gallagher to Milton Keynes Dons, Jack Stephens to Middlesbrough, and Jordan Turnbull to Swindon Town – while Jason McCarthy and Lloyd Isgrove were sent out on loans until January.

In the summer transfer window, the Saints made seven full signings – striker Juanmi from Málaga, right-backs Cédric Soares and Cuco Martina from Sporting CP and FC Twente, respectively, midfielder Jordy Clasie from Feyenoord, defensive midfielder Oriol Romeu from Chelsea, goalkeeper Harry Lewis from Shrewsbury Town, and centre-back Virgil van Dijk from Celtic. The club also brought in Fulham goalkeeper Maarten Stekelenburg and Queens Park Rangers centre-back Steven Caulker on season-long loans.

In January 2016, the club signed striker Charlie Austin from Queens Park Rangers. Caulker's loan agreement was cut short to allow him to move to Liverpool, while both Gallagher and Stephens returned to Southampton early. Also loaned out were Sam McQueen to Southend United, Gastón Ramírez to Middlesbrough, Ryan Seager to Crewe Alexandra, and Stephens to Coventry City, while Isgrove's loan spell at Barnsley was extended until the end of the season. In addition, young goalkeeper Harry Isted was released.

Senegalese forward Sadio Mané finished the 2015–16 season as Southampton's top scorer, with 15 goals in all competitions; Mané and Italian striker Graziano Pellè finished as joint top scorers in the Premier League, with 11 goals each. Irish striker Shane Long won the fan-voted Southampton F.C. Player of the Season award presented by the Southern Daily Echo, while Dutch defender Virgil van Dijk won the Fans' and Players' Player of the Season awards presented by the club. Saints manager Ronald Koeman won the Premier League Manager of the Month award in January 2016, while goalkeeper Fraser Forster won the Premier League Player of the Month award in February 2016.

== Pre-season ==
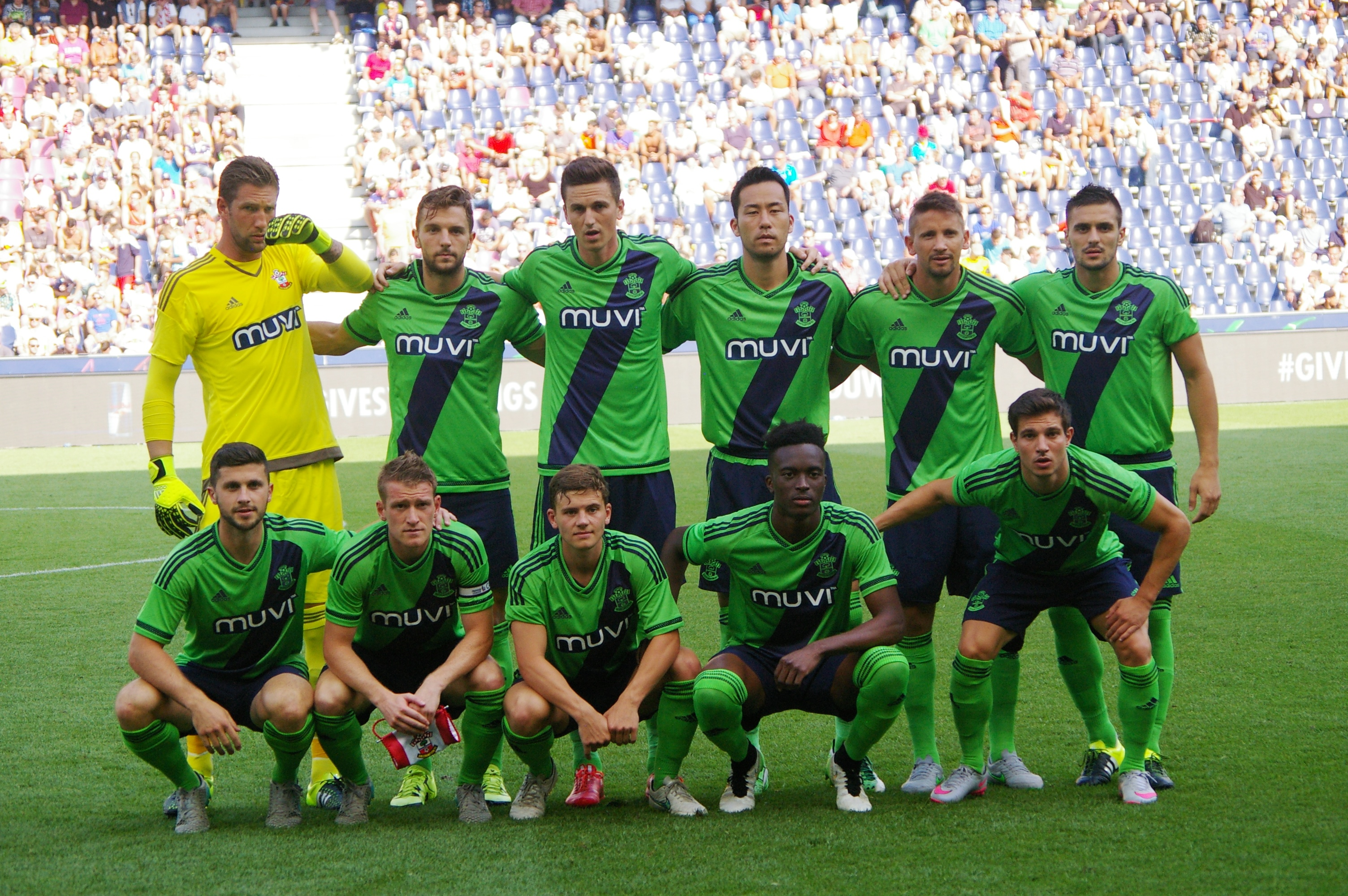
Southampton's lineup for the Audi Quattro Cup on 11 July 2015.

Southampton began their pre-season preparations in Austria with a friendly against German side RB Leipzig on 8 July 2015, which they lost 5–4. New signings Juanmi and Cédric Soares scored their first goals for the club, while Jay Rodriguez returned from a long-term injury to strike twice in the game. Three days later, the club competed in the Audi Quattro Cup semi-final against Spanish club Valencia, losing 1–0 thanks to a goal scored by Pablo Piatti. Both Sadio Mané and José Fonte hit the crossbar during the game, but Valencia advanced to the final. In the third-place playoff match against hosts Red Bull Salzburg, the Saints lost 2–0, thus finishing fourth in the tournament.

On 15 July, Southampton faced Brighton & Hove Albion in a private match at the Staplewood training ground. The Saints won the game 1–0, with Sam McQueen scoring the only goal in the final minute. Three days later, they beat Dutch club FC Groningen 3–0 thanks to goals from captain Fonte, Mané and Graziano Pellè. They later beat Quick '20 10–0 on 21 July, with goals including hat-tricks from Pellè and Rodriguez. The Saints won their last match in the Netherlands on 23 July, beating Feyenoord 3–0 with goals from Pellè, Maya Yoshida and Juanmi.

The club finished their pre-season preparations at St Mary's Stadium against Spanish side RCD Espanyol on 2 August. The hosts went 1–0 down early on through a goal by Salva Sevilla, but equalised through Rodriguez in the last five minutes to finish the game 1–1.

8 July 2015 Friendly	RB Leipzig	5–4	Southampton	Bischofshofen, Austria
18:00 CEST	Quaschner 24'; Mauer 55'; Sebastian 59'; Kalmár 66'; Strauß 75'	Report	Juanmi 25'; Rodriguez 53', 90'; Soares 79'	Stadium: Sportklub Bischofshofen

11 July 2015 Audi Quattro Cup; Semi-Final	Valencia	1–0	Southampton	Salzburg, Austria
15:00 BST	Piatti 23'	Report		Stadium: Red Bull Arena; Attendance: 10,832

11 July 2015 Audi Quattro Cup; Third-Place Playoff	Red Bull Salzburg	2–0	Southampton	Salzburg, Austria
17:10 BST	Nielsen 19'; Oberlin 23'	Report		Stadium: Red Bull Arena; Attendance: 10,832

15 July 2015 Friendly	Southampton	1–0	Brighton & Hove Albion	Southampton
14:00 BST	McQueen 89'	Report		Stadium: Staplewood

18 July 2015 Friendly	Groningen	0–3	Southampton	Groningen, Netherlands
13:30 BST		Report	Fonte 24'; Mané 52'; Pellè 72'	Stadium: Euroborg; Attendance: 12,176

21 July 2015 Friendly	Quick '20	0–10	Southampton	Oldenzaal, Netherlands
18:00 BST		Report	Davis 1', 39'; Pellè 12', 28', 42'; Rodriguez 15', 27', 87'; Turnbull 51'; Juanmi 61'	Stadium: Sportpark Vondersweijde

23 July 2015 Friendly	Feyenoord	0–3	Southampton	Rotterdam, Netherlands
19:00 BST		Report	Pellè 41'; Yoshida 61'; Juanmi 83'	Stadium: De Kuip

2 August 2015 Friendly	Southampton	1–1	RCD Espanyol	Southampton
15:00 BST	Rodriguez 85'	Report	Sevilla 11'	Stadium: St Mary's Stadium; Attendance: 14,730; Referee: Michael Jones

== Premier League ==
=== August–October 2015 ===
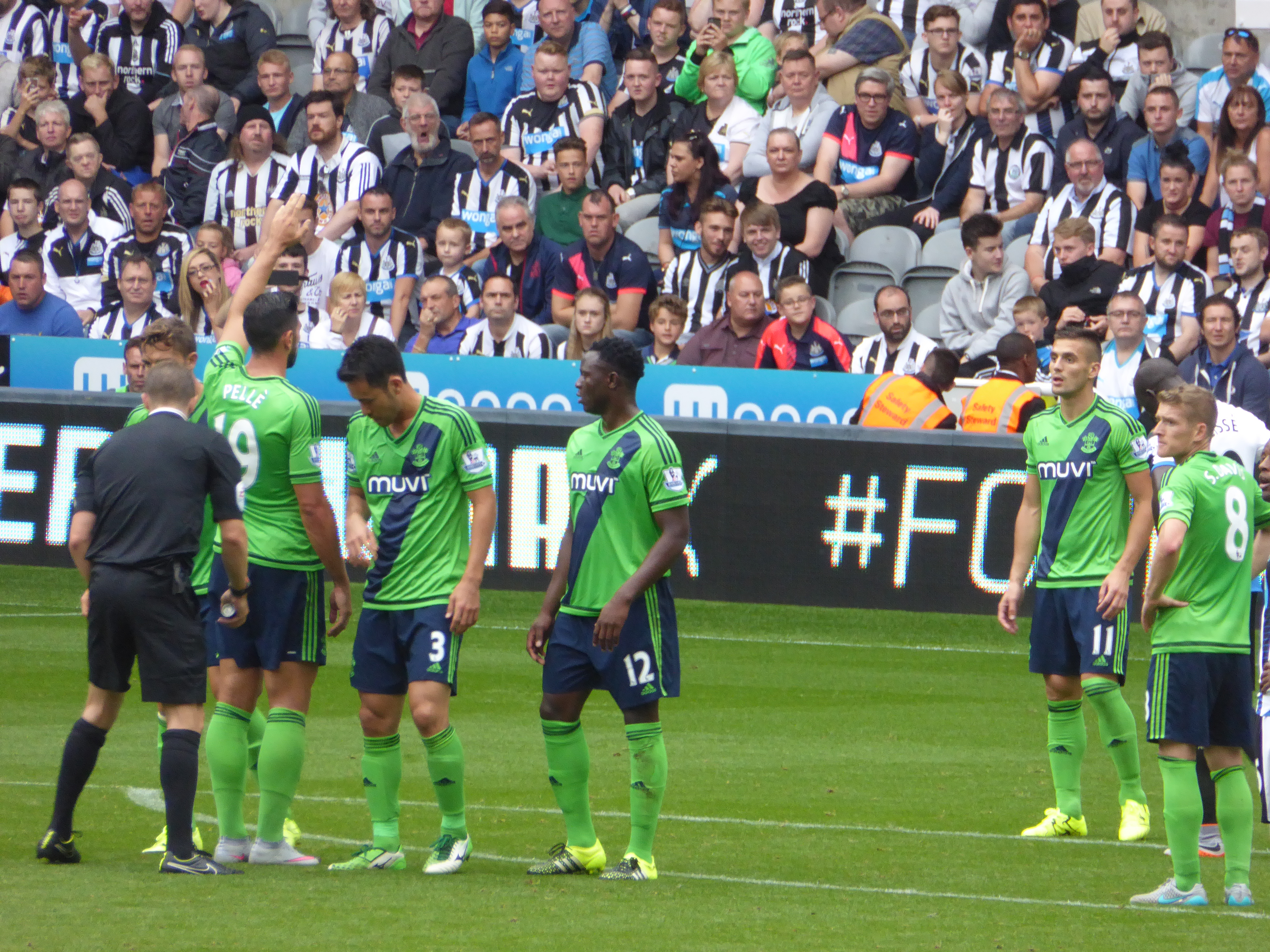
Southampton's first game of the season was a 2–2 draw at Newcastle United.

Southampton began their 2015–16 Premier League campaign at Newcastle United, drawing 2–2. Graziano Pellè opened the scoring for the Saints, before Papiss Cissé equalised for the hosts just before half-time. Newcastle scored again shortly after the break through Georginio Wijnaldum, but Shane Long equalised for the visitors in the 79th minute. The following week they lost 3–0 at home to Everton, thanks to two goals from Romelu Lukaku and one from Ross Barkley. The slow start to the season continued, as the Saints drew with recently promoted Watford on 23 August, before they won their first game on at the end of the month by beating Norwich City 3–0. Goals came from Pellè and two from Dušan Tadić.

Two weeks later, Southampton travelled to face West Bromwich Albion, which ended in another goalless draw. The club next faced Manchester United at St Mary's Stadium on 20 September, losing 3–2 to drop to 16th in the league. Pellè opened the scoring early on, before Anthony Martial equalised for the visitors shortly before half-time. A second goal from Pellè was not enough for the Saints to beat United, who scored two more through a Martial second and a Juan Mata winner. The club picked up their second win of the season against Swansea City on 26 September, winning 3–1 with goals from Virgil van Dijk (his first for the club), Tadić and Sadio Mané.

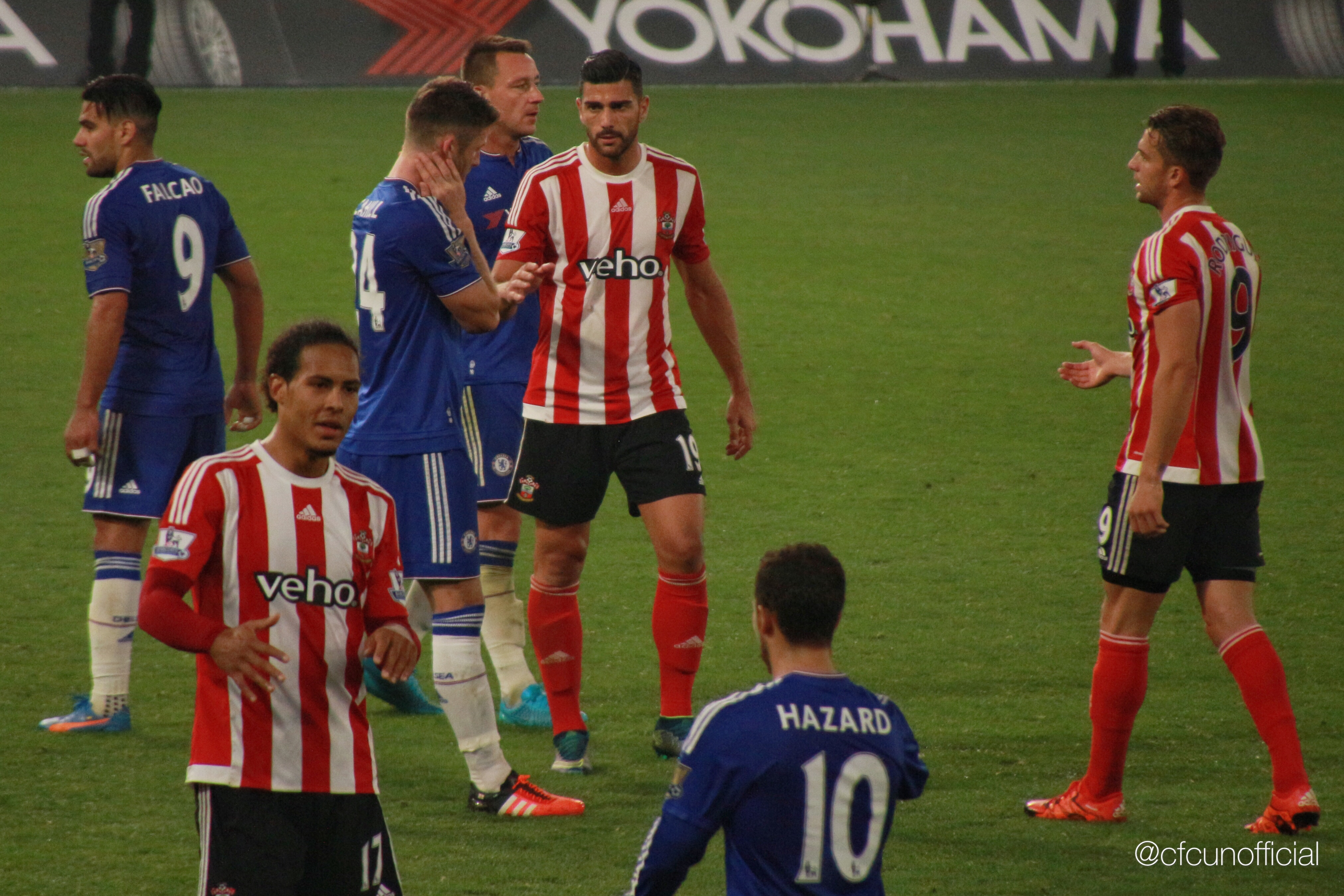
The club beat league champions Chelsea 3–1 on 3 October 2015.

On 3 October, the Saints travelled to face Premier League champions Chelsea, picking up their third win of the season. The hosts took an early lead through Willian, before midfielder Steven Davis equalised just before half-time. Sadio Mané took advantage of a defensive error to put Southampton in the lead on 60 minutes, before Graziano Pellè scored his fifth of the campaign to make it 3–1 for the visitors. On 17 October, the team hosted Leicester City, drawing 2–2 and moving up to eighth in the table. Southampton scored both goals in the first half, courtesy of defenders José Fonte and Virgil van Dijk, before Jamie Vardy scored two goals in the final 30 minutes of the match to give Leicester a point. On 25 October, Southampton travelled at Anfield to face Liverpool. A goal from Sadio Mané with four minutes left of regulation time cancelled out a Christian Benteke strike and resulted in a 1–1 draw.

=== November–December 2015 ===
To begin November, Southampton hosted local rivals AFC Bournemouth in the first top-flight meeting between the two South Coast sides. Two first half goals in quick succession from Steven Davis and Graziano Pellè secured the 2–0 win, moving Southampton up in the table to seventh. The following week, the Saints traveled north to face Sunderland, where a Dušan Tadić penalty in the 69th minute (after Ryan Bertrand was taken down by Yann M'Vila) ensured the team claimed all three points, after strong efforts from Steven Davis and José Fonte were cleared from the line. After a week's break, Southampton hosted Stoke City on 21 November but lost 1–0. With only one shot on target, the Saints could not cancel out the early goal from Bojan, slipping down to eighth in the table. Southampton picked up a second consecutive loss the following week against title contenders Manchester City, who won relatively comfortably thanks to goals from Kevin De Bruyne, Fabian Delph and Aleksandar Kolarov. Shane Long scored a consolation for the visitors.

Southampton's first game in December against Aston Villa ended in a 1–1 draw to see the Saints slip further down the table into 12th. Joleon Lescott opened for Villa on the verge of half time, before Oriol Romeu equalised for the hosts later in the game. The following week, they went a fourth game without a win as they lost 1–0 to Crystal Palace. Yohan Cabaye scored the only goal of the game shortly before the break, with the Saints failing to pressurise Palace for long periods of the match. The Saints lost another game the following week at home to Tottenham Hotspur, who won 2–0 thanks to goals from Harry Kane and Dele Alli, both within the last five minutes of the first half.

On Boxing Day the Saints beat second-placed Arsenal 4–0 at St Mary's. Cuco Martina opened the scoring on his first league start for the club, Shane Long scored the second ten minutes after half time, captain José Fonte scored his second of the season and Long scored a second in injury time to complete the win. Two days later, Southampton lost 2–1 at West Ham United, missing out on the chance to move up to ninth in the table. The Saints opened the scoring within 15 minutes thanks to a Carl Jenkinson own goal, but former Southampton loanee Michail Antonio and Andy Carroll scored for the hosts in the final third of the game to pick up the win.

=== January–February 2016 ===
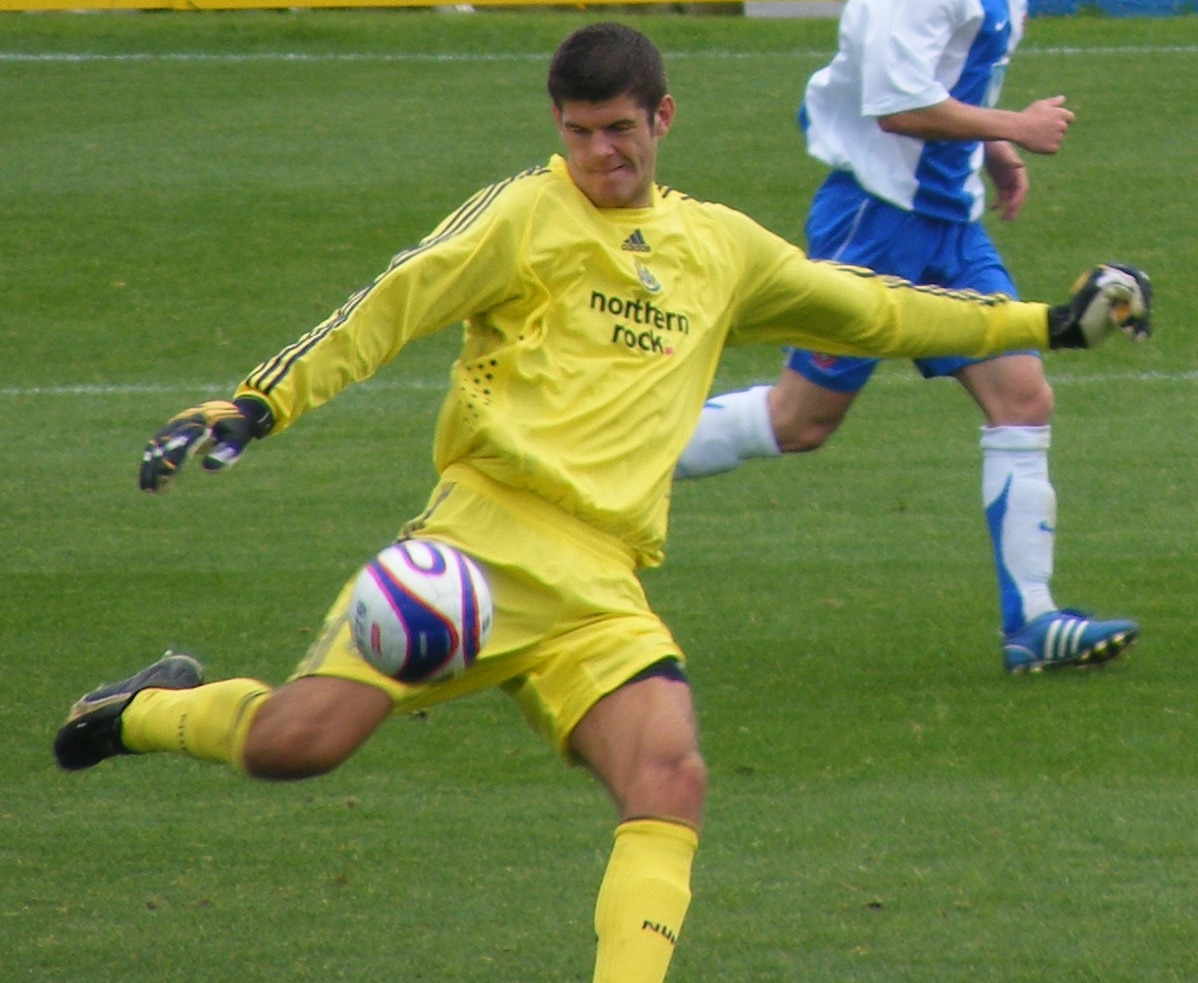
Goalkeeper Fraser Forster won the Premier League Player of the Month award in February after returning from injury.

In their first game of 2016, Southampton lost 1–0 to Norwich City, dropping to 13th in the Premier League table. Alexander Tettey scored the only goal of the match late in the second half, shortly after Victor Wanyama was sent off for the Saints. On 13 January, Southampton beat Watford 2–0 at home to move back up to 12th in the table. Shane Long headed in the opener in the 17th minute from a Matt Targett delivery, before substitute Dušan Tadić secured the win in the second half with a close range effort. Three days later the Saints beat West Brom 3–0 with two goals from James Ward-Prowse and one from Dušan Tadić to move up to tenth in the table. The following week, Southampton picked up their third consecutive league win, over Manchester United at Old Trafford. The only goal in the game came just before full-time courtesy of new signing Charlie Austin.

On 2 February, Southampton travelled to the Emirates Stadium to face Arsenal, which ended in a goalless draw. Goalkeeper Fraser Forster was named the man of the match, after making a string of impressive saves to keep a clean sheet for the visitors. The club beat West Ham 1–0 later in the week, extending their run of consecutive clean sheets to five games, with defender Maya Yoshida scoring the only goal of the game within the first ten minutes. On 13 February, Southampton travelled to face Swansea, winning 1–0 and advancing to sixth in the Premier League table. Shane Long scored the only goal of the game in the second half, levelling Graziano Pellè as the season's top scorer. Two weeks later, the Saints lost their first game in almost two months when Chelsea won 2–1 at St Mary's. Shane Long opened the scoring in the first half, before Cesc Fàbregas and Branislav Ivanović scored late on for the win.

=== March–May 2016 ===
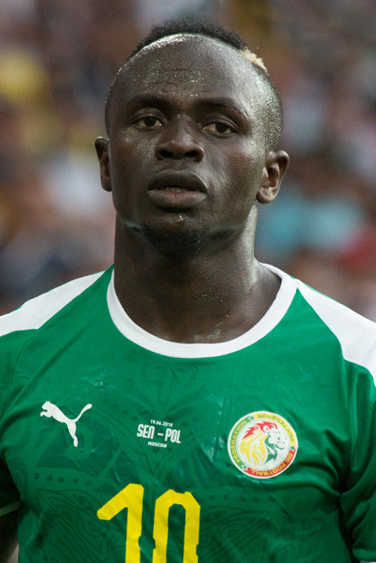
Sadio Mané scored six goals in the last five league games to overtake Graziano Pellè as the season's overall top scorer.

On 1 March, Southampton lost 2–0 to local rivals AFC Bournemouth. Charlie Austin had the best chance for the Saints, but the Cherries won through goals from Steve Cook and Benik Afobe. Later in the week, the Saints hosted Sunderland and drew 1–1. Captain José Fonte was sent off during the game for a foul, before Jermain Defoe put the visitors ahead in the 85th minute. During injury time, Virgil van Dijk scored his third goal of the season to seal a point for the hosts. The Saints returned to winning ways the following week, beating Stoke to move up to seventh in the league. Graziano Pellè scored a brace in the first half to put Southampton ahead, and although Marko Arnautović brought one back for the hosts, they were unable to turn the game in their favour and it finished 2–1. Sadio Mané was sent off late in the game, although the red card was quickly overturned on appeal.

On 20 March, Southampton came from two goals down to beat Liverpool at home and remain seventh in the league. The visitors went 2–0 up within the first 25 minutes through Philippe Coutinho and Daniel Sturridge, before a third goal from Joe Allen was disallowed for offside in the 33rd minute. Shortly after the break, substitute Sadio Mané saw a penalty saved by Simon Mignolet, before the striker scored a first for the hosts. in the 64th minute. In the final ten minutes, the Saints scored two in three minutes through Graziano Pellè and Mané to seal victory. Two weeks later, the Saints lost 1–0 to league leaders Leicester. Wes Morgan scored the only goal of the game late in the first half to give Southampton their first loss in four matches. On 9 April, the club beat Newcastle 3–1 at home. Shane Long opened the scoring in the fourth minute, Graziano Pellè doubled the lead before half time, Victor Wanyama scored the third ten minutes after the break, and Andros Townsend scored for the visitors ten minutes later.

Southampton travelled to face Everton on 16 April, which ended in a 1–1 draw. After a goalless first half, Ramiro Funes Mori opened the scoring for the hosts in the 68th minute, before Sadio Mané equalised for the Saints less than ten minutes later. The following week, Southampton beat Aston Villa at Villa Park 4–2. Shane Long and Dušan Tadić put the Saints two up in the first half, although Ashley Westwood pulled one back for the hosts on the stroke of half time. Tadić and Westwood each scored their second goals after the break, before Sadio Mané secured the win for the visitors in injury time. On 1 May, Southampton beat Manchester City 4–2 at home to move up to seventh in the league table. Shane Long opened the scoring for the hosts, before Sadio Mané scored a hat trick to make it four. Kelechi Iheanacho scored both of the goals for the visitors. The following week, Southampton beat Tottenham 2–1, with both goals being scored by Steven Davis.

On 15 May 2016, in their final game of the season, Southampton beat Crystal Palace 4–1 at St Mary's Stadium. Sadio Mané opened the scoring with his 15th goal in all competitions just before half time to put the Saints 1–0 at the break. Graziano Pellè came on as a substitute in the second half and doubled the scoreline in the 61st minute, before former Southampton midfielder Jason Puncheon pulled one back for Palace. Defender Ryan Bertrand scored his only goal of the season in a penalty kick in the 75th minute, before Steven Davis finished the scoring in the final five minutes of normal time to complete the win. The win, as well as results in other matches, saw Southampton move up to fifth in the Premier League table and secure a return to the UEFA Europa League the following season. Manchester United later won their final rescheduled fixture 3–1 against AFC Bournemouth at Old Trafford two days, finalising Southampton's league position for the 2015–16 Premier League season at a club-record sixth.

=== League table ===
Pos	Team	Pld	W	D	L	GF	GA	GD	Pts	Qualification or relegation
4	Manchester City	38	19	9	10	71	41	+30	66	Qualification for the Champions League play-off round
5	Manchester United	38	19	9	10	49	35	+14	66	Qualification for the Europa League group stage (Note: Manchester United qualified for the Europa League group stage by winning the 2015–16 FA Cup. As they had also qualified by their virtue of their league position (5th), this spot was passed to the next-highest ranked team (6th), Southampton.)
6	Southampton	38	18	9	11	59	41	+18	63	Qualification for the Europa League group stage
7	West Ham United	38	16	14	8	65	51	+14	62	Qualification for the Europa League third qualifying round (Note: Manchester City qualified for the Europa League third qualifying round by winning the 2015–16 Football League Cup. However, since they already qualified for European competition based on their league position, the spot awarded to the League Cup winners was passed to the next best-placed team (seventh-placed West Ham United).)
8	Liverpool	38	16	12	10	63	50	+13	60	

Source: Barclays Premier League
Rules for classification: 1) Points; 2) Goal difference; 3) Goals scored; 4) Play-offs (only if needed to decide champion, teams for relegation or teams for UEFA competitions).

==== Results summary ====
Overall								Home						Away					
Pld	W	D	L	GF	GA	GD	Pts	W	D	L	GF	GA	GD	W	D	L	GF	GA	GD
38	18	9	11	59	41	+18	63	11	3	5	39	22	+17	7	6	6	20	19	+1

Last updated: 15 May 2016.
Source: Premier League

=== Results by matchday ===
Matchday	1	2	3	4	5	6	7	8	9	10	11	12	13	14	15	16	17	18	19	20	21	22	23	24	25	26	27	28	29	30	31	32	33	34	35	36	37	38
Ground	A	H	A	H	A	H	H	A	H	A	H	A	H	A	H	A	H	H	A	A	H	H	A	A	H	A	H	A	H	A	H	A	H	A	A	H	A	H
Result	D	L	D	W	D	L	W	W	D	D	W	W	L	L	D	L	L	W	L	L	W	W	W	D	W	W	L	L	D	W	W	L	W	D	W	W	W	W
Position	10	16	18	10	11	16	9	9	8	8	7	7	8	10	12	12	12	12	12	13	12	10	8	7	7	6	7	7	8	7	7	7	7	7	8	7	6	6

Updated to match(es) played on 15 May 2016. Source: BBC Match Reports
A = Away; H = Home; W = Win; D = Draw; L = Loss

=== Matches ===
9 August 2015 1	Newcastle United	2–2	Southampton	Newcastle upon Tyne
13:30 BST	Cissé 42'; Wijnaldum 48'	Report	Pellè 24'; Long 79'	Stadium: St James' Park; Attendance: 49,019; Referee: Craig Pawson

15 August 2015 2	Southampton	0–3	Everton	Southampton
12:30 BST		Report	Lukaku 22', 45'; Barkley 84'	Stadium: St Mary's Stadium; Attendance: 30,966; Referee: Michael Oliver

23 August 2015 3	Watford	0–0	Southampton	Watford
16:00 BST		Report		Stadium: Vicarage Road; Attendance: 20,166; Referee: Andre Marriner

30 August 2015 4	Southampton	3–0	Norwich City	Southampton
13:30 BST	Pellè 45'; Tadić 64', 67'	Report		Stadium: St Mary's Stadium; Attendance: 29,573; Referee: Jonathan Moss

12 September 2015 5	West Bromwich Albion	0–0	Southampton	West Bromwich
15:00 BST		Report		Stadium: The Hawthorns; Attendance: 24,265; Referee: Stuart Attwell

20 September 2015 6	Southampton	2–3	Manchester United	Southampton
16:00 BST	Pellè 13', 86'	Report	Martial 34', 50'; Mata 68'	Stadium: St Mary's Stadium; Attendance: 31,588; Referee: Mark Clattenburg

26 September 2015 7	Southampton	3–1	Swansea City	Southampton
15:00 BST	Van Dijk 11'; Ki 54' (o.g.); Mané 61'	Report	Sigurðsson 83' (pen.)	Stadium: St Mary's Stadium; Attendance: 30,704; Referee: Roger East

3 October 2015 8	Chelsea	1–3	Southampton	London
17:30 BST	Willian 10'	Report	S. Davis 43'; Mané 60'; Pellè 72'	Stadium: Stamford Bridge; Attendance: 41,642; Referee: Robert Madley

17 October 2015 9	Southampton	2–2	Leicester City	Southampton
15:00 BST	Fonte 21'; Van Dijk 37'	Report	Vardy 66', 90+1'	Stadium: St Mary's Stadium; Attendance: 30,966; Referee: Paul Tierney

25 October 2015 10	Liverpool	1–1	Southampton	Liverpool
16:15 GMT	Benteke 77'	Report	Mané 86'	Stadium: Anfield; Attendance: 44,171; Referee: Andre Marriner

1 November 2015 11	Southampton	2–0	AFC Bournemouth	Southampton
16:00 GMT	S. Davis 31'; Pellè 36'	Report		Stadium: St. Mary's Stadium; Attendance: 31,229; Referee: Craig Pawson

7 November 2015 12	Sunderland	0–1	Southampton	Sunderland
15:00 GMT		Report	Tadić 69' (pen.)	Stadium: Stadium of Light; Attendance: 41,781; Referee: Mike Jones

21 November 2015 13	Southampton	0–1	Stoke City	Southampton
15:00 GMT		Report	Bojan 10'	Stadium: St Mary's Stadium; Attendance: 30,039; Referee: Lee Mason

28 November 2015 14	Manchester City	3–1	Southampton	Manchester
15:00 GMT	De Bruyne 9'; Delph 20'; Kolarov 69'	Report	Long 49'	Stadium: City of Manchester Stadium; Attendance: 54,102; Referee: Roger East

5 December 2015 15	Southampton	1–1	Aston Villa	Southampton
15:00 GMT	Romeu 73'	Report	Lescott 44'	Stadium: St Mary's Stadium; Attendance: 29,645; Referee: Anthony Taylor

12 December 2015 16	Crystal Palace	1–0	Southampton	London
15:00 GMT	Cabaye 38'	Report		Stadium: Selhurst Park; Attendance: 24,914; Referee: Mike Dean

19 December 2015 17	Southampton	0–2	Tottenham Hotspur	Southampton
15:00 GMT		Report	Kane 40'; Alli 43'	Stadium: St Mary's Stadium; Attendance: 31,636; Referee: Kevin Friend

26 December 2015 18	Southampton	4–0	Arsenal	Southampton
19:45 GMT	Martina 19'; Long 55', 90+2'; Fonte 69'	Report		Stadium: St Mary's Stadium; Attendance: 31,669; Referee: Jonathan Moss

28 December 2015 19	West Ham United	2–1	Southampton	London
17:30 GMT	Antonio 69'; Carroll 79'	Report	Jenkinson 13' (o.g.)	Stadium: Boleyn Ground; Attendance: 34,977; Referee: Michael Oliver

2 January 2016 20	Norwich City	1–0	Southampton	Norwich
15:00 GMT	Tettey 76'	Report		Stadium: Carrow Road; Attendance: 27,022; Referee: Mark Clattenburg

13 January 2016 21	Southampton	2–0	Watford	Southampton
19:45 GMT	Long 17'; Tadić 73'	Report		Stadium: St Mary's Stadium; Attendance: 28,399; Referee: Craig Pawson

16 January 2016 22	Southampton	3–0	West Bromwich Albion	Southampton
15:00 GMT	Ward-Prowse 5', 35' (pen.); Tadić 72'	Report		Stadium: St Mary's Stadium; Attendance: 29,622; Referee: Martin Atkinson

23 January 2016 23	Manchester United	0–1	Southampton	Manchester
15:00 GMT		Report	Austin 87'	Stadium: Old Trafford; Attendance: 75,408; Referee: Mike Jones

2 February 2016 24	Arsenal	0–0	Southampton	London
19:45 GMT		Report		Stadium: Emirates Stadium; Attendance: 60,044; Referee: Lee Mason

6 February 2016 25	Southampton	1–0	West Ham United	Southampton
17:30 GMT	Yoshida 9'	Report		Stadium: St Mary's Stadium; Attendance: 29,161; Referee: Mark Clattenburg

13 February 2016 26	Swansea City	0–1	Southampton	Swansea
15:00 GMT		Report	Long 69'	Stadium: Liberty Stadium; Attendance: 20,890; Referee: Jonathan Moss

27 February 2016 27	Southampton	1–2	Chelsea	Southampton
15:00 GMT	Long 42'	Report	Fàbregas 75'; Ivanović 89'	Stadium: St Mary's Stadium; Attendance: 31,688; Referee: Martin Atkinson

1 March 2016 28	AFC Bournemouth	2–0	Southampton	Bournemouth
19:45 GMT	Cook 31'; Afobe 79'	Report		Stadium: Dean Court; Attendance: 11,033; Referee: Mike Dean

5 March 2016 29	Southampton	1–1	Sunderland	Southampton
15:00 GMT	Van Dijk 90+3'	Report	Defoe 85'	Stadium: St Mary's Stadium; Attendance: 31,458; Referee: Neil Swarbrick

12 March 2016 30	Stoke City	1–2	Southampton	Stoke-on-Trent
15:00 GMT	Arnautović 52'	Report	Pellè 11', 30'	Stadium: Britannia Stadium; Attendance: 27,833; Referee: Lee Mason

20 March 2016 31	Southampton	3–2	Liverpool	Southampton
13:30 GMT	Mané 64', 86'; Pellè 83'	Report	Coutinho 17'; Sturridge 22'	Stadium: St Mary's Stadium; Attendance: 31,596; Referee: Roger East

3 April 2016 32	Leicester City	1–0	Southampton	Leicester
13:30 BST	Morgan 38'	Report		Stadium: King Power Stadium; Attendance: 32,071; Referee: Michael Oliver

9 April 2016 33	Southampton	3–1	Newcastle United	Southampton
15:00 BST	Long 4'; Pellè 38'; Wanyama 55'	Report	Townsend 65'	Stadium: St Mary's Stadium; Attendance: 31,542; Referee: Bobby Madley

16 April 2016 34	Everton	1–1	Southampton	Liverpool
15:00 BST	Funes Mori 68'	Report	Mané 76'	Stadium: Goodison Park; Attendance: 36,761; Referee: Craig Pawson

23 April 2016 35	Aston Villa	2–4	Southampton	Birmingham
15:00 BST	Westwood 45+1', 85'	Report	Long 15'; Tadić 39', 71'; Mané 90+4'	Stadium: Villa Park; Attendance: 29,729; Referee: Neil Swarbrick

1 May 2016 36	Southampton	4–2	Manchester City	Southampton
16:30 BST	Long 25'; Mané 28', 57', 68'	Report	Iheanacho 44', 78'	Stadium: St Mary's Stadium; Attendance: 31,472; Referee: Andre Marriner

8 May 2016 37	Tottenham Hotspur	1–2	Southampton	London
13:30 BST	Son 16'	Report	S. Davis 31', 72'	Stadium: White Hart Lane; Attendance: 35,748; Referee: Jonathan Moss

15 May 2016 38	Southampton	4–1	Crystal Palace	Southampton
15:00 BST	Mané 43'; Pellè 61'; Bertrand 75' (pen.); S. Davis 87'	Report	Puncheon 64'	Stadium: St Mary's Stadium; Attendance: 31,313; Referee: Michael Oliver

== FA Cup ==
Crystal Palace (9 January 2016)

In the third round of the 2015–16 FA Cup, Southampton hosted fellow Premier League side Crystal Palace on 9 January 2016, losing the game 2–1 to exit the tournament. Joel Ward opened the scoring for the visitors in the 29th minute to give Palace a 1–0 lead at half-time. Oriol Romeu scored for the Saints shortly after the break, but Wilfried Zaha scored a winner in the 68th minute to eliminate Southampton from the cup.

9 January 2016 Round 3	Southampton	1–2	Crystal Palace	Southampton
15:00 GMT	Romeu 51'	Report	Ward 29'; Zaha 68'	Stadium: St Mary's Stadium; Attendance: 30,763; Referee: Lee Mason

== League Cup ==
Milton Keynes Dons (23 September 2015)

Southampton was drawn in the third round of the 2015–16 League Cup against Championship side Milton Keynes Dons. The Saints won the match easily 6–0. Jay Rodriguez opened the scoring in the fifth minute, Sadio Mané doubled the lead five minutes later, and later scored a second in the 25th minute to put Southampton 3–0 up by half-time. After the break, Rodriguez scored a second from a penalty, before Shane Long scored two within seven minutes of one another to increase the visitors' tally to six.

Aston Villa (28 October 2015)

In the fourth round, Southampton drew Premier League side Aston Villa at home. Two second half goals from Maya Yoshida in the 51st minute and Graziano Pellè in the 77th minute were enough to defeat caretaker manager Kevin MacDonald's side, despite an injury time penalty from Scott Sinclair that made the final score 2–1.

Liverpool (2 December 2015)

For the fifth round, Premier League side Liverpool visited St Mary's Stadium. After a quick opening goal from Sadio Mané in the first minute, Jürgen Klopp's side scored three goals in the first half and three goals in the second half with a brace from Daniel Sturridge, a hat-trick by Divock Origi and one from Jordon Ibe.

23 September 2015 Round 3	Milton Keynes Dons	0–6	Southampton	Denbigh, Milton Keynes
19:45 BST		Report	Rodriguez 5', 48' (pen.); Mané 10', 25'; Long 68', 75'	Stadium: Stadium mk Attendance: 10,189; Referee: Keith Stroud

28 October 2015 Round 4	Southampton	2–1	Aston Villa	Southampton
19:45 BST	Yoshida 51'; Pellè 77'	Report	Sinclair 90' (pen.)	Stadium: St Mary's Stadium; Attendance: 31,314; Referee: Keith Stroud

2 December 2015 Round 5	Southampton	1–6	Liverpool	Southampton
19:45 BST	Mané 1'	Report	Sturridge 25', 29'; Origi 45', 68', 86'; Ibe 73'	Stadium: St Mary's Stadium; Attendance: 31,592; Referee: Robert Madley

== UEFA Europa League ==
Vitesse (30 July and 6 August 2015)

Southampton entered the 2015–16 UEFA Europa League in the third qualifying round. Their first game took place against Dutch side Vitesse on 30 July 2015, which the Saints won 3–0 at St Mary's Stadium. Graziano Pellè found the net first in the 36th minute to put Southampton one up, before Dušan Tadić scored a penalty just before half time. Substitute Shane Long finished the scoring late in the second half to win the game for the home side. In the second leg Southampton won 2–0, therefore advancing to the play-off round 5–0 on aggregate. Pellè scored again to put the Saints up in the fourth minute, with Sadio Mané doubling his side's lead just a minute before the end of the match.

Midtjylland (20 and 27 August 2015)

In the qualifying play-off round, Southampton faced Midtjylland. In the first leg the Saints drew 1–1 with the Danish champions, with Jay Rodriguez equalising after Tim Sparv's opener on the stroke of half-time. In the second leg, Midtjylland striker Morten Rasmussen scored the only goal of the game to ensure the Danish side won 2–1 on aggregate to eliminate Southampton from the competition.

30 July 2015 Qualifying round 3 First Leg	Southampton	3–0	Vitesse	Southampton
20:05 BST	Pellè 36'; Tadić 45' (pen.); Long 84'	Report		Stadium: St Mary's Stadium; Attendance: 30,580; Referee: Jesús Gil Manzano (Spain)

6 August 2015 Qualifying round 3 Second Leg	Vitesse	0–2 (0–5 agg.)	Southampton	Arnhem, Netherlands
19:00 BST		Report	Pellè 4'; Mané 89'	Stadium: GelreDome; Attendance: 20,515; Referee: Ilias Spathas (Greece)

20 August 2015 Play-off Round; First Leg	Southampton	1–1	Midtjylland	Southampton
20:00 BST	Rodriguez 56' (pen.)	Report	Sparv 45'	Stadium: St Mary's Stadium; Attendance: 28,890; Referee: Clément Turpin (France)

27 August 2015 Play-off Round; Second Leg	Midtjylland	1–0 (2–1 agg.)	Southampton	Herning, Denmark
20:45 CEST	Rasmussen 28'	Report		Stadium: MCH Arena; Attendance: 9,481; Referee: Liran Liany (Israel)

== Squad statistics ==
No.	Pos.	Nat.	Name	League		FA Cup		League Cup		Europe		Total		Discipline	
No.	Pos.	Nat.	Name	Apps.	Gls.	Apps.	Gls.	Apps.	Gls.	Apps.	Gls.	Apps.	Gls.	Yellow card	Red card
1	GK	(England)	Kelvin Davis	1	0	0	0	0	0	0	0	1	0	0	0
2	DF	(Portugal)	Cédric Soares	23(1)	0	0	0	2	0	1	0	26(1)	0	3	0
3	DF	(Japan)	Maya Yoshida	10(10)	1	1	0	1(1)	1	4	0	16(11)	2	0	0
4	MF	(Netherlands)	Jordy Clasie	20(2)	0	1	0	1	0	1	0	23(2)	0	5	0
5	DF	(Romania)	Florin Gardoș	0	0	0	0	0	0	0	0	0	0	0	0
6	DF	(Portugal)	José Fonte	37	2	1	0	1	0	4	0	43	2	4	1
7	FW	(Republic of Ireland)	Shane Long	23(5)	10	1	0	1(1)	2	0(3)	1	25(9)	13	3	0
8	MF	(Northern Ireland)	Steven Davis	31(3)	5	1	0	2(1)	0	3	0	37(4)	5	5	0
9	FW	(England)	Jay Rodriguez	3(9)	0	0	0	1	2	2(1)	1	6(10)	3	2	0
10	FW	(Senegal)	Sadio Mané	30(7)	11	1	0	2	3	3	1	36(7)	15	6	1
11	MF	(Serbia)	Dušan Tadić	27(7)	7	0(1)	0	1(1)	0	2(1)	1	30(10)	8	3	0
12	MF	(Kenya)	Victor Wanyama	29(1)	1	0	0	2	0	3	0	34(1)	1	6	3
14	MF	(Spain)	Oriol Romeu	17(12)	1	1	1	2(1)	0	2	0	22(13)	2	8	0
15	DF	(Curaçao)	Cuco Martina	11(4)	1	1	0	0	0	2	0	14(4)	1	2	0
16	MF	(England)	James Ward-Prowse	14(19)	2	0(1)	0	1(1)	0	3	0	18(21)	2	5	0
17	DF	(Netherlands)	Virgil van Dijk	34	3	1	0	3	0	0	0	38	3	2	0
18	MF	(England)	Harrison Reed	0(1)	0	0	0	0	0	0(2)	0	0(3)	0	0	0
19	FW	(Italy)	Graziano Pellè	23(7)	11	0	0	2	1	4	2	29(7)	14	7	0
20	FW	(Spain)	Juanmi	0(12)	0	0(1)	0	2	0	0(4)	0	2(17)	0	0	0
21	DF	(England)	Ryan Bertrand	32	1	0	0	1(1)	0	0	0	33(1)	1	6	0
22	GK	(Netherlands)	Maarten Stekelenburg	17	0	1	0	3	0	4	0	25	0	1	0
25	GK	(Argentina)	Paulo Gazzaniga	2	0	0	0	0	0	0	0	2	0	0	0
28	FW	(England)	Charlie Austin	2(5)	1	0	0	0	0	0	0	2(5)	1	0	0
33	DF	(England)	Matt Targett	13(1)	0	1	0	2	0	3	0	19(1)	0	2	0
40	FW	(England)	Sam Gallagher	0	0	0	0	0	0	0	0	0	0	0	0
44	GK	(England)	Fraser Forster	18	0	0	0	0	0	0	0	18	0	0	0
Players with appearances who left the club before the end of the season.
26	DF	(England)	Steven Caulker	1(2)	0	0	0	2	0	3	0	6(2)	0	0	0
Players with appearances who ended the season out on loan.
23	MF	(Uruguay)	Gastón Ramírez	0(3)	0	0	0	1(1)	0	0	0	1(4)	0	0	0

=== Most appearances ===
No.	Pos.	Nat.	Name	League		FA Cup		League Cup		Europe		Total		
No.	Pos.	Nat.	Name	Strt.	Sub.	Strt.	Sub.	Strt.	Sub.	Strt.	Sub.	Strt.	Sub.	Total
1	DF	(Portugal)	José Fonte	37	0	1	0	1	0	4	0	43	0	43
1	FW	(Senegal)	Sadio Mané	30	7	1	0	2	0	3	1	36	7	43
3	MF	(Northern Ireland)	Steven Davis	31	3	1	0	2	1	3	0	37	4	41
4	MF	(Serbia)	Dušan Tadić	27	7	0	1	1	1	2	1	30	10	40
5	MF	(England)	James Ward-Prowse	14	19	0	1	1	1	3	0	18	21	39
6	DF	(Netherlands)	Virgil van Dijk	34	0	1	0	3	0	0	0	38	0	38
7	FW	(Italy)	Graziano Pellè	23	7	0	0	2	0	4	0	29	7	36
8	MF	(Kenya)	Victor Wanyama	29	1	0	0	2	0	3	0	34	1	35
8	MF	(Spain)	Oriol Romeu	17	12	1	0	2	1	2	0	22	13	35
10	DF	(England)	Ryan Bertrand	32	0	0	0	1	1	0	3	33	1	34
10	FW	(Republic of Ireland)	Shane Long	23	5	1	0	1	1	0	3	25	9	34

=== Top goalscorers ===
No.	Pos.	Nat.	Name	League		FA Cup		League Cup		Europe		Total		
No.	Pos.	Nat.	Name	Gls.	Apps.	Gls.	Apps.	Gls.	Apps.	Gls.	Apps.	Gls.	Apps.	GPG
1	FW	(Senegal)	Sadio Mané	11	36	0	1	3	2	1	3	15	43	0.34
2	FW	(Italy)	Graziano Pellè	11	30	0	0	1	2	2	4	14	36	0.38
3	FW	(Republic of Ireland)	Shane Long	10	28	0	1	2	2	1	3	13	34	0.38
4	MF	(Serbia)	Dušan Tadić	7	34	0	1	0	2	1	3	8	40	0.20
5	MF	(Northern Ireland)	Steven Davis	5	34	0	1	0	3	0	3	5	41	0.12
6	FW	(England)	Jay Rodriguez	0	12	0	0	2	1	1	3	3	16	0.18
6	DF	(Netherlands)	Virgil van Dijk	3	34	0	1	0	3	0	0	3	38	0.07
8	DF	(Japan)	Maya Yoshida	1	20	0	1	1	2	0	4	2	27	0.07
8	MF	(Spain)	Oriol Romeu	1	29	1	1	0	3	0	2	2	35	0.05
8	MF	(England)	James Ward-Prowse	2	33	0	1	0	2	0	3	2	39	0.05
8	DF	(Portugal)	José Fonte	2	37	0	1	0	1	0	4	2	43	0.04

== Transfers ==
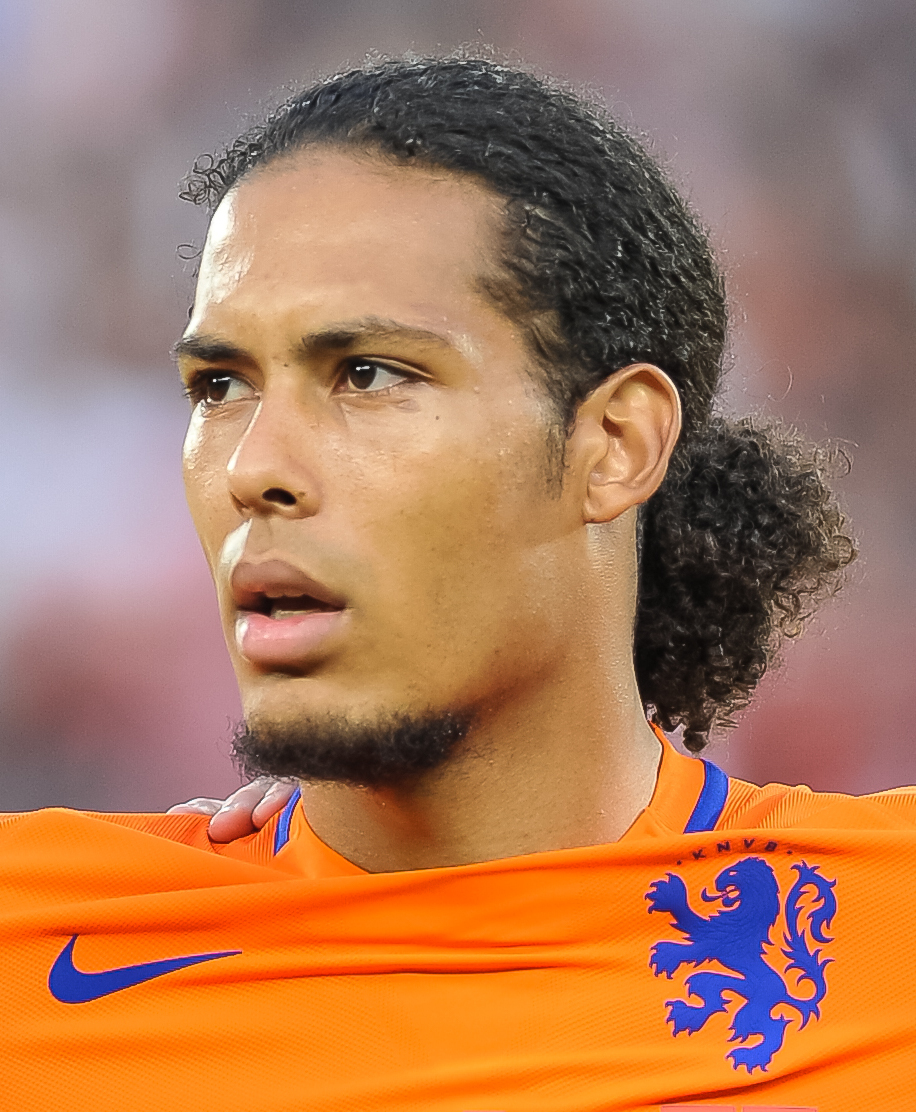
Virgil van Dijk, one of Southampton's multiple summer signings, won the club's Players' Player of the Season award.

Players transferred in
Date	Pos.	Name	Club	Fee	Ref.
1 July 2015	FW	(Spain) Juanmi	(Spain) Málaga	Undisclosed	
1 July 2015	DF	(Portugal) Cédric Soares	(Portugal) Sporting CP	£4,700,000	
7 July 2015	DF	(Curaçao) Cuco Martina	(Netherlands) Twente	Undisclosed	
15 July 2015	MF	(Netherlands) Jordy Clasie	(Netherlands) Feyenoord	Undisclosed	
12 August 2015	MF	(Spain) Oriol Romeu	(England) Chelsea	£5,000,000	
31 August 2015	GK	(England) Harry Lewis	(England) Shrewsbury Town	Undisclosed	
1 September 2015	DF	(Netherlands) Virgil van Dijk	(Scotland) Celtic	£13,000,000	
16 January 2016	FW	(England) Charlie Austin	(England) Queens Park Rangers	Undisclosed	
Players loaned in
Start date	Pos.	Name	Club	End date	Ref.
1 July 2015	GK	(Netherlands) Maarten Stekelenburg	(England) Fulham	End of season	
29 July 2015	DF	(England) Steven Caulker	(England) Queens Park Rangers	12 January 2016	
Players transferred out
Date	Pos.	Name	Club	Fee	Ref.
1 July 2015	DF	(England) Nathaniel Clyne	(England) Liverpool	£12,500,000	
13 July 2015	MF	(France) Morgan Schneiderlin	(England) Manchester United	Undisclosed	
31 August 2015	FW	(Zambia) Emmanuel Mayuka	(France) Metz	Undisclosed	
Players loaned out
Start date	Pos.	Name	Club	End date	Ref.
29 July 2015	FW	(England) Sam Gallagher	(England) Milton Keynes Dons	6 January 2016	
31 July 2015	DF	(England) Jack Stephens	(England) Middlesbrough	4 January 2016	
3 August 2015	DF	(England) Jordan Turnbull	(England) Swindon Town	End of season	
13 October 2015	DF	(England) Jason McCarthy	(England) Wycombe Wanderers	End of season	
24 October 2015	MF	(Wales) Lloyd Isgrove	(England) Barnsley	End of season	
21 January 2016	MF	(England) Sam McQueen	(England) Southend United	End of season	
26 January 2016	MF	(Uruguay) Gastón Ramírez	(England) Middlesbrough	End of season	
29 January 2016	FW	(England) Ryan Seager	(England) Crewe Alexandra	18 February 2016	
1 February 2016	DF	(England) Jack Stephens	(England) Coventry City	End of season	
Players released
Date	Pos.	Name	Subsequent club	Join date	Ref.
30 June 2015	GK	(Poland) Artur Boruc	(England) AFC Bournemouth	1 July 2015	
30 June 2015	GK	(United States) Cody Cropper	(England) Milton Keynes Dons	1 July 2015	
30 June 2015	DF	(Netherlands) Jos Hooiveld	(Sweden) AIK	10 July 2015	
30 June 2015	GK	(Northern Ireland) Chris Johns	(Northern Ireland) Bangor	4 September 2015	
30 June 2015	MF	(England) Omar Rowe	(England) Bishop's Stortford	15 October 2015	
30 June 2015	FW	(England) Jake Sinclair	(England) Froome Town	9 December 2015	
1 July 2015	FW	(Italy) Dani Osvaldo	(Portugal) Porto	5 August 2015	
21 January 2016	GK	(England) Harry Isted	(England) Stoke City	22 January 2016	
