= Gabriele Dalla Bernardina =

Italian footballer, defender

Personal information
- Date of birth: 11 January 1999 (age 27)
- Place of birth: Thiene, Italy
- Height: 1.90 m (6 ft 3 in)
- Position: Centre back

Team information
- Current team: Este
- Number: 5

Youth career
- 2014–2016: Alto Vicentino
- 2016–2017: Inter Milan
- 2017–2018: Cittadella

Senior career*
Years	Team	Apps	(Gls)
2018–2019	Cittadella	0	(0)
2019	→ Olbia (loan)	2	(0)
2019–2021	Olbia	14	(0)
2021	→ Lucchese (loan)	9	(0)
2021–2022	San Martino Speme	26	(1)
2022–2023	Levico Terme	31	(0)
2023–2024	Montecchio Maggiore	7	(0)
2024–	Este	29	(4)
- * Club domestic league appearances and goals as of 10 November 2025

Gabriele Dalla Bernardina (born 11 January 1999) is an Italian footballer who plays as a defender for Serie D club Este.

== Club career ==
He made his professional debut in the Coppa Italia for Cittadella on 4 December 2018 against Benevento, coming in as a substitute for Luca Ghiringhelli in the 57th minute.

On 31 January 2019, he joined Olbia on loan.

On 12 July 2019, he moved to Olbia on a permanent basis.

On 1 February 2021, he was loaned to Lucchese.

After spells with San Martino Speme, Levico Terme, and Montecchio Maggiore, he joined Este ahead of the 2024–25 season in Serie D, where he became a regular starter.
