= Adriano (footballer, born February 1994) =

Brazilian footballer

Personal information
- Full name: Adriano Louzada e Silva
- Date of birth: 16 February 1994 (age 32)
- Place of birth: Anchieta, Brazil
- Height: 1.79 m (5 ft 10 in)
- Position: Winger

Youth career
- Iriri
- Campo Grande
- Itaguaí AC
- 2008–2013: Reggina

Senior career*
Years	Team	Apps	(Gls)
2012–2015	Reggina	34	(2)
2015–2016	Internacional B	?	(?)
2016–2017	Matera	15	(1)
2017	Modena	5	(0)
2017–2018	Audace Cerignola	4	(1)
2018	Montescaglioso	6	(1)
2019	Albalonga Calcio		
- * Club domestic league appearances and goals as of 15 August 2018

Adriano Louzada e Silva (born 16 February 1994), known simply as Adriano, is a Brazilian footballer who plays as a winger.

== Career ==
Born in Anchieta, Espírito Santo, Adriano moved to Italy in 2008, aged 14, and joined Reggina Calcio's youth system. He made his professional debut on 26 May 2012, coming on as a second-half substitute in a 0–3 home loss to Vicenza Calcio.
