= Filippo Gemmi =

Italian footballer

Personal information
- Date of birth: 21 June 1997 (age 29)
- Place of birth: Pontedera, Italy
- Height: 1.78 m (5 ft 10 in)
- Position: Midfielder

Team information
- Current team: Real Forte Querceta

Senior career*
Years	Team	Apps	(Gls)
2016–2019	Livorno	20	(0)
2019	→ Olbia (loan)	10	(0)
2019–2020	Foggia	6	(0)
2020–2021	Follonica Gavorrano	6	(0)
2021	Adriese	10	(0)
2021–2022	Aglianese	28	(0)
2022–2023	Romana	27	(0)
2023–	Real Forte Querceta	4	(0)
- * Club domestic league appearances and goals as of 20 December 2023

Filippo Gemmi (born 21 June 1997) is an Italian footballer who plays for Serie D club Real Forte Querceta as a midfielder.

== Club career ==
On 31 January 2019, he joined Olbia on loan.

On 20 August 2019, he signed with Foggia.
