= Stefano Tarolli =

Italian footballer

Personal information
- Date of birth: 18 August 1997 (age 29)
- Place of birth: Foggia, Italy
- Height: 1.87 m (6 ft 2 in)
- Position: Goalkeeper

Team information
- Current team: Bitonto

Youth career
- –2012: Foggia
- 2012–2014: Virtus Lanciano

Senior career*
Years	Team	Apps	(Gls)
2014–2019	Foggia	6	(0)
2015	→ Piacenza (loan)	9	(0)
2016–2017	→ Manfredonia (loan)	38	(0)
2018–2019	→ Virtus Francavilla (loan)	7	(0)
2019	→ Renate (loan)	0	(0)
2020	Fidelis Andria	5	(0)
2020–2021	Arezzo	4	(0)
2021–2022	Di Benedetto Trinitapoli		
2022–2023	Bisceglie	0	(0)
2023–	Bitonto	3	(0)
- * Club domestic league appearances and goals as of 8 October 2023

Stefano Tarolli (born 18 August 1997) is an Italian footballer who plays as a goalkeeper for Serie D club Bitonto.

== Club career ==
On 1 February 2015, he joined Piacenza, on loan.

He made his Serie B debut for Foggia on 26 November 2017 in a game against Bari.

On 24 January 2019, he moved on another loan to Renate.

On 31 January 2020, he joined Serie D club Fidelis Andria.

On 28 September 2020 he signed with Serie C club Arezzo.
