= Federico Chiossi =

Italian footballer (born 1999)

Personal information
- Date of birth: 12 March 1999 (age 27)
- Place of birth: Modena, Italy
- Height: 1.81 m (5 ft 11 in)
- Position: Midfielder

Team information
- Current team: Villa Valle
- Number: 33

Youth career
- –2017: Modena
- 2017: → Atalanta (loan)
- 2017–2019: Atalanta

Senior career*
Years	Team	Apps	(Gls)
2016–2017	Modena	7	(0)
2019	Atalanta	0	(0)
2019	→ Robur Siena (loan)	0	(0)
2020–2023	Real Calepina	86	(2)
2023–	Villa Valle	17	(0)

International career^{‡}
2017	Italy U-18	4	(1)
- * Club domestic league appearances and goals as of 20 December 2023 ‡ National team caps and goals as of 17 May 2017

Federico Chiossi (born 12 March 1999) is an Italian footballer who plays for Serie D club Villa Valle.

== Club career ==
He made his Serie C debut for Modena on 22 October 2016 in a game against Venezia.

On 31 January 2019 he joined Robur Siena on loan until the end of the 2018–19 season.
