= Jack Stephens (footballer) =

English footballer (born 1994)

- Stephens with Southampton in 2025

Personal information
- Full name: Jack Stephens
- Date of birth: 27 January 1994 (age 32)
- Place of birth: Torpoint, England
- Height: 6 ft 1 in (1.85 m)
- Position: Defender

Team information
- Current team: Southampton
- Number: 5

Youth career
- 2005–2010: Plymouth Argyle

Senior career*
Years	Team	Apps	(Gls)
2010–2011	Plymouth Argyle	5	(0)
2011–	Southampton	208	(7)
2014	→ Swindon Town (loan)	10	(0)
2014–2015	→ Swindon Town (loan)	37	(1)
2015–2016	→ Middlesbrough (loan)	1	(0)
2016	→ Coventry City (loan)	16	(0)
2022–2023	→ Bournemouth (loan)	15	(0)

International career
2012	England U18	1	(0)
2012	England U19	4	(0)
2015	England U20	4	(0)
2015–2017	England U21	8	(1)
- * Club domestic league appearances and goals as of 15:32, 21 November 2026 (UTC)

Jack Stephens (born 27 January 1994) is an English professional footballer who plays as a defender for, and captains, EFL Championship club Southampton.

Born in Torpoint, Stephens began his career as a youth player with Plymouth Argyle, remaining with the club as a professional until he joined Southampton in 2011. Stephens had loan spells with Swindon Town, Middlesbrough, and Coventry City before making his league debut with Southampton in January 2017. He spent the 2022–23 season on loan at Bournemouth.

Although starting his career as a right-back, Stephens has been converted into a centre-back. He can also operate as a left-back, or in a defensive midfielder role, and has played internationally for the England under-18, under-19, under-20, and under-21 sides.

== Club career ==
=== Plymouth Argyle ===
Born in Torpoint, Cornwall, Stephens attended Torpoint Community College, and joined Plymouth Argyle in 2005 at the age of 11. He progressed to the club's youth team in 2009, after a number of impressive performances in the junior section of the Milk Cup. He was then promoted to the club's reserve team, having appeared regularly in the Youth Alliance. Stephens began training with the club's first team in September 2010 and was included in an 18-man squad for their league match against Sheffield Wednesday. He made his debut as a late substitute in a 3–2 win for Argyle. Primarily a right-back, Stephens can play in a variety of positions. "Jack is a right-back, but he can play in the centre as well. He's comfortable in both positions," said John James, the club's youth development officer. "I like him at right-back because he does get forward well, he's quick, he likes to take people on, and he's a good header of the ball. He's a big lad – 6 ft 1 in, I think – and he's still growing."

=== Southampton ===
==== 2011–2014 ====
Stephens joined Southampton on 5 April 2011 for a fee of £150,000, signing an initial three-year contract, and was assigned to the club's development squad. He made his first-team debut for Southampton in a 2–1 FA Cup win against Coventry City on 7 January 2012, appearing as a second-half substitute for Dan Harding. In 2012, he was promoted to the first team ahead of the club's return to the Premier League.

==== 2014–2016: Loan moves ====
On 13 March 2014, Stephens joined League One side Swindon Town on loan until 3 May. He returned to the club on 1 September 2014 on a loan deal running until January 2015, which was later extended to the end of the season. On 17 January 2015, he scored his first career goal, heading in Harry Toffolo's cross to open a 3–1 win over Chesterfield at the County Ground.

On 31 July 2015, Stephens signed a two-year contract extension, taking his deal to the summer of 2019, and subsequently completed a season-long move to Championship side Middlesbrough. However, in January 2016, he was recalled by manager Ronald Koeman who was not happy that Stephens had only been played in one league match for Middlesbrough. On 1 February, he joined League One side Coventry City on loan for the remainder of the season.

==== 2016–2022 ====
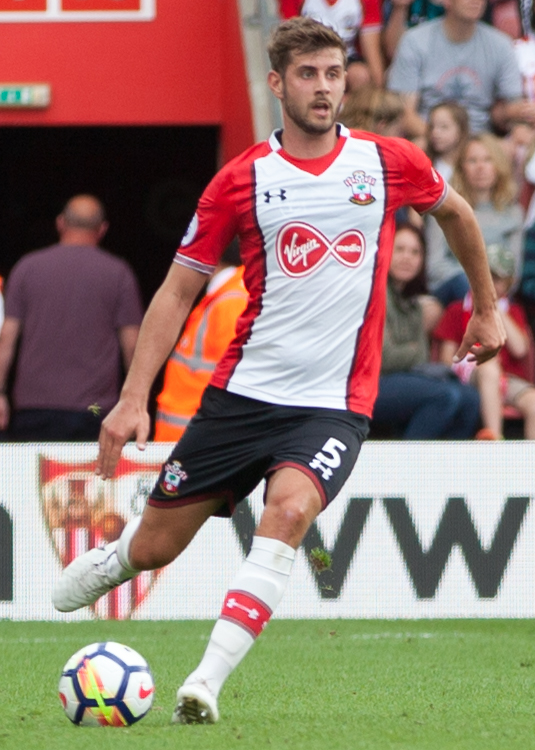
Stephens playing for Southampton in 2017

Stephens made his Premier League debut on 2 January 2017, coming on as a first-half substitute to replace the injured, Cédric Soares, in a 3–0 defeat to Everton. On 26 February 2017, Stephens featured in a 3–2 defeat against Manchester United in the EFL Cup final.

He scored his first goal for Southampton on 27 January 2018, in a 1–0 victory over Watford in the FA Cup, which was followed by his first Premier League goal four days later, when he equalised in a 1–1 draw with south coast rivals, Brighton & Hove Albion. His third goal in as many matches came in a 3–2 victory over fellow strugglers West Bromwich Albion on 3 February. On 8 April 2018, Stephens was given a red card for shoving Jack Wilshere during a 3–2 defeat to Arsenal.

During the 2018–19 season, Stephens scored in a 1–2 defeat to Cardiff City on 9 February 2019. Stephens ended the 2018–19 season with 29 appearances in all competitions.

On 29 October 2019, he scored his first goal of the 2019–20 season in a 3–1 defeat to Manchester City in the EFL Cup. His only Premier League goal of the season came on 21 December 2019, in a 3–1 away victory against Aston Villa. On 25 June 2020, Stephens received a red card during a 2–0 home defeat to Arsenal for a foul on Pierre-Emerick Aubameyang.

During the 2021–22 season, Stephens had played every minute in all competitions for Southampton until suffering a knee injury on 18 September 2021, in a 0–0 draw with Manchester City. Manager Ralph Hasenhüttl later confirmed he could be sidelined for 12 weeks. Stephens returned from injury on 11 December 2021, appearing in a 3–0 defeat to Arsenal.

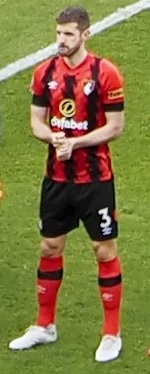
Stephens lining up for Bournemouth in 2023

==== 2022–2023: Loan to Bournemouth ====
Before his loan move to Bournemouth, Stephens made two appearances for Southampton in a 4–1 defeat against Tottenham Hotspur and a 2–2 draw with Leeds United. On 1 September 2022, Stephens completed a deadline day move and joined Bournemouth on a season-long loan. On 17 September 2022, he made his first appearance for Bournemouth in a 1–1 draw against Newcastle, replacing Philip Billing in the 89th minute. His first league start for Bournemouth came on 12 November 2022, in a 3–0 victory against Everton.

==== 2023–present ====
On 4 August 2023, Stephens signed a two-year contract extension with Southampton. On 11 August 2023, it was announced Stephens would become the club's new captain due to the potential departure of James Ward-Prowse, who left the club three days later. During a 2–1 victory against Queens Park Rangers on 26 August 2023, Stephens was forced off in the first half after suffering an injury to his left leg, with manager Russell Martin stating the club may need to "fear the worst". However, a few days later, Martin revealed the injury was "not as bad" as initially feared. On 16 December 2023, he made his first appearance since returning from injury in a 4–0 victory against Blackburn Rovers after replacing Taylor Harwood-Bellis in the 66th minute. Following Southampton's promotion to the Premier League, a one-year contract extension was triggered.

On 14 September 2024, Stephens received a red card during a 3–0 home defeat against Manchester United for a foul on Alejandro Garnacho, which resulted in a three-match suspension. He subsequently received a £50,000 fine and a further two-match suspension for misconduct after Stephens admitted to using abusive and insulting language towards referee Stuart Attwell and fourth official Gavin Ward. On 4 December 2024, Stephens received another red card during a 5–1 home defeat against Chelsea for pulling the hair of Marc Cucurella and was suspended for four matches.

On 9 July 2025, Stephens signed a three-year contract extension.

== International career ==
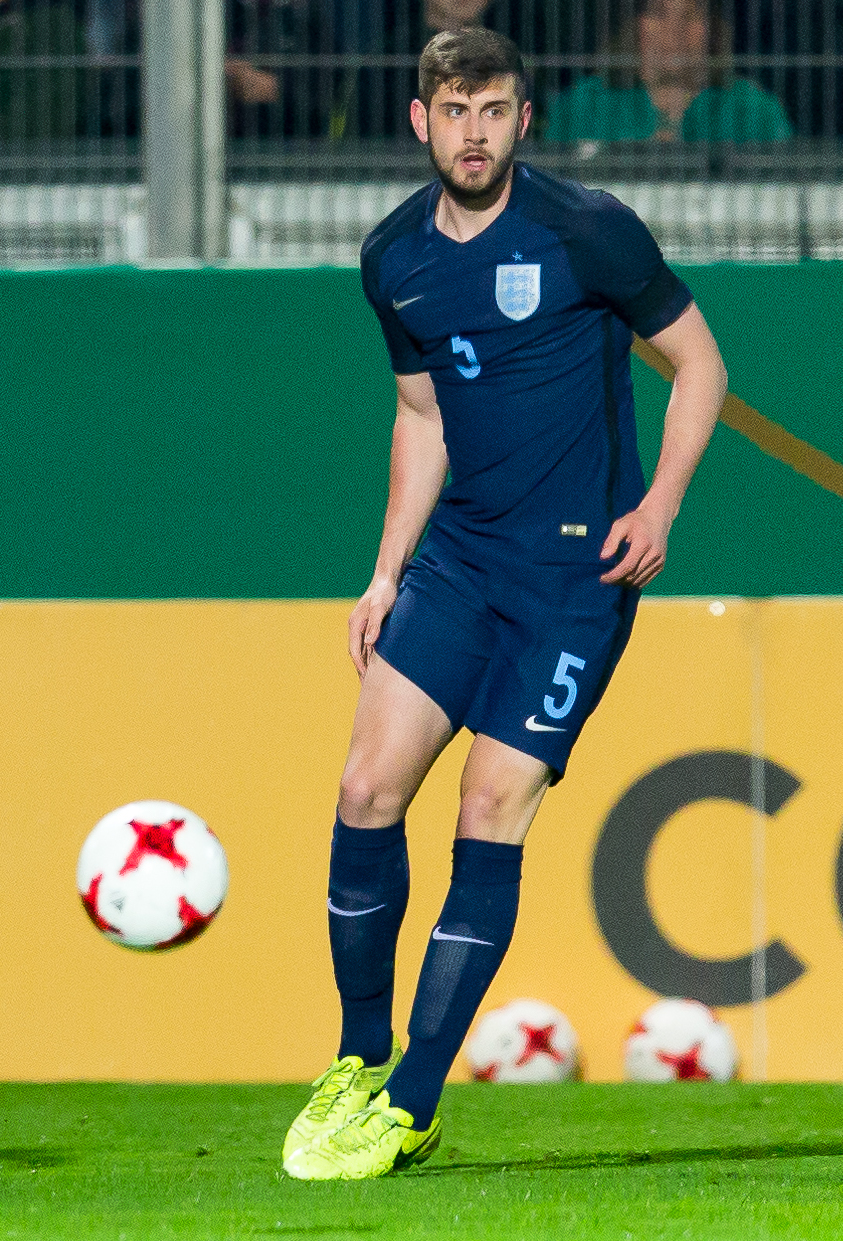
Stephens playing for England U21 in 2017

Stephens received his first call-up for the England under-18 side for a match against Poland in March 2012, playing the first half of a 3–0 win at Crewe Alexandra's home ground Alexandra Stadium. Later in the year he made the step up to the under-19 team, making his debut on 26 September, in a 3–0 win over Estonia in the qualifying stages of the 2013 European Championships, playing the full 90 minutes. He later played 45 minutes of a 6–0 win over the Faroe Islands on 28 September (after which he was replaced by fellow Southampton player Calum Chambers, who scored the sixth goal), the full 90 minutes of a 1–1 draw with Ukraine on 1 October, and the first half of a 1–0 friendly win over Finland on 13 November, which also featured Southampton midfielder James Ward-Prowse. Stephens made his debut for the England under-21 side on 12 November 2015, in a 0–0 draw against Bosnia and Herzegovina, but was sent off in the 72nd minute.

He was part of the team that won the 2016 Toulon Tournament, their first such win for 22 years.

== Career statistics ==
As of match played 21 November 2026

Appearances and goals by club, season and competition
Club	Season	League			FA Cup		League Cup		Other		Total	
Club	Season	Division	Apps	Goals	Apps	Goals	Apps	Goals	Apps	Goals	Apps	Goals
Plymouth Argyle	2010–11	League One	5	0	0	0	0	0	1 (Note: Appearances in Football League Trophy)	0	6	0
Plymouth Argyle	Total		5	0	0	0	0	0	1	0	6	0
Southampton	2011–12	Championship	0	0	1	0	0	0	—		1	0
Southampton	2012–13	Premier League	0	0	0	0	0	0	—		0	0
Southampton	2016–17	Premier League	17	0	3	0	3	0	0	0	23	0
Southampton	2017–18	Premier League	22	2	4	1	1	0	—		27	3
Southampton	2018–19	Premier League	24	1	2	0	3	0	—		29	1
Southampton	2019–20	Premier League	28	1	2	0	1	1	—		31	2
Southampton	2020–21	Premier League	18	0	3	0	1	0	—		22	0
Southampton	2021–22	Premier League	11	0	4	0	1	0	—		16	0
Southampton	2022–23	Premier League	2	0	0	0	0	0	—		2	0
Southampton	2023–24	Championship	23	0	4	0	0	0	3 (Note: Appearances in Championship play-offs)	0	30	0
Southampton	2024–25	Premier League	19	1	0	0	0	0	—		19	1
Southampton	2025–26	Championship	32	2	0	0	0	0	0	0	32	2
Southampton	2026–27	Championship	12	0	0	0	2	0	—		14	0
Southampton	Total		208	7	23	1	12	1	3	0	246	9
Swindon Town (loan)	2013–14	League One	10	0	0	0	0	0	0	0	10	0
Swindon Town (loan)	2014–15	League One	37	1	1	0	0	0	4 (Note: One appearance in Football League Trophy, three appearances in League One play-offs)	0	42	1
Middlesbrough (loan)	2015–16	Championship	1	0	0	0	4	0	—		5	0
Coventry City (loan)	2015–16	League One	16	0	0	0	0	0	0	0	16	0
Bournemouth (loan)	2022–23	Premier League	15	0	1	0	1	0	—		17	0
Career total			292	8	25	1	17	1	8	0	342	10

== Honours ==
Southampton

- EFL Cup runner-up: 2016–17
- EFL Championship play-offs: 2024

England U21

- Toulon Tournament: 2016
