= Sufianu Sillah Dibaga =

Spanish footballer (born 2007)

Personal information
- Full name: Sufianu Sillah Dibaga
- Date of birth: 18 March 2007 (age 19)
- Position: Forward

Team information
- Current team: Southampton
- Number: 57

Youth career
- –2023: Crystal Palace
- 2023–: Southampton

Senior career*
Years	Team	Apps	(Gls)
2026–	Southampton	0	(0)
- * Club domestic league appearances and goals as of 19:37, 14 February 2026 (UTC)

Sufianu Sillah Dibaga (born 18 March 2007) is a Spanish professional footballer who plays as a forward for EFL Championship club Southampton.

== Career ==
On 4 July 2023, Sillah Dibaga joined Southampton from Crystal Palace on a scholarship deal. On 30 July 2025, he signed his first professional contract with Southampton. He made his first appearance for the club on 14 February 2026 in a 2–1 victory against Leicester City in the FA Cup after he replaced Samuel Edozie in the 63rd minute. On 23 February, Sillah Dibaga signed a two-year contract extension.

== Career statistics ==
As of match played 14 February 2026

Appearances and goals by club, season and competition
Club	Season	League			National cup (Note: Includes FA Cup)		League cup (Note: Includes EFL Cup)		Other		Total	
Club	Season	Division	Apps	Goals	Apps	Goals	Apps	Goals	Apps	Goals	Apps	Goals
Southampton	2025–26	Championship	0	0	1	0	0	0	0	0	1	0
Southampton	2026–27	Championship	0	0	0	0	0	0	—		0	0
Career total			0	0	1	0	0	0	0	0	1	0
