= Barnaby Williams =

English footballer (born 2006)

Personal information
- Full name: Barnaby Joe Williams
- Date of birth: 12 November 2006 (age 19)
- Position: Midfielder

Team information
- Current team: Southampton
- Number: 53

Youth career
- Southampton

Senior career*
Years	Team	Apps	(Gls)
2025–	Southampton	2	(0)
- * Club domestic league appearances and goals as of 18:10, 31 October 2026 (UTC)

Barnaby Joe Williams (born 12 November 2006) is an English professional footballer who plays as a midfielder for EFL Championship club Southampton.

== Career ==
On 4 January 2024, Williams signed his first professional contract with Southampton, six months after signing a scholarship deal. In July 2025, he signed a two-year contract extension. Following a car crash at the beginning of the 2024–25 season that caused him to miss months of football, Williams made his senior debut for the club on 8 November 2025 in a 3–1 victory against Sheffield Wednesday after he replaced Flynn Downes at half-time. On 16 March 2026, he signed a three-year contract extension.

== Career statistics ==
As of match played 31 October 2026

Appearances and goals by club, season and competition
Club	Season	League			National Cup		League Cup		Other		Total	
Club	Season	Division	Apps	Goals	Apps	Goals	Apps	Goals	Apps	Goals	Apps	Goals
Southampton	2025–26	Championship	1	0	1	0	0	0	0	0	2	0
Southampton	2026–27	Championship	1	0	0	0	0	0	—		1	0
Career total			2	0	1	0	0	0	0	0	3	0
