= Romeo Akachukwu =

Irish footballer (born 2006)

Personal information
- Date of birth: 28 May 2006 (age 20)
- Height: 5 ft 10 in (1.78 m)
- Position: Midfielder

Team information
- Current team: Southampton
- Number: 29

Youth career
- –2022: Waterford

Senior career*
Years	Team	Apps	(Gls)
2022–2024	Waterford	25	(0)
2024–	Southampton	1	(0)
2026	→ Colchester United (loan)	15	(0)

International career^{‡}
2022	Republic of Ireland U16	2	(0)
2022–2023	Republic of Ireland U17	14	(3)
2023–2025	Republic of Ireland U19	21	(0)
2025–	Republic of Ireland U21	6	(0)
- * Club domestic league appearances and goals as of 17:05, 22 August 2026 (UTC) ‡ National team caps and goals as of 00:02, 18 November 2026 (UTC)

Romeo Akachukwu (born 28 May 2006) is an Irish professional footballer who plays as a midfielder for EFL Championship club Southampton.

== Club career ==
=== Waterford ===
Akachukwu played for Ferrybank prior to joining Waterford. His performances for Waterford included a first senior hat-trick in the 2023 League of Ireland First Division play-off semi-final against Athlone Town.

=== Southampton ===
He agreed to join Southampton from Waterford in 2024, for a reported initial fee of €375,000, with another €125,000 in potential add-ons. He was included in Southampton's match-day squad for the EFL Cup tie against Cardiff City on 28 August 2024, making his debut as a second-half substitute.

On 2 February 2026, Akachukwu joined Colchester United on loan for the remainder of the 2025–26 season. He made his debut for the club on 7 February in a 2–0 victory against Shrewsbury Town after he replaced Arthur Read in the 74th minute.

On 8 August 2026, Akachukwu scored his first goal for Southampton in a 2–0 away victory against his former loan club Colchester United in the EFL Cup.

== International career ==
Born in Ireland, Akachukwu is of Nigerian descent and holds dual citizenship. He played for the Republic of Ireland national under-17 football team at the 2023 European U17 Championships. After making 21 appearances for the Republic of Ireland U19s, on 28 August 2025, he received his first call up to the Republic of Ireland U21 squad.

== Career statistics ==
As of match played 25 August 2026

Appearances and goals by club, season and competition
Club	Season	League			National Cup (Note: Includes FAI Cup & FA Cup)		League Cup (Note: Includes EFL Cup)		Other		Total	
Club	Season	Division	Apps	Goals	Apps	Goals	Apps	Goals	Apps	Goals	Apps	Goals
Waterford	2022	League of Ireland First Division	2	0	1	0	—		0	0	3	0
Waterford	2023	League of Ireland First Division	16	0	1	1	—		4 (Note: Appearances in the 2023 League of Ireland First Division Promotion Playoffs)	3	21	4
Waterford	2024	League of Ireland Premier Division	7	0	0	0	—		—		7	0
Waterford	Total		25	0	2	1	—		4	3	31	4
Southampton	2024–25	Premier League	0	0	0	0	1	0	—		1	0
Southampton	2025–26	Championship	0	0	0	0	0	0	—		0	0
Southampton	2026–27	Championship	1	0	0	0	2	1	—		3	1
Southampton	Total		1	0	0	0	3	1	—		4	1
Colchester United (loan)	2025–26	League Two	15	0	—		—		—		15	0
Career total			41	0	2	1	3	1	4	3	50	5
