= Cameron Archer =

English footballer (born 2001)

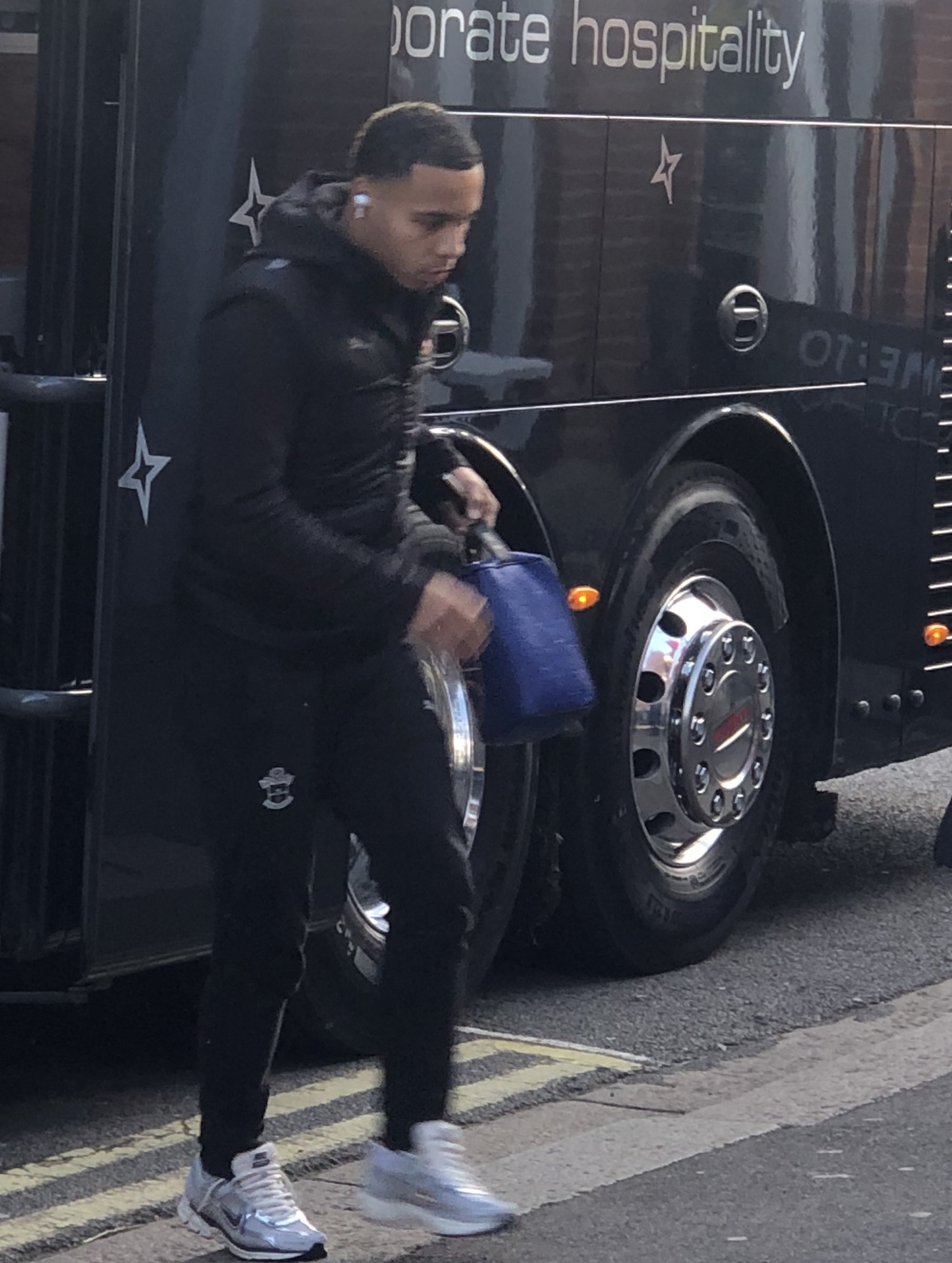
- Cameron Archer in 2024

Personal information
- Full name: Cameron Desmond Archer
- Date of birth: 9 December 2001 (age 24)
- Place of birth: Walsall, England
- Height: 1.81 m (5 ft 11 in)
- Positions: Forward; left winger

Team information
- Current team: Auxerre (on loan from Southampton)
- Number: 9

Youth career
- Walsall
- –2020: Aston Villa

Senior career*
Years	Team	Apps	(Gls)
2019–2023	Aston Villa	10	(0)
2020–2021	→ Solihull Moors (loan)	26	(4)
2022	→ Preston North End (loan)	20	(7)
2023	→ Middlesbrough (loan)	20	(11)
2023–2024	Sheffield United	29	(4)
2024	Aston Villa	0	(0)
2024–	Southampton	65	(6)
2026–	→ Auxerre (loan)	9	(6)

International career
2021–2022	England U20	2	(0)
2022–2023	England U21	11	(6)
Medal record
Representing England
UEFA European Under-21 Championship
Winner	2023 Georgia–Romania
- * Club domestic league appearances and goals as of 06:18, 22 November 2026 (UTC)

Cameron Desmond Archer (born 9 December 2001) is an English professional footballer who plays as a forward or left winger for Ligue 1 club Auxerre, on loan from EFL Championship club Southampton.

Archer is a product of the Aston Villa Academy. He joined Aston Villa aged eight from local side Walsall and progressed through all age groups to the first team, making his senior debut in August 2019. Archer has had loan spells at Solihull Moors, Preston North End, and Middlesbrough; and also permanently signed for Sheffield United for one season before returning to Aston Villa after United's relegation from the Premier League. He then joined Southampton before the subsequent season started.

Internationally, Archer has represented England at both U20 and U21 levels, winning the 2023 UEFA European Under-21 Championship with the latter.

== Club career ==
Living nearby in Walsall, Archer started training with Aston Villa at the age of eight after a spell with Walsall, and progressed through their academy sides, regularly playing in higher year groups for his age. He broke into the U23 side at the age of 16 and has been a regular ever since.

=== Aston Villa ===
Archer came off the bench to make his senior debut for Villa at the age of 17 years 262 days in an EFL Cup tie against Crewe Alexandra on 27 August 2019. Villa were an invited side for 2019–20 EFL Trophy, fielding an under-21 side in the competition, Archer started in both of Villa's group matches against Salford City and Tranmere Rovers, scoring from 18-yards early in the game against Tranmere in a 2–1 defeat.

On 2 October 2020, Archer signed for Solihull Moors in the National League on loan until January 2021. He made his debut from the subs bench the following day, in a 2–1 away defeat to Woking. On 10 October 2020, Archer got his first two goals in senior league football in a 5–0 victory over King's Lynn Town. On 4 January 2021, the loan was extended until the end of the season with no option to recall.

On 24 August 2021, Archer scored a hat-trick, his first senior goals for the club, in his first senior start, a 6–0 victory against Barrow in the second round of the EFL Cup. On 22 September, Archer scored against Chelsea in the third round of the EFL Cup in a 1–1 draw that Chelsea won on penalties 4–3. Three days later, Archer made his Premier League debut, coming on as an 86th-minute substitute in a 1–0 victory over Manchester United at Old Trafford.

On 24 January 2022, Archer joined Preston North End on loan until the end of the season. Two days later, on 26 January, Archer scored on his debut in the Championship, a 2–0 away victory at West Bromwich Albion.

In the build-up to the 2022–23 season, there was much debate about Archer's future, with a number of Championship teams linked with loan moves for the player. On 1 August 2022, Aston Villa manager Steven Gerrard announced that after impressing on a pre-season tour of Australia, Archer would remain with the club and be a part of the Premier League squad. On 5 August, Archer signed a new five-year contract with The Villans.

Having found first-team opportunities to be limited, Archer joined Championship club Middlesbrough on loan until the end of the season on 6 January 2023. Archer made his Middlesbrough debut the following day, as a substitute in a 5–1 FA Cup defeat to Premier League Brighton & Hove Albion.

=== Sheffield United ===
On 27 August 2023, Sheffield United announced the signing of Archer on a four-year deal, after reaching an agreement with Aston Villa on an undisclosed transfer fee, which was reported to be £18m. Press reports noted that Aston Villa insisted that the transfer included a buy-back clause.

On 2 September 2023, Archer made his full debut for the club scoring the equaliser in 2–2 draw against Everton.

=== Return to Aston Villa ===
Following the confirmation of Sheffield United's relegation in May 2024, Aston Villa manager Unai Emery confirmed that Archer would be re-signing with Villa once the transfer window opened in June 2024. In July 2024, Archer returned to pre-season training with Aston Villa.

=== Southampton ===
On 16 August 2024, Archer joined Premier League side Southampton on a four-year contract for an undisclosed fee, reported to be £15 million, plus add-ons. He made his debut for the club on 17 August 2024 in a 1–0 away defeat against Newcastle United after he replaced Ben Brereton Díaz in the 71st minute. On 28 August 2024, Archer scored a brace in a 5–3 away victory against Cardiff City in the EFL Cup.

On 1 September 2026, Archer joined French side Auxerre on a season-long loan.

== International career ==
Born in England, Archer is eligible to represent the England national football team, as well as Jamaica, through his mother. On 11 November 2021, Archer made his debut for England under-20s, in a 2–0 defeat to Portugal.

On 25 May 2022, Archer received his first call up to the England U21 squad ahead of the final round of 2023 UEFA European Under-21 Championship qualification matches. He made his debut as a 68th-minute substitute during a 2–1 victory away to Czech Republic on 3 June 2022. On 7 June 2022, Archer scored his first goal for the England U21s in a 3–0 2023 UEFA European Under-21 Championship qualification win against Albania.

On 14 June 2023, Archer was included in the England squad for the 2023 UEFA European Under-21 Championship. He scored in a group stage match against Germany and also recorded the last goal of the semi-final victory over Israel. Archer came off the bench as a late substitute in the final as England defeated Spain to win the tournament.

== Personal life ==
Archer is the younger brother of Jordan McFarlane-Archer, a former professional footballer. Archer is known as 'Cam' and attended Christ Church CE Primary and Walsall Academy secondary school.

== Career statistics ==
As of match played 21 November 2026

Appearances and goals by club, season and competition
Club	Season	League			FA Cup		EFL Cup		Other		Total	
Club	Season	Division	Apps	Goals	Apps	Goals	Apps	Goals	Apps	Goals	Apps	Goals
Aston Villa U-21s	2019–20	—			—		—		2 (Note: Appearances in EFL Trophy)	1	2	1
Aston Villa U-21s	2020–21	—			—		—		3	6	3	6
Aston Villa U-21s	2021–22	—			—		—		3	6	3	6
Aston Villa U-21s	Total		—		—		—		6	7	6	7
Aston Villa	2019–20	Premier League	0	0	0	0	1	0	—		1	0
Aston Villa	2020–21	Premier League	0	0	0	0	0	0	—		0	0
Aston Villa	2021–22	Premier League	3	0	0	0	2	4	—		5	4
Aston Villa	2022–23	Premier League	6	0	0	0	1	0	—		7	0
Aston Villa	2023–24	Premier League	1	0	0	0	0	0	—		1	0
Aston Villa	Total		10	0	0	0	4	4	—		14	4
Solihull Moors (loan)	2020–21	National League	26	4	2	1	—		1 (Note: Appearance in FA Trophy)	1	29	6
Preston North End (loan)	2021–22	Championship	20	7	0	0	—		—		20	7
Middlesbrough (loan)	2022–23	Championship	20	11	1	0	—		1 (Note: Appearance in Championship play-offs)	0	22	11
Sheffield United	2023–24	Premier League	29	4	2	0	1	0	—		32	4
Aston Villa	2024–25	Premier League	0	0	0	0	0	0	—		0	0
Southampton	2024–25	Premier League	35	2	2	0	3	3	—		40	5
Southampton	2025–26	Championship	30	4	3	1	3	1	0	0	36	6
Southampton	2026–27	Championship	0	0	0	0	1	0	—		1	0
Southampton	Total		65	6	5	1	7	4	0	0	77	11
Auxerre (loan)	2026–27	Ligue 1	9	6	0	0	—		—		9	6
Career total			179	42	10	2	12	8	8	8	209	56

== Honours ==
England U21

- UEFA European Under-21 Championship: 2023

Individual

- EFL Trophy Player of the Round (Round 1): 2021–22
- EFL Trophy Top Goalscorer: 2021–22
