= Léo Scienza =

Brazilian footballer (born 1998)

- Scienza with Southampton in 2025

Personal information
- Full name: Leonardo Weschenfelder Scienza
- Date of birth: 13 September 1998 (age 28)
- Place of birth: Venâncio Aires, Brazil
- Height: 1.75 m (5 ft 9 in)
- Positions: Winger; attacking midfielder

Team information
- Current team: Southampton
- Number: 7

Youth career
- 2014: Avenida
- 2015: Chapecoense
- 2016: Lajeadense
- 2017: Defensor Sporting

Senior career*
| Years | Team | Apps | (Gls) |
| 2018 | Lajeadense | 2 | (0) |
| 2019–2020 | Fanna | 21 | (12) |
| 2020–2022 | Schalke 04 II | 59 | (15) |
| 2022–2023 | 1. FC Magdeburg | 11 | (0) |
| 2023 | 1. FC Magdeburg II | 10 | (13) |
| 2023–2024 | SSV Ulm | 34 | (12) |
| 2024–2025 | 1. FC Heidenheim | 27 | (4) |
| 2025– | Southampton | 50 | (9) |
- * Club domestic league appearances and goals as of 17:46, 7 November 2026 (UTC)

Leonardo Weschenfelder Scienza (born 13 September 1998), better known as Léo Scienza, is a Brazilian professional footballer who plays as winger or attacking midfielder for EFL Championship club Southampton.

He began his professional career with Lajeadense in 2018 before joining Swedish fifth-tier club Fanna BK in 2019. Scienza moved to Germany, where he had spells with Schalke 04 II, 1. FC Magdeburg and SSV Ulm before joining 1. FC Heidenheim in July 2024. Scienza moved to Southampton in September 2025.

== Career ==
=== Early career ===
Born in Venâncio Aires, Scienza had spells with the youth teams of Avenida, Chapecoense and Defensor Sporting, before beginning his senior career with Lajeadense.

Aged 20, Scienza moved to Sweden, having been promised trials with professional clubs by his agent. This did not materialise, and he instead signed for Swedish fifth tier side Fanna BK ahead of the 2019 season. He helped Fanna win promotion to the fourth tier in his only full season at the club, registering 10 goals and 22 assists in 18 league games.

=== Schalke 04 II ===
On 16 September 2020, Scienza signed for Schalke 04 II in the German fourth tier. He spent two seasons at the club, scoring 15 goals in 59 appearances in the Regionalliga West, as well as playing once in a friendly for Schalke's first team.

=== 1. FC Magdeburg ===
In 2022, he signed for 2. Bundesliga club 1. FC Magdeburg. On 16 July 2022, Scienza debuted for Magdeburg during a 2–1 loss to Fortuna Düsseldorf.

=== SSV Ulm ===
On 5 July 2023, Scienza moved to 3. Liga side SSV Ulm. In the 2023–24 season, he finished as the club's top scorer with 12 goals and won the 3. Liga Player of the Season award, as Ulm won the league title.

=== 1. FC Heidenheim ===
On 23 May 2024, Scienza signed a three-year contract with Bundesliga club 1. FC Heidenheim, beginning in July 2024. On 22 August, he scored his first goal for the club in a 2–1 away win over BK Häcken in the UEFA Conference League qualifying phase. On 1 September, Scienza netted his first Bundesliga goal in a 4–0 victory over Augsburg. On 26 May 2025, he scored a stoppage-time winner in a 2–1 away victory against Elversberg in the second leg of the relegation play-offs, ensuring his club's survival in the top flight.

=== Southampton ===
On 1 September 2025, Scienza joined Southampton on a four-year contract. He made his debut for the club on 14 September in a 0–0 draw with Portsmouth. On 25 October, Scienza scored his first goal for the club in a 2–1 away defeat against Blackburn Rovers. After contributing seven goals and ten assists in 37 league appearances during the 2025–26 season, he was named both the Fan's and Players' Player of the Season.

== International career ==
Scienza, of Luxembourgish descent, holds a Luxembourg passport, yet he is not eligible to represent Luxembourg internationally, having not lived in Luxembourg for five years.

== Career statistics ==
As of match played on 7 November 2026

Appearances and goals by club, season and competition
| Club | Season | League | | | State league | | National cup | | League cup | | Continental | | Other | | Total | |
| Club | Season | Division | Apps | Goals | Apps | Goals | Apps | Goals | Apps | Goals | Apps | Goals | Apps | Goals | Apps | Goals |
|---|---|---|---|---|---|---|---|---|---|---|---|---|---|---|---|---|
| Lajeadense | 2018 | Campeonato Gaúcho | — | | 2 | 0 | — | | — | | — | | — | | 2 | 0 |
| Fanna | 2019 | Division 3 | 18 | 10 | — | | 0 | 0 | — | | — | | — | | 18 | 10 |
| Fanna | 2020 | Division 2 | 3 | 2 | — | | 0 | 0 | — | | — | | — | | 3 | 2 |
| Fanna | Total | | 21 | 12 | — | | 0 | 0 | — | | — | | — | | 21 | 12 |
| Schalke 04 II | 2020–21 | Regionalliga West | 23 | 4 | — | | — | | — | | — | | — | | 23 | 4 |
| Schalke 04 II | 2021–22 | Regionalliga West | 36 | 11 | — | | — | | — | | — | | — | | 36 | 11 |
| Schalke 04 II | Total | | 59 | 15 | — | | — | | — | | — | | — | | 59 | 15 |
| 1. FC Magdeburg | 2022–23 | 2. Bundesliga | 11 | 0 | — | | 1 | 0 | — | | — | | — | | 12 | 0 |
| 1. FC Magdeburg II | 2022–23 | Verbandsliga Sachsen-Anhalt | 10 | 13 | — | | — | | — | | — | | — | | 10 | 13 |
| SSV Ulm | 2023–24 | 3. Liga | 34 | 12 | — | | 0 | 0 | — | | — | | — | | 34 | 12 |
| 1. FC Heidenheim | 2024–25 | Bundesliga | 25 | 3 | — | | 2 | 0 | — | | 8 (Note: Appearances in UEFA Conference League) | 2 | 2 (Note: Appearances in Bundesliga promotion/relegation playoffs) | 1 | 37 | 6 |
| 1. FC Heidenheim | 2025–26 | Bundesliga | 2 | 1 | — | | 1 | 2 | — | | — | | — | | 3 | 3 |
| 1. FC Heidenheim | Total | | 27 | 4 | — | | 3 | 2 | — | | 8 | 2 | 2 | 1 | 40 | 9 |
| Southampton | 2025–26 | Championship | 37 | 7 | — | | 4 | 0 | 1 | 0 | — | | 2 (Note: Appearance(s) in Championship play-offs) | 0 | 44 | 7 |
| Southampton | 2026–27 | Championship | 13 | 2 | — | | 0 | 0 | 2 | 1 | — | | — | | 15 | 3 |
| Southampton | Total | | 50 | 9 | — | | 4 | 0 | 3 | 1 | — | | 2 | 0 | 59 | 10 |
| Career total | | | 212 | 65 | 2 | 0 | 8 | 2 | 3 | 1 | 8 | 2 | 4 | 1 | 237 | 71 |
