= Jay Robinson (footballer) =

English footballer (born 2007)

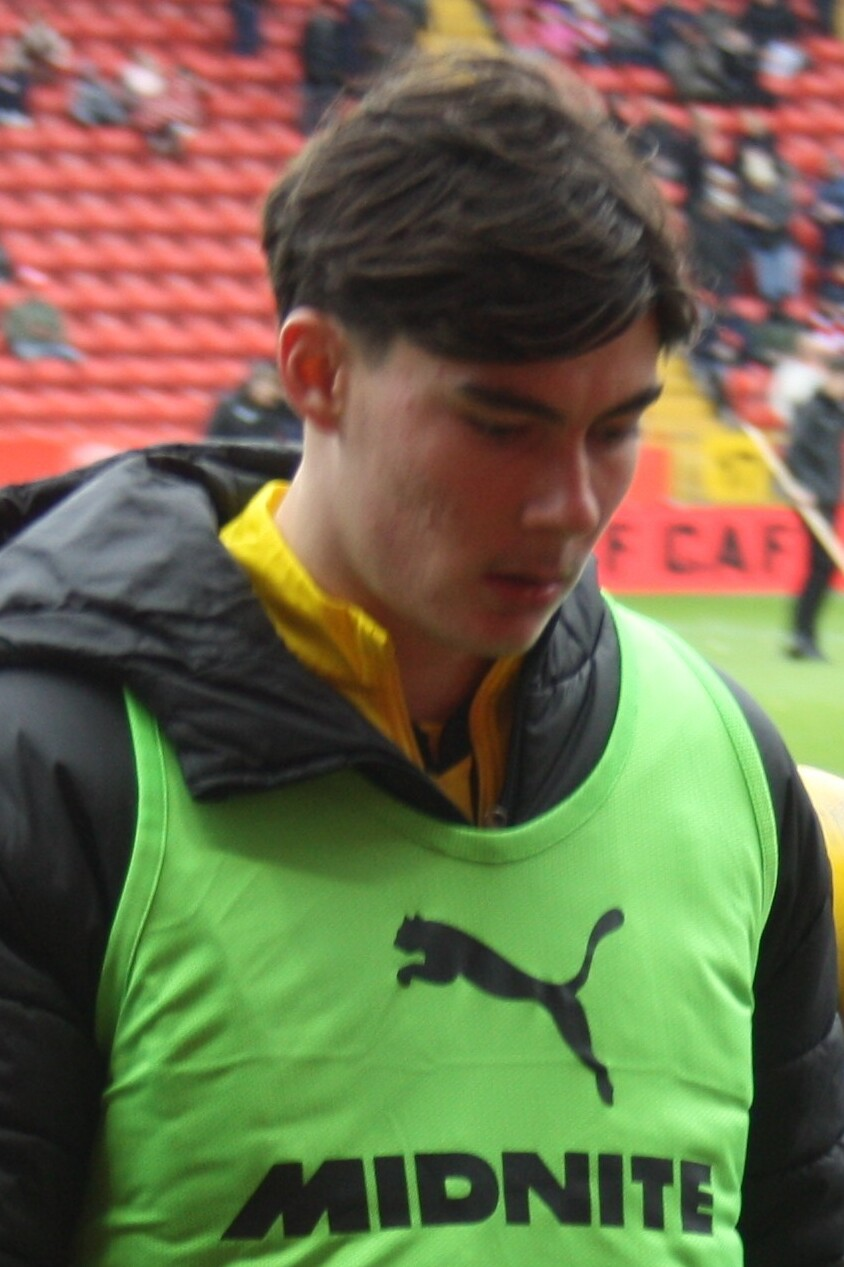
- Robinson with Southampton in 2025

Personal information
- Full name: Jay Steven Robinson
- Date of birth: 15 March 2007 (age 19)
- Place of birth: Hounslow, England
- Height: 5 ft 9 in (1.76 m)
- Positions: Winger; attacking midfielder

Team information
- Current team: Monza (on loan from Southampton)
- Number: 46

Youth career
- 2019–2025: Southampton

Senior career*
| Years | Team | Apps | (Gls) |
| 2025– | Southampton | 27 | (2) |
| 2026– | → Monza (loan) | 9 | (2) |

International career^{‡}
| 2022–2023 | England U16 | 5 | (1) |
| 2023–2024 | England U17 | 10 | (1) |
| 2025 | England U18 | 1 | (0) |
| 2025– | England U19 | 5 | (0) |
- * Club domestic league appearances and goals as of 06:07, 9 November 2026 (UTC) ‡ National team caps and goals as of 10:07, 16 October 2025 (UTC)

Jay Steven Robinson (born 15 March 2007) is an English professional footballer who plays as a winger or attacking midfielder for Serie A club Monza, on loan from EFL Championship club Southampton.

== Club career ==
On 19 July 2024, Robinson signed his first professional contract with Southampton. In April 2025, Southampton U21 manager Calum MacFarlane revealed Robinson was a permanent fixture in first team training. He made his first appearance for the club in a 3–0 home defeat against Aston Villa on 12 April after he replaced Mateus Fernandes in the 89th minute, and became Southampton's 11th youngest player in the Premier League. On 17 April, Robinson signed a new four-year contract.

On 17 August 2025, he scored his first professional goal in a 1–1 draw with Ipswich Town. In February 2026, manager Tonda Eckert revealed Robinson had been suffering from a quad injury. The injury took longer than expected to heal, with Robinson stating that he had endured "ups and downs" during his first full season as a senior player. On 14 April 2026, he returned from injury in a 3–0 victory against Blackburn Rovers.

On 7 August 2026, Robinson joined Serie A club Monza on a season-long loan. He made his debut for the club on 22 August in a 4–1 defeat against Inter Milan after he replaced Gustavo Varela in the 83rd minute. On 6 September, Robinson scored his first goal for the club in a 1–1 draw against Parma.

== International career ==
Robinson has represented England at youth level and in March 2024 played in qualifiers for England U17 against Northern Ireland and France.

Robinson made his U19 debut as a substitute during a 2–0 victory against Ukraine at Pinatar Arena on 3 September 2025.

== Career statistics ==
As of match played 8 November 2026

Appearances and goals by club, season and competition
| Club | Season | League | | | Domestic cup (Note: Includes FA Cup, Coppa Italia) | | League cup (Note: Includes EFL Cup) | | Other | | Total | |
| Club | Season | Division | Apps | Goals | Apps | Goals | Apps | Goals | Apps | Goals | Apps | Goals |
|---|---|---|---|---|---|---|---|---|---|---|---|---|
| Southampton | 2024–25 | Premier League | 4 | 0 | 0 | 0 | 0 | 0 | — | | 4 | 0 |
| Southampton | 2025–26 | Championship | 23 | 2 | 1 | 0 | 0 | 0 | 0 | 0 | 24 | 2 |
| Southampton | 2026–27 | Championship | — | | — | | — | | — | | 0 | 0 |
| Southampton | Total | | 27 | 2 | 1 | 0 | 0 | 0 | 0 | 0 | 28 | 2 |
| Monza (loan) | 2026–27 | Serie A | 9 | 2 | 1 | 0 | — | | — | | 10 | 2 |
| Career total | | | 36 | 4 | 2 | 0 | 0 | 0 | 0 | 0 | 38 | 4 |
