= Joshua Quarshie =

German footballer (born 2004)

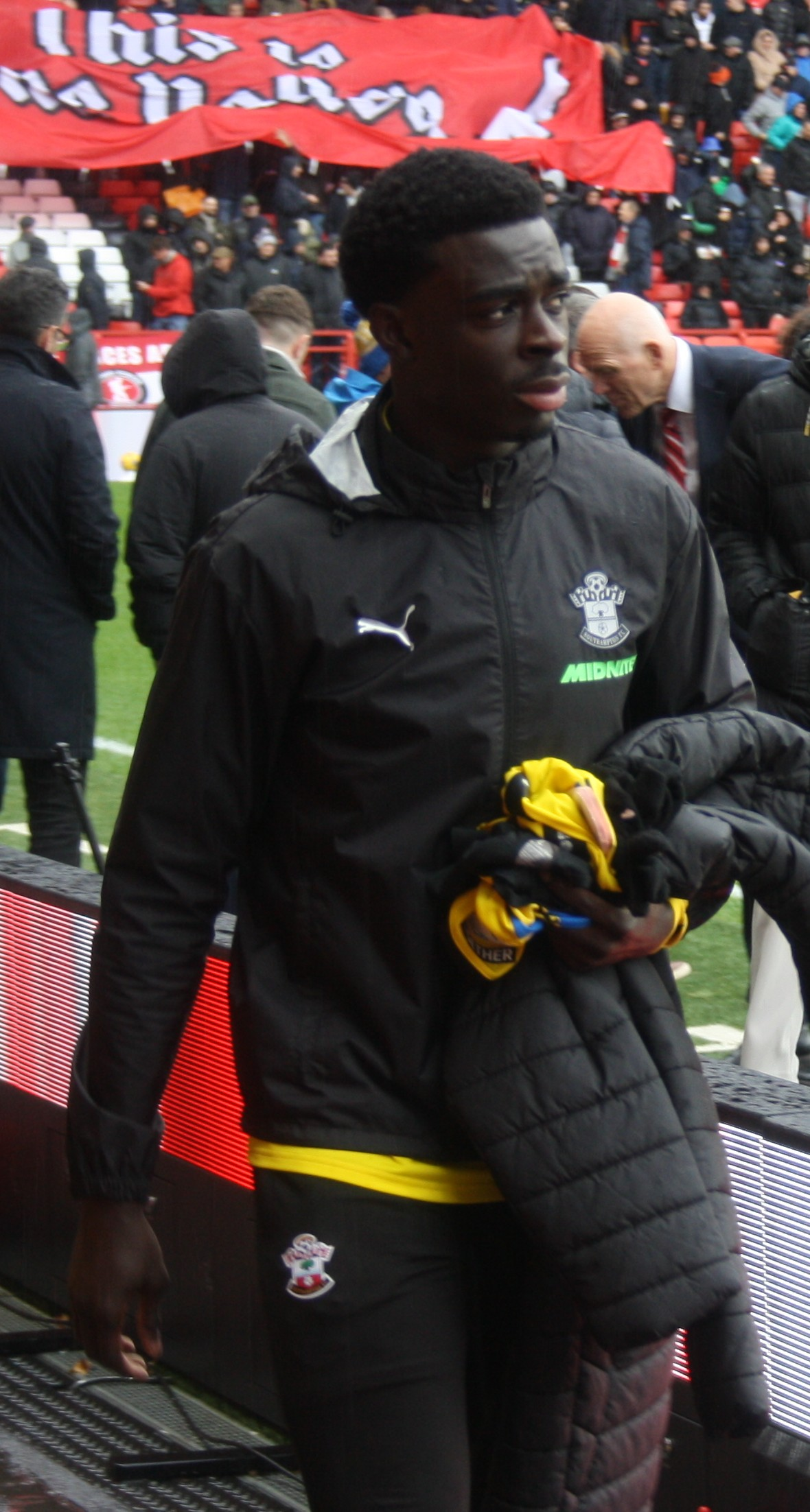
- Quarshie with Southampton in 2025

Personal information
- Date of birth: 26 July 2004 (age 22)
- Place of birth: Duisburg, Germany
- Height: 1.96 m (6 ft 5 in)
- Position: Centre-back

Team information
- Current team: Sturm Graz (on loan from Southampton)
- Number: 2

Youth career
- 2017–2019: Schalke 04
- 2019–2020: Fortuna Düsseldorf
- 2020–2022: Rot-Weiss Essen

Senior career*
| Years | Team | Apps | (Gls) |
| 2022–2025 | TSG Hoffenheim II | 45 | (2) |
| 2022–2025 | TSG 1899 Hoffenheim | 1 | (0) |
| 2024–2025 | → Fortuna Düsseldorf (loan) | 13 | (0) |
| 2024–2025 | → Fortuna Düsseldorf II (loan) | 5 | (0) |
| 2025 | → Greuther Fürth (loan) | 15 | (0) |
| 2025– | Southampton | 13 | (0) |
| 2026– | → Sturm Graz (loan) | 8 | (0) |

International career^{‡}
| 2021–2022 | Germany U18 | 5 | (0) |
| 2022–2023 | Germany U19 | 6 | (0) |
| 2023–2024 | Germany U20 | 9 | (0) |
| 2025– | Germany U21 | 11 | (0) |
- * Club domestic league appearances and goals as of 06:06, 9 November 2026 (UTC) ‡ National team caps and goals as of 20:35, 17 November 2026 (UTC)

Joshua Quarshie (born 26 July 2004) is a German professional footballer who plays as a centre-back for Austrian Bundesliga club Sturm Graz, on loan from EFL Championship club Southampton.

Quarshie began his professional career with TSG Hoffenheim. Initially playing for the reserves, he made his debut for the senior team in November 2022. Quarshie had loan spells with Fortuna Düsseldorf and Greuther Fürth. In 2025, he joined English club Southampton. He has represented his country at youth levels.

== Club career ==
=== Early career ===
Quarshie is a youth product of Schalke 04, Fortuna Düsseldorf and Rot-Weiss Essen.

=== TSG Hoffenheim ===
On 16 July 2022, he transferred to TSG Hoffenheim, where he was originally assigned to their reserves. He made his senior and professional debut as a late substitute in a 2–1 Bundesliga loss to Wolfsburg on 9 November 2022.

In August 2023, Quarshie was officially moved to TSG Hoffenheim's first squad.

On 29 January 2024, Quarshie returned to his former youth club Fortuna Düsseldorf on loan until 30 June 2025.

On 28 January 2025, Quarshie moved on a new loan to Greuther Fürth.

=== Southampton ===
On 30 May 2025, Southampton announced an agreement had been reached for Quarshie to join the club, and he would sign a four-year contract. He made his debut on 9 August in a 2–1 victory against Wrexham.

On 27 August 2026, Quarshie joined Austrian side Sturm Graz on a season-long loan.

== International career ==
Born in Germany, Quarshie is of Ghanaian descent. He is a youth international for Germany, having played up to the Germany U21s.

== Career statistics ==
As of match played 8 November 2026

Appearances and goals by club, season and competition
| Club | Season | League | | | National cup (Note: Includes DFB-Pokal, FA Cup, Austrian Cup) | | League cup (Note: Includes EFL Cup) | | Other | | Total | |
| Club | Season | Division | Apps | Goals | Apps | Goals | Apps | Goals | Apps | Goals | Apps | Goals |
|---|---|---|---|---|---|---|---|---|---|---|---|---|
| TSG Hoffenheim II | 2022–23 | Regionalliga Südwest | 27 | 1 | 0 | 0 | — | | — | | 27 | 1 |
| TSG Hoffenheim II | 2023–24 | Regionalliga Südwest | 18 | 1 | 0 | 0 | — | | — | | 18 | 1 |
| TSG Hoffenheim II | Total | | 45 | 2 | 0 | 0 | — | | — | | 45 | 2 |
| TSG 1899 Hoffenheim | 2022–23 | Bundesliga | 1 | 0 | 0 | 0 | — | | — | | 1 | 0 |
| TSG 1899 Hoffenheim | 2023–24 | Bundesliga | 0 | 0 | 0 | 0 | — | | — | | 0 | 0 |
| TSG 1899 Hoffenheim | Total | | 1 | 0 | 0 | 0 | — | | — | | 1 | 0 |
| Fortuna Düsseldorf (loan) | 2023–24 | 2. Bundesliga | 8 | 0 | 2 | 0 | — | | — | | 10 | 0 |
| Fortuna Düsseldorf (loan) | 2024–25 | 2. Bundesliga | 5 | 0 | 1 | 0 | — | | — | | 6 | 0 |
| Fortuna Düsseldorf (loan) | Total | | 13 | 0 | 3 | 0 | — | | — | | 16 | 0 |
| Fortuna Düsseldorf II (loan) | 2023–24 | Regionalliga West | 1 | 0 | 0 | 0 | — | | — | | 1 | 0 |
| Fortuna Düsseldorf II (loan) | 2024–25 | Regionalliga West | 4 | 0 | 0 | 0 | — | | — | | 4 | 0 |
| Fortuna Düsseldorf II (loan) | Total | | 5 | 0 | 0 | 0 | — | | — | | 5 | 0 |
| Greuther Fürth (loan) | 2024–25 | 2.Bundesliga | 15 | 0 | 0 | 0 | — | | — | | 15 | 0 |
| Southampton | 2025–26 | Championship | 13 | 0 | 3 | 0 | 2 | 0 | 0 | 0 | 18 | 0 |
| Southampton | 2026–27 | Championship | 0 | 0 | 0 | 0 | 0 | 0 | — | | 0 | 0 |
| Southampton | Total | | 13 | 0 | 3 | 0 | 2 | 0 | 0 | 0 | 18 | 0 |
| Sturm Graz (loan) | 2026–27 | Austrian Bundesliga | 8 | 0 | 2 | 0 | — | | 4 (Note: Appearances in UEFA Europa League) | 0 | 14 | 0 |
| Career total | | | 100 | 2 | 8 | 0 | 2 | 0 | 4 | 0 | 114 | 2 |
