= 2025–26 Southampton F.C. season =

English football club season

Southampton
2025–26 season
- Owner: Sport Republic
- Chairman: Dragan Šolak
- Head coach: Will Still (until 2 November); Tonda Eckert (from 2 November)
- Stadium: St Mary's Stadium
- Championship: 4th
- Championship play-offs: Expelled
- FA Cup: Semi-finals
- EFL Cup: Third round
- Top goalscorer: League: Adam Armstrong (11); All: Adam Armstrong; Finn Azaz; Ross Stewart (11)
- Highest home attendance: 31,206 v Derby County (11 April 2026)
- Lowest home attendance: 17,359 v Leicester City (14 February 2026)
- Average home league attendance: 28,532
Home colours	Away colours	Third colours

The 2025–26 season was the 109th season in the history of Southampton, and the club's first season back in the Championship since the 2023–24 campaign, following their relegation from the Premier League in the preceding season. In addition to the domestic league, the club also participated in the FA Cup and the EFL Cup.

== Managerial changes ==
Prior to the season starting, Will Still was appointed as the club's new manager on a three-year contract. On 2 November, Still was sacked as manager after sixteen games in charge and a win ratio of 25%, following which Tonda Eckert was appointed as interim head coach. On 5 December, Eckert was appointed as head coach, signing a contract until 2027.

== Players ==
N	Pos.	Nat.	Name	Age	Since	App	Goals	Ends	Transfer fee	Notes
1	GK	(England)	Alex McCarthy	36	2016	165	0	2026	Undisclosed	
2	DF	(Denmark)	Mads Roerslev	26	2025	10	0	2029	Undisclosed	
3	DF	(Republic of Ireland)	Ryan Manning	29	2023	119	8	2027	Free transfer	
4	MF	(England)	Flynn Downes	27	2024	109	6	2028	Undisclosed	
5	DF	(England)	Jack Stephens	32	2011	232	9	2028	Academy	Captain
6	DF	(England)	Taylor Harwood-Bellis	24	2024	132	12	2028	Undisclosed	
9	FW	(Canada)	Cyle Larin	31	2026	22	9	2026	Loan	
10	MF	(Republic of Ireland)	Finn Azaz	25	2025	47	11	2029	Undisclosed	
11	FW	(Scotland)	Ross Stewart	29	2023	50	12	2026	Undisclosed	
13	MF	(Brazil)	Léo Scienza	27	2025	44	7	2029	Undisclosed	
14	DF	(England)	James Bree	28	2023	74	5	2026	Undisclosed	
15	DF	(England)	Nathan Wood	23	2024	60	1	2028	Undisclosed	
17	DF	(Germany)	Joshua Quarshie	21	2025	18	0	2029	Undisclosed	
18	MF	(England)	Tom Fellows	22	2025	43	0	2029	Undisclosed	
19	FW	(England)	Cameron Archer	24	2024	76	11	2028	Undisclosed	
20	MF	(Germany)	Caspar Jander	23	2025	43	2	2029	Undisclosed	
23	MF	(England)	Samuel Edozie	23	2022	81	6	2027	Undisclosed	
24	MF	(Northern Ireland)	Shea Charles	22	2023	76	6	2027	Undisclosed	
25	GK	(England)	George Long	32	2025	1	0	2026	Loan	
27	MF	(Japan)	Kuryu Matsuki	23	2024	28	6	2028	Undisclosed	
28	MF	(Spain)	Oriol Romeu	34	2025	263	9	2026	Free transfer	
32	GK	(England)	Jamie Jones	37	2026	0	0	2026	Free transfer	
34	DF	(Brazil)	Welington	25	2025	32	0	TBA	Free transfer	
38	DF	(Denmark)	Elias Jelert	22	2025	11	0	2026	Loan	
41	GK	(Israel)	Daniel Peretz	25	2026	26	0	2026	Loan	
46	MF	(England)	Jay Robinson	19	2019	32	2	2029	Academy	
47	MF	(England)	Moses Sesay	19	2023	1	0	2028	Academy	
48	MF	(Scotland)	Cam Bragg	21	2013	24	1	2027	Academy	
49	FW	(England)	Nicholas Oyekunle	19	2013	4	0	2028	Academy	
53	MF	(England)	Barnaby Williams	19	2013	2	0	2029	Academy	
58	GK	(England)	Dylan Moody	18	2016	0	0	2028	Academy	

== Transfers ==
Players transferred in

Date	Pos.	Player	Club	Fee	Ref.
1 July 2025	DF	(Germany) Joshua Quarshie	(Germany) Hoffenheim	Undisclosed	
9 July 2025	FW	(United States) Damion Downs	(Germany) Köln	Undisclosed	
10 July 2025	MF	(England) Sutura Kakay	(England) Sheffield Wednesday	Undisclosed	
16 August 2025	DF	(Scotland) Rory Whittaker	(Scotland) Hibernian	Undisclosed	
21 August 2025	DF	(Denmark) Mads Roerslev	(England) Brentford	Undisclosed	
29 August 2025	MF	(Republic of Ireland) Finn Azaz	(England) Middlesbrough	Undisclosed	
29 August 2025	MF	(England) Tom Fellows	(England) West Bromwich Albion	Undisclosed	
29 August 2025	MF	(Germany) Caspar Jander	(Germany) FC Nürnberg	Undisclosed	
1 September 2025	GK	(England) Hugo Fisher	(England) Brighton & Hove Albion	Free transfer	
1 September 2025	MF	(Brazil) Léo Scienza	(Germany) Heidenheim	Undisclosed	
6 November 2025	MF	(Spain) Oriol Romeu	(Spain) Barcelona	Free transfer	
4 February 2026	FW	(England) Lewis Bailey	(England) Stoke City	Undisclosed	
11 February 2026	GK	(England) Jamie Jones	(England) Warrington Town	Free transfer	

Players loaned in

Date	Pos.	Player	Club	Duration	Ref.
25 August 2025	GK	(England) George Long	(England) Norwich City	End of season	
31 August 2025	DF	(Denmark) Elias Jelert	(Turkey) Galatasaray	End of season	
8 January 2026	GK	(Israel) Daniel Peretz	(Germany) Bayern Munich	End of season	
2 February 2026	FW	(Canada) Cyle Larin	(Spain) Mallorca	End of season	

Players transferred out

Date	Pos.	Player	Club	Fee	Ref.
1 July 2025	MF	(England) Sam Amo-Ameyaw	(France) Strasbourg	Undisclosed	
1 July 2025	GK	(United Arab Emirates) Adli Mohamed	(United Arab Emirates) Al-Nasr	Undisclosed	
1 July 2025	FW	(Nigeria) Paul Onuachu	(Turkey) Trabzonspor	Undisclosed	
2 July 2025	MF	(Ghana) Kamaldeen Sulemana	(Italy) Atalanta	Undisclosed	
28 July 2025	DF	(Poland) Jan Bednarek	(Portugal) Porto	Undisclosed	
25 August 2025	MF	(England) Tyler Dibling	(England) Everton	Undisclosed	
25 August 2025	FW	(Brazil) Juan	(Turkey) Göztepe	Undisclosed	
29 August 2025	MF	(Portugal) Mateus Fernandes	(England) West Ham United	Undisclosed	
1 September 2025	FW	(England) Dom Ballard	(England) Leyton Orient	Undisclosed	
1 September 2025	DF	(England) Cameron Frederick	(England) Oxford United	Undisclosed	
7 January 2026	DF	(England) Zach Awe	(England) Salford City	Undisclosed	
9 January 2026	DF	(England) Ronnie Edwards	(England) Queens Park Rangers	Undisclosed	
22 January 2026	MF	(Scotland) Ryan Fraser	(Australia) Western Sydney Wanderers	Undisclosed	
2 February 2026	FW	(England) Adam Armstrong	(England) Wolverhampton Wanderers	Undisclosed	
2 February 2026	DF	(Germany) Armel Bella-Kotchap	(Italy) Hellas Verona	Undisclosed	

Players loaned out

Date	Pos.	Player	Club	Duration	Ref.
4 July 2025	DF	(Spain) Juan Larios	(Spain) Cultural Leonesa	16 January 2026	
8 July 2025	GK	(England) Ollie Wright	(England) Accrington Stanley	End of season	
31 July 2025	DF	(England) Sonnie Davis	(England) Eastleigh	2 January 2026	
2 August 2025	GK	(England) Aaron Ramsdale	(England) Newcastle United	End of season	
6 August 2025	FW	(Japan) Rento Takaoka	(France) Valenciennes	9 April 2026	
11 August 2025	FW	(England) Princewill Ehibhatiomhan	(England) Swindon Town	5 January 2026	
14 August 2025	MF	(France) Daouda Traoré	(Spain) Real Betis	2 February 2026	
25 August 2025	DF	(France) Joachim Kayi Sanda	(France) Red Star	1 January 2026	
26 August 2025	DF	(Japan) Yukinari Sugawara	(Germany) Werder Bremen	End of season	
27 August 2025	DF	(Germany) Armel Bella-Kotchap	(Italy) Hellas Verona	2 February 2026	
31 August 2025	FW	(Chile) Ben Brereton Díaz	(England) Derby County	End of season	
1 September 2025	DF	(England) James Bree	(England) Charlton Athletic	18 January 2026	
1 September 2025	MF	(Republic of Ireland) Will Smallbone	(England) Millwall	End of season	
1 September 2025	DF	(England) Charlie Taylor	(England) West Bromwich Albion	End of season	
13 September 2025	DF	(England) Will Armitage	(England) Brackley Town	30 September 2025	
17 October 2025	DF	(England) Will Armitage	(England) Aldershot Town	31 December 2025	
17 October 2025	GK	(England) Josh Jeffries	(England) Worthing	31 December 2025	
3 January 2026	DF	(England) Sonnie Davis	(England) Chelmsford City	31 January 2026	
7 January 2026	FW	(United States) Damion Downs	(Germany) Hamburger SV	End of season	
13 January 2026	GK	(Republic of Ireland) Gavin Bazunu	(England) Stoke City	End of season	
16 January 2026	DF	(England) Will Armitage	(England) Eastbourne Borough	End of season	
2 February 2026	FW	(Republic of Ireland) Romeo Akachukwu	(England) Colchester United	End of season	
2 February 2026	MF	(Nigeria) Joe Aribo	(England) Leicester City	End of season	
2 February 2026	FW	(England) Princewill Ehibhatiomhan	(England) Salford City	End of season	
2 February 2026	DF	(Spain) Juan Larios	(Spain) Real Zaragoza	End of season	
2 February 2026	MF	(France) Daouda Traoré	(Italy) Bari	End of season	
23 March 2026	DF	(England) Jayden Moore	(England) Eastleigh	End of season	
27 March 2026	FW	(England) Will Merry	(England) Yeovil Town	End of season	

Players released

Date	Pos.	Player	Subsequent club	Join date	Ref.
30 June 2025	DF	(England) Derrick Abu	(France) Valenciennes	1 July 2025	
30 June 2025	GK	(England) Joe Lumley	(England) Bristol City	1 July 2025	
30 June 2025	DF	(England) Kyle Walker-Peters	(England) West Ham United	20 July 2025	
30 June 2025	GK	(Northern Ireland) Josh McNamara	(England) Eastleigh	2 August 2025	
30 June 2025	DF	(Grenada) Joshua Lett	(England) Sunderland	30 August 2025	
30 June 2025	DF	(England) Lewis Payne	(England) Morecambe	12 September 2025	
30 June 2025	MF	(England) Adam Lallana	None (retired)		
1 September 2025	DF	(England) Nico Lawrence	(England) York City	6 November 2025	
1 September 2025	MF	(England) Brook Myers	(Germany) OSC Bremerhaven	10 February 2026	
9 September 2025	FW	(Nigeria) Victor Udoh	(Czech Republic) Dynamo České Budějovice	23 October 2025	
4 January 2026	MF	(Northern Ireland) Ben Reeves	None (retired)		
5 February 2026	GK	(England) Khiani Shombe	(England) Hull City	5 February 2026	

== Pre-season and friendlies ==
Southampton announced their first pre-season friendly in May 2025, with the Saints hosting Brighton & Hove Albion at St Mary's Stadium on 2 August. On 5 June, an away pre-season fixture against Eastleigh was confirmed. On 11 June, Valenciennes confirmed a fixture against the Saints at Staplewood Campus. A fourth friendly was added on 16 June as part of a training camp in Spain, with a fixture against Espanyol being arranged. On 18 July, a second friendly during the training camp in Spain was added against Castellón.

Win Draw Loss Fixtures

12 July 2025 Friendly	Eastleigh	1–2	Southampton	Eastleigh
15:00 BST	Evans 2'	Report	Armstrong 45+1' (pen.); Archer 75'	Stadium: Ten Acres; Attendance: 4,434

15 July 2025 Friendly	Southampton	4–1	Gillingham	Marchwood
16:00 BST	Archer 27'; Stewart 71'; Dibling 73'; Matsuki 117'	Report	Nolan 105' (pen.)	Stadium: Staplewood Campus; Attendance: Behind closed doors
Note: Two sixty minute matches were played.

18 July 2025 Friendly	Southampton	2–1	Valenciennes	Marchwood
11:00 BST	Archer 47'; Armstrong 72'	Report	Baghdadi 17'	Stadium: Staplewood Campus; Attendance: Behind closed doors
Note: Two sixty minute matches were played.

23 July 2025 Friendly	Castellón	1–1	Southampton	Olot, Spain
10:00 BST	Mamah 63'	Report	Sienra 21' (o.g.)	Stadium: Nou Estadi Municipal; Attendance: Behind closed doors

26 July 2025 Friendly	Espanyol	2–1	Southampton	Sant Adrià de Besòs, Spain
10:00 BST	Puado 70', 77' (pen.)	Report	Downs 90+2'	Stadium: Ciutat Esportiva Dani Jarque; Attendance: Behind closed doors

2 August 2025 Friendly	Southampton XI	0–1	Brighton & Hove Albion XI	Southampton
BST		Report	Sarmiento 21'	Stadium: St Mary's Stadium; Attendance: Behind closed doors
Note: Sixty minute match played.

2 August 2025 Friendly	Southampton	2–2	Brighton & Hove Albion	Southampton
15:30 BST	Robinson 69'; Armstrong 73' (pen.)	Report	Minteh 25', 64'	Stadium: St Mary's Stadium; Attendance: 11,266; Referee: James Linnington

== Competitions ==
=== Overall record ===
Competition	First match	Last match	Starting round	Final position	Record							
Competition	First match	Last match	Starting round	Final position	Pld	W	D	L	GF	GA	GD	Win %
Championship	9 August 2025	2 May 2026	Matchday 1	4th	46	22	14	10	82	56	+26	47.83
Play-offs	9 May 2026	12 May 2026	Semi-finals	Expelled	2	1	1	0	2	1	+1	50.00
FA Cup	10 January 2026	25 April 2026	Third round	Semi-finals	5	4	0	1	9	6	+3	80.00
EFL Cup	12 August 2025	23 September 2025	First round	Third round	3	2	0	1	5	2	+3	66.67
Total					56	29	15	12	98	65	+33	51.79

Last updated: 19 May 2026
Source: Soccerway

=== Championship ===
==== League table ====
Pos	Team	Pld	W	D	L	GF	GA	GD	Pts	Promotion, qualification or relegation
2	Ipswich Town (P)	46	23	15	8	80	47	+33	84	Promotion to the Premier League
3	Millwall	46	24	11	11	64	49	+15	83	Qualification for the Championship play-offs
4	Southampton (Note: Southampton qualified for the play-offs and defeated Middlesbrough to qualify for the final, but were subsequently disqualified for multiple breaches of EFL regulations related to the unauthorised filming of other clubs' training, with Middlesbrough taking their place in the play-off final.) (D)	46	22	14	10	82	56	+26	80	Qualification for the Championship play-offs
5	Middlesbrough	46	22	14	10	72	47	+25	80	Qualification for the Championship play-offs
6	Hull City (O, P)	46	21	10	15	70	66	+4	73	Qualification for the Championship play-offs

Source: EFL Official Website
Rules for classification: 1) Points; 2) Goal difference; 3) Number of goals scored; 4) Head-to-head results; 5) Wins; 6) Away goals; 7) Penalty points (sec 9.5); 8) Number of 12-point sending off offences; 9) Play-off (only if needed to determine promotion/relegation)
(D) Disqualified; (O) Play-off winners; (P) Promoted

==== Results summary ====
Overall								Home						Away					
Pld	W	D	L	GF	GA	GD	Pts	W	D	L	GF	GA	GD	W	D	L	GF	GA	GD
46	22	14	10	82	56	+26	80	12	8	3	38	19	+19	10	6	7	44	37	+7

Last updated: 2 May 2026.
Source: Soccerway

==== Results by round ====
Round	1	2	3	4	5	6	7	8	9	10	11	12	13	14	15	16	17	18	19	20	21	22	23	24	25	26	27	28	29	30	31	32	33	34	35	36	37	38	39	40	41	42	43	44	45	46
Ground	H	A	H	A	H	A	H	A	A	H	A	A	H	A	H	A	H	A	H	H	A	H	A	A	H	A	H	H	A	A	H	A	H	H	A	A	A	H	H	A	H	H	A	H	H	A
Result	W	D	L	D	D	L	D	W	D	D	L	L	L	W	W	W	W	L	W	W	L	D	L	D	D	L	L	W	D	W	W	W	D	W	W	D	W	W	W	W	W	W	W	D	D	W
Position	5	8	10	13	15	19	19	14	17	16	18	20	21	19	17	16	13	14	11	9	10	11	12	13	14	15	15	15	15	14	14	10	11	7	7	7	7	6	6	6	5	4	4	4	5	4
Points	3	4	4	5	6	6	7	10	11	12	12	12	12	15	18	21	24	24	27	30	30	31	31	32	33	33	33	36	37	40	43	46	47	50	53	54	57	60	63	66	69	72	75	76	77	80

Updated to match(es) played on 2 May 2026. Source: Soccerway
A = Away; H = Home; W = Win; D = Draw; L = Loss

==== Matches ====
On 26 June, the Championship fixtures were released.

Win Draw Loss Fixtures

9 August 2025 1	Southampton	2–1	Wrexham	Southampton
12:30 BST	Manning 90'; Stephens 90+6'	Report	Windass 22' (pen.)	Stadium: St Mary's Stadium; Attendance: 30,970; Referee: James Bell
Note: Live on Sky Sports.

17 August 2025 2	Ipswich Town	1–1	Southampton	Ipswich
12:00 BST	Harwood-Bellis 4' (o.g.)	Report	Robinson 29'	Stadium: Portman Road; Attendance: 29,128; Referee: Bobby Madley
Note: Live on Sky Sports.

23 August 2025 3	Southampton	1–2	Stoke City	Southampton
15:00 BST	Harwood-Bellis 79'	Report	Baker 54'; Thomas 75'	Stadium: St Mary's Stadium; Attendance: 28,922; Referee: Josh Smith

30 August 2025 4	Watford	2–2	Southampton	Watford
15:00 BST	Baah 65'; Irankunda 81'	Report	Archer 10'; Manning 78'	Stadium: Vicarage Road; Attendance: 19,075; Referee: Farai Hallam

14 September 2025 5	Southampton	0–0	Portsmouth	Southampton
12:00 BST		Report		Stadium: St Mary's Stadium; Attendance: 30,889; Referee: Matt Donohue
Note: Live on ITV Sport & Sky Sports.

20 September 2025 6	Hull City	3–1	Southampton	Kingston upon Hull
15:00 BST	Joseph 22'; Lundstram 59'; McBurnie 70'	Report	Armstrong 90+5'	Stadium: MKM Stadium; Attendance: 22,085; Referee: Anthony Backhouse

27 September 2025 7	Southampton	1–1	Middlesbrough	Southampton
15:00 BST	Armstrong 61'	Report	Sène 77'	Stadium: St Mary's Stadium; Attendance: 28,605; Referee: Farai Hallam

30 September 2025 8	Sheffield United	1–2	Southampton	Sheffield
19:45 BST	Campbell 28'	Report	Stewart 51', 58'	Stadium: Bramall Lane; Attendance: 27,053; Referee: Adam Herczeg
Note: Live on Sky Sports.

4 October 2025 9	Derby County	1–1	Southampton	Derby
15:00 BST	Agyemang 40'	Report	Armstrong 7'	Stadium: Pride Park Stadium; Attendance: 29,573; Referee: Oliver Langford

18 October 2025 10	Southampton	0–0	Swansea City	Southampton
12:30 BST		Report		Stadium: St Mary's Stadium; Attendance: 27,256; Referee: Josh Smith
Note: Live on Sky Sports.

21 October 2025 11	Bristol City	3–1	Southampton	Bristol
20:00 BST	Mehmeti 33'; Twine 57', 64'	Report	Armstrong 30'	Stadium: Ashton Gate; Attendance: 24,219; Referee: Anthony Backhouse
Note: Live on Sky Sports.

25 October 2025 12	Blackburn Rovers	2–1	Southampton	Blackburn
15:00 BST	Alebiosu 76'; Guðjohnsen 86'	Report	Scienza 23'	Stadium: Ewood Park; Attendance: 13,686; Referee: Bobby Madley

1 November 2025 13	Southampton	0–2	Preston North End	Southampton
15:00 GMT		Report	Dobbin 38'; Frøkjær-Jensen 90+4'	Stadium: St Mary's Stadium; Attendance: 27,233; Referee: Matt Donohue

5 November 2025 14	Queens Park Rangers	1–2	Southampton	Shepherd's Bush
19:45 GMT	Burrell 73'	Report	Robinson 55'; Scienza 69'	Stadium: Loftus Road; Attendance: 16,404; Referee: James Bell
Note: Live on Sky Sports.

8 November 2025 15	Southampton	3–1	Sheffield Wednesday	Southampton
15:00 GMT	Jander 9'; Azaz 17'; Armstrong 47'	Report	Amass 25'	Stadium: St Mary's Stadium; Attendance: 27,607; Referee: Ruebyn Ricardo

22 November 2025 16	Charlton Athletic	1–5	Southampton	Charlton
12:30 GMT	Jones 45+1'	Report	Manning 14'; Armstrong 16'; Jander 20'; Azaz 22', 43'	Stadium: The Valley; Attendance: 22,708; Referee: Stephen Martin
Note: Live on Sky Sports.

25 November 2025 17	Southampton	3–0	Leicester City	Southampton
20:00 GMT	Harwood-Bellis 18', 42'; Azaz 23'	Report		Stadium: St Mary's Stadium; Attendance: 25,921; Referee: Gavin Ward
Note: Live on Sky Sports.

29 November 2025 18	Millwall	3–2	Southampton	Bermondsey
15:00 GMT	Azeez 72'; Taylor 81'; Crama 90+7'	Report	Armstrong 55' (pen.); Azaz 87'	Stadium: The Den; Attendance: 18,732; Referee: Ben Toner

6 December 2025 19	Southampton	3–1	Birmingham City	Southampton
15:00 GMT	Azaz 6'; Armstrong 24', 58'	Report	Gray 54'	Stadium: St Mary's Stadium; Attendance: 29,309; Referee: David Webb

9 December 2025 20	Southampton	3–2	West Bromwich Albion	Southampton
19:45 GMT	Scienza 12'; Armstrong 17', 35'	Report	Grant 62'; Phillips 86'	Stadium: St Mary's Stadium; Attendance: 26,865; Referee: Sam Allison
Note: Live on Sky Sports.

13 December 2025 21	Norwich City	2–1	Southampton	Norwich
12:30 GMT	Makama 48', 61'	Report	Manning 57'	Stadium: Carrow Road; Attendance: 25,627; Referee: James Bell
Note: Live on Sky Sports.

20 December 2025 22	Southampton	1–1	Coventry City	Southampton
12:30 GMT	Wood 56'	Report	Mason-Clark 44'	Stadium: St Mary's Stadium; Attendance: 30,584; Referee: Adam Herczeg
Note: Live on Sky Sports.

26 December 2025 23	Oxford United	2–1	Southampton	Oxford
15:00 GMT	Goodrham 23'; Mills 89'	Report	Harwood-Bellis 29'	Stadium: Kassam Stadium; Attendance: 11,500; Referee: Leigh Doughty
Note: Live on Sky Sports.

29 December 2025 24	Birmingham City	1–1	Southampton	Birmingham
20:15 GMT	Neumann 49'	Report	Archer 71'	Stadium: St Andrew's; Attendance: 27,895; Referee: Matt Donohue
Note: Live on Sky Sports.

1 January 2026 25	Southampton	0–0	Millwall	Southampton
15:00 GMT		Report		Stadium: St Mary's Stadium; Attendance: 30,182; Referee: Tom Nield
Note: Live on Sky Sports.

4 January 2026 26	Middlesbrough	4–0	Southampton	Middlesbrough
15:00 GMT	Whittaker 54', 66'; Silvera 61'; Browne 76'	Report		Stadium: Riverside Stadium; Attendance: 26,077; Referee: Oliver Langford

17 January 2026 27	Southampton	1–2	Hull City	Southampton
15:00 GMT	Stewart 71'	Report	Joseph 20'; Hughes 34'	Stadium: St Mary's Stadium; Attendance: 27,117; Referee: Sam Allison

21 January 2026 28	Southampton	1–0	Sheffield United	Southampton
19:45 GMT	Scienza 7'	Report		Stadium: St Mary's Stadium; Attendance: 25,967; Referee: Thomas Kirk
Note: Live on Sky Sports.

25 January 2026 29	Portsmouth	1–1	Southampton	Portsmouth
12:00 GMT	Adams 77'	Report	Scienza 57'	Stadium: Fratton Park; Attendance: 20,290; Referee: Lewis Smith
Note: Live on Sky Sports.

31 January 2026 30	Stoke City	0–2	Southampton	Stoke-on-Trent
12:30 GMT		Report	Azaz 10'; Downes 52'	Stadium: bet365 Stadium; Attendance: 23,529; Referee: Farai Hallam
Note: Live on Sky Sports.

7 February 2026 31	Southampton	1–0	Watford	Southampton
12:31 GMT	Larin 70'	Report		Stadium: St Mary's Stadium; Attendance: 27,721; Referee: Elliot Bell
Note: Live on Sky Sports.

10 February 2026 32	Leicester City	3–4	Southampton	Leicester
19:45 GMT	Mukasa 9'; Daka 13'; Fatawu 29'	Report	Stewart 61'; Stephens 82'; Manning 86'; Charles 90+6'	Stadium: King Power Stadium; Attendance: 25,827; Referee: Ben Toner

21 February 2026 33	Southampton	1–1	Charlton Athletic	Southampton
15:00 GMT	Stewart 48'	Report	Carey 67'	Stadium: St Mary's Stadium; Attendance: 29,476; Referee: John Busby

24 February 2026 34	Southampton	5–0	Queens Park Rangers	Southampton
20:00 GMT	Azaz 9'; Matsuki 45+2', 50'; Scienza 59'; Bree 70'	Report		Stadium: St Mary's Stadium; Attendance: 26,422; Referee: Oliver Langford
Note: Live on Sky Sports.

28 February 2026 35	Sheffield Wednesday	1–3	Southampton	Sheffield
15:00 GMT	Yates 57'	Report	Bree 17'; Manning 45+1'; Harwood-Bellis 71'	Stadium: Hillsborough Stadium; Attendance: 23,850; Referee: Gavin Ward

11 March 2026 36	West Bromwich Albion	1–1	Southampton	West Bromwich
19:45 GMT	Molumby 45'	Report	Larin 90+1'	Stadium: The Hawthorns; Attendance: 22,127; Referee: Ben Speedie
Note: Live on Sky Sports.

14 March 2026 37	Coventry City	1–2	Southampton	Coventry
12:30 GMT	Torp 90+2' (pen.)	Report	Downes 48'; Matsuki 85'	Stadium: Coventry Building Society Arena; Attendance: 31,281; Referee: Farai Hallam
Note: Live on Sky Sports.

18 March 2026 38	Southampton	1–0	Norwich City	Southampton
19:45 GMT	Azaz 24'	Report		Stadium: St Mary's Stadium; Attendance: 26,605; Referee: Lewis Smith

21 March 2026 39	Southampton	2–0	Oxford United	Southampton
15:00 GMT	Larin 6'; Charles 13'	Report		Stadium: St Mary's Stadium; Attendance: 30,426; Referee: Ben Toner

7 April 2026 40	Wrexham	1–5	Southampton	Wrexham
20:00 BST	Windass 34'	Report	Matsuki 12'; Downes 22'; Larin 61'; Stewart 81'; Azaz 83'	Stadium: Racecourse Ground; Attendance: 10,547; Referee: Gavin Ward
Note: Live on Sky Sports.

11 April 2026 41	Southampton	2–1	Derby County	Southampton
15:00 BST	Scienza 62'; Harwood-Bellis 69'	Report	Morris 38'	Stadium: St Mary's Stadium; Attendance: 31,206; Referee: Andrew Kitchen

14 April 2026 42	Southampton	3–0	Blackburn Rovers	Southampton
20:00 BST	Larin 24'; Manning 43'; Archer 86'	Report		Stadium: St Mary's Stadium; Attendance: 25,576; Referee: Josh Smith
Note: Live on Sky Sports.

18 April 2026 43	Swansea City	1–2	Southampton	Landore
15:00 BST	Stamenić 20'	Report	Charles 57'; Archer 90'	Stadium: Swansea.com Stadium; Attendance: 17,776; Referee: Oliver Langford

21 April 2026 44	Southampton	2–2	Bristol City	Southampton
19:45 BST	Larin 29'; Stewart 74'	Report	Manning 5' (o.g.); Bell 63'	Stadium: St Mary's Stadium; Attendance: 28,446; Referee: Elliot Bell
Note: Live on Sky Sports.

28 April 2026 45	Southampton	2–2	Ipswich Town	Southampton
19:45 BST	Manning 58'; Larin 80'	Report	Burns 48'; Clarke 89'	Stadium: St Mary's Stadium; Attendance: 31,180; Referee: Thomas Kirk
Note: Live on Sky Sports.

2 May 2026 46	Preston North End	1–3	Southampton	Preston
12:30 BST	Dobbin 60'	Report	Harwood-Bellis 12'; Stewart 47'; Larin 90+1'	Stadium: Deepdale; Attendance: 20,085; Referee: Stephen Martin
Note: Live on Sky Sports.

==== Play-offs ====
Southampton finished 4th in the regular season and were drawn against Middlesbrough.

In the days before the first leg, a member of Tonda Eckert's staff was accused of spying on a Middlesbrough training session. The incident was reported to the EFL.

9 May 2026 Semi final - Leg 1	Middlesbrough	0–0	Southampton	Middlesbrough
12:30 BST		Report		Stadium: Riverside Stadium; Attendance: 32,045; Referee: Farai Hallam
Note: Live on Sky Sports.

12 May 2026 Semi final - Leg 2	Southampton	2–1 (a.e.t.) (2–1 agg.)	Middlesbrough	Southampton
20:00 BST	Stewart 45+1'; Charles 116'	Report	McGree 5'	Stadium: St Mary's Stadium; Attendance: 30,277; Referee: Andrew Madley
Note: Live on Sky Sports.

Southampton won 2–1 on aggregate. Middlesbrough advanced to the final after Southampton were disqualified for spying on other teams (see Southampton F.C. espionage incident).

=== FA Cup ===
Southampton entered the FA Cup in the third round and were drawn away to Doncaster Rovers. In the fourth round, they were drawn at home to Leicester City. In the fifth round, they were drawn away to Fulham. In the quarter finals, they were drawn at home to Arsenal. For the semi final, they were drawn against Manchester City.

Win Draw Loss Fixtures

10 January 2026 Third round	Doncaster Rovers	2–3	Southampton	Doncaster
15:00 GMT	Pearson 48'; Gibson 59'	Report	Bragg 8'; Archer 24'; Matsuki 41'	Stadium: Eco-Power Stadium; Attendance: 7,671; Referee: John Busby

14 February 2026 Fourth round	Southampton	2–1 (a.e.t.)	Leicester City	Southampton
15:00 GMT	Larin 45+1' (pen.); Bree 109'	Report	Skipp 52'	Stadium: St Mary's Stadium; Attendance: 17,359; Referee: Matthew Corlett

8 March 2026 Fifth round	Fulham	0–1	Southampton	Fulham
12:00 GMT		Report	Stewart 90+1' (pen.)	Stadium: Craven Cottage; Attendance: 21,974; Referee: Jarred Gillett
Note: Live on TNT Sports.

4 April 2026 Quarter-final	Southampton	2–1	Arsenal	Southampton
20:00 BST	Stewart 35'; Charles 85'	Report	Gyökeres 68'	Stadium: St Mary's Stadium; Attendance: 31,067; Referee: Sam Barrott
Note: Live on BBC One & TNT Sports.

25 April 2026 Semi-final	Manchester City	2–1	Southampton	Wembley
17:15 BST	Doku 82'; González 87'	Report	Azaz 79'	Stadium: Wembley Stadium; Attendance: 70,053; Referee: Craig Pawson
Note: Live on BBC One & TNT Sports.

=== EFL Cup ===
Southampton were drawn away to Northampton Town in the first round, to Norwich City in the second round and to Liverpool in the third round.

Win Draw Loss Fixtures

12 August 2025 First round	Northampton Town	0–1	Southampton	Sixfields
19:45 BST		Report	Fernandes 48'	Stadium: Sixfields Stadium; Attendance: 4,381; Referee: David Rock
Note: Live on Sky Sports.

26 August 2025 Second round	Norwich City	0–3	Southampton	Norwich
19:45 BST		Report	Archer 42'; Fraser 62'; Matsuki 81'	Stadium: Carrow Road; Attendance: 17,351; Referee: Tom Nield
Note: Live on Sky Sports.

23 September 2025 Third round	Liverpool	2–1	Southampton	Liverpool
20:00 BST	Isak 43'; Ekitike 85'	Report	Charles 76'	Stadium: Anfield; Attendance: 59,518; Referee: Thomas Bramall
Note: Live on ITV Sport & Sky Sports.

== Squad statistics ==
As of 12 May 2026

No.	Pos.	Nat.	Player	League				Playoffs				FA Cup				EFL Cup				Total			
No.	Pos.	Nat.	Player	Apps.	Goals	Yellow card	Red card	Apps.	Goals	Yellow card	Red card	Apps.	Goals	Yellow card	Red card	Apps.	Goals	Yellow card	Red card	Apps.	Goals	Yellow card	Red card
1	GK	(England)	Alex McCarthy	7	0	0	0	0	0	0	0	0	0	0	0	3	0	0	0	10	0	0	0
2	DF	(Denmark)	Mads Roerslev	5(4)	0	1	0	0	0	0	0	0	0	0	0	1	0	0	0	6(4)	0	1	0
3	DF	(Republic of Ireland)	Ryan Manning	35(8)	8	4	0	2	0	0	0	3	0	2	0	3	0	1	0	43(8)	8	7	0
4	MF	(England)	Flynn Downes	32(4)	3	12	0	1(1)	0	1	0	2	0	2	0	2(1)	0	1	0	37(6)	3	16	0 (Note: On 23 April 2026, Downes was given a retrospective three-match suspension by the Football Association for violent conduct after an incident against Swansea City where he elbowed Liam Cullen during a challenge.)
5	DF	(England)	Jack Stephens	30(2)	2	5	0	0	0	0	0	0	0	0	0	0	0	0	0	30(2)	2	5	0
6	DF	(England)	Taylor Harwood-Bellis	41	7	9	0	2	0	0	0	4	0	1	0	1	0	1	0	48	7	11	0
9	FW	(Canada)	Cyle Larin	9(7)	8	2	0	1(1)	0	2	0	2(2)	1	0	0	0	0	0	0	12(10)	9	4	0
10	MF	(Republic of Ireland)	Finn Azaz	36(5)	10	5	0	2	0	1	0	3(1)	1	1	0	0	0	0	0	41(6)	11	7	0
11	FW	(Scotland)	Ross Stewart	11(14)	8	2	0	1(1)	1	0	0	2(2)	2	0	0	1(1)	0	0	0	15(18)	11	2	0
13	MF	(Brazil)	Léo Scienza	30(7)	7	1	0	2	0	0	0	3(1)	0	0	0	1	0	0	0	36(8)	7	1	0
14	DF	(England)	James Bree	17(1)	2	1	0	2	0	0	0	3(1)	1	0	0	0	0	0	0	22(2)	3	1	0
15	DF	(England)	Nathan Wood	27(8)	1	5	0	2	0	1	0	4(1)	0	0	0	3	0	0	0	36(9)	1	6	0
17	DF	(Germany)	Joshua Quarshie	11(2)	0	2	0	0	0	0	0	2(1)	0	0	0	2	0	1	0	15(3)	0	3	0
18	MF	(England)	Tom Fellows	25(12)	0	2	0	1	0	0	0	4	0	0	0	0(1)	0	0	0	30(13)	0	2	0
19	FW	(England)	Cameron Archer	11(19)	4	2	0	0	0	0	0	2(1)	1	0	0	3	1	1	0	16(20)	6	3	0
20	MF	(Germany)	Caspar Jander	32(4)	2	6	0	2	0	0	0	3(1)	0	1	0	1	0	0	0	38(5)	2	7	0
23	MF	(England)	Samuel Edozie	2(10)	0	0	0	0(2)	0	0	0	1(3)	0	0	0	0	0	0	0	3(15)	0	0	0
24	MF	(Northern Ireland)	Shea Charles	21(10)	3	6	0	1(1)	1	0	0	0(2)	1	0	0	2(1)	1	0	0	24(14)	6	6	0
25	GK	(England)	George Long	0	0	0	0	0	0	0	0	1	0	0	0	0	0	0	0	1	0	0	0
27	MF	(Japan)	Kuryu Matsuki	11(9)	4	1	0	1(1)	0	0	0	2(2)	1	2	0	0(2)	1	0	0	14(14)	6	3	0
28	MF	(Spain)	Oriol Romeu	0(6)	0	2	0	0	0	0	0	1	0	0	0	0	0	0	0	1(6)	0	2	0
32	GK	(England)	Jamie Jones	0	0	0	0	0	0	0	0	0	0	0	0	0	0	0	0	0	0	0	0
34	DF	(Brazil)	Welington	12(6)	0	2	1	0(1)	0	0	0	2	0	0	0	0	0	0	0	14(7)	0	2	1
37	MF	(Republic of Ireland)	Joe O'Brien-Whitmarsh	0	0	0	0	0	0	0	0	0(1)	0	0	0	0	0	0	0	0(1)	0	0	0
38	DF	(Denmark)	Elias Jelert	3(5)	0	0	0	0	0	0	0	2	0	0	0	1	0	0	0	6(5)	0	0	0
41	GK	(Israel)	Daniel Peretz	20	0	2	0	2	0	1	0	4	0	0	0	0	0	0	0	26	0	3	0
46	MF	(England)	Jay Robinson	7(19)	2	0	0	0	0	0	0	1	0	0	0	0(1)	0	0	0	8(20)	2	0	0
47	MF	(England)	Moses Sesay	0	0	0	0	0	0	0	0	0	0	0	0	0(1)	0	0	0	0(1)	0	0	0
48	MF	(Scotland)	Cam Bragg	7(9)	0	3	0	0(1)	0	0	0	4(1)	1	1	0	0	0	0	0	11(11)	1	4	0
49	FW	(England)	Nicholas Oyekunle	0(3)	0	0	0	0	0	0	0	0(1)	0	0	0	0	0	0	0	0(4)	0	0	0
52	DF	(England)	Sam Tabares	0	0	0	0	0	0	0	0	0	0	0	0	0	0	0	0	0	0	0	0
53	MF	(England)	Barnaby Williams	0(1)	0	0	0	0	0	0	0	0(1)	0	0	0	0	0	0	0	0(2)	0	0	0
55	DF	(England)	Tommy Dobson-Ventura	0	0	0	0	0	0	0	0	0	0	0	0	0	0	0	0	0	0	0	0
57	FW	(Spain)	Sufianu Sillah Dibaga	0	0	0	0	0	0	0	0	0(1)	0	0	0	0	0	0	0	0(1)	0	0	0
58	GK	(England)	Dylan Moody	0	0	0	0	0	0	0	0	0	0	0	0	0	0	0	0	0	0	0	0
Players with appearances who ended the season on loan
7	MF	(Nigeria)	Joe Aribo	0(7)	0	1	0	0	0	0	0	0	0	0	0	0	0	0	0	0(7)	0	1	0
16	DF	(Japan)	Yukinari Sugawara	1(1)	0	0	0	0	0	0	0	0	0	0	0	1	0	0	0	2(1)	0	0	0
21	DF	(England)	Charlie Taylor	0	0	0	0	0	0	0	0	0	0	0	0	0(2)	0	0	0	0(2)	0	0	0
22	FW	(Chile)	Ben Brereton Díaz	0	0	0	0	0	0	0	0	0	0	0	0	1(1)	0	0	0	1(1)	0	0	0
31	GK	(Republic of Ireland)	Gavin Bazunu	19	0	1	0	0	0	0	0	0	0	0	0	0	0	0	0	19	0	1	0
42	FW	(United States)	Damion Downs	1(10)	0	1	0	0	0	0	0	0	0	0	0	1(2)	0	0	0	2(12)	0	1	0
Players with appearances who left during the season
9	FW	(England)	Adam Armstrong	24(5)	11	3	0	0	0	0	0	0(1)	0	0	0	1(1)	0	0	0	25(7)	11	3	0
12	DF	(England)	Ronnie Edwards	8(3)	0	0	0	0	0	0	0	0	0	0	0	3	0	1	0	11(3)	0	1	0
18	MF	(Portugal)	Mateus Fernandes	2(1)	0	0	0	0	0	0	0	0	0	0	0	1	1	1	0	3(1)	1	1	0
26	MF	(Scotland)	Ryan Fraser	9(7)	0	0	0	0	0	0	0	0	0	0	0	1(1)	1	0	0	10(8)	1	0	0
33	MF	(England)	Tyler Dibling	0(1)	0	0	0	0	0	0	0	0	0	0	0	0	0	0	0	0(1)	0	0	0

=== Most appearances ===
As of 12 May 2026

#	Pos.	Nat.	Name	League		Playoffs		FA Cup		EFL Cup		Total		
#	Pos.	Nat.	Name	Starts	Subs	Starts	Subs	Starts	Subs	Starts	Subs	Starts	Subs	Total
1	DF	(Republic of Ireland)	Ryan Manning	35	8	2	0	3	0	3	0	43	8	51
2	DF	(England)	Taylor Harwood-Bellis	41	0	2	0	4	0	1	0	48	0	48
3	MF	(Republic of Ireland)	Finn Azaz	36	5	2	0	3	1	0	0	41	6	47
4	DF	(England)	Nathan Wood	27	8	2	0	4	1	3	0	36	9	45
5	MF	(Brazil)	Léo Scienza	30	7	2	0	3	1	1	0	36	8	44
6	MF	(Germany)	Caspar Jander	32	4	2	0	3	1	1	0	38	5	43
6	MF	(England)	Flynn Downes	32	4	1	1	2	0	2	1	37	6	43
6	MF	(England)	Tom Fellows	25	12	1	0	4	0	0	1	30	13	43
9	MF	(Northern Ireland)	Shea Charles	21	10	1	1	0	2	2	1	24	14	38
10	FW	(England)	Cameron Archer	11	19	0	0	2	1	3	0	16	20	36

=== Top goalscorers ===
As of 12 May 2026

#	Pos.	Nat.	Name	League		Playoffs		FA Cup		EFL Cup		Total		
#	Pos.	Nat.	Name	Goals	Apps.	Goals	Apps.	Goals	Apps.	Goals	Apps.	Goals	Apps.	GPG
1	FW	(England)	Adam Armstrong	11	29	0	0	0	1	0	2	11	32	0.34
1	FW	(Scotland)	Ross Stewart	8	25	1	2	2	4	0	2	11	33	0.33
1	MF	(Republic of Ireland)	Finn Azaz	10	41	0	2	1	4	0	0	11	47	0.23
4	FW	(Canada)	Cyle Larin	8	16	0	2	1	4	0	0	9	22	0.41
5	DF	(Republic of Ireland)	Ryan Manning	8	43	0	2	0	3	0	3	8	51	0.16
6	MF	(Brazil)	Léo Scienza	7	37	0	2	0	4	0	1	7	44	0.16
6	DF	(England)	Taylor Harwood-Bellis	7	41	0	2	0	4	0	1	7	48	0.15
8	MF	(Japan)	Kuryu Matsuki	4	20	0	2	1	4	1	2	6	28	0.21
8	FW	(England)	Cameron Archer	4	30	0	0	1	3	1	3	6	36	0.17
8	MF	(Northern Ireland)	Shea Charles	3	31	1	2	1	2	1	3	6	38	0.16
