= Finn Azaz =

Footballer (born 2000)

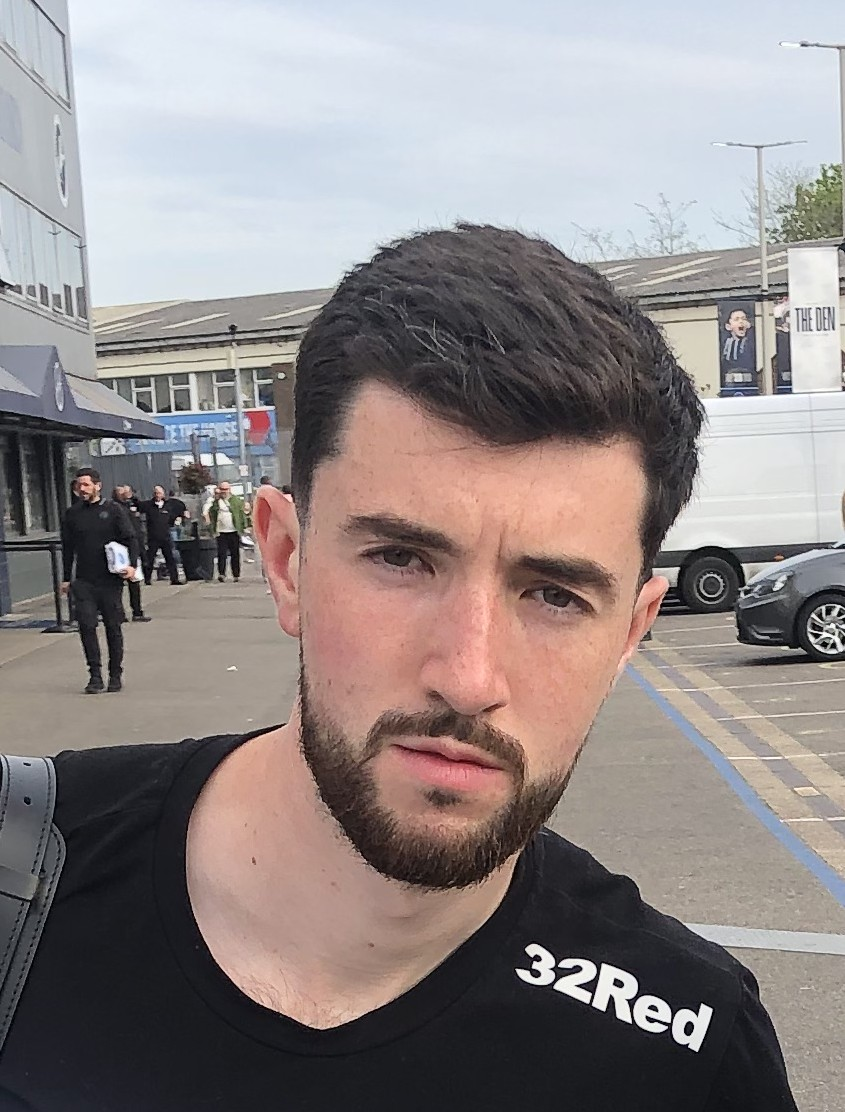
- Azaz in 2025

Personal information
- Full name: Finn Isaac Azaz
- Date of birth: 7 September 2000 (age 26)
- Place of birth: Westminster, England
- Height: 1.85 m (6 ft 1 in)
- Position: Attacking midfielder

Team information
- Current team: Southampton
- Number: 10

Youth career
- 2009–2020: West Bromwich Albion

Senior career*
Years	Team	Apps	(Gls)
2020–2021	West Bromwich Albion	0	(0)
2020–2021	→ Cheltenham Town (loan)	37	(1)
2021–2024	Aston Villa	0	(0)
2021–2022	→ Newport County (loan)	42	(7)
2022–2023	→ Plymouth Argyle (loan)	34	(8)
2023–2024	→ Plymouth Argyle (loan)	26	(7)
2024–2025	Middlesbrough	67	(17)
2025–	Southampton	56	(13)

International career^{‡}
2022	Republic of Ireland U21	1	(0)
2024–	Republic of Ireland	18	(1)
- * Club domestic league appearances and goals as of 15:34, 21 November 2026 (UTC) ‡ National team caps and goals as of 23:22, 17 November 2026 (UTC)

Finn Isaac Azaz (born 7 September 2000) is a professional footballer who plays as an attacking midfielder for EFL Championship club Southampton. Born in England, he represents the Republic of Ireland national team.

Azaz was a product of the West Bromwich Albion academy and spent the 2020–21 season on loan at Cheltenham Town. He moved to Aston Villa in July 2021 and was immediately loaned out to Newport County for the 2021–22 season. He spent two loan spells with Plymouth Argyle before signing for Middlesbrough in January 2024. Azaz joined Southampton in August 2025.

== Early and personal life ==
Born in Westminster, Azaz is of mixed Irish and Israeli heritage. His maternal grandfather was Israeli sculptor Nehemia Azaz.

His family moved to Birmingham when he was 15 months old. He attended Kings Heath Primary School and King Edwards School, where he achieved nine A*s at GCSE, and two A-Levels in French and Business, which he completed as a scholar at West Bromwich Albion. He continued his studies in French and Spanish after his A levels, for his own personal development.

== Club career ==
=== West Bromwich Albion ===
Azaz joined West Bromwich Albion at the age of 9.

Azaz moved on loan to Cheltenham Town in August 2020. He made his professional debut in September 2020 in an EFL Cup 1–0 win over Peterborough United, and his first professional goal came in the same competition in the same month in a second round 3–1 loss to Championship side Millwall.

Azaz made 44 appearances during the 2020–21 season, scoring three goals, as Cheltenham won the League Two title and secured promotion.

=== Aston Villa ===
On 26 July 2021, Azaz joined Aston Villa and was immediately loaned out to Newport County for the 2021–22 season. He made his Newport debut on 10 August 2021, in a 1–0 EFL Cup victory over Ipswich Town, in which he provided an assist for the winning goal. Azaz scored his first goal for Newport on 24 September 2021 in the 2–1 League Two defeat to Barrow. Azaz was awarded the EFL Young Player of the Month award for January 2022 after three assists as his side picked up thirteen points from six matches.

At the 2022 EFL Awards, Azaz was awarded the League Two Young Player of the Season award as well as being named in the League Two Team of the Season with teammate Dom Telford.

On 11 July 2022, Azaz signed a contract extension with Aston Villa, and joined Plymouth Argyle on a season-long loan. Azaz made his first appearance for Plymouth on 30 July 2022, scoring a debut goal in 1–0 victory over Barnsley. On 25 October, Azaz suffered a "serious" ankle injury during a 2–1 victory over Shrewsbury Town which was expected to keep him sidelined for over two months. Azaz made his return to the Plymouth starting line-up on 21 January 2023 - with two assists in a 4–2 league victory over Cheltenham Town.

Azaz scored the third goal in Plymouth's 3–1 win over Port Vale on the final day of the season as the club secured the League One title with 101 points.

On 2 August 2023, Azaz signed another contract extension with Aston Villa and re-joined Plymouth Argyle on another season-long loan.

He won Plymouth's 2023–24 Goal of the Season award for his 20-yard volley in a 3–3 draw against Watford on New Year's Day.

The loan was terminated in January 2024 after Azaz was recalled by Villa.

=== Middlesbrough ===
On 5 January 2024, Azaz signed for EFL Championship club Middlesbrough for an undisclosed fee.

Having registered five goals and four assists in six matches, Azaz was named EFL Championship Player of the Month and PFA Championship Fans' Player of the Month for November 2024. Later that month, Head Coach Michael Carrick praised Azaz, saying that, "We know his quality, his eye for a pass and for finding spaces to create for others. He’s an intelligent player and he can score goals as well. He did so before he came here and it was one of the reasons we bought him. He’s got the whole package really and he’s having a really good spell, but there’s loads more to come from him still."

Azaz finished the 2024–25 Championship season with 12 goals and 11 assists, having also reached double figures for both goals and assists the previous season.

=== Southampton ===
On 29 August 2025, Azaz joined Southampton on a four-year contract, for a reported fee of £12 million, plus potential add-ons. He made his debut for the club on 30 August in a 2–2 away draw with Watford. On 8 November, Azaz scored his first goal for the club in a 3–1 victory against Sheffield Wednesday. The goal began a run of five goals in four league appearances during November, and Azaz was subsequently named PFA Championship Fans' Player of the Month.

In the FA Cup semi-final against Manchester City at Wembley that season, Azaz gave Southampton the lead in the 79th minute before City scored twice late on to win 2–1.

== International career ==
Azaz was called up the Republic of Ireland under-21 side for the first time in September 2022. He made his under-21 debut on 27 September 2022, in a 0–0 draw against Israel in a UEFA Under-21 Championship qualification play off that Ireland lost in a penalty shootout. His first call up to the senior Republic of Ireland squad came in March 2024, ahead of their friendly games against Belgium and Switzerland. He made his senior debut for the country on 26 March 2024, coming off the bench in a 1–0 defeat against Switzerland at the Aviva Stadium. On 20 March 2025, he scored his first goal for the Republic of Ireland in a 2–1 away win against Bulgaria in the 2024–25 UEFA Nations League relegation play-offs. He was named the FAI Young International Player of the Year in June 2025.

In October 2025, Azaz was headbutted by Armenia captain Tigran Barseghyan in a World Cup qualifying match.

In October 2026, Azaz rejected rumours he would retire following discord in the Ireland squad following matches against Israel.

== Career statistics ==
=== Club ===
As of match played on 21 November 2026

Appearances and goals by club, season and competition
Club	Season	League			FA Cup		League Cup		Other		Total	
Club	Season	Division	Apps	Goals	Apps	Goals	Apps	Goals	Apps	Goals	Apps	Goals
West Bromwich Albion	2020–21	Premier League	0	0	0	0	0	0	—		0	0
Cheltenham Town (loan)	2020–21	League Two	37	1	3	1	2	1	2 (Note: Appearance(s) in EFL Trophy)	0	44	3
Aston Villa	2021–22	Premier League	0	0	0	0	0	0	—		0	0
Aston Villa	2022–23	Premier League	0	0	0	0	0	0	—		0	0
Aston Villa	2023–24	Premier League	0	0	0	0	0	0	0	0	0	0
Aston Villa	Total		0	0	0	0	0	0	0	0	0	0
Newport County (loan)	2021–22	League Two	42	7	1	0	2	0	0	0	45	7
Plymouth Argyle (loan)	2022–23	League One	34	8	0	0	1	0	4	0	39	8
Plymouth Argyle (loan)	2023–24	Championship	26	7	0	0	2	0	—		28	7
Middlesbrough	2023–24	Championship	20	4	0	0	0	0	—		20	4
Middlesbrough	2024–25	Championship	45	12	0	0	1	0	—		46	12
Middlesbrough	2025–26	Championship	2	1	0	0	0	0	—		2	1
Middlesbrough	Total		67	17	0	0	1	0	—		68	17
Southampton	2025–26	Championship	41	10	4	1	0	0	2 (Note: Appearance(s) in Championship play-offs)	0	47	11
Southampton	2026–27	Championship	15	3	0	0	2	0	0	0	17	3
Southampton	Total		56	13	4	1	2	0	2	0	64	14
Career total			252	53	8	2	10	1	8	0	288	56

=== International ===
As of match played 17 November 2026

Appearances and goals by national team and year
National team	Year	Apps	Goals
Republic of Ireland
Republic of Ireland	2024	5	0
Republic of Ireland	2025	7	1
Republic of Ireland	2026	6	0
Total		18	1

Scores and results list Republic of Ireland's goal tally first, score column indicates score after each Knight goal.

List of international goals scored by Finn Azaz
No.	Date	Venue	Opponent	Score	Result	Competition
1	20 March 2025	Stadion Hristo Botev, Plovdiv, Bulgaria	Bulgaria	1–1	2–1	UEFA Nations League relegation playoff

== Honours ==
Cheltenham Town

- EFL League Two: 2020–21

Plymouth Argyle

- EFL League One: 2022–23
- EFL Trophy runner-up: 2022–23

Individual

- EFL League Two Young Player of the Season: 2021–22
- EFL League Two Team of the Season: 2021–22
- EFL Championship Player of the Month: November 2024
- EFL Young Player of the Month: January 2022
- FAI Young International Player of the Year: 2024
