= Taylor Harwood-Bellis =

English footballer (born 2002)

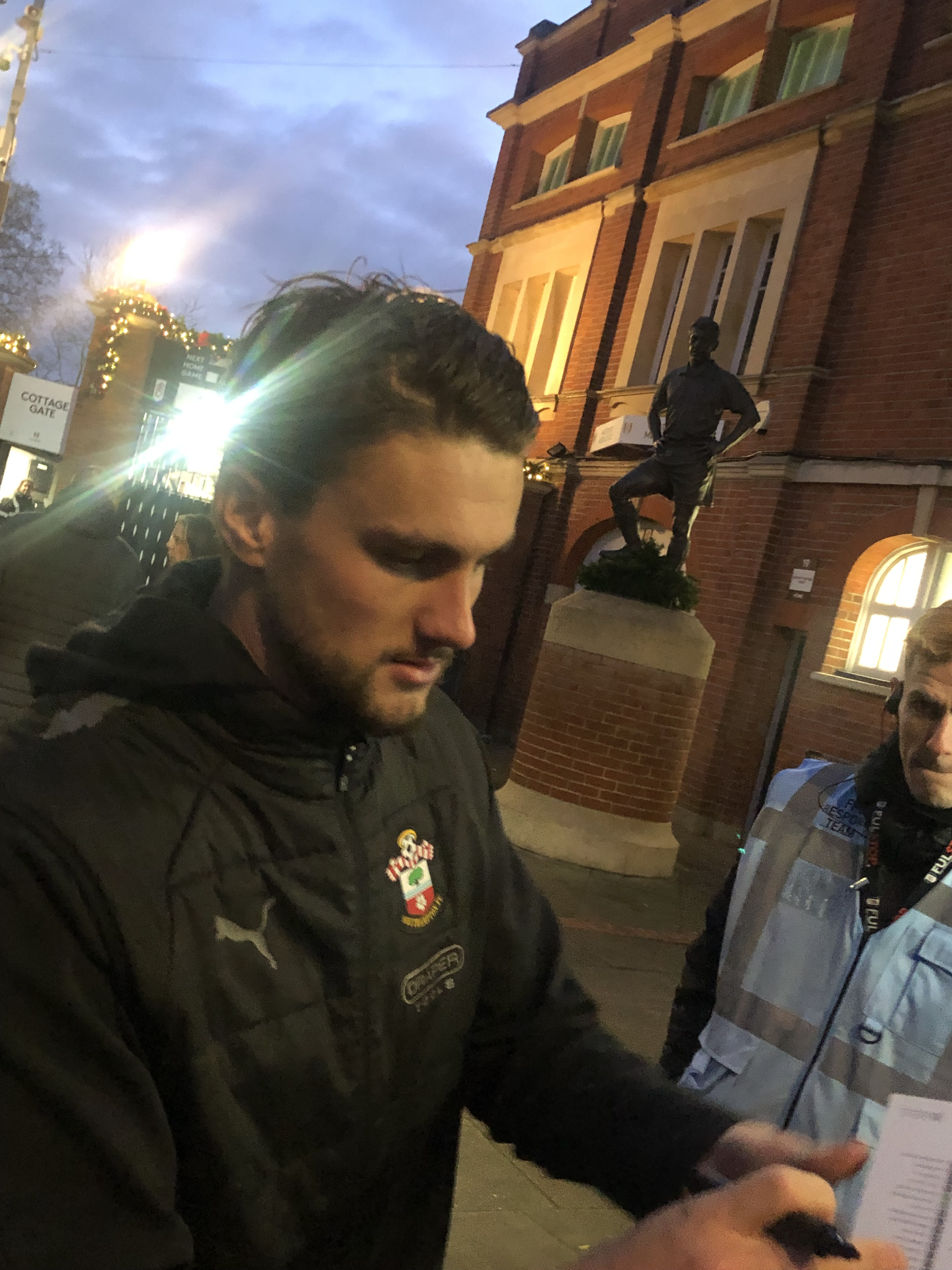
- Harwood-Bellis in 2024

Personal information
- Full name: Taylor Jay Harwood-Bellis
- Date of birth: 30 January 2002 (age 24)
- Place of birth: Stockport, England
- Height: 6 ft 2 in (1.88 m)
- Position: Centre-back

Team information
- Current team: Aston Villa
- Number: 4

Youth career
- 2008–2019: Manchester City

Senior career*
| Years | Team | Apps | (Gls) |
| 2019–2024 | Manchester City | 0 | (0) |
| 2021 | → Blackburn Rovers (loan) | 19 | (0) |
| 2021–2022 | → Anderlecht (loan) | 16 | (0) |
| 2022 | → Stoke City (loan) | 22 | (0) |
| 2022–2023 | → Burnley (loan) | 32 | (1) |
| 2023–2024 | → Southampton (loan) | 40 | (2) |
| 2024–2026 | Southampton | 76 | (8) |
| 2026– | Aston Villa | 2 | (0) |

International career^{‡}
| 2017–2018 | England U16 | 10 | (1) |
| 2018–2019 | England U17 | 12 | (2) |
| 2019 | England U19 | 5 | (2) |
| 2020 | England U20 | 1 | (0) |
| 2021–2024 | England U21 | 27 | (0) |
| 2024 | England | 1 | (1) |
Medal record
Representing England
UEFA European Under-21 Championship
| Winner | 2023 |
- * Club domestic league appearances and goals as of 21:09, 21 November 2026 (UTC) ‡ National team caps and goals as of 19:47, 23 March 2025 (UTC)

Taylor Jay Harwood-Bellis (born 30 January 2002) is an English professional footballer who plays as a centre-back for Premier League club Aston Villa and has made one appearance for the England national team.

Coming through the youth academy at Manchester City, he made his first team debut in 2019, scoring his first goal the following year. He has since spent time on loan with Blackburn Rovers, Anderlecht, Stoke City, Burnley and Southampton, before joining the latter club at the end of the 2023–24 season.

Harwood-Bellis has represented his country at U16, U17, U19, U20, U21 and full international level. In November 2024, he received his first call-up for the England senior team and scored on his debut against the Republic of Ireland.

== Club career ==
=== Manchester City ===
==== 2018–2021 ====
From Stockport, Harwood-Bellis started playing with Manchester City from the age of six. He came through the same Stockport Metro Junior League that produced City team-mate Phil Foden. Harwood-Bellis formed a centre-back partnership with Eric Garcia as part of the City youth side that made it to the FA Youth Cup final in 2019.

On 24 September 2019, Harwood-Bellis made his professional debut when he was named in the starting line up for Manchester City's EFL Cup tie away against Preston North End. He made his second appearance for City and his debut in European competitions with his 82nd-minute introduction during a 4–1 victory over Dinamo Zagreb in the Champions League group stage on 11 December 2019.

Harwood-Bellis scored his first goal for Manchester City on 4 January 2020 in a 4–1 win against Port Vale in the FA Cup. On 7 December 2020, Harwood-Bellis signed a four-year contract extension, keeping him at the club until 2024.

==== 2021–2023: Loan moves to Blackburn Rovers, Anderlecht, Stoke City and Burnley ====
On 1 February 2021, Harwood-Bellis joined Championship side Blackburn Rovers on loan for the remainder of the 2020–21 season. Five days later, he made his debut for Blackburn as a substitute for Ryan Nyambe in a 1–0 away league defeat by Queens Park Rangers.

Harwood-Bellis joined Belgian First Division A side Anderlecht on 27 June 2021 on a season-long loan deal.

On 11 January 2022, Harwood-Bellis joined Championship side Stoke City on loan until the end of the 2021–22 season. Harwood-Bellis was a regular in the side for the remainder of the season, playing 24 times as Stoke finished in 14th position.

Harwood-Bellis joined Championship side Burnley on 1 July 2022 on loan for the 2022–23 season. On 13 September, he scored his first goal for the club in a 1–1 draw against Preston North End.

=== Southampton ===
==== 2023–2025 ====
On 1 September 2023, Harwood-Bellis joined Championship side Southampton on a season-long loan with an obligation to buy for £20 million, if the club were promoted to the Premier League. He made his debut on 15 September 2023 in a 4–1 defeat to Leicester City. On 28 October 2023, Harwood-Bellis scored his first goal for the club in a 3–1 victory against Birmingham City. He started for Southampton in their Championship play-off final win against Leeds United. After the club had won promotion, he joined the club permanently, with the move effective from 1 July when he signed a four-year contract.

On 17 August 2024, Harwood-Bellis made his first Premier League appearance in a 1–0 away defeat against Newcastle United. He scored his first Premier League goal on 30 September 2024 in a 3–1 defeat against Bournemouth. Southampton were ultimately relegated from the Premier League at the end of the 2024–25 season, with Harwood-Bellis describing himself as "heartbroken".

==== 2025–2026 ====
Amid the Spygate controversy, after Southampton's second goal against Middlesbrough in their play-off semi-final second leg on 12 May 2026, Harwood-Bellis directed a binoculars celebration towards Aidan Morris. After Southampton were expelled from the play-off final and deducted four points ahead of the 2026–27 season, he apologised and stated he never would have directed the celebration towards a Middlesbrough player had he known the severity of the situation. During that game, play was temporarily paused by referee Andy Madley after Luke Ayling accused Harwood-Bellis of referencing his speech impediment. No further action was taken by the FA after Ayling decided not to pursue the allegations.

Harwood-Bellis made 48 appearances and scored seven goals in all competitions throughout the 2025–26 season and was subsequently named the Southern Daily Echo Player of the Year. He became the first defender to win the award since José Fonte in 2014–15.

=== Aston Villa ===
On 1 September 2026, Harwood-Bellis joined Aston Villa for an undisclosed fee, reported at £25million plus £4million in potential “add-ons”. He made his debut on 16 September, in a 3–1 EFL Cup victory over Coventry City.

== International career ==
Harwood-Bellis captained the England under-17 team at the 2019 UEFA European Under-17 Championship and scored in a group stage defeat against the Netherlands.

Harwood-Bellis made his U20 debut during a 2–0 victory over Wales at St. George's Park on 13 October 2020.

On 27 August 2021, Harwood-Bellis received his first call up for the England U21s. On 7 September 2021, he made his England U21 debut during the 2–0 European Championship qualification win over Kosovo U21s at Stadium MK. On 25 March 2022, Harwood-Bellis captained the U21s for the first time during a 4–1 win over Armenia at Dean Court in Bournemouth.

On 14 June 2023, Harwood-Bellis was included in the England squad for the 2023 UEFA European Under-21 Championship, and won the tournament beating Spain 1–0 in the final.

On 7 November 2024, Harwood-Bellis was named by interim manager Lee Carsley in the England senior squad to face Greece and the Republic of Ireland in the UEFA Nations League. He scored on his debut in a 5–0 victory against the Republic of Ireland on 17 November 2024.

== Personal life ==
His uncle, Steve Bellis, is the club president of Stockport County. His twin sister Becky is a basketball player and has represented Great Britain at youth level. As of November 2024, he is engaged to Leah Keane, the daughter of former Manchester United and Republic of Ireland football player Roy Keane.

== Career statistics ==
=== Club ===
As of match played 21 November 2026

Appearances and goals by club, season and competition
| Club | Season | League | | | National Cup (Note: Includes FA Cup) | | League Cup (Note: Includes EFL Cup) | | Europe | | Other | | Total | |
| Club | Season | Division | Apps | Goals | Apps | Goals | Apps | Goals | Apps | Goals | Apps | Goals | Apps | Goals |
|---|---|---|---|---|---|---|---|---|---|---|---|---|---|---|
| Manchester City U21 | 2018–19 | — | | | — | | — | | — | | 3 (Note: Appearance(s) in EFL Trophy) | 0 | 3 | 0 |
| Manchester City U21 | 2019–20 | — | | | — | | — | | — | | 4 | 0 | 4 | 0 |
| Manchester City U21 | 2020–21 | — | | | — | | — | | — | | 1 | 0 | 1 | 0 |
| Manchester City U21 | Total | | — | | — | | — | | — | | 8 | 0 | 8 | 0 |
| Manchester City | 2019–20 | Premier League | 0 | 0 | 1 | 1 | 2 | 0 | 1 (Note: Appearance in UEFA Champions League) | 0 | 0 | 0 | 4 | 1 |
| Manchester City | 2020–21 | Premier League | 0 | 0 | 2 | 0 | 2 | 0 | 0 | 0 | — | | 4 | 0 |
| Manchester City | 2021–22 | Premier League | 0 | 0 | — | | 0 | 0 | 0 | 0 | 0 | 0 | 0 | 0 |
| Manchester City | 2022–23 | Premier League | 0 | 0 | — | | — | | 0 | 0 | 0 | 0 | 0 | 0 |
| Manchester City | 2023–24 | Premier League | 0 | 0 | — | | — | | 0 | 0 | 0 | 0 | 0 | 0 |
| Manchester City | Total | | 0 | 0 | 3 | 1 | 4 | 0 | 1 | 0 | 0 | 0 | 8 | 1 |
| Blackburn Rovers (loan) | 2020–21 | Championship | 19 | 0 | — | | — | | — | | — | | 19 | 0 |
| Anderlecht (loan) | 2021–22 | Belgian Pro League | 16 | 0 | 0 | 0 | — | | 3 (Note: Appearances in UEFA Europa Conference League) | 0 | — | | 19 | 0 |
| Stoke City (loan) | 2021–22 | Championship | 22 | 0 | 2 | 0 | — | | — | | — | | 24 | 0 |
| Burnley (loan) | 2022–23 | Championship | 32 | 1 | 1 | 0 | 2 | 0 | — | | — | | 35 | 1 |
| Southampton (loan) | 2023–24 | Championship | 40 | 2 | 3 | 0 | — | | — | | 3 (Note: Appearances in Championship play-offs) | 0 | 46 | 2 |
| Southampton | 2024–25 | Premier League | 34 | 1 | 1 | 0 | 3 | 2 | — | | — | | 38 | 3 |
| Southampton | 2025–26 | Championship | 41 | 7 | 4 | 0 | 1 | 0 | — | | 2 | 0 | 48 | 7 |
| Southampton | 2026–27 | Championship | 1 | 0 | 0 | 0 | 1 | 0 | — | | — | | 2 | 0 |
| Southampton | Total | | 76 | 8 | 5 | 0 | 5 | 2 | — | | 2 | 0 | 88 | 10 |
| Aston Villa | 2026–27 | Premier League | 2 | 0 | 0 | 0 | 2 | 0 | 0 | 0 | — | | 4 | 0 |
| Career total | | | 207 | 11 | 14 | 1 | 13 | 2 | 4 | 0 | 13 | 0 | 251 | 14 |

=== International ===
As of match played 17 November 2024

Appearances and goals by national team and year
| National team | Year | Apps | Goals |
|---|---|---|---|
| England | 2024 | 1 | 1 |
| Total | | 1 | 1 |

As of match played 17 November 2024
England score listed first, score column indicates score after each Harwood-Bellis goal

List of international goals scored by Taylor Harwood-Bellis
| No. | Date | Venue | Opponent | Score | Result | Competition |
|---|---|---|---|---|---|---|
| 1 | 17 November 2024 | Wembley Stadium, London, England | Republic of Ireland | 5–0 | 5–0 | 2024–25 UEFA Nations League B |

== Honours ==
Burnley

- EFL Championship: 2022–23

Southampton

- EFL Championship play-offs: 2024

England U21

- UEFA European Under-21 Championship: 2023

Individual

- UEFA European Under-21 Championship Team of the Tournament: 2023
- PFA Team of the Year: 2025–26 Championship
