= 2026–27 Southampton F.C. season =

English football club season

Southampton
2026–27 season
- Owner: Sport Republic
- Chairman: Dragan Šolak
- Head coach: Tonda Eckert
- Stadium: St Mary's Stadium
- Championship: 6th
- EFL Cup: Second round
- Top goalscorer: League: Cyle Larin (8); All: Cyle Larin (9)
- Highest home attendance: 30,735 v Portsmouth (11 October 2026)
- Lowest home attendance: 27,299 v Swansea City (8 September 2026)
- Average home league attendance: 29,383

The 2026–27 season is the 110th season in the history of Southampton, and the second consecutive season being in the Championship. In addition to the domestic league, the club will also participate in the FA Cup and the EFL Cup.

== Players ==
N	Pos.	Nat.	Name	Age	Since	App	Goals	Ends	Transfer fee	Notes
1	GK	(Israel)	Daniel Peretz	26	2026	44	0	2030	Undisclosed	
2	DF	(Denmark)	Mads Roerslev	27	2025	11	0	2029	Undisclosed	
3	DF	(Republic of Ireland)	Ryan Manning	30	2023	136	9	2027	Free transfer	
4	MF	(England)	Flynn Downes	27	2024	125	6	2028	Undisclosed	
5	DF	(England)	Jack Stephens	32	2011	246	9	2028	Academy	Captain
6	DF	(England)	Zach Abbott	20	2026	3	0	2027	Loan	
7	MF	(Brazil)	Léo Scienza	28	2025	59	10	2029	Undisclosed	
8	MF	(Germany)	Caspar Jander	23	2025	46	2	2029	Undisclosed	
9	FW	(Canada)	Cyle Larin	31	2026	36	18	2028	Undisclosed	
10	MF	(Republic of Ireland)	Finn Azaz	26	2025	65	14	2029	Undisclosed	
11	FW	(England)	Lewis Dobbin	23	2026	16	1	2030	Undisclosed	
13	DF	(Germany)	Keven Schlotterbeck	29	2026	13	2	2029	Undisclosed	
14	DF	(England)	James Bree	28	2023	91	7	2029	Undisclosed	
15	DF	(England)	Nathan Wood	24	2024	68	1	2028	Undisclosed	
18	MF	(England)	Tom Fellows	23	2025	54	1	2029	Undisclosed	
23	MF	(England)	Samuel Edozie	23	2022	94	7	2027	Undisclosed	
25	GK	(England)	George Long	33	2026	1	0	2028	Undisclosed	
26	MF	(Scotland)	Cam Bragg	21	2013	36	2	2027	Academy	
27	MF	(Japan)	Kuryu Matsuki	23	2024	46	10	2028	Undisclosed	
28	FW	(England)	Divin Mubama	22	2026	15	2	2027	Loan	
29	MF	(Republic of Ireland)	Romeo Akachukwu	20	2024	4	1	TBC	Academy	
30	MF	(England)	James Ward-Prowse	32	2026	424	56	2028	Undisclosed	
31	GK	(England)	Jamie Jones	37	2026	0	0	2027	Free transfer	
32	GK	(England)	Aaron Ramsdale	28	2024	32	0	2028	Undisclosed	
34	DF	(Brazil)	Welington	25	2025	40	2	2029	Free transfer	

== Transfers ==
Players transferred in

Date	Pos.	Player	Club	Fee	Ref.
15 June 2026	FW	(Canada) Cyle Larin	(Spain) Mallorca	Undisclosed	
15 June 2026	GK	(England) George Long	(England) Norwich City	Undisclosed	
15 June 2026	GK	(Israel) Daniel Peretz	(Germany) Bayern Munich	Undisclosed	
20 June 2026	MF	(Mali) Issa Tounkara	(Mali) Etoiles Mandé	Undisclosed	
15 July 2026	FW	(England) Lewis Dobbin	(England) Aston Villa	Undisclosed	
27 August 2026	DF	(Germany) Keven Schlotterbeck	(Germany) FC Augsburg	Undisclosed	
28 August 2026	MF	(England) James Ward-Prowse	(England) West Ham United	Undisclosed	
1 September 2026	GK	(England) Jamie Jones	Unattached	Free transfer	
4 September 2026	GK	(Republic of Ireland) Xander Grieves	(England) Wolverhampton Wanderers	Undisclosed	
21 September 2026	MF	(Morocco) Yunus Linton	(England) Chelsea	Undisclosed	

Players loaned in

Date	Pos.	Player	Club	Duration	Ref.
11 August 2026	FW	(England) Divin Mubama	(England) Manchester City	End of season	
1 September 2026	DF	(England) Zach Abbott	(England) Nottingham Forest	End of season	

Players transferred out

Date	Pos.	Player	Club	Fee	Ref.
30 July 2026	FW	(Japan) Rento Takaoka	(Belgium) Patro Eisden Maasmechelen	Undisclosed	
7 August 2026	GK	(England) Josh Jeffries	(England) Eastleigh	Undisclosed	
11 August 2026	MF	(Northern Ireland) Shea Charles	(England) Fulham	Undisclosed	
17 August 2026	MF	(Republic of Ireland) Joe O'Brien-Whitmarsh	(England) Northampton Town	Undisclosed	
28 August 2026	GK	(Republic of Ireland) Gavin Bazunu	(England) Bolton Wanderers	Undisclosed	
1 September 2026	DF	(England) Taylor Harwood-Bellis	(England) Aston Villa	Undisclosed	
1 September 2026	DF	(England) Abdulhalim Okunola	(England) Middlesbrough	Undisclosed	

Players loaned out

Date	Pos.	Player	Club	Duration	Ref.
3 July 2026	GK	(England) Ollie Wright	(England) Gillingham	End of season	
29 July 2026	DF	(England) Jayden Moore	(England) Worthing	End of season	
6 August 2026	MF	(France) Daouda Traoré	(France) Le Mans	End of season	
7 August 2026	DF	(England) Tommy Dobson-Ventura	(England) Eastleigh	End of season	
7 August 2026	FW	(England) Nicholas Oyekunle	(England) Leyton Orient	End of season	
7 August 2026	MF	(England) Jay Robinson	(Italy) Monza	End of season	
21 August 2026	MF	(England) Moses Sesay	(England) Colchester United	End of season	
27 August 2026	DF	(Germany) Joshua Quarshie	(Austria) Sturm Graz	End of season	
28 August 2026	FW	(Chile) Ben Brereton Díaz	(England) Sheffield United	End of season	
31 August 2026	MF	(Mali) Issa Tounkara	(France) Valenciennes	End of season	
1 September 2026	FW	(England) Cameron Archer	(France) Auxerre	End of season	
1 September 2026	DF	(Japan) Yukinari Sugawara	(Italy) Cagliari	End of season	
2 September 2026	FW	(United States) Damion Downs	(United States) St. Louis City	December 2027	
9 October 2026	GK	(England) Dylan Moody	(England) AFC Totton	6 November 2026	

Players released

Date	Pos.	Player	Subsequent club	Join date	Ref.
30 June 2026	DF	(England) Will Armitage	(England) Brackley Town	1 July 2026	
30 June 2026	DF	(England) Sonnie Davis	(England) Bedford Town	9 July 2026	
30 June 2026	MF	(Spain) Oriol Romeu	(Japan) Avispa Fukuoka	13 July 2026	
30 June 2026	DF	(England) Charlie Taylor	(England) Derby County	14 July 2026	
30 June 2026	GK	(England) Alex McCarthy	(England) Leicester City	16 July 2026	
30 June 2026	DF	(England) Sam Tabares	(England) Gillingham	29 July 2026	
30 June 2026	FW	(Scotland) Ross Stewart	(Wales) Swansea City	6 August 2026	
30 June 2026	FW	(England) Will Merry	(England) Hednesford Town	7 August 2026	
30 June 2026	GK	(England) Jamie Jones	Re-signed	1 September 2026	
30 June 2026	MF	(Republic of Ireland) Will Smallbone	(England) Leicester City	1 October 2026	
30 June 2026	MF	(Nigeria) Joe Aribo	Currently unattached		
30 June 2026	GK	(England) Hugo Fisher	Currently unattached		
1 September 2026	DF	(Spain) Juan Larios	(Spain) CD Eldense	3 September 2026	

== Pre-season and friendlies ==
Southampton announced their first pre-season friendly in June 2026, with the Saints heading to Germany to play against Preußen Münster on 1 August. On 23 June, an away pre-season fixture against Eastleigh was confirmed. On 12 July, a third fixture was added against Eintracht Braunschweig.

Win Draw Loss Fixtures

18 July 2026 Friendly	Eastleigh	1–3	Southampton	Eastleigh
19:45 BST	Akoto 14'	Report	Dobbin 25'; Oyekunle 29'; Akachukwu 78'	Stadium: Ten Acres; Referee: Harry Wager

24 July 2026 Friendly	Eintracht Braunschweig	0–1	Southampton	Braunschweig, Germany
19:00 BST		Report	Downs 35'	Stadium: Eintracht-Stadion; Attendance: 5,803

29 July 2026 Friendly	SC Paderborn	2–1	Southampton	Paderborn, Germany
11:30 BST	Ter Horst 85', 89'	Report	Dobbin 49'	Stadium: Paderborn Training Ground; Attendance: Behind closed doors

1 August 2026 Friendly	Preußen Münster XV	1–1	Southampton XV	Münster, Germany
10:00 BST	Demirhan 33'	Report	Archer 21'	Stadium: Preußenstadion; Attendance: Behind closed door
Note: 70 minute match played.

1 August 2026 Friendly	Preußen Münster	1–2	Southampton	Münster, Germany
14:00 BST	Higl 13'	Report	Scienza 17'; Dobbin 89'	Stadium: Preußenstadion; Attendance: 10,357

== Competitions ==
=== Overall record ===
Competition	First match	Last match	Starting round	Final position	Record							
Competition	First match	Last match	Starting round	Final position	Pld	W	D	L	GF	GA	GD	Win %
EFL Championship	16 August 2026	May 2027	Matchday 1	TBC	16	9	4	3	31	15	+16	56.25
FA Cup	January 2027	TBC	Third round	TBC	0	0	0	0	0	0	+0	—
EFL Cup	8 August 2026	25 August 2026	First round	Second round	2	1	0	1	3	4	−1	50.00
Total					18	10	4	4	34	19	+15	55.56

Last updated: 21 November 2026
Source: Soccerway

=== Championship ===
==== League table ====
Pos	Team	Pld	W	D	L	GF	GA	GD	Pts	Promotion, qualification or relegation
4	Birmingham City	16	8	5	3	28	15	+13	29	Qualification for Championship play-off semi-finals
5	West Bromwich Albion	16	8	5	3	25	17	+8	29	Qualification for Championship play-off quarter-finals
6	Southampton	16	9	4	3	31	15	+16	27 (Note: Southampton were deducted four points due to multiple breaches of EFL regulations related to the unauthorised filming of other clubs' training.)	Qualification for Championship play-off quarter-finals
7	Queens Park Rangers	16	7	6	3	25	18	+7	27	Qualification for Championship play-off quarter-finals
8	Swansea City	16	8	3	5	24	20	+4	27	Qualification for Championship play-off quarter-finals

Updated to match(es) played on 21 November 2026. Source: EFL Official Website
Rules for classification: 1) Points; 2) Goal difference; 3) Number of goals scored; 4) Head-to-head results; 5) Wins; 6) Away goals; 7) Penalty points (sec 9.5); 8) Number of 12-point sending off offences; 9) Play-off (only if needed to determine promotion/relegation)

==== Results summary ====
Overall								Home						Away					
Pld	W	D	L	GF	GA	GD	Pts	W	D	L	GF	GA	GD	W	D	L	GF	GA	GD
16	9	4	3	31	15	+16	27^{(Note: Southampton were deducted four points due to multiple breaches of EFL regulations related to the unauthorised filming of other clubs' training.)}	7	1	0	22	5	+17	2	3	3	9	10	−1

Last updated: 21 November 2026.
Source: Soccerway

==== Results by round ====
Round	1	2	3	4	5	6	7	8	9	10	11	12	13	14	15	16	17	18
Ground	A	H	H	A	A	H	H	A	H	A	H	A	H	A	A	H	A	H
Result	L	W	W	D	D	W	W	L	W	W	D	W	W	D	L	W		
Position	24	24	18	18	19	13	8	13	11	7	7	6	5	7	7	6		
Points	−4	−1	2	3	4	7	10	10	13	16	17	20	23	24	24	27		

Updated to match(es) played on 21 November 2026. Source: Soccerway
A = Away; H = Home; W = Win; D = Draw; L = Loss

==== Matches ====
On 25 June 2026, the Championship fixtures were released.

Win Draw Loss Fixtures

16 August 2026 1	Watford	2–1	Southampton	Watford
13:30 BST	Bravo 12'; Nabizada 29'	Report	Larin 56'	Stadium: Vicarage Road; Attendance: 19,542; Referee: Matt Donohue
Note: Live on Sky Sports.

22 August 2026 2	Southampton	3–1	Stoke City	Southampton
15:00 BST	Larin 8'; Mubama 89'; Manning 90+4' (pen.)	Report	Galbraith 26'	Stadium: St Mary's Stadium; Attendance: 29,185; Referee: Steve Martin

29 August 2026 3	Southampton	5–1	Millwall	Southampton
15:00 BST	Larin 25', 62'; Azaz 38'; Scienza 55' (pen.); Fellows 86'	Report	Sykes 15'	Stadium: St Mary's Stadium; Attendance: 29,167; Referee: Adam Herczeg

1 September 2026 4	Birmingham City	1–1	Southampton	Birmingham
20:00 BST	Priske 50'	Report	Schlotterbeck 45+3'	Stadium: St Andrew's @ Knighthead Park; Attendance: 25,007; Referee: Anthony Backhouse
Note: Live on Sky Sports.

5 September 2026 5	Lincoln City	1–1	Southampton	Lincoln
12:30 BST	Ladefoged 87'	Report	Welington 44'	Stadium: ProAmpac Stadium; Attendance: 10,758; Referee: Andrew Kitchen
Note: Live on Sky Sports.

8 September 2026 6	Southampton	3–1	Swansea City	Southampton
19:45 BST	Azaz 9'; Larin 33'; Scienza 78'	Report	Vipotnik 52' (pen.)	Stadium: St Mary's Stadium; Attendance: 27,299; Referee: Lewis Smith
Note: Live on Sky Sports.

12 September 2026 7	Southampton	4–1	Bristol City	Southampton
15:00 BST	Larin 38', 61'; Matsuki 82'; Azaz 85'	Report	Tolaj 66'	Stadium: St Mary's Stadium; Attendance: 30,132; Referee: Sam Allison

19 September 2026 8	Wrexham	2–1	Southampton	Wrexham
15:00 BST	Moore 35'; Schlotterbeck 89' (o.g.)	Report	Ward-Prowse 50'	Stadium: Racecourse Ground; Attendance: 10,543; Referee: Gavin Ward

11 October 2026 9	Southampton	1–0	Portsmouth	Southampton
12:00 BST	Bree 20'	Report		Stadium: St Mary's Stadium; Attendance: 30,735; Referee: Adam Herczeg
Note: Live on Sky Sports & ITV Sport.

14 October 2026 10	Norwich City	0–1	Southampton	Norwich
19:45 BST		Report	Matsuki 54'	Stadium: Carrow Road; Attendance: 25,633; Referee: Steve Martin
Note: Live on Sky Sports.

17 October 2026 11	Southampton	0–0	Bolton Wanderers	Southampton
15:00 BST		Report		Stadium: St Mary's Stadium; Attendance: 29,634; Referee: Matt Donohue

24 October 2026 12	West Ham United	2–3	Southampton	Stratford
15:00 BST	Walker-Peters 24'; Souček 90+3'	Report	Matsuki 2'; Bree 11'; Dobbin 34'	Stadium: London Stadium; Attendance: 62,250; Referee: Michael Salisbury

31 October 2026 13	Southampton	4–1	Queens Park Rangers	Southampton
15:00 GMT	Matsuki 11'; Bragg 55'; Schlotterbeck 66'; Welington 90+5'	Report	Kone 68'	Stadium: St Mary's Stadium; Attendance: 30,531; Referee: Tim Robinson

3 November 2026 14	West Bromwich Albion	1–1	Southampton	West Bromwich
20:00 GMT	Price 22' (pen.)	Report	Edozie 53'	Stadium: The Hawthorns; Attendance: 22,985; Referee: Josh Smith
Note: Live on Sky Sports.

7 November 2026 15	Preston North End	1–0	Southampton	Preston
15:00 GMT	Thompson 33'	Report		Stadium: Deepdale; Attendance: 15,746; Referee: Tom Nield

21 November 2026 16	Southampton	2–0	Derby County	Southampton
12:30 GMT	Larin 57'; Mubama 90+5'	Report		Stadium: St Mary's Stadium; Attendance: 28,381; Referee: Sam Allison
Note: Live on Sky Sports.

24 November 2026 17	Sheffield United	v	Southampton	Sheffield
19:45 GMT				Stadium: Bramall Lane
Note: Live on Sky Sports.

27 November 2026 18	Southampton	v	Middlesbrough	Southampton
20:00 GMT				Stadium: St Mary's Stadium
Note: Live on Sky Sports.

=== FA Cup ===
As a Championship side Southampton will enter the FA Cup in the third round.

Win Draw Loss Fixtures

=== EFL Cup ===
Southampton were drawn away to Colchester United in the first round. In the second round, the Saints were drawn at home to West Ham United.

Win Draw Loss Fixtures

8 August 2026 First round	Colchester United	0–2	Southampton	Colchester
17:30 BST		Report	Larin 72'; Akachukwu 90+2'	Stadium: Colchester Community Stadium; Attendance: 5,822; Referee: Isaac Searle
Note: Live on Sky Sports.

25 August 2026 Second round	Southampton	1–4	West Ham United	Southampton
19:45 BST	Scienza 10'	Report	Ajala 41', 53'; Castellanos 75'; Bowen 84'	Stadium: St Mary's Stadium; Attendance: 15,867; Referee: Ruebyn Ricardo
Note: Live on Sky Sports.

== Squad statistics ==
As of 21e November 2026

No.	Pos.	Nat.	Player	League				Playoffs				FA Cup				EFL Cup				Total			
No.	Pos.	Nat.	Player	Apps.	Goals	Yellow card	Red card	Apps.	Goals	Yellow card	Red card	Apps.	Goals	Yellow card	Red card	Apps.	Goals	Yellow card	Red card	Apps.	Goals	Yellow card	Red card
1	GK	(Israel)	Daniel Peretz	16	0	0	0	0	0	0	0	0	0	0	0	2	0	0	0	18	0	0	0
2	DF	(Denmark)	Mads Roerslev	0(1)	0	0	0	0	0	0	0	0	0	0	0	0	0	0	0	0(1)	0	0	0
3	DF	(Republic of Ireland)	Ryan Manning	13(3)	1	4	0	0	0	0	0	0	0	0	0	1	0	0	0	14(3)	1	4	0
4	MF	(England)	Flynn Downes	13(1)	0	4	0	0	0	0	0	0	0	0	0	1(1)	0	0	0	14(2)	0	4	0
5	DF	(England)	Jack Stephens	11(1)	0	0	0	0	0	0	0	0	0	0	0	2	0	0	0	13(1)	0	0	0
6	DF	(England)	Zach Abbott	2(1)	0	1	0	0	0	0	0	0	0	0	0	0	0	0	0	2(1)	0	1	0
7	MF	(Brazil)	Léo Scienza	13	2	0	0	0	0	0	0	0	0	0	0	2	1	1	0	15	3	1	0
8	MF	(Germany)	Caspar Jander	1(2)	0	1	0	0	0	0	0	0	0	0	0	0	0	0	0	1(2)	0	1	0
9	FW	(Canada)	Cyle Larin	11(1)	8	3	0	0	0	0	0	0	0	0	0	0(2)	1	0	0	11(3)	9	3	0
10	MF	(Republic of Ireland)	Finn Azaz	15(1)	3	1	0	0	0	0	0	0	0	0	0	0(2)	0	0	0	15(3)	3	1	0
11	FW	(England)	Lewis Dobbin	5(9)	1	1	0	0	0	0	0	0	0	0	0	2	0	0	0	7(9)	1	1	0
13	DF	(Germany)	Keven Schlotterbeck	13	2	1	0	0	0	0	0	0	0	0	0	0	0	0	0	13	2	1	0
14	DF	(England)	James Bree	14(1)	2	2	0	0	0	0	0	0	0	0	0	2	0	0	0	16(1)	2	2	0
15	DF	(England)	Nathan Wood	6(1)	0	2	0	0	0	0	0	0	0	0	0	1	0	0	0	7(1)	0	2	0
18	MF	(England)	Tom Fellows	5(4)	1	1	0	0	0	0	0	0	0	0	0	2	0	0	0	7(4)	1	1	0
23	MF	(England)	Samuel Edozie	3(9)	1	0	0	0	0	0	0	0	0	0	0	0(1)	0	0	0	3(10)	1	0	0
25	GK	(England)	George Long	0	0	0	0	0	0	0	0	0	0	0	0	0	0	0	0	0	0	0	0
26	MF	(Scotland)	Cam Bragg	7(3)	1	2	1	0	0	0	0	0	0	0	0	1(1)	0	1	0	8(4)	1	3	1
27	MF	(Japan)	Kuryu Matsuki	11(5)	4	1	0	0	0	0	0	0	0	0	0	1(1)	0	0	0	12(6)	4	1	0
28	FW	(England)	Divin Mubama	1(13)	2	1	0	0	0	0	0	0	0	0	0	1	0	0	0	2(13)	2	1	0
29	MF	(Republic of Ireland)	Romeo Akachukwu	0(1)	0	0	0	0	0	0	0	0	0	0	0	1(1)	1	0	0	1(2)	1	0	0
30	MF	(England)	James Ward-Prowse	12(2)	1	0	0	0	0	0	0	0	0	0	0	0	0	0	0	12(2)	1	0	0
31	GK	(England)	Jamie Jones	0	0	0	0	0	0	0	0	0	0	0	0	0	0	0	0	0	0	0	0
32	GK	(England)	Aaron Ramsdale	0	0	0	0	0	0	0	0	0	0	0	0	0	0	0	0	0	0	0	0
34	DF	(Brazil)	Welington	3(4)	2	0	0	0	0	0	0	0	0	0	0	1	0	0	0	4(4)	2	0	0
40	FW	(England)	Princewill Ehibhatiomhan	0	0	0	0	0	0	0	0	0	0	0	0	0	0	0	0	0	0	0	0
53	MF	(England)	Barnaby Williams	0(1)	0	0	0	0	0	0	0	0	0	0	0	0	0	0	0	0(1)	0	0	0
Players with appearances who ended the season on loan
19	FW	(England)	Cameron Archer	0	0	0	0	0	0	0	0	0	0	0	0	0(1)	0	0	0	0(1)	0	0	0
22	FW	(Chile)	Ben Brereton Díaz	0(1)	0	0	0	0	0	0	0	0	0	0	0	1	0	0	0	1(1)	0	0	0
Players with appearances who left during the season
6	DF	(England)	Taylor Harwood-Bellis	1	0	0	0	0	0	0	0	0	0	0	0	1	0	0	0	2	0	0	0
