= 2024–25 Southampton F.C. season =

English football club season

Southampton
2024–25 season
- Owner: Sport Republic
- Manager: Russell Martin (until 15 December); Simon Rusk (interim, from 15 December until 21 December); Ivan Jurić (from 21 December until 7 April); Simon Rusk (caretaker, from 7 April)
- Stadium: St Mary's Stadium
- Premier League: 20th (relegated)
- FA Cup: Fourth round
- EFL Cup: Quarter-finals
- Top goalscorer: League: Paul Onuachu (4); All: Cameron Archer (5)
- Highest home attendance: 31,289 v Arsenal (25 May 2025)
- Lowest home attendance: 12,120 v Swansea City (12 January 2025)
- Average home league attendance: 30,865
Home colours	Away colours	Third colours

The 2024–25 season was the 108th season in the history of Southampton, and the club's first season back in the Premier League since the 2022–23 campaign, following their promotion from the Championship in the previous season. In addition to the domestic league, the club participated in the FA Cup and the EFL Cup.

After winning the promotion play-offs in May, head coach Russell Martin was sacked as Southampton dropped to the bottom of the league just a few hours after the team lost 5–0 to Tottenham Hotspur on 15 December 2024. Ivan Jurić replaced him on an 18-month contract on 20 December.

On 6 April 2025, Southampton were relegated to the Championship following a 3–1 defeat to Tottenham Hotspur. They were relegated after 31 games, breaking Derby County's 2007–08 and Huddersfield Town's 2018–19 record for the earliest relegation in Premier League history. The next day, Southampton announced that Ivan Jurić had left his role as manager by mutual consent with Simon Rusk taking interim charge for the last seven games of the season.

== Players ==
N	Pos.	Nat.	Name	Age	Since	App	Goals	Ends	Transfer fee	Notes
1	GK	(England)	Alex McCarthy	35	2016	155	0	2026	Undisclosed	
2	DF	(England)	Kyle Walker-Peters	28	2020	202	6	2025	Undisclosed	
3	DF	(Republic of Ireland)	Ryan Manning	28	2023	68	0	2027	Free transfer	
4	MF	(England)	Flynn Downes	26	2024	66	3	2028	Undisclosed	
5	DF	(England)	Jack Stephens	31	2011	200	7	2026	Academy	Captain
6	DF	(England)	Taylor Harwood-Bellis	23	2024	84	5	2028	Undisclosed	
7	MF	(Nigeria)	Joe Aribo	28	2022	104	9	2026	Undisclosed	
8	MF	(Republic of Ireland)	Will Smallbone	25	2008	90	9	2026	Academy	
10	MF	(England)	Adam Lallana	37	2024	283	60	2025	Free transfer	
11	FW	(Scotland)	Ross Stewart	28	2023	17	1	2026	Undisclosed	
13	GK	(England)	Joe Lumley	30	2023	8	0	2025	Free transfer	
14	DF	(England)	James Bree	27	2023	50	2	2026	Undisclosed	
15	DF	(England)	Nathan Wood	22	2024	15	0	2028	Undisclosed	
16	DF	(Japan)	Yukinari Sugawara	24	2024	32	1	2028	Undisclosed	
18	MF	(Portugal)	Mateus Fernandes	20	2024	42	3	2029	Undisclosed	
19	FW	(England)	Cameron Archer	23	2024	40	5	2028	Undisclosed	
20	MF	(Ghana)	Kamaldeen Sulemana	23	2023	74	4	2027	Undisclosed	
21	DF	(England)	Charlie Taylor	31	2024	10	0	2026	Free transfer	
24	MF	(Scotland)	Ryan Fraser	31	2024	54	8	2026	Free transfer	
26	MF	(France)	Lesley Ugochukwu	21	2024	31	1	2025	Loan	
28	DF	(Spain)	Juan Larios	21	2022	6	0	2027	Undisclosed	
29	MF	(Denmark)	Albert Grønbæk	24	2025	5	0	2025	Loan	
30	GK	(England)	Aaron Ramsdale	27	2024	32	0	2028	Undisclosed	
32	FW	(Nigeria)	Paul Onuachu	31	2023	40	4	2026	Undisclosed	
33	MF	(England)	Tyler Dibling	19	2022	43	4	2026	Academy	
34	DF	(Brazil)	Welington	24	2025	11	0	TBA	Free transfer	
35	DF	(Poland)	Jan Bednarek	29	2017	254	11	2027	Undisclosed	
37	DF	(Germany)	Armel Bella-Kotchap	23	2022	31	0	2026	Undisclosed	
39	DF	(France)	Joachim Kayi Sanda	18	2025	2	0	2029	Undisclosed	

== Transfers ==
Players transferred in

Date	Pos.	Player	Club	Fee	Ref.
1 July 2024	DF	(England) Taylor Harwood-Bellis	(England) Manchester City	Undisclosed	
1 July 2024	MF	(England) Adam Lallana	(England) Brighton & Hove Albion	Free transfer	
1 July 2024	DF	(England) Charlie Taylor	(England) Burnley	Free transfer	
3 July 2024	DF	(England) Ronnie Edwards	(England) Peterborough United	Undisclosed	
5 July 2024	DF	(England) Nathan Wood	(Wales) Swansea City	Undisclosed	
14 July 2024	DF	(Japan) Yukinari Sugawara	(Netherlands) AZ Alkmaar	Undisclosed	
16 July 2024	MF	(England) Flynn Downes	(England) West Ham United	Undisclosed	
20 July 2024	GK	(England) Khiani Shombe	(England) Lewisham Borough	Free transfer	
21 July 2024	MF	(England) Brook Myers	(England) Charlton Athletic	Free transfer	
30 July 2024	FW	(Chile) Ben Brereton Díaz	(Spain) Villarreal	Undisclosed	
30 July 2024	MF	(Japan) Kuryu Matsuki	(Japan) FC Tokyo	Undisclosed	
5 August 2024	MF	(Republic of Ireland) Romeo Akachukwu	(Republic of Ireland) Waterford	Undisclosed	
15 August 2024	MF	(Northern Ireland) Ben Reeves	(England) Eastleigh	Free transfer	
16 August 2024	FW	(England) Cameron Archer	(England) Aston Villa	Undisclosed	
16 August 2024	FW	(Brazil) Juan	(Brazil) São Paulo	Undisclosed	
20 August 2024	MF	(Portugal) Mateus Fernandes	(Portugal) Sporting CP	Undisclosed	
30 August 2024	FW	(England) Baylee Dipepa	(England) Port Vale	Undisclosed	
30 August 2024	MF	(Scotland) Ryan Fraser	(England) Newcastle United	Free transfer	
30 August 2024	GK	(England) Aaron Ramsdale	(England) Arsenal	Undisclosed	
30 August 2024	DF	(England) Sam Tabares	(England) Fulham	Undisclosed	
30 August 2024	MF	(France) Daouda Traoré	(France) Nice	Undisclosed	
1 January 2025	DF	(Brazil) Welington	(Brazil) São Paulo	Free transfer	
9 January 2025	DF	(France) Joachim Kayi Sanda	(France) Valenciennes	Undisclosed	
3 February 2025	FW	(Nigeria) Victor Udoh	(Belgium) Royal Antwerp	Undisclosed	
12 March 2025	FW	(Japan) Rento Takaoka	(Japan) Nissho Gakuen High School	Undisclosed	

Players loaned in

Date	Pos.	Player	Club	Duration	Ref.
16 August 2024	MF	(France) Lesley Ugochukwu	(England) Chelsea	End of season	
30 August 2024	MF	(England) Noel Buck	(United States) New England Revolution	31 December 2024	
30 August 2024	MF	(Ivory Coast) Maxwel Cornet	(England) West Ham United	20 January 2025	
30 August 2024	FW	(Scotland) Rory MacLeod	(Scotland) Dundee United	End of season	
21 January 2025	MF	(Denmark) Albert Grønbæk	(France) Stade Rennais	End of season	
3 February 2025	MF	(Turkey) Ízzet Furkan Malak	(Turkey) Göztepe	End of season	

Players transferred out

Date	Pos.	Player	Club	Fee	Ref.
1 July 2024	DF	(France) Romain Perraud	(Spain) Real Betis	Undisclosed	
5 July 2024	DF	(Brazil) Lyanco	(Brazil) Atlético Mineiro	Undisclosed	
8 July 2024	DF	(Croatia) Duje Ćaleta-Car	(France) Olympique Lyonnais	Undisclosed	
14 August 2024	MF	(England) Diamond Edwards	(England) Port Vale	Undisclosed	
21 August 2024	FW	(France) Sékou Mara	(France) Strasbourg	Undisclosed	
22 August 2024	GK	(Poland) Mateusz Lis	(Turkey) Göztepe	Undisclosed	
28 August 2024	MF	(Argentina) Charly Alcaraz	(Brazil) Flamengo	Undisclosed	
30 August 2024	DF	(England) Jayden Meghoma	(England) Brentford	Undisclosed	

Players loaned out

Date	Pos.	Player	Club	Duration	Ref.
25 June 2024	GK	(England) Ollie Wright	(England) Yeovil Town	3 February 2025	
4 July 2024	DF	(England) Zach Awe	(England) Accrington Stanley	3 February 2025	
19 July 2024	DF	(England) Lewis Payne	(England) Cheltenham Town	15 January 2025	
30 July 2024	MF	(Japan) Kuryu Matsuki	(Turkey) Göztepe	End of season	
31 July 2024	MF	(Scotland) Cam Bragg	(England) Crawley Town	3 January 2025	
2 August 2024	DF	(England) Nico Lawrence	(England) Milton Keynes Dons	End of season	
13 August 2024	FW	(England) Dom Ballard	(England) Blackpool	3 January 2025	
16 August 2024	FW	(Brazil) Juan	(Turkey) Göztepe	End of season	
27 August 2024	MF	(Northern Ireland) Shea Charles	(England) Sheffield Wednesday	End of season	
30 August 2024	MF	(France) Daouda Traoré	(France) Valenciennes	End of season	
4 September 2024	MF	(England) Samuel Edozie	(Belgium) Anderlecht	End of season	
1 January 2025	DF	(England) Ronnie Edwards	(England) Queens Park Rangers	End of season	
10 January 2025	DF	(England) Will Armitage	(England) Aldershot Town	End of season	
20 January 2025	FW	(Chile) Ben Brereton Díaz	(England) Sheffield United	End of season	
27 January 2025	FW	(England) Dom Ballard	(England) Cambridge United	End of season	
3 February 2025	MF	(England) Sam Amo-Ameyaw	(France) Strasbourg	End of season	
3 February 2025	FW	(England) Adam Armstrong	(England) West Bromwich Albion	End of season	
3 February 2025	GK	(Republic of Ireland) Gavin Bazunu	(Belgium) Standard Liège	End of Season	
3 February 2025	MF	(Republic of Ireland) Joe O'Brien-Whitmarsh	(England) Accrington Stanley	End of season	
4 February 2025	GK	(England) Ollie Wright	(England) Solihull Moors	End of season	
14 February 2025	GK	(United Arab Emirates) Adli Mohamed	(United Arab Emirates) United FC	End of season	

Players released

Date	Pos.	Player	Subsequent club	Join date	Ref.
30 June 2024	DF	(Northern Ireland) Matt Carson	(England) Torquay United	1 July 2024	
30 June 2024	FW	(Republic of Ireland) Luke Pearce	(Wales) Cardiff City	4 July 2024	
30 June 2024	FW	(Scotland) Ché Adams	(Italy) Torino	23 July 2024	
30 June 2024	DF	(England) Jake Vokins	(England) Eastleigh	2 August 2024	
30 June 2024	MF	(Scotland) Stuart Armstrong	(Canada) Vancouver Whitecaps	3 September 2024	
30 June 2024	DF	(England) Dynel Simeu	(Albania) Teuta	3 September 2024	

== Pre-season and friendlies ==
Southampton announced their first pre-season fixtures in June 2024, with the Saints travelling to neighbours Eastleigh on 19 July before a week-long training camp in Spain, with friendly matches against French clubs Bordeaux on 24 July and Montpellier on 27 July taking place behind closed doors. On 4 July, an away pre-season fixture against Millwall was confirmed. A fifth friendly was announced on 11 July against Oxford United at the Kassam Stadium. On 15 July, two home pre-season fixtures against Lazio and Getafe were confirmed.

Win Draw Loss Fixtures

19 July 2024 Friendly	Eastleigh	1–7	Southampton	Eastleigh
19:00 BST	Quigley 57'	Report	Armstrong 7', 17'; Smallbone 39'; Mara 50' (pen.); Manning 71'; Sugawara 78'; Alcaraz 83'	Stadium: Silverlake Stadium; Attendance: 4,000 or 5,000

24 July 2024 Friendly	Bordeaux	2–3	Southampton	Girona, Spain
10:00 BST	Diallo 20'; Marques da Silva 82'	Report	Michelin 19' (o.g.); Amo-Ameyaw 50'; Mara 56'	Attendance: Behind closed doors

27 July 2024 Friendly	Montpellier	1–3	Southampton	Girona, Spain
10:00 BST	Khazri 52'	Report	Sulemana 4'; Dibling 45'; Harwood-Bellis 55'	Attendance: Behind closed doors

31 July 2024 Friendly	Oxford United	2–0	Southampton	Oxford
19:30 BST	Harris 35'; Rodrigues 42'	Report		Stadium: Kassam Stadium; Attendance: 5,273; Referee: Gavin Ward

3 August 2024 Friendly	Millwall	0–1	Southampton	Bermondsey
13:00 BST		Report	Armstrong 64'	Stadium: The Den; Referee: Gavin Ward

7 August 2024 Friendly	Southampton	1–1	Lazio	Southampton
19:30 BST	Brereton Díaz 5'	Report	Castellanos 32'	Stadium: St Mary's Stadium; Referee: Tim Robinson

10 August 2024 Friendly	Southampton	0–0	Getafe	Southampton
14:00 BST		Report		Stadium: St Mary's Stadium; Attendance: 7,624; Referee: Jumpei Iida

== Competitions ==
=== Overall record ===
Competition	First match	Last match	Starting round	Final position	Record							
Competition	First match	Last match	Starting round	Final position	Pld	W	D	L	GF	GA	GD	Win %
Premier League	17 August 2024	25 May 2025	Matchday 1	20th	38	2	6	30	26	86	−60	5.26
FA Cup	12 January 2025	8 February 2025	Third round	Fourth round	2	1	0	1	3	1	+2	50.00
EFL Cup	28 August 2024	18 December 2024	Second round	Quarter-finals	4	2	1	1	10	8	+2	50.00
Total					44	5	7	32	39	95	−56	11.36

Source: Soccerway

=== Premier League ===
==== League table ====
Pos	Team	Pld	W	D	L	GF	GA	GD	Pts	Qualification or relegation
16	Wolverhampton Wanderers	38	12	6	20	54	69	−15	42	
17	Tottenham Hotspur	38	11	5	22	64	65	−1	38	Qualification for the Champions League league phase (Note: Tottenham Hotspur qualified for the Champions League league phase as the 2024–25 UEFA Europa League winners.)
18	Leicester City (R)	38	6	7	25	33	80	−47	25	Relegation to EFL Championship
19	Ipswich Town (R)	38	4	10	24	36	82	−46	22	Relegation to EFL Championship
20	Southampton (R)	38	2	6	30	26	86	−60	12	Relegation to EFL Championship

Source: Premier League
Rules for classification: 1) Points; 2) Goal difference; 3) Goals scored; 4) If the champions, relegated teams or qualified teams for UEFA competitions cannot be determined by rules 1 to 3, rules 4.1 to 4.3 are applied – 4.1) Points gained in head-to-head record between such teams; 4.2) Away goals scored in head-to-head record between such teams; 4.3) Play-offs
(R) Relegated

==== Results summary ====
Overall								Home						Away					
Pld	W	D	L	GF	GA	GD	Pts	W	D	L	GF	GA	GD	W	D	L	GF	GA	GD
38	2	6	30	26	86	−60	12	1	3	15	13	47	−34	1	3	15	13	39	−26

Source: Soccerway

==== Results by round ====
Round	1	2	3	4	5	6	7	8	9	10	11	12	13	14	15	16	17	18	19	20	21	22	23	24	25	26	27	28	29	30	31	32	33	34	35	36	37	38
Ground	A	H	A	H	H	A	A	H	A	H	A	H	A	H	A	H	A	H	A	H	A	A	H	A	H	H	A	A	H	H	A	H	A	H	A	H	A	H
Result	L	L	L	L	D	L	L	L	L	W	L	L	D	L	L	L	D	L	L	L	L	L	L	W	L	L	L	L	L	D	L	L	D	L	L	D	L	L
Position	16	16	19	19	18	19	19	19	20	19	20	20	20	20	20	20	20	20	20	20	20	20	20	20	20	20	20	20	20	20	20	20	20	20	20	20	20	20
Points	0	0	0	0	1	1	1	1	1	4	4	4	5	5	5	5	6	6	6	6	6	6	6	9	9	9	9	9	9	10	10	10	11	11	11	12	12	12

Source: Soccerway
A = Away; H = Home; W = Win; D = Draw; L = Loss

==== Matches ====
On 18 June, the Premier League fixtures were released.

Win Draw Loss Fixtures

17 August 2024 1	Newcastle United	1–0	Southampton	Newcastle upon Tyne
15:00 BST	Joelinton 45'	Report		Stadium: St James' Park; Attendance: 52,196; Referee: Craig Pawson

24 August 2024 2	Southampton	0–1	Nottingham Forest	Southampton
15:00 BST		Report	Gibbs-White 70'	Stadium: St Mary's Stadium; Attendance: 31,150; Referee: Sam Barrott

31 August 2024 3	Brentford	3–1	Southampton	Brentford
15:00 BST	Mbeumo 43', 65'; Wissa 69'	Report	Sugawara 90+5'	Stadium: Brentford Community Stadium; Attendance: 16,955; Referee: Josh Smith

14 September 2024 4	Southampton	0–3	Manchester United	Southampton
12:30 BST		Report	De Ligt 35'; Rashford 41'; Garnacho 90+6'	Stadium: St Mary's Stadium; Attendance: 31,144; Referee: Stuart Attwell
Note: Live on TNT Sports.

21 September 2024 5	Southampton	1–1	Ipswich Town	Southampton
15:00 BST	Dibling 5'	Report	Morsy 90+5'	Stadium: St Mary's Stadium; Attendance: 31,117; Referee: Sam Allison

30 September 2024 6	Bournemouth	3–1	Southampton	Bournemouth
20:00 BST	Evanilson 17'; Ouattara 32'; Semenyo 39'	Report	Harwood-Bellis 51'	Stadium: Dean Court; Attendance: 11,243; Referee: Michael Oliver
Note: Live on Sky Sports.

5 October 2024 7	Arsenal	3–1	Southampton	Holloway
15:00 BST	Havertz 58'; Martinelli 68'; Saka 88'	Report	Archer 55'	Stadium: Emirates Stadium; Attendance: 60,307; Referee: Tony Harrington

19 October 2024 8	Southampton	2–3	Leicester City	Southampton
15:00 BST	Archer 8'; Aribo 28'	Report	Buonanotte 64'; Vardy 74' (pen.); Ayew 90+8'	Stadium: St Mary's Stadium; Attendance: 31,145; Referee: Anthony Taylor

26 October 2024 9	Manchester City	1–0	Southampton	Manchester
15:00 BST	Haaland 5'	Report		Stadium: City of Manchester Stadium; Attendance: 52,844; Referee: Tony Harrington

2 November 2024 10	Southampton	1–0	Everton	Southampton
15:00 BST	Armstrong 85'	Report		Stadium: St Mary's Stadium; Attendance: 31,143; Referee: Andrew Madley

9 November 2024 11	Wolverhampton Wanderers	2–0	Southampton	Wolverhampton
15:00 GMT	Sarabia 2'; Cunha 51'	Report		Stadium: Molineux Stadium; Attendance: 31,403; Referee: Thomas Bramall

24 November 2024 12	Southampton	2–3	Liverpool	Southampton
14:00 GMT	Armstrong 42'; Fernandes 56'	Report	Szoboszlai 30'; Salah 65', 83' (pen.)	Stadium: St Mary's Stadium; Attendance: 31,278; Referee: Sam Barrott
Note: Live on Sky Sports.

29 November 2024 13	Brighton & Hove Albion	1–1	Southampton	Brighton and Hove
20:00 GMT	Mitoma 29'	Report	Downes 59'	Stadium: Falmer Stadium; Attendance: 31,542; Referee: Robert Jones
Note: Live on Sky Sports.

4 December 2024 14	Southampton	1–5	Chelsea	Southampton
19:30 GMT	Aribo 11'	Report	Disasi 7'; Nkunku 17'; Madueke 34'; Palmer 76'; Sancho 87'	Stadium: St Mary's Stadium; Attendance: 31,193; Referee: Tony Harrington
Note: Live on Amazon Prime Video.

7 December 2024 15	Aston Villa	1–0	Southampton	Birmingham
15:00 GMT	Durán 24'	Report		Stadium: Villa Park; Attendance: 42,453; Referee: Darren Bond

15 December 2024 16	Southampton	0–5	Tottenham Hotspur	Southampton
19:00 GMT		Report	Maddison 1', 45+4'; Son 12'; Kulusevski 14'; Sarr 25'	Stadium: St Mary's Stadium; Attendance: 31,090; Referee: Darren England
Note: Live on TNT Sports.

22 December 2024 17	Fulham	0–0	Southampton	Fulham
14:00 GMT		Report		Stadium: Craven Cottage; Attendance: 26,819; Referee: Tim Robinson
Note: Live on Sky Sports.

26 December 2024 18	Southampton	0–1	West Ham United	Southampton
15:00 GMT		Report	Bowen 59'	Stadium: St Mary's Stadium; Attendance: 31,059; Referee: Lewis Smith
Note: Live on Amazon Prime Video.

29 December 2024 19	Crystal Palace	2–1	Southampton	Selhurst
15:00 GMT	Chalobah 31'; Eze 52'	Report	Dibling 14'	Stadium: Selhurst Park; Attendance: 25,130; Referee: Michael Salisbury

4 January 2025 20	Southampton	0–5	Brentford	Southampton
15:00 GMT		Report	Schade 6'; Mbeumo 62', 69' (pen.); Lewis-Potter 90+2'; Wissa 90+4'	Stadium: St Mary's Stadium; Attendance: 31,001; Referee: Stuart Attwell

16 January 2025 21	Manchester United	3–1	Southampton	Trafford
20:00 GMT	Amad 82', 90', 90+4'	Report	Ugarte 43' (o.g.)	Stadium: Old Trafford; Attendance: 73,722; Referee: John Brooks
Note: Live on TNT Sports.

19 January 2025 22	Nottingham Forest	3–2	Southampton	West Bridgford
14:00 GMT	Anderson 11'; Hudson-Odoi 28'; Wood 41'	Report	Bednarek 60'; Onuachu 90+1'	Stadium: City Ground; Attendance: 30,180; Referee: Anthony Taylor

25 January 2025 23	Southampton	1–3	Newcastle United	Southampton
15:00 GMT	Bednarek 10'	Report	Isak 26' (pen.), 30'; Tonali 51'	Stadium: St Mary's Stadium; Attendance: 31,141; Referee: Sam Barrott

1 February 2025 24	Ipswich Town	1–2	Southampton	Ipswich
15:00 GMT	Delap 31'	Report	Aribo 21'; Onuachu 87'	Stadium: Portman Road; Attendance: 29,902; Referee: Michael Oliver

15 February 2025 25	Southampton	1–3	Bournemouth	Southampton
15:00 GMT	Sulemana 72'	Report	Ouattara 14'; Christie 16'; Tavernier 83'	Stadium: St Mary's Stadium; Attendance: 31,037; Referee: Jarred Gillett

22 February 2025 26	Southampton	0–4	Brighton & Hove Albion	Southampton
15:00 GMT		Report	João Pedro 23'; Rutter 56'; Mitoma 71'; Hinshelwood 82'	Stadium: St Mary's Stadium; Attendance: 30,775; Referee: Darren Bond

25 February 2025 27	Chelsea	4–0	Southampton	Fulham
20:15 GMT	Nkunku 24'; Neto 36'; Colwill 44'; Cucurella 78'	Report		Stadium: Stamford Bridge; Attendance: 39,485; Referee: Thomas Bramall
Note: Live on TNT Sports.

8 March 2025 28	Liverpool	3–1	Southampton	Liverpool
15:00 GMT	Núñez 51'; Salah 54' (pen.), 88' (pen.)	Report	Smallbone 45+1'	Stadium: Anfield; Attendance: 60,399; Referee: Lewis Smith

15 March 2025 29	Southampton	1–2	Wolverhampton Wanderers	Southampton
15:00 BST	Onuachu 75'	Report	Larsen 19', 47'	Stadium: St Mary's Stadium; Attendance: 30,950; Referee: Robert Jones

2 April 2025 30	Southampton	1–1	Crystal Palace	Southampton
19:45 BST	Onuachu 20'	Report	França 90+2'	Stadium: St Mary's Stadium; Attendance: 29,366; Referee: Andrew Madley

6 April 2025 31	Tottenham Hotspur	3–1	Southampton	Tottenham
14:00 BST	Johnson 13', 42'; Tel 90+6' (pen.)	Report	Fernandes 90'	Stadium: Tottenham Hotspur Stadium; Attendance: 60,984; Referee: Michael Salisbury

12 April 2025 32	Southampton	0–3	Aston Villa	Southampton
15:00 BST		Report	Watkins 73'; Malen 79'; McGinn 90+4'	Stadium: St Mary's Stadium; Attendance: 30,673; Referee: Thomas Bramall

19 April 2025 33	West Ham United	1–1	Southampton	Stratford
15:00 BST	Bowen 47'	Report	Ugochukwu 90+3'	Stadium: London Stadium; Attendance: 62,461; Referee: Andrew Kitchen

26 April 2025 34	Southampton	1–2	Fulham	Southampton
15:00 BST	Stephens 14'	Report	Smith Rowe 72'; Sessegnon 90+2'	Stadium: St Mary's Stadium; Attendance: 28,946; Referee: Tony Harrington

3 May 2025 35	Leicester City	2–0	Southampton	Leicester
15:00 BST	Vardy 17'; Ayew 44'	Report		Stadium: King Power Stadium; Attendance: 31,240; Referee: David Webb / Sam Barrott
Note: Starting referee David Webb was replaced by Sam Barrott part way through the match due to concussion.

10 May 2025 36	Southampton	0–0	Manchester City	Southampton
15:00 BST		Report		Stadium: St Mary's Stadium; Attendance: 30,937; Referee: Tim Robinson

18 May 2025 37	Everton	2–0	Southampton	Liverpool
12:00 BST	Ndiaye 6', 45+2'	Report		Stadium: Goodison Park; Attendance: 39,201; Referee: Michael Oliver
Note: Live on TNT Sports.

25 May 2025 38	Southampton	1–2	Arsenal	Southampton
16:00 BST	Stewart 56'	Report	Tierney 43'; Ødegaard 90'	Stadium: St Mary's Stadium; Attendance: 31,289; Referee: Darren Bond

=== FA Cup ===
Southampton entered the FA Cup at the third round stage, and were drawn at home to Swansea City. In the fourth round they were given another home tie, this time against Burnley.

Win Draw Loss Fixtures

12 January 2025 Third round	Southampton	3–0	Swansea City	Southampton
16:30 GMT	Sulemana 20'; Dibling 35', 65'	Report		Stadium: St Mary's Stadium; Attendance: 12,120; Referee: Tony Harrington
Note: Live on BBC One Wales.

8 February 2025 Fourth round	Southampton	0–1	Burnley	Southampton
15:00 GMT		Report	Edwards 77'	Stadium: St Mary's Stadium; Attendance: 15,253; Referee: Will Finnie

=== EFL Cup ===
As a Premier League club not competing in any European competitions, Southampton entered the EFL Cup in the second round, and were drawn away to EFL Championship side Cardiff City. They were then drawn away to fellow Premier League side Everton in the third round, at home to Championship side Stoke City in the fourth round, and at home to Liverpool in the quarter-finals.

Win Draw Loss Fixtures

28 August 2024 Second round	Cardiff City	3–5	Southampton	Leckwith
19:45 BST	Colwill 21'; Edwards 48' (o.g.); Robertson 57'	Report	Fernandes 10'; Amo-Ameyaw 30'; Archer 55', 90+4'; Bree 90+1'	Stadium: Cardiff City Stadium; Attendance: 7,225; Referee: Tom Nield
Note: Live on Sky Sports.

17 September 2024 Third round	Everton	1–1 (5–6 p)	Southampton	Liverpool
19:45 BST	Doucouré 20'	Report	Harwood-Bellis 32'	Stadium: Goodison Park; Attendance: 33,842; Referee: Darren Bond
	Penalties
	Keane (penalty scored); McNeil (penalty scored); Ndiaye (penalty scored); Lindstrøm (penalty scored); Harrison (penalty scored); Young (penalty missed)		(penalty scored) Fernandes; (penalty scored) Stewart; (penalty scored) Brereton; (penalty scored) Harwood-Bellis; (penalty scored) Aribo; (penalty scored) Bree
Note: Live on Sky Sports.

29 October 2024 Fourth round	Southampton	3–2	Stoke City	Southampton
19:45 GMT	Harwood-Bellis 19'; Armstrong 35' (pen.); Bree 88'	Report	Phillips 45'; Cannon 54'	Stadium: St Mary's Stadium; Attendance: 16,092; Referee: Lewis Smith
Note: Live on Sky Sports.

18 December 2024 Quarter-finals	Southampton	1–2	Liverpool	Southampton
20:00 GMT	Archer 59'	Report	Núñez 24'; Elliott 32'	Stadium: St Mary's Stadium; Attendance: 26,503; Referee: Simon Hooper
Note: Live on Sky Sports

== Squad statistics ==
As of 25 May 2025

No.	Pos.	Nat.	Player	League				FA Cup				EFL Cup				Total			
No.	Pos.	Nat.	Player	Apps.	Goals	Yellow card	Red card	Apps.	Goals	Yellow card	Red card	Apps.	Goals	Yellow card	Red card	Apps.	Goals	Yellow card	Red card
1	GK	(England)	Alex McCarthy	5	0	0	0	1	0	0	0	2	0	0	0	8	0	0	0
2	DF	(England)	Kyle Walker-Peters	33	0	5	0	2	0	0	0	0	0	0	0	35	0	5	0
3	DF	(Republic of Ireland)	Ryan Manning	18(6)	0	2	0	2	0	1	0	1	0	0	0	21(6)	0	3	0
4	MF	(England)	Flynn Downes	25(2)	1	12	0	0	0	0	0	1(1)	0	1	0	26(3)	1	13	0
5	DF	(England)	Jack Stephens	17(2)	1	2	2	0	0	0	0	0	0	0	0	17(2)	1	2	2
6	DF	(England)	Taylor Harwood-Bellis	32(2)	1	9	0	1	0	0	0	3	2	0	0	36(2)	3	9	0
7	MF	(Nigeria)	Joe Aribo	21(11)	3	1	0	2	0	0	0	3	0	0	0	26(11)	3	1	0
8	MF	(Republic of Ireland)	Will Smallbone	6(12)	1	1	0	0(2)	0	0	0	0	0	0	0	6(14)	1	1	0
10	MF	(England)	Adam Lallana	5(9)	0	4	0	0(1)	0	0	0	1(2)	0	0	0	6(12)	0	4	0
11	FW	(Scotland)	Ross Stewart	4(8)	1	1	0	0	0	0	0	0(1)	0	0	0	4(9)	1	1	0
13	GK	(England)	Joe Lumley	3	0	0	0	0	0	0	0	1	0	0	0	4	0	0	0
14	DF	(England)	James Bree	13(4)	0	0	0	2	0	1	0	4	2	1	0	19(4)	2	2	0
15	DF	(England)	Nathan Wood	9(2)	0	2	0	0(1)	0	0	0	3	0	1	0	12(3)	0	3	0
16	DF	(Japan)	Yukinari Sugawara	16(14)	1	4	0	0	0	0	0	1(1)	0	0	0	17(15)	1	4	0
18	MF	(Portugal)	Mateus Fernandes	34(2)	2	8	0	2	0	0	0	3(1)	1	0	0	39(3)	3	8	0
19	FW	(England)	Cameron Archer	13(22)	2	0	0	0(2)	0	0	0	3	3	0	0	16(24)	5	0	0
20	MF	(Ghana)	Kamaldeen Sulemana	17(9)	1	1	0	2	1	1	0	0(2)	0	0	0	19(11)	2	3	0
21	DF	(England)	Charlie Taylor	3(5)	0	1	0	0	0	0	0	2	0	0	0	5(5)	0	1	0
24	MF	(Scotland)	Ryan Fraser	4(4)	0	0	1	0	0	0	0	2	0	0	0	6(4)	0	0	1
26	MF	(France)	Lesley Ugochukwu	18(8)	1	7	0	2	0	0	0	3	0	0	0	23(8)	1	7	0
28	DF	(Spain)	Juan Larios	0	0	0	0	0	0	0	0	0(1)	0	0	0	0(1)	0	0	0
29	MF	(Denmark)	Albert Grønbæk	2(2)	0	0	0	0(1)	0	0	0	0	0	0	0	2(3)	0	0	0
30	GK	(England)	Aaron Ramsdale	30	0	2	0	1	0	0	0	1	0	0	0	32	0	2	0
32	FW	(Nigeria)	Paul Onuachu	11(14)	4	4	0	0(1)	0	0	0	0(2)	0	0	0	11(17)	4	4	0
33	MF	(England)	Tyler Dibling	20(13)	2	6	0	2	2	0	0	2(1)	0	1	0	24(14)	4	7	0
34	DF	(Brazil)	Welington	6(4)	0	1	0	1	0	0	0	0	0	0	0	7(4)	0	1	0
35	DF	(Poland)	Jan Bednarek	30	2	6	0	2	0	0	0	2	0	0	0	34	2	6	0
37	DF	(Germany)	Armel Bella-Kotchap	2(2)	0	0	0	0	0	0	0	0(1)	0	0	0	2(3)	0	0	0
39	DF	(France)	Joachim Kayi Sanda	0(2)	0	0	0	0	0	0	0	0	0	0	0	0(2)	0	0	0
46	FW	(England)	Jay Robinson	1(3)	0	0	0	0	0	0	0	0	0	0	0	1(3)	0	0	0
54	FW	(Republic of Ireland)	Romeo Akachukwu	0	0	0	0	0	0	0	0	0(1)	0	0	0	0(1)	0	0	0
57	DF	(England)	Jayden Moore	0	0	0	0	0	0	0	0	0	0	0	0	0	0	0	0
Players with appearances who ended the season on loan
9	FW	(England)	Adam Armstrong	15(5)	2	4	0	0(1)	0	0	0	2	1	2	0	17(6)	3	6	0
12	DF	(England)	Ronnie Edwards	0(1)	0	0	0	0	0	0	0	1	0	0	0	1(1)	0	0	0
17	FW	(Chile)	Ben Brereton Díaz	4(6)	0	1	0	0	0	0	0	0(3)	0	1	0	4(9)	0	2	0
23	MF	(England)	Samuel Edozie	0(2)	0	1	0	0	0	0	0	1	0	0	0	1(2)	0	1	0
27	MF	(England)	Sam Amo-Ameyaw	0(2)	0	1	0	0	0	0	0	1(1)	1	0	0	1(3)	1	1	0
60	MF	(Republic of Ireland)	Joe O'Brien-Whitmarsh	0	0	0	0	0	0	0	0	0(1)	0	0	0	0(1)	0	0	0
Players with appearances who left during the season
22	MF	(Argentina)	Carlos Alcaraz	0(1)	0	0	0	0	0	0	0	0	0	0	0	0(1)	0	0	0
22	MF	(Ivory Coast)	Maxwel Cornet	1(1)	0	1	0	0	0	0	0	1(1)	0	1	0	2(2)	0	2	0

=== Most appearances ===
As of 25 May 2025

#	Pos.	Nat.	Name	League		FA Cup		EFL Cup		Total		
#	Pos.	Nat.	Name	Starts	Subs	Starts	Subs	Starts	Subs	Starts	Subs	Total
1	MF	(Portugal)	Mateus Fernandes	34	2	2	0	3	1	39	3	42
2	FW	(England)	Cameron Archer	13	22	0	2	3	0	16	24	40
3	DF	(England)	Taylor Harwood-Bellis	32	2	1	0	3	0	36	2	38
3	MF	(England)	Tyler Dibling	20	13	2	0	2	1	24	14	38
5	MF	(Nigeria)	Joe Aribo	21	11	2	0	3	0	26	11	37
6	DF	(England)	Kyle Walker-Peters	33	0	2	0	0	0	35	0	35
7	DF	(Poland)	Jan Bednarek	30	0	2	0	2	0	34	0	34
8	GK	(England)	Aaron Ramsdale	30	0	1	0	1	0	32	0	32
8	DF	(Japan)	Yukinari Sugawara	16	14	0	0	1	1	17	15	32
10	MF	(France)	Lesley Ugochukwu	18	8	2	0	3	0	23	8	31

=== Top goalscorers ===
As of 25 May 2025

#	Pos.	Nat.	Name	League		FA Cup		EFL Cup		Total		
#	Pos.	Nat.	Name	Goals	Apps.	Goals	Apps.	Goals	Apps.	Goals	Apps.	GPG
1	FW	(England)	Cameron Archer	2	35	0	2	3	3	5	40	0.13
2	FW	(Nigeria)	Paul Onuachu	4	25	0	1	0	2	4	28	0.14
2	MF	(England)	Tyler Dibling	2	33	2	2	0	3	4	38	0.11
4	FW	(England)	Adam Armstrong	2	20	0	1	1	2	3	23	0.13
4	MF	(Nigeria)	Joe Aribo	3	32	0	2	0	3	3	37	0.08
4	DF	(England)	Taylor Harwood-Bellis	1	34	0	1	2	3	3	38	0.08
4	MF	(Portugal)	Mateus Fernandes	2	36	0	2	1	4	3	42	0.07
8	DF	(England)	James Bree	0	17	0	2	2	4	2	23	0.09
8	MF	(Ghana)	Kamaldeen Sulemana	1	26	1	2	0	2	2	30	0.07
8	DF	(Poland)	Jan Bednarek	2	30	0	2	0	2	2	34	0.06
