= 2021–22 Southampton F.C. season =

Southampton
2021–22 season
- Chairman: Gao Jisheng (until 4 January 2022); Henrik Kraft (from 4 January 2022)
- Manager: Ralph Hasenhüttl
- Stadium: St Mary's Stadium
- Premier League: 15th
- FA Cup: Quarter-finals
- EFL Cup: Fourth round
- Top goalscorer: League: James Ward-Prowse (10); All: James Ward-Prowse (11)
- Highest home attendance: 31,588 v Liverpool (17 May 2022)
- Lowest home attendance: 26,951 v Leicester City (1 December 2021)
- Average home league attendance: 29,939
Home colours	Away colours	Third colours

The 2021–22 season was Southampton's 10th consecutive season in the Premier League and the 105th season in existence. This season, the club participated in the Premier League, FA Cup and EFL Cup. The season covers the period from 1 July 2021 to 30 June 2022.

== Squad ==
- Ages as of the end of the 2021–22 season

N	Pos.	Nat.	Name	Age	EU	Since	App	Goals	Ends	Transfer fee	Notes
1	GK	(England)	Alex McCarthy	32	EU	Summer 2016	129	0	2022	Undisclosed	
2	DF	(England)	Kyle Walker-Peters	25	EU	Summer 2020	82	3	2025	Undisclosed	
4	DF	(Brazil)	Lyanco	25	EU	Summer 2021	18	0	2025	Undisclosed	Serbian passport
5	DF	(England)	Jack Stephens	28	EU	Summer 2011	149	6	2022	Undisclosed	
6	MF	(Spain)	Oriol Romeu	30	EU	Summer 2015	254	9	2023	£5M	
7	FW	(Republic of Ireland)	Shane Long	35	EU	Summer 2014	245	36	2022	Undisclosed	
8	MF	(England)	James Ward-Prowse	27	EU	2003	364	44	2025	Academy	Captain
9	FW	(England)	Adam Armstrong	25	EU	Summer 2021	28	2	2025	Undisclosed	
10	FW	(Scotland)	Ché Adams	25	EU	Summer 2019	110	21	2024	Undisclosed	
11	MF	(England)	Nathan Redmond	28	EU	Summer 2016	231	30	2023	Undisclosed	
13	GK	(Argentina)	Willy Caballero	40	EU	Winter 2021	4	0	2022	Free transfer	Spanish passport
15	DF	(France)	Romain Perraud	24	EU	Summer 2021	23	1	2025	Undisclosed	
16	DF	(England)	Thierry Small	17	EU	Summer 2021	1	0	2024	Undisclosed	
17	MF	(Scotland)	Stuart Armstrong	30	EU	Summer 2018	135	17	2024	£7M	
18	FW	(Albania)	Armando Broja	20	EU	Summer 2021	38	9	2022	Loan	On loan from Chelsea
19	MF	(Mali)	Moussa Djenepo	23	Non-EU	Summer 2019	67	4	2023	Undisclosed	
20	MF	(Republic of Ireland)	Will Smallbone	22	EU	2008	20	1	2024	Academy	
21	DF	(England)	Tino Livramento	19	EU	Summer 2021	32	1	2026	Undisclosed	
22	DF	(Ghana)	Mohammed Salisu	23	Non-EU	Summer 2020	52	1	2024	Undisclosed	
23	MF	(England)	Nathan Tella	22	EU	2017	41	2	2025	Academy	
24	MF	(Norway)	Mohamed Elyounoussi	27	EU	Summer 2018	52	8	2023	Undisclosed	
27	MF	(France)	Ibrahima Diallo	23	EU	Summer 2020	56	1	2024	Undisclosed	
32	MF	(England)	Theo Walcott	33	EU	Summer 2021	58	8	2023	Free transfer	
35	DF	(Poland)	Jan Bednarek	26	EU	Summer 2017	150	7	2025	£5M	
41	GK	(England)	Harry Lewis	24	EU	Summer 2015	3	0	2022	Undisclosed	
43	DF	(France)	Yan Valery	23	EU	2015	51	2	2023	Academy	
44	GK	(England)	Fraser Forster	34	EU	Summer 2014	162	0	2022	Undisclosed	

== Transfers ==
Players transferred in

Date	Pos.	Name	Club	Fee	Ref.
1 July 2021	MF	(England) Theo Walcott	(England) Everton	Free transfer	
2 July 2021	DF	(France) Romain Perraud	(France) Stade Brest	Undisclosed	
27 July 2021	DF	(England) Olly Lancashire	(England) Crewe Alexandra	Free transfer	
28 July 2021	DF	(England) Dynel Simeu	(England) Chelsea	Undisclosed	
2 August 2021	DF	(England) Tino Livramento	(England) Chelsea	Undisclosed	
10 August 2021	FW	(England) Adam Armstrong	(England) Blackburn Rovers	Undisclosed	
24 August 2021	DF	(England) Thierry Small	(England) Everton	Undisclosed	
25 August 2021	DF	(Brazil) Lyanco	(Italy) Torino	Undisclosed	
6 December 2021	GK	(Argentina) Willy Caballero	Unattached	Free transfer	
11 February 2022	DF	(England) Nico Lawrence	(England) Glebe	Undisclosed	

Players loaned in

Date	Pos.	Name	Club	Duration	Ref.
10 August 2021	FW	(Albania) Armando Broja	(England) Chelsea	End of season	

Players transferred out

Date	Pos.	Name	Club	Fee	Ref.
21 June 2021	DF	(Netherlands) Wesley Hoedt	(Belgium) Anderlecht	Undisclosed	
23 June 2021	GK	(England) Angus Gunn	(England) Norwich City	Undisclosed	
12 July 2021	MF	(Switzerland) Alex Jankewitz	(Switzerland) Young Boys	Undisclosed	
24 July 2021	MF	(Gabon) Mario Lemina	(France) Nice	Undisclosed	
24 July 2021	MF	(England) Callum Slattery	(Scotland) Motherwell	Undisclosed	
4 August 2021	FW	(England) Danny Ings	(England) Aston Villa	Undisclosed	
13 August 2021	DF	(Denmark) Jannik Vestergaard	(England) Leicester City	Undisclosed	
31 August 2021	FW	(Republic of Ireland) Michael Obafemi	(Wales) Swansea City	Undisclosed	

Players loaned out

Date	Pos.	Name	Club	Duration	Ref.
22 June 2021	DF	(England) Kayne Ramsay	(England) Crewe Alexandra	14 January 2022	
2 July 2021	DF	(England) Jake Vokins	(Scotland) Ross County	End of season	
14 July 2021	FW	(England) Dan Nlundulu	(England) Lincoln City	6 January 2022	
3 August 2021	MF	(Republic of Ireland) Will Ferry	(England) Crawley Town	End of season	
20 August 2021	GK	(England) Matthew Hall	(England) Melksham Town	End of season	
27 August 2021	FW	(England) Benni Smales-Braithwaite	(England) Gloucester City	31 December 2021	
4 January 2022	GK	(England) Jack Bycroft	(England) Dorchester Town	End of season	
6 January 2022	FW	(England) Dan Nlundulu	(England) Cheltenham Town	End of season	
11 January 2022	DF	(Spain) Jeremi Rodriguez	(Spain) Burgos	End of season	
12 January 2022	MF	(Australia) Caleb Watts	(England) Crawley Town	End of season	
14 January 2022	DF	(England) Kayne Ramsay	(Scotland) Ross County	End of season	
25 January 2022	DF	(England) Dynel Simeu	(England) Carlisle United	End of season	

Players released

Date	Pos.	Name	Subsequent club	Join date	Ref.
30 June 2021	DF	(England) David Agbontohoma	(England) Sheffield Wednesday	1 July 2021	
30 June 2021	MF	(Republic of Ireland) Thomas O'Connor	(England) Burton Albion	1 July 2021	
30 June 2021	DF	(England) Ryan Bertrand	(England) Leicester City	15 July 2021	
30 June 2021	DF	(Republic of Ireland) Kameron Ledwidge	(Republic of Ireland) Shelbourne	30 July 2021	
30 June 2021	MF	(England) Jake Hesketh	(England) Eastleigh	2 August 2021	
30 June 2021	DF	(England) James Morris	(England) Watford	2 August 2021	
30 June 2021	DF	(England) Pascal Kpohomouh	(England) Weston-super-Mare	19 August 2021	
30 June 2021	GK	(England) Kingsley Latham	(England) Farnborough	27 August 2021	
30 June 2021	MF	(Belgium) Lucas Defise	(Belgium) Union Saint-Gilloise	2 September 2021	
30 June 2021	GK	(Northern Ireland) Tommy Scott	(England) Hamworthy United	14 October 2021	
30 June 2021	DF	(France) Allan Tchaptchet	(France) Grenoble	1 February 2022	
30 June 2021	MF	(England) Josh Sims	(Scotland) Ross County	14 February 2022	
31 December 2021	DF	(England) Sam McQueen	None (retired)		

== Pre-season friendlies ==
Southampton announced two pre-season matches against Cardiff City and Swansea City for 27 July and 31 July respectively, on 2 July. Further friendlies were announced with a behind closed doors friendly against Fulham confirmed for 24 July and Athletic Bilbao to visit St Mary's Stadium on 7 August. On 25 July, a further friendly against Levante was confirmed for 4 August.

Win Draw Loss Fixtures

24 July 2021 Friendly	Southampton	1–1	Fulham	Marchwood
	Long 47'	Report	Kebano 79' (pen.)	Stadium: Staplewood Campus; Attendance: Behind closed doors

27 July 2021 Friendly	Cardiff City	0–4	Southampton	Cardiff
19:00 BST			Walcott 40'; Djenepo 66'; Adams 74', 85'	Stadium: Cardiff City Stadium

31 July 2021 Friendly	Swansea City	1–3	Southampton	Swansea
15:00 BST	Salisu 15' (o.g.)	Report	Tella 16'; Redmond 24'; Armstrong 57'	Stadium: Liberty Stadium

4 August 2021 Friendly	Southampton	1–0	Levante	Southampton
19:00 BST	Walker-Peters 62'	Report		Stadium: St Mary's Stadium

7 August 2021 Friendly	Southampton	1–3	Athletic Bilbao	Southampton
15:00 BST	Walcott 47'	Report	Vesga 34'; Villalibre 43'; Bednarek 60' (o.g.)	Stadium: St Mary's Stadium

== Competitions ==
=== Premier League ===
==== League table ====
Pos	Team	Pld	W	D	L	GF	GA	GD	Pts
13	Brentford	38	13	7	18	48	56	−8	46
14	Aston Villa	38	13	6	19	52	54	−2	45
15	Southampton	38	9	13	16	43	67	−24	40
16	Everton	38	11	6	21	43	66	−23	39
17	Leeds United	38	9	11	18	42	79	−37	38

Source: Premier League
Rules for classification: 1) Points; 2) Goal difference; 3) Goals scored; 4) If the champions, relegated teams or qualified teams for UEFA competitions cannot be determined by rules 1 to 3, rules 4.1 to 4.3 are applied – 4.1) Points gained in head-to-head record between such teams; 4.2) Away goals scored in head-to-head record between such teams; 4.3) Play-offs

==== Results summary ====
Overall								Home						Away					
Pld	W	D	L	GF	GA	GD	Pts	W	D	L	GF	GA	GD	W	D	L	GF	GA	GD
38	9	13	16	43	67	−24	40	6	7	6	23	24	−1	3	6	10	20	43	−23

==== Results by matchday ====
Matchday	1	2	3	4	5	6	7	8	9	10	11	12	13	14	15	16	17	18	19	20	21	22	23	24	25	26	27	28	29	30	31	32	33	34	35	36	37	38
Ground	A	H	A	H	A	H	A	H	H	A	H	A	A	H	H	A	A	A	H	H	A	H	A	A	H	H	A	H	H	A	H	H	A	A	H	A	H	A
Result	L	D	D	D	D	L	L	W	D	W	W	L	L	D	D	L	D	W	D	W	L	D	W	D	W	W	L	L	L	D	L	W	L	D	L	L	L	L
Position	16	13	13	14	15	16	17	15	16	14	13	13	15	16	16	16	15	14	13	11	12	12	10	10	10	9	9	10	10	12	14	12	13	13	15	15	15	15

Source: Statto.com
A = Away; H = Home; W = Win; D = Draw; L = Loss

==== Matches ====
The league fixtures were revealed on 16 June 2021.

14 August 2021 1	Everton	3–1	Southampton	Walton
15:00 BST	Richarlison 47'; Doucouré 76'; Calvert-Lewin 81'	Report	A. Armstrong 22'	Stadium: Goodison Park; Attendance: 38,487; Referee: Andy Madley

22 August 2021 2	Southampton	1–1	Manchester United	Southampton
14:00 BST	Fred 30' (o.g.)	Report	Greenwood 55'	Stadium: St Mary's Stadium; Attendance: 29,485; Referee: Craig Pawson
Note: Live on Sky Sports.

28 August 2021 3	Newcastle United	2–2	Southampton	Newcastle
15:00 BST	Wilson 52'; Saint-Maximin 90'	Report	Elyounoussi 74'; Ward-Prowse 90+6' (pen.)	Stadium: St James' Park; Attendance: 44,017; Referee: Paul Tierney

11 September 2021 4	Southampton	0–0	West Ham United	Southampton
15:00 BST		Report		Stadium: St Mary's Stadium; Attendance: 27,861; Referee: David Coote

18 September 2021 5	Manchester City	0–0	Southampton	Manchester
15:00 BST		Report		Stadium: City of Manchester Stadium; Attendance: 52,698; Referee: Jonathan Moss

26 September 2021 6	Southampton	0–1	Wolverhampton Wanderers	Southampton
14:00 BST		Report	Jiménez 61'	Stadium: St Mary's Stadium; Attendance: 28,002; Referee: Andrew Madley
Note: Live on Sky Sports.

2 October 2021 7	Chelsea	3–1	Southampton	Fulham
15:00 BST	Chalobah 9'; Werner 84'; Chilwell 89'	Report	Ward-Prowse 61' (pen.)	Stadium: Stamford Bridge; Attendance: 40,109; Referee: Martin Atkinson

16 October 2021 8	Southampton	1–0	Leeds United	Southampton
15:00 BST	Broja 53'	Report		Stadium: St Mary's Stadium; Attendance: 30,506; Referee: David Coote

23 October 2021 9	Southampton	2–2	Burnley	Southampton
15:00 BST	Livramento 41'; Broja 50'	Report	Cornet 13', 57'	Stadium: St Mary's Stadium; Attendance: 29,145; Referee: Chris Kavanagh

30 October 2021 10	Watford	0–1	Southampton	Watford
15:00 BST		Report	Adams 20'	Stadium: Vicarage Road; Attendance: 20,869; Referee: Peter Bankes

5 November 2021 11	Southampton	1–0	Aston Villa	Southampton
20:00 GMT	A. Armstrong 3'	Report		Stadium: St Mary's Stadium; Attendance: 30,178; Referee: Andrew Madley
Note: Live on Sky Sports.

20 November 2021 12	Norwich City	2–1	Southampton	Norwich
15:00 GMT	Pukki 7'; Hanley 79'	Report	Adams 4'	Stadium: Carrow Road; Attendance: 26,885; Referee: Martin Atkinson

27 November 2021 13	Liverpool	4–0	Southampton	Liverpool
15:00 GMT	Jota 2', 32'; Thiago 37'; Van Dijk 52'	Report		Stadium: Anfield; Attendance: 53,040; Referee: Andre Marriner

1 December 2021 14	Southampton	2–2	Leicester City	Southampton
19:30 GMT	Bednarek 3'; Adams 34'	Report	Evans 22'; Maddison 49'	Stadium: St Mary's Stadium; Attendance: 26,951; Referee: Robert Jones
Note: Live on Amazon Prime.

4 December 2021 15	Southampton	1–1	Brighton & Hove Albion	Southampton
15:00 GMT	Broja 29'	Report	Maupay 90+8'	Stadium: St Mary's Stadium; Attendance: 28,706; Referee: Anthony Taylor

11 December 2021 16	Arsenal	3–0	Southampton	London
15:00 GMT	Lacazette 21'; Ødegaard 27'; Gabriel 62'	Report		Stadium: Emirates Stadium; Attendance: 59,653; Referee: Jarred Gillett

15 December 2021 17	Crystal Palace	2–2	Southampton	Croydon
19:30 GMT	Zaha 2'; Ayew 65'	Report	Ward-Prowse 32'; Broja 36'	Stadium: Selhurst Park; Attendance: 22,861; Referee: Simon Hooper
Note: Live on BT Sport.

26 December 2021 18	West Ham United	2–3	Southampton	Stratford
15:00 GMT	Antonio 49'; Benrahma 64'	Report	Elyounoussi 8'; Ward-Prowse 61' (pen.); Bednarek 70'	Stadium: London Stadium; Attendance: 41,027; Referee: Kevin Friend

28 December 2021 19	Southampton	1–1	Tottenham Hotspur	Southampton
15:00 GMT	Ward-Prowse 25'	Report	Kane 41' (pen.)	Stadium: St Mary's Stadium; Attendance: 31,304; Referee: Anthony Taylor
Note: Live on Amazon Prime.

11 January 2022 20	Southampton	4–1	Brentford	Southampton
19:45 GMT	Bednarek 5'; Fernández 37' (o.g.); Broja 49'; Adams 70'	Report	Janelt 23'	Stadium: St Mary's Stadium; Attendance: 27,383; Referee: Stuart Attwell

15 January 2022 21	Wolverhampton Wanderers	3–1	Southampton	Wolverhampton
15:00 GMT	Jiménez 37' (pen.); Coady 59'; Traoré 90+1'	Report	Ward-Prowse 84'	Stadium: Molineux Stadium; Attendance: 30,057; Referee: Michael Salisbury

22 January 2022 22	Southampton	1–1	Manchester City	Southampton
17:30 GMT	Walker-Peters 7'	Report	Laporte 65'	Stadium: St Mary's Stadium; Attendance: 31,178; Referee: Simon Hooper
Note: Live on Sky Sports.

9 February 2022 23	Tottenham Hotspur	2–3	Southampton	Tottenham
19:45 GMT	Bednarek 18' (o.g.); Son 70'	Report	Broja 23'; Elyounoussi 80'; Adams 82'	Stadium: Tottenham Hotspur Stadium; Attendance: 54,012; Referee: David Coote
Note: Live on BT Sport.

12 February 2022 24	Manchester United	1–1	Southampton	Manchester
12:30 GMT	Sancho 21'	Report	Adams 48'	Stadium: Old Trafford; Attendance: 73,084; Referee: Stuart Attwell
Note: Live on BT Sport.

19 February 2022 25	Southampton	2–0	Everton	Southampton
15:00 GMT	S. Armstrong 52'; Long 84'	Report		Stadium: St Mary's Stadium; Attendance: 31,312; Referee: Andrew Madley

25 February 2022 26	Southampton	2–0	Norwich City	Southampton
20:00 GMT	Adams 36'; Romeu 88'	Report		Stadium: St Mary's Stadium; Attendance: 31,182; Referee: Simon Hooper
Note: Live on Sky Sports.

5 March 2022 27	Aston Villa	4–0	Southampton	Aston
15:00 GMT	Watkins 9'; Douglas Luiz 44'; Coutinho 52'; Ings 54'	Report		Stadium: Villa Park; Attendance: 41,855; Referee: Peter Bankes

10 March 2022 28	Southampton	1–2	Newcastle United	Southampton
19:30 GMT	S. Armstrong 25'	Report	Wood 32'; Bruno Guimarães 52'	Stadium: St Mary's Stadium; Attendance: 31,016; Referee: Kevin Friend

13 March 2022 29	Southampton	1–2	Watford	Southampton
14:00 GMT	Elyounoussi 45'	Report	Hernández 14', 34'	Stadium: St Mary's Stadium; Attendance: 28,863; Referee: Graham Scott

2 April 2022 30	Leeds United	1–1	Southampton	Leeds
15:00 BST	Harrison 29'	Report	Ward-Prowse 49'	Stadium: Elland Road; Attendance: 36,580; Referee: Anthony Taylor

9 April 2022 31	Southampton	0–6	Chelsea	Southampton
15:00 BST		Report	Alonso 8'; Mount 16', 54'; Werner 21', 49'; Havertz 31'	Stadium: St Mary's Stadium; Attendance: 31,359; Referee: Kevin Friend

16 April 2022 32	Southampton	1–0	Arsenal	Southampton
15:00 BST	Bednarek 44'	Report		Stadium: St Mary's Stadium; Attendance: 31,465; Referee: Peter Bankes

21 April 2022 33	Burnley	2–0	Southampton	Burnley
19:45 BST	Roberts 12'; Collins 44'	Report		Stadium: Turf Moor; Attendance: 17,384; Referee: Stuart Attwell
Note: Live on Sky Sports.

24 April 2022 34	Brighton & Hove Albion	2–2	Southampton	Falmer
14:00 BST	Welbeck 2'; Salisu 44' (o.g.)	Report	Ward-Prowse 45+4', 54'	Stadium: Falmer Stadium; Attendance: 31,335; Referee: Robert Jones

30 April 2022 35	Southampton	1–2	Crystal Palace	Southampton
15:00 BST	Romeu 9'	Report	Eze 60'; Zaha 90+2'	Stadium: St Mary's Stadium; Attendance: 31,359; Referee: Jarred Gillett

7 May 2022 36	Brentford	3–0	Southampton	Brentford
15:00 BST	Jansson 13'; Wissa 14'; Ajer 79'	Report		Stadium: Brentford Community Stadium; Attendance: 17,051; Referee: Michael Salisbury

17 May 2022 37	Southampton	1–2	Liverpool	Southampton
19:45 BST	Redmond 13'	Report	Minamino 27'; Matip 67'	Stadium: St Mary's Stadium; Attendance: 31,588; Referee: Martin Atkinson
Note: Live on Sky Sports.

22 May 2022 38	Leicester City	4–1	Southampton	Leicester
16:00 BST	Maddison 49'; Vardy 74'; Pérez 81', 90+6'	Report	Ward-Prowse 79' (pen.)	Stadium: King Power Stadium; Attendance: 32,003; Referee: Jonathan Moss

=== FA Cup ===
The Saints entered the competition in the third round and were drawn away to Swansea City. On 9 January 2022, the Saints were drawn at home to Coventry City in the fourth round. On 6 February 2022, the Saints were drawn at home to West Ham United in the fifth round. On 3 March 2022, the Saints were drawn at home to Manchester City in the quarter-finals.

8 January 2022 Third round	Swansea City	2–3 (a.e.t.)	Southampton	Landore
17:30 GMT	Piroe 77'; Bednarek 94' (o.g.)	Report	Redmond 8'; Elyounoussi 95'; Long 102'	Stadium: Swansea.com Stadium; Attendance: Behind closed doors Referee: Simon Hooper
Note: Live on BBC Wales.

5 February 2022 Fourth round	Southampton	2–1 (a.e.t.)	Coventry City	Southampton
15:00 GMT	Armstrong 63'; Walker-Peters 112'	Report	Gyökeres 22'	Stadium: St Mary's Stadium; Attendance: 30,512; Referee: Tony Harrington

2 March 2022 Fifth round	Southampton	3–1	West Ham United	Southampton
19:30 GMT	Perraud 31'; Ward-Prowse 69' (pen.); Broja 90+5'	Report	Antonio 60'	Stadium: St Mary's Stadium; Attendance: 28,383; Referee: Andre Marriner
Note: Live on BBC Red Button.

20 March 2022 Quarter-finals	Southampton	1–4	Manchester City	Southampton
15:00 GMT	Laporte 45+2' (o.g.)	Report	Sterling 12'; De Bruyne 62' (pen.); Foden 75'; Mahrez 78'	Stadium: St Mary's Stadium; Attendance: 29,702; Referee: Mike Dean
Note: Live on BBC One.

=== EFL Cup ===
The Saints entered the competition in the second round and were drawn away to Newport County. On 25 August, the draw for the third round was completed, with the Saints drawn away to Sheffield United. On 22 September, the draw for the fourth round was completed, with the Saints drawn away to Chelsea.

25 August 2021 Second round	Newport County	0–8	Southampton	Newport
19:45 BST		Report	Broja 9', 57'; Tella 25'; Walker-Peters 44'; Elyounoussi 48', 55', 90+1'; Redmond 69'	Stadium: Rodney Parade; Attendance: 7,002; Referee: Darren Drysdale

21 September 2021 Third round	Sheffield United	2–2 (2–4 p)	Southampton	Sheffield
19:45 BST	Stevens 8'; McBurnie 66'	Report	Diallo 23'; Salisu 53'	Stadium: Bramall Lane; Attendance: 8,934; Referee: John Brooks
	Penalties
	Norwood (penalty scored); Brewster (penalty missed); Osborn (penalty scored); McBurnie (penalty missed)		(penalty scored) Ward-Prowse; (penalty scored) Adams; (penalty missed) Broja; (penalty scored) Diallo; (penalty scored) Romeu

26 October 2021 Fourth round	Chelsea	1–1 (4–3 p)	Southampton	Fulham
19:45 BST	Havertz 44'	Report	Adams 47'	Stadium: Stamford Bridge; Attendance: 39,766; Referee: Kevin Friend
	Penalties
	Alonso (penalty scored); Mount (penalty missed); Hudson-Odoi (penalty scored); Chilwell (penalty scored); James (penalty scored)		(penalty scored) A. Armstrong; (penalty missed) Walcott; (penalty scored) Long; (penalty missed) Smallbone; (penalty scored) Romeu

== Squad statistics ==
As of 22 May 2022

No.	Pos.	Nat.	Name	League				FA Cup				EFL Cup				Total			
No.	Pos.	Nat.	Name	Apps.	Goals	Yellow card	Red card	Apps.	Goals	Yellow card	Red card	Apps.	Goals	Yellow card	Red card	Apps.	Goals	Yellow card	Red card
1	GK	(England)	Alex McCarthy	17	0	1	0	0	0	0	0	0	0	0	0	17	0	1	0
2	DF	(England)	Kyle Walker-Peters	29(3)	1	5	0	2(1)	1	1	0	2	1	0	0	33(4)	3	6	0
4	DF	(Brazil)	Lyanco	9(6)	0	2	0	1	0	0	0	2	0	1	0	12(6)	0	2	0
5	DF	(England)	Jack Stephens	9(2)	0	3	0	4	0	1	0	1	0	0	0	14(2)	0	4	0
6	MF	(Spain)	Oriol Romeu	34(2)	2	9	0	2(2)	0	0	0	1(1)	0	0	0	37(5)	2	9	0
7	FW	(Republic of Ireland)	Shane Long	3(10)	1	1	0	3(1)	1	0	0	0(2)	0	0	0	6(13)	2	1	0
8	MF	(England)	James Ward-Prowse	36	10	3	1	4	1	0	0	1(1)	0	0	0	41(1)	11	3	1
9	FW	(England)	Adam Armstrong	17(6)	2	1	0	3(1)	0	0	0	1	0	0	0	21(7)	2	1	0
10	FW	(Scotland)	Ché Adams	23(7)	7	0	0	0(1)	0	0	0	1(1)	1	0	0	24(9)	8	0	0
11	MF	(England)	Nathan Redmond	20(7)	1	0	0	1(2)	1	0	0	2	1	0	0	23(9)	3	0	0
13	GK	(Argentina)	Willy Caballero	2	0	1	0	2	0	0	0	0	0	0	0	4	0	1	0
15	DF	(France)	Romain Perraud	18(2)	0	3	0	2	1	1	0	1	0	0	0	21(2)	1	4	0
16	DF	(England)	Thierry Small	0	0	0	0	1	0	0	0	0	0	0	0	1	0	0	0
17	MF	(Scotland)	Stuart Armstrong	15(10)	2	1	0	2(2)	1	0	0	1	0	0	0	18(12)	3	1	0
18	FW	(Albania)	Armando Broja	21(11)	6	2	0	1(3)	1	0	0	2	2	0	0	24(14)	9	2	0
19	MF	(Mali)	Moussa Djenepo	5(7)	0	3	0	1(1)	0	0	0	2	0	1	0	8(8)	0	4	0
20	MF	(Republic of Ireland)	Will Smallbone	2(2)	0	0	0	1(1)	0	0	0	0(1)	0	0	0	3(4)	0	0	0
21	DF	(England)	Tino Livramento	25(3)	1	2	0	2(1)	0	0	0	0(1)	0	0	0	27(5)	1	2	0
22	DF	(Ghana)	Mohammed Salisu	33(1)	0	8	1	1	0	0	0	2	1	0	0	36(1)	1	8	1
23	MF	(England)	Nathan Tella	10(4)	0	2	0	1	0	0	0	3	1	0	0	14(4)	1	2	0
24	MF	(Norway)	Mohamed Elyounoussi	23(7)	4	4	0	1(1)	1	0	0	1	3	0	0	25(8)	8	4	0
27	MF	(France)	Ibrahima Diallo	10(13)	0	1	0	2(2)	0	1	0	3	1	2	0	15(15)	1	4	0
32	MF	(England)	Theo Walcott	5(4)	0	0	0	1	0	0	0	0(2)	0	0	0	6(6)	0	0	0
35	DF	(Poland)	Jan Bednarek	30(1)	4	10	0	1	0	0	0	1(1)	0	0	0	32(2)	4	10	0
41	GK	(England)	Harry Lewis	0	0	0	0	0	0	0	0	0	0	0	0	0	0	0	0
43	DF	(France)	Yan Valery	3(2)	0	0	0	3	0	1	1	3	0	0	0	9(2)	0	1	1
44	GK	(England)	Fraser Forster	19	0	1	0	2	0	0	0	3	0	1	0	24	0	2	0
45	MF	(England)	Tyler Dibling	0	0	0	0	0	0	0	0	0	0	0	0	0	0	0	0
48	MF	(England)	Kegs Chauke	0	0	0	0	0	0	0	0	0	0	0	0	0	0	0	0
53	FW	(Belgium)	Kazeem Olaigbe	0	0	0	0	0	0	0	0	0	0	0	0	0	0	0	0
Players with appearances who left during the season
14	FW	(Republic of Ireland)	Michael Obafemi	0	0	0	0	0	0	0	0	0(1)	0	0	0	0(1)	0	0	0

=== Most appearances ===
As of 22 May 2022

#	Pos.	Nat.	Name	League		FA Cup		EFL Cup		Total		
#	Pos.	Nat.	Name	Starts	Subs	Starts	Subs	Starts	Subs	Starts	Subs	Total
1	MF	(England)	James Ward-Prowse	36	0	4	0	1	1	41	1	42
1	MF	(Spain)	Oriol Romeu	34	2	2	2	1	1	37	5	42
3	FW	(Albania)	Armando Broja	21	11	1	3	2	0	24	14	38
4	DF	(Ghana)	Mohammed Salisu	33	1	1	0	2	0	36	1	37
4	DF	(England)	Kyle Walker-Peters	29	3	2	1	2	0	33	4	37
6	DF	(Poland)	Jan Bednarek	30	1	1	0	1	1	32	2	34
7	MF	(Norway)	Mohamed Elyounoussi	23	7	1	1	1	0	25	8	33
7	FW	(Scotland)	Ché Adams	23	7	0	1	1	1	24	9	33
9	DF	(England)	Tino Livramento	25	3	2	1	0	1	27	5	32
9	MF	(England)	Nathan Redmond	20	7	1	2	2	0	23	9	32

=== Top goalscorers ===
As of 22 May 2022

#	Pos.	Nat.	Name	League		FA Cup		EFL Cup		Total		
#	Pos.	Nat.	Name	Goals	Apps.	Goals	Apps.	Goals	Apps.	Goals	Apps.	GPG
1	MF	(England)	James Ward-Prowse	10	36	1	4	0	2	11	42	0.26
2	FW	(Albania)	Armando Broja	6	32	1	4	2	2	9	38	0.24
3	FW	(Scotland)	Ché Adams	7	30	0	1	1	2	8	33	0.24
3	MF	(Norway)	Mohamed Elyounoussi	4	30	1	2	3	1	8	33	0.24
5	DF	(Poland)	Jan Bednarek	4	31	0	1	0	2	4	34	0.12
6	MF	(Scotland)	Stuart Armstrong	2	25	1	4	0	1	3	30	0.10
6	MF	(England)	Nathan Redmond	1	27	1	3	1	2	3	32	0.09
6	DF	(England)	Kyle Walker-Peters	1	32	1	3	1	2	3	37	0.08
9	FW	(Republic of Ireland)	Shane Long	1	13	1	4	0	2	2	19	0.11
9	FW	(England)	Adam Armstrong	2	23	0	4	0	1	2	28	0.07
9	MF	(Spain)	Oriol Romeu	2	36	0	4	0	2	2	42	0.05
