= Sam Amo-Ameyaw =

English footballer (born 2006)

Personal information
- Full name: Samuel Christian Osaze Amo-Ameyaw
- Date of birth: 18 July 2006 (age 20)
- Place of birth: Hackney, England
- Height: 1.74 m (5 ft 9 in)
- Position: Winger

Team information
- Current team: Strasbourg
- Number: 7

Youth career
- –2022: Tottenham Hotspur
- 2022–2023: Southampton

Senior career*
Years	Team	Apps	(Gls)
2023–2025	Southampton	6	(0)
2025	→ Strasbourg (loan)	9	(2)
2025–	Strasbourg	32	(4)

International career^{‡}
2021–2022	England U16	11	(1)
2022–2023	England U17	10	(1)
2023–2024	England U18	13	(3)
2024–2025	England U19	11	(0)
2025–	England U20	1	(0)
2026–	England U21	5	(1)
- * Club domestic league appearances and goals as of 19:15, 17 October 2026 (UTC) ‡ National team caps and goals as of 21:14, 7 October 2026 (UTC)

Samuel Christian Osaze Amo-Ameyaw (born 18 July 2006) is an English professional footballer who plays as a winger for Ligue 1 club Strasbourg.

== Club career ==
=== Southampton ===
Amo-Ameyaw joined Southampton from Tottenham Hotspur in August 2022 as a sixteen-year-old, having reportedly turned down the offer of a scholarship contract with Spurs. Compensation payments owed to Spurs by Southampton were reported to be close to a £1 million deal for Amo-Ameyaw and his teammate Jayden Meghoma, who made the same journey. Commenting on the decision, Amo-Ameyaw said that he chose Southampton because of the clearer pathway to the first-team. He was part of the Southampton under-18 side which reached the semi-finals of the FA Youth Cup in April 2023.

Amo-Ameyaw made his Premier League debut on 28 May 2023 appearing as a second-half substitute for James Ward-Prowse as Southampton played a home match with Liverpool, which finished 4–4. At 16 years and 314 days, Amo-Ameyaw became the youngest-ever player to appear in the Premier League for Southampton. On 24 July 2023, Southampton announced Amo-Ameyaw had signed his first professional contract.

He scored his only goal for the club on 28 August 2024 in a 3–5 away victory against Cardiff City in the EFL Cup.

=== Strasbourg ===
On 3 February 2025, Amo-Ameyaw joined Ligue 1 side Strasbourg on loan for the remainder of the 2024–25 season, with an obligation to buy at the end of the season. On 26 June 2025, Strasbourg announced that the purchase option was exercised.

== International career ==
Born in England, Amo-Ameyaw is of Ghanaian descent. He has represented England at under-16 and under-17 level. He scored his first goal for the under-16 team in a 3–2 home victory against Belgium under-16s on 4 November 2021.

On 6 September 2023, Amo-Ameyaw made his England under-18 debut during a 2–0 defeat to France in Limoges.

In November 2023, Amo-Ameyaw was named in the England squad for the 2023 FIFA U-17 World Cup and scored in their opening game against New Caledonia. He also played in their next group games against Iran and Brazil. Amo-Ameyaw then started in their round of sixteen elimination against Uzbekistan.

On 4 September 2024, Amo-Ameyaw made his England U19 debut during a 2–2 draw with Italy in Croatia. He was an included in the squad for the 2025 UEFA European Under-19 Championship. Amo-Ameyaw made an appearance as a substitute in their opening game of the tournament against Norway and then started in the next group fixture which ended in a 5-5 draw with Germany.

On 5 September 2025, Amo-Ameyaw made his England U20 debut during a 2-1 defeat to Italy at the SMH Group Stadium.

On 27 March 2026, Amo-Ameyaw made his England U21 debut during a 1-1 2027 UEFA European Under-21 Championship qualification draw away to Andorra.

== Style of play ==
Described as being able to dribble with the ball "fluidly", Amo-Ameyaw was said to be adapting from a wider role in his first year at Southampton to a more central number 10 role.

== Career statistics ==
As of match played 17 October 2026

Appearances and goals by club, season and competition
Club	Season	League			National cup (Note: Includes FA Cup, Coupe de France)		League cup (Note: Includes EFL Cup)		Europe		Total	
Club	Season	Division	Apps	Goals	Apps	Goals	Apps	Goals	Apps	Goals	Apps	Goals
Southampton	2022–23	Premier League	1	0	0	0	0	0	—		1	0
Southampton	2023–24	Championship	3	0	3	0	1	0	—		7	0
Southampton	2024–25	Premier League	2	0	0	0	2	1	—		4	1
Southampton	Total		6	0	3	0	3	1	0	0	12	1
Strasbourg (loan)	2024–25	Ligue 1	9	2	1	0	—		—		10	2
Strasbourg	2025–26	Ligue 1	25	2	5	0	—		9 (Note: Appearances in UEFA Conference League)	0	39	2
Strasbourg	2026–27	Ligue 1	7	2	0	0	—		—		7	2
Strasbourg	Total		32	4	5	0	—		9	0	46	4
Career total			47	6	9	0	3	1	9	0	68	7

== Honours ==
England U18

- U18 Pinatar Super Cup: 2024
