= Tyler Dibling =

English footballer (born 2006)

Personal information
- Full name: Tyler-Jay Robert Dibling
- Date of birth: 17 February 2006 (age 20)
- Place of birth: Exeter, England
- Height: 1.86 m (6 ft 1 in)
- Position: Winger

Team information
- Current team: Everton
- Number: 20

Youth career
- Axminster Town
- 2011–2013: Millwey Rise
- 2012–2013: Southampton
- 2013–2014: Exeter City
- 2014–2022: Southampton
- 2022: Chelsea
- 2022–2023: Southampton

Senior career*
Years	Team	Apps	(Gls)
2023–2025	Southampton	35	(2)
2025–	Everton	18	(0)

International career^{‡}
2021–2022	England U16	4	(1)
2022–2023	England U17	15	(3)
2023	England U18	5	(0)
2024–2025	England U19	6	(1)
2024–	England U21	11	(1)
- * Club domestic league appearances and goals as of 06:03, 7 November 2026 (UTC) ‡ National team caps and goals as of 23:55, 6 October 2026 (UTC)

Tyler-Jay Robert Dibling (born 17 February 2006) is an English professional footballer who plays as a winger for Premier League club Everton.

== Club career ==
=== Early career ===
Born in Exeter, Dibling started his career with local side Axminster Town AFC, where his father Sam played for the men's team. He joined Millwey Rise FC at the age of five, spending two years with the youth side.

He joined Southampton in 2012, also spending a year with Exeter City at the age of seven, before signing a professional contract with The Saints in October 2021. In April 2022, he scored a hat-trick of near-identical goals in a Premier League 2 match against Newcastle United, with a video of the goals going viral.

Having been named on the bench for a Premier League game against Brentford, in which he did not feature, Dibling drew attention from Newcastle United and Chelsea.

He joined the latter in July 2022, after ten years with Southampton, with the promise of a professional contract once he turned seventeen. However, after failing to settle at Chelsea, making only two appearances for the club's under-18 side, he returned to Southampton in September 2022, reportedly because of "homesickness".

=== Southampton ===
Dibling signed a scholarship deal with Southampton on 17 September 2022, stating that the club felt like a "second home" to him. He was seen as one of the brightest prospects in Southampton's academy. On 22 February 2023, Dibling signed his first professional contract. On 18 December 2023, he signed a new contract, keeping him at the club until 2026.

Dibling made his first professional appearance on 8 August 2023 in a 3–1 defeat to Gillingham in the EFL Cup, replacing Jayden Meghoma in the 85th minute. On 13 January 2024, he made his first league appearance for the club in a 4–0 victory against Sheffield Wednesday, coming on as a substitute for Ryan Fraser in the 88th minute.

On 17 August 2024, Dibling made his first Premier League appearance in a 1–0 away defeat against Newcastle United after he replaced Joe Aribo in the 70th minute. On 21 September, he scored his first professional goal in a 1–1 draw against Ipswich Town.

=== Everton ===
On 25 August 2025, Dibling joined Everton on a four-year contract, for a reported transfer fee of an initial £35 million plus £5m in potential add-ons.

== International career ==
Dibling has represented England at the under-16, under-17 and under-18 levels. On 17 May 2023, Dibling was named in the England squad for the 2023 UEFA European Under-17 Championship. He made his England under-18 debut on 6 September 2023 during a 2–0 defeat to France in Limoges. On 2 November 2023, Dibling was included in the England squad for the 2023 FIFA U-17 World Cup. He scored in their opening group game against New Caledonia.

On 4 September 2024, Dibling made his England U19 debut during a 2–2 draw to Italy. On 8 November 2024, he was named in the England U21 squad to face Spain and the Netherlands in friendlies. He made his England U21 debut on 15 November 2024 in a 0–0 draw with Spain.

== Career statistics ==
As of match played 6 November 2026

Appearances and goals by club, season and competition
Club	Season	League			FA Cup		EFL Cup		Other		Total	
Club	Season	Division	Apps	Goals	Apps	Goals	Apps	Goals	Apps	Goals	Apps	Goals
Southampton U23	2022–23	—			—		—		2 (Note: Appearances in EFL Trophy)	0	2	0
Southampton	2023–24	Championship	1	0	3	0	1	0	—		5	0
Southampton	2024–25	Premier League	33	2	2	2	3	0	—		38	4
Southampton	2025–26	Championship	1	0	—		0	0	—		1	0
Southampton	Total		35	2	5	2	4	0	—		44	4
Everton	2025–26	Premier League	14	0	1	0	2	0	—		17	0
Everton	2026–27	Premier League	4	0	0	0	3	0	—		7	0
Everton	Total		18	0	1	0	5	0	—		24	0
Career total			53	2	6	2	9	0	2	0	70	4

== Honours ==
England U18

- U18 Pinatar Super Cup: 2024
