= Will Smallbone =

Irish footballer (born 2000)

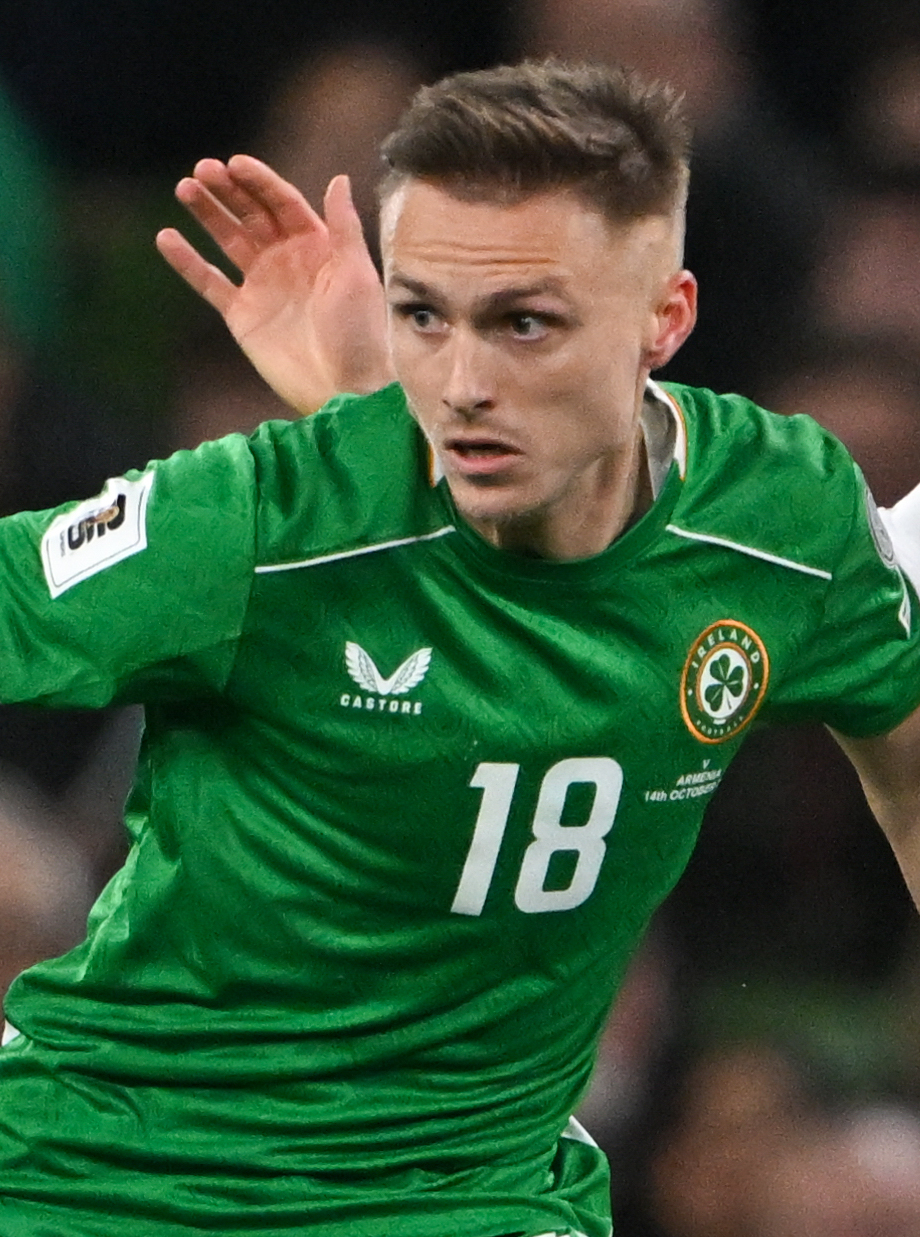
- Smallbone with the Republic of Ireland in 2025

Personal information
- Full name: William Anthony Patrick Smallbone
- Date of birth: 21 February 2000 (age 26)
- Place of birth: Basingstoke, England
- Height: 6 ft 0 in (1.83 m)
- Position: Central midfielder

Team information
- Current team: Leicester City
- Number: 12

Youth career
- 2008–2019: Southampton

Senior career*
Years	Team	Apps	(Gls)
2019–2026	Southampton	77	(7)
2022–2023	→ Stoke City (loan)	43	(3)
2025–2026	→ Millwall (loan)	10	(0)
2026–	Leicester City	4	(0)

International career^{‡}
2017	Republic of Ireland U18	1	(0)
2018–2019	Republic of Ireland U19	5	(2)
2020–2022	Republic of Ireland U21	8	(3)
2023–	Republic of Ireland	15	(0)
- * Club domestic league appearances and goals as of 06:27, 2 November 2026 (UTC) ‡ National team caps and goals as of 21:55, 14 October 2025 (UTC)

William Anthony Patrick Smallbone (born 21 February 2000) is a professional footballer who plays as a central midfielder for EFL League One club Leicester City. Born in England, he plays for the Republic of Ireland national team.

Smallbone is a product of the Southampton academy and made his professional debut for the club in January 2020. He had loan spells with Stoke City and Millwall. Smallbone has represented the Republic of Ireland at youth and full international level.

== Club career ==
=== Southampton ===
==== 2017–2022 ====
On 21 February 2017, Smallbone signed a professional contract with Southampton. He made his professional debut for Southampton in a 2–0 FA Cup victory over Huddersfield Town on 4 January 2020, scoring the opening goal. On 22 February 2020, Smallbone went on to make his Premier League debut in a 2–0 victory over Aston Villa.

Having just started to appear regularly for the first team, on 16 January 2021, Smallbone suffered an anterior cruciate ligament injury in a 2–0 defeat at Leicester. As a result, he was expected to be out of action for up to six months. On 26 October 2021, Smallbone made his first professional appearance since his injury, replacing Stuart Armstrong in Southampton's defeat to Chelsea after a penalty shootout in the EFL Cup.

==== 2022–2025 ====
On 23 July 2022, Smallbone joined Stoke City on a season-long loan. He scored his first goal for Stoke in a 2–0 win at Preston North End on 15 October 2022. Smallbone was a regular under Alex Neil in 2022–23, making 46 appearances, scoring three goals as Stoke finished in 16th position.

On 28 August 2023, Smallbone signed a three-year contract extension with Southampton. He scored his first league goal for the club on 30 September 2023 in a 3–1 victory against Leeds United. On 17 May 2024, Smallbone scored the opening goal in a 3–1 victory against West Bromwich Albion in the second leg of the EFL Championship play-off semi-final, helping to secure his team's place in the final. Later that month, on 26 May, he provided an assist for Adam Armstrong in a 1–0 victory against Leeds United in the final, ensuring his club's promotion to the Premier League.

During a 3–2 home defeat against Leicester City on 19 October 2024, Smallbone made his return from an injury after he came off the bench, but manager Russell Martin feared he "tweaked" his hamstring during the game. Martin later revealed that Smallbone was expected to be sidelined for "a little bit of time" after he battled through the pain barrier to play against Leicester City. On 8 March 2025, he scored his first Premier League goal in a 3–1 defeat against Liverpool.

==== 2025–2026 ====
On 1 September 2025, Smallbone joined Millwall on a season-long loan. He made his first appearance for the club on 22 September in a 1–0 victory against Watford after he replaced Aidomo Emakhu in the 67th minute. After suffering a hamstring injury against Stoke City on 21 October, Smallbone was ruled out for several months. On 7 March 2026, he returned from injury in a 3–1 away victory against Hull City. At the end of March, Smallbone suffered another injury, and manager Alex Neil confirmed he was sidelined for a couple of weeks. Due to injuries, Smallbone made ten appearances for the club in all competitions. Smallbone was released from Southampton following the conclusion of the 2025–26 season.

=== Leicester City ===
On 1 October 2026, Smallbone joined Leicester City on a three-year contract. He made his debut for the club on 20 October in a 4–0 away victory against Bromley.

== International career ==
Smallbone qualified to play for the Republic of Ireland through his Kilkenny-born mother. Smallbone made his debut for Republic of Ireland U21s against Italy U21s in October 2020. On 3 June 2022, he scored his first goals for the Republic of Ireland U21 team, scoring a brace in a 3–0 win over Bosnia and Herzegovina U21 at Tallaght Stadium. He followed that up by scoring a volley from outside the box three days later, to open the scoring in an eventual 3–1 win over Montenegro U21.

In November 2022, Smallbone was included in Stephen Kenny's senior squad for forthcoming friendlies. He made his debut on 22 March 2023 in a friendly match against Latvia, which ended in a 3–2 victory. He won Player of the Match award for his display against Latvia.

== Personal life ==
Smallbone was diagnosed with alopecia in 2021 whilst recovering from his ACL injury. In December 2022, he became an ambassador for Alopecia UK.

== Career statistics ==
=== Club ===
As of match played 10 November 2026

Appearances and goals by club, season and competition
Club	Season	League			FA Cup		EFL Cup		Other		Total	
Club	Season	Division	Apps	Goals	Apps	Goals	Apps	Goals	Apps	Goals	Apps	Goals
Southampton U21	2016–17	—			—		—		1 (Note: Appearance(s) in EFL Trophy)	0	1	0
Southampton U21	2017–18	—			—		—		1	0	1	0
Southampton U21	2018–19	—			—		—		3	0	3	0
Southampton U21	2019–20	—			—		—		1	0	1	0
Southampton U21	2021–22	—			—		—		1	0	1	0
Southampton U21	Total		—		—		—		7	0	7	0
Southampton	2019–20	Premier League	9	0	1	1	0	0	—		10	1
Southampton	2020–21	Premier League	3	0	0	0	0	0	—		3	0
Southampton	2021–22	Premier League	4	0	2	0	1	0	—		7	0
Southampton	2023–24	Championship	43	6	4	0	0	0	3 (Note: Appearances in Championship play-offs)	1	50	7
Southampton	2024–25	Premier League	18	1	2	0	0	0	—		20	1
Southampton	Total		77	7	9	1	1	0	3	1	90	9
Stoke City (loan)	2022–23	Championship	43	3	2	0	1	0	—		46	3
Millwall (loan)	2025–26	Championship	10	0	0	0	0	0	—		10	0
Leicester City	2026–27	League One	4	0	0	0	—		1	1	5	1
Career total			134	10	11	1	2	0	11	2	158	13

=== International ===
As of match played 14 October 2025

Appearances and goals by national team and year
National team	Year	Apps	Goals
Republic of Ireland	2023	5	0
Republic of Ireland	2024	6	0
Republic of Ireland	2025	4	0
Total		15	0

== Honours ==
Southampton

- EFL Championship play-offs: 2024
