= Yukinari Sugawara =

Japanese footballer (born 2000)

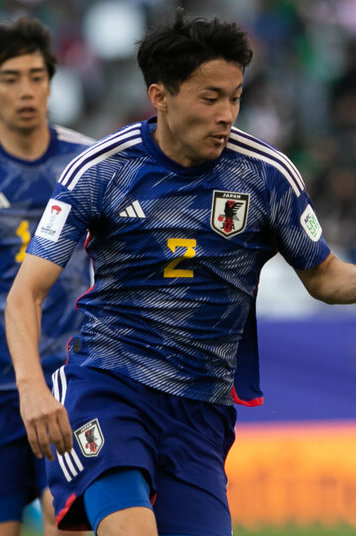
- Sugawara playing for Japan at the 2023 AFC Asian Cup

Personal information
- Full name: Yukinari Sugawara
- Date of birth: 28 June 2000 (age 26)
- Place of birth: Toyokawa, Aichi, Japan
- Height: 1.79 m (5 ft 10 in)
- Positions: Right-back; right wing-back

Team information
- Current team: Cagliari (on loan from Southampton)
- Number: 28

Youth career
- 2007–2012: AS Laranja Toyokawa
- 2013–2018: Nagoya Grampus

Senior career*
Years	Team	Apps	(Gls)
2018–2020	Nagoya Grampus	13	(0)
2019–2020	→ Jong AZ (loan)	7	(0)
2019–2020	→ AZ (loan)	16	(2)
2020–2021	Jong AZ	5	(1)
2020–2024	AZ	119	(10)
2024–	Southampton	32	(1)
2025–2026	→ Werder Bremen (loan)	31	(0)
2026–	→ Cagliari (loan)	6	(0)

International career^{‡}
	Japan U17	12	(1)
2019	Japan U20	7	(0)
2019	Japan U23	2	(0)
2020–	Japan	26	(2)
Medal record
Representing Japan
AFC U-19 Championship
Bronze medal – third place	2018 Indonesia
- * Club domestic league appearances and goals as of 06:04, 1 November 2026 (UTC) ‡ National team caps and goals as of 16:05, 30 14 November 2026 (UTC)

Yukinari Sugawara (菅原 由勢, Sugawara Yukinari; born 28 June 2000) is a Japanese professional footballer who plays as a right-back or right wing-back for Serie A club Cagliari, on loan from EFL Championship club Southampton and the Japan national team.

Sugawara began his senior career at Nagoya Grampus. In 2019, he joined AZ on loan before joining the club permanently in 2020. Sugawara moved to English club Southampton in 2024. He spent the 2025–26 season on loan at Werder Bremen. Sugawara has represented his country at youth and full international level.

== Club career ==
=== Nagoya Grampus ===
On 23 February 2018, it was announced that Nagoya Grampus had registered Sugawara as a player. Sugawara made his debut the following day, the opening day of the 2018 season, in a match against Gamba Osaka. At 17 years, 7 months, and 27 days, Sugawara's starting appearance in the J1 League opening match was the second youngest record in history (the youngest being Junichi Inamoto at 17 years and 6 months). On 6 April 2018, Sugawara signed his first professional contract with Nagoya Grampus, the youngest in the club's history to sign a professional deal, at 17 years and 10 months.

==== Loan to AZ ====
Sugawara joined Eredivisie club AZ on 21 June 2019 on a season-long loan. He made his first-team debut on 25 July, as a 59th-minute substitute during AZ's 0–0 home draw against BK Häcken in the second qualifying round of the Europa League. At AZ he was mainly utilised as a right back, where he competed with the older Jonas Svensson, and was set to become his future successor. On 4 August 2019, Sugawara started in the home match against Fortuna Sittard and scored the final goal in the 84th minute, to make it 4–0 after preliminary work by Calvin Stengs. Both in the league and group stage of the 2019–20 UEFA Europa League, Sugawara was a regular rotational player during the season, while also making some appearances for the reserve team of Jong AZ in the second-tier Eerste Divisie. During this season he played 16 league games in which he scored two goals.

=== AZ ===
On 23 February 2020, it was announced that Sugawara would sign a five-year contract to join AZ permanently from 1 June 2020. He was awarded by the Eredivisie in January 2022 and August 2023.

In October 2023, he became the record-holder for the highest number of European appearances for AZ, reaching his 47th game in European competitions during a match against Aston Villa.

=== Southampton ===
On 14 July 2024, Sugawara signed for Premier League club Southampton on a four-year contract. He became the fourth Japanese in history to sign with the club, after Tadanari Lee, Maya Yoshida and Takumi Minamino. On 17 August 2024, Sugawara made his debut for the club in a 1–0 away defeat against Newcastle United. He scored his first goal for the club on 31 August 2024 in a 3–1 away defeat against Brentford.

==== Werder Bremen (loan) ====
On 26 August 2025, Sugawara joined Werder Bremen on a season-long loan. The contract includes an option to buy Sugawara at the end of the season. He made his debut for the club on 30 August in a 3–3 draw with Bayer Leverkusen. On 9 May 2026, Sugawara was shown a red card for a foul on Bazoumana Touré after a VAR review by referee Sören Storks.

==== Cagliari (loan) ====
On 1 September 2026, Sugawara joined Cagliari on a season-long loan.

== Playing style ==
Sugawara is an attack-minded right-back whose game is characterised by a high work rate, overlapping runs and frequent crossing from the right flank. He often advances towards the byline before delivering crosses, and can also make diagonal runs into the penalty area. A 2023 scouting analysis of his performances for AZ Alkmaar described him as a high-positioned full-back who produced a high volume of crosses, while relying more on off-the-ball movement than on progressive ball-carrying. He has also described himself as a dynamic, running-oriented player who looks to reach the byline, cross or drive into the box.

Defensively, the same AZ-period analysis identified one-on-one duels, both on the ground and in the air, as areas in which he was less effective than in attack. It recorded relatively low tackling and aerial-duel figures, although it also noted that AZ's possession-oriented style meant that he was not required to defend constantly.

== Personal life ==
Sugawara was born on 28 June 2000 in Toyokawa, Aichi Prefecture, Japan. He began playing football during kindergarten after being invited by a friend and joined the local youth club AS Laranja Toyokawa. He later entered the youth system of Nagoya Grampus, progressing through the club's youth teams before making his senior debut as a teenager.

In an interview published by the city of Toyokawa, Sugawara described himself as sociable and approachable, saying that his personality had remained largely unchanged since childhood. After moving to the Netherlands in 2019, he made a concerted effort to learn English and everyday Dutch in order to communicate more effectively with his teammates and adapt to European football.

== International career ==
Sugawara represented Japan at the 2017 FIFA U-17 World Cup. He made his debut with the senior Japan national team in a friendly 0–0 tie with Cameroon on 9 October 2020. In March 2023, Sugawara made his first start for Japan against Uruguay. In September of the same year, he provided the assist for the first goal against Germany and was also the starting point for the second goal.

On 15 May 2026, Sugawara was selected in the 26-man squad for the 2026 FIFA World Cup.

== Career statistics ==
=== Club ===
As of match played 27 October 2026

Appearances and goals by club, season and competition
Club	Season	League			National cup (Note: Includes Emperor's Cup, KNVB Cup, FA Cup)		League cup (Note: Includes J.League Cup, EFL Cup)		Continental		Total	
Club	Season	Division	Apps	Goals	Apps	Goals	Apps	Goals	Apps	Goals	Apps	Goals
Nagoya Grampus	2018	J1 League	13	0	2	0	4	0	—		19	0
Nagoya Grampus	2019	J1 League	0	0	0	0	6	0	—		6	0
Nagoya Grampus	Total		13	0	2	0	10	0	—		25	0
Jong AZ	2019–20	Eerste Divisie	7	0	0	0	—		—		7	0
Jong AZ	2020–21	Eerste Divisie	5	1	0	0	—		—		5	1
Jong AZ	Total		12	1	0	0	—		—		12	1
AZ (loan)	2019–20	Eredivisie	16	2	1	0	—		11 (Note: Appearances in UEFA Europa League)	1	28	3
AZ	2020–21	Eredivisie	25	2	1	0	—		5 (Note: Two appearances in UEFA Champions League, three appearances in UEFA Europa League)	0	31	2
AZ	2021–22	Eredivisie	33	1	4	0	—		8 (Note: Appearances in UEFA Europa Conference League)	0	45	1
AZ	2022–23	Eredivisie	31	3	2	0	—		14	1	47	4
AZ	2023–24	Eredivisie	30	4	2	0	—		10	0	42	4
AZ	Total		119	10	9	0	—		37	1	165	11
Southampton	2024–25	Premier League	30	1	0	0	2	0	—		32	1
Southampton	2025–26	Championship	2	0	—		1	0	—		3	0
Southampton	2026–27	Championship	0	0	0	0	0	0	—		0	0
Southampton	Total		32	1	0	0	3	0	—		35	1
Werder Bremen (loan)	2025–26	Bundesliga	31	0	0	0	—		—		31	0
Cagliari (loan)	2026–27	Serie A	6	0	0	0	—		—		6	0
Career total			229	14	12	0	13	0	48	2	306	16

=== International ===
As of match played 14 November 2026

Appearances and goals by national team and year
National team	Year	Apps	Goals
Japan	2020	1	0
Japan	2023	7	1
Japan	2024	6	1
Japan	2025	4	0
Japan	2026	8	0
Total		26	2

Scores and results list Japan's goal tally first, score column indicates score after each Sugawara goal.

List of international goals scored by Yukinari Sugawara
No.	Date	Venue	Opponent	Score	Result	Competition
1	21 November 2023	Prince Abdullah Al Faisal Stadium, Jeddah, Saudi Arabia	Syria	4–0	5–0	2026 FIFA World Cup qualification
2	15 November 2024	Gelora Bung Karno Stadium, Jakarta, Indonesia	Indonesia	4–0	4–0	2026 FIFA World Cup qualification

== Honours ==
Japan U19

- AFC U-19 Championship third place: 2018

Individual

- Eredivisie Talent of the Month: January 2022
- Eredivisie Team of the Month: January 2022, March 2023, August 2023, September 2023, October 2023
- Eredivisie Team of the Calendar Year: 2023
- JPFA Awards Best XI: 2024

Records

- Most appearances for AZ in UEFA club competitions
