= Southampton F.C. Under-21s and Academy =

Coordinates: 50°53′17″N 1°27′38″W

Southampton F.C. Under-21s and Academy or Saints U21s and Academy is the youth organisation run by Southampton F.C. to encourage and develop young footballers in the south of England. Renowned players including Gareth Bale, Theo Walcott, and Alan Shearer began their careers at this academy.

The team is made up of under-21 and academy players, is effectively Southampton's second-string side, but is limited to three outfield players and one goalkeeper over the age of 21 per game following the introduction of new regulations from the 2012–13 season. They play in Premier League 2, Division 2. The team also competes in the EFL Trophy, Premier League International Cup, Premier League Cup and the Hampshire Senior Cup. The under-18 players among other younger age groups make up the Academy team and play in the Premier League U18 First Division, South, Premier League U18 Cup and the FA Youth Cup.

Home fixtures are contested at A.F.C. Totton's Testwood Stadium with some fixtures being held at St. Mary's. Some games are played at the club's training facilities at Staplewood in Long Lane, Marchwood, Southampton if required. Since November 2025, the Under 21s have been managed by Adam Lallana, while since June 2025, the Under 18s have been managed by Andrew Surman.

== Age categories ==
- Under 21 (professionals)
- Under 18
- Under 16
- Under 15
- Under 14
- Under 13
- Under 12
- Under 11
- Under 10
- Under 9
- Under 8

== International players ==
Amongst the players who passed through the Saints Academy and went on to represent their country since the turn of the Millennium are:

- (Northern Ireland) Chris Baird
- (Benin) Richard Bakary
- (Wales) Gareth Bale
- (Republic of Ireland) Leon Best
- (Poland) Bartosz Białkowski
- (Antigua and Barbuda) Dexter Blackstock
- (Northern Ireland) Alan Blayney
- (Brunei) Faiq Jefri Bolkiah
- (England) Wayne Bridge
- (England) Calum Chambers
- (Wales) Arron Davies
- (Togo) Yoann Folly
- (England) Danny Ings
- (Wales) Lloyd Isgrove
- (Canada) Alfie Jones
- (England) Adam Lallana
- (Grenada) Joshua Lett
- (Australia) Scott McDonald
- (Republic of Ireland) David McGoldrick
- (England) Tyrone Mings
- (Uganda) Bevis Mugabi
- (Germany) Jamal Musiala
- (Republic of Ireland) Michael Obafemi
- (England) Alex Oxlade-Chamberlain
- (Latvia) Andrejs Perepļotkins
- (Wales) Lewis Price
- (Northern Ireland) Ben Reeves
- (England) Luke Shaw
- (Republic of Ireland) Will Smallbone
- (Finland) Tim Sparv
- (Nigeria) Nathan Tella
- (Trinidad and Tobago) Jake Thomson
- (Tunisia) Yan Valery
- (England) Theo Walcott
- (England) James Ward-Prowse
- (England) Ben White
- (Malaysia) Stuart Wilkin

In the past, prior to the establishment of the academy, the Southampton youth system has produced other international players, including Terry Paine, Martin Chivers, Steve Williams, Mick Channon, Matthew Le Tissier, Kevin Phillips, Alan Shearer and Dennis Wise.

Four former Saints academy players featured in the England Under-21 match against Montenegro on 7 September 2007: Martin Cranie and Theo Walcott both started (with Walcott setting up the second goal) whilst Dexter Blackstock and Andrew Surman came on as second-half substitutes, with Surman scoring the final goal in a 3–0 victory, tapping the ball home in stoppage time from a knock-down by Blackstock.

In England's international friendly against Denmark on 5 March 2014, three graduates of the Southampton F.C. Academy appeared as second-half substitutes: Luke Shaw (making his debut), Adam Lallana and Alex Oxlade-Chamberlain.

== Present structure ==
Andy Goldie is the current Academy Director, having joined the club from Swansea City in July 2023. His assistant, Duncan Fearnhead, is the Academy Manager, having previously held the same role at Accrington Stanley. The current academy set up has teams at all age groups from Under 8s all the way through to the professional U21 team, employing large number of coaches and educational staff. Academy players from the age of 16 up until the age of 18 are often looked after by Host Families within the local area.

The aim of the Southampton academy is to "...produce Premiership class players..."

Southampton has regularly reached the latter stages of the FA Youth Cup, as well as being successful in the FA Premier Academy League championship. In the 2010–2011 season the U18s were only just "...Pipped to the Title..." by one point on the last day of the season of the Group A league. Southampton had to win and Fulham had to draw or lose for Southampton to come top. After winning 1–3 away to Coventry City the U18s were dismayed to discover Fulham had come back from being 0–3 down versus Leicester City to win 5–3.

The academy has joined up with local college Sparsholt College to try to give those footballers who have missed out on a scholarship the opportunity to remain in the game and train and play matches with the Southampton Academy.

In May 2013, Andre Villas-Boas, manager of Tottenham Hotspur praised the Southampton Academy for its ability to produce star players, describing it as "a great school of development" and comparing it to the Sporting Lisbon's youth academy in Portugal.

In April 2015, a Southampton U21 side won the U21 Premier League Cup, defeating a Blackburn Rovers U21 side in the two-legged final at St Mary's Stadium in front of more than 12,000 fans. Goals from Ryan Seager and Sam Gallagher cancelled out a Matt Targett own goal to give Southampton a 2–1 victory after extra time to win the second edition of the cup.

In September 2020, Southampton revamped their Under-23s programme to 'enhance the pathway into the first team for its younger players.' A 'structure and philosophical overhaul' saw the Under-23s side become a B team. The new B team will mirror the training programmes, coaching and style of play of the first team. Training and fixtures, where possible, will also be organised so it does not clash with the first team so the first team manager and coaches can watch the side train or play and also take part in coaching sessions. The side will still continue to participate in the same competitions as before the revamp.

Under new club Director of Football Matt Crocker, individual player coaches have been brought-in to try and improve players coming through the academy. Lee Skyrme was appointed B team individual player coach in 2021, while Mikey Harris was appointed in the same role for the U18s in the same year. Harris was replaced in 2022 by Pete Haynes, with Harris having been promoted to U18 head coach.

== Under-21s ==
Southampton Under-21s
- Full name: Southampton Football Club Under-21 team
- Nickname: The Saints
- Ground: Testwood Stadium, Totton, Southampton and Silverlake Stadium (select competition games)
- Manager: Adam Lallana (Under-21 team)
- League: Premier League 2
- 2025–26: Premier League 2, 6th Round of 16
- Website: http://www.southamptonfc.com/
Home colours	Away colours	Third colours

Players (excluding scholars) who will qualify as Under-21 team players in season 2026–27 (i.e. born on or after 1 January 2006) and who are outside the first team squad.

As of 1 September 2025

- Squad numbers represent numbers given to players for first team and EFL Trophy matches only.
- ± Denotes a player on an 'extended scholarship'.
- * Denotes a player who is overage (born before 1 January 2005) and outside of the first team squad.

Note: Flags indicate national team as defined under FIFA eligibility rules; some limited exceptions apply. Players may hold more than one non-FIFA nationality.

No.	Pos.	Nation	Player
—	DF	ENG	Hansel Adjei-Afriyie
—	DF	ENG	Nathanael Boot
—	DF	ENG	Max Fry
—	DF	ENG	Davon Gbajumo
39	DF	FRA	Joachim Kayi Sanda
—	DF	SCO	Rory Whittaker
—	MF	ENG	Brandon Charles
—	MF	ENG	Aston Daley
—	MF	ENG	Harry Gathercole
—	MF	ENG	Sutura Kakay

No.	Pos.	Nation	Player
—	MF	ENG	Korban McMullan
—	MF	WAL	Oli Newman
—	MF	ENG	Thierry Rohart-Brown
53	MF	ENG	Barnaby Williams
—	FW	ENG	Lewis Bailey
—	FW	ENG	Baylee Dipepa
40	FW	ENG	Princewill Ehibhatiomhan
—	FW	ESP	Sufianu Sillah Dibaga
—	FW	NGR	Leo Umeh

=== Out on loan ===
Note: Flags indicate national team as defined under FIFA eligibility rules; some limited exceptions apply. Players may hold more than one non-FIFA nationality.

No.	Pos.	Nation	Player
—	GK	ENG	Dylan Moody (on loan at AFC Totton until 6 November 2026)
—	DF	ENG	Tommy Dobson-Ventura (on loan at Eastleigh until end of season)
—	DF	ENG	Jayden Moore (on loan at Worthing until end of season)

No.	Pos.	Nation	Player
—	MF	MLI	Issa Tounkara (on loan at Valenciennes until end of season)
—	MF	FRA	Daouda Traoré (on loan at Le Mans until end of season)

== Under-21s honours ==
=== Leagues ===
- Premier League 2, Division 2
  - Champions: 2022–23
  - 2nd (promoted via playoffs): 2018–19

=== Cups ===
- U21 Premier League Cup
  - Winners: 2014–15
- Southampton Senior Cup
  - Winners: 2017–18
- South Shields International Tournament
  - Winners: 2018–19

== Under-18s ==
Southampton Under-18s
- Full name: Southampton Football Club (Under-18s)
- Nickname: The Saints
- Ground: Staplewood Campus, Long Lane, Marchwood, Southampton
- Manager: Andrew Surman (Under-18s)
- League: U18 Premier League South
- 2025–26: U18 Premier League South, 7th
- Website: http://www.southamptonfc.com/
Home colours	Away colours

As of 8 July 2026

=== Academy 2nd Years 2026–2027 ===
Note: Flags indicate national team as defined under FIFA eligibility rules; some limited exceptions apply. Players may hold more than one non-FIFA nationality.

No.	Pos.	Nation	Player
—	GK	WAL	Oscar Abbotson * (DoB 05.01.2009)
—	GK	IRL	Xander Grieves * (DoB 13.04.2009)
—	GK	ENG	Cale Richardson (DoB xx.xx.xxxx)
—	DF	SCO	Harris Afzal * (DoB xx.xx.xxxx)
—	DF	NIR	Calum Anderson * (DoB 09.01.2009)
—	DF	ENG	Lewis Day (DoB 31.10.2008)
—	DF	NIR	Broghan Sewell * (DoB 13.10.2008)
—	DF	SCO	Jake Vallance * (DoB 10.10.2008)

No.	Pos.	Nation	Player
—	MF	ALB	Klevi Bariami (DoB 10.01.2009)
—	MF	ENG	Wyatt Comley (DoB xx.xx.xxxx)
—	MF	ENG	Walter Nutter * (DoB 28.10.2008)
—	MF	ENG	Fabio Sainsbury (DoB xx.xx.xxxx)
—	FW	ENG	Joaquin Borekull Urrutia (DoB 24.11.2008)
—	FW	NIR	Luke Hawe * (DoB 30.04.2009)
—	FW	ENG	Junior Kuzanga (DoB xx.xx.xxxx)

- * = Professional contracts

=== Academy 1st Years 2026–2027 ===
Note: Flags indicate national team as defined under FIFA eligibility rules; some limited exceptions apply. Players may hold more than one non-FIFA nationality.

No.	Pos.	Nation	Player
—	GK	ENG	Hadley Clark (DoB xx.xx.xxxx)
—	GK	IRL	George Moloney (DoB 17.11.2009)
—	DF	ENG	Bobby Martin (DoB 24.06.2010)
—	DF	WAL	George Robinson (DoB 29.10.2009)
—	DF	ENG	George Wells (DoB xx.xx.xxxx)
—	MF	ENG	Kynan Duffy (DoB 14.01.2010)

No.	Pos.	Nation	Player
—	MF	ENG	Tyler Lemon (DoB 13.11.2009)
—	MF	MAR	Yunus Linton * (DoB xx.xx.xxxx)
—	MF	ENG	Max Little (DoB 01.09.2009)
—	MF	TTO	Archie Lovatt (DoB xx.xx.xxxx)
—	MF	ENG	Marley Parry (DoB xx.xx.xxxx)
—	FW	ENG	Jude Daniels (DoB 18.09.2009)

- * = Professional contracts

== Under-18s honours ==
=== Leagues ===
- U18 Premier League, Division 1
  - Champions (South Group), National runners-up: 2021–22

=== Cups ===
- FA Youth Cup
  - Runners-up: 2004–05

== Staff ==
Academy Leads

- Academy Director: Andy Goldie
- Academy Manager: Duncan Fearnhead
- Head of Academy Coaching: Ricky King
- Head of Academy Recruitment: Chris Robinson
- Head of Academy Performance: Tom Sturdy
- Head of Player Strategy: Olly Lancashire
- Head of Group Talent Development: Nick Davies
- Player Transition Coach: Dean Wilkins

Under-21 / Under-18 management

- U21 Coach: Adam Lallana
- U21 Assistant Coach: Matthew Etherington
- U21 Goalkeeping Coach: James Granger
- U21 Analyst: Ollie Dennett
- U21 Physical Performance Coach: Jack Baldwin
- U18 Coach: Andrew Surman
- U18 Assistant Coach: Callum Martin

== Academy graduates (2000–present) ==
A number of players from the Southampton F.C. Academy have gone on to have careers in professional football, whether at Southampton or at other clubs. The following is a list of players who have made their Southampton first-team debuts since the turn of the millennium. Players who have represented Southampton in only the EFL Trophy are not included in this list. Academy graduates who still play for Southampton, including those that are currently out on loan to other clubs, are highlighted in green. Where players have made their debut in the same fixture, they are sorted alphabetically by surname.

As of 21 November 2026

Player	Position	Southampton appearances	Southampton goals	Current club	Born	International honours	Debut	Manager
Ryan Ashford	DF	1	0	Retired	(England) Honiton		Age 18 vs. Mansfield Town, League Cup, 26 September 2000	Glenn Hoddle
Scott McDonald	FW	3	0	Retired	(Australia) Melbourne	Australia	Age 18 vs. Brighton & Hove Albion, League Cup, 11 September 2001	Stuart Gray
Chris Baird	DF	79	3	Retired	(Northern Ireland) Rasharkin	Northern Ireland	Age 21 vs. Aston Villa, Premier League, 22 March 2003	Gordon Strachan
Kevin Phillips	FW	73	26	Retired	(England) Hitchin	England	Age 30 vs. Leicester City, Premier League, 16 August 2003	Gordon Strachan
Léandre Griffit	MF	8	2	Retired	(France) Maubeuge	France U21	Age 19 vs. Blackburn Rovers, Premier League, 25 October 2003	Gordon Strachan
Yoann Folly	MF	18	0	Retired	(France) Paris	Togo	Age 18 vs. Tottenham Hotspur, Premier League, 27 March 2004	Paul Sturrock
Martin Cranie	DF	25	0	Retired	(England) Yeovil	England U21	Age 17 vs. Chelsea, Premier League, 1 May 2004	Paul Sturrock
Alan Blayney	GK	4	0	Retired	(Northern Ireland) Belfast	Northern Ireland	Age 22 vs. Newcastle United, Premier League, 12 May 2004	Paul Sturrock
Leon Best	FW	17	4	Retired	(England) Nottingham	Republic of Ireland	Age 18 vs. Newcastle United, Premier League, 19 September 2004	Steve Wigley
Dexter Blackstock	FW	36	9	Retired	(England) Oxford	Antigua and Barbuda	Age 18 vs. Everton, Premier League, 16 October 2004	Steve Wigley
Theo Walcott	MF/FW	82	10	Retired	(England) Stanmore	England	Age 16 vs. Wolverhampton Wanderers, Football League Championship, 6 August 2005	Harry Redknapp
Dennis Wise	DF/MF	12	1	Retired	(England) Kensington	England	Age 38 vs. Wolverhampton Wanderers, Football League Championship, 6 August 2005	Harry Redknapp
Nathan Dyer	MF	66	3	Retired	(England) Trowbridge		Age 17 vs. Southend United, League Cup, 22 August 2005	Harry Redknapp
David McGoldrick	FW	75	15	(England) Mansfield Town	(England) Nottingham	Republic of Ireland	Age 17 vs. Mansfield Town, Carling Cup, 20 September 2005	Harry Redknapp
Matt Mills	DF	6	0	Retired	(England) Swindon	England U19	Age 19 vs. Watford, Football League Championship, 26 December 2005	Dave Bassett & Dennis Wise
Bartosz Białkowski	GK	42	0	Retired	(Poland) Braniewo	Poland	Age 18 vs. Crystal Palace, Football League Championship, 25 January 2006	George Burley
Andrew Surman	MF	146	18	Retired	(South Africa) Johannesburg	England U21	Age 19 vs. Crystal Palace, Football League Championship, 25 January 2006	George Burley
Simon Gillett	MF	39	0	Retired	(England) Oxford		Age 20 vs. Leicester City, FA Cup, 28 January 2006	George Burley
Gareth Bale	DF/MF	45	5	Retired	(Wales) Cardiff	Wales	Age 16 vs. Millwall, Football League Championship, 17 April 2006	George Burley
Adam Lallana	MF	283	60	Retired	(England) St Albans	England	Age 18 vs. Yeovil Town, League Cup, 23 August 2006	George Burley
Cédric Baseya	FW	1	0	Retired	(France) Brétigny-sur-Orge	(Democratic Republic of the Congo) DR Congo U20	Age 20 vs. Ipswich Town, Football League Championship, 1 March 2008	Nigel Pearson
Michael Poke	GK	4	0	Retired	(England) Staines		Age 22 vs. Wolverhampton Wanderers, Football League Championship, 4 March 2008	Nigel Pearson
Lloyd James	MF	85	2	(England) Clevedon Town	(England) Bristol	Wales U21	Age 20 vs. Cardiff City, Football League Championship, 9 August 2008	Jan Poortvliet
Jake Thomson	MF	16	0	(England) Stoneham	(England) Southsea	Trinidad and Tobago	Age 19 vs. Cardiff City, Football League Championship, 9 August 2008	Jan Poortvliet
Jamie White	FW	3	0	Retired	(England) Southampton		Age 18 vs. Derby County, Football League Championship, 23 August 2008	Jan Poortvliet
Joseph Mills	DF	36	0	Retired	(England) Swindon	England U18	Age 18 vs. Birmingham City, Carling Cup, 26 August 2008	Jan Poortvliet
Olly Lancashire	DF	17	0	Retired	(England) Hook		Age 19 vs. Queens Park Rangers, Football League Championship, 14 September 2008	Jan Poortvliet
Matt Paterson	FW	22	2	Retired	(Scotland) Dunfermline	Scotland U19	Age 18 vs. Norwich City, Football League Championship, 30 September 2008	Jan Poortvliet
Oscar Gobern	MF	25	2	Retired	(England) Birmingham	England U19	Age 17 vs. Preston North End, Football League Championship, 1 November 2008	Jan Poortvliet
Kayne McLaggon	FW	8	1	Retired	(Wales) Barry	Wales C	Age 18 vs. Plymouth Argyle, Football League Championship, 26 December 2008	Jan Poortvliet
Alex Oxlade-Chamberlain	MF	42	10	(Scotland) Celtic	(England) Portsmouth	England	Age 16 vs. Huddersfield Town, Football League One, 2 March 2010	Alan Pardew
Callum McNish	MF	1	0	Retired	(England) Oxford		Age 17 vs. Carlisle United, Football League One, 24 April 2010	Alan Pardew
Aaron Martin	DF	29	2	Retired	(Isle of Wight) Newport, IOW		Age 20 vs. Gillingham, Football League One, 1 May 2010	Alan Pardew
Sam Hoskins	FW	5	0	(England) Northampton Town	(England) Dorchester		Age 18 vs. Swindon Town, League Cup, 30 August 2011	Dean Wilkins
Ben Reeves	DF/MF	13	1	Retired	(England) Verwood	Northern Ireland	Age 19 vs. Preston North End, League Cup, 21 September 2011	Nigel Adkins
James Ward-Prowse	MF	424	56	(England) Southampton	(England) Portsmouth	England	Age 16 vs. Crystal Palace, League Cup, 25 October 2011	Nigel Adkins
Ryan Doble	FW	1	0	Retired	(Wales) Blaenavon	Wales U21	Age 20 vs. Coventry City, FA Cup, 7 January 2012	Nigel Adkins
Jack Stephens	DF	246	9	(England) Southampton	(England) Torpoint	England U21	Age 17 vs. Coventry City, FA Cup, 7 January 2012	Nigel Adkins
Luke Shaw	DF	67	0	(England) Manchester United	(England) Kingston upon Thames	England	Age 16 vs. Millwall, FA Cup, 28 January 2012	Nigel Adkins
Calum Chambers	DF	25	0	(Wales) Cardiff City	(England) Petersfield	England	Age 17 vs. Stevenage, League Cup, 28 August 2012	Nigel Adkins
Andy Robinson	MF	1	0	(England) Havant & Waterlooville	(England) Bournemouth		Age 19 vs. Sheffield Wednesday, League Cup, 25 September 2012	Nigel Adkins
Lloyd Isgrove	MF	8	0	Free Agent	(England) Yeovil	Wales	Age 19 vs. Leeds United, League Cup, 30 October 2012	Nigel Adkins
Harrison Reed	MF	30	0	(England) Fulham	(England) Worthing	England U20	Age 18 vs. Barnsley, League Cup, 27 August 2013	Mauricio Pochettino
Omar Rowe	MF	2	0	(England) Canvey Island	(England) Hackney		Age 18 vs. Barnsley, League Cup, 27 August 2013	Mauricio Pochettino
Jake Sinclair	FW	1	0	Retired	(England) Bath		Age 18 vs. Barnsley, League Cup, 27 August 2013	Mauricio Pochettino
Sam Gallagher	FW	26	2	(England) Stoke City	(England) Camberley	England U20	Age 18 vs. Sunderland, League Cup, 6 November 2013	Mauricio Pochettino
Sam McQueen	DF/MF	29	0	Retired	(England) Southampton	England U21	Age 19 vs. Sunderland, FA Cup, 15 February 2014	Mauricio Pochettino
Matt Targett	DF	63	1	(England) Hull City	(England) Eastleigh	England U21	Age 18 vs. Millwall, League Cup, 26 August 2014	Ronald Koeman
Jake Hesketh	MF	4	1	Free Agent	(England) Stockport		Age 18 vs. Manchester United, Premier League, 8 December 2014	Ronald Koeman
Dominic Gape	MF	1	0	Free Agent	(England) Burton Bradstock		Age 20 vs. Everton, Premier League, 20 December 2014	Ronald Koeman
Jason McCarthy	DF	1	0	Retired	(England) Southampton		Age 19 vs. Crystal Palace, Premier League, 26 December 2014	Ronald Koeman
Ryan Seager	FW	2	0	(England) Havant & Waterlooville	(England) Yeovil	England U20 call-up	Age 18 vs. Crystal Palace, FA Cup, 24 January 2015	Ronald Koeman
Olufela Olomola	FW	1	0	(England) Wealdstone	(England) London		Age 19 vs. Sunderland, EFL Cup, 26 October 2016	Claude Puel
Josh Sims	MF/FW	27	0	(England) AFC Totton	(England) Yeovil	England U20	Age 19 vs. Everton, Premier League, 27 November 2016	Claude Puel
Harry Lewis	GK	3	0	(England) Mansfield Town	(England) Shrewsbury	England U18	Age 19 vs. Norwich City, FA Cup, 7 January 2017	Claude Puel
Michael Obafemi	FW	39	5	(England) Burnley	(Republic of Ireland) Dublin	Republic of Ireland	Age 17 vs. Tottenham Hotspur, Premier League, 21 January 2018	Mauricio Pellegrino
Danny Ings	FW	100	46	(England) Wycombe Wanderers	(England) Winchester	England	Age 26 vs. Burnley, Premier League, 12 August 2018	Mark Hughes
Yan Valery	DF	53	2	(England) Sheffield Wednesday	(France) Champigny-sur-Marne	Tunisia	Age 19 vs. Leicester City, League Cup, 27 November 2018	Mark Hughes
Tyreke Johnson	MF	3	0	(Australia) Eastern Lions	(England) Trowbridge		Age 20 vs. Arsenal, Premier League, 16 December 2018	Ralph Hasenhüttl
Kayne Ramsay	DF	4	0	(England) Charlton Athletic	(England) Hackney		Age 18 vs. Manchester City, Premier League, 30 December 2018	Ralph Hasenhüttl
Marcus Barnes	FW	1	0	(Australia) Brisbane City	(England) Reading		Age 22 vs. Derby County, FA Cup, 5 January 2019	Ralph Hasenhüttl
Callum Slattery	MF	5	0	(England) Sheffield Wednesday	(England) Kidlington	England U20	Age 19 vs. Derby County, FA Cup, 5 January 2019	Ralph Hasenhüttl
Jake Vokins	DF	5	1	(England) Ebbsfleet United	(England) Oxford	England U19	Age 19 vs. Manchester City, League Cup, 29 October 2019	Ralph Hasenhüttl
Will Smallbone	MF	90	9	(England) Leicester City	(England) Basingstoke	Republic of Ireland	Age 19 vs. Huddersfield Town, FA Cup, 4 January 2020	Ralph Hasenhüttl
Nathan Tella	MF/FW	44	3	(Germany) Bayer Leverkusen	(England) Stevenage	Nigeria	Age 20 vs. Norwich City, Premier League, 19 June 2020	Ralph Hasenhüttl
Dan Nlundulu	FW	16	1	(Romania) Petrolul Ploiești	(France) Villiers-le-Bel	England U16	Age 21 vs. Everton, Premier League, 25 October 2020	Ralph Hasenhüttl
Kegs Chauke	MF	1	0	(England) Burton Albion	(South Africa) Pretoria	South Africa U23	Age 18 vs. Shrewsbury Town, FA Cup, 19 January 2021	Ralph Hasenhüttl
Ryan Finnigan	MF	1	0	(Scotland) Dundee	(England) Poole		Age 17 vs. Shrewsbury Town, FA Cup, 19 January 2021	Ralph Hasenhüttl
Alexandre Jankewitz	MF	3	0	(Switzerland) Winterthur	(Switzerland) Vevey	Switzerland U21	Age 19 vs. Shrewsbury Town, FA Cup, 19 January 2021	Ralph Hasenhüttl
Caleb Watts	MF	4	0	(England) Plymouth Argyle	(England) Hammersmith	Australia U23	Age 19 vs. Shrewsbury Town, FA Cup, 19 January 2021	Ralph Hasenhüttl
Allan Tchaptchet	DF	1	0	(Belgium) Royal Excelsior Virton	(France) Besançon	France U16	Age 19 vs. Manchester United, Premier League, 2 February 2021	Ralph Hasenhüttl
Thierry Small	DF	1	0	(England) Preston North End	(England) Solihull	England U21	Age 17 vs. Coventry City, FA Cup, 5 February 2022	Ralph Hasenhüttl
Dom Ballard	FW	4	1	(England) Bristol City	(England) Frimley	England U20	Age 17 vs. Cambridge United, EFL Cup, 23 August 2022	Ralph Hasenhüttl
Diamond Edwards	MF	1	0	(England) Hungerford Town	(England) Reading	England U15 call-up	Age 18 vs. Cambridge United, EFL Cup, 23 August 2022	Ralph Hasenhüttl
Lewis Payne	DF	1	0	(England) Harrogate Town	(England) West Surrey		Age 18 vs. Cambridge United, EFL Cup, 23 August 2022	Ralph Hasenhüttl
Kamari Doyle	MF	2	0	(England) Brighton & Hove Albion (on loan at (England) Leicester City)	(England) Bristol	England U20	Age 17 vs. Brighton & Hove Albion, Premier League, 21 May 2023	Rubén Sellés
Sam Amo-Ameyaw	MF	12	1	(France) Strasbourg	(England) Hackney	England U21	Age 16 vs. Liverpool, Premier League, 28 May 2023	Rubén Sellés
Tyler Dibling	MF	44	4	(England) Everton	(England) Exeter	England U21	Age 17 vs. Gillingham, EFL Cup, 8 August 2023	Russell Martin
Jayden Meghoma	DF	4	0	(England) Brentford (on loan at (England) Portsmouth)	(England) Bath	England U20	Age 17 vs. Gillingham, EFL Cup, 8 August 2023	Russell Martin
Cam Bragg	MF	36	2	(England) Southampton	(England) Winchester	Scotland U21	Age 18 vs. Walsall, FA Cup, 6 January 2024	Russell Martin
Romeo Akachukwu	MF/FW	4	1	(England) Southampton	(Republic of Ireland)	Republic of Ireland U21	Age 18 vs. Cardiff City, EFL Cup, 28 August 2024	Russell Martin
Joe O'Brien-Whitmarsh	MF	2	0	(England) Northampton Town	(Republic of Ireland) Dublin	Republic of Ireland U21	Age 19 vs. Cardiff City, EFL Cup, 28 August 2024	Russell Martin
Jay Robinson	MF/FW	32	2	(England) Southampton (on loan at (Italy) Monza)	(England) Hounslow	England U19	Age 18 vs. Aston Villa, Premier League, 12 April 2025	Simon Rusk
Moses Sesay	MF	1	0	(England) Southampton (on loan at (England) Colchester United)	(England) Lambeth	England U18	Age 18 vs. Norwich City, EFL Cup, 26 August 2025	Will Still
Nicholas Oyekunle	FW	4	0	(England) Southampton (on loan at (England) Leyton Orient)	(England) Portsmouth	England U18	Age 18 vs. Preston North End, EFL Championship, 1 November 2025	Will Still
Barnaby Williams	MF	3	0	(England) Southampton	(England) Melksham		Age 18 vs. Sheffield Wednesday, EFL Championship, 8 November 2025	Tonda Eckert
Sufianu Sillah Dibaga	MF/FW	1	0	(England) Southampton	(Spain) Zaragoza		Age 18 vs. Leicester City, FA Cup, 14 February 2026	Tonda Eckert
