= Joachim Kayi Sanda =

French footballer (born 2006)

Personal information
- Date of birth: 29 November 2006 (age 19)
- Place of birth: Antony, France
- Height: 1.86 m (6 ft 1 in)
- Position: Centre-back

Team information
- Current team: Southampton
- Number: 39

Youth career
- 2012–2018: Antony Sports
- 2018–2020: Antony Évolution
- 2020–2021: A.C.B.B.
- 2021–2023: Valenciennes

Senior career*
| Years | Team | Apps | (Gls) |
| 2023–2025 | Valenciennes II | 4 | (0) |
| 2023–2025 | Valenciennes | 31 | (0) |
| 2025– | Southampton | 2 | (0) |
| 2025–2026 | → Red Star (loan) | 6 | (0) |

International career
| 2022 | France U16 | 2 | (1) |
| 2022– | France U17 | 14 | (0) |
| 2023– | France U18 | 8 | (1) |
Medal record
Men's football
Representing France
FIFA U-17 World Cup
| Runner-up | 2023 Indonesia |
UEFA European Under-17 Championship
| Runner-up | 2023 Hungary |
- * Club domestic league appearances and goals as of 06:18, 29 October 2025 (UTC)

Joachim Kayi Sanda (born 29 November 2006) is a French professional footballer who plays as a centre-back for EFL Championship club Southampton.

== Club career ==
=== Valenciennes ===
Kayi Sanda was born in Antony, Hauts-de-Seine, France. In September 2023, he signed a three-year professional contract with Valenciennes. He made his debut for the Valenciennes first team in Ligue 2 on 21 October 2023, starting against Grenoble Foot 38. In doing so, aged 16 years and ten months, he became the youngest player in the club's history.

=== Southampton ===
On 9 January 2025, Kayi Sanda joined Premier League club Southampton on a four-year contract. He made his debut for the club on 18 May in a 2–0 defeat against Everton after he replaced Taylor Harwood-Bellis in the 82nd minute.

On 25 August 2025, Kayi Sanda joined Ligue 2 club Red Star on a season-long loan. He was recalled from loan and returned to Southampton on 1 January 2026.

== International career ==
Born in France, Kayi Sanda is of DR Congolese descent. He captained France U17s to the finals of the 2023 UEFA European Under-17 Championship and the 2023 FIFA U-17 World Cup, where France reached the final after making the quarter-finals without conceding a goal.

== Career statistics ==
As of match played 28 October 2025

Appearances and goals by club, season and competition
| Club | Season | League | | | National cup (Note: Includes Coupe de France, FA Cup) | | League cup (Note: Includes EFL Cup) | | Other | | Total | |
| Club | Season | Division | Apps | Goals | Apps | Goals | Apps | Goals | Apps | Goals | Apps | Goals |
|---|---|---|---|---|---|---|---|---|---|---|---|---|
| Valenciennes II | 2022–23 | Championnat National 3 | 1 | 0 | — | | — | | — | | 1 | 0 |
| Valenciennes II | 2023–24 | Championnat National 3 | 3 | 0 | — | | — | | — | | 3 | 0 |
| Valenciennes II | Total | | 4 | 0 | — | | — | | — | | 4 | 0 |
| Valenciennes | 2023–24 | Ligue 2 | 20 | 0 | 5 | 0 | — | | — | | 25 | 0 |
| Valenciennes | 2024–25 | Championnat National | 11 | 0 | 1 | 0 | — | | — | | 12 | 0 |
| Valenciennes | Total | | 31 | 0 | 6 | 0 | — | | — | | 37 | 0 |
| Southampton | 2024–25 | Premier League | 2 | 0 | 0 | 0 | — | | — | | 2 | 0 |
| Southampton | 2025–26 | Championship | 0 | 0 | 0 | 0 | 0 | 0 | — | | 0 | 0 |
| Southampton | 2026–27 | Championship | 0 | 0 | 0 | 0 | 0 | 0 | — | | 0 | 0 |
| Southampton | Total | | 2 | 0 | 0 | 0 | 0 | 0 | — | | 2 | 0 |
| Red Star (loan) | 2025–26 | Ligue 2 | 6 | 0 | 0 | 0 | — | | — | | 6 | 0 |
| Career total | | | 43 | 0 | 6 | 0 | 0 | 0 | — | | 49 | 0 |

== Honours ==
U17 France

- UEFA European Under-17 Championship runner-up: 2023
- FIFA U-17 World Cup runner-up: 2023
