= Jake Vokins =

English footballer

Personal information
- Full name: Jake Vokins
- Date of birth: 17 March 2000 (age 26)
- Place of birth: Wallingford, England
- Height: 5 ft 5 in (1.64 m)
- Positions: Left-back; left wing-back

Team information
- Current team: Ebbsfleet United

Youth career
- 2008–2019: Southampton

Senior career*
Years	Team	Apps	(Gls)
2019–2024	Southampton	2	(0)
2021	→ Sunderland (loan)	4	(0)
2021–2022	→ Ross County (loan)	20	(0)
2022–2023	→ Woking (loan)	15	(0)
2024	→ Eastleigh (loan)	6	(0)
2024–2026	Eastleigh	47	(2)
2026–	Ebbsfleet United	12	(1)

International career^{‡}
2017	England U17	3	(0)
2017–2018	England U18	7	(0)
2018	England U19	6	(0)
- * Club domestic league appearances and goals as of 06:04, 11 November 2026 (UTC) ‡ National team caps and goals as of 29 October 2019

Jake Vokins (born 17 March 2000) is an English professional footballer who plays as a left-back for National League South club Ebbsfleet United.

== Club career ==
=== Southampton ===
On 19 September 2018, Vokins signed a professional contract with Southampton. He made his professional debut for Southampton, coming on as a substitute in the dying seconds of a 3–1 EFL Cup loss to Manchester City, on 29 October 2019.

Vokins made his first professional start for Southampton in a 2–0 FA Cup victory over Huddersfield Town on 4 January 2020, scoring the second goal. On 16 July 2020, he made his first Premier League appearance in a 1–1 draw against Brighton. On 4 August 2020, Vokins signed a new four-year deal with the club.

He made his first appearance for Southampton in the 2020–21 season in a 2–0 FA Cup victory against Shrewsbury Town. A week later, Vokins made his first Premier League start of the season in Southampton's 3–1 defeat to Arsenal.

On 24 June 2024, Southampton announced that Vokins would not be offered a new contract on the expiry of the present contract on 30 June.

==== Sunderland (loan) ====
On 29 January 2021, he joined League One side Sunderland on loan until the end of the season. He was cup-tied for Sunderland's victory in the 2021 EFL Trophy Final. Vokins tested positive for COVID-19 during his spell with Sunderland, and an ECG discovered that he had a slight heart flicker. He did not make another appearance for Sunderland afterwards.

==== Ross County (loan) ====
On 2 July 2021, Vokins joined Ross County on loan for the 2021–22 season. On 21 July 2021, he made his first appearance for Ross County in a 1–0 victory over Brora Rangers in the Scottish League Cup and assisted the only goal of the game. On 1 August 2021, Ross County manager Malkay Mackay revealed that Vokins had suffered a stress fracture on his fifth metatarsal and had to have an operation back at Southampton.

==== Woking (loan) ====
On 1 September 2022, he joined Woking on a season-long loan. On 12 January 2023, Vokins was recalled by Southampton.

=== Eastleigh ===
On 29 March 2024, he joined National League side Eastleigh on loan until the end of the season. The same day, Vokins made his first appearance for the club in a 1–0 away victory against Woking. On 2 August 2024, he joined Eastleigh on a permanent contract. Vokins was released by Eastleigh at the end of the 2025–26 season.

=== Ebbsfleet United ===
On 19 June 2026, Vokins agreed to join National League South club Ebbsfleet United.

== International career ==
Vokins was a member of the England under-17 team that finished runners up at the 2017 UEFA European Under-17 Championship and was a second-half substitute in the final against Spain.

== Career statistics ==
As of match played 9 November 2026

Appearances and goals by club, season and competition
Club	Season	League			Cup		League Cup		Other		Total	
Club	Season	Division	Apps	Goals	Apps	Goals	Apps	Goals	Apps	Goals	Apps	Goals
Southampton	2019–20	Premier League	1	0	1	1	1	0	—		3	1
Southampton	2020–21	Premier League	1	0	1	0	0	0	—		2	0
Southampton	2021–22	Premier League	0	0	0	0	0	0	—		0	0
Southampton	2022–23	Premier League	0	0	0	0	0	0	—		0	0
Southampton	2023–24	Championship	0	0	0	0	0	0	—		0	0
Southampton	Total		2	0	2	1	1	0	0	0	5	1
Sunderland (loan)	2020–21	League One	4	0	—		—		—		4	0
Ross County (loan)	2021–22	Scottish Premiership	20	0	1	0	2	0	—		23	0
Woking (loan)	2022–23	National League	15	0	1	0	—		0	0	16	0
Eastleigh (loan)	2023–24	National League	6	0	—		—		0	0	6	0
Eastleigh	2024–25	National League	24	1	0	0	—		1 (Note: Appearance in FA Trophy)	0	25	1
Eastleigh	2025–26	National League	23	1	1	0	—		0	0	24	1
Eastleigh	Total		47	2	1	0	—		1	0	49	2
Ebbsfleet United	2026–27	National League South	12	1	0	0	—		0	0	12	1
Career total			106	3	5	1	3	0	1	0	115	4

== Honours ==
England U17

- UEFA European Under-17 Championship runner-up: 2017
