= Jayden Meghoma =

English footballer

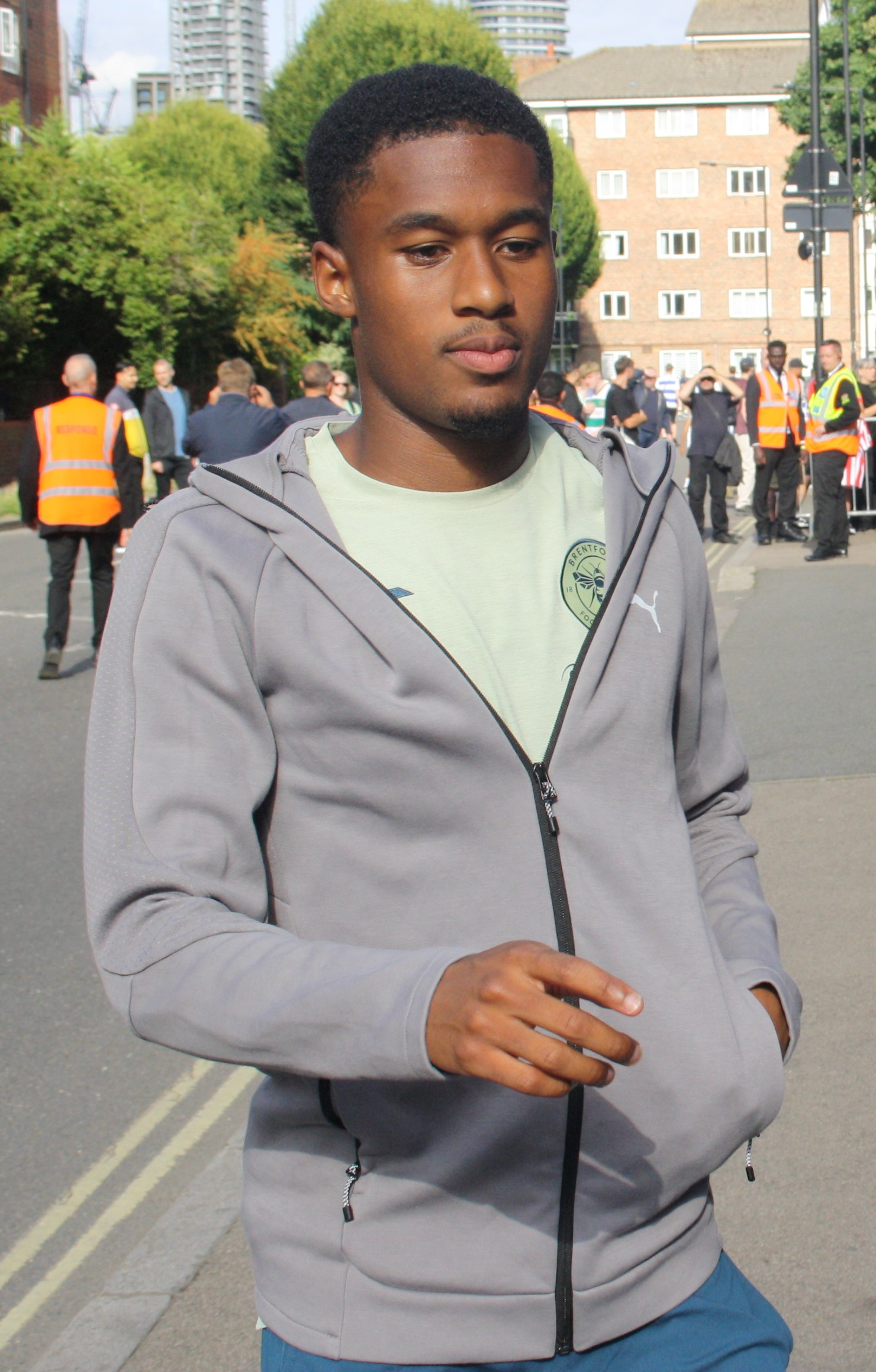
- Meghoma in 2025

Personal information
- Full name: Jayden Ade Trindade Meghoma
- Date of birth: 28 June 2006 (age 20)
- Place of birth: Slough, England
- Position: Left-back

Team information
- Current team: Portsmouth (on loan from Brentford)
- Number: 16

Youth career
- –2022: Tottenham Hotspur
- 2022–2023: Southampton

Senior career*
Years	Team	Apps	(Gls)
2023–2024	Southampton	0	(0)
2024–	Brentford	1	(0)
2025	→ Preston North End (loan)	12	(0)
2025–2026	→ Rangers (loan)	29	(1)
2026–	→ Portsmouth (loan)	10	(0)

International career^{‡}
2021–2022	England U16	11	(0)
2022–2023	England U17	16	(0)
2023–2024	England U18	8	(0)
2024–2025	England U19	11	(0)
2025–	England U20	3	(0)
- * Club domestic league appearances and goals as of 10:32, 12 November 2026 (UTC) ‡ National team caps and goals as of 23:26, 31 March 2026 (UTC)

Jayden Ade Trindade Meghoma (born 28 June 2006) is an English professional footballer who plays as a left-back for EFL Championship club Portsmouth, on loan from Premier League club Brentford.

== Club career ==
=== Southampton ===
On 4 August 2022, Meghoma signed for Southampton on an initial scholarship deal. Meghoma signed his first professional contract on 13 July 2023, keeping him at the club until 2025. On 8 August 2023, he made his professional debut in a 3–1 defeat to Gillingham in the EFL Cup.

=== Brentford ===
On 30 August 2024, Meghoma joined Premier League side Brentford on a four-year contract with the option to extend the deal by two years. He made his Premier League debut for Brentford as an 86th minute substitution in a 2–1 loss away to Chelsea on 15 December 2024.

==== Preston North End (loan) ====
On 16 January 2025, Meghoma joined Preston North End on loan for the remainder of the season. He made his debut for the club on 21 January 2025 in a 2–1 away victory against Watford. He started in their FA Cup quarter-final elimination against Aston Villa.

==== Rangers (loan) ====
On 17 August 2025, Meghoma joined Rangers on a season-long loan. Two days later he made his debut for the club starting in a UEFA Champions League qualifying round defeat against Club Brugge.

==== Portsmouth (loan) ====
On 1 September 2026, Meghoma joined Portsmouth on a season-long loan.

== International career ==
Born in England, Meghoma is of Nigerian descent and holds dual-citizenship. He has represented England at under-16 and under-17 level.

Meghoma was a member of the England under-17 squad that finished fifth at the 2023 UEFA European Under-17 Championship. On 6 September 2023, he made his England under-18 debut during a 2–0 defeat to France in Limoges. Meghoma was included in the England squad for the 2023 FIFA U-17 World Cup and started in their round of sixteen elimination against Uzbekistan.

On 4 September 2024, Meghoma made his England U19 debut as a substitute against Italy in Nedelišće. He was a member of England's squad at the 2025 UEFA European Under-19 Championship.

On 5 September 2025, Meghoma made his U20 debut during a 2–1 defeat to Italy at the SMH Group Stadium.

== Career statistics ==
=== Club ===
As of match played 7 November 2026

Appearances and goals by club, season and competition
Club	Season	League			National cup (Note: Includes FA Cup, Scottish Cup)		League cup (Note: Includes EFL Cup, Scottish League Cup)		Europe		Other		Total	
Club	Season	Division	Apps	Goals	Apps	Goals	Apps	Goals	Apps	Goals	Apps	Goals	Apps	Goals
Southampton	2023–24	Championship	0	0	3	0	1	0	—		0	0	4	0
Brentford	2024–25	Premier League	1	0	0	0	3	0	—		—		4	0
Brentford	2025–26	Premier League	0	0	—		—		—		—		0	0
Brentford	2026–27	Premier League	0	0	—		0	0	—		—		0	0
Brentford	Total		1	0	3	0	4	0	—		—		8	0
Preston North End (loan)	2024–25	Championship	12	0	2	0	—		—		—		14	0
Rangers (loan)	2025–26	Scottish Premiership	29	1	3	0	2	0	10 (Note: Two appearances in UEFA Champions League, eight appearances in UEFA Europa League)	0	—		44	1
Portsmouth (loan)	2026–27	Championship	10	0	0	0	—		—		—		10	0
Career total			52	1	8	0	6	0	10	0	0	0	76	1

== Honours ==
England U18

- U18 Pinatar Super Cup: 2024
