= James Ward-Prowse =

English footballer (born 1994)

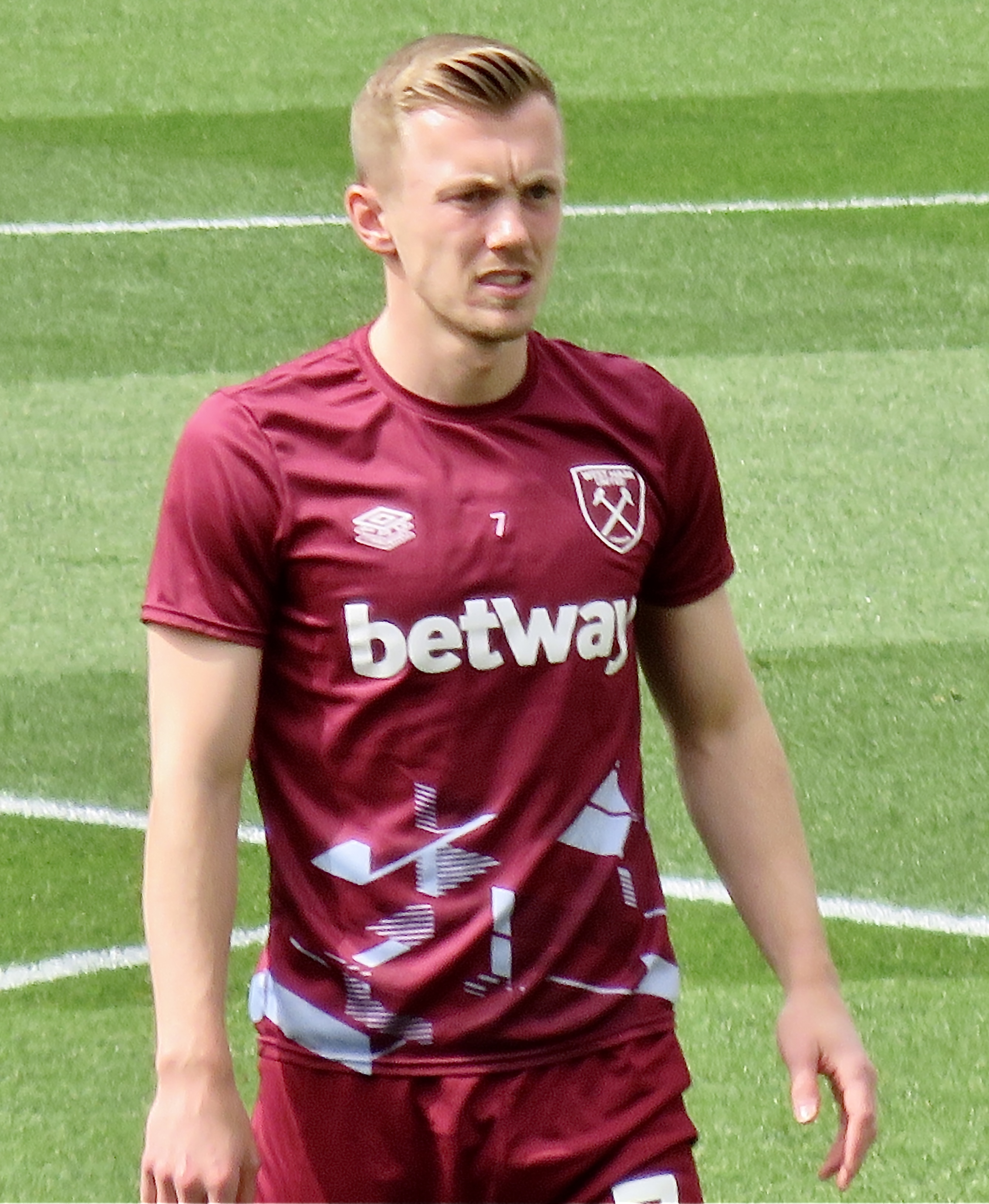
- Ward-Prowse warming up for West Ham United in 2024

Personal information
- Full name: James Michael Edward Ward-Prowse
- Date of birth: 1 November 1994 (age 32)
- Place of birth: Portsmouth, England
- Height: 5 ft 10 in (1.77 m)
- Position: Central midfielder

Team information
- Current team: Southampton
- Number: 30

Youth career
- 2001–2003: East Lodge
- 2003–2011: Southampton

Senior career*
Years	Team	Apps	(Gls)
2011–2023	Southampton	344	(49)
2023–2026	West Ham United	58	(8)
2024–2025	→ Nottingham Forest (loan)	9	(0)
2026	→ Burnley (loan)	13	(0)
2026–	Southampton	14	(1)

International career
2010–2011	England U17	7	(0)
2012–2013	England U19	4	(0)
2013–2014	England U20	7	(1)
2013–2017	England U21	31	(6)
2017–2022	England	11	(2)
- * Club domestic league appearances and goals as of 15:40, 21 November 2026 (UTC)

James Michael Edward Ward-Prowse (born 1 November 1994) is an English professional footballer who plays as a central midfielder for EFL Championship club Southampton.

Originally a member of Southampton's youth teams, Ward-Prowse made his first-team debut in October 2011, and signed his first professional contract in 2012. He became a regular for Southampton and was appointed as captain in 2020. In 2023, he played his 400th game for the club, before leaving for West Ham United the same year. He had loan spells at Nottingham Forest and Burnley. In 2026, Ward-Prowse rejoined Southampton.

Ward-Prowse has represented England at under-17, under-19 and under-20 levels and earned 31 caps and scored 6 goals at under-21 level, also serving as captain. He made his senior international debut in March 2017 in a 1–0 away defeat to Germany.

== Early and personal life ==
Born in Portsmouth, Hampshire, Ward-Prowse is the son of John Ward-Prowse, a barrister. Although his family are Portsmouth supporters, Ward-Prowse joined their South Coast derby rivals Southampton at the age of eight.

Ward-Prowse and his wife, Olivia, have one son, born in 2018.

== Club career ==
=== Early years ===
After playing locally for East Lodge from the age of six, Ward-Prowse joined the Southampton Academy at the age of eight, later featuring in every match for the under-18 team in the 2010–11 season before becoming a full-time scholar in 2011. While at the Southampton academy, he secretly trained with non-League team Havant & Waterlooville to "toughen" himself.

=== Southampton ===
==== 2011–2014 ====
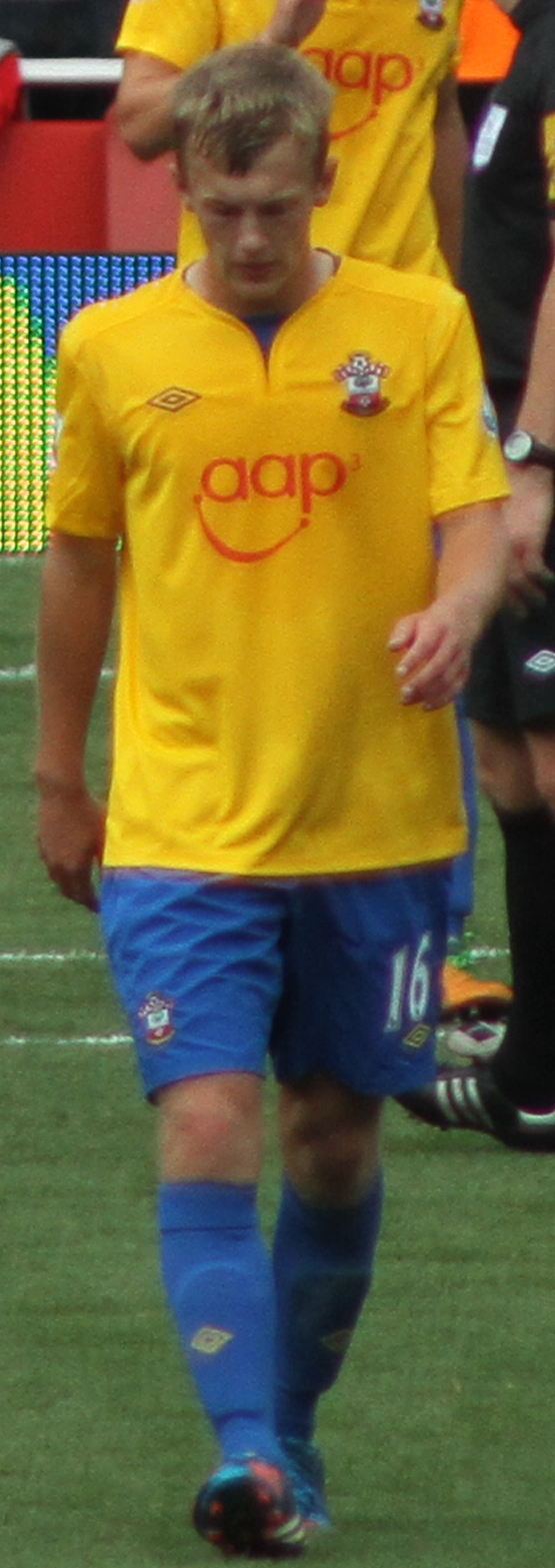
Ward-Prowse playing for Southampton in 2012

Ward-Prowse was first called up to the Southampton first team in October 2011, when he made his debut at the age of 16 in the Football League Cup against Crystal Palace. In his second starting appearance for the team, Ward-Prowse scored Southampton's first goal in a 2–1 win over Coventry City to help his side through to the fourth round of the FA Cup. Following the club's promotion to the top flight in May 2012, Ward-Prowse was one of four youth players offered a professional contract for their return to the Premier League, along with Jack Stephens, Luke Shaw, and Calum Chambers.

Ward-Prowse made his Premier League debut for Southampton on the opening day of the 2012–13 season, playing the first 65 minutes of a 3–2 loss against reigning champions Manchester City. After the match, his performance was described by manager Nigel Adkins as "outstanding". After a substitute appearance against Wigan Athletic, the 17-year-old returned to the starting line-up for the third match of the campaign against Manchester United, continuing to draw praise from commentators. In November, shortly after his 18th birthday, Ward-Prowse signed a five-year contract with Southampton, amidst speculation that he might leave the club in the near future.

In a home match against Queens Park Rangers in March 2013, Ward-Prowse was involved in a late attack which could have saved the hosts a point when he provided a cross to be headed at goal by centre-back Maya Yoshida, only for substitute goalkeeper Robert Green to save and secure the win for the visitors. He later provided the assist for a Jason Puncheon equaliser in the penultimate match of the season against fellow strugglers Sunderland on 12 May, picking up play from strikers Jay Rodriguez and Rickie Lambert to cross for Puncheon to secure an important point for Southampton in the 75th minute of play.

Despite making 15 league appearances for his club throughout the season, many of these came as a substitute, and as a result it was reported at the end of the season that Ward-Prowse was "not content sitting on the bench". The midfielder did, however, win the Scholar of the Season accolade at the Southampton club awards ceremony in May, beating academy teammates Luke Shaw and Dominic Gape to the title.

At the beginning of the 2013–14 season, Ward-Prowse came into favour with manager Mauricio Pochettino to start the first match of the season against West Bromwich Albion, almost scoring in one of the few attacking moves of an otherwise uneventful encounter which ended 1–0 to Southampton thanks to a last-minute penalty from Lambert. The midfielder also played the full 90 minutes of the following match against Sunderland, registering an assist with a free kick in the 88th minute which was headed in for a late equaliser by centre-back José Fonte.

Ward-Prowse was an ever-present at the start of the 2014–15 season, until on 20 September, when he fractured his foot in a win over Swansea City. He was subsequently ruled out for 10 weeks.

==== 2015–2023 ====
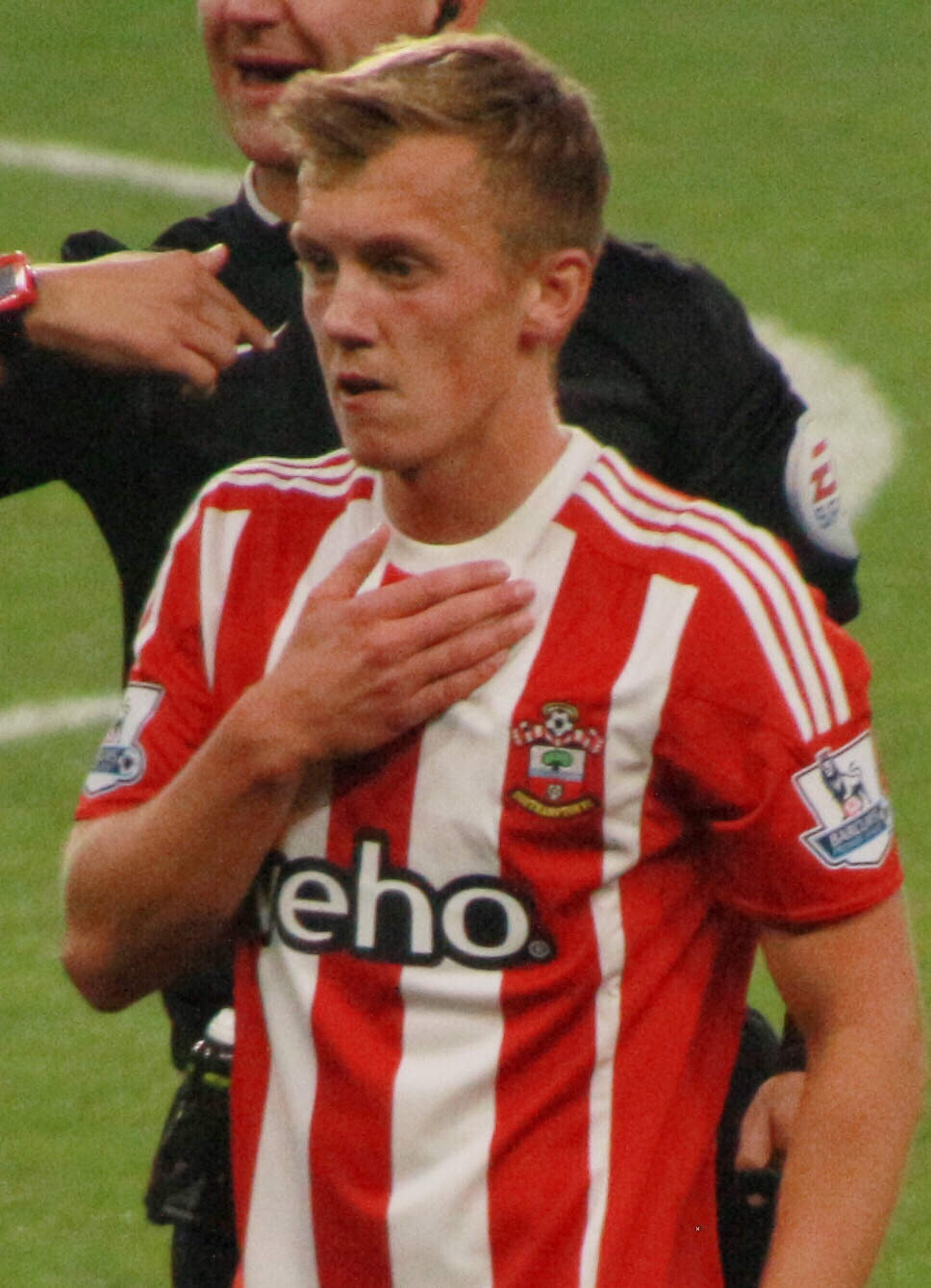
Ward-Prowse playing for Southampton in 2015

He signed a new five-and-a-half-year contract in January 2015. On 11 April, he scored his first Premier League goal, opening the scoring in a 2–0 win against Hull City with a penalty kick. He was given a straight red card on 2 May for a foul on Sunderland's Jermain Defoe, conceding a penalty from which Jordi Gómez scored the winning goal.

On 3 October 2015, Ward-Prowse was a half-time substitute for Oriol Romeu in a 3–1 win away to reigning champions Chelsea. This was his 100th Southampton appearance, making him the fourth-youngest player to reach that figure.

Ward-Prowse was praised by manager Ronald Koeman after scoring two goals in a 3–0 home win against West Bromwich Albion on 16 January 2016: a free kick and a penalty. He amassed 39 appearances and scored twice during the 2015–16 season. On 13 May 2016, he signed a new six-year contract, keeping him at the club until 2022.

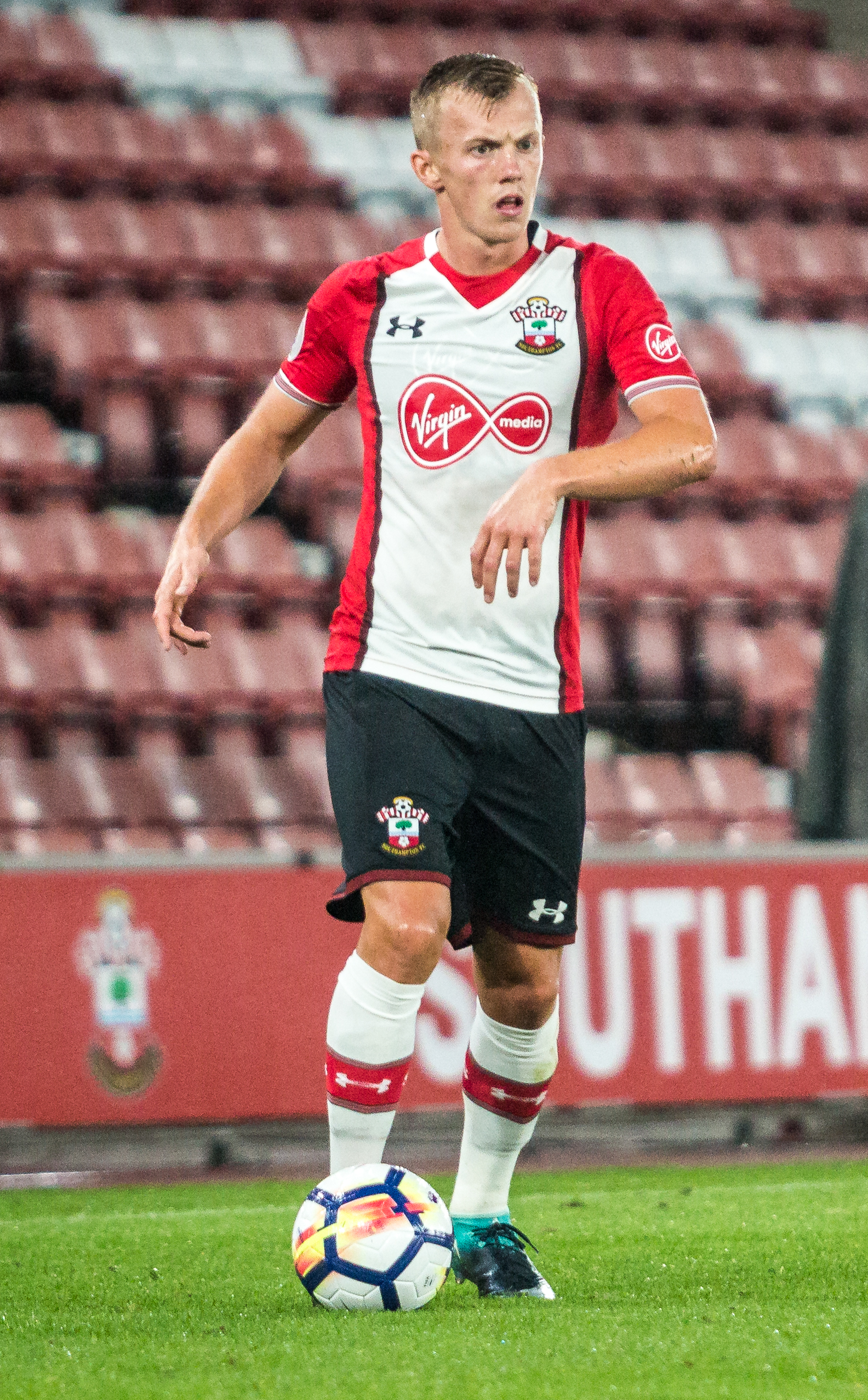
Ward-Prowse playing for Southampton in 2017

Ward-Prowse scored his first goal of the 2016–17 season on 25 September 2016 with an injury-time strike to seal a 3–0 away win over West Ham United. He doubled his tally on 22 January 2017, opening the scoring in a 3–0 home victory over reigning Premier League champions Leicester City as Southampton ended a run of four successive league defeats. He made his 200th appearance in all competitions for Southampton on 7 April 2018.

In June 2020, Ward-Prowse replaced Pierre-Emile Højbjerg as Southampton captain, initially until the end of the 2019–20 season, after the Dane publicly expressed a desire to leave the club. On 17 August 2020, Ward-Prowse signed a new contract until June 2025.

On 26 January 2021, Ward-Prowse played his 300th Southampton game, assisting a goal by Stuart Armstrong in a 3–1 home defeat by Arsenal. After Southampton rejected a reported offer from Aston Villa of £25 million for Ward-Prowse, he signed a new five-year contract on 19 August 2021.

Ward-Prowse scored a penalty in Southampton's 3–1 loss to Chelsea at Stamford Bridge on 2 October 2021, but he also got a red card after Martin Atkinson went to the VAR monitor to review a late challenge he made on Jorginho. The subsequent suspension ended his run of 117 consecutive appearances in all competitions, dating back to December 2018.

On 15 January 2022, Ward-Prowse scored a free-kick goal in Southampton's 3–1 loss to Wolverhampton Wanderers at Molineux Stadium. The goal placed him joint second in the list of most free-kick goals in Premier League history (12), only behind David Beckham (18). He was then described by Pep Guardiola as the greatest free-kick taker in the world. On 18 February 2023, his free-kick tally had risen to 17. 13 of these had been scored in away games, two more than Beckham's away record of 11 free-kicks.

In March 2023, Ward-Prowse played his 330th Premier League game for Southampton, breaking Jason Dodd's club record. He played his 400th game for the club on 2 April 2023, a 1–0 loss at West Ham, who were also fighting relegation.

After Southampton were relegated from the Premier League on 13 May 2023, Ward-Prowse said the club's standards had slipped.

=== West Ham United ===
On 14 August 2023, Ward-Prowse signed for Premier League club West Ham United on a four-year contract, for a reported transfer fee of £30 million. He made his debut on 20 August, making two assists in a 3–1 home victory over Chelsea. He described the game as a "dream debut" as he assisted the opening goal for Nayef Aguerd and West Ham's second goal, for Michail Antonio. He scored his first goal for the club and his 50th in the Premier League in the following match, a 3–1 away victory over Brighton & Hove Albion on 26 August. On 6 April 2024, Ward-Prowse scored directly from a corner kick in West Ham's 2–1 win at Wolverhampton Wanderers.

==== Loans to Nottingham Forest and Burnley ====
On 30 August 2024, Ward-Prowse signed for Premier League club Nottingham Forest on loan for the 2024–25 season. On 3 February 2025, the loan was terminated and Ward-Prowse returned to West Ham United.

In September 2025, Ward-Prowse was dropped by West Ham's new manager Nuno Espírito Santo. In January 2026 he signed on loan for Burnley.

=== Return to Southampton ===
On 28 August 2026, Ward-Prowse rejoined Southampton on a two-year contract. He made his second debut for the club on 29 August in a 5–1 victory against Millwall after he was a half-time substitute for Flynn Downes.

== International career ==
=== Youth ===
Ward-Prowse began his international career with the England under-17 team, gaining seven caps for the team in two tournaments between 2010 and 2011. In 2012, he made the step up to the under-19 team, for whom he played four times, and in 2013 joined the under-20s for the 2013 FIFA U-20 World Cup in Turkey; the midfielder played all three matches in the tournament, none of which England won.

In August 2013, at the age of 18, Ward-Prowse received his first call-up to the England under-21 team, for the 2015 UEFA European Under-21 Championship qualification matches against Moldova and Finland. He played for 64 minutes in the first match, and for the full 90 against Finland, in which he had some of England's clearest goal-scoring opportunities. He scored his first under-21 goal on 15 October, scoring a free kick from 20 yards in a 5–0 win against Lithuania. During the 2014 Toulon Tournament, he scored a "stunning" free kick against Brazil during the group stages. This was later voted "Goal of the Tournament"; Ward-Prowse was also voted as one of the best three players in the tournament.

In April 2015, Roy Hodgson called Ward-Prowse a "big prospect" and hinted at a possible senior team call-up by saying "he'll be in our thoughts because we like him very much."

On 29 May 2016, he captained England under-21s to their first Toulon Tournament victory since 1994, by beating hosts France 2–1. Ward-Prowse was nominated for the Vauxhall England Under-21 Player of the Year award, but eventually lost out to Southampton teammate Nathan Redmond.

In June 2017, he captained the under-21s at that year's edition of the European Under-21 Championship where England reached the semi-finals, eventually losing to Germany in a penalty shoot-out.

=== Senior ===
On 16 March 2017, he earned his first call-up to the senior England squad for a friendly against Germany and a World Cup qualifying match against Lithuania. Six days later, he made his senior debut along with teammate Nathan Redmond in a 1–0 away loss to Germany, replacing West Bromwich Albion's Jake Livermore after 82 minutes.

In March 2019, Ward-Prowse was recalled to the senior national team for England's first two matches of UEFA Euro 2020 qualifying. He was brought on after 82 minutes in England's 5–1 away win over Montenegro on 25 March. This was Ward-Prowse's first competitive appearance for England with his first start coming away to Iceland during a 1–0 win on 5 September 2020. On 25 March 2021, he scored his first international goal in a 5–0 win over San Marino.

On 25 May 2021, he was named in England's 33-man provisional squad for UEFA Euro 2020, although he did not make the final squad. He was again called up on 5 October as a replacement for the injured Kalvin Phillips for the 2022 FIFA World Cup qualification fixtures against Andorra and Hungary on 9 and 12 October 2021. He did not make the final squad for the tournament, as manager Gareth Southgate said he was "just behind" Jordan Henderson and Jude Bellingham.

== Style of play ==
Mainly playing as a central midfielder, Ward-Prowse can also play as an attacking midfielder, right midfielder, or right back.

He is particularly known for his skill and accuracy at taking free kicks, and in February 2023 was described as "one of the best ever" set-piece takers by the BBC. He holds the Southampton record for Premier League free-kick goals, has the league's best free-kick conversion rate since 2003, when Opta started recording them, and is considered one of the top set-piece specialists in the game. In 2020, then-Manchester City manager Pep Guardiola remarked that Ward-Prowse is "the best free-kick taker I have seen in my life".

Ward-Prowse is also acclaimed for his exceptional fitness levels and stamina; in 2021, he became the first Premier League player to play every single minute of two consecutive Premier League seasons. He is known for celebrating his goals by mimicking a golf swing.

== Career statistics ==
=== Club ===
As of match played 21 November 2026

Appearances and goals by club, season and competition
Club	Season	League			FA Cup		League Cup		Europe		Total	
Club	Season	Division	Apps	Goals	Apps	Goals	Apps	Goals	Apps	Goals	Apps	Goals
Southampton	2011–12	Championship	0	0	1	1	1	0	—		2	1
Southampton	2012–13	Premier League	15	0	1	0	3	0	—		19	0
Southampton	2013–14	Premier League	34	0	3	0	2	0	—		39	0
Southampton	2014–15	Premier League	25	1	3	0	2	0	—		30	1
Southampton	2015–16	Premier League	33	2	1	0	2	0	3 (Note: Appearances in UEFA Europa League)	0	39	2
Southampton	2016–17	Premier League	30	4	2	0	5	0	6	0	43	4
Southampton	2017–18	Premier League	30	3	2	1	1	0	—		33	4
Southampton	2018–19	Premier League	26	7	2	0	1	0	—		29	7
Southampton	2019–20	Premier League	38	5	3	0	3	0	—		44	5
Southampton	2020–21	Premier League	38	8	5	1	1	0	—		44	9
Southampton	2021–22	Premier League	36	10	4	1	2	0	—		42	11
Southampton	2022–23	Premier League	38	9	2	1	5	1	—		45	11
Southampton	2023–24	Championship	1	0	—		0	0	—		1	0
Southampton	Total		344	49	29	5	28	1	9	0	410	55
West Ham United	2023–24	Premier League	37	7	2	0	2	0	10	0	51	7
West Ham United	2024–25	Premier League	15	1	—		1	0	—		16	1
West Ham United	2025–26	Premier League	5	0	0	0	1	0	—		6	0
West Ham United	2026–27	Championship	1	0	0	0	1	0	—		2	0
West Ham United	Total		58	8	2	0	5	0	10	0	75	8
Nottingham Forest (loan)	2024–25	Premier League	9	0	1	0	—		—		10	0
Burnley (loan)	2025–26	Premier League	13	0	1	0	—		—		14	0
Southampton	2026–27	Championship	14	1	0	0	—		—		14	1
Career total			438	58	33	5	33	1	19	0	523	64

=== International ===
As of match played 11 June 2022

Appearances and goals by national team and year
National team	Year	Apps	Goals
England	2017	1	0
England	2018	0	0
England	2019	1	0
England	2020	2	0
England	2021	5	2
England	2022	2	0
Total		11	2

As of match played 11 June 2022
England score listed first, score column indicates score after each Ward-Prowse goal

List of international goals scored by James Ward-Prowse
No.	Date	Venue	Cap	Opponent	Score	Result	Competition	Ref.
1	25 March 2021	Wembley Stadium, London, England	5	San Marino	1–0	5–0	2022 FIFA World Cup qualification	
2	9 October 2021	Estadi Nacional, Andorra la Vella, Andorra	9	Andorra	4–0	5–0	2022 FIFA World Cup qualification	

== Honours ==
Southampton

- EFL Cup runner-up: 2016–17

England U21

- Toulon Tournament: 2016

Individual

- Southampton Player of the Season: 2020–21, 2021–22
