= Samuel Edozie =

English footballer (born 2003)

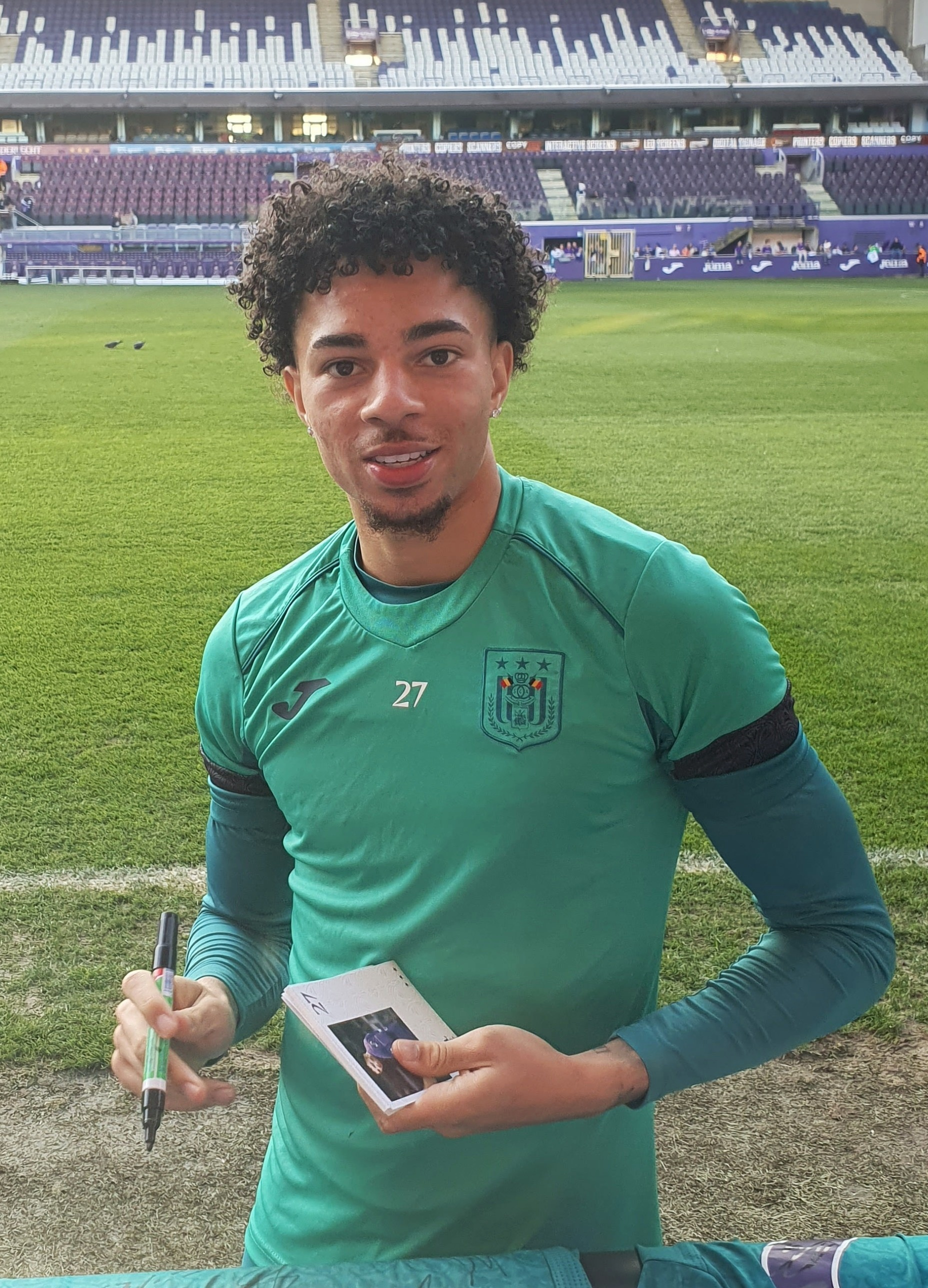
- Samuel Edozie at RSC Anderlecht in 2025

Personal information
- Full name: Samuel Ikechukwu Edozie
- Date of birth: 28 January 2003 (age 23)
- Place of birth: Lewisham, England
- Height: 5 ft 10 in (1.79 m)
- Position: Winger

Team information
- Current team: Southampton
- Number: 23

Youth career
- –2019: Millwall
- 2019–2021: Manchester City

Senior career*
Years	Team	Apps	(Gls)
2021–2022	Manchester City	0	(0)
2022–	Southampton	75	(7)
2024–2025	→ Anderlecht (loan)	23	(3)

International career
2021	England U18	1	(0)
2021–2022	England U19	4	(1)
2022–2023	England U20	10	(3)
- * Club domestic league appearances and goals as of 15:37, 21 November 2026 (UTC)

Samuel Ikechukwu Edozie (born 28 January 2003) is an English professional footballer who plays as a winger for EFL Championship club Southampton.

Edozie is a product of the Manchester City academy and made his professional debut for the club in the 2021 FA Community Shield. In September 2022, he joined Southampton. Edozie spent the 2024–25 season on loan at Anderlecht. He has represented his country at youth level.

== Club career ==
=== Early career ===
Edozie was born in Lewisham, South London. He attended Ashgrove School in Bromley and Beths Grammar School in Bexley. He began his career in the youth system at nearby Millwall before moving away and arriving at the 2018–19 Premier League champions Manchester City in July 2019 for a reported seven-figure fee.

After impressing in 2021–22 pre-season, Edozie made his Manchester City debut on 7 August 2021, being named in the starting lineup for the 2021 FA Community Shield.

=== Southampton ===
On 1 September 2022, Edozie signed a five-year contract with Southampton in a deal which also saw Manchester City full back Juan Larios join the South Coast club. On 3 September 2022, he made his club and Premier League debut in a 1–0 away loss to Wolverhampton Wanderers, coming on after 73 minutes for Romain Perraud.

On 26 August 2023, Edozie scored his first professional goal for the club in a 2–1 victory against Queens Park Rangers. During a 1–1 draw with Norwich City on 1 January 2024, he picked up an ankle injury, with manager Russell Martin later confirming he was expected to be sidelined until the end of January.

On 1 September 2026, Edozie announced he had handed in a transfer request to Southampton, citing a lack of playing time.

==== Anderlecht (loan) ====
On 4 September 2024, Edozie joined Belgian side Anderlecht on a season-long loan. He made his debut for the club on 14 September 2024 in a 2–2 draw with Westerlo after he replaced Yari Verschaeren in the 62nd minute. On 28 September 2024, Edozie scored his first goal for the club in a 1–1 draw with Dender.

== International career ==
Edozie was born in England to an Igbo Nigerian father and an English mother. He is a youth international for England.

On 2 September 2021, Edozie made his debut for the England U19s during a 2–0 victory over Italy U19s at St. George's Park.

On 21 September 2022, Edozie made his England U20 debut and scored during a 3–0 victory over Chile at the Pinatar Arena. On 10 May 2023, Edozie was included in the England squad for the 2023 FIFA U-20 World Cup.

== Personal life ==
Edozie's younger brother Tom is also a footballer and plays for Wolverhampton Wanderers.

== Career statistics ==
As of match played 21 November 2026

Appearances and goals by club, season and competition
Club	Season	League			National Cup (Note: Includes FA Cup, Belgian Cup)		League Cup (Note: Includes EFL Cup)		Europe		Other		Total	
Club	Season	Division	Apps	Goals	Apps	Goals	Apps	Goals	Apps	Goals	Apps	Goals	Apps	Goals
Manchester City	2021–22	Premier League	0	0	0	0	0	0	0	0	1 (Note: Appearance in FA Community Shield)	0	1	0
Southampton	2022–23	Premier League	17	0	3	0	4	0	—		—		24	0
Southampton	2023–24	Championship	32	6	2	0	0	0	—		2 (Note: Appearances in Championship play-offs)	0	36	6
Southampton	2024–25	Premier League	2	0	—		1	0	—		—		3	0
Southampton	2025–26	Championship	12	0	4	0	0	0	—		2	0	18	0
Southampton	2026–27	Championship	12	1	0	0	1	0	—		—		13	1
Southampton	Total		75	7	9	0	6	0	—		4	0	94	7
Anderlecht (loan)	2024–25	Belgian Pro League	23	3	4	0	—		5 (Note: Appearances in UEFA Europa League)	1	—		32	4
Career total			98	10	13	0	6	0	5	1	5	0	127	11

== Honours ==
Anderlecht

- Belgian Cup runner-up: 2024–25

Southampton

- EFL Championship play-offs: 2024
