= 2023–24 Southampton F.C. season =

107th season in existence of Southampton FC

Southampton
2023–24 season
- Owner: Sport Republic
- Manager: Russell Martin
- Stadium: St Mary's Stadium
- Championship: 4th (promoted via play-offs)
- Championship play-offs: Winners
- FA Cup: Fifth round
- EFL Cup: First round
- Top goalscorer: League: Adam Armstrong (21); All: Adam Armstrong (24)
- Highest home attendance: 30,869 v Sunderland (9 March 2024)
- Lowest home attendance: 17,844 v Watford (6 February 2024)
- Average home league attendance: 29,373
Home colours	Away colours	Third colours

The 2023–24 season was the 107th season in the history of Southampton and their first season back in the EFL Championship since their 2011–12 campaign, following relegation from the Premier League in the previous season. In addition to the domestic league, the club participated in the FA Cup and the EFL Cup.

Russell Martin was appointed as the new manager of Southampton as they agreed with Swansea City to let him go along with his backroom staff. In his first season in charge, Southampton won promotion to the Premier League via the play-offs at the first time of asking after beating Leeds United 1–0.

== Players ==
N	Pos.	Nat.	Name	Age	Since	App	Goals	Ends	Transfer fee	Notes
1	GK	(England)	Alex McCarthy	34	2016	147	0	2024	Undisclosed	
2	DF	(England)	Kyle Walker-Peters	27	2020	167	6	2025	Undisclosed	
3	DF	(Republic of Ireland)	Ryan Manning	27	2023	41	0	2027	Free transfer	
4	MF	(England)	Flynn Downes	25	2023	36	2	2024	Loan	
5	DF	(England)	Jack Stephens	30	2011	181	6	2025	Academy	Captain
7	MF	(Nigeria)	Joe Aribo	27	2022	67	6	2026	Undisclosed	
9	FW	(England)	Adam Armstrong	27	2021	119	29	2025	Undisclosed	
10	FW	(Scotland)	Ché Adams	27	2019	191	49	2024	Undisclosed	
11	FW	(Scotland)	Ross Stewart	27	2023	4	0	2026	Undisclosed	
13	GK	(England)	Joe Lumley	29	2023	4	0	2025	Free transfer	
14	DF	(England)	James Bree	26	2023	27	0	2026	Undisclosed	
16	MF	(Republic of Ireland)	Will Smallbone	24	2008	70	8	2026	Academy	
17	MF	(Scotland)	Stuart Armstrong	32	2018	214	25	2024	£7M	
18	FW	(France)	Sékou Mara	21	2022	64	8	2026	Undisclosed	
19	MF	(England)	Joe Rothwell	29	2024	20	4	2024	Loan	
20	MF	(Ghana)	Kamaldeen Sulemana	22	2023	44	2	2027	Undisclosed	
21	DF	(England)	Taylor Harwood-Bellis	22	2023	46	2	2024	Loan	
23	MF	(England)	Samuel Edozie	21	2022	60	6	2027	Undisclosed	
24	MF	(Northern Ireland)	Shea Charles	20	2023	38	0	2027	Undisclosed	
26	MF	(Scotland)	Ryan Fraser	30	2023	44	8	2024	Loan	
27	MF	(England)	Sam Amo-Ameyaw	17	2022	8	0	2026	Academy	
28	DF	(Spain)	Juan Larios	20	2022	5	0	2027	Undisclosed	
31	GK	(Republic of Ireland)	Gavin Bazunu	22	2022	78	0	2027	Undisclosed	
35	DF	(Poland)	Jan Bednarek	28	2017	220	9	2025	Undisclosed	
36	MF	(Wales)	David Brooks	26	2024	20	2	2024	Loan	

== Transfers ==
Players transferred in

Date	Pos.	Player	Club	Fee	Ref.
5 July 2023	DF	(England) Derrick Abu	(England) Chelsea	Free transfer	
6 July 2023	GK	(England) Josh McNamara	(England) Manchester City	Undisclosed	
11 July 2023	DF	(Republic of Ireland) Ryan Manning	(Wales) Swansea City	Free transfer	
12 July 2023	MF	(Northern Ireland) Shea Charles	(England) Manchester City	Undisclosed	
7 August 2023	GK	(England) Joe Lumley	(England) Middlesbrough	Free transfer	
8 August 2023	DF	(England) Zach Awe	(England) Arsenal	Free transfer	
1 September 2023	FW	(Scotland) Ross Stewart	(England) Sunderland	Undisclosed	
12 January 2024	MF	(Republic of Ireland) Joe O'Brien-Whitmarsh	(Republic of Ireland) Cork City	Undisclosed	

Players loaned in

Date	Pos.	Player	Club	Duration	Ref.
21 August 2023	MF	(England) Flynn Downes	(England) West Ham United	End of season	
25 August 2023	MF	(Scotland) Ryan Fraser	(England) Newcastle United	End of season	
25 August 2023	DF	(England) Mason Holgate	(England) Everton	1 February 2024	
1 September 2023	DF	(England) Taylor Harwood-Bellis	(England) Manchester City	End of season	
15 January 2024	MF	(England) Joe Rothwell	(England) AFC Bournemouth	End of season	
30 January 2024	MF	(Wales) David Brooks	(England) AFC Bournemouth	End of season	
1 February 2024	MF	(Portugal) Ussumane Djaló	(Portugal) Porto B	End of season	

Players transferred out

Date	Pos.	Player	Club	Fee	Ref.
24 June 2023	FW	(England) Dan Nlundulu	(England) Bolton Wanderers	Undisclosed	
29 June 2023	MF	(South Africa) Kegs Chauke	(England) Burton Albion	Undisclosed	
30 June 2023	MF	(Croatia) Mislav Oršić	(Turkey) Trabzonspor	Undisclosed	
19 July 2023	MF	(France) Ibrahima Diallo	(Qatar) Al-Duhail	Undisclosed	
1 August 2023	DF	(Ghana) Mohammed Salisu	Monaco	Undisclosed	
8 August 2023	DF	(England) Tino Livramento	(England) Newcastle United	Undisclosed	
14 August 2023	MF	(England) James Ward-Prowse	(England) West Ham United	Undisclosed	
18 August 2023	MF	(Belgium) Roméo Lavia	(England) Chelsea	Undisclosed	
27 August 2023	MF	(England) Nathan Tella	(Germany) Bayer Leverkusen	Undisclosed	
29 August 2023	MF	(Belgium) Kazeem Olaigbe	(Belgium) Cercle Brugge	Undisclosed	
5 September 2023	MF	(Mali) Moussa Djenepo	(Belgium) Standard Liège	Undisclosed	
12 January 2024	GK	(England) Jack Bycroft	(England) Swindon Town	Undisclosed	
26 January 2024	MF	(England) Kamari Doyle	(England) Brighton & Hove Albion	Undisclosed	
31 January 2024	MF	(England) Ryan Finnigan	(England) Blackpool	Undisclosed	

Players loaned out

Date	Pos.	Player	Club	Duration	Ref.
23 June 2023	GK	(England) Ollie Wright	(England) Bath City	End of season	
26 June 2023	DF	(England) Nico Lawrence	(England) Colchester United	25 January 2024	
11 July 2023	GK	(Poland) Mateusz Lis	(Turkey) Göztepe	End of season	
2 August 2023	DF	(Croatia) Duje Ćaleta-Car	(France) Lyon	End of season	
11 August 2023	DF	(England) Lewis Payne	(Wales) Newport County	End of season	
26 August 2023	DF	(England) Thierry Small	(Scotland) St Mirren	3 January 2024	
28 August 2023	DF	(France) Romain Perraud	(France) Nice	End of season	
29 August 2023	DF	(Brazil) Lyanco	(Qatar) Al-Gharafa	End of season	
31 August 2023	GK	(England) Jack Bycroft	(England) Aldershot Town	30 September 2023	
1 September 2023	FW	(England) Dom Ballard	(England) Reading	End of season	
1 September 2023	DF	(Germany) Armel Bella-Kotchap	(Netherlands) PSV	End of season	
1 September 2023	DF	(Northern Ireland) Matt Carson	(England) Braintree Town	30 September 2023	
1 September 2023	MF	(England) Ryan Finnigan	(England) Shrewsbury Town	31 January 2024	
1 September 2023	FW	(Republic of Ireland) Luke Pearce	(England) Torquay United	30 September 2023	
11 September 2023	FW	(Nigeria) Paul Onuachu	(Turkey) Trabzonspor	End of season	
7 October 2023	FW	(Republic of Ireland) Luke Pearce	(England) Weston-super-Mare	31 October 2023	
4 November 2023	GK	(England) Jack Bycroft	(England) Oxford City	31 December 2023	
17 November 2023	GK	(England) Josh McNamara	(England) St Albans City	31 December 2023	
17 November 2023	FW	(Republic of Ireland) Luke Pearce	(England) Dover Athletic	31 December 2023	
31 January 2024	MF	(Argentina) Carlos Alcaraz	(Italy) Juventus	End of season	
1 February 2024	DF	(England) Derrick Abu	(England) Harrogate Town	End of season	
29 March 2024	FW	(England) Will Merry	(England) Eastleigh	End of season	
29 March 2024	DF	(England) Jake Vokins	(England) Eastleigh	End of season	

Players released

Date	Pos.	Player	Subsequent club	Join date	Ref.
30 June 2023	DF	(England) Will Tizzard	(Scotland) Queen's Park	1 July 2023	
30 June 2023	MF	(England) Jack Turner	(Scotland) Queen's Park	1 July 2023	
30 June 2023	GK	(England) Matthew Hall	(England) Bristol Rovers	26 July 2023	
30 June 2023	MF	(Norway) Mohamed Elyounoussi	(Denmark) Copenhagen	27 July 2023	
30 June 2023	FW	(England) Sam Bellis	(England) Barrow	22 August 2023	
30 June 2023	MF	(Australia) Caleb Watts	(England) Exeter City	15 September 2023	
30 June 2023	DF	(England) Zuriel Otseh-Taiwo	(England) Potters Bar Town	20 November 2023	
30 June 2023	MF	(England) Fedel Ross-Lang	(Lithuania) FK Tauras	19 March 2024	
30 June 2023	MF	(Serbia) Goran Babić	(Serbia) Jedinstvo Ub	12 June 2024	
30 June 2023	DF	(France) Léon Pambou	Currently unattached		
30 June 2023	GK	(England) Jak Stewart	Currently unattached		
30 June 2023	GK	(Argentina) Willy Caballero	None (retired)		
30 June 2023	MF	(England) Theo Walcott	None (retired)		
30 August 2023	DF	(England) Sam Bailey	(England) Evesham United	2 August 2024	
1 February 2024	DF	(England) Thierry Small	(England) Charlton Athletic	2 February 2024	

== Pre-season and friendlies ==
Southampton announced their first pre-season fixture in June 2023, with the Saints travelling to Turkey to play fellow Sports Republic-owned side, Göztepe. On 26 June, a away pre-season fixture against Reading and a home pre-season fixture against Bournemouth was confirmed. A fourth friendly was announced on 3 July against AZ at St Mary's Stadium. A behind closed doors fixture was arranged on 12 July against Benfica at St George's Park National Football Centre.

Win Draw Loss Fixtures

12 July 2023 Friendly	Benfica	2–0	Southampton	Burton upon Trent
15:00 BST	Neres 11'; Ristić 45'	Report		Stadium: St George's Park National Football Centre; Attendance: Behind closed doors Referee: Sunny Gill

15 July 2023 Friendly	Göztepe	1–1	Southampton	Bornova, İzmir, Turkey
18:25 BST	Kayan 26'	Report	Alcaraz 64'	Stadium: Bornova Aziz Kocaoğlu Stadium; Attendance: 4,500

22 July 2023 Friendly	Reading	2–4	Southampton	Reading
15:00 BST	Knibbs 22'; Shodipo 89'	Report	Bednarek 2'; Ward-Prowse 9'; A. Armstrong 50'; Aribo 76'	Stadium: Madejski Stadium

25 July 2023 Friendly	Southampton	2–3	Bournemouth	Southampton
19:45 BST	Charles 44'; S. Armstrong 65'	Report	Ouattara 15'; Christie 17'; Brooks 86'	Stadium: St Mary's Stadium; Attendance: 13,049; Referee: James Linington

29 July 2023 Friendly	Southampton	0–1	AZ	Southampton
15:00 BST		Report	Lahdo 65'	Stadium: St Mary's Stadium; Attendance: 7,277; Referee: Keith Stroud

== Competitions ==
=== Overall record ===
Competition	First match	Last match	Starting round	Final position	Record							
Competition	First match	Last match	Starting round	Final position	Pld	W	D	L	GF	GA	GD	Win %
Championship	4 August 2023	4 May 2024	Matchday 1	4th	46	26	9	11	87	63	+24	56.52
Play-offs	12 May 2024	26 May 2024	Semi-finals	Winners	3	2	1	0	4	1	+3	66.67
FA Cup	6 January 2024	28 February 2024	Third round	Fifth round	4	2	1	1	8	4	+4	50.00
EFL Cup	8 August 2023		First round	First round	1	0	0	1	1	3	−2	0.00
Total					54	30	11	13	100	71	+29	55.56

Source: Soccerway

=== Championship ===
==== League table ====
Pos	Team	Pld	W	D	L	GF	GA	GD	Pts	Promotion, qualification or relegation
1	Leicester City (C, P)	46	31	4	11	89	41	+48	97	Promoted to the Premier League
2	Ipswich Town (P)	46	28	12	6	92	57	+35	96	Promoted to the Premier League
3	Leeds United	46	27	9	10	81	43	+38	90	Qualified for the Championship play-offs
4	Southampton (O, P)	46	26	9	11	87	63	+24	87	Qualified for the Championship play-offs
5	West Bromwich Albion	46	21	12	13	70	47	+23	75	Qualified for the Championship play-offs
6	Norwich City	46	21	10	15	79	64	+15	73	Qualified for the Championship play-offs
7	Hull City	46	19	13	14	68	60	+8	70	

Source: EFL official website
Rules for classification: 1) Points; 2) Goal difference; 3) Number of goals scored; 4) Head-to-head results; 5) Wins; 6) Away goals; 7) Penalty points (sec 9.5); 8) Number of 12-point sending off offences; 9) Play-off (only if needed to determine promotion/relegation)
(C) Champions; (O) Play-off winners; (P) Promoted

==== Results summary ====
Overall								Home						Away					
Pld	W	D	L	GF	GA	GD	Pts	W	D	L	GF	GA	GD	W	D	L	GF	GA	GD
46	26	9	11	87	63	+24	87	15	3	5	54	29	+25	11	6	6	33	34	−1

Source: Soccerway

==== Results by round ====
Round	1	2	3	4	5	6	7	8	9	10	11	12	13	14	15	16	17	18	19	20	21	22	23	24	25	26	27	28	29	30	31	32	33	34	35	36	37	38	39	40	41	42	43	44	45	46
Ground	A	H	A	H	A	H	H	A	H	A	H	A	A	H	A	H	A	H	H	A	A	H	A	H	H	A	H	A	A	H	A	A	H	H	A	H	H	A	A	H	H	H	A	A	H	A
Result	W	D	W	W	L	L	L	L	W	W	D	W	D	W	W	W	D	W	W	D	D	W	W	W	W	D	W	W	W	W	L	W	L	L	W	W	D	L	D	W	W	W	L	L	L	W
Position	5	6	5	4	7	9	13	15	10	10	10	5	5	4	4	4	4	4	4	4	4	4	4	3	3	3	3	3	2	2	3	3	4	4	4	4	4	4	4	4	4	4	4	4	4	4

Source: Soccerway
A = Away; H = Home; W = Win; D = Draw; L = Loss; P = Postponed

==== Matches ====
On 22 June, the EFL Championship fixtures were released.

Win Draw Loss Fixtures

4 August 2023 1	Sheffield Wednesday	1–2	Southampton	Owlerton
20:00 BST	Gregory 54'	Report	A. Armstrong 8'; Adams 87'	Stadium: Hillsborough Stadium; Attendance: 28,558; Referee: Bobby Madley
Note: Live on Sky Sports.

12 August 2023 2	Southampton	4–4	Norwich City	Southampton
15:00 BST	Bednarek 17'; A. Armstrong 21' (pen.), 90+7' (pen.); Adams 57'	Report	Sargent 7'; Sara 23'; Rowe 45+2'; Fassnacht 84'	Stadium: St Mary's Stadium; Attendance: 30,113; Referee: Darren England

19 August 2023 3	Plymouth Argyle	1–2	Southampton	Plymouth
12:30 BST	Hardie 51'	Report	Tella 49'; Adams 90+4'	Stadium: Home Park; Attendance: 16,392; Referee: David Webb
Note: Live on Sky Sports.

26 August 2023 4	Southampton	2–1	Queens Park Rangers	Southampton
15:00 BST	Edozie 30'; A. Armstrong 64'	Report	Colback 32'	Stadium: St Mary's Stadium; Attendance: 30,401; Referee: James Bell

2 September 2023 5	Sunderland	5–0	Southampton	Sunderland
12:30 BST	Clarke 1'; Ekwah 7', 45'; Dack 48'; Rigg 90+5'	Report		Stadium: Stadium of Light; Attendance: 41,459; Referee: David Coote
Note: Live on Sky Sports.

15 September 2023 6	Southampton	1–4	Leicester City	Southampton
20:00 BST	Edozie 25'	Report	Vardy 1'; McAteer 18'; Ndidi 45+3'; Mavididi 67'	Stadium: St Mary's Stadium; Attendance: 28,877; Referee: Robert Madley
Note: Live on Sky Sports.

19 September 2023 7	Southampton	0–1	Ipswich Town	Southampton
19:45 BST		Report	Hutchinson 30'	Stadium: St Mary's Stadium; Attendance: 27,265; Referee: Joshua Smith

23 September 2023 8	Middlesbrough	2–1	Southampton	Middlesbrough
15:00 BST	McGree 44'; Howson 65' (pen.)	Report	A. Armstrong 17'	Stadium: Riverside Stadium; Attendance: 26,141; Referee: Tim Robinson

30 September 2023 9	Southampton	3–1	Leeds United	Southampton
12:30 BST	A. Armstrong 2', 35'; Smallbone 31'	Report	Struijk 58'	Stadium: St Mary's Stadium; Attendance: 30,372; Referee: John Brooks
Note: Live on Sky Sports.

3 October 2023 10	Stoke City	0–1	Southampton	Stoke-on-Trent
20:00 BST		Report	S. Armstrong 41'	Stadium: Bet365 Stadium; Attendance: 20,002; Referee: James Bell
Note: Live on Sky Sports.

7 October 2023 11	Southampton	1–1	Rotherham United	Southampton
15:00 BST	S. Armstrong 2'	Report	Hugill 74'	Stadium: St Mary's Stadium; Attendance: 28,404; Referee: John Busby

21 October 2023 12	Hull City	1–2	Southampton	Kingston upon Hull
15:00 BST	Delap 25'	Report	Smallbone 20'; Fraser 90+5'	Stadium: MKM Stadium; Attendance: 21,524; Referee: Geoff Eltringham

25 October 2023 13	Preston North End	2–2	Southampton	Preston
19:45 BST	Osmajić 52'; Potts 55'	Report	Walker-Peters 33'; Evans 90+6' (o.g.)	Stadium: Deepdale; Attendance: 15,346; Referee: Jeremy Simpson
Note: Live on Sky Sports.

28 October 2023 14	Southampton	3–1	Birmingham City	Southampton
12:30 BST	Harwood-Bellis 9'; Alcaraz 22'; A. Armstrong 86'	Report	Stansfield 58'	Stadium: St Mary's Stadium; Attendance: 28,924; Referee: David Webb
Note: Live on Sky Sports.

4 November 2023 15	Millwall	0–1	Southampton	Bermondsey
15:00 GMT		Report	Fraser 90+3'	Stadium: The Den; Attendance: 18,905; Referee: James Linington

11 November 2023 16	Southampton	2–1	West Bromwich Albion	Southampton
15:00 GMT	Smallbone 5'; A. Armstrong 79'	Report	Bartley 65'	Stadium: St Mary's Stadium; Attendance: 30,160; Referee: Tom Nield

25 November 2023 17	Huddersfield Town	1–1	Southampton	Huddersfield
15:00 GMT	Jackson 87'	Report	A. Armstrong 45+1'	Stadium: Kirklees Stadium; Attendance: 19,387; Referee: David Webb

29 November 2023 18	Southampton	1–0	Bristol City	Southampton
19:45 GMT	Walker-Peters 47'	Report		Stadium: St Mary's Stadium; Attendance: 28,047; Referee: Keith Stroud
Note: Live on Sky Sports.

2 December 2023 19	Southampton	2–0	Cardiff City	Southampton
15:00 GMT	A. Armstrong 11', 15'	Report		Stadium: St Mary's Stadium; Attendance: 28,659; Referee: James Bell

9 December 2023 20	Watford	1–1	Southampton	Watford
15:00 GMT	Healey 90+6'	Report	Adams 56'	Stadium: Vicarage Road; Attendance: 19,797; Referee: Geoff Eltringham

13 December 2023 21	Coventry City	1–1	Southampton	Coventry
19:45 GMT	Wright 50'	Report	Edozie 67'	Stadium: Coventry Building Society Arena; Attendance: 23,996; Referee: Ben Toner
Note: Live on Sky Sports.

16 December 2023 22	Southampton	4–0	Blackburn Rovers	Southampton
15:00 GMT	Edozie 44'; S. Armstrong 64'; Mara 90+7'; Alcaraz 90+9'	Report		Stadium: St Mary's Stadium; Attendance: 27,545; Referee: Graham Scott

23 December 2023 23	Queens Park Rangers	0–1	Southampton	Shepherd's Bush
15:00 GMT		Report	Harwood-Bellis 42'	Stadium: Loftus Road; Attendance: 17,745; Referee: Oliver Langford

26 December 2023 24	Southampton	5–0	Swansea City	Southampton
15:00 GMT	Aribo 17'; Edozie 48'; Fraser 74', 87'; Adams 90+3'	Report		Stadium: St Mary's Stadium; Attendance: 30,279; Referee: Keith Stroud

29 December 2023 25	Southampton	2–1	Plymouth Argyle	Southampton
18:00 GMT	Alcaraz 56'; Adams 63'	Report	Hardie 90+1'	Stadium: St Mary's Stadium; Attendance: 30,559; Referee: James Linington
Note: Live on Sky Sports.

1 January 2024 26	Norwich City	1–1	Southampton	Norwich
15:00 GMT	Sargent 78'	Report	A. Armstrong 70'	Stadium: Carrow Road; Attendance: 26,467; Referee: Darren England

13 January 2024 27	Southampton	4–0	Sheffield Wednesday	Southampton
15:00 GMT	Adams 35'; A. Armstrong 63'; Fraser 75'; Mara 85'	Report		Stadium: St Mary's Stadium; Attendance: 30,189; Referee: Lewis Smith

20 January 2024 28	Swansea City	1–3	Southampton	Landore
12:30 GMT	Paterson 40'	Report	Adams 6'; Smallbone 20'; Downes 45'	Stadium: Swansea.com Stadium; Attendance: 17,356; Referee: Oliver Langford
Note: Live on Sky Sports.

3 February 2024 29	Rotherham United	0–2	Southampton	Rotherham
15:00 GMT		Report	Bednarek 4'; A. Armstrong 38'	Stadium: New York Stadium; Attendance: 11,179; Referee: Sunny Gill

10 February 2024 30	Southampton	5–3	Huddersfield Town	Southampton
15:00 GMT	Rothwell 49', 50'; Lees 80' (o.g.); Mara 84'; Edozie 90'	Report	Thomas 36'; Kasumu 45'; Matos 65'	Stadium: St Mary's Stadium; Attendance: 29,863; Referee: David Webb

13 February 2024 31	Bristol City	3–1	Southampton	Bristol
20:00 GMT	Bell 52'; Dickie 72'; Cornick 82'	Report	A. Armstrong 90+5' (pen.)	Stadium: Ashton Gate; Attendance: 24,661; Referee: Matt Donohue
Note: Live on Sky Sports.

16 February 2024 32	West Bromwich Albion	0–2	Southampton	West Bromwich
20:00 GMT		Report	Fraser 14'; Brooks 73'	Stadium: The Hawthorns; Attendance: 25,066; Referee: Sam Allison
Note: Live on Sky Sports.

20 February 2024 33	Southampton	1–2	Hull City	Southampton
19:45 GMT	Aribo 88'	Report	Zaroury 11'; Carvalho 36'	Stadium: St Mary's Stadium; Attendance: 26,834; Referee: Oliver Langford

24 February 2024 34	Southampton	1–2	Millwall	Southampton
15:00 GMT	Adams 34'	Report	Tanganga 5'; Flemming 44' (pen.)	Stadium: St Mary's Stadium; Attendance: 30,629; Referee: Thomas Bramall

2 March 2024 35	Birmingham City	3–4	Southampton	Bordesley
15:00 BST	Miyoshi 2'; Stansfield 41'; Bacuna 77'	Report	A. Armstrong 18'; Brooks 55'; Adams 59'; Aribo 90+6'	Stadium: St Andrew's; Attendance: 21,611; Referee: James Bell

9 March 2024 36	Southampton	4–2	Sunderland	Southampton
15:00 BST	S. Armstrong 9'; A. Armstrong 37' (pen.); Rothwell 77', 80'	Report	Mundle 62'; Bellingham 71'	Stadium: St Mary's Stadium; Attendance: 30,869; Referee: Stuart Attwell

29 March 2024 37	Southampton	1–1	Middlesbrough	Southampton
15:00 GMT	A. Armstrong 12'	Report	Latte Lath 90'	Stadium: St Mary's Stadium; Attendance: 30,470; Referee: Matt Donohue

1 April 2024 38	Ipswich Town	3–2	Southampton	Ipswich
17:30 BST	Davis 13'; Broadhead 68'; Sarmiento 90+7'	Report	Adams 14'; A. Armstrong 23'	Stadium: Portman Road; Attendance: 29,393; Referee: Michael Salisbury
Note: Live on Sky Sports.

6 April 2024 39	Blackburn Rovers	0–0	Southampton	Blackburn
15:00 BST		Report		Stadium: Ewood Park; Referee: Craig Pawson

9 April 2024 40	Southampton	2–1	Coventry City	Southampton
19:45 BST	Adams 18', 38'	Report	Bidwell 68'	Stadium: St Mary's Stadium; Attendance: 28,564; Referee: James Linington
Note: Live on Sky Sports.

13 April 2024 41	Southampton	3–2	Watford	Southampton
15:00 BST	Smallbone 1'; Adams 20'; Downes 90+9'	Report	Porteous 34'; Koné 85'	Stadium: St Mary's Stadium; Attendance: 30,347; Referee: Josh Smith

16 April 2024 42	Southampton	3–0	Preston North End	Southampton
20:00 BST	Adams 19', 29'; S. Armstrong 33'	Report		Stadium: St Mary's Stadium; Attendance: 27,636; Referee: Sam Barrott
Note: Live on Sky Sports.

20 April 2024 43	Cardiff City	2–1	Southampton	Cardiff
15:00 BST	Diédhiou 68'; Ashford 90+6'	Report	Aribo 12'	Stadium: Cardiff City Stadium; Attendance: 22,372; Referee: Oliver Langford

23 April 2024 44	Leicester City	5–0	Southampton	Leicester
19:45 BST	Fatawu 25', 75', 81'; Ndidi 62'; Vardy 79'	Report		Stadium: King Power Stadium; Attendance: 31,872; Referee: Bobby Madley
Note: Live on Sky Sports.

27 April 2024 45	Southampton	0–1	Stoke City	Southampton
15:00 BST		Report	Campbell 36'	Stadium: St Mary's Stadium; Attendance: 30,584; Referee: David Webb

4 May 2024 46	Leeds United	1–2	Southampton	Leeds
12:30 BST	Piroe 21'	Report	A. Armstrong 18'; Smallbone 35'	Stadium: Elland Road; Attendance: 36,766; Referee: Matthew Donohue
Note: Live on Sky Sports.

==== Play-offs ====
Southampton finished 4th in the regular season and were drawn against West Bromwich Albion.

12 May 2024 Semi final - Leg 1	West Bromwich Albion	0–0	Southampton	West Bromwich
14:15 GMT		Report		Stadium: The Hawthorns; Attendance: 25,367; Referee: Sam Barrott
Note: Live on Sky Sports.

17 May 2024 Semi final - Leg 2	Southampton	3–1 (3–1 agg.)	West Bromwich Albion	Southampton
20:00 GMT	Smallbone 49'; A. Armstrong 78', 86' (pen.)	Report	Kipré 90+7'	Stadium: St Mary's Stadium; Attendance: 30,712; Referee: Tim Robinson
Note: Live on Sky Sports.

26 May 2024 Final	Leeds United	0–1	Southampton	London
15:00 BST		Report	A. Armstrong 24'	Stadium: Wembley Stadium; Attendance: 85,862; Referee: John Brooks
Note: Live on Sky Sports.

=== FA Cup ===
As a Championship side, the Saints entered the FA Cup in the third round and were drawn at home against the winners of the tie between Alfreton Town or Walsall. In the fourth round they were drawn away to Watford.

Win Draw Loss Fixtures

6 January 2024 Third round	Southampton	4–0	Walsall	Southampton
15:00 GMT	Fraser 6', 68'; Mara 58'; Adams 78'	Report		Stadium: St Mary's Stadium; Attendance: 22,627; Referee: David Webb

28 January 2024 Fourth round	Watford	1–1	Southampton	Watford
14:00 GMT	Martins 5'	Report	S. Armstrong 89'	Stadium: Vicarage Road; Attendance: 16,688; Referee: Michael Salisbury

6 February 2024 Fourth round replay	Southampton	3–0	Watford	Southampton
19:45 GMT	Mara 52', 58'; Adams 76'	Report		Stadium: St Mary's Stadium; Attendance: 17,844; Referee: Darren Bond

28 February 2024 Fifth round	Liverpool	3–0	Southampton	Liverpool
19:45 GMT	Koumas 44'; Danns 73', 88'	Report		Stadium: Anfield; Attendance: 59,782; Referee: Craig Pawson
Note: Live on ITV.

=== EFL Cup ===
Southampton were drawn away to Gillingham in the first round.

Win Draw Loss Fixtures

8 August 2023 First round	Gillingham	3–1	Southampton	Gillingham
19:45 BST	Nadesan 12'; McKenzie 51', 67'	Report	Alcaraz 89'	Stadium: Priestfield Stadium; Attendance: 7,775; Referee: Carl Brook

== Squad statistics ==
As of 27 May 2024

No.	Pos.	Nat.	Name	League				Playoffs				FA Cup				EFL Cup				Total			
No.	Pos.	Nat.	Name	Apps.	Goals	Yellow card	Red card	Apps.	Goals	Yellow card	Red card	Apps.	Goals	Yellow card	Red card	Apps.	Goals	Yellow card	Red card	Apps.	Goals	Yellow card	Red card
1	GK	(England)	Alex McCarthy	5	0	0	0	3	0	0	0	0	0	0	0	1	0	0	0	9	0	0	0
2	DF	(England)	Kyle Walker-Peters	43	2	4	0	3	0	0	0	0(1)	0	0	0	0	0	0	0	46(1)	2	4	0
3	DF	(Republic of Ireland)	Ryan Manning	29(8)	0	9	0	1(2)	0	0	0	1	0	1	0	0	0	0	0	31(10)	0	10	0
4	MF	(England)	Flynn Downes	31(2)	2	9	0	3	0	2	0	1	0	0	0	0	0	0	0	35(2)	2	11	0
5	DF	(England)	Jack Stephens	17(6)	0	7	0	3	0	0	0	4	0	0	0	0	0	0	0	24(6)	0	7	0
7	MF	(Nigeria)	Joe Aribo	16(19)	4	5	0	3	0	1	0	1	0	0	0	0(1)	0	0	0	20(20)	4	6	0
9	FW	(England)	Adam Armstrong	44(2)	21	5	0	3	3	0	0	0(3)	0	1	0	0	0	0	0	47(5)	24	6	0
10	FW	(Scotland)	Ché Adams	25(15)	16	5	0	0(1)	0	1	0	2(2)	2	0	0	1	0	0	0	28(18)	18	6	0
11	FW	(Scotland)	Ross Stewart	0(3)	0	0	0	0(1)	0	0	0	0	0	0	0	0	0	0	0	0(4)	0	0	0
13	GK	(England)	Joe Lumley	0	0	0	0	0	0	0	0	4	0	0	0	0	0	0	0	4	0	0	0
14	DF	(England)	James Bree	13(6)	0	0	1	0	0	0	0	1	0	0	0	1	0	0	0	15(6)	0	0	1
16	MF	(Republic of Ireland)	Will Smallbone	35(8)	6	8	0	3	1	0	0	2(2)	0	1	0	0	0	0	0	40(10)	7	9	0
17	MF	(Scotland)	Stuart Armstrong	33(9)	5	6	0	0	0	0	0	0(2)	1	0	0	1	0	0	0	34(11)	6	6	0
18	FW	(France)	Sékou Mara	4(24)	3	1	0	1	0	0	0	4	3	0	0	1	0	0	0	10(24)	6	1	0
19	MF	(England)	Joe Rothwell	4(12)	4	2	0	0(1)	0	0	0	3	0	0	0	0	0	0	0	7(13)	4	2	0
20	MF	(Ghana)	Kamaldeen Sulemana	10(15)	0	4	1	0	0	0	0	1	0	0	0	0	0	0	0	11(15)	0	4	1
21	DF	(England)	Taylor Harwood-Bellis	40	2	3	0	3	0	2	0	2(1)	0	0	0	0	0	0	0	45(1)	2	5	0
23	MF	(England)	Samuel Edozie	16(16)	6	2	0	0(2)	0	0	0	1(1)	0	1	0	0	0	0	0	17(19)	6	3	0
24	MF	(Northern Ireland)	Shea Charles	15(17)	0	5	1	0(1)	0	0	0	4	0	0	0	1	0	1	0	20(18)	0	6	1
26	MF	(Scotland)	Ryan Fraser	13(26)	6	5	0	2(1)	0	1	0	1(1)	2	0	0	0	0	0	0	16(28)	8	6	0
27	MF	(England)	Sam Amo-Ameyaw	1(2)	0	0	0	0	0	0	0	1(2)	0	1	0	1	0	0	0	3(4)	0	1	0
28	DF	(Spain)	Juan Larios	0	0	0	0	0	0	0	0	0	0	0	0	0	0	0	0	0	0	0	0
29	DF	(England)	Jayden Meghoma	0	0	0	0	0	0	0	0	3	0	0	0	1	0	0	0	4	0	0	0
30	DF	(England)	Nico Lawrence	0	0	0	0	0	0	0	0	0	0	0	0	0	0	0	0	0	0	0	0
31	GK	(Republic of Ireland)	Gavin Bazunu	41	0	1	0	0	0	0	0	0	0	0	0	0	0	0	0	41	0	1	0
33	MF	(England)	Tyler Dibling	0(1)	0	0	0	0	0	0	0	2(1)	0	1	0	0(1)	0	0	0	2(3)	0	1	0
35	DF	(Poland)	Jan Bednarek	39(3)	2	11	0	3	0	1	0	2	0	0	0	0	0	0	0	44(3)	2	13	0
36	MF	(Wales)	David Brooks	11(6)	2	2	0	2(1)	0	0	0	0	0	0	0	0	0	0	0	13(7)	2	2	0
40	MF	(England)	Cam Bragg	0	0	0	0	0	0	0	0	0(2)	0	0	0	0	0	0	0	0(2)	0	0	0
Players with appearances who ended the season on loan
12	FW	(Nigeria)	Paul Onuachu	0	0	0	0	0	0	0	0	0	0	0	0	0(1)	0	0	0	0(1)	0	0	0
15	DF	(France)	Romain Perraud	0	0	0	0	0	0	0	0	0	0	0	0	1	0	1	0	1	0	1	0
22	MF	(Argentina)	Carlos Alcaraz	14(9)	3	4	0	0	0	0	0	2	0	1	0	0(1)	1	0	0	16(10)	4	5	0
25	DF	(Brazil)	Lyanco	0	0	0	0	0	0	0	0	0	0	0	0	1	0	1	0	1	0	1	0
Players with appearances who left during the season
6	DF	(England)	Mason Holgate	4(1)	0	1	0	0	0	0	0	2	0	1	0	0	0	0	0	6(1)	0	1	0
8	MF	(England)	James Ward-Prowse	1	0	0	0	0	0	0	0	0	0	0	0	0	0	0	0	1	0	0	0
11	MF	(England)	Nathan Tella	3	1	2	0	0	0	0	0	0	0	0	0	0	0	0	0	3	1	2	0
19	MF	(Mali)	Moussa Djenepo	0	0	0	0	0	0	0	0	0	0	0	0	1	0	0	0	1	0	0	0
32	MF	(England)	Kamari Doyle	0	0	0	0	0	0	0	0	0	0	0	0	0(1)	0	0	0	0(1)	0	0	0

=== Most appearances ===
As of 27 May 2024

#	Pos.	Nat.	Name	League		Playoffs		FA Cup		EFL Cup		Total		
#	Pos.	Nat.	Name	Starts	Subs	Starts	Subs	Starts	Subs	Starts	Subs	Starts	Subs	Total
1	FW	(England)	Adam Armstrong	44	2	3	0	0	3	0	0	47	5	52
2	MF	(Republic of Ireland)	Will Smallbone	35	8	3	0	2	2	0	0	40	10	50
3	DF	(England)	Kyle Walker-Peters	43	0	3	0	0	1	0	0	46	1	47
3	DF	(Poland)	Jan Bednarek	39	3	3	0	2	0	0	0	44	3	47
5	DF	(England)	Taylor Harwood-Bellis	40	0	3	0	2	1	0	0	45	1	46
5	FW	(Scotland)	Ché Adams	25	15	0	1	2	2	1	0	28	18	46
7	MF	(Scotland)	Stuart Armstrong	33	9	0	0	0	2	1	0	34	11	45
8	MF	(Scotland)	Ryan Fraser	13	26	2	1	1	1	0	0	16	28	44
9	GK	(Republic of Ireland)	Gavin Bazunu	41	0	0	0	0	0	0	0	41	0	41
9	DF	(Republic of Ireland)	Ryan Manning	29	8	1	2	1	0	0	0	31	10	41

=== Top goalscorers ===
As of 27 May 2024

#	Pos.	Nat.	Name	League		Playoffs		FA Cup		EFL Cup		Total		
#	Pos.	Nat.	Name	Goals	Apps.	Goals	Apps.	Goals	Apps.	Goals	Apps.	Goals	Apps.	GPG
1	FW	(England)	Adam Armstrong	21	46	3	3	0	3	0	0	24	52	0.46
2	FW	(Scotland)	Ché Adams	16	40	0	1	2	4	0	1	18	46	0.39
3	MF	(Scotland)	Ryan Fraser	6	39	0	3	2	2	0	0	8	44	0.18
4	MF	(Republic of Ireland)	Will Smallbone	6	43	1	3	0	4	0	0	7	50	0.14
5	FW	(France)	Sékou Mara	3	28	0	1	3	4	0	1	6	34	0.18
5	MF	(England)	Samuel Edozie	6	32	0	2	0	2	0	0	6	36	0.17
5	MF	(Scotland)	Stuart Armstrong	5	42	0	0	1	2	0	1	6	45	0.13
8	MF	(England)	Joe Rothwell	4	16	0	1	0	3	0	0	4	20	0.20
8	MF	(Argentina)	Carlos Alcaraz	3	23	0	0	0	2	1	1	4	26	0.15
8	MF	(Nigeria)	Joe Aribo	4	35	0	3	0	1	0	1	4	40	0.10
