= Nico Lawrence =

English footballer (born 2003)

Personal information
- Date of birth: 22 November 2003 (age 22)
- Height: 6 ft 1 in (1.85 m)
- Position: Centre-back

Youth career
- Fulham
- Crystal Palace
- Sutton United
- Kinetic Academy

Senior career*
Years	Team	Apps	(Gls)
2022	Glebe	6	(1)
2022–2025	Southampton	0	(0)
2023	→ Torquay United (loan)	20	(0)
2023–2024	→ Colchester United (loan)	4	(0)
2024–2025	→ Milton Keynes Dons (loan)	22	(0)
2025–2026	York City	0	(0)
2026	Farnborough	7	(1)
- * Club domestic league appearances and goals as of 21:16, 11 May 2026 (UTC)

Nico Lawrence (born 22 November 2003) is an English professional footballer who plays as a centre-back.

== Career ==
=== Early career ===
Growing up, Lawrence had spells with Fulham, Crystal Palace and Sutton United. He later joined London-based Kinetic Academy and combined that with playing for Southern Counties East Football League side Glebe. He made six league appearances for Glebe.

=== Southampton ===
In February 2022, he joined Premier League club Southampton on an 18-month contract following a successful trial. In January 2023, he extended his contract with Southampton until June 2025 and joined National League side Torquay United on loan. At Torquay, he won the Young Player of the Year award.

He joined Colchester United on loan in June 2023. On 9 August 2023, he made his professional debut as a half-time substitute in the EFL Cup match against Cardiff City. During a 3–0 victory against Gillingham, Lawrence suffered ankle ligament damage and was expected to be sidelined for several months. On 25 January 2024, he was recalled to Southampton from loan. On 18 April 2024, Lawrence signed a new two-year contract.

On 2 August 2024, Lawrence joined Milton Keynes Dons on a season-long loan. He made his debut for the club on 10 August 2024 in a 2–1 home defeat against Bradford City. The loan spell was cut short before the end of the season with Lawrence returning to action for Southampton U21 in April 2025.

On 1 September 2025, Southampton announced that Lawrence had left the club to help him facilitate a move back into senior football.

=== Non-League ===
On 6 November 2025, Lawrence joined National League side York City. On 4 January 2026, he departed by mutual consent having made one appearance in the FA Trophy.

On 17 March 2026, Lawrence joined National League South side Farnborough.

After leaving Farnborough, Lawrence joined League One side Wigan Athletic on trial in July 2026.

== Career statistics ==
As of 25 April 2026

Appearances and goals by club, season and competition
Club	Season	League			National Cup		League Cup		Other		Total	
Club	Season	Division	Apps	Goals	Apps	Goals	Apps	Goals	Apps	Goals	Apps	Goals
Glebe	2021–22	Southern Counties East	6	1	0	0	—		—		6	1
Southampton	2022–23	Premier League	0	0	0	0	0	0	—		0	0
Southampton	2023–24	Championship	0	0	0	0	0	0	—		0	0
Southampton	2024–25	Premier League	0	0	0	0	0	0	—		0	0
Southampton	Total		0	0	0	0	0	0	—		0	0
Torquay United (loan)	2022–23	National League	20	0	—		—		—		20	0
Colchester United (loan)	2023–24	League Two	4	0	0	0	1	0	0	0	5	0
Milton Keynes Dons (loan)	2024–25	League Two	22	0	0	0	0	0	0	0	22	0
York City	2025–26	National League	0	0	0	0	—		1 (Note: Appearance in FA Trophy)	0	1	0
Farnborough	2025–26	National League South	7	1	—		—		—		7	1
Career total			59	2	0	0	1	0	1	0	61	2

== Honours ==
- Torquay United Young Player of the Season: 2022–23
