= Juan Larios =

Spanish footballer (born 2004)

Personal information
- Full name: Juan Larios López
- Date of birth: 12 January 2004 (age 22)
- Place of birth: Tomares, Spain
- Height: 1.70 m (5 ft 7 in)
- Position: Left-back

Team information
- Current team: Eldense

Youth career
- 2009–2011: Tomares
- 2011–2016: Sevilla
- 2016–2020: Barcelona
- 2020–2022: Manchester City

Senior career*
Years	Team	Apps	(Gls)
2022–2026	Southampton	5	(0)
2025–2026	→ Cultural Leonesa (loan)	10	(0)
2026	→ Zaragoza (loan)	17	(0)
2026–	Eldense	9	(0)

International career
2018–2019	Spain U15	6	(0)
2021	Spain U18	3	(0)
2022	Spain U19	3	(0)
- * Club domestic league appearances and goals as of 06:01, 10 November 2026 (UTC)

Juan Larios López (born 12 January 2004) is a Spanish professional footballer who plays as a left-back for Segunda División club Eldense.

Larios is a product of the Manchester City academy. In August 2022, he joined Southampton. He has had loan spells at Cultural Leonesa and Zaragoza. Larios has represented his country at youth level.

== Club career ==
=== Early career ===
Born in Tomares, Seville, Andalusia, Larios came through youth academies of Tomares, Sevilla and La Masia academy at Barcelona. He moved to England to join up with Manchester City in 2020, initially playing for their under-18 team. He made 32 appearances for City's age group sides, as well as playing in the Papa John's Trophy and had played every match for the City under-21 team from the beginning of the 2022–23 season up to the end of the August transfer window.

=== Southampton ===
On 31 August 2022, Manchester City accepted offers from fellow Premier League club Southampton for Larios and his teammate Sam Edozie. They were the third and fourth players to move from the City youth team to Southampton in the summer of 2022, following in the footsteps of Gavin Bazunu and Romeo Lavia. Southampton had that summer hired Joe Shields to be their head of recruitment, having previously held the position of head of youth recruitment at Manchester City. It was reported that the fee for Larios that City received from Southampton was £6 million pounds and contains a 20% sell on clause, a buy-back clause, and an option to match any future offer received for Larios. Southampton manager Ralph Hasenhüttl praised Larios for his positional versatility, able to cover either flank, upon his announcement as a Southampton player. Two days after the move, Larios was an unused substitute for Southampton during a 1–0 loss at Wolverhampton Wanderers in the Premier League. He made his Premier League debut on 16 September 2022 for Southampton away at Aston Villa.

On 4 July 2025, Larios joined Cultural Leonesa on a season-long loan. On 16 January 2026, he was recalled from loan and returned to Southampton. On 2 February 2026, Larios joined Real Zaragoza on loan for the remainder of the 2025–26 season.

On 1 September 2026, Larios left Southampton following a mutual termination of his contract.

=== Eldense ===
On 3 September 2026, Larios signed a two-year deal with CD Eldense, also in the Spanish second division.

== International career ==
Larios is a youth international for Spain, having played for the Spain U15s, Spain U18s, and Spain U19s.

== Career statistics ==
=== Club ===
As of match played 9 November 2026

Appearances and goals by club, season and competition
Club	Season	League			National cup (Note: Includes FA Cup, Copa del Rey)		League cup (Note: Includes League Cup)		Other (Note: Includes EFL Trophy)		Total	
Club	Season	Division	Apps	Goals	Apps	Goals	Apps	Goals	Apps	Goals	Apps	Goals
Manchester City U21	2021–22	—			—		—		2	0	2	0
Manchester City U21	2022–23	—			—		—		1	0	1	0
Manchester City U21	Total		—		—		—		3	0	3	0
Southampton	2022–23	Premier League	5	0	0	0	0	0	—		5	0
Southampton	2023–24	Championship	0	0	0	0	0	0	0	0	0	0
Southampton	2024–25	Premier League	0	0	0	0	1	0	—		1	0
Southampton	2025–26	Championship	0	0	0	0	0	0	—		0	0
Southampton	2026–27	Championship	0	0	0	0	0	0	—		0	0
Southampton	Total		5	0	0	0	1	0	0	0	6	0
Cultural Leonesa (loan)	2025–26	Segunda División	10	0	3	0	—		—		13	0
Real Zaragoza (loan)	2025–26	Segunda División	17	0	0	0	—		—		17	0
Eldense	2026–27	Segunda División	9	0	1	0	—		—		10	0
Career total			41	0	4	0	1	0	3	0	49	0
