= 2022–23 Southampton F.C. season =

Southampton
2022–23 season
- Owner: Sport Republic
- Manager: Ralph Hasenhüttl (until 7 November); Nathan Jones (from 10 November to 12 February); Rubén Sellés (from 12 February)
- Stadium: St Mary's Stadium
- Premier League: 20th (relegated)
- FA Cup: Fifth round
- EFL Cup: Semi-finals
- Top goalscorer: League: James Ward-Prowse (9); All: James Ward-Prowse (11)
- Highest home attendance: 31,196 v Manchester United (27 August 2022)
- Lowest home attendance: 17,385 v Lincoln City (20 December 2022)
- Average home league attendance: 30,416
Home colours	Away colours	Third colours

The 2022–23 season was the 106th season in the existence of Southampton Football Club and the club's eleventh consecutive season in the Premier League. In addition to the league, they also competed in the FA Cup and the EFL Cup.

Ralph Hasenhüttl was sacked on 7 November 2022 due to a poor start to the season, which saw Southampton dragged into the relegation zone. He was replaced with Luton Town manager Nathan Jones. However, after losing nine of 14 games in charge, Jones was sacked as the team dropped to the bottom of the league. Rubén Sellés took charge until the end of the season, and despite victories over Chelsea and fellow strugglers Leicester City, he was unable to keep Southampton in the Premier League. On 13 May 2023, Southampton's eleven-year stay in the top flight came to an end after a 2–0 home loss to Fulham resulted in their relegation to the EFL Championship.

== Squad ==
N	Pos.	Nat.	Name	Age	Since	App	Goals	Ends	Transfer fee	Notes
1	GK	(England)	Alex McCarthy	33	2016	138	0	2024	Undisclosed	
2	DF	(England)	Kyle Walker-Peters	26	2020	120	4	2025	Undisclosed	
3	MF	(England)	Ainsley Maitland-Niles	25	2022	26	0	2023	Loan	
4	DF	(Brazil)	Lyanco	26	2021	48	1	2025	Undisclosed	
6	DF	(Croatia)	Duje Ćaleta-Car	26	2022	19	2	2026	Undisclosed	
7	MF	(Nigeria)	Joe Aribo	26	2022	27	2	2026	Undisclosed	
8	MF	(England)	James Ward-Prowse	28	2003	409	55	2026	Academy	Captain
9	FW	(England)	Adam Armstrong	26	2021	67	5	2025	Undisclosed	
10	FW	(Scotland)	Ché Adams	26	2019	145	31	2024	Undisclosed	
11	MF	(Croatia)	Mislav Oršić	30	2023	5	0	2025	Undisclosed	
12	FW	(Nigeria)	Paul Onuachu	29	2023	11	0	2026	Undisclosed	
13	GK	(Argentina)	Willy Caballero	41	2021	5	0	2023	Free transfer	
14	DF	(England)	James Bree	25	2023	6	0	2026	Undisclosed	
15	DF	(France)	Romain Perraud	25	2021	59	5	2025	Undisclosed	
17	MF	(Scotland)	Stuart Armstrong	31	2018	169	19	2024	£7M	
18	FW	(France)	Sékou Mara	20	2022	30	2	2026	Undisclosed	
19	MF	(Mali)	Moussa Djenepo	24	2019	90	5	2025	Undisclosed	
20	MF	(Ghana)	Kamaldeen Sulemana	21	2023	18	2	2027	Undisclosed	
21	DF	(England)	Tino Livramento	20	2021	34	1	2026	Undisclosed	
22	DF	(Ghana)	Mohammed Salisu	24	2020	80	1	2024	Undisclosed	
23	MF	(England)	Samuel Edozie	20	2022	24	0	2027	Undisclosed	
24	MF	(Norway)	Mohamed Elyounoussi	28	2018	90	9	2023	Undisclosed	
26	MF	(Argentina)	Carlos Alcaraz	20	2023	21	4	2027	Undisclosed	
27	MF	(France)	Ibrahima Diallo	24	2020	81	1	2024	Undisclosed	
28	DF	(Spain)	Juan Larios	19	2022	5	0	2027	Undisclosed	
31	GK	(Republic of Ireland)	Gavin Bazunu	21	2022	37	0	2027	Undisclosed	
32	MF	(England)	Theo Walcott	34	2021	82	10	2023	Free transfer	
35	DF	(Poland)	Jan Bednarek	27	2017	173	7	2025	Undisclosed	
37	DF	(Germany)	Armel Bella-Kotchap	21	2022	26	0	2026	Undisclosed	
45	MF	(Belgium)	Roméo Lavia	19	2022	34	1	2027	Undisclosed	

== Transfers ==
Players transferred in

Date	Pos.	Player	Club	Fee	Ref.
17 June 2022	GK	(Republic of Ireland) Gavin Bazunu	(England) Manchester City	Undisclosed	
17 June 2022	GK	(Poland) Mateusz Lis	(Turkey) Altay	Free transfer	
21 June 2022	DF	(Germany) Armel Bella-Kotchap	(Germany) VfL Bochum	Undisclosed	
6 July 2022	MF	(Belgium) Roméo Lavia	(England) Manchester City	Undisclosed	
9 July 2022	MF	(Nigeria) Joe Aribo	(Scotland) Rangers	Undisclosed	
25 July 2022	FW	(France) Sékou Mara	(France) Bordeaux	Undisclosed	
1 September 2022	DF	(Croatia) Duje Ćaleta-Car	(France) Marseille	Undisclosed	
1 September 2022	MF	(England) Samuel Edozie	(England) Manchester City	Undisclosed	
1 September 2022	DF	(Spain) Juan Larios	(England) Manchester City	Undisclosed	
27 September 2022	GK	(England) Jak Stewart	(England) Everton	Free transfer	
6 January 2023	MF	(Croatia) Mislav Oršić	(Croatia) Dinamo Zagreb	Undisclosed	
11 January 2023	MF	(Argentina) Carlos Alcaraz	(Argentina) Racing Club	Undisclosed	
26 January 2023	DF	(England) James Bree	(England) Luton Town	Undisclosed	
31 January 2023	FW	(Nigeria) Paul Onuachu	(Belgium) Genk	Undisclosed	
31 January 2023	MF	(Ghana) Kamaldeen Sulemana	(France) Rennes	Undisclosed	

Players loaned in

Date	Pos.	Player	Club	Duration	Ref.
1 September 2022	MF	(England) Ainsley Maitland-Niles	(England) Arsenal	End of season	

Players transferred out

Date	Pos.	Player	Club	Fee	Ref.
9 August 2022	MF	(Republic of Ireland) Will Ferry	(England) Cheltenham Town	Undisclosed	
13 August 2022	DF	(England) Kayne Ramsay	(England) Harrogate Town	Undisclosed	
1 September 2022	MF	(Spain) Oriol Romeu	(Spain) Girona	Undisclosed	
1 September 2022	DF	(Tunisia) Yan Valery	(France) Angers	Undisclosed	
8 September 2022	MF	(England) Nathan Redmond	(Turkey) Beşiktaş	Undisclosed	

Players loaned out

Date	Pos.	Player	Club	Duration	Ref.
23 June 2022	MF	(Australia) Caleb Watts	(England) Morecambe	End of season	
27 June 2022	FW	(Belgium) Kazeem Olaigbe	(Scotland) Ross County	31 January 2023	
4 July 2022	FW	(England) Dan Nlundulu	(England) Cheltenham Town	8 January 2023	
23 July 2022	MF	(Republic of Ireland) Will Smallbone	(England) Stoke City	End of season	
26 July 2022	MF	(South Africa) Kegs Chauke	(England) Exeter City	End of season	
26 July 2022	DF	(England) Thierry Small	(England) Port Vale	31 December 2022	
4 August 2022	GK	(England) Jack Bycroft	(England) Taunton Town	End of season	
11 August 2022	MF	(England) Nathan Tella	(England) Burnley	End of season	
31 August 2022	DF	(England) Will Tizzard	(England) Chippenham Town	January 2023	
1 September 2022	DF	(Poland) Jan Bednarek	(England) Aston Villa	23 January 2023 (Note: Initially loaned out until the end of the season, Southampton recalled Bednarek from loan on 23 January 2023.)	
1 September 2022	GK	(Poland) Mateusz Lis	(France) Troyes	End of season	
1 September 2022	DF	(England) Dynel Simeu	(England) Tranmere Rovers	5 January 2023	
1 September 2022	DF	(England) Jack Stephens	(England) Bournemouth	End of season	
1 September 2022	DF	(England) Jake Vokins	(England) Woking	12 January 2023	
5 January 2023	DF	(England) Dynel Simeu	(England) Morecambe	End of season	
9 January 2023	FW	(England) Dan Nlundulu	(England) Bolton Wanderers	End of season	
12 January 2023	DF	(England) Nico Lawrence	(England) Torquay United	End of Season	
12 January 2023	DF	(England) Will Tizzard	(England) Chippenham Town	End of season	
18 January 2023	MF	(England) Ryan Finnigan	(England) Crewe Alexandra	End of season	
30 January 2023	FW	(Republic of Ireland) Luke Pearce	(England) Eastbourne Borough	End of season	
31 January 2023	FW	(Belgium) Kazeem Olaigbe	(England) Harrogate Town	End of season	
31 January 2023	DF	(England) Lewis Payne	(England) Eastleigh	3 March 2023 (Note: On 3 March, it was announced that Payne had returned to Southampton)	
31 January 2023	DF	(England) Thierry Small	(Scotland) St Mirren	End of season	
31 January 2023	MF	(England) Jack Turner	(England) Braintree Town	End of season	

Players released

Date	Pos.	Player	Subsequent club	Join date	Ref.
30 June 2022	GK	(England) Fraser Forster	(England) Tottenham Hotspur	1 July 2022	
30 June 2022	GK	(England) Harry Lewis	(England) Bradford City	1 July 2022	
30 June 2022	MF	(England) Ramello Mitchell	(England) West Bromwich Albion	1 July 2022	
30 June 2022	FW	(England) Jayden Smith	(England) Aldershot Town	1 July 2022	
30 June 2022	FW	(Republic of Ireland) Shane Long	(England) Reading	13 July 2022	
30 June 2022	FW	(England) Benni Smales-Braithwaite	(England) Barrow	2 August 2022	
30 June 2022	DF	(England) Oludare Olufunwa	(England) Liverpool	8 August 2022	
30 June 2022	MF	(England) Ethan Burnett	(England) Reading	19 August 2022	
9 January 2023	DF	(Ecuador) Jeremi Rodriguez	(United States) Los Angeles FC 2	24 March 2023	

== Pre-season and friendlies ==
Southampton revealed that a summer training camp would take place in Austria between 13 and 20 July, with a friendly match against Bundesliga side Austria Klagenfurt taking place on 18 July. On 9 June, a home pre-season friendly against Villarreal was confirmed. On 24 June, a further fixture against Watford was added to the team's pre-season schedule. A fourth friendly was announced on 7 July against Monaco at St Mary's Stadium, while a fifth against RB Leipzig was added to the side's Austrian pre-season tour on 8 July.

Win Draw Loss Fixtures

16 July 2022 Friendly	RB Leipzig	3–1	Southampton	Wolfsberg, Austria
13:00 BST	Angeliño 54'; Forsberg 67'; Moriba 90'	Report	A. Armstrong 64'	Stadium: Lavanttal-Arena; Attendance: 917

18 July 2022 Friendly	Austria Klagenfurt	0–0	Southampton	Klagenfurt, Austria
18:00 BST		Report		Stadium: Wörthersee Stadion; Attendance: 3,150

23 July 2022 Friendly	Watford	0–0	Southampton	Ruislip
15:00 BST		Report		Stadium: Grosvenor Vale; Referee: Sunny Gill

27 July 2022 Friendly	Southampton	3–1	Monaco	Southampton
19:45 BST	A. Armstrong 52'; S. Armstrong 73'; Ward-Prowse 87'	Report	Golovin 39'	Stadium: St Mary's Stadium; Attendance: 8,317; Referee: Tony Harrington

30 July 2022 Friendly	Southampton	1–2	Villarreal	Southampton
15:00 BST	Aribo 64'	Report	Pino 15'; Gerard 72'	Stadium: St Mary's Stadium; Attendance: 11,734; Referee: Anthony Taylor

== Competitions ==
=== Overall record ===
Competition	First match	Last match	Starting round	Final position	Record							
Competition	First match	Last match	Starting round	Final position	Pld	W	D	L	GF	GA	GD	Win %
Premier League	6 August 2022	28 May 2023	Matchday 1	20th	38	6	7	25	36	73	−37	15.79
FA Cup	7 January 2023	1 March 2023	Third round	Fifth round	3	2	0	1	5	4	+1	66.67
EFL Cup	23 August 2022	31 January 2023	Second round	Semi-finals	6	3	1	2	9	5	+4	50.00
Total					47	11	8	28	50	82	−32	23.40

Source: Soccerway

=== Premier League ===
==== League table ====
Pos	Team	Pld	W	D	L	GF	GA	GD	Pts	Qualification or relegation
16	Nottingham Forest	38	9	11	18	38	68	−30	38	
17	Everton	38	8	12	18	34	57	−23	36	
18	Leicester City (R)	38	9	7	22	51	68	−17	34	Relegation to EFL Championship
19	Leeds United (R)	38	7	10	21	48	78	−30	31	Relegation to EFL Championship
20	Southampton (R)	38	6	7	25	36	73	−37	25	Relegation to EFL Championship

Source: Premier League
Rules for classification: 1) Points; 2) Goal difference; 3) Goals scored; 4) If the champions, relegated teams or qualified teams for UEFA competitions cannot be determined by rules 1 to 3, rules 4.1 to 4.3 are applied – 4.1) Points gained in head-to-head record between such teams; 4.2) Away goals scored in head-to-head record between such teams; 4.3) Play-offs
(R) Relegated

==== Results summary ====
Overall								Home						Away					
Pld	W	D	L	GF	GA	GD	Pts	W	D	L	GF	GA	GD	W	D	L	GF	GA	GD
38	6	7	25	36	73	−37	25	2	5	12	19	37	−18	4	2	13	17	36	−19

Source: Premier League

==== Results by round ====
Round	1	2	3	4	5	6	7	8	9	10	11	12	13	14	15	16	17	18	19	20	21	22	23	24	25	26	27	28	29	30	31	32	33	34	35	36	37	38
Ground	A	H	A	H	H	A	A	H	A	H	A	H	A	H	A	H	A	H	A	H	A	H	A	A	H	A	H	H	A	H	H	A	H	A	A	H	A	H
Result	L	D	W	L	W	L	L	L	L	D	W	D	L	L	L	L	L	L	W	L	L	L	W	L	W	D	L	D	L	L	L	D	L	L	L	L	L	D
Position	20	17	11	13	9	12	14	16	17	18	14	16	17	18	19	20	20	20	20	20	20	20	20	20	19	20	20	20	20	20	20	20	20	20	20	20	20	20

Source: Premier League
A = Away; H = Home; W = Win; D = Draw; L = Loss; P = Postponed

==== Matches ====
Win Draw Loss Fixtures

On 16 June, the Premier League fixtures were released.

6 August 2022 1	Tottenham Hotspur	4–1	Southampton	Tottenham
15:00 BST	Sessegnon 23'; Dier 31'; Salisu 61' (o.g.); Kulusevski 63'	Report	Ward-Prowse 12'	Stadium: Tottenham Hotspur Stadium; Attendance: 61,732; Referee: Andre Marriner

13 August 2022 2	Southampton	2–2	Leeds United	Southampton
15:00 BST	Aribo 72'; Walker-Peters 81'	Report	Rodrigo 46', 60'	Stadium: St Mary's Stadium; Attendance: 30,815; Referee: Tony Harrington

20 August 2022 3	Leicester City	1–2	Southampton	Leicester
15:00 BST	Maddison 54'	Report	Adams 68', 84'	Stadium: King Power Stadium; Attendance: 30,850; Referee: Michael Salisbury

27 August 2022 4	Southampton	0–1	Manchester United	Southampton
12:30 BST		Report	Fernandes 55'	Stadium: St Mary's Stadium; Attendance: 31,196; Referee: Andy Madley
Note: Live on BT Sport.

30 August 2022 5	Southampton	2–1	Chelsea	Southampton
19:45 BST	Lavia 28'; A. Armstrong 45+1'	Report	Sterling 23'	Stadium: St Mary's Stadium; Attendance: 31,072; Referee: Michael Oliver
Note: Live on BT Sport.

3 September 2022 6	Wolverhampton Wanderers	1–0	Southampton	Wolverhampton
15:00 BST	Podence 45+1'	Report		Stadium: Molineux Stadium; Attendance: 30,546; Referee: John Brooks

16 September 2022 7	Aston Villa	1–0	Southampton	Birmingham
20:00 BST	Ramsey 41'	Report		Stadium: Villa Park; Attendance: 40,758; Referee: Tony Harrington
Note: Live on Sky Sports.

1 October 2022 8	Southampton	1–2	Everton	Southampton
15:00 BST	Aribo 49'	Report	Coady 52'; McNeil 54'	Stadium: St Mary's Stadium; Attendance: 30,510; Referee: Andre Marriner

8 October 2022 9	Manchester City	4–0	Southampton	Manchester
15:00 BST	Cancelo 20'; Foden 32'; Mahrez 49'; Haaland 65'	Report		Stadium: City of Manchester Stadium; Attendance: 53,365; Referee: Andy Madley

16 October 2022 10	Southampton	1–1	West Ham United	Southampton
14:00 BST	Perraud 20'	Report	Rice 64'	Stadium: St Mary's Stadium; Attendance: 29,159; Referee: Peter Bankes

19 October 2022 11	Bournemouth	0–1	Southampton	Bournemouth
19:30 BST		Report	Adams 9'	Stadium: Dean Court; Attendance: 10,405; Referee: John Brooks
Note: Live on Amazon Prime.

23 October 2022 12	Southampton	1–1	Arsenal	Southampton
14:00 BST	S. Armstrong 65'	Report	Xhaka 11'	Stadium: St Mary's Stadium; Attendance: 31,145; Referee: Robert Jones
Note: Live on Sky Sports.

29 October 2022 13	Crystal Palace	1–0	Southampton	Selhurst
15:00 BST	Édouard 38'	Report		Stadium: Selhurst Park; Attendance: 25,130; Referee: Michael Salisbury

6 November 2022 14	Southampton	1–4	Newcastle United	Southampton
14:00 GMT	Perraud 89'	Report	Almirón 35'; Wood 58'; Willock 62'; Bruno Guimarães 90+1'	Stadium: St Mary's Stadium; Attendance: 30,402; Referee: Stuart Attwell
Note: Live on Sky Sports.

12 November 2022 15	Liverpool	3–1	Southampton	Liverpool
15:00 GMT	Firmino 6'; Núñez 21', 42'	Report	Adams 9'	Stadium: Anfield; Attendance: 53,331; Referee: Simon Hooper

26 December 2022 16	Southampton	1–3	Brighton & Hove Albion	Southampton
15:00 GMT	Ward-Prowse 73'	Report	Lallana 14'; Perraud 35' (o.g.); March 56'	Stadium: St Mary's Stadium; Attendance: 31,010; Referee: Robert Jones
Note: Live on Amazon Prime.

31 December 2022 17	Fulham	2–1	Southampton	Fulham
15:00 GMT	Ward-Prowse 32' (o.g.); Palhinha 88'	Report	Ward-Prowse 56'	Stadium: Craven Cottage; Attendance: 24,344; Referee: Graham Scott

4 January 2023 18	Southampton	0–1	Nottingham Forest	Southampton
19:30 GMT		Report	Awoniyi 27'	Stadium: St. Mary's Stadium; Attendance: 30,150; Referee: Thomas Bramall

14 January 2023 19	Everton	1–2	Southampton	Liverpool
15:00 GMT	Onana 39'	Report	Ward-Prowse 46', 78'	Stadium: Goodison Park; Attendance: 39,305; Referee: John Brooks

21 January 2023 20	Southampton	0–1	Aston Villa	Southampton
15:00 GMT		Report	Watkins 77'	Stadium: St Mary's Stadium; Attendance: 30,158; Referee: Michael Salisbury

4 February 2023 21	Brentford	3–0	Southampton	Brentford
15:00 GMT	Mee 41'; Mbeumo 44'; Jensen 80'	Report		Stadium: Brentford Community Stadium; Attendance: 17,051; Referee: Darren Bond

11 February 2023 22	Southampton	1–2	Wolverhampton Wanderers	Southampton
15:00 GMT	Alcaraz 24'	Report	Bednarek 72' (o.g.); João Gomes 87'	Stadium: St Mary's Stadium; Attendance: 29,751; Referee: Jarred Gillett

18 February 2023 23	Chelsea	0–1	Southampton	Fulham
15:00 GMT		Report	Ward-Prowse 45+1'	Stadium: Stamford Bridge; Attendance: 40,152; Referee: David Coote

25 February 2023 24	Leeds United	1–0	Southampton	Leeds
15:00 GMT	Firpo 77'	Report		Stadium: Elland Road; Attendance: 36,641; Referee: Peter Bankes

4 March 2023 25	Southampton	1–0	Leicester City	Southampton
17:30 GMT	Alcaraz 35'	Report		Stadium: St Mary's Stadium; Attendance: 30,139; Referee: Robert Jones
Note: Live on Sky Sports.

12 March 2023 26	Manchester United	0–0	Southampton	Trafford
14:00 GMT		Report		Stadium: Old Trafford; Attendance: 73,439; Referee: Anthony Taylor

15 March 2023 27	Southampton	0–2	Brentford	Southampton
19:30 GMT		Report	Toney 32'; Wissa 90+7'	Stadium: St Mary's Stadium; Attendance: 30,438; Referee: Michael Salisbury

18 March 2023 28	Southampton	3–3	Tottenham Hotspur	Southampton
15:00 GMT	Adams 46'; Walcott 77'; Ward-Prowse 90+3' (pen.)	Report	Porro 45+1'; Kane 65'; Perišić 74'	Stadium: St Mary's Stadium; Attendance: 30,157; Referee: Simon Hooper

2 April 2023 29	West Ham United	1–0	Southampton	Stratford
14:00 BST	Aguerd 25'	Report		Stadium: London Stadium; Attendance: 62,465; Referee: Paul Tierney
Note: Live on Sky Sports.

8 April 2023 30	Southampton	1–4	Manchester City	Southampton
17:30 BST	Mara 72'	Report	Haaland 45', 68'; Grealish 58'; Álvarez 75' (pen.)	Stadium: St Mary's Stadium; Attendance: 30,963; Referee: Robert Jones
Note: Live on Sky Sports.

15 April 2023 31	Southampton	0–2	Crystal Palace	Southampton
15:00 BST		Report	Eze 54', 68'	Stadium: St Mary's Stadium; Attendance: 30,309; Referee: Michael Oliver

21 April 2023 32	Arsenal	3–3	Southampton	Holloway
20:00 BST	Martinelli 20'; Ødegaard 88'; Saka 90+1'	Report	Alcaraz 1'; Walcott 14'; Ćaleta-Car 66'	Stadium: Emirates Stadium; Attendance: 60,175; Referee: Simon Hooper
Note: Live on Sky Sports.

27 April 2023 33	Southampton	0–1	Bournemouth	Southampton
19:45 BST		Report	Tavernier 50'	Stadium: St Mary's Stadium; Attendance: 30,414; Referee: Darren England
Note: Live on BT Sport.

30 April 2023 34	Newcastle United	3–1	Southampton	Newcastle upon Tyne
14:00 BST	Wilson 54', 81'; Walcott 79' (o.g.)	Report	S. Armstrong 41'	Stadium: St James' Park; Attendance: 52,234; Referee: Anthony Taylor

8 May 2023 35	Nottingham Forest	4–3	Southampton	West Bridgford
20:00 BST	Awoniyi 18', 21'; Gibbs-White 44' (pen.); Danilo 73'	Report	Alcaraz 25'; Lyanco 51'; Ward-Prowse 90+6' (pen.)	Stadium: The City Ground; Attendance: 29,154; Referee: Michael Oliver
Note: Live on Sky Sports.

13 May 2023 36	Southampton	0–2	Fulham	Southampton
15:00 BST		Report	Carlos Vinícius 48'; Mitrović 72'	Stadium: St Mary's Stadium; Attendance: 28,978; Referee: Thomas Bramall

21 May 2023 37	Brighton & Hove Albion	3–1	Southampton	Brighton and Hove
14:00 BST	Ferguson 29', 40'; Groß 69'	Report	Elyounoussi 58'	Stadium: American Express Community Stadium; Attendance: 31,507; Referee: Paul Tierney

28 May 2023 38	Southampton	4–4	Liverpool	Southampton
16:30 BST	Ward-Prowse 19'; Sulemana 28', 47'; A. Armstrong 64'	Report	Jota 10', 73'; Firmino 14'; Gakpo 72'	Stadium: St Mary's Stadium; Attendance: 31,129; Referee: Darren England

=== FA Cup ===
The Saints were drawn away to Crystal Palace in the third round and at home to Blackpool in the fourth round. The Saints were drawn at home again in the fifth round, against the winners of the tie between Luton Town and Grimsby Town.

Win Draw Loss Fixtures

7 January 2023 Third round	Crystal Palace	1–2	Southampton	Selhurst
12:30 GMT	Édouard 14'	Report	Ward-Prowse 37'; A. Armstorng 68'	Stadium: Selhurst Park; Attendance: 20,320; Referee: Darren Bond

28 January 2023 Fourth round	Southampton	2–1	Blackpool	Southampton
15:00 GMT	Perraud 22', 62'	Report	Patino 67'	Stadium: St Mary's Stadium; Attendance: 20,665; Referee: Craig Pawson

1 March 2023 Fifth round	Southampton	1–2	Grimsby Town	Southampton
19:15 GMT	Ćaleta-Car 65'	Report	Holohan 45+1' (pen.), 50' (pen.)	Stadium: St Mary's Stadium; Attendance: 17,584; Referee: Thomas Bramall
Note: Live on ITV4 and ITVX

=== EFL Cup ===
Southampton entered in the second round of the competition and were drawn away to Cambridge United. In the third round they were drawn at home to Sheffield Wednesday. A fourth round tie against EFL League One side Lincoln City was drawn next for the Saints. In the quarter-finals, Southampton were drawn as host to Manchester City. Over two legs in the semi-finals, Southampton were drawn against Newcastle United.

Win Draw Loss Fixtures

23 August 2022 Second round	Cambridge United	0–3	Southampton	Cambridge
19:45 BST		Report	Adams 16', 55'; Ballard 88'	Stadium: The Abbey Stadium; Attendance: 6,733; Referee: David Rock

9 November 2022 Third round	Southampton	1–1 (6–5 p)	Sheffield Wednesday	Southampton
19:45 GMT	Ward-Prowse 45+2' (pen.)	Report	Windass 24'	Stadium: St Mary's Stadium; Attendance: 20,457; Referee: John Brooks
	Penalties
	Ward-Prowse (penalty scored); Elyounoussi (penalty scored); Diallo (penalty scored); Maitland-Niles (penalty scored); A. Armstrong (penalty scored); Walcott (penalty scored)		(penalty scored) Smith; (penalty scored) Bannan; (penalty scored) Johnson; (penalty scored) Vaulks; (penalty scored) Gregory; (penalty missed) Iorfa

20 December 2022 Fourth round	Southampton	2–1	Lincoln City	Southampton
19:45 GMT	Adams 25', 74'	Report	Bazunu 2' (o.g.)	Stadium: St Mary's Stadium; Attendance: 17,385; Referee: Jarred Gillett

11 January 2023 Quarter-finals	Southampton	2–0	Manchester City	Southampton
20:00 GMT	Mara 23'; Djenepo 28'	Report		Stadium: St Mary's Stadium; Attendance: 22,996; Referee: Peter Bankes
Note: Live on Sky Sports.

24 January 2023 Semi-finals first leg	Southampton	0–1	Newcastle United	Southampton
20:00 GMT		Report	Joelinton 73'	Stadium: St Mary's Stadium; Attendance: 30,090; Referee: Stuart Attwell
Note: Live on Sky Sports.

31 January 2023 Semi-finals second leg	Newcastle United	2–1 (3–1 agg.)	Southampton	Newcastle upon Tyne
20:00 GMT	Longstaff 5', 21'	Report	Adams 29'	Stadium: St James' Park; Attendance: 51,975; Referee: Paul Tierney
Note: Live on Sky Sports.

== Squad statistics ==
As of 28 May 2023

No.	Pos.	Nat.	Name	League				FA Cup				EFL Cup				Total			
No.	Pos.	Nat.	Name	Apps.	Goals	Yellow card	Red card	Apps.	Goals	Yellow card	Red card	Apps.	Goals	Yellow card	Red card	Apps.	Goals	Yellow card	Red card
1	GK	(England)	Alex McCarthy	6	0	0	0	1	0	0	0	2	0	0	0	9	0	0	0
2	DF	(England)	Kyle Walker-Peters	30(1)	1	4	0	1(2)	0	1	0	4	0	1	0	35(3)	1	6	0
3	MF	(England)	Ainsley Maitland-Niles	13(9)	0	3	0	2	0	0	0	1(1)	0	0	0	16(10)	0	3	0
4	DF	(Brazil)	Lyanco	11(10)	1	4	0	3	0	0	0	6	0	2	0	20(10)	1	6	0
6	DF	(Croatia)	Duje Ćaleta-Car	9(4)	1	2	0	2	1	2	0	3(1)	0	0	1	14(5)	2	4	1
7	MF	(Nigeria)	Joe Aribo	13(8)	2	2	0	2	0	0	0	1(3)	0	0	0	16(11)	2	2	0
8	MF	(England)	James Ward-Prowse	38	9	6	0	1(1)	1	1	0	5	1	0	0	44(1)	11	7	0
9	FW	(England)	Adam Armstrong	14(16)	2	2	0	2(1)	1	0	0	5(1)	0	0	0	21(18)	3	2	0
10	FW	(Scotland)	Ché Adams	23(5)	5	1	0	1(1)	0	0	0	3(2)	5	0	0	27(8)	10	1	0
11	MF	(Croatia)	Mislav Oršić	0(1)	0	0	0	2	0	0	0	1(1)	0	0	0	3(2)	0	0	0
12	FW	(Nigeria)	Paul Onuachu	4(7)	0	0	0	0	0	0	0	0	0	0	0	4(7)	0	0	0
13	GK	(Argentina)	Willy Caballero	0	0	0	0	1	0	0	0	0	0	0	0	1	0	0	0
14	DF	(England)	James Bree	4(1)	0	1	0	0	0	0	0	1	0	0	0	5(1)	0	1	0
15	DF	(France)	Romain Perraud	22(7)	2	4	0	3	2	1	0	1(3)	0	1	0	26(9)	4	6	0
17	MF	(Scotland)	Stuart Armstrong	14(18)	2	6	0	0	0	0	0	1(2)	0	0	0	15(20)	2	6	0
18	FW	(France)	Sékou Mara	3(19)	1	1	0	2(1)	0	1	0	3(2)	1	0	0	8(22)	2	2	0
19	MF	(Mali)	Moussa Djenepo	7(9)	0	1	0	1(1)	0	0	0	3(2)	1	1	0	11(12)	1	2	0
20	MF	(Ghana)	Kamaldeen Sulemana	10(8)	2	1	0	0	0	0	0	0	0	0	0	10(8)	2	1	0
21	DF	(England)	Tino Livramento	0(2)	0	0	0	0	0	0	0	0	0	0	0	0(2)	0	0	0
22	DF	(Ghana)	Mohammed Salisu	21(1)	0	5	0	1	0	0	0	5	0	1	0	27(1)	0	6	0
23	MF	(England)	Samuel Edozie	5(12)	0	0	0	2(1)	0	0	0	1(3)	0	0	0	8(16)	0	0	0
24	MF	(Norway)	Mohamed Elyounoussi	27(6)	1	4	0	1	0	0	0	2(2)	0	0	0	30(8)	1	4	0
26	MF	(Argentina)	Carlos Alcaraz	13(5)	4	3	0	1	0	0	0	2	0	1	0	16(5)	4	4	0
27	MF	(France)	Ibrahima Diallo	11(7)	0	4	0	0(2)	0	1	0	5	0	1	0	16(9)	0	6	0
28	DF	(Spain)	Juan Larios	2(3)	0	0	0	0	0	0	0	0	0	0	0	2(3)	0	0	0
31	GK	(Republic of Ireland)	Gavin Bazunu	32	0	0	0	1	0	0	0	4	0	0	0	37	0	0	0
32	MF	(England)	Theo Walcott	13(7)	2	1	0	0(2)	0	0	0	0(2)	0	0	0	13(11)	2	1	0
35	DF	(Poland)	Jan Bednarek	20	0	5	0	0	0	0	0	2(1)	0	0	0	22(1)	0	5	0
37	DF	(Germany)	Armel Bella-Kotchap	24	0	4	0	1	0	0	0	1	0	0	0	26	0	4	0
45	MF	(Belgium)	Roméo Lavia	26(3)	1	9	0	2	0	0	0	1(2)	0	1	0	29(5)	1	10	0
53	FW	(England)	Dom Ballard	0(2)	0	0	0	0(1)	0	0	0	0(1)	1	0	0	0(4)	1	0	0
61	DF	(England)	Lewis Payne	0	0	0	0	0	0	0	0	1	0	0	0	1	0	0	0
65	MF	(England)	Kamari Doyle	0(1)	0	0	0	0	0	0	0	0	0	0	0	0(1)	0	0	0
66	MF	(England)	Diamond Edwards	0	0	0	0	0	0	0	0	0(1)	0	0	0	0(1)	0	0	0
75	MF	(England)	Sam Amo-Ameyaw	0(1)	0	0	0	0	0	0	0	0	0	0	0	0(1)	0	0	0
Players with appearances who ended the season on loan
5	DF	(England)	Jack Stephens	0(2)	0	0	0	0	0	0	0	0	0	0	0	0(2)	0	0	0
Players with appearances who left during the season
6	MF	(Spain)	Oriol Romeu	1	0	0	0	0	0	0	0	1	0	1	0	2	0	1	0
11	MF	(England)	Nathan Redmond	0(1)	0	0	0	0	0	0	0	0	0	0	0	0(1)	0	0	0
43	DF	(Tunisia)	Yan Valery	1	0	0	0	0	0	0	0	1	0	0	0	2	0	0	0

=== Most appearances ===
As of 28 May 2023

#	Pos.	Nat.	Name	League		FA Cup		EFL Cup		Total		
#	Pos.	Nat.	Name	Starts	Subs	Starts	Subs	Starts	Subs	Starts	Subs	Total
1	MF	(England)	James Ward-Prowse	38	0	1	1	5	0	44	1	45
2	FW	(England)	Adam Armstrong	14	16	2	1	5	1	21	18	39
3	GK	(Republic of Ireland)	Gavin Bazunu	32	0	1	0	4	0	37	0	37
3	DF	(England)	Kyle Walker-Peters	30	1	2	1	4	0	36	2	38
3	MF	(Norway)	Mohamed Elyounoussi	27	6	1	0	2	2	30	8	38
6	DF	(France)	Romain Perraud	22	7	3	0	1	3	26	10	36
7	FW	(Scotland)	Ché Adams	23	5	1	1	3	2	27	8	35
7	MF	(Scotland)	Stuart Armstrong	14	18	0	0	1	2	15	20	35
9	MF	(Belgium)	Roméo Lavia	26	3	2	0	1	2	29	5	34
10	DF	(Brazil)	Lyanco	11	10	3	0	6	0	20	10	30
10	FW	(France)	Sékou Mara	3	19	2	1	3	2	8	22	30

=== Top goalscorers ===
As of 28 May 2023

#	Pos.	Nat.	Name	League		FA Cup		EFL Cup		Total		
#	Pos.	Nat.	Name	Goals	Apps.	Goals	Apps.	Goals	Apps.	Goals	Apps.	GPG
1	MF	(England)	James Ward-Prowse	9	38	1	2	1	5	11	45	0.24
2	FW	(Scotland)	Ché Adams	5	28	0	2	5	5	10	35	0.29
3	MF	(Argentina)	Carlos Alcaraz	4	18	0	1	0	2	4	21	0.19
3	DF	(France)	Romain Perraud	2	28	2	3	0	4	4	36	0.11
5	FW	(England)	Adam Armstrong	2	30	1	3	0	6	3	39	0.08
6	MF	(Ghana)	Kamaldeen Sulemana	2	18	0	0	0	0	2	18	0.11
6	DF	(Croatia)	Duje Ćaleta-Car	1	13	1	2	0	4	2	19	0.11
6	MF	(England)	Theo Walcott	2	20	0	2	0	2	2	24	0.08
6	MF	(Nigeria)	Joe Aribo	2	21	0	3	0	3	2	27	0.07
6	FW	(France)	Sékou Mara	1	22	0	3	1	5	2	30	0.07
6	MF	(Scotland)	Stuart Armstrong	2	32	0	0	0	3	2	35	0.06
