= Romain Perraud =

French footballer (born 1997)

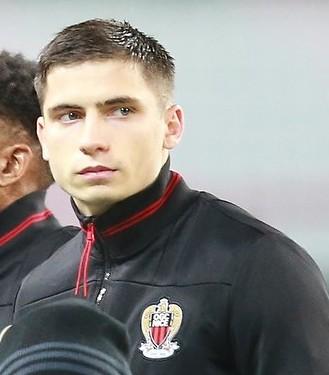
- Perraud with Nice in 2018

Personal information
- Full name: Romain Paul Jean-Michel Perraud
- Date of birth: 22 September 1997 (age 29)
- Place of birth: Toulouse, France
- Height: 1.73 m (5 ft 8 in)
- Position: Left-back

Team information
- Current team: Lille
- Number: 15

Youth career
- 2007–2008: Blagnac
- 2008–2009: Toulouse Fontaines
- 2009–2014: US Colomiers
- 2014–2016: Nice

Senior career*
Years	Team	Apps	(Gls)
2015–2018	Nice II	65	(9)
2018–2019	Nice	1	(0)
2018–2019	→ Paris FC (loan)	33	(5)
2019–2021	Brest	56	(3)
2021–2024	Southampton	49	(2)
2023–2024	→ Nice (loan)	19	(0)
2024–2025	Betis	28	(2)
2025–	Lille	39	(3)

International career
2014	France U17	4	(1)
2014	France U18	1	(0)
2015–2017	France U19	9	(1)
2016–2018	France U20	8	(0)
- * Club domestic league appearances and goals as of 23:03, 30 October 2026 (UTC)

Romain Paul Jean-Michel Perraud (born 22 September 1997) is a French professional footballer who plays as a left-back for Ligue 1 club Lille.

== Club career ==
=== Early career ===
Born in Toulouse in 1997, Perraud began his youth career with local side, Blagnac in 2007. He left in 2008 to join his hometown club Toulouse Fontaines Club, before moving on to US Colomiers in 2009.

=== Nice ===
In 2014, Perraud joined Nice's youth team from US Colomiers Football. Two years later, he joined the club's senior ranks. On 8 December 2016, Perraud made his senior debut for Nice in the 6th matchday of the 2016–17 UEFA Europa League against Krasnodar at Allianz Riviera, playing the full match.

==== Paris FC (loan) ====
In August 2018, Perraud signed a season-long loan with Paris FC. On 14 September 2018, he made his first appearance for the club in a 0–0 draw with Ajaccio. On 22 September 2018, Perraud scored his first goal for Paris FC after a 2–1 win against Metz.

=== Brest ===
In August 2019, Perraud signed a four-year deal with Brest. On 10 August, he made his first appearance for the club in a 1–1 draw against Toulouse. On 13 September 2020, Perraud scored his first goal for Brest in a 2–0 victory over Dijon.

=== Southampton ===
On 2 July 2021, Perraud signed a four-year contract with Southampton for an undisclosed fee. On 14 August, he made his Premier League debut for Southampton in a 3–1 defeat to Everton. On 2 March 2022, Perraud scored his first professional goal for Southampton with a 30-yard strike in a 3–1 FA Cup victory against West Ham United.

During the 2022–23 season, Perraud scored his first Premier League goal in a 1–1 draw against West Ham. On 6 November 2022, he scored in a 1–4 defeat against Newcastle. Perraud scored a brace on 28 January 2023 in a 2–1 FA Cup victory against Blackpool. After sustaining an ankle injury during a 0–1 defeat to Bournemouth on 27 April, Perraud was ruled out for the remainder of the season.

==== Nice (loan) ====
On 28 August 2023, Perraud returned to Nice on a season-long loan from Southampton, with an option to buy.

=== Betis ===
On 24 June 2024, Perraud signed for Spanish La Liga side Real Betis effective from 1 July.

=== Lille ===
On 8 August 2025, Perraud returned to France, signing a three-year contract with Lille.

== Career statistics ==
As of match played 30 October 2026

Appearances and goals by club, season and competition
Club	Season	League			National cup		League cup		Europe		Other		Total	
Club	Season	Division	Apps	Goals	Apps	Goals	Apps	Goals	Apps	Goals	Apps	Goals	Apps	Goals
Nice	2016–17	Ligue 1	0	0	0	0	0	0	1 (Note: Appearances in UEFA Europa League)	0	—		1	0
Nice	2017–18	Ligue 1	1	0	0	0	0	0	2	0	—		3	0
Nice	Total		1	0	0	0	0	0	3	0	0	0	4	0
Paris FC (loan)	2018–19	Ligue 2	33	5	1	0	0	0	—		—		34	5
Brest	2019–20	Ligue 1	20	0	1	0	3	0	—		—		24	0
Brest	2020–21	Ligue 1	36	3	1	0	—		—		—		37	3
Brest	Total		56	3	2	0	3	0	—		—		61	3
Southampton	2021–22	Premier League	20	0	2	1	1	0	—		—		23	1
Southampton	2022–23	Premier League	29	2	3	2	4	0	—		—		36	4
Southampton	2023–24	Championship	0	0	0	0	1	0	—		—		1	0
Southampton	Total		49	2	5	3	6	0	—		—		60	5
Nice (loan)	2023–24	Ligue 1	19	0	2	0	—		—		—		21	0
Real Betis	2024–25	La Liga	28	2	3	0	—		9 (Note: Appearances in UEFA Conference League)	0	—		41	2
Lille	2025–26	Ligue 1	30	3	1	0	—		10	0	—		41	3
Lille	2026–27	Ligue 1	9	0	0	0	—		2 (Note: Appearances in UEFA Champions League)	0	—		11	0
Lille	Total		39	3	1	0	—		12	0	—		52	3
Career total			225	14	14	3	9	0	25	0	0	0	273	17

== Honours ==
Betis

- UEFA Conference League runner-up: 2024–25

Individual

- Toulon Tournament Best XI: 2018
