= Stuart Armstrong =

Scottish footballer (born 1992)

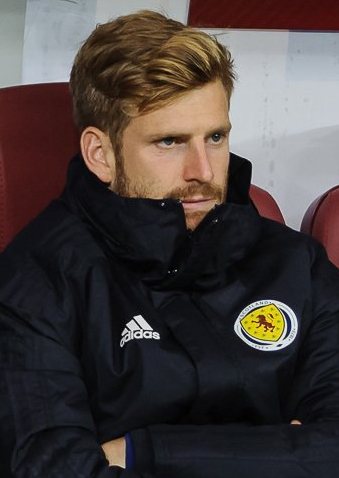
- Armstrong with Scotland in 2019

Personal information
- Full name: Stuart Armstrong
- Date of birth: 30 March 1992 (age 34)
- Place of birth: Inverness, Scotland
- Height: 6 ft 0 in (1.83 m)
- Position: Midfielder

Team information
- Current team: Aberdeen
- Number: 17

Youth career
- 2003–2008: Dyce Boys Club
- 2008–2009: Inverness Caledonian Thistle
- 2009–2010: Dundee United

Senior career*
Years	Team	Apps	(Gls)
2010–2015	Dundee United	126	(18)
2015–2018	Celtic	98	(23)
2018–2024	Southampton	191	(21)
2024	Vancouver Whitecaps	6	(1)
2025	Sheffield Wednesday	11	(0)
2025–	Aberdeen	41	(2)

International career^{‡}
2010–2011	Scotland U19	7	(2)
2010–2014	Scotland U21	20	(4)
2017–	Scotland	53	(5)
- * Club domestic league appearances and goals as of 08:47, 22 November 2026 (UTC) ‡ National team caps and goals as of 25 November 2024

Stuart Armstrong (born 30 March 1992) is a Scottish professional footballer who plays as a midfielder for Scottish Premiership team Aberdeen. He also plays for the Scotland national team.

Armstrong began his professional career with Dundee United, making his debut in 2010 and went on to make almost 150 appearances. Armstrong moved to Celtic in February 2015, and helped them win four Scottish league championships and consecutive domestic trebles. He then moved to Premier League club Southampton in June 2018. Armstrong joined Canadian club Vancouver Whitecaps in September 2024 before he moved to Sheffield Wednesday in January 2025. He returned to Scotland with Aberdeen in September 2025.

Armstrong represented Scotland at under-19 and under-21 level, then made his full international debut in 2017, representing the side at UEFA Euro 2020. He was voted as the SFWA Young Player of the Year in 2013 and has been named in the PFA Scotland Team of the Year for the Scottish Premiership three times. He was also nominated twice for the PFA Scotland Young Player of the Year.

== Early life ==
Born in Inverness, Armstrong attended Hazlehead Academy in Aberdeen, alongside fellow footballer Fraser Fyvie. Armstrong grew up idolizing Gianfranco Zola.

== Club career ==
=== Early career ===
Armstrong played for Dyce Boys Club and the Inverness Caledonian Thistle youth team, before signing professionally with Dundee United in July 2009.

=== Dundee United ===
==== 2010–11 ====
Armstrong made his first team debut for Dundee United in November 2010, coming on as a substitute in a 1–0 win over Hamilton Academical. Towards the end of the season, manager Peter Houston praised Armstrong on his substitute role.

==== 2011–12 ====
Armstrong then scored his first goal for United in a 2–2 draw against St Mirren in December 2011. After the match, Armstrong said that "I got a deflected goal in Inverness last month but my first proper strike came against St Mirren in the 2–2 draw last week and that has filled me with confidence".

==== 2012–13 ====
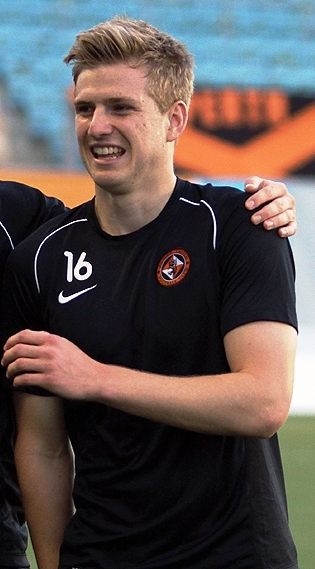
Armstrong training with Dundee United in 2012

After making six appearances this season, Armstrong agreed a three-year contract with Dundee United in September 2012. Armstrong then signed another new contract with United in October 2012. Armstrong scored his first goal of the season on 24 November, in a 2–1 win over Ross County. Having made six appearances in February, Armstrong was awarded Clydesdale Bank Premier League Young Player of the Month. Armstrong was nominated for SPFA young player of the year, but it was awarded to Hibernian's Leigh Griffiths instead. He did, however, go on to win the SFWA Young Player of the Year award.

==== 2013–14 ====
Armstrong and Dundee United began negotiations over a new contract, and on 12 December, he signed a one-year contract extension. Armstrong expressed an ambition to play in England in the future, but said he was happy to wait until he had established himself in the United first team. In the January 2014 transfer window, Celtic were interested in some of Dundee United's other youngsters. This was later dismissed as "speculation" by Celtic manager Neil Lennon. In April 2014, he was nominated for the 2013–14 PFA Scotland Young Player of the Year award. He was also selected to the 2013–14 Premiership PFA Scotland Team of the Year.

==== 2014–15 ====
His last match for Dundee United came in a New Firm derby defeat of Aberdeen in a 2014–15 Scottish League Cup semi-final on 31 January 2015. Armstrong made 150 appearances, starting 109 matches, and scored 22 goals in all competitions for Dundee United before joining Celtic.

=== Celtic ===
==== 2014–15 ====
In January 2015, Dundee United turned down two transfer offers from Celtic for Armstrong, however the transfer was completed on 2 February 2015, alongside fellow Dundee United player Gary Mackay-Steven. Armstrong denied requesting the transfer. Both players would be ineligible for the remaining Scottish Cup and Scottish League Cup ties as Celtic chased a domestic treble. Armstrong and Mackay-Steven were later given the nickname Zig and Zag by the staff at Celtic.

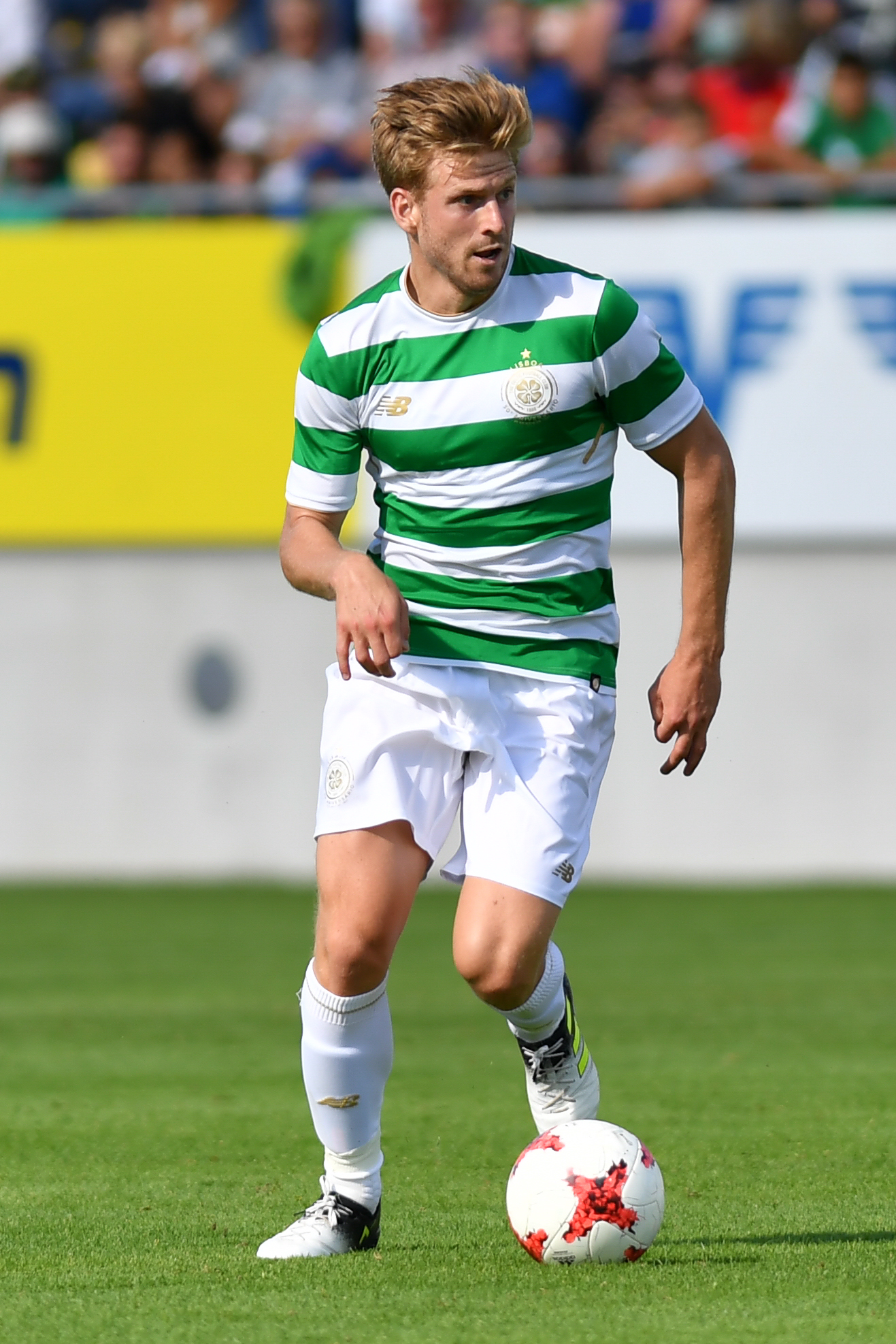
Armstrong playing for Celtic in 2017

Armstrong scored on his Celtic debut in a 3–0 league victory at Partick Thistle on 11 February 2015. He gave Celtic a 2–0 lead after fellow debutant Gary Mackay-Steven opened the scoring. Armstrong made his Celtic Park and European debut in a 3–3 draw with Inter Milan in the UEFA Europa League on 19 February 2015.

==== 2015–16 ====
Armstrong made his first appearance of the 2015–16 season in the UEFA Champions League second qualifying round first leg tie against Stjarnan, assisting the second goal in a 2–0 home win. He scored his first goals of the season with a second-half brace, in a 4–2 league win against Inverness Caledonian Thistle on 15 August.

==== 2016–17 ====
Armstrong scored 17 goals in all competitions as Celtic won a domestic treble.

==== 2017–18 ====
Celtic won a second successive domestic treble in 2017–18, but Armstrong's season was interrupted by injuries. In June 2018, Celtic agreed a £7 million transfer fee for Armstrong with Premier League club Southampton.

=== Southampton ===
==== 2018–19 ====
Armstrong signed a four-year contract with Southampton in June 2018. He said he wanted to "hit the ground running" at the club. On 12 August 2018, Armstrong made his debut in a 0–0 draw against Burnley in the Premier League. In November 2018, he stated that he did not miss Scottish football. On 24 November 2018, Armstrong scored his first two goals for Southampton in a 3–2 defeat against Fulham in the league.

==== 2019–20 ====
On 17 August 2019, Armstrong made his first league appearance of the season in a 1–2 defeat to Liverpool, replacing Ché Adams in the second half. On 2 November 2019, Armstrong made his first league start of the season in a 2–1 defeat to Manchester City. On 11 January 2020, Armstrong scored his first goal of the season in Southampton's 1–2 victory against Leicester City at the King Power Stadium.

On 13 March 2020, the Premier League was suspended due to the COVID-19 pandemic. This meant that Armstrong and Southampton would not play again until 19 June 2020, where Armstrong scored in a 0–3 victory against Norwich at Carrow Road.

==== 2020–21 ====
It was announced on 1 January 2021 that Armstrong had signed a new three-and-a-half-year contract with Southampton, which will run to the summer of 2024.

==== 2021–22 ====
On 5 February 2022, Armstrong scored in a 2–1 victory against Coventry City in the FA Cup which was voted as goal of the fourth round. His first league goal of the season came on 19 February 2022 in a 2–0 victory against Everton.

==== 2022–23 ====
On 23 October 2022, Armstrong scored his first goal of the season in a 1–1 draw with Arsenal. His only other goal of the 2022–23 season came on 30 April 2023 in a 3–1 defeat to Newcastle United.

==== 2023–24 ====
Armstrong made his first appearance of the season on 4 August 2023 in a 1–2 victory against Sheffield Wednesday. On 3 October 2023, he scored his first goal of the campaign in a 0–1 victory against Stoke City. During a 2–1 defeat to Cardiff City on 20 April 2024, he suffered an injury and was expected to be sidelined for the remainder of the season. Armstrong was released by Southampton at the end of the 2023–24 season.

=== Vancouver Whitecaps ===
On 3 September 2024, Armstrong joined MLS side Vancouver Whitecaps on a two-year contract. He made his Whitecaps debut in a 0–0 draw with FC Dallas on 7 September, and scored his first goal a week later in a 2–0 victory against San Jose Earthquakes.

=== Sheffield Wednesday ===
On 31 January 2025, Armstrong returned to England, joining Sheffield Wednesday. He made his debut the following day, coming off the bench against Luton Town. He was released from his contract following the end of the 2024–25 season.

=== Aberdeen ===
On 2 September 2025, Armstrong returned to Scotland, joining Scottish Premiership side Aberdeen on a 2 year deal.

== International career ==
Armstrong represented Scotland at under-19 and under-21 levels. On 21 May 2013, Armstrong was called up for the senior team, along with his Dundee United teammate Gary Mackay-Steven. He was called up again by the national team in August 2015, and again in March 2017. Armstrong made his full international debut on 26 March 2017, in a 1–0 win against Slovenia. National team manager Gordon Strachan called it "the best Scotland debut I have ever seen." In September 2017 he was ruled out of two 2018 World Cup qualifying games through injury.

In October 2020 he pulled out of the Scotland squad for a UEFA Euro 2020 qualifying play-off semi-final against Israel after testing positive for COVID-19.

In May 2021, he was selected in the Scotland squad for the delayed UEFA Euro 2020 tournament. He played in all three of the team's Group D matches, starting against both Czechia and Croatia at Hampden Park and appearing as a substitute against England at Wembley Stadium.

On 26 March 2024, Armstrong won his 50th cap for Scotland in a 1–0 friendly loss to Northern Ireland.

On 7 June 2024, Armstrong was named in Scotland's squad for the UEFA Euro 2024 finals in Germany. He made one appearance at the tournament, coming on as a 76th minute substitute for John McGinn against Hungary as Scotland finished bottom of Group A with one point from three matches.

== Personal life ==
In 2014, Armstrong was studying for a law degree through the Open University in his spare time.

== Career statistics ==
=== Club ===
As of 21 November 2026

Appearances and goals by club, season and competition
Club	Season	League			National Cup (Note: Includes Scottish Cup, FA Cup, Canadian Championship)		League Cup (Note: Includes Scottish League Cup, EFL Cup)		Other		Total	
Club	Season	Division	Apps	Goals	Apps	Goals	Apps	Goals	Apps	Goals	Apps	Goals
Dundee United	2010–11	Scottish Premier League	11	0	0	0	0	0	0	0	11	0
Dundee United	2011–12	Scottish Premier League	23	1	3	0	2	0	0	0	28	1
Dundee United	2012–13	Scottish Premier League	36	3	4	0	2	0	1 (Note: Appearance(s) in UEFA Europa League)	0	43	3
Dundee United	2013–14	Scottish Premiership	36	8	5	3	2	0	—		43	11
Dundee United	2014–15	Scottish Premiership	20	6	1	0	3	0	—		24	6
Dundee United	Total		126	18	13	3	9	0	1	0	149	21
Celtic	2014–15	Scottish Premiership	15	1	—		—		2	1	17	2
Celtic	2015–16	Scottish Premiership	25	4	1	0	2	0	11 (Note: Six appearances in UEFA Champions League, five appearances in UEFA Europa League)	0	39	4
Celtic	2016–17	Scottish Premiership	31	15	4	2	3	0	9 (Note: Appearances in UEFA Champions League)	0	47	17
Celtic	2017–18	Scottish Premiership	27	3	1	0	3	1	10	1	41	5
Celtic	Total		98	23	6	2	8	1	32	2	144	28
Southampton	2018–19	Premier League	29	3	1	1	2	0	—		32	4
Southampton	2019–20	Premier League	30	5	3	0	1	0	—		34	5
Southampton	2020–21	Premier League	33	4	5	1	0	0	—		38	5
Southampton	2021–22	Premier League	25	2	4	1	1	0	—		30	3
Southampton	2022–23	Premier League	32	2	0	0	3	0	—		35	2
Southampton	2023–24	Championship	42	5	2	1	1	0	0	0	45	6
Southampton	Total		191	21	15	4	8	0	0	0	214	25
Vancouver Whitecaps	2024	Major League Soccer	6	1	1	0	—		4 (Note: Appearances in MLS Cup playoffs)	1	11	2
Sheffield Wednesday	2024–25	Championship	11	0	0	0	0	0	—		11	0
Aberdeen	2025–26	Scottish Premiership	28	2	2	0	1	0	5 (Note: Appearances in UEFA Conference League)	0	36	2
Aberdeen	2026–27	Scottish Premiership	13	0	0	0	6	0	0	0	19	0
Aberdeen	Total		41	2	2	0	7	0	5	0	55	2
Career total			473	65	37	9	32	1	42	3	584	78

=== International ===
As of match played 18 November 2024

Appearances and goals by national team and year
National team	Year	Apps	Goals
Scotland	2017	4	1
Scotland	2018	7	0
Scotland	2019	8	1
Scotland	2020	3	0
Scotland	2021	8	0
Scotland	2022	10	2
Scotland	2023	8	1
Scotland	2024	5	0
Total		53	5

Scotland score listed first, score column indicates score after each Armstrong goal.

List of international goals scored by Stuart Armstrong
No.	Date	Venue	Cap	Opponent	Score	Result	Competition	Ref.
1	1 September 2017	LFF Stadium, Vilnius, Lithuania	3	Lithuania	1–0	3–0	2018 FIFA World Cup qualification	
2	13 October 2019	Hampden Park, Glasgow, Scotland	18	San Marino	6–0	6–0	UEFA Euro 2020 qualification	
3	14 June 2022	Vazgen Sargsyan Republican Stadium, Yerevan, Armenia	36	Armenia	1–1	4–1	2022–23 UEFA Nations League B	
4	14 June 2022	Vazgen Sargsyan Republican Stadium, Yerevan, Armenia	36	Armenia	2–1	4–1	2022–23 UEFA Nations League B	
5	19 November 2023	Hampden Park, Glasgow, Scotland	48	Norway	3–2	3–3	UEFA Euro 2024 qualification	

== Honours ==
Celtic

- Scottish Premiership: 2014–15, 2015–16, 2016–17, 2017–18
- Scottish Cup: 2016–17, 2017–18
- Scottish League Cup: 2016–17, 2017–18

Vancouver Whitecaps

- Canadian Championship: 2024

Individual

- Scottish Premier League Young Player of the Month: February 2013
- SFWA Young Player of the Year: 2012–13
- PFA Scotland Team of the Year (Scottish Premiership): 2013–14, 2014–15, 2016–17
