= Ardisson =

Ardisson is a European surname.

== People with the surname ==
- Alexandra Valetta-Ardisson (born 1976), French politician
- Béatrice Ardisson (1963–2026), French composer
- Edmond Ardisson (1904–1983), French actor
- George Ardisson (1931–2014), Italian actor
- Thierry Ardisson (1949–2025), French television producer and host
- Victor Ardisson (1872–1944), French grave robber

== See also ==
- Ardissone
