= Ardissone =

Ardissone is a surname. Notable people with the surname include:

- Francesco Ardissone (1837–1910, Ardiss.), Italian algologist and botanist
- Laura Ardissone (born 1969), Italian sprinter
- Mario Ardissone (1900–1975), Italian footballer
- Yolande Ardissone (born 1927), French painter

== See also ==
- Ardisson
