= Cocconeis elegans =

Scientific classification
- Domain: Eukaryota
- Clade: Sar
- Clade: Stramenopiles
- Division: Ochrophyta
- Clade: Bacillariophyta
- Class: Bacillariophyceae
- Order: Cocconeidales
- Family: Cocconeidaceae
- Genus: Cocconeis
- Species: C. elegans

Binomial name
- Cocconeis elegans F. Ardissone, 1864

Species of single-celled organism

Cocconeis elegans is a species of diatom. It is found in Sicily.
