= Sylvain Augier =

French television and radio show host (1955–2024)

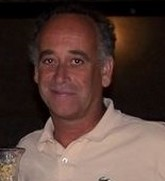
- Augier in 2006
- Born: 7 May 1955; Toulouse, France
- Died: 16 March 2024 (aged 68); Lecques, France
- Education: Institut d'études politiques de Toulouse
- Occupations: Television show host Radio show host

Sylvain Augier (7 May 1955 – 16 March 2024) was a French television and radio show host.

Augier was particularly well known for his presentation of the France 3 shows Faut pas rêver and La Carte aux trésors from 1990 to 2005.

== Biography ==
Born in Toulouse on 7 May 1955, Augier was the son of Pierre Augier and Hélène Pigasse and first cousin of investment banker Matthieu Pigasse and editor-in-chief of Public magazine Nicolas Pigasse. Sylvain spent his childhood in Forgues and graduated from the Institut d'études politiques de Toulouse in 1976. He then moved to Paris to participate in the École nationale d'administration competition, but withdrew despite his eligibility. In 1978, he took part in his military service in Nicaragua.

In 1979, Augier began his career in journalism as a reporter for France 2, for whom he presented several shows until 1998, including Sexy Folies. In 2001, he hosted Sylvain Augier en toute liberté on Sud Radio. From August 2011 to June 2012, he presented the show Les Trésors de la musique for Radio Classique. From July 2014 to 2017, he hosted Qu'est-ce qui vous fait courir ?. After his retirement from media, he moved to Lecques. He had been paralyzed in his right foot following a hang-gliding accident in 1988.

Sylvain Augier died following a sudden illness in Lecques, on 16 March 2024, at the age of 68.

== Publications ==
- Les babystoires : Éclats d'enfance, éclats de rire (1995)
- Carnets de routes (1999)
- Survie mode d'emploi : Les astuces d'un aventurier des temps modernes (2001)
- Europe et merveilles (2005)
- L’instant où tout a basculé (2008)
- Le doute et la foi : Sylvain Augier rencontre soeur Emmanuelle (2009)
- Je reviens de loin (2023)
