= Christian Authier =

French writer and journalist (born 1969)

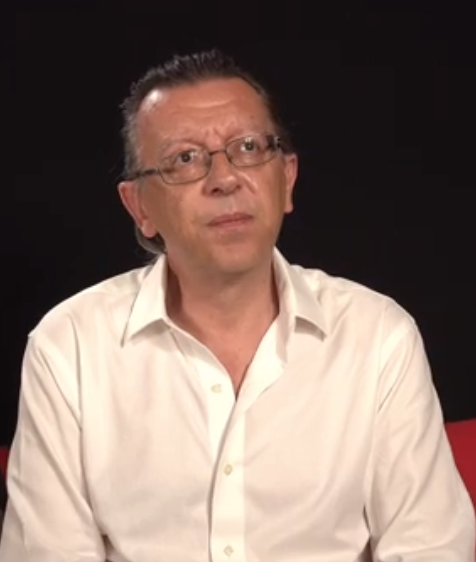
- In a 2025 interview
- Born: 1969 (age 56–57); Toulouse, France
- Education: University of Toulouse II; Institut d'études politiques de Toulouse
- Occupations: Writer, journalist

Christian Authier (born 1969) is a French writer and journalist. He has a master's degree in history from the University of Toulouse II and a degree from the Institut d'études politiques de Toulouse. His second novel, Les Liens défaits from 2006, received the Roger Nimier Prize. He received the 2014 Prix Renaudot de l'essai for De chez nous. He has written several non-fiction books about cinema, including two devoted to Clint Eastwood. He has also worked for Le Figaro littéraire.

== Bibliography ==
=== Novels ===
- Enterrement de vie de garçon, Éditions Stock, 2004
- Les Liens défaits, Éditions Stock, 2006
- Une si douce fureur, Éditions Stock, 2006
- Une Belle époque, Éditions Stock, 2008
- Une certaine fatigue, Éditions Stock, 2012
- Soldat d'Allah, Éditions Grasset and Fasquelle, 2014
- Des heures heureuses, Flammarion, 2018
- Demi-siècle, Paris, Flammarion, 2021
- L'ouverture des hostilités, Presses de la cité, 2022
- Comme un Père, Éditions du Rocher, 2025

=== Non-fiction ===
- Patrick Besson, Le Rocher, 1998
- Foot Business, Éditions Hachette, 2001
- Les Bouffons du foot, Le Rocher, 2002
- Clint Eastwood, Fitway Publishing Éditions, 2005
- Lady B, Éditions Le Castor Astral, 2007
- Remix # 4, Éditions Hachette Littératures, 2008
- Deuxièmes séances, Éditions Stock, 2009
- De chez nous, Éditions Stock, 2014
- Dictionnaire chic de littérature française, Ecriture, 2015
- Le Sarkozysme, Paris, UPPR Editions, 2016
- Les Mondes de Michel Déon: une biographie Séguier, 2018
- Un autre Toulouse, Cairn, 2019
- Petit Éloge amoureux de Toulouse, Privat, 2021
- Houellebecq politique, Flammarion, 2022
