= Philippe Bélaval =

French official (born 1955)

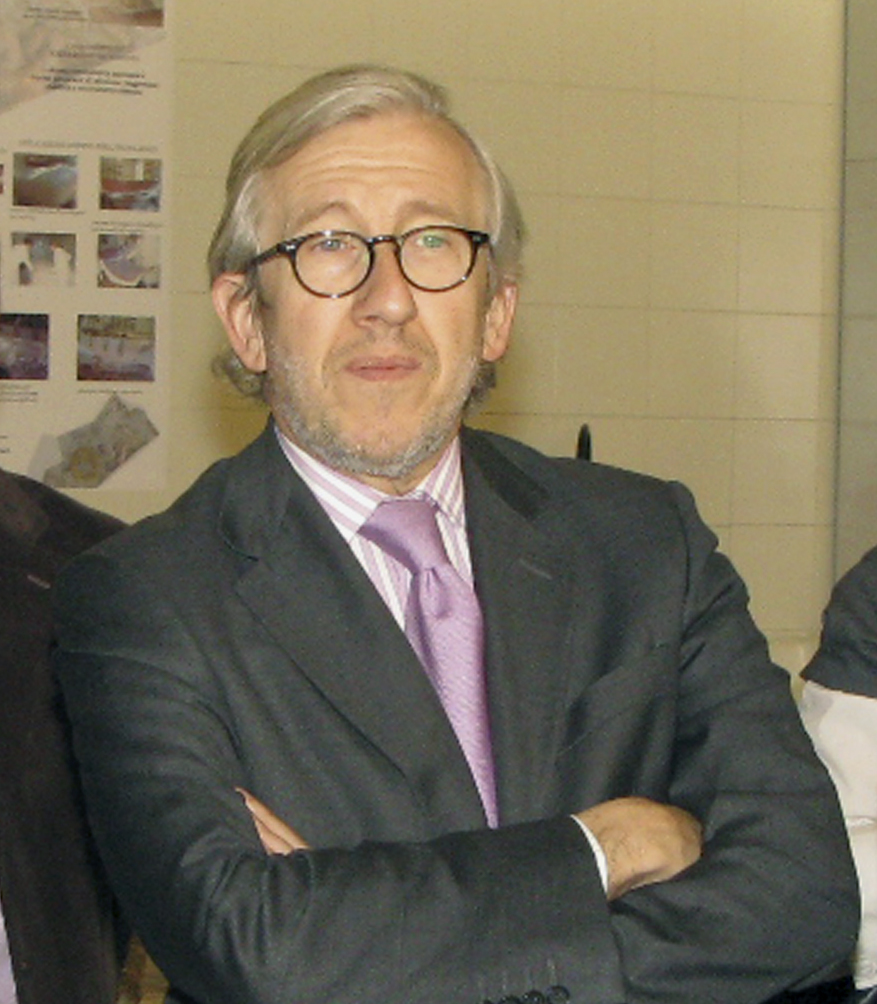
Philippe Bélaval in 2011

Philippe Bélaval (French pronunciation: [filip belaval], born 21 August 1955) is a French high-ranking official.

He has been president of the Centre des monuments nationaux since 2012.

== Life ==
Born in Toulouse, Belaval graduated from the Institut d'études politiques de Toulouse (class 1975). He is a former student of the École nationale d'administration, and was an auditor of the 58th national session of the Institut des hautes études de défense nationale. He has been a member of the Conseil d'État since 1979.

== Honours ==
- Officier de la Légion d'honneur
  - Chevalier de la Légion d'honneur decree dated 24 March 1998
- Commandeur de l'ordre national du Mérite
  - Officier de l'ordre national du Mérite decree dated 11 March 2002
- Commandeur de l'ordre des Arts et des Lettres
