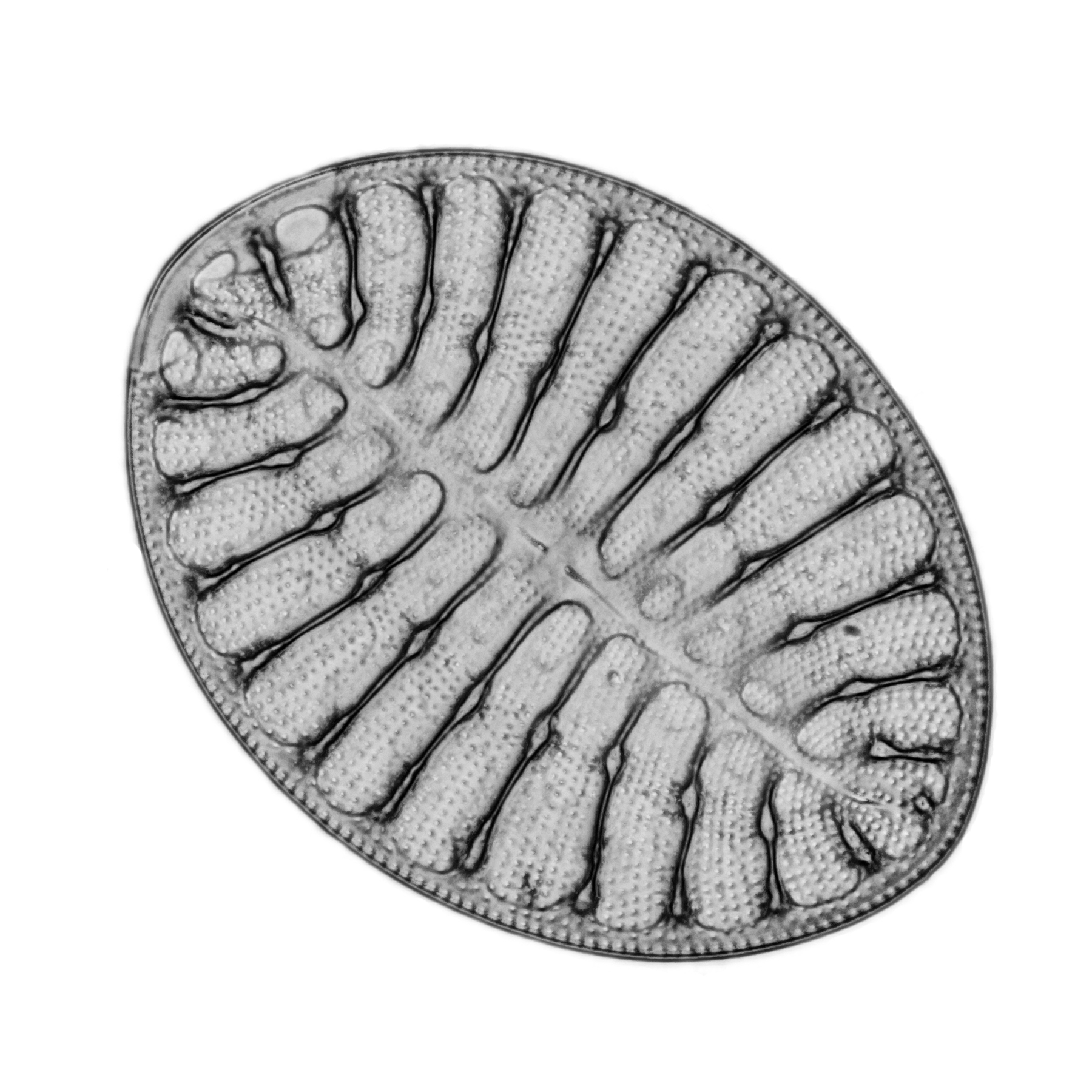
- Cocconeis sp.

Scientific classification
- Domain: Eukaryota
- Clade: Sar
- Clade: Stramenopiles
- Division: Ochrophyta
- Clade: Bacillariophyta
- Class: Bacillariophyceae
- Order: Cocconeidales
- Family: Cocconeidaceae
- Genus: Cocconeis; Ehrenberg, 1837

Species
- Several, including: Cocconeis ceticola; Cocconeis duplex; Cocconeis elegans F. Ardissone; Cocconeis pinnata

= Cocconeis =

Genus of single-celled organisms

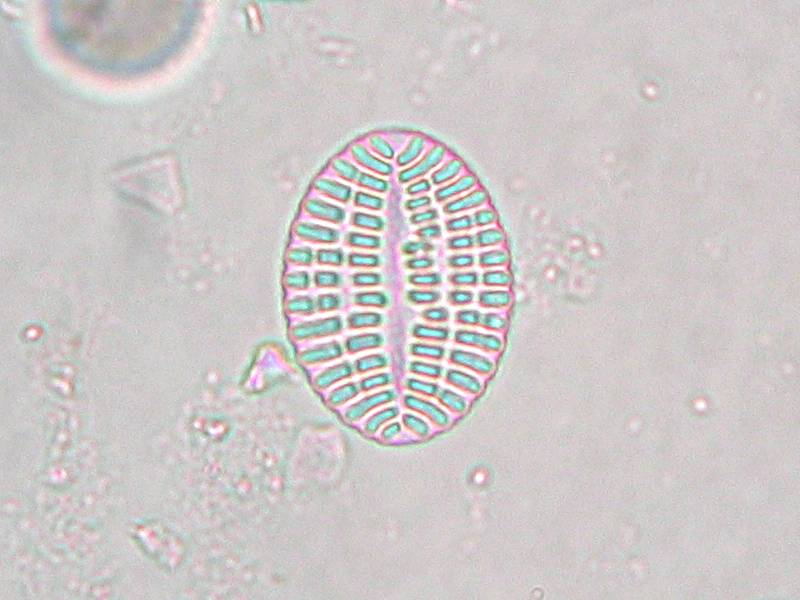
Cocconeis duplex

Cocconeis is a genus of diatoms. Members of the genus are elliptically shaped diatoms.

The green alga Cladophora is frequently covered with Cocconeis, as are individuals of Antarctic minke whales, often found with orange-brown to yellowish patches of Cocconeis ceticola on their bodies.
