= Institut d'études politiques de Toulouse =

Coordinates: 43°36′27″N 1°26′17″E

Institut d’études politiques de Toulouse
- Type: Grande école Institut d'études politiques (public research university Political Science school)
- Established: 1948; 78 years ago
- Affiliations: Conférence des grandes écoles, Federal University of Toulouse Midi-Pyrénées
- Budget: €9M
- Director: Eric Darras
- Academic staff: 56 permanent professors
- Students: 1,581; 13% international; 61% female
- Location: Toulouse, France
- Campus: Metropolitan
- Language: English-only & French-only instruction
- Website: http://www.sciencespo-toulouse.fr/

Sciences Po Toulouse (French pronunciation: [sjɑ̃s po tuluz]; Occitan: Sciéncias Po Tolosa), or the Institut d'études politiques de Toulouse ([ɛ̃stity detyd pɔlitik də tuluz], Institut d'estudis politics de Tolosa) is one of the nine Institutes of Political Studies of France. Based in the center of Toulouse, France, next to the Université Toulouse 1 Capitole, this extremely selective political science grande école was founded by a Decree in 1948 under the name of Institut d'études politiques de l'université de Toulouse. Since 2004 the courses have been 5 years long.

== History ==
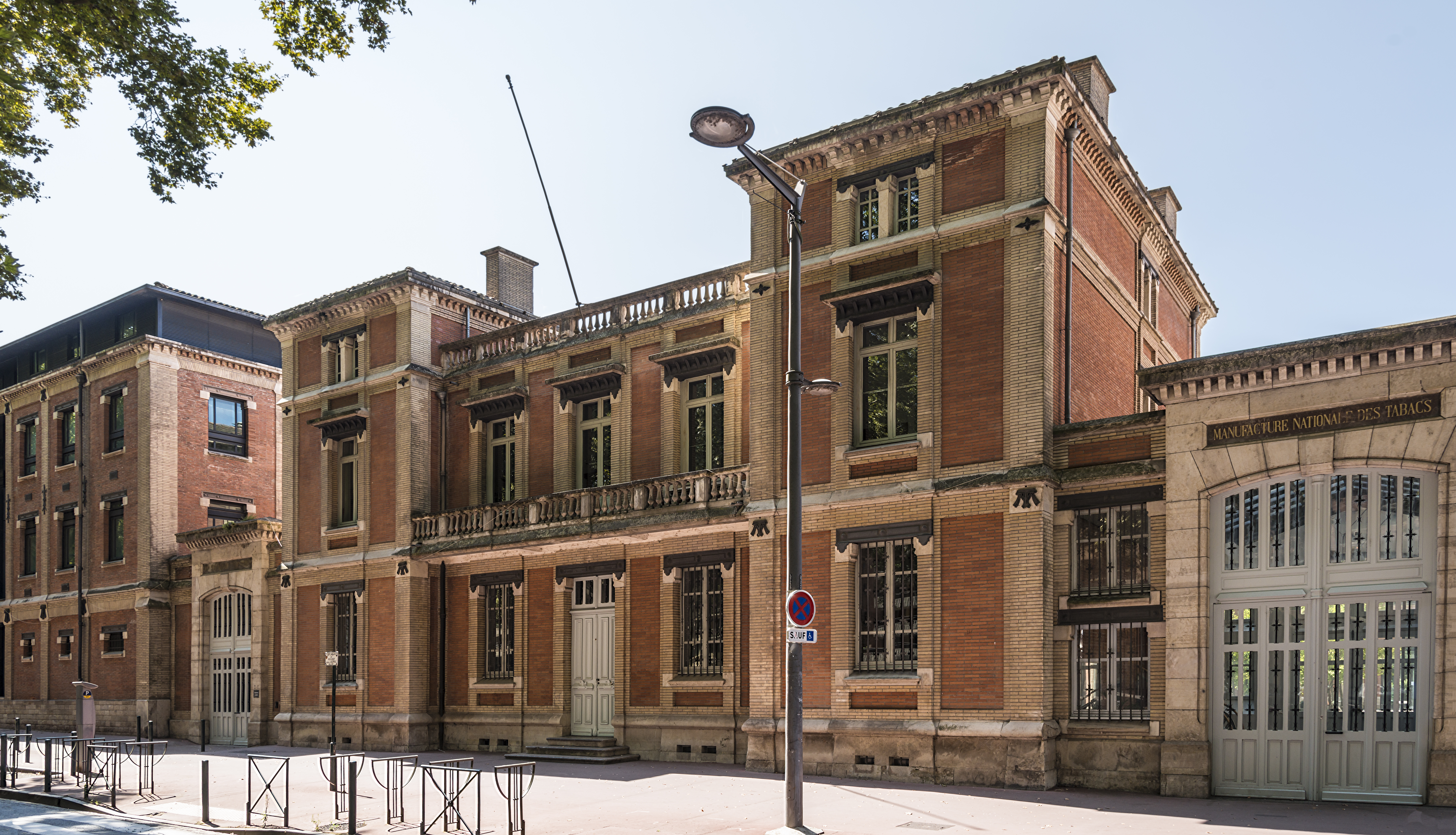
Sciences Po Toulouse

Four institutes of political studies (in Bordeaux, Lyon, Grenoble and Toulouse) were established in 1946 following an executive decree by General Charles de Gaulle. The institut d'études politiques de Toulouse is one of them as an autonomous body within Toulouse 1 University Capitole. Since 2008, the cooperation between the different institut d'études politiques has increased and its students can now leave their institute in order to apply nearly freely in another one, furthermore, the competitive written examination (for students selection) is co-organized with five other institutes, respectively in Aix-en-Provence, Lille, Lyon, Rennes and Strasbourg.

=== Directors ===
- 1948 - 1955: Paul Couzinet, university professor
- 1955 - 1980: Paul Ourliac, university professor in legal history
- 1980 - 1995: André Cabanis, university professor in legal history
- 1995 - 2000: Christian Hen, university professor in European public law
- 2000 - 2010: Laure Ortiz, university professor in public law
- 2010 - 2016: Philippe Raimbault, university professor in public law
- July 4, 2016 - October 31: Christopher Charles, Lecturer in Public Law (provisional administrator)
- 2016 - 2021: Olivier Brossard, university professor in Economics
- September 1, 2021: Eric Darras, university professor in political science

=== Organisation ===
Sciences Po institutes are Grandes Écoles, a French institution of higher education that is separate from, but parallel and connected to the main framework of the French public university system. Similar to the Ivy League in the United States, Oxbridge in the UK, and C9 League in China, Grandes Écoles are elite academic institutions that admit students through an extremely competitive process. Alums go on to occupy elite positions within government, administration, and corporate firms in France.

The institute is modeled on the former École Libre des Sciences Politiques, and as such, Sciences Po uses an interdisciplinary approach to education that provides student generalists with the high level of grounding in skills that they need in History, Law, Economic Sciences, Sociology, Political science and International relations, enriched by specialization in years 4 and 5, after a 3rd year either on a professional placement in France or overseas or alternatively studying at a foreign university.

Although these institutes are more expensive than public universities in France, Grandes Écoles typically have much smaller class sizes and student bodies, and many of their programs are taught in English. International internships, study abroad opportunities, and close ties with government and the corporate world are a hallmark of the Grandes Écoles. Many of the top ranked schools in Europe are members of the Conférence des Grandes Écoles (CGE), as are the Sciences Po institutions. Degrees from Sciences Po are accredited by the Conférence des Grandes Écoles and awarded by the Ministry of National Education (France) (French: Le Ministère de L'éducation Nationale).

== Teaching ==
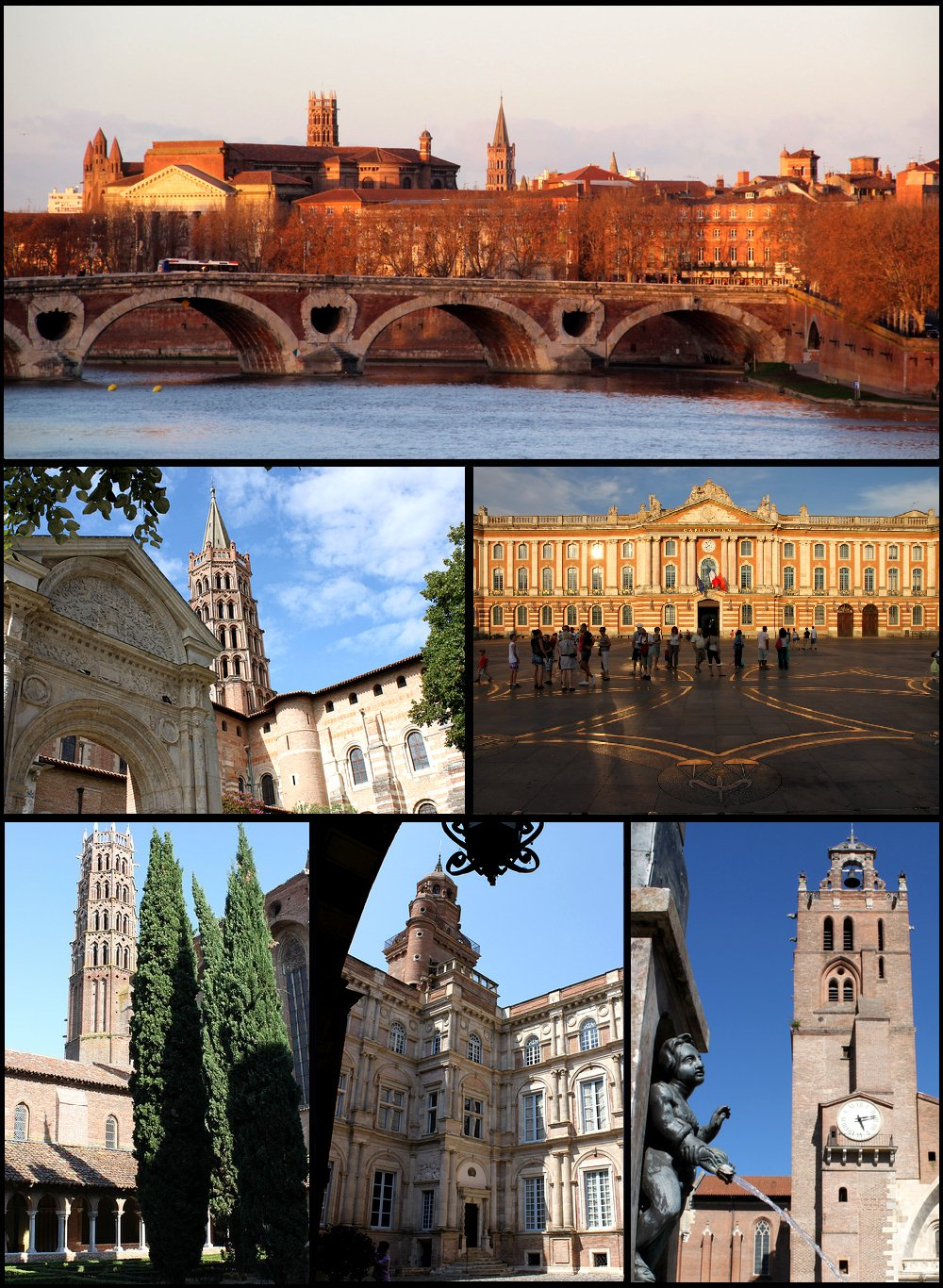

Like the other institutes of political studies, it provides students with general training in political sciences, law, sociology, economics, general knowledge, and history. Since 2004, Courses have been 5 years long. it main diploma is equivalent to a master's degree.

=== Notable faculty ===
- Jacques Cantier, historian
- Jean-François Soulet, historian
- Patrick Champagne, sociologist
- Jean-Michel Ducomte, lawyer
- Jean-Louis Loubet del Bayle, sociologist
- Laure Ortiz, director of the Institut d'études politiques de Toulouse between 2000 and 2010
- Robert Marconis, geographer

=== Notable alumni ===
- Sylvain Augier, journalist
- Christian Authier, writer
- Philippe Bélaval, civil servant
- Audrey Crespo-Mara, journalist
- Henri Cuq, politician
- Philippe Folliot, politician
- François Fontan, politician
- Hélène Lam Trong, filmmaker
- Gérard Mestrallet, Chairman of the Board and CEO of GDF Suez
