= Tout le monde en parle (French talk show) =

- Genre: Talk show
- Created by: Serge Khalfon
- Presented by: Thierry Ardisson
- Country of origin: France
- Original language: French
- No. of seasons: 8

Production
- Producer: Catherine Barma
- Running time: 180 minutes

Original release
- Network: France 2
- Release: September 5, 1998 – July 8, 2006

Tout le monde en parle (French pronunciation: [tu l(ə) mɔ̃d ɑ̃ paʁl]; "Everybody's talking about it") is a French talk show broadcast on France 2 from September 5, 1998 to July 8, 2006. It was hosted by Thierry Ardisson and produced by Catherine Barma.

== Format ==
During its first season (1998–1999), the show took the form of societal debates; in September 1999 it was re-formatted as a talk show.

The show featured guests who were current newsmakers, including actors, writers, singers, politicians, and athletes. Guests discussed their life and engaged in thematic interviews. The show gradually acquired a provocative reputation, because the host did not hesitate to ask guests questions about their private and sexual lives.

Thierry Ardisson was the main host, initially accompanied by Laurent Ruquier and Linda Hardy. Later, he turned to duos Éric and Ramzy, then Kad and Olivier. Finally, he opted for comedian Laurent Baffie as co-host until the end of the show.

== International adaptations ==
A Canadian version debuted in 2004 on Ici Radio-Canada Télé with Guy A. Lepage as host and Dany Turcotte as le fou du roi ("the jester"). Although the title and concept is the same, there is no other connection and production and content is entirely separate.

The format has also been adopted in Algeria and Lebanon, both under the name Hadiss El Balad ("Talk of the town"), and in Albania as Zonë e lirë ("Free Zone").

== See also ==
- List of French television series
- List of Quebec television series imports and exports
