= Sékou Mara =

French footballer (born 2002)

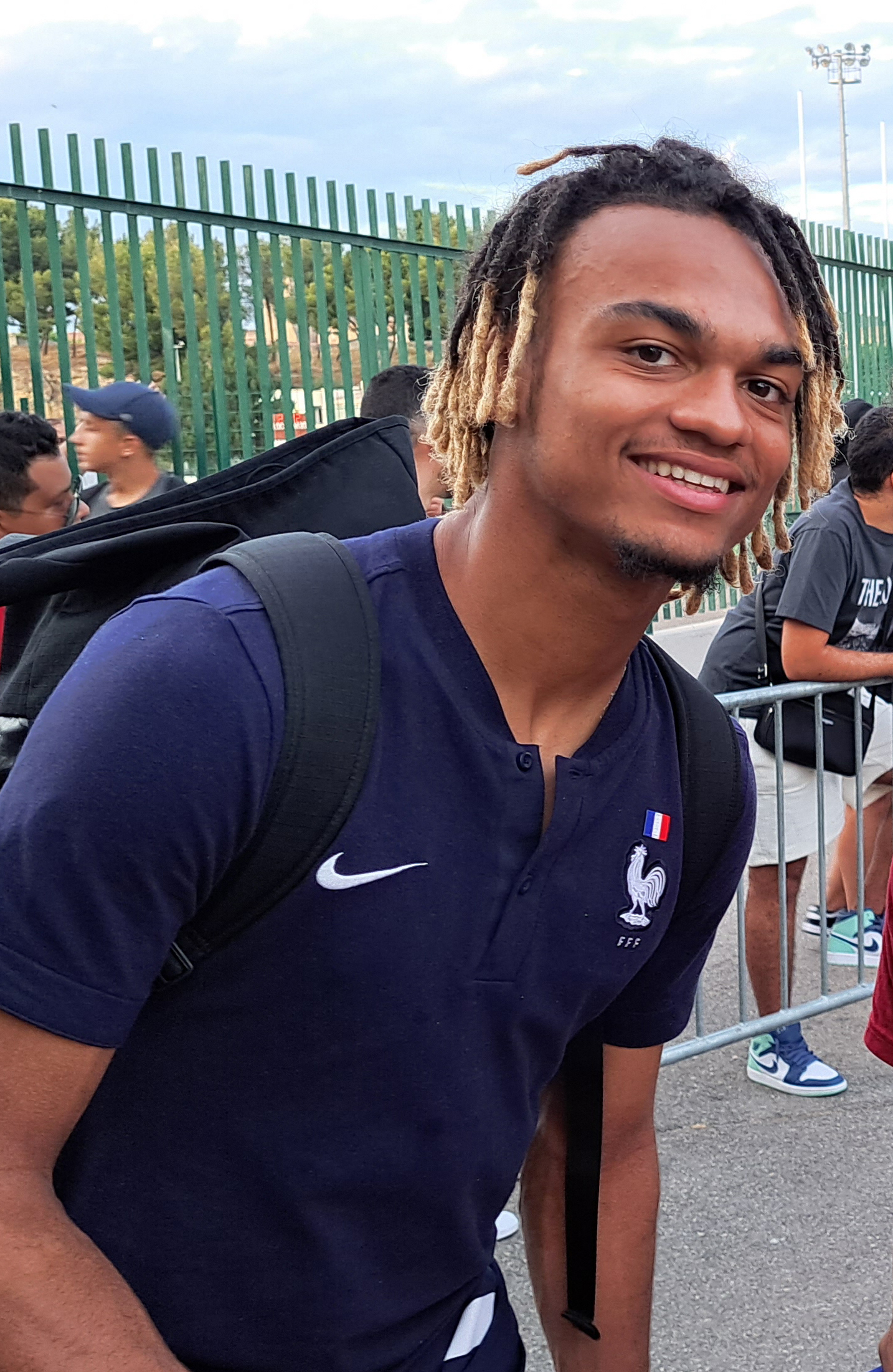
- Mara in 2022

Personal information
- Date of birth: 30 July 2002 (age 24)
- Place of birth: Paris, France
- Height: 1.83 m (6 ft 0 in)
- Position: Forward

Team information
- Current team: Strasbourg

Youth career
- 2011–2014: Paris Saint-Germain
- 2014–2017: Boulogne-Billancourt
- 2017–2021: Bordeaux

Senior career*
Years	Team	Apps	(Gls)
2019–2020	Bordeaux B	14	(5)
2020–2022	Bordeaux	34	(7)
2022–2024	Southampton	50	(4)
2024–	Strasbourg	27	(1)
2025–2026	→ Auxerre (loan)	27	(3)

International career
2017	France U16	2	(1)
2018–2019	France U17	4	(0)
2021–2022	France U20	10	(6)
2021–2023	France U21	4	(1)
- * Club domestic league appearances and goals as of 29 August 2026

Sékou Mara (born 30 July 2002) is a French professional footballer who plays as a forward for Ligue 1 club Strasbourg.

Mara is a product of the Bordeaux academy and made his professional debut for the club in February 2021. He moved to English club Southampton in July 2022 before returning to France with Strasbourg in August 2024. Mara spent the 2025–26 season on loan at Auxerre. He has represented his country at youth levels.

== Club career ==
=== Bordeaux ===
Mara made his professional debut for Bordeaux in a 2–0 Coupe de France loss to Toulouse on 10 February 2021. He scored his first professional goal in a 1–0 Ligue 1 win over Rennes on 2 May 2021. By scoring this goal, he became the youngest player to score a league goal for Bordeaux in almost 14 years.

=== Southampton ===
On 21 July 2022, it was confirmed by Bordeaux that they had accepted an offer from Southampton for Mara, and that the deal was subject to a medical. On 25 July 2022, Southampton confirmed that Mara had signed a four-year deal with the club. On 13 August 2022, Mara made his first Premier League appearance in Southampton’s 2–2 draw with Leeds United after he replaced Jan Bednarek. On 11 January 2023, Mara scored his first goal for the club in a 2–0 quarter final EFL Cup victory against Manchester City. On 8 April 2023, Mara scored his first Premier League goal in a 1–4 defeat against Manchester City.

On 13 April 2024, he came on as a substitute for Ché Adams in the 80th minute of a 3–2 victory against Watford. Shortly afterwards, Mara struck Ryan Porteous in an unpunished off-the-ball incident. On 16 April 2024, the Football Association gave Mara a three-match suspension for violent conduct.

=== Strasbourg ===
On 21 August 2024, Mara joined Strasbourg on a five-year contract. On 5 September 2025, Mara was loaned by Auxerre, also in Ligue 1.

== International career ==
Mara is a youth international for France. He has played matches at under-16, under-17, under-20, and under-21 level.

== Personal life ==
Mara's mother, Audrey Crespo-Mara, is a French journalist and television presenter, and his father, Aliou Mara, is a Senegalese entrepreneur.

== Career statistics ==
As of match played 29 August 2026

Appearances and goals by club, season and competition
Club	Season	League			National cup		League cup		Other		Total	
Club	Season	Division	Apps	Goals	Apps	Goals	Apps	Goals	Apps	Goals	Apps	Goals
Bordeaux B	2019–20	Championnat National 3	11	5	—		—		—		11	5
Bordeaux B	2020–21	Championnat National 3	3	0	—		—		—		3	0
Bordeaux B	Total		14	5	—		—		—		14	5
Bordeaux	2020–21	Ligue 1	8	1	1	0	—		—		9	1
Bordeaux	2021–22	Ligue 1	26	6	1	0	—		—		27	6
Bordeaux	Total		34	7	2	0	—		—		36	7
Southampton	2022–23	Premier League	22	1	3	0	5	1	—		30	2
Southampton	2023–24	Championship	28	3	4	3	1	0	1 (Note: Appearance in Championship play-offs)	0	34	6
Southampton	2024–25	Premier League	0	0	0	0	0	0	—		0	0
Southampton	Total		50	4	7	3	6	1	1	0	64	8
Strasbourg	2024–25	Ligue 1	25	1	2	2	—		—		27	3
Strasbourg	2025–26	Ligue 1	0	0	0	0	—		—		0	0
Strasbourg	2026–27	Ligue 1	2	0	0	0	—		—		2	0
Strasbourg	Total		27	1	2	2	—		—		29	3
Auxerre (loan)	2025–26	Ligue 1	27	3	0	0	—		—		27	3
Career total			152	20	11	5	6	1	1	0	170	26

== Honours ==
Individual

- Maurice Revello Tournament Golden Boot: 2022
- Maurice Revello Tournament Silver Ball: 2022
- Maurice Revello Tournament Best XI: 2022
