= Audrey Crespo-Mara =

French journalist and television presenter

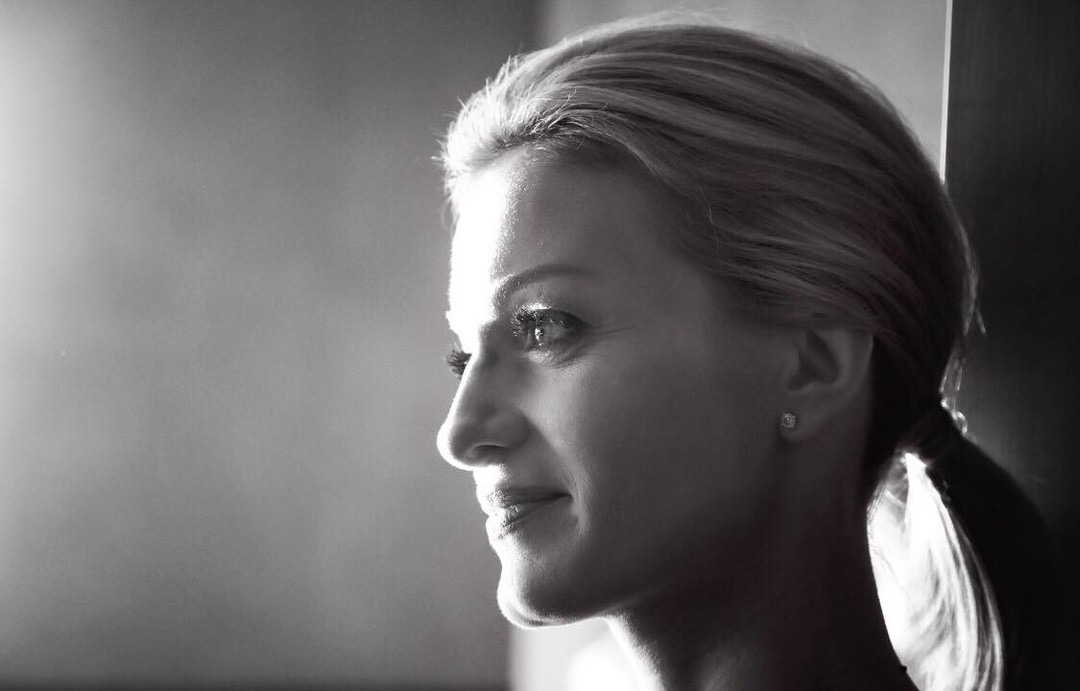
- Born: 8 July 1976 (age 50); Meaux, Seine-et-Marne, France
- Education: Institut d'études politiques de Toulouse; Centre de formation des journalistes
- Occupations: Journalist; News anchor
- Television: TF1 (1999–present); LCI (2007–present)
- Spouse: Thierry Ardisson (m. 2014; died 2025)
- Partner: Aliou Mara (formerly)
- Children: 2, including Sékou Mara

Audrey Crespo-Mara (born 8 July 1976) is a French journalist and television presenter.

== Life and career ==
Crespo-Mara was born in Meaux in the department of Seine-et-Marne. She graduated from the Institut d'études politiques de Toulouse in 1997, and at the CFJ (Centre de Formation des Journalistes) of Paris in 1999. During her studies, she worked for Radio France Toulouse, France Inter, TF1 and France 2.

In May 1999, Crespo-Mara joined the news service of TF1, where she produced societal and economic documentaries for the daily news for eight years. In September 2007, the chief director of LCI (news channel of the TF1 Group), Jean-Claude Dassier, gave her the opportunity to present the morning news LCI Matin from Monday to Thursday. Since January 2007, she also presents live special events on TF1 like the funeral of the Abbé Pierre the same month, the visit of Pope Benedict XVI in France in September 2008, the 20th anniversary of the Berlin Wall fall in November 2009 and the wedding of Prince William and Catherine Middleton in April 2011.

Since September 2009, while pursuing the presentation of LCI Matin, Crespo-Mara has presented Demain à la Une on the same channel, a weekly talk show where she interviews a personality from culture, politics, or art. In July 2011, she ended her presenting of the morning news. In September of that year, she succeeded Julien Arnaud in presenting the daily interview L'interview d'Audrey Crespo-Mara on LCI from Monday to Thursday in the late morning.

In September 2013, Crespo-Mara presented Parlon-en in the morning on the same channel. She also presents Vue sur la Planète, a weekly programme dedicated to ecology, and on Thursday Dans Nos Quartiers, a programme showing another perspective on the French suburbs.

== Personal life ==
Crespo-Mara has two children, one of whom is Sékou Mara, a professional footballer. She was the partner of television host Thierry Ardisson from November 2009 to his death in July 2025. They married on 21 June 2014.
