= Mario Ardissone =

Italian footballer

Personal information
- Date of birth: 9 October 1900
- Place of birth: Vercelli, Italy
- Date of death: 1975
- Position: Midfielder

Senior career*
Years	Team	Apps	(Gls)
1919–1935	Pro Vercelli	355	(75)

International career
1924	Italy	2	(0)
- * Club domestic league appearances and goals

Mario Ardissone (Italian pronunciation: [ˈmaːrjo ardisˈsoːne]; 9 October 1900 – 1975) was an Italian footballer who played as a midfielder.

== Career ==
Ardissone played for 6 seasons (161 games, 6 goals) in the Italian Serie A for U.S. Pro Vercelli Calcio. Ardissone made his debut for the Italy national football team on 20 January 1924 in a game against Austria. He was also part of Italy's squad at the 1924 Summer Olympics, but he did not play.
