= Béatrice Ardisson =

French composer (1963–2026)

- Born: Béatrice Loustalan; 26 July 1963; Auch, France
- Died: 18 February 2026 (aged 62)
- Occupation: Composer

Béatrice Ardisson (French: [beatʁˈis aʁdisˈɔ̃]; née Loustalan; 26 July 1963 – 18 February 2026) was a French composer.

Ardisson produced a variety of songs in the 1990s alongside her husband, Thierry Ardisson, whom she divorced in 2010.

== Death ==
Ardisson died from cancer on 18 February 2026, at the age of 62, just 8 months after her ex-husband.

== Discography ==
- La Musique de Paris Dernière (2000)
- La Musique de Tout le monde en parle (2002)
- Patchwork, la Musique de Christian Lacroix (2003)
- Cloclo Mania (2003)
- IndoMania (2004)
- Kong : 2 Volumes (2004, 2007)
- RioMania (2005)
- Mères et Filles - Comptoir des Cotonniers (2005)
- Fouquet's (2005)
- ClassicMania (2006)
- BowieMania (2007)
- J'irai dormir à Hollywood (2008)
- DylanMania (2009)
- Love from Jaipur (2009)
- SwingMania (2010)
- BeatlesMania (2011)
- Robert Mapplethorpe (2014)
