= Victor Ardisson =

French graverobber and necrophiliac

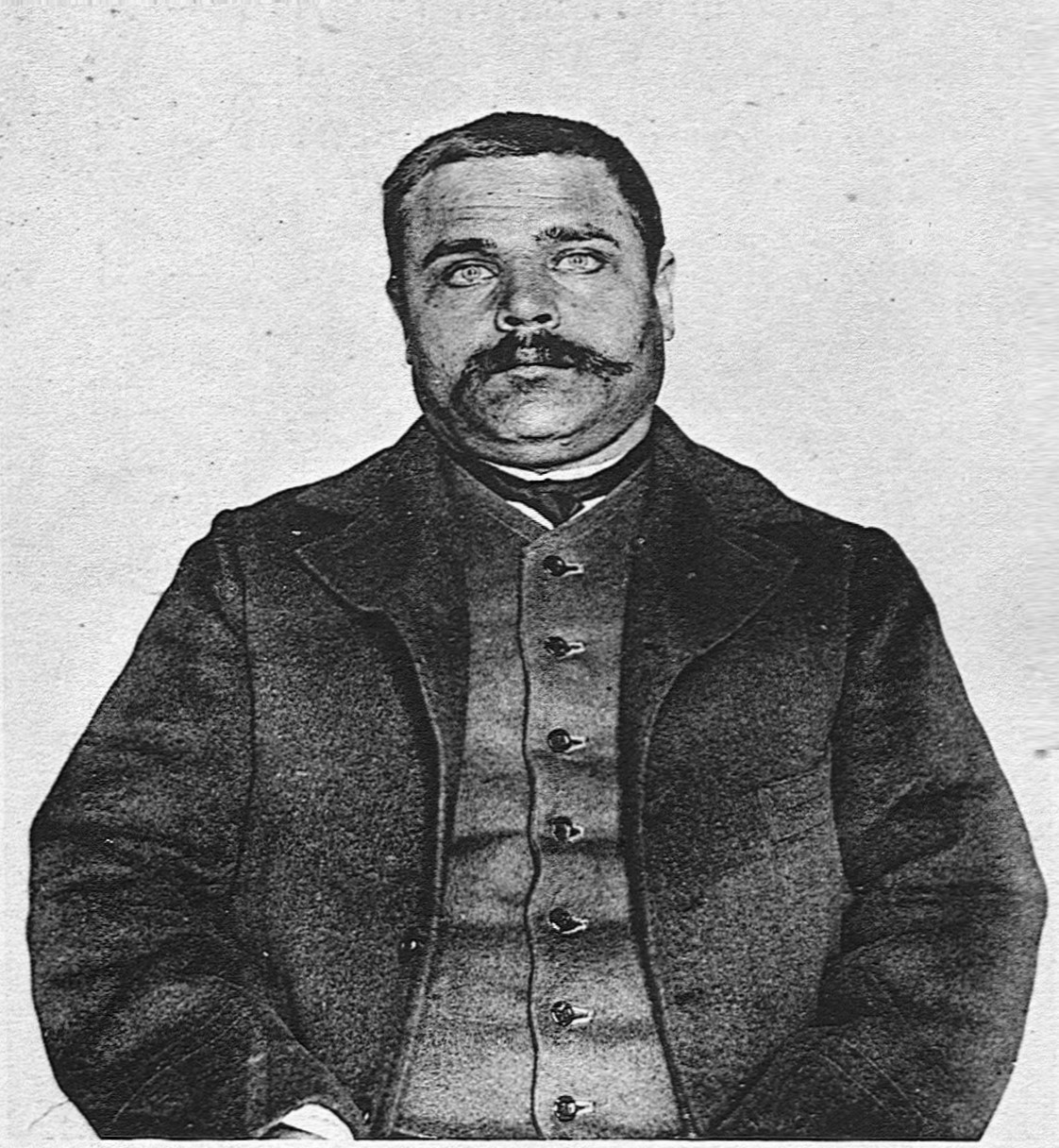
Ardisson in 1906

Victor Antoine Ardisson (5 September 1872 – 9 March 1944), nicknamed the "Vampire of Muy" (Vampire du Muy), was a French graverobber and necrophile.

He was born at Le Muy in Provence in southeastern France, and became an undertaker and gravedigger as an adult. He violated many bodies, especially those of young women, and mutilated and decapitated them in some cases. According to his confession, Ardisson regularly spoke to the corpses which he had retrieved, feeling genuine shock and hurt when they would not respond.

Victor Ardisson was arrested in 1901 upon multiple charges of the exhumation and violation of dead bodies.

Ardisson was examined by Dr. Alexis Epaulard, one of the first psychiatrists to associate necrophilia and vampirism. Epaulard diagnosed Ardisson as a "degenerate impulsive sadist and necrophile." Dr. Richard von Krafft-Ebing, who also studied the case, called Ardisson a "moron void of any moral sense."

Victor Ardisson was sentenced to spend the rest of his life in a psychiatric hospital at Pierrefeu-du-Var.

== Bibliography ==
- Alexis Épaulard, Vampirisme : nécrophilie, nécrosadisme, nécrophagie, Lyon, A. Storck, 1901.
- Mercier (Edmond), Dr., Belletrud (Michel), Contribution to the Study of Necrophilia. The Case Ardisson, Paris, G. Steinheil, 1906.
- Richard von Krafft-Ebing, Psychopathia Sexualis (twelfth edition), 1903.
