= Lecques =

- Commune
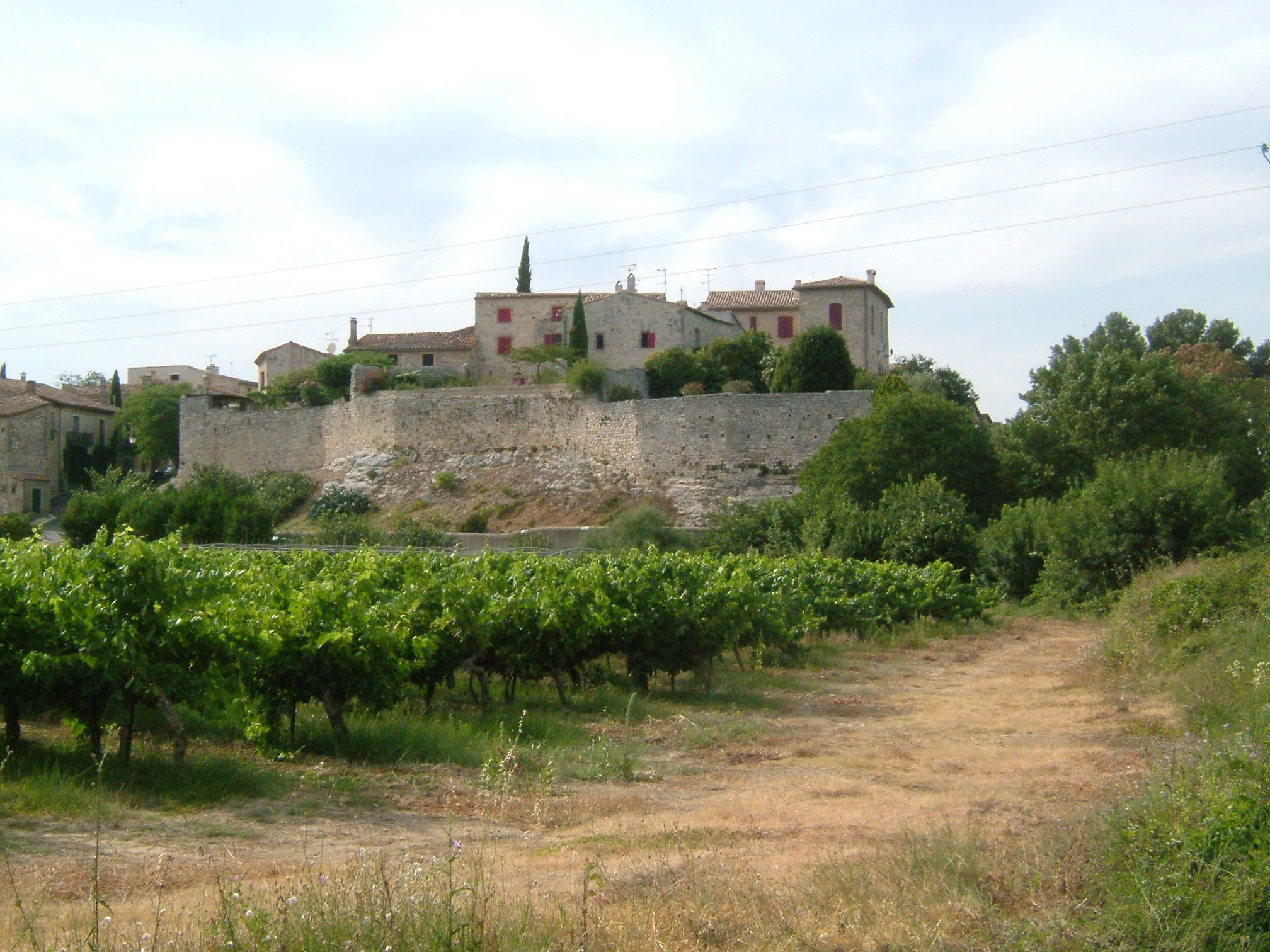
- View of Lecques from the south
- Location of Lecques
- Location within France Location within Occitanie
- Coordinates: 43°50′16″N 4°03′50″E
- Country: France
- Region: Occitania
- Department: Gard
- Arrondissement: Nîmes
- Canton: Calvisson
- Intercommunality: Pays de Sommières

Government
  - Mayor (2020–2026): Bernadette Poher
- Area^{1}: 5.2 km^{2} (2.0 sq mi)
- Elevation: 50 m (160 ft)
- Highest elevation: 111 m (364 ft)
- Lowest elevation: 26 m (85 ft)
- Population (2023): 473
  - Density: 91/km^{2} (240/sq mi)
- Time zone: UTC+01:00 (CET)
  - Summer (DST): UTC+02:00 (CEST)
- INSEE/Postal code: 30144 /30250
- ^{1} French Land Register data, which excludes lakes, ponds, glaciers > 1 km^{2} (0.386 sq mi or 247 acres) and river estuaries.

Lecques (French pronunciation: [lɛk]; Occitan: Lècas) is a commune in the Gard department in southern France.

It is built on rising ground, on the west bank of the River Vidourle, 6 km (3.7 mi) to the north and upstream of Sommières. The village centre is on a rocky outcrop that overhangs the bank of the river. Steps lead down to the bridge. Its elevation means it is protected from the 'vidourlades' or violent floods, for example, that of 9 September 2002. There are remains of the ramparts, the narrow medieval streets and a church.

== Etymology ==
The name 'Lecques' comes from the Celtic word 'leucas', meaning a settlement by a marker post on an ancient track.

== Population ==
Historical population
Year	Pop.	±% p.a.
1968	203	—
1975	165	−2.92%
1982	182	+1.41%
1990	215	+2.10%
1999	216	+0.05%
2007	333	+5.56%
2012	473	+7.27%
2017	470	−0.13%
2023	473	+0.11%
Source: INSEE

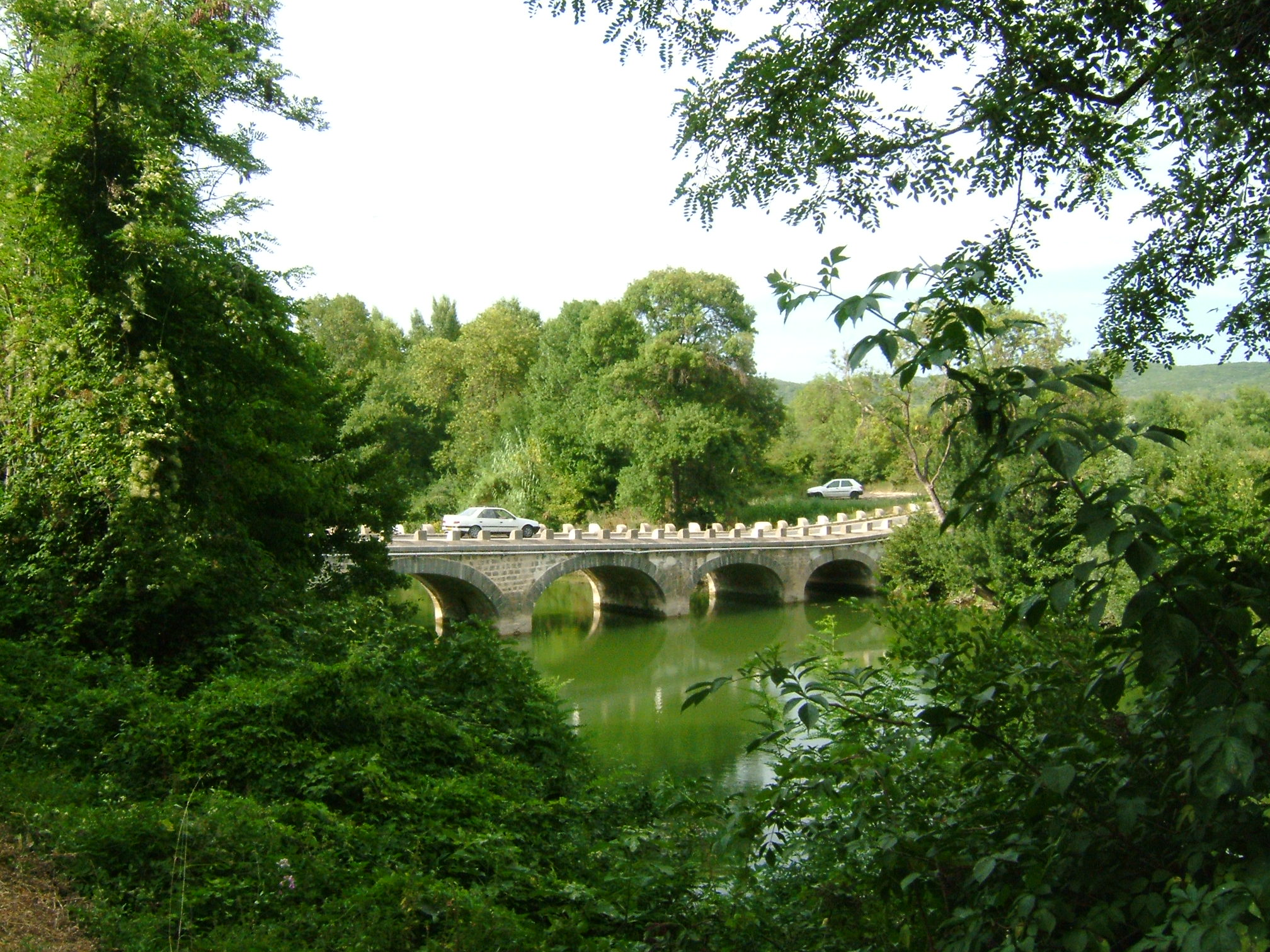
The bridge and River Vidourle

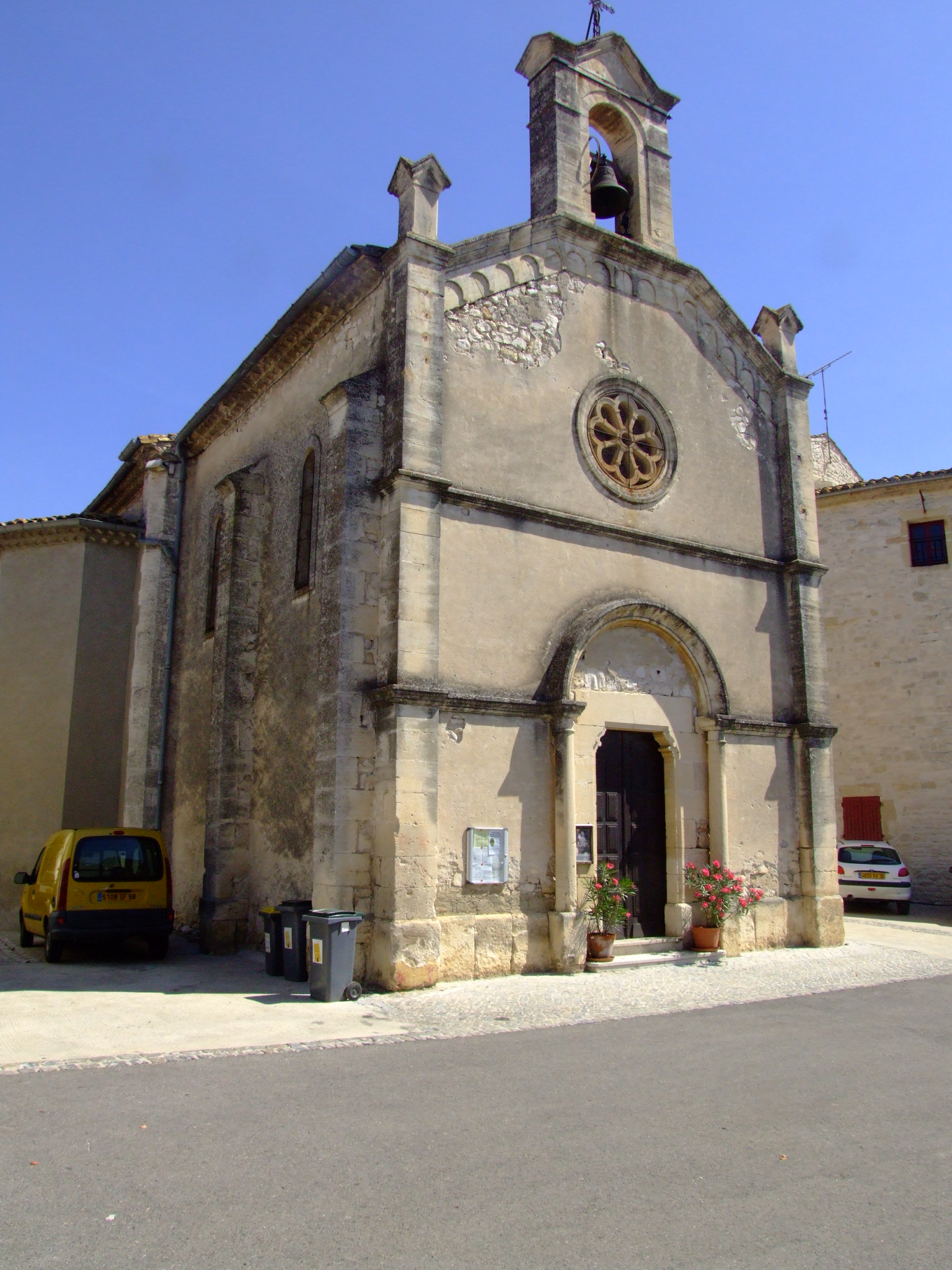
The church in the village

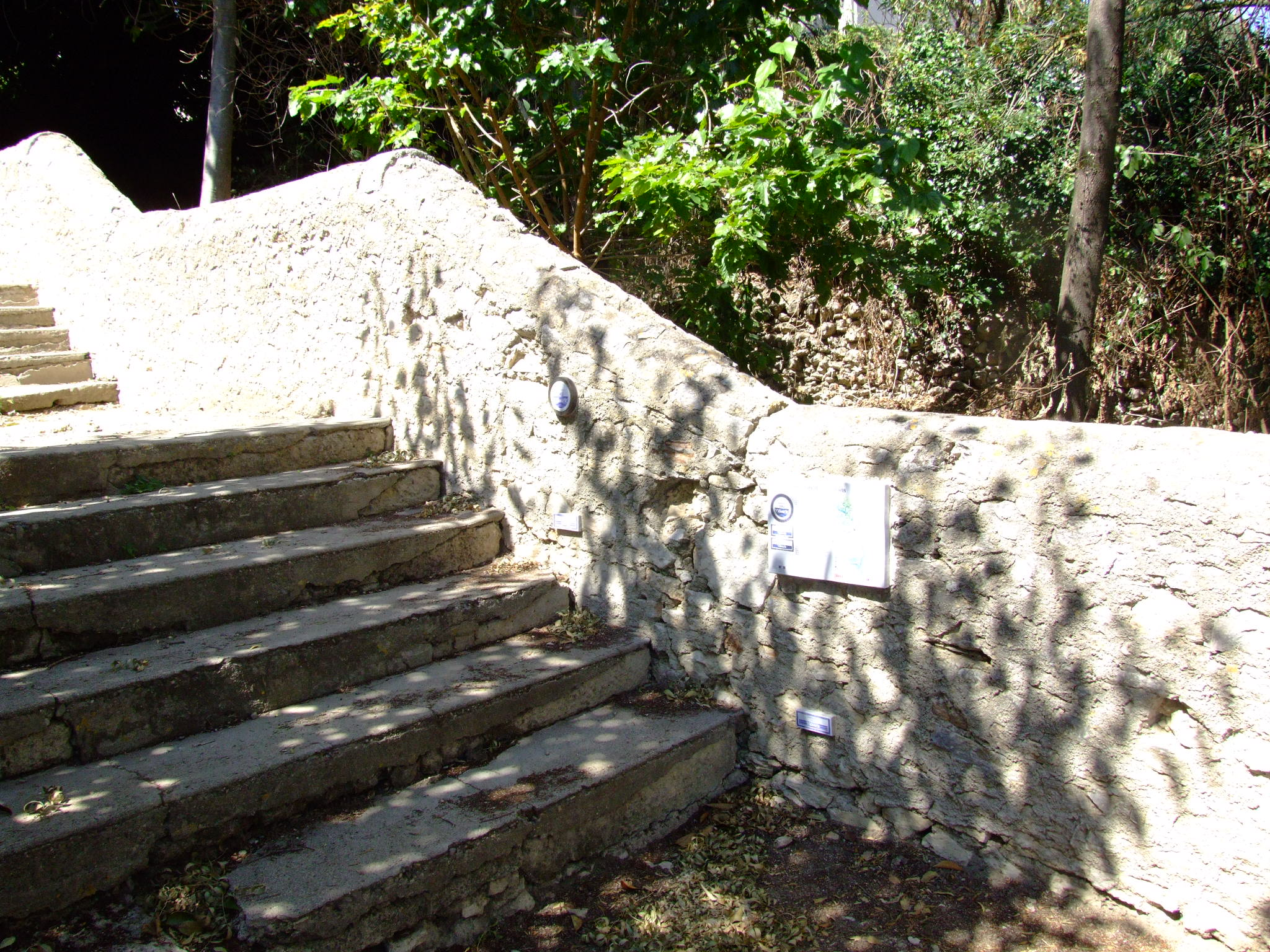
Steps from village to river, with markers of flood levels

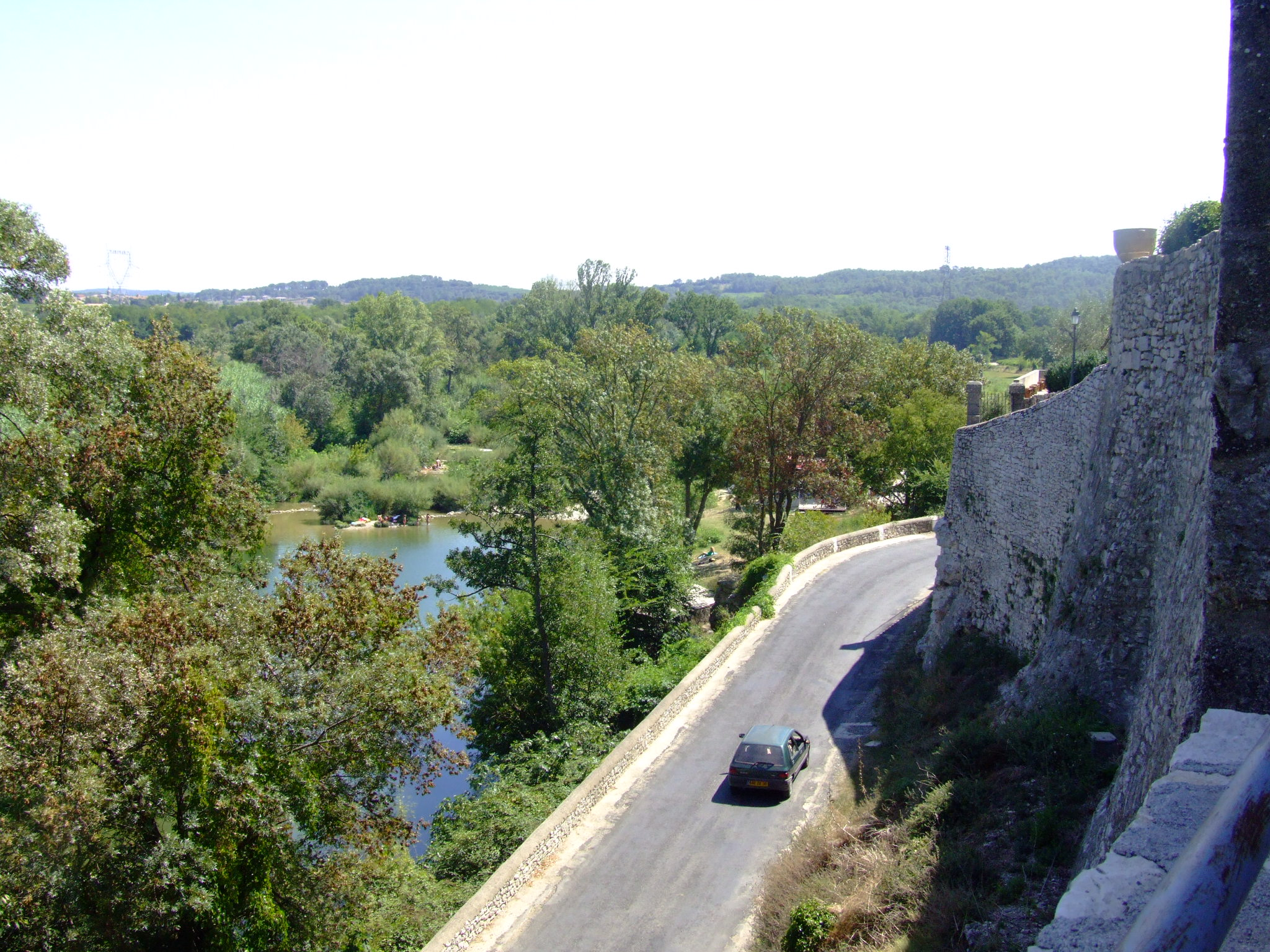
Swimming in the river

== See also ==
- Communes of the Gard department
