= Francesco Ardissone =

Italian algologist and botanist

Francesco Ardissone (8 September 1837 – 4 April 1910) was an Italian algologist and botanist.

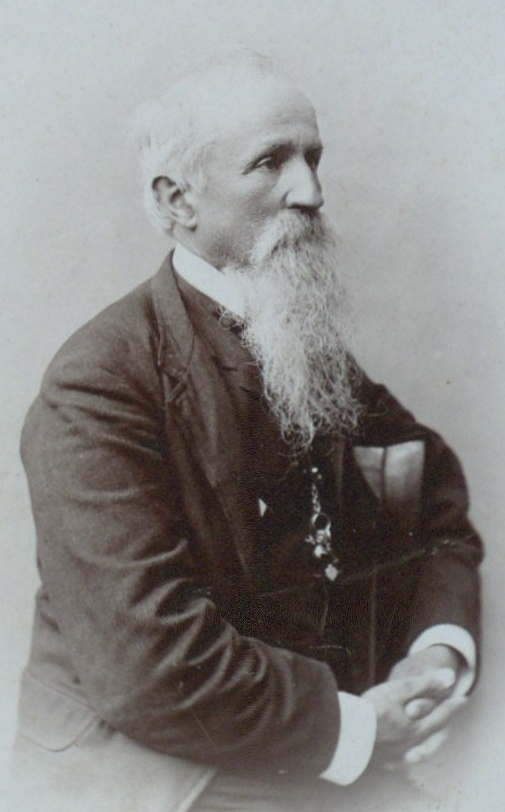
Portrait of Francesco Ardissone

== Biography ==
A student at the University of Genoa under Giuseppe De Notaris, a distinguished scholar of cryptogams, after graduating he became professor of natural history at the Guido Nolfi college in Fano. He was particularly interested in Phycology and was especially attracted to the study of the marine flora of Acireale. In 1870, he settled in Milan, where on April 17, 1871, he obtained the chair of Botany at the Royal Higher School of Agriculture, a university institute that offered a three-year degree in Agricultural Sciences, and the scientific and administrative direction of the adjoining Orto Botanico di Brera. In 1874, he began publishing Floridee Italiche. In 1877, Ardissone became president of the Italian Cryptogamological Society and began publishing the second series of Erbario crittogamico italiano and, in 1883, Phycologia mediterranea. These works were widely acclaimed and awarded prizes by the French Academy of Sciences.

On January 16, 1881, he became a member of the Academy of Sciences of Turin.

From 1897 to 1899, Ardissone was director of the Royal Higher School of Agriculture.

== Works ==
- Enumerazione delle alghe di Sicilia. F Ardissone, 1864
- Le Floridee Italiche descritte ed illustrate. F Ardissone, 1874
- Enumerazione Delle Alghe Di Liguria. F Ardissone, 1877
- Phycologia mediterranea. F Ardissone, 1883
