= 2011–12 Southampton F.C. season =

Southampton F.C.
2011–12 season
- Chairman: Nicola Cortese
- Manager: Nigel Adkins
- Stadium: St Mary's Stadium
- Championship: 2nd (promoted)
- FA Cup: Fourth round
- League Cup: Fourth round
- Top goalscorer: League: Rickie Lambert (27); All: Rickie Lambert (31)
- Highest home attendance: League: 32,363 v Coventry City (28 April 2012); Overall: 32,363 v Coventry City (28 April 2012)
- Lowest home attendance: League: 21,014 v Leicester City (24 January 2012); Overall: 6,541 v Torquay United (9 August 2011)
- Average home league attendance: League: 26,420; Overall: 24,786
Home colours	Away colours

The 2011–12 season was Southampton F.C.'s 72nd and seventh consecutive season in The Football League, and their first in the Championship since 2009. Having achieved promotion the previous season, the club were looking to retain their place in the second tier of English football and make progress towards their long-term aim of returning to the Premier League. The 2011–12 season was the first with new sponsor aap^{3}, a Southampton-based company providing "business and IT solutions".

Southampton began their pre-season preparations in July with a two-game tour of Switzerland, in a similar fashion to the 2010–11 season. Later in the month, the club held the first edition of the Markus Liebherr Memorial Cup, inviting European teams to compete in a tournament in honour of former owner Markus Liebherr. Additional friendlies followed before the league began on 6 August 2011.

Southampton were relatively active in the summer transfer window, purchasing three new players, selling three and releasing five: midfielder Jack Cork, winger Steve De Ridder and defender Danny Fox made the move to St Mary's for undisclosed fees, while midfielder Oscar Gobern and defender Joseph Mills departed the club, and winger Alex Oxlade-Chamberlain was sold to Arsenal for a club record £15 million in August. In the winter 2012 window, the Saints purchased strikers Tadanari Lee (the club's first Japanese player ever) and Billy Sharp, and made defender Jack Saville's loan move to Barnet final.

In April 2012, three Southampton players – goalkeeper Kelvin Davis, midfielder Adam Lallana, and striker Rickie Lambert – were named in the PFA Team of the Year for the Championship. After the last game of the season on 28 April 2012, Southampton achieved Premier League as the runners-up of the Championship, just one point behind champions Reading. Thus, they repeated the feat that Norwich City had done a year before, achieve back-to-back promotions.

== Pre-season ==
Southampton's first pre-season game was at Swiss club Biel-Bienne on 13 July. The visitors quickly built a two-goal advantage following a pair of David Connolly headers, but the home side drew level shortly after half-time and took the lead in the last ten minutes. The Saints managed to equalise a minute later though, with winger Alex Oxlade-Chamberlain scoring the final goal of the match to make the score 3–3. In the second match of their Swiss tour, Southampton lost 1–0 to St. Gallen, following a second half goal from Kristian Nushi.

On 23 July 2011, Southampton competed in the inaugural Markus Liebherr Memorial Cup, a friendly tournament established in honour of former club owner Markus Liebherr. The other participants in the Memorial Cup were Spanish club Athletic Bilbao and German club Werder Bremen. Described as a "unique triangular cup competition", each club played one another and points determined the winners of the tournament. Southampton won their first match conclusively, beating Bremen 3–0 with goals from David Connolly, Guly do Prado and Adam Lallana in the first half. Bilbao also beat Bremen, with a 2–1 scoreline, and managed to beat the host club in the deciding match by two goals, preventing the Saints from winning the first edition of the Memorial Cup.

Back in England, the Saints played their first full friendly of the season at St Mary's against Premier League club West Bromwich Albion. The game ended in a 2–2 draw, after a double from Albion striker Simon Cox was matched by goals from midfielder Jack Cork and striker Rickie Lambert in the second half. Southampton's final pre-season game of the season three days later ended in the same scoreline, with the Saints and Yeovil Town sharing four goals equally. David Connolly put the visitors 1–0 up just before half-time, but in the second period Yeovil equalised with a penalty from former Southampton player Paul Wotton. Saints striker Jonathan Forte scored an impressive solo goal later on, but this was again cancelled out by the home side thanks to a goal from Andy Williams.

13 July 2011 Tour of Switzerland	Biel-Bienne	3–3	Southampton	Biel/Bienne
17:30 BST	Mathys 25'; Safari 50', 81'	Report	Connolly 6', 17'; Oxlade-Chamberlain 82'	Stadium: Gurzelen Stadion

16 July 2011 Tour of Switzerland	St. Gallen	1–0	Southampton	St. Gallen
18:00 BST	Nushi 60'	Report		Stadium: AFG Arena; Attendance: 1,187; Referee: Pascal Erlacher (Switzerland)

23 July 2011 Markus Liebherr Memorial Cup	Southampton	3–0	Werder Bremen	Southampton
16:00 BST	Connolly 10' do Prado 30'; Lallana 40'	Report		Stadium: St Mary's Stadium

23 July 2011 Markus Liebherr Memorial Cup	Southampton	0–2	Athletic Bilbao	Southampton
19:00 BST		Report	Martínez 36'; Susaeta 45'	Stadium: St Mary's Stadium; Referee: Ron Groves

27 July 2011 Friendly	Southampton	2–2	West Bromwich Albion	Southampton
19:45 BST	Cork 71'; Lambert 84'	Report	Cox 60', 76'	Stadium: St Mary's Stadium; Attendance: 7,038; Referee: Keith Stroud (Hampshire)

30 July 2011 Friendly	Yeovil Town	2–2	Southampton	Yeovil
15:00 BST	Wotton 61' (pen.); Williams 70'	Report	Connolly 45'; Forte 66'	Stadium: Huish Park; Attendance: 2,018; Referee: Lee Collins

== Championship ==
=== August–September 2011 ===
In their first game of the season on 6 August 2011, Southampton beat Leeds United 3–1. The home side opened the scoring after ten minutes, with captain Dean Hammond scoring a solo goal; this lead was doubled just 15 minutes later by Adam Lallana, converting an assist from striker Rickie Lambert. Shortly after the break, David Connolly scored the Saints' third, but the clean sheet was denied in the very last minute of play when Max Gradel scored a penalty following a handball by defender Aaron Martin. Southampton made it two wins out of two a week later, as they beat Barnsley by a solitary goal in their first away game of the season. The visitors took the lead after half an hour, as David Connolly scored for the second game running after a defensive error by the hosts. The Saints were dominant for most of the rest of the game, but could only hold on with one goal for the win, which was slightly soured by the dismissal of midfielder Richard Chaplow, who had only been on the pitch for 15 minutes. Following the win, Southampton moved from second to first in the Championship league table. Southampton travelled to Portman Road later in the week, beating Ipswich Town 5–2. Rickie Lambert opened the scoring with two goals in the first 11 minutes of the match, and David Connolly made it three before the break. Ipswich returned after half time with two goals in quick succession, but the Saints were able to secure the win with two goals from Adam Lallana to return to the top of the table.

Back at St Mary's on 20 August, Southampton made it four wins out of four by beating Millwall 1–0. Winger Guilherme do Prado scored the only goal of the match in the 18th minute, and the team held on for the rest of the match despite second-half Millwall pressure to pick up another three points. This marks the first time in the club's history that Southampton have won all four of their opening league matches. The club's winning run finally came to an end on 27 August, when they lost 3–2 to Leicester City at the King Power Stadium. Leicester broke the deadlock after only three minutes with a goal from Darius Vassell, and quickly made it two with a Richie Wellens effort. Saints full back Dan Harding pulled one back for the visitors just before the half-hour mark, heading in an Adam Lallana cross, but on the stroke of half-time the hosts forced an own goal out of Rickie Lambert to retain their two-goal advantage going into the second half. David Connolly scored in the 53rd minute, but despite overall dominance in the second half Southampton were unable to turn the tables, thanks largely to a string of saves by Kasper Schmeichel in the last ten minutes.

After a two-week break, Southampton returned to winning ways by beating Nottingham Forest 3–2 at St Mary's in a closely contested match. Matt Derbyshire opened the scoring for Forest in the seventh minute, but Southampton striker Rickie Lambert cancelled out the goal just a minute later. Lambert scored a second for the Saints when he headed in a David Connolly assist on 24 minutes, but the visitors levelled the scoreline just before the break. After periods of domination for both sides, Southampton finally scored a winner in the 82nd minute when Lambert completed his hat-trick from a Danny Fox free kick. The following week Southampton hosted former Premier League side Birmingham City, winning the match by an assertive scoreline of 4–1. The first goal of the match came in the eleventh minute from top scorer Rickie Lambert, who converted a penalty kick given when he was fouled in the box. The tally was quickly doubled, as Guly do Prado converted a Frazer Richardson cross into a second, and a third was scored by Adam Lallana ten minutes before half-time to make it 3–0 at the break. Birmingham got a goal back early in the second half, but substitute Richard Chaplow sealed the win in the 78th minute with Southampton's fourth.

Southampton's brilliant form (six wins and one loss) began to crumble when the team visited Turf Moor to face Burnley on 24 September, though. The first half of the match was largely balanced as both sides failed to break the deadlock and went into the break goalless. Burnley piled on the pressure after the break, and finally scored the first goal of the game in the 53rd minute courtesy of Charlie Austin. With Southampton constantly looking for an equaliser, the home side remained vigilant in defence and kept the league-toppers out until ten minutes before time, when substitute Morgan Schneiderlin scored his first goal of the season, finishing Danny Fox's assist to give the Saints a point and keep them at the top of the Championship table. Southampton's luck only grew worse in midweek, however, when a visit to Cardiff City resulted in only their second loss of the campaign so far. The first half was largely a success for the visitors, as Southampton made a number of breaks but could not finish off their attacking moves. It was the hosts who came out stronger in the second period though, as Kenny Miller headed in a long ball to open the scoring for the Bluebirds. Steve De Ridder was brought on, but it wasn't enough as Miller doubled his tally just seven minutes later when he calmly slot the ball past Kelvin Davis. The Saints battled on, but all they could achieve was a consolation goal in injury time courtesy of a neat finish from substitute De Ridder; Southampton remained top of the league however, due to draws at Middlesbrough and Derby County.

=== October–November 2011 ===
On 1 October, Southampton returned to winning ways and extended their lead at the top of the Championship to two points by beating Watford 4–0. The Saints opened the scoring when winger Steve De Ridder was brought down in the box and Rickie Lambert converted the penalty in the 22nd minute. Southampton cruised to half-time, and were awarded a second penalty ten minutes after the break, which Lambert again scored to put the hosts two up. A passage of play between Adam Lallana and Guly do Prado saw the Brazilian score his third of the season on 70 minutes, before substitute Lee Holmes – in his first appearance of the season and just two minutes after coming on – latched onto Morgan Schneiderlin's long ball to make it four. On 15 October Southampton visited Derby County, drawing 1–1 at Pride Park Stadium. Derby opened the scoring in the first half courtesy of a Theo Robinson strike, and held the lead until midway into the second half. Rickie Lambert scored his ninth league goal of the season after 61 minutes, after an assist from David Connolly. The game ended as a draw, with Southampton remaining at the top of the table. Southampton extended their lead at the top to five points when they faced second-place West Ham United in midweek, winning by a single goal to nil. Saints loanee defender Jos Hooiveld scored the only goal of the match on the cusp of half-time, heading in a corner from left back Danny Fox. The match was marked by a relatively high amount of disciplinary action, with both sides picking up three cautions each.

Southampton's lead dropped to three points on 22 October, when they drew 1–1 with Reading. The Saints played at a largely mediocre level, with goalkeeper Kelvin Davis keeping the hosts from scoring on many occasions in the first half. Reading finally made the break in the 71st minute when Antiguan midfielder Mikele Leigertwood scored from inside the penalty area to put pressure on Southampton. The pressure was increased a few minutes later, when captain Dean Hammond was sent off for a second bookable offence, but winger Steve De Ridder made sure Saints got a point ten minutes from time when he completed a Guly do Prado setup. On 29 October, Southampton picked up their 18th consecutive home win, against third-placed Middlesbrough, winning the match 3–0. Guly do Prado opened the scoring after 15 minutes, heading in an assist from full-back Danny Butterfield who was making his first league appearance of the season. Guly doubled his and the team's tally under 15 minutes later, scoring another header this time from a Rickie Lambert setup. The Saints had to wait until ten minutes from time to secure the win, when substitute David Connolly finished off a long team move to put the club three points ahead at the top of the table.

On 1 November the Saints extended their lead at the top to five points against fellow promotees Peterborough United. The team won 2–1 at home, with both goals coming within the first 20 minutes of the match: midfielder Richard Chaplow scored his second of the season in the 14th minute from a Guly do Prado setup, and defender Jos Hooiveld also scored his second courtesy of do Prado just three minutes later. Peterborough went down to ten men in the first half when Lee Frecklington fouled Morgan Schneiderlin and was sent off in the 35th minute, and Southampton held on despite a Peterborough consolation in the 76th minute, while second-placed West Ham drew to increase the gap between themselves and the lead. Southampton remained at the top of the Championship when they beat Coventry City 4–2 on 5 November. The Saints went two goals up in the first half, courtesy of strikes from Richard Chaplow and Adam Lallana, before the home side equalised in the second half. Guly do Prado and Steve De Ridder scored a second brace of goals for the visitors, giving Southampton their third league win in a row.

After a two-week break, Southampton upheld their 100% home win record with a 3–0 win over Brighton & Hove Albion. All three goals came within 20 minutes of each other in the second-half, all courtesy of Rickie Lambert. In the 49th minute Lambert headed in a Frazer Richardson cross; in the 58th minute he scored a penalty, after Mauricio Taricco was sent off; and in the 69th minute he scored a second penalty following a booking for Iñigo Calderón. The Saints picked up their first loss in two months the following week, when they lost at Bristol City due to second half goals from Albert Adomah and Nicky Maynard. Later in the week Southampton hosted Hull City, and after going a goal down at the end of the first period were able to claw back the three points in the second half. Guly do Prado scored the first shortly after the break, converting a Rickie Lambert setup, and Adam Lallana headed in a Frazer Richardson cross just a few minutes later to win the match. The game was made slightly easier to ride out later in the match as Hull went down to ten men with the dismissal of winger Robbie Brady.

=== December 2011 ===
December didn't start off well for the Saints, as they lost their fourth game of the season against bottom-placed Doncaster Rovers by a solitary goal. A largely equal encounter, Southampton conceded the only goal of the match in the 60th minute, when striker Billy Sharp scored from a lay-off courtesy of fellow striker Marc-Antoine Fortuné. Misfortune continued for the Hampshire club when they hosted Premier League relegation victims Blackpool the following week. The home side struck first, when striker Rickie Lambert converted a Jack Cork assist from the edge of the penalty area in the 30th minute, but the lead was short-lived as Chris Basham scored just six minutes later. The teams went into half time level, and Blackpool broke the deadlock shortly after the break courtesy of a long-range effort from Callum McManaman. The game looked lost for Southampton but a period of high pressure from the hosts culminated in a winning goal from a Lambert header in the third of five minutes of injury time.

On 18 December the Saints travelled to Fratton Park for the first of two matches against local rivals Portsmouth in the South Coast derby. Southampton went into the match top of the table still, but only on goal difference due to a positive result for second-placed West Ham United the previous day. After a relatively tame and equal first half, in which Southampton arguably came closest to scoring through Guly do Prado and Rickie Lambert chances, Lambert opened the scoring shortly after the hour mark with a header from a Frazer Richardson cross. Later into the game, Portsmouth increased their pressure on the Championship leaders and it eventually culminated in an equalising goal for Joel Ward, who headed in a scrappy chance to take the game to a draw. Southampton continued their unbeaten home run when they beat Crystal Palace 2–0 at St Mary's on Boxing Day. Both goals came courtesy of midfielder Guly do Prado, who headed in a Steve De Ridder cross in the 33rd minute and a Frazer Richardson assist in the 76th. Southampton's 23-game unbeaten home run ended on 30 December, the final game of the year, when they lost 1–0 to Bristol City, thanks to a second-half goal from loanee midfielder Stephen Pearson. Due to the results of Middlesbrough and West Ham United, Southampton remained top of the table by two points going into 2012.

=== January–February 2012 ===
Southampton's first game of 2012 was a disaster: the side lost 3–0 to Brighton & Hove Albion – their worst result of the season, and the inverse of the season's first meeting of the teams – and striker Rickie Lambert was sent off for violent conduct. Tensions were high in the first half, when defender Dan Harding was taken off by Nigel Adkins for fear of him getting sent off; but going into half-time the match was goalless. Early in the second half, referee Andy D'Urso showed Rickie Lambert a red card after violent conduct between the striker and Brighton defender Adam El-Abd. With ten men, Southampton conceded three goals in the remaining match time, one from youngster Jake Forster-Caskey and two from midfielder Matt Sparrow. In the last five minutes, Brighton also lost a player when captain Gordon Greer was dismissed for a foul on striker Jonathan Forte, but Southampton were unable to change the result. The Saints bounced back in their next game, winning 3–0 away against Nottingham Forest. Guly do Prado kicked off the scoring in the 27th minute, and made it two courtesy of David Connolly in the second half after Forest went down to ten men shortly after the break. Morgan Schneiderlin finished off the game with a long-range effort to secure Southampton's place at the top of the table. Southampton dropped to second in the table for the first time since September when they lost 2–0 to Leicester City on 23 January. Both goals were scored early in the first half, in the 15th minute by David Nugent and in the 26th minute by captain Matt Mills, and due to West Ham United's win over Nottingham Forest the Saints dropped to second place in the Championship table.

Against Cardiff City the Saints began to gain points again, drawing at home 1–1. After being down a goal at half-time, Rickie Lambert scored from the penalty spot just before the hour mark to give Southampton a much-needed point. On 4 February, the team travelled to face Birmingham City, with the match ending in a goalless draw. The game was marked by a red card for full back Danny Fox, who was dismissed in the second half due to persistent fouling. Southampton won their first game in almost a month the following week, when they beat Burnley 2–0. Adam Lallana broke the deadlock in the eighth minute with a close-range header set up by Frazer Richardson, and new signing Billy Sharp scored on his first start for the club 25 minutes later, latching onto a Lambert pass to double the home side's lead. Due to a postponement in the West Ham game, the result meant Southampton closed the gap at the top to just one point. In a top-of-the-table match against West Ham on 14 February, Southampton scored late to secure a point and remain one behind the league leaders. Controversy began early when Saints striker Billy Sharp gave away a penalty, receiving a booking in the process, and became involved in an altercation with West Ham midfielder Matthew Taylor, who was sent off for the incident. Mark Noble scored the spot kick, putting the hosts a goal up after just 20 minutes. More cautions for both sides followed in the first and second halves, and after much pressure Southampton finally scored courtesy of a Jos Hooiveld effort in the 75th minute to leave them at the same disadvantage in the table as before the match.

Southampton returned to winning ways later in the week, thrashing Derby County 4–0. A close range goal from Jos Hooiveld gave the Saints a one-goal lead at half time, and in the second half the home side added a further three goals courtesy of defender Aaron Martin, winger Adam Lallana and Japanese striker Tadanari Lee, sending the club back to the top of the table. Travelling away the following week, the Saints kept their second clean sheet in a row by beating Watford 3–0. All three goals came from striker Rickie Lambert, who put the Saints up by two goals within 21 minutes and scored a penalty in the 72nd minute to extend Southampton's unbeaten run to six matches.

=== March–April 2012 ===
It was Lambert who again won three points for Southampton in the club's first match in March, when the team travelled to Elland Road to face Leeds United. The goal came after just quarter of an hour, when the season's top scorer volleyed in a Jack Cork cross, extending Southampton's lead at the top of the table to four points. The next match against Ipswich Town dealt Southampton's Championship-winning hopes a slight blow, as the match ended a three-win streak with a 1–1 draw at St Mary's. After a match largely dominated by Southampton, Rickie Lambert opened the scoring in the 74th minute before Jason Scotland equalised just before full-time to leave the match in a deadlock. The Saints faced Barnley later in the week, winning 2–0 thanks to two goals from Adam Lallana. The following week, the Saints faced Millwall at The Den in a match decided in the last five minutes. Rickie Lambert scored in the 16th minute, before a José Fonte own goal equalised the match for Millwall. A second goal for the home side put the Saints behind before half time, and it took until the 85th minute for Southampton to equalise with a penalty from Lambert; Lambert completed his hat trick in the 88th minute, extending Southampton's unbeaten run to ten games and retaining their place at the top of the Championship table.

On 20 March Southampton won their third game in a row when they visited Hull City, despite Hull enjoying the best periods of the game. The opening goal came in the 14th minute, when Hull defender and captain Jack Hobbs turned an Adam Lallana cross into his own goal. Hull held off until the second half, when defender Jos Hooiveld finished off a Frazer Richardson assist to make it 2–0 to the Saints. The winning run continued later in the week, when Southampton hosted Doncaster Rovers and picked up another 2–0 win. The home side dominated most of the match, but it took until the second half for the deadlock to be broken; both goals were scored by former Doncaster striker Billy Sharp, who turned in a Danny Fox corner in the 58th minute and later scored a close-range goal in the 75th minute to keep the Saints at the top of the table. Southampton lost their first game in over two months on the last day of March, as Blackpool hosted the Championship leaders and won 3–0. Billy Sharp had a penalty saved before two goals were scored in the first half, both by Stephen Dobbie and one of which was a penalty for a foul by Morgan Schneiderlin, and the third came just after the break when Ian Evatt headed in a corner to secure the win for Blackpool.

In their first match of April, Southampton hosted relegation potentials Portsmouth in the second South Coast derby of the season. The match was appropriately competitive given the occasion, and was opened by Saints striker Billy Sharp after 27 minutes who scored from close range. Portsmouth levelled less than ten minutes later, when Chris Maguire scored from the edge of the penalty area, leaving the score at 1–1 going into the break. The second half offered few opportunities to either side, and it took until the final minute of normal time for the deadlock to finally be broken, when Sharp scored his second of the match to put the Saints ahead, despite strong calls from Portsmouth for offside. Despite this apparent winner, the controversy continued when midfielder David Norris scored a second equaliser for the visitors, ending the match 2–2. Despite the result, Southampton remained top of the table ahead of Reading on goal difference. Two days later the Saints travelled to face Crystal Palace, and secured their place at the top of the table with another win. Both goals came courtesy of top scorer Rickie Lambert, one a headed effort from a Danny Butterfield cross before half time and the second a mid-range low strike in the second period.

On 13 April Southampton hosted second-placed Reading, in a match deemed to be extremely important to the potential final make-up of the Championship table; with St Mary's almost sold out, Southampton dropped crucial points in the title race by losing to their closest rivals 3–1 as Reading all but secured their own promotion. Reading opened the scoring after 19 minutes with a Jason Roberts header, and it took until early in the second half for Rickie Lambert to score the Saints' equaliser. The match remained in a deadlock for almost half an hour, only for the visitors to take the victory with two late goals, both coming from striker Adam Le Fondre, putting Reading three points ahead at the top of the table. Southampton bounced back later in the week, beating Peterborough United by the same scoreline. Southampton took an early lead with a goal from Jos Hooiveld after just five minutes, and a mere five minutes later the scoreline was doubled when Billy Sharp also converted. Sharp then scored his second of the game in the second half, converting an Adam Lallana setup to make it 3–0 to the Saints, although Peterborough did manage a consolation goal in the final five minutes of the match.

Southampton missed their final chance to win the Championship in their penultimate game of the season, when their trip to Middlesbrough ended in a 2–1 defeat; Reading drew their game, making it impossible for Southampton to catch up and crowning them the champions of the league. Southampton started off the game perfectly, when Billy Sharp scored after just 40 seconds to put the visitors up by a goal early on. Unfortunately the title hopes of Southampton were dented late in the match: Nicky Bailey equalised at the very end of the first half, before Merouane Zemmama scored a winner to keep Middlesbrough's play-off hopes alive. The club was promoted to the Premier League for the first time in seven years on the final day of the Championship season when they beat Coventry City (who had already been relegated) 4–0. The Saints opened the scoring just after the quarter-hour mark, as striker Billy Sharp touched in Adam Lallana's volley, and the lead was doubled just three minutes later when defender José Fonte headed in his only goal of the season from another Lallana setup. In the second half, defender Jos Hooiveld made it three for the home side with a close range effort, before Adam Lallana finally sealed the victory with a goal of his own just four minutes later. Southampton were thus promoted as runners-up of the Championship, one point behind Reading (who lost their last game of the season) and two points ahead of West Ham United (who won their last two games of the season).

=== Results and statistics ===
6 August 2011 1	Southampton	3–1	Leeds United	Southampton
17:20 BST	Hammond 10'; Lallana 25'; Connolly 52'	Report	Gradel 90+5' (pen.)	Stadium: St Mary's Stadium; Attendance: 25,860; Referee: Kevin Wright

13 August 2011 2	Barnsley	0–1	Southampton	Barnsley
15:00 BST		Report	Connolly 30'	Stadium: Oakwell; Attendance: 10,501; Referee: Colin Webster

16 August 2011 3	Ipswich Town	2–5	Southampton	Ipswich
19:45 BST	Andrews 56'; Emmanuel-Thomas 62'	Report	Lambert 4', 11'; Connolly 42'; Lallana 76', 90+2'	Stadium: Portman Road; Attendance: 18,553; Referee: Jon Moss

20 August 2011 4	Southampton	1–0	Millwall	Southampton
15:00 BST	do Prado 18'	Report		Stadium: St Mary's Stadium; Attendance: 23,333; Referee: Andy D'Urso

27 August 2011 5	Leicester City	3–2	Southampton	Leicester
15:00 BST	Vassell 3'; Wellens 22'; Lambert 45+3' (o.g.)	Report	Harding 28'; Connolly 53'	Stadium: King Power Stadium; Attendance: 23,808; Referee: Scott Mathieson

10 September 2011 6	Southampton	3–2	Nottingham Forest	Southampton
15:00 BST	Lambert 8', 25', 82'	Report	Derbyshire 7'; Majewski 42'	Stadium: St Mary's Stadium; Attendance: 24,784; Referee: Iain Williamson

18 September 2011 7	Southampton	4–1	Birmingham City	Southampton
15:00 BST	Lambert 11' (pen.) do Prado 21'; Lallana 34'; Chaplow 78'	Report	Wood 49'	Stadium: St Mary's Stadium; Attendance: 22,155; Referee: Dean Whitestone

24 September 2011 8	Burnley	1–1	Southampton	Burnley
15:00 BST	Austin 53'	Report	Schneiderlin 80'	Stadium: Turf Moor; Attendance: 14,170; Referee: Anthony Taylor

27 September 2011 9	Cardiff City	2–1	Southampton	Cardiff
19:45 BST	Miller 56', 63'	Report	De Ridder 90+3'	Stadium: Cardiff City Stadium; Attendance: 22,502; Referee: Philip Gibbs

1 October 2011 10	Southampton	4–0	Watford	Southampton
15:00 BST	Lambert 22' (pen.), 55' (pen.) do Prado 70'; Holmes 88'	Report		Stadium: St Mary's Stadium; Attendance: 23,574; Referee: Carl Boyeson

15 October 2011 11	Derby County	1–1	Southampton	Derby
15:00 BST	Robinson 3'	Report	Lambert 61'	Stadium: Pride Park Stadium; Attendance: 33,010; Referee: Mark Brown

18 October 2011 12	Southampton	1–0	West Ham United	Southampton
19:45 BST	Hooiveld 45'	Report		Stadium: St Mary's Stadium; Attendance: 32,152; Referee: Darren Deadman

22 October 2011 13	Reading	1–1	Southampton	Reading
17:20 BST	Leigertwood 71'	Report	De Ridder 80'	Stadium: Madejski Stadium; Attendance: 21,889; Referee: Jon Moss

29 October 2011 14	Southampton	3–0	Middlesbrough	Southampton
15:00 BST	do Prado 15', 29'; Connolly 80'	Report		Stadium: St Mary's Stadium; Attendance: 26,630; Referee: Roger East

1 November 2011 15	Southampton	2–1	Peterborough United	Southampton
19:45 GMT	Chaplow 14'; Hooiveld 17'	Report	Sinclair 76'	Stadium: St Mary's Stadium; Attendance: 21,350; Referee: Gavin Ward

5 November 2011 16	Coventry City	2–4	Southampton	Coventry
15:00 GMT	Jutkiewicz 47'; Platt 70'	Report	Chaplow 34'; Lallana 39' do Prado 77'; De Ridder 85'	Stadium: Ricoh Arena; Attendance: 15,621; Referee: Michael Naylor

19 November 2011 17	Southampton	3–0	Brighton & Hove Albion	Southampton
15:00 GMT	Lambert 49', 58' (pen.), 69' (pen.)	Report		Stadium: St Mary's Stadium; Attendance: 31,812; Referee: Peter Walton

26 November 2011 18	Bristol City	2–0	Southampton	Bristol
15:00 GMT	Adomah 48'; Maynard 84'	Report		Stadium: Ashton Gate Stadium; Attendance: 16,346; Referee: Chris Sarginson

29 November 2011 19	Southampton	2–1	Hull City	Southampton
19:45 GMT	do Prado 47'; Lallana 55'	Report	Koren 43'	Stadium: St Mary's Stadium; Attendance: 22,983; Referee: Oliver Langford

3 December 2011 20	Doncaster Rovers	1–0	Southampton	Doncaster
15:00 GMT	Sharp 60'	Report		Stadium: Keepmoat Stadium; Attendance: 9,527; Referee: Geoff Eltringham

10 December 2011 21	Southampton	2–2	Blackpool	Southampton
12:45 GMT	Lambert 30', 90+3'	Report	Basham 36'; McManaman 49'	Stadium: St Mary's Stadium; Attendance: 22,776; Referee: Geoff Eltringham

18 December 2011 22	Portsmouth	1–1	Southampton	Portsmouth
13:00 GMT	Ward 84'	Report	Lambert 63'	Stadium: Fratton Park; Attendance: 19,879; Referee: Mark Halsey

26 December 2011 23	Southampton	2–0	Crystal Palace	Southampton
13:00 GMT	do Prado 34', 77'	Report		Stadium: St Mary's Stadium; Attendance: 31,524; Referee: Graham Salisbury

30 December 2011 24	Southampton	0–1	Bristol City	Southampton
19:45 GMT		Report	Pearson 78'	Stadium: St Mary's Stadium; Attendance: 30,328; Referee: Darren Deadman

2 January 2012 25	Brighton & Hove Albion	3–0	Southampton	Brighton
15:00 GMT	Forster-Caskey 66'; Sparrow 76', 86'	Report		Stadium: Falmer Stadium; Attendance: 20,773; Referee: Andy D'Urso

14 January 2012 26	Nottingham Forest	0–3	Southampton	Nottingham
15:00 GMT		Details	do Prado 27'; Connolly 65'; Schneiderlin 79'	Stadium: City Ground; Attendance: 20,221; Referee: Eddie Ilderton

23 January 2012 27	Southampton	0–2	Leicester City	Southampton
19:45 GMT		Report	Nugent 16'; Mills 26'	Stadium: St Mary's Stadium; Attendance: 21,014; Referee: Neil Swarbrick

31 January 2012 28	Southampton	1–1	Cardiff City	Southampton
19:45 GMT	Lambert 57' (pen.)	Report	Conway 36'	Stadium: St Mary's Stadium; Attendance: 24,356; Referee: Mark Haywood

4 February 2012 29	Birmingham City	0–0	Southampton	Birmingham
17:20 GMT		Report		Stadium: St Andrew's; Attendance: 17,904; Referee: Phil Dowd

11 February 2012 30	Southampton	2–0	Burnley	Southampton
15:00 GMT	Lallana 8'; Sharp 33'	Report		Stadium: St Mary's Stadium; Attendance: 24,099; Referee: Trevor Kettle

14 February 2012 31	West Ham United	1–1	Southampton	London
19:45 GMT	Noble 21' (pen.)	Report	Hooiveld 75'	Stadium: Boleyn Ground; Attendance: 32,875; Referee: Lee Probert

18 February 2012 32	Southampton	4–0	Derby County	Southampton
15:00 GMT	Hooiveld 15'; Martin 57'; Lallana 65'; Lee 75'	Report		Stadium: St Mary's Stadium; Attendance: 24,536; Referee: Graham Scott

25 February 2012 33	Watford	0–3	Southampton	Watford
15:00 GMT		Report	Lambert 13', 21', 72' (pen.)	Stadium: Vicarage Road; Attendance: 13,424; Referee: Tony Bates

3 March 2012 34	Leeds United	0–1	Southampton	Leeds
17:20 GMT		Report	Lambert 16'	Stadium: Elland Road; Attendance: 20,901; Referee: Nigel Miller

6 March 2012 35	Southampton	1–1	Ipswich Town	Southampton
19:45 GMT	Lambert 74'	Report	Scotland 85'	Stadium: St Mary's Stadium; Attendance: 23,315; Referee: Darren Drysdale

10 March 2012 36	Southampton	2–0	Barnsley	Southampton
15:00 GMT	Lallana 36', 54'	Report		Stadium: St Mary's Stadium; Attendance: 24,862; Referee: David Phillips

17 March 2012 37	Millwall	2–3	Southampton	Bermondsey
15:00 GMT	Fonte 23' (o.g.); Robinson 28'	Report	Lambert 16', 85' (pen.), 88' (pen.)	Stadium: The Den; Attendance: 12,144; Referee: Fred Graham

20 March 2012 38	Hull City	0–2	Southampton	Hull
19:45 GMT		Report	Hobbs 14' (o.g.); Hooiveld 59'	Stadium: KC Stadium; Attendance: 18,066; Referee: David Webb

24 March 2012 39	Southampton	2–0	Doncaster Rovers	Southampton
15:00 GMT	Sharp 58', 75'	Report		Stadium: St Mary's Stadium; Attendance: 30,209; Referee: Danny McDermid

31 March 2012 40	Blackpool	3–0	Southampton	Blackpool
17:45 BST	Dobbie 22' (pen.), 31'; Evatt 52'	Report		Stadium: Bloomfield Road; Attendance: 13,499; Referee: Dean Whitestone

7 April 2012 41	Southampton	2–2	Portsmouth	Southampton
13:00 BST	Sharp 27', 89'	Report	Maguire 36'; Norris 90+4'	Stadium: St Mary's Stadium; Attendance: 31,743; Referee: Neil Swarbrick

9 April 2012 42	Crystal Palace	0–2	Southampton	London
15:00 BST		Report	Lambert 39', 56'	Stadium: Selhurst Park; Attendance: 18,753; Referee: Gary Sutton

13 April 2012 43	Southampton	1–3	Reading	Southampton
19:45 BST	Lambert 48'	Report	Roberts 19'; Le Fondre 72', 90'	Stadium: St Mary's Stadium; Attendance: 31,892; Referee: Mike Dean

17 April 2012 44	Peterborough United	1–3	Southampton	Peterborough
19:45 BST	Rowe 86'	Report	Hooiveld 5'; Sharp 10', 57'	Stadium: London Road Stadium; Attendance: 9,478; Referee: Jock Waugh

21 April 2012 45	Middlesbrough	2–1	Southampton	Middlesbrough
17:20 BST	Bailey 45+2'; Zemmama 77'	Report	Sharp 1'	Stadium: Riverside Stadium; Attendance: 19,002; Referee: Tony Bates

28 April 2012 46	Southampton	4–0	Coventry City	Southampton
12:30 BST	Sharp 16'; Fonte 19'; Hooiveld 59'; Lallana 63'	Report		Stadium: St Mary's Stadium; Attendance: 32,363; Referee: Anthony Taylor

Round	1	2	3	4	5	6	7	8	9	10	11	12	13	14	15	16	17	18	19	20	21	22	23	24	25	26	27	28	29	30	31	32	33	34	35	36	37	38	39	40	41	42	43	44	45	46
Ground	H	A	A	H	A	H	H	A	A	H	A	H	A	H	H	A	H	A	H	A	H	A	H	H	A	A	H	H	A	H	A	H	A	A	H	H	A	A	H	A	H	A	H	A	A	H
Result	W	W	W	W	L	W	W	D	L	W	D	W	D	W	W	W	W	L	W	L	D	D	W	L	L	W	L	D	D	W	D	W	W	W	D	W	W	W	W	L	D	W	L	W	L	W
Position	2	1	1	1	2	2	1	1	1	1	1	1	1	1	1	1	1	1	1	1	1	1	1	1	1	1	2	2	2	2	2	1	1	1	1	1	1	1	1	1	1	1	2	2	2	2

Updated to match(es) played on 28 April 2012. Source: Southampton F.C.
A = Away; H = Home; W = Win; D = Draw; L = Loss

Pos	Club	Pld	W	D	L	GF	GA	GD	Pts
1	Reading	46	27	8	11	69	41	+28	89
2	Southampton	46	26	10	10	85	46	+39	88
3	West Ham United	46	24	14	8	81	48	+33	86

Pld = Matches played; W = Matches won; D = Matches drawn; L = Matches lost; GF = Goals for; GA = Goals against; GD = Goal difference; Pts = Points

== FA Cup ==
Southampton played their first match of the 2011–12 FA Cup on 7 January 2012 against Coventry City, winning 2–1. The match started poorly for the Saints, as winger Gary McSheffrey scored for the home side in the fifth minute. The match was relatively uneventful until Southampton equalised in the 64th minute, when midfielder James Ward-Prowse scored his first goal for the club. Defender Aaron Martin also scored his first goal for the club, winning the match for the visiting team in the last ten minutes.

In the fourth round, Southampton faced Millwall on 28 January 2012. The match ended in a 1–1 draw, meaning a replay will be scheduled. Millwall dominated the majority of the match, but Southampton led for most of it after Rickie Lambert scored from a Dan Harding setup in the 31st minute. Millwall drew level just before the final whistle courtesy of Darius Henderson. In the replay ten days later at St Mary's, Millwall knocked Southampton out of the tournament with a dramatic injury time winner courtesy of Liam Feeney. The visitors went one up within 20 minutes, but Adam Lallana quickly equalised 15 minutes later with a close-range effort. It took until late in the second half for the next goal to come, with the hosts switching play with a 77th-minute strike from Rickie Lambert, although the lead was short-lived as former Saints loanee winger Dany N'Guessan equalled again for Millwall. Feeney's long-range effort ensured that the game did not go to extra time or penalties, progressing Millwall into the fifth round and knocking the Saints out of the FA Cup for another year.

7 January 2012 Round 3	Coventry City	1–2	Southampton	Coventry
15:00 GMT	McSheffrey 5'	Report	Ward-Prowse 64'; Martin 82'	Stadium: Ricoh Arena; Attendance: 9,000; Referee: Colin Webster

28 January 2012 Round 4	Millwall	1–1	Southampton	London
15:00 GMT	Henderson 86'	Report	Lambert 31'	Stadium: The Den; Attendance: 8,278; Referee: Roger East

7 February 2012 Round 4 replay	Southampton	2–3	Millwall	Southampton
19:45 GMT	Lallana 35'; Lambert 77'	Report	Trotter 17'; N'Guessan 79'; Feeney 90+2'	Stadium: St Mary's Stadium; Attendance: 8,493; Referee: Dean Whitestone

== League Cup ==
Southampton won their first-round match against Torquay United 4–1 on 9 August, advancing to the second round of the League Cup. The Saints started the game well, with new signing Steve De Ridder scoring on his full debut for the club in the 16th minute, but this was cancelled out less than a minute later by Torquay midfielder Lee Mansell. Rickie Lambert scored Southampton's second ten minutes later, putting the hosts ahead going into half time. Southampton eventually sealed the win, but it took until the 81st minute for Richard Chaplow to score the third goal and injury time for Jonathan Forte to confirm the win with the Saints' fourth of the match.

In the second round, Southampton beat Swindon Town 3–1 at the County Ground on 30 August. Guly do Prado opened the scoring after 17 minutes, before Jonathan Forte scored his second in the competition to double the scoreline. Mehdi Kerrouche pulled one back for the home side late in the game, but substitute Rickie Lambert made sure that the Saints were to progress to the next round with a last minute winner.

Southampton hosted Preston North End in the third round, winning the match 2–1 with goals from Jos Hooiveld and substitute Adam Lallana. In the fourth round Southampton lost to Crystal Palace 2–0, with goals coming late in the second half from Darren Ambrose and a Jermaine Easter penalty.

9 August 2011 Round 1	Southampton	4–1	Torquay United	Southampton
19:45 BST	De Ridder 16'; Lambert 27'; Chaplow 81'; Forte 90+3'	Report	Mansell 17'	Stadium: St Mary's Stadium; Attendance: 6,541; Referee: Dave Phillips

30 August 2011 Round 2	Swindon Town	1–3	Southampton	Swindon
19:45 BST	Kerrouche 83'	Report	do Prado 17'; Forte 30'; Lambert 90+4'	Stadium: County Ground; Attendance: 7,452; Referee: Fred Graham

21 September 2011 Round 3	Southampton	2–1	Preston North End	Southampton
19:45 BST	Hooiveld 27'; Lallana 66'	Report	Barton 52'	Stadium: St Mary's Stadium; Attendance: 7,414; Referee: Simon Hooper

25 September 2011 Round 4	Crystal Palace	2–0	Southampton	London
19:45 BST	Ambrose 73'; Easter 82' (pen.)	Report		Stadium: Selhurst Park; Attendance: 11,865; Referee: Mark Haywood

== Squad statistics ==
As of 28 April 2012

No.	Pos.	Nat.	Name	League			FA Cup			League Cup			Total			Discipline	
No.	Pos.	Nat.	Name	Apps.	Goals	Assists	Apps.	Goals	Assists	Apps.	Goals	Assists	Apps.	Goals	Assists	Yellow card	Red card
1	GK	(England)	Kelvin Davis	45	0	0	0	0	0	0	0	0	45	0	0	1	0
2	DF	(England)	Frazer Richardson	33(1)	0	10	2	0	1	1	0	1	36(1)	0	12	2	0
4	MF	(France)	Morgan Schneiderlin	29(12)	2	3	1	0	0	4	0	1	34(12)	2	4	7	0
6	DF	(Portugal)	José Fonte	42	1	2	1	0	0	0(1)	0	0	43(1)	1	2	6	0
7	FW	(England)	Rickie Lambert	42	27	13	1(1)	2	0	1(3)	2	0	44(4)	31	13	2	1
8	MF	(England)	Jack Cork	39(7)	0	3	1	0	0	2	0	0	42(7)	0	3	5	0
9	FW	(England)	Lee Barnard	0(6)	0	0	1(1)	0	0	0(1)	0	0	1(8)	0	0	0	0
10	MF	(Brazil)	Guilherme do Prado	36(6)	10	6	1	0	0	2(1)	1	1	39(7)	11	7	4	0
11	FW	(England)	Billy Sharp	11(4)	9	2	0	0	0	0	0	0	11(4)	9	2	3	0
12	DF	(England)	Danny Butterfield	9(1)	0	3	0	0	0	3	0	0	12(1)	0	3	0	0
13	DF	(Scotland)	Danny Fox	36(5)	0	11	2	0	2	0	0	0	38(5)	0	13	4	1
14	MF	(England)	Dean Hammond	31(12)	1	1	3	0	0	0(2)	0	0	34(14)	1	1	2	1
15	DF	(Tunisia)	Radhi Jaïdi	0	0	0	0	0	0	0	0	0	0	0	0	0	0
16	DF	(England)	Aaron Martin	7(3)	1	0	3	1	0	4	0	0	14(3)	2	0	1	0
17	FW	(Barbados)	Jonathan Forte	0(1)	0	0	0	0	0	3(1)	2	0	3(2)	2	0	0	0
18	MF	(England)	Richard Chaplow	17(8)	3	1	1	0	0	2	1	2	20(8)	4	3	2	1
19	FW	(Japan)	Tadanari Lee	4(3)	1	2	1(1)	0	0	0	0	0	5(4)	1	2	0	0
20	MF	(England)	Adam Lallana	41	11	9	2	1	0	1(2)	1	1	44(2)	13	10	1	0
21	GK	(Poland)	Bartosz Białkowski	1	0	0	3	0	0	4	0	0	8	0	0	1	0
22	FW	(Republic of Ireland)	David Connolly	17(9)	6	4	0	0	0	0	0	0	17(9)	6	4	1	0
23	DF	(England)	Ryan Dickson	0	0	0	0	0	0	2	0	0	2	0	0	0	0
24	MF	(England)	Lee Holmes	0(4)	1	0	0(1)	0	0	4	0	2	4(5)	1	2	0	0
25	DF	(England)	Danny Seaborne	3	0	0	0	0	0	2	0	0	5	0	0	1	0
26	DF	(Netherlands)	Jos Hooiveld	39	7	0	1	0	0	1	1	0	41	8	0	3	0
27	MF	(Spain)	Iago Falque	1	0	0	0	0	0	0	0	0	1	0	0	0	0
28	DF	(England)	Ben Reeves	0(2)	0	0	1(2)	0	0	2	0	1	3(4)	0	1	0	0
29	FW	(Wales)	Ryan Doble	0	0	0	1	0	0	0	0	0	1	0	0	0	0
30	MF	(England)	James Ward-Prowse	0	0	0	1	1	0	1	0	0	2	1	0	0	0
31	GK	(England)	Tommy Forecast	0	0	0	0	0	0	0	0	0	0	0	0	0	0
32	DF	(England)	Jack Stephens	0	0	0	0(1)	0	0	0	0	0	0(1)	0	0	0	0
33	MF	(Belgium)	Steve De Ridder	5(25)	3	3	2	0	0	3	1	0	10(25)	4	3	5	0
34	DF	(England)	Luke Shaw	0	0	0	0(1)	0	0	0	0	0	0(1)	0	0	0	0
35	MF	(England)	Corby Moore	0	0	0	0	0	0	0	0	0	0	0	0	0	0
36	GK	(England)	Jack Dovey	0	0	0	0	0	0	0	0	0	0	0	0	0	0
39	DF	(England)	Harlee Dean	0	0	0	0	0	0	0	0	0	0	0	0	0	0
40	FW	(England)	Sam Hoskins	0	0	0	0(1)	0	0	0(1)	0	0	0(2)	0	0	0	0
42	MF	(England)	Jason Puncheon	4(4)	0	0	1	0	0	0	0	0	5(4)	0	0	1	0

== Transfers ==
Players transferred in
Date	Pos.	Name	From	Fee	Ref.
7 July 2011	MF	(England) Jack Cork	(England) Chelsea	Undisclosed	
22 July 2011	MF	(Belgium) Steve De Ridder	(Netherlands) De Graafschap	Undisclosed	
11 August 2011	DF	(Scotland) Danny Fox	(England) Burnley	Undisclosed	
1 December 2011	DF	(Netherlands) Jos Hooiveld	(Scotland) Celtic	Undisclosed	
25 January 2012	FW	(Japan) Tadanari Lee	(Japan) Sanfrecce Hiroshima	Free	
30 January 2012	FW	(England) Billy Sharp	(England) Doncaster Rovers	£1.8 million	
Players transferred out
Date	Pos.	Name	To	Fee	Ref.
1 July 2011	MF	(England) Oscar Gobern	(England) Huddersfield Town	£275,000	
8 August 2011	MF	(England) Alex Oxlade-Chamberlain	(England) Arsenal	£15 million	
22 August 2011	DF	(England) Joseph Mills	(England) Reading	Undisclosed	
3 February 2012	DF	(England) Jack Saville	(England) Barnet	Free	
Players loaned in
Start date	Pos.	Name	From	End date	Ref.
31 August 2011	DF	(Netherlands) Jos Hooiveld	(Scotland) Celtic	1 December 2011	
16 January 2012	MF	(Spain) Iago Falque	(England) Tottenham Hotspur	End of the season	
Players loaned out
Start date	Pos.	Name	To	End date	Ref.
11 August 2011	FW	(Wales) Ryan Doble	(England) Bournemouth	10 October 2011	
11 August 2011	GK	(England) Tommy Forecast	(England) Thurrock	10 September 2011	
11 August 2011	DF	(England) Jack Saville	(England) Hayes & Yeading United	11 September 2011	
31 August 2011	MF	(England) Jason Puncheon	(England) Queens Park Rangers	2 January 2012	
23 September 2011	GK	(England) Tommy Forecast	(England) Bromley	31 December 2011	
28 October 2011	GK	(England) Jack Dovey	(England) Eastleigh	End of season	
8 November 2011	DF	(England) Jack Saville	(England) Barnet	28 January 2012	
11 November 2011	FW	(Barbados) Jonathan Forte	(England) Preston North End	11 December 2011	
11 November 2011	FW	(England) Sam Hoskins	(England) Preston North End	11 December 2011	
24 November 2011	MF	(England) Harlee Dean	(England) Brentford	8 January 2012	
6 January 2012	DF	(England) Ryan Dickson	(England) Yeovil Town	6 February 2012	
17 January 2012	FW	(Wales) Ryan Doble	(England) Bury	17 February 2012	
27 January 2012	FW	(Barbados) Jonathan Forte	(England) Notts County	End of season	
9 February 2012	DF	(England) Ryan Dickson	(England) Leyton Orient	End of season	
14 February 2012	MF	(England) Lee Holmes	(England) Oxford United	14 March 2012	
14 March 2012	MF	(England) Lee Holmes	(England) Swindon Town	End of season	
15 March 2012	FW	(England) Sam Hoskins	(England) Rotherham United	End of season	
Players released
Date	Pos.	Name	Subsequent club	Join date	Ref.
1 July 2011	MF	(England) Callum McNish	(England) Exeter City	26 July 2011	
1 July 2011	FW	(England) Tony Garrod	(England) Farnborough	28 July 2011	
1 July 2011	MF	(Wales) Anthony Pulis	(England) Aldershot Town	2 August 2011	
1 July 2011	DF	(England) Sam Argent	(England) Hayes & Yeading United	3 August 2011	
1 July 2011	DF	(England) Ryan Tafazolli	(England) Eastleigh	12 August 2011	
