= 2008–09 Southampton F.C. season =

Southampton F.C.
2008–09 season
- Chairman: Michael Wilde
- Manager: Jan Poortvliet; Mark Wotte
- Stadium: St Mary's Stadium
- Championship: 23rd (relegated)
- FA Cup: Third round
- League Cup: Third round
- Top goalscorer: League: David McGoldrick (12); All: David McGoldrick (14)
- Highest home attendance: 31,901 (vs. Manchester United, 4 January 2009)
- Lowest home attendance: 11,331 vs Birmingham City, 26 August 2008)
- Average home league attendance: 18,149
Home colours	Away colours

The 2008–09 season was Southampton's fourth consecutive season in the Football League and their fourth also in the Championship.

== Season summary ==
Having narrowly avoided relegation the previous season, Southampton looked to improve their position in the league in 2008–09. The season was even more disappointing, however, as the Saints finished second from bottom to be relegated to League One, which they would start with a ten-point deduction as a result of its parent company, Southampton Leisure Holdings PLC, entering administration. The season was equally unsatisfactory in the cup tournaments, as the club were knocked out of both the FA Cup and the League Cup in the third round, losing 0–3 to Premier League champions Manchester United and 1–3 to League Two side Rotherham United. The season was worsened still by a change in management – head coach Jan Poortvliet resigned from the club on 23 January 2009, and youth academy manager Mark Wotte took over for the remainder of the season.

== Championship ==
Date	Opponents	H / A	Result F – A	Scorers	Attendance	League position
9 August 2008	Cardiff City	A	1–2	McGoldrick 45'	19,749	18th
16 August 2008	Birmingham City	H	1–2	Perry 43'	18,925	23rd
23 August 2008	Derby County	A	1–0	McGoldrick 58'	27,032	17th
30 August 2008	Blackpool	H	0–1		15,629	20th
14 September 2008	Queens Park Rangers	A	1–4	Lallana 53'	13,770	23rd
17 September 2008	Ipswich Town	H	2–2	Surman 12', Pekhart 68'	14,916	22nd
20 September 2008	Barnsley	H	0–0		14,836	22nd
27 September 2008	Doncaster Rovers	A	2–0	Mills 50' (o.g.), Surman 58' (pen.)	10,867	20th
30 September 2008	Norwich City	H	2–0	Robertson 29', McGoldrick 64' (pen.)	14,480	16th
4 October 2008	Coventry City	A	1–4	Surman 63'	15,518	20th
18 October 2008	Watford	H	0–3		17,454	20th
21 October 2008	Sheffield United	A	0–0		25,642	21st
25 October 2008	Swansea City	A	0–3		15,564	22nd
28 October 2008	Coventry City	H	1–1	McGoldrick 68'	14,226	22nd
1 November 2008	Preston North End	A	3–2	Pearce 64', Surman 69', McGoldrick 90'	11,508	20th
8 November 2008	Bristol City	H	0–1		14,535	21st
15 November 2008	Wolverhampton Wanderers	H	1–2	Pearce 21'	17,812	21st
22 November 2008	Reading	A	2–1	Wright-Phillips 14', 49'	23,121	20th
25 November 2008	Plymouth Argyle	H	0–0		14,895	20th
29 November 2008	Charlton Athletic	A	0–0		20,831	19th
6 December 2008	Sheffield Wednesday	H	1–1	Wright-Phillips 14'	15,440	19th
8 December 2008	Crystal Palace	A	0–3		13,799	20th
13 December 2008	Burnley	A	2–3	Skácel 49', Surman 61'	11,229	21st
20 December 2008	Nottingham Forest	H	0–2		26,580	21st
26 December 2008	Plymouth Argyle	A	0–2		15,197	21st
28 December 2008	Reading	H	1–1	McGoldrick 74'	20,142	23rd
10 January 2009	Barnsley	A	1–0	McGoldrick 76'	11,789	22nd
17 January 2009	Doncaster Rovers	H	1–2	Saganowski 90'	15,837	23rd
27 January 2009	Norwich City	A	2–2	McLaggon 57', Saganowski 78'	25,271	23rd
31 January 2009	Swansea City	H	2–2	Saganowski 17', 76'	17,623	23rd
3 February 2009	Sheffield United	H	1–2	Surman 90'	13,257	23rd
14 February 2009	Bristol City	A	0–2		17,000	23rd
21 February 2009	Preston North End	H	3–1	Surman 19', Saganowski 29', 42'	14,790	23rd
28 February 2009	Cardiff City	H	1–0	McGoldrick 11' (pen.)	18,526	22nd
3 March 2009	Ipswich Town	A	3–0	Euell 30, 85', Paterson 88'	20,040	22nd
7 March 2009	Birmingham City	A	0–1		16,735	22nd
10 March 2009	Derby County	H	1–1	Perry 59'	17,567	23rd
14 March 2009	Queens Park Rangers	H	0–0		18,691	23rd
21 March 2009	Blackpool	A	1–1	McGoldrick 69'	7,947	23rd
4 April 2009	Charlton Athletic	H	2–3	McGoldrick 17', Wright-Phillips 84'	27,228	23rd
7 April 2009	Watford	A	2–2	Saeijs 13', 89'	16,066	23rd
10 April 2009	Wolverhampton Wanderers	A	0–3		24,636	23rd
13 April 2009	Crystal Palace	H	1–0	McGoldrick 67'	23,220	23rd
18 April 2009	Sheffield Wednesday	A	0–2		24,145	23rd
25 April 2009	Burnley	H	2–2	Wright-Phillips 11', McGoldrick 44'	23,927	23rd
3 May 2009	Nottingham Forest	A	1–3	Wright-Phillips 16'	29,008	23rd

Round	1	2	3	4	5	6	7	8	9	10	11	12	13	14	15	16	17	18	19	20	21	22	23	24	25	26	27	28	29	30	31	32	33	34	35	36	37	38	39	40	41	42	43	44	45	46
Ground	A	H	A	H	A	H	H	A	H	A	H	A	A	H	A	H	H	A	H	A	H	A	A	H	A	H	A	H	A	H	H	A	H	H	A	A	H	H	A	H	A	A	H	A	H	A
Result	L	L	W	L	L	D	D	W	W	L	L	D	L	D	W	L	L	W	D	D	D	L	L	L	L	D	W	L	D	D	L	L	W	W	W	L	D	D	D	L	D	L	W	L	D	L
Position	18	23	17	20	23	22	22	20	16	20	20	21	22	22	20	21	21	20	20	19	19	20	21	21	21	23	22	23	23	23	23	23	23	22	22	22	23	23	23	23	23	23	23	23	23	23

Source: League Matches
A = Away; H = Home; W = Win; D = Draw; L = Loss

Pos	Club	Pld	W	D	L	GF	GA	GD	Pts
22	Norwich City	46	12	10	24	57	70	–13	46
23	Southampton	46	10	15	21	46	69	–23	45
24	Charlton Athletic	46	8	15	23	52	74	–22	39

Pld = Matches played; W = Matches won; D = Matches drawn; L = Matches lost; GF = Goals for; GA = Goals against; GD = Goal difference; Pts = Points

== FA Cup ==
Date	Round	Opponents	H / A	Result F–A	Scorers	Attendance
4 January 2009	Round 3	Manchester United	H	0–3		31,901

== League Cup ==
Date	Round	Opponents	H / A	Result F–A	Scorers	Attendance
12 August 2008	Round 1	Exeter City	A	3–1	Holmes 29', McGoldrick 77', 90' (pen.)	6,471
26 August 2008	Round 2	Birmingham City	H	2–0	Holmes 17', Lallana 86'	11,331
23 September 2008	Round 3	Rotherham United	A	1–3	John 61'	5,147

== Squad statistics ==
No.	Pos.	Name	League		FA Cup		League Cup		Total		Discipline	
No.	Pos.	Name	Apps	Goals	Apps	Goals	Apps	Goals	Apps	Goals	Yellow card	Red card
1	GK	(England) Kelvin Davis	46	0	1	0	0	0	47	0	0	0
2	DF	(England) Chris Perry	38(2)	2	1	0	2	0	43	2	6	0
3	DF	(England) Wayne Thomas	0	0	0	0	1	0	1	0	0	0
4	FW	(Poland) Marek Saganowski	14(5)	6	0	0	0	0	19	6	2	0
5	DF	(Netherlands) Jan-Paul Saeijs	20	2	0	0	0	0	20	2	5	0
6	DF	(Sweden) Michael Svensson	4	0	0	0	1	0	5	0	0	0
7	MF	(Czech Republic) Rudolf Skácel	28	1	1	0	0	0	29	1	7	0
8	FW	(England) Bradley Wright-Phillips	16(17)	6	0	0	1	0	34	6	1	0
9	FW	(Poland) Grzegorz Rasiak	0	0	0	0	0	0	0	0	0	0
10	MF	(England) Paul Wotton	18(11)	0	0	0	3	0	33	0	4	0
11	MF	(England) Andrew Surman	44	7	1	0	3	0	48	7	7	0
12	MF	(England) Lee Holmes	11	0	0(1)	0	2	2	14	2	0	0
13	GK	(England) Tommy Forecast	0	0	0	0	0	0	0	0	0	0
14	FW	(Trinidad and Tobago) Stern John	4(3)	0	0	0	0(3)	1	10	1	0	0
15	FW	(Jamaica) Jason Euell	18(6)	2	0	0	0	0	24	2	2	1
16	MF	(France) Romain Gasmi	0(4)	0	0	0	0	0	4	0	0	0
17	FW	(England) David McGoldrick	45(1)	12	1	0	3	2	50	14	7	0
18	MF	(England) Nathan Dyer	1(3)	0	0	0	0(1)	0	5	0	0	0
19	MF	(France) Morgan Schneiderlin	23(7)	0	0(1)	0	2	0	33	0	6	0
20	MF	(England) Adam Lallana	34(6)	1	0	0	3	1	43	2	2	0
21	DF	(England) Jamie Hatch	0	0	0	0	0	0	0	0	0	0
22	MF	(England) Simon Gillett	23(4)	0	1	0	2	0	30	0	5	0
23	DF	(Wales) Lloyd James	40(1)	0	1	0	3	0	45	0	11	0
24	DF	(England) Olly Lancashire	10(1)	0	0	0	1	0	12	0	3	2
25	GK	(England) Michael Poke	0	0	0	0	0	0	0	0	0	0
26	MF	(Trinidad and Tobago) Jake Thomson	6(4)	0	0	0	1	0	11	0	0	0
27	DF	(United States) Kyle Davies	0	0	0	0	0	0	0	0	0	0
28	GK	(Poland) Bartosz Bialkowski	0	0	0	0	3	0	3	0	0	0
29	DF	(England) Jeffrey Imudia	0	0	0	0	0	0	0	0	0	0
30	MF	(England) Jack Boyle	0	0	0	0	0	0	0	0	0	0
32	GK	(Slovakia) Andrej Pernecký	0	0	0	0	0	0	0	0	0	0
33	DF	(England) Joseph Mills	6(2)	0	0	0	1(1)	0	10	0	0	0
34	FW	(England) Jamie White	2(1)	0	0	0	0	0	3	0	0	0
35	FW	(Scotland) Matt Paterson	1(10)	1	1	0	0	0	12	1	0	1
36	DF	(England) Michael Byrne	0	0	0	0	0	0	0	0	0	0
37	MF	(England) Oscar Gobern	4(2)	0	1	0	0	0	7	0	1	0
38	DF	(England) Jack Saville	0	0	0	0	0	0	0	0	0	0
39	MF	(England) Ryan Smith	7(6)	0	1	0	0	0	14	0	0	0
40	MF	(Wales) Anthony Pulis	0	0	0	0	0	0	0	0	0	0
41	DF	(Hungary) Zoltán Lipták	0(7)	0	0	0	0	0	7	0	0	0
42	FW	(Wales) Kayne McLaggon	1(6)	1	0(1)	0	0	0	8	1	0	0
43	DF	(England) Lee Molyneux	4	0	0	0	0	0	4	0	2	1
44	DF	(England) Ben Reeves	0	0	0	0	0	0	0	0	0	0
45	MF	(England) Callum McNish	0	0	0	0	0	0	0	0	0	0
Players who left before the end of the season
5	DF	(England) Andrew Davies	0	0	0	0	0	0	0	0	0	0
6	DF	(England) Darren Powell	0	0	0	0	0	0	0	0	0	0
30	DF	(England) Jack Cork	22(1)	0	0	0	2	0	25	0	3	0
31	FW	(Czech Republic) Tomáš Pekhart	2(7)	1	0	0	0(1)	0	10	1	0	0
38	FW	(England) Jordan Robertson	8(2)	1	0	0	0	0	10	1	1	0
41	DF	(England) Alex Pearce	6(3)	2	0	0	0	0	9	2	1	0

== Transfers ==
=== In ===
Date	Pos.	Name	From	Fee
7 July 2008	GK	(England) Tommy Forecast	(England) Tottenham Hotspur	Undisclosed
29 August 2008	MF	(Wales) Anthony Pulis	(England) Stoke City	Free
1 January 2009	DF	(England) Lee Molyneux	(England) Everton	Free
1 January 2009	MF	(England) Ryan Smith	(England) Millwall	Free

=== Out ===
Date	Pos.	Name	To	Fee
2 July 2008	DF	(Sweden) Alexander Östlund	(Denmark) Esbjerg	Released
2 July 2008	DF	(England) Darren Powell	Unattached	Released
2 July 2008	MF	(England) Jermaine Wright	(England) Blackpool	Released
2 July 2008	MF	(Czech Republic) Mario Lička	(Czech Republic) Baník Ostrava	Released
2 July 2008	MF	(Spain) Iñigo Idiakez	Unattached	Released
2 July 2008	FW	(France) Cédric Baseya	(France) Lille OSC	Free
7 July 2008	MF	(Morocco) Youssef Safri	Qatar SC	£275,000
1 August 2008	MF	(Colombia) Jhon Viáfara	(Colombia) Once Caldas	Released
19 August 2008	DF	(England) Andrew Davies	(England) Stoke City	Undisclosed

=== Loan in ===
Date from	Date to	Pos.	Name	From
21 August 2008	1 January 2009	DF	(England) Jack Cork	(England) Chelsea
26 August 2008	29 December 2008	FW	(Czech Republic) Tomáš Pekhart	(England) Tottenham Hotspur
1 September 2008	End of season	MF	(France) Romain Gasmi	(France) RC Strasbourg
26 September 2008	26 December 2008	FW	(England) Jordan Robertson	(England) Sheffield United
3 October 2008	3 January 2009	MF	(England) Ryan Smith	(England) Millwall
30 October 2008	1 January 2009	DF	(Scotland) Alex Pearce	(England) Reading
9 January 2009	End of season	DF	(Netherlands) Jan-Paul Saeijs	(Netherlands) Roda JC
2 February 2009	End of season	DF	(Hungary) Zoltán Lipták	(Hungary) Újpest

=== Loan out ===
Date from	Date to	Pos.	Name	To
18 July 2008	End of season	GK	(England) Michael Poke	(England) Torquay United
8 August 2008	31 December 2008	FW	(Poland) Marek Saganowski	(Denmark) Aalborg BK
15 August 2008	End of season	FW	(Poland) Grzegorz Rasiak	(England) Watford
26 September 2008	26 December 2008	MF	(England) Nathan Dyer	(England) Sheffield United
24 October 2008	End of season	FW	(Trinidad and Tobago) Stern John	(England) Bristol City
14 November 2008	8 January 2009	FW	(England) Jamie White	(England) Shrewsbury Town
2 January 2009	End of season	MF	(England) Nathan Dyer	(Wales) Swansea City
8 January 2009	19 February 2009	MF	(England) Jake Thomson	(England) AFC Bournemouth
23 February 2009	End of season	DF	(England) Joseph Mills	(England) Scunthorpe United
18 March 2009	End of season	GK	(Poland) Bartosz Białkowski	(England) Ipswich Town
