= Lee Holmes =

English footballer

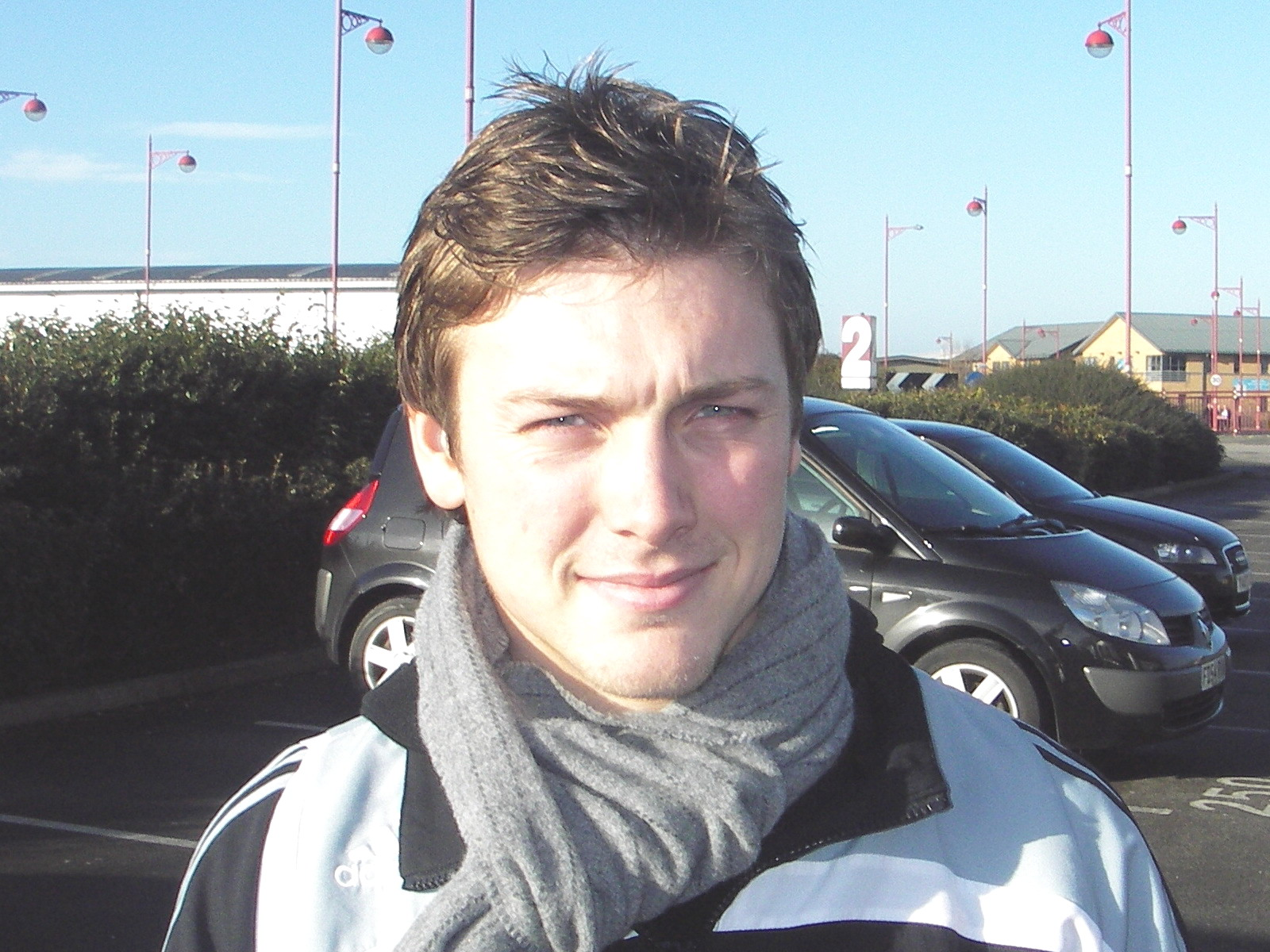
- Holmes in 2008

Personal information
- Full name: Lee Daniel Holmes
- Date of birth: 2 April 1987 (age 39)
- Place of birth: Mansfield, England
- Height: 5 ft 9 in (1.75 m)
- Position: Left midfielder

Youth career
- –2002: Derby County

Senior career*
Years	Team	Apps	(Gls)
2002–2008	Derby County	46	(2)
2004–2005	→ Swindon Town (loan)	15	(1)
2006	→ Bradford City (loan)	16	(0)
2008	→ Walsall (loan)	19	(4)
2008–2012	Southampton	29	(1)
2012	→ Oxford United (loan)	7	(2)
2012	→ Swindon Town (loan)	10	(1)
2012–2015	Preston North End	60	(6)
2014	→ Portsmouth (loan)	5	(0)
2015	→ Exeter City (loan)	8	(0)
2015–2020	Exeter City	114	(12)
2021	Mickleover	6	(1)
Total		335	(31)

International career
2002	England U16	4	(0)
2003	England U17	3	(0)
2004–2006	England U19	18	(1)
- * Club domestic league appearances and goals

Lee Daniel Holmes (born 2 April 1987) is an English former professional footballer who played as a midfielder.

Holmes began his career with Derby County and became their youngest ever player and goalscorer, as well as the youngest footballer to appear in the FA Cup. He has represented England at the under 16, under 17 and the under 19 level.

== Playing career ==
=== Derby County ===
Holmes began his career with Derby County, appearing for the club's under 18 side when he was only 14.

Even before he made his senior debut, he hit the headlines when he scored after just 38 seconds for England under 16s in a Victory Shield match against Northern Ireland. England went on to win the 2002 Victory Shield with two more victories.

Holmes made his debut for Derby on Boxing Day, 2002 against Grimsby Town. He broke the club record for the youngest player to appear at just 15 years and 268 days. Holmes held the record for almost nine years until Mason Bennett beat it by 169 days in October 2011.

He made another two more appearances during the 2002–03 season, both within two weeks of his debut. The second game was against Brentford when he became the youngest player to play in the proper rounds of the FA Cup. His record has since been broken by Luke Freeman for Gillingham.

In March 2003, Holmes helped the England under 17s to qualify for the 2003 UEFA European Under-17 Football Championship in Portugal with a 2–0 win in the qualifying match against Scotland.

Holmes became a regular in the Derby side during the first half of the 2003–04 season. In September 2003, his manager George Burley issued a "hands-off" warning to teams trying to sign Holmes as well as fellow teenager Tom Huddlestone.

Still aged 16, Holmes scored his first Derby goal in a 3–1 defeat to Coventry City on 25 October 2003 to become the club's youngest goalscorer. In November, Holmes was a target of Chelsea's recruitment drive of young England footballers.

Holmes played three games for Derby at the start of the 2004–05 season and also appeared for England under 19s scoring in a 1–1 draw with the Czech Republic. In December 2004, he joined Swindon Town in League One on an initial one-month loan.

He made his Swindon debut two years to the day after his Derby debut in a 2–0 victory against Peterborough United. Holmes' loan deal was twice extended after he impressed during his first two months at Swindon. He scored his only Swindon goal during his final month in a 1–1 draw with Doncaster Rovers. Holmes played 15 league games for Swindon, winning the club's young player of the season award, before returning to Derby County. He made one final appearance for Derby in the 2004–05 season before he played in the 2005 UEFA European Under-19 Championship in Northern Ireland, scoring in England's 3–1 final defeat to France.

In January 2006, Holmes signed a new contract at Derby keeping him with the club until the end of the 2007–08 season. The following month, he was named the captain of England under 19s against Slovakia, which he marked with another goal in a 3–0 victory.

Holmes again moved on loan at the start of the 2006–07 signing for Bradford City with full back Nathan Doyle. Holmes made his debut for Bradford in their opening day 1–0 defeat to Nottingham Forest.

Holmes spent time on trial with Dutch side NAC Breda but remained at Derby without playing in a match during 2007.

In January 2008, Holmes joined League One side Walsall on a season-long loan. He made his debut for Walsall, and his first game in more than 13 months in a 2–2 draw with his former side Swindon Town on 12 January 2008. He scored his first goal in a 2–1 defeat to Carlisle United on 2 February 2008 and followed it up with a goal in his next match in a 2–0 victory against Yeovil Town. Two weeks later he scored in each half to take his run to four goals in four games in a 3–0 victory over Swindon Town. Holmes played a total of 19 games for Walsall during his loan but was unable to add to his four early goals.

Holmes returned to Derby at the end of the season, but the club decided not to renew his contract, and he was one of four players to be released.

=== Southampton ===
On 6 June 2008, Holmes turned down Leeds United and Nottingham Forest to instead sign for Championship side Southampton as their first summer signing. He was attracted by the promising youth set up under new coach Jan Poortvliet, chairman Michael Wilde and the size of the club. Holmes made his debut for Southampton in the opening game of the 2008–09 season against Cardiff City. Holmes was substituted in the second half, replaced by Bradley Wright-Phillips, as Southampton lost 2–1. Holmes scored in his second game with Southampton, as they defeated League Two side Exeter City 3–1 in the first round of the League Cup. Holmes started Southampton's opening seven games of the season, and scored a second goal, once again in the League Cup, but was injured in a 4–1 defeat to Queens Park Rangers in September. Holmes left Rangers' ground on crutches after suffering medial ligament damage in his right knee. The injury forced him to spend six weeks in a leg brace, and kept him out of action for three months. Although it did not require surgery, Holmes also suffered some cartilage damage, which had to be treated by a minor operation.

Southampton struggled without Holmes, who returned to action in a 2–0 defeat to another team fighting against relegation Nottingham Forest on 20 December 2008. As a result of the club's form Poortvliet resigned as manager and was replaced by his assistant Mark Wotte, in whose first game in charge, Holmes again went off injured. The injury was diagnosed as a recurrence of his previous injury and was expected to keep him out for another four weeks.

He was named on the bench for the first game of the 2009–10 Season against Millwall, but never featured. After being named on the bench for some cup games, he started against Millwall on 16 January.

On 1 October 2011, he came on as a substitute to score Southampton's fourth goal against Watford. This was his first league goal for the club.

On 14 February 2012, Holmes signed a one-month loan deal at League Two side Oxford United, which made him available for their match against Dagenham and Redbridge at the Kassam Stadium. He set up both goals in a victory over rivals Swindon, and then scored twice in a 2–2 draw with Shrewsbury Town. On 14 March 2012, Holmes returned to his former club, Swindon Town, on loan for the remainder of the season.

On 19 May, it was announced that he was to be released by Southampton at the end of the season.

=== Preston North End ===
On 28 May 2012, he agreed to join Preston North End with effect from 1 July. On 17 December 2013, Holmes extended his contract with Preston for a further twelve months, thus keeping him at the club until the summer of 2015. On 24 November 2014, Holmes signed on loan to Portsmouth until January 2015. On 16 March 2015, Holmes joined Exeter on loan until the end of the season.

=== Exeter City ===
On 28 May 2015, Holmes joined Exeter City on a permanent basis following his loan spell from Preston. On 8 January Exeter played the first leg of their FA Cup match against Liverpool and on the stroke of half time, Holmes scored directly from a corner kick. After a consistent performance throughout the 2015–16 campaign, Holmes was voted player of the season by Exeter city fans. On 3 January 2017, Holmes was ruled out for the rest of the campaign with an ankle injury after a collision in a match against Yeovil Town. Holmes was released by Exeter at the end of his contract in July 2020.

=== Non-league ===
He signed for Northern Premier League Premier League side Mickleover on a free transfer in September 2021. Holmes would leave the club in October 2021, after making 7 appearances and scoring one goal for Mickleover.

== Personal life ==
Holmes is a Christian. He lives in Arizona in 2020 with his wife and children. His son, Freddie, was born in 2011.

== Career statistics ==
As of match played 12 October 2021

Appearances and goals by club, season and competition
Club	Season	League			FA Cup		League Cup		Other		Total	
Club	Season	Division	Apps	Goals	Apps	Goals	Apps	Goals	Apps	Goals	Apps	Goals
Derby County	2002–03	First Division	2	0	1	0	0	0	—		3	0
Derby County	2003–04	First Division	23	2	1	0	0	0	—		24	2
Derby County	2004–05	Championship	3	0	0	0	1	0	0	0	4	0
Derby County	2005–06	Championship	18	0	2	0	1	0	—		21	0
Derby County	2006–07	Championship	0	0	0	0	0	0	0	0	0	0
Derby County	2007–08	Premier League	0	0	0	0	0	0	—		0	0
Derby County	Total		46	2	4	0	2	0	0	0	52	2
Swindon Town (loan)	2004–05	League One	15	1	0	0	0	0	1 (Note: Appearance(s) in Football League Trophy)	0	16	1
Bradford City (loan)	2006–07	League One	16	0	1	0	1	0	1	0	19	0
Walsall (loan)	2007–08	League One	19	4	0	0	0	0	0	0	19	4
Southampton	2008–09	Championship	11	0	1	0	2	2	—		14	2
Southampton	2009–10	League One	5	0	2	0	0	0	1	0	8	0
Southampton	2010–11	League One	7	0	2	0	1	0	0	0	10	0
Southampton	2011–12	Championship	6	1	1	0	4	0	—		11	1
Southampton	Total		29	1	6	0	7	2	1	0	43	3
Oxford United (loan)	2011–12	League Two	7	2	0	0	0	0	0	0	7	2
Swindon Town (loan)	2011–12	League Two	10	1	0	0	0	0	1	0	11	1
Preston North End	2012–13	League One	28	3	2	0	1	0	2	0	33	3
Preston North End	2013–14	League One	32	3	5	0	2	0	2 (Note: One appearance in Football League Trophy, one appearance in League One play-offs)	0	41	3
Preston North End	2014–15	League One	0	0	0	0	0	0	1	0	1	0
Preston North End	Total		60	6	7	0	3	0	5	0	75	6
Portsmouth (loan)	2014–15	League Two	5	2	0	0	0	0	0	0	5	2
Exeter City (loan)	2014–15	League Two	8	0	0	0	0	0	0	0	8	0
Exeter City	2015–16	League Two	37	2	3	1	1	0	1	0	42	3
Exeter City	2016–17	League Two	16	5	1	0	0	0	4 (Note: One appearance in EFL Trophy, three appearances in League Two play-offs)	0	21	5
Exeter City	2017–18	League Two	27	2	2	0	1	1	1 (Note: Appearance in EFL Trophy)	0	31	3
Exeter City	2018–19	League Two	34	3	0	0	1	0	0	0	35	3
Exeter City	2019–20	League Two	0	0	0	0	0	0	0	0	0	0
Exeter City	Total		122	12	6	1	3	1	6	0	137	14
Mickleover	2021–22	Northern Premier League	6	1	1	0	0	0	0	0	7	1
Career total			335	31	25	1	16	3	14	0	390	35

== Honours ==
Derby County

- Football League Championship play-offs: 2007

Swindon Town

- Football League Two: 2011–12
- Football League Trophy runner-up: 2011–12

Preston North End

- Football League One play-offs: 2015

England Under-16

- Victory Shield: 2002

Individual

- Swindon Town Young Player of the Season: 2004–05
