= Markus Liebherr Memorial Cup =

- Founded: 2011
- Region: Europe
- Teams: 3
- Current champions: (England) Arsenal (1st title)
- Most championships: (Spain) Athletic Bilbao (England) Arsenal (1 title each)

The Markus Liebherr Memorial Cup was an invitational football friendly tournament held at St Mary's, Southampton. The competition was named after former Southampton Chairman Markus Liebherr. Described as a "unique triangular cup competition", each club played one another and points determined the winners of the tournament, which was held in 2011 and 2012, and won by Athletic Bilbao and Arsenal.

== 2011 ==
The inaugural edition of the Markus Liebherr Memorial Cup was held on 23 July 2011 as a triangular round-robin system. Various European teams were invited to compete in a tournament, with the other participants besides the hosts Southampton being the Spanish club Athletic Bilbao and German club Werder Bremen. The hosts won the first match of the tournament, beating Bremen 3–0 with goals from David Connolly, Guly do Prado and Adam Lallana. Bilbao also beat Bremen, with a 2–1 scoreline, thanks to goals from Igor Gabilondo and Gaizka Toquero. In the decisive match between Southampton and Bilbao, it was the Spanish side who won 2–0, with Igor Martínez and Markel Susaeta sealing the title to Bilbao.

23 July 2011
16:00 BST

Southampton	3–0^{(45-minute match)}	Werder Bremen
Connolly 10' do Prado 30'; Lallana 40'	Report

St Mary's Stadium, Southampton
Attendance: 7,000
23 July 2011
18:30 BST

Werder Bremen	1–2^{(45-minute match)}	Athletic Bilbao
Bargfrede 35'	Report	Gabilondo 22'; Toquero 37'

St Mary's Stadium, Southampton
Attendance: 7,000
23 July 2011
19:00 BST

Southampton	0–2^{(45-minute match)}	Athletic Bilbao
	Report	Martínez 36'; Susaeta 45'

St Mary's Stadium, Southampton
Attendance: 7,000
Referee: Ron Groves
- Each match lasted 45 minutes each. Drawn matches were resolved by extra-time and then penalties.

=== Final standings ===
Team	Pld	W	D	L	GF	GA	GD	Pts
(Spain) Athletic Bilbao	2	2	0	0	4	1	+3	4
(England) Southampton	2	1	0	1	3	2	1	2
(Germany) Werder Bremen	2	0	0	2	0	5	−5	0

== 2012 ==
Scottish club Rangers were initially scheduled to take part, but were later replaced by Anderlecht due to the financial troubles that Rangers were facing. The tournament was held on 14 July as a triangular round-robin system in 45-minute matches, and in the first match of the tournament, Southampton lost to Anderlecht 1–0, with the only goal coming early in the first half from Tom De Sutter. Arsenal then won their first game against Anderlecht by the same scoreline, with a goal from young midfielder Henri Lansbury deciding the match. In the decisive match between Southampton and Arsenal, the Saints new signing Jay Rodriguez netted on his debut for the club in the 31st minute, although the lead proved short-lived when Gervinho equalized a few minutes later, causing the game to end in a tie, and despite Arsenal losing 5–4 on penalties, it was them who won the second Memorial Cup and joined Athletic Bilbao on the honours list.

14 July 2012
17:15 BST

Southampton	0–1^{(45-minute match)}	(Belgium) Anderlecht
	Report	De Sutter 15'

St Mary's Stadium, Southampton
Attendance: 13,056
Referee: Phil Crossley
14 July 2012
18:45 BST

Arsenal (England)	1 – 0^{(45-minute match)}	(Belgium) Anderlecht
Lansbury 34'	Report

St. Mary's Stadium, Southampton
Referee: Dermot Gallagher (Ireland)
14 July 2012
20:00 BST

Southampton	1–1^{(45-minute match)}	Arsenal
Rodriguez 31'	Report	Gervinho 35'
Penalties
Fox (penalty scored); Rodriguez (penalty scored); Seaborne (penalty scored); Chaplow (penalty scored); Hammond (penalty scored)	5–4	(penalty scored) Santos; (penalty scored) Coquelin; (penalty scored) Olsson; (penalty scored) Eastmond; (penalty missed) Ebecilio

St Mary's Stadium, Southampton
Attendance: 13,056
- Each match lasted 45 minutes each. Drawn matches were resolved by extra-time and then penalties.

=== Final standings ===
Team	Pld	W	D	L	GF	GA	GD	Pts
(England) Arsenal	2	1	1	0	2	1	+1	4
(Belgium) Anderlecht	2	1	0	1	1	1	0	2
(England) Southampton	2	0	1	1	1	2	−1	1
