= Tommy Forecast =

English footballer (born 1986)

Personal information
- Full name: Tommy Steven Forecast
- Date of birth: 15 October 1986 (age 40)
- Place of birth: Newham, London, England
- Height: 6 ft 6 in (1.98 m)
- Position: Goalkeeper

Youth career
- 2002–2007: Tottenham Hotspur

Senior career*
Years	Team	Apps	(Gls)
2007–2008	Tottenham Hotspur	0	(0)
2008–2013	Southampton	0	(0)
2009	→ Grimsby Town (loan)	4	(0)
2011	→ Eastbourne Borough (loan)	5	(0)
2011	→ Thurrock (loan)	2	(0)
2011	→ Bromley (loan)	11	(0)
2012–2013	→ Gillingham (loan)	2	(0)
2013–2014	Chelmsford City	8	(0)
2013	→ Dartford (loan)	2	(0)
Total		34	(0)
- * Club domestic league appearances and goals

Tommy Steven Forecast (born 15 October 1986) is an English former professional footballer who played as a goalkeeper.

Having started his career with Tottenham Hotspur, he made his debut in the Football League for Grimsby Town, after joining the club on loan from Southampton. He also played for Eastbourne Borough, Thurrock, Bromley, Gillingham, Chelmsford City and Dartford.

== Career ==
=== Tottenham Hotspur ===
Born in Newham, London, Forecast joined the Tottenham Hotspur Academy system, and his first major impact came in the 2004–05 season with a string of fine displays as their Under-18s goalkeeper and helped his team reach the semi-finals of the FA Youth Cup which included saves in a penalty shootout at Anfield.

After his stand out successes in the FA Youth Cup he was named in the first team squad as substitute six times during the 2007–08 Premier League but never played in a first-team game and quickly decided on a move away from White Hart Lane.

=== Southampton ===
In July 2008, Forecast was signed by Southampton for an undisclosed fee on a five-year contract. Forecast's transfer from Tottenham to Southampton was a result of a renegotiation of Gareth Bale's sell-on clause, who had made the reverse move in the previous season, after Southampton entered financial troubles. At Southampton, he became very much a third choice keeper behind Kelvin Davis and Bartosz Białkowski, and therefore appeared more at reserve team level; however after Białkowski's loan to Ipswich Town at the end of the 2008–09 season he became second choice keeper.

On 13 August 2009, Forecast joined Grimsby Town on a one-month loan following an injury to Town's first-choice goalkeeper Nick Colgan. Forecast made his full professional debut the following day for Grimsby against Crewe Alexandra in a 4–0 defeat, The Crewe Chronicle described Forecast's debut as "one of the most shockingly inept displays the Football League has ever seen". Grimsby sent Forecast back early from his loan spell on 3 September after he failed to impress in his four games with The Mariners, and with Colgan still out on the sidelines Town manager Mike Newell opted to bring in Josh Lillis from Scunthorpe United to fill in the sticks until Colgan's return.

During the 2010–11 season, Forecast found himself demoted to the fourth choice keeper at Southampton, having fallen behind Jack Dovey in the pecking order, who would fill in on the bench for Davis and Białkowski in the club's league fixtures.

On 31 January 2011, he joined Eastbourne Borough on a 28-day loan, and on 11 August 2011, he joined Thurrock on loan for a month following which he was loaned to Bromley for a three-month period.

On 4 June 2013, Southampton confirmed on their website that Forecast, alongside seven other professional players, would be released.

=== Gillingham (loan) ===
On 20 July 2012, Forecast joined Gillingham on a season-long loan as part of a deal for highly rated young Gillingham keeper Paulo Gazzaniga He made his Gillingham debut on 4 September 2012 in a Football League Trophy tie away at Crawley Town. The game ended in a 3–2 defeat for the Gills. He made his League debut for Gillingham on 24 November 2012 away to Accrington Stanley. With Gillingham 1–0 up, first-choice goalkeeper Stuart Nelson was sent off and Forecast was brought on to play in goal. Due to the suspension of Nelson, Forecast played the Gills next match which was an FA Cup second round tie away at Preston North End. Before the tie, Martin Allen praised Forecast for his hard-work and believed he was getting better and better. The game ended in a 2–0 defeat for Gillingham and it was Forecast's third appearance of the season.

Upon Gillingham winning promotion to Football League One, Forecast had the unusual honour of being part of a team that achieved promotion three years in a row with Southampton winning successive promotions. However, aside from loan spells elsewhere, Forecast only managed two League appearances in these three campaigns.

=== Chelmsford City ===
On 11 August 2013, Forecast signed for Chelmsford City of the Conference South.

He joined Dartford on loan for one month from 24 October.

== Career statistics ==
Appearances and goals by club, season and competition
Club	Season	League			FA Cup		League Cup		Other		Total	
Club	Season	Division	Apps	Goals	Apps	Goals	Apps	Goals	Apps	Goals	Apps	Goals
Tottenham Hotspur	2005–06	Premier League	0	0	0	0	0	0	—		0	0
Tottenham Hotspur	2006–07	Premier League	0	0	0	0	0	0	0	0	0	0
Tottenham Hotspur	2007–08	Premier League	0	0	0	0	0	0	0	0	0	0
Tottenham Hotspur	Total		0	0	0	0	0	0	0	0	0	0
Southampton	2008–09	Championship	0	0	0	0	0	0	—		0	0
Southampton	2009–10	League One	0	0	0	0	0	0	0	0	0	0
Southampton	2010–11	League One	0	0	0	0	0	0	0	0	0	0
Southampton	2011–12	Championship	0	0	0	0	0	0	—		0	0
Southampton	2012–13	Premier League	0	0	0	0	0	0	—		0	0
Southampton	Total		0	0	0	0	0	0	0	0	0	0
Grimsby Town (loan)	2009–10	League Two	4	0	0	0	0	0	0	0	4	0
Eastbourne Borough (loan)	2010–11	Conference Premier	5	0	0	0	—		2 (Note: Appearance(s) in FA Trophy)	0	7	0
Thurrock (loan)	2011–12	Conference South	2	0	0	0	—		0	0	2	0
Bromley (loan)	2011–12	Conference South	11	0	4	0	—		1	0	16	0
Gillingham (loan)	2012–13	League Two	2	0	1	0	0	0	1 (Note: Appearance(s) in Football League Trophy)	0	4	0
Chelmsford City	2013–14	Conference South	8	0	0	0	—		0	0	8	0
Dartford (loan)	2013–14	Conference Premier	2	0	0	0	—		0	0	2	0
Career total			34	0	5	0	0	0	4	0	43	0
