= Begbies Traynor =

Corporate restructuring firm

Begbies Traynor Group plc

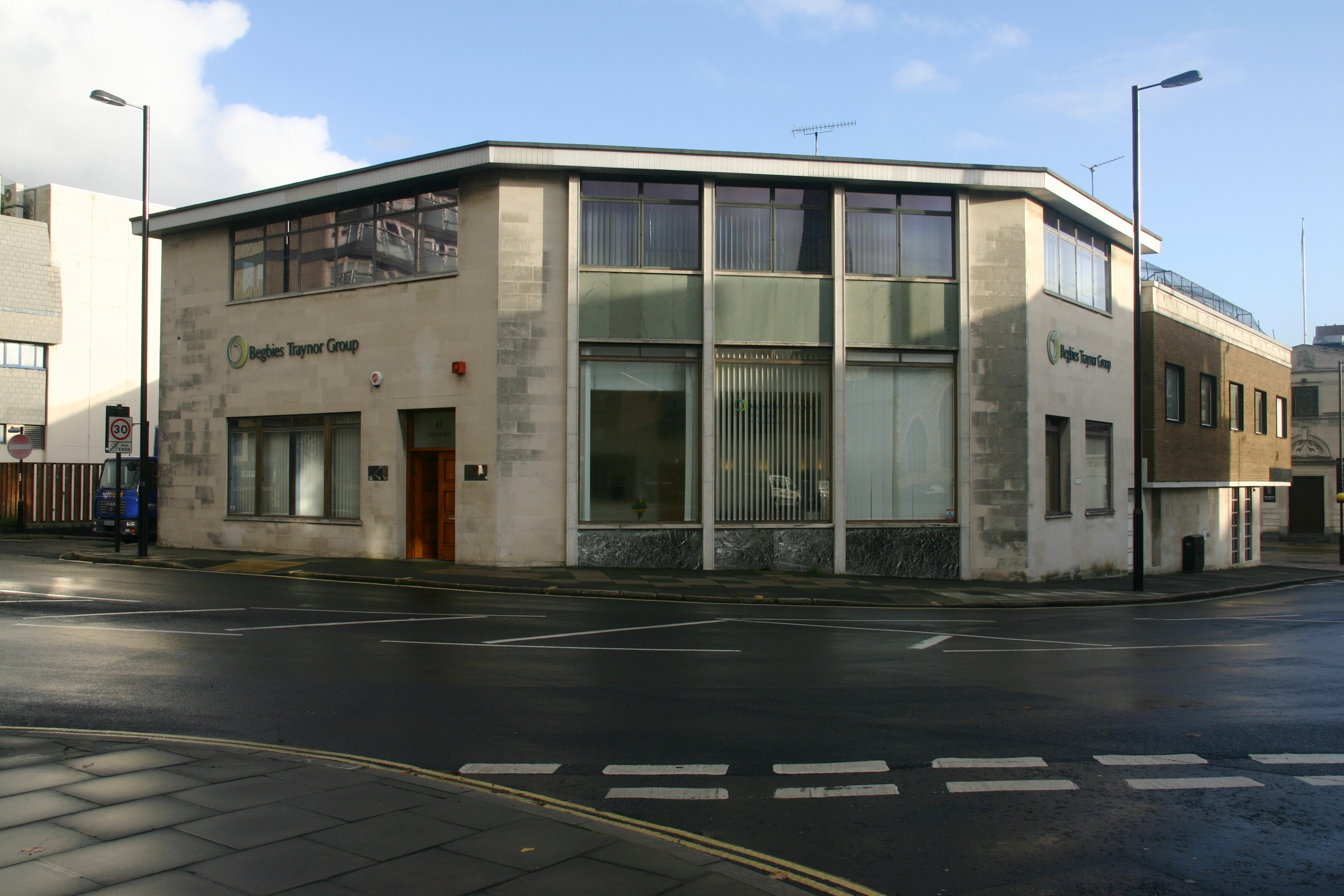
- Offices in Southampton
- Type: Public
- Traded as: AIM: BEG
- Industry: Professional services
- Founded: 1989
- Headquarters: 340 Deansgate; Manchester, United Kingdom
- Number of locations: 75 offices
- Website: www.begbies-traynorgroup.com

Begbies Traynor (LSE: BEG) (until 1997 known as Traynor & Partners) is a firm specialising in corporate restructuring. They were formed in 1989, expanded through mergers and organic growth and were floated in 2004. The company employs over 700 people and has over 100 offices around the United Kingdom.

== History ==
The company was formed as Traynor & Partners in 1989 by Ric Traynor and Andrew Dick. It traded under this name for eight years, growing during this period to cover much of Northern England. In 1997 Traynor took over London-based firm Begbies, founded by George Begbie, and was renamed Begbies Traynor.

The company was floated on the Alternative Investment Market in August 2004, becoming the first insolvency specialist to do so. It was initially intended that this should occur in July 2004, but was put back by a month. At this point the company had 23 offices and 240 employees.

Begbies benefited from the economic downturn caused by the credit crunch in 2008, with business initially increasing. Ric Traynor predicted at the beginning of 2009 that shares would increase in value to around 150p, although Brewin Dolphin stated that 140p was more likely. However, a decline in its tax business saw company profits fall short of predictions despite increased turnover in its insolvency division, and share prices fell below 100p in early 2010. Begbies' business was affected by a reduction in insolvencies following the introduction of increased government support; although profits for the 2009/10 financial year were higher than those for the previous year, they were well below expectations, and share prices fell to a low of 59.5p in June 2010. The company lost its chief financial officer, John Gittins, to a rival firm from August 2010.

In May 2010 Begbies Traynor renegotiated a financing deal with banks HSBC and Yorkshire Bank which increased its credit facility to £30 million. This allowed the company to expand further, announcing the opening of a new office in Reading in early June 2010.

In March 2021, Begbies Traynor decided to purchase David Rubin & Partners for up to £25 million. The upfront sum was £12 million, and cash earn-out payments worth up to £13 million contingent on the purchased business's financial results.

== Notable projects ==
The company have helped to restructure or liquidate a number of notable companies, including:

- Huddersfield Town F.C.
- Tillingbourne Bus Company
- Scarborough F.C.
- Wrexham F.C.
- FM Rail
- Tiger Telematics
- A.F.C. Bournemouth
- Southampton Leisure Holdings PLC
- Northcott Theatre
- Realtime Worlds
- Port Vale F.C.
- Crawley Town F.C.
- Wigan Athletic F.C.
- Sheffield Wednesday F.C.

== Publications ==
Begbies Traynor publishes a quarterly "red flag alert" highlighting British companies at risk of significant "financial distress" and the industry sectors most affected by financial pressures. The alerts were first published in 2004. The algorithms underlying Begbies Traynor's analyses were revised in 2023.
