= Jack Cork =

English footballer (born 1989)

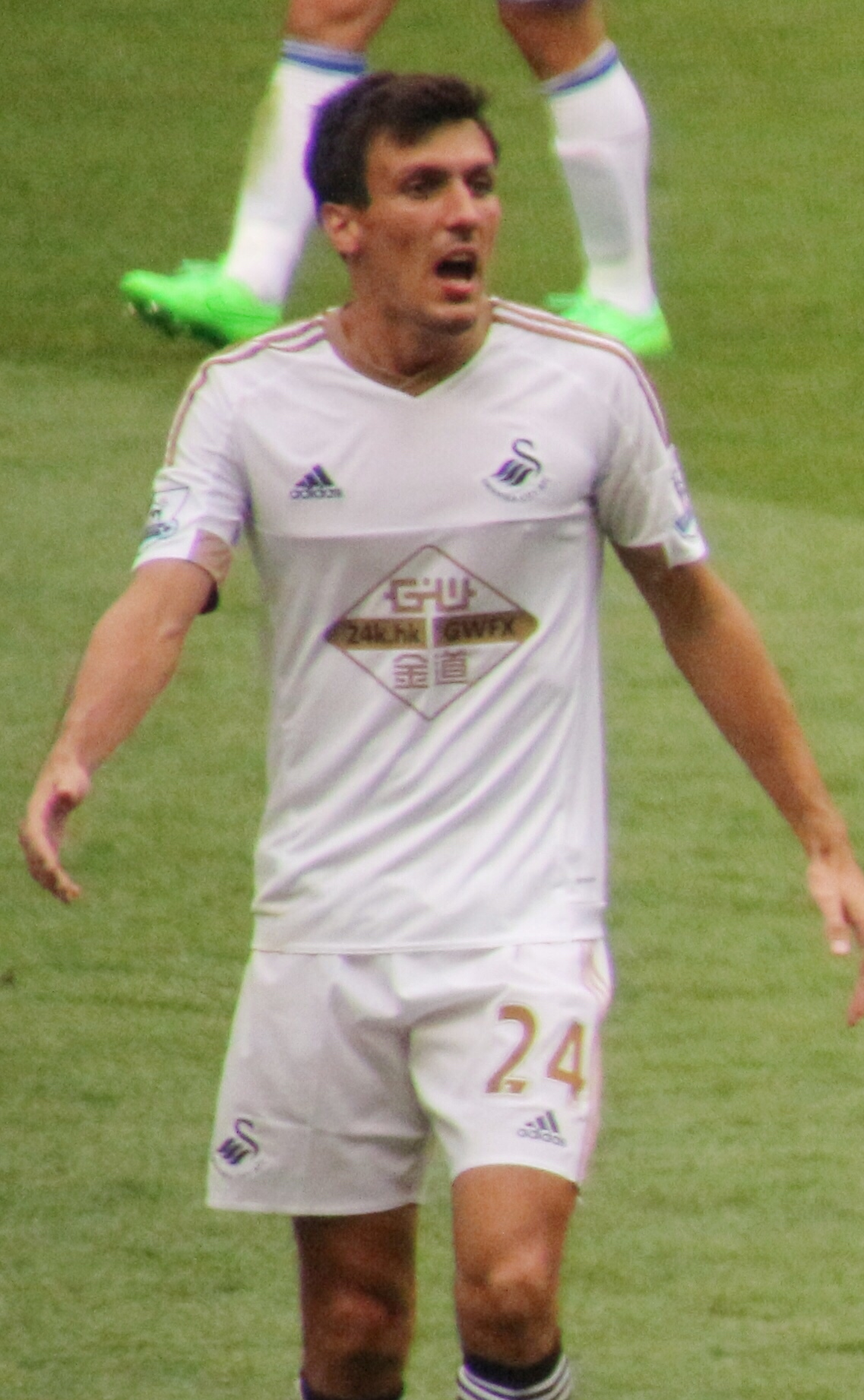
- Cork playing for Swansea City in 2015

Personal information
- Full name: Jack Frank Porteous Cork
- Date of birth: 25 June 1989 (age 37)
- Place of birth: Carshalton, England
- Height: 6 ft 0 in (1.83 m)
- Position: Defensive midfielder

Team information
- Current team: Burnley (first team coach)

Youth career
- 1998–2006: Chelsea

Senior career*
Years	Team	Apps	(Gls)
2006–2011	Chelsea	0	(0)
2006	→ Bournemouth (loan)	4	(0)
2007	→ Bournemouth (loan)	3	(0)
2007–2008	→ Scunthorpe United (loan)	34	(2)
2008–2009	→ Southampton (loan)	23	(0)
2009	→ Watford (loan)	19	(0)
2009	→ Coventry City (loan)	21	(0)
2010	→ Burnley (loan)	11	(1)
2010–2011	→ Burnley (loan)	40	(3)
2011–2015	Southampton	114	(2)
2015–2017	Swansea City	80	(2)
2017–2024	Burnley	184	(4)
Total		533	(14)

International career
2005	England U16	3	(0)
2005–2006	England U17	7	(0)
2006	England U18	1	(0)
2007–2008	England U19	14	(0)
2009	England U20	1	(0)
2008–2011	England U21	13	(0)
2012	Great Britain Olympic	4	(0)
2017	England	1	(0)
- * Club domestic league appearances and goals

Jack Frank Porteous Cork (born 25 June 1989) is an English professional football coach and former player who played as a defensive midfielder. He is currently a first-team coach at EFL Championship club Burnley.

Cork started off his career with Chelsea but between 2006 and 2011, he went on loan to a number of clubs, including Scunthorpe United where he was named player of the year. Without making an appearance for Chelsea, he signed permanently to Championship club Southampton in 2011 where he made over 100 appearances for them and helped them gain promotion to the Premier League by featuring in all their matches. Cork spent two and a half years with Premier League club Swansea City from January 2015 to July 2017 before his permanent move to Burnley where he featured in every match en route of the club qualifying to the UEFA Europa League. He spent six seasons with Burnley, one of which was a title winning EFL Championship campaign, before his contract expired in June 2024.

Cork featured for England from U16 in 2005 to U21 between 2008 and 2011, the Great Britain Olympic team at the 2012 Summer Olympics and once for the senior England national team.

== Early life ==
Cork was born in Carshalton, London on 25 June 1989. He is the son of former footballer and manager Alan Cork.

== Playing career ==
=== Chelsea ===
Cork joined the Chelsea youth system up age of nine, and captained both the club's youth and reserve teams. During the 2006–07 season, Cork twice went on loan to League One club Bournemouth. Cork was selected to go on Chelsea's pre-season tour of the United States in summer 2007. He made his first appearance for the first team against Club América on 14 July. He played out-of-position at left back for most of the tour.

Cork spent the 2007–08 season on loan at newly promoted Championship club Scunthorpe United. His first league goals came for Scunthorpe, both against Coventry City; in a 1–1 away draw on 27 November 2007 and in a 2–1 home victory on 1 March 2008. After 35 appearances, despite Scunthorpe's relegation from the Championship, he was voted the club's Player of the Year.

On 21 August 2008, Cork joined Championship club Southampton on loan until 1 January 2009. In January 2009, Cork joined Championship club Watford on loan until the end of the 2008–09 season. He scored his first goal for Watford on 24 January 2009 in a 4–3 victory over Crystal Palace in the fourth round of the FA Cup. Cork signed a new three-year contract with Chelsea on 21 August 2009 and immediately joined Championship club Coventry City on loan until the end of December 2009.

On 1 February 2010, Cork joined Premier League club Burnley on loan until the end of the 2009–10 season. He made his first appearance for Burnley in a 3–0 defeat away to Fulham on his Premier League debut. He then played in a 5–2 defeat against Aston Villa on 21 February 2010 and assisted Burnley's second goal. Cork scored his first goal for Burnley on 9 May 2010 in a 4–2 home win over Tottenham Hotspur, with a diving header to score Burnley's second to turn over a two-goal lead. His father revealed the day before in a local newspaper, the Lancashire Telegraph, that Cork was looking to leave Chelsea in the summer and was willing to drop down into the Championship in order to do so.

On 8 August 2010, Chelsea said that they would allow Cork to leave the club and were looking for offers of around £2 million. On 12 August, Cork re-joined Burnley on loan for the 2010–11 season. Cork scored a last minute winner at home to Derby County on 27 November, taking Burnley into the play-off positions.

=== Southampton ===
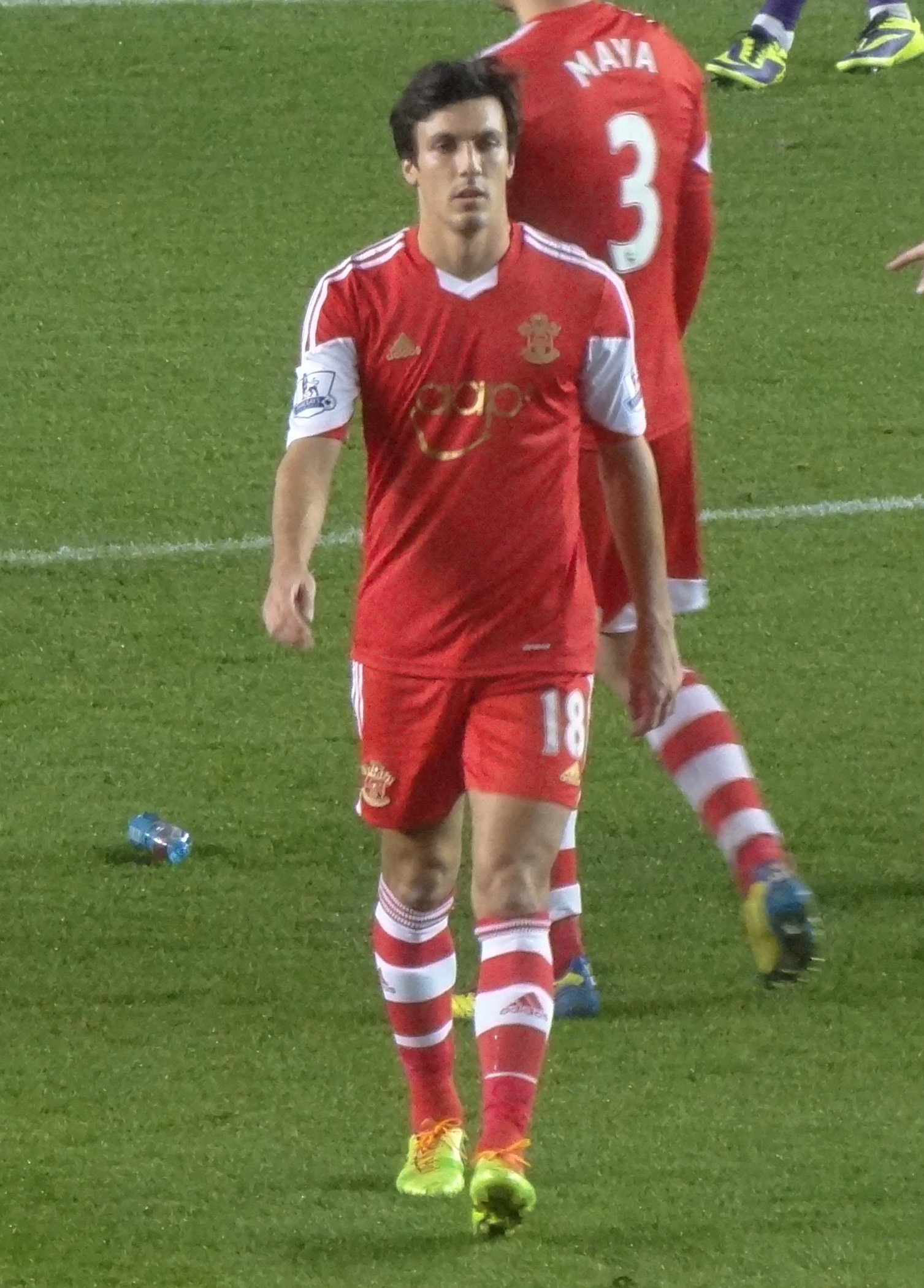
Cork playing for Southampton in 2013

On 7 July 2011, Cork signed for newly promoted Championship club Southampton, after they agreed an undisclosed fee with Chelsea. Cork ended the 2011–12 season as the only Southampton player who appeared in every league match, as the club earned promotion to the Premier League as runners-up in the Championship.

Cork missed Southampton's opening fixtures of the 2012–13 Premier League, due to an ankle injury, sustained against Bristol City in a friendly and a League Cup victory over Sheffield Wednesday. On 26 August 2014, he scored his first goal for Southampton in a 2–0 away victory over Millwall in the second round of the League Cup.

He scored his first league goal for the club in a 4–0 home win over Newcastle United on 13 September 2014 and his second and final league goal for the club came in an 8–0 home win over Sunderland on 18 October.

=== Swansea City ===
Cork signed for Southampton's Premier League rivals Swansea City on 30 January 2015 on a three-and-a-half-year contract, for a fee "believed to be in the region of £3 million". On 25 April 2015, he scored his first goal for Swansea in a 3–2 away win over Newcastle United.

Over a year after his first goal for the club, on 1 May 2016, he scored his second, with a 20-yard curling shot in a 3–1 home victory over Liverpool. This victory helped secure Swansea's Premier League status for the 2016–17 season.

=== Burnley ===
Cork returned to Premier League club Burnley on 11 July 2017 on a four-year contract, for fee reported to be in the region of £8 million, rising to £10 million with add-ons. He scored his first goal on his return to Burnley in an EFL Cup tie against Blackburn Rovers on 23 August 2017. His first Premier League goal for Burnley came against his former club Swansea City in a 2–0 win on 18 November. That goal ended a run of 43 appearances without a goal for the player.

On 16 August 2018, he scored the winning goal in Burnley's 1–0 victory over İstanbul Başakşehir in the Europa League qualifiers.

On 20 June 2022, following relegation to the Championship, Cork signed a new two-year contract with the club. On 7 April 2023, Burnley were promoted to the Premier League for the 2023–24 season, as Cork would return to the top-flight English division.

On 18 May 2024, it was announced that Cork would leave the club at the expiration of his contract following Burnley's immediate relegation back to the Championship, ending his seven-year tenure with the club.

== Coaching career ==
=== Burnley ===
On 3 October 2024, Burnley announced the return of Cork as an assistant manager/player for their Under-21s. "I missed it when I was away for a month or so and it's nice to be back in the environment and be back involved in football," Cork stated. On his role as a player/coach at youth levels, he noted, "I'm not sure how fit I'll be but maybe when the fixtures pile up ... maybe for 15 minutes or so, I can come on and play certain parts of the game to help that player see how someone with my experience would be able to cope in that role."

== International career ==
=== England ===
Cork has represented England at many youth levels, making his under-19 debut against the Czech Republic in May 2007. He captained the England U19 squad to make the 2008 UEFA European Under-19 Championship, and was part of the under-21 squad at the 2011 UEFA European Under-21 Championship.

On 7 November 2017, Cork was called into the England squad for friendly matches against Germany and Brazil. He made his debut on 10 November 2017 as an 86th-minute substitute in a 0–0 draw against Germany at Wembley Stadium.

=== Great Britain Olympic team ===
On 2 July 2012, Cork was named in Stuart Pearce's 18-man Great Britain squad for the 2012 Summer Olympics. He made his debut on 20 July in a 2–0 loss to Brazil in a pre-tournament friendly, coming on at half-time to replace Daniel Sturridge. He played as a substitute in each of Great Britain's three group matches, and was an unused substitute as the team were knocked out by South Korea in the quarter-final.

== Career statistics ==
=== Club ===
Appearances and goals by club, season and competition
Club	Season	League			FA Cup		League Cup		Other		Total	
Club	Season	Division	Apps	Goals	Apps	Goals	Apps	Goals	Apps	Goals	Apps	Goals
Chelsea	2006–07	Premier League	0	0	—		0	0	0	0	0	0
Chelsea	2007–08	Premier League	0	0	—		—		0	0	0	0
Chelsea	2008–09	Premier League	0	0	—		—		0	0	0	0
Chelsea	2009–10	Premier League	0	0	0	0	—		0	0	0	0
Chelsea	2010–11	Premier League	0	0	—		—		0	0	0	0
Chelsea	Total		0	0	0	0	0	0	0	0	0	0
Bournemouth (loan)	2006–07	League One	7	0	2	0	—		—		9	0
Scunthorpe United (loan)	2007–08	Championship	34	2	1	0	—		—		35	2
Southampton (loan)	2008–09	Championship	23	0	—		2	0	—		25	0
Watford (loan)	2008–09	Championship	19	0	2	1	—		—		21	1
Coventry City (loan)	2009–10	Championship	21	0	—		—		—		21	0
Burnley (loan)	2009–10	Premier League	11	1	—		—		—		11	1
Burnley (loan)	2010–11	Championship	40	3	3	0	3	0	—		46	3
Burnley (loan)	Total		51	4	3	0	3	0	—		57	4
Southampton	2011–12	Championship	46	0	1	0	2	0	—		49	0
Southampton	2012–13	Premier League	28	0	1	0	1	0	—		30	0
Southampton	2013–14	Premier League	28	0	2	0	3	0	—		33	0
Southampton	2014–15	Premier League	12	2	1	0	2	1	—		15	3
Southampton	Total		114	2	5	0	8	1	—		127	3
Swansea City	2014–15	Premier League	15	1	—		—		—		15	1
Swansea City	2015–16	Premier League	35	1	1	0	0	0	—		36	1
Swansea City	2016–17	Premier League	30	0	1	0	1	0	—		32	0
Swansea City	Total		80	2	2	0	1	0	—		83	2
Swansea City U23	2016–17	—			—		—		1 (Note: Appearance in EFL Trophy)	0	1	0
Burnley	2017–18	Premier League	38	2	1	0	2	1	—		41	3
Burnley	2018–19	Premier League	37	1	2	0	0	0	6 (Note: Appearances in UEFA Europa League)	2	45	3
Burnley	2019–20	Premier League	30	0	2	0	0	0	—		32	0
Burnley	2020–21	Premier League	16	0	2	0	0	0	—		18	0
Burnley	2021–22	Premier League	20	1	1	0	3	0	—		23	1
Burnley	2022–23	Championship	39	0	4	0	1	0	—		44	0
Burnley	2023–24	Premier League	4	0	0	0	2	0	—		6	0
Burnley	Total		184	4	12	0	8	1	6	2	210	7
Career total			533	14	27	1	22	2	7	2	589	19

=== International ===
Appearances and goals by national team and year
National team	Year	Apps	Goals
England	2017	1	0
Total		1	0

== Honours ==
Burnley

- EFL Championship: 2022–23

Individual

- Scunthorpe United Player of the Year: 2007–08
