= Jan-Paul Saeijs =

Dutch footballer

Personal information
- Full name: Jan-Paul Frederik Daniel Saeijs
- Date of birth: 20 June 1978 (age 48)
- Place of birth: The Hague, Netherlands
- Height: 1.90 m (6 ft 3 in)
- Position: Centre back

Youth career
- HBS Craeyenhout
- HVV
- 1997–1998: ADO Den Haag

Senior career*
Years	Team	Apps	(Gls)
1998–2006	ADO Den Haag	161	(12)
2006–2010	Roda JC	108	(7)
2009	→ Southampton (loan)	20	(2)
2010–2012	De Graafschap	28	(0)
2012–2015	HBS Craeyenhout	80	(39)
- * Club domestic league appearances and goals

Jan-Paul Frederik Daniel Saeijs (born 20 June 1978) is a Dutch former professional footballer who played as a defender.

== Career ==
Born in The Hague, Saeijs made his debut in professional football for ADO Den Haag in the 1998–99 season.

In January 2009, he joined Southampton on loan, with an option of making the deal permanent if Southampton were still in the Championship at the end of the 2008–09 season. He made his debut in a 1–0 victory over Barnsley on 10 January.

He scored his first two Southampton goals against Watford, a header and a 30-yard free kick.

On 10 June 2010 Saeijs signed with Eredivisie newcomer, De Graafschap. He signed a contract for 2 years. Saeijs announced his retirement from professional football in May 2012 and signed with Topklasse side HBS Craeyenhout from his home city The Hague. He retired from football altogether in June 2015.
