= Jack Saville =

English footballer

Personal information
- Full name: Jack William Saville
- Date of birth: 2 April 1991 (age 35)
- Place of birth: Camberley, England
- Positions: Centre back; left back

Youth career
- 2006: Reading
- 2007–2009: Chelsea

Senior career*
Years	Team	Apps	(Gls)
2009–2012	Southampton	0	(0)
2010	→ Stockport County (loan)	0	(0)
2011	→ Hayes & Yeading United (loan)	4	(0)
2011–2012	→ Barnet (loan)	6	(0)
2012–2015	Barnet	67	(1)
2013	→ Ebbsfleet United (loan)	15	(0)
2015–2016	Aldershot Town	32	(1)
2017	St Albans City	13	(0)
2017	Farnborough	10	(0)
Total		147	(2)
- * Club domestic league appearances and goals

Jack William Saville (born 2 April 1991) is an English former professional footballer who played as a defender.

== Club career ==
=== Southampton ===
Saville joined Chelsea's academy from Reading Under-14's and played over 20 games in Chelsea's 2007–08 youth side before being promoted into their reserve team squad. He spent four years at the club before joining Southampton from Chelsea's youth system in March 2009. Shortly after, he progressed through the club's youth system and reserves. Saville penned a three-year contract with Southampton in July 2010.

Later in the year, Saville joined Stockport County on a month loan on 4 November 2010. However, he was told by manager Paul Simpson to fight his way to the first team, only to leave the club after being given a compassionate leave without making an appearance.

On 11 August 2011, Saville joined Hayes & Yeading United on a three-month loan. He made his debut for the club, coming on as a 76th-minute substitute, in a 4–0 loss against Newport County on 16 August 2011. His performance led manager Nas Bashir impressed with his performance, quoting: "Saville did well when he came on and we are creating a good squad here with competition for places. The boys are aware that they keep the shirt if they play well, but if they do not then someone will come in and take their place." However, his loan spell with Hayes & Yeading United was soon cut and returned to his parent club.

=== Barnet ===
On 7 November 2011, Saville joined Barnet on loan for a month.

He made his first appearance for the club, coming on as a 65th-minute substitute against Southport on 12 November 2011, winning 2–1 in an FA Cup match. Saville made his first start for Barnet, starting the whole game and helped the club keep a clean sheet, in a 2–0 win against Bristol Rovers on 19 November 2011. Five days later on 24 November 2011, he extended his loan spell with Barnet until January. However, Saville missed four matches due to his injury concern and competition. He made his return to the starting line–up against Bristol Rovers on 2 January 2012 and set up the club's first goal of the game, as well as, keeping a clean sheet in a 2–0 win. Following this, Saville regained his first team place for the club in the next eight matches. With his loan spell at Barnet expiring, Crewe made a loan bid to sign the player. On 2 February 2012, Southampton terminated his contract, enabling him to join Barnet on a permanent basis. His first game after signing for the club on a permanent basis came in a 1–0 loss against Swindon Town in the Southern Section of Football League Trophy. This lasted until he suffered an injury and was substituted in the 49th minute during a 4–0 loss against Bradford City on 28 February 2012. As a result, Saville missed the next five matches for Barnet. He made his return to the starting line–up against Macclesfield Town on 23 March 2012 and helped the club keep a clean sheet, in a 0–0 draw. Following this, Saville rotated in and out of the starting line–up for the rest of the 2011–12 season and helped Barnet avoid relegation in The Football League for another season. At the end of the 2011–12 season, he went on to make twenty–one appearances in all competitions. Following this, Saville signed a contract extension with the club.

At the start of the 2012–13 season, Saville appeared in the first six matches of the season and only made four starts for Barnet. He then scored his first goal for the club, in a 3–1 defeat at home to Gillingham. However, Saville was then dropped to the substitute bench throughout the first half of the season. By the time he was loaned out, Saville made eight appearances for Barnet.

On 11 January 2013, Saville joined Ebbsfleet United on a month's loan. He made his debut for the club, starting the whole game, in a 1–0 loss against Woking on 13 January 2013. His first team runs in led to an extension until the end of the season. However, during a 4–1 loss against Wrexham on 5 March 2013, Saville suffered an injury and was substituted in the 33rd minute. After missing the next five matches, he returned to the first team from injury, coming on in the 77th minute in a 3–1 loss against Braintree Town on 1 April 2013. Following this, Saville then started five more matches later in the 2012–13 season. At the end of the 2012–13 season, he went on to make fifteen appearances in all competitions and returned to his parent club.

The start of the 2013–14 season saw Saville appearing in the first two league matches of the season before suffering a head injury and was substituted at half time, in a 0–0 draw against Tamworth on 13 August 2013. Although he recovered shortly after, Saville was dropped to the substitute bench for the next twelve matches, as well as, facing his own injury concern. On 5 October 2013, he made his return to the starting line–up and helped Barnet draw 1–1 against Welling United Saville then set up a goal for the club, in a 1–1 draw against Wrexham on 13 October 2013. He helped Barnet keep three consecutive clean sheets between 19 October 2013 and 12 November 2013. Following his return from injury, Saville continued to establish himself in the first team, playing in the centre–back position. Once again, he helped the club keep three consecutive clean sheets between 26 November 2013 and 21 December 2013. After serving a one match suspension, Saville made his return to the starting line–up against Luton Town on 1 January 2014, as Barnet lost 2–1. He then started in the next five matches, including three clean sheets. However, Saville suffered a hip injury that saw him missed for weeks. On 8 March 2014, he made his return from injury, starting the whole game, in a 1–0 loss against Gateshead. However, Saville found himself in and out of the starting line–up for the rest of the 2013–14 season, making three appearances. At the end of the 2013–14 season, he went on to make twenty–four appearances in all competitions. Following this, the club announced that Saville was being released, though he was invited back to the club for pre-season training. Saville was later offered a new one-year deal, and it was announced he would be staying with the Bees on 2 June 2014.

At the start of the 2014–15 season, Saville was featured four times in the first seven league matches of the season. During a 2–1 loss against Alfreton Town on 6 September 2014, he sustained ankle injury and was substituted in the 52nd minute. After being sidelined for a month, Saville made his return to the first team from injury against Macclesfield Town and played 71 minutes before being substituted, in a 2–1 loss on 7 October 2014. Following his return from injury, he initially found his playing time, coming from the substitute bench. But Saville regained his first team place, playing in the centre–back position. In the last game of the season against Gateshead, he came on as an 82nd-minute substitute and helped Barnet win 2–0 to seal the club's promotion back to League Two. At the end of the 2014–15 season, Saville went on to make twenty–six appearances in all competitions. Following this, he was released by Barnet upon expiry of his contract.

=== Aldershot Town ===
After leaving Barnet, Saville signed for Aldershot Town on 5 June 2015, signing a one-year contract.

He made his debut for the club, coming on as an 84th-minute substitute, in a 2–1 loss against Gateshead in the opening game of the season. From that moment on, Saville became a first team regular at Aldershot Town, forming a centre-back partnership with Omar Beckles for most of the season. He then scored his first goal for the club, scoring from a header, in a 2–0 win against Altrincham on 10 October 2015. However, Saville was plagued with injuries on three occasions throughout the 2015–16 season. At the end of the 2015–16 season, Saville went on to make twenty–five appearances and scoring once in all competitions. Following this, he was offered a new contract by Aldershot Town. He then signed a contract extension with the club, keeping him until 2017.

However, Saville's playing was restricted in the 2016–17 season, due to competitions in the centre–back position, as well as, his own injury concern. He was released by the club on 29 December 2016. By the time Saville left Aldershot Town, he made eight appearances in all competitions.

=== St Albans City/Farnborough ===
On 5 January 2017, Saville signed for National League South side St Albans City on an 18 month contract.

He made his debut for the club, starting a match and played 57 minutes, in a 2–2 draw against Maidenhead United on 7 January 2017. Since joining St Albans City, Saville quickly became a first team regular for the side, playing in the centre–back position. At the end of the 2016–17 season, he went on to make thirteen appearances in all competitions.

On 5 August 2017, Saville left St Albans City for Farnborough. He went on to make ten appearances before leaving the club two months later.

== Personal life ==
Saville is the older brother of fellow Chelsea youth product George Saville who represents Northern Ireland internationally. Their grandmother was from Enniskillen.

== Honours ==
Barnet

- Conference Premier champions: 2014–15
