= Southampton Leisure Holdings =

Southampton Leisure Holdings PLC was the parent company of Southampton Football Club Ltd and was listed on the Alternative Investment Market of the London Stock Exchange. The company was placed into administration on 2 April 2009.

== Subsidiaries ==
The wholly owned subsidiary companies of Southampton Leisure Holdings PLC were:

- Southampton Football Club Ltd
- St. Mary's Stadium Ltd
- St. Mary's SPV Ltd
- Southampton Insurance Services Ltd
- Southampton Mortgage & Financial Centre Ltd
- Saints Supporters Club Ltd
- Southampton Swaylife Ltd
- Secure Retirement Ltd
- Dell Estates Ltd
- St Michael's Street Homes (No. 1) Ltd
- Stadium 2000 Ltd
- Felix Broadcasting Ltd
- South City FM Ltd
- Forest FM Ltd

== History ==
On 30 June 2006, Rupert Lowe resigned as Chairman of Southampton Leisure Holdings, along with other directors Andrew Cowen, Guy Askham, Mike Richards and David Windsor-Clive.

On 26 February 2007, Michael Wilde offered his resignation as a Director effective from 28 February 2007 as a result of his failure to bring in new investment. The resignation was accepted by the board as being in the best interests of the company.

On 27 April 2007, it was rumoured that Paul Allen, the American entrepreneur who formed Microsoft with Bill Gates, may launch a takeover bid for the club. An apparent close source said "he believes there is long term investment value in UK Soccer. Southampton is a sleeping giant, a family-supported club with traditional values, and we see the value in taking the brand global."

== Administration ==
Shares in the company were suspended from trading on 1 April 2009, when the company announced that it was in negotiations to secure additional financing to ensure that it was able to continue trading.

On 2 April 2009, Southampton Leisure Holdings declared administration after it failed to gain investment to last for the next financial year. Administrators Mark Fry and David Hudson, partners of Begbies Traynor, took over control of the parent company and all assets until a new owner could be found.

On 27 July 2009, DMWSL 613 Limited, a company controlled by Markus Liebherr bought Southampton Football Club and all its assets form the administrator. On 2 October, the listing of the shares for Southampton Leisure Holdings was cancelled.

The company was placed in Creditors' Voluntary Liquidation on 22 February 2010.
