= Michael Wilde =

English businessman (born 1952)

- Born: 1952 (age 73–74); Wirral, Cheshire, England
- Education: Wirral Grammar School for Boys
- Alma mater: University of Westminster; University of Sheffield
- Occupation: Businessman
- Known for: Chairman of Southampton F.C. (2006–2007, 2008–2009)
- Notable work: Executive producer of Roar
- Title: Former Chairman, Southampton F.C.
- Awards: Best Small Housebuilder, What House? Awards (2006); Grand Jury Prize (Screenplay), Rhode Island International Film Festival; Best Cinematography, Aspen Shortsfest

Michael Wilde (born 1952) is an English businessman who became Chairman of Southampton Football Club for two periods after the club's relegation from the Premiership, resigning on 2 April 2009, the day after the club's holding company, Southampton Leisure Holdings Plc, went into administration.

== Education and early career ==
He was born on the Wirral, Cheshire in 1952. Wilde attended Wirral Grammar School before going to the University of Westminster in 1973 where he obtained a first degree in Urban Estate Management before going on to do his master's degree in Town and Regional Planning at Sheffield University. He later went on to work in estate agency, planning consultancy and in local government with Sheffield City Council, before going to Singapore in 1978. He is a Fellow of the Royal Institution of Chartered Surveyors and became a member of the Royal Town Planning Institute in 1981. He has authored many papers on housing issues and was a senior lecturer in real estate economics and town planning at the National University of Singapore from 1978 to 1983. During his time in Singapore he also acted as an advisor to the government's Housing Development Board and Urban Redevelopment Authority becoming a member of both the Singapore Institute of Planners and the Singapore Institute of Surveyors and Valuers.

== Southampton F.C. ==
He moved to Hampshire in 1985 upon his return from Singapore and became a major sponsor of a number of Southampton players including Kevin Davies, Dan Petrescu and Graeme Le Saux before acquiring a 10% stake in the club from existing Director Paul Thompson, the former West Bromwich Albion Chairman in February 2006. He went on to purchase further shares over the following months soon becoming the club's largest individual shareholder.

His first period as chairman was from 30 June 2006 to February 2007, gaining his position following pressure on Rupert Lowe to resign, the club's previouschairman of ten years. Shortly after his arrival as chairman, the club's director of football, Sir Clive Woodward left by mutual agreement as the club went about trying to restructure its finances. A number of new players were brought into a depleted squad including Rudi Skacel, Kelvin Davis, Jermaine Wright, Bradley Wright-Phillips, and Iñigo Idiakez, but despite the Saints being in a play-off position in the championship under manager, George Burley, Wilde resigned, reportedly due to a lack of promised investment from outside investors.

During his tenure Wilde also signed Academy player Gareth Bale to his first professional contract, who quickly became a first team regular. Bale was eventually sold to Tottenham Hotspur in a package potentially worth £10m to the club. Bale subsequently signed for Spanish club Real Madrid for a then world record fee of £85.3 million (€100 million).

Following a long period of boardroom upheaval in the club after Wilde's initial departure, and after narrowly avoiding relegation to League One, Wilde and his earlier rival, Rupert Lowe, finally demanded an EGM to remove chairman Leon Crouch and on 15 May 2008, Crouch and three other directors resigned from the board. Wilde resumed his position as chairman of the football club whilst Lowe became chairman of the holding company, Southampton Leisure Holdings Plc.

Upon becoming chairman again, Jan Poortvliet, who represented the Netherlands in the Final of the 1978 FIFA World Cup in Argentina, was appointed head coach to work with what was a very young squad for the 2008/9 season. Whilst showing promise the team struggled to remain consistent in the Championship, and when the club were deducted 10 points as a result of its holding company going into administration, relegation to League One became inevitable.

Wilde has been based in Jersey since February 2006 and in March 2007 he became the main sponsor of the Jersey Football Association (JFA) and played a significant part in bringing the Jersey F.A. International Small Nations Tournament to the island in November 2008.

== Other business career ==
Whilst in Singapore, Wilde founded Contact Communication Services in 1983, a telecommunications company specialising in high-speed data communications and offering low-cost telex relay services throughout South-East Asia. The company quickly expanded through the establishment of operational offices in Hong Kong, East and West Malaysia, Thailand, Indonesia and Australia. Wilde eventually exited the company through a sale to European Telecommunication giants, the Great Northern Telegraph Company of Copenhagen in 1988.

Upon returning to the UK, Wilde founded Merlion Housing Association in 1990, a specialist provider of privately funded affordable housing. He created and developed a shared equity model for the provision of Housing Association Grant free affordable housing and has been instrumental in this form of tenure becoming a key tool of affordable housing policy in the United Kingdom. The association has provided homes to nearly 2,000 individuals and families in housing need since its incorporation and was the only privately funded Housing Association to receive funds under the government's £200 million Starter Homes Initiative in 2001 aimed at providing key worker homes for, amongst others, teachers, nurses and the police.

Following the success of Merlion, Wilde went on to form a house building company, Infinity Homes Ltd, in partnership with its chief executive, Alistair Baker and in 2006 the company won the prestigious "Best Small Housebuilder" Gold Award in the Daily Telegraph sponsored What House? Awards, often referred to as the Oscars of the house building industry. Wilde acted as Non-Executive Chairman of the company until it ceased trading in 2008 due to the economic downturn. The holding company of Infinity Homes Ltd was, as a result, wound up in June 2011. Merlion Housing Association, however, continues to provide affordable housing to low income families, working closely with many Local Authorities throughout the United Kingdom

Wilde also co-founded Wildcard Films Ltd in April 2009 and was its chairman until February 2011. He was executive producer of the company's critically acclaimed short film "Roar", starring Russell Tovey, Tom Burke and Jodie Whittaker, which has won awards at several major international festivals, including the Grand Jury Prize for Best Screenplay at the Rhode Island International Film Festival, and Winner for Best Cinematography at the Aspen Shortsfest.

Although retaining strong links to the North-West, Wilde acquired Cardington House, a landmark property in Saint Aubin, Jersey in 2006 and after an extensive refurbishment programme opened it as a luxury boutique hotel. He is also joint founder of online retailer The Tight Spot Limited.

In early 2014, Wilde was linked to a possible takeover of Tranmere Rovers Football Club but later withdrew following a period of due diligence.
