= Guly do Prado =

Brazilian footballer (born 1981)

Personal information
- Full name: Guilherme do Prado Raymundo
- Date of birth: 31 December 1981 (age 44)
- Place of birth: Campinas, Brazil
- Height: 1.89 m (6 ft 2 in)
- Position: Striker

Senior career*
Years	Team	Apps	(Gls)
2002	Portuguesa Santista	22	(7)
2002–2003	Catania	4	(0)
2003–2005	Perugia	34	(4)
2005–2008	Fiorentina	0	(0)
2007–2008	→ Spezia (loan)	32	(4)
2008	→ Mantova (loan)	14	(2)
2008–2009	Pro Patria	14	(7)
2009–2011	Cesena	34	(9)
2010–2011	→ Southampton (loan)	17	(6)
2011–2014	Southampton	86	(13)
2015	Chicago Fire	15	(0)
2016	Ituano	9	(0)
2016	→ Botafogo FC (loan)	0	(0)
2017	Luverdense EC	13	(1)
2018	XV de Piracicaba	0	(0)
2019	Grêmio Osasco	0	(0)
2019	Caldense	1	(0)
- * Club domestic league appearances and goals

Guilherme "Guly" do Prado Raymundo (born 31 December 1981) is a Brazilian former professional footballer who played as a striker.

== Club career ==
=== Early career and Italy ===
Do Prado started his career at Portuguesa Santista. He was later signed by Serie B club Catania in August 2002, making his debut on 31 August in a game against Siena. He was later signed by Perugia (at that time belonging to Luciano Gaucci, who was also the majority shareholder of Catania), where he had the chance to make his debut in the Italian top flight.

In 2005, following the cancellation of Perugia from Italian football, he found himself without a club, being then signed by Fiorentina. However, due to a career-threatening injury, he never played a single match for the Viola, and was subsequently loaned out twice, to Serie B clubs Spezia (from January to December 2007) and Mantova (from January to June 2008).

In July 2008, Do Prado agreed to leave Fiorentina by mutual consent. In September 2008, he initially agreed a contract with Messina in the Serie D, but later renounced to join the Sicilian side and instead accepted an offer from Pro Patria of Lega Pro Prima Divisione. In the 2009 summer window, he joined newly promoted Serie B outfit Cesena and was part of the side that finished as runners-up, thus gaining promotion to Serie A.

=== Southampton ===
On 23 August 2010, Southampton signed Do Prado on a five-month loan deal until January with an option to make the deal permanent when the next transfer window opens at the turn of the year. He made his début in a 4–0 victory away at Bristol Rovers, replacing Morgan Schneiderlin in the 84th minute. His first goal came in a 1–1 draw away at Yeovil Town. do Prado was then named man of the match in the home game against Tranmere Rovers by setting up a goal and showing unique skill to control the game. He scored his second goal in a 4–1 victory against Peterborough United. He grabbed a brace in a 4–0 win over Exeter City. He then scored a match later in their 3–1 victory over Dagenham & Redbridge. He then made it four goals in 8 days by scoring a thirty-yard piledriver in the FA Cup at home to Premier League side Blackpool to win 2–0. His run of form continued with another goal in Southampton's 6–0 victory against Oldham Athletic.

He signed permanently on 20 January 2011 on a two-and-a-half-year deal. His first goal since making the move permanent came in a 2–0 victory over Charlton Athletic. His 10th goal of the season came in a 1–0 victory over Bristol Rovers. His first goal of the 2011–12 season came in a 1–0 victory over Millwall. He scored a brace in a 3–0 victory against Middlesbrough. He netted another brace in a 2–0 victory over Crystal Palace. This brought his goal tally up to 10 for the season. He finished the campaign with 11 goals as the Saints were promoted to the Premier League.

It was announced on 15 July 2012 that Southampton had extended his contract for a further year, until Summer 2014. He made his first Premier League appearance on the opening day of the 2012–13 season in a 3–2 defeat at Manchester City. On 17 May 2014, Southampton announced that Do Prado would be released, after four years with the club.

=== Chicago Fire ===
On 6 January 2015 Do Prado signed with the MLS club Chicago Fire.

On 4 August 2015 it was announced that the Chicago Fire and Do Prado had mutually agreed to part ways.

=== Return to Brazil ===
On 2 February 2016, it was confirmed that Do Prado had signed for Ituano FC.

== Honours ==
Perugia

- UEFA Intertoto Cup: 2003

Southampton

- Football League One runners-up: 2010–11
- Football League Championship runners-up: 2011–12
