= Kelvin Davis (footballer) =

English footballer (born 1976)

Personal information
- Full name: Kelvin Geoffrey Davis
- Date of birth: 29 September 1976 (age 50)
- Place of birth: Bedford, England
- Height: 6 ft 1 in (1.85 m)
- Position: Goalkeeper

Team information
- Current team: Hednesford Town (manager)

Youth career
- 1991–1994: Luton Town

Senior career*
Years	Team	Apps	(Gls)
1994–1999	Luton Town	91	(0)
1994	→ Torquay United (loan)	2	(0)
1997	→ Hartlepool United (loan)	2	(0)
1999–2003	Wimbledon	131	(0)
2003–2005	Ipswich Town	88	(0)
2005–2006	Sunderland	33	(0)
2006–2016	Southampton	271	(0)
Total		618	(0)

International career
1995–1996	England U21	3	(0)

Managerial career
- 2018: Southampton (caretaker)
- 2024–2025: Eastleigh
- 2026–: Hednesford Town
- * Club domestic league appearances and goals

Kelvin Geoffrey Davis (born 29 September 1976) is an English professional football manager and former footballer who is the manager of National League North club Hednesford Town.

Davis played as a goalkeeper. He began his career with Luton Town as a youth player in 1991 and remained there until 1999. Davis later played for Wimbledon, Ipswich Town and Sunderland before moving to Southampton in 2006.

Davis was team captain of Southampton from 2009 to 2012, after which he became club captain. From July 2016 to December 2017, Davis had been working as part of the support staff at Southampton. On 29 December 2017, Davis became Senior First Team coach following the resignation of Eric Black the previous week until parting ways with Southampton in 2022.

== Club career ==
=== Early career ===
Davis was born in Bedford, Bedfordshire and started his career as a trainee with Luton Town, turning professional in July 1994. He joined Torquay United on loan in September 1994 as cover for the injured Ashley Bayes, making his debut in the 3–3 draw at home to Colchester United on 17 September. He also played in the 2–1 defeat at home to Barnet the following week before returning to Luton. He had a further loan spell, with Hartlepool United in August 1997. He joined Wimbledon in July 1999 for a fee of £600,000.

=== Ipswich Town ===
Davis joined Ipswich Town on a free transfer in July 2003. He quickly became the first-choice goalkeeper at Ipswich, making 45 appearances during his first season at the club. He kept his place in the team the following season. His form during the season earned him a place of the 2004–05 PFA Championship Team of the Year, whilst also helping steer Ipswich to third in the table.

=== Sunderland ===
Davis joined Sunderland in June 2005 for a fee of £1.25 million, and played in most of their Premier League games in the 2005–06 season, as Sunderland were relegated.

=== Southampton ===
In an attempt to rebuild his career after his difficult spell at Sunderland, Davis joined Southampton in July 2006 for a fee reported to be around £2 million. He linked up with former goalkeeping coach Malcolm Webster, who coached him during his spell at Ipswich. At Southampton, he was first choice goalkeeper for most of the 2006–07 season until a three-match ban relegated him to the bench where he remained after the return of Bartosz Białkowski. He was suspended for three games after kicking out at Stoke City's striker Jon Parkin on 10 March 2007.

His form for Saints in the first half of the 2008–09 season was impressive, despite the club's poor form. Southampton fans voted Davis player of the month three times in the first five months of the season on the club's official website.

On 9 July 2009, Davis turned down the opportunity to sign for then Premier League side West Ham United, instead signing a new three-year contract with Southampton which meant that he would remain at Southampton until May 2012. On 8 August 2009, he saved an Alan Dunne penalty in a 1–1 draw with Millwall. He was voted in the League one PFA team of year in 2009–10 season after a string of outstanding performances. He was again named in the League One Team of the Year for the 2010–11 season. On 23 November 2010, he saved a Chris Wood penalty in a 0–0 draw with Brighton & Hove Albion.

On 28 July 2011, Davis signed a new deal with Saints to keep him at the club until 2014. On 3 March 2012, Kelvin Davis put in a superb performance between the sticks against a rampant Leeds United to help secure a clean sheet, and one-nil win, for Southampton against the Yorkshire club at Elland Road. The performance earned the 35-year-old a place in the Championship Team of the Week.

He was named in the Championship Team of the Year for the 2011–12 season, meaning he had been named in a team of the year for three consecutive years. He saved a David Silva penalty on the opening day of the 2012–13 season against Manchester City, but this could not help the club from being beaten 3–2. He saved a Robin van Persie penalty in a game against Manchester United, but once again the club were beaten 3–2.

On 7 March 2013, Davis signed a new contract with Southampton, keeping him at the club until 2016.

He made his 300th appearance for the club on the final day of the 2014–15 season.

==== Testimonial ====
On 17 May 2016, a special testimonial match in recognition of his 10 years' service to Southampton was held in his honour. The fixture organised by Davis's testimonial committee was played two days after the close of the 2015–16 season and featured the current Saints side and a selection of players that took part in the 2010–11 and 2011–12 seasons in which Southampton won back-to-back promotions. His favoured charity, the Southampton-based Liver and Pancreatic Cancer Research & Development Charity, was a key beneficiary from money raised on the night.

== Coaching career ==
On 13 July 2016, Davis was appointed as Football Development Executive at Southampton to provide support to the players in the first team. On 29 December 2017 Davis was appointed as senior first team coach following the resignation of Eric Black.

On 3 December 2018, he was placed in temporary charge of the first team, following the dismissal of manager Mark Hughes.

On 25 May 2022, Southampton parted ways with Davis after confirming a change within the coaching team.

=== Eastleigh ===
On 19 February 2024, Davis was appointed manager of National League side Eastleigh. Following the conclusion of the 2023–24 season, Davis signed a new three-year contract. On 20 September 2025, Eastleigh parted company with Davis.

=== Hednesford Town ===
On 11 February 2026, Davis was appointed manager of Northern Premier League side Hednesford Town.

== Career statistics ==
=== Club ===
Appearances and goals by club, season and competition
Club	Season	Division	League		FA Cup		League Cup		Other		Total	
Club	Season	Division	Apps	Goals	Apps	Goals	Apps	Goals	Apps	Goals	Apps	Goals
Luton Town	1994–95	First Division	18	0	0	0	0	0	4	0	22	0
Luton Town	1995–96	First Division	0	0	0	0	0	0	—		0	0
Luton Town	1996–97	Second Division	0	0	0	0	0	0	0	0	0	0
Luton Town	1997–98	Second Division	29	0	0	0	0	0	1	0	30	0
Luton Town	1998–99	Second Division	44	0	2	0	7	0	—		53	0
Luton Town	Total		91	0	2	0	7	0	5	0	105	0
Torquay United (loan)	1994–95	Third Division	2	0	0	0	1	0	1	0	4	0
Hartlepool United (loan)	1997–98	Third Division	2	0	0	0	1	0	—		3	0
Wimbledon	1999–2000	Premier League	0	0	0	0	0	0	—		0	0
Wimbledon	2000–01	First Division	45	0	6	0	4	0	—		54	0
Wimbledon	2001–02	First Division	40	0	0	0	0	0	—		40	0
Wimbledon	2002–03	First Division	46	0	2	0	3	0	—		51	0
Wimbledon	Total		131	0	8	0	7	0	—		146	0
Ipswich Town	2003–04	First Division	45	0	2	0	2	0	2	0	51	0
Ipswich Town	2004–05	Championship	39	0	1	0	0	0	2	0	42	0
Ipswich Town	Total		84	0	3	0	2	0	4	0	93	0
Sunderland	2005–06	Premier League	33	0	2	0	0	0	—		35	0
Southampton	2006–07	Championship	38	0	2	0	3	0	1	0	44	0
Southampton	2007–08	Championship	35	0	3	0	0	0	—		38	0
Southampton	2008–09	Championship	46	0	1	0	0	0	—		47	0
Southampton	2009–10	League One	40	0	4	0	2	0	4	0	50	0
Southampton	2010–11	League One	46	0	1	0	2	0	1	0	50	0
Southampton	2011–12	Championship	46	0	0	0	0	0	—		46	0
Southampton	2012–13	Premier League	10	0	0	0	1	0	—		11	0
Southampton	2013–14	Premier League	2	0	3	0	3	0	—		8	0
Southampton	2014–15	Premier League	7	0	0	0	0	0	—		7	0
Southampton	2015–16	Premier League	1	0	0	0	0	0	0	0	1	0
Southampton	Total		271	0	11	0	7	0	6	0	301	0
Career total			613	0	26	0	28	0	46	0	687	0

=== Managerial ===
As of match played 20 September 2025

Managerial record by team and tenure
Team	From	To	Record					Ref.
Team	From	To	P	W	D	L	Win %	Ref.
Southampton (caretaker)	3 December 2018	6 December 2018	1	0	0	1	0.0	
Eastleigh	19 February 2024	20 September 2025	73	26	20	27	35.6	
Total			74	26	20	28	35.1	

== Honours ==
Player

Southampton

- Football League Championship runner-up: 2011–12
- Football League One runner-up: 2010–11
- Football League Trophy: 2009–10

Manager

Hednesford Town

- Northern Premier League Play Offs: 2025–26

Individual

- PFA Team of the Year: 2004–05 Championship, 2009–10 League One, 2010–11 League One, 2011–12 Championship
- Ipswich Town Players' Player of the Year: 2004–05
- Southampton Player of the Season: 2008–09
