= Igor Martínez =

Spanish footballer

Personal information
- Full name: Igor Martínez Caseras
- Date of birth: 19 July 1989 (age 37)
- Place of birth: Vitoria, Spain
- Height: 1.70 m (5 ft 7 in)
- Position: Attacking midfielder

Youth career
- Alavés

Senior career*
Years	Team	Apps	(Gls)
2007–2010	Alavés	87	(12)
2010–2012	Bilbao Athletic	31	(2)
2010–2013	Athletic Bilbao	13	(0)
2013–2015	Mirandés	67	(4)
2015–2017	Lugo	32	(2)
2017–2018	Mirandés	29	(1)
2018–2019	Melilla	36	(1)
2019–2020	Linense	5	(0)
Total		300	(22)

International career
2008	Spain U19	2	(0)
- * Club domestic league appearances and goals

Igor Martínez Caseras (born 19 July 1989) is a Spanish former professional footballer who played mainly as an attacking midfielder.

== Club career ==
Martínez was born in Vitoria-Gasteiz, Álava. After beginning his career at his hometown club Deportivo Alavés, in the Segunda División and Segunda División B, he moved to Basque neighbours Athletic Bilbao on 26 May 2010, for €200,000 and a three-year contract; he was initially assigned to the reserves also in the third tier.

On 18 September 2010, Martínez made his official debut with the first team, starting and playing 70 minutes in a 2–2 away draw against Sporting de Gijón. He only totalled ten La Liga matches in his first two seasons, however.

Martínez scored his only goal for Athletic on 30 August 2012, in a game at HJK Helsinki in the play-off round of the UEFA Europa League, closing the 3–3 draw (9–3 aggregate win). Released in June 2013, he resumed his career in the second division with CD Mirandés and CD Lugo.

Subsequently, Martínez represented Mirandés, UD Melilla and Real Balompédica Linense, with all the sides competing in the third tier. He announced his retirement on 6 October 2020 aged 31, due to a foot injury.
