= Adam Lallana =

English footballer (born 1988)

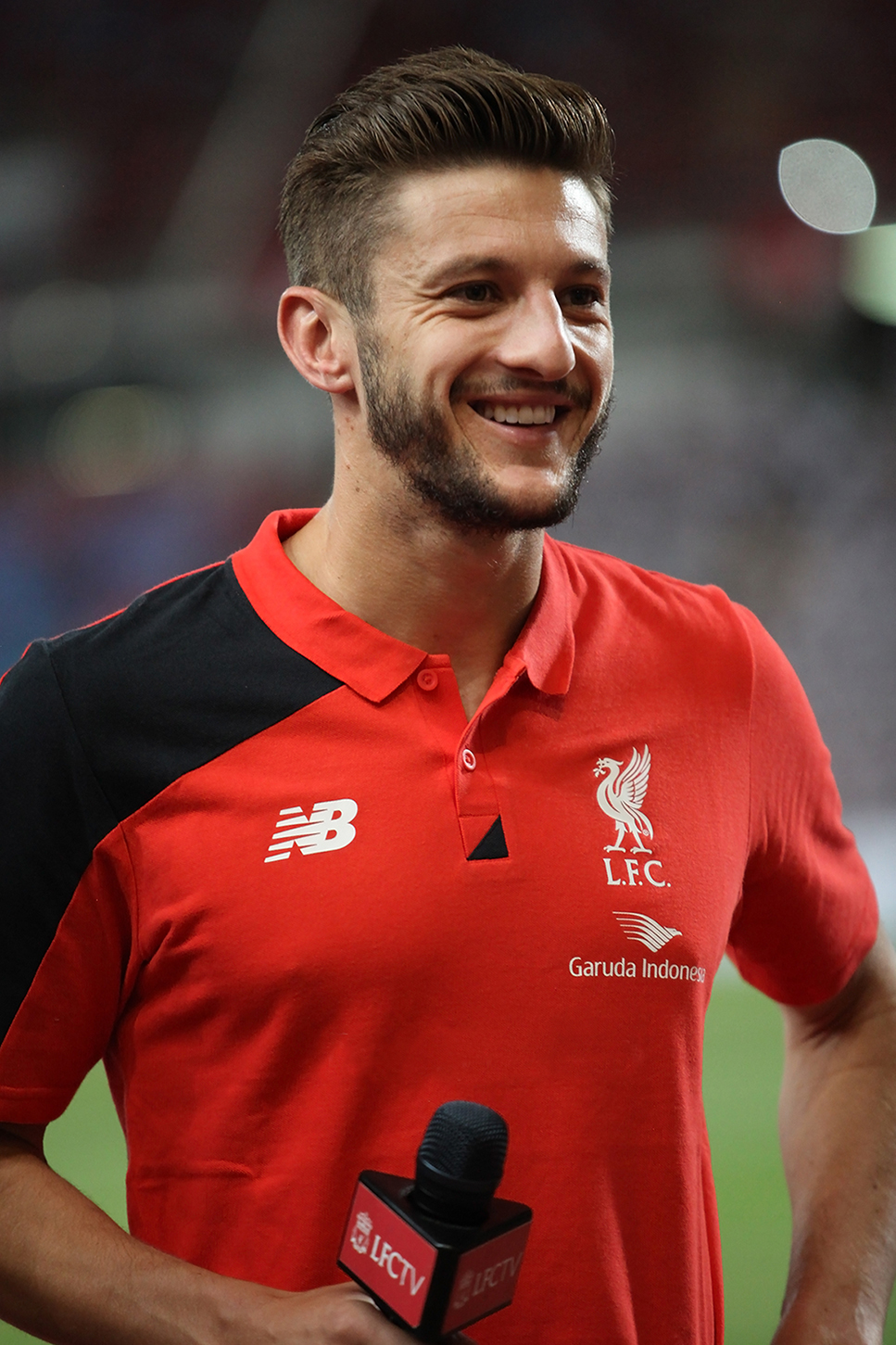
- Lallana with Liverpool in 2015

Personal information
- Full name: Adam David Lallana
- Date of birth: 10 May 1988 (age 38)
- Place of birth: St Albans, Hertfordshire, England
- Height: 5 ft 8 in (1.72 m)
- Position: Attacking midfielder

Youth career
- –2000: Bournemouth
- 2000–2006: Southampton

Senior career*
Years	Team	Apps	(Gls)
2006–2014	Southampton	235	(48)
2007	→ Bournemouth (loan)	3	(0)
2014–2020	Liverpool	128	(18)
2020–2024	Brighton & Hove Albion	95	(3)
2024–2025	Southampton	14	(0)
Total		475	(69)

International career
2006	England U18	2	(1)
2006	England U19	2	(0)
2008	England U21	1	(0)
2013–2018	England	34	(3)
- * Club domestic league appearances and goals

Adam David Lallana (/ləˈlɑːnə/ lə-LAH-nə; born 10 May 1988) is an English professional football coach and former player who played as an attacking midfielder. He is currently manager of Southampton Under-21s.

Lallana began his youth career with Bournemouth before transferring to Southampton in 2000, where he developed in their academy and became a professional in 2006. After a brief loan back to Bournemouth, he broke into Southampton's first team as they earned two consecutive promotions to rise from League One to the Premier League, and became captain in 2012. After two seasons in the top flight and an international breakthrough, he joined Liverpool for £25 million in July 2014. With Liverpool he won the 2018–19 UEFA Champions League and the 2019–20 Premier League. In 2020, he joined Brighton & Hove Albion on a free transfer, playing four seasons in the Premier League. He retired in 2025, after one final season at Southampton.

After his senior international debut in 2013, Lallana made 34 appearances for England. He scored three goals and represented his country at the 2014 FIFA World Cup and UEFA Euro 2016.

== Early life ==
Lallana was born in St Albans, Hertfordshire, but moved to the Iford area of Bournemouth, Dorset, when he was five years old. He attended Corpus Christi School followed by St Peter's Catholic School. As a child, Lallana supported Everton, like his father. He is of Spanish descent; his paternal grandfather is from Madrid.

== Club career ==
=== Southampton ===
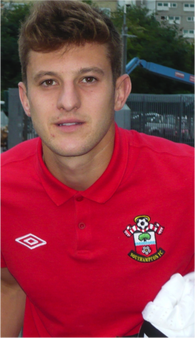
Lallana in 2012

Lallana was a member of the AFC Bournemouth Centre of Excellence, where he was spotted by a talent scout from Southampton. He joined the Premier League club's academy as a 12-year-old in September 2000. Southampton paid £3,000 compensation to Bournemouth with further payments of £5,000 and £10,000 when he signed scholarship and professional contracts respectively.

Lallana was involved in Southampton's FA Youth Cup squads of 2004–05 and 2005–06, when they reached the final and semi-final respectively.

Lallana joined the first team squad in July 2006, making his debut on 23 August 2006, in a 5–2 victory over Yeovil Town, in the League Cup. On 31 October 2006 he signed a new contract to keep him at Southampton until December 2009. On 9 October 2007 he joined Bournemouth on loan for one month. On 28 April 2008, Lallana scored his first professional goal for Southampton against West Bromwich Albion in a crucial Championship match, with a well-placed finish into the bottom left corner.

He became a regular in the first team at the start of the 2008–09 season. On 29 August 2008, he signed a new three-year contract with Southampton.

On 28 March 2010, he scored as Southampton beat Carlisle United 4–1 in the 2010 Football League Trophy final. He finished the 2009–10 season with a total of twenty goals in all competitions, netting his 20th on the final day of the season against Southend United. This made him the first Southampton midfielder to score twenty goals in a season since Matt Le Tissier's 30 in the 1994–95 season.

On 7 January 2011, Lallana signed a new contract with Southampton which would expire in the summer of 2015. He was named in the League One PFA Team of the Year after scoring 11 goals in the 2010–11 season as Southampton won promotion from League One, finishing three points behind winners Brighton & Hove Albion.

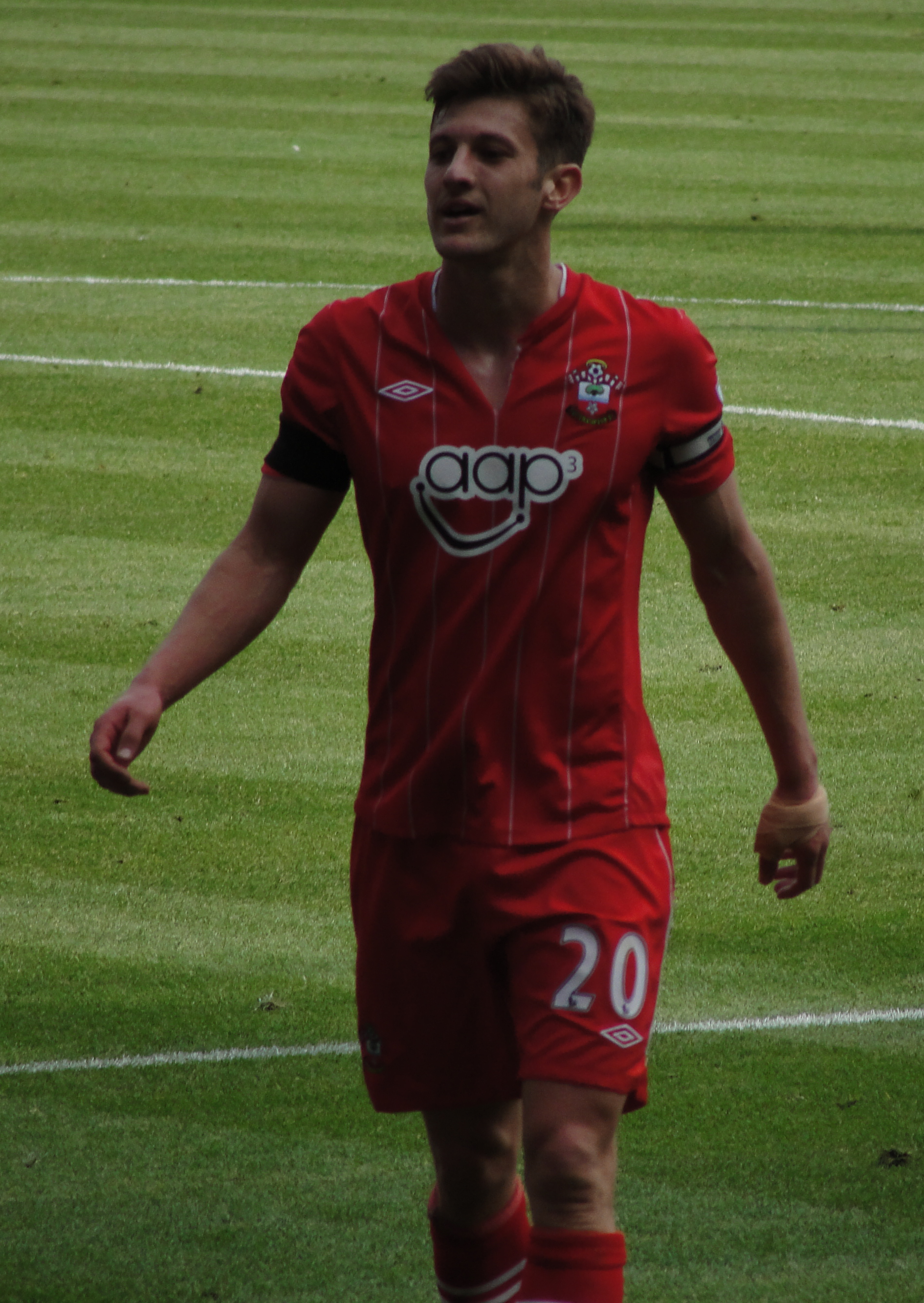
Lallana playing for Southampton in 2013

He then scored on the opening day of the 2011–12 season, a 3–1 victory over Leeds United at St Mary's Stadium which broke a 12-year hoodoo of Southampton not winning on the opening day and secured a record-breaking seventh consecutive league win. He then scored twice in a 5–2 victory at Ipswich Town. His 150th start for the club came in a 1–1 draw at south coast rivals Portsmouth. His tenth goal of the season came in a 4–0 victory over Derby County. He then scored two goals in a 2–0 victory over Barnsley. He was nominated for the Southampton Player of the Year award but lost out to teammate Rickie Lambert. Along with Lambert and Kelvin Davis, he was one of three Southampton players named in the Championship PFA Team of the Year for the 2011–12 season. He scored on the final day of the campaign to finish with 13 goals, 11 of which came in the league, as Southampton clinched a second consecutive promotion.

He made his first Premier League appearance on the opening day of the 2012–13 season, setting up a goal and wearing the captain's armband in a 3–2 defeat against 2011–12 champions Manchester City. He scored his first Premier League goal in a 4–1 defeat away to West Ham United. His second goal of the season came on 25 November, as he opened the scoring in a 2–0 home win against Newcastle United. The 50th goal of his career came in a 2–0 victory at Reading. On 11 April 2013, Lallana signed a new five-year contract with Southampton.

In Southampton's 4–1 Premier League victory over Hull City on 9 November 2013, Lallana started with the ball 30 yards from goal and dribbled his way past five players into the left-hand side of the 18-yard box, before slotting it past Hull goalkeeper Steve Harper. On 18 April 2014, he was shortlisted for the PFA Players' Player of the Year award, losing to Liverpool striker Luis Suárez. On 27 April 2014, he was named alongside teammate Luke Shaw in the PFA Team of the Year. On 6 May, he was voted both the Southampton Players' Player and Fans' Player of the year, while his solo goal against Hull City won the club's goal of the season award.

=== Liverpool ===
==== 2014–2016 ====
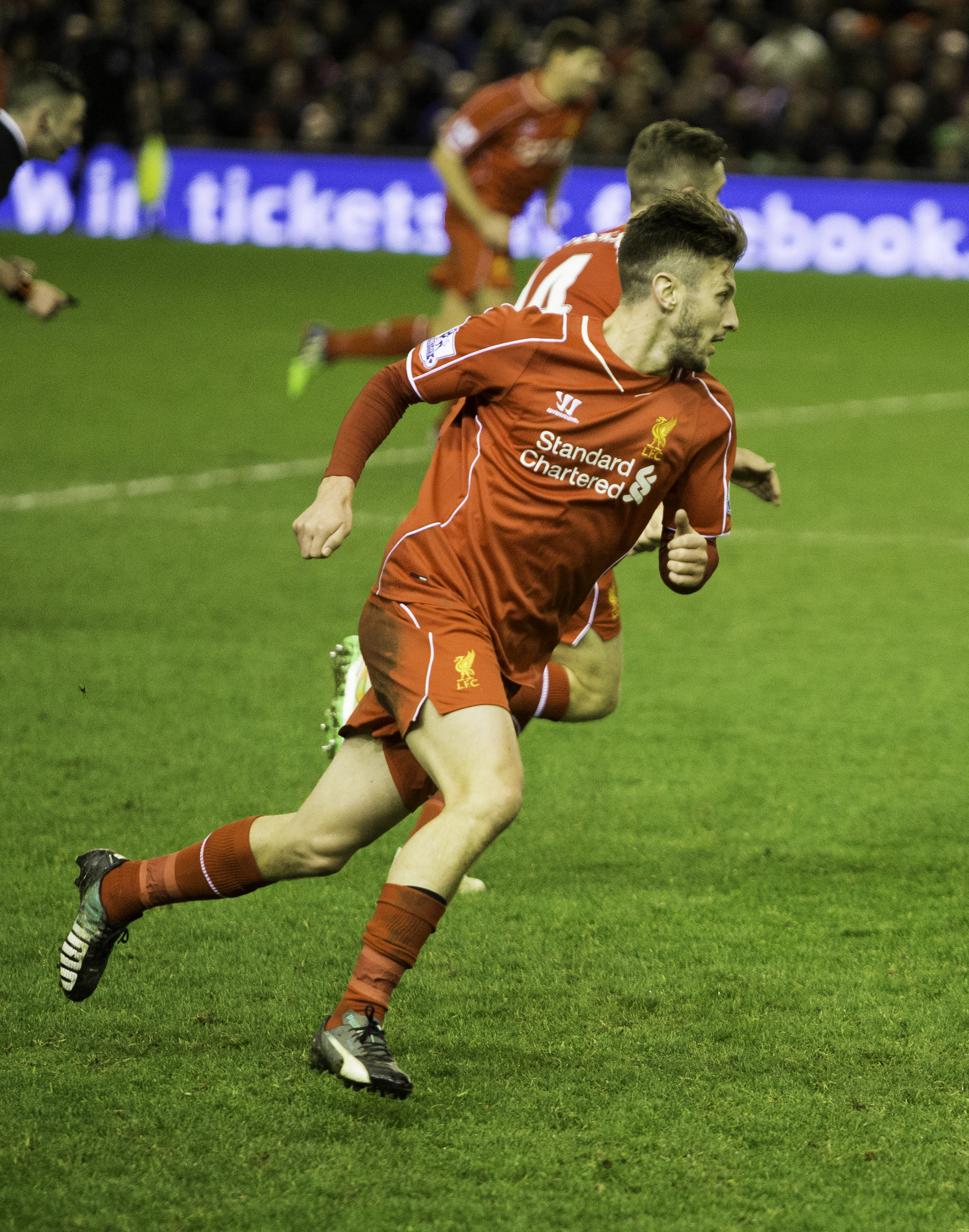
Lallana playing for Liverpool in 2014

Prior to the 2014 FIFA World Cup, Lallana was subject to interest from Premier League runners-up Liverpool. After prolonged negotiation, Southampton accepted a reported £25 million bid and Lallana joined the Merseyside club on 1 July 2014. Following England's return from the World Cup, Lallana signed for Liverpool, and was handed the number 20 shirt, the number he wore during his time at Southampton. Bournemouth, Lallana's youth team, had originally included a 25% sell-on-clause in his contract when he joined Southampton, but only received £4 million after agreeing to a reduced fee with Southampton.

On 25 July, Liverpool confirmed that Lallana had injured his knee while training with the club in Boston, Massachusetts during pre-season and would be out for six weeks. He therefore missed the start of the Premier League season, which began against former club Southampton. He made his debut in Liverpool's fourth match on 13 September, starting and being substituted for Raheem Sterling after 61 minutes in a 1–0 home defeat to Aston Villa. On 4 October he scored his first goal for the club, opening a 2–1 home win against West Bromwich Albion seconds before half time. Lallana scored his second goal for Liverpool on 2 December during Liverpool's 3–1 win at Leicester City. On 29 December, he continued his fine form and scored two goals in a 4–1 win against Swansea City at Anfield. On 14 February, Lallana scored the winning goal in a FA Cup fifth round match against Crystal Palace. On 19 April 2015, Lallana was selected in the Football Manager Team of the Decade at the Football League Awards.

On 17 September 2015, Lallana scored the opening goal in the new UEFA Europa League season opening group stage away match against Bordeaux at the Stade Chaban-Delmas, a match Liverpool went on to draw 1–1. On 1 October, Lallana scored in a second match in a row against Sion in the Europa League but the match ended in a 1–1 draw. On 23 January 2016, he came on as a second-half substitute and scored an injury-time winner in Liverpool's 5–4 away win at Norwich City. On 28 February 2016, Lallana came on as a second-half substitute and missed in the penalty shoot-out against Manchester City, resulting in Liverpool's defeat in the 2016 League Cup final. On 3 March 2016, he scored and assisted in Liverpool's 3–0 home win against Manchester City. On 23 April, he scored Liverpool's second goal against Newcastle United, which took the Reds to a 2–0 half-time lead, but the match ended with a 2–2 draw. On 5 May, he scored the third goal in Liverpool's second-leg win over Spanish team Villarreal in the Europa League semi-finals, with the Reds advancing to the final with a 3–1 aggregate win.

==== 2016–2020 ====
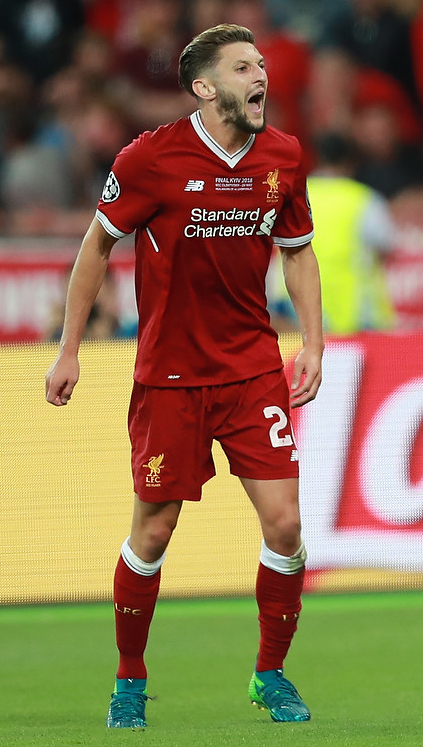
Lallana playing for Liverpool in the 2018 UEFA Champions League final

On 14 August 2016, during the opening match against Arsenal, Lallana scored Liverpool's second goal, which took the Reds to a 2–1 lead, with the match eventually ending in a 4–3 win for Liverpool. He was absent for parts of October and November due to reoccurring groin injuries. On 22 February 2017, Lallana signed a new long-term contract with Liverpool, keeping him at the club until 2020. On 21 May 2017, on the final day of the season, Lallana scored Liverpool's third goal in their 3–0 win over Middlesbrough, which secured a top-four finish for the Reds and qualification to the 2017–18 UEFA Champions League. Lallana ended the season with 42 appearances and 11 goals.

In August 2017, Lallana suffered a long-term injury during the Audi Cup final against Atlético Madrid, which would keep him out until mid-November. His first appearance of the season was on 17 November, in Liverpool's 1–1 draw with Chelsea, coming on as an 89th minute substitute for Philippe Coutinho. On 31 March, during a match against Crystal Palace, Lallana came on as a substitute in the 65th minute, but only several minutes after playing, he suffered another injury, which kept him out for "a number of weeks". He returned to the squad on 13 May, on the final day of the Premier League season, coming on as a substitute for Sadio Mané in the 74th minute, playing against Brighton & Hove Albion. Liverpool won the match 4–0, which was enough to secure a top-four finish and a place in the 2018–19 Champions League, as finishing in fourth place now meant that clubs in the Premier League will automatically qualify for the group stage, rather than qualifying initially for the play-off round.

On 26 May, during the 2018 Champions League final against Real Madrid, Lallana came on as a substitute in the 31st minute for Mohamed Salah, who had left the field in tears after suffering an injury, after being wrestled to the ground by Sergio Ramos. Liverpool would go on to lose the final 3–1. Lallana made only 13 appearances in the 2017–18 season, without scoring. The following season Lallana again only made occasional appearances, again making just 13 league appearances with no goals. He was however on the bench for the 2019 Champions League final which Liverpool won 2–0, his first major honour with Liverpool.

On 20 October 2019, Lallana came off the bench and equalised for Liverpool against Manchester United at Old Trafford in the 85th minute, his first goal in over two years, earning his side a 1–1 draw and helping them remain unbeaten in the league.

On 9 June 2020, Lallana signed a short-term contract extension with Liverpool, keeping him at the club until the end of the 2019–20 season which had been interrupted by the COVID-19 pandemic. On 25 June 2020, Liverpool clinched the 2019–20 Premier League title, marking their first league title in 30 years. Lallana left the club at the end of the season with his contract set to expire, ending his six-year stay at the club.

=== Brighton & Hove Albion ===
Lallana signed for Premier League club Brighton & Hove Albion on 27 July 2020 on a three-year contract on a free transfer. He made his debut on the opening day of the 2020–21 season starting in the 3–1 home loss against Chelsea but later going off injured. Lallana came on as a substitute against his previous club and defending champions Liverpool on 28 November, but was quickly subbed back off due to injury in the 1–1 home draw. On 3 February 2021, he made his first Anfield appearance since leaving Liverpool, where he came on as a substitute to help the Seagulls claim their first league win at Anfield since 1982. Lallana scored his first goal for Brighton, opening the scoring in an eventual 2–1 home loss to Leicester City on 6 March. On 18 May, Lallana came on as a substitute with Brighton 2–0 down against champions Manchester City; Lallana helped inspire a Brighton comeback as the Seagulls won 3–2 in front of returning home fans for their first win over the Sky Blues since 1989.

Lallana assisted Leandro Trossard's equaliser away at Liverpool on 30 October 2021, where The Seagulls came from 2–0 down to draw 2–2, in Lallana's second Anfield appearance since leaving and first in front of fans since the COVID-19 lockdowns. After the final whistle, there were touching scenes as he said "goodbye" to the Liverpool fans; after he went over to applaud them, they chanted his name. He captained Brighton for the first time on Boxing Day with the absence of Lewis Dunk, guiding Albion to a 2–0 home win over Brentford. With the further absence of Dunk, Lallana captained the side again three days later at Chelsea, with Danny Welbeck earning a 90+1st minute equaliser, finishing 1–1.

Following the departure of manager Graham Potter to Chelsea, Lallana assisted interim manager Andrew Crofts as first-team coach. He scored his second goal for Brighton 20 months after his first, opening the scoreline in the eventual 3–2 away victory over Wolverhampton Wanderers. He set up Kaoru Mitoma's first Albion goal to put Brighton back level in the game. On 13 March 2023, Lallana signed a one-year contract extension, keeping him at the club until 2024. On 13 May 2024, Lallana announced his departure from Brighton, citing family reasons as his main motivator.

=== Return to Southampton and retirement ===
On 14 June 2024, Lallana returned to Southampton on a one-year contract on a free transfer. He made his second debut for the club on 28 August in a 5–3 away victory against Cardiff City in the EFL Cup after he replaced Lesley Ugochukwu in the 64th minute. Following the departure of Ivan Jurić on 7 April 2025, it was announced that Lallana would assist interim manager Simon Rusk for the remainder of the season.

On 25 June 2025, Lallana announced his retirement from football.

== International career ==
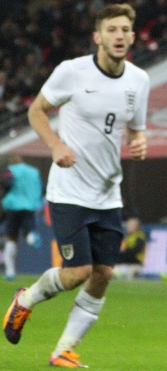
Lallana playing for England in 2013

Lallana played for England under-18s, scoring on his debut against Slovenia, 18 months after undergoing an operation to correct an irregular heartbeat. He also played once each for England under-19s and England under-21s. On 10 September 2012, Lallana was called up to the senior England squad for the first time for the 2014 World Cup qualifying match against Ukraine although he was not selected for the match itself.

On 7 November 2013, along with Southampton teammates Rickie Lambert and Jay Rodriguez, he was called up to the England team. Lallana won his first cap for England on 15 November by starting a friendly match against Chile at Wembley Stadium. Although England lost 2–0, Lallana's performance received generally favourable reviews. He also started in England's defeat against Germany four days later. He gained his third cap in a 1–0 friendly win against Denmark on 5 March 2014, coming on as a substitute for Jack Wilshere and crossing for Daniel Sturridge to head in the only goal of the match.

On 12 May 2014, Lallana was named in the 23-man England squad for the FIFA World Cup. He made his competitive debut on 14 June in the first group match against Italy, coming on for the last 10 minutes in place of Sturridge who had scored England's goal in the 1–2 defeat.

Lallana scored his first goal for England on 4 September 2016 in a 2018 World Cup qualification match away to Slovakia at the Anton Malatinský Stadium. It came during stoppage time and proved to be England's winning goal. He scored his second England goal on 11 November 2016 in a 2018 World Cup qualification match against Scotland. The match ended 3–0 to England, with Gary Cahill and Liverpool teammate Daniel Sturridge scoring the other goals.

On 30 January 2017, Lallana was named the England Player of the Year for 2016 after his performances for the national team.

== Coaching career ==
Following his retirement on 25 June 2025, Southampton confirmed that Lallana would continue in his role as first team coach alongside Carl Martin. On 30 January 2026, he became manager of Southampton Under-21s on a permanent basis.

== Personal life ==
Lallana married his fiancée Emily Jubb on 24 December 2013. The couple, who had been dating for seven years, were due to marry on 14 June 2014, which coincided with England's opening World Cup match with Italy. They wed at Poole Register Office in Dorset. Together, they have two sons, born in 2012 and 2015.

In August 2013, Lallana revealed he has ulcerative colitis.

In 2014, Lallana was signed as a French Connection model, to promote their Autumn/Winter collection. He revealed his fashion photo shoot at an interview with Esquire magazine.

== Career statistics ==
=== Club ===
Appearances and goals by club, season and competition
Club	Season	League			FA Cup		League Cup		Europe		Other		Total	
Club	Season	Division	Apps	Goals	Apps	Goals	Apps	Goals	Apps	Goals	Apps	Goals	Apps	Goals
Southampton	2006–07	Championship	1	0	0	0	1	0	—		—		2	0
Southampton	2007–08	Championship	5	1	0	0	0	0	—		—		5	1
Southampton	2008–09	Championship	40	1	0	0	3	1	—		—		43	2
Southampton	2009–10	League One	44	15	5	1	2	2	—		5 (Note: Appearance(s) in Football League Trophy)	2	56	20
Southampton	2010–11	League One	36	8	3	2	2	1	—		0	0	41	11
Southampton	2011–12	Championship	41	11	2	1	3	1	—		—		46	13
Southampton	2012–13	Premier League	30	3	0	0	0	0	—		—		30	3
Southampton	2013–14	Premier League	38	9	3	1	1	0	—		—		42	10
Southampton	Total		235	48	13	5	12	5	—		5	2	265	60
Bournemouth (loan)	2007–08	League One	3	0	—		—		—		1	0	4	0
Liverpool	2014–15	Premier League	27	5	4	1	4	0	6 (Note: Four appearances in UEFA Champions League, two appearances in UEFA Europa League)	0	—		41	6
Liverpool	2015–16	Premier League	30	4	0	0	6	0	13 (Note: Appearances in UEFA Europa League)	3	—		49	7
Liverpool	2016–17	Premier League	31	8	1	0	3	0	—		—		35	8
Liverpool	2017–18	Premier League	12	0	1	0	0	0	2 (Note: Appearances in UEFA Champions League)	0	—		15	0
Liverpool	2018–19	Premier League	13	0	0	0	0	0	3	0	—		16	0
Liverpool	2019–20	Premier League	15	1	2	0	2	0	0	0	3 (Note: One appearance in FA Community Shield, two appearances in FIFA Club World Cup)	0	22	1
Liverpool	Total		128	18	8	1	15	0	24	3	3	0	178	22
Brighton & Hove Albion	2020–21	Premier League	30	1	1	0	0	0	—		—		31	1
Brighton & Hove Albion	2021–22	Premier League	24	0	1	0	0	0	—		—		25	0
Brighton & Hove Albion	2022–23	Premier League	16	2	1	1	1	0	—		—		18	3
Brighton & Hove Albion	2023–24	Premier League	25	0	2	0	1	0	2	0	—		30	0
Brighton & Hove Albion	Total		95	3	5	1	2	0	2	0	—		104	4
Southampton	2024–25	Premier League	14	0	1	0	3	0	—		—		18	0
Career total			475	69	27	7	32	5	26	3	9	2	569	86

=== International ===
Appearances and goals by national team and year
National team	Year	Apps	Goals
England	2013	2	0
England	2014	11	0
England	2015	6	0
England	2016	10	3
England	2017	4	0
England	2018	1	0
Total		34	3

England score listed first, score column indicates score after each Lallana goal

List of international goals scored by Adam Lallana
No.	Date	Venue	Cap	Opponent	Score	Result	Competition	Ref.
1	4 September 2016	Anton Malatinský Stadium, Trnava, Slovakia	27	Slovakia	1–0	1–0	2018 FIFA World Cup qualification	
2	11 November 2016	Wembley Stadium, London, England	28	Scotland	2–0	3–0	2018 FIFA World Cup qualification	
2	15 November 2016	Wembley Stadium, London, England	29	Spain	1–0	2–2	Friendly	

== Honours ==
Southampton

- Football League Trophy: 2009–10
- Football League Championship runner-up: 2011–12
- Football League One runner-up: 2010–11

Liverpool

- Premier League: 2019–20
- UEFA Champions League: 2018–19; runner-up: 2017–18
- UEFA Super Cup: 2019
- FIFA Club World Cup: 2019
- Football League Cup runner-up: 2015–16
- UEFA Europa League runner-up: 2015–16

Individual

- PFA Team of the Year: 2010–11 League One, 2011–12 Championship, 2013–14 Premier League
- Football League Team of the Decade
- England Player of the Year: 2016
