= Javier Manquillo =

Spanish footballer (born 1994)

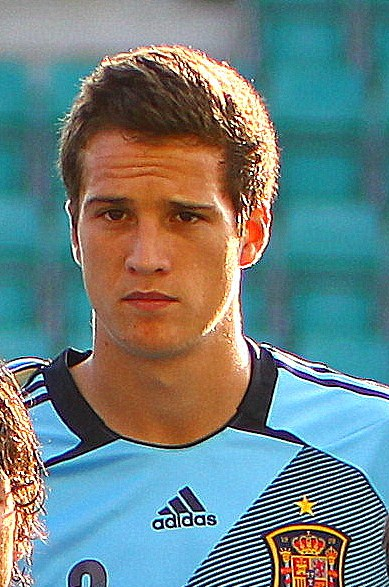
- Manquillo with Spain U19 in 2012

Personal information
- Full name: Javier Manquillo Gaitán
- Date of birth: 5 May 1994 (age 32)
- Place of birth: Madrid, Spain
- Height: 1.80 m (5 ft 11 in)
- Position: Right-back

Youth career
- 2004–2007: Real Madrid
- 2007–2011: Atlético Madrid

Senior career*
Years	Team	Apps	(Gls)
2011–2017	Atlético Madrid	6	(0)
2011–2013	Atlético Madrid B	42	(0)
2014–2015	→ Liverpool (loan)	10	(0)
2015–2016	→ Marseille (loan)	31	(0)
2016–2017	→ Sunderland (loan)	20	(1)
2017–2024	Newcastle United	96	(1)
2024–2025	Celta	22	(0)
Total		227	(2)

International career
2009	Spain U16	1	(0)
2010–2011	Spain U17	3	(0)
2012	Spain U18	2	(0)
2012–2013	Spain U19	5	(0)
2013	Spain U20	7	(0)
2014–2015	Spain U21	7	(0)
- * Club domestic league appearances and goals

Javier Manquillo Gaitán (born 5 May 1994) is a Spanish former professional footballer who played as a right-back.

Developed at Atlético Madrid, he played only 17 matches with the first team, spending most of his time in the reserve team or out on loan. He made numerous appearances in England's Premier League with Liverpool and Sunderland, and reached the Coupe de France final with Marseille in 2016. In July 2017, Manquillo signed for Newcastle United. He made 110 domestic appearances for the club in six-and-a-half seasons, before returning to Spain with RC Celta in January 2024.

Manquillo represented Spain at youth level across numerous ranks.

== Club career ==
=== Atlético Madrid ===
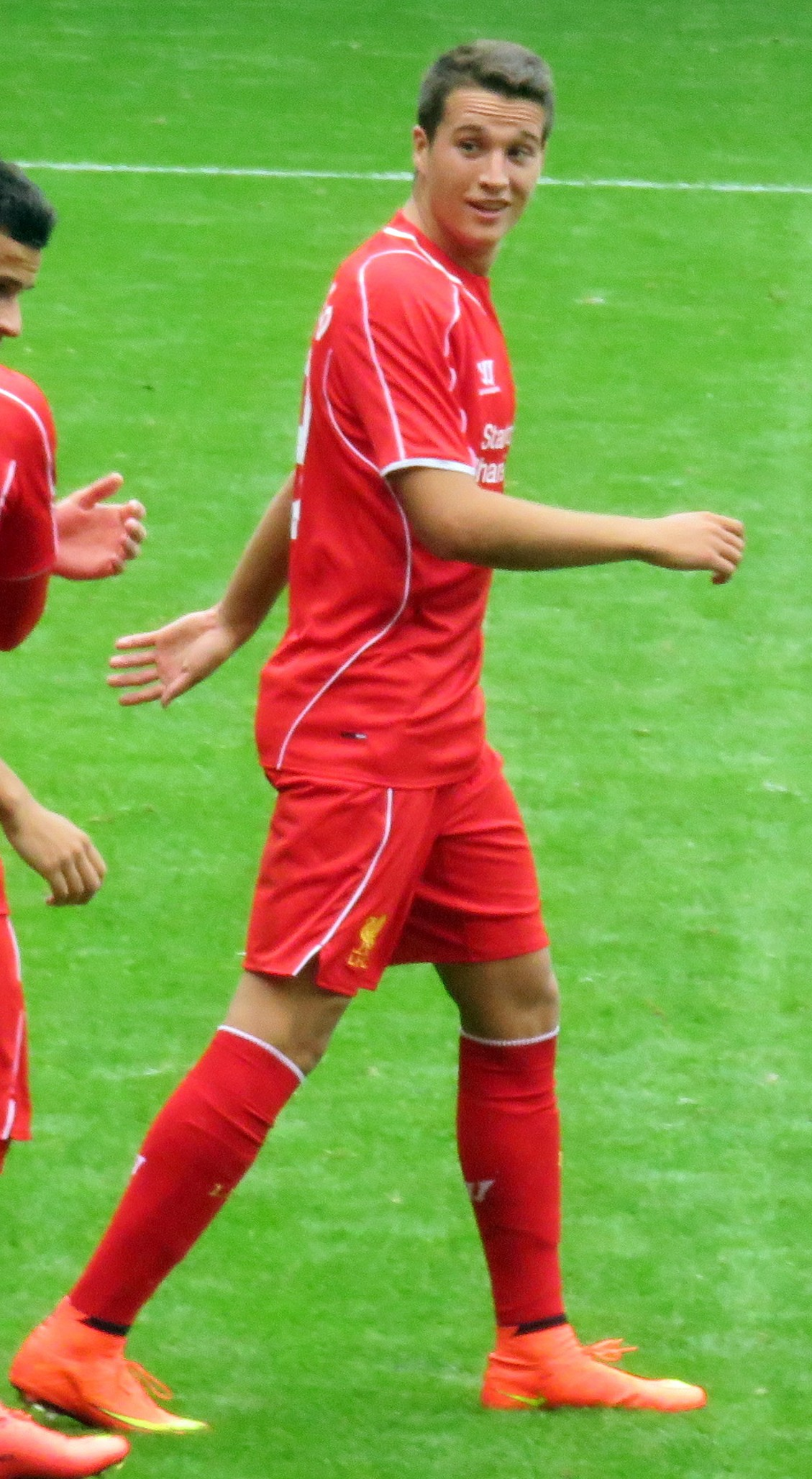
Manquillo playing for Liverpool in 2014

Born in Madrid, Manquillo started playing football with hometown's Real Madrid alongside his twin brother Víctor, a forward. However, in mid-2007, the club decided to release the latter and the former followed suit, with both signing for neighbouring Atlético Madrid 48 hours later.

On 8 December 2011, Manquillo made his competitive debut for the first team, starting in a 2–1 away loss against Albacete Balompié in the Copa del Rey (3–1 on aggregate). He was subsequently an unused substitute in the matches against Real Sociedad and Málaga.

On 28 November 2012, again in the domestic cup, Manquillo appeared in his second game with Atlético's main squad, featuring 63 minutes in a 3–0 victory at Real Jaén. On 6 December, he featured in the 1–0 away defeat to Viktoria Plzeň in the group stage of the UEFA Europa League. His debut in La Liga came on 9 December, coming on for Filipe Luís late into the second half of a 6–0 home win over Deportivo La Coruña. On 3 September 2013, he signed a contract extension, keeping him at the Vicente Calderón Stadium until June 2018.

On 11 February 2014, in the first half of the Spanish Cup semi-final clash against Real Madrid, Manquillo was involved in two incidents with Cristiano Ronaldo: in the early minutes, he conceded a penalty which the Portuguese converted in the first goal of an eventual 2–0 win (5–0 aggregate). Later, after both went for an aerial challenge, he fell headfirst to the ground, going on to be sidelined for more than one month with a neck injury.

Manquillo joined Premier League club Liverpool on 6 August 2014 on a two-year loan with an option to buy after his first season. He made his debut 11 days later, playing the full 90 minutes in a 2–1 Premier League victory over Southampton. On 16 September, he won a 93rd-minute penalty in the UEFA Champions League tie against Ludogorets Razgrad, which Steven Gerrard converted to make the score 2–1 and win the match. The following week, in the third round of the Football League Cup, he converted his penalty shoot-out attempt against Middlesbrough as his team prevailed 14–13 following a 2–2 draw. After featuring in 16 matches during the first part of the season, he played just three times in 2015, never in the domestic league, and Atlético Madrid subsequently confirmed that the loan deal had been terminated.

On 27 July 2015, Manquillo joined Ligue 1 club Marseille on loan for the 2015–16 season, with an option to buy. He made 43 total appearances, including the 4–2 loss to rivals Paris Saint-Germain in the Coupe de France final on 21 May.

Manquillo returned to the Premier League on 25 August 2016, joining Sunderland for the whole season. He had what he described as a difficult season on a personal basis, while the Wearsiders were relegated; he totalled 22 appearances and had a clause that would make his transfer permanent for £9.5 million were he to play 25 games. In his final game on 21 May, he scored his first career goal to open the scoring after three minutes at Chelsea, who won 5–1.

=== Newcastle United ===
On 21 July 2017, Manquillo signed for Premier League club Newcastle United on a three-year contract for an undisclosed fee, reported by the local Evening Chronicle to be £4.5 million; he was signed by compatriot manager Rafael Benítez. He made his debut on 13 August as the season began with a 2–0 home loss to Tottenham Hotspur.

Manquillo signed a new contract on 25 June 2020, tying him to St James' Park until 2024. He scored his first goal on 11 September 2021, in a 4–1 league loss away to Manchester United.

Manquillo's playing time became limited following the signing of England international Kieran Trippier, resulting in only 4 substitute appearances in the 2022-23 Premier League season.

=== Celta Vigo ===
On 21 January 2024, Manquillo joined Celta Vigo on a one-and-a-half-year contract for an undisclosed fee after failing to make a senior appearance for Newcastle United in the Premier League up until that point in the 2023–24 season, At Celta Vigo, he reunited with manager Rafael Benítez, who had signed him for Newcastle United. He made his debut on 4 February in a 3–0 win over Osasuna, being subbed after 73 minutes.

== International career ==
Manquillo earned 25 caps for Spain at youth level, including seven for the under-21s. He made his debut at that level on 4 September 2014, starting in a 1–0 win away to Hungary in 2015 UEFA European Under-21 Championship qualification.

== Career statistics ==
Appearances and goals by club, season and competition
Club	Season	League			National cup (Note: Includes Copa del Rey, FA Cup, Coupe de France)		League cup (Note: Includes Football League Cup/EFL Cup, Coupe de la Ligue)		Europe		Total	
Club	Season	Division	Apps	Goals	Apps	Goals	Apps	Goals	Apps	Goals	Apps	Goals
Atlético Madrid	2011–12	La Liga	0	0	1	0	—		0	0	1	0
Atlético Madrid	2012–13	La Liga	3	0	4	0	—		2 (Note: Appearances in UEFA Europa League)	0	9	0
Atlético Madrid	2013–14	La Liga	3	0	3	0	—		1 (Note: Appearance in UEFA Champions League)	0	7	0
Atlético Madrid	Total		6	0	8	0	0	0	3	0	17	0
Atlético Madrid B	2011–12	Segunda División B	13	0	—		—		—		13	0
Atlético Madrid B	2012–13	Segunda División B	29	0	—		—		—		29	0
Atlético Madrid B	Total		42	0	—		—		—		42	0
Liverpool (loan)	2014–15	Premier League	10	0	2	0	2	0	5 (Note: Four appearances in UEFA Champions League, one in UEFA Europa League)	0	19	0
Marseille (loan)	2015–16	Ligue 1	31	0	6	0	2	0	4	0	43	0
Sunderland (loan)	2016–17	Premier League	20	1	2	0	0	0	—		22	1
Newcastle United	2017–18	Premier League	21	0	2	0	0	0	—		23	0
Newcastle United	2018–19	Premier League	18	0	3	0	0	0	—		21	0
Newcastle United	2019–20	Premier League	21	0	2	0	1	0	—		24	0
Newcastle United	2020–21	Premier League	13	0	0	0	2	0	—		15	0
Newcastle United	2021–22	Premier League	19	1	1	0	1	0	—		21	1
Newcastle United	2022–23	Premier League	4	0	1	0	1	0	—		6	0
Newcastle United	2023–24	Premier League	0	0	0	0	0	0	0	0	0	0
Newcastle United	Total		96	1	9	0	5	0	0	0	110	1
Celta	2023–24	La Liga	13	0	0	0	0	0	0	0	0	0
Career total			205	2	27	0	9	0	12	0	253	2

== Honours ==
Atlético Madrid

- La Liga: 2013–14

Marseille

- Coupe de France runner-up: 2015–16

Newcastle United

- EFL Cup runner-up: 2022–23

Spain U19

- UEFA European Under-19 Championship: 2012
