= 2014–15 Liverpool F.C. season =

English football club season

Liverpool
2014–15 season
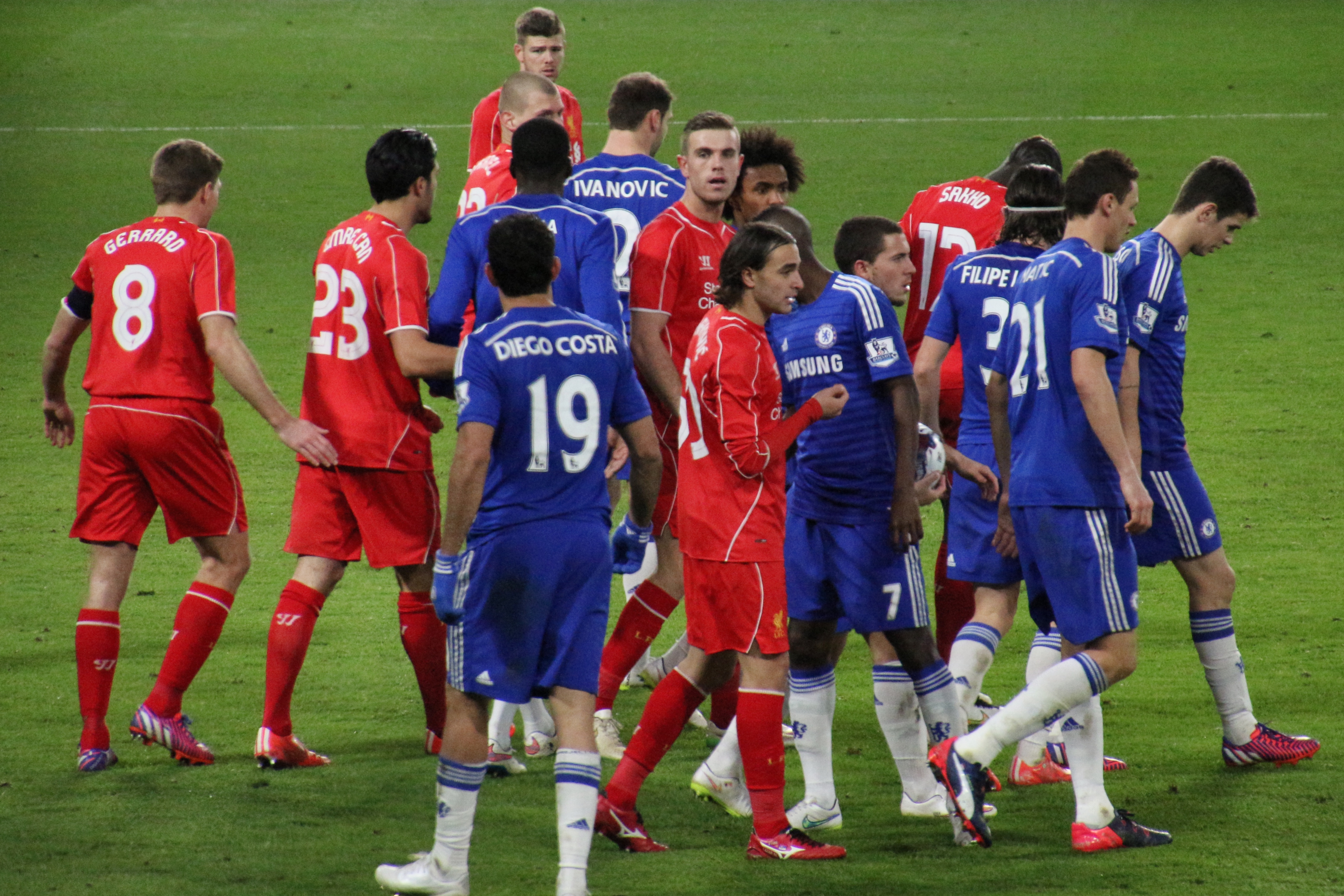
- Liverpool vs Chelsea in the League Cup semi-finals
- Owner: Fenway Sports Group
- Chairman: Tom Werner
- Manager: Brendan Rodgers
- Stadium: Anfield
- Premier League: 6th
- FA Cup: Semi-finals
- League Cup: Semi-finals
- UEFA Champions League: Group stage
- UEFA Europa League: Round of 32
- Top goalscorer: League: Steven Gerrard (9); All: Steven Gerrard (13)
- Highest home attendance: 44,736 (vs. Southampton, 17 August 2014)
- Lowest home attendance: 44,405 (vs. Manchester United, 22 March 2015)
- Average home league attendance: 44,736
Home colours	Away colours	Third colours

The 2014–15 season was Liverpool Football Club's 123rd season in existence and their 53rd consecutive season in the top flight of English football. It was also the club's 23rd consecutive season in the Premier League. Along with the Premier League, Liverpool also competed in the FA Cup, Football League Cup and UEFA Champions League (which they entered for the first time since 2009–10). Having finished third in their group, Liverpool subsequently dropped down to the UEFA Europa League.

This was captain Steven Gerrard's final season at the club due to the expiration of his contract, ending his 17-year spell at Liverpool. It was also the last season without Jürgen Klopp as manager until the 2024–25 season.

== Season review ==
Hopes were high at Liverpool, after a title run the previous season had seen them finish runners-up to eventual champions Manchester City. Following the sale of star striker Luis Suárez in the summer, the club spent £117 million on ten new arrivals to Anfield. Expectations were high as the new season started.

However, it did not take long for things to slowly unravel. Without Suarez, Liverpool only accumulated 28 points from a possible 57, equalling their worst league start for 50 years and ending the calendar year in 8th position. They also bowed out of the Champions League at the first hurdle, finishing 3rd in their group.

Despite this awful spell, the Reds eventually recovered after the New Year, and embarked on a 12-match unbeaten run, lifting hopes of Champions League qualification. However, after losing to Manchester United, Liverpool then suffered another poor run, which saw them win just twice in their last eight games. This killed off their hopes of Champions League qualification for the following season, although they did seal Europa League qualification for 2015–16 courtesy of Arsenal's 4–0 win over Aston Villa in the FA Cup Final.

The Reds reached both the League Cup and FA Cup semi-finals, where they lost to Chelsea and Aston Villa, respectively.

== First team ==
As it stood on 24 May 2015

Squad No.	Name	Nationality	Position(s)	Date of birth	Signed from	Apps	Goals	Assists
Goalkeepers
1	Brad Jones	(Australia)	GK	19 March 1982 (aged 33)	(England) Middlesbrough	27	0	0
22	Simon Mignolet	(Belgium)	GK	6 March 1988 (aged 27)	(England) Sunderland	94	0	0
52	Danny Ward	(Wales)	GK	22 June 1993 (aged 21)	(Wales) Wrexham	0	0	0
Defenders
2	Glen Johnson	(England)	RB/LB	23 August 1984 (aged 30)	(England) Portsmouth	200	9	13
3	José Enrique	(Spain)	LB	23 January 1986 (aged 29)	(England) Newcastle United	96	2	8
4	Kolo Touré	(Ivory Coast)	CB	19 March 1981 (aged 34)	(England) Manchester City	45	0	2
6	Dejan Lovren	(Croatia)	CB	5 July 1989 (aged 25)	(England) Southampton	38	1	0
17	Mamadou Sakho	(France)	CB	13 February 1990 (aged 25)	(France) Paris St Germain	46	1	0
18	Alberto Moreno	(Spain)	LB	5 July 1992 (aged 22)	(Spain) Sevilla	41	2	1
19	Javier Manquillo	(Spain)	RB	5 May 1994 (aged 21)	(Spain) Atlético Madrid	19	0	1
37	Martin Škrtel	(Slovakia)	CB	15 December 1984 (aged 30)	(Russia) Zenit	293	17	5
38	Jon Flanagan	(England)	RB/LB	1 January 1993 (aged 22)	(England) LFC Academy	42	1	1
Midfielders
8	Steven Gerrard (captain)	(England)	DM/CM/AM	30 May 1980 (aged 35)	(England) LFC Academy	710	186	145
10	Philippe Coutinho	(Brazil)	AM/LW/RW	12 June 1992 (aged 22)	(Italy) Inter Milan	102	16	19
14	Jordan Henderson (vice-captain)	(England)	CM	17 June 1990 (aged 24)	(England) Sunderland	186	20	29
20	Adam Lallana	(England)	AM/LW	10 May 1988 (aged 27)	(England) Southampton	41	6	4
21	Lucas	(Brazil)	DM/CM	9 January 1987 (aged 28)	(Brazil) Grêmio	275	6	15
23	Emre Can	(Germany)	DM/CM/CB	12 January 1994 (aged 21)	(Germany) Bayer Leverkusen	40	1	1
24	Joe Allen	(Wales)	DM/CM	14 March 1990 (aged 25)	(Wales) Swansea City	95	4	0
31	Raheem Sterling	(England)	LW/RW/AM	8 December 1994 (aged 20)	(England) Queens Park Rangers	129	23	17
32	Cameron Brannagan	(England)	AM	9 May 1996 (aged 19)	(England) LFC Academy	0	0	0
33	Jordon Ibe	(England)	LW/RW	8 December 1995 (aged 19)	(England) Wycombe Wanderers	17	0	2
46	Jordan Rossiter	(England)	DM/CM	24 March 1997 (aged 18)	(England) LFC Academy	1	1	0
50	Lazar Marković	(Serbia)	LW/RW/AM	2 March 1994 (aged 21)	(Portugal) Benfica	34	3	1
Forwards
9	Rickie Lambert	(England)	FW	16 February 1982 (aged 33)	(England) Southampton	36	3	2
15	Daniel Sturridge	(England)	FW	1 September 1989 (aged 25)	(England) Chelsea	67	40	11
29	Fabio Borini	(Italy)	FW	29 March 1991 (aged 24)	(Italy) Roma	38	3	3
45	Mario Balotelli	(Italy)	FW	12 August 1990 (aged 24)	(Italy) Milan	28	4	0
48	Jerome Sinclair	(England)	FW	20 September 1996 (aged 18)	(England) West Bromwich	3	0	0

== Transfers and loans ==
=== Transfers in ===
Entry date	Position	No.	Player	From club	Fee	Ref
1 July 2014	FW	9	(England) Rickie Lambert	(England) Southampton	£4,000,000	
1 July 2014	MF	20	(England) Adam Lallana	(England) Southampton	£25,000,000	
3 July 2014	MF	23	(Germany) Emre Can	(Germany) Bayer Leverkusen	£10,000,000	
15 July 2014	MF	50	(Serbia) Lazar Marković	(Portugal) Benfica	£20,000,000	
27 July 2014	DF	6	(Croatia) Dejan Lovren	(England) Southampton	£20,000,000	
29 July 2014	FW	—	(Belgium) Divock Origi	(France) Lille	£10,000,000	
16 August 2014	DF	18	(Spain) Alberto Moreno	(Spain) Sevilla	£12,000,000	
25 August 2014	FW	45	(Italy) Mario Balotelli	(Italy) Milan	£16,000,000	
Total transfer spending					£117,000,000	

=== Loans in ===
Start date	End date	Position	No.	Player	From club	Ref
6 August 2014	31 May 2016	DF	19	(Spain) Javier Manquillo	(Spain) Atlético Madrid	

=== Transfers out ===
Exit date	Position	No.	Player	To club	Fee	Ref.
11 July 2014	FW	7	(Uruguay) Luis Suárez	(Spain) Barcelona	£75,000,000	
6 August 2014	MF	35	(England) Conor Coady	(England) Huddersfield Town	£500,000	
8 August 2014	GK	25	(Spain) Pepe Reina	(Germany) Bayern Munich	£2,000,000	
14 August 2014	DF	34	(England) Martin Kelly	(England) Crystal Palace	£1,500,000	
28 August 2014	DF	49	(England) Jack Robinson	(England) Queens Park Rangers	£1,000,000	
30 August 2014	DF	5	(Denmark) Daniel Agger	(Denmark) Brøndby	£3,000,000	
12 January 2015	MF	11	(Morocco) Oussama Assaidi	(United Arab Emirates) Al Ahli Club	£4,700,000	
17 January 2015	MF	30	(Spain) Suso	(Italy) Milan	£1,000,000	
Total Transfer Sales					£88,700,000	

=== Loans out ===
Start date	End date	Position	No.	Player	To club	Ref.
26 June 2014	30 June 2015	MF	6	(Spain) Luis Alberto	(Spain) Málaga	
21 July 2014	30 June 2015	FW	9	(Spain) Iago Aspas	(Spain) Sevilla	
22 July 2014	30 June 2015	DF	47	(England) Andre Wisdom	(England) West Bromwich Albion	
29 July 2014	30 June 2015	FW	—	(Belgium) Divock Origi	(France) Lille	
7 August 2014	20 October 2014	DF	44	(Australia) Brad Smith	(England) Swindon Town	
15 August 2014	15 April 2015	MF	53	(Portugal) João Carlos Teixeira	(England) Brighton and Hove Albion	
18 August 2014	30 June 2015	DF	26	(Portugal) Tiago Ilori	(France) Bordeaux	
29 August 2014	15 January 2015	MF	33	(England) Jordon Ibe	(England) Derby County	
1 September 2014	30 June 2015	DF	16	(Uruguay) Sebastián Coates	(England) Sunderland	
1 September 2014	11 January 2015	MF	11	(Morocco) Oussama Assaidi	(England) Stoke City	
2 February 2015	30 June 2015	MF	54	(England) Sheyi Ojo	(England) Wigan Athletic	
16 March 2015	30 June 2015	FW	48	(England) Jerome Sinclair	(England) Wigan Athletic	
20 March 2015	19 April 2015	GK	52	(Wales) Danny Ward	(England) Morecambe	
26 March 2015	30 June 2015	MF	—	(England) Jordan Lussey	(England) Bolton Wanderers	
26 March 2015	25 April 2015	MF	41	(England) Jack Dunn	(England) Burton Albion	
26 March 2015	25 April 2015	DF	—	(England) Kevin Stewart	(England) Burton Albion	
26 March 2015	30 June 2015	MF	49	(Wales) Jordan Williams	(England) Notts County	

=== Transfer summary ===
Expenditure

Summer: ▼£117,000,000

Winter: ▼£0

Total: ▼£117,000,000

Income

Summer: ▲£83,000,000

Winter: ▲£5,700,000

Total: ▲£88,700,000

Total

Summer: ▼£33,550,000

Winter: ▲£5,700,000

Total: ▼£27,850,000

== Reserves team and Academy team ==
For more information on Liverpool's Reserve squad and The Academy see Liverpool F.C. Reserves and Academy

== Friendlies ==
=== Pre-season ===
16 July 2014 Friendly	Brøndby	2–1	Liverpool	Brøndbyvester, Denmark
17:00 BST	Nørgaard 24'; Hasani 90'	Report	Peterson 48'	Stadium: Brøndby Stadium; Attendance: 25,858; Referee: Kenn Hansen

19 July 2014 Friendly	Preston North End	1–2	Liverpool	Preston, England
15:00 BST	Brownhill 45+1'	Report	Suso 75'; Peterson 78'	Stadium: Deepdale; Attendance: 17,488; Referee: Jeremy Simpson

24 July 2014 Friendly	Liverpool	0–1	Roma	Boston, United States
00:30 BST		Report	Borriello 90'	Stadium: Fenway Park; Attendance: 37,000; Referee: Alan Kelly

10 August 2014 Friendly	Liverpool	4–0	Borussia Dortmund	Liverpool, England
12:15 BST	Sturridge 10'; Lovren 13'; Coutinho 49'; Henderson 61'	Report		Stadium: Anfield; Referee: Martin Atkinson

==== International Champions Cup ====
27 July 2014 Friendly	Liverpool	1–0	Olympiacos	Chicago, United States
23:00 BST	Sterling 5'	Report		Stadium: Soldier Field; Attendance: 36,170; Referee: José Carlos Rivero

30 July 2014 Friendly	Manchester City	2–2 (1–3 p)	Liverpool	New York City, United States
23:59 BST	Jovetić 53', 67'	Report	Henderson 59'; Sterling 85'	Stadium: Yankee Stadium; Attendance: 49,653; Referee: Silviu Petrescu
	Penalties
	Kolarov (penalty missed); Y. Touré (penalty missed); Navas (penalty missed); Iheanacho (penalty scored)		(penalty missed) Sturridge; (penalty scored) Can; (penalty scored) Henderson; (penalty scored) Lucas

2 August 2014 Friendly	Milan	0–2	Liverpool	Charlotte, United States
23:30 BST		Report	Allen 17'; Suso 89'	Stadium: Bank of America; Attendance: 69,364; Referee: Dave Gantar

5 August 2014 Friendly	Manchester United	3–1	Liverpool	Miami Gardens, United States
01:00 BST	Rooney 55'; Mata 57'; Lingard 88'	Report	Gerrard 14' (pen.)	Stadium: Sun Life Stadium; Attendance: 51,014; Referee: Mark Geiger

== Competitions ==
=== Overall record ===
Competition	First match	Last match	Starting round	Final position	Record							
Competition	First match	Last match	Starting round	Final position	Pld	W	D	L	GF	GA	GD	Win %
Premier League	17 August 2014	24 May 2015	Matchday 1	6th	38	18	8	12	52	48	+4	47.37
FA Cup	5 January 2015	19 April 2015	Third round	Semi-finals	7	4	2	1	8	5	+3	57.14
League Cup	23 September 2014	27 January 2015	Third round	Semi-finals	5	2	2	1	8	6	+2	40.00
UEFA Champions League	16 September 2014	9 December 2014	Group stage	Group stage	6	1	2	3	5	9	−4	16.67
UEFA Europa League	19 February 2015	26 February 2015	Round of 32	Round of 32	2	1	0	1	1	1	+0	50.00
Total					58	26	14	18	74	69	+5	44.83

Source: Soccerway

=== Premier League ===
==== League table ====
Pos	Team	Pld	W	D	L	GF	GA	GD	Pts	Qualification or relegation
4	Manchester United	38	20	10	8	62	37	+25	70	Qualification for the Champions League play-off round
5	Tottenham Hotspur	38	19	7	12	58	53	+5	64	Qualification for the Europa League group stage (Note: Since winners of the 2014–15 FA Cup, Arsenal, and winners of the 2014–15 Football League Cup, Chelsea, qualified for the Champions League based on league position, the spot awarded to the FA Cup winners (Europa League group stage) was passed to the sixth-placed team, Liverpool, and the spot awarded to the League Cup winners (Europa League third qualifying round) was passed to the seventh-placed team, Southampton, since those teams were the first teams in the table not already qualified for any European competition.)
6	Liverpool	38	18	8	12	52	48	+4	62	Qualification for the Europa League group stage
7	Southampton	38	18	6	14	54	33	+21	60	Qualification for the Europa League third qualifying round
8	Swansea City	38	16	8	14	46	49	−3	56	

Source: Barclays Premier League
Rules for classification: 1) Points; 2) Goal difference; 3) Goals scored; 4) Play-offs (only if needed to decide champion, teams for relegation or teams for UEFA competitions).

==== Results summary ====
Overall								Home						Away					
Pld	W	D	L	GF	GA	GD	Pts	W	D	L	GF	GA	GD	W	D	L	GF	GA	GD
38	18	8	12	52	48	+4	62	10	5	4	30	20	+10	8	3	8	22	28	−6

Last updated: 24 May 2015.
Source: Premier League

==== Results by matchday ====
Matchday	1	2	3	4	5	6	7	8	9	10	11	12	13	14	15	16	17	18	19	20	21	22	23	24	25	26	27	28	29	30	31	32	33	34	35	36	37	38
Ground	H	A	A	H	A	H	H	A	H	A	H	A	H	A	H	A	H	A	H	H	A	A	H	A	H	A	H	H	A	H	A	H	A	A	H	A	H	A
Result	W	L	W	L	L	D	W	W	D	L	L	L	W	W	D	L	D	W	W	D	W	W	W	D	W	W	W	W	W	L	L	W	D	L	W	D	L	L
Position	2	9	5	8	10	12	6	5	7	7	8	12	11	8	9	10	10	9	8	8	8	8	7	7	7	6	5	5	5	5	5	5	5	5	5	5	5	6

Updated to match(es) played on 24 May 2015. Source: Statto.com
A = Away; H = Home; W = Win; D = Draw; L = Loss

==== Matches ====
Win Draw Loss Postponed

17 August 2014 1	Liverpool	2–1	Southampton	Liverpool
13:30 BST	Sterling 23'; Manquillo (yellow card) 34'; Sturridge 79'	Report	Clyne 56'; Schneiderlin (yellow card) 65'; Davis (yellow card) 78'	Stadium: Anfield; Attendance: 44,736; Referee: Mark Clattenburg

25 August 2014 2	Manchester City	3–1	Liverpool	Manchester
20:00 BST	Touré (yellow card) 29'; Jovetić 41', 55'; Agüero 69'	Report	Can (yellow card) 76'; Zabaleta 83' (o.g.)	Stadium: Etihad Stadium; Attendance: 45,471; Referee: Michael Oliver

31 August 2014 3	Tottenham Hotspur	0–3	Liverpool	Tottenham
13:30 BST		Report	Sterling 8', (yellow card) 74'; Allen (yellow card) 27'; Manquillo (yellow card) 37'; Gerrard 49' (pen.); Moreno 60', (yellow card) 90'	Stadium: White Hart Lane; Attendance: 36,130; Referee: Phil Dowd

13 September 2014 4	Liverpool	0–1	Aston Villa	Liverpool
17:30 BST	Lallana (yellow card) 11'; Moreno (yellow card) 76'	Report	Agbonlahor 9'; Hutton (yellow card) 63'	Stadium: Anfield; Attendance: 44,689; Referee: Lee Mason

20 September 2014 5	West Ham United	3–1	Liverpool	Upton Park
17:30 BST	Reid 2', (yellow card) 4'; Sakho 7'; Adrián (yellow card) 17'; Kouyaté (yellow card) 28'; Jenkinson (yellow card) 66'; Amalfitano 88'	Report	Balotelli (yellow card) 17'; Sterling 27'	Stadium: Boleyn Ground; Attendance: 34,977; Referee: Craig Pawson

27 September 2014 6	Liverpool	1–1	Everton	Liverpool
12:45 BST	Gerrard 65', (yellow card) 69'; Moreno (yellow card) 90+3'	Report	Barry (yellow card) 2'; Jagielka 90+2'	Stadium: Anfield; Attendance: 44,511; Referee: Martin Atkinson

4 October 2014 7	Liverpool	2–1	West Bromwich Albion	Liverpool
15:00 BST	Škrtel (yellow card) 17'; Gerrard (yellow card) 28'; Lallana 45'; Henderson 61'	Report	Dawson (yellow card) 28'; Berahino 56' (pen.); Lescott (yellow card) 84'	Stadium: Anfield; Attendance: 44,708; Referee: Michael Oliver

19 October 2014 8	Queens Park Rangers	2–3	Liverpool	Shepherd's Bush
13:30 BST	Dunne (yellow card) 45+1'; Henry (yellow card) 80'; Vargas 87'; Gerrard 90+2' (o.g.)	Report	Dunne 67' (o.g.); Johnson (yellow card) 71'; Škrtel (yellow card) 82'; Coutinho (yellow card) 86', (goal) 90'; Caulker 90+5' (o.g.)	Stadium: Loftus Road; Attendance: 18,069; Referee: Phil Dowd

25 October 2014 9	Liverpool	0–0	Hull City	Liverpool
15:00 BST	Sterling (yellow card) 55'; Balotelli (yellow card) 57'; Henderson (yellow card) 81'	Report	Huddlestone (yellow card) 40'; Ben Arfa (yellow card) 50'	Stadium: Anfield; Attendance: 44,591; Referee: Neil Swarbrick

1 November 2014 10	Newcastle United	1–0	Liverpool	Newcastle
12:45 GMT	Taylor (yellow card) 45'; Sissoko (yellow card) 49'; Janmaat (yellow card) 62'; Pérez 73'; Colback (yellow card) 79'	Report	Škrtel (yellow card) 44'; Henderson (yellow card) 72'; Lovren (yellow card) 89'	Stadium: St James' Park; Attendance: 52,166; Referee: Andre Marriner

8 November 2014 11	Liverpool	1–2	Chelsea	Liverpool
12:45 GMT	Can 9'; Sterling (yellow card) 43'; Balotelli (yellow card) 65'	Report	Cahill 14'; Ivanović (yellow card) 48'; Costa 67', (yellow card) 87'; Matić (yellow card) 69'; Oscar (yellow card) 83'; Courtois (yellow card) 90+4'	Stadium: Anfield; Attendance: 44,698; Referee: Anthony Taylor

23 November 2014 12	Crystal Palace	3–1	Liverpool	Selhurst
13:30 GMT	Gayle 17'; Ledley 78'; Jedinak 81'; Hangeland (yellow card) 84'	Report	Lambert 2'; Škrtel (yellow card) 53'; Manquillo (yellow card) 61'	Stadium: Selhurst Park; Attendance: 24,862; Referee: Jonathan Moss

29 November 2014 13	Liverpool	1–0	Stoke City	Liverpool
15:00 GMT	Johnson 85'	Report	Wilson (yellow card) 38'; Cameron (yellow card) 53'; Shawcross (yellow card) 58'	Stadium: Anfield; Attendance: 44,735; Referee: Craig Pawson

2 December 2014 14	Leicester City	1–3	Liverpool	Leicester
19:45 GMT	Mignolet 22' (o.g.); Morgan (red card) 63'; Schlupp (yellow card) 83'	Report	Lallana 26', (yellow card) 38'; Gerrard 54', (yellow card) 65'; Henderson 83'	Stadium: King Power Stadium; Attendance: 32,000; Referee: Lee Mason

6 December 2014 15	Liverpool	0–0	Sunderland	Liverpool
15:00 GMT	Lucas (yellow card) 51'	Report	Vergini (yellow card) 41'; Bridcutt (yellow card) 60'; Buckley (yellow card) 80'	Stadium: Anfield; Attendance: 44,716; Referee: Neil Swarbrick

14 December 2014 16	Manchester United	3–0	Liverpool	Manchester
13:30 GMT	Fellaini (yellow card) 5'; Rooney 12', (yellow card) 43'; Jones (yellow card) 21'; Evans (yellow card) 37'; Mata 40'; Van Persie 71'	Report	Allen (yellow card) 29'; Balotelli (yellow card) 74'; Gerrard (yellow card) 84'	Stadium: Old Trafford; Attendance: 75,331; Referee: Martin Atkinson

21 December 2014 17	Liverpool	2–2	Arsenal	Liverpool
16:00 GMT	Coutinho 45'; Borini (yellow card) 90' (yellow-red card) 90+2'; Škrtel 90+7'	Report	Flamini (yellow card) 14'; Debuchy 45+2', (yellow card) 47'; Giroud 64'; Cazorla (yellow card) 90+3'	Stadium: Anfield; Attendance: 44,703; Referee: Michael Oliver

26 December 2014 18	Burnley	0–1	Liverpool	Burnley
15:00 GMT		Report	Sterling 62'; Lucas (yellow card) 82'	Stadium: Turf Moor; Attendance: 21,335; Referee: Anthony Taylor

29 December 2014 19	Liverpool	4–1	Swansea City	Liverpool
20:00 GMT	Moreno 33'; Škrtel (yellow card) 49'; Lallana 51', 61'; Shelvey 69' (o.g.)	Report	Sigurðsson 52'	Stadium: Anfield; Attendance: 44,714; Referee: Andre Marriner

1 January 2015 20	Liverpool	2–2	Leicester City	Liverpool
15:00 GMT	Gerrard 17' (pen.), 40' (pen.), (yellow card) 90+1'; Lucas (yellow card) 21'	Report	Wasilewski (yellow card) 36'; Nugent 58'; Schlupp 60'; James (yellow card) 89'	Stadium: Anfield; Attendance: 44,720; Referee: Mike Jones

10 January 2015 21	Sunderland	0–1	Liverpool	Sunderland
12:45 GMT	Vergini (yellow card) 28'; Bridcutt (yellow card) 35' (yellow-red card) 49'	Report	Marković 9'; Borini (yellow card) 17'; Coutinho (yellow card) 36'; Henderson (yellow card) 54'; Lovren (yellow card) 55'	Stadium: Stadium of Light; Attendance: 45,369; Referee: Craig Pawson

17 January 2015 22	Aston Villa	0–2	Liverpool	Birmingham
15:00 GMT	Okore (yellow card) 52'	Report	Borini 24'; Lambert 79', (yellow card) 81'	Stadium: Villa Park; Attendance: 39,759; Referee: Mark Clattenburg

31 January 2015 23	Liverpool	2–0	West Ham United	Liverpool
15:00 GMT	Sterling 51', (yellow card) 90+2'; Sturridge 80'	Report	Carroll (yellow card) 60'	Stadium: Anfield; Attendance: 44,718; Referee: Andre Marriner

7 February 2015 24	Everton	0–0	Liverpool	Liverpool
17:30 GMT	McCarthy (yellow card) 37'; Oviedo (yellow card) 72'; Naismith (yellow card) 79'; Bešić (yellow card) 79'	Report	Henderson (yellow card) 79'	Stadium: Goodison Park; Attendance: 39,621; Referee: Anthony Taylor

10 February 2015 25	Liverpool	3–2	Tottenham Hotspur	Liverpool
20:00 GMT	Marković 15'; Škrtel (yellow card) 40'; Sakho (yellow card) 45'; Gerrard 53' (pen.), (yellow card) 60'; Balotelli 83'	Report	Mason (yellow card) 25'; Kane 26', (yellow card) 90+4'; Eriksen (yellow card) 28'; Dembélé 61', (yellow card) 63'; Walker (yellow card) 73'; Paulinho (yellow card) 88'	Stadium: Anfield; Attendance: 44,577; Referee: Phil Dowd

22 February 2015 26	Southampton	0–2	Liverpool	Southampton
16:15 GMT	Wanyama (yellow card) 63'; Elia (yellow card) 90+1'	Report	Coutinho 3'; Lovren (yellow card) 43'; Sterling 73'; Moreno (yellow card) 78'; Henderson (yellow card) 84'	Stadium: St Mary's Stadium; Attendance: 31,723; Referee: Kevin Friend

1 March 2015 27	Liverpool	2–1	Manchester City	Liverpool
12:00 GMT	Henderson 11'; Coutinho 75'; Lallana (yellow card) 84'	Report	Džeko 26'; Nasri (yellow card) 57'; Milner (yellow card) 82'; Bony (yellow card) 86'	Stadium: Anfield; Attendance: 44,590; Referee: Mark Clattenburg

4 March 2015 28	Liverpool	2–0	Burnley	Liverpool
20:00 GMT	Henderson 29'; Sturridge 51'	Report	Mee (yellow card) 85'	Stadium: Anfield; Attendance: 44,717; Referee: Lee Mason

16 March 2015 29	Swansea City	0–1	Liverpool	Swansea
20:00 GMT		Report	Henderson (yellow card) 6', (goal) 68'; Sterling (yellow card) 26'; Moreno (yellow card) 50'	Stadium: Liberty Stadium; Attendance: 20,828; Referee: Roger East

22 March 2015 30	Liverpool	1–2	Manchester United	Liverpool
13:30 GMT	Allen (yellow card) 19'; Gerrard (red card) 46'; Balotelli (yellow card) 67'; Sturridge 69'	Report	Mata 14', 59'; Herrera (yellow card) 47'; Jones (yellow card) 56'	Stadium: Anfield; Attendance: 44,405; Referee: Martin Atkinson

4 April 2015 31	Arsenal	4–1	Liverpool	Holloway
12:45 BST	Bellerín 37' (yellow card) 70'; Özil 40'; Sánchez 45'; Giroud 90+1'	Report	Can (yellow card) 49' (yellow-red card) 84'; Henderson 76' (pen.)	Stadium: Emirates Stadium; Attendance: 60,081; Referee: Anthony Taylor

13 April 2015 32	Liverpool	2–0	Newcastle United	Liverpool
20:00 BST	Sterling 9'; Allen 70'; Johnson (yellow card) 78'; Moreno (yellow card) 90'	Report	Sissoko (yellow card) 78' (yellow-red card) 83'	Stadium: Anfield; Attendance: 44,611; Referee: Lee Mason

25 April 2015 34	West Bromwich Albion	0–0	Liverpool	West Bromwich
15:00 BST	Dawson (yellow card) 61'	Report		Stadium: The Hawthorns; Attendance: 26,663; Referee: Roger East

28 April 2015 33	Hull City	1–0	Liverpool	Hull
19:45 BST	Dawson 37'; Livermore (yellow card) 39'; Ramírez (yellow card) 90+5'	Report		Stadium: KC Stadium; Attendance: 24,843; Referee: Lee Probert

2 May 2015 35	Liverpool	2–1	Queens Park Rangers	Liverpool
15:00 BST	Gerrard (yellow card) 18', (goal) 87'; Coutinho 19'; Lovren (yellow card) 75'	Report	Sandro (yellow card) 43'; Fer 73'; Dunne (yellow card) 76'; Onuoha (yellow card) 79' (yellow-red card) 82'; Austin (yellow card) 90+3'	Stadium: Anfield; Attendance: 44,707; Referee: Martin Atkinson

10 May 2015 36	Chelsea	1–1	Liverpool	Fulham
16:00 BST	Fàbregas (yellow card) 2'; Terry 5'; Ivanović (yellow card) 43'; Mikel (yellow card) 58'; Filipe Luís (yellow card) 82'	Report	Lallana (yellow card) 20'; Škrtel (yellow card) 26'; Lambert (yellow card) 29'; Gerrard 44'	Stadium: Stamford Bridge; Attendance: 41,547; Referee: Andre Marriner

16 May 2015 37	Liverpool	1–3	Crystal Palace	Liverpool
17:30 BST	Lallana 26'; Can (yellow card) 42'; Coutinho (yellow card) 87'	Report	Puncheon 43'; Zaha 60'; Ward (yellow card) 79'; McArthur (yellow card) 83'; Mutch (yellow card) 85'; Murray 90'	Stadium: Anfield; Attendance: 44,673; Referee: Jonathan Moss

24 May 2015 38	Stoke City	6–1	Liverpool	Stoke-on-Trent
15:00 BST	Adam (yellow card) 8', (goal) 41'; Whelan (yellow card) 16'; Diouf 22', 26'; Walters 30'; Nzonzi 45'; Shawcross (yellow card) 46'; Pieters (yellow card) 77'; Crouch 86'	Report	Leiva (yellow card) 14'; Škrtel (yellow card) 48'; Gerrard 70'	Stadium: Britannia Stadium; Attendance: 27,602; Referee: Anthony Taylor

=== FA Cup ===
5 January 2015 Third round	AFC Wimbledon	1−2	Liverpool	Kingston upon Thames
19:55 GMT	Akinfenwa 36', (yellow card) 39'; Fuller (yellow card) 61'; Goodman (yellow card) 70'	Report	Gerrard 12', 62'; Coutinho (yellow card) 77'	Stadium: Kingsmeadow; Attendance: 4,784; Referee: Jon Moss

24 January 2015 Fourth round	Liverpool	0−0	Bolton Wanderers	Liverpool
17:30 GMT		Report	Mills (yellow card) 13'; Vela (yellow card) 17'; Dervite (yellow card) 73'; Pratley (yellow card) 85'	Stadium: Anfield; Attendance: 43,847; Referee: Kevin Friend

4 February 2015 Fourth round Replay	Bolton Wanderers	1–2	Liverpool	Bolton
19:45 GMT	Danns (yellow card) 29' (yellow-red card) 66'; Wheater (yellow card) 55'; Guðjohnsen 59' (pen.)	Report	Allen (yellow card) 60'; Sterling 86'; Coutinho 90+1'	Stadium: Macron Stadium; Attendance: 22,171; Referee: Roger East

14 February 2015 Fifth round	Crystal Palace	1–2	Liverpool	Selhurst
17:30 GMT	Campbell 15'; Chamakh (yellow card) 36'	Report	Henderson (yellow card) 29'; Sturridge 49'; Lallana 58'; Can (yellow card) 74'; Mignolet (yellow card) 90+2'	Stadium: Selhurst Park; Attendance: 20,391; Referee: Robert Madley

8 March 2015 Sixth round	Liverpool	0–0	Blackburn Rovers	Liverpool
16:00 GMT	Can (yellow card) 45+1'	Report	Cairney (yellow card) 88'	Stadium: Anfield; Attendance: 43,820; Referee: Andre Marriner

8 April 2015 Sixth round Replay	Blackburn Rovers	0–1	Liverpool	Blackburn
19:45 BST	Evans (yellow card) 68'	Report	Coutinho 70'; Sterling (yellow card) 90+3'	Stadium: Ewood Park; Attendance: 28,415; Referee: Kevin Friend

19 April 2015 Semi-finals	Aston Villa	2–1	Liverpool	Wembley
15:00 BST	Benteke 36'; Delph 54', (yellow card) 80'	Report	Coutinho 30'	Stadium: Wembley Stadium; Attendance: 85,416; Referee: Michael Oliver

=== League Cup ===
23 September 2014 Third round	Liverpool	2–2 (a.e.t.) (14–13 p)	Middlesbrough	Liverpool
19:45 BST	Rossiter 10'; Sakho (yellow card) 61'; Suso 109'	Report	Omeruo (yellow card) 57'; Reach 62', (yellow card) 106'; Bamford 120+3' (pen.)	Stadium: Anfield; Attendance: 41,857; Referee: Mike Jones
	Penalties
	Balotelli (penalty scored); Lucas (penalty scored); Lallana (penalty scored); Suso (penalty scored); Sterling (penalty missed); Williams (penalty scored); Touré (penalty scored); Sakho (penalty scored); Manquillo (penalty scored); José Enrique (penalty scored); Mignolet (penalty scored); Balotelli (penalty scored); Lucas (penalty scored); Lallana (penalty scored); Suso (penalty scored)		(penalty missed) Bamford; (penalty scored) Clayton; (penalty scored) Reach; (penalty scored) Adomah; (penalty scored) Vossen; (penalty scored) Friend; (penalty scored) Ayala; (penalty scored) Fredericks; (penalty scored) Omeruo; (penalty scored) Wildschut; (penalty scored) Blackman; (penalty scored) Bamford; (penalty scored) Clayton; (penalty scored) Reach; (penalty missed) Adomah

28 October 2014 Fourth round	Liverpool	2–1	Swansea City	Liverpool
20:00 GMT	Balotelli 86'; Touré (yellow card) 90'; Lovren 90+5'	Report	Fulton (yellow card) 51'; Taylor (yellow card) 63'; Emnes 65'; Williams (yellow card) 82'; Fernández (red card) 90+2'	Stadium: Anfield; Attendance: 42,582; Referee: Keith Stroud

17 December 2014 Fifth round	Bournemouth	1–3	Liverpool	Bournemouth
19:45 GMT	Gosling 57'	Report	Sterling 20', 51'; Marković 27'	Stadium: Goldsands Stadium; Attendance: 11,347; Referee: Mark Clattenburg

20 January 2015 Semi-finals First leg	Liverpool	1–1	Chelsea	Liverpool
19:45 GMT	Gerrard (yellow card) 39'; Lucas (yellow card) 44'; Sterling 59'	Report	Hazard 18' (pen.); Filipe Luís (yellow card) 45'; Mikel (yellow card) 74'	Stadium: Anfield; Attendance: 44,573; Referee: Martin Atkinson

27 January 2015 Semi-finals Second leg	Chelsea	1–0 (a.e.t.) (2–1 agg.)	Liverpool	Fulham
19:45 GMT	Terry (yellow card) 74'; Ivanović (yellow card) 89' (goal) 94'; Costa (yellow card) 102'; Oscar (yellow card) 107'	Report	Henderson (yellow card) 42'; Lucas (yellow card) 53'; Gerrard (yellow card) 102'; Can (yellow card) 113'; Škrtel (yellow card) 116'	Stadium: Stamford Bridge; Attendance: 40,659; Referee: Michael Oliver

=== UEFA Champions League ===
==== Group stage ====
Pos	Team	Pld	W	D	L	GF	GA	GD	Pts	Qualification	RMA	BSL	LIV	LUD
1	(Spain) Real Madrid	6	6	0	0	16	2	+14	18	Advance to knockout phase	—	5–1	1–0	4–0
2	(Switzerland) Basel	6	2	1	3	7	8	−1	7	Advance to knockout phase	0–1	—	1–0	4–0
3	(England) Liverpool	6	1	2	3	5	9	−4	5	Transfer to Europa League	0–3	1–1	—	2–1
4	(Bulgaria) Ludogorets Razgrad	6	1	1	4	5	14	−9	4		1–2	1–0	2–2	—

Source: UEFA
Rules for classification: Group stage tiebreakers

16 September 2014 1	Liverpool (England)	2–1	(Bulgaria) Ludogorets Razgrad	Liverpool, England
19:45 BST	Balotelli 82'; Gerrard 90+3' (pen.)	Report	A. Aleksandrov (yellow card) 5'; Caiçara (yellow card) 54'; Minev (yellow card) 76'; Abalo 90+1'; Borjan (yellow card) 90+2'	Stadium: Anfield; Attendance: 43,307; Referee: Matej Jug (Slovenia)

1 October 2014 2	Basel (Switzerland)	1–0	(England) Liverpool	Basel, Switzerland
19:45 BST	Streller 52'; Suchý (yellow card) 60'	Report	Sterling (yellow card) 9'; Gerrard (yellow card) 54'; Balotelli (yellow card) 71'	Stadium: St. Jakob-Park; Attendance: 36,000; Referee: Jonas Eriksson (Sweden)

22 October 2014 3	Liverpool (England)	0–3	(Spain) Real Madrid	Liverpool, England
19:45 BST		Report	Ronaldo 23'; Benzema 30', 41'; Kroos (yellow card) 36'	Stadium: Anfield; Attendance: 43,521; Referee: Nicola Rizzoli (Italy)

4 November 2014 4	Real Madrid (Spain)	1–0	(England) Liverpool	Madrid, Spain
19:45 GMT	Benzema 27'; Rodríguez (yellow card) 53'; Ramos (yellow card) 60'; Marcelo (yellow card) 76'	Report	Škrtel (yellow card) 47'; Moreno (yellow card) 85'	Stadium: Santiago Bernabéu; Attendance: 79,283; Referee: Viktor Kassai (Hungary)

26 November 2014 5	Ludogorets Razgrad (Bulgaria)	2–2	(England) Liverpool	Sofia, Bulgaria
19:45 GMT	Dani 3'; Terziev 88'	Report	Lambert 8'; Henderson 37'	Stadium: Vasil Levski National Stadium; Attendance: 37,143; Referee: Antonio Mateu Lahoz (Spain)

9 December 2014 6	Liverpool (England)	1–1	(Switzerland) Basel	Liverpool, England
19:45 GMT	Lucas (yellow card) 47'; Marković (red card) 60'; Lovren (yellow card) 66'; Moreno (yellow card) 77'; Gerrard 81'	Report	F. Frei 25'; Schär (yellow card) 80'	Stadium: Anfield; Attendance: 43,290; Referee: Björn Kuipers (Netherlands)

=== UEFA Europa League ===
==== Knockout phase ====
===== Round of 32 =====
19 February 2015 First leg	Liverpool (England)	1–0	(Turkey) Beşiktaş	Liverpool, England
20:05 GMT	Lovren (yellow card) 68'; Balotelli 85' (pen.)	Report	Gülüm (yellow card) 45'; Kurtuluş (yellow card) 77'; Motta (yellow card) 84'; Franco (yellow card) 90+3'	Stadium: Anfield; Attendance: 43,353; Referee: Szymon Marciniak (Poland)

26 February 2015 Second leg	Beşiktaş (Turkey)	1–0 (a.e.t.) (1–1 agg.) (5–4 p)	(England) Liverpool	Istanbul, Turkey
18:00 GMT	Arslan 72'	Report	Balotelli (yellow card) 11'; Can (yellow card) 103'	Stadium: Atatürk Olympic Stadium; Attendance: 63,324; Referee: Damir Skomina (Slovenia)
	Penalties
	Ba (penalty scored); Töre (penalty scored); Kavlak (penalty scored); Hutchinson (penalty scored); Arslan (penalty scored)		(penalty scored) Lambert; (penalty scored) Lallana; (penalty scored) Can; (penalty scored) Allen; (penalty missed) Lovren

== Squad statistics ==
=== Appearances ===
Numbers in parentheses denote appearances as substitute.
Players with no appearances not included in the list.

As of match played 24 May 2015

No.	Pos.	Nat.	Name	Premier League	FA Cup	League Cup	Europe (Note: Appearances in UEFA Champions League and UEFA Europa League)	Total
No.	Pos.	Nat.	Name	Apps	Apps	Apps	Apps	Apps
1	GK	(Australia)	Brad Jones	3	0	2	0	5
2	DF	(England)	Glen Johnson	15 (4)	3 (1)	1 (1)	2	21 (6)
3	DF	(Spain)	José Enrique	2 (2)	1 (1)	1	1	5 (3)
4	DF	(Ivory Coast)	Kolo Touré	6 (5)	0 (3)	3	3	12 (8)
6	DF	(Croatia)	Dejan Lovren	22 (4)	3 (1)	2	5 (1)	32 (6)
8	MF	(England)	Steven Gerrard	25 (4)	3	3	4 (1)	35 (5)
9	FW	(England)	Rickie Lambert	7 (17)	1 (3)	2 (1)	1 (2)	11 (23)
10	MF	(Brazil)	Philippe Coutinho	31 (3)	7	4	4 (1)	46 (4)
14	MF	(England)	Jordan Henderson	35 (1)	6 (1)	4	6	52 (2)
15	FW	(England)	Daniel Sturridge	7 (5)	3 (1)	0	2	12 (6)
17	DF	(France)	Mamadou Sakho	14 (1)	5	3 (1)	2	24 (2)
18	DF	(Spain)	Alberto Moreno	25 (2)	4	2	5 (1)	36 (3)
19	DF	(Spain)	Javier Manquillo	10	2	2	4 (1)	18 (1)
20	MF	(England)	Adam Lallana	22 (4)	4	2 (2)	3 (3)	31 (9)
21	MF	(Brazil)	Lucas	15 (4)	3 (1)	5	2 (1)	25 (6)
22	GK	(Belgium)	Simon Mignolet	35 (1)	7	3	8	52 (1)
23	MF	(Germany)	Emre Can	22 (4)	6	2 (1)	3 (1)	33 (6)
24	MF	(Wales)	Joe Allen	16 (5)	5	0	5	26 (5)
29	FW	(Italy)	Fabio Borini	3 (9)	0 (2)	1 (1)	1 (1)	5 (12)
31	MF	(England)	Raheem Sterling	33 (1)	5	4	5 (2)	47 (3)
33	MF	(England)	Jordon Ibe	7 (5)	0	0	2	9 (5)
37	DF	(Slovakia)	Martin Škrtel	33	5	3	7	48
45	FW	(Italy)	Mario Balotelli	10 (6)	0 (4)	0 (3)	4 (1)	14 (14)
46	MF	(England)	Jordan Rossiter	0	0	1	0	1
48	FW	(England)	Jerome Sinclair	0 (2)	0	0	0	0 (2)
49	MF	(Wales)	Jordan Williams	0	0	0 (1)	0	0 (1)
50	MF	(Serbia)	Lazar Marković	11 (7)	5 (1)	4 (1)	2 (1)	22 (10)
Players who are on loan/left Liverpool that have appeared this season:
30	MF	(Spain)	Suso	0	0	0 (1)	0	0 (1)

=== Goalscorers ===
Includes all competitive matches.

As of match played 24 May 2015

Rank	Pos.	No.	Player	Premier League	FA Cup	League Cup	Europe (Note: Goals in UEFA Champions League and UEFA Europa League)	Total
1	MF	8	(England) Steven Gerrard	9	2	0	2	13
2	MF	31	(England) Raheem Sterling	7	1	3	0	11
3	MF	10	(Brazil) Philippe Coutinho	5	3	0	0	8
4	MF	14	(England) Jordan Henderson	6	0	0	1	7
5	MF	20	(England) Adam Lallana	5	1	0	0	6
6	FW	15	(England) Daniel Sturridge	4	1	0	0	5
7	FW	45	(Italy) Mario Balotelli	1	0	1	2	4
8	FW	9	(England) Rickie Lambert	2	0	0	1	3
8	MF	50	(Serbia) Lazar Marković	2	0	1	0	3
10	DF	18	(Spain) Alberto Moreno	2	0	0	0	2
11	DF	2	(England) Glen Johnson	1	0	0	0	1
11	DF	6	(Croatia) Dejan Lovren	0	0	1	0	1
11	MF	23	(Germany) Emre Can	1	0	0	0	1
11	MF	24	(Wales) Joe Allen	1	0	0	0	1
11	FW	29	(Italy) Fabio Borini	1	0	0	0	1
11	MF	30	(Spain) Suso**	0	0	1	0	1
11	DF	37	(Slovakia) Martin Škrtel	1	0	0	0	1
11	MF	46	(England) Jordan Rossiter	0	0	1	0	1
#	Own Goal			4	0	0	0	4
TOTALS				52	8	8	6	74

** Players who no longer play for Liverpool's current season

=== Disciplinary record ===
As of match played 24 May 2015

No.	Pos.	Name	Premier League		FA Cup		League Cup		Europe (Note: Bookings in UEFA Champions League and UEFA Europa League)		Total	
No.	Pos.	Name	Yellow card	Red card	Yellow card	Red card	Yellow card	Red card	Yellow card	Red card	Yellow card	Red card
8	MF	(England) Steven Gerrard	7	1	0	0	2	0	1	0	10	1
37	DF	(Slovakia) Martin Škrtel	8	0	0	0	1	0	1	0	10	0
14	MF	(England) Jordan Henderson	6	0	1	0	1	0	0	0	8	0
18	DF	(Spain) Alberto Moreno	6	0	0	0	0	0	2	0	8	0
21	MF	(Brazil) Lucas	4	0	0	0	2	0	1	0	7	0
31	MF	(England) Raheem Sterling	5	0	1	0	0	0	1	0	7	0
45	FW	(Italy) Mario Balotelli	5	0	0	0	0	0	2	0	7	0
23	MF	(Germany) Emre Can	2	1	2	0	1	0	1	0	6	1
6	MF	(Croatia) Dejan Lovren	4	0	0	0	0	0	2	0	6	0
10	MF	(Brazil) Philippe Coutinho	3	0	1	0	0	0	0	0	4	0
20	MF	(England) Adam Lallana	4	0	0	0	0	0	0	0	4	0
24	MF	(Wales) Joe Allen	3	0	1	0	0	0	0	0	4	0
29	FW	(Italy) Fabio Borini	3	1	0	0	0	0	0	0	3	1
19	DF	(Spain) Javier Manquillo	3	0	0	0	0	0	0	0	3	0
2	DF	(England) Glen Johnson	2	0	0	0	0	0	0	0	2	0
9	FW	(England) Rickie Lambert	2	0	0	0	0	0	0	0	2	0
17	DF	(France) Mamadou Sakho	1	0	0	0	1	0	0	0	2	0
50	MF	(Serbia) Lazar Marković	0	0	0	0	0	0	0	1	0	1
4	DF	(Ivory Coast) Kolo Touré	0	0	0	0	1	0	0	0	1	0
22	GK	(Belgium) Simon Mignolet	0	0	1	0	0	0	0	0	1	0
Total			66	3	7	0	9	0	11	1	93	4

== Awards ==
=== Liverpool Players awards ===
The Players' Awards were held on 19 May at the Echo Arena.

- Liverpool Player's Player of the Year Award: Philippe Coutinho
- Liverpool Supporter's Player of the Year Award: Philippe Coutinho
- Liverpool Supporter's Young Player of the Year Award: Raheem Sterling
- Goal of the Season Award: Philippe Coutinho for his long range strike v Southampton, February 22.
- Performance of the Year: Philippe Coutinho v Manchester City, March 1
- Outstanding Achievement Award: Steven Gerrard
- Academy Players' Player of the Year: João Carlos Teixeira
- Lifetime Achievement Award: Ron Yeats and Ian St John

=== Liverpool Player of the Month award ===
Awarded monthly to the player that was chosen by fans voting on Liverpoolfc.com

Month	Player	Votes
August	(England) Raheem Sterling	54.8%
September	(England) Jordan Henderson	41.3%
October	(Brazil) Philippe Coutinho	50.7%
November	(Ivory Coast) Kolo Touré	
December	(Brazil) Philippe Coutinho	
January	(Brazil) Philippe Coutinho	
February	(Brazil) Philippe Coutinho	73%
March	(England) Jordan Henderson	34%
April	(Brazil) Philippe Coutinho	58%
