= Philippe Coutinho =

Brazilian footballer (born 1992)

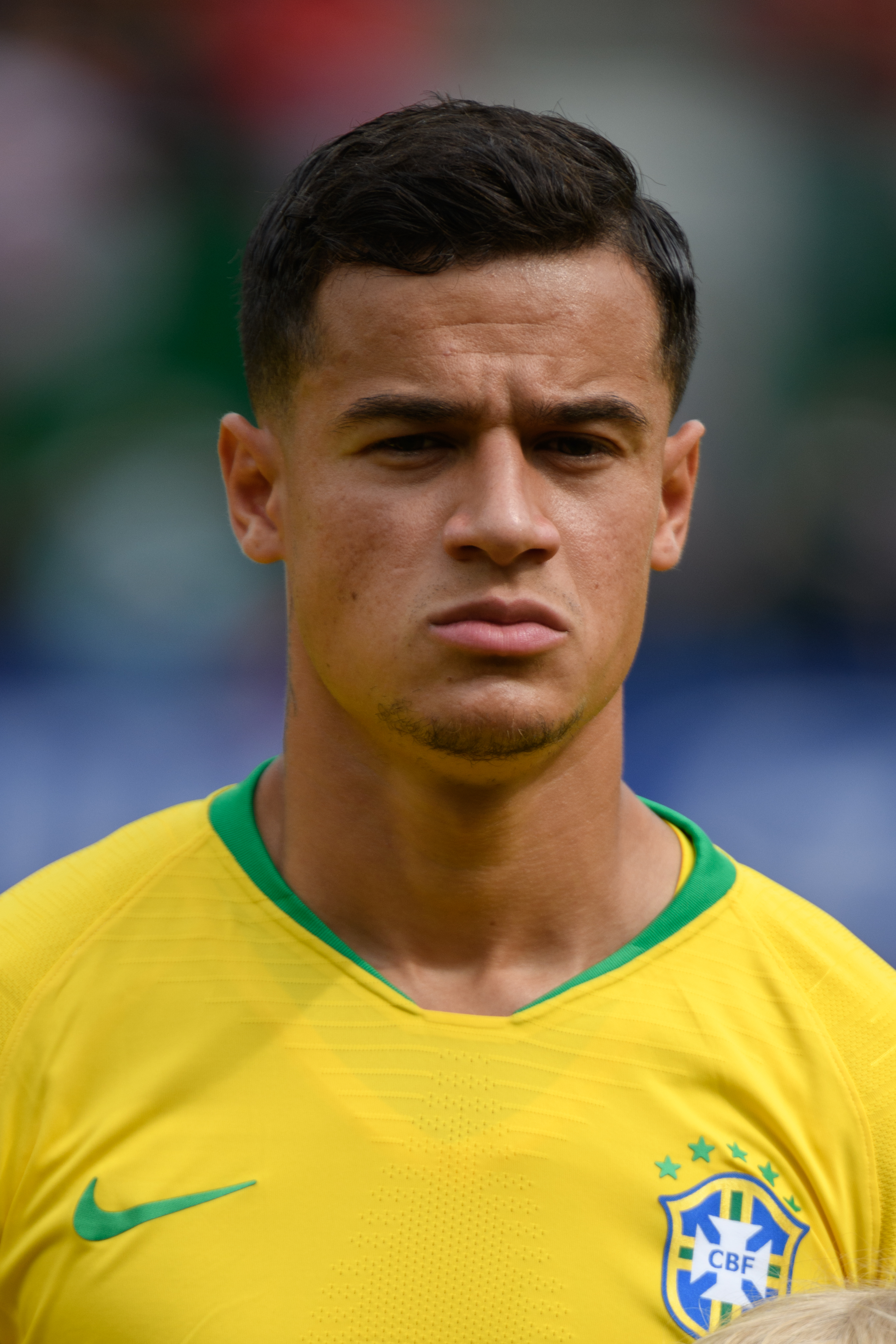
- Coutinho lining up for Brazil in 2018

Personal information
- Full name: Philippe Coutinho Correia
- Date of birth: 12 June 1992 (age 34)
- Place of birth: Rio de Janeiro, Brazil
- Height: 1.72 m (5 ft 8 in)
- Position: Attacking midfielder

Team information
- Current team: Santos
- Number: 11

Youth career
- 1999–2008: Vasco da Gama

Senior career*
Years	Team	Apps	(Gls)
2008–2013	Inter Milan	28	(3)
2008–2010	→ Vasco da Gama (loan)	36	(4)
2012–2013	→ Espanyol (loan)	16	(5)
2013–2018	Liverpool	152	(41)
2018–2022	Barcelona	76	(17)
2019–2020	→ Bayern Munich (loan)	23	(8)
2021–2022	→ Aston Villa (loan)	19	(5)
2022–2025	Aston Villa	22	(1)
2023–2024	→ Al-Duhail (loan)	16	(3)
2024–2025	→ Vasco da Gama (loan)	31	(5)
2025–2026	Vasco da Gama	29	(7)
2026–	Santos	8	(2)

International career
2009–2010	Brazil U17	3	(0)
2010–2011	Brazil U20	7	(3)
2010–2022	Brazil	68	(21)
Medal record
Men's football
Representing Brazil
Copa América
Winner	2019 Brazil
FIFA U-20 World Cup
Winner	2011 Colombia
South American U-17 Championship
Winner	2009 Chile
- * Club domestic league appearances and goals as of 19:13, 18 November 2026 (UTC)

Philippe Coutinho Correia (born 12 June 1992) is a Brazilian professional footballer who plays as an attacking midfielder for Campeonato Brasileiro Série A club Santos. He is known for his combination of vision, passing, dribbling, and ability to conjure curling long-range shots.

Coutinho showed prodigious talent and excelled in Vasco da Gama's youth system. He was signed by Serie A club Inter Milan in 2008 for €4 million and subsequently loaned back to Vasco, where he became a key player. He made his debut for Inter Milan in 2010, and was later loaned to La Liga club Espanyol in 2012. In January 2013, Coutinho joined Premier League club Liverpool. He flourished at Liverpool, being named in the PFA Team of the Year in 2015, and being named Liverpool's fans' and players' player of the year in 2015 and 2016. In 2016, the Football Supporters' Federation (FSF) awarded him its Player of the Year award.

In January 2018, Coutinho signed for Barcelona and won two La Liga titles with the club. He was loaned to German club Bayern Munich for the 2019–20 season. In the same season, Coutinho featured in Bayern's historic 8–2 victory over Barcelona in the UEFA Champions League quarter-finals, scoring twice against his parent club. Bayern ultimately completed the treble, with Coutinho winning his first Champions League title. He went on loan to Aston Villa in January 2022 before signing permanently for them in the summer.

Coutinho made his senior international debut for Brazil in 2010. He was part of the squad at the 2015 Copa América and the Copa América Centenario in 2016, and made his FIFA World Cup debut at the 2018 World Cup, in which he scored two goals and was later named in the World Cup All-Star Team. He was also a member of the Brazil team that won the 2019 Copa América on home soil.

== Early life ==
The third and youngest son of Esmeralda Coutinho and architect José Carlos Correia, Coutinho was born on 12 June 1992 in Rio de Janeiro. He was raised in Rio's northern Rocha district between an old shanty town and industrial warehouses.

As a child he was very shy and would prefer to be alone; he started playing football after watching his elder brothers Cristiano and Leandro play with their friends at a local concrete football pitch. He began playing futsal, and he said it helped him develop his skills as a footballer. Coutinho thrived in the street environment, developing skill and improvisation. After Coutinho joined a local football academy on the insistence of his friend's grandmother, his father was approached at a tournament by youth coaches at Vasco da Gama, where Coutinho attended a trial and joined their youth system.

== Club career ==
=== Vasco da Gama ===
Coutinho flourished in Vasco da Gama's youth system and was soon called up to the Brazil national under-14 team. In July 2008, at age 16, he signed for Serie A club Inter Milan for €4 million. Coutinho remained at Vasco on loan for two years as FIFA prohibited international transfer of footballers until they reached age 18, and he became a regular first-team player despite his young age. In 2009, he made 12 league appearances as Vasco won the Série B title and achieved promotion to the top tier. In 2010, he made 31 appearances and scored 5 goals in all competitions as he established himself as a key player.

=== Inter Milan ===
==== 2010–11 season ====
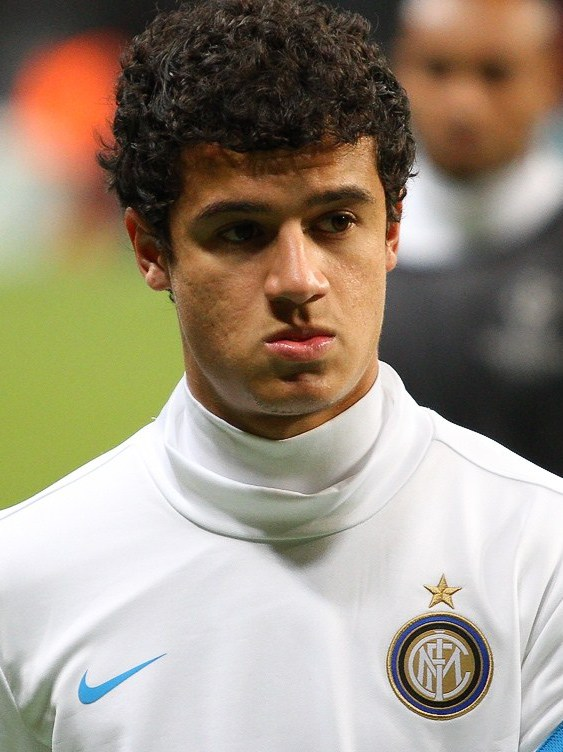
Coutinho with Inter Milan in 2011

Coutinho's move to Inter Milan became effective in July 2010, after he turned 18, with new manager Rafael Benítez being quoted as saying, "Coutinho is the future of Inter." On 27 August, Coutinho made his debut for Inter as a substitute during a 2–0 defeat to Atlético Madrid in the 2010 UEFA Super Cup. After dropping out of selection in the starting line-up, he returned to play in the crucial 3–2 win over Bayern Munich in Germany, which saw Inter progress to the quarter-final of the 2010–11 UEFA Champions League.

On 8 May 2011, in a 3–1 win at home against Fiorentina, Coutinho scored his first goal for Inter from a free kick that curled over the wall and into the net. His second goal for Inter came in a match against Cagliari on 19 November 2011, where Coutinho received a through-ball from teammate Ricky Álvarez and scored into the bottom left corner of the net to give Inter a 2–0 lead.

==== 2011–2013: Loan to Espanyol and return to Inter ====
During the 2011–12 season, Coutinho struggled to establish himself in Inter's team, leading him to join La Liga club Espanyol on 30 January 2012 on loan until the end of the season. He made his debut on 4 February, starting in a 3–3 draw with Athletic Bilbao. The following month, he scored his first goals for Espanyol side when he scored a two goals in a 5–1 victory against Rayo Vallecano. He scored 5 goals in 16 appearances during his loan with Espanyol before returning to Inter at the end of the season.

Following the expiry of his loan deal with Espanyol, Coutinho returned to Inter Milan but once again struggled to find game time at the San Siro, making just 10 league appearances and scoring one goal in the 2012–13 season.

=== Liverpool ===
==== 2012–13 season ====
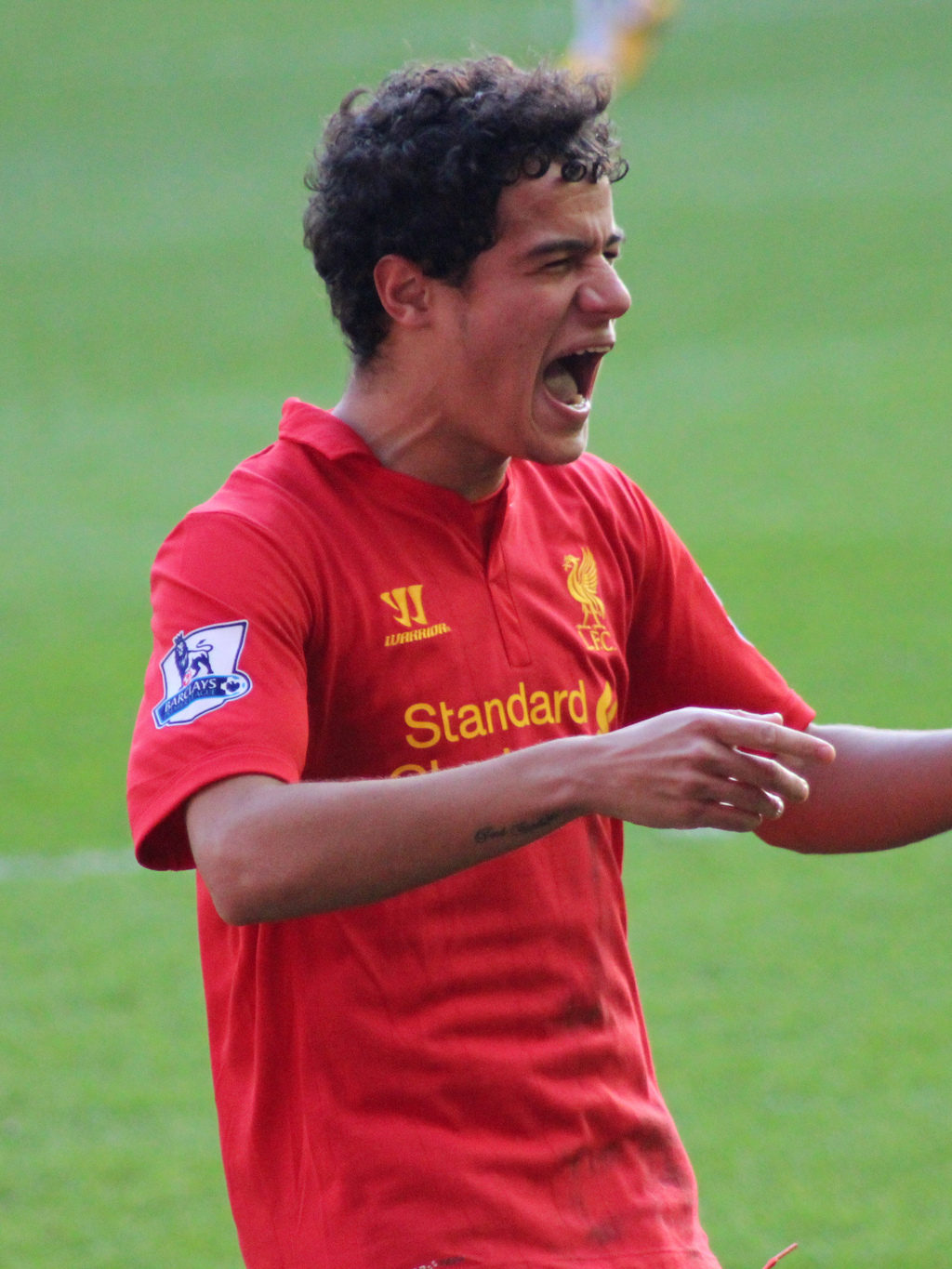
Coutinho playing for Liverpool in 2013

On 26 January 2013, Premier League club Liverpool agreed an £8.5 million transfer fee with Inter Milan for Coutinho, pending a medical exam and a work permit. Southampton had also expressed an interest but Coutinho said he would prefer to join Liverpool. On 30 January, Liverpool confirmed the signing of Coutinho on a long-term contract. The former director of football at Liverpool, Damien Comolli, later revealed Liverpool had scouted and ultimately signed Coutinho following a recommendation by then-Inter Milan manager and former Liverpool manager Rafael Benítez, who said the Brazilian would be "world class".

Coutinho made his Liverpool debut on 11 February 2013, as a 77th-minute substitute in a 2–0 home defeat against West Bromwich Albion. On 17 February, he scored his first goal for Liverpool on his full debut in a 5–0 home victory over Swansea City. On 2 March, he set up Liverpool's first and second goals in a 4–0 win over Wigan Athletic and followed on with a goal in a 3–1 away loss to Southampton and another assist in a 2–1 away win against Aston Villa. He was named Liverpool's Player of the Month for March.

Towards the end of April 2013, he was named man of the match for his performance in Liverpool's 6–0 away victory over Newcastle United, claiming two assists and winning the free kick from which Jordan Henderson scored Liverpool's sixth goal. Coutinho then scored Liverpool's final goal of the season against Queens Park Rangers, executing a driven shot from 30 yards out after being played in by Jordon Ibe. He ended the 2012–13 season with three goals in 13 Premier League appearances for Liverpool.

==== 2013–14 season ====
Coutinho began the 2013–14 season well before injuring his shoulder in a 2–2 draw with Swansea City on 16 September 2013. He was restored to the starting line-up for a 4–0 home victory over Fulham on 9 November. On 23 November, Coutinho scored the opening goal against Everton in the Merseyside derby in the first minute of the game. On 13 April 2014, Coutinho scored the winning goal in the 78th minute in a 3–2 win against Manchester City. The result put Liverpool seven points ahead of Manchester City at the top of the 2013–14 Premier League table with four matches remaining. However, Manchester City had six matches remaining and went on to win the title, with Liverpool finishing second.

During the season, Coutinho mainly played in central midfield and earned praise due to his long and accurate passing from midfield, dribbling skills and creative play to set up strikers Luis Suárez and Daniel Sturridge. Coutinho made 37 appearances and scored 5 goals for Liverpool in all competitions during the 2013–14 season.

==== 2014–15 season ====
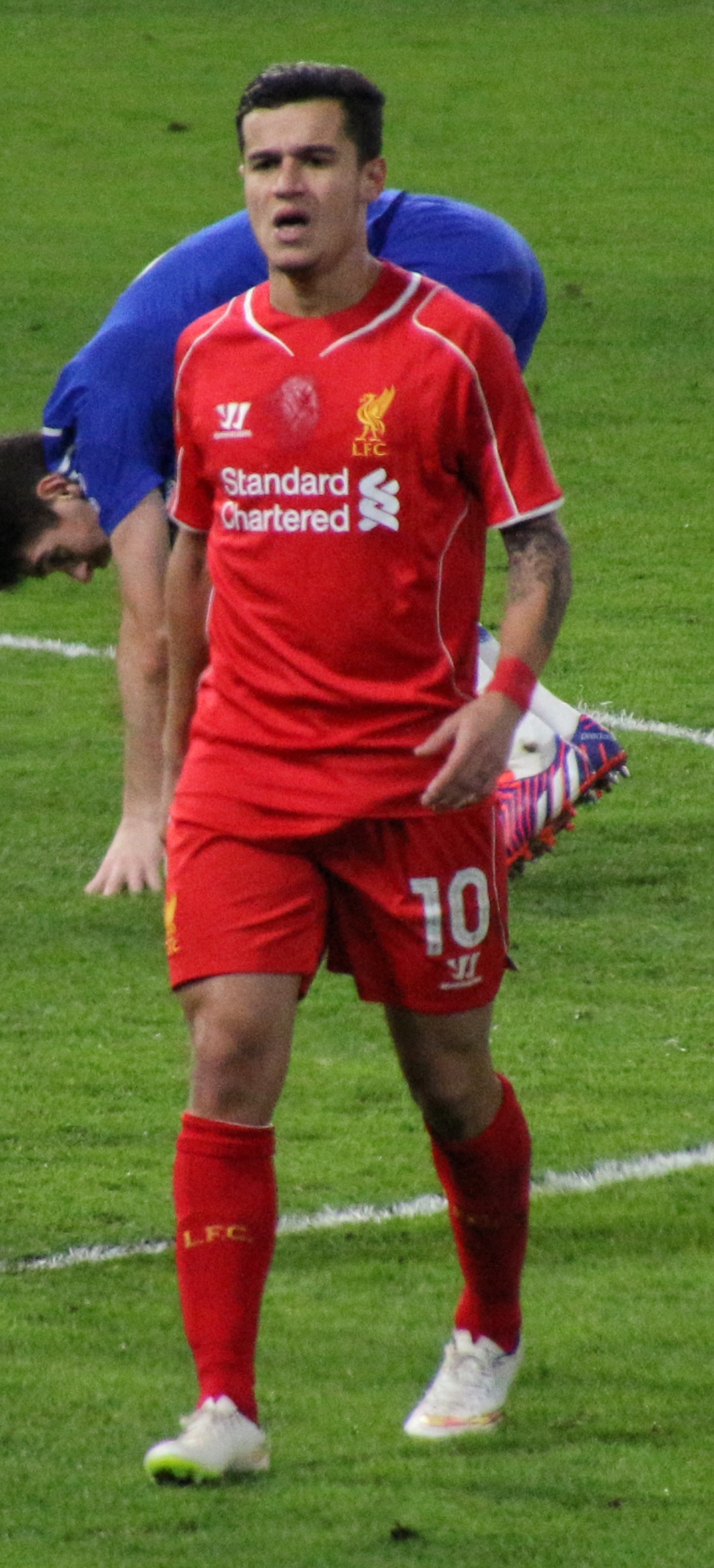
Coutinho playing for Liverpool in 2015

On 17 August 2014, Coutinho started in Liverpool's first match of the 2014–15 season, a 2–1 home win against Southampton. He created his first assist of the season in a 2–1 win against Swansea City in the fourth round of the 2014–15 League Cup, when he supplied the ball for Dejan Lovren to head the winning goal. Coutinho scored his first goal of the season on 19 October in a 3–2 away win against Queens Park Rangers after coming off the substitutes' bench.

Coutinho signed a new contract with Liverpool on 3 February 2015 to keep him at the club until June 2020. On 26 April, he was the only Liverpool player named in the PFA Team of the Year, and was named Liverpool's Player of the Season on 19 May. At the end of the season, he was shortlisted for the PFA Players' Player of the Year and the PFA Young Player of the Year, ultimately losing to Eden Hazard and Harry Kane, respectively.

==== 2015–16 season ====
On 9 August 2015, Coutinho scored the winning goal in the 86th minute with a curling 25-yard shot in Liverpool's first match of the 2015–16 Premier League, a 1–0 victory away to Stoke City. He was sent off on 29 August in a 3–0 home defeat to West Ham United, being booked the first time for dissent and the second for a foul on Dimitri Payet. On 31 October, he scored his first Liverpool brace, with two long-range shots in a 3–1 away victory over Chelsea. On 21 November, Coutinho scored in a 4–1 away victory over Manchester City, the first time he had scored in three consecutive Premier League matches.

On 5 January 2016, Coutinho suffered a hamstring injury in a 1–0 away win over Stoke City in the first leg of the 2015–16 League Cup semi-finals, which sidelined him for five weeks. On 9 February, he returned to score a goal to make it 1–1 against West Ham United in the 2015–16 FA Cup, although Liverpool lost 2–1 after extra time. In the 2016 League Cup final on 28 February, Coutinho scored an 83rd-minute equaliser in a 1–1 draw against Manchester City. However, in the subsequent penalty shoot-out, his "hesitant" attempt was one of three saved by victorious City goalkeeper Willy Caballero. On 17 March, Coutinho scored Liverpool's goal in a 1–1 away draw with Manchester United, helping Liverpool to a 3–1 aggregate victory to progress to the quarter-final of the 2015–16 UEFA Europa League. On 13 April, Coutinho was one of six players nominated for the 2015–16 PFA Young Player of the Year award. He played in Liverpool's 3–1 defeat to Sevilla in the 2016 Europa League final on 18 May at St. Jakob-Park.

==== 2016–17 season ====
Coutinho scored twice in Liverpool's 2016–17 Premier League season opener on 14 August 2016 in a 4–3 win against Arsenal. His first goal was a curling 30-yard free kick to equalise at the end of the first half. He was voted man of the match for three successive matches for Liverpool against West Bromwich Albion, Crystal Palace and Watford. After 11 league matches, Liverpool reached the top of the table for the first time since May 2014, with Coutinho having played an important role. On 26 November, Coutinho suffered ankle ligament damage in the first half of a 2–0 win against Sunderland. He missed six weeks, returning to action on 11 January against Southampton in the 2016–17 EFL Cup semi-final first leg.

In January 2017, Coutinho signed a new five-year contract with no release clause with Liverpool which would keep him at the club until June 2022. He was named man of the match for his performance on 1 April 2017 in a 3–1 victory over Everton after scoring and assisting a goal. Coutinho became the leading Brazilian goalscorer in Premier League history after scoring his 30th Premier League goal in a win against Stoke City, overtaking Juninho.

==== 2017–18 season ====
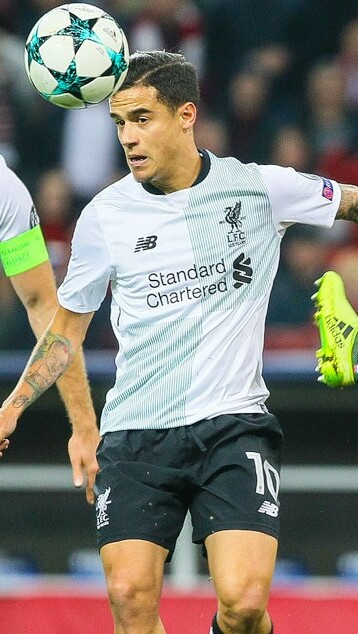
Coutinho playing for Liverpool in 2017

In August 2017, Liverpool rejected a £72 million bid from Barcelona for Coutinho, prompting him to submit a transfer request. Two more improved bids from Barcelona were rejected, leading one of their directors, Albert Soler, to claim Liverpool wanted £183 million for Coutinho, which Liverpool denied. Coutinho made his first appearance of the 2017–18 season for Liverpool on 13 September, coming on as a substitute in the 75th minute of a 2–2 draw against Sevilla in the 2017–18 Champions League. He scored his first goal of the 2017–18 Premier League on 23 September in a 3–2 victory away to Leicester City.

On 6 December, Coutinho captained Liverpool for the first time in the absence of Jordan Henderson in a 7–0 home win against Spartak Moscow in the final group stage match of the season's Champions League, in which he scored his first hat-trick for the club. His second goal, a tap-in from Roberto Firmino's pass, was his 50th career goal for Liverpool in all competitions. Later that month, he opened the scoring in a 4–0 away win over AFC Bournemouth as Liverpool become the first team in Premier League history to win four consecutive league matches by at least a three-goal margin. On 26 December, he captained Liverpool in his 200th appearance for the club, scoring once and providing an assist in a 5–0 league win over Swansea City to score his third goal in as many league matches.

Coutinho played what transpired to be his final match for Liverpool on 30 December 2017, featuring prominently in a 2–1 home win against Leicester City. On 31 December, sportswear company Nike—Coutinho and Barcelona's sponsor—advertised Coutinho's image on the back of a Barcelona shirt, despite Coutinho still being a Liverpool player at the time. Coutinho was omitted from the Liverpool squad to face Burnley on 1 January 2018 with a minor thigh injury. He left Liverpool having registered 12 goals and nine assists in 20 appearances for the club in the 2017–18 season.

=== Barcelona ===
==== 2018–2019: Two La Liga titles and domestic trophies ====
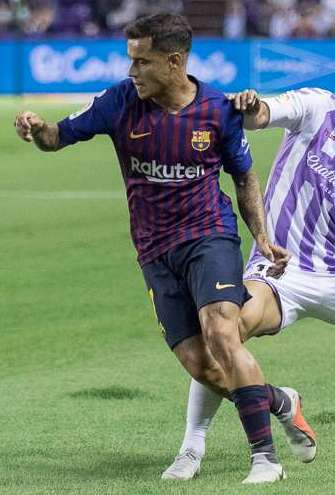
Coutinho playing for Barcelona in 2018

On 6 January 2018, Liverpool confirmed they had reached an agreement with La Liga club Barcelona for the transfer of Coutinho. His transfer fee was reported to be an initial £105 million rising to £142 million with various clauses being met. During his medical, he was diagnosed with a thigh injury sustained a few days before joining Barcelona, meaning that he would be out for three weeks. Coutinho made his debut on 25 January, in a 2–0 (2–1 on aggregate) win against Espanyol in the quarter-final of the 2017–18 Copa del Rey, coming on as a 68th-minute substitute. Assisted by Luis Suárez, Coutinho scored his first Barcelona goal on 8 February against Valencia in the second leg of the Copa del Rey semi-finals just four minutes after coming on as a half-time substitute.

On 28 October 2018, Coutinho scored his first El Clásico goal in a 5–1 win against Real Madrid. He scored his first Champions League goal with Barcelona on 4 October in a 4–2 away win against Tottenham Hotspur. On 16 April 2019, Coutinho scored a goal in a 3–0 win over Manchester United in the Champions League quarter-finals, which he celebrated by putting his fingers in his ears and closing his eyes in response to recent criticism from fans. Former Barcelona player Rivaldo commented on the incident, saying: "It was not a good gesture. He scored a great goal, but it's never good to do something like that to the fans", then he added, "The supporters criticise him because they know he has to give more. I don't know what happened to him during the week, what he read in the newspapers or saw on television, but you have to keep working, think about the next game and score goals. If he scores everything will change and he will be a player for the club." However, Coutinho won his second La Liga title with Barcelona in the 2018–19 season, in which he played 54 matches in all competitions, scoring 11 goals.

==== 2019–2021: Loan to Bayern Munich and return to Barcelona ====
On 19 August 2019, Coutinho joined Bundesliga club Bayern Munich on loan for the 2019–20 season. Bayern paid a loan fee of €8.5 million plus Coutinho's wages. Bayern reportedly had the option to sign Coutinho on a permanent contract in the summer of 2020 for €120 million. He made his debut on 24 August in a 3–0 win away to Schalke 04, in which he came on as a 57th-minute substitute. On 21 September, he scored his first goal for Bayern in a 4–0 win against 1. FC Köln. Coutinho said in a press conference that he was happy at Bayern Munich and intended to stay there. Coutinho scored his first hat-trick for Bayern Munich on 14 December in a 6–1 win over Werder Bremen. On 14 August 2020, Coutinho came on in the second half of their Champions League quarter-final match against his parent club Barcelona, assisting Robert Lewandowski in the 82nd minute for the sixth goal and scoring the last two goals in the 85th and 89th minutes to complete an 8–2 victory. Coutinho came on as a substitute in the 2020 Champions League final, in which Bayern beat Paris Saint-Germain 1–0, which was the club's second treble of Bundesliga, DFB-Pokal and Champions League titles.

Coutinho returned to Barcelona with the arrival of new coach Ronald Koeman. On 4 October 2020, he scored his first goal of the 2020–21 season in a 1–1 draw against Sevilla. On 29 December, he suffered a knee injury in a 1–1 draw against Eibar and missed the remainder of the season.

=== Aston Villa ===
On 7 January 2022, 29-year-old Coutinho joined Premier League club Aston Villa on loan for the remainder of the 2021–22 season, reuniting with former Liverpool teammate Steven Gerrard, Aston Villa's manager. Coutinho made his debut on 15 January as a 70th-minute substitute against Manchester United, scoring the equaliser in a 2–2 home draw. On 12 May 2022, Coutinho signed for Aston Villa permanently for an undisclosed transfer fee, reported to be £17 million, on a four-year contract.

==== Loan to Al-Duhail ====
On 8 September 2023, Coutinho joined Qatar Stars League club Al-Duhail on loan for the 2023–24 season. On 28 September 2023, Coutinho scored on his debut in Qatari football, in a 2–1 away victory over Al-Markhiya.

=== Return to Vasco da Gama ===
On 10 July 2024, Coutinho re-joined boyhood club Vasco da Gama on a season-long loan. On 4 July 2025, the move became permanent after he reached an agreement to terminate his contract with Aston Villa. On 18 February 2026, Coutinho left Vasco citing pressure from fans and mental exhaustion.

=== Santos ===
On 14 September 2026, Coutinho joined Campeonato Brasileiro Série A side Santos for the remainder of the 2026 season, reuniting with former Brazilian teammate Neymar. He made his club debut on 2 October, replacing Álvaro Barreal at half-time in a 2–1 away win over São Paulo, and taking part of the play which resulted in Gabriel Barbosa's winner.

Coutinho scored his first goal for Peixe on 18 October 2026, netting the winner in a 2–1 away success over Fluminense.

== International career ==
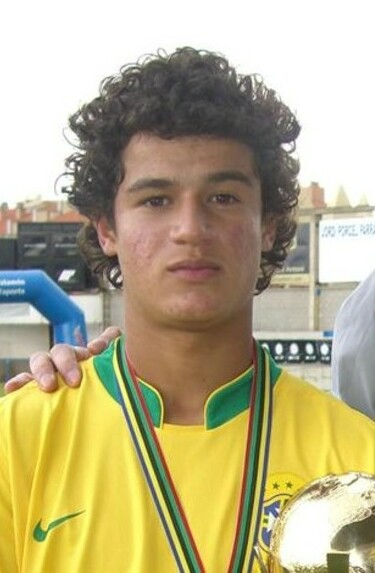
Coutinho with the Brazil national under-15 team in 2007

Having made youth appearances for Brazil from the under-14 team upwards, Coutinho became a key player in the Brazil squad that won the 2009 South American U-17 Championship, scoring three goals.

The 18-year-old made his debut for the Brazil national team on 7 October 2010, starting in a friendly match against Iran. He was omitted from the squad for the 2014 FIFA World Cup in Brazil by manager Luiz Felipe Scolari. On 19 August 2014, Coutinho was called up to the national squad by new Brazil manager Dunga for the friendly matches against Colombia and Ecuador in September, and played the final 25 minutes of the match against Ecuador. On 29 March 2015, he was selected to start in Brazil's 1–0 friendly victory over Chile in London. Coutinho was included in Brazil's squad for the 2015 Copa América, and he scored his first international goal on 7 June during a 2–0 friendly win over Mexico at Allianz Parque.

In May 2016, Coutinho was included in Brazil's squad for the Copa América Centenario in the United States. On 8 June, in the second group match at the Camping World Stadium, he scored a hat-trick in a 7–1 win against Haiti. Brazil did not advance past the group stage after losing 1–0 to Peru. On 28 March 2017, Coutinho scored in a 3–0 win against Paraguay that ensured Brazil qualified for the 2018 World Cup.

Coutinho was named in the Brazil squad for the 2018 World Cup in Russia. On 17 June 2018, he scored on his World Cup debut with a right-footed curling shot from outside the penalty area into the corner of the goal in Brazil's 1–1 draw with Switzerland in the group stage. In the following match against Costa Rica on 22 June, he scored the opening goal in injury time of the second half and was named man of the match as Brazil won 2–0. On 6 July, he assisted Renato Augusto's goal in a 2–1 quarter-final defeat to Belgium as Brazil were eliminated from the World Cup.

In May 2019, Coutinho was included in Brazil's squad for the 2019 Copa América on home soil. He earned his 50th cap for Brazil in the tournament's opening match on 14 June, and scored twice in a 3–0 win over Bolivia. He played in Brazil's 3–1 win over Peru in the final on 7 July at the Maracanã Stadium, helping the national team to their first major trophy in 12 years.

Coutinho missed the 2021 Copa América in Brazil due to a knee injury. After going through 2021 without making an international appearance, Coutinho returned to the national team's line-up for 2022 World Cup qualifiers in early 2022, scoring against Paraguay and Chile. On 6 November, however, it was announced that he had suffered a muscular injury that would rule him out of the tournament.

== Style of play ==
Considered to be an archetypal Brazilian number 10 advanced playmaker, Coutinho has been used as an attacking midfielder, second striker, as a central midfielder in a number 8 role, and even as a wide attacking midfielder on the wing, where he excels at providing assists for teammates. At his peak, Coutinho was regarded as one of the best players in his position.

Due to his dribbling ability, pace and agility, he has been compared to Lionel Messi and Ronaldinho by his former Espanyol manager Mauricio Pochettino, who also said, "Philippe... he has a special magic in his feet." Former Brazilian striker Careca has also compared Coutinho to Zico due to his creativity, and was highly praised by his Liverpool teammates.

Coutinho's elite vision and passing ability earned him the nickname "Little Magician" by Liverpool fans and his precocious ability has also led his team's supporters to give him the nickname "The Kid". Although naturally right-footed, Coutinho is capable of playing with both feet and can strike the ball particularly well from distance. He has a penchant for scoring from curling shots with his right foot from just outside or well outside the penalty area, especially after cutting inside from the left flank, and placing the ball into the top corner of the goal, which has led his former Liverpool manager Jürgen Klopp to compare him to Alessandro Del Piero. He is also a highly accurate free kick taker.

== Personal life ==
When Coutinho moved to Italy at age 18 to join Inter Milan, he was joined there by his parents and his girlfriend Ainê, whom he had first met at a friend's party. On moving to Espanyol, his parents returned to Brazil. He married Ainê in 2012 in Brazil. The couple have two daughters and one son. Coutinho has tattoos down his arms which form tributes to his family and his wife. He is a Christian.

During the early morning hours of 20 February 2018, Coutinho found his Barcelona home burgled. He had been out eating dinner with his family, and he was having construction work done on his house, which made it easier for burglars to break in.

In August 2018, Coutinho gained a Portuguese passport through his wife, making him no longer a non-EU player.

== Career statistics ==
=== Club ===
As of match played 18 November 2026

Appearances and goals by club, season and competition
Club	Season	League			National cup (Note: Includes Copa do Brasil, FA Cup, Copa del Rey, DFB-Pokal, Emir of Qatar Cup)		League cup (Note: Includes Football League Cup/EFL Cup, Qatari Stars Cup)		Continental		Other		Total	
Club	Season	Division	Apps	Goals	Apps	Goals	Apps	Goals	Apps	Goals	Apps	Goals	Apps	Goals
Vasco da Gama (loan)	2009	Série B	12	0	0	0	—		—		0	0	12	0
Vasco da Gama (loan)	2010	Série A	7	1	7	1	—		—		17 (Note: Appearances in Campeonato Carioca)	3	31	5
Vasco da Gama (loan)	Total		19	1	7	1	—		—		17	3	43	5
Inter Milan	2010–11	Serie A	13	1	0	0	—		6 (Note: Appearances in UEFA Champions League)	0	1 (Note: Appearance in UEFA Super Cup)	0	20	1
Inter Milan	2011–12	Serie A	5	1	0	0	—		3	0	0	0	8	1
Inter Milan	2012–13	Serie A	10	1	0	0	—		9 (Note: Appearances in UEFA Europa League)	2	—		19	3
Inter Milan	Total		28	3	0	0	—		18	2	1	0	47	5
Espanyol (loan)	2011–12	La Liga	16	5	—		—		—		—		16	5
Liverpool	2012–13	Premier League	13	3	—		—		—		—		13	3
Liverpool	2013–14	Premier League	33	5	3	0	1	0	—		—		37	5
Liverpool	2014–15	Premier League	35	5	7	3	4	0	6 (Note: Five appearances in UEFA Champions League, one appearance in UEFA Europa League)	0	—		52	8
Liverpool	2015–16	Premier League	26	8	1	1	3	1	13	2	—		43	12
Liverpool	2016–17	Premier League	31	13	2	0	3	1	—		—		36	14
Liverpool	2017–18	Premier League	14	7	0	0	1	0	5	5	—		20	12
Liverpool	Total		152	41	13	4	12	2	24	7	—		201	54
Barcelona	2017–18	La Liga	18	8	4	2	—		—		—		22	10
Barcelona	2018–19	La Liga	34	5	7	3	—		12	3	1 (Note: Appearance in Supercopa de España)	0	54	11
Barcelona	2020–21	La Liga	12	2	0	0	—		2	1	0	0	14	3
Barcelona	2021–22	La Liga	12	2	0	0	—		4	0	0	0	16	2
Barcelona	Total		76	17	11	5	—		18	4	1	0	106	26
Bayern Munich (loan)	2019–20	Bundesliga	23	8	4	0	—		11	3	—		38	11
Aston Villa (loan)	2021–22	Premier League	19	5	—		—		—		—		19	5
Aston Villa	2022–23	Premier League	20	1	1	0	1	0	—		—		22	1
Aston Villa	2023–24	Premier League	2	0	—		—		0	0	—		2	0
Aston Villa	Total		41	6	1	0	1	0	0	0	—		43	6
Al-Duhail (loan)	2023–24	Qatar Stars League	16	3	3	2	1	1	3 (Note: Appearances in AFC Champions League)	2	—		23	8
Vasco da Gama (loan)	2024	Série A	15	2	3	1	—		—		—		18	3
Vasco da Gama	2025 (Note: Part of this season was spent on loan from Aston Villa)	Série A	30	5	12	3	—		6 (Note: Appearances in Copa Sudamericana)	1	8	2	56	11
Vasco da Gama	2026	Série A	3	1	—		—		—		4	2	7	3
Vasco da Gama	Total		48	8	15	4	—		6	1	12	4	81	17
Santos	2026	Série A	8	2	—		—		0	0	—		8	2
Career total			427	94	54	16	14	3	80	19	31	7	606	139

=== International ===
Appearances and goals by national team and year
National team	Year	Apps	Goals
Brazil	2010	1	0
Brazil	2011	0	0
Brazil	2012	0	0
Brazil	2013	0	0
Brazil	2014	4	0
Brazil	2015	7	1
Brazil	2016	11	5
Brazil	2017	9	2
Brazil	2018	13	5
Brazil	2019	16	4
Brazil	2020	2	1
Brazil	2021	0	0
Brazil	2022	5	3
Total		68	21

As of match played 2 June 2022
Scores and results list Brazil's goal tally first, score column indicates score after each Coutinho goal

List of international goals scored by Philippe Coutinho
No.	Date	Venue	Cap	Opponent	Score	Result	Competition	Ref.
1	7 June 2015	Allianz Parque, São Paulo, Brazil	7	Mexico	1–0	2–0	Friendly	
2	8 June 2016	Camping World Stadium, Orlando, United States	16	Haiti	1–0	7–1	Copa América Centenario	
3	8 June 2016	Camping World Stadium, Orlando, United States	16	Haiti	2–0	7–1	Copa América Centenario	
4	8 June 2016	Camping World Stadium, Orlando, United States	16	Haiti	7–1	7–1	Copa América Centenario	
5	6 October 2016	Arena das Dunas, Natal, Brazil	20	Bolivia	2–0	5–0	2018 FIFA World Cup qualification	
6	10 November 2016	Mineirão, Belo Horizonte, Brazil	22	Argentina	1–0	3–0	2018 FIFA World Cup qualification	
7	28 March 2017	Arena Corinthians, São Paulo, Brazil	25	Paraguay	1–0	3–0	2018 FIFA World Cup qualification	
8	31 August 2017	Arena do Grêmio, Porto Alegre, Brazil	28	Ecuador	2–0	2–0	2018 FIFA World Cup qualification	
9	23 March 2018	Luzhniki Stadium, Moscow, Russia	33	Russia	2–0	3–0	Friendly	
10	10 June 2018	Ernst-Happel-Stadion, Vienna, Austria	36	Austria	3–0	3–0	Friendly	
11	17 June 2018	Rostov Arena, Rostov-on-Don, Russia	37	Switzerland	1–0	1–1	2018 FIFA World Cup	
12	22 June 2018	Krestovsky Stadium, Saint Petersburg, Russia	38	Costa Rica	1–0	2–0	2018 FIFA World Cup	
13	11 September 2018	FedExField, Landover, United States	43	El Salvador	3–0	5–0	Friendly	
14	9 June 2019	Estádio Beira-Rio, Porto Alegre, Brazil	49	Honduras	3–0	7–0	Friendly	
15	14 June 2019	Estádio do Morumbi, São Paulo, Brazil	50	Bolivia	1–0	3–0	2019 Copa América	
16	14 June 2019	Estádio do Morumbi, São Paulo, Brazil	50	Bolivia	2–0	3–0	2019 Copa América	
17	19 November 2019	Mohammed bin Zayed Stadium, Abu Dhabi, United Arab Emirates	61	South Korea	2–0	3–0	Friendly	
18	9 October 2020	Arena Corinthians, São Paulo, Brazil	62	Bolivia	5–0	5–0	2022 FIFA World Cup qualification	
19	1 February 2022	Mineirão, Belo Horizonte, Brazil	65	Paraguay	2–0	4–0	2022 FIFA World Cup qualification	
20	24 March 2022	Maracanã Stadium, Rio de Janeiro, Brazil	66	Chile	3–0	4–0	2022 FIFA World Cup qualification	
21	2 June 2022	Seoul World Cup Stadium, Seoul, South Korea	68	South Korea	4–1	5–1	Friendly	

== Honours ==
Vasco da Gama

- Campeonato Brasileiro Série B: 2009
- Copa do Brasil runner-up: 2025

Inter Milan

- Supercoppa Italiana: 2010

Liverpool

- Football League Cup runner-up: 2015–16
- UEFA Europa League runner-up: 2015–16

Barcelona

- La Liga: 2017–18, 2018–19
- Copa del Rey: 2017–18; runner-up: 2018–19
- Supercopa de España: 2018

Bayern Munich

- Bundesliga: 2019–20
- DFB-Pokal: 2019–20
- UEFA Champions League: 2019–20

Brazil U17

- South American U-17 Championship: 2009

Brazil U20

- FIFA U-20 World Cup: 2011

Brazil

- Copa América: 2019

Individual

- PFA Team of the Year: 2014–15 Premier League
- UEFA Europa League Squad of the Season: 2015–16
- Liverpool Fans' Player of the Season Award: 2014–15, 2015–16
- Liverpool Players' Player of the Season Award: 2014–15, 2015–16
- Liverpool Goal of the Season: 2014–15, 2015–16
- Liverpool Performance of the Season: 2014–15, 2015–16
- Premier League Player of the Year by Northwest Football Awards: 2016
- Samba Gold Award (Samba d'Or): 2016
- Football Supporters' Federation Player of the Year: 2016
- FIFA World Cup All-Star Team: 2018
- FIFA World Cup Dream Team: 2018
- Bundesliga Goal of the Month: December 2019
