= 2007–08 Southampton F.C. season =

Southampton
2007–08 season
- Chairman: Ken Dulieu (until 17 December); Leon Crouch (from 20 December)
- Manager: George Burley (until 23 January); John Gorman (24 January – 19 February); Nigel Pearson (from 19 February)
- Stadium: St Mary's Stadium
- Championship: 20th
- FA Cup: Fifth round
- League Cup: First round
- Top goalscorer: Stern John (19 goals)
- Average home league attendance: 21,081
| Home colours | Away colours | Third colours |

During the 2007–08 English football season, Southampton F.C. competed in the Football League Championship.

== Season summary ==
In the 2007–08 season, the Saints initially had an unremarkable campaign, with the club in mid-table for the first half of the campaign. Once again though, Southampton experienced a major loss of form in the spring, not helped by managerial instability caused by the resignation of George Burley followed by caretaker spells by John Gorman and then Nigel Pearson, and were left in serious danger of relegation to League One on the last day of the season. However, a win combined with some other favourable results ensured their survival for another season in the Championship.

== Final league table ==
| Pos | Team | Pld | W | D | L | GF | GA | GD | Pts | Promotion, qualification or relegation |
|---|---|---|---|---|---|---|---|---|---|---|
| 18 | Barnsley | 46 | 14 | 13 | 19 | 52 | 65 | −13 | 55 | |
| 19 | Blackpool | 46 | 12 | 18 | 16 | 59 | 64 | −5 | 54 | |
| 20 | Southampton | 46 | 13 | 15 | 18 | 56 | 72 | −16 | 54 | |
| 21 | Coventry City | 46 | 14 | 11 | 21 | 52 | 64 | −12 | 53 | |
| 22 | Leicester City (R) | 46 | 12 | 16 | 18 | 42 | 45 | −3 | 52 | Relegation to Football League One |

Updated to match(es) played on 4 May 2008. Source: The Football League
Rules for classification: 1) points; 2) goal difference; 3) number of goals scored.
(R) Relegated

== Results ==
Southampton's score comes first

=== Legend ===
| Win | Draw | Loss |

=== Football League Championship ===
| Date | Opponent | Venue | Result | Attendance | Scorers |
|---|---|---|---|---|---|
| 11 August 2007 | Crystal Palace | H | 1–4 | 25,054 | Saganowski |
| 18 August 2007 | Norwich City | A | 1–2 | 24,004 | Jones |
| 25 August 2007 | Stoke City | H | 3–2 | 20,300 | Surman, Rasiak, Viáfara |
| 1 September 2007 | Queens Park Rangers | A | 3–0 | 15,560 | Rasiak (2), Wright-Phillips |
| 16 September 2007 | Watford | A | 2–3 | 15,915 | Rasiak, Dyer |
| 19 September 2007 | Colchester United | H | 1–1 | 18,773 | Wright-Phillips |
| 22 September 2007 | Barnsley | H | 2–3 | 19,151 | Saganowski, Idiakez |
| 29 September 2007 | Sheffield United | A | 2–1 | 24,561 | Rasiak, Viáfara |
| 2 October 2007 | Preston North End | A | 1–5 | 10,279 | Jones (own goal) |
| 6 October 2007 | West Bromwich Albion | H | 3–2 | 21,967 | John (2), Skácel |
| 21 October 2007 | Cardiff City | H | 1–0 | 20,796 | John |
| 24 October 2007 | Bristol City | A | 1–2 | 18,326 | McAllister (own goal) |
| 27 October 2007 | Burnley | A | 3–2 | 10,944 | Wright-Phillips, Euell, John |
| 3 November 2007 | Charlton Athletic | H | 0–1 | 23,363 | |
| 6 November 2007 | Wolverhampton Wanderers | H | 0–0 | 19,856 | |
| 10 November 2007 | Sheffield Wednesday | A | 0–5 | 19,442 | |
| 24 November 2007 | Blackpool | H | 1–0 | 21,075 | John |
| 27 November 2007 | Ipswich Town | A | 0–2 | 19,791 | |
| 1 December 2007 | Leicester City | A | 2–1 | 20,070 | John, Surman (pen) |
| 4 December 2007 | Sheffield Wednesday | H | 0–0 | 17,981 | |
| 8 December 2007 | Hull City | H | 4–0 | 18,125 | Wright-Phillips, John (3) |
| 15 December 2007 | Coventry City | A | 1–1 | 19,143 | Wright-Phillips |
| 22 December 2007 | Preston North End | H | 0–1 | 23,267 | |
| 26 December 2007 | Colchester United | A | 1–1 | 6,157 | Viáfara |
| 29 December 2007 | Barnsley | A | 2–2 | 10,425 | Wright-Phillips (2) |
| 1 January 2008 | Watford | H | 0–3 | 23,008 | |
| 12 January 2008 | Scunthorpe United | H | 1–0 | 18,416 | Rasiak |
| 19 January 2008 | Plymouth Argyle | A | 1–1 | 14,676 | Wright-Phillips |
| 29 January 2008 | Norwich City | H | 0–1 | 18,004 | |
| 2 February 2008 | Crystal Palace | A | 1–1 | 17,967 | John |
| 9 February 2008 | Queens Park Rangers | H | 2–3 | 22,205 | Powell, John |
| 12 February 2008 | Stoke City | A | 2–3 | 19,481 | John (2) |
| 19 February 2008 | Plymouth Argyle | H | 0–2 | 17,806 | |
| 23 February 2008 | Scunthorpe United | A | 1–1 | 6,035 | Vignal |
| 1 March 2008 | Ipswich Town | H | 1–1 | 23,299 | John |
| 4 March 2008 | Wolverhampton Wanderers | A | 2–2 | 21,795 | Vignal (pen), Euell |
| 8 March 2008 | Blackpool | A | 2–2 | 9,050 | Vignal, John |
| 11 March 2008 | Leicester City | H | 1–0 | 17,741 | John |
| 15 March 2008 | Hull City | A | 0–5 | 16,829 | |
| 22 March 2008 | Coventry City | H | 0–0 | 22,014 | |
| 29 March 2008 | Cardiff City | A | 0–1 | 12,955 | |
| 5 April 2008 | Bristol City | H | 2–0 | 22,890 | John, Euell |
| 12 April 2008 | Charlton Athletic | A | 1–1 | 26,206 | McCarthy (own goal) |
| 19 April 2008 | Burnley | H | 0–1 | 21,762 | |
| 28 April 2008 | West Bromwich Albion | A | 1–1 | 26,167 | Lallana |
| 4 May 2008 | Sheffield United | H | 3–2 | 31,957 | Saganowski, John (2) |

=== FA Cup ===
| Round | Date | Opponent | Venue | Result | Attendance | Goalscorers |
|---|---|---|---|---|---|---|
| R3 | 5 January 2008 | Leicester City | H | 2–0 | 20,094 | Surman, Vignal |
| R4 | 26 January 2008 | Bury | H | 2–0 | 25,449 | Surman, Rasiak |
| R5 | 16 February 2008 | Bristol Rovers | A | 0–1 | 11,920 | |

=== League Cup ===
| Round | Date | Opponent | Venue | Result | Attendance | Goalscorers |
|---|---|---|---|---|---|---|
| R1 | 13 August 2007 | Peterborough United | A | 1–2 | 4,087 | Rasiak |

== Squad ==
Note: Flags indicate national team as defined under FIFA eligibility rules; some limited exceptions apply. Players may hold more than one non-FIFA nationality.

| No. | Pos. | Nation | Player |
|---|---|---|---|
| 1 | GK | ENG | Richard Wright (on loan from West Ham United) |
| 2 | DF | SWE | Alexander Östlund |
| 3 | DF | ENG | Wayne Thomas |
| 4 | FW | POL | Marek Saganowski |
| 6 | DF | ENG | Darren Powell |
| 8 | FW | ENG | Bradley Wright-Phillips |
| 10 | MF | ENG | Jermaine Wright |
| 11 | MF | ENG | Andrew Surman |
| 12 | MF | CZE | Mario Lička |
| 13 | GK | POL | Bartosz Białkowski |
| 14 | MF | ENG | Adam Hammill (on loan from Liverpool) |
| 15 | FW | JAM | Jason Euell |
| 16 | MF | COL | Jhon Viáfara |
| 17 | FW | ENG | David McGoldrick |
| 18 | FW | ENG | Nathan Dyer |
| 20 | FW | ENG | Adam Lallana |

| No. | Pos. | Nation | Player |
|---|---|---|---|
| 21 | DF | FRA | Grégory Vignal (on loan from RC Lens) |
| 22 | MF | ENG | Simon Gillett |
| 23 | MF | WAL | Lloyd James |
| 24 | DF | ENG | Olly Lancashire |
| 25 | GK | ENG | Kelvin Davis |
| 26 | FW | FRA | Cédric Baseya |
| 27 | MF | ESP | Iñigo Idiakez |
| 28 | MF | ENG | Josh Dutton-Black |
| 29 | GK | ENG | Michael Poke |
| 30 | MF | MAR | Youssef Safri |
| 31 | FW | TRI | Stern John |
| 32 | GK | SVK | Andrej Pernecký |
| 34 | FW | CMR | Vincent Péricard (on loan from Stoke City) |
| 35 | DF | ENG | Andrew Davies |
| 36 | DF | ENG | Chris Perry (on loan from Luton Town) |
| 37 | DF | ENG | Chris Lucketti (on loan from Sheffield United) |

=== Left club during season ===
Note: Flags indicate national team as defined under FIFA eligibility rules; some limited exceptions apply. Players may hold more than one non-FIFA nationality.

| No. | Pos. | Nation | Player |
|---|---|---|---|
| 15 | FW | TRI | Kenwyne Jones (to Sunderland) |
| 33 | DF | SCO | Christian Dailly (on loan from West Ham United) |
| 34 | DF | ENG | Philip Ifil (on loan from Tottenham Hotspur) |
| 32 | DF | CMR | Lucien Mettomo (to Veria) |
| 29 | DF | IRL | Alan Bennett (on loan from Reading) |
| 9 | FW | POL | Grzegorz Rasiak (on loan to Bolton Wanderers) |

| No. | Pos. | Nation | Player |
|---|---|---|---|
| 7 | MF | CZE | Rudolf Skácel (on loan to Hertha BSC) |
| 29 | DF | IRL | Stephen O'Halloran (on loan from Aston Villa) |
| 5 | DF | NOR | Claus Lundekvam (Retired) |
| 33 | DF | ENG | Ian Pearce (on loan from Fulham) |
| 19 | DF | ENG | Chris Makin (Retired) |

== Transfers ==
=== In ===
| Date | Nationality | Position | Name | Club From | Fee |
|---|---|---|---|---|---|
| 28 June 2007 | (Poland) | FW | Marek Saganowski | Troyes | Undisclosed |
| 2 August 2007 | (Morocco) | MF | Youssef Safri | Norwich City | Undisclosed |
| 29 August 2007 | (Trinidad and Tobago) | FW | Stern John | Sunderland | Swap Deal |
| 31 August 2007 | (Jamaica) | FW | Jason Euell | Middlesbrough | Free |

=== Out ===
| Date | Nationality | Position | Name | Club To | Fee |
|---|---|---|---|---|---|
| 25 May 2007 | (Wales) | DF | Gareth Bale | Tottenham Hotspur | £5,000,000, rising to £10,000,000 |
| 26 June 2007 | (England) | DF | Martin Cranie | Portsmouth | Free |
| 12 July 2007 | (Northern Ireland) | DF | Chris Baird | Fulham | £3,025,000 |
| 9 August 2007 | (Cape Verde) | DF | Pelé | West Bromwich Albion | £1,000,000 |
| 29 August 2007 | (Trinidad and Tobago) | FW | Kenwyne Jones | Sunderland | £6,000,000 |

=== Loans In ===
| Date | Nationality | Position | Name | Club From | Length |
|---|---|---|---|---|---|
| 12 July 2007 | (England) | MF | Adam Hammilll | Liverpool | Full Season |
| 26 July 2007 | (France) | DF | Grégory Vignal | RC Lens | Full Season |
| 31 July 2007 | (Republic of Ireland) | DF | Alan Bennett | Reading | Six Months |
| 21 September 2007 | (Scotland) | DF | Christian Dailly | West Ham United | One Month |
| 28 September 2007 | (England) | DF | Philip Ifil | Tottenham Hotspur | Three Months |
| 16 January 2008 | (Republic of Ireland) | DF | Stephen O'Halloran | Aston Villa | One Month |
| 14 March 2008 | (Cameroon) | FW | Vincent Péricard | Stoke City | Until end of season |
| 20 March 2008 | (England) | GK | Richard Wright | West Ham United | One Month |

=== Loans Out ===
| Date | Nationality | Position | Name | Club To | Length |
|---|---|---|---|---|---|
| 31 January 2008 | (Poland) | FW | Grzegorz Rasiak | Bolton Wanderers | Until end of season |
| 31 January 2008 | (Czech Republic) | MF | Rudi Skácel | Hertha Berlin | Until end of season |
