= St Mary's Stadium =

Association football stadium in Southampton

- St Mary's

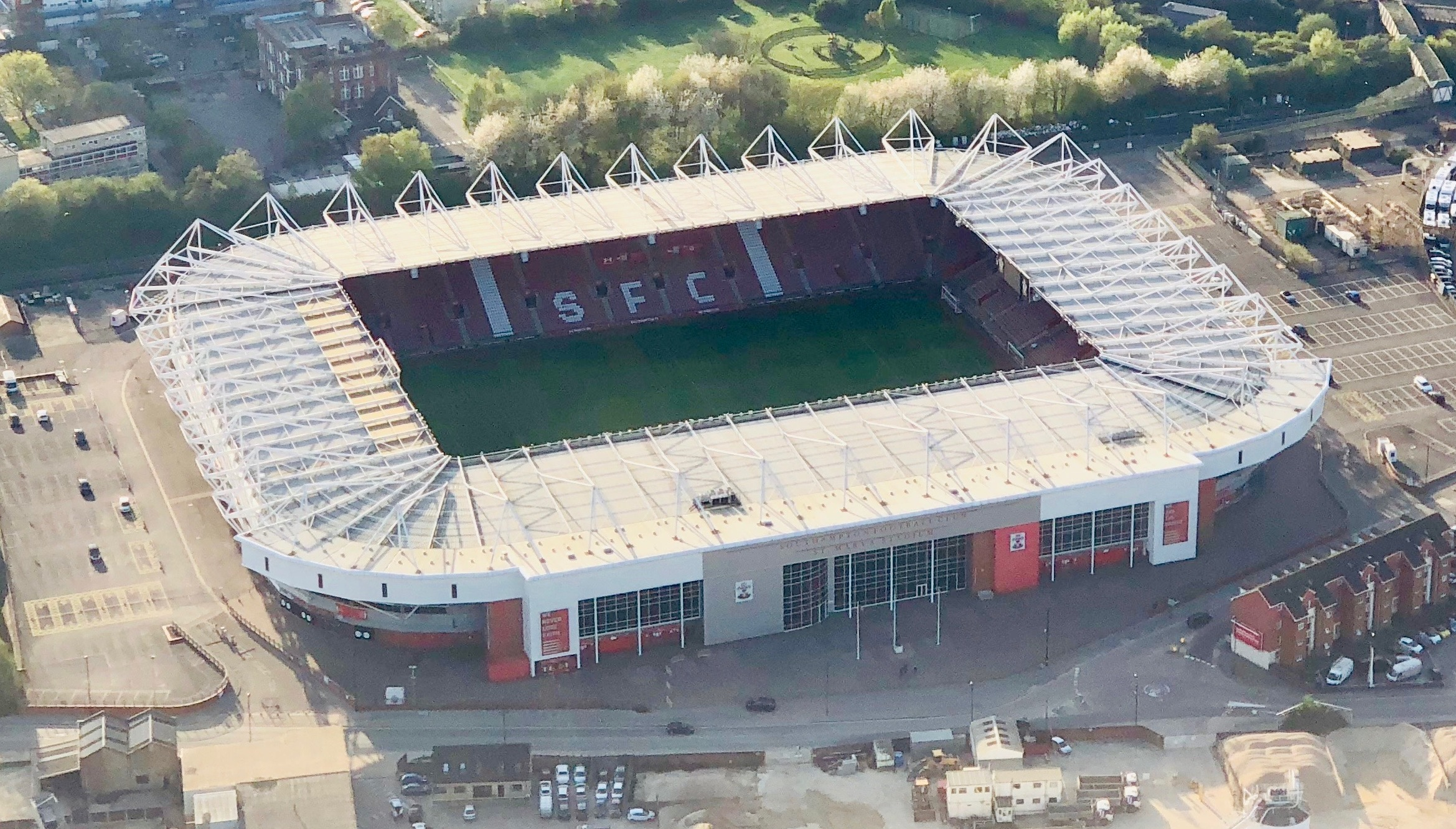
- UEFA

- Location of St Mary's
- Former names: The Friends Provident St. Mary's Stadium (2001–2006)
- Location: Britannia Rd, Southampton, England, SO14 5FP
- Coordinates: 50°54′21″N 1°23′28″W
- Operator: Southampton
- Capacity: 32,384
- Surface: Desso GrassMaster
- Record attendance: Football : 32,363 (Southampton v Coventry City, 28 April 2012); Concerts: 63,278 (Take That, 29-30 May 2026)
- Field size: 105 by 68 metres (115 yd × 74 yd)

Construction
- Groundbreaking: 2000
- Opened: 11 August 2001
- Cost: £32 million

Tenants
- Southampton (2001–present); Southampton Women (2022–): Major sporting events hosted; UEFA Women's Euro 2022 (Northern Ireland Group Stage)

St Mary's Stadium is a seated football stadium in Southampton, Hampshire, England. Since 2001, it has served as the home venue of EFL Championship club Southampton, following their move from The Dell. The stadium has a capacity of 32,384.

The Taylor Report on 29 January 1990 required all First and Second Division clubs to have all-seater stadiums by August 1994, Southampton's directors initially decided to upgrade The Dell into an all-seater stadium (which was completed in 1993) but speculation about relocation continued, especially as an all-seater Dell had a capacity of just over 15,000; despite this, Southampton continued to defy the odds and survive in the new FA Premier League after 1992.

After a lengthy and ultimately unsuccessful attempt to build a new 25,000-seater stadium and leisure complex at Stoneham, on the outskirts of Southampton, the city council offered the club the chance to build a new ground on the disused gas work site in the heart of the city, about one and half miles from The Dell.

The move was cited as the club returning home, because the club was formed by members of the nearby St. Mary's Church, as the football team of St. Mary's Church Young Men's Association before becoming Southampton St. Mary's, and eventually Southampton. Construction started in December 1999 and was completed at the end of July 2001, with work on the 32,689 seat stadium itself and improvements to local infrastructure costing a total of £32 million.

The Saints have been in residence since August 2001 when they moved from The Dell, which for the final years of its life, held just over 15,000 spectators – less than half the size of the new stadium. The first match was played on 1 August 2001 against Espanyol, with the Spanish club winning 4–3.

The first competitive hat trick at the stadium was scored by Stafford Browne for Aldershot Town in a 3–1 victory over Havant & Waterlooville in the Hampshire Senior Cup final on 1 May 2002.

In 2022, the stadium was used as one of the venues for the UEFA Women's Euro 2022, hosting Group A matches, which had the hosts England.

== Description ==
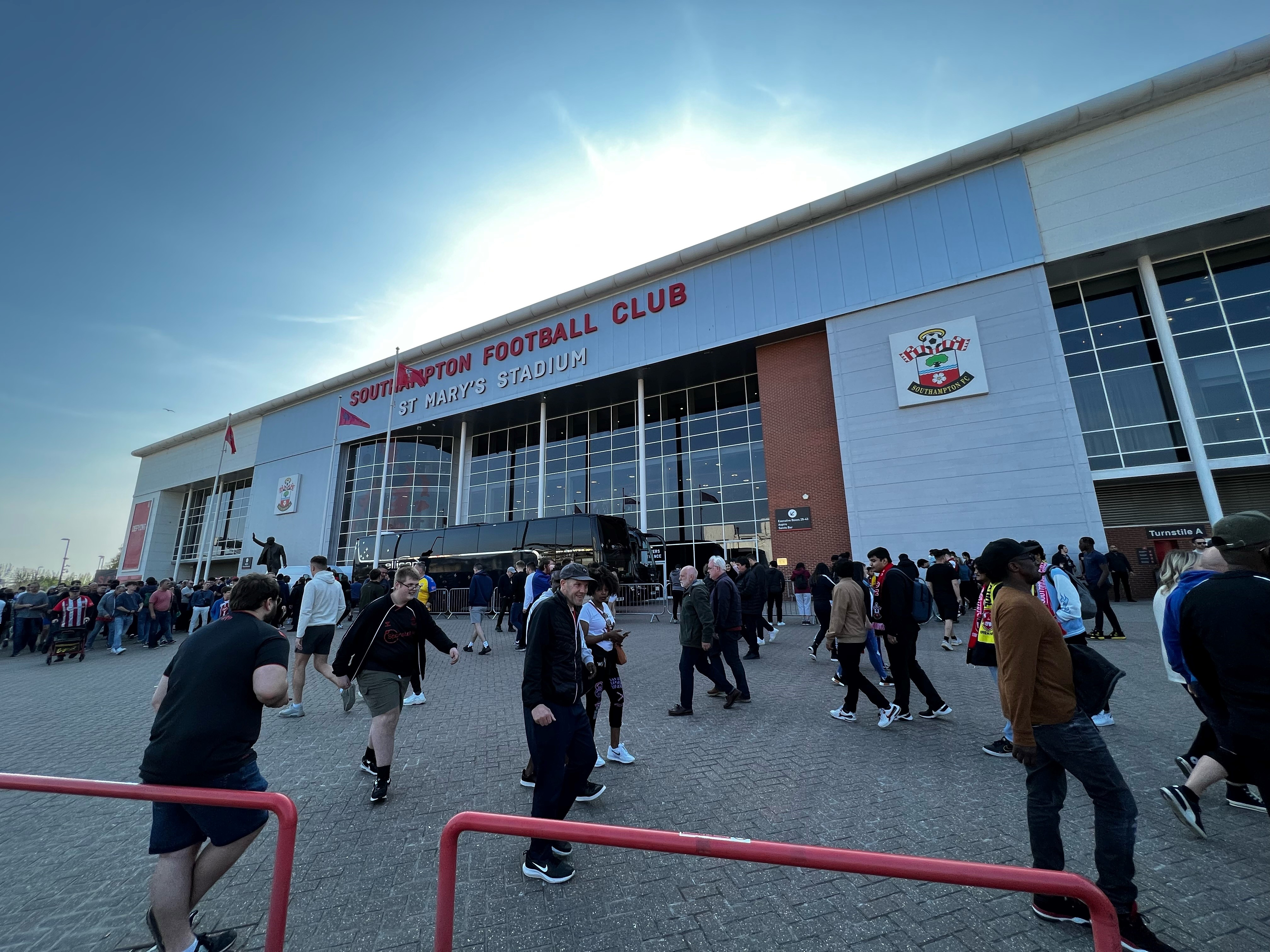
The exterior of the Itchen Stand at St Mary's Stadium in Southampton, April 2022

The stadium is a complete bowl, with all stands of equal height. There are two large screens at either end that can be seen from any seat.

The stadium has four stands, which are named after the areas of Southampton they face. The main (east) stand is the Itchen Stand, and faces the River Itchen. The opposite stand is called the Kingsland Stand. Behind the south goal is the Chapel Stand, and to the north is the Northam Stand.

At the rear of the Chapel, Kingsland and Northam Stands, there is a continuous, translucent 'panel' that is designed to allow light to access the pitch. A large section of the roof at the Chapel Stand, at the southern end of the stadium is also translucent, for the same reason.

At the rear of the Itchen Stand, there are 42 executive boxes, and a police control room. The stand also houses the club's offices, changing rooms, press facilities and corporate hospitality suites. The four main hospitality suites are named after some of Saints' greatest players:

- Terry Paine
- Mick Channon
- Bobby Stokes
- Matt Le Tissier

The Northam Stand is home to the majority of the more vocal supporters. Safe standing was installed in the Northam Stand partially in April 2024. The visiting supporters' section was also seated in this stand up until the 2023–24 season but is now located in the corner of the Kingsland and Chapel stands. Visitors can be given up to 4,250 seats (15 per cent of the capacity) for cup games, and up to 3,200 for league matches.

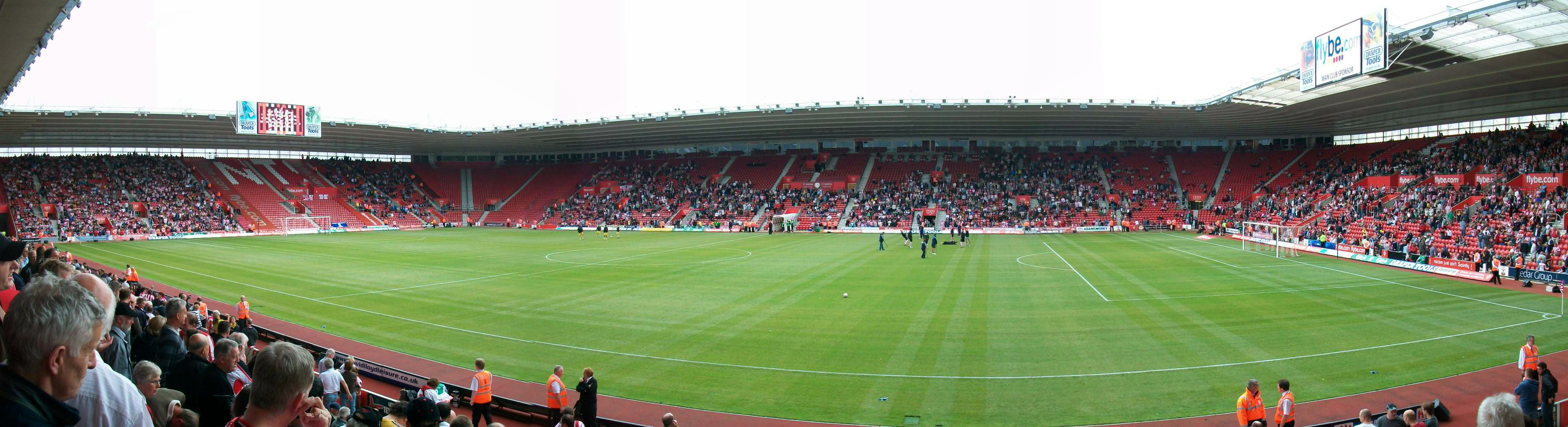
Panorama of St Mary's Stadium during Southampton v. Colchester United in 2009

== Name ==
The official ground name at opening was the Friends Provident St. Mary's Stadium. Initially the club wanted the ground to be named purely after the sponsors, but fan pressure influenced the decision to include a non-commercial title. In 2006 the new sponsor Flybe did not choose to purchase the naming rights to the stadium, meaning it reverted to St Mary's Stadium.

== Capacity ==
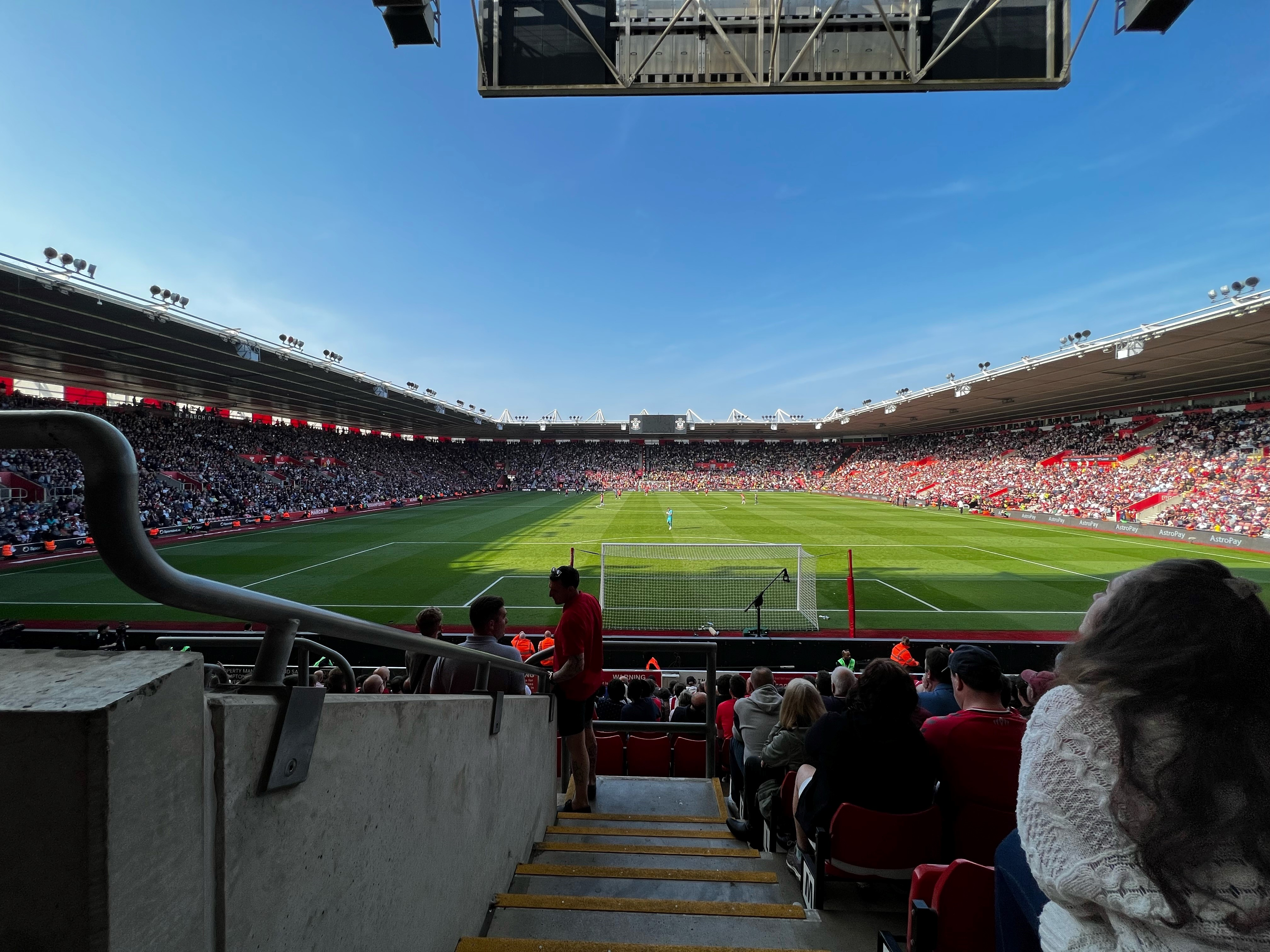
The view from the Chapel Stand at St Mary's Stadium in Southampton, April 2022

The ground has an all-seated capacity of 32,505, including the press and directors' boxes. Because of the segregation between home and away fans in the Kingsland and Chapel Stands, it is unlikely the full capacity will ever be reached for a competitive match.

The current record attendance was for the Football League Championship match between Southampton and Coventry City on 28 April 2012, when 32,363 spectators attended. The lowest league record was Southampton versus Sheffield United, when just 13,257 attended.

When the club was playing in the lower leagues this had a negative impact on attendances, although the Boxing Day fixture against Exeter City attracted an attendance of 30,890. During the 2009–10 League One campaign, attendances increased significantly, attracting 29,901 against Milton Keynes Dons in the Football League Trophy and then, just 4 days later, 31,385 in a South Coast derby against Portsmouth in the FA Cup. The overall average attendance for the league season was 20,982, a near 3,000 improvement on the previous season despite being a league lower. During the 2010–11 League One campaign the lowest attendance was 18,623 against Yeovil, while the highest was 31,653 against Walsall.

All stands, apart from the Itchen stand, can be built upon and expanded. Overall this would give an approximate capacity of around 50,000, and would cost a similar amount to how much it cost to build the stadium in the first place, which was approximately £32,000,000.

== The Ted Bates statue ==
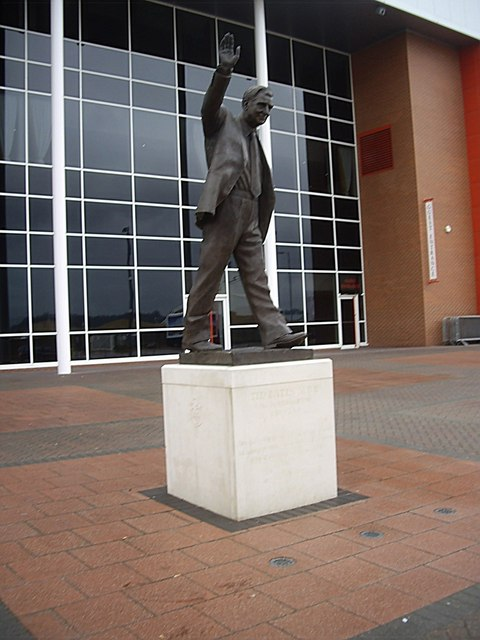
The Ted Bates (1918–2003) statue

On 17 March 2007, the £102,000 statue to commemorate club stalwart Ted Bates was unveiled, outside the front of the Itchen Stand. Almost immediately, the statue was widely condemned by supporters due to it being out of proportion, and not an accurate likeness of the former club president. The 11-foot (3.4 m) statue was made by sculptor Ian Brennan.

Former chairman, Leon Crouch stated that he would help fund a replacement or remedial work, in association with the Ted Bates Trust, who were overseeing the collection of funds, commission and erection of the statue. The statue was removed less than a week after its unveiling. The replacement statue, by sculptor Sean Hedges-Quinn, was unveiled on 22 March 2008.

== Southampton Women ==
Since the 2022–23 season, Southampton Women have played all of their home games at the St Mary's Stadium.

== Notable matches ==
The St Mary's Stadium has hosted two full England international matches, a 2–2 draw between England and Macedonia in October 2002, while Wembley Stadium was out of action due to redevelopment and the Football Association decided that England games would be played at various venues around the country. David Beckham and Steven Gerrard scored for England. The second was a 5–3 win against Kosovo in a Euro 2020 Qualifier on 10 September 2019. Raheem Sterling, Harry Kane and Jadon Sancho scored for England. There has also been an international between Japan and Nigeria.

The stadium first hosted European football in September 2003, when the Saints faced Romanian side Steaua Bucharest in the first round of the UEFA Cup. The game ended in a 1–1 draw.

In 2016, Southampton had their first venture in the UEFA Europa League and their first game against Czech side Sparta Prague ended in a 3–0 win. Later in the group stage, they faced former champions Inter Milan and won 2–1.

The venue hosted two England under-21 internationals. The first was a 2009 UEFA European Under-21 Championship qualification Group 3 match against the Republic of Ireland's under-21s on 20 November 2008. The hosts thrashed the visitors 3–0 thanks to Stephen O'Halloran's 60th minute own goal followed by James Milner's 68th-minute goal and Theo Walcott's 78th-minute goal with 31,473 in attendance. The other was an international friendly against Norway's under-21s on 28 March 2011. The hosts beat the visitors 2–0 with goals from Daniel Sturridge on the ninth minute and Danny Rose on the 40th minute with 18,000 in attendance.

In 2022 the venue hosted three matches of the UEFA Women's Euro 2022. Thursday 7 July: Norway vs Northern Ireland Monday 11 July: Austria vs Northern Ireland Friday 15 July: Northern Ireland vs England

Between Monday 1 June and Friday 5 June 2015, St Mary's Stadium hosted a world record breaking match for the longest continuous football game ever played. Players from Southampton-based charity Testlands Support Project played for 102 hours straight, beating the previous record of 101 hours.

== International games hosted ==
Matches played by England

16 October 2002 UEFA Euro 2004; Qualifying Group 7	England	2–2	North Macedonia
20:00 BST (UTC+01); Match 798	Beckham 13'; Gerrard 35' Smith (red card) 90+3'	UEFA Report	Šakiri 10'; Trajanov 24'	Attendance: 32,095; Referee: Arturo Dauden Ibañez (Spain)

11 May 2006 2007 World Cup qualifying	England	2–0	Hungary
19:05	Exley 40'; A. Scott 90+1'	Report		Attendance: 8,817; Referee: Lena Arwedahl (Sweden)

5 February 2008 2009 UEFA European Under-21 Championship qualification Group 3	England	3–0	Republic of Ireland
20:45 CEST	O'Halloran 59' (o.g.); Milner 68'; Walcott 78'	Report		Attendance: 31,473; Referee: Jouni Hyytiä (Finland)

28 March 2011 International friendly	England	2–0	Norway
Match 288	Sturridge 9'; Rose 40'	Report		Attendance: 18,000; Referee: Clément Turpin (France)

10 November 2016 International friendly	England	3–2	Italy
Match 345	Gray 6'; Baker 60'; Stephens 90+3'	Report	Galloway 13' (o.g.); Di Francesco 28'	Attendance: 11,550; Referee: Sandro Schärer (Switzerland)

6 April 2018 WCQ-G1	England	0–0	Wales
		Report		Attendance: 25,603; Referee: Pernilla Larsson (Sweden)

10 September 2019 UEFA Euro 2020 qualifying Group A	England	5–3	Kosovo
19:45 BST	Sterling 8'; Kane 19'; Vojvoda 38' (o.g.); Sancho 44', 45+1'	Report	Berisha 1', 49'; Muriqi 55' (pen.)	Attendance: 31,155; Referee: Felix Zwayer (Germany)

17 September 2021 2023 Women's World Cup qualifying	England	8–0	North Macedonia
20:00 (19:00 BST)	Toone 13'; White 42', 67' (pen.); Zivikj 45' (o.g.); England 77', 90'; Kolarovska 79' (o.g.); Mead 90+1'	Report		Attendance: 8,214; Referee: María Martínez (Spain)

15 July 2022 UEFA Women's Euro GS	Northern Ireland	0–5	England
20:00			Kirby 41'; Mead 45'; Russo 48', 53'; Burrows 76' (o.g.)	Attendance: 30,785; Referee: Esther Staubli (Switzerland)

2 December 2025 Friendly	England	2–0	Ghana
19:00 GMT	Kendall 6'; Russo 90+5' (pen.)	Report		Attendance: 20,252; Referee: Lina Lehtovaara (Finland)

Matches played by other sides*

7 October 2001 International friendly	Japan	2–2	Nigeria
15:00 BST (UTC+01)	Yanagisawa 26'; Suzuki 57'	Report	Matsuda 27' (o.g.); Aghahowa 81' Ejiofor (red card) 87'	Attendance: 11,801; Referee: Steve Dunn (England)

7 July 2022 UEFA Women's Euro GS	Norway	4–1	Northern Ireland
20:00	Blakstad 10'; Maanum 13'; Graham Hansen 31' (pen.); Reiten 54'	Report	Nelson 49'	Attendance: 9,146; Referee: Lina Lehtovaara (Finland)

11 July 2022 UEFA Women's Euro GS	Austria	2–0	Northern Ireland
17:00	Schiechtl 19'; Naschenweng 88'	Report		Attendance: 9,268; Referee: Emikar Calderas Barrera (Venezuela)

== Non-footballing use ==
As is common for modern day stadia, St Mary's is also used as a conference facility, with hospitality suites available for this purpose most days of the week.

In the Northam Stand the Saints Study Support Centre – a club-run initiative to help school children outside class – can be found, along with the offices of Southampton City Training, a quasi-council run organisation which helps young people get vocational training.

It is also used as a prom setting for many local schools of Southampton, including St. Anne's, St. George's, Thornden School, Wyvern School and Wildern Secondary School.

The stadium has also held film premieres for films such as the 2006 Casino Royale.

St Mary's was one of the 17 venues short-listed for use in the 2015 Rugby World Cup but was not selected for the final list.

=== Concerts ===
In 2005, Elton John held the first concert at the stadium with more than 25,000 fans in attendance.

Date	Performer(s)	Opening act(s)	Tour/Event	Attendance	Notes
28 May 2005	Elton John	Lulu	Peachtree Road Tour	25,925	
9 June 2006	Bon Jovi		Have a Nice Day Tour	34,783	
11 June 2008	Bon Jovi		Lost Highway Tour	30,284	
6 June 2017	Robbie Williams	Erasure	The Heavy Entertainment Show Tour		
29 May 2018	The Rolling Stones	The Vaccines	No Filter Tour	26,582	
25 May 2019	Take That	Rick Astley	Greatest Hits Live	55,180	
26 May 2019	Take That	Rick Astley	Greatest Hits Live	55,180	
31 May 2019	Rod Stewart		Live In Concert		
30 May 2022	The Killers	Blossoms	Imploding the Mirage Tour	31,149	
1 June 2024	Take That	Olly Murs	This Life on Tour	60,806	
2 June 2024	Take That	Olly Murs	This Life on Tour	61,320	
29 May 2026	Take That	Belinda Carlise, The Script	The Circus Live – Summer 2026	63,278	
30 May 2026	Take That	Belinda Carlise, The Script	The Circus Live – Summer 2026	63,278	

== The site before the stadium ==
The area the stadium is built on was for the most part previously part of Southampton gas works although there was also a certain amount of housing and guano tanks. As part of the construction of the stadium a partial archaeological excavation of the site. The area under the pitch was left undisturbed. This indicated that there had been some level of use of the site from the Mesolithic onwards. The site became part of the settlement of hamwic from around 800AD onwards. A cemetery consisting of both complete bodies and cremated remains was discovered on the site of what would become the west stand. The Northam branch of the Salisbury and Southampton Canal crossed the most north-west part of the site and now lies beneath the railway footbridge.

== Folklore and local legends ==
According to local legend, during construction of the stadium, a group of Portsmouth F.C. supporters buried their team's shirt under the Northam Stand end of the pitch and cast a curse that caused the team's initial losing streak at the new stadium. Pagan witch Ceridwen Dragonoak Connelly performed a Celtic ceremony to lift the curse just prior to the team's first win.

== Facts and figures ==
Average attendance:

2023–24: 29,429 (Championship)
2022–23: 30,416 (Premier League)
2021–22: 29,884 (Premier League)
2020–21: NA* (Premier League)
2019–20: 29,651* (Premier League)
2018–19: 30,139 (Premier League)
2017–18: 30,794 (Premier League)
2016–17: 30,936 (Premier League)
2015–16: 30,750 (Premier League)
2014–15: 30,652 (Premier League)
2013–14: 30,212 (Premier League)
2012–13: 30,874 (Premier League)
2011–12: 26,419 (Championship)
2010–11: 22,160 (League One)
2009–10: 20,982 (League One)
2008–09: 17,849 (Championship)
2007–08: 22,253 (Championship)
2006–07: 23,556 (Championship)
2005–06: 23,614 (Championship)
2004–05: 30,610 (Premier League)
2003–04: 31,699 (Premier League)
2002–03: 30,680 (Premier League)
2001–02: 30,633 (Premier League)

- Seasons interrupted by the COVID-19 pandemic

Record attendance:
32,363 v Coventry City, Championship 28 April 2012

Biggest Saints wins at St Mary's
8–0 v Sunderland, Premier League 18 October 2014
6–1 v Tranmere Rovers, League Cup 2 October 2002
6–1 v Aston Villa, Premier League 16 May 2015
5–0 v Huddersfield Town, League One 2 March 2010
5–0 v Swansea City, Championship 26 December 2023
5–0 v Queens Park Rangers, Championship 24 February 2026
5–1 v Walsall, League One 27 February 2010
4–0 v Tottenham Hotspur, FA Cup 4 January 2003
4–0 v Hull City, Championship 8 February 2007
4–0 v Dagenham & Redbridge, League One 2 November 2010
4–0 v Exeter City, League One 1 January 2011
4–0 v Watford, Championship 1 October 2011
4–0 v Derby County, Championship 18 February 2012
4–0 v Coventry City, Championship 28 April 2012
4–0 v Newcastle United, Premier League 29 March 2014
4–0 v Newcastle United, Premier League 13 September 2014
4–0 v Arsenal, Premier League 26 December 2015
4–0 v Blackburn Rovers, Championship 16 December 2023
4–0 v Walsall, FA Cup 6 January 2024
4–0 v Sheffield Wednesday, Championship 13 January 2024

Biggest Saints defeats at St Mary's
0–9 v Leicester City, Premier League 25 October 2019
0–6 v Chelsea, Premier League 9 April 2022
1–6 v Liverpool, League Cup 2 December 2015
0–5 v Arsenal, FA Cup 28 January 2017
0–5 v Tottenham Hotspur, Premier League 15 December 2024
0–5 v Brentford, Premier League 4 January 2025
1–5 v Chelsea, FA Cup 5 January 2013
1–5 v Chelsea, Premier League 4 December 2024
0–4 v Manchester United, FA Cup 12 March 2005
0–4 v Brighton & Hove Albion, Premier League 22 February 2025

Highest scoring games at St Mary's
Southampton 0–9 Leicester, Premier League 25 October 2019
Southampton 8–0 Sunderland, Premier League 18 October 2014
England 5–3 Kosovo, UEFA Euro 2020 qualifying, 11 September 2019
Southampton 4–4 Liverpool, Premier League 28 May 2023
Southampton 4–4 Norwich City, Championship 12 August 2023
Southampton 5–3 Huddersfield Town, Championship 10 February 2024
Southampton 6–1 Tranmere Rovers, League Cup 2 October 2002
Southampton 4–3 Norwich City, Premier League 30 April 2005
Southampton 3–4 Leeds United, Championship 19 November 2005
Southampton 4–3 Milton Keynes Dons, FA Cup 7 January 2006
Southampton 5–2 Yeovil Town, League Cup 23 August 2006
Southampton 4–3 Birmingham City, Championship 29 November 2006
Southampton 5–2 Barnsley, Championship 17 February 2007
Southampton 4–3 Burnley, FA Cup 4 January 2014
Southampton 6–1 Aston Villa, Premier League 16 May 2015
Southampton 1–6 Liverpool, League Cup 2 December 2015
Southampton 2–5 Tottenham Hotspur, Premier League 20 September 2020

=== Top scorers (as of the end of the 2025–26 season) ===
Rank	Player	Goals
1	(England) Rickie Lambert	62
2	(England) Adam Lallana	37
3	(England) James Beattie	32
4	(Scotland) Ché Adams	27
5	(England) Adam Armstrong	26
6	(Republic of Ireland) Shane Long	23
7	(England) James Ward-Prowse	22
8	(England) Danny Ings	21
8	(Italy) Graziano Pellè	21
10	(Brazil) Guly do Prado	17
10	(England) Jay Rodriguez	17
12	(England) Charlie Austin	16
12	(Senegal) Sadio Mané	16
14	(Scotland) Stuart Armstrong	15
15	(England) Kevin Phillips	14
16	(Serbia) Dušan Tadić	13
16	(Trinidad and Tobago) Kenwyne Jones	13
16	(England) Lee Barnard	13
16	(Trinidad and Tobago) Stern John	13
20	(Portugal) José Fonte	12
20	(Latvia) Marian Pahars	12
20	(England) Nathan Redmond	12
23	(England) Andrew Surman	11
23	(Poland) Marek Saganowski	11
23	(England) Peter Crouch	11
26	(England) Bradley Wright-Phillips	10
26	(England) Brett Ormerod	10

== See also ==
- List of stadiums in the United Kingdom by capacity
- Lists of stadiums
