= 2006–07 Southampton F.C. season =

Southampton F.C.
2006–07 season
- Chairman: Michael Wilde
- Manager: George Burley
- Stadium: St Mary's
- Championship: 6th (qualified for playoffs)
- Play-offs: Semi-finals
- FA Cup: Fourth round proper
- League Cup: Third round
- Top goalscorer: League: Grzegorz Rasiak (18); All: Grzegorz Rasiak (20)
- Highest home attendance: 32,008 (vs. Southend United, 6 May)
- Lowest home attendance: 18,736 (vs. Colchester United, 16 March)
- Average home league attendance: 23,556
Home colours	Away colours	Third colours

During the 2006–07 English football season, Southampton Football Club competed in the Football League Championship.

Southampton improved in their second consecutive season in the Championship, although their overall form was inconsistent and they were soon out of the race for automatic promotion. Their inconsistency threatened to put them out of the play-off picture too, but eventually Southampton scraped to sixth position in the final table. Southampton were drawn against manager George Burley's old club Derby County, who managed to defeat Southampton 4–3 in a penalty shootout after a 4–4 aggregate draw over two legs.

== Final League table (extract) ==
Pos	Team	Pld	W	D	L	GF	GA	GD	Pts	Promotion, qualification or relegation
4	West Bromwich Albion	46	22	10	14	81	55	+26	76	Qualification for Championship play-offs
5	Wolverhampton Wanderers	46	22	10	14	59	56	+3	76	Qualification for Championship play-offs
6	Southampton	46	21	12	13	77	53	+24	75	Qualification for Championship play-offs
7	Preston North End	46	22	8	16	64	53	+11	74	
8	Stoke City	46	19	16	11	62	41	+21	73	

Source: RSSSF
Rules for classification: In the Football League goals scored (F) takes precedence over goal difference (GD).

== Championship ==
Note: Southampton score given first

Date	Opponent	Venue	Result	Attendance	Scorers
6 August 2006	Derby County	A	2–2	21,939	Bale, Wright-Phillips
9 August 2006	Coventry City	H	2–0	21,088	Bale, Rasiak
12 August 2006	West Bromwich Albion	H	0–0	24,322	
19 August 2006	Barnsley	A	2–2	11,306	Rasiak (2)
26 August 2006	Preston North End	H	1–1	20,712	Rasiak
9 September 2006	Ipswich Town	A	1–2	21,422	Jones
12 September 2006	Crystal Palace	A	2–0	17,084	Jones, Rasiak
16 September 2006	Plymouth Argyle	H	1–0	22,514	Rasiak
23 September 2006	Burnley	A	3–2	13,051	Rasiak (2), Skacel
30 September 2006	Queens Park Rangers	H	1–2	25,185	Wright-Phillips
14 October 2006	Leicester City	A	2–3	21,347	Viafara, Idiakez
17 October 2006	Cardiff City	A	0–1	19,345	
21 October 2006	Stoke City	H	1–0	20,531	Licka
28 October 2006	Colchester United	A	0–2	5,893	
1 November 2006	Wolverhampton Wanderers	H	2–0	18,979	Wright-Phillips, Jones
4 November 2006	Hull City	H	0–0	20,560	
11 November 2006	Sunderland	A	1–1	25,667	Bale
18 November 2006	Leeds United	A	3–0	19,647	Rasiak (2), Skacel
25 November 2006	Luton Town	H	2–1	20,482	Baird, Rasiak
29 November 2006	Birmingham City	H	4–3	21,889	Jones (2), Skacel, Wright-Phillips
2 December 2006	Hull City	A	4–2	15,697	Rasiak (2), Bale, Wright-Phillips
9 December 2006	Southend United	A	1–2	10,867	Rasiak
16 December 2006	Norwich City	H	2–1	25,919	Jones, Bale
23 December 2006	Sheffield Wednesday	A	3–3	23,739	Rasiak, Jones, Wright-Phillips
26 December 2006	Crystal Palace	H	1–1	30,548	Baird
30 December 2006	Leicester City	H	2–0	24,447	Pele, Prutton
1 January 2007	Plymouth Argyle	A	1–1	15,377	Rasiak
13 January 2007	Burnley	H	0–0	20,486	
20 January 2007	Queens Park Rangers	A	2–0	14,686	Rasiak, Wright-Phillips
31 January 2007	Sheffield Wednesday	H	2–1	20,230	Jones (2)
2 February 2007	Derby County	H	0–1	27,656	
10 February 2007	West Bromwich Albion	A	1–1	21,138	Jones
17 February 2007	Barnsley	H	5–2	22,460	Surman (3), Jones (2)
20 February 2007	Coventry City	A	1–2	17,194	Saganowski
24 February 2007	Ipswich Town	H	1–0	27,974	Saganowski
5 March 2007	Preston North End	A	1–3	13,060	Rasiak
10 March 2007	Stoke City	A	1–2	13,404	Saganowski
13 March 2007	Cardiff City	H	2–2	20,383	Baird, Wright-Phillips
16 March 2007	Colchester United	H	1–2	18,736	Saganowski
31 March 2007	Wolverhampton Wanderers	A	6–0	24,804	Saganowski (3), Breen o.g., Best, Surman
7 April 2007	Luton Town	A	2–0	9,171	Viafara, Saganowski
9 April 2007	Sunderland	H	1–2	25,766	Saganowski
14 April 2007	Birmingham City	A	1–2	19,754	Saganowski
21 April 2007	Leeds United	H	1–0	29,012	Wright-Phillips
28 April 2007	Norwich City	A	1–0	25,437	Best
6 May 2007	Southend United	H	4–1	32,008	Jones (2), Best (2)

=== Legend ===
Win	Draw	Loss

== Championship play-off semi-final ==
Date	Opponent	Venue	Result	Attendance	Scorers
12 May 2007	Derby County	H	1–2	30,602	Surman
15 May 2007	Derby County	A	3–2^{a}	31,569	Viafara (2), Rasiak

== FA Cup ==
Round	Date	Opponent	Venue	Result	Attendance	Goalscorers
R3	6 January 2007	Torquay United	A	2–0	5,396	Rasiak (2)
R4	28 January 2007	Manchester City	A	1–3	26,496	Jones

== League Cup ==
Round	Date	Opponent	Venue	Result	Attendance	Goalscorers
R1	23 August 2006	Yeovil Town	H	5–2	20,653	Cohen o.g., Skacel, Wright-Phillips, Dyer, Jones
R2	19 September 2006	Millwall	A	4–0	5,492	Belmadi (2), Wright-Phillips, McGoldrick
R3	24 October 2006	Notts County	A	0–2	6,731	

== Kit ==
The season's kit was manufactured by the club's own brand, Saints; a new kit was introduced for the season. The kit was sponsored by English airline Flybe.

== Squad statistics ==
Numbers in parentheses denote appearances as substitute.
Players with squad numbers struck through and marked † left the club during the playing season.
Players with names in italics and marked * were on loan from another club for the whole of their season with Southampton.
Players listed with no appearances have been in the matchday squad but only as unused substitutes.
Key to positions: GK – Goalkeeper; DF – Defender; MF – Midfielder; FW – Forward

No.	Pos.	Nat.	Name	Apps	Goals	Apps	Goals	Apps	Goals	Apps	Goals	Apps	Goals	Yellow card	Red card
No.	Pos.	Nat.	Name	League		FA Cup		League Cup		Play-offs		Total		Discipline	
1	GK	ENG	Kelvin Davis	38	0	2	0	3	0	1	0	44	0	1	0
2	DF	SWE	Alexander Östlund	17 (3)	0	1	0	1	0	1	0	20 (3)	0	4	0
3	DF	CPV	Pelé	34 (3)	1	2	0	3	0	2	0	41 (3)	1	6	0
~~4~~ †	MF	ARG	Marcelo Sarmiento *	0	0	1	0	2 (1)	0	0	0	3 (1)	0	1	0
4	FW	POL	Marek Saganowski *	11 (2)	10	0	0	0	0	2	0	13 (2)	10	1	0
5	DF	NOR	Claus Lundekvam	33	0	0	0	0	0	0	0	33	0	6	0
6	DF	ENG	Darren Powell	8	0	2	0	0	0	0	0	10	0	3	0
7	MF	CZE	Rudi Skácel	32 (5)	3	0	0	2	0	1 (1)	0	35 (6)	4	3	0
8	FW	ENG	Bradley Wright-Phillips	15 (24)	8	1 (1)	0	3	3	0	0	19 (25)	11	2	0
9	FW	POL	Grzegorz Rasiak	32 (7)	18	2	2	1	0	0 (2)	1	35 (9)	21	1	0
10	MF	ENG	Jermaine Wright	41 (1)	1	2	0	1 (1)	0	0	0	44 (2)	1	0	0
12	MF	CZE	Mario Lička	7 (8)	1	0 (2)	0	1 (1)	0	0	0	8 (11)	1	3	0
~~14~~ †	FW	JAM	Ricardo Fuller	1	0	0	0	0 (1)	0	0	0	1 (1)	0	0	0
14	MF	ESP	Iñigo Idiakez	12 (2)	1	0	0	0	0	0 (1)	0	12 (3)	1	5	0
15	FW	TRI	Kenwyne Jones	25 (9)	14	1	1	2	1	1	0	29 (9)	16	2	1
16	DF	ENG	Martin Cranie	0 (1)	0	0 (1)	0	0	0	1	0	1 (2)	0	0	0
17	MF	ALG	Djamel Belmadi	9 (5)	0	0	0	1	1	1 (1)	0	11 (6)	1	2	0
18	MF	ENG	Nathan Dyer	10 (8)	0	0	0	0 (3)	1	0	0	10 (11)	1	1	0
19	DF	ENG	Chris Makin	19 (3)	0	1	0	2	0	1	0	23 (3)	0	1	0
20	MF	ENG	David Prutton	1 (2)	1	0 (1)	0	0	0	0	0	1 (3)	1	0	0
21	DF	NIR	Chris Baird	44	3	2	0	3	0	2	0	51	3	5	0
22	DF	WAL	Gareth Bale	38	5	1	0	3	0	1	0	43	5	4	0
23	MF	COL	Jhon Viáfara	29 (7)	2	2	0	2	0	2	2	35 (7)	4	8	0
24	MF	ENG	Danny Guthrie *	8 (2)	0	0	0	0	0	2	0	10 (2)	0	0	0
25	GK	ENG	Michael Poke	0	0	0	0	0	0	0	0	0	0	0	0
26	GK	ENG	Kevin Miller	0	0	0	0	0	0	0	0	0	0	0	0
27	FW	IRL	Leon Best	6 (3)	4	0	0	0	0	1 (1)	0	7 (4)	4	1	0
28	GK	POL	Bartosz Białkowski	8	0	0	0	0	0	1	0	9	0	0	0
29	MF	ENG	Andrew Surman	26 (11)	4	0	0	2 (1)	0	2	1	30 (12)	5	3	0
35	FW	ENG	David McGoldrick	1 (8)	0	2	0	0 (1)	1	0	0	3 (9)	1	0	0
41	MF	ENG	Adam Lallana	1	0	0	0	1	0	0	0	2	0	0	0

Players not included in matchday squads
No.	Pos.	Nat.	Name
11	DF	SWE	Michael Svensson
~~24~~ †	FW	ENG	Dexter Blackstock
34	MF	WAL	Lloyd James
36	MF	ENG	Simon Gillett
~~37~~ †	MF	FIN	Tim Sparv
~~45~~ †	DF	ENG	Kyle Critchell

== Transfers ==
=== In ===
Date	Nationality	Position	Name	Club From	Fee
2 May 2006	(Poland)	FW	Grzegorz Rasiak	Tottenham Hotspur	£2,000,000
5 July 2006	(England)	FW	Bradley Wright-Phillips	Manchester City	Undisclosed
10 July 2006	(England)	MF	Jermaine Wright	Leeds United	Free
19 July 2006	(Cape Verde)	DF	Pelé	Belenenses	Undisclosed
29 July 2006	(Czech Republic)	MF	Rudi Skácel	Hearts	£1,600,000
4 August 2006	(Colombia)	MF	Jhon Viáfara	Portsmouth	£750,000
4 August 2006	(Czech Republic)	MF	Mario Lička	1. FC Slovácko	Free
16 August 2006	(England)	DF	Chris Makin	Reading	Free
31 August 2006	(Spain)	MF	Iñigo Idiakez	Derby County	£250,000

=== Out ===
Date	Nationality	Position	Name	Club To	Fee
6 June 2006	(Belgium)	DF	Jelle Van Damme	Anderlecht	Undisclosed
1 July 2006	(Latvia)	FW	Marian Pahars	Free Agency	Released
1 July 2006	(England)	DF	Darren Kenton	Leicester City	Free
1 July 2006	(Canada)	DF	Jim Brennan	Free Agency	Released
12 July 2006	(France)	MF	Yoann Folly	Sheffield Wednesday	Undisclosed
2 August 2006	(England)	DF	Danny Higginbotham	Stoke City	£225,000
9 August 2006	(England)	FW	Dexter Blackstock	Queens Park Rangers	Undisclosed
31 August 2006	(Jamaica)	FW	Ricardo Fuller	Stoke City	£500,000

=== Loans In ===
Date	Nationality	Position	Name	Club From	Length
28 June 2006	(Argentina)	MF	Marcelo Sarmiento	Racing Club de Cordoba	Full Season (ended 19 January)
30 January 2007	(Poland)	FW	Marek Saganowski	Troyes	Until end of season

=== Loans Out ===
Date	Nationality	Position	Name	Club To	Length
8 November 2006	(England)	DF	Martin Cranie	Yeovil Town	Until 1 January
30 January 2007	(England)	MF	Simon Gillett	Blackpool	Until end of season
30 January 2007	(England)	MF	David Prutton	Nottingham Forest	Until end of season
2 March 2007	(England)	DF	Martin Cranie	Yeovil Town	One Month (recalled 30 March)
9 March 2007	(Spain)	MF	Iñigo Idiakez	Queens Park Rangers	One Month (extended on 5 April, recalled 16 April)
