= Grzegorz Rasiak =

Polish footballer (born 1979)

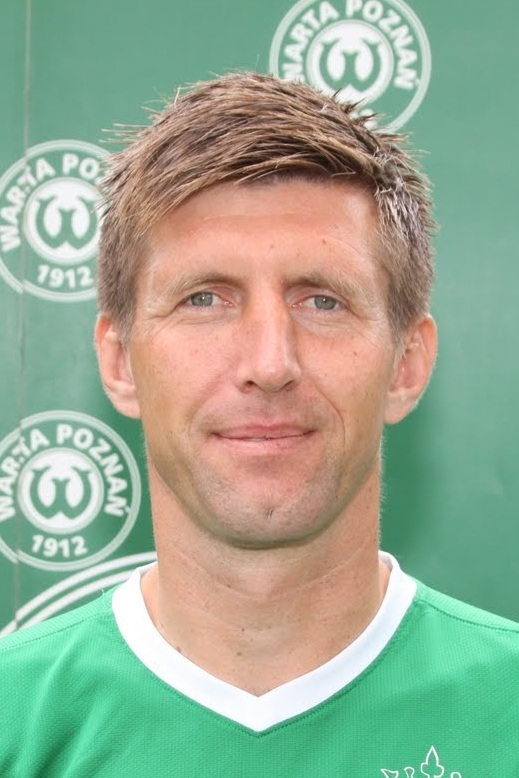
- Rasiak with Warta Poznań in 2013

Personal information
- Full name: Grzegorz Rasiak
- Date of birth: 12 January 1979 (age 47)
- Place of birth: Szczecin, Poland
- Height: 6 ft 3 in (1.91 m)
- Position: Striker

Youth career
- Olimpia Poznań
- SKS 13 Poznań
- MSP Szamotuły

Senior career*
Years	Team	Apps	(Gls)
1996–1998	Warta Poznań	20	(3)
1998–2000	GKS Bełchatów	7	(2)
2000–2001	Odra Wodzisław	28	(9)
2001–2004	Dyskobolia Grodzisk	66	(34)
2004–2005	Derby County	41	(18)
2005–2006	Tottenham Hotspur	8	(0)
2006	→ Southampton (loan)	13	(4)
2006–2009	Southampton	65	(24)
2008	→ Bolton Wanderers (loan)	7	(0)
2008–2009	→ Watford (loan)	21	(8)
2009–2010	Reading	30	(9)
2010–2011	AEL Limassol	17	(0)
2011–2012	Jagiellonia Białystok	12	(2)
2012–2013	Lechia Gdańsk	13	(4)
2012–2013	Lechia Gdańsk II	5	(3)
2013–2014	Warta Poznań	25	(12)
Total		378	(132)

International career
2002–2007	Poland	37	(8)
- * Club domestic league appearances and goals

Grzegorz Rasiak (Polish pronunciation: [ˈɡʐɛɡɔʐ ˈraɕak]; born 12 January 1979) is a Polish former professional footballer who played as a striker.

After starting his career in his native Poland, Rasiak moved to England with Derby County in 2004. He subsequently had a spell with Tottenham Hotspur before joining Southampton, as well as periods on loan to Bolton Wanderers and Watford, before joining Reading in August 2009. He left Reading for the Cypriot club AEL Limassol in 2010, spending a season there before returning to Poland where he remained until his retirement in 2014.

From 2002 to 2007, he played for the Poland national team, earning 37 caps, scoring 8 goals and playing at the 2006 FIFA World Cup.

== Club career ==
=== Poland ===
Rasiak was born in Szczecin. In the 1996–97 season Rasiak joined second division side Warta Poznań where he spent two seasons. In 1998, he moved to First Division side GKS Bełchatów, before moving to Odra Wodzisław for the 2000–01 season. The next season, he moved to the club where he first achieved a level of success, Dyskobolia Grodzisk Wielkopolski. In three seasons at Dyskobolia he played in 66 league matches, scoring 34 goals, forming a partnership in 2003–04 with Andrzej Niedzielan. His time at Dyskobolia Grodzisk Wielkopolski was when Rasiak made a breakthrough. For three seasons playing in Grodzisk played 66 matches, scoring a total of 34 goals.

In 2004, he was recruited by Italian club AC Siena. It then emerged that he was unable to play for the club, as they had exceeded their limit of foreign players.

=== Derby County ===
Rasiak joined Championship side Derby County on 24 September 2004 for a free transfer. In his first season with the club he scored 16 goals in 35 matches, as Derby finished in fourth place, but failed to get through the play-offs.

After failing to gain promotion, the club were under financial pressure and were forced by their bankers to raise cash, which led to Rasiak being sold to Premier League side Tottenham Hotspur for a fee said to be up to £3 million.

=== Tottenham Hotspur ===
Rasiak signed on 31 August 2005, the final day of the transfer window. On his arrival, manager Martin Jol described Rasiak as "a tall target man, a hard-working, honest player with a good goal scoring record." Rasiak's time at White Hart Lane was marred by a lack of first team opportunities.

=== Southampton ===
In February 2006, Rasiak was loaned from Spurs to Championship side Southampton, where his former Derby manager George Burley was now in charge. The deal was structured initially as a three-month loan, before becoming permanent in early May 2006, with Rasiak joining Southampton for a fee of £2 million.

In the 2006–07 season he had a strong start, scoring 17 league goals by mid-January, with a further two goals in the FA Cup. This included four braces in the league and one in the FA Cup, all in away matches. After mid-January he lost his place in the starting eleven to fellow countryman Marek Saganowski, but finished the season as the club's top goalscorer with 21 goals.

=== Bolton Wanderers ===
On 31 January 2008, Rasiak secured a loan move to Bolton Wanderers until the end of the season after Gary Megson decided to bolster his attacking options after the departure of Nicolas Anelka to Chelsea. Following his loan move Rasiak admitted it was not an easy decision to join Bolton Wanderers, but that he intended to be part of the Poland squad for UEFA Euro 2008. On 9 February 2008, Rasiak made his first appearance for Bolton when he came on as a substitute for El Hadji Diouf in a defeat to Portsmouth at the Reebok Stadium. His second appearance came during the second half of Bolton's local derby against Blackburn Rovers at Ewood Park where he scored within a couple of minutes of his introduction from the substitutes bench, only for the linesman to rule the goal out for offside. Rasiak went on to make seven appearances for Bolton Wanderers and Megson decided not to take him up on a permanent basis.

=== Watford ===
On 15 August 2008, Rasiak signed on loan with fellow Championship side Watford until the end of the 2008–09 season, with the option of a permanent transfer. He made his debut on 16 August 2008 against Charlton Athletic, coming on as a substitute for Tamás Priskin on 65 minutes. He scored his first goal for the club in a 3–2 defeat at home to Wolverhampton Wanderers on 25 October 2008.

In January 2009, Rasiak scored in FA Cup matches against Scunthorpe United and Crystal Palace to help set up an unexpected fifth round tie against Chelsea.

He was ruled out for a month after picking up an injury against Nottingham Forest in March which was a blow to Watford as Raziak appeared to be forging an unbeatable partnership with Priskin. Both strikers got on the scoresheet in both of Watford's wins against Charlton Athletic and Nottingham Forest (the same match in which Rasiak got injured) that took place within three days of each other in March 2009.

In May 2009, Watford opened negotiations with Southampton to sign Rasiak permanently, but the clubs were unable to agree on a fee with Watford unable to afford to sign him.

=== Reading ===
After making four appearances for the "Saints" in August 2009, he joined Reading on 27 August for an undisclosed fee, signing a two-year contract. He scored his first goal for Reading in a 1–1 draw with his former club Watford on 26 September 2009. He scored his second and third goals in a 3–1 win over Coventry City, scoring after 31 seconds and then scoring his second of the game in the second half. However, Rasiak failed to hold down a regular first-team spot under then manager Brian McDermott.

=== AEL Limassol ===
Rasiak was given a free transfer to AEL Limassol on 20 August 2010, signing a two-year contract. After making 17 appearances without scoring, AEL Limassol terminated Rasiak's contract after a contractual dispute with the club.

=== Return to Poland ===
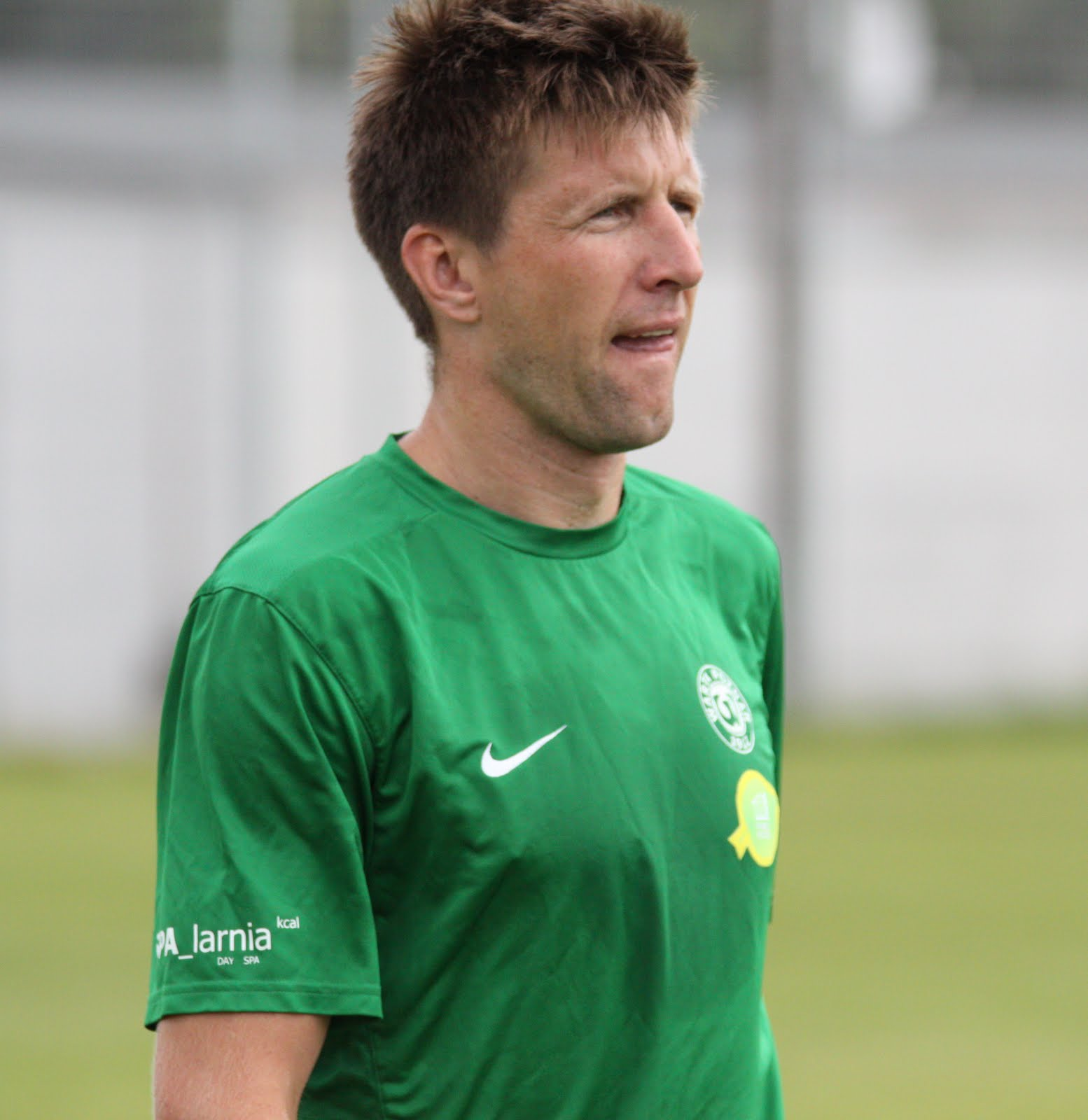
Rasiak training with Warta Poznań in August 2013

In August 2011, while training with Charlton Athletic, Rasisk scored a penalty on his first appearance, in a friendly match against Carshalton Athletic in a 2–1 defeat. However, Rasiak left Charlton following his trial when the club decided instead to sign fans favourite Jason Euell to bolster their attack and Rasiak returned to Poland. One month after leaving Charlton, Rasiak returned to Poland, joining Jagiellonia Białystok. The move was delayed by his previous club AEL Limassol failing to send documents which prompted FIFA to intervene. On 3 December 2011, Rasiak made his debut for Jagiellonia Białystok in a 2–0 defeat against Podbeskidzie Bielsko-Biała. On 11 December 2011, Rasiak played his second match where he scored his first goal for the new club in the 1–0 away win over Lechia Gdańsk. It was his first goal in the Polish league for 7 years. Rasiak stayed with Jagiellonia for one season, and then spent one season with Lechia Gdańsk. Rasiak then re-joined his old club Warta Poznań, where he became the club's top goalscorer in his final 2013–14 season, with 12 goals in 25 games.

== International career ==
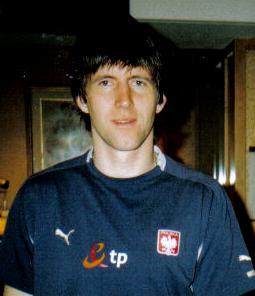
Rasiak with the Poland national team in August 2007

Rasiak made his international debut for Poland on 10 February 2002 in a friendly match with Faroe Islands under manager Jerzy Engel. He then had to wait a year before his next international appearance under Paweł Janas, before becoming a regular in the Polish team.

In August 2005 he was part of the national team's triumphant performance at the Valeri Lobanovsky Memorial Tournament 2005, being the tournament's top goal scorer with three goals.

Rasiak has made 37 appearances for his country, scoring on 8 occasions, and was part of the team that qualified for the 2006 World Cup. He was selected for the 23-man national squad that competed at the World Cup Finals in Germany. Two years later he was not selected for the 2008 European Championships.

== Career statistics ==
=== International ===
Appearances and goals by national team and year
National team	Year	Apps	Goals
Poland	2002	1	0
Poland	2003	7	3
Poland	2004	8	0
Poland	2005	9	3
Poland	2006	8	2
Poland	2007	4	0
Total		37	8

Scores and results list Poland's goal tally first, score column indicates score after each Rasiak goal.

List of international goals scored by Grzegorz Rasiak
No.	Date	Venue	Opponent	Score	Result	Competition
1	14 February 2003	Stadion Poljud, Split, Croatia	Macedonia	2–0	3–0	Friendly
2	16 November 2003	Kazimierz Górski Stadium, Płock, Poland	Serbia and Montenegro	2–0	4–3	Friendly
3	14 December 2003	Ta' Qali National Stadium, Ta' Qali, Malta	Lithuania	1–0	3–1	Friendly
4	15 August 2005	Valeriy Lobanovskyi Dynamo Stadium, Kyiv, Ukraine	Serbia and Montenegro	2–1	3–2	Valeri Lobanovsky Memorial Tournament
5	17 August 2005	Valeriy Lobanovskyi Dynamo Stadium, Kyiv, Ukraine	Israel	2–2	3–2	Valeri Lobanovsky Memorial Tournament
6	17 August 2005	Valeriy Lobanovskyi Dynamo Stadium, Kyiv, Ukraine	Israel	3–2	3–2	Valeri Lobanovsky Memorial Tournament
7	14 May 2006	Amica Stadium, Wronki, Poland	Faroe Islands	2–0	4–0	Friendly
8	14 May 2006	Amica Stadium, Wronki, Poland	Faroe Islands	4–0	4–0	Friendly
