= Simon Gillett =

English footballer (born 1985)

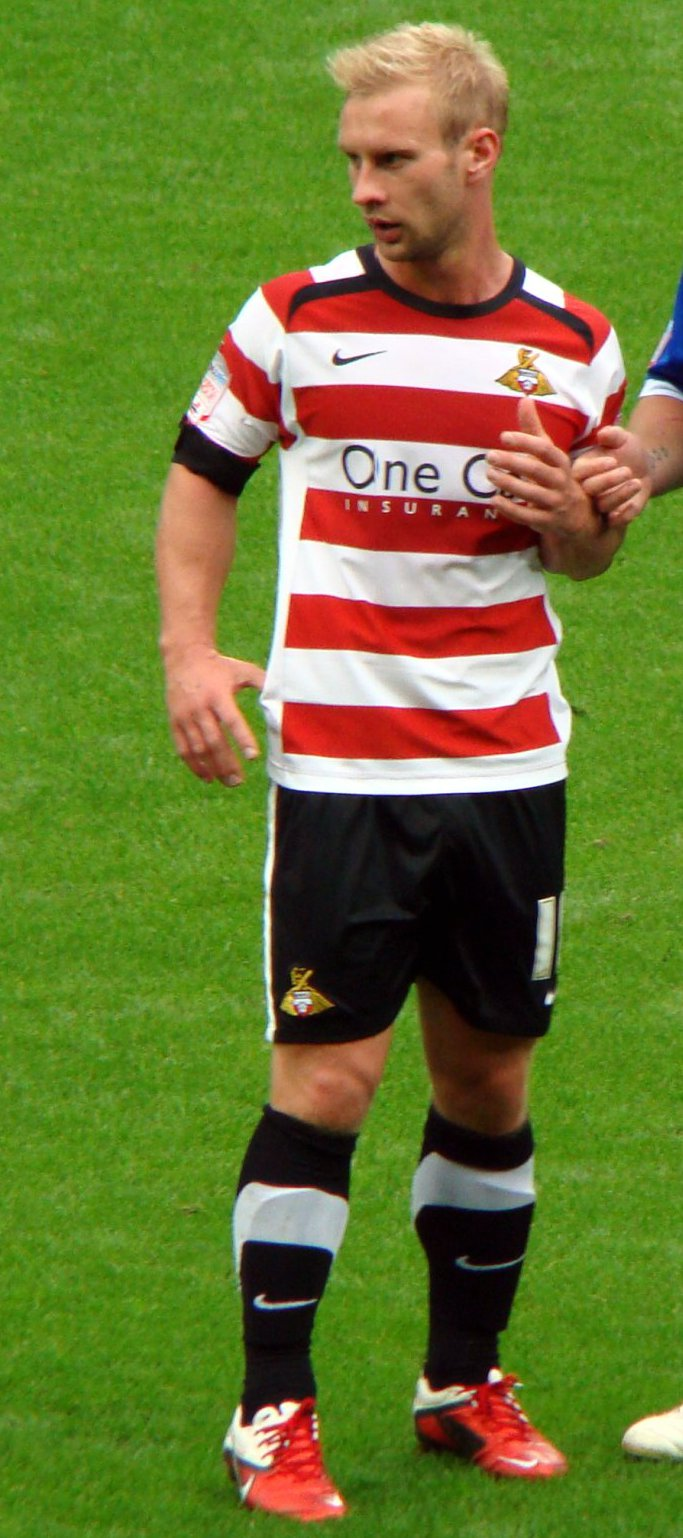
- Gillett playing for Doncaster Rovers in 2011

Personal information
- Full name: Simon James Gillett
- Date of birth: 6 November 1985 (age 40)
- Place of birth: Oxford, England
- Height: 5 ft 6 in (1.68 m)
- Position: Midfielder

Youth career
- 2000–2005: Southampton

Senior career*
Years	Team	Apps	(Gls)
2005–2010	Southampton	31	(0)
2005	→ Walsall (loan)	2	(0)
2006	→ Blackpool (loan)	14	(1)
2006–2007	→ AFC Bournemouth (loan)	7	(1)
2007	→ Blackpool (loan)	17	(0)
2007	→ Yeovil Town (loan)	4	(0)
2009	→ Doncaster Rovers (loan)	11	(0)
2010–2012	Doncaster Rovers	68	(4)
2012–2014	Nottingham Forest	25	(0)
2013–2014	→ Bristol City (loan)	23	(2)
2014–2016	Yeovil Town	23	(1)
2016	→ Peterborough United (loan)	5	(0)
Total		230	(9)
- * Club domestic league appearances and goals

Simon James Gillett (born 6 November 1985) is an English former professional footballer. A midfielder, he played for nine different clubs between 2005 and 2016, most of them loan spells.

== Club career ==
=== Southampton ===
Born in Oxford, England, Gillett started his career at Southampton Academy since 2000 and progressed through the academy and the reserve.

After recovering from an injury, he made his Southampton first-team debut against Leicester City in the fourth round of the FA Cup in 2006, coming on for an Injured David Prutton after just 30 minutes of the game played. Southampton won 1–0 with Kenwyne Jones the goal scorer. At the end of the 2005–06 season, Gillett was offered a new contract by the club, which he then signed a contract, keeping him until 2008.

After his loan spell at Yeovil Town came to an end, Gillett made his league debut for the club, where he came on as a substitute for goal scorer Stern John in the late minutes, in a 1–0 win over Leicester City on 15 March 2008. After making another appearance towards the end of the 2007–08 season, Gillett was awarded with a contract extension, keeping him until 2010.

The 2008–09 season saw Gillett's expectation to make a breakthrough in the first team under the management of Jan Poortvliet. Gillett made his first start for the club in the opening game of the season, playing 90 minutes, in a 2–1 loss against Cardiff City. He began to get first team football for numbers of games until he suffered injuries and suspension. Even after making his return from injury, Gillettt was unable to help the club survive relegation in the Football League Championship.

In the 2009–10 season, Gillett made his first appearance of the season, where he played 15 minutes, in a 1–1 draw against Millwall. However, Gillett's first team opportunities became increasingly limited under the management of Alan Pardew and never played for the club again after his Johnstone Paint Cup final appearance. Ending his 10-year stay at the club with a winners medal. On 15 May 2010 he was released from Southampton.

=== Loan spells ===
On 30 September 2005, Gillett gained his first team experience when he was loaned out to League One side Walsall on a month deal loan. The next day, Gillett made his Walsall debut, where he played for 64 minutes, in a 3–2 loss against Port Vale. After making another appearance, Gillett returned to his parent club soon after suffering an injury.

On 9 August 2006, Gillett was loaned out to Blackpool on a one-month deal. Gillett then made his Blackpool debut on 12 August 2006, in a 1–0 loss against Rotherham United. After extending his loan spell at the club for two months, It was with Blackpool that he scored his first league goal, on 12 September, in a 1–1 draw with Chesterfield at Bloomfield Road. The following month, on 21 October, he was sent off in the Seasiders' 2–1 win at Crewe Alexandra, which turns out to be his last appearance for the club. After making fourteen appearances, Gillett returned to his parent club.

Weeks after returning to his parent club, on 23 November 2006, he moved on loan to AFC Bournemouth until the New Year. Gillett made his Bournemouth debut on 25 November 2006, playing 90 minutes, in a 0–0 draw against Bradford City. Gillett then scored his first Bournemouth goal on 23 December 2006 against his former club, Blackpool and saw Bournemouth lost 3–1. After making seven appearances and scoring once in total, Gillett returned to his parent club after suffering from ankle injury and in addition to being recalled.

Having previously said he would like to return to the club, it was announced on 30 January 2007, Gillett returned to Blackpool on loan until the end of the 2006–07 season. Gillett's first game after signing for the club on loan spell came on 3 February 2007, in a 3–1 loss against Blackpool. After making seventeen appearances, Gillett remained at the club for the club's play-offs and on 27 May 2007 he came on as a last-minute substitute in the Seasiders' League One play-off final victory over Yeovil Town at Wembley.

On 20 September 2007, he joined League One side Yeovil Town on loan, initially for a month. Gillett made his Yeovil Town debut on 22 September 2007, in a 2–1 loss against Brighton & Hove Albion. Gillett went on to make four appearances for the club before returning to his parent club.

=== Doncaster Rovers ===
Gillett joined championship club Doncaster Rovers on 12 October 2009 on a two-month loan. Gillett made his Doncaster Rovers debut five days later on 17 October 2009, in a 1–0 loss against Barnsley. His good performance saw Doncaster Rovers keen on signing him on a free transfer. However, this never happened and returned to his parent club the following month, where he made a total of eleven appearances for the club.

On 5 July 2010, Gillett agreed to join Doncaster Rovers subject to a medical, with the deal being completed on the evening of 7 July. Gillett signed a 2-year contract with Doncaster, and was assigned the shirt number 18. His second Doncaster debut came in a 2–0 win away to Preston North End; Gillett however, was sent off late on in the match, for two bookable offences. On 18 September 2010, he scored his first goal for Doncaster Rovers in a 2–2 draw with Watford. However, Gillett missed most of the season, with just twenty–two appearances, due to injury.

The 2011–12 season saw Gillett regained his first team place at the start of the season and scored his first Doncaster Rovers goal on 27 September 2011 against Hull City. Gillett then scored his second goal for the club on Portsmouth on 22 October 2011. On 3 December 2011, Gillett played against Southampton for the first time in his career, as Doncaster Rovers won 1–0. Gillett later scored the third goal of the season on 21 April 2012, in a 2–0 win over Coventry City. The 2011–12 season saw Gillett established himself in the first team at Doncaster Rovers and played every match throughout the season, as the club were relegated to League One. Despite Doncaster Rovers' relegation, Gillett was awarded for the South Yorkshire Writers' Player of the Season. However, Gillett was released by the club.

After leaving the club, Gillett returned to Doncaster Rovers when he went to training for the pre-season friendly. However, Gillett stated he ruled out on re-joining Doncaster Rovers.

=== Nottingham Forest ===
On 4 August 2012 it was announced he joined Nottingham Forest to team up with former Manager Sean O'Driscoll.

After missing out, due to injury, Gillett made his Nottingham Forest debut, making first start and playing 90 minutes, in a 1–0 win over Bristol City. Gillett established himself in the first team at Nottingham Forest under the management of Sean O'Driscoll until his sacking in late-December. Gillett soon lost his first team place under the management of Alex McLeish and Billy Davies later in the season, as he made twenty–five appearances for the club.

In the 2013–14 season, Gillett was rarely in the first team at Nottingham Forest, having been frozen out and made his first appearance of the season, in a 2–1 win over Millwall in the second round of the League Cup after the game went extra time. At the end of the season, Gillett was released by the club upon expiry to his contract.

=== Bristol City ===
With first team opportunities at Nottingham Forest increasingly limited, it was announced on 31 October 2013, Gillett signed for League One side Bristol City on loan until 28 January 2014

Gillett made his Bristol City debut on 2 November 2013, where he came on as a substitute for Ryan Taylor, in a 1–1 draw Oldham Athletic. His playing time at Bristol City would subsequently extended to the end of the season. Gillett went on to score his first Bristol City goal from a wonder strike on 1 March 2014, in a 2–1 win over Gillingham. After the match, Gillett described this as "his best goal yet". After serving a two match ban, Gillett returned to the first team and scored his second Bristol City goal in the last game of the season, in a 1– 1 draw against Crawley Town. At the end of the season, Gillett returned to his parent club.

=== Yeovil Town ===
On 7 August 2014, Gillett re-signed for Yeovil Town on a two-year contract, who just recently relegated from the Championship.

Gillett made his Yeovil Town debut in the opening game of the season, making his first start and playing 90 minutes, in a 3–0 loss against his former club, Doncaster Rovers. Three days later, Gillett scored his first Yeovil Town goal in the first round of League Cup, in a 2–1 loss against Gillingham. However, Gillett suffered an injury that kept him out throughout September. After making his first team return in a 2–0 against Milton Keynes Dons on 4 October 2014, Gillett then scored his first league goal on 13 December 2014, in a 4–0 win over Oldham Athletic and three days later, on 16 December 2014, Gillett scored again in the second round replay, in a 2–0 win over Accrington Stanley Gillett continued to be in the first team until he suffered a knee injury that kept him out for the rest of the season.

In his second season at Yeovil Town, Gillett switched shirt from 23 to 18. Gillett continued rehabilitating from his injury throughout the year and wasn't until in mid-December when he was one step closer from full recovery and made his first appearance of the season, appearing as an un-used substitute bench in the FA Replay against Carlisle United. Gillett then made his first appearance of the season on 30 January 2016, where he came on as a substitute for Liam Walsh in the 82nd minute, in a 3–2 win over Wimbledon. Gillett went on to make six appearances for the club.

On 5 March 2016, Gillett joined League One side Peterborough United on a one-month loan deal. Gillett made his Peterborough United debut on the same day, where he made his first start, in a 1–1 draw against Wigan Athletic. Gillett then extended his loan spell with Peterborough United until the end of April and went on to make five appearances for the club.

Upon returning to his parent club, Gillett was informed that he was released by Yeovil at the end of the 2015–16 season. Gillett later confirmed his departure via Twitter.

== Career statistics ==
Appearances and goals by club, season and competition
Club	Season	League			FA Cup		League Cup		Other		Total	
Club	Season	Division	Apps	Goals	Apps	Goals	Apps	Goals	Apps	Goals	Apps	Goals
Southampton	2005–06	Championship	0	0	1	0	0	0	—		1	0
Southampton	2006–07	Championship	0	0	0	0	0	0	—		0	0
Southampton	2007–08	Championship	2	0	0	0	0	0	—		2	0
Southampton	2008–09	Championship	27	0	1	0	2	0	—		30	0
Southampton	2009–10	League One	2	0	1	0	1	0	2 (Note: Appearances in Football League Trophy)	0	6	0
Southampton	Total		31	0	3	0	3	0	2	0	39	0
Walsall (loan)	2005–06	League One	2	0	0	0	0	0	0	0	2	0
Blackpool (loan)	2006–07	League One	31	1	0	0	0	0	3 (Note: Two appearances in Football League One play-offs, one appearance and one goal in Football League Trophy)	1	34	2
AFC Bournemouth (loan)	2006–07	League One	7	1	0	0	0	0	0	0	7	1
Yeovil Town (loan)	2007–08	League One	4	0	0	0	0	0	1	0	5	0
Doncaster Rovers (loan)	2009–10	Championship	11	0	0	0	0	0	—		11	0
Doncaster Rovers	2010–11	Championship	22	1	0	0	0	0	—		22	1
Doncaster Rovers	2011–12	Championship	46	3	0	0	2	0	—		48	3
Doncaster Rovers	Total		79	4	0	0	2	0	—		81	4
Nottingham Forest	2012–13	Championship	25	0	1	0	1	0	—		27	0
Nottingham Forest	2013–14	Championship	0	0	0	0	2	0	—		2	0
Nottingham Forest	Total		25	0	1	0	3	0	—		29	0
Bristol City (loan)	2013–14	League One	23	2	0	0	0	0	0	0	23	2
Yeovil Town	2014–15	League One	17	1	4	1	1	1	0	0	22	3
Yeovil Town	2015–16	League Two	6	0	0	0	0	0	0	0	6	0
Yeovil Town	Total		27	1	4	1	1	1	1	0	33	3
Peterborough United (loan)	2015–16	League One	5	0	0	0	0	0	0	0	5	0
Career total			230	9	8	1	9	1	6	1	253	12

== Honours ==
Blackpool

- Football League One play-offs: 2007

Southampton

- Football League Trophy: 2009–10
