= Leon Crouch =

English businessman (1949–2019)

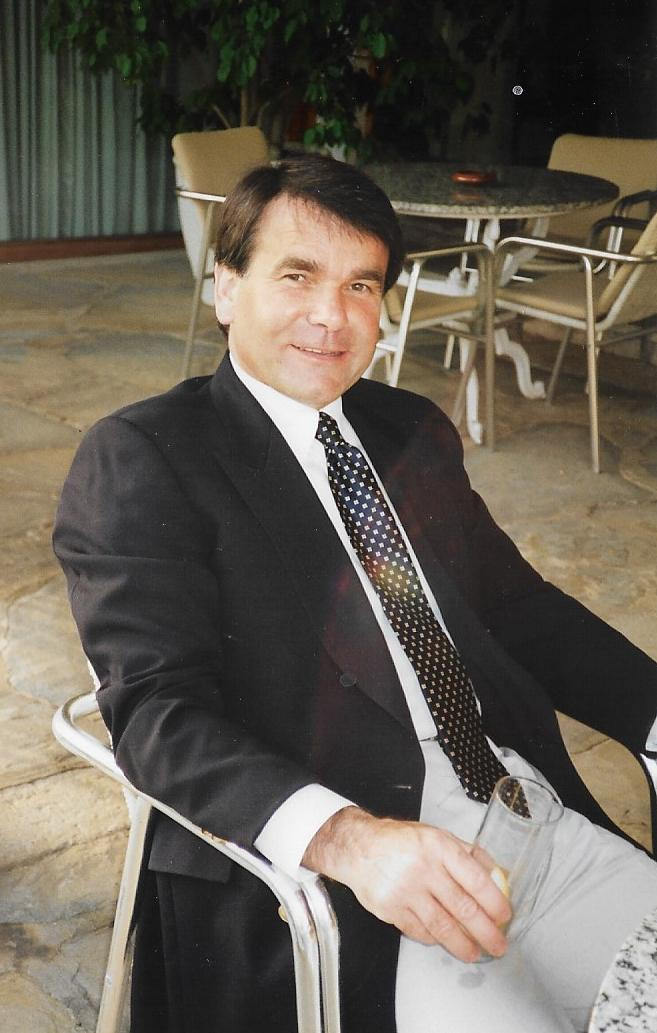
- Born: Leon Crouch; 16 August 1949
- Died: 13 September 2019 (aged 70); Oakhaven Hospice, Lymington
- Occupation: Businessman
- Known for: Chairman of Southampton

Leon Crouch (16 August 1949 – 13 September 2019) was an English businessman, who was formerly chairman of Southampton Football Club.

Crouch was the founder and chairman of the "Fullers Group" of companies which specialise in the manufacture, inspection and supply of precision engineered products, including machined components, fabrications, assemblies, kit sets and cold formed products for the telecommunications, medical, oil, defence, space, and marine industries.

Crouch was a lifelong Southampton fan and paid more than £1.6 million to purchase a significant stake in the club in 2006. He was acting chairman of Southampton until he was removed by the board in July 2007, but was re-appointed in December 2007, following Michael Wilde’s departure. Crouch was again forced to resign his position on 15 May 2008, when major shareholders, including Wilde and Rupert Lowe called an EGM requiring his removal. Whilst chairman of the club, Crouch paid personally for the replacement bronze statue of Saints legend Ted Bates which is now sited outside Southampton's St Mary's Stadium.

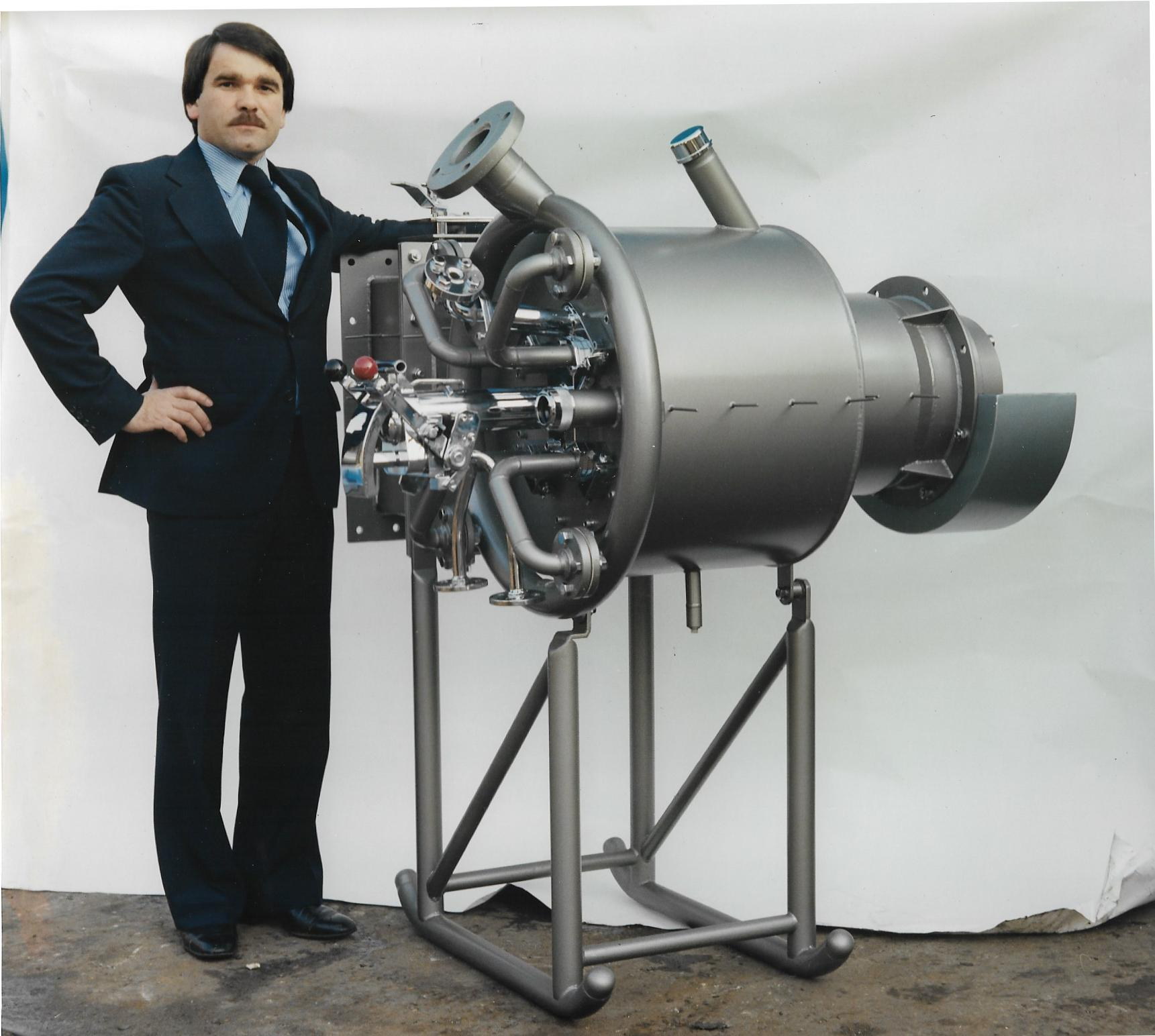

It was claimed by a representative of a Southampton Supporter's Club on Sky Sports News in late May 2009, that the only reason for Southampton's continued existence as a business was due to Leon Crouch putting money into the club "out of the goodness of his own heart".

He died of cancer on 13 September 2019. Following his death, in November 2019 Crouch was awarded the Forever Saint Award, with his daughter collecting the accolade.
