= Pelé (footballer, born 1978) =

Cape Verdean footballer (born 1978)

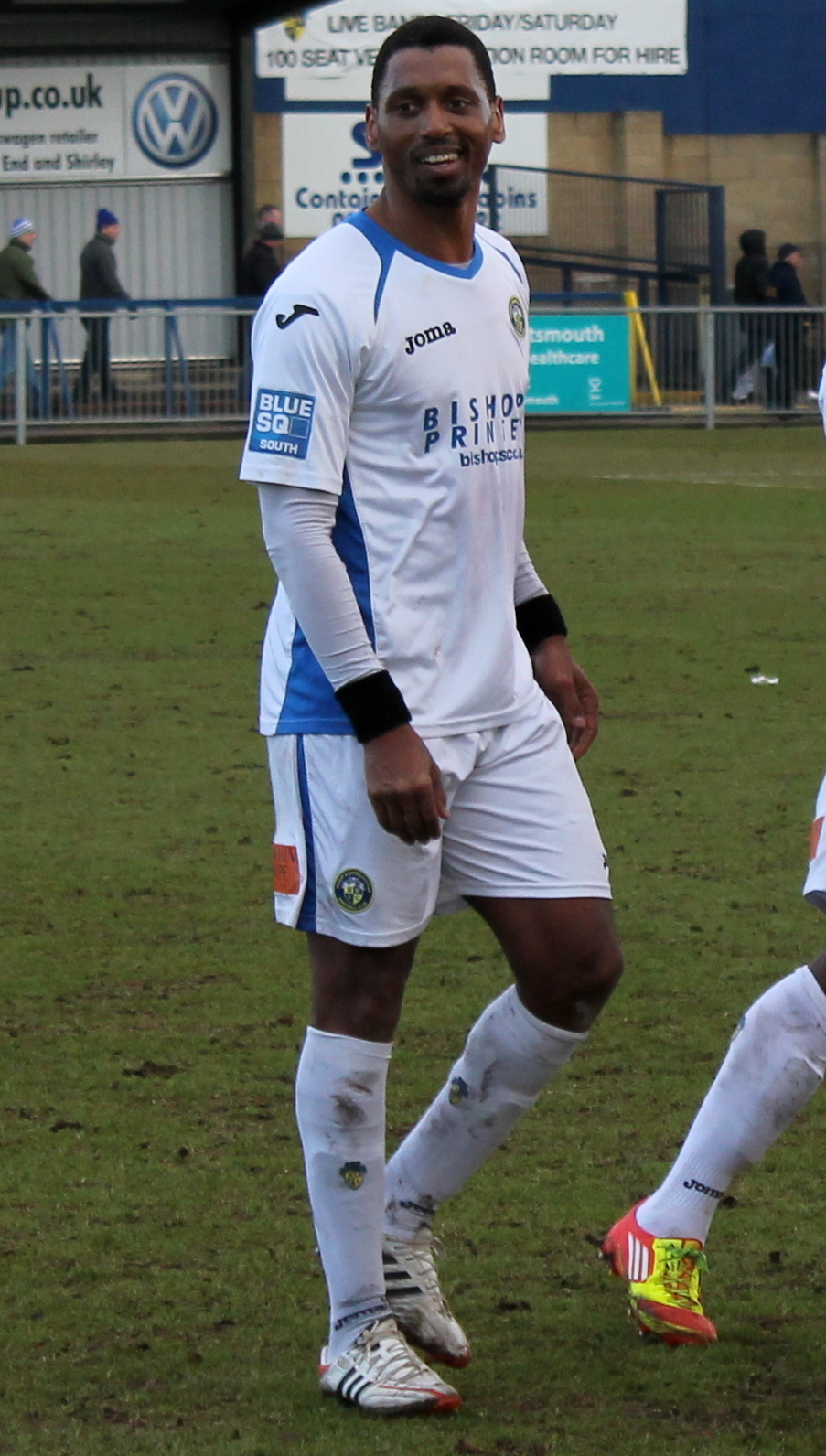
- Pelé playing for Havant & Waterlooville in 2013

Personal information
- Full name: Pedro Miguel Cardoso Monteiro
- Date of birth: 2 May 1978 (age 48)
- Place of birth: Albufeira, Portugal
- Height: 1.86 m (6 ft 1 in)
- Position: Centre-back

Youth career
- 1988–1996: Imortal

Senior career*
| Years | Team | Apps | (Gls) |
| 1996–2002 | Imortal | 126 | (8) |
| 2002–2003 | Farense | 28 | (2) |
| 2003–2006 | Belenenses | 84 | (1) |
| 2006–2007 | Southampton | 37 | (1) |
| 2007–2009 | West Bromwich Albion | 24 | (0) |
| 2009–2010 | Falkirk | 9 | (1) |
| 2010 | Milton Keynes Dons | 0 | (0) |
| 2011 | Northwich Victoria | 18 | (0) |
| 2011–2012 | Hednesford Town | 30 | (1) |
| 2012–2013 | Hayes & Yeading United | 44 | (1) |
| 2013–2016 | Havant & Waterlooville | 30 | (0) |
| 2016–2020 | Totton | | |
| Total | | 430 | (15) |

International career
| 2006–2009 | Cape Verde | 11 | (0) |
- * Club domestic league appearances and goals

Pedro Miguel Cardoso Monteiro (born 2 May 1978), commonly known as Pelé, is a former professional footballer who played as a central defender or a defensive midfielder.

He spent most of his 24-year senior career in England, appearing for West Bromwich Albion in the Premier League. He started playing with Imortal.

Born in Portugal, Pelé represented the Cape Verde national team at international level.

== Club career ==
=== Portugal ===
Born in Albufeira, Portugal, Pelé started playing professionally for local Imortal DC, moving to Algarve neighbours S.C. Farense after five seasons and spending one year in the Segunda Liga. He also played from 1999 to 2001 with his first club at that level.

Pelé joined C.F. Os Belenenses for 2003–04, making his Primeira Liga debut on 1 August 2003 in a 1–1 home draw with U.D. Leiria. The following campaign, already an important first-team element, he scored the game's only goal for the former at home against Sporting CP on 6 March 2005.

=== Southampton ===
Pelé signed for Southampton for an undisclosed fee – believed to be £1 million – on 19 July 2006. He had attracted the attention of Premiership club West Ham United and Portsmouth, but decided to opt for the potential of the Championship side, where he was likely to get more games.

On 30 December 2006, Pelé scored his first competitive goal for the Saints, against Leicester City. He started the season in his natural central defensive position but was eventually moved into defensive midfield, playing alongside Jermaine Wright while also moving back into defence to cover for injuries to Darren Powell and Claus Lundekvam.

=== West Bromwich Albion ===
On 9 August 2007, Pelé signed with West Bromwich Albion for £1 million on a two-year contract. He made his official debut as a second-half substitute in a 2–1 defeat away to Burnley, on the opening day of 2007–08.

Pelé made 13 starts during the campaign, in a promotion to the top flight.

=== Later years ===
Pelé was released by West Brom in the summer of 2009 following their relegation, with only three league appearances from the player. On 12 November, he moved to Falkirk of the Scottish Premiership as a free agent.

In August 2010, Pelé joined Milton Keynes Dons on a non-contract deal, as cover for injured Gary MacKenzie and suspended Mathias Kouo-Doumbé. He was released by the club the following month, without any league matches.

In January 2011, aged nearly 33, Pelé signed with Northwich Victoria of the Northern Premier League Premier Division on non-contract terms, and made his debut in a 1–0 win over Mickleover Sports. In June, he put his name on the PFA's free transfer availability list, indicating that he was seeking a new club.

Pelé left Hednesford Town on 8 January 2012, and joined Conference Premier's Hayes & Yeading United nine days later. He made his debut for his new team the same evening, against Ebbsfleet United.

In July 2016, 38-year-old Pelé signed for A.F.C. Totton from Havant & Waterlooville.

== International career ==
After turning down invitations in the past, Pelé accepted an invitation to play for Cape Verde, starting appearing for the nation in the 2008 Africa Cup of Nations qualification stage.

== Personal life ==
Pelé married Jo, with whom he had two children, Rhaianna (born 2008) and Taelan (2012). The couple also fostered a large number of children.

== Honours ==
West Bromwich Albion

- Football League Championship: 2007–08
