= Marek Saganowski =

Polish footballer (born 1978)

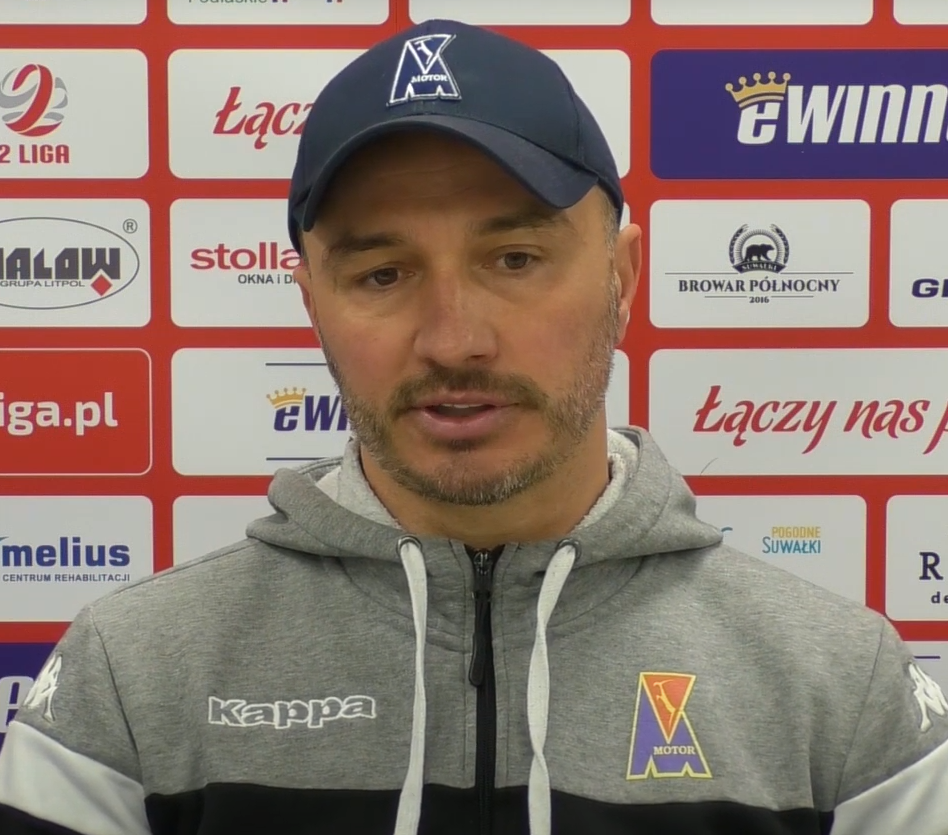
- Saganowski as manager of Motor Lublin in 2022

Personal information
- Full name: Marek Mirosław Saganowski
- Date of birth: 31 October 1978 (age 47)
- Place of birth: Łódź, Poland
- Height: 1.78 m (5 ft 10 in)
- Position: Striker

Senior career*
Years	Team	Apps	(Gls)
1994–2000	ŁKS Łódź	95	(30)
1996	→ Feyenoord (loan)	7	(0)
1997	→ Hamburger SV (loan)	4	(0)
2000–2001	Wisła Płock	23	(4)
2001–2002	Odra Wodzisław	30	(2)
2002–2005	Legia Warsaw	67	(41)
2005–2006	Vitória de Guimarães	32	(12)
2006–2007	Troyes	6	(0)
2007	→ Southampton (loan)	13	(10)
2007–2010	Southampton	55	(9)
2008	→ AaB (loan)	13	(3)
2010–2011	Atromitos	34	(5)
2011–2012	ŁKS Łódź	29	(6)
2012–2016	Legia Warsaw	68	(17)
2014–2015	Legia Warsaw II	2	(1)
Total		378	(140)

International career
1996–2012	Poland	35	(5)

Managerial career
- 2018–2019: Legia Warsaw (U19)
- 2020–2022: Motor Lublin
- 2022–2023: Pogoń Siedlce
- 2023: Wisła Płock
- 2024–2025: Zagłębie Sosnowiec
- * Club domestic league appearances and goals

Marek Mirosław Saganowski (Polish pronunciation: [ˈmarɛk miˈrɔswaf saɡaˈnɔfskʲi]; born 31 October 1978) is a Polish professional football manager and former player who played as a striker. He was most recently in charge of Zagłębie Sosnowiec.

In a much-travelled career, he represented clubs in Poland, Germany, the Netherlands, Portugal, France, England, Denmark and Greece.

Saganowski made his full international debut for Poland in 1996, earned 35 caps and scored 5 goals for his national side. He represented the nation at UEFA Euro 2008.

== Playing career ==
=== Poland ===
Saganowski was born in Łódź, Poland and began his career in 1994 with his local club ŁKS Łódź, playing there for six seasons, with brief loan spells at Feyenoord in 1996 and with Hamburger SV in early 1997. Neither of these loan spells was a particular success and he returned to ŁKS in the summer of 1997 to rebuild his career. In 1997–98, he made 22 appearances for ŁKS Łódź, but his career was interrupted by a serious motor-cycle accident in 1998 following which he was unable to walk. He slowly recovered from the injuries, and returned to playing for ŁKS Łódź, although his goal-scoring abilities did not recover initially.

He moved to Wisła Płock in 2000 and then to Odra Wodzisław the following year. He switched to Legia Warsaw in January 2003 where he returned to form, scoring 41 goals in 67 games. In 2005, he moved to Portugal's Vitoria Guimaraes where he notched 12 goals in his one season there.

=== Troyes ===
At the beginning of the 2006–07 season, he moved to French club Troyes AC for £1 million, but only made six substitute appearances for them and failed to score, spending most of his time in the reserves.

=== Southampton ===
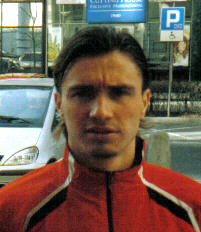
Saganowski with Southampton in August 2007

Saganowski joined Southampton initially on loan on 30 January 2007 until the end of the 2006–07 season. He made a successful start to his Saints career, scoring ten goals in his first 13 league games including a hat-trick in the 6–0 defeat of Wolverhampton Wanderers on 31 March 2007. His goals helped lift the Saints out of the doldrums they were in at the end of January and push them into a play-off position. Although he featured in both play-off games he failed to score despite hitting the post as Saints went out to Derby County in a penalty shoot-out.

He was signed on a permanent contract in the summer of 2007, but struggled for goalscoring form in the 2007–08 season, although he scored a vital goal against Sheffield United on the final day of the season helping to keep Southampton in the Championship. This was his first goal since the opening day of the season.

=== Aalborg BK ===
On 7 August 2008, Saganowski moved on loan for the season to the Danish SAS league club Aalborg BK. He made his debut for Aalborg on 13 August 2008 in the home match against FBK Kaunas in the Champions League third round qualifier, first leg. His first goal for Aalborg was in the Danish Cup against Brønshøj BK on 27 September 2008.

In total he scored five goals in 24 league and cup matches for Aalborg, of which three goals came in 13 league appearances. He played in all six of his club's Champions League group matches, including two against Manchester United and two against Celtic. Saganowski scored once in the Champions League, in a 6–3 defeat in Spain against Villarreal. His last match for Aalborg was the 2–2 Champions League draw at Old Trafford in December.

=== Return to Southampton ===
He returned to Southampton on 1 January 2009, and scored six times in his first seven matches following his recall to the side, against Doncaster Rovers, Norwich City and twice against Swansea City and Preston North End. He has stated his loyalty to Southampton and announced he wants to finish his career there. He said "I love the area, the city, the football club, and most of all the fans. I believe they are the greatest supporters in the country".

=== Atromitos Peristeriou ===
On 26 January 2010, Atromitos Peristeriou signed the Polish forward from Southampton until 2012 on a free transfer.

=== ŁKS Łódź ===
In June 2011, he re-joined his first club ŁKS Łódź on a two-year contract.

== International career ==
He has also appeared 33 times for the Poland national football team, scoring five goals. He made appearances in all three of Poland's games at Euro 2008, including two starts.

To this day, he is the only Polish footballer to score for a two-digit score, when he scored the goal against San Marino in Poland's 10–0 victory.

== Career statistics ==
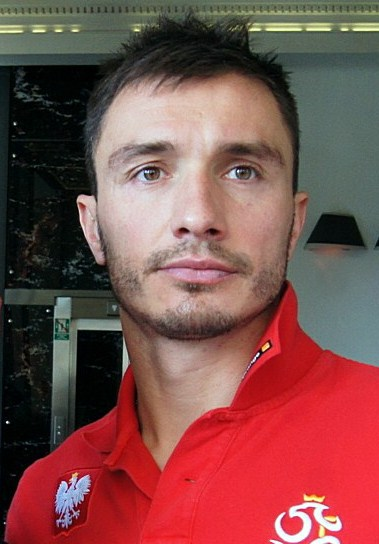
Saganowski in 2012 with Poland

=== International ===
Appearances and goals by national team and year
National team	Year	Apps	Goals
Poland
Poland	1996	4	0
Poland	1998	3	0
Poland	2003	5	0
Poland	2004	1	0
Poland	2005	2	2
Poland	2006	1	1
Poland	2007	4	0
Poland	2008	8	0
Poland	2009	5	2
Poland	2012	2	0
Total		35	5

Scores and results list Poland's goal tally first, score column indicates score after each Saganowski goal.

List of international goals scored by Marek Saganowski
No.	Date	Venue	Opponent	Score	Result	Competition
1	26 March 2005	Warsaw, Poland	Azerbaijan	7–0	8–0	2006 FIFA World Cup qualification
2	26 March 2005	Warsaw, Poland	Azerbaijan	8–0	8–0	2006 FIFA World Cup qualification
3	14 May 2006	Wronki, Poland	Faroe Islands	3–0	4–0	Friendly
4	28 March 2009	Belfast, Northern Ireland	Northern Ireland	2–3	2–3	2010 FIFA World Cup qualification
5	1 April 2009	Kielce, Poland	San Marino	10–0	10–0	2010 FIFA World Cup qualification

== Managerial statistics ==
As of match played 3 May 2025

Managerial record by team and tenure
Team	From	To	Record							
Team	From	To	G	W	D	L	GF	GA	GD	Win %
Motor Lublin	6 April 2021	8 June 2022	58	26	18	14	92	61	+31	44.83
Pogoń Siedlce	25 October 2022	16 May 2023	17	9	5	3	20	15	+5	52.94
Wisła Płock	16 May 2023	25 October 2023	15	4	4	7	17	25	−8	26.67
Zagłębie Sosnowiec	5 April 2024	5 May 2025	39	11	10	18	48	59	−11	28.21
Total			129	50	37	42	177	160	+17	38.76

== Honours ==
ŁKS Łódź

- Ekstraklasa: 1997–98

Legia Warsaw

- Ekstraklasa: 2012–13, 2013–14, 2015–16
- Polish Cup: 2012–13, 2014–15, 2015–16

Individual

- Polish Cup top scorer: 2012–13
- Ekstraklasa Player of the Month: September 2012
