= 2012–13 Southampton F.C. season =

Southampton F.C.
2012–13 season
- Chairman: Nicola Cortese
- Manager: Nigel Adkins (until 18 January 2013); Mauricio Pochettino (from 18 January 2013)
- Stadium: St Mary's Stadium
- Premier League: 14th
- FA Cup: Third round
- League Cup: Fourth round
- Top goalscorer: League: Rickie Lambert (15); All: Rickie Lambert (15)
- Highest home attendance: League: 32,070 vs Liverpool (16 March 2013); All: 32,070 vs Liverpool (16 March 2013)
- Lowest home attendance: League: 28,004 vs Fulham (7 October 2012); All: 9,890 v Sheffield Wednesday (25 September 2012)
- Average home league attendance: League: 30,874; All: 29,729
Home colours	Away colours	Third colours

The 2012–13 Southampton F.C. season was the club's 14th season in the Premier League, and their 36th at the top level of English football. Having achieved consecutive promotions from League One and the Championship the previous two seasons, the club were looking to retain their place in the Premier League after a seven-year absence from the top flight. Southampton finished 14th in the league table, five points above the relegation zone. They also made it to the fourth round of the League Cup, and were eliminated from the FA Cup in the third round by Chelsea.

In preparation for their first season back in the top flight, Southampton strengthened their squad relatively heavily during the summer transfer window, breaking the club's transfer fee record twice with the acquisitions of Burnley striker Jay Rodriguez in July and Uruguayan midfielder Gastón Ramírez from Bologna on deadline day. Other significant additions included Rangers midfielder Steven Davis, Japanese defender Maya Yoshida, and young full-back Nathaniel Clyne. Several players were released at the start of the campaign, while Dan Harding was the only player sold by the club, moving to Nottingham Forest in July. Norwegian centre-back Vegard Forren was signed in January 2013, although did not make an appearance during his first season at the club.

Southampton began their first top-flight campaign in seven years against reigning champions Manchester City and runners-up Manchester United, and picked up only four points from their opening ten games leaving them firmly at the bottom of the table. In November and December the team's fortunes improved, and they picked up important wins over fellow strugglers to lift themselves out of the relegation zone. After Christmas the Saints went on a six-game unbeaten run, and they later picked up high-profile wins against Manchester City, Liverpool and Chelsea to continue to move away from the drop zone. Survival in the Premier League was confirmed on 14 May when Wigan Athletic lost to Arsenal to take the final relegation place. Southampton finished 14th in the table having won nine, drawn 14, and lost 15 of their 38 games, collecting 41 points in the process.

Despite leading Southampton to back-to-back promotions in 2011 and 2012, manager Nigel Adkins was fired in January 2013, with the club in 15th place in the Premier League table, and was replaced by former Espanyol boss Mauricio Pochettino. Along with the manager, the majority of Adkins's coaching team were also dismissed, replaced by staff of Pochettino's appointment. The winner of the club's Player of the Season award was Morgan Schneiderlin, who was voted in ahead of top scorer Rickie Lambert and midfield partner Jack Cork.

== Pre-season ==
Southampton began their pre-season preparations on 14 July 2012 with the second Markus Liebherr Memorial Cup (in memory of the former Southampton owner Markus Liebherr, which this year featured fellow Premier League club Arsenal and Belgian Pro League champions Anderlecht. In the first match of the tournament, Southampton lost to Anderlecht 1–0, with the only goal coming early in the first half from striker Tom De Sutter. Arsenal won their first game against Anderlecht by the same scoreline, with a goal from young midfielder Henri Lansbury deciding the match. Southampton scored their first goal of the 2012 pre-season in their final match against Arsenal, when new signing Jay Rodriguez converted a Danny Fox cross in the 31st minute, although the lead proved short-lived when Gervinho equalised a few minutes later, causing the game to end in a tie. Despite winning the subsequent penalty shoot-out, the Saints could not overhaul the points lead of their opponents and it was Arsenal who won the second Memorial Cup and joined Athletic Bilbao on the honours list.

Travelling to a French training camp later in the month, the Saints played Étoile Carouge on 18 July and faced Evian Thonon Gaillard on 21 July. In the first match, Southampton came back from a 1–0 deficit to win 4–1, with a goal from Luke Shaw and a late hat-trick from Billy Sharp. In the second, the Saints won by a single first-half goal from Jason Puncheon. Back in England, St Mary's hosted Dutch champions Ajax on 28 July, with the visitors securing a 1–0 win with a second half goal from winger Aras Özbiliz. On 4 August recently relegated Wolverhampton Wanderers travelled to face Southampton, with the home side winning 2–0 thanks to goals from Billy Sharp and midfielder Jason Puncheon.

Southampton travelled away for their penultimate pre-season friendly, facing Bristol City on 7 August. Jon Stead opened the scoring for the home side late in the first half with a long range goal, and the side nearly doubled their lead before the break but for a Nathaniel Clyne block in the penalty area. The second half was shared relatively evenly between the sides, and it took until stoppage time for the Saints to come back and leave the game level courtesy of striker Billy Sharp. The club's final pre-season game was played at St Mary's on 11 August against Italian club Udinese. Despite enjoying a large portion of possession throughout the game, it was the visitors who took the spoils in indulgent fashion with a 4–0 win over the Saints. Udinese went one up after 12 minutes with a long range effort from captain Antonio Di Natale, and doubled their lead another 12 minutes later with a similar long range strike from Brazilian midfielder Willians. Yet another 12 minutes later, Di Natale scored his second and the team's third to put Udinese three up at half time. Ultimately, Southampton were unable to respond, and in the 64th minute Colombian striker Luis Muriel scored Udinese's fourth to mark a disappointing end to a relatively successful pre-season campaign for Southampton.

14 July 2012 Markus Liebherr Memorial Cup	Southampton	0–1	Anderlecht	Southampton
17:15 BST		Report	De Sutter 15'	Stadium: St Mary's Stadium; Attendance: 13,056; Referee: Phil Crossley

14 July 2012 Markus Liebherr Memorial Cup	Southampton	1–1 (5–4 p)	Arsenal	Southampton
20:00 BST	Rodriguez 31'	Report	Gervinho 35'	Stadium: St Mary's Stadium; Attendance: 13,056
	Penalties
	Fox (penalty scored); Rodriguez (penalty scored); Seaborne (penalty scored); Chaplow (penalty scored); Hammond (penalty scored)		(penalty scored) Santos; (penalty scored) Coquelin; (penalty scored) Olsson; (penalty scored) Eastmond; (penalty missed) Ebecilio
Note: Arsenal win the Memorial Cup

18 July 2012 Friendly	Étoile Carouge	1–4	Southampton	Carouge, Switzerland
18:00 BST	Hooiveld 38' (o.g.)	Report	Shaw 54'; Sharp 70', 76', 84'	Stadium: Stade de la Fontenette; Referee: Nicholas Jancevski (Switzerland)

21 July 2012 Friendly	Evian Thonon Gaillard	0–1	Southampton	Thonon-les-Bains, France
18:00 BST		Report	Puncheon 36'	Stadium: Stade Joseph-Moynat; Attendance: 828; Referee: Wilfried Bien (France)

28 July 2012 Friendly	Southampton	0–1	Ajax	Southampton
15:00 BST		Report	Özbiliz 65'	Stadium: St Mary's Stadium; Attendance: 5,713; Referee: Lee Probert (Wiltshire)

4 August 2012 Friendly	Southampton	2–0	Wolverhampton Wanderers	Southampton
15:00 BST	Sharp 22'; Puncheon 69'	Report		Stadium: St Mary's Stadium; Attendance: 3,978; Referee: Andy Davies

7 August 2012 Friendly	Bristol City	1–1	Southampton	Bristol
19:45 BST	Stead 36'	Report	Sharp 90+2'	Stadium: Ashton Gate Stadium; Attendance: 2,605; Referee: Brendan Malone

11 August 2012 Friendly	Southampton	0–4	Udinese	Southampton
19:00 BST		Report	Di Natale 12', 36'; Willians 24'; Muriel 64'	Stadium: St Mary's Stadium; Attendance: 3,744; Referee: Mike Dean (Cheshire)

== Premier League ==
=== August–October 2012 ===
Manchester City (19 August 2012)

Southampton began their first season back in the Premier League on 19 August against title holders Manchester City. The game began well for the visitors, who put a lot of pressure on City early on, before defender Jos Hooiveld gave away a penalty for a 16th-minute foul. David Silva missed the penalty, but after a period of heavy possession for the hosts the first goal was scored by striker Carlos Tevez five minutes before half time. Ten minutes into the second half Rickie Lambert was brought on as a substitute, and within three minutes he had scored the equaliser in a move involving forward Guly do Prado and young midfielder James Ward-Prowse. Southampton went ahead just under ten minutes later, when second substitute Steven Davis scored on his league debut for the club, although the lead was cut short after just four minutes by substitute striker Edin Džeko, and the hosts retained the lead in the 80th minute courtesy of Samir Nasri. Despite additional chances for both sides, Southampton could not equalise again and the game ended 3–2 to the reigning Premier League champions.

Wigan Athletic (25 August 2012)

In their Premier League return to St Mary's, Southampton hosted Wigan Athletic on 25 August. Despite boasting a few clear goalscoring opportunities in the first half, including an Adam Lallana shot which hit the crossbar, the Saints were unable to break the deadlock in the first period and the teams went into half time level. It was the visitors who came out in the second half firing however, as Franco Di Santo broke the deadlock six minutes after the break with a powerful shot from inside the area. With chances opening for both sides, Athletic put the game beyond the hosts in the last minute, when a defensive error gave Ivorian Arouna Koné the chance to end the game, leaving Southampton in the relegation zone.

Manchester United (2 September 2012)

On 2 September the Saints hosted last season's runners-up Manchester United in their third game on the season. Rickie Lambert opened the scoring for the home side with his second goal of the season in the 16th minute, heading in a Jason Puncheon cross. The lead was cancelled out just seven minutes later however, as new United signing Robin van Persie equalised. The first half ended level, and it took until the 55th minute for the deadlock to be broken, with Morgan Schneiderlin putting Southampton ahead for the second time in the match. 15 minutes later the visitors were awarded a penalty due to a foul by Jos Hooiveld on Van Persie, although it was saved by Kelvin Davis to keep Saints ahead. In the 87th minute however, Van Persie scored his second of the match to equalise for the second time, and he completed a hat-trick in stoppage time to secure United's win and subject the Saints to their third loss in three games, leaving them bottom of the table as the only club yet to have picked up a point.

Arsenal (15 September 2012)

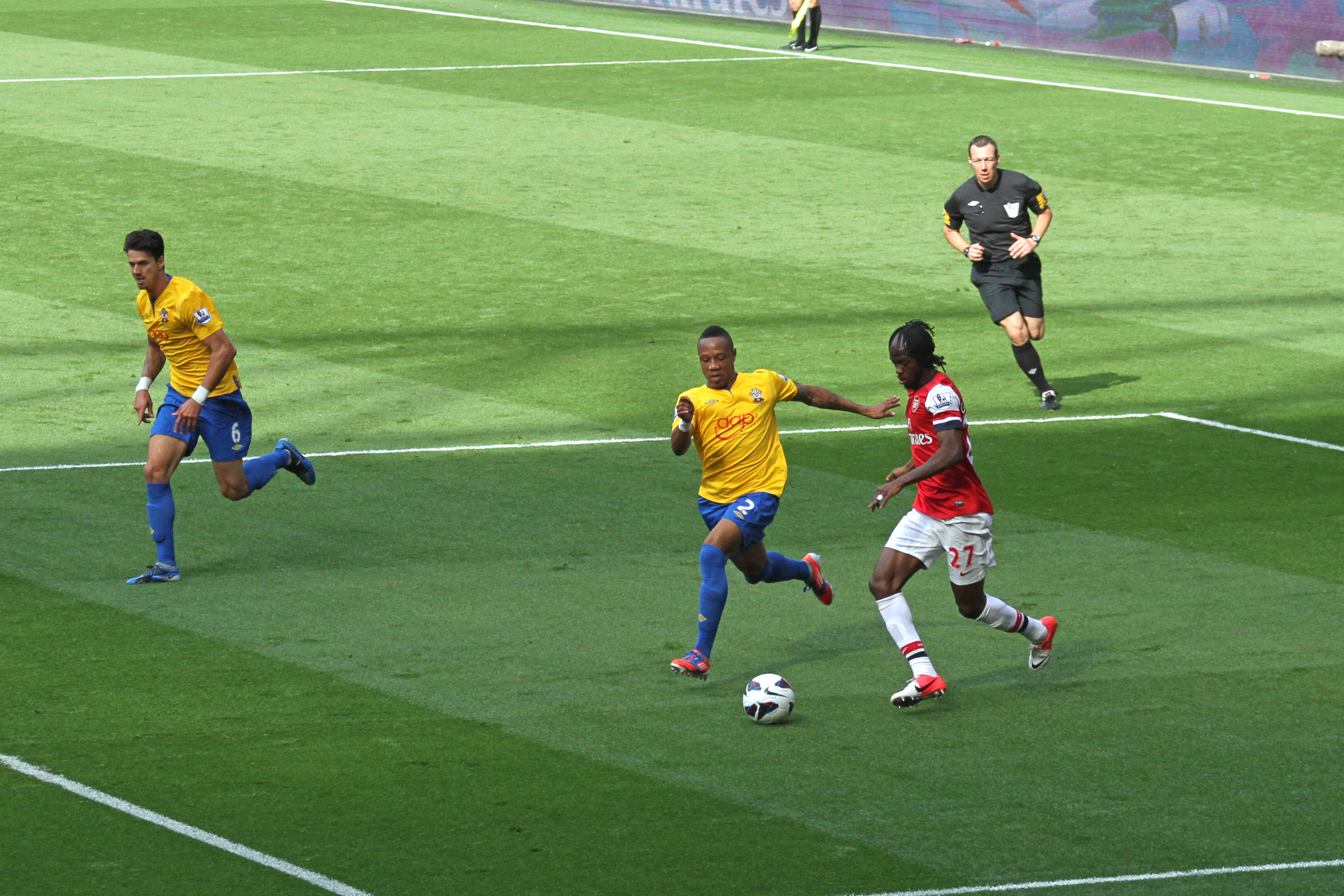
Southampton's 6–1 loss at Arsenal is the biggest defeat of their season.

Following a two-week international break, Southampton travelled to the Emirates Stadium to face Arsenal on 15 September. The match started poorly for the travelling Saints, as the home side went one up in the 11th minute when Jos Hooiveld deflected in Kieran Gibbs's saved shot to score an own goal. Just 20 minutes later Lukas Podolski scored a free kick following a foul on Francis Coquelin by Steven Davis, starting off a hugely negative ten-minute period for the visitors – within four more minutes it was 3–0 to the home side when Gervinho added his name to the scoresheet, and two minutes later Nathaniel Clyne scored the second own goal of the game to put Arsenal 4–0 up. Just before the break Danny Fox scored his first goal for Southampton, taking advantage of a mistake by Arsenal goalkeeper Wojciech Szczęsny to give the Saints a first half consolation. Southampton started better in the second half, but could not break through the defence of the home side, who went 5–1 up after 71 minutes with Gervinho scoring his second of the match. Former Southampton winger Theo Walcott finished off the match with an 88th-minute conversion, leaving the Saints at the bottom of the table still with no points.

Aston Villa (22 September 2012)

On 22 September Southampton hosted Aston Villa, in a match which they had to win in order to avoid their worst ever start to a season. After a relatively even first half hour, it was Villa who broke the deadlock in the 36th minute when Darren Bent took advantage of a defensive error to score, putting the visitors one up going into half time. The Saints started the second half much more aggressively though, and in the 58th minute equalised courtesy of a Rickie Lambert strike. With the added momentum, Southampton went ahead five minutes later when Nathaniel Clyne scored his first goal for the club, with Gastón Ramírez providing the assist for the goal. Jason Puncheon put the club 3–1 up another nine minutes later, with Lambert and Ramírez working together to provide the assist for the goal. Lambert scored his second of the match from the penalty spot in stoppage time, and the Saints saw the game out until the end to pick up their first points of the season and move out of the relegation zone.

Everton (29 September 2012)

The following week Southampton travelled to Goodison Park to face Everton, who had won three out of their opening five games of the season. The Saints started strongly, when Gastón Ramírez scored his first goal for the club in the sixth minute when he headed in Adam Lallana's corner. The visitors looked set for another goal from Jay Rodriguez a few minutes later, but it was Everton who scored next when Leon Osman equalised in the 25th minute. Southampton suffered defensive troubles throughout the rest of the first half, and within seven minutes Everton were two up courtesy of a goal from Nikica Jelavić. The home side doubled their lead just six minutes later, when Jelavić headed in his second goal to put Everton 3–1 up at the end of the first half. Despite a number of chances in the second period for Rickie Lambert, Jay Rodriguez and Adam Lallana, Southampton could not beat the Everton defence and dropped another three points and one position in the table.

Fulham (7 October 2012)

On 7 October Southampton hosted Fulham before the second international break of the season. The Saints started the game well, as defender José Fonte scored in the fourth minute with a header from Adam Lallana's corner to put the home side a goal up early. A few minutes later, right-back Frazer Richardson had to leave the game with a leg injury, and was replaced with centre-back Jos Hooiveld with Maya Yoshida moving to the right side of defence. Southampton continued to dominate the rest of the first half, with Rickie Lambert and Jason Puncheon coming close to increasing the team's lead, but the score remained 1–0 going into half time. Fulham improved after the break, and in the 69th minute the visitors equalised when Jos Hooiveld turned John Arne Riise's shot into his own goal. Rickie Lambert was taken off, which notably reduced Southampton's goal threat, and Kieran Richardson scored a second for Fulham in the 88th minute. José Fonte scored again, however, to level the match when he headed in Danny Fox's cross in the last minute of normal time, and the match ended 2–2.

West Ham United (20 October 2012)

The Premier League resumed on 20 October, when Southampton travelled to face West Ham United at the Boleyn Ground. Concern was raised by fans due to manager Nigel Adkins's decisions to include goalkeeper Artur Boruc in the team and to leave Rickie Lambert out of the team, but in the first half the Saints performed strongly and looked the more likely side to score. The half ended goalless, but within three minutes after the break the travelling side were 2–0 down to the hosts, thanks to goals from midfielder Mark Noble and captain Kevin Nolan. 15 minutes later Adam Lallana scored his first goal of the season, before Lambert and Emmanuel Mayuka came on as substitutes to bolster the attacking strength of the side. Lambert had a few quick chances, but the comeback was short-lived as Noble converted from the penalty spot after a José Fonte handball. West Ham continued the dominance when they scored a fourth just before the end courtesy of a Modibo Maïga effort, and the match ended 4–1 to leave Southampton just above the relegation zone (although due to another result later in the day they dropped down to 18th).

Tottenham Hotspur (28 October 2012)

Southampton returned to St Mary's on 28 October to host Tottenham Hotspur, sitting in 19th place in the Premier League due to results the day before. The game started poorly for the Saints, as they went behind in the 15th minute to a goal from former Southampton player Gareth Bale, who headed in a Tom Huddlestone cross to put Spurs ahead. The visitors continued to take charge of the first half, with Bale receiving and creating many additional chances, many for striker Jermain Defoe, and the run of play finally culminated in a second goal for the visitors when Clint Dempsey followed up a Defoe shot in the 39th minute. After more domination by the visitors in the second half, the hosts finally pulled a goal back courtesy of Jay Rodriguez in the 66th minute, who converted a chance following a shot by José Fonte saved by Brad Friedel. Southampton continued to put pressure on Tottenham, with more chances for Lambert and Rodriguez, but it wasn't enough to bring them out of the relegation zone.

=== November–December 2012 ===
West Bromwich Albion (5 November 2012)

On 5 November Southampton travelled to face West Bromwich Albion able to move out of the relegation zone with a win thanks to the draw between Reading and Queens Park Rangers the day before. The game started with both sides relatively evenly matched, but it was the home side who broke the deadlock nine minutes before the break courtesy of Peter Odemwingie. After half time it was the Saints who had the early chances, with Lambert hitting the crossbar as soon as the game resumed, but more defensive problems led to a second goal for the hosts, again from Odemwingie. West Brom continued to enjoy chances throughout the rest of the game, but it ended 2–0 to leave Southampton bottom of the league.

Swansea City (10 November 2012)

After two losses in a week, including elimination from the League Cup, Southampton returned to St Mary's on 10 November to host Swansea City. In a game which featured the league debut of Luke Shaw, as well as the first league game of the season for Jack Cork, the Saints dominated possession and goal-scoring chances in the first half but failed to break the deadlock before the break. After half time Southampton continued to play well, with a penalty possibility for Adam Lallana turned down ten minutes after the break, before Morgan Schneiderlin headed in a cross from Rickie Lambert to score his second goal of the season and go 1–0 up against the Welsh side. Despite more chances for the home side, however, former Saints player Nathan Dyer scored to equalise for the visitors following a mistake by goalkeeper Paulo Gazzaniga. The game remained 1–1, despite more chances for both sides, and due to other results the Saints moved off the bottom of the table with only their fifth point of the season.

Queens Park Rangers (17 November 2012)

The following week Southampton travelled to Loftus Road to face Queens Park Rangers, the only team lower in the table than the Saints. The game started well for the visitors, who dominated possession for the first half and enjoyed the majority of the goal-scoring opportunities and attacking play. The positive start led to a goal for Rickie Lambert in the 23rd minute, putting Southampton 1–0 up and on the way to only their second win of the season. Just before the half time break, Jason Puncheon made it 2–0 for the Saints with a solo strike beating QPR goalkeeper Júlio César. Early into the second half however, Southampton conceded a goal when Canadian winger Junior Hoilett took advantage of individual mistakes to bring the home side back into the game. The remainder of the second half was relatively even, with both sides having a number of chances to score, but it was Southampton who eventually scored another when Morgan Schneiderlin took a shot in the 83rd minute which was deflected in by defender Anton Ferdinand.

Newcastle United (25 November 2012)

On Sunday 25 November Southampton hosted Newcastle United in a match which saw the first return of former Saints manager Alan Pardew since his dismissal in August 2010. After half an hour of chances either way, including a Rickie Lambert free kick which hit the crossbar and a strong Jason Puncheon chance, the hosts went ahead in the 35th minute when captain Adam Lallana took advantage of a mistake by Newcastle goalkeeper Tim Krul to put Southampton 1–0 up. After the break the visitors increased their attacking presence, but it was Southampton who scored next when Gastón Ramírez took advantage of another mistake by Krul from a Jason Puncheon cross to put the home side 2–0 up in the 60th minute. The Southampton side were frustrated by a number of decisions by the officials in the match, with Ramírez being denied two penalties following his goal. Puncheon also hit the post again, and José Fonte missed out on his third goal of the season thanks to the crossbar. Jay Rodriguez scored late in the game, but was offside when the ball was played to him, and 2–0 it remained for the Saints to pick up their third win of the season, including their first clean sheet, to move out of the relegation zone for the first time in over a month.

Norwich City (28 November 2012)

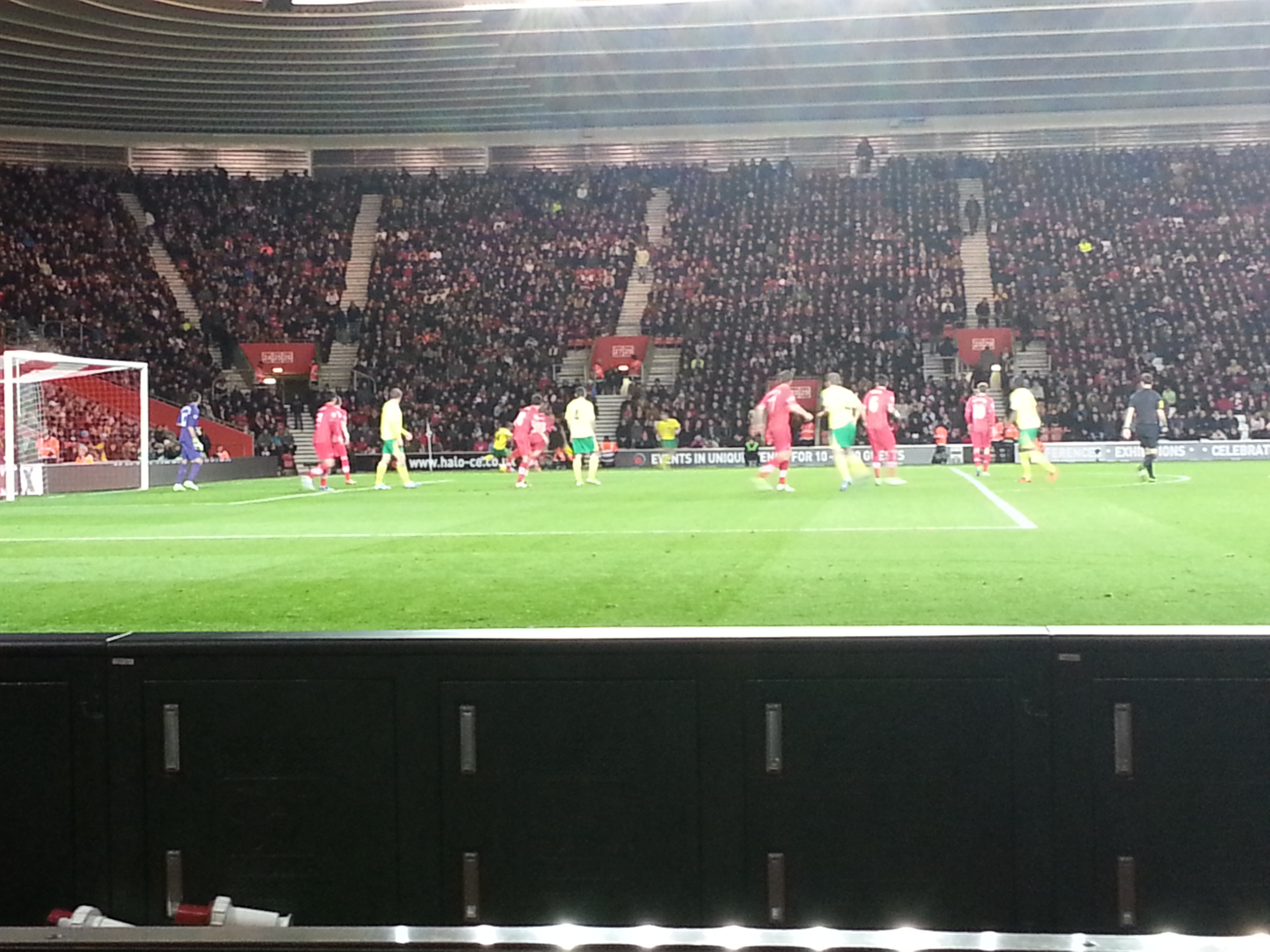
The Saints hosted Norwich City after two consecutive wins, but failed to break the deadlock and drew 1–1.

Three days later, the Saints hosted Norwich City looking for a third consecutive win. The game started well for the home side, who dominated possession in the early stages and broke the deadlock in the 32nd minute when Rickie Lambert converted a chance from an Adam Lallana free kick. On the stroke of half time though, Robert Snodgrass equalised for the visitors to put a dampener on the spirits of the players going into the break. In the second period Norwich came out with much more confidence, and shut Southampton out of the game for a large period, with the defence weakening quickly. Southampton and Norwich were held in the deadlock though, with the sides sharing the spoils and the hosts failing to move out of the top relegation spot again.

Liverpool (1 December 2012)

On 1 December the Saints travelled to Anfield to face Liverpool, who had lost in midweek to Tottenham Hotspur. The hosts dominated the majority of the match, although were unable to break the deadlock until Daniel Agger headed in a Glen Johnson cross just before half time. Throughout the second half Liverpool continued to enjoy goal-scoring chances, particularly for Luis Suárez, and it ended 1–0 with Southampton having very few chances at all to equalise.

Reading (8 December 2012)

Southampton returned to St Mary's the following week to face Reading, who sat just three points behind 18th-placed Southampton in 19th position in the table. The game started relatively evenly with a number of chances for each side, with the home side's best chance coming after half an hour when Jason Puncheon turned in a corner to score a goal then disallowed for pushing in the penalty area. Just before half time team captain Adam Lallana received an injury, and was replaced by Gastón Ramírez who had not started the match. After the break the Saints continued to pressure the visitors, and in the 61st minute Jason Puncheon finally broke the deadlock to put Southampton one up. More chances went the way of the Saints, including late chances for Guly do Prado and Jack Cork, and ultimately the side held on to pick up the three points and move out of the relegation zone once again.

Sunderland (22 December 2012)

After a weekend without a game due to Chelsea's FIFA Club World Cup commitments, Southampton returned to St Mary's on 22 December to face Sunderland, who sat just one position above them in the table. The game, which saw the first Premier League start for striker Emmanuel Mayuka, started quickly, but after the first ten minutes there were very few opportunities for either side to score goals and win the match. Sunderland striker Steven Fletcher scored just before half time, and the goal was enough to win the game for the visitors with very little action occurring in the second period. As Wigan Athletic had lost earlier in the day, Southampton remained just above the relegation zone, three points behind Aston Villa in 16th.

Fulham (26 December 2012)

Four days later, Southampton travelled to Craven Cottage to face Fulham in the Boxing Day fixture. The game started poorly for the Saints, who conceded after only eight minutes when Dimitar Berbatov converted from inside the six-yard box to put the hosts up by one goal. The first half saw very few additional chances for either side, and Fulham went into half time a goal to the better. The second half was relatively uneventful, until in the 85th minute Southampton were awarded a penalty due to a handball by former Saints player Chris Baird. Rickie Lambert scored the penalty, and in the last few minutes Gastón Ramírez also came close, but ultimately it ended 1–1.

Stoke City (29 December 2012)

For their last fixture of 2012, Southampton travelled to face Stoke City on 29 December. The game started well for the Saints, who went ahead after only ten minutes when top scorer Rickie Lambert converted a cross from Guly do Prado on the left of midfield in the injured Adam Lallana's place. Former Southampton striker Kenwyne Jones pulled one back for the hosts six minutes later, but this was cancelled out by another goal for the visitors courtesy of second striker Jay Rodriguez from a Lambert setup. Just after ten minutes later, Southampton went 3–1 up when Lambert's penalty area shot was converted into the Stoke goal by defender Andy Wilkinson, and the Saints went into the break two goals to the better. The second half saw a similar frequency of chances for each side, but it was Stoke who enjoyed the next break when Matthew Upson scored in the 67th minute after linking up with first goalscorer Jones. After 70 minutes French midfielder Steven Nzonzi was sent off for a foul on Jack Cork, although the away side made some defensive substitutions in an attempt to hold the lead to become the first side of the season to win at the Britannia Stadium; in the final minute of normal time, however, another former Southampton striker, Peter Crouch, set up Cameron Jerome to score another equaliser. Despite seven minutes of injury time being added on, Southampton could not score again, and Stoke almost clinched a winner, meaning the Saints moved back into the relegation zone with Wigan Athletic moving up to 17th.

=== January–February 2013 ===
Arsenal (1 January 2013)

In their first fixture of 2013, Southampton hosted Arsenal in the return leg of their 6–1 thrashing earlier in the season. From the start Arsenal played quickly to try and mount the pressure on the Saints, but the home side made it difficult for the Gunners to break through the defence and eventually broke the deadlock themselves when Gastón Ramírez took advantage of some weak defending to put Southampton in front. The lead was not held for long however, as just over six minutes later a Theo Walcott free kick was turned into his own net by singer Guly do Prado to bring Arsenal on level terms. After the break Southampton continued to enjoy the majority of possession, and Ramírez came close to a second goal on a number of occasions, although in the end it finished 1–1 to pull Southampton out of the relegation zone going into a break from league football for the FA Cup.

Aston Villa (12 January 2013)

After a break for FA Cup and League Cup ties, Premier League matches resumed on 12 January, with Southampton travelling to Villa Park for the return leg against Aston Villa, another side looking to avoid relegation. The Saints looked to take advantage of Villa's inexperienced defence, and almost opened the scoring on a number of occasions in the opening half an hour with the dual strike force of Rickie Lambert and Jay Rodriguez, who had scored Southampton's goal in the FA Cup defeat to Chelsea. In the 33rd minute, a controversial penalty was awarded to the visitors when Rodriguez was seen to have been brought down in the area by Enda Stevens, and Lambert converted the spot kick for his ninth goal of the season to put the Saints ahead. The home side increased the pressure in the second half, with Christian Benteke almost scoring after taking advantage of an Artur Boruc parry, and Charles N'Zogbia also came close to equalising. Luke Shaw picked up an injury late on, and Nathan Baker had Villa's final chance in injury time when he hit the woodwork with a header, but ultimately Southampton held on to pick up three points and move to relative safety in 15th.

Chelsea (16 January 2013)

Just 11 days after facing them at St Mary's in the FA Cup, which they lost 5–1, Southampton travelled to Stamford Bridge to face third-placed Chelsea in their game-in-hand. In a match which saw Lambert and Ramírez left on the bench, both sides were evenly matched with the Saints holding a lot of possession while the hosts enjoyed the majority of goal-scoring opportunities. Demba Ba broke the deadlock in the 25th minute, taking advantage of clumsy defending to volley home from inside the penalty area, before Eden Hazard scored a similar goal in similar circumstances to make it two on the stroke of half time. The visitors came out with much more confidence in the second period, and within two minutes of coming on in the 58th minute Rickie Lambert scored a header from a Nathaniel Clyne cross to bring Southampton back into the game. The team continued the pressure on Chelsea, and eventually scored a second when Luke Shaw crossed for Jason Puncheon to volley into the top corner, and the side held on to take a point from the match and move one away from Newcastle below them.

Everton (21 January 2013)

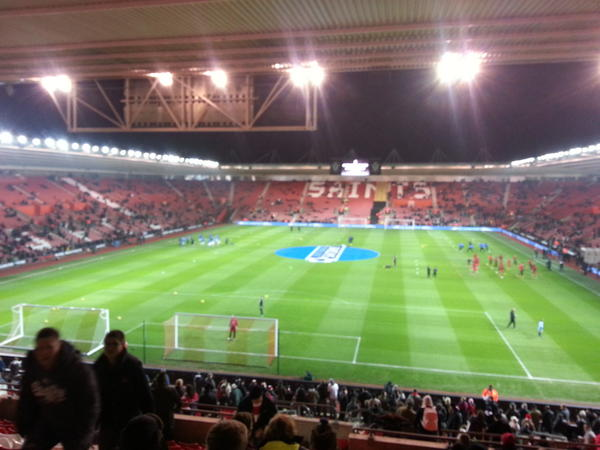
Southampton's home game against Everton was the first with Mauricio Pochettino in charge.

The following Monday, Southampton hosted 5th-placed Everton in the return leg of their 3–1 loss at Goodison Park, for the first match with manager Mauricio Pochettino in charge. The Saints started positively from the beginning of the game, creating numerous chances for the returning Rickie Lambert with Gastón Ramírez, having recently returned from injury, also taking part in many attacking moves early on. In the 20th minute Lambert hit the crossbar with a free kick, and later in the first half had a headed effort cleared off the line by striker Nikica Jelavić. In the second half the visitors enjoyed more of the action, with midfielder Marouane Fellaini coming close twice early after the break. Artur Boruc made a number of key saves later in the game, and despite having a high number of corners Southampton could not break the deadlock and the match ended 0–0.

Manchester United (30 January 2013)

After a break for the FA Cup fourth round matches, during which time the squad travelled to Barcelona for training, Southampton travelled to Old Trafford to face league leaders Manchester United on 30 January 2013. The game started positively for the visitors, as Jay Rodriguez scored after just two minutes following a poor pass back by Michael Carrick to goalkeeper David de Gea. Just six minutes later, however, Wayne Rooney equalised, and Shinji Kagawa almost made it two in the tenth minute when he hit the post. In the 27th minute, Rooney scored the second for the home side as he tapped in a header by Patrice Evra from a Robin van Persie free kick awarded for a foul on Phil Jones by Rodriguez. In the second half, Van Persie came close to a headed goal but for an impressive Artur Boruc save, and he also had a goal disallowed for offside. Despite the majority of the possession in the second half, the Saints were unable to make any of their chances count, and suffered their first league defeat since 22 December 2012 to remain 16th in the table.

Wigan Athletic (2 February 2013)

On 2 February Southampton travelled to the DW Stadium to face fellow relegation possibilities Wigan Athletic, who earlier in the season had beaten the Saints 2–0. The early minutes of the game were noticeably scrappy, with both sides fighting for possession in the middle of the field, and it was Wigan who had the first chance when an early effort from Franco Di Santo was saved by Artur Boruc, before Gastón Ramírez volleyed over the bar from inside the penalty area at the other end. The home side broke the deadlock later on in the half, when captain Gary Caldwell headed in a corner to put his side one up going into the break. In the second half the Saints largely outplayed the hosts, and eventually on-form striker Rickie Lambert equalised when he headed in Jay Rodriguez's knock-on from Jack Cork's cross in the 64th minute. Substitute Adam Lallana then hit the post, and Lambert saw a volley trickle wide, before Morgan Schneiderlin scored in the last ten minutes to all but seal the victory for Southampton. In the last minute of normal time, however, Gary Maloney touched the ball into Southampton's goal to share the spoils between the teams.

Manchester City (9 February 2013)

Back at St Mary's the following week, the Saints hosted current champions Manchester City in the return game of the opening match of the season. The game began relatively quickly, and within seven minutes the hosts had scored as Jason Puncheon took advantage of a mistake by Gareth Barry to cross in for Jay Rodriguez; the effort was saved, but Puncheon followed it up from the edge of the area to put Southampton 1–0 up. The home side continued the pressure on the visitors, and in the 22nd minute Steven Davis made it two when Joe Hart failed to catch a shot from Rickie Lambert with the midfielder running into the box for the tap-in. Rodriguez almost scored a third for Southampton, volleying narrowly wide, but City replied before the break with a counter-attack goal from Edin Džeko set up by Pablo Zabaleta. The half ended with a strong penalty call for Southampton, and after the break the Saints continued to play for a third goal; it came quickly, as Barry's bad fortunes continued when he turned Lambert's cross into his own net despite very little pressure on the ball to make it 3–1 to the 16th-placed side. Despite a change in personnel and tactics, City were unable to get back into the game in a meaningful way, giving Southampton their first win since 12 January to move up to 15th.

Newcastle United (24 February 2013)

After another break, Southampton travelled to face fellow strugglers Newcastle United on 24 February. The game started well for the Saints, as Morgan Schneiderlin opened the scoring within three minutes with a half volley into the bottom corner from a Rickie Lambert cross knockdown. The hosts quickly increased the pace of their play though, and after several chances they scored half an hour later when Moussa Sissoko converted a saved Yoan Gouffran chance to equalise. Just before half time they made it two, as Papiss Cissé scored a long range goal to put Newcastle 2–1 up going into the break. Southampton came out dominating in the second period, with Lambert picking up his 100th goal for the club when he turned in an Adam Lallana cross from the right wing. Danny Fox and Gastón Ramírez came on for Luke Shaw and Steven Davis later on, and it was the defender who gave away a penalty for handball which was converted by Yohan Cabaye in the 67th minute. The Saints attempted to get back into the match, but the result was confirmed when an attempted clearance by Fox went into his own net off Jos Hooiveld, meaning the team dropped from 15th to 16th in the table.

=== March–May 2013 ===
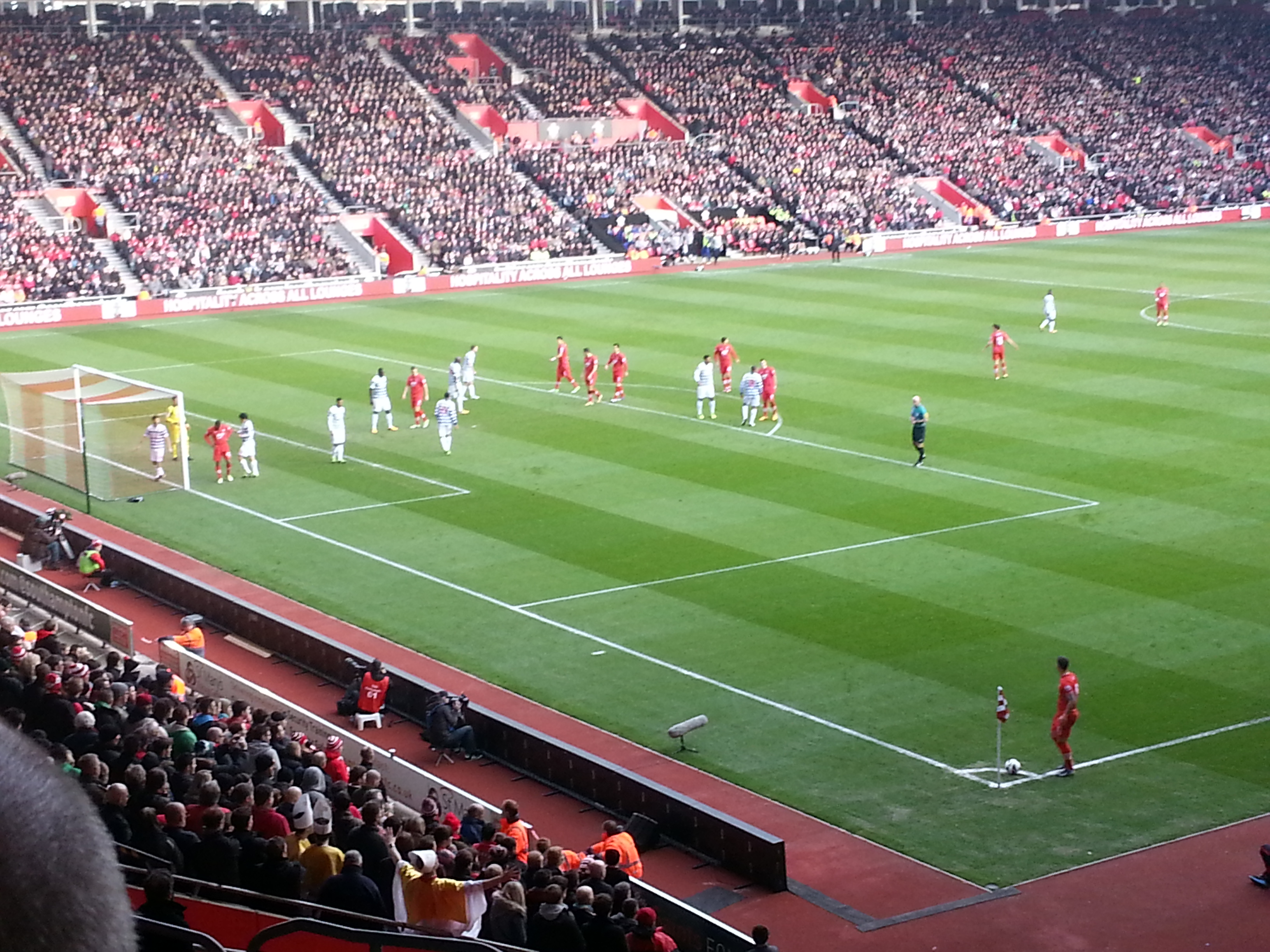
Southampton's loss to Queens Park Rangers in March was their second in a row.

Queens Park Rangers (2 March 2013)

On 2 March, Southampton hosted bottom-placed Queens Park Rangers, in a match which saw competing managers Mauricio Pochettino and former Saints manager Harry Redknapp share their birthday. Southampton got off to a strong start, enjoying the majority of chances for the opening minutes, but it was QPR who broke the deadlock with their first shot on goal in the 14th minute courtesy of a Loïc Rémy strike. A scrappy first half continued on, with the home side unable to equalise until the very end of the first period when QPR goalkeeper Júlio César parried a shot from substitute Jay Rodriguez into the path of Gastón Ramírez, who chipped the ball into the net for 1–1. The second period started equally scrappily, with the hosts pulling out in front early on when both José Fonte and Rodriguez came close to putting the Saints ahead in the opening action. Shaky defending from substitute left-back Luke Shaw and centre-back Maya Yoshida led to the visitors' second (and winning) goal, when Park Ji-sung crossed the ball in for a Jay Bothroyd tap-in past Artur Boruc. Robert Green replaced the injured Júlio César late on, and the move came good when he made an athletic save to deny Yoshida in the last few minutes, giving QPR only their third win of the season and leaving Saints in the relegation mix.

Norwich City (9 March 2013)

The following week Southampton travelled to Carrow Road to play Norwich City. Southampton were arguably the more likely to score early on in the game, with attacking players Adam Lallana, Gastón Ramírez, Jay Rodriguez and Rickie Lambert all enjoying first-half chances, and City goalkeeper Mark Bunn played his part in denying the visitors. Robert Snodgrass, Grant Holt and Michael Turner all had chances for the hosts, but it was the final minute in which the game really took shape – Southampton defender Luke Shaw was penalised for a challenge on Norwich striker Grant Holt, and City were awarded a controversial penalty. Ultimately Artur Boruc saved the penalty, meaning the points were shared between the teams, although due to the reaction by their players after the penalty decision Southampton were fined by The Football Association for "failing to control their players".

Liverpool (16 March 2013)

On 16 March Southampton hosted Liverpool, and after a shaky start the home side went ahead through Morgan Schneiderlin's fifth goal of the season, converting a Gastón Ramírez cross headed down into the penalty area by Jay Rodriguez. The Saints dominated most of the first half, with chances for more goals falling to Adam Lallana, Rickie Lambert and Rodriguez within the opening 20 minutes of play; Lambert eventually did put his side 2–0 up, with a free kick deflecting off the Liverpool wall to beat Brad Jones. Former Southampton target Philippe Coutinho was the main threat from the visiting side, and after being denied by Artur Boruc in the 40th minute he brought his side back into the game on the stroke of half time. The second half was much more scrappy, with Liverpool edging Saints out and forcing them into defensive errors, but late on in the game it was Rodriguez who scored the fourth and final goal of the game, running almost half the pitch and converting a deflection off Jones to win the game for Southampton in front of a season record attendance of 32,070.

Chelsea (30 March 2013)

Following the final two-week international break, Southampton returned to St Mary's on 30 March to face Chelsea for the third time in the season, ahead of the visitors' FA Cup replay just two days later. Despite a number of key injuries, including captain Adam Lallana and playmaker Gastón Ramírez, Southampton started the game at a high tempo, with Jay Rodriguez coming close early on after a long run through the Chelsea defence. Rodriguez eventually did open the scoring for the hosts in the 23rd minute, linking up well with Steven Davis to slot calmly past Petr Čech to put the Saints ahead. Ten minutes later John Terry equalised with a header from a corner, although the hope for the visiting side did not last long as a Rickie Lambert free kick on his 500th career league appearance just two minutes later put the home side back in the lead going into half time. Goalkeeper Artur Boruc was taken off at the break and replaced by Kelvin Davis, who later made a number of key saves to deny Chelsea from coming back into the match. Despite high pressure from the visitors towards the end of the game, Southampton held on and moved up to 12th in the table following Everton's win later in the day.

Reading (6 April 2013)

After two wins in a row, and the club in 12th place in the Premier League, Southampton travelled to face Championship title holders Reading, in a game which saw the Saints face old manager Nigel Adkins for the first time since his sacking. The game started badly for the travelling side, who defended poorly to almost allow Adam Le Fondre to open the scoring, although it was Southampton who broke the deadlock through Jay Rodriguez's sixth league goal of the season, and his third in three consecutive games. Southampton continued pressuring the home side throughout the rest of the first half, with Rodriguez coming close to netting a second but hitting the bar and Gastón Ramírez missing an opportunity. After the break the visitors came out stronger, although many chances were missed and the hosts began to take the advantage; Adam Lallana replaced Ramírez in the 63rd minute though, and within ten minutes had scored Southampton's second. A controversial Artur Boruc save denied Reading a consolation, and despite added pressure Southampton held on to record a third consecutive victory in the top flight for the first time since December 2003, and move up to 11th.

West Ham United (13 April 2013)

With the club in 11th place in the league table, Southampton hosted West Ham United just a position below them on equal points on 13 April. The game was a largely scrappy affair in difficult weather conditions, and both the home side and the away side enjoyed early chances – a shot by Rickie Lambert from a corner was deflected onto the post by United goalkeeper Jussi Jääskeläinen, and winger Ricardo Vaz Tê was denied by the crossbar. Just before the hour mark, however, the Saints finally broke the deadlock when Gastón Ramírez found himself free of the West Ham defence and, on the second attempt, slotted the ball into the visitors' net. The lead was sacrificed just seven minutes later, as a Jos Hooiveld-conceded free kick was scored scrappily by Andy Carroll to put the Hammers in with a chance of points. Jay Rodriguez and Jason Puncheon were introduced later in the match, which helped the home side, but it was not enough to overcome a resilient West Ham side and obtain all three points.

Swansea City (20 April 2013)

The following week Southampton travelled to face Swansea City, still in the top half of the table. The hosts started the stronger of the two sides, with Àngel Rangel and Jonathan de Guzmán coming close early on, with Jack Cork and Jay Rodriguez responding for the visiting Saints and forcing saves from Swansea goalkeeper Michel Vorm. Rickie Lambert came close to scoring with a free kick, and from the resulting corner Adam Lallana converted into the Swansea net but the goal was disallowed for a foul on Vorm by the Southampton captain. Both sides enjoyed decent chances throughout the second half, and substitute Emmanuel Mayuka came close to winning it in the closing minutes but for a reflex save from in-form Vorm; the game ended goalless, extending Southampton's unbeaten run to six matches.

West Bromwich Albion (27 April 2013)

On 27 April Southampton hosted a West Brom side which had not won since 9 March. The game started relatively well for the home side, who dominated possession and had chances to score first within the opening few exchanges, but it was the visitors who opened against the run of play in the sixth minute when Marc-Antoine Fortuné turned in a corner on the third attempt to give the Baggies an early advantage. For Southampton the standout player was Jay Rodriguez, who took a number of opportunities to shoot but only hit the target a few times, although West Brom had their fair share of chances too (many involving Chelsea loanee Romelu Lukaku) in a largely cagey and scrappy opening 45 minutes. Gastón Ramírez came on at half time and was involved in a few early attacks for the hosts, but 25 minutes into the second half (after Lukaku had taken advantage of defensive errors to double his team's lead) he was sent off for an incident involving Fortuné following an alleged elbow on Shane Long, which also saw the West Brom goalscorer dismissed. Long later scored a third for the visitors, before referee Robert Madley – in charge of his first game in the Premier League – gave Danny Fox his second booking of the game and Southampton's second red card of the game (and of the season) to leave them with nine-men for the last ten minutes; due to other results, Southampton only dropped one place in the league table.

Tottenham Hotspur (4 May 2013)

The following week Southampton travelled to White Hart Lane to face European hopefuls Tottenham Hotspur. With kick-off delayed by half an hour due to an issue on the local motorway, the travelling side took the early initiative with Rickie Lambert coming close after latching onto a lofted ball by Nathaniel Clyne; Lambert came close again minutes later, as he saw a close-range free kick pushed by Hugo Lloris onto the post, and Steven Davis could not convert the follow-up. After the break the Saints continued to enjoy the majority of scoring opportunities, with a notable chance for Adam Lallana going astray, followed by a period of dominance for the hosts in which Clint Dempsey and Tom Huddlestone came close. In the final five minutes though, recently named PFA Players' Player of the Year and PFA Young Player of the Year and former Southampton player Gareth Bale scored his second in two against his old club when he broke away from Luke Shaw and fired a shot into the top corner of Southampton's net, subjecting them to a second defeat in a row.

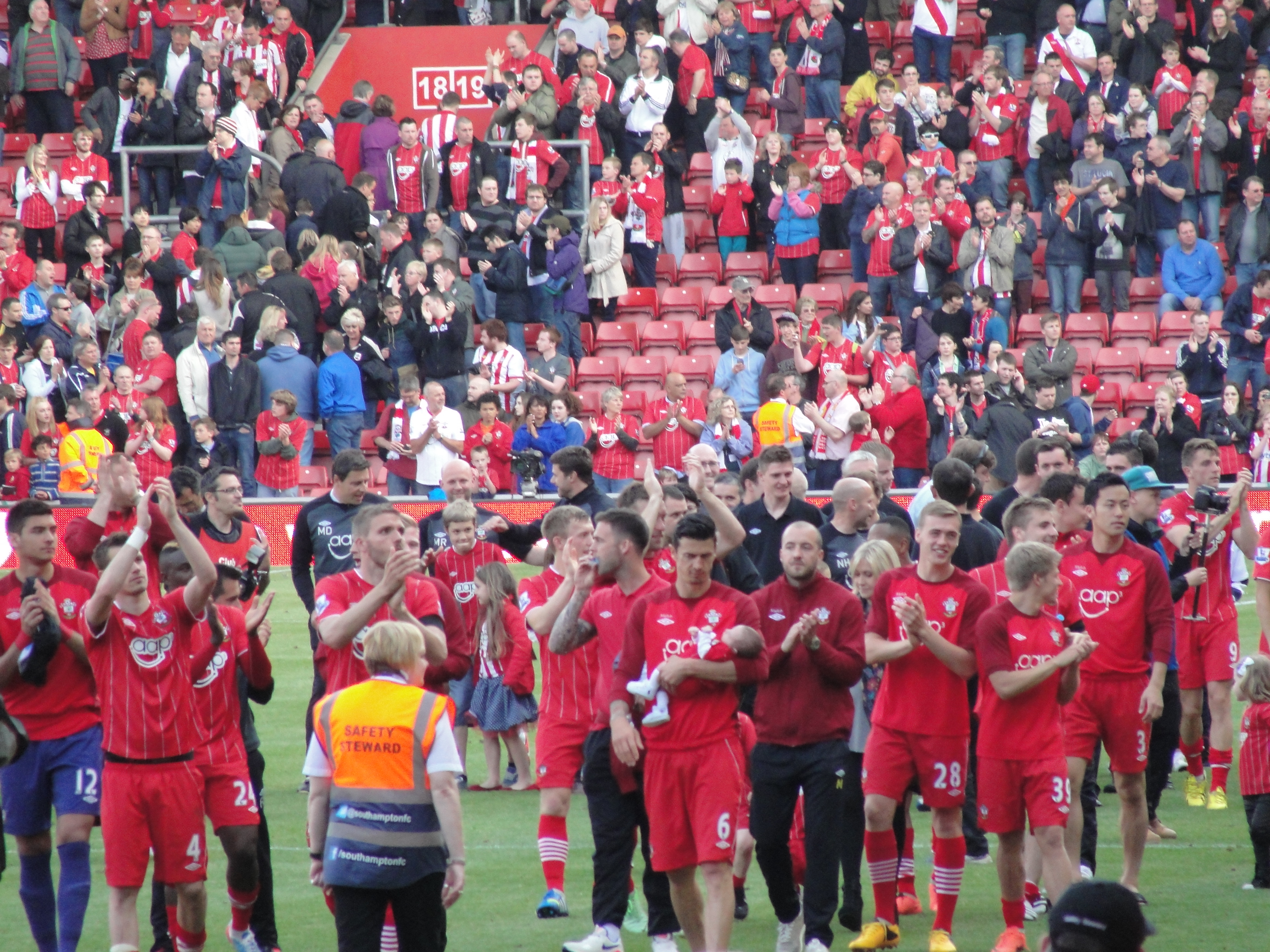
After their final game of the season, against Stoke City, the Southampton players completed a lap of honour at St Mary's Stadium to thank the fans for their support throughout the year.

Sunderland (12 May 2013)

Southampton travelled to the Stadium of Light for their penultimate game of the season, facing a Sunderland side just one point and one place below them in the bottom quadrant of the league table. Once again the Saints dominated early possession and chances, although they lacked an end product with Rickie Lambert often found offside and surrounding players in poor form in the opposition half; it took until 27 minute for Sunderland to have the first actual chance of the game, which ended with a harmless shot at Artur Boruc. Into the second half the game continued on level terms, with Sunderland goalkeeper Simon Mignolet performing well against the attacks of the visitors, and it was the home side who took advantage on 68 minutes when full-back Phil Bardsley made a run into the Southampton half and drove a shot in from outside the box. The Saints responded quickly however, as both substitute midfielders James Ward-Prowse and Jason Puncheon linked up well to equalise for Pochettino's side eight minutes later. Lambert had a chance to win it for the visitors, but in the end the game finished 1–1 which meant Southampton were almost entirely safe in the Premier League, but for an unlikely run of results in the final matches of the season.

Stoke City (19 May 2013)

Southampton's final game of the season was at home to Stoke City, which was also the final career match of striker Michael Owen. The home side began the game strongly, with season top scorer Rickie Lambert scoring within the first minute only for the goal to be disallowed for offside. The remainder of the first half saw few chances for either side, but it was Stoke who struck first after the break when former Saints striker Peter Crouch headed in a cross from Geoff Cameron to put the Potters one up. In response, Steven Davis and Morgan Schneiderlin came close to scoring an equaliser but for the performance of Asmir Begović in goal, and ten minutes after the opener Lambert made it 15 for the season with a tap-in from close range. The scores remained level and it left Southampton in 14th place for their first season back in the Premier League.

=== Results and table ===
19 August 2012 1	Manchester City	3–2	Southampton	Manchester
16:00 BST	Tevez 39'; Džeko 71'; Nasri 80'	Report	Lambert 60'; Davis 67'	Stadium: Etihad Stadium; Attendance: 46,409; Referee: Howard Webb

25 August 2012 2	Southampton	0–2	Wigan Athletic	Southampton
15:00 BST		Report	Di Santo 51'; Koné 89'	Stadium: St Mary's Stadium; Attendance: 29,604; Referee: Anthony Taylor

2 September 2012 3	Southampton	2–3	Manchester United	Southampton
16:00 BST	Lambert 17'; Schneiderlin 56'; Hooiveld	Report	Van Persie 23', 87', 90+1'	Stadium: St Mary's Stadium; Attendance: 31,609; Referee: Mike Dean

15 September 2012 4	Arsenal	6–1	Southampton	London
15:00 BST	Hooiveld 11' (o.g.); Podolski 31'; Gervinho 35', 71'; Clyne 37' (o.g.); Walcott 88'	Report	Fox 45'	Stadium: Emirates Stadium; Attendance: 60,097; Referee: Kevin Friend

22 September 2012 5	Southampton	4–1	Aston Villa	Southampton
15:00 BST	Lambert 58', 90+4' (pen.); Clyne 63'; Puncheon 72'	Report	Bent 36'	Stadium: St Mary's Stadium; Attendance: 30,713; Referee: Jonathan Moss

29 September 2012 6	Everton	3–1	Southampton	Liverpool
15:00 BST	Osman 25'; Jelavić 32', 38'	Report	Ramírez 6'	Stadium: Goodison Park; Attendance: 37,922; Referee: Lee Probert

7 October 2012 7	Southampton	2–2	Fulham	Southampton
13:30 BST	Fonte 4', 90'	Report	Hooiveld 69' (o.g.); Richardson 88'	Stadium: St Mary's Stadium; Attendance: 28,004; Referee: Mark Clattenburg

20 October 2012 8	West Ham United	4–1	Southampton	London
15:00 BST	Noble 46', 72' (pen.); Nolan 48'; Maïga 87'	Report	Lallana 63'	Stadium: Boleyn Ground; Attendance: 34,925; Referee: Neil Swarbrick

28 October 2012 9	Southampton	1–2	Tottenham Hotspur	Southampton
15:00 GMT	Rodriguez 66'	Report	Bale 15'; Dempsey 39'	Stadium: St Mary's Stadium; Attendance: 31,944; Referee: Lee Mason

5 November 2012 10	West Bromwich Albion	2–0	Southampton	West Bromwich
20:00 GMT	Odemwingie 36', 60'	Report		Stadium: The Hawthorns; Attendance: 25,635; Referee: Mark Halsey

10 November 2012 11	Southampton	1–1	Swansea City	Southampton
15:00 GMT	Schneiderlin 64'	Report	Dyer 73'	Stadium: St Mary's Stadium; Attendance: 30,501; Referee: Andre Marriner

17 November 2012 12	Queens Park Rangers	1–3	Southampton	London
15:00 GMT	Hoilett 49'	Report	Lambert 23'; Puncheon 45+1'; Ferdinand 83' (o.g.)	Stadium: Loftus Road; Attendance: 18,174; Referee: Mike Dean

25 November 2012 13	Southampton	2–0	Newcastle United	Southampton
15:00 GMT	Lallana 35'; Ramírez 60'	Report		Stadium: St Mary's Stadium; Attendance: 31,410; Referee: Martin Atkinson

28 November 2012 14	Southampton	1–1	Norwich City	Southampton
19:45 GMT	Lambert 32'	Report	Snodgrass 45'	Stadium: St Mary's Stadium; Attendance: 29,325; Referee: Mark Clattenburg

1 December 2012 15	Liverpool	1–0	Southampton	Liverpool
15:00 GMT	Agger 43'	Report		Stadium: Anfield; Attendance: 44,525; Referee: Michael Oliver

8 December 2012 16	Southampton	1–0	Reading	Southampton
15:00 GMT	Puncheon 61'	Report		Stadium: St Mary's Stadium; Attendance: 29,331; Referee: Jonathan Moss

22 December 2012 17	Southampton	0–1	Sunderland	Southampton
15:00 GMT		Report	Fletcher 42'	Stadium: St Mary's Stadium; Attendance: 31,275; Referee: Howard Webb

26 December 2012 18	Fulham	1–1	Southampton	London
15:00 GMT	Berbatov 8'	Report	Lambert 85' (pen.)	Stadium: Craven Cottage; Attendance: 25,700; Referee: Phil Dowd

29 December 2012 19	Stoke City	3–3	Southampton	Stoke-on-Trent
15:00 GMT	Jones 16'; Upson 67'; Jerome 90'	Report	Lambert 10'; Rodriguez 24'; Wilkinson 36' (o.g.)	Stadium: Britannia Stadium; Attendance: 26,391; Referee: Mark Clattenburg

1 January 2013 20	Southampton	1–1	Arsenal	Southampton
17:30 GMT	Ramírez 35'	Report	Do Prado 41' (o.g.)	Stadium: St Mary's Stadium; Attendance: 31,743; Referee: Lee Probert

12 January 2013 21	Aston Villa	0–1	Southampton	Birmingham
15:00 GMT		Report	Lambert 34' (pen.)	Stadium: Villa Park; Attendance: 32,500; Referee: Mark Halsey

16 January 2013 22	Chelsea	2–2	Southampton	London
19:45 GMT	Ba 25'; Hazard 45'	Report	Lambert 58'; Puncheon 75'	Stadium: Stamford Bridge; Attendance: 38,484; Referee: Michael Oliver

21 January 2013 23	Southampton	0–0	Everton	Southampton
20:00 GMT		Report		Stadium: St Mary's Stadium; Attendance: 28,359; Referee: Neil Swarbrick

30 January 2013 24	Manchester United	2–1	Southampton	Manchester
20:00 GMT	Rooney 8', 27'	Report	Rodriguez 3'	Stadium: Old Trafford; Attendance: 75,600; Referee: Lee Mason

2 February 2013 25	Wigan Athletic	2–2	Southampton	Wigan
15:00 GMT	Caldwell 25'; Maloney 90'	Report	Lambert 64'; Schneiderlin 86'	Stadium: DW Stadium; Attendance: 18,598; Referee: Andre Marriner

9 February 2013 26	Southampton	3–1	Manchester City	Southampton
17:30 GMT	Puncheon 7'; Davis 22'; Barry 48' (o.g.)	Report	Džeko 39'	Stadium: St Mary's Stadium; Attendance: 31,798; Referee: Martin Atkinson

24 February 2013 27	Newcastle United	4–2	Southampton	Newcastle
13:30 GMT	Sissoko 33'; Cissé 42'; Cabaye 67' (pen.); Hooiveld 79' (o.g.)	Report	Schneiderlin 3'; Lambert 50'	Stadium: St James' Park; Attendance: 52,259; Referee: Chris Foy

2 March 2013 28	Southampton	1–2	Queens Park Rangers	Southampton
15:00 GMT	Ramírez 45'	Report	Rémy 14'; Bothroyd 77'	Stadium: St Mary's Stadium; Attendance: 31,728; Referee: Howard Webb

9 March 2013 29	Norwich City	0–0	Southampton	Norwich
15:00 GMT		Report		Stadium: Carrow Road; Attendance: 26,783; Referee: Mark Clattenburg

16 March 2013 30	Southampton	3–1	Liverpool	Southampton
15:00 GMT	Schneiderlin 6'; Lambert 33'; Rodriguez 81'	Report	Coutinho 45+1'	Stadium: St Mary's Stadium; Attendance: 32,070; Referee: Phil Dowd

30 March 2013 31	Southampton	2–1	Chelsea	Southampton
15:00 GMT	Rodriguez 23'; Lambert 35'	Report	Terry 33'	Stadium: St Mary's Stadium; Attendance: 31,779; Referee: Jonathan Moss

6 April 2013 32	Reading	0–2	Southampton	Reading
12:45 BST		Report	Rodriguez 34'; Lallana 72'	Stadium: Madejski Stadium; Attendance: 24,108; Referee: Mike Jones

13 April 2013 33	Southampton	1–1	West Ham United	Southampton
15:00 BST	Ramírez 59'	Report	Carroll 66'	Stadium: St Mary's Stadium; Attendance: 31,984; Referee: Mike Dean

20 April 2013 34	Swansea City	0–0	Southampton	Swansea
15:00 BST		Report		Stadium: Liberty Stadium; Attendance: 20,561; Referee: Mark Halsey

27 April 2013 35	Southampton	0–3	West Bromwich Albion	Southampton
15:00 BST		Report	Fortuné 6'; Lukaku 67'; Long 77'	Stadium: St Mary's Stadium; Attendance: 31,946; Referee: Robert Madley

4 May 2013 36	Tottenham Hotspur	1–0	Southampton	London
15:30 BST	Bale 86'	Report		Stadium: White Hart Lane; Attendance: 36,190; Referee: Mark Clattenburg

12 May 2013 37	Sunderland	1–1	Southampton	Sunderland
15:00 BST	Bardsley 68'	Report	Puncheon 76'	Stadium: Stadium of Light; Attendance: 41,988; Referee: Mike Dean

19 May 2013 38	Southampton	1–1	Stoke City	Southampton
16:00 BST	Lambert 57'	Report	Crouch 47'	Stadium: St Mary's Stadium; Attendance: 31,539; Referee: Lee Probert

Round	1	2	3	4	5	6	7	8	9	10	11	12	13	14	15	16	17	18	19	20	21	22	23	24	25	26	27	28	29	30	31	32	33	34	35	36	37	38
Ground	A	H	H	A	H	A	H	A	H	A	H	A	H	H	A	H	H	A	A	H	A	A	H	A	A	H	A	H	A	H	H	A	H	A	H	A	A	H
Result	L	L	L	L	W	L	D	L	L	L	D	W	W	D	L	W	L	D	D	D	W	D	D	L	D	W	L	L	D	W	W	W	D	D	L	L	D	D
Position	14	18	20	20	17	17	17	18	19	20	19	19	17	18	18	15	17	17	18	17	15	15	15	16	16	15	16	16	16	15	12	11	11	12	13	14	14	14

Updated to match(es) played on 19 May 2013. Source: statto.com
A = Away; H = Home; W = Win; D = Draw; L = Loss

Pos	Club	Pld	W	D	L	GF	GA	GD	Pts
12	Fulham	38	11	10	17	50	60	–10	43
13	Stoke City	38	9	15	14	34	45	–11	42
14	Southampton	38	9	14	15	49	60	–11	41
15	Aston Villa	38	10	11	17	47	69	–22	41
16	Newcastle United	38	11	8	19	45	68	–23	41

Pld = Matches played; W = Matches won; D = Matches drawn; L = Matches lost; GF = Goals for; GA = Goals against; GD = Goal difference; Pts = Points

== FA Cup ==
On 5 January 2013, Southampton hosted FA Cup holders Chelsea in the Third Round of the tournament. The Saints started strongly in the first half, breaking the deadlock in the 22nd minute courtesy of a Jay Rodriguez strike set up by Jason Puncheon, but could not hold the lead until the break as Chelsea striker Demba Ba scored on his debut just over ten minutes later, before Victor Moses scored the away side's second on the stroke of half time. Shortly after the break the hosts conceded again when Branislav Ivanović headed in a Juan Mata cross, and Ba made it 4–1 for the reigning champions on the hour mark. In the last ten minutes Chelsea were awarded a penalty for a handball by Steven Davis, and substitute captain Frank Lampard converted confidently to seal a 5–1 win at St Mary's, knocking Southampton out of the competition.

5 January 2013 Round 3	Southampton	1–5	Chelsea	Southampton
15:00 GMT	Rodriguez 22'	Report	Ba 35', 61'; Moses 45+1'; Ivanović 52'; Lampard 83' (pen.)	Stadium: St Mary's Stadium; Attendance: 27,813; Referee: Mike Dean

== League Cup ==
Stevenage (28 August 2012)

On 28 August 2012, Southampton travelled to play Stevenage in the second round of the 2012–13 Football League Cup. After a relatively even and incident-free first half, the Saints came out firing after the break as returning striker Tadanari Lee scored his first goal of the season to put the visitors one up. Billy Sharp, who provided the assist for the first goal, got on the scoresheet himself 20 minutes later with Southampton's second, before winger Jason Puncheon scored a third two minutes later from outside the penalty area. Among a number of young players coming on as substitutes late in the game, Ben Reeves scored on his season debut in the third minute of injury time to seal the win for the Saints, with the home side picking up a consolation goal to leave the score at 4–1.

Sheffield Wednesday (25 September 2012)

Southampton's third round draw saw the club host Championship side Sheffield Wednesday on 25 September. After half an hour of pressure from both sides, Jay Rodriguez scored his first goal for the Saints with a shot from the edge of the penalty area to put the hosts ahead. Following a number of additional chances for Southampton to go two up, the sides went into half time at 1–0. Despite a number of clear cut chances in the second half, it took until the 78th minute for Rodriguez to double Southampton's lead when he converted a penalty following a foul on winger Steve De Ridder. Wednesday increased the pressure in the final part of the match, but were unable to reverse Southampton's win.

Leeds United (30 October 2012)

For the fourth round of the cup, Southampton were drawn in an away match against Championship side Leeds United for 30 October. The home side held the majority of the possession and enjoyed more chances than the visitors in the first half, and opened the scoring in the 34th minute courtesy of loanee midfielder Michael Tonge. The second half continued in much the same way, with Leeds boasting more of the few chances, before El Hadji Diouf finally secured the victory for the hosts with an 88th-minute goal. In the last minute Leeds were also awarded a penalty, which was scored by substitute striker Luciano Becchio.

28 August 2012 Round 2	Stevenage	1–4	Southampton	Stevenage
19:45 BST	Thalassitis 90+2'	Report	Lee 53'; Sharp 74'; Puncheon 76'; Reeves 90+3'	Stadium: Broadhall Way; Attendance: 3,062; Referee: Oliver Langford

25 September 2012 Round 3	Southampton	2–0	Sheffield Wednesday	Southampton
19:45 BST	Rodriguez 30', 78' (pen.)	Report		Stadium: St Mary's Stadium; Attendance: 9,890; Referee: Mark Halsey

30 October 2012 Round 4	Leeds United	3–0	Southampton	Leeds
19:45 GMT	Tonge 34'; Diouf 88'; Becchio 90+3' (pen.)	Report		Stadium: Elland Road; Attendance: 17,002; Referee: Chris Foy

== Squad statistics ==
No.	Pos.	Nat.	Name	League			FA Cup			League Cup			Total			Discipline	
No.	Pos.	Nat.	Name	Apps.	Gls.	Asst.	Apps.	Gls.	Asst.	Apps.	Gls.	Asst.	Apps.	Gls.	Asst.	Yellow card	Red card
1	GK	(England)	Kelvin Davis	9(1)	0	0	0	0	0	1	0	0	10(1)	0	0	0	0
2	DF	(England)	Nathaniel Clyne	34	1	3	0	0	0	0	0	0	34	1	3	2	0
3	DF	(Japan)	Maya Yoshida	31(1)	0	0	1	0	0	1	0	0	33(1)	0	0	2	0
4	MF	(France)	Morgan Schneiderlin	36	5	1	1	0	0	0	0	0	37	5	1	9	0
5	DF	(Netherlands)	Jos Hooiveld	23(2)	0	0	0(1)	0	0	2	0	0	25(3)	0	0	5	0
6	DF	(Portugal)	José Fonte	25(2)	2	1	1	0	0	0	0	0	26(2)	2	1	5	0
7	FW	(England)	Rickie Lambert	35(3)	15	9	0	0	0	0	0	0	35(3)	15	9	2	0
8	MF	(Northern Ireland)	Steven Davis	22(10)	2	2	1	0	0	0	0	0	23(10)	2	2	1	0
9	FW	(England)	Jay Rodriguez	24(11)	6	8	1	1	0	1	2	0	26(11)	9	8	4	0
10	MF	(Uruguay)	Gastón Ramírez	20(6)	5	2	0	0	0	0	0	0	20(6)	5	2	2	1
12	GK	(Argentina)	Paulo Gazzaniga	9	0	0	0	0	0	2	0	0	11	0	0	0	0
13	DF	(Scotland)	Danny Fox	14(6)	1	1	0	0	0	0	0	0	14(6)	1	1	3	1
15	DF	(Norway)	Vegard Forren	0	0	0	0	0	0	0	0	0	0	0	0	0	0
16	MF	(England)	James Ward-Prowse	4(11)	0	1	1	0	0	3	0	0	8(11)	0	1	1	0
18	MF	(England)	Jack Cork	28	0	0	1	0	0	1	0	0	30	0	0	1	0
20	MF	(England)	Adam Lallana	26(4)	3	6	0	0	0	0	0	0	26(4)	3	6	2	0
21	MF	(Brazil)	Guilherme do Prado	8(10)	0	2	1	0	0	2	0	0	11(10)	0	2	0	0
22	DF	(England)	Frazer Richardson	2(3)	0	0	0	0	0	2	0	0	4(3)	0	0	0	0
23	DF	(England)	Luke Shaw	22(3)	0	1	1	0	0	1(1)	0	0	24(4)	0	1	2	0
24	FW	(Zambia)	Emmanuel Mayuka	1(10)	0	1	0	0	0	1	0	0	2(10)	0	1	0	0
26	DF	(England)	Jack Stephens	0	0	0	0	0	0	0	0	0	0	0	0	0	0
27	MF	(England)	Richard Chaplow	0(3)	0	0	0	0	0	3	0	1	3(3)	0	1	0	0
28	MF	(England)	Calum Chambers	0	0	0	0	0	0	0(1)	0	1	0(1)	0	1	0	0
30	GK	(United States)	Cody Cropper	0	0	0	0	0	0	0	0	0	0	0	0	0	0
31	GK	(Poland)	Artur Boruc	20	0	0	1	0	0	0	0	0	21	0	0	1	0
33	MF	(Belgium)	Steve De Ridder	0(4)	0	0	0(1)	0	0	2	0	1	2(5)	0	1	2	0
34	MF	(England)	Corby Moore	0	0	0	0	0	0	0	0	0	0	0	0	0	0
36	FW	(England)	Jake Sinclair	0	0	0	0	0	0	0	0	0	0	0	0	0	0
37	MF	(England)	Dominic Gape	0	0	0	0	0	0	0	0	0	0	0	0	0	0
38	MF	(England)	Andy Robinson	0	0	0	0	0	0	0(1)	0	0	0(1)	0	0	0	0
39	MF	(Wales)	Lloyd Isgrove	0	0	0	0	0	0	0(1)	0	0	0(1)	0	0	0	0
42	MF	(England)	Jason Puncheon	25(7)	6	4	1	0	1	1	1	0	27(7)	7	5	1	0
Players with appearances who ended the season on loan
11	FW	(England)	Billy Sharp	0(2)	0	0	0	0	0	1	1	1	1(2)	1	1	0	0
14	MF	(England)	Dean Hammond	0	0	0	0	0	0	1	0	0	1	0	0	0	0
19	FW	(Japan)	Tadanari Lee	0	0	0	0(1)	0	0	2	1	0	2(1)	1	0	0	0
25	DF	(England)	Danny Seaborne	0	0	0	0	0	0	3	0	0	3	0	0	1	0
29	MF	(Northern Ireland)	Ben Reeves	0(3)	0	0	0	0	0	1(2)	1	0	1(5)	1	0	1	0
32	DF	(England)	Danny Butterfield	0	0	0	0	0	0	2	0	0	2	0	0	0	0
35	FW	(England)	Sam Hoskins	0	0	0	0	0	0	0(2)	0	0	0(2)	0	0	0	0

=== Most appearances ===
	Pos.	Nat.	Name	League		FA Cup		League Cup		Total		
	Pos.	Nat.	Name	Strt.	Sub.	Strt.	Sub.	Strt.	Sub.	Strt.	Sub.	Total
1	FW	(England)	Rickie Lambert	35	3	0	0	0	0	35	3	38
2	MF	(France)	Morgan Schneiderlin	36	0	1	0	0	0	37	0	37
2	FW	(England)	Jay Rodriguez	24	11	1	0	1	0	26	11	37
4	DF	(England)	Nathaniel Clyne	34	0	0	0	0	0	34	0	34
4	DF	(Japan)	Maya Yoshida	32	1	1	0	1	0	33	1	34
4	MF	(England)	Jason Puncheon	25	7	1	0	1	0	27	7	34
7	MF	(Northern Ireland)	Steven Davis	22	10	1	0	0	0	23	10	33
8	MF	(England)	Jack Cork	28	0	1	0	1	0	30	0	30
8	MF	(England)	Adam Lallana	26	4	0	0	0	0	26	4	30
10	DF	(Portugal)	José Fonte	25	2	1	0	0	0	26	2	28
10	DF	(England)	Luke Shaw	22	3	1	0	1	1	24	4	28

=== Top goalscorers ===
	Pos.	Nat.	Name	League		FA Cup		League Cup		Total		
	Pos.	Nat.	Name	Gls.	Apps.	Gls.	Apps.	Gls.	Apps.	Gls.	Apps.	GPG
1	FW	(England)	Rickie Lambert	15	38	0	0	0	0	15	38	0.39
2	FW	(England)	Jay Rodriguez	6	35	1	1	2	1	9	37	0.24
3	MF	(England)	Jason Puncheon	6	32	0	1	1	1	7	34	0.20
4	MF	(Uruguay)	Gastón Ramírez	5	26	0	0	0	0	5	26	0.19
4	MF	(France)	Morgan Schneiderlin	5	36	0	1	0	0	5	37	0.13
6	MF	(England)	Adam Lallana	3	30	0	0	0	0	3	30	0.10
7	DF	(Portugal)	José Fonte	2	27	0	1	0	0	2	28	0.07
7	MF	(Northern Ireland)	Steven Davis	2	32	0	1	0	0	2	33	0.06
9	FW	(Japan)	Tadanari Lee	0	0	0	1	1	2	1	3	0.33
9	FW	(England)	Billy Sharp	0	2	0	0	1	1	1	3	0.33
9	MF	(Northern Ireland)	Ben Reeves	0	3	0	0	1	3	1	6	0.17
9	DF	(Scotland)	Danny Fox	1	20	0	0	0	0	1	20	0.05
9	DF	(England)	Nathaniel Clyne	1	34	0	0	0	0	1	34	0.02

== Transfers ==
Players transferred in
Date	Pos.	Name	Club	Fee	Ref.
1 July 2012	FW	(England) Jay Rodriguez	(England) Burnley	£7,500,000	
6 July 2012	MF	(Northern Ireland) Steven Davis	(Scotland) Rangers	Undisclosed	
19 July 2012	DF	(England) Nathaniel Clyne	(England) Crystal Palace	Compensation	
20 July 2012	GK	(Argentina) Paulo Gazzaniga	(England) Gillingham	Undisclosed	
28 August 2012	FW	(Zambia) Emmanuel Mayuka	(Switzerland) BSC Young Boys	Undisclosed	
30 August 2012	DF	(Japan) Maya Yoshida	(Netherlands) VVV-Venlo	Undisclosed	
31 August 2012	MF	(Uruguay) Gastón Ramírez	(Italy) Bologna	£12,000,000	
18 January 2013	DF	(Norway) Vegard Forren	(Norway) Molde	Undisclosed	
Free agents signed
Date	Pos.	Name	Former club	Date released	Ref.
31 August 2012	GK	(United States) Cody Cropper	(England) Ipswich Town	1 July 2012	
22 September 2012	GK	(Poland) Artur Boruc	(Italy) Fiorentina	1 July 2012	
Players transferred out
Date	Pos.	Name	Club	Fee	Ref.
29 July 2012	DF	(England) Dan Harding	(England) Nottingham Forest	Undisclosed	
Players loaned out
Start date	Pos.	Name	Club	End date	Ref.
1 July 2012	DF	(England) Aaron Martin	(England) Crystal Palace	4 January 2013	
20 July 2012	GK	(England) Tommy Forecast	(England) Gillingham	End of season	
17 August 2012	FW	(Barbados) Jonathan Forte	(England) Crawley Town	17 November 2012	
18 August 2012	FW	(England) Lee Barnard	(England) Bournemouth	1 January 2013	
31 August 2012	FW	(England) Billy Sharp	(England) Nottingham Forest	End of season	
31 August 2012	FW	(England) Dean Hammond	(England) Brighton & Hove Albion	End of season	
9 November 2012	DF	(England) Danny Seaborne	(England) Charlton Athletic	9 December 2012	
10 November 2012	MF	(Portugal) Alberto Seidi	(England) Aldershot Town	10 December 2012	
3 January 2013	FW	(England) Sam Hoskins	(England) Stevenage	End of season	
11 January 2013	DF	(England) Ryan Dickson	(England) Bradford City	End of season	
17 January 2013	DF	(England) Danny Seaborne	(England) Bournemouth	End of season	
31 January 2013	FW	(Barbados) Jonathan Forte	(England) Sheffield United	End of season	
31 January 2013	MF	(Northern Ireland) Ben Reeves	(England) Southend United	28 February 2013	
31 January 2013	MF	(Belgium) Steve De Ridder	(England) Bolton Wanderers	28 February 2013	
31 January 2013	FW	(England) Lee Barnard	(England) Oldham Athletic	End of season	
14 February 2013	FW	(Japan) Tadanari Lee	(Japan) Tokyo	End of season	
25 February 2013	DF	(England) Aaron Martin	(England) Coventry City	End of season	
15 March 2013	MF	(England) Richard Chaplow	(England) Millwall	9 April 2013	
15 March 2013	MF	(Northern Ireland) Ben Reeves	(England) Southend United	End of season	
27 March 2013	DF	(England) Danny Butterfield	(England) Bolton Wanderers	End of season	
Players released
Date	Pos.	Name	Subsequent club	Join date	Ref.
19 May 2012	DF	(Tunisia) Radhi Jaïdi	None (retirement)		
19 May 2012	DF	(England) Harlee Dean	(England) Brentford	21 May 2012	
19 May 2012	MF	(England) Lee Holmes	(England) Preston North End	29 May 2012	
19 May 2012	GK	(England) Jack Dovey	(England) Eastleigh	31 May 2012	
19 May 2012	GK	(Poland) Bartosz Białkowski	(England) Notts County	15 June 2012	
19 May 2012	FW	(Wales) Ryan Doble	(England) Shrewsbury Town	20 June 2012	
19 May 2012	FW	(Republic of Ireland) David Connolly	(England) Portsmouth	31 December 2012	
