= Seidi =

Seidi is a given name and surname. Notable people with the name include:

- Alberto Seidi (born 1992), Guinea-Bissau–born Portuguese footballer
- Adul Seidi (born 1992), Guinea-Bissauan footballer
- Jaime Seidi (born 1989), Portuguese footballer
- Mehrdad Seidi (born 1992), Iranian deaf judoka
- Seidi Haarla (born 1984), Finnish actress

== See also ==
- Seidy
- Seydi (disambiguation)
- Sieidi
