= Şeyda =

Şeyda is a Turkish given name of Persian origin. Notable people with the name include:

- Hafsa Şeyda Burucu
- Şeyda Hewramî
- Şeyda Kurt (born 1992), German journalist and author
- Şeyda Şerefoğlu

== See also ==
- Seyda
