= Seida (disambiguation) =

Seida was a Spanish cars and trucks dealer and coachbuilder.

Seida may also refer to:

- Seida, Tulkarm, Palestinian town
- Abdulbaset Sieda (born 1956), Kurdish-Syrian academic and politician

== See also ==
- Seidi
- Seyda (disambiguation)
