= Seyda =

Seyda is a Polish surname. Archaic feminine form: Seydowa. Similar Polish surnames from Pomerania are Sayda, Seida, Sejda, Sajda, Zajda, Zejda. These could have been derived from the German Seide, "silk". Notable people with the surname include:

- Halina Seyda (1906–1944), Polish banker and underground activist during the German occupation of Poland during World War II
- Maria Seyda (1893–1989), Polish artist
- Marian Seyda (1879–1967) Polish politician, historian, journalist and publicist associated with the national movement
- Władysław Seyda (1863–1939), Polish lawyer, politician, statesman, and judge

== See also ==
- Şeyda
- Sieda
- Syeda
- Seida (disambiguation)
- Saida (disambiguation)
