= Şeyda Kurt =

German journalist and author

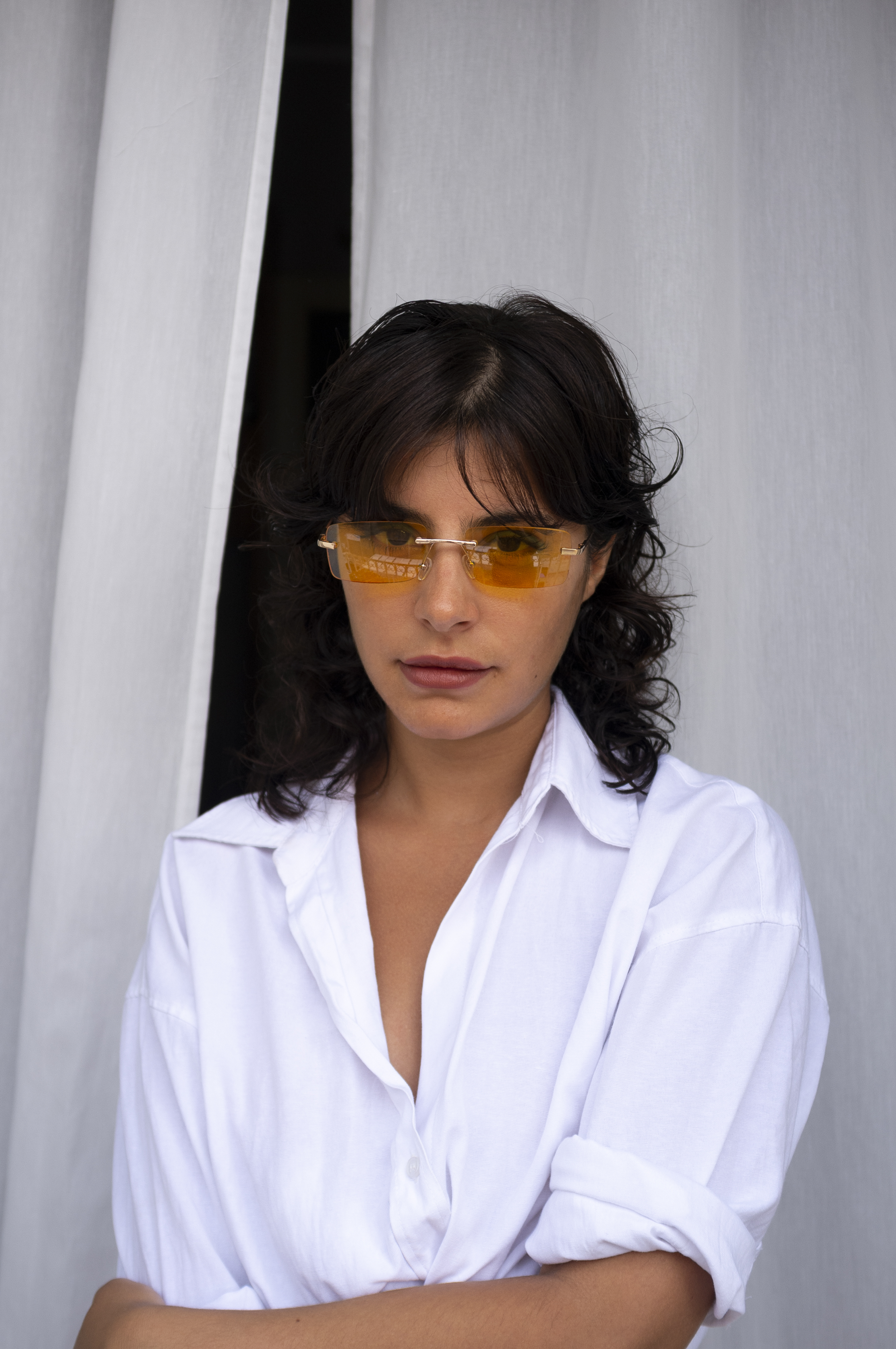
Şeyda Kurt (2022)

Şeyda Kurt (born 1992 in Cologne) is a German journalist and author.

== Life ==
Şeyda Kurt grew up in Cologne, where her grandparents had come from Turkey in the 1960s. Her family is Kurdish and of Turkish origin. From 2011 to 2017, she studied at the University of Cologne and at the Université Bordeaux Montaigne Philosophy and Romance studies. During her studies, she completed various journalistic internships and worked as a freelance journalist for Die Tageszeitung and the Kölner Stadt-Anzeiger, among others. She has also worked for various film festivals (including International Short Film Festival Oberhausen) and cultural events. Between 2017 and 2020, she completed a master's degree in Cultural Journalism at the Berlin University of the Arts, among others with theater critic Dirk Pilz and Bascha Mika. Between 2018 and 2020 she was a scholarship holder of the Fazit Foundation. She lives in Cologne and Berlin.

In October 2023, she travelled to Lampedusa at the invitation of the humanitarian and human rights organisation Medico International and participated in a mission aboard the reconnaissance aircraft of the german sea rescue organisation Sea-Watch over the Mediterranean. In November 2025, Kurt was part of an international delegation of the Progressive International that visited the West Bank, alongside, among others, Croatian philosopher Srećko Horvat and Scottish Guardian journalist Ewen MacAskill. Since January 2026, she has been a member of the advisory board of the association Medien in Bewegung, which is dedicated to political media literacy.

== Work ==
Kurt works as a journalist and author for various media. From 2018 to 2019, she worked in the editorial department of Ze.tt and published numerous commentaries, reports and features during this time. She wrote the column Utopia (own spelling: ❤️topia) for nachtkritik.de until April 2021. In it, she dealt with marginalized images of masculinity and femininity, among other things. She worked as an editor for the Spotify podcast 190220 – Ein Jahr nach Hanau about the racist Terroranschlag in Hanau, which was awarded the Grimme Online Award in the Information category in 2021. Kurt hosted the Spotify podcast Man lernt nie aus. until 2022. Among other things, she is an author for the political feature section on Deutschlandfunk Kultur.

In April 2021, her autobiographical non-fiction book Radical Tenderness – Why Love is Political was published, in which she outlines a concept of "radical tenderness" as a program of justice. In it, she analyses bourgeois love norms from a queer feminist, decolonial, anti-racist and anti-capitalist perspective. perspective and addresses, among other things, her own failed relationships. The book reached number four on the Spiegel bestseller list, remained there for over 20 weeks and was positively reviewed by numerous media outlets.

In March 2023, Kurt's essay Hass – Von der Macht eines widerständigen Gefühls was published. This book also became a bestseller and received positive reviews. In the Süddeutsche Zeitung, for example, Aurelie von Blazekovic wrote that "after her second book [...] Kurt will probably be remembered as one of the most interesting young authors in this country." It was published in English translation by Jackie de Pont under the title Hate: The Uses of a Powerful Emotion by Verso Books.

Kurt is, together with media scholars Holger Pötzsch and Thomas Spies, co-editor of the anthology Spiel*Kritik. Kritische Perspektiven auf Videospiele im Kapitalismus (Game*Critique. Critical Perspectives on Video Games in Capitalism), which was published by Transcript Verlag in April 2025.

She wrote texts for the new production of Eine Volksfeindin at the Nationaltheater Mannheim, the play and her contributions were praised by critics. Katharina Kovalkov-Walth writes: "The radical language of the astute journalist Şeyda Kurt knows no rhetorical taboos and digs deep into the conscience. In April 2025, a production of Bertolt Brecht's play Drums in the Night, directed by Felicitas Brucker and featuring additional texts by Kurt, was performed for the first time at the Schauspielhaus Bochum.

Kurt is also a regular presenter and hosted the award ceremony for the Theaterpreis des Bundes 2021 in July 2021. She gives lectures and workshops on journalistic writing. She is regularly invited as a television and radio guest. Since January 2025, she has been hosting her own talk series at the Schauspielhaus Bochum; guests have included rapper Ebow and philosopher Eva von Redecker.
