= Seydi =

Seydi is a name that may refer to:

== Places ==
=== Iran ===
- Seydi, Iran, a municipality in Iran

=== Turkmenistan ===
- Seýdi, a city in Dänew District, Lebap Province, Turkmenistan
- Seýdi, Garabekewül, a village in Garabekewül District, Lebap Province, Turkmenistan
- Seýdi, Çärjew, a village in Çärjew District, Lebap Province, Turkmenistan
- Seýitnazar Seýdi adyndaky geňeşlik, a rural council in Türkmengala District, Mary Province, Turkmenistan

== People ==
- Ismaïl Seydi, French footballer
- Moussa Seydi, Senegalese footballer
- Seydi Ali Reis, Ottoman admiral
- Seýitnazar Seýdi, Turkmen poet
