= Şeyda Hewramî =

Şeyda Hewramî (Persian: شەیدا هورامی, 1784 – 1852) was a Kurdish poet from Paveh in Iran. He mostly wrote poetry on mysticism and nature and has been described as a prominent writer in Gorani.

He was born in the village of Khaneqah in rural Paveh, while his mausoleum is situated in the village of Sarpir.
