= Gary Maloney =

Gary Maloney (born 1958) is an American political consultant specializing in research, strategy, media and debating for candidates of the Republican National Party.

== Career ==
Maloney is president of the Jackson-Alvarez Group, a consulting firm located in Virginia. Former clients include Rudolph Giuliani, Haley Barbour, Steve Forbes, Connie Mack, Mike Huckabee, George Pataki, George Allen, James Gilmore, Strom Thurmond, Christine Todd Whitman, Mel Martinez, all four Republican national committees, and several state parties.

In 2009, Maloney served as research consultant for Republican nominees in all four statewide campaigns being contested, including the successful gubernatorial efforts of Chris Christie in New Jersey and Bob McDonnell in Virginia.

A veteran of more than 30 years of politics, Maloney has worked for nine presidential campaigns and dozens of races for Senate, Governor, Congress, Legislature, Supreme Court and downticket offices. A native of Los Angeles, he began his research career in 1983, doing opposition research for Ed Rollins and Lee Atwater at the Reagan-Bush '84 re-election campaign. He holds a B.A. in journalism and political science from the University of Southern California and a D.Phil. in politics from Oriel College, Oxford, UK. In 1989, he edited and compiled The Almanac of 1988 Presidential Politics for the Campaign Hotline. In 1990, he incited a controversy over his research of Clayton Williams, a candidate for Governor of Texas. Maloney was reported to have contacted the ex-wife of a Williams staffer, and asked her "inappropriate" questions about Williams's drinking habits. Despite news coverage of this gaffe, Maloney was not fired from his job as the director of strategy and research at the National Republican Congressional Committee. (The Williams campaign later hired Maloney to continue his research on their candidate.)

== Personal life ==
Maloney lives in Northern Virginia with his wife and three children. He was featured briefly in the 2003 HBO series on political lobbyists, K Street, agreeing to conduct research at the behest of a lobbyist.
