= Mehrdad Seidi =

Iranian judoka

Personal information
- Born
- Occupation: Judoka

Sport
- Sport: Judo

Mehrdad Seidi (born 22 July 1992) is an Iranian deaf judoka. He has represented Iran at the Deaflympics on three occasions in 2013, 2017, and 2021. He finished third and was awarded a Bronze Medal competing in the U100 category in the Deaflympics 2017 Samsun.

== Career ==
He made his Deaflympic debut at the 2013 Summer Deaflympics, which was held in Bulgaria. At the 2013 Summer Deaflympics, he competed in the men's 100 kg weight classification criteria, men's judo open classification criteria, and in the men's judo team event. He claimed his maiden Deaflympic medal at his first Deaflympic appearance, when he secured a bronze medal as part of the team event.

He also clinched a gold medal at the 2015 Asia Pacific Deaf Games. He made his second consecutive appearance at the Summer Deaflympics in 2017, which was held in Turkey. He clinched a bronze medal after competing in the weight classification of 100 kg in the men's judo event during the 2017 Summer Deaflympics. He also claimed a bronze medal in the men's judo team event at the 2017 Summer Deaflympics.

He was appointed as the official flag bearer to carry the flag of Iran at the opening ceremony of the 2021 Summer Deaflympics which was held in Caxias do Sul, Brazil. His participation at the 2021 Summer Deaflympics also marked his third consecutive appearance at the Summer Deaflympics. During the 2021 Summer Deaflympics, he clinched a gold medal in the men's 100 kg weight category final after defeating Ukraine's Volodymyr Maklakov.
