= Alberto Seidi =

Portuguese footballer

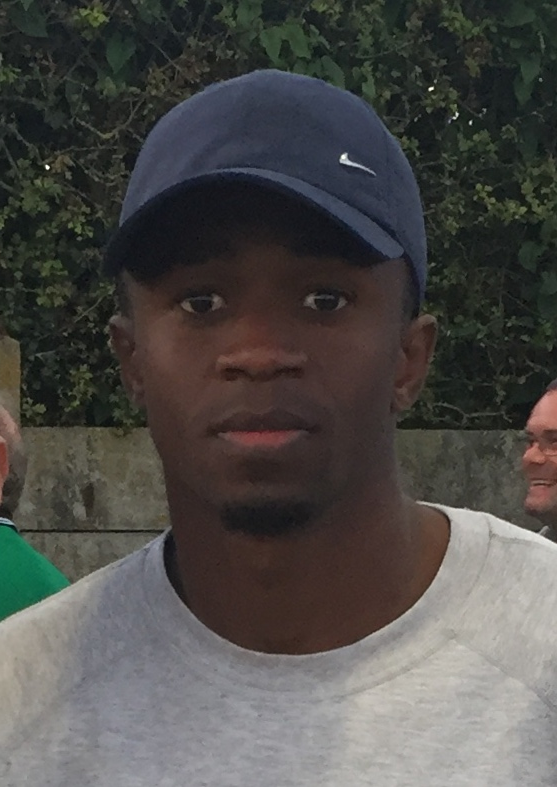
- Alberto Seidi, in 2017

Personal information
- Full name: Alberto Adulai Seidi
- Date of birth: 20 November 1992 (age 33)
- Place of birth: Bissau, Guinea-Bissau
- Height: 1.83 m (6 ft 0 in)
- Position: Forward

Youth career
- Southampton

Senior career*
Years	Team	Apps	(Gls)
2012–2013	Southampton	0	(0)
2012	→ Aldershot Town (loan)	1	(0)
2013–2014	Workington	6	(0)
2014	AD Oliveirense	9	(3)
2015	Espinho	11	(1)
2015	Torreense	8	(1)
2016	Cesarense	7	(1)
2016	Lustiano Vildemoinhos	10	(3)
2017	Besëlidhja Lezhë	3	(1)
2017	North Ferriby United	10	(0)

International career
2012	Portugal U21	2	(0)
- * Club domestic league appearances and goals as of 20 March 2018

Alberto Adulai Seidi (born 20 November 1992) is a Guinea-Bissau–born former Portuguese footballer. He began his career at Premier League club Southampton, playing primarily as a winger although he was also comfortable operating as a centre-forward.

== Club career ==
Alberto Seidi was originally a member of the Guinea-Bissau Academy in his home country before joining the English club Southampton as a youth player. He made his debut for Southampton's under-21 team in the Under-21 Premier League during the 2012–13 season, coming on as an 83rd-minute substitute for Jake Sinclair in the second game of the season against Newcastle United's under-21 team on 14 September 2012.

On 10 November 2012, Seidi was signed on a month-long loan deal by the local League Two club Aldershot Town from Southampton. He made his debut for the club on the same day in a 2–0 league defeat against Bradford City, coming on as a substitute for midfielder Scott Donnelly in the 60th minute.

On 4 June 2013, he was released by Southampton after failing to regain his pre-injury form. After his release from Southampton, Seidi joined AD Oliveirense in Portugal. During the 2013–14 season, he played nine matches and scored three goals. For the 2014–15 season, Seidi signed for Espinho, who compete in the Campeonato de Portugal, the third tier of Portuguese football. He played eleven games and scored one goal. In the 2015–16 season, Seidi joined Sport Clube União Torreense, also of the Campeonato de Portugal playing eight games and scoring one goal. Halfway through that season, he transferred to Futebol Clube Cesarense, where he featured in seven matches and scored one goal. For the 2016–17 season, Seidi remained in the Campeonato de Portugal by joining Lusitano Futebol Clube, playing ten games and scoring three goals.

In January 2017, Seidi left Portugal to play football in Albania, where it was rumoured he would join the country's most successful club, KF Tirana. However, upon his arrival, he discovered that he had been misled; rather than signing for KF Tirana in the Kategoria Superiore, he signed for KS Besëlidhja Lezhë in the Albanian First Division. Amid the ensuing controversy, Seidi featured in three matches and scored one goal for KS Besëlidhja Lezhë before sustaining an injury. He subsequently left the club by mutual consent and returned to England for treatment. In May 2017, Seidi turned down a contract from Flamurtari Vlorë in the Kategoria Superiore, as he did not wish to continue playing in Albania.

In June 2017, he joined North Ferriby United following a successful trial with the club. Despite his brief tenure, he quickly became a fan favourite. He played ten games in the National League without scoring a goal before leaving the club in November 2017.

== International career ==
Seidi has been capped twice for the Portugal under-20 team, both appearances coming in friendly matches against the Slovakia under-21 team on 10 and 12 November 2012. In October 2012, he received his first call-up to the Portugal under-21 team for a warm-up match against the Ukraine under-21 team.

== Career statistics ==
As of 7 September 2015

Appearances and goals by club, season and competition
Club	Season	League			National cup		League cup		Total	
Club	Season	Division	Apps	Goals	Apps	Goals	Apps	Goals	Apps	Goals
Aldershot Town (loan)	2012–13	League Two	1	0	0	0	0	0	1	0
AD Oliveirense	2013–14	Campeonato Nacional	9	3	0	0	—		9	3
Feirense	2014–15	Segunda Liga	0	0	0	0	—		0	0
Espinho	2014–15	Campeonato Nacional	11	1	0	0	—		11	1
S.C.U. Torreense	2015–16	Campeonato Nacional	2	1	0	0	—		2	1
Career total			22	5	0	0	0	0	22	5
