= Harry Kane =

English footballer (born 1993)

Harry Kane MBE
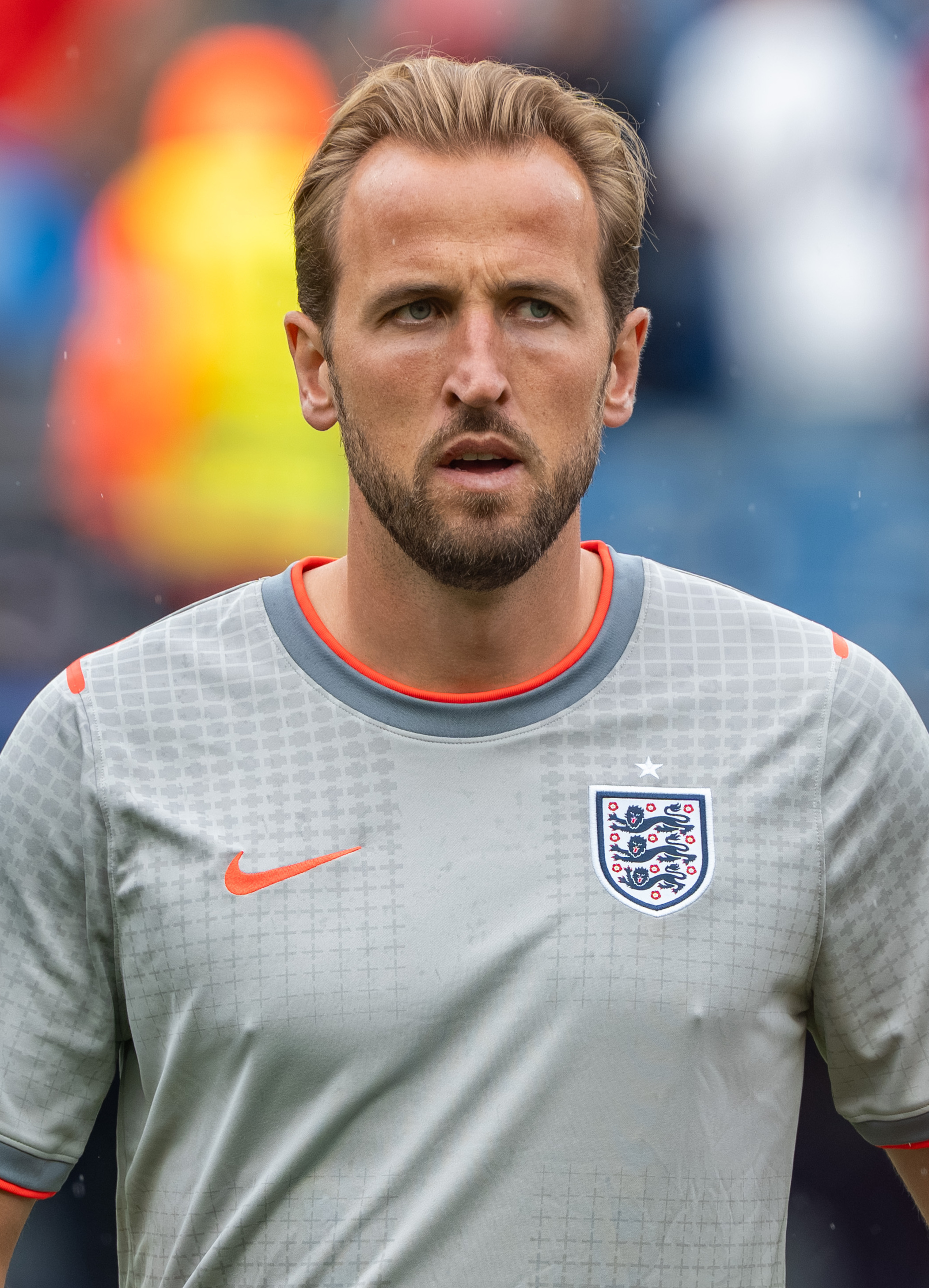
- Kane with England in 2026

Personal information
- Full name: Harry Edward Kane
- Date of birth: 28 July 1993 (age 33)
- Place of birth: Leytonstone, London, England
- Height: 6 ft 2 in (1.88 m)
- Position: Striker

Team information
- Current team: Bayern Munich
- Number: 9

Youth career
- 1999–2001: Ridgeway Rovers
- 2002: Arsenal
- 2002–2004: Ridgeway Rovers
- 2004: Watford
- 2004–2009: Tottenham Hotspur

Senior career*
Years	Team	Apps	(Gls)
2009–2023	Tottenham Hotspur	317	(213)
2011	→ Leyton Orient (loan)	18	(5)
2012	→ Millwall (loan)	22	(7)
2012–2013	→ Norwich City (loan)	3	(0)
2013	→ Leicester City (loan)	13	(2)
2023–	Bayern Munich	104	(102)

International career^{‡}
2010	England U17	6	(2)
2010–2012	England U19	14	(6)
2013	England U20	3	(1)
2013–2015	England U21	14	(8)
2015–	England	127	(93)
Medal record
Men's football
Representing England
FIFA World Cup
Third place	2026 Canada–Mexico–US
UEFA European Championship
Runner-up	2020 Europe
Runner-up	2024 Germany
UEFA Nations League
Third place	2019 Portugal
- * Club domestic league appearances and goals as of 21:24, 20 November 2026 (UTC) ‡ National team caps and goals as of 22:10, 15 November 2026 (UTC)

Harry Edward Kane (born 28 July 1993) is an English professional footballer who plays as a striker for Bundesliga club Bayern Munich and captains the England national team. Known for his clinical finishing, passing, vision, and tactical versatility, he is widely regarded as one of the best players in the world. Kane has scored over 500 career goals for club and country, being Tottenham Hotspur's all-time top goalscorer (280), England's all-time top goalscorer (93), and the highest-scoring English player in the UEFA Champions League (58). He is also the Premier League's second-highest all-time goalscorer (213) and Bayern Munich's sixth-highest all-time goalscorer (156).

Beginning his senior career with Tottenham Hotspur in 2009, Kane had loan spells out to clubs across the English football pyramid, including Leyton Orient, Millwall, Leicester City, and Norwich City. Kane's involvement at Tottenham increased after Mauricio Pochettino became head coach in 2014, being named PFA Young Player of the Year in the 2014–15 season. In the 2015–16 and 2016–17 seasons, Kane was the league's top goalscorer. In the latter campaign, he helped Tottenham finish as Premier League runners-up with a club-record 86 points and was named the PFA Fans' Player of the Year. In the 2018–19 season, Kane reached the UEFA Champions League final. In the 2020–21 season, he finished as both the Premier League's top goalscorer (23) and top assist provider (14).

In 2023, Kane became the most expensive signing in Bundesliga history as he joined Bayern Munich in a transfer worth €110 million. In his first season, he scored 44 club goals, winning the Gerd Müller Trophy and the European Golden Shoe. In the following season, he won the Bundesliga title, his first major trophy, and was awarded Bundesliga Player of the Season. After helping Bayern win the double and scoring 14 goals in the Champions League (one behind the top scorer), totalling 61 goals across the 2025–26 season, Kane was awarded the 2026 Ballon d'Or and his second Gerd Müller Trophy.

Kane made his senior debut for England in 2015, at the age of 21. He helped them reach semi-finals of the 2018 FIFA World Cup, finish as runners-up at UEFA Euro 2020 and Euro 2024, and achieve a third-place finish at the 2026 World Cup—the latter being England's highest finish at a World Cup since 1966. He won the World Cup Golden Boot in 2018, finished as the joint top scorer at Euro 2024, and is England's all-time leading goalscorer at the World Cup (14). Kane is also England's most-capped male player (127).

== Early life ==
Harry Edward Kane was born on 28 July 1993 at Whipps Cross University Hospital in Leytonstone, London, the second son of Kim (née Hogg) and Patrick Kane, and has one older brother, Charlie. He has Irish ancestry through his father, who was born in Galway. The family lived in Walthamstow before moving to Chingford. Kane attended Larkswood Primary Academy until 2004, followed by Chingford Foundation School, which was also attended by David Beckham. He has played football since a very young age, joining the local Walthamstow club Ridgeway Rovers in 1999, when he was six. Kane spoke about football in his family:

I think the sporting genes come from my Mum's side of the family although the topic is a hot debate in the Kane household. Dad probably won't like me saying that, but I think my granddad Eric on my Mum's side was quite a good footballer, and played at a decent level.

Kane also said: "Most of my family were Spurs fans and I grew up 15 minutes from the ground, so I was always going to be a Spurs fan". This was despite being an Arsenal fan in his younger years. He named former Spurs striker Teddy Sheringham as his childhood idol, describing him as a "great finisher" and a role model for his ability to get into the box and score goals. Other childhood sporting influences he cited include David Beckham and Jermain Defoe. Kane has also spoken of his admiration for the former Brazil forward Ronaldo, saying that he loved to watch footage of him on YouTube: "He was one of the first ones I looked at and thought, 'Wow. He's a goalscorer, I want to be a goalscorer.'"

== Club career ==
=== Tottenham Hotspur ===
==== 2004–2010: Youth career ====
Kane first played for a local club, Ridgeway Rovers, in 1999 when he was six, and joined the Arsenal youth academy when he was eight years old. He was released after one season for being "a bit chubby" and not "very athletic", according to Liam Brady who was then in charge of Arsenal's academy. Manager Arsène Wenger stated in November 2015 that he was disappointed that Arsenal chose to release Kane. He also had a trial at Tottenham Hotspur but was not initially successful, and he returned to his old club Ridgeway Rovers. In 2004, at the age of eleven, he joined Watford academy for a four- to six-week trial, and was then given another chance at Tottenham after he impressed playing for Watford against Tottenham. He first played at Tottenham as a midfielder – initially in a holding position, then as an attacking midfielder.

In his early days at Tottenham, Kane did not stand out as a player as he was neither big nor was he particularly quick, but those who worked with him noted his constant desire to improve various aspects of his game. A couple of years after joining, he had a large growth spurt that made him taller and physically stronger. In the 2008–09 season, he played in the under-16s side that competed in the Copa Chivas tournament in Mexico, and the Bellinzona tournament in Switzerland, scoring three goals. In July 2009, on his 16th birthday, he signed a scholarship contract with Tottenham.

In the 2009–10 season, Kane played 22 times for Tottenham's under-18s, scoring 18 goals. Kane appeared on the first-team bench twice during the 2009–10 season. Both matches were in home domestic cup victories: one the League Cup fixture against Everton on 27 October 2009, and the other in the FA Cup fourth-round replay against Bolton Wanderers on 24 February 2010.

==== 2010–2014: Loan spells across England ====
Kane signed his first professional contract with Tottenham in July 2010. The then U-21 coach Tim Sherwood believed that Kane could benefit from a loan spell, and on 7 January 2011, Kane moved to Leyton Orient on loan until the end of the 2010–11 season. Manager Russell Slade was "happy" at his arrival and said, "I'm sure he will have an impact with us over the coming months". He made his first-team debut for Orient on 15 January, coming on as a substitute for Scott McGleish in the 73rd minute of a 1–1 draw away to Rochdale. A week later, Kane scored his first first-team goal against Sheffield Wednesday; making his first-ever start, an "unmarked" Kane scored from a Dean Cox free kick in the 57th minute as Orient eventually won 4–0. Slade said that he was "delighted" that Kane scored a goal on his first league start. On 12 February, he scored twice in a 4–1 win over Bristol Rovers, after coming on as a substitute for McGleish in the 70th minute. He ended the season scoring five goals in 18 matches.

On 25 August 2011, Kane made his first appearance for Tottenham, starting in the second leg of their UEFA Europa League qualification round against Hearts, with Tottenham making changes after winning the first leg 5–0. His debut was a goalless match, although he won a penalty after being fouled by goalkeeper Jamie MacDonald, who then saved the penalty which Kane took himself. He went on to make six appearances in the Europa League that season, scoring his first Tottenham goal in the 4–0 win away to Shamrock Rovers on 15 December 2011.

On 29 December 2011, Kane and Tottenham teammate Ryan Mason agreed to join Championship club Millwall on loan from 1 January 2012 until the end of the season. After making his debut against Bristol City, manager Kenny Jackett said that he had "very good debut" but was "unlucky not to score". He also said that Kane would "be a good addition" for the club in the second half of the season. He went on to score seven goals in the final 14 matches of the season. Kane scored nine goals in 27 matches which resulted in him being named Millwall's Young Player of the Year for 2011–12. His run of goals scored towards the end of the season has been credited with helping to raise Millwall in the table away from the threat of relegation that season.

Kane spent the 2012–13 preseason with Tottenham, scoring a hat-trick in a 6–0 away win against Southend United on 10 August 2012. On 18 August, he made his Premier League debut, against Newcastle United. Coming as an 86th-minute substitute for Sandro, Tottenham lost 2–1.

On 31 August 2012, Kane joined Premier League team Norwich City on a season-long loan, making his debut as a substitute against West Ham United. Kane suffered an injury, breaking a metatarsal bone, in the League Cup tie against Doncaster Rovers in only his second appearance. The 19-year-old underwent his rehabilitation at Tottenham but returned to action for Norwich on 29 December 2012, coming off the bench at half time as Norwich lost 3–4 to Manchester City. However, with Tottenham having been unable to add to their attacking options during the January transfer window, they opted to recall Kane on 1 February 2013, four months before he was due to return.

Twenty days after he was recalled to Tottenham, Kane joined Leicester City for the remainder of the season to aid in the club's push for automatic promotion from the Championship. He marked his home debut with a goal against Blackburn Rovers, in a 3–0 win on 26 February 2013. He made 13 appearances for the East Midlands club, eight from the bench, and they reached the play-off semi-final before being eliminated by Watford.

Kane scored his first Tottenham goal of the 2013–14 season at White Hart Lane in a League Cup tie against Hull City, scoring the equaliser in extra time, the match finished 2–2. Tottenham won 8–7 on penalties, with Kane taking and converting the fifth of the nine sets of spot-kicks.

On 7 April 2014, Kane was given his first Premier League start for Tottenham by manager Tim Sherwood, in a 5–1 win against Sunderland, and scored his first Premier League goal in the 59th minute. He also scored in the following match, helping Tottenham to recover from a 3–0 deficit against West Bromwich Albion before eventually drawing 3–3. He scored for the third match in a row on 19 April, this time helping Tottenham to a 3–1 London derby win at home over Fulham.

==== 2014–2015: PFA Young Player of the Year ====
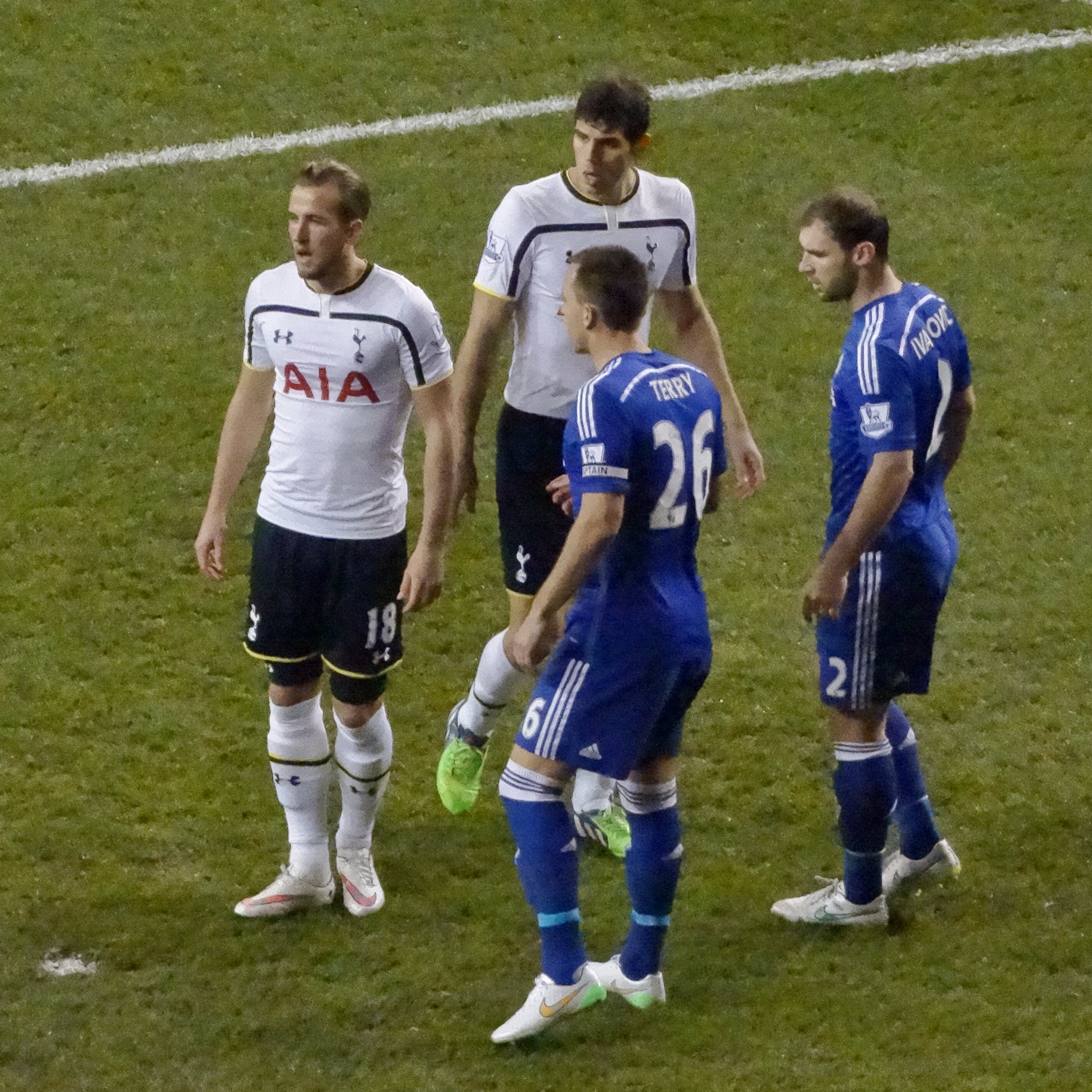
Kane (left) playing for Tottenham Hotspur in 2015

Kane made his first appearance of the 2014–15 season as a substitute in a London derby against West Ham on the opening day of the Premier League season, providing an assist for the match-winning goal by Eric Dier. He scored in both matches against Cypriot opposition AEL Limassol in Tottenham's UEFA Europa League play-offs, scoring an 80th-minute winner in the first leg, and opening the scoring in the 3–0 second leg victory after missing a penalty. He scored a late goal against Nottingham Forest in the League Cup to secure a 3–1 victory for Tottenham on 24 September 2014. On 23 October 2014, Kane scored his first professional hat-trick for Tottenham in a 5–1 win over Asteras Tripolis in the group stage of the UEFA Europa League. Kane was forced to play in goal for the final three minutes, after Hugo Lloris had been sent off with no substitutions remaining, and conceded a goal when he dropped a free-kick from Jerónimo Barrales.

On 2 November 2014, Kane came on as a second-half substitute in Tottenham's 2–1 win over Aston Villa and scored his first Premier League goal of the season to win the match in the 90th minute. Manager Mauricio Pochettino, who was appointed to replace Sherwood and had a rocky start at the club, has since said that this goal saved him from the sack. Henceforth, under Pochettino, Kane became a regular in Spurs' starting line-up. He was selected to start a week later for the first time in this Premier League season, and although the team lost 2–1 at home to Stoke City, he retained his place in the first XI for Spurs' 2–1 win away to Hull City on 23 November, scoring the team's equalising goal. Between 14 and 26 December, Kane scored in three consecutive 2–1 wins for Tottenham, against Swansea City, Burnley and Leicester City. On 1 January 2015, Kane scored twice and won a penalty as Tottenham defeated rivals and league leaders Chelsea 5–3, and he scored a further two in a 3–0 away win against West Bromwich Albion on 31 January, including one from a penalty. Kane set up Christian Eriksen's late equaliser against Sheffield United on 28 January 2015, a goal which put Tottenham into the 2015 League Cup final. His performances led to him being named as the Premier League Player of the Month for January 2015.

On 2 February 2015, Kane signed a new five-and-a-half-year contract with the club. Five days later, he scored both of Tottenham's goals as they came from behind to defeat Arsenal in the North London derby, his 21st and 22nd goals of the season across all competitions. After scoring against Arsenal, Liverpool and West Ham United, Kane was again named as the Premier League Player of the Month for February 2015, becoming only the fourth player to win the award in consecutive months. Tottenham lost the League Cup final 2–0 to rivals Chelsea on 1 March 2015, which Kane described as the "worst feeling in the world". Twenty days later, he scored his first Premier League hat-trick in a 4–3 home win over his former loan club Leicester; this brought him to 19 league goals in the season, making him the division's top scorer.

On 5 April, Kane captained Tottenham for the first time in a 0–0 draw with Burnley at Turf Moor. Two weeks later, he scored his 30th goal of the season in a 3–1 win against Newcastle United at St James' Park, making him the first Tottenham player to reach that milestone since Gary Lineker in 1991–92. Later that month, he was included as one of two forwards in the PFA Team of the Year, alongside Chelsea's Diego Costa. He was also voted the PFA Young Player of the Year. On 24 May 2015, he headed in an Eric Dier cross for the only goal of an away win over Everton on the final day of the season to confirm fifth place for Tottenham, thus qualifying them to the group stage of the following season's UEFA Europa League. It was his 21st goal of the league campaign, equalling a Premier League club record alongside Teddy Sheringham, Jürgen Klinsmann and Gareth Bale. At the end of the season, Kane remarked that he had done more in the single campaign than he had expected to do in his whole career.

==== 2015–2016: Premier League top goalscorer ====
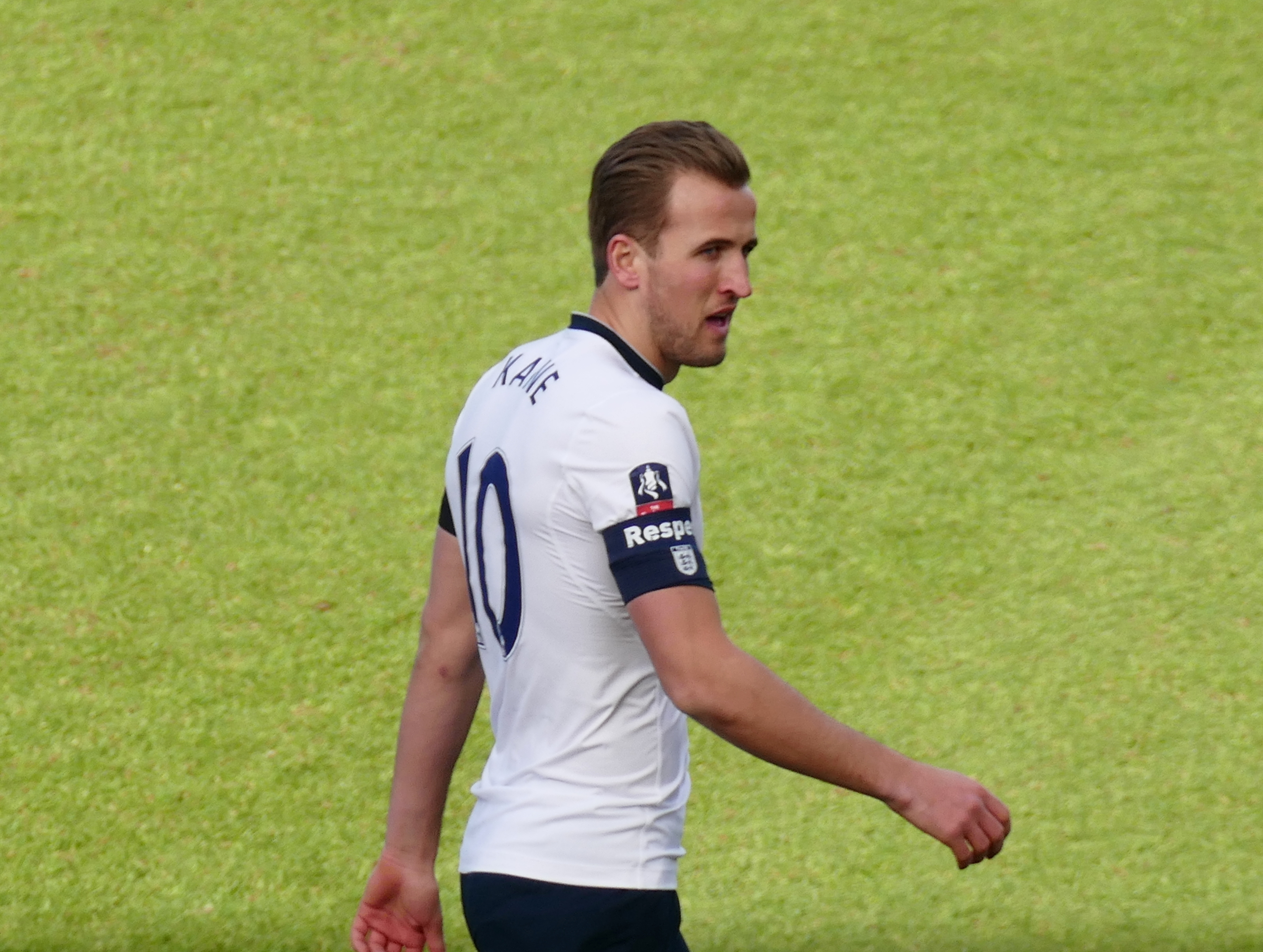
Kane playing for Tottenham Hotspur in 2016

On Tottenham's pre-season tour of Australia, Kane attracted numerous fans while visiting the Westfield Sydney shopping centre, resulting in the club sending a minibus to escort him away. On 29 July 2015, Tottenham were the guests in the 2015 MLS All-Star Game at Dick's Sporting Goods Park in Commerce City, Colorado. They lost 2–1 to the MLS All-Stars, with Kane scoring their consolation goal in the 37th minute after beating a challenge from Omar Gonzalez, and he was later substituted in the 77th minute.

Kane's squad number was changed from 18 to 10, previously worn by Emmanuel Adebayor. In an interview with The Daily Telegraph, he said that he changed the number "to become a club legend". With Adebayor and Roberto Soldado having been put up for sale, he began the season as the club's only forward, and the third-choice captain behind Hugo Lloris and Jan Vertonghen. After a 748-minute drought, he scored his first goal of the season on 26 September 2015 as Tottenham came from behind to defeat leaders Manchester City 4–1. Eight days later, he scored an own goal from Jonjo Shelvey's corner kick away to Swansea City, but Tottenham fought back to a 2–2 draw.

On 25 October 2015, Kane scored a hat-trick, including a penalty which he won himself, as Tottenham came from conceding a first-minute goal to triumph 5–1 away to AFC Bournemouth. Eight days later, he recorded his fifth goal of the season with the final goal in a 3–1 win at home to Aston Villa. On 8 November 2015, he gave Tottenham a half-time lead against Arsenal at the Emirates Stadium, albeit in a 1–1 draw; this goal past Petr Čech was from his first touch of Danny Rose's long pass.

Eighteen days after that, he recorded his ninth goal in six matches, the only one of an away match against Qarabağ, qualifying Tottenham to the knockout stages of the season's UEFA Europa League. On 19 December 2015, Kane made his 100th appearance for the club in a 2–0 win away to Southampton, and scored his 10th goal in his last 10 matches. A week later, he added two more in a 3–0 win over former loan employers Norwich, putting him on 27 Premier League goals for the year 2015, breaking Sheringham's club record. On 10 January 2016, he scored his 50th goal for Tottenham in a 2–2 draw against Leicester in the third round of the FA Cup.

Kane was Premier League Player of the Month for the third time in March 2016, after scoring five goals in four games, including an angled strike from the corner of the 18-yard box in the North London derby which Kane called "one of my best goals technically". After scoring his 22nd league goal of the season in a 1–1 draw against Liverpool at Anfield on 2 April, Kane became the club's highest goalscorer in a single Premier League season, with six games of the season remaining.

Kane ended the season winning the Premier League Golden Boot, finishing one goal ahead of Sergio Agüero and Jamie Vardy with 25 goals. He was named in the PFA Team of the Year for the second consecutive season, as he helped Tottenham to a third-place finish, and UEFA Champions League qualification.

==== 2016–2017: League runner-up and second Golden Boot ====
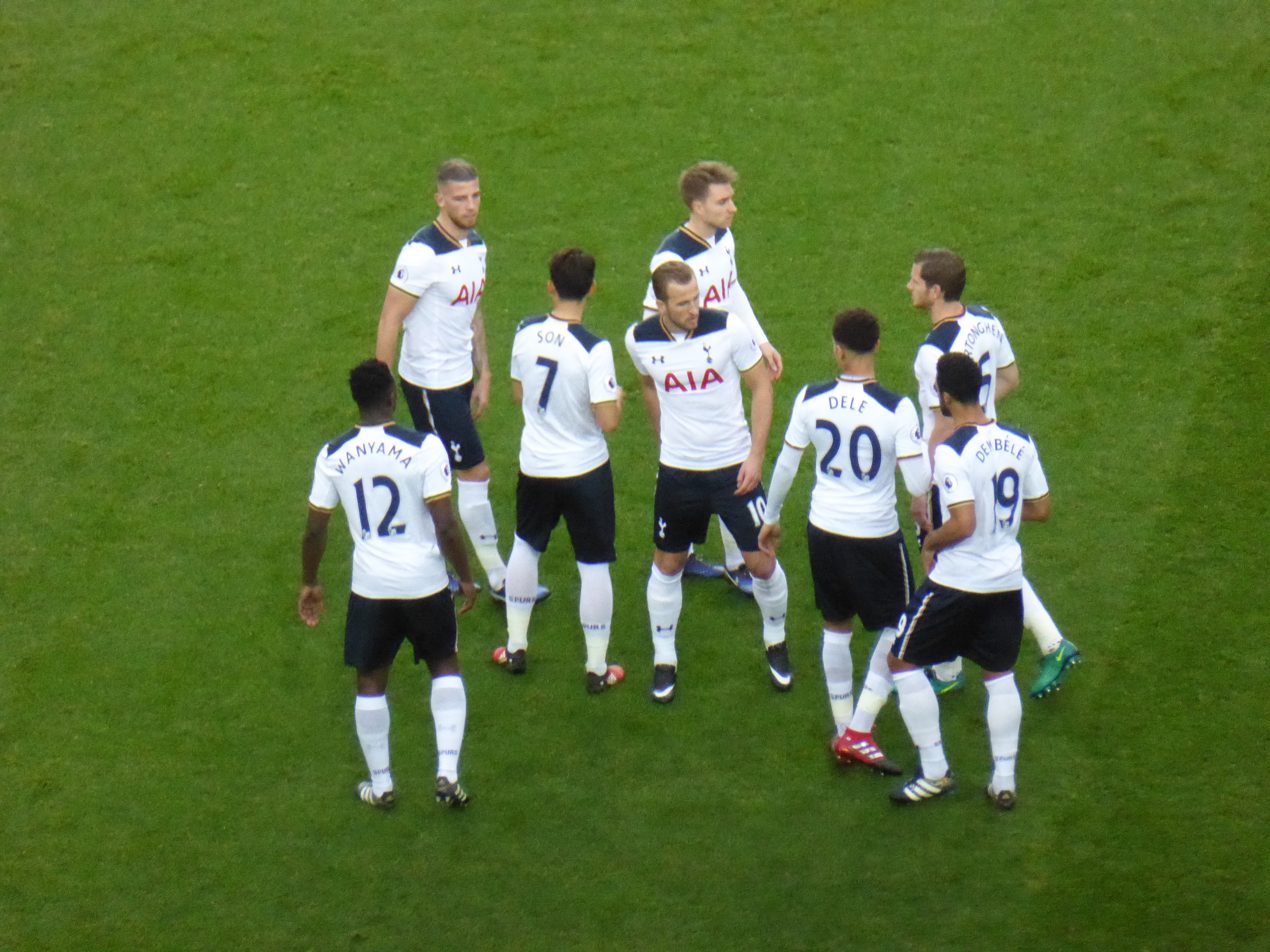
Kane (centre) with his Tottenham Hotspur teammates in 2016

In the absence of Hugo Lloris, Kane captained Tottenham in their opening home match of the 2016–17 season, assisting Victor Wanyama's winning goal as Spurs beat Crystal Palace 1–0 in a London derby at White Hart Lane. He opened his scoring account in the fourth matchday of the Premier League season, providing the final goal in a 4–0 win away to Stoke City.

On 14 September 2016, Kane made his UEFA Champions League debut in Spurs' 2–1 loss to Monaco at Wembley Stadium. Four days later, he scored the winning goal against Sunderland in the Premier League, but had to be helped off the field after twisting his right ankle attempting a tackle of Papy Djilobodji. Reports indicated that the ligaments in Kane's ankle were damaged, ruling him out for six-to-eight weeks. After missing five league matches and three in the Champions League group phase, Kane made his return at rivals Arsenal on 6 November, scoring from the penalty spot to equalise in a 1–1 draw. On 22 November, he scored his first Champions League goal in the return fixture against Monaco at the Stade Louis II, a game which saw Spurs eliminated from the competition with a 2–1 loss.

On 1 December 2016, Kane signed a new contract with Tottenham, keeping him at the club until 2022. On 1 January 2017, he made his 100th Premier League appearance, scoring the first Premier League goal of the new year against Watford in the 27th minute, which he extended to a brace after scoring again six minutes later. In his first match after the birth of his daughter, Kane scored a hat-trick in a 4–0 win against West Brom on 14 January. In the fifth round of the 2016–17 FA Cup on 19 February 2017, Kane scored all three goals as Tottenham beat Fulham 3–0. This meant his fifth career hat-trick, and his second in 2017. On 26 February 2017, Kane once again scored a hat-trick as Tottenham beat Stoke 4–0, his third hat-trick in nine games, and his second in consecutive domestic games. The first of these goals was his 100th in club football. He was named Player of the Month for the fourth time in his career in February 2017.

In March 2017, he injured his ankle in an FA Cup match against former loan club Millwall. On 15 April, Kane scored his 20th Premier League goal of the season against Bournemouth on his first start in a month after returning from injury. This made him the fourth player in Premier League history to achieve 20 goals in three consecutive seasons, after Alan Shearer, Thierry Henry and Ruud van Nistelrooy.

On 20 April, Kane was named in the PFA Team of the Year for the third consecutive season. He was also included in the six player shortlists for the PFA Players' Player of the Year and PFA Young Player of the Year awards. Two days later, he scored in Tottenham's 4–2 FA Cup semi-final loss to rivals Chelsea at Wembley Stadium. In the last match at White Hart Lane on 14 May, Harry Kane scored the 2–0 goal as Tottenham beat Manchester United 2–1. With two games remaining of the season, Kane stood on 22 goals, two fewer than Romelu Lukaku. With a combined seven goals in the last two fixtures (a 6–1 win over reigning champions Leicester City and a 7–1 win against Hull City), Kane finished as the top scorer of the Premier League on 29 goals, and thus won his second consecutive Golden Boot, becoming only the fifth player to do so.

==== 2017–2018: Record breaking year ====
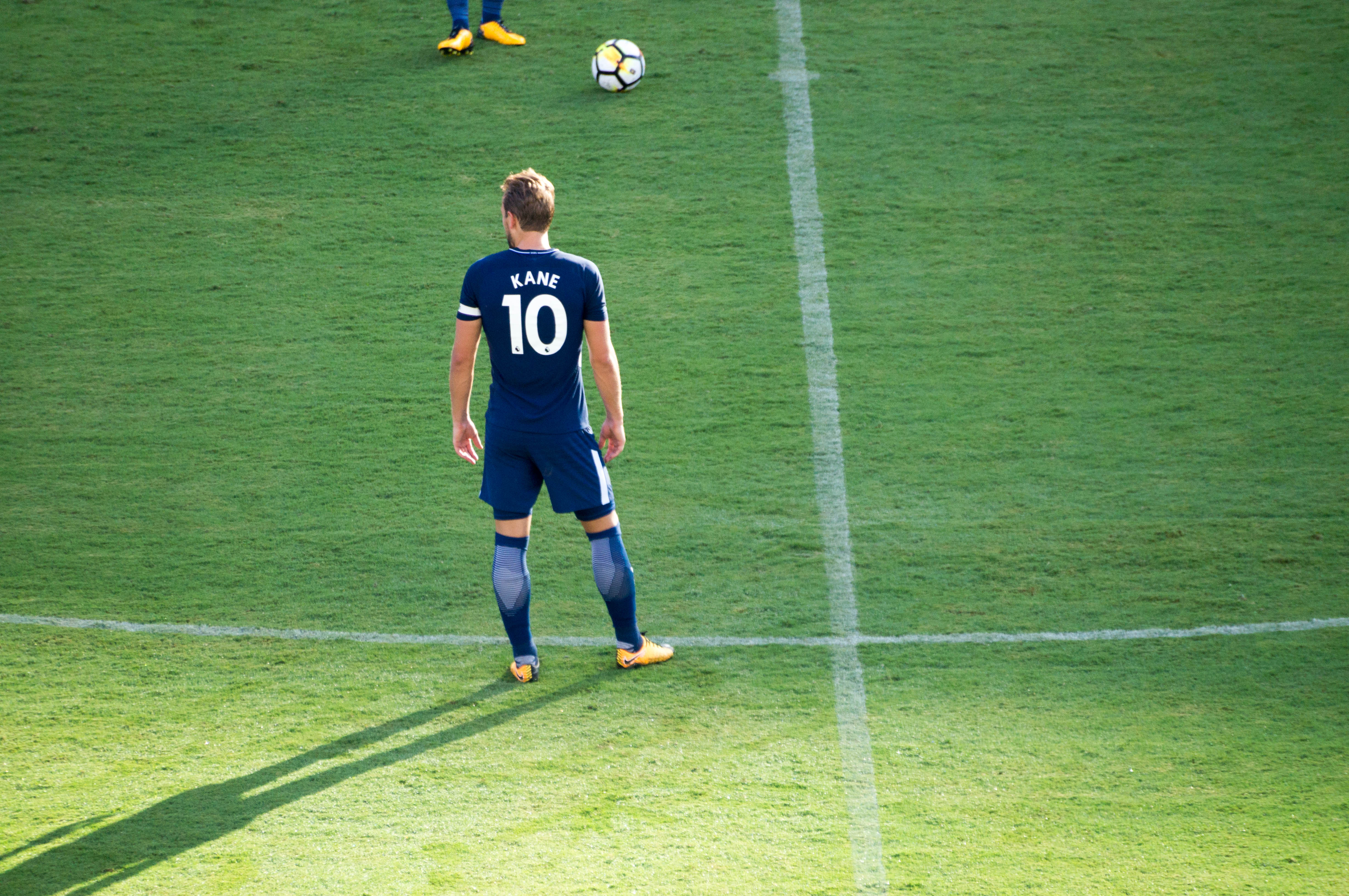
Kane playing for Tottenham Hotspur in 2017

After failing to find the back of the net in Tottenham's first three games, Kane scored a brace in three of his next four appearances for the club across all competitions. His opening goal against Everton on 9 September was his 100th overall for the club, coming in his 169th appearance. On 26 September, Kane scored his first UEFA Champions League hat-trick in a 3–0 group stage win against Cypriot champions APOEL. He was awarded Premier League Player of the Month for the fifth time, and named September 2017 – in which he scored 13 goals in 10 club and international games – as the best month of his career.

On 23 December 2017, Kane equalled Alan Shearer's record of 36 Premier League goals in a calendar year, having scored a hat-trick in a 0–3 away win to Burnley. He surpassed Shearer's record the following game with another hat-trick in the 5–2 home win against Southampton, ending the year with 39 Premier League goals. The hat-trick, his sixth of the year in the Premier League (eighth in all competitions), also made him the first player in Premier League history to score six hat-tricks in a year. With 56 goals scored in all competitions for the year, he also became Europe's top goalscorer of 2017, breaking the seven-year dominance of Lionel Messi and Cristiano Ronaldo as Europe's top goalscorer in a calendar year.

In January 2018, he scored twice in the 4–0 home win against Everton, and became Tottenham's top goalscorer in the Premier League era, breaking Teddy Sheringham's record of 97 Premier League goals for the club. On 4 February, Kane scored an added-time penalty to equalise in a 2–2 draw with Liverpool at Anfield for his 100th Premier League goal; he achieved the century of league goals in 141 games, beaten only by Alan Shearer's 124. He was named in the PFA Team of the Year for the fourth consecutive season in April 2018, alongside fellow forwards Mohamed Salah and Sergio Agüero. On 8 June, Kane signed a new contract to keep him at the club until 2024.

==== 2018–2019: UEFA Champions League runner-up ====
Kane started the season opener against Newcastle United without scoring, before opening his account against Fulham the following weekend. In doing so he ended his hoodoo of failing to score a Premier League goal in the month of August. He also scored for the first time at Old Trafford in the following game as Tottenham won 3–0 in what was only their third away win against Manchester United since 1992, as well as the biggest away win against the club in 46 years. He scored the opening goal against Cardiff City on 1 January 2019, and with that goal, he became the first player to have scored a goal against every Premier League team he has faced. On 13 January, against Manchester United at Wembley Stadium, Kane injured his ankle ligament late in the game, thereby missing crucial matches including the UEFA Champions League round of 16 home game.

He returned to the first team squad on 23 February 2019, in a match against Burnley, and was immediately placed in the starting eleven. He scored the equalising goal in the 65th minute to tie the score 1–1, although the match ended a 2–1 defeat. Kane scored the only goal in the Champions League round of 16 away tie against Borussia Dortmund to ensure a 4–0 win on aggregate and progress to the club's second quarter-final in the Champions League. The goal also made him the club's top goalscorer in European competitions with 24 goals scored. During the first leg of the quarter-final in the Champions League on 9 April 2019 against Manchester City, he again suffered an ankle injury, which ended his season domestically in the Premier League. He did, however, return for the Champions League final on 1 June, although his selection after his injury became a subject of debate as Tottenham lost 2–0 to Liverpool.

==== 2019–2020: Injury struggles ====
Kane started Tottenham's first game of the 2019–20 season, scoring twice in a 3–1 home win against Aston Villa. Kane's first goal of the game was his first at the Tottenham Hotspur Stadium. On 1 January 2020, in a 1–0 defeat to Southampton at St Mary's Stadium, Kane suffered a hamstring injury. The damage to his hamstring required an operation which would see him out of action for a few months. Due to the COVID-19 pandemic which resulted in the suspension of League matches, he did not play any further matches until 19 June. On 23 June, in his 200th Premier League appearance for Tottenham, he scored his first goal of 2020 against West Ham, sealing a 2–0 win.

==== 2020–2021: Third Golden Boot and Playmaker of the Season ====
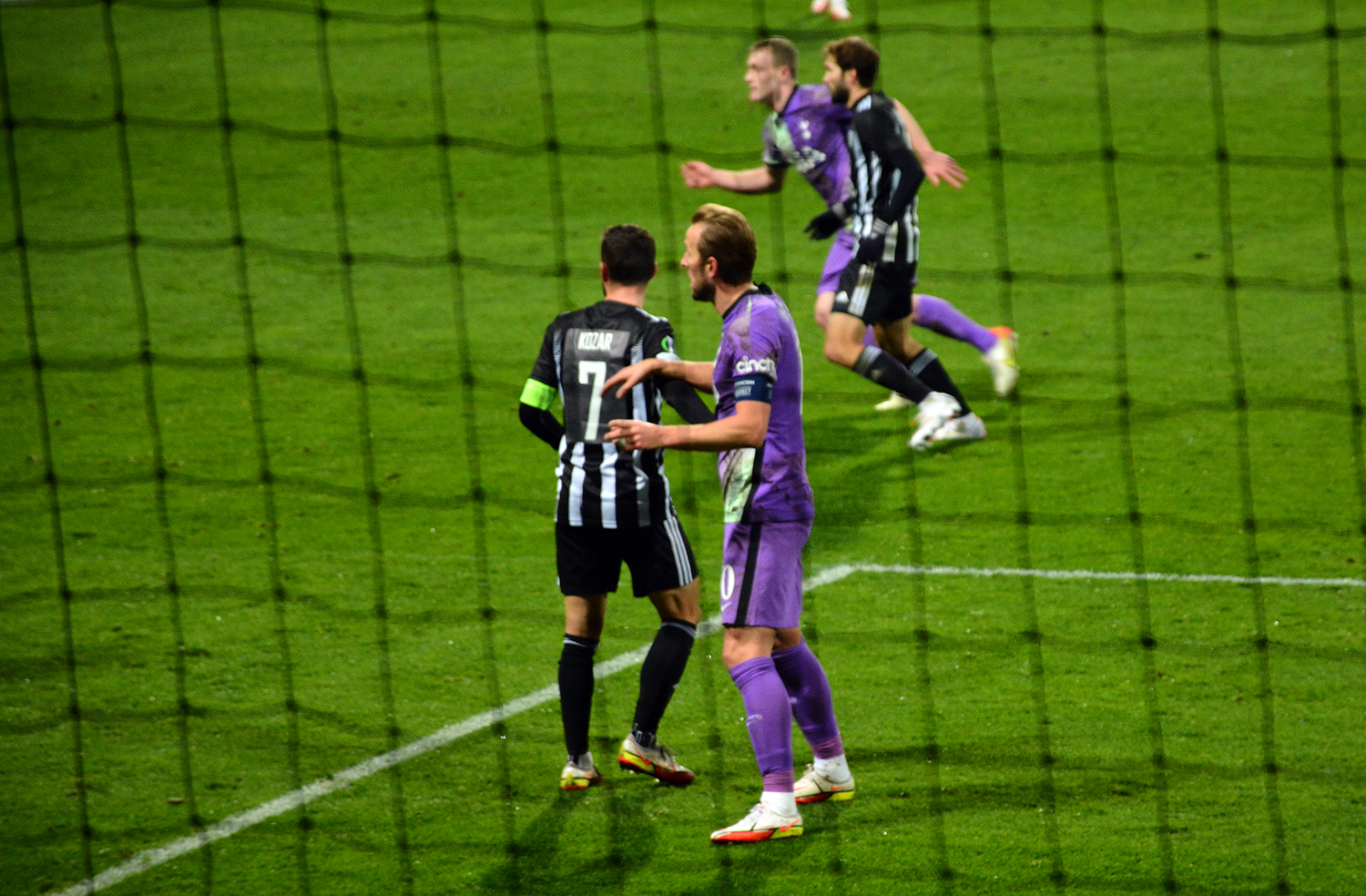
Kane (in purple) playing for Tottenham Hotspur in 2021

Kane scored his first goal of the season in the Europa League match against Lokomotiv Plovdiv, helping the team to win 2–1 after Plovdiv had two players sent off late in the second half. His first league goal of the 2020–21 season came in the second league match following a spree of four goals which were all scored by Son Heung-min and assisted by Kane, giving Spurs a 5–2 win over Southampton. This is the first time in Premier League history a player has provided four assists to the same teammate in a match and Kane became just the sixth player in Premier League history to assist four goals in a single match, and the first English player to do so.

Kane scored a hat-trick against Maccabi Haifa in the UEFA Europa League play-off round on 1 October, securing qualification for the group stage. On 4 October, he scored a brace in a 6–1 away win against Manchester United, which is the biggest win for Tottenham at Old Trafford and their best result against United since a home win in 1932. He scored his 200th goal for Tottenham in his 300th appearance for the club in the 3–1 win over Ludogorets Razgrad in the group stage of the Europa League. Kane scored in Tottenham's 2–0 victory over rivals Arsenal making him the record highest goalscorer in the history of the North London Derby with 11 goals. It was also Kane's 100th home goal for Tottenham in all competitions, and his 250th career goal for club and country.

On 2 January 2021, Kane converted a penalty to open the scoring and later provided an assist during Tottenham's 3–0 home victory over Leeds United. This brought both Kane's goal and assist tally in the league to 10, making him the first player in Europe's top five leagues to reach double digits for goals and assists in the 2020–21 season. On 7 March, he scored a brace against Crystal Palace in a 4–1 win; the last goal was assisted by Son Heung-min, and this, their 14th combined goal effort whereby one assisted another, set a record for the most goal combinations in a Premier League season. On 23 May, he scored a goal in a 4–2 win over Leicester City, to reach his 23rd goal of the season and to win the third Golden Boot award in his career. He also won the Premier League Playmaker of the Season award for most assists in a season, becoming the first player to win both the Golden Boot and Playmaker awards in the same season since the introduction of the playmakers' award in 2018.

==== 2021–2022: Desire to leave Tottenham ====
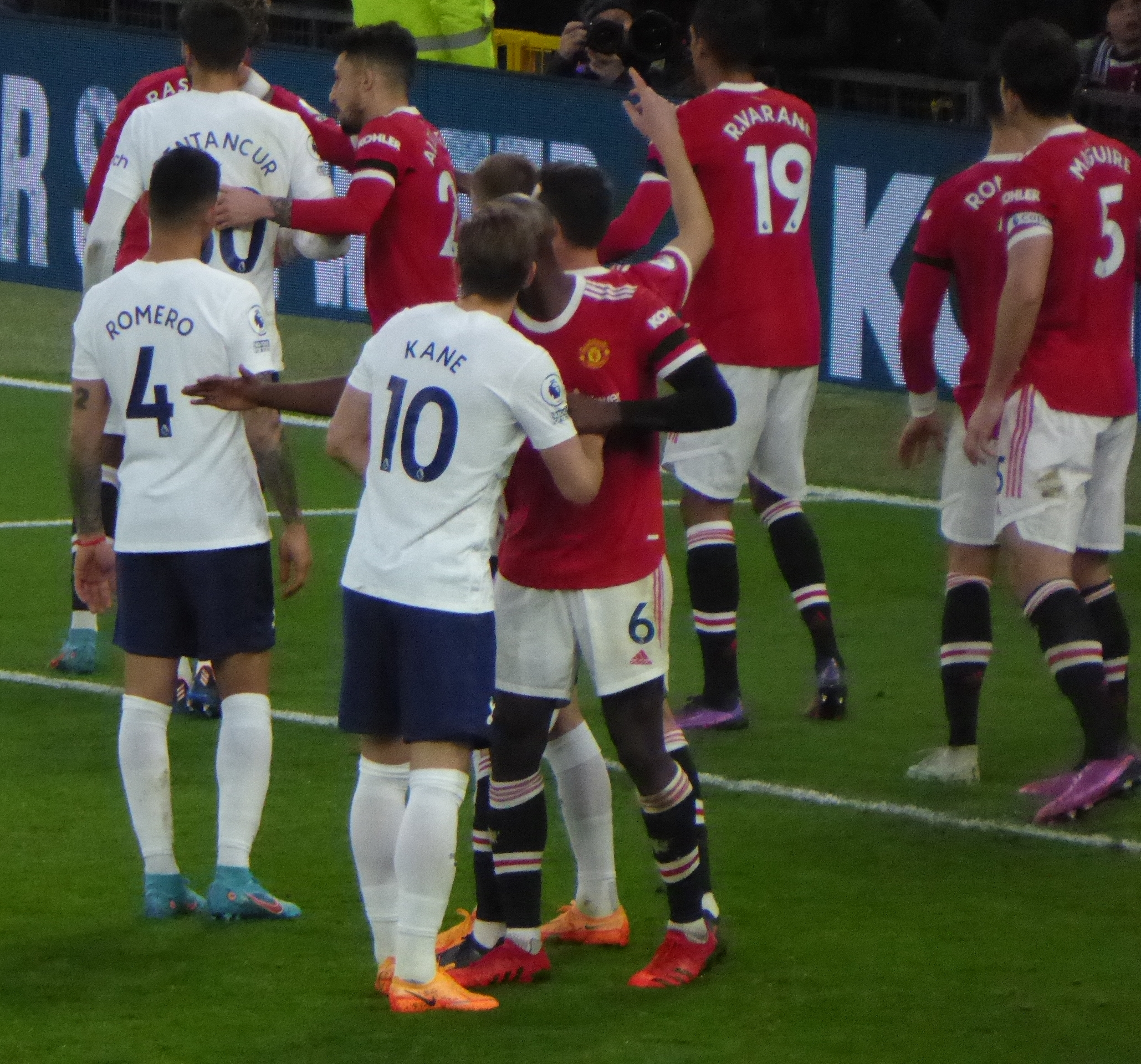
Kane (number 10) playing for Tottenham Hotspur in 2022

The 2021–22 season was preceded by a dispute over a desire by Kane to leave Tottenham, saying he had a gentlemen's agreement with chairman Daniel Levy that would allow him to leave in the summer. The agreement was not honoured, and Levy rejected the interest expressed by Manchester City for Kane's services, including a £127 million transfer bid. Kane failed to turn up for pre-season training and did not play the first two games of the season. He made his season bow on 22 August as a substitute against Wolverhampton Wanderers – his first appearance since returning late for pre-season. Kane announced his desire to stay at Tottenham on 25 August after the move to Manchester City failed to materialise, with Kane stating: "I will be staying at Tottenham this summer and will be 100 per cent focused on helping the team achieve success." The following day Kane made his first appearance in the UEFA Europa Conference League, against Paços de Ferreira. He scored twice in a 3–0 win to secure the team's progress to the group stage. On 30 September, in the second match of the group stage, he scored a hat-trick in 20 minutes against Mura after coming on as a substitute to win 5–1. This was the first hat-trick ever scored in the Europa Conference League, and made Kane the first player to score a hat-trick in all three current major UEFA club competitions (the Champions League, Europa League, and Europa Conference League).

On 17 October 2021, Kane scored his first Premier League goal of the season in a 3–2 away win against Newcastle United. His second goal of the season came on 19 December, when he scored the opener in a 2–2 home draw against Liverpool. On 19 February 2022, Kane scored twice, including a 95th-minute winner, in a thrilling 3–2 victory over Manchester City. This ended City's 15-game unbeaten streak in the league. On 26 February, Kane scored against Leeds United, and assisted Son; the assist was the 37th time Kane and Son had combined to score, setting a new record of goal-scoring partnerships in the Premier League. On 16 March, Kane scored in a 2–0 win away at Brighton, bringing his Premier League away goal tally to 95, surpassing Wayne Rooney's record for most Premier League goals scored away from home.

==== 2022–2023: All-time Tottenham top goalscorer and final season ====
Kane scored his first goal of the season in the London derby away at Chelsea, rescuing a point for Tottenham by scoring in the sixth minute of injury time to bring the score to 2–2. This took his tally of Premier League goals scored for Tottenham to 184, equalling Sergio Agüero's record of most goals scored for a single Premier League club. Kane broke the record the following game when he scored the only goal in the game against Wolverhampton Wanderers, becoming the first player to score 185 goals in the Premier League for a single club. On 5 February 2023, Tottenham stated that Kane had become their all-time top scorer, overtaking Jimmy Greaves with his 267th goal for Tottenham and 200th in the Premier League, in a 1–0 home victory against Manchester City. This fact was disputed, however, as Tottenham do not count the two goals Greaves scored in the 1962 FA Charity Shield, which would put him on 268. On 11 March 2023, Kane scored his 269th and 270th goals with a brace in a 3–1 victory against Nottingham Forest giving him the now undisputed record. In 2023, he finished second to Erling Haaland, with 30 goals, becoming the first player to score 30 times in two separate 38-game Premier League seasons.

Following the departure of Karim Benzema from Real Madrid on 6 June 2023, manager Carlo Ancelotti, who was interested in signing Kane, reportedly asked his board to initiate a possible transfer. In late June 2023, Bayern Munich made an initial bid for Kane of £70 million with one year left in his contract, which was rejected. In July, he was included in Tottenham's squad for their pre-season tour, with Bayern Munich honorary president Uli Hoeneß saying that there had been talks between the club and the player's advisors, stating that Kane had "clearly signalled in all conversations" that he wished to transfer to Bayern Munich. On 6 August, Kane scored four goals as Tottenham beat Shakhtar Donetsk 5–1 in their penultimate pre-season friendly before the start of the Premier League. On the next day, Tottenham rejected another bid from Bayern Munich, for a reported fee of £86 million. On 10 August, it was reported that Bayern Munich and Tottenham had agreed a deal in principle for Kane which was worth more than €100 million (£86.4m). His departure was later confirmed by manager Ange Postecoglou via press conference. The same day, it was reported that Kane was to undergo a medical at Bayern Munich after being given permission to travel to Germany by Tottenham. On 12 August, Kane posted a farewell video on Instagram, thanking Tottenham staff and supporters for his time at the club. Tottenham released an official statement shortly after thanking Kane for his service. Tottenham chairman Daniel Levy also mentioned that Kane wanted a new challenge and decided not to sign a new contract with the club.

=== Bayern Munich ===
==== 2023–2024: Debut season and first European Golden Shoe ====
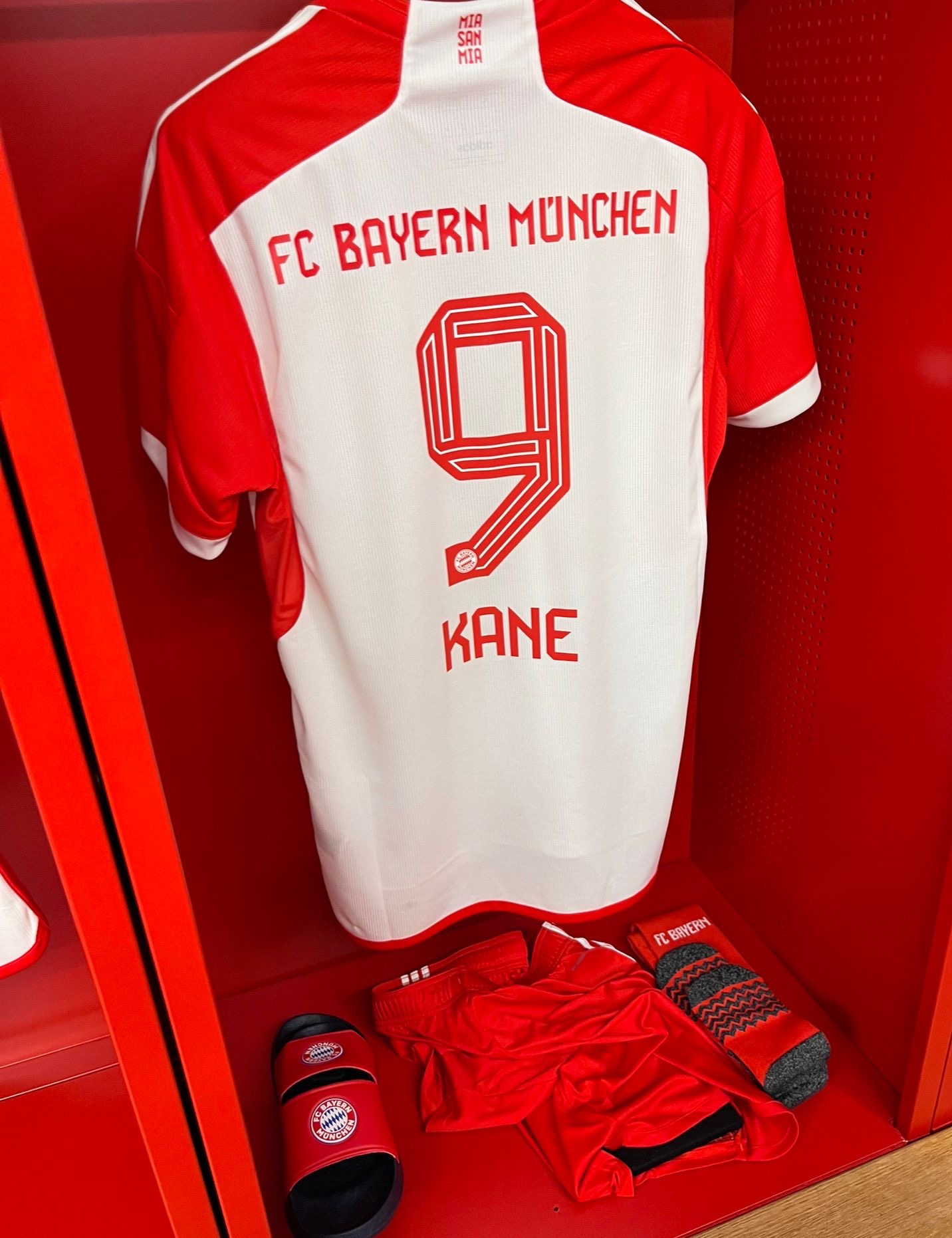
Kane's number 9 home jersey for the 2023–2024 season

After Bayern Munich and Tottenham agreed on a deal on 10 August 2023, Kane agreed personal terms and flew to Munich the next day. On 12 August, Bayern Munich announced the signing of Kane on a four-year contract. Kane became the most expensive signing in Bundesliga history, costing €100 million plus €10 million bonuses in transfer fees, surpassing the €80 million transfer fee paid by Bayern Munich for Lucas Hernandez in 2019.

He made his debut for Bayern on the same day he joined the club, as a 64th-minute substitute in a 3–0 defeat to RB Leipzig in the 2023 DFL-Supercup. He scored his first goal for the club on the opening day of the 2023–24 Bundesliga season, also providing the assist for Leroy Sané's early opener, as Bayern won 4–0 away to Werder Bremen. On 27 August, Kane netted his first Bayern brace in a 3–1 home league victory against FC Augsburg. On 15 September, Kane scored his 300th career club goal as Bayern's home league match against Bayer Leverkusen ended in a 2–2 draw. On 20 September, he scored his first Champions League goal for Bayern on his European debut, converting a penalty in a 4–3 win over Manchester United. On 23 September, Kane got his first hat-trick for Bayern as well as two assists in a 7–0 victory against VfL Bochum, taking his league goal tally to seven and setting a new club record for most goals by a player in his first five Bundesliga appearances. The hat-trick was also his first domestic league triple since December 2017. On 28 October, Kane scored a second-half hat-trick and got an assist in an 8–0 victory over Darmstadt 98, including a goal from inside his own half.

On 4 November 2023, Kane scored his third and back-to-back hat-trick of the season on his Der Klassiker debut, which ended in a 4–0 away win against Borussia Dortmund. With 20 goal participations and 15 goals in 10 games he broke three Bundesliga records, and matched Gerd Müller's record from the 1968–69 Bundesliga season. Four days later, he netted a double in a 2–1 victory against Galatasaray, which secured his club's qualification to the Champions League knockout stages on top of their group. With a brace against FC Heidenheim, he became the first player to score 17 goals after 11 games of a Bundesliga season. With his 18th league goal in a victory over FC Köln on 24 November, he became the top scoring Englishman in a single season in Bundesliga history, surpassing Kevin Keegan and Jadon Sancho.

With his 22nd league goal in a victory over TSG Hoffenheim on 12 January 2024, he matched Robert Lewandowski's record for most goals in the first half of the season. On 3 February, he netted a goal in 3–1 victory against Borussia Mönchengladbach, matching Luca Toni's record of 24 goals for Bayern on his debut season in 2007–08, and on 18 February, he surpassed that with a goal in a 3–2 loss to Bochum. On 9 March, Kane achieved his fourth hat-trick of the regular season and first of the year in an 8–1 rout of Mainz 05. This performance made him the first debut player to score at least twice in eight different games. On 16 March, Kane set a new personal best in league goalscoring during a match against Darmstadt 98, contributing one goal in a 5–2 victory, bringing his league total for the season to 31. This match also saw Kane breaking Uwe Seeler's record of 30 goals scored in a Bundesliga debut season.

On 3 May 2024, Kane was announced as part of the Bundesliga Team of the Season, marking his seventh official seasonal team award and first time spanning multiple leagues. His 36 goals in his debut Bundesliga season, earned him the European Golden Shoe, becoming the second English player to achieve this feat after Kevin Phillips. In addition, he concluded the season as the Champions League top scorer with eight goals, along with Kylian Mbappé. He was also named in the Team of the Season in that competition.

==== 2024–2025: First major title and Bundesliga Player of the Season ====
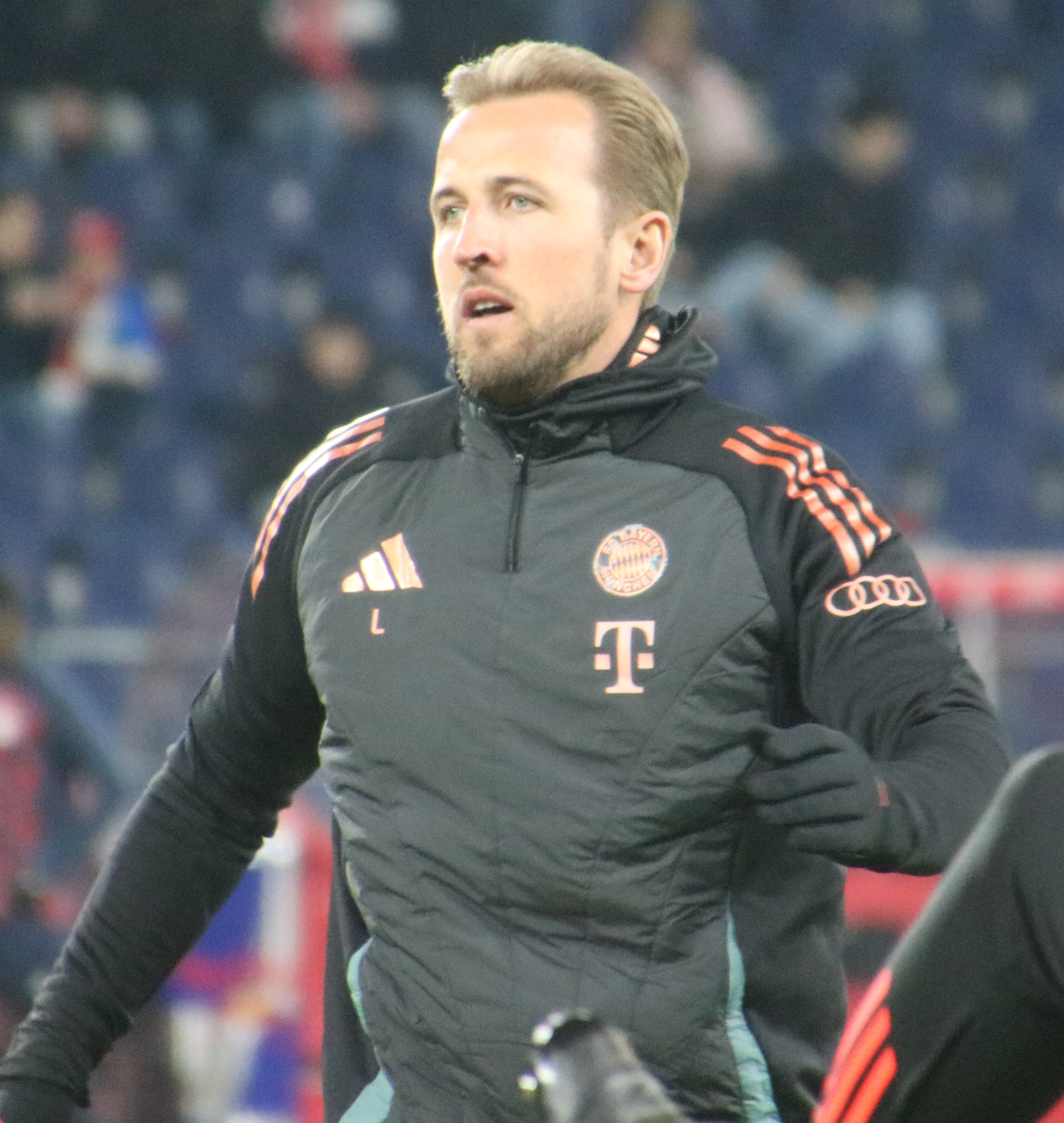
Kane training with Bayern Munich in January 2025

On 16 August 2024, Kane scored his first goal of the season in the first match of Bayern Munich's competitive campaign in a 4–0 DFB-Pokal victory over SSV Ulm 1846. On 1 September, Kane scored his first regular season goal of the season when he converted penalty kick in a 2–0 victory over SC Freiburg. On 14 September, Kane scored his first hat-trick of the campaign with the help of a penalty in a 6–1 victory over newly promoted Holstein Kiel, which also meant that he has scored at least one goal against every Bundesliga side he has faced. Three days later, Kane recorded a second consecutive hat-trick when he netted four times past Dinamo Zagreb with the help of three penalties in a 9–2 victory in the first match of Bayern Munich's Champions League campaign. With 33 goals, he became the highest-scoring Englishman in the Champions League, beating the previous record of 30 by Wayne Rooney. On 21 September, Kane scored in a 5–0 win over Werder Bremen, overtaking Jadon Sancho to become the highest-scoring Englishman in the Bundesliga. On 22 November, Kane scored a hat-trick against FC Augsburg to become the fastest player to reach 50 goals in the Bundesliga. He scored 50 goals in 43 Bundesliga games, overtaking Erling Haaland's record of 50 in 50. His next Bundesliga record was scoring 55 goals in 50 games after he netted twice against Holstein Kiel in a 4–3 win.

On 4 May 2025, Kane won his first major honour, the 2024–25 Bundesliga title, where following a draw against RB Leipzig the previous day (Kane was unable to partake in that match due to a suspension because of an accumulation of yellow cards), Bayer Leverkusen could only manage a draw against SC Freiburg, mathematically crowning Bayern champions with two games to spare. On 11 May, Kane lifted the first trophy of his career as Bayern Munich celebrated their Bundesliga title success. Kane finished the season as the top scorer for the second consecutive season and was named the Bundesliga Player of the Season recognising his continued outstanding performances with Bayern Munich.

==== 2025–2026: Domestic treble, goalscoring records and Ballon d'Or ====
On 16 August 2025, Kane achieved his second career title, scoring a goal in a 2–1 victory over VfB Stuttgart in the Franz Beckenbauer Supercup. Six days later in the opening game of the 2025–26 Bundesliga season, he scored a second-half hat-trick against RB Leipzig. In the league phase of the 2025–26 UEFA Champions League, Kane scored twice against Chelsea to help win the game 3–1, and overtake David Beckham to became the Englishman with the most goals and assists combined in the Champions League, and only the third player (after Cristiano Ronaldo and Neymar) to have scored 20 or more goals for two different clubs in the Champions League. On 26 September, Kane scored twice in a 4–0 victory over Werder Bremen, and became the fastest player to reach 100 goals for any club in one of Europe's top 5 leagues in the 21st century, having done so in 104 games, beating the previous record reached in 105 games by Cristiano Ronaldo and Erling Haaland. A month later, on 18 October, he scored his 400th career club goal in a 2–1 victory over Borussia Dortmund. On 29 October, Kane scored twice against 1. FC Köln in the German Cup and helped the club win 4–1; this was the 14th straight victory for the club, the best start for any club in Europe's top five leagues. Later that year, on 6 December, he scored his 10th Bundesliga hat-trick in a 5–0 away victory against Stuttgart, setting the record after just 76 matches. On 14 December, he scored from the penalty spot in a 2–2 draw against Mainz 05, reaching 474 career goals and surpassing the previous record held by Jimmy Greaves to become the highest-scoring English player in history. A week later, on 21 December, he reached his 100th Bundesliga goal contribution, comprising 81 goals and 19 assists, by scoring a stoppage-time goal in a 4–0 away victory over Heidenheim, achieving the milestone in 78 matches and surpassing the previous record of Roy Makaay (113 appearances).

On 14 February 2026, Kane scored a brace in a 3–0 away win over Werder Bremen, reaching his 500th career goal in 743 appearances, with 100 of those coming from penalties. He scored twice in a 4–1 win against Atalanta on 18 March, reaching the landmark of 50 Champions League goals in 66 games. On 7 April, he scored in a 2–1 away win over Real Madrid at the Bernabéu, securing his club's first victory at the ground since May 2001 and their first win over the opposition since April 2012. Kane also scored an equaliser in the return leg the following week to take him to 50 goals for the season, the first time he had ever done so. He also reached his 12th goal in the competition, surpassing his previous record, in a 4–3 victory, as his side qualified to the semi-finals with a 6–4 aggregate win. On 19 April, he scored in a 4–2 win over Stuttgart as his club secured their 35th Bundesliga title and it would also be his second major trophy. On 28 April, he scored in his sixth consecutive Champions League match during a 5–4 defeat to Paris Saint-Germain, becoming the first English player to reach this milestone and surpassing Steven Gerrard's previous record. In addition, he moved into Bayern's all-time top ten scorers, equalling Giovane Élber's tally of 139 goals. A week later, on 6 May, he scored a stoppage-time equaliser in a 1–1 draw against Paris Saint-Germain, but his team was eliminated after losing the tie 6–5 on aggregate. Hence, he scored in six consecutive knockout-stage matches, equalling a record set by Cristiano Ronaldo between 2012 and 2013. However, he reached his 55th goal of the season for the club, matching Robert Lewandowski's record in 2019–20. On 16 May, he scored a hat-trick in a 5–1 win over FC Köln, equalling his Bundesliga record of 36 goals, securing the top scorer award for a third consecutive season.

On 23 May, Kane scored a hat-trick in Bayern's 3–0 victory over VfB Stuttgart in the DFB-Pokal final, setting a new club record for the 21st century with 61 goals in all competitions. He became the fourth player to score a hat-trick in a DFB-Pokal final, after Uwe Seeler, Roland Wohlfarth and Robert Lewandowski, and also joined Dieter Müller and Dirk Kurtenbach as one of the few players to score in every round of the competition. He ultimately secured his second European Golden Shoe trophy, and became the first English player to score more than 60 goals in a single season since Dixie Dean in 1927–28.

On 26 October 2026, Kane received the Ballon d'Or at the London Palladium, becoming the first Englishman to win the award since Michael Owen in 2001 and the first Bayern player since Karl-Heinz Rummenigge in 1981. He also won his second Gerd Müller Trophy for Men's Striker of the Year.

==== 2026–2027: 100 Bundesliga goals, contract extension and ankle injury ====
On 18 September 2026, Kane scored twice in Bayern's 7–0 demolition of Union Berlin. In doing so, he became the fastest player to reach 100 Bundesliga goals, achieving the feat in 98 games, 31 fewer than the previous record of Dieter Müller who achieved it in 129 games. On 5 November, Kane signed a new three-year contract with Bayern worth €27 million a year, running until 2029.

On 20 November 2026, Kane suffered syndesmosis ligament tear to his left ankle against 1. FC Köln in the Bundesliga and underwent surgery to repair the tear.

== International career ==
=== 2010–2015: Youth level ===
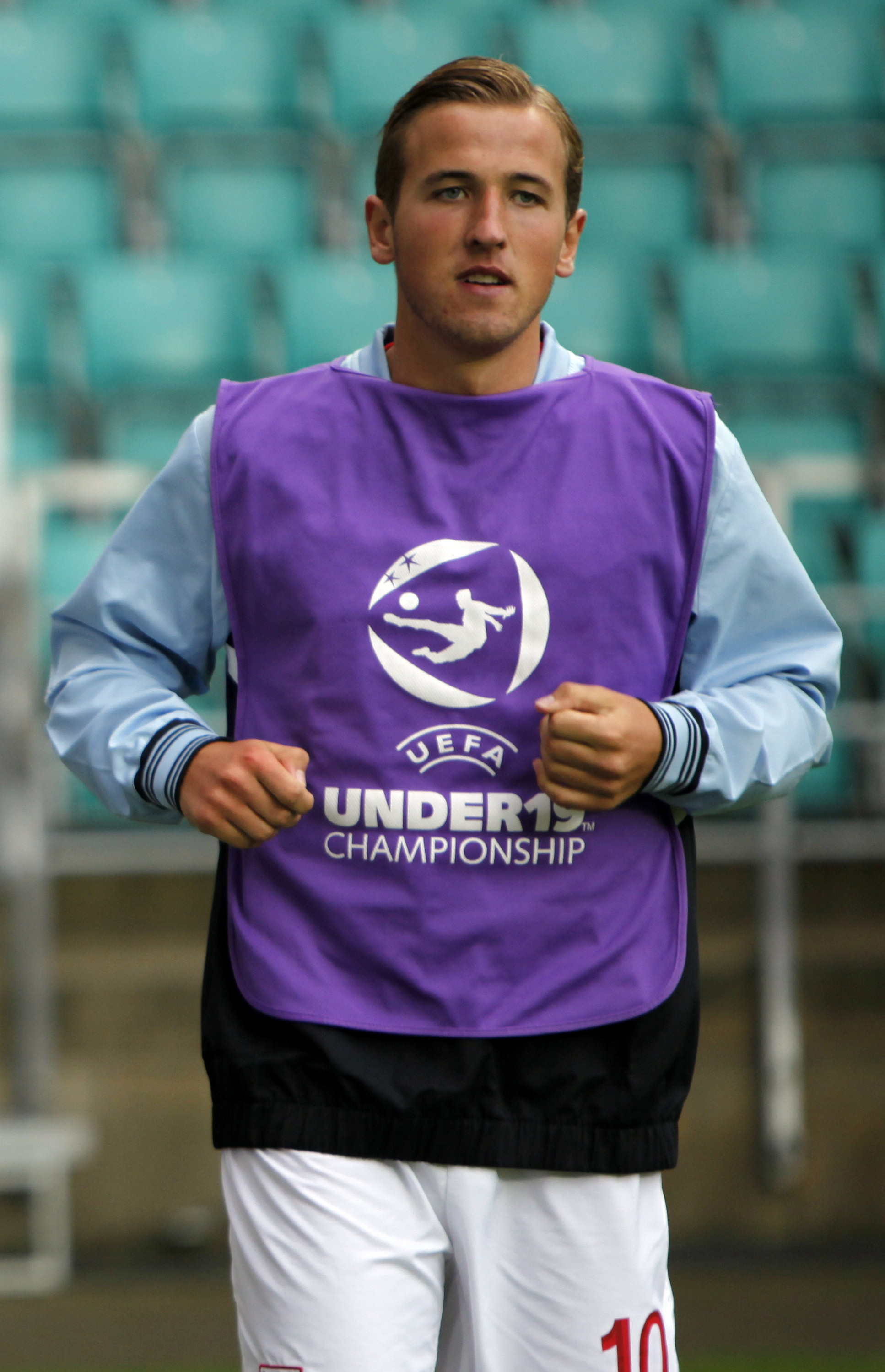
Kane training with England U19 at the 2012 UEFA European Under-19 Championship

In January 2010, Kane was called up to play for the England under-17 team for the Algarve Tournament in Portugal. Kane missed the 2010 UEFA European Under-17 Championship due to illness, with England going on to win the tournament in his absence. He scored two goals in six appearances in total at under-17 level. He later moved up to the under-19s and scored twice in a 6–1 victory over Albania on 8 October 2010. Kane played a large role in the England under-19s progression to the semi-finals of the 2012 UEFA European Under-19 Championship in Estonia. Kane scored the winner against France in the final group stage match to ensure the team a safe passage through to the semi-finals. In total, Kane appeared 14 times for the England under-19 team and contributed six goals during that period.

On 28 May 2013, he was named in manager Peter Taylor's 21-man squad for the 2013 FIFA U-20 World Cup. He made his debut on 23 June in the opening group-stage match, a 2–2 draw against Iraq, in which he assisted Luke Williams' goal. Kane then scored in the following match against Chile, collecting a pass after work by Ross Barkley and shooting from the edge of the penalty area. On 13 August, Kane made his debut for the under-21s against Scotland. In that match, he came on as a substitute in the 58th minute, and England won 6–0. On 10 October, he scored a hat-trick for England against San Marino in 2015 UEFA European Under-21 Championship qualification.

Kane was named in the England under-21 squad for the 2015 UEFA European Under-21 Championship in the Czech Republic, despite opposition from his club manager Mauricio Pochettino. He played every minute of England's campaign at the tournament, which ended with them eliminated in last place in their group.

=== 2015–2018: Senior debut and first major tournaments ===
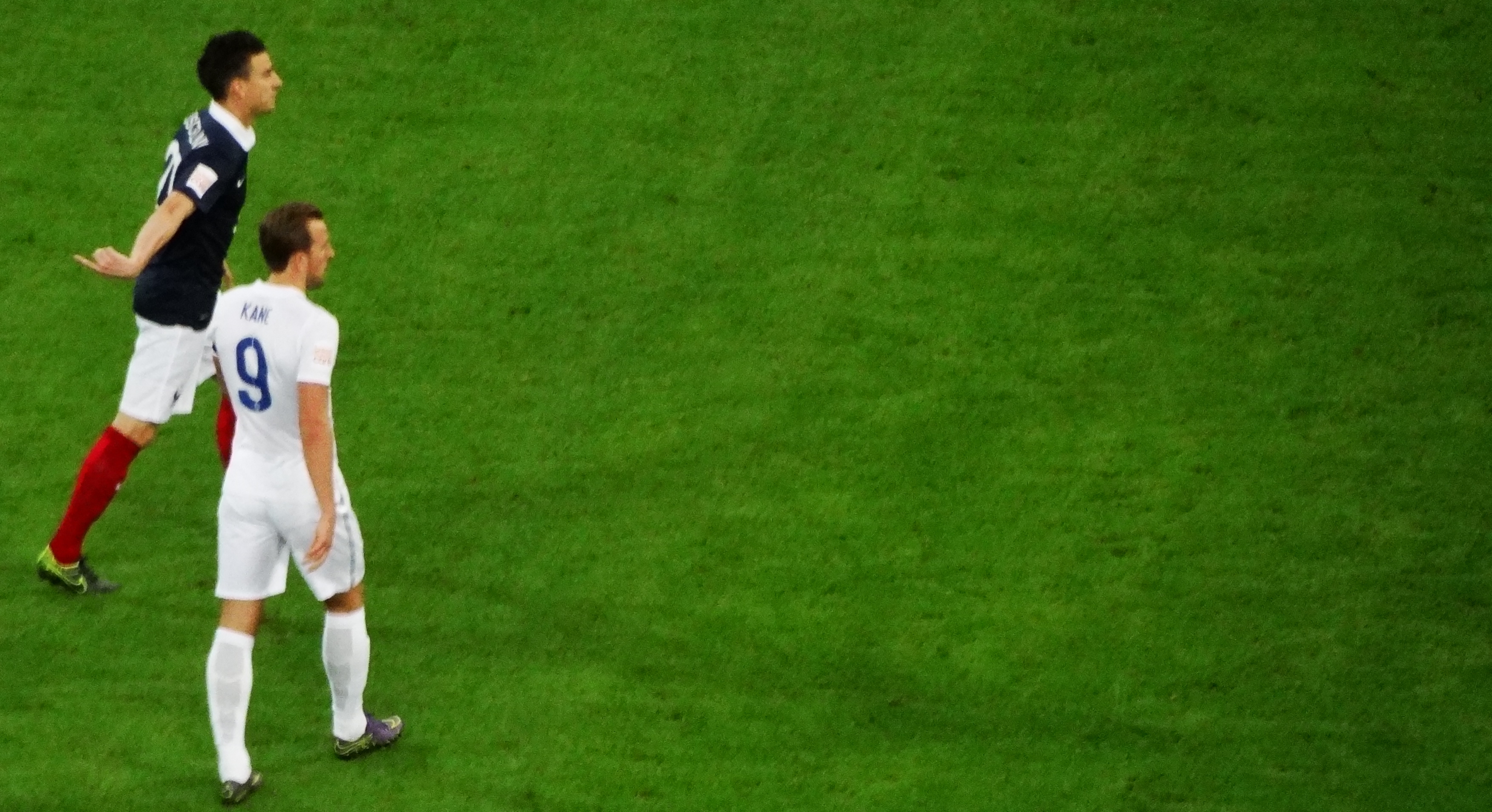
Kane (in white) playing for England against France in 2015

Kane was also eligible for the Republic of Ireland through his father, who was born in Galway, but in August 2014 he ruled out switching allegiance, saying that he wanted to break into the England senior team.

After a good run of form with Tottenham and being the third top goalscorer in the Premier League with 16 goals, on 19 March 2015, Kane was named by manager Roy Hodgson in the England squad to face Lithuania in a UEFA Euro 2016 qualifying match and Italy in a friendly. He made his international debut at Wembley Stadium, replacing Wayne Rooney in the second half against Lithuania, and scored just 80 seconds later with a header from a Raheem Sterling cross. On 30 March 2015, the day before the Italy match, Hodgson announced that Kane would start alongside Rooney, and he played the full 90 minutes of the 1–1 draw at Juventus Stadium.

In his next appearance on 5 September 2015, substitute Kane scored the fifth of England's six goals in a win over San Marino which qualified them for UEFA Euro 2016. Kane scored his third England goal against Switzerland in another qualifier three days later, which they won 2–0. On 12 October, as England finished their qualification campaign with a tenth win from ten matches, Kane's shot hit the post for an own goal by Lithuanian goalkeeper Giedrius Arlauskis in a 3–0 away victory.

On 22 May 2016, Kane opened the scoring in a 2–1 friendly win over Turkey at the City of Manchester Stadium, but later missed a penalty. He was the first England player to fail to score from the penalty spot during a game since Frank Lampard in 2010, and the first to miss the target since Peter Crouch in 2006. At the European Championship in France that June, Kane was assigned to take corner kicks, a tactic which was criticised by pundits, but defended by Hodgson, who said that Kane was the best for the role. He failed to score at the tournament as England were eliminated by Iceland at the round of 16.

On 10 June 2017, Kane captained England for the first time in their 2018 FIFA World Cup qualifier with Scotland at Hampden Park, scoring an added-time equaliser to rescue a 2–2 draw. On 5 October, he scored an added-time winner against Slovenia which confirmed England's qualification to the 2018 FIFA World Cup.

=== 2018–2020: Captaincy and FIFA World Cup Golden Boot ===
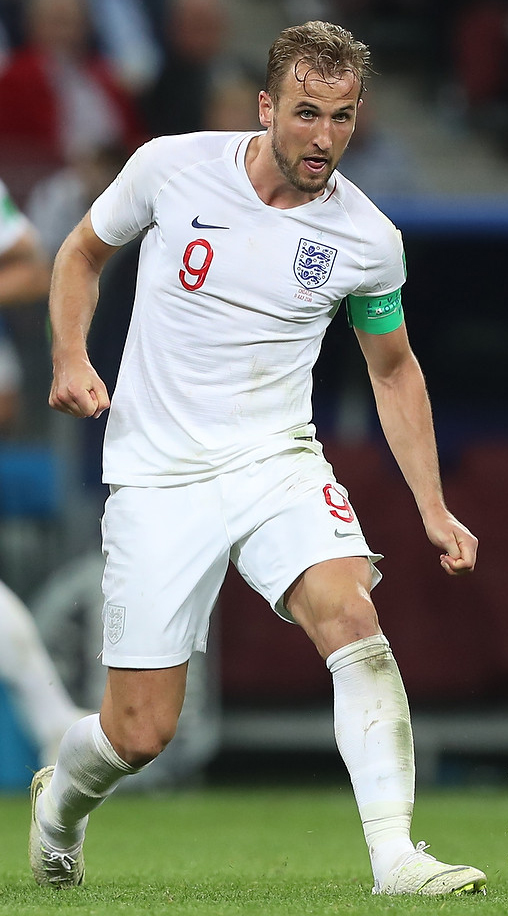
Kane playing for England at the 2018 FIFA World Cup

Kane was named in the 23-man England squad for the 2018 FIFA World Cup and was named captain. On 18 June, Kane scored both of England's goals in a 2–1 win over Tunisia, his winning goal coming deep in injury time, in the team's opening group game of the World Cup. In the next group game on 24 June, Kane scored a hat-trick in England's 6–1 win over Panama, which was England's biggest ever World Cup victory. With his three goals against Panama, Kane became the third England player to score a hat-trick in a World Cup match, after Geoff Hurst against West Germany in the 1966 final and Gary Lineker against Poland in 1986.

Kane scored his sixth goal of the finals from a penalty kick in England's round of 16 tie with Colombia. He also scored the team's first kick of the penalty shoot-out as England prevailed 4–3; this was the first time that England had managed to win a penalty shoot-out at the World Cup. Kane didn't score again for the rest of the tournament as England finished in fourth place after losing 2–0 Belgium in the third-place playoff. However, his six goals in the tournament earned him the Golden Boot as the top goalscorer of the World Cup, the first England player to win the award since Gary Lineker became the first to do so in the 1986 tournament.

The September international break saw the introduction of the UEFA Nations League. England's first match was on 8 September 2018 against Spain, which Kane captained for the full 90 minutes in a game which saw England lose 2–1. On 15 October, England played Spain for the second time in the group, this time running out 3–2 winners with Kane assisting two of the three goals. On 14 November, before a friendly against the United States, Kane presented Wayne Rooney with England's Golden Boot in recognition of Rooney's 53 England goals, a record that, at the time, made him England's all-time top goalscorer. In an interview following the match, which ended in a 3–0 win for England, Rooney revealed that he wanted Kane to present him the award, correctly predicting that Kane overtake him as all-time top goalscorer. Three days after the United States match, Kane captained England in their final Nations League group match against Croatia as the Three Lions won 2–1. Kane first assisted Jesse Lingard's equaliser then scored the winning goal which saw England top the group and qualify for the Nations League Finals in June 2019.

=== 2021–2024: Euro finals and all-time England top scorer ===
In the qualifying phase of UEFA Euro 2020, Kane captained the 1,000th match played by England, and scored a hat-trick against Montenegro. This brought his tally to 31, which placed him sixth in the all-time list of England's top goalscorers and also made him the highest-ever scoring England captain. The 7–0 win also secured England's qualification to UEFA Euro 2020. Kane was in fine form throughout the qualifying process, becoming the first Englishman to score in every game in a qualifying campaign, registering twelve goals – the joint-highest for an England player in a single year.

In the Euro 2020 round of 16 match on 29 June 2021, Kane scored the second goal against Germany. This was his first goal of the tournament in a 2–0 victory for England. He scored a further two goals in the quarter-finals match against Ukraine on 3 July. In the semi-final against Denmark, Kane scored the winning goal in a 2–1 triumph that secured England's place in the Euro 2020 final, the country's first final in a major competition since 1966, which they subsequently lost to Italy in a penalty shootout after a 1–1 draw in regular time on 11 July. In the unsuccessful shootout, Kane did convert his penalty but England ultimately lost 3–2.

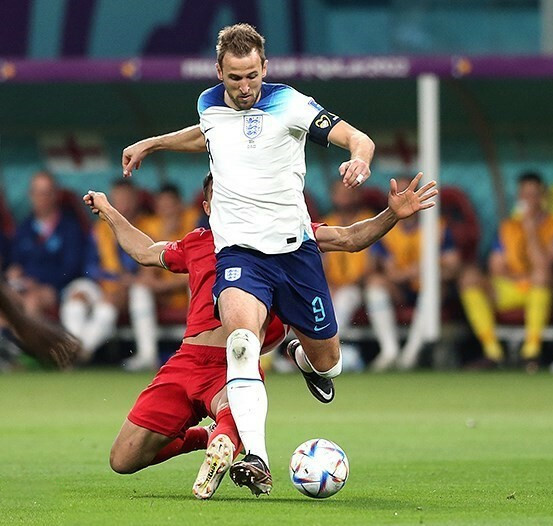
Kane preparing to shoot for England at the 2022 FIFA World Cup

In the last two 2022 FIFA World Cup qualifiers against Albania and San Marino, Kane scored back-to-back first-half hat-tricks (including a "perfect hat-trick" against the former and four goals against the latter) to help secure England's qualification to the tournament in Qatar. In June 2022, in the league phase of the 2022–23 UEFA Nations League, Kane scored his 50th international goal in the game against Germany, making him only the second player to score 50 goals for England, only three goals behind Wayne Rooney in the all-time England top-scorer list. At the 2022 FIFA World Cup, Kane scored twice, enough to equal Rooney's all-time top-scoring record, as England reached the quarter-finals; however they were eliminated by France after he missed a penalty in their 2–1 defeat.

On 23 March 2023, he scored a penalty in a UEFA Euro 2024 qualifier to help England win 2–1 over reigning European champions Italy, which was also England's first away win against Italy since 1961. This goal, his 54th for England, overtook Rooney's record and made Kane England's all-time record goalscorer. Kane achieved this feat with 39 fewer games than Rooney, with a score rate of 0.7 goals per game, higher than most of England's recent top goalscorers. On 17 October, he scored a brace in a 3–1 win against Italy in the second leg of the Euro 2024 qualifier, which was England's first win against their opponent at Wembley Stadium since 1977.

=== 2024–present: Second Euro finals and third World Cup ===
In June 2024, Kane was named in England's 26-man squad for UEFA Euro 2024. He captained England to a 1–0 win over Serbia in their opening Group C match on 16 June, overtaking Gary Neville as England's outright most capped player at European Championships with his 12th Euros appearance. It was also his 23rd appearance at a major tournament, giving him the outright record ahead of Ashley Cole and Raheem Sterling. On 20 June, in the second group match against Denmark, he scored his first goal of the tournament. Kane scored the winning goal of England's round of 16 win over Slovakia with a header in the first minute of extra time. This match was his 79th appearance for England in a competitive match, breaking the record of Peter Shilton. Kane scored the equaliser against the Netherlands, with a penalty in the first half of the semi-final. He started for England in the final against Spain, but was substituted in the 61st minute, as England lost the final 2–1. With three goals in the tournament, Kane was awarded the Golden Boot in a six-way tie. He became the third player ever to win the award at both the Euros and World Cup, after Valentin Ivanov and Dražan Jerković.

Having won his 100th cap for the senior national team with a tally of 66 goals scored in 99 games, Kane made his centennial appearance for England on 10 September 2024 in a 2–0 home win against Finland in the Nations League, scoring both goals. On 14 October 2025, he scored a brace in a 5–0 away win over Latvia, securing his nation's qualification to the World Cup. He finished the 2026 World Cup qualification campaign as his nation's top scorer with eight goals.

Kane with England at the 2026 FIFA World Cup

On 22 May 2026, Kane was selected in the 26-man squad for the 2026 FIFA World Cup. He scored a brace in England's opening match, a 4–2 win over Croatia, equalling the England's all-time top scorer record of 10 goals set by Gary Lineker and becoming just the second English player to score at three different World Cups after David Beckham. His first goal came from the penalty spot, marking his fifth World Cup penalty goal and setting a new international record in that category. Following the game, he was named player of the match. On 27 June, he scored his 11th World Cup goal for England in a 2–0 victory over Panama, surpassing Gary Lineker's record. In addition, he reached his 70th goal of the 2025–26 season for club and country, making it the second-highest total ever in a single campaign, behind only Lionel Messi's 82-goal tally in the 2011–12 season. On 1 July, he scored a brace and was named Man of the Match in England's first knockout match of the tournament against DR Congo, in a 2–1 win, both of which were assisted by Anthony Gordon. On 5 July, Kane scored a penalty and conceded another in the round of 16, in addition to setting-up Jude Bellingham's second goal, leading England to a 3–2 victory over host nation Mexico, advancing England to the quarterfinals. He also drew level with Gary Lineker's England record of six goals in World Cup knockout-stage matches. In the 2–1 defeat against Argentina in the semi-final, he made his 121st international appearance, becoming England's most capped outfield player, with only goalkeeper Peter Shilton having earned more caps overall. He was an unused substitute in England's 6–4 victory over France in the bronze medal match, securing their highest finish in the tournament in 60 years.

On 6 October 2026, by making his 125th appearance for the national team, he equalled Peter Shilton's England cap record. He became England's most-capped player with 126 appearances for the national team on 12 November 2026, and scored a goal against Croatia to secure a place in the quarter-finals of the UEFA Nations League.

== Player profile ==
=== Development ===
Kane's former youth coach Alex Inglethorpe has said of him:

When he first came into the under-18s as a 15 year old, he stood out in the sense he looked a bit gangly. He moved slightly awkwardly, he was a bit cumbersome. But look closer, he had a lot of ability, a great technique. I think he surprised people how good he was. Tactically he was very flexible. He often played in midfield. I remember seeing him once playing as a holding midfielder.

As a teenager, Kane initially struggled in Tottenham's academy, partially due to his date of birth in July and the so-called Relative Age Effect, he was not as physically developed as other players, nor was he as quick. However, he gained the respect of coaches with his technique and desire for self-improvement.

When profiling Kane in February 2013, Talksport said that he was best as a second striker, despite also having ability as a centre forward or in a wide position. They wrote that he preferred to place his shots, although he could also score from distance. The report also noted that he had good pace, but was weak in the air and had not scored on his loan at Norwich. Initially a back-up to £26 million Spanish import Roberto Soldado and frequently loaned out, Kane was eventually made Tottenham's starting forward by manager Mauricio Pochettino. Under Pochettino, Kane said that his game has improved through the tough training techniques instituted by the manager. He also strives to achieve marginal gain to maximise his potential by tweaking various aspects of his training and preparations as well as nutrition.

=== Reception ===
Former Tottenham manager David Pleat described Kane as an "old-fashioned traditional centre-forward". Clive Allen, who coached him at Tottenham, stated that "one thing I'd say about him, which unfortunately you don't say about a lot of young footballers, is that he had a passion for the game. He loves football, he loves playing, he loves scoring goals". His former Tottenham under-21 coach Les Ferdinand likened Kane's movement to their former forward Teddy Sheringham, and the power and accuracy of his shots to Alan Shearer.

A tall and physical striker, Kane's style of play has been compared to that of former Tottenham forward Jürgen Klinsmann, a comparison Kane called "flattering" in February 2015. In March 2015, Football Association chairman Greg Dyke named Kane as the benchmark for clubs producing young English players. Shearer said that month that the three best strikers playing in the league were Kane, Diego Costa and Sergio Agüero. Although he was initially criticised for his limited aerial game in his early career, as well as his lack of significant pace, he became more prolific with his head as his career progressed.

After Tottenham's victory over Chelsea in January 2015, blogger Chris Miller wrote, "Nobody thought he was the guy who was going to give that performance against Chelsea". In February 2015, BBC Sport wrote that Kane was best as a lone striker, with his "hold-up play and close control" making him apt in other positions as well. Also that month, Match of the Day pundit Danny Murphy said that the England team should be built around Kane, stating, "I'm struggling to see a weakness in the lad's game".

In August 2018, ESPN reporter Michael Cox said that "Kane was initially considered a pure goal scorer, he's actually a good all-round player, often playing as an attacking midfielder", stating that during the 2018 FIFA World Cup "Kane's contributions in deeper positions were outstanding, his back-to-goal work as impressive as ever". Indeed, although Kane is predominantly known for his clinical finishing and prolific goalscoring ability as an out-and-out striker, he is also known for his vision, technique, link-up play, and passing ability, which enables him to drop deep, bring his teammates into play, and create chances for other players; he is therefore also capable of playing in a more creative role as a false 9 or even as a number 10. In 2022, Sam McGuire of Opta Sports identified him as "the most creative number 9 in the world." Additionally, he is also known for his defensive work-rate, and is an accurate penalty taker.

Beginning in 2020, Kane started to be criticised about a perceived tactic of backing into defenders jumping for headers, causing the players to fall backwards onto the pitch, potentially risking serious injury. After doing so to Brighton & Hove Albion player Adam Lallana and winning a penalty, Kane was criticised by former Arsenal player Martin Keown who said, "He looks at his opponent, knows what he is going to do and makes a back for him. I think it is dangerous play from Harry Kane and he knows what he is doing and I don't even think it is a penalty." However, this tactic has been defended by former England defender Gary Cahill who said, "I think that's just part of football. I think an element of that is being clever and experienced and knowing when you can maybe draw a foul in."

Kane was appointed a Member of the Order of the British Empire (MBE) in the 2019 New Year Honours for services to football.

== Media and sponsorship ==
Kane began a boot sponsorship deal with footwear company Skechers in August 2023 after his agreement with sportswear and equipment supplier Nike ended. Following his 100th Premier League goal in February 2018 Nike launched the special-edition Hypervenom 3 HK. In 2018 he featured in a Nike commercial, "Nothing Beats a Londoner", along with other sports stars based in the city, including quadruple Olympic champion Mo Farah and Chelsea playmaker Eden Hazard, highlighting London's diversity. Ahead of UEFA Euro 2016, Kane featured in advertisements for Mars Bars and Beats by Dr. Dre headphones, the latter alongside Antoine Griezmann, Mario Götze and Cesc Fàbregas.

Kane features in EA Sports' FIFA video game series: he was named to the Team of the Year in FIFA 18, joining Lionel Messi and Cristiano Ronaldo in attack. Kane and Camila Cabello announced the winner of the "Best International Male Solo Artist" award at the 2018 Brit Awards at the O_{2} Arena on 21 February, namely Kendrick Lamar.

On 14 May 2020, Kane announced that he would sponsor Leyton Orient's shirts for the next season to help support the first club he played for professionally through the COVID-19 pandemic. The unusual sponsorship deal, the first of its kind in English football, has the approval of Premier League, English Football League and Football Association, and the sponsorship has been donated to charities which will receive 10% of the proceeds of the respective shirt sales – the home shirt shows a thank you message to the NHS frontline workers tackling the pandemic, the away shirt sporting a logo of Haven House Children's Hospice while the third kit features the mental health charity Mind.

A mural of Kane outside the Tottenham Hotspur Stadium was unveiled in May 2023 in celebration of Kane becoming Tottenham's record goalscorer. Kane and his family left their handprints and signatures on the bottom of the mural. A statue of Kane commissioned by Waltham Forest Council in 2020, though a permanent location was debated for years, leaving the statue in storage until November 2024, when the statue was unveiled at the Peter May Sports Centre in Walthamstow.

== Personal life ==
=== Marriage and family ===
In an interview published in February 2015, Kane stated that he was in a relationship with Katie Goodland, whom he had known since childhood. He told Esquire, "We went to school together, so she's seen my whole career. Of course, she's finding it a little crazy. I think she's even been in the papers a couple of times, taking the dogs out." On 1 July 2017, Kane announced their engagement on his Twitter (now X) account, and said in June 2019 that they had married. Kane and Goodland announced the birth of their first child, a daughter, in January 2017. Their second daughter was born in August 2018. Their first son was born in December 2020, followed by their second son in August 2023. Kane and Goodland have two Labrador retrievers, Brady and Wilson. He named one after former NFL quarterback Tom Brady. In response to a suggestion that the other dog's name was a reference to NFL quarterback Russell Wilson, Kane stated: "My wife actually named the other one Wilson. People just assumed it was for Russell Wilson. But it was just a coincidence." Kane has cited The Brady 6, a documentary about Brady, as an inspiration for his development. In 2019, Kane expressed an interest in becoming a kicker in the NFL "in 10 to 12 years".

=== Health and recreation ===
Kane abstains from alcohol during the football season, and starting from 2017, he hired a full-time chef to optimise his nutrition.

Kane plays golf in his free time. As of 2024, he is a 3 handicap. Kane played golf with then-US president-elect Donald Trump in January 2025, stating: "He invited me to play when I was down in Palm Beach. When the president invites you somewhere, it was a pretty surreal experience just to meet him and to play golf with him."

=== Advocacy ===
On 10 October 2022, Kane launched the Harry Kane Foundation, which "seeks to change perceptions of mental health by normalising conversations and promoting positive habits to end stigma around the subject". To mark the occasion, Kane featured on CBeebies' Bedtime Stories.

== Career statistics ==
=== Club ===
As of match played 20 November 2026

Appearances and goals by club, season and competition
Club	Season	League			National cup (Note: Includes FA Cup, DFB-Pokal)		League cup (Note: Includes Football League/EFL Cup)		Europe		Other		Total	
Club	Season	Division	Apps	Goals	Apps	Goals	Apps	Goals	Apps	Goals	Apps	Goals	Apps	Goals
Tottenham Hotspur	2010–11	Premier League	0	0	—		0	0	0	0	—		0	0
Tottenham Hotspur	2011–12	Premier League	0	0	—		0	0	6 (Note: Appearances in UEFA Europa League)	1	—		6	1
Tottenham Hotspur	2012–13	Premier League	1	0	—		—		0	0	—		1	0
Tottenham Hotspur	2013–14	Premier League	10	3	0	0	2	1	7	0	—		19	4
Tottenham Hotspur	2014–15	Premier League	34	21	2	0	6	3	9	7	—		51	31
Tottenham Hotspur	2015–16	Premier League	38	25	4	1	1	0	7	2	—		50	28
Tottenham Hotspur	2016–17	Premier League	30	29	3	4	0	0	5 (Note: Three appearances and two goals in UEFA Champions League, two appearances in UEFA Europa League)	2	—		38	35
Tottenham Hotspur	2017–18	Premier League	37	30	4	4	0	0	7 (Note: Appearances in UEFA Champions League)	7	—		48	41
Tottenham Hotspur	2018–19	Premier League	28	17	1	1	2	1	9	5	—		40	24
Tottenham Hotspur	2019–20	Premier League	29	18	0	0	0	0	5	6	—		34	24
Tottenham Hotspur	2020–21	Premier League	35	23	2	1	4	1	8	8	—		49	33
Tottenham Hotspur	2021–22	Premier League	37	17	3	3	5	1	5 (Note: Appearances in UEFA Europa Conference League)	6	—		50	27
Tottenham Hotspur	2022–23	Premier League	38	30	2	1	1	0	8	1	—		49	32
Tottenham Hotspur	Total		317	213	21	15	21	7	76	45	—		435	280
Leyton Orient (loan)	2010–11	League One	18	5	0	0	—		—		—		18	5
Millwall (loan)	2011–12	Championship	22	7	5	2	—		—		—		27	9
Norwich City (loan)	2012–13	Premier League	3	0	1	0	1	0	—		—		5	0
Leicester City (loan)	2012–13	Championship	13	2	—		—		—		2 (Note: Appearances in Championship play-offs)	0	15	2
Bayern Munich	2023–24	Bundesliga	32	36	0	0	—		12	8	1 (Note: Appearance in DFL-/Franz Beckenbauer Supercup)	0	45	44
Bayern Munich	2024–25	Bundesliga	31	26	2	1	—		13	11	5 (Note: Appearances in FIFA Club World Cup)	3	51	41
Bayern Munich	2025–26	Bundesliga	31	36	6	10	—		13	14	1	1	51	61
Bayern Munich	2026–27	Bundesliga	10	4	1	2	—		4	4	1	0	16	10
Bayern Munich	Total		104	102	9	13	—		42	37	8	4	163	156
Career total			477	329	36	30	22	7	118	82	10	4	663	452

=== International ===
As of match played 15 November 2026

Appearances and goals by national team and year
National team	Year	Apps	Goals
England	2015	8	3
England	2016	9	2
England	2017	6	7
England	2018	12	8
England	2019	10	12
England	2020	6	0
England	2021	16	16
England	2022	13	5
England	2023	9	9
England	2024	14	7
England	2025	9	9
England	2026	15	15
Total		127	93

== Honours ==
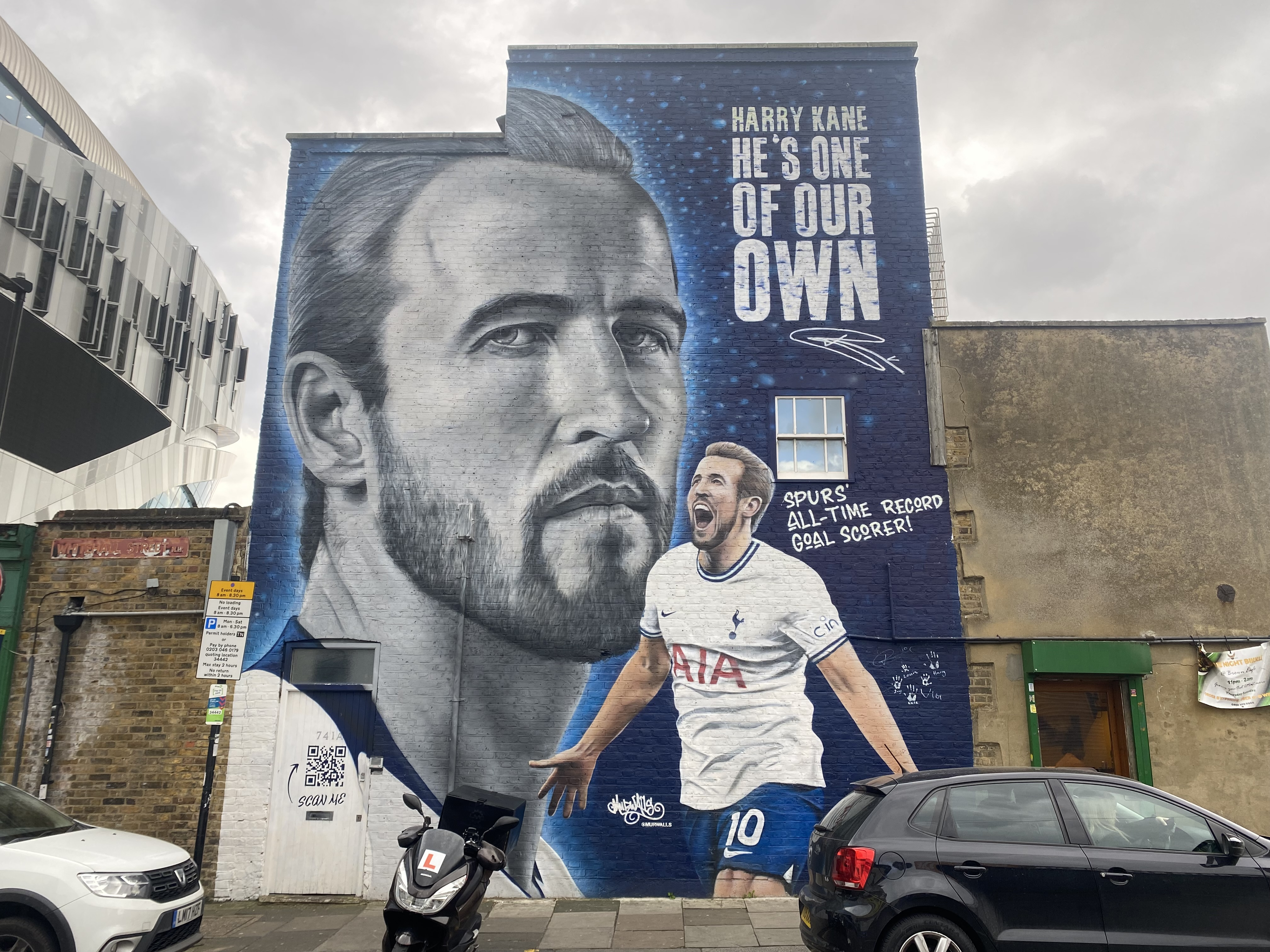
A mural of Kane outside the Tottenham Hotspur Stadium commissioned in celebration of him becoming Tottenham's highest goalscorer

Tottenham Hotspur

- Football League/EFL Cup runner-up: 2014–15, 2020–21
- UEFA Champions League runner-up: 2018–19

Bayern Munich

- Bundesliga: 2024–25, 2025–26
- DFB-Pokal: 2025–26
- Franz Beckenbauer Supercup: 2025, 2026

England

- UEFA European Championship runner-up: 2020, 2024
- FIFA World Cup third place: 2026
- UEFA Nations League third place: 2018–19

Individual

- Ballon d'Or: 2026
- European Golden Shoe: 2023–24, 2025–26
- UEFA Champions League top scorer: 2023–24 (shared)
- UEFA European Championship top scorer: 2024 (shared)
- FIFA World Cup Golden Boot: 2018
- Premier League Golden Boot: 2015–16, 2016–17, 2020–21
- Bundesliga Player of the Season: 2024–25
- Bundesliga top scorer: 2023–24, 2024–25, 2025–26
- DFB-Pokal top scorer: 2025–26
- Millwall Young Player of the Year: 2011–12
- Premier League Player of the Month: January 2015, February 2015, March 2016, February 2017, September 2017, December 2017, March 2022
- PFA Premier League Team of the Year: 2014–15, 2015–16, 2016–17, 2017–18, 2020–21, 2022–23
- PFA Young Player of the Year: 2014–15
- Tottenham Hotspur Player of the Year: 2014–15, 2020–21, 2022–23
- Premier League Playmaker of the Season: 2020–21
- PFA Fans' Player of the Year: 2016–17
- Football Supporters' Federation Player of the Year: 2017
- England Player of the Year Award: 2017, 2018
- FIFA World Cup Dream Team: 2018
- IFFHS World's Best Top Goal Scorer: 2017
- IFFHS World's Best Top Division Goal Scorer: 2023
- IFFHS Men's World Team: 2023,2025
- London Football Awards Premier League Player of the Year: 2018, 2021
- Bundesliga Goal of the Month: October 2023, November 2023, December 2023, February 2024, April 2024
- Bundesliga Player of the Month: October 2024, September 2025, December 2025, February 2026
- Bundesliga Goal of the Season: 2023–24
- Bundesliga Team of the Season: 2023–24, 2024–25, 2025–26
- VDV Bundesliga Team of the Season: 2023–24, 2024–25, 2025–26
- kicker Bundesliga Team of the Season: 2023–24, 2024–25, 2025–26
- UEFA Champions League Team of the Season: 2023–24, 2025–26
- ESM Team of the Year: 2023–24
- Gerd Müller Trophy: 2024 (shared), 2026

Orders

- Member of the Order of the British Empire: 2019
- Freedom of the City of London: 2023

== See also ==
- List of top international men's football goalscorers by country
- List of men's footballers with 100 or more international caps
- List of men's footballers with 50 or more international goals
- List of footballers with 100 or more Premier League goals
- List of footballers with 500 or more goals
- List of FIFA World Cup top goalscorers
