= Statue of Harry Kane =

Statue in Walthamstow, London

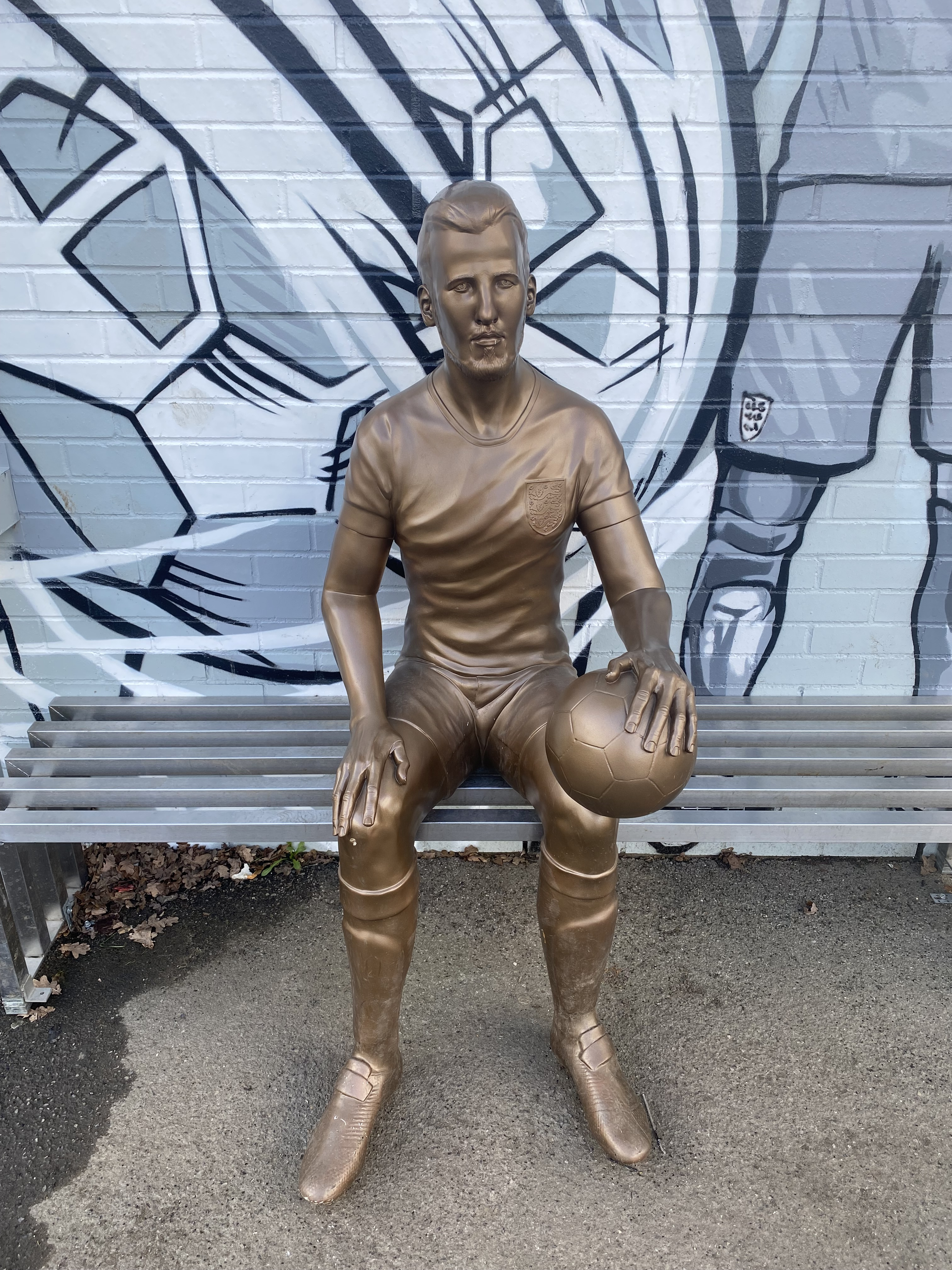
- Location: Peter May Sports Centre, Walthamstow, London
- Designer: Sculpture Machine
- Type: Statue
- Beginning date: 2019
- Completion date: 2020

A statue of the footballer Harry Kane, completed in 2020, was unveiled in Walthamstow, London, in November 2024.

== Statue ==
The statue was commissioned when Kane was a player with the north London team Tottenham Hotspur. It shows him seated on a bench with a football on his knee.

The work was funded by Waltham Forest Council at a cost of £7,200 in 2019 and 2020. Several locations were explored for the statue and it remained in storage while a location could be agreed upon. It was originally to be sited at Chingford railway station, but this was rejected following a risk assessment by Transport for London. A plan to place it in Ridgeway Park was also rejected.

The first pictures of the statue were obtained by the street newspaper Big Issue in 2024. The images were met with some criticism with some questioning whether a footballer should be sitting on a bench in the way portrayed, while others made fun of its brown, chocolate-like appearance.

The statue, along with a mural, were finally unveiled at the Peter May Sports Centre in Walthamstow on 18 November 2024. Kane began playing here as a five-year-old for Ridgeway Rovers.
